= 2005 Italian GT Championship =

Italian Motorsports Championship

The 2005 Italian GT Championship was the 14th season of the Italian GT Championship, the grand tourer-style sports car racing founded by the Italian Automobile Club (Automobile Club d'Italia). The season began on 2 April at Imola and finished at Vallelunga on 16 October.

Matteo Malucelli and Miguel Ramos won the GT1 championship in the BMS Scuderia Italia Ferrari. The GT2 title went the way of Playteam Sara Free Ferrari duo, Alessandro Pier Guidi and Toni Vilander. Andrea Palma and Danilo Zampaloni claimed the GT3 championship despite only winning one race the entire season.

== Calendar ==
Round	Circuit	Date
1	Autodromo Internazionale Enzo e Dino Ferrari, Imola, Emilia-Romagna	2–3 April
2	Misano World Circuit Marco Simoncelli, Misano Adriatico, Emilia-Romagna	30 April – 1 May
3	ACI Vallelunga Circuit, Campagnano di Roma, Rome	28–29 May
4	Autodromo Nazionale Monza, Monza, Lombardy	11–12 June
5	Hungaroring, Mogyoród, Hungary	8–10 July
6	Autodromo dell'Umbria, Magione, Umbria	22–24 July
7	Autodromo Internazionale del Mugello, Mugello, Tuscany	16–18 September
8	ACI Vallelunga Circuit, Campagnano di Roma, Rome	14–16 October

== Entry List ==
=== GT1 ===
Team	Car	Engine	No.	Drivers	Rounds
(Switzerland) Kessel Racing	Ferrari 575 GTC Evo	Ferrari F133 GT 6.0 L V12	03	(Switzerland) Andrea Chiesa	All
(Switzerland) Kessel Racing	Ferrari 575 GTC Evo	Ferrari F133 GT 6.0 L V12	03	(Switzerland) Loris Kessel	All
(Italy) Megadrive Srl	Maserati MC12 GT1	Maserati M144B/2 6.0 L V12	1	(Italy) Gabriele Matteuzzi	All
(Italy) Megadrive Srl	Maserati MC12 GT1	Maserati M144B/2 6.0 L V12	1	(Italy) Piergiuseppe Perazzini	All
(Italy) Megadrive Srl	Chrysler Viper GTS-R	Chrysler EWB 8.0 L V10	7	(Italy) Daniele Massaro	4
(Italy) Megadrive Srl	Chrysler Viper GTS-R	Chrysler EWB 8.0 L V10	7	(Italy) Arturo Merzario	4
(Italy) Megadrive Srl	Chrysler Viper GTS-R	Chrysler EWB 8.0 L V10	7	(Italy) Alberto Cerrai	8
(Italy) Megadrive Srl	Chrysler Viper GTS-R	Chrysler EWB 8.0 L V10	7	(Italy) Roberto Del Castello	8
(United Kingdom) Lister GB	Lister Storm GTM	Jaguar 7.0 L V12	2	(Italy) Andrea Belicchi	All
(United Kingdom) Lister GB	Lister Storm GTM	Jaguar 7.0 L V12	2	(Italy) Stefano Zonca	All
(Monaco) JMB Racing	Ferrari 575 GTC	Ferrari F133 GT 6.0 L V12	4	(Italy) Lorenzo Casè	1–6
(Monaco) JMB Racing	Ferrari 575 GTC	Ferrari F133 GT 6.0 L V12	4	(Italy) Marcello Zani	1–6
(Monaco) JMB Racing	Ferrari 575 GTC	Ferrari F133 GT 6.0 L V12	4	(Germany) Peter Kutermann	8
(Monaco) JMB Racing	Ferrari 575 GTC	Ferrari F133 GT 6.0 L V12	4	(Russia) Sergey Zlobin	8
(Italy) Ettore Bonaldi	Saleen S7-R	Ford Windsor 7.0 L V8	5	(Italy) Ettore Bonaldi	1–6, 8
(Italy) Ettore Bonaldi	Saleen S7-R	Ford Windsor 7.0 L V8	5	(Italy) Davide Mastracci	1–6
(Italy) Ettore Bonaldi	Saleen S7-R	Ford Windsor 7.0 L V8	5	(Italy) Gianni Morbidelli	8
(Italy) Gabriele Sabatini	Chrysler Viper GTS-R	Chrysler EWB 8.0 L V10	6	(Italy) Giorgio Pandini	All
(Italy) Gabriele Sabatini	Chrysler Viper GTS-R	Chrysler EWB 8.0 L V10	6	(Italy) Gabriele Sabatini	All
(Germany) Reiter Engineering	Lamborghini Murciélago R-GT	Lamborghini L535 6.0 L V12	8	(Italy) Stefano Gabellini	4
(Germany) Reiter Engineering	Lamborghini Murciélago R-GT	Lamborghini L535 6.0 L V12	8	(Italy) Gianni Morbidelli	4
(Italy) Maurizio Strada	Chrysler Viper GTS-R	Chrysler EWB 8.0 L V10	9	(Italy) Maurizio Strada	1–5, 7
(Italy) Maurizio Strada	Chrysler Viper GTS-R	Chrysler EWB 8.0 L V10	9	(Italy) Davide Stancheris	3–5, 7
(Italy) Maurizio Strada	Chrysler Viper GTS-R	Chrysler EWB 8.0 L V10	9	(Italy) "Base Up"	1–2
(Italy) GPC Sport	Ferrari 575 GTC Evo	Ferrari F133 GT 6.0 L V12	11	(Italy) Stefano Livio	All
(Italy) GPC Sport	Ferrari 575 GTC Evo	Ferrari F133 GT 6.0 L V12	11	(Italy) Fabio Santaniello	All
(Czech Republic) Antonín Herbeck	Ferrari 575 GTC	Ferrari F133 GT 6.0 L V12	12	(Czech Republic) Antonín Herbeck	1–7
(Czech Republic) Antonín Herbeck	Ferrari 575 GTC	Ferrari F133 GT 6.0 L V12	12	(Italy) Andrea Montermini	1–7
(Italy) BMS Scuderia Italia	Ferrari 550-GTS Maranello	Ferrari F133 A 6.0 L V12	22	(Italy) Luca Cappellari	All
(Italy) BMS Scuderia Italia	Ferrari 550-GTS Maranello	Ferrari F133 A 6.0 L V12	22	(Italy) Angelo Lancelotti	All
(Italy) BMS Scuderia Italia	Ferrari 550-GTS Maranello	Ferrari F133 A 6.0 L V12	23	(Italy) Matteo Malucelli	All
(Italy) BMS Scuderia Italia	Ferrari 550-GTS Maranello	Ferrari F133 A 6.0 L V12	23	(Portugal) Miguel Ramos	All

=== GT2 ===
Team	Car	Engine	No.	Drivers	Rounds
(Italy) Ebimotors Srl	Porsche 996 GT3-RSR	Porsche M96/79 3.6 L Flat-6	52	(Italy) Massimo Pigoli	All
(Italy) Ebimotors Srl	Porsche 996 GT3-RSR	Porsche M96/79 3.6 L Flat-6	52	(Italy) Luca Riccitelli	All
(Italy) Ebimotors Srl	Porsche 996 GT3-RSR	Porsche M96/79 3.6 L Flat-6	53	(Italy) "Linos"	1–6
(Italy) Ebimotors Srl	Porsche 996 GT3-RSR	Porsche M96/79 3.6 L Flat-6	53	(Italy) Emanuele Moncini	1–6
(Italy) Ebimotors Srl	Porsche 996 GT3-RSR	Porsche M96/79 3.6 L Flat-6	53	(Italy) Stefano Comandini	8
(Italy) Ebimotors Srl	Porsche 996 GT3-RSR	Porsche M96/79 3.6 L Flat-6	53	(Italy) Andrea Sonvico	8
(Italy) BMS Scuderia Italia	Ferrari 360 Modena GTC	Ferrari F131 3.6 L V8	54	(Italy) Michele Bartyan	1–4, 6–8
(Italy) BMS Scuderia Italia	Ferrari 360 Modena GTC	Ferrari F131 3.6 L V8	54	(Italy) Christian Pescatori	1–4, 6–8
(Italy) BMS Scuderia Italia	Ferrari 360 Modena GTC	Ferrari F131 3.6 L V8	54	(Italy) Arturo Merzario	5
(Italy) BMS Scuderia Italia	Ferrari 360 Modena GTC	Ferrari F131 3.6 L V8	54	(Italy) Paolo Ruberti	5
(Italy) Autorlando Sport Srl	Porsche 996 GT3-RSR	Porsche M96/79 3.6 L Flat-6	55	(Italy) Gianluca Roda	1–6, 8
(Italy) Autorlando Sport Srl	Porsche 996 GT3-RSR	Porsche M96/79 3.6 L Flat-6	55	(Italy) Alex Caffi	1–4, 6, 8
(Italy) Autorlando Sport Srl	Porsche 996 GT3-RSR	Porsche M96/79 3.6 L Flat-6	55	(United Kingdom) Johnny Mowlem	5
(Italy) Autorlando Sport Srl	Porsche 996 GT3 Cup	Porsche M96/77 3.6 L Flat-6	79	(Italy) Tiziano Cappelletti	2
(Italy) Autorlando Sport Srl	Porsche 996 GT3 Cup	Porsche M96/77 3.6 L Flat-6	79	(Italy) Marco Cefis	2
(Monaco) JMB Racing	Ferrari 360 Modena GTC	Ferrari F131 3.6 L V8	56	(Italy) Dino D'Ambrosio	All
(Monaco) JMB Racing	Ferrari 360 Modena GTC	Ferrari F131 3.6 L V8	56	(Italy) Maurizio Mediani	All
(Monaco) JMB Racing	Ferrari 360 Modena GTC	Ferrari F131 3.6 L V8	57	(Germany) Albert von Thurn und Taxis	1–6
(Monaco) JMB Racing	Ferrari 360 Modena GTC	Ferrari F131 3.6 L V8	57	(United States) Stephen Earle	1–2, 4–7
(Monaco) JMB Racing	Ferrari 360 Modena GTC	Ferrari F131 3.6 L V8	57	(Italy) Francesco La Mazza	7–8
(Monaco) JMB Racing	Ferrari 360 Modena GTC	Ferrari F131 3.6 L V8	57	(Switzerland) Steve Zacchia	3
(Monaco) JMB Racing	Ferrari 360 Modena GTC	Ferrari F131 3.6 L V8	57	(Italy) Lorenzo Casè	8
(Italy) GPC Sport	Ferrari 360 Modena GTC	Ferrari F131 3.6 L V8	58	(Italy) Gabriele Lancieri	1–7
(Italy) GPC Sport	Ferrari 360 Modena GTC	Ferrari F131 3.6 L V8	58	(Italy) Massimiliano Mugelli	1–7
(Italy) GPC Sport	Ferrari 360 Modena GTC	Ferrari F131 3.6 L V8	58	(Italy) Lorenzo Bontempelli	8
(Italy) GPC Sport	Ferrari 360 Modena GTC	Ferrari F131 3.6 L V8	58	(Italy) Luciano Linossi	8
(Italy) Mastercar	Ferrari 360 Modena GTC	Ferrari F131 3.6 L V8	71	(Italy) Mauro Bortignon	3
(Italy) Mastercar	Ferrari 360 Modena GTC	Ferrari F131 3.6 L V8	71	(Italy) Fabian Peroni	3
(Italy) Mastercar	Ferrari 360 Modena GTC	Ferrari F131 3.6 L V8	72	(Italy) Francesco La Mazza	3–4
(Italy) Mastercar	Ferrari 360 Modena GTC	Ferrari F131 3.6 L V8	72	(Italy) Arturo Merzario	3–4
(Italy) "Linos"	Ferrari 360 Modena GTC	Ferrari F131 3.6 L V8	73	(Italy) "Linos"	7–8
(Italy) "Linos"	Ferrari 360 Modena GTC	Ferrari F131 3.6 L V8	73	(Italy) Emanuele Moncini	7–8
(Italy) Playteam Sara Free	Ferrari 360 Modena GTC	Ferrari F131 3.6 L V8	77	(Italy) Giambattista Giannoccaro	1–6
(Italy) Playteam Sara Free	Ferrari 360 Modena GTC	Ferrari F131 3.6 L V8	77	(Italy) Gianluca Tedoldi	1–6
(Italy) Playteam Sara Free	Ferrari 360 Modena GTC	Ferrari F131 3.6 L V8	78	(Italy) Alessandro Pier Guidi	All
(Italy) Playteam Sara Free	Ferrari 360 Modena GTC	Ferrari F131 3.6 L V8	78	(Finland) Toni Vilander	All

=== GT3 ===
Team	Car	Engine	No.	Drivers	Rounds
(Italy) Autorlando Sport Srl	Porsche 996 GT3-R	Porsche M96/77 3.6 L Flat-6	201	(Italy) Giovanni Sada	1–2, 4–8
(Italy) Autorlando Sport Srl	Porsche 996 GT3-R	Porsche M96/77 3.6 L Flat-6	201	(Italy) Giovanni Caligaris	1–5, 7–8
(Italy) Autorlando Sport Srl	Porsche 996 GT3-R	Porsche M96/77 3.6 L Flat-6	201	(Switzerland) Riccardo Schmid	3
(Italy) Autorlando Sport Srl	Porsche 996 GT3-R	Porsche M96/77 3.6 L Flat-6	201	(Italy) Dario Cerati	6
(Italy) Autorlando Sport Srl	Porsche 996 GT3 Cup	Porsche M96/77 3.6 L Flat-6	207	(Italy) Simone D'Auria	2
(Italy) Autorlando Sport Srl	Porsche 996 GT3 Cup	Porsche M96/77 3.6 L Flat-6	207	(Italy) Davide Stancheris	2
(Italy) Gianni Giudici	Maserati Trofeo Light	Ferrari F136 4.2 L V8	202	(Italy) Gianni Giudici	1–4
(Italy) Gianni Giudici	Maserati Trofeo Light	Ferrari F136 4.2 L V8	202	(Italy) Diego Romanini	1–4
(Italy) Giorgio Cipolli	Maserati Trofeo Light	Ferrari F136 4.2 L V8	203	(Italy) Giorgio Cipolli	1–2
(Italy) Giorgio Cipolli	Maserati Trofeo Light	Ferrari F136 4.2 L V8	203	(Italy) Bruno Corradi	1–2
(Italy) Megadrive Srl	Maserati Trofeo Light	Ferrari F136 4.2 L V8	204	(Italy) Andrea Ceccato	All
(Italy) Megadrive Srl	Maserati Trofeo Light	Ferrari F136 4.2 L V8	204	(Italy) Adriano Baso	1–2, 4
(Italy) Megadrive Srl	Maserati Trofeo Light	Ferrari F136 4.2 L V8	204	(Italy) Arturo Merzario	6–8
(Italy) Megadrive Srl	Maserati Trofeo Light	Ferrari F136 4.2 L V8	204	(Italy) Michele Rugolo	3
(Italy) Megadrive Srl	Maserati Trofeo Light	Ferrari F136 4.2 L V8	204	(Italy) Francesco La Mazza	5
(Italy) AF Corse	Maserati Trofeo Light	Ferrari F136 4.2 L V8	205	(Portugal) Rui Águas	All
(Italy) AF Corse	Maserati Trofeo Light	Ferrari F136 4.2 L V8	205	(Italy) Alessandro Frigerio	4, 6–8
(Italy) AF Corse	Maserati Trofeo Light	Ferrari F136 4.2 L V8	205	(Italy) Luca Frigerio	1–3
(Italy) AF Corse	Maserati Trofeo Light	Ferrari F136 4.2 L V8	205	(Monaco) Gianluca De Lorenzi	5
(Italy) AF Corse	Maserati Trofeo Light	Ferrari F136 4.2 L V8	206	(Italy) Andrea Palma	All
(Italy) AF Corse	Maserati Trofeo Light	Ferrari F136 4.2 L V8	206	(Italy) Danilo Zampaloni	All

== Race Results ==
Round		Circuit	GT1 Winners	GT2 Winners	GT3 Winners
1	R1	(Emilia-Romagna) Imola	Race was cancelled due to the death of the Pope.		
1	R2	(Emilia-Romagna) Imola	Race was cancelled due to the death of the Pope.		
2	R1	(Emilia-Romagna) Misano	(Italy) No. 23 BMS Scuderia Italia	(Italy) No. 78 Playteam Sara Free	(Italy) No. 206 AF Corse
2	R1	(Emilia-Romagna) Misano	(Italy) Matteo Malucelli (Portugal) Miguel Ramos	(Italy) Alessandro Pier Guidi (Finland) Toni Vilander	(Italy) Andrea Palma (Italy) Danilo Zampaloni
2	R2	(Emilia-Romagna) Misano	(Italy) No. 1 Megadrive Srl	(Italy) No. 78 Playteam Sara Free	(Italy) No. 205 AF Corse
2	R2	(Emilia-Romagna) Misano	(Italy) Gabriele Matteuzzi (Italy) Piergiuseppe Perazzini	(Italy) Alessandro Pier Guidi (Finland) Toni Vilander	(Portugal) Rui Águas (Italy) Luca Frigerio
3	R1	(Rome) Vallelunga	(Italy) No. 23 BMS Scuderia Italia	(Italy) No. 54 BMS Scuderia Italia	(Italy) No. 204 Megadrive Srl
3	R1	(Rome) Vallelunga	(Italy) Matteo Malucelli (Portugal) Miguel Ramos	(Italy) Michele Bartyan (Italy) Christian Pescatori	(Italy) Andrea Ceccato (Italy) Michele Rugolo
3	R2	(Rome) Vallelunga	(Italy) No. 1 Megadrive Srl	(Italy) No. 78 Playteam Sara Free	(Italy) No. 204 Megadrive Srl
3	R2	(Rome) Vallelunga	(Italy) Gabriele Matteuzzi (Italy) Piergiuseppe Perazzini	(Italy) Alessandro Pier Guidi (Finland) Toni Vilander	(Italy) Andrea Ceccato (Italy) Michele Rugolo
4	R1	(Lombardy) Monza	(Italy) No. 1 Megadrive Srl	(Italy) No. 52 Ebimotors Srl	(Italy) No. 205 AF Corse
4	R1	(Lombardy) Monza	(Italy) Gabriele Matteuzzi (Italy) Piergiuseppe Perazzini	(Italy) Massimo Pigoli (Italy) Luca Riccitelli	(Portugal) Rui Águas (Italy) Luca Frigerio
4	R2	(Lombardy) Monza	(Italy) No. 22 BMS Scuderia Italia	(Italy) No. 52 Ebimotors Srl	(Italy) No. 202 Gianni Giudici
4	R2	(Lombardy) Monza	(Italy) Luca Cappellari (Italy) Angelo Lancelotti	(Italy) Massimo Pigoli (Italy) Luca Riccitelli	(Italy) Gianni Giudici (Italy) Diego Romanini
5	R1	(Hungary) Hungaroring	(Monaco) No. 4 JMB Racing	(Italy) No. 52 Ebimotors Srl	(Italy) No. 205 AF Corse
5	R1	(Hungary) Hungaroring	(Italy) Lorenzo Casè (Italy) Marcello Zani	(Italy) Massimo Pigoli (Italy) Luca Riccitelli	(Portugal) Rui Águas (Italy) Gianluca de Lorenzi
5	R2	(Hungary) Hungaroring	(Italy) No. 1 Megadrive Srl	(Italy) No. 52 Ebimotors Srl	(Italy) No. 205 AF Corse
5	R2	(Hungary) Hungaroring	(Italy) Gabriele Matteuzzi (Italy) Piergiuseppe Perazzini	(Italy) Massimo Pigoli (Italy) Luca Riccitelli	(Portugal) Rui Águas (Italy) Gianluca de Lorenzi
6	R1	dell'Umbria	(Italy) No. 22 BMS Scuderia Italia	(Italy) No. 78 Playteam Sara Free	(Italy) No. 204 Megadrive Srl
6	R1	dell'Umbria	(Italy) Luca Cappellari (Italy) Angelo Lancelotti	(Italy) Alessandro Pier Guidi (Finland) Toni Vilander	(Italy) Andrea Ceccato (Italy) Arturo Merzario
6	R2	dell'Umbria	(Italy) No. 23 BMS Scuderia Italia	(Italy) No. 78 Playteam Sara Free	(Italy) No. 204 Megadrive Srl
6	R2	dell'Umbria	(Italy) Matteo Malucelli (Portugal) Miguel Ramos	(Italy) Alessandro Pier Guidi (Finland) Toni Vilander	(Italy) Andrea Ceccato (Italy) Arturo Merzario
7	R1	(Tuscany) Mugello	(Italy) No. 1 Megadrive Srl	(Italy) No. 78 Playteam Sara Free	(Italy) No. 205 AF Corse
7	R1	(Tuscany) Mugello	(Italy) Gabriele Matteuzzi (Italy) Piergiuseppe Perazzini	(Italy) Alessandro Pier Guidi (Finland) Toni Vilander	(Portugal) Rui Águas (Italy) Luca Frigerio
7	R2	(Tuscany) Mugello	(Italy) No. 23 BMS Scuderia Italia	(Italy) No. 78 Playteam Sara Free	(Italy) No. 201 Autorlando Sport Srl
7	R2	(Tuscany) Mugello	(Italy) Matteo Malucelli (Portugal) Miguel Ramos	(Italy) Alessandro Pier Guidi (Finland) Toni Vilander	(Italy) Giovanni Caligaris (Italy) Giovanni Sada
8	R1	(Rome) Vallelunga	(Italy) No. 23 BMS Scuderia Italia	(Italy) No. 54 BMS Scuderia Italia	(Italy) No. 205 AF Corse
8	R1	(Rome) Vallelunga	(Italy) Matteo Malucelli (Portugal) Miguel Ramos	(Italy) Michele Bartyan (Italy) Christian Pescatori	(Portugal) Rui Águas (Italy) Luca Frigerio
8	R2	(Rome) Vallelunga	(Italy) No. 22 BMS Scuderia Italia	(Italy) No. 78 Playteam Sara Free	(Italy) No. 205 AF Corse
8	R2	(Rome) Vallelunga	(Italy) Luca Cappellari (Italy) Angelo Lancelotti	(Italy) Alessandro Pier Guidi (Finland) Toni Vilander	(Portugal) Rui Águas (Italy) Luca Frigerio

== Championship standings ==
=== Drivers' championship ===
==== Scoring system ====
Position	**1st**	**2nd**	**3rd**	**4th**	**5th**	**6th**	**7th**	**8th**
Points	20	15	12	10	8	6	4	3

==== GT1 ====
Pos.	Driver	Team	IMO		MIS		VAL1		MNZ		HUN		MAG		MUG		VAL2		Points
Pos.	Driver	Team	R1	R2	R1	R2	R1	R2	R1	R2	R1	R2	R1	R2	R1	R2	R1	R2	Points
1	(Italy) Matteo Malucelli (Portugal) Miguel Ramos	(Italy) BMS Scuderia Italia	C	**C**	**1**	3	1	**2**	**2**	2	6	2	**2**	1	2	1	**1**	2	223
2	(Italy) Gabriele Matteuzzi (Italy) Piergiuseppe Perazzini	(Italy) Megadrive Srl	C	C	2	1	4	1	1	8	4	**1**	3	4	1	**3**	Ret	3	181
3	(Italy) Luca Cappellari (Italy) Angelo Lancelotti	(Italy) BMS Scuderia Italia	**C**	C	3	**2**	**2**	3	3	**1**	**DSQ**	Ret	1	5	**4**	2	2	**1**	174
4	(Switzerland) Andrea Chiesa (Switzerland) Loris Kessel	(Switzerland) Kessel Racing	C	C	5	Ret	DNS	DNS	7	4	3	Ret	6	6	3	7	4	4	82
5	(Italy) Lorenzo Casè (Italy) Marcello Zani	(Monaco) JMB Racing	C	C	Ret	5	6	4	4	6	1	5	5	7					80
6	(Italy) Stefano Livio (Italy) Fabio Santaniello	(Italy) GPC Sport	C	C	4	6	Ret	DNS	11	Ret	5	3	4	Ret	Ret	4	3	7	72
7	(Italy) Andrea Belicchi (Italy) Stefano Zonca	(United Kingdom) Lister GB	C	C	Ret	DNS	3	5	DNS	DNS	2	4	8	2	5	Ret	Ret	DNS	68
8	(Italy) Ettore Bonaldi	(Italy) Ettore Bonaldi	C	C	Ret	4	5	6	9	7	7	6	Ret	3	6	Ret	Ret	Ret	58
8	(Italy) Davide Mastracci	(Italy) Ettore Bonaldi	C	C	Ret	4	5	6	9	7	7	6	Ret	3	6	Ret			58
9	(Italy) Giorgio Pandini (Italy) Gabriele Sabatini	(Italy) Gabriele Sabatini	C	C	7	8	Ret	7	Ret	3	9	Ret	7	9	7	6	6	8	47
10	(Czech Republic) Antonín Herbeck (Italy) Andrea Montermini	(Czech Republic) Antonín Herbeck	C	C	6	Ret	Ret	DNS	6	5	8	7	Ret	**8**	Ret	Ret			30
11	(Italy) Maurizio Strada	(Italy) Maurizio Strada	C	C	8	7	7	Ret	10	Ret	10	8			Ret	5			24
12	(Italy) Roberto del Castello (Italy) Alberto Cerrai	(Italy) Megadrive Srl															5	5	16
13	(Italy) Davide Stancheris	(Italy) Maurizio Strada					7	Ret	10	Ret	10	8			Ret	5			13
14	(Italy) Gianni Morbidelli	(Germany) Reiter Engineering							5	10									8
14	(Italy) Gianni Morbidelli	(Italy) Ettore Bonaldi															Ret	Ret	8
14	(Italy) Stefano Gabellini	(Germany) Reiter Engineering							5	10									8
15	(Italy) "Base Up"	(Italy) Maurizio Strada	C	C	8	7													7
16	(Germany) Peter Kutermann (Russia) Sergey Zlobin	(Monaco) JMB Racing															DNS	6	6
17	(Italy) Daniele Massaro (Italy) Arturo Merzario	(Italy) Megadrive Srl							8	9									3

Key
Colour	Result
Gold	Race winner
Silver	2nd place
Bronze	3rd place
Green	Points finish
Blue	Non-points finish
Blue	Non-classified finish (NC)
Purple	Did not finish (Ret)
Black	Disqualified (DSQ)
Black	Excluded (EX)
White	Did not start (DNS)
White	Race cancelled (C)
White	Withdrew (WD)
Blank	Did not participate

**Bold** – Pole
Italics – Fastest Lap

==== GT2 ====
Pos.	Driver	Team	IMO		MIS		VAL1		MNZ		HUN		MAG		MUG		VAL2		Points
Pos.	Driver	Team	R1	R2	R1	R2	R1	R2	R1	R2	R1	R2	R1	R2	R1	R2	R1	R2	Points
1	(Italy) Alessandro Pier Guidi (Finland) Toni Vilander	(Italy) Playteam Sara Free	C	C	**1**	**1**	6	1	2	2	**6**	**Ret**	**1**	**1**	**1**	**1**	5	1	210
2	(Italy) Massimo Pigoli (Italy) Luca Riccitelli	(Italy) Ebimotors Srl	C	**C**	5	4	3	Ret	**1**	**1**	1	1	3	3	2	5	Ret	DNS	157
3	(Italy) Michele Bartyan (Italy) Christian Pescatori	(Italy) BMS Scuderia Italia	**C**	C	2	Ret	1	2	6	4			2	2	5	3	**1**	2	151
4	(Italy) Gianluca Roda	(Italy) Autorlando Sport Srl	C	C	3	Ret	4	4	Ret	8	5	3	6	5	3	4	2	3	118
5	(Italy) "Linos" (Italy) Emanuele Moncini	(Italy) Ebimotors Srl (Italy) "Linos"	C	C	6	3	8	3	3	Ret	3	4	4	4	DNS	DNS	DNS	DNS	99
6	(Italy) Alex Caffi	(Italy) Autorlando Sport Srl	C	C	3	Ret	4	4	Ret	8			6	5	3	4	2	3	98
7	(Italy) Gabriele Lancieri (Italy) Massimiliano Mugelli	(Italy) GPC Sport	C	C	4	2	2	**Ret**	5	3	4	Ret	Ret	Ret	4	2			95
8	(Italy) Dino D'Ambrosio (Italy) Maurizio Mediani	(Monaco) JMB Racing	C	C	7	5	**5**	8	4	5	7	5	Ret	6	6	6	4	**4**	91
9	(Italy) Arturo Merzario	(Italy) BMS Scuderia Italia					9	7			2	2							36
10	(Germany) Albert von Thurn und Taxis	(Monaco) JMB Racing	C	C	Ret	6	7	5	Ret	6	8	6	Ret	Ret					33
11	(Italy) Francesco La Mazza	(Italy) Mastercar					9	7	7	7					Ret	7	6	5	32
12	(Italy) Paolo Ruberti	(Italy) BMS Scuderia Italia									2	2							30
13	(United States) Stephen Earle	(Monaco) JMB Racing	C	C	Ret	6			Ret	6	8	6	Ret	Ret	Ret	7			25
14	(United Kingdom) Johnny Mowlem	(Italy) Autorlando Sport Srl									5	3							20
15	(Italy) Giambattista Giannoccaro (Italy) Gianluca Tedoldi	(Italy) Playteam Sara Free	C	C	9	7	10	9	8	DNS	9	Ret	5	7					19
16	(Italy) Mauro Bortignon	(Italy) Mastercar					12	6	7	7									14
16	(Italy) Lorenzo Casè	(Monaco) JMB Racing															6	5	14
17	(Italy) Lorenzo Bontempelli (Italy) Luciano Linossi	(Italy) GPC Sport															3	Ret	12
17	(Switzerland) Steve Zacchia	(Monaco) JMB Racing					7	5											12
18	(Italy) Fabian Peroni	(Italy) Mastercar					12	6											6
19	(Italy) Tiziano Cappelletti (Italy) Marco Cefis	(Italy) Autorlando Sport Srl			8	Ret	11	10											4

==== GT3 ====
Pos.	Driver	Team	IMO		MIS		VAL1		MNZ		HUN		MAG		MUG		VAL2		Points
Pos.	Driver	Team	R1	R2	R1	R2	R1	R2	R1	R2	R1	R2	R1	R2	R1	R2	R1	R2	Points
1	(Italy) Andrea Palma (Italy) Danilo Zampaloni	(Italy) AF Corse	C	C	1	**2**	2	2	2	2	**2**	2	3	3	3	2	3	2	203
2	(Portugal) Rui Águas	(Italy) AF Corse	**C**	**C**	**Ret**	1	**4**	4	1	Ret	1	**1**	**2**	2	1	**3**	**1**	1	192
3	(Italy) Andrea Ceccato	(Italy) Megadrive Srl	C	C	3	4	1	**1**	4	3	4	4	1	**1**	**2**	Ret	DSQ	4	159
4	(Italy) Giovanni Sada	(Italy) Autorlando Sport Srl	C	C	4	6			**3**	4	3	3	4	4	4	1	2	**3**	139
5	(Italy) Giovanni Caligaris	(Italy) Autorlando Sport Srl	C	C	4	6	3	Ret	**3**	4	3	3			4	1	2	**3**	131
6	(Italy) Alessandro Frigerio	(Italy) AF Corse							1	Ret			**2**	2	1	**3**	**1**	1	82
7	(Italy) Luca Frigerio	(Italy) AF Corse	**C**	**C**	**Ret**	1	**4**	4											70
8	(Italy) Arturo Merzario	(Italy) Megadrive Srl											1	**1**	**2**	Ret	DSQ	4	55
9	(Italy) Adriano Baso	(Italy) Megadrive Srl	C	C	3	4			4	3									44
10	(Monaco) Gianluca De Lorenzi	(Italy) AF Corse									1	**1**							40
10	(Italy) Michele Rugolo	(Italy) Megadrive Srl					1	**1**											40
11	(Italy) Gianni Giudici (Italy) Diego Romanini	(Italy) Giudici Corse	C	C	Ret	DNS	Ret	3	Ret	**1**	Ret								32
12	(Italy) Giorgio Cipolli (Italy) Bruno Corradi	(Italy) Giorgio Cipolli	C	C	2	3													27
13	(Italy) Dario Cerati	(Italy) Autorlando Sport Srl											4	4					20
13	(Italy) Francesco La Mazza	(Italy) Megadrive Srl									4	4							20
14	(Italy) Simone D'Auria (Italy) Davide Stancheris	(Italy) Autorlando Sport Srl			5	5													16
15	(Switzerland) Riccardo Schmid	(Italy) Autorlando Sport Srl					3	Ret											12
