= Italian GT Championship =

Italian sports car series

- Category: Sports cars
- Country: Italy
- Inaugural season: 1993
- Drivers: 15
- Constructors: (Italy) Ferrari (Germany) Porsche (Germany) Mercedes-AMG (Germany) BMW
- Drivers' champion: GT3: Vito Postiglione; Luigi Lucchini
- Teams' champion: GT3: Ebimotors
- Official website: www.acisportitalia.it/GT/

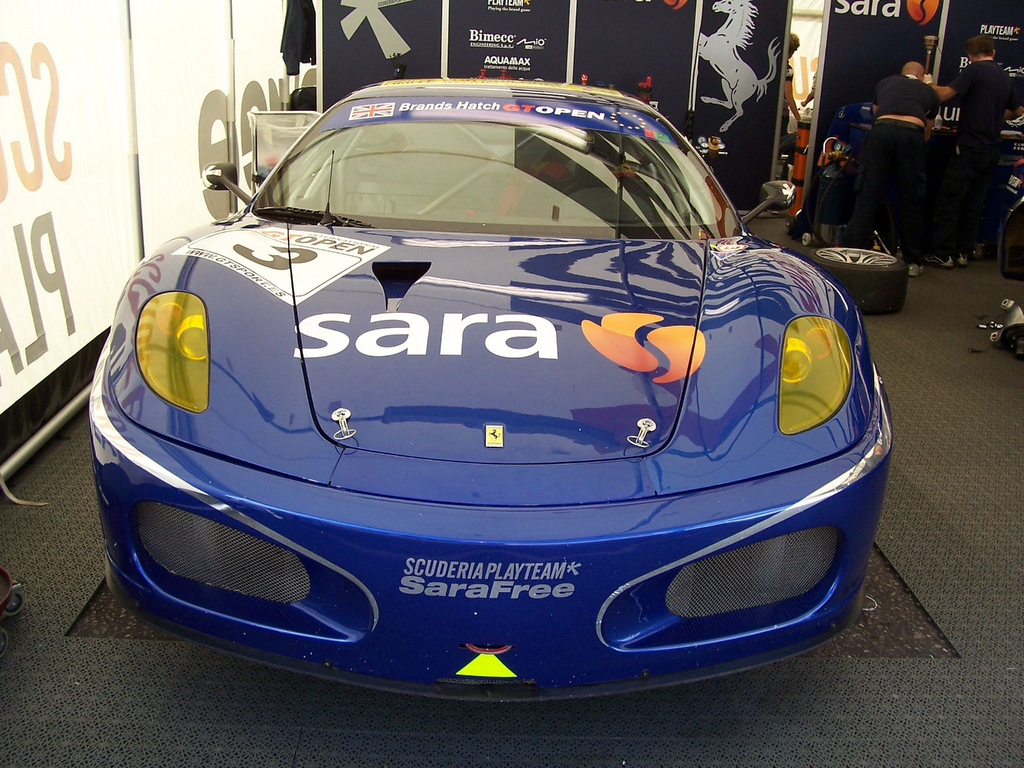
A Scuderia Playteam Ferrari F430, regular competitors in the Italian GT Championship.

The Italian GT Championship (Campionato Italiano Gran Turismo) is an Italian sports car series founded in 2003 and organized by the Automobile Club d'Italia (ACI) and the Commissione Sportiva Automobilistica Italiana (CSAI). It replaced a previous supercar-based championship which ran from 1992 until 2002 when it was folded due to a lack of entrants. The series borrowed heavily from the international FIA GT Championship in its first few seasons, although additional entries from Ferrari Challenge, Porsche Supercup, and Maserati Trofeo competitors were allowed.

Following the 2006 season, the top GT1 class was dropped from the championship, leaving competitors in the GT2, GT3, and GT Cup classes. GT2 competition is dominated by the Ferrari F430, with several Porsche 911 GT3s as well. The GT3 class features a variety of machines from the FIA GT3 European Championship, from Aston Martin, Chrysler and Lamborghini, while the GT Cup class is once again made up of Ferrari Challenge and Porsche Supercup cars.

== Circuits ==
- (Italy) Autodromo Nazionale Monza (1992–1994, 1996, 1998, 2000–2001, 2003–present)
- (Italy) Autodromo Vallelunga Piero Taruffi (1992–present)
- (Italy) Misano World Circuit Marco Simoncelli (1992–2018, 2020–present)
- (Italy) Autodromo Internazionale del Mugello (1992–1995, 2001, 2003–present)
- (Italy) Autodromo Internazionale Enzo e Dino Ferrari (1992–1993, 1995, 2001, 2003–2006, 2009–2019, 2021–present)
- (Italy) Autodromo dell'Umbria (1993–1997, 1999–2011)
- Circuit de Monaco (1993)
- (Italy) Autodromo di Pergusa (1993, 2003–2004, 2021–2023)
- (Italy) Autodromo del Levante (1993–1994)
- (Italy) Autodromo Riccardo Paletti (1993–1997, 1999–2001)
- (Croatia) Automotodrom Grobnik (1997, 2000)
- (France) Circuit Paul Ricard (1998, 2014, 2018)
- (Austria) Red Bull Ring (1998, 2002–2003, 2012–2013)
- (Italy) Adria International Raceway (2002, 2007)
- (France) Circuit de Lédenon (2002)
- (Hungary) Hungaroring (2005)
- (Spain) Circuit de la Comunitat Valenciana Ricardo Tormo (2008)

== Champions ==
Season	Overall			
1992	(Italy) Rory Parasitili			
1993	(Italy) Marco Brand			
1994	(Italy) Vittorio Colombo			
1995	(Italy) Renato Mastropietro			
1996	(Italy) Antonio de Castro			
Season	GT1	GT2	GT3	GT4
1997	(Italy) Gianni Giudici	(Italy) Alex Dazzan	(Italy) Antonio de Castro	(Italy) Nanni Corongi
1998	(Italy) Luca Cattaneo			
1999		(Italy) Massimo Pasini	(Italy) Mario Spagnoli	(Italy) Aspero Lapilli
2000	(Italy) Massimo Pasini	(Italy) Alex Dazzan	(Italy) "Romoletto"	(Italy) Sergio Bertoni
2001	(Italy) Massimo Pasini	(Italy) Mario Spagnoli	(Italy) "Romoletto"	(Italy) Saturno Bandiera
2002	(Italy) Denny Zardo	(Italy) Antonio de Castro	(Italy) Roberto Ragazzi	(Italy) Roberto Farnetti
Season	GT	N-GT	GT 2	
2003	(Italy) Piergiuseppe Perazzini	(Switzerland) Andrea Chiesa	(Italy) Massimo Piacentini (Italy) Roberto Sperati	
2004	(Italy) Piergiuseppe Perazzini (Italy) Gabriele Matteuzzi	(Switzerland) Andrea Chiesa (Switzerland) Loris Kessel	(Italy) Mario Sala (Italy) Giovanni Sada	
Season	GT1	GT2	GT3	
2005	(Italy) Matteo Malucelli (Portugal) Miguel Ramos	(Finland) Toni Vilander (Italy) Alessandro Pier Guidi	(Italy) Andrea Palma (Italy) Danilo Zampaloni	
2006	(Finland) Toni Vilander (Italy) Giambattista Giannoccaro	(Italy) Alex Caffi (Italy) Denny Zardo		
Season	GT2	GT3	GT Cup	GT4
2007	(Italy) Stefano Livio (Italy) Lorenzo Casè	(Italy) Giacomo Piccini (Italy) Giovanni Berton (Italy) Marco Coldani (GT3B)	(Italy) Angelo Proietti	
2008	(Italy) Max Busnelli (Italy) Gabriele Lancieri	(Italy) Giacomo Piccini (Italy) Matteo Grassotto	(Italy) Mario Sala (Italy) Giovanni Sada	(Italy) "Yah Man"
2009	(Portugal) Francisco Cruz Martins	(Italy) Stefano Livio (Italy) Lorenzo Bontempelli	(Italy) Aldo Cerruti (Italy) Mario Ferraris	
2010	(Italy) Andrea Montermini (Italy) Emanuele Moncini	(Italy) Gianluca Roda	(Italy) Marco Mapelli (Italy) Fabio Mancini	(Italy) Agostino Alberghino (Italy) Sergio Orsero
2011	(Italy) Victor Coggiola (Italy) Giovanni Coggiola	(Italy) Marco Bonanomi	(Italy) Giorgio Sanna (Italy) Davide Stancheris	(Italy) Tiziano Cappelletti
Season	GT2	GT3	GT Cup (1st Division)	GT Cup (2nd Division)
2012	(Italy) Victor Coggiola (Italy) Giovanni Coggiola	(Italy) Thomas Biagi (Italy) Stefano Colombo	(Italy) Niccolò Granzotto (Italy) Alessandro Cicognani	(Italy) Vincenzo Donativi
Season	GT3	GT Cup (1st Division)	GT Cup (2nd Division)	
2013	(Italy) Vito Postiglione (Italy) Luigi Lucchini	(Italy) Fabio Babini (Italy) Riccardo Bianco		
2014	(Italy) Raffaele Giammaria (Italy) Lorenzo Casè	(Italy) Omar Galbiati	(Italy) Gianni Giudici	
2015	(Italy) Stefano Gattuso	(Italy) Luca Pastorelli (Italy) Nicola Pastorelli		
2016	(Italy) Federico Leo (Italy) Eddie Cheever III			
2017	(Italy) Simone Niboli			
2018	(Italy) Daniel Zampieri (Italy) Giacomo Altoè			
2019	(Italy) Alessio Rovera (Italy) Riccardo Agostini			
2020	(Italy) Riccardo Agostini			
2021	(Italy) Riccardo Agostini (Italy) Lorenzo Ferrari			
2022	(Italy) Jacopo Guidetti (Italy) Leonardo Moncini			
2023	(Germany) Jens Klingmann (Canada) Bruno Spengler			
Season	GT3 Sprint	GT3 Endurance	GT Cup (1st Division)	GT Cup (2nd Division)
2024	(Germany) Jens Klingmann	(Italy) Giancarlo Fisichella (Monaco) Arthur Leclerc (Italy) Tommaso Mosca		
2025	(Italy) Andrea Frassineti	(Italy) Riccardo Cazzaniga (Italy) Rocco Mazzola (Germany) Fabio Rauer		
2026	(Germany) Jens Klingmann			
