= Lorenzo Bontempelli =

Italian racing driver (born 1965)

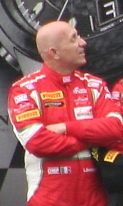
- Bontempelli in 2016
- Nationality: (Italy) Italian
- Born: 31 October 1965 (age 61) Sesto San Giovanni, Italy
- Categorisation: FIA Silver (until 2015); FIA Bronze (2016–)

Championship titles
- 2011 2011 2009 2006 2006: Ferrari Challenge World Finals – Trofeo Pirelli; International GT Open – GTS; Italian GT Championship – GT3; Ferrari Challenge World Finals – 360 Challenge; Ferrari Challenge Italy – 360 Challenge

Lorenzo Bontempelli (born 31 October 1965) is an Italian dentist and racing driver who last competed in the Italian GT Championship for Easy Race. A long-term Ferrari gentleman driver, he won International GT Open in 2011 and was a race winner in FIA GT3 for Kessel Racing.

== Personal life ==
Alongside his racing career, Bontempelli works as a dentist at Naturlife Dental Mendrisio and the Studio Dentistico Dr. Bontempelli in Correzzana.

== Career ==
Bontempelli began his racing career in 1993 in the Formula Junior Monza series, and primarily dabbled between entry-level junior formulae and one-make Renault championships until 2002. During 2002, Bontempelli made his sportscar debut in Ferrari Challenge Italy, a series in which he raced in for the next five seasons, winning the 360 Challenge in 2006 in both the Italian series and the World Finals.

After finishing third in the Trofeo Pirelli standings in 2007, Bontempelli switched to Racing Team Edil Cris and International GT Open for 2008, taking three GTA podiums and 12th in points. In 2009, Bontempelli joined Kessel Racing for a varied programme with the Ferrari 430 Scuderia in Europe, in which he secured the GT3 title in the Italian GT Championship with Stefano Livio, as well as a win at Zolder in the FIA GT3 European Championship with Stefano Gattuso. Remaining with the Swiss team for 2010, Bontempelli most notably finished third in International GT Open's GTS standings alongside Livio, with three wins and five other podiums to their name.

The following year, Bontempelli clinched International GT Open's GTS title with Gattuso and the team, as well as the Ferrari Challenge World Finals in Trofeo Pirelli and runner-up honours in the Italian series. After finishing eighth in the GTS standings for Ombra Racing in 2012, Bontempelli returned to Kessel for 2013, taking an outright win at Spa and five other podiums to finish runner-up in GTS. Following a part-time campaign in GT Open split between three teams in 2014, which included a GTS win at Jerez for Nissan-affiliated Nova Race, Bontempelli had a varied 2015 campaign, which was headlined by finishing fourth overall at the 6 Hours of Vallelunga for Oregon Team.

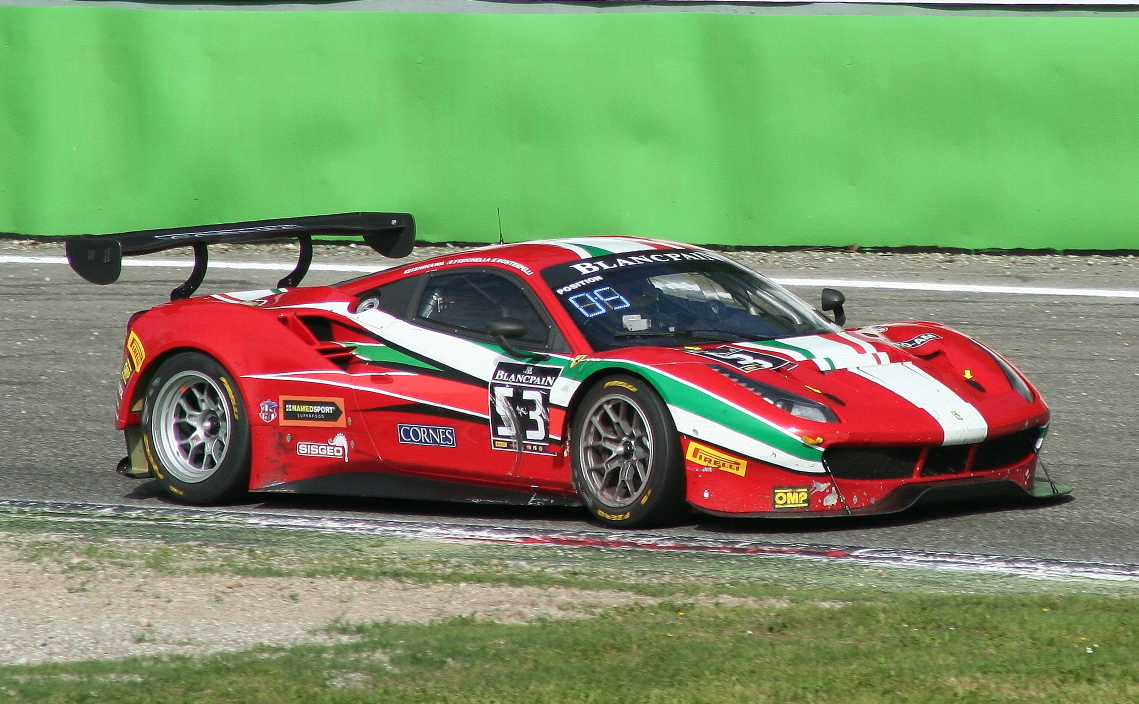
Bontempelli driving a Ferrari 488 GT3 for AF Corse at Monza in 2016.

In 2016, Bontempelli joined AF Corse to compete in the Pro-Am class of the Blancpain GT Series Endurance Cup, sharing a Ferrari 488 GT3 with Giancarlo Fisichella and Motoaki Ishikawa as he took a lone podium at Monza and topped qualifying at Le Castellet. Towards the end of the year, Bontempelli made a one-off return to International GT Open for Scuderia Cameron Glickenhaus, driving their SCG 003 alongside Beniamino Caccia. Another season in the Blancpain GT Series Endurance Cup which saw Olivier Beretta replace Fisichella ensued in 2017, but Bontempelli found more success in a part-time campaign in Italian GT for Ferrari-fielding MP1 Corse, in which he scored two wins and ended the season seventh in points.

Switching to one-make Lamborghini competition for 2018, Bontempelli drove for Iron Lynx in Super Trofeo Europe alongside Emanuele Zonzini in Pro-Am, finishing runner-up in both the European series and the World Finals. During 2018, Bontempelli also raced on a part-time basis in the Blancpain GT Series Endurance Cup for AF Corse–run cars, most notably taking a Pro-Am podium at Barcelona. In 2019, Bontempelli ventured over to LMP3 competition, joining Oregon Team to compete in the European Le Mans Series alongside Damiano Fioravanti and Gustas Grinbergas. After that, Bontempelli continued with the team to race in Lamborghini Super Trofeo Europe the following year, as well as making a one-off appearance in the GT World Challenge Europe Endurance Cup for AF Corse at Le Castellet.

Another part-time campaign for Bontempelli in the GT World Challenge Europe Endurance Cup for AF Corse then followed in 2021, in a year in which he also made a surprise debut in the WRC3 Championship for PA Racing at the ACI Rally Monza. In 2022, Bontempelli returned to Italian GT in GT Cup machinery, racing part-time for Tsunami RT in the Sprint Cup and SR&R in the Endurance Cup, most notably taking an Am class win in the latter at Mugello. After making his WRC2 debut in early 2023 at Montecarlo, Bontempelli joined DL Racing to compete in the GT Cup Am class of the Italian GT Championship Endurance Cup for the rest of the year.

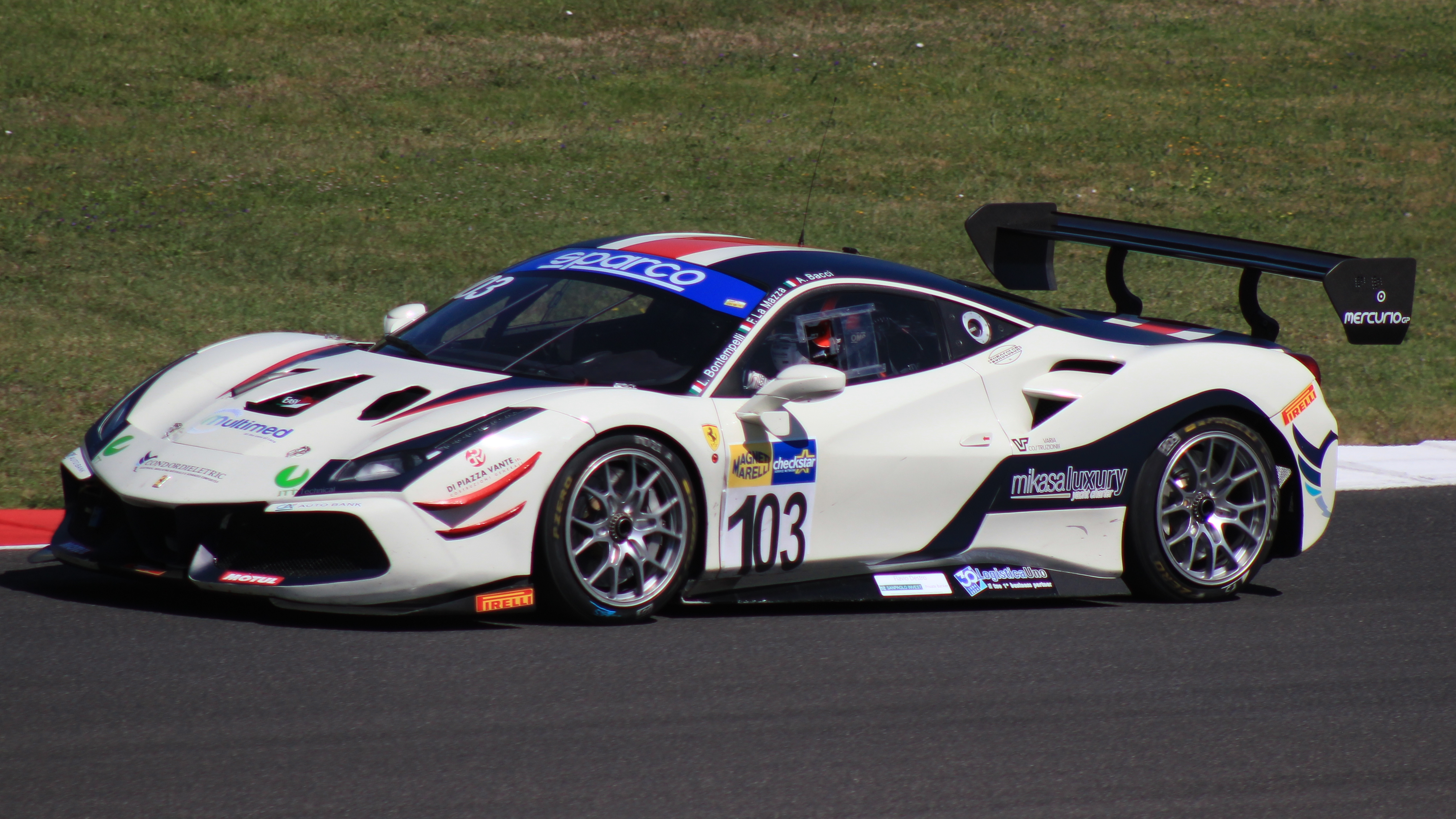
Bontempelli's Ferrari 488 Challenge Evo at Mugello in 2024.

In 2024, Bontempelli returned to GT3 machinery, competing in the majority of the Italian GT Championship Sprint Cup for Ferrari-aligned Easy Race alongside Enzo Trulli, most notably taking a Pro-Am podium on his return at Imola. Continuing with Easy Race for 2025, Bontempelli stepped back to GT Cup machinery to contest the Italian GT Championship Endurance Cup in the GT Cup Division 2 Pro-Am class. In his first season in the category, Bontempelli took a lone win at Monza and finished fourth in points. Towards the end of the year, Bontempelli made a one-off appearance in GT Cup Open Europe for the same team at Monza, winning race two outright after starting 22nd. In 2026, Bontempelli switched to the Italian GT Championship Sprint Cup but remained in the class, driving for Porsche-fielding PS Performance at Imola, before switching to Ferrari customer team Master Service for Vallelunga and then Easy Race for the final two rounds, as he ended the year runner-up in the GT Cup Division 2 Am standings with six podiums to his name.

== Racing record ==
=== Racing career summary ===
Season	Series	Team	Races	Wins	Poles	F/Laps	Podiums	Points	Position
1993	Formula Junior Monza – Cadetti								
1994	Formula Junior Monza – Cadetti								9th
1995	Formula Junior Monza – Cadetti								4th
1995	Formula Junior Monza – Trofeo AICA								**3rd**
1996	Formula Junior Monza – Cadetti								**2nd**
1996	Formula Junior Monza – Trofeo AICA								**2nd**
1997	Italian Renault Megane Cup								**2nd**
1998	Italian Renault Megane Cup – Coppa Michelin								**2nd**
1999	Coppa Megane Elf Sport Cup								
1999	Formula Junior Monza – Cadetti								
2000	Formula Renault 2000 Italia	A.S. Fast Wheels	10	0	0	0	0	0	27th
2001	Formula Renault 2000 Italia	Fast Wheels Competition	3	0	0	0	0	0	39th
2001	Coupe d'Europe Renault							8	23rd
2002	Formula Renault Monza	Fast Wheels Competition						36	13th
2002	Ferrari Challenge Italy – Trofeo Pirelli								
2003	Euro GT Series – NGT	Team Scuderia Veregra	2	0	0	0	0	11	13th
2003	Ferrari Challenge Italy – Trofeo Pirelli								5th
2004	Ferrari Challenge Italy – Trofeo Pirelli								5th
2005	Ferrari Challenge Italy – Trofeo Pirelli							112	6th
2005	Ferrari Challenge Europe – Trofeo Pirelli	Rossocorsa						15	14th
2005	Italian GT Championship – GT2	GPC Sport	2	0	0	0	1	12	18th
2006	Ferrari Challenge Italy – 360 Challenge	Rossocorsa						252	**1st**
2006	Ferrari Challenge World Finals – 360 Challenge	Rossocorsa							**1st**
2006	Italian GT Championship – GT1	DR Sport Equipe	2	0	0	0	2	12	11th
2006	FIA GT3 European Championship	Reiter Engineering	2	0	0	0	1	6	21st
2007	Ferrari Challenge Italy – Trofeo Pirelli	Rossocorsa						247	**3rd**
2007	Italian GT Championship – GT2	Edil Cris Team	6	2	0	0	4	63	8th
2007	Spanish GT Championship – GTA	Playteam SRL	2	0	0	0	1	12	8th
2008	International GT Open – GTA	Racing Team Edil Cris	14	0	0	0	3	16	12th
2008	Eurocup Mégane Trophy	Oregon Team	2	0	0	0	0	0	NC†
2009	Italian GT Championship – GT3	Kessel Racing						149	**1st**
2009	International GT Open – GTS	Kessel Racing	8	0	1	0	2	26	7th
2009	Eurocup Mégane Trophy	Oregon Team	4	0	0	0	0	4	19th
2009	FIA GT3 European Championship	Kessel Racing	4	1	0	0	3	24	8th
2010	Italian GT Championship – GT3	Kessel Racing	12	2	0	0	6	91	5th
2010	International GT Open – GTS	Kessel Racing	16	3	0	0	8	72	**3rd**
2010	Porsche Supercup	Petricorse Motorsport	1	0	0	0	0	0	NC†
2010	Formula Junior Monza	Cavallini	1	0	0	0	0	6	24th
2011	International GT Open – GTS	Kessel Racing	16	7	0	0	12	116	**1st**
2011	Blancpain Endurance Series – GT3 Pro-Am	De Lorenzi Racing	1	0	0	0	0	0	NC
2011	Ferrari Challenge Italy – Trofeo Pirelli	Kessel Racing							**2nd**
2011	Ferrari Challenge World Finals – Trofeo Pirelli	Kessel Racing							**1st**
2012	International GT Open – GTS	Ombra Racing	12	1	0	0	2	25	8th
2012	International GTSprint Series – GTS2	Kessel Racing	2	0	0	0	2	32	6th
2012	Blancpain Endurance Series – Pro-Am	Kessel Racing	1	0	0	0	0	0	NC
2013	International GT Open – GTS	Kessel Racing	16	1	0	0	6	56	**2nd**
2013	Blancpain Endurance Series – Gentlemen	Kessel Racing	1	0	0	0	1	18	23rd
2014	International GT Open – GTS	Eurotech Engineering	2	0	0	0	0	22	12th
2014	International GT Open – GTS	Nova Race	2	1	0	0	1	22	12th
2014	International GT Open – GTS	Ombra Racing	2	0	0	0	1	22	12th
2014	Italian GT Championship – GT3	Nova Race	2	0	0	0	0	11	31st
2014	GT4 European Series – G50	Nova Race	2	0	0	0	0	0	NC†
2014	Blancpain Endurance Series – Am	Sport Garage	1	0	0	0	0	29	12th
2015	Ginetta Euro Series	Nova Race	2	0	0	0	0	14	22nd
2015	Italian GT Championship – GT3	Team Malucelli	6	0	0	0	0	16	29th
2015	Porsche Supercup	Team Dinamic	2	0	0	0	0	0	NC†
2015	International GT Open – Pro-Am	Drivex School	2	0	0	0	0	0	20th
2015	6 Hours of Vallelunga	Oregon Team	1	0	0	0	0	—N/a	4th
2016	Italian GT Championship – Super GT3	Drive Technology Italia Srl	8	0	0	0	0	34.5	15th
2016	Blancpain GT Series Endurance Cup – Pro-Am	AF Corse	5	0	0	0	1	21	24th
2016	Intercontinental GT Challenge – Am	AF Corse	1	0	0	0	0	0	NC
2016	International GT Open – Am	Scuderia Cameron Glickenhaus	2	0	0	0	1	0	NC†
2016	Italian GT Championship – GT3	Scuderia Baldini 27 Network	2	1	0	0	2	35	11th
2017	Blancpain GT Series Endurance Cup – Pro-Am	AF Corse	5	0	0	0	0	26	18th
2017	Intercontinental GT Challenge	AF Corse	1	0	0	0	0	0	NC
2017	Italian GT Championship – GT3	MP1 Corse	6	2	2	0	4	78	7th
2018	Blancpain GT Series Endurance Cup – Pro-Am	961 Corse	1	0	0	0	0	45	7th
2018	Blancpain GT Series Endurance Cup – Pro-Am	AF Corse	2	0	0	0	1	45	7th
2018	Lamborghini Super Trofeo Europe – Pro-Am	Iron Lynx	10	2	0	0	8	87	**2nd**
2018	Lamborghini Super Trofeo World Finals – Pro-Am	Iron Lynx	2	0	0	0	2	24	**2nd**
2019	European Le Mans Series – LMP3	Oregon Team	6	0	0	0	0	20	12th
2019	Italian GT Championship Endurance Cup – GT Light	Iron Lynx	1	0	0	0	0	0	NC
2019	GT Cup Open Europe – Am	Selleslagh Racing Team	2	0	0	0	0	0	NC†
2020	Lamborghini Super Trofeo Europe – Pro-Am	Oregon Team	8						
2020	GT World Challenge Europe Endurance Cup – Pro-Am	AF Corse	1	0	0	0	0	0	NC
2021	GT World Challenge Europe Endurance Cup – Pro-Am	AF Corse	2	0	0	0	0	8	30th
2021	WRC3 Championship	PA Racing	1	0	—N/a	—N/a	0	0	NC
2022	Italian GT Championship Sprint Cup – GT Cup Pro-Am	Tsunami RT	4	0	0	0	0	7	NC
2022	Italian GT Championship Endurance Cup – GT Cup Am	SR&R	2	1	0	0	1	37	NC
2023	WRC2 Championship	Lorenzo Bontempelli	1	0	—N/a	—N/a	0	0	NC
2023	Italian GT Championship Sprint Cup – GT Cup Am	SR&R	4	0	0	0	1	20	NC
2023	Ultimate Cup Series Sprint GT Touring Challenge – 3A	SR&R	2	2	0	0	2	48	7th
2023	Italian GT Championship Endurance Cup – GT Cup Am	Lamborghini Roma DL Racing	3	0	0	0	0	4	8th
2024	Ultimate Cup Series GT-Sprint Cup – UCS1	SR&R SRL	2	2	0	0	2	32	5th
2024	Italian GT Championship Sprint Cup – GT3 Pro-Am	Easy Race	5	0	0	0	1	38	6th
2024	Italian GT Championship Endurance Cup – GT Cup Pro-Am	Easy Race	2	0	0	0	0	16	NC
2025	Italian GT Championship Endurance Cup – GT Cup Div.2 Pro-Am	Easy Race	4	1	0	0	2	76	4th
2025	GT Cup Open Europe – Pro-Am	Easy Race	2	1	0	0	1	0	NC†
2026	Italian GT Championship Sprint Cup – GT Cup Div.2 Am	PS Performance	2	0	0	0	2	100	**2nd**
2026	Italian GT Championship Sprint Cup – GT Cup Div.2 Am	Master Service	2	0	0	0	2	100	**2nd**
2026	Italian GT Championship Sprint Cup – GT Cup Div.2 Am	Easy Race	4	0	0	0	2	100	**2nd**

* Season still in progress.
^{†} As Bontempelli was a guest driver, he was ineligible for points.

=== Complete FIA GT3 European Championship results ===
Year	Team	Car	Engine	1	2	3	4	5	6	7	8	9	10	11	12	Pos.	Points
2006	Reiter Engineering	Lamborghini Gallardo GT3	Lamborghini 5.0 L V10	SIL; 1	SIL; 2	OSC; 1	OSC; 2	SPA; 1	SPA; 2	DIJ; 1	DIJ; 2	MUG; 1; 12	MUG; 2; 3			21st	6
2009	Kessel Racing	Ferrari 430 GT3 Scuderia	Ferrari 4.3 L V8	SIL; 1	SIL; 2	ADR; 1	ADR; 2	OSC; 1	OSC; 2	ALG; 1; 17	ALG; 2; 3	LEC; 1	LEC; 2	ZOL; 1; 2	ZOL; 2; 1	8th	24

=== Complete GT World Challenge Europe results ===
==== GT World Challenge Europe Endurance Cup ====
(key) (Races in bold indicate pole position; races in italics indicate fastest lap)

Year	Team	Car	Class	1	2	3	4	5	6	7	8	Pos.	Points
2011	De Lorenzi Racing	Porsche 997 GT3-R	GT3 Pro-Am	MNZ	NAV	SPA; 6H ?	SPA; 12H ?	SPA; 24H; Ret	MAG	SIL		NC	0
2012	Kessel Racing	Ferrari 458 Italia GT3	Pro-Am	MNZ	SIL	LEC	SPA; 6H ?	SPA; 12H ?	SPA; 24H; 27	NÜR	NAV	NC	0
2013	Kessel Racing	Ferrari 458 Italia GT3	Pro-Am	MNZ; 20	SIL	LEC	SPA; 6H	SPA; 12H	SPA; 24H	NÜR		23rd	18
2014	Sport Garage	Ferrari 458 Italia GT3	Am	MNZ	SIL	LEC	SPA; 6H; 24	SPA; 12H; 29	SPA; 24H; 32	NÜR		12th	29
2016	AF Corse	Ferrari 488 GT3	Pro-Am	MNZ; 10	SIL; 34	LEC; 25	SPA; 6H; 65	SPA; 12H; 65	SPA; 24H; Ret	NÜR; 37		24th	21
2017	AF Corse	Ferrari 488 GT3	Pro-Am	MNZ; Ret	SIL; 38	LEC; Ret	SPA; 6H; 34	SPA; 12H; 25	SPA; 24H; 19	CAT; 24		18th	26
2018	961 Corse	Ferrari 488 GT3	Pro-Am	MNZ; 28	SIL	LEC						14th	33
2018	AF Corse	Ferrari 488 GT3	Pro-Am				SPA; 6H; 35	SPA; 12H; 33	SPA; 24H; 21	CAT; 25		14th	33
2020	AF Corse	Ferrari 488 GT3	Pro-Am	IMO	NÜR	SPA; 6H	SPA; 12H	SPA; 24H	LEC; Ret			NC	0
2021	AF Corse	Ferrari 488 GT3 Evo 2020	Pro-Am	MNZ; 29	LEC; Ret	SPA; 6H	SPA; 12H	SPA; 24H	NÜR	CAT		30th	8

=== Complete European Le Mans Series results ===
Year	Team	Class	Car	Engine	1	2	3	4	5	6	Pos.	Points
2019	Oregon Team	LMP3	Norma M30	Nissan VK50VE 5.0 L V8	LEC; 4	MNZ; Ret	CAT; 10	SIL; Ret	SPA; 7	ALG; Ret	12th	20
