= Lorenzo Casè =

Italian racing driver (born 1974)

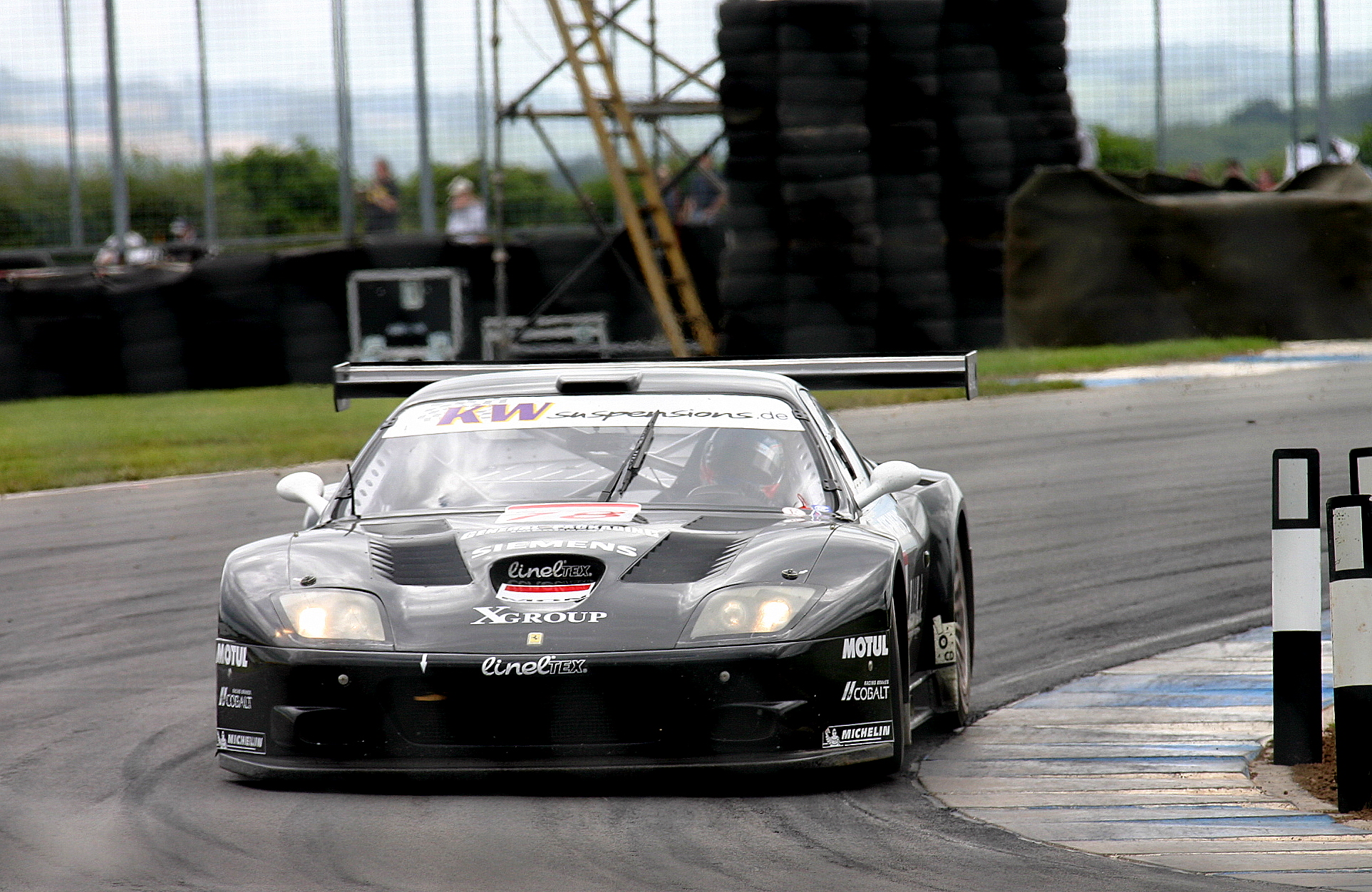
- Casè in 2004
- Nationality: (Italy) Italian
- Born: 18 April 1974 (age 52) Confienza, Italy
- Categorisation: FIA Gold (until 2012); FIA Silver (2013–2023); FIA Bronze (2024–)

Championship titles
- 2024 2014 2009 2007: Italian GT Championship Sprint Cup – GT Cup Div. 1 Am; Italian GT Championship – GT3; Ferrari Challenge World Finals – Trofeo Pirelli; Italian GT Championship – GT2

Lorenzo Casè (born 18 April 1974) is an Italian racing driver who last competed for AF Corse in the Italian GT Championship.

== Career ==
Casè began his racing career in 1999, competing in the Alfa GTV Cup 3000 Italian Championship. After three seasons in entry-level one-make series, Casè made his Italian GT debut in 2003, driving for Mastercar in the N-GT class aboard their Ferrari 360. Joining JMB Racing for the following year, Casè won at Imola and Magione to kick off the season, before winning both Misano races and race one at Vallelunga to secure third in points.

Continuing with JMB for 2005, Casè scored a lone win at the Hungaroring and a fifth-place points finish in GT1, before switching to the FIA GT3 European Championship with Maserati-fielding AF Corse. Returning to the Italian GT Championship for 2007, Casè remained with AF Corse, albeit under their Advanced Engineering banner, taking wins at Adria and Magione to secure the GT2 title aboard the team's Ferrari F430, which he shared with Stefano Livio. After a part-time season with them in the following year's International GT Open season, Casè primarily raced in Ferrari Challenge in 2009, finishing fifth in the Italian series and winning the World Finals at the end of the year. During 2009, Casè also raced with AF Corse on a part-time basis in the GT4 European Cup, scoring a pair of podiums between the Spa and Zolder rounds.

The following year, Casè made a one-off appearance in the LMP2 class of the Le Mans Series for Racing Box, and the 6 Hours of Vallelunga for Maserati Corse. Returning to AF Corse for 2011, Casè began the year by finishing second overall at the Dubai 24 Hour, a feat he repeated at the 6 Hours of Vallelunga later that year. During 2011, Casè also raced in Maserati Trophy Europe on a part-time basis. Returning to Ferrari Challenge Europe for 2012, Casè finished ninth in the Trofeo Pirelli with a win at Vallelunga. In parallel, Casé also raced part-time in the International GTSprint Series for Scuderia Baldini, scoring GTSCup class wins at Imola, Mugello and Vallelunga to take fourth in the class standings.

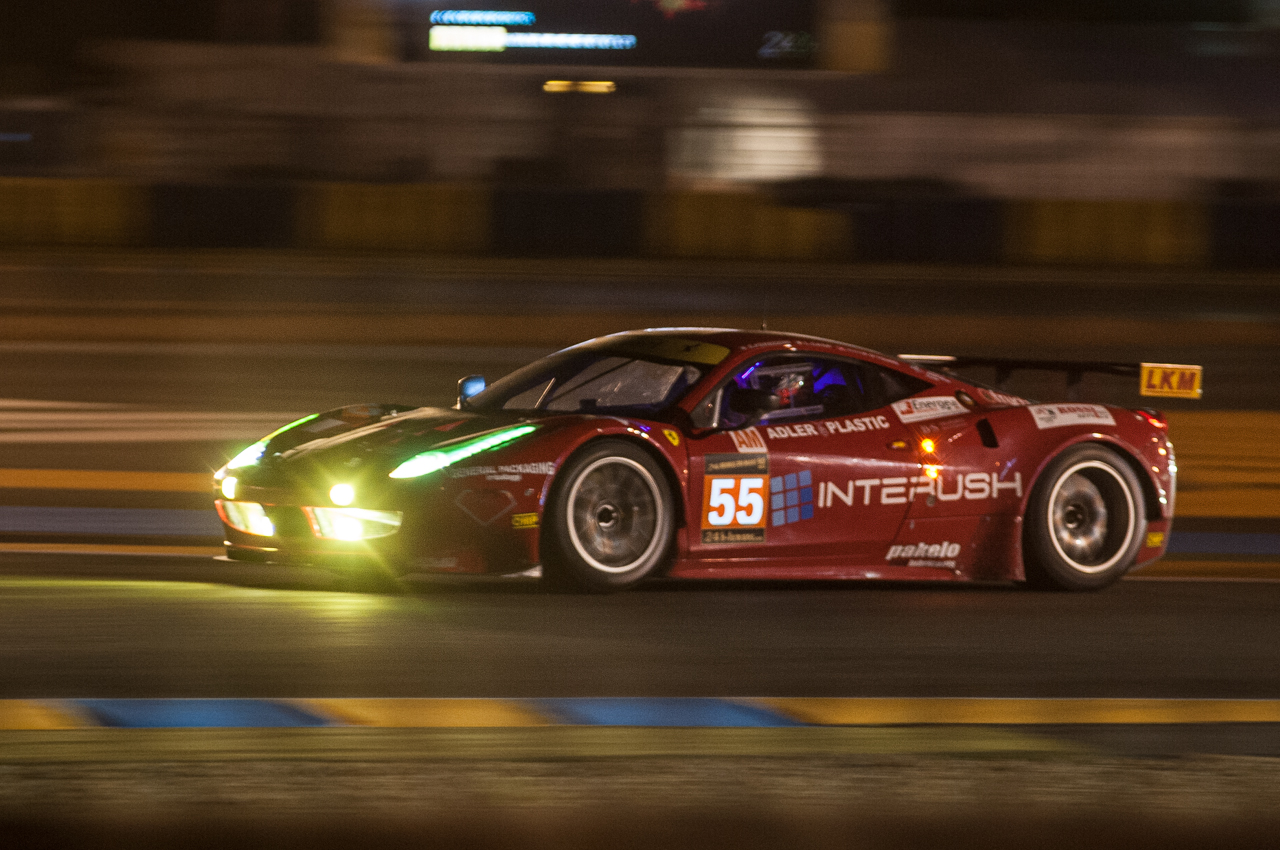
Casè driving his Ferrari 458 Italia GT2 at night during the 2013 24 Hours of Le Mans.

Reuniting with AF Corse for 2013, Casè began the year by finishing second at the Dubai 24 Hour, before racing with them in the GTC class of the European Le Mans Series, taking four podiums and securing runner-up honours in class along with Stefano Gai and Andrea Rizzoli. During 2013, Casè also made his debut at the 24 Hours of Le Mans, finished second in LMGTE Am with Darryl O'Young and Piergiuseppe Perazzini, in addition to placing third at the 6 Hours of Vallelunga and making one-off appearances in Ferrari Challenge and the International GTSprint Series. Continuing with Ferrari machinery for 2014, Casè reunited with Scuderia Baldini to race in the Italian GT Championship, taking a lone win at Imola and six other podiums to secure the GT3 title with Raffaele Giammaria. During 2014, Casè also raced in the first two rounds of the United SportsCar Championship for Scuderia Corsa in GTD, as well as competing for AF Corse in select races of the FIA World Endurance Championship and European Le Mans Series in LMGTE, including a return to the 24 Hours of Le Mans.

Staying with Scuderia Baldini to defend his Italian GT title the following year, Casè won at Vallelunga and scored four other podiums to end the year sixth in the GT3 standings. In 2016, Casè switched to Lamborghini-fielding Antonelli Motorsport for a one-off appearance in the Blancpain GT Series Endurance Cup and the first two events in the SuperGTCup class of the Italian GT Championship. Later that year, Casè reunited with Scuderia Baldini to race in the final two rounds of the season in the GT3 class, finishing on the podium in all four races and scoring a win at Mugello.

In 2017, Casè joined AF Corse–run Spirit of Race to compete in the Silver Cup of the Blancpain GT Series Sprint Cup, taking four podiums to secure a third-place points finish in class with Phil Quaife. Following that, Casè competed in the 2019 and 2021 editions of the Italian GT Championship Sprint Cup for Easy Race and AF Corse, scoring a pair of podiums in each season to take eighth and sixth in the GT3 and GT3 Am standings respectively. Three years later, Casè returned to AF Corse to once again contest the Italian GT Championship Sprint Cup, clinching the GT Cup Division 1 Am title after taking three wins and two other podiums.

== Racing record ==
=== Racing career summary ===
Season	Series	Team	Races	Wins	Poles	F/Laps	Podiums	Points	Position
1999	Alfa GTV Cup 3000 Italian Championship								
2000	Alfa GTV Cup 3000 Italian Championship								
2000	Peugeot 106 Italian Championship								
2000	Peugeot 306 Italian Championship								
2001	Peugeot 106 Italian Championship								**2nd**
2002	Renault Clio Trophy Europe							42	9th
2003	Italian GT Championship	Mastercar	6	0	0	0	0		
2004	Italian GT Championship	JMB Racing	16	5	3	3	8	169	**3rd**
2004	FIA GT Championship – GT	JMB Racing	1	0	0	0	0	0	NC
2004	Spanish GT Championship – GTA	Canarias Sport Club	1	0	0	0	0		
2005	Italian GT Championship – GT1	JMB Racing	10	1	0	0	1	80	5th
2005	Italian GT Championship – GT2	JMB Racing	2	0	0	0	0	14	17th
2005	Ferrari Challenge Italy – Trofeo Pirelli							5	31st
2006	FIA GT3 European Championship	AF Corse	8	0	0	0	0	0	NC
2006	Ferrari Challenge Italy – Trofeo Pirelli							24	12th
2006	Ferrari Challenge Europe – Trofeo Pirelli	Ferrari GB Dealer Team						43	12th
2006	Italian GT Championship – GT1	Kessel Racing	2	0	0	0	2	24	12th
2007	Italian GT Championship – GT2	Advanced Engineering	14	2	0	0	9	116	**1st**
2007	International GT Open – GTA	Advanced Engineering	2	0	0	0	0		
2007	FIA GT Championship – GT1	Kessel	2	0	0	0	0	0	NC
2007	FIA GT Championship – GT2	Racing Team Edil Cris	1	0	0	0	0	9.5	21st
2008	International GT Open – GTA	Advanced Engineering	9	0	0	0	0	4	26th
2009	Ferrari Challenge Italy – Trofeo Pirelli							126	5th
2009	Ferrari Challenge Europe – Trofeo Pirelli							34	10th
2009	GT4 European Cup – GT4	AF Corse	4	0	0	0	2	22	9th
2009	FIA GT Championship – GT2	Pecom Racing	1	0	0	0	0	0	NC
2009	Ferrari Challenge World Finals – Trofeo Pirelli								**1st**
2010	Le Mans Series – LMP2	Racing Box	1	0	0	0	0	9	20th
2010	6 Hours of Vallelunga	Maserati Corse	1	0	0	0	0	—N/a	15th
2011	Dubai 24 Hour – A6	AF Corse	1	0	0	0	1	—N/a	**2nd**
2011	Trofeo Maserati Europe		4	0	1	0	1		
2011	Italian GT Championship – GT Cup	Scuderia Baldini 27 Mode	6	0	0	0	0	7	29th
2011	International GTSprint Series – GTCup	Scuderia Baldini 27 Mode	2	1	0	1	1	21	18th
2011	6 Hours of Vallelunga	AF Corse	1	0	0	0	1	—N/a	**2nd**
2012	Ferrari Challenge Europe – Trofeo Pirelli	Motor Piacenza	9	1	2	0	2	90	9th
2012	International GTSprint Series – GTSCup	Scuderia Baldini 27 Network	8	3	0	0	5	101	4th
2012	Italian GT Championship – GT3	AF Corse	2	0	0	0	0	2	26th
2012	6 Hours of Vallelunga	AF Corse	1	0	0	0	0	—N/a	8th
2013	Dubai 24 Hour – A6 Pro	AF Corse	1	0	0	0	1	—N/a	**2nd**
2013	European Le Mans Series – GTC	AF Corse	5	0	1	0	4	76	**2nd**
2013	FIA World Endurance Championship – LMGTE Am	AF Corse	1	0	0	0	1	36	16th
2013	24 Hours of Le Mans – LMGTE Am	AF Corse	1	0	0	0	1	—N/a	**2nd**
2013	Ferrari Challenge Europe – Trofeo Pirelli	Forza Service	3	2	0	0	3	69	8th
2013	International GTSprint Series	Scuderia Baldini 27 Network	2	1	0	0	2	0	NC†
2013	6 Hours of Vallelunga	Black Team	1	0	0	0	1	—N/a	**3rd**
2014	United SportsCar Championship – GTD	Scuderia Corsa	2	0	0	0	0	37	52nd
2014	Italian GT Championship – GT3	Scuderia Baldini 27 Network	14	1	1	0	7	131	**1st**
2014	FIA World Endurance Championship – LMGTE Am	AF Corse	2	0	0	0	0	6	24th
2014	European Le Mans Series – LMGTE	AF Corse	1	0	0	0	0	0.5	26th
2014	24 Hours of Le Mans – LMGTE Am	AF Corse	1	0	0	0	0	—N/a	DNF
2015	Italian GT Championship – GT3	Scuderia Baldini 27 Network	14	1	0	0	5	107	6th
2016	Blancpain GT Series Endurance Cup – Pro-Am	Antonelli Motorsport	1	0	0	0	0	0	NC
2016	Italian GT Championship – SuperGTCup	Antonelli Motorsport	4	0	0	0	1	23	24th
2016	Italian GT Championship – GT3	Scuderia Baldini 27 Network	4	1	0	0	4	65	13th
2017	Blancpain GT Series Sprint Cup – Silver	Spirit of Race	7	0	1	0	5	65	**3rd**
2019	Italian GT Championship Sprint Cup – GT3	Easy Race	6	0	0	0	2	34	8th
2021	Italian GT Championship Sprint Cup – GT3 Am	AF Corse	8	0	0	0	2	49	6th
2024	Italian GT Championship Sprint Cup – GT Cup Div. 1 Am	AF Corse	8	3	3	3	5	98	**1st**

^{†} As Casè was a guest driver, he was ineligible to score points.

=== Complete FIA GT Championship results ===
(key) (Races in bold indicate pole position) (Races in italics indicate fastest lap)

Year	Team	Car	Class	1	2	3	4	5	6	7	8	9	10	11	12	13	Pos.	Pts
2004	JMB Racing	Ferrari 575 GTC	GT	MNZ	VAL	MAG	HOC	BRN	DON; 12	SPA; 6H	SPA; 12H	SPA; 24H	IMO	OSC	DUB	ZHU	NC	0
2007	Kessel	Ferrari 575 GTC	GT1	ZHU	SIL	BUC; Ret	MNZ; Ret	OSC									NC	0
2007	Racing Team Edil Cris	Ferrari F430 GTC	GT2						SPA; 6H; 3	SPA; 12H; 4	SPA; 24H; 5	ADR	BRN	NOG	ZOL		21st	9.5
2009	Pecom Racing	Ferrari F430 GTC	GT2	SIL	ADR	OSC	SPA; 6H ?	SPA; 12H ?	SPA; 24H; Ret	BUC	ALG	LEC	ZOL				7th	27

=== Complete FIA GT3 European Championship results ===
(key) (Races in bold indicate pole position; races in italics indicate fastest lap)

Year	Entrant	Chassis	Engine	1	2	3	4	5	6	7	8	9	10	Pos.	Points
2006	AF Corse	Maserati Gran Sport Light	Maserati F136 4.2 L V8	SIL; 1; 29	SIL; 2; 32	OSC; 1 Ret	OSC; 2; 28	SPA; 1; 15	SPA; 2; 18	DIJ; 1; 28	DIJ; 2; 14	MUG; 1	MUG; 2	NC	0

=== Complete European Le Mans Series results ===
(key) (Races in bold indicate pole position; results in italics indicate fastest lap)

Year	Entrant	Class	Chassis	Engine	1	2	3	4	5	Rank	Points
2010	Racing Box	LMP2	Lola B09/80	Judd DB 3.4 L V8	LEC	SPA	ALG	HUN	SIL; 5	20th	9
2013	AF Corse	GTC	Ferrari 458 Italia GT3	Ferrari F136 4.5 L V8	SIL; 2	IMO; 2	RBR; 2	**HUN**; 3	LEC; 7	2nd	76
2014	AF Corse	LMGTE	Ferrari 458 Italia GT2	Ferrari F136 4.5 L V8	SIL	IMO; 12	RBR	LEC	EST	26th	0.5

=== Complete FIA World Endurance Championship results ===
(key) (Races in bold indicate pole position; races in italics indicate fastest lap)

Year	Entrant	Class	Chassis	Engine	1	2	3	4	5	6	7	8	Rank	Points
2013	AF Corse	LMGTE Am	Ferrari 458 Italia GT2	Ferrari F136 4.5 L V8	SIL	SPA	LMS; 2	SÃO	COA	FUJ	SHA	BHR	16th	36
2014	AF Corse	LMGTE Am	Ferrari 458 Italia GT2	Ferrari F136 4.5 L V8	SIL	SPA; 7	LMS; Ret	COA	FUJ	SHA	BHR	SÃO	24th	6

=== Complete 24 Hours of Le Mans results ===
Year	Team	Co-Drivers	Car	Class	Laps	Pos.	Class Pos.
2013	(Italy) AF Corse	(Hong Kong) Darryl O'Young (Italy) Piergiuseppe Perazzini	Ferrari 458 Italia GT2	LMGTE Am	305	26th	**2nd**
2014	(Italy) AF Corse	(United States) Peter Mann (Italy) Raffaele Giammaria	Ferrari 458 Italia GT2	LMGTE Am	115	DNF	DNF

=== Complete IMSA SportsCar Championship results ===
(key) (Races in bold indicate pole position; races in italics indicate fastest lap)

Year	Entrant	Class	Make	Engine	1	2	3	4	5	6	7	8	9	10	11	Rank	Points
2014	Scuderia Corsa	GTD	Ferrari 458 Italia GT3	Ferrari F136 4.5 L V8	DAY; 11	SEB; 18	LGA	DET	WGL	MOS	IND	ELK	VIR	COA	PET	52nd	37

=== Complete GT World Challenge Europe results ===
==== GT World Challenge Europe Endurance Cup ====
(Races in bold indicate pole position) (Races in italics indicate fastest lap)

Year	Team	Car	Class	1	2	3	4	5	6	7	Pos.	Points
2016	Antonelli Motorsport	Lamborghini Huracán GT3	Pro-Am	MNZ; 32	SIL	LEC	SPA; 6H	SPA; 12H	SPA; 24H	NÜR	NC	0

==== GT World Challenge Europe Sprint Cup ====
(key) (Races in bold indicate pole position) (Races in italics indicate fastest lap)

Year	Team	Car	Class	1	2	3	4	5	6	7	8	9	10	Pos.	Points
2017	Spirit of Race	Ferrari 488 GT3	Silver	MIS; QR; Ret	MIS; CR; DNS	BRH; QR; 25	BRH; CR; 19	ZOL; QR; 25	ZOL; CR; 17	**HUN**; **QR**; 22	HUN; CR; 19	NÜR; QR; DNS	NÜR; CR; DNS	3rd	65
