= Toni Vilander =

Finnish racing driver

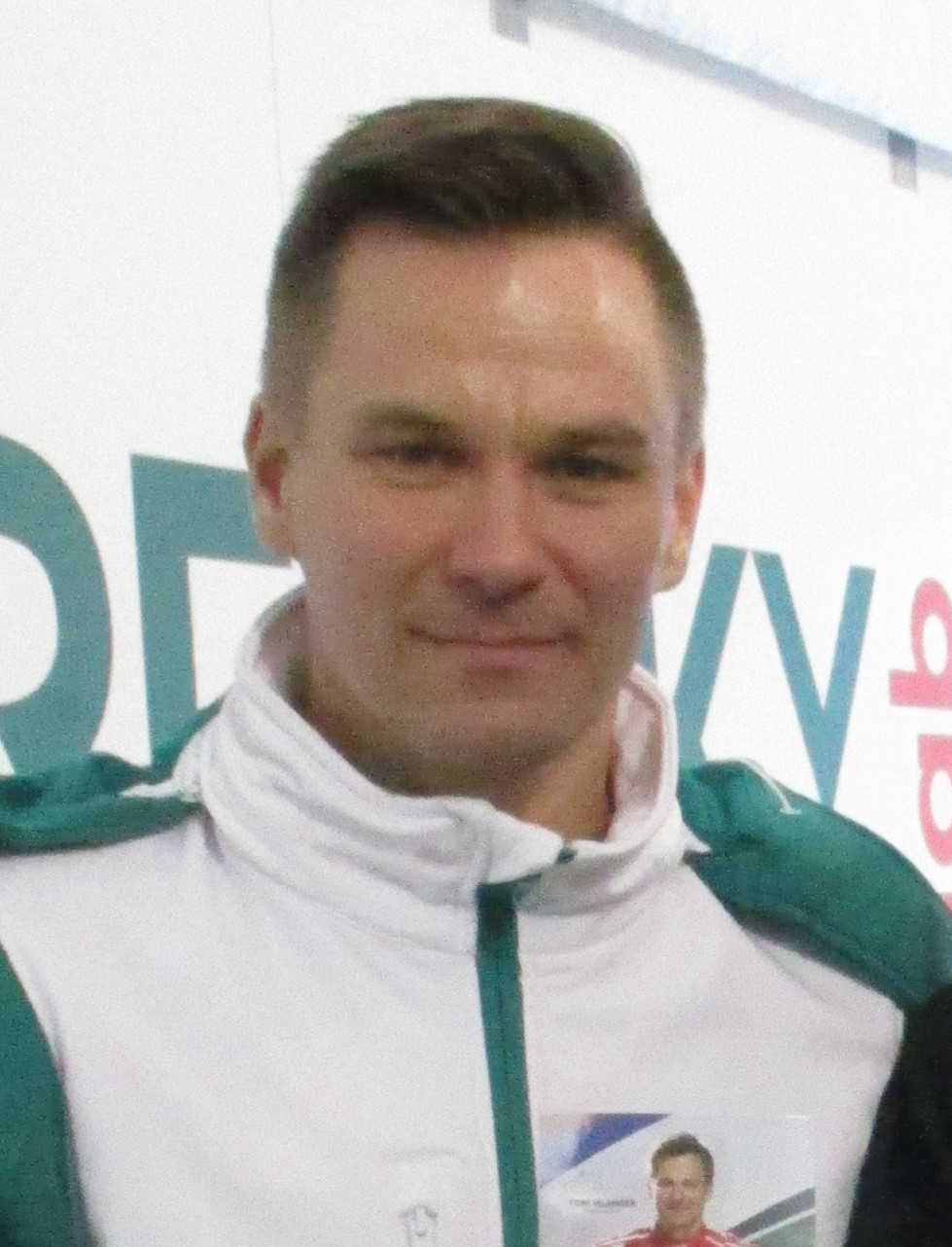
- Vilander in 2016
- Nationality: (Finland) Finnish
- Born: Toni Markus Vilander; 25 July 1980 (age 46) Kankaanpää, Finland
- Categorisation: FIA Platinum

24 Hours of Le Mans career
- Years: 2008, 2010–
- Teams: AF Corse; Risi Competizione
- Best finish: 13th (2011)
- Class wins: 2 (2012, 2014)

Toni Markus Vilander (born 25 July 1980) is a Finnish professional racing driver who currently drives for the Risi Competizione Ferrari team in various categories of sports car racing.

After a single-seater career which reached the level of the GP2 Series in 2005, Vilander switched to GT racing. He has had numerous successes with AF Corse, winning the 2012 and 2014 24 Hours of Le Mans races in the LMGTE Pro class, as well as the FIA World Endurance Cup for GT Drivers in 2014 and also the GT2 class championship of the FIA GT Championship in 2007 and 2008.

== Career ==
Born in Kankaanpää, Vilander started racing karts at the age of five, winning the Junior A class of the Finnish Karting Championship in 1995, and both the German and Oceanic championships in 1999. He then upgraded to open-wheel cars in 2001. By 2004, he was competing in Italian Formula 3 with the Coloni team, and upgraded to Italian Formula 3000 in 2005, as well as competing in the Italian GT series.

However, trouble was brewing in the Coloni GP2 team, as lead driver Gianmaria Bruni had a row and left mid-season. Vilander got the call-up from Coloni to be Bruni's temporary substitute and competed in the Italian and Belgian rounds of the championship. He proved a competent midfield runner, finishing 15th, eighth, 14th and 13th in the four races in which he took part. For the season-closing double-header in Bahrain, Coloni chose to replace Vilander with Ferdinando Monfardini, and Toni went back to his normal drives. Vilander finished 25th overall in the series' inaugural year with no points, but was more successful in Italian Formula 3000, where he finished fourth with 23 points, and more successful still in Italian GT2, where he was crowned champion with his co-driver Alessandro Pier Guidi, scoring a total of 182 points.

In January 2006, Vilander, Pier Guidi and Giambattista Giannoccaro won the GT2 class of the Mil Milhas Brasil race and were placed fourth overall, driving a Ferrari 360. Using that same car, he went on to win that year's GT2 class of the Italian GT Championship. He also won the GT1 class of the 2006 Italian GT Championship with Giannoccaro, driving a Maserati MC12. For one race, he made a guest appearance in the FIA GT Championship.

Continuing his sportscar success, Vilander won the GT2 class of the 2007 FIA GT Championship with teammate Dirk Müller. In 2008 he teamed up with Gianmaria Bruni and retained his title. He also competed in the American Le Mans Series alongside Jaime Melo in a Ferrari 458 Italia GTC for Risi Competizione.

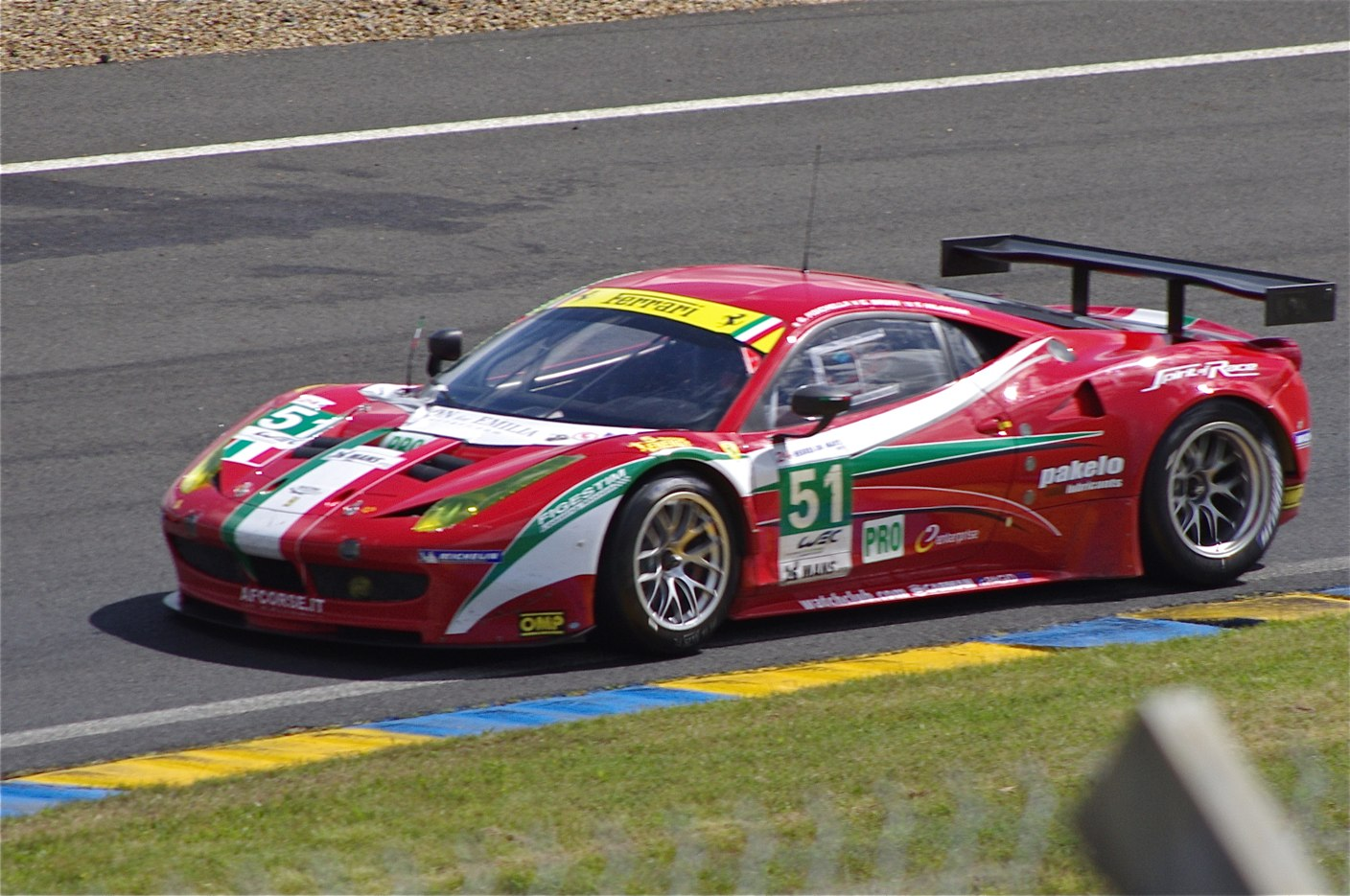
Vilander shared this AF Corse-run Ferrari 458 Italia to win the 2012 24 Hours of Le Mans with Gianmaria Bruni and Giancarlo Fisichella.

Vilander has competed in six Le Mans 24 Hours races from 2008 onwards, driving Ferraris for the AF Corse team. In 2008, he shared a Ferrari 430 with Thomas Biagi and Christian Montanari in the GT2 class but failed to finish. Two years later, he returned to La Sarthe to drive a Ferrari 458 Italia with Jean Alesi and Giancarlo Fisichella, finishing 16th overall and fourth in the GT2 class. In 2011, he again drove a 458 with Fisichella and Gianmaria Bruni in the new GTE-Pro category, improving to 13th overall and second in class having held the class lead for much of the 24 hours. For the 2012 race, the trio returned and won the class convincingly (finishing 17th overall) despite the car having to be completely rebuilt for the race following Fisichella's crash in practice, missing qualifying and starting from the back of the grid as a result. In 2013, he again drove a 458 for AF Corse, this time with Kamui Kobayashi and Olivier Beretta, finishing fifth in the GTE-Pro class. He was reunited with Bruni and Fisichella once more for the 2014 race, and the trio took another class victory.

Vilander made his début in the FIA GT1 World Championship in 2012, again driving a Ferrari 458 Italia for AF Corse alongside Filip Salaquarda. The duo took two victories—one at the Slovakiaring and the other at the Nürburgring—and Vilander finished ninth in the drivers' standings after missing the final round of the season. He did not return to the series in 2013 due to his increased World Endurance Championship commitments for the team.

Vilander has competed in the FIA World Endurance Championship since the series was launched in 2012, having made sporadic appearances in the interim Intercontinental Le Mans Cup series which preceded it. In 2012 he shared a Ferrari 458 Italia with Bruni and Fisichella in AF Corse's lead entry for three of the championship's eight rounds, winning at Le Mans and in Bahrain, assisting the team to win the LMGTE Pro Trophy. For the 2013 season, he was switched to the team's second entry full-time, with Kamui Kobayashi and Olivier Beretta. For the final race in Bahrain, he was swapped with Fisichella in the lead entry due to the latter's disappointing performances, and duly won the class with Bruni to narrowly retain AF Corse's class championship over the works Aston Martin Racing team. With Kobayashi returning to Formula One, Vilander remains with the lead AF Corse team in 2014 with Bruni, and has won the races at Spa-Francorchamps and Le Mans (the latter also with Fisichella) to lead the GTE manufacturers' championship and the newly introduced GTE drivers' championship after three races.

In 2016, Vilander teamed up with Giancarlo Fisichella in WeatherTech SportsCar Championship.

On 5 February 2017, Vilander won the 2017 Liqui Moly Bathurst 12 Hour at the Mount Panorama Circuit in Bathurst, Australia for Australian team Maranello Motorsport driving with multiple Bathurst 1000 winners Craig Lowndes and Jamie Whincup in a Ferrari 488 GT3 to become the second Finnish driver to win the Bathurst 12 Hour after Mika Salo had won the event in 2014. Despite it being his first drive at Bathurst, Vilander impressed when claimed the Allan Simonsen Trophy for pole position and in a brilliant drive also set the fastest lap of the race.

== Racing record ==
=== Racing career summary ===
Season	Series	Team	Races	Wins	Poles	FLaps	Podiums	Points	Position
2002	Formula Renault 2000 Eurocup	RP Motorsport	1	0	0	0	0	0	NC
2002	Formula Renault 2000 Italia	RP Motorsport	9	0	0	0	2	96	5th
2003	Italian Formula Three Championship	RP Motorsport	1	0	1	0	1	16	12th
2003	Formula Renault 2000 Eurocup	RP Motorsport	2	0	0	0	1	20	14th
2003	Formula Renault 2000 Italia	RP Motorsport	12	1	1	1	8	205	3rd
2004	Italian Formula Three Championship	Coloni Motorsport	11	6	7	6	6	146	1st
2004	Formula 3 Euro Series	Coloni Motorsport	4	0	0	0	0	0	26th
2005	Italian Formula 3000 Championship	Team Astromega	5	1	1	1	1	23	4th
2005	Italian Formula 3000 Championship	GP Racing	3	0	0	0	1	23	4th
2005	GP2 Series	Coloni Motorsport	4	0	0	0	0	0	25th
2005	Italian GT Championship - GT2	Playteam Sara Free	16	8	8	5	10	210	**1st**
2006	FIA GT Championship - GT1	Scuderia Playteam	1	0	0	0	0	0	NC
2006	Italian GT Championship - GT1	Scuderia Playteam	16	12	10	12	14	0	**1st**
2006	FIA GT Championship - GT2	AF Corse	1	0	0	0	1	8	17th
2006	American Le Mans Series - GT2	Risi Competizione	3	0	0	0	1	26	27th
2007	FIA GT Championship - GT2	AF Corse Motorola	10	6	0	0	7	73	1st
2008	FIA GT Championship - GT2	AF Corse	11	5	0	0	11	93	1st
2008	24 Hours of Le Mans - GT2	AF Corse	1	0	0	0	0	N/A	DNF
2009	FIA GT Championship - GT2	AF Corse	8	3	0	0	5	54	2nd
2009	Le Mans Series - GT2	Team Modena	1	0	0	0	0	1	25th
2010	Le Mans Series - GT2	AF Corse	5	0	0	1	3	66	2nd
2010	24 Hours of Le Mans - GT2	AF Corse	1	0	0	0	0	N/A	4th
2010	American Le Mans Series - GT2	Risi Competizione	4	0	0	0	1	46	11th
2011	Le Mans Series - LMGTE Pro	AF Corse	5	1	1	0	1	37	4th
2011	24 Hours of Le Mans - LMGTE Pro	AF Corse	1	0	0	0	1	N/A	2nd
2011	American Le Mans Series - GT2	Risi Competizione	8	1	0	0	3	83	6th
2012	FIA GT1 World Championship	AF Corse	16	2	0	0	3	80	9th
2012	FIA World Endurance Championship - LMGTE Pro	AF Corse	2	2	0	0	2	1.5	75th
2012	24 Hours of Le Mans - LMGTE Pro	AF Corse	1	1	0	0	1	N/A	1st
2012	Blancpain Endurance Series - Pro-Am	AF Corse	1	0	0	0	0	13	35th
2012	American Le Mans Series - GT2	Extreme Speed Motorsports	1	1	0	0	1	24	14th
2012	Rolex Sports Car Series - GT	Risi Competizione	1	0	0	0	0	26	76th
2013	FIA World Endurance Championship - LMGTE Pro	AF Corse	8	1	0	1	4	108	5th
2013	24 Hours of Le Mans - LMGTE Pro	AF Corse	1	0	0	0	0	N/A	5th
2013	Blancpain Endurance Series - Pro-Am	AF Corse	1	1	0	0	1	34	12th
2013	Asian Le Mans Series - GTC	Clearwater Racing	1	1	1	0	1	26	8th
2013	Rolex Sports Car Series - GT	R.Ferri/AIM Motorsport Racing with Ferrari	2	0	0	0	0	36	51st
2014	FIA World Endurance Championship - LMGTE Pro	AF Corse	8	4	4	0	5	168	1st
2014	24 Hours of Le Mans - LMGTE Pro	AF Corse	1	1	1	0	1	N/A	1st
2014	British GT Championship - GT3	AF Corse	2	0	0	0	0	6	38th
2014	United SportsCar Championship - GTD	Scuderia Corsa	1	0	0	0	0	22	75th
2015	FIA World Endurance Championship - LMGTE Pro	AF Corse	8	2	3	0	4	131.5	2nd
2015	24 Hours of Le Mans - LMGTE Pro	AF Corse	1	0	0	0	1	N/A	3rd
2015	Blancpain Endurance Series - Pro-Am	AF Corse	1	0	0	0	0	8	24th
2015	United SportsCar Championship - GTLM	AF Corse	1	0	0	0	0	49	20th
2015	United SportsCar Championship - GTLM	Risi Competizione	1	0	0	0	0	49	20th
2015	GT Asia Series - GT3	Clearwater Racing	2	0	0	0	1	25	27th
2016	IMSA SportsCar Championship - GTLM	Risi Competizione	11	1	0	1	2	305	5th
2016	24 Hours of Le Mans - LMGTE Pro	Risi Competizione	1	0	0	0	1	N/A	2nd
2017	FIA World Endurance Championship - LMGTE Pro	AF Corse	1	0	0	0	0	0.5	25th
2017	IMSA SportsCar Championship - GTLM	Risi Competizione	7	0	2	0	5	199	9th
2017	24 Hours of Le Mans - LMGTE Pro	Risi Competizione	1	0	0	0	0	N/A	DNF
2017	Blancpain GT Series Endurance Cup - Pro-Am	BBT	1	0	0	0	0	25	19th
2017	Blancpain GT Series Endurance Cup - Pro-Am	Spirit of Race	1	0	0	0	1	25	19th
2018	IMSA SportsCar Championship - GTLM	Risi Competizione	3	0	0	1	0	74	14th
2018	24 Hours of Le Mans - LMGTE Pro	AF Corse	1	0	0	0	0	N/A	5th
2018	Pirelli World Challenge - GT	R. Ferri Motorsport	19	6	3	3	12	398	1st
2019	IMSA SportsCar Championship - GTD	Scuderia Corsa	11	0	0	2	4	246	5th
2019	24 Hours of Le Mans - LMGTE Am	WeatherTech Racing	1	0	0	0	1	N/A	3rd
2019	Blancpain GT World Challenge America	R. Ferri Motorsport	14	6	3	5	12	274	1st
2019	Blancpain GT Series Endurance Cup - Pro-Am	AF Corse	1	0	0	0	0	3	26th
2020	IMSA SportsCar Championship - GTD	Scuderia Corsa	6	0	0	1	1	119	22nd
2020	24 Hours of Le Mans - LMGTE Pro	WeatherTech Racing	1	0	0	0	0	N/A	DNF
2020	GT World Challenge Europe Endurance Cup - Pro-Am	SMP Racing	1	0	1	0	0	7	20th
2021	FIA World Endurance Championship - LMGTE Am	AF Corse	1	0	0	0	0	0	NC†
2021	Italian GT Championship Sprint - GT3 Pro-Am	AF Corse	8	3	0	0	5	94	**1st**
2022	FIA World Endurance Championship - LMGTE Am	AF Corse	6	0	0	0	0	28	17th
2022	24 Hours of Le Mans - LMGTE Am	AF Corse	1	0	0	0	0	N/A	8th
2022	IMSA SportsCar Championship - GTD	AF Corse	4	0	0	0	1	1119	20th
2024	IMSA SportsCar Championship - GTD	DragonSpeed	1	0	0	0	0	190	67th
2024	IMSA SportsCar Championship - GTD Pro	DragonSpeed	1	0	0	0	0	229	42nd
2024	GT World Challenge America - Pro-Am	AF Corse	1	0	0	0	0	30	17th

=== Complete Formula Renault 2.0 Italia results ===
(key) (Races in bold indicate pole position) (Races in italics indicate fastest lap)

Year	Entrant	1	2	3	4	5	6	7	8	9	10	11	12	DC	Points
2002	RP Motorsport	VLL	PER; 9	PER; 10	SPA; 11	MGI; 2	MNZ; 4	VAR; 7	IMO; 10	MIS; 4	MUG; 2			5th	96
2003	RP Motorsport	**VLL**; **1**; 2	VLL; 2; 26	MGI; 13	SPA; 1; 8	SPA; 2; 8	A1R; 1; 2	A1R; 2; 2	MIS; 1; 1	MIS; 2; 2	VAR; 3	ADR; 2	MNZ; 3	3rd	205

=== Complete Formula Renault 2.0 Eurocup results ===
(key) (Races in bold indicate pole position) (Races in italics indicate fastest lap)

Year	Entrant	1	2	3	4	5	6	7	8	9	DC	Points
2002	RP Motorsport	MAG	SIL	JAR	AND	OSC	SPA	IMO; 29	DON	EST	66th	0
2003	RP Motorsport	BRN; 1	BRN; 2	ASS; 1; 20	ASS; 2; 3	OSC; 1	OSC; 2	DON; 1	DON; 2		14th	20

=== Complete Italian Formula Three Championship results ===
(key) (Races in bold indicate pole position) (Races in italics indicate fastest lap)

Year	Entrant	Chassis	Engine	1	2	3	4	5	6	7	8	9	10	11	12	13	14	DC	Points
2003	RP Motorsport	Dallara F302	Renault	MIS	BIN	MGI	IMO	PER	**MUG**; 2	VAR	MNZ	VLL; DNS						12th	16
2004	Coloni Motorsport	Lola-Dome F106	Spiess-Opel	ADR	MGI	PER	**MUG**; **1**; 1	**MUG**; **2**; 1	**IMO**; **1**; 1	**IMO**; **2**; 1	**VAR**; 1	MNZ; 1 Ret	MNZ; 2; 4	**VLL**; **1** Ret	**VLL**; **2**; 1	MIS; 1 Ret	MIS; 2; 8	1st	146

=== Complete Formula 3 Euro Series results ===
(key) (Races in bold indicate pole position) (Races in italics indicate fastest lap)

Year	Entrant	Chassis	Engine	1	2	3	4	5	6	7	8	9	10	11	12	13	14	15	16	17	18	19	20	DC	Points
2004	Coloni Motorsport	Lola F106/03/009	Mugen	HOC; 1; 15	HOC; 2; 12	EST; 1 Ret	EST; 2; 16	ADR; 1	ADR; 1	PAU; 1	PAU; 2	NOR; 1	NOR; 1	MAG; 1	MAG; 2	NÜR; 1	NÜR; 2	ZAN; 1	ZAN; 2	BRN; 1	BRN; 2	HOC; 1	HOC; 2	26th	0

=== Complete Italian Formula 3000 Championship results ===
(key) (Races in bold indicate pole position) (Races in italics indicate fastest lap)

Year	Entrant	1	2	3	4	5	6	7	8	DC	Points
2005	Team Astromega	**ADR**; Ret	VLL; 1	BRN; Ret	IMO; Ret	MUG; Ret				4th	23
2005	GP Racing						MGI; 2	MNZ; 6	MIS; Ret	4th	23

=== Complete GP2 Series results ===
(key) (Races in bold indicate pole position) (Races in italics indicate fastest lap)

Year	Entrant	1	2	3	4	5	6	7	8	9	10	11	12	13	14	15	16	17	18	19	20	21	22	23	DC	Points
2005	Coloni Motorsport	IMO; FEA	IMO; SPR	CAT; FEA	CAT; SPR	MON; FEA	NÜR; FEA	NÜR; SPR	MAG; FEA	MAG; SPR	SIL; FEA	SIL; SPR	HOC; FEA	HOC; SPR	HUN; FEA	HUN; SPR	IST; FEA	IST; SPR	MNZ; FEA; 15	MNZ; SPR; 8	SPA; FEA; 14	SPA; SPR; 13	BHR; FEA	BHR; SPR	25th	0

=== Complete FIA GT Championship results ===
Year	Entrant	Class	Chassis	1	2	3	4	5	6	7	8	9	10	11	12	13	Rank	Points
2006	Scuderia Playteam	GT1	Maserati MC12 GT1	SIL	BRN	OSC	SPA; 6H	SPA; 12H	SPA; 24H	PRI	DIJ	MUG; Ret	BUD	ADR			NC	0
2006	AF Corse	GT2	Ferrari F430 GTC												DUB; 2		17th	8
2007	AF Corse Motorola	GT2	Ferrari F430 GTC	ZHU; 1	SIL; 1	BUC; 1	MON; 2	OSC; 4	SPA; 6H; Ret	SPA; 12H; Ret	SPA; 24H; Ret	ADR; 1	BRN; 1	NOG; Ret	ZOL; 1		1st	73
2008	AF Corse	GT2	Ferrari F430 GTC	SIL; 1	MON; 2	ADR; 1	OSC; 1	SPA; 6H; 2	SPA; 12H; 3	SPA; 24H; 3	BUC; R1; 2	BUC; R2; 2	BRN; 1	NOG; 3	ZOL; 1	SAN; 2	1st	93
2009	AF Corse	GT2	Ferrari F430 GTC	SIL; 11	ADR; 2	OSC; 1	SPA; 1	BUD; 2	ALG; 6	PAU; 1	ZOL; 4						2nd	54

=== Complete 24 Hours of Spa results ===
Year	Team	Co-Drivers	Car	Class	Laps	Pos.	Class Pos.
2007	(Italy) AF Corse Motorola	(Germany) Dirk Müller (Finland) Mika Salo	Ferrari F430 GT2	GT2	58	DNF	DNF
2008	(Italy) AF Corse	(Italy) Gianmaria Bruni (Brazil) Jaime Melo (Finland) Mika Salo	Ferrari F430 GT2	GT2	550	7th	**3rd**
2009	(Italy) AF Corse	(Italy) Gianmaria Bruni (Argentina) Luís Pérez Companc (Brazil) Jaime Melo	Ferrari F430 GT2	GT2	540	4th	**1st**
2010	(Italy) AF Corse (Germany) ALD Team Vitaphone	(Italy) Gianmaria Bruni (Belgium) Bert Longin (Belgium) Eric van de Poele	Ferrari F430 GTE	GT2	295	DNF	DNF
2012	(Italy) AF Corse	(United Kingdom) Dan Brown (Italy) Giuseppe Cirò (Venezuela) Gaetano Ardagna Pérez	Ferrari 458 Italia GT3	Pro-Am	449	DNF	DNF
2013	(Italy) AF Corse	(United Kingdom) Duncan Cameron (Republic of Ireland) Matt Griffin (United Kingdom) Alex Mortimer	Ferrari 458 Italia GT3	Pro-Am	557	5th	**1st**
2015	(Italy) AF Corse	(Belgium) Adrien de Leener (Italy) Raffaele Giammaria (Monaco) Cédric Sbirrazzuoli	Ferrari 458 Italia GT3	Pro-Am	521	11th	6th
2017	(Switzerland) Spirit of Race	(Lebanon) Alex Demerdjian (France) Nicolas Minassian (Italy) Davide Rizzo	Ferrari 488 GT3	Pro-Am	538	17th	**3rd**
2019	(Italy) AF Corse	(Italy) Andrea Bertolini (Netherlands) Niek Hommerson (Belgium) Louis Machiels	Ferrari 488 GT3	Pro-Am	186	DNF	DNF

=== Complete 24 Hours of Le Mans results ===
Year	Team	Co-Drivers	Car	Class	Laps	Pos.	Class Pos.
2008	(Italy) AF Corse	(Italy) Thomas Biagi (San Marino) Christian Montanari	Ferrari F430 GT2	GT2	111	DNF	DNF
2010	(Italy) AF Corse	(Italy) Giancarlo Fisichella (France) Jean Alesi	Ferrari F430 GT2	GT2	323	16th	4th
2011	(Italy) AF Corse	(Italy) Giancarlo Fisichella (Italy) Gianmaria Bruni	Ferrari 458 Italia GT2	GTE; Pro	314	13th	**2nd**
2012	(Italy) AF Corse	(Italy) Giancarlo Fisichella (Italy) Gianmaria Bruni	Ferrari 458 Italia GT2	GTE; Pro	336	17th	**1st**
2013	(Italy) AF Corse	(Japan) Kamui Kobayashi (Monaco) Olivier Beretta	Ferrari 458 Italia GT2	GTE; Pro	312	20th	5th
2014	(Italy) AF Corse	(Italy) Gianmaria Bruni (Italy) Giancarlo Fisichella	Ferrari 458 Italia GT2	GTE; Pro	339	13th	**1st**
2015	(Italy) AF Corse	(Italy) Gianmaria Bruni (Italy) Giancarlo Fisichella	Ferrari 458 Italia GT2	GTE; Pro	330	25th	**3rd**
2016	(United States) Risi Competizione	(Italy) Giancarlo Fisichella (Italy) Matteo Malucelli	Ferrari 488 GTE	GTE; Pro	340	20th	**2nd**
2017	(United States) Risi Competizione	(Italy) Giancarlo Fisichella (Germany) Pierre Kaffer	Ferrari 488 GTE	GTE; Pro	72	DNF	DNF
2018	(Italy) AF Corse	(Brazil) Pipo Derani (Italy) Antonio Giovinazzi	Ferrari 488 GTE Evo	GTE; Pro	341	20th	5th
2019	(United States) WeatherTech Racing	(United States) Cooper MacNeil (United Kingdom) Robert Smith	Ferrari 488 GTE	GTE; Am	333	33rd	**3rd**
2020	(United States) WeatherTech Racing	(United States) Cooper MacNeil (United States) Jeff Segal	Ferrari 488 GTE Evo	GTE; Pro	185	DNF	DNF
2022	(Italy) AF Corse	(United States) Simon Mann (Switzerland) Christoph Ulrich	Ferrari 488 GTE Evo	GTE; Am	339	41st	8th

=== Complete GT1 World Championship results ===
Year	Team	Car	1	2	3	4	5	6	7	8	9	10	11	12	13	14	15	16	17	18	Pos	Points
2012	AF Corse	Ferrari	NOG; QR; 5	NOG; CR; 6	ZOL; QR; 13	ZOL; CR; 3	NAV; QR; 10	NAV; QR; 9	SVK; QR; 1	SVK; CR; 4	ALG; QR; 12	ALG; CR; Ret	SVK; QR; 7	SVK; CR; 6	MOS; QR; 9	MOS; CR; Ret	NUR; QR; 8	NUR; CR; 1	DON; QR	DON; CR	9th	80

=== Complete FIA World Endurance Championship results ===
(key) (Races in bold indicate pole position; races in italics indicate fastest lap)

Year	Entrant	Class	Chassis	Engine	1	2	3	4	5	6	7	8	9	Rank	Points
2012	AF Corse	LMGTE Pro	Ferrari 458 Italia GT2	Ferrari 4.5L V8	SEB; EX	SPA	LMS; 1	SIL	SÃO	BHR; 1	FUJ	SHA		75th	1.5
2013	AF Corse	LMGTE Pro	Ferrari 458 Italia GT2	Ferrari 4.5L V8	SIL; 2	SPA; 3	LMS; 4	SÃO; Ret	COA; 3	FUJ; 9	SHA; 5	BHR; 1		5th	108
2014	AF Corse	LMGTE Pro	Ferrari 458 Italia GT2	Ferrari 4.5 L V8	**SIL**; 4	**SPA**; 1	**LMS**; 1	**COA**; 3	FUJ; 1	SHA; Ret	BHR; 1	SÃO; 4		**1st**	**168**
2015	AF Corse	LMGTE Pro	Ferrari 458 Italia GT2	Ferrari 4.5 L V8	SIL; 1	SPA; 4	LMS; 4	**NÜR**; 14	COA; 7	FUJ; 1	**SHA**; 2	**BHR**; 2		2nd	131.5
2017	AF Corse	LMGTE Pro	Ferrari 488 GTE	Ferrari F154CB 3.9 L Turbo V8	SIL	SPA	LMS	NÜR; 11	MEX	COA	FUJ	SHA	BHR	25th	0.5
2021	AF Corse	LMGTE Am	Ferrari 488 GTE Evo	Ferrari F154CB 3.9 L Turbo V8	SPA	ALG	MNZ; 10	LMS	BHR	BHR				NC‡	0
2022	AF Corse	LMGTE Am	Ferrari 488 GTE Evo	Ferrari F154CB 3.9 L Turbo V8	SEB; 7	SPA; 11	LMS; 7	MNZ; 7	FUJ; 10	BHR; 11				17th	28

‡ As Vilander was a guest driver, he was ineligible for points.

=== Complete IMSA SportsCar Championship results ===
(key) (Races in bold indicate pole position; results in italics indicate fastest lap)

Year	Team	No.	Class	Make	Engine	1	2	3	4	5	6	7	8	9	10	11	12	Pos.	Points
2014	Scuderia Corsa	63	GTD	Ferrari 458 Italia GT3	Ferrari F136 4.5 L V8	DAY; 11	SEB	LGA	DET	WGL	MOS	IND	ELK	VIR	COA	PET		75th	22
2015	AF Corse	51	GTLM	Ferrari 458 Italia GT2	Ferrari F136 4.5 L V8	DAY; 10	SEB	LBH	LGA	WGL	MOS	ELK	VIR	COA				20th	49
2015	Risi Competizione	62	GTLM	Ferrari 458 Italia GT2	Ferrari F136 4.5 L V8										PET; 5			20th	49
2016	Risi Competizione	62	GTLM	Ferrari 488 GTE	Ferrari F154CB 3.9 L Turbo V8	DAY; 6	SEB; 4	LBH; 3	LGA; 5	WGL; 6	MOS; 7	LIM; 4	ELK; 5	VIR; 7	COA; 8	PET; 1		5th	305
2017	Risi Competizione	62	GTLM	Ferrari 488 GTE	Ferrari F154CB 3.9 L Turbo V8	DAY; 3	SEB; 3	LBH; 9	COA; 9	WGL	MOS	LIM	ELK	VIR; 3	**LGA**; 2	**PET**; 3		9th	199
2018	Risi Competizione	62	GTLM	Ferrari 488 GTE	Ferrari F154CB 3.9 L Turbo V8	DAY; 5	SEB; 5	LBH	MDO	WGL	MOS	LIM	ELK	VIR	LGA	PET; 9		14th	74
2019	Scuderia Corsa	63	GTD	Ferrari 488 GT3	Ferrari F154CB 3.9 L Turbo V8	DAY; 23	SEB; 3	MDO; 7	DET; 12	WGL; 3	MOS; 9	LIM; 11	ELK; 7	VIR; 3	LGA; 2	PET; 5		5th	246
2020	Scuderia Corsa	63	GTD	Ferrari 488 GT3	Ferrari F154CB 3.9 L Turbo V8	DAY; 7	DAY; 5	SEB; 2	ELK; 4	VIR; 13	ATL; 9	MDO	CLT	PET	LGA	SEB		22nd	119
2022	AF Corse	21	GTD	Ferrari 488 GT3 Evo 2020	Ferrari F154CB 3.9 L Turbo V8	DAY; 4	SEB; 3	LBH	LGA	MDO	DET	WGL; 8	MOS	LIM	ELK	VIR	PET; 8	20th	1119
2024	DragonSpeed	56	GTD	Ferrari 296 GT3	Ferrari F163CE 3.0 L Turbo V6	DAY	SEB	LBH	LGA		WGL	MOS	ELK	VIR	IMS; 13			67th	190
2024	DragonSpeed	82	GTD Pro	Ferrari 296 GT3	Ferrari F163CE 3.0 L Turbo V6					DET						PET; 10		42nd	229

=== Complete Bathurst 12 Hour results ===
Year	No.	Team	Co-Drivers	Car	Class	Laps	Pos.	Class Pos.
2017	88	(Australia) Maranello Motorsport	(Australia) Jamie Whincup (Australia) Craig Lowndes	Ferrari 488 GT3	AP	290	1st	1st

Sporting positions
Preceded by Roberto Streit	Italian Formula Renault 2.0 Winter Series; Champion; 2002	Succeeded by Pastor Maldonado
Preceded by Miguel Ramos; Matteo Malucelli	Italian GT Championship; Champion; 2006	Succeeded by Stefano Livio; Lorenzo Casè
Preceded by Gianmaria Bruni	FIA World Endurance Cup for GT Drivers; 2014; With: Gianmaria Bruni	Succeeded by Richard Lietz
Preceded by Álvaro Parente; Shane van Gisbergen; Jonathon Webb	Winner of the Bathurst 12 Hour; 2017; With: Craig Lowndes & Jamie Whincup	Succeeded by Robin Frijns; Stuart Leonard; Dries Vanthoor
Preceded by Michael Cooper; Jordan Taylor	SprintX GT Championship Series champion 2018; With: Miguel Molina	Succeeded by Incumbent
