= 2014 Italian GT Championship =

Seasons
- ← 2013 2015 →

The 2014 Italian GT Championship was the 23rd season of the Italian GT Championship, the grand tourer-style sports car racing founded by the Italian automobile club (Automobile Club d'Italia). The season started on 11 May at Misano and ended on 26 October at Monza after seven double-header meetings.

The drivers' championship was won by Scuderia Baldini 27 Network drivers Lorenzo Casè and Raffaele Giammaria, finishing just three points of their nearest rivals, Marco Mapelli and Thomas Schoeffler. A further fifteen points behind in third place were MP1 Corse's Nicola Benucci. While GTC category was won by Massimo Omar Galbiatil.

== Race calendar and results ==
Round		Circuit	Date	Pole position	GT3 winner	GTC winner
1	R1	(Italy) Misano World Circuit Marco Simoncelli, Misano Adriatico	11 May	(San Marino) No. 6 Audi Sport Italia	(San Marino) No. 5 Audi Sport Italia	(Italy) No. 122 Kripton Motorsport
1	R1	(Italy) Misano World Circuit Marco Simoncelli, Misano Adriatico	11 May	(Italy) Marco Mapelli	(Italy) Dindo Capello (San Marino) Emanuele Zonzini	(Italy) Fabrizio Bignotti
1	R2	(Italy) Misano World Circuit Marco Simoncelli, Misano Adriatico	11 May	(Italy) No. 77 BMS Scuderia Italia	(San Marino) No. 6 Audi Sport Italia	(Italy) No. 132 Antonelli Motorsport
1	R2	(Italy) Misano World Circuit Marco Simoncelli, Misano Adriatico	11 May	(Italy) Alessandro Pier Guidi	(Italy) Marco Mapelli (Germany) Thomas Schöffler	(Italy) Massimo Omar Galbiati (Italy) Christian Passuti
2	R1	(Italy) Autodromo Nazionale Monza, Monza	1 June	(Italy) No. 63 Imperiale Racing	(Italy) No. 23 Team Malucelli	(Italy) No. 116 Master Service
2	R1	(Italy) Autodromo Nazionale Monza, Monza	1 June	(Italy) Giacomo Barri	(Italy) Alex Frassineti (Italy) Piero Necchi	(Italy) Daniel Mancinelli (Colombia) Steven Goldstein
2	R2	(Italy) Autodromo Nazionale Monza, Monza	1 June	(San Marino) No. 5 Audi Sport Italia	(Italy) No. 44 Ebimotors	(Italy) No. 134 Tempesta Sascha
2	R2	(Italy) Autodromo Nazionale Monza, Monza	1 June	(San Marino) Emanuele Zonzini	(Italy) Vincenzo Donativi (Italy) Andrea Gagliardini	(Italy) Simone Iacone (Italy) Sascha Tempesta
3	R1	(Italy) Mugello Circuit	13 July	(Italy) No. 27 Scuderia Baldini 27 Network	(San Marino) No. 6 Audi Sport Italia	(Italy) No. 134 Tempesta Sascha
3	R1	(Italy) Mugello Circuit	13 July	(Italy) Lorenzo Casè	(Italy) Marco Mapelli (Germany) Thomas Schöffler	(Italy) Simone Iacone (Italy) Sascha Tempesta
3	R2	(Italy) Mugello Circuit	13 July	(San Marino) No. 6 Audi Sport Italia	(Italy) No. 77 BMS Scuderia Italia	(Italy) No. 132 Antonelli Motorsport
3	R2	(Italy) Mugello Circuit	13 July	(Italy) Marco Mapelli	(Italy) Luigi Lucchini (Italy) Alessandro Pier Guidi	(Italy) Massimo Omar Galbiati (Italy) Luca Rangoni
4	R1	(France) Circuit Paul Ricard, Le Castellet	31 August	(Italy) No. 27 Scuderia Baldini 27 Network	(Italy) No. 63 Imperiale Racing	(Italy) No. 134 Tempesta Sascha
4	R1	(France) Circuit Paul Ricard, Le Castellet	31 August	(Italy) Raffaele Giammaria	(Italy) Giacomo Barri (Italy) Mirko Bortolotti	(Italy) Simone Iacone (Italy) Sascha Tempesta
4	R2	(France) Circuit Paul Ricard, Le Castellet	31 August	(San Marino) No. 6 Audi Sport Italia	(Italy) No. 9 MP1 Corse	(Italy) No. 103 Antonelli Motorsport
4	R2	(France) Circuit Paul Ricard, Le Castellet	31 August	(Italy) Marco Mapelli	(Italy) Alessandro Balzan (Italy) Nicola Benucci	(Italy) Pierluigi Alessandri (Argentina) Juan Pipkin
5	R1	(Italy) ACI Vallelunga Circuit, Campagnano di Roma	14 September	(Italy) No. 27 Scuderia Baldini 27 Network	(Italy) No. 63 Imperiale Racing	(Italy) No. 116 Master Service
5	R1	(Italy) ACI Vallelunga Circuit, Campagnano di Roma	14 September	(Italy) Raffaele Giammaria	(Italy) Giacomo Barri (Italy) Mirko Bortolotti	(Italy) Daniel Mancinelli (Colombia) Steven Goldstein
5	R2	(Italy) ACI Vallelunga Circuit, Campagnano di Roma	14 September	(Italy) No. 63 Imperiale Racing	(Italy) No. 9 MP1 Corse	(Italy) No. 116 Master Service
5	R2	(Italy) ACI Vallelunga Circuit, Campagnano di Roma	14 September	(Italy) Mirko Bortolotti	(Italy) Alessandro Balzan (Italy) Nicola Benucci	(Italy) Daniel Mancinelli (Colombia) Steven Goldstein
6	R1	(Italy) Autodromo Enzo e Dino Ferrari, Imola	12 October	(Italy) No. 9 MP1 Corse	(Italy) No. 8 Easy Race	(Italy) No. 112 Ebimotors
6	R1	(Italy) Autodromo Enzo e Dino Ferrari, Imola	12 October	(Italy) Alessandro Balzan	(Italy) Luigi Ferrara (Italy) Marco Magli	(Italy) Tommaso Maino (Italy) Ronnie Valori
6	R2	(Italy) Autodromo Enzo e Dino Ferrari, Imola	12 October	(Italy) No. 63 Imperiale Racing	(Italy) No. 27 Scuderia Baldini 27 Network	(Italy) No. 103 Antonelli Motorsport
6	R2	(Italy) Autodromo Enzo e Dino Ferrari, Imola	12 October	(Italy) Mirko Bortolotti	(Italy) Lorenzo Casè (Italy) Raffaele Giammaria	(Italy) Valentino Fornapolli
7	R1	(Italy) Autodromo Nazionale Monza, Monza	26 October	(Italy) No. 9 MP1 Corse	(Italy) No. 14 Ombra Racing	(Italy) No. 132 Antonelli Motorsport
7	R1	(Italy) Autodromo Nazionale Monza, Monza	26 October	(Italy) Alessandro Balzan	(Italy) Alex Frassineti (Italy) Stefano Costantini	(Italy) Massimo Omar Galbiati (Italy) Christian Passuti
7	R2	(Italy) Autodromo Nazionale Monza, Monza	26 October	(Italy) No. 63 Imperiale Racing	(Switzerland) No. 12 Solaris Motorsport	(Italy) No. 116 Master Service
7	R2	(Italy) Autodromo Nazionale Monza, Monza	26 October	(Italy) Mirko Bortolotti	(Italy) Francesco Sini (Czech Republic) Tomáš Enge	(Italy) Daniel Mancinelli (Colombia) Steven Goldstein

== Standings ==
=== Drivers' championship ===
==== GT3 ====
Pos	Driver	MIS (Italy)		MNZ (Italy)		MUG (Italy)		LEC (France)		VLL (Italy)		IMO (Italy)		MNZ (Italy)		Points
GT3
1	(Italy) Lorenzo Casè (Italy) Raffaele Giammaria	4	Ret	3	Ret	**2**	2	**2**	4	**3**	6	10	1	6	2	131
3	(Italy) Marco Mapelli (Germany) Thomas Schöffler	8	1	6	8	1	4	5	2	8	Ret	3	2	4	3	128
5	(Italy) Nicola Benucci	3	4	4	Ret	8	7	13	1	7	1	2	7	3	8	113
6	(Italy) Alessandro Balzan	3	4					13	1	7	1	**2**	7	**3**	8	98
7	(Italy) Luigi Ferrara (Italy) Marco Magli	6	8	5	4	3	9	6	9	9	5	1	6	7	5	85
9	(Italy) Gianluca Carboni (Italy) Matteo Beretta	24	7	2	2	5	6	11	5	4	4	5	Ret	Ret	4	85
10	(Italy) Luigi Lucchini	2	9			Ret	1	3	6	2	8	23	3			84
11	(Italy) Alex Frassineti	Ret	20	1	7	4	8			6	3	Ret	5	1	Ret	79
12	(Italy) Vincenzo Donativi (Italy) Andrea Gagliardini	23	2	9	1	6	5	8	7	10	7	6	Ret	9	6	73
14	(Italy) Rinaldo Capello (San Marino) Emanuele Zonzini	1	Ret	17	**6**	20	Ret	4	Ret	5	2	7	14	8	7	69
15	(Italy) Giacomo Barri	13	3	**19**	9	Ret	Ret	1	3	1	13	Ret	Ret	10	Ret	68
16	(Italy) Alessandro Pier Guidi	2	**9**			Ret	1	3	6			23	3			66
17	(Italy) Mirko Bortolotti							1	3	1	**13**	Ret	**Ret**	10	**Ret**	54
18	(Italy) Riccardo Bianco	7	5	18	3	Ret	11	7	8			22	4			38
19	(Italy) Piero Necchi			1	7	4	8									35
20	(Italy) Stefano Pezzucchi	10	Ret			Ret	11	7	8			22	4	2	Ret	31
21	(Italy) Francesco Sini (Czech Republic) Tomáš Enge													5	1	27
22	(Italy) Fabio Babini	7	5	18	3											23
23	(Portugal) Francisco Mora	5	6	Ret	18	21	10					4	DSQ			22
24	(Italy) Gabriele Lancieri			4	Ret	8	7					Ret	5			22
25	Stefano Costantini													1	Ret	20
26	(Italy) Matteo Malucelli	9	19							6	3					19
27	(United States) Jeff Segal									2	8					18
28	(Germany) René Bordeaux (Germany) Robert Renauer					7	3									16
30	(Italy) Andrea Amici	13	3	19	9	Ret	Ret									14
31	(Italy) Lorenzo Bontempelli (Italy) Beniamino Caccia			7	5											11
33	(Italy) Emanuele Romani			Ret	Ret	10	12	9	17	Ret	9	8	Ret	11	Ret	9
34	(San Marino) Marco Galassi	9	19									9	8			7
35	(Italy) Roberto Benedetti (Italy) Kevin d'Amico	11	10	8	Ret	9	18									6
37	(Italy) Mauro Trentin											9	8			5
38	(Italy) Stefano Sala											8	Ret	12	Ret	3
39	(Italy) Giovanni Berton							9	17							3
40	(Greece) Dimitri Deverikos									Ret	9					2
41	(Angola) Luís Sá Silva			Ret	18	21	10									2
42	(Italy) Manuele Mengozzi					10	12									1
	(Italy) Giovanna Amati (Italy) Giovanni di Lorenzi	12	11													0
	(Italy) Dario Cerati (Italy) Stefano Garelli											11	Ret			0
	(Portugal) António Coimbra (Portugal) Luís Silva											Ret	DNS	19	DNS	0
	(Spain) Álvaro Barba	Ret	20													0
	(Portugal) Patrick Cunha (Portugal) "Geronimo"													20	Ret	0
Pos	Driver	MIS (Italy)		MNZ (Italy)		MUG (Italy)		LEC (France)		VLL (Italy)		IMO (Italy)		MNZ (Italy)		Points

Colour	Result
Gold	Winner
Silver	Second place
Bronze	Third place
Green	Points classification
Blue	Non-points classification
Blue	Non-classified finish (NC)
Purple	Retired, not classified (Ret)
Red	Did not qualify (DNQ)
Red	Did not pre-qualify (DNPQ)
Black	Disqualified (DSQ)
White	Did not start (DNS)
White	Withdrew (WD)
White	Race cancelled (C)
Blank	Did not practice (DNP)
Blank	Did not arrive (DNA)
Blank	Excluded (EX)

**Bold** – Pole
Italics – Fastest Lap

==== GTC ====
Pos	Driver	MIS (Italy)		MNZ (Italy)		MUG (Italy)		LEC (France)		VLL (Italy)		IMO (Italy)		MNZ (Italy)		Points
1	(Italy) Omar Galbiati	15	12	15	11	17	13	17	12	12	14	13	12	12	12	161
2	(Italy) Simone Iacone (Italy) Sascha Tempesta			11	10	11	15	10	14	13	11	20	10	15	14	151
4	(Italy) Christian Passuti	15	12	15	11			17	12	12	14	13	12	12	12	146
5	(Italy) Daniel Mancinelli (Colombia) Steven Goldstein			10	13	18	17	14	11	11	10	17	Ret	14	9	142
7	(Italy) "El Pato"	17	14	Ret	19	12	14	12	16	15	12					91
8	(Italy) Alessandro Baccani (Italy) Paolo Venerosi	19	17	13	12	13	21	15	15	16	15	15	Ret	17	13	90
10	(Italy) Giuseppe Bodega	20	16	12	14	15	20	18	13	17	16	16	Ret	Ret	10	84
11	(Italy) Stefano Maestri	20	16	12	14	15	20			17	16	16	Ret	Ret	10	74
12	(Italy) Mirko Zanardini			Ret	19	12	14	12	16	15	12					71
13	(Italy) Pierluigi Alessandri	16	13	Ret	Ret	Ret	19	16	10	15	17					70
14	(Italy) Tommaso Maino (Italy) Ronnie Valori											12	11	16	11	51
16	(Italy) Davide Durante (Italy) Nicolò Piancastelli											14	13	13	15	38
18	(Argentina) Juan Pipkin							16	10					18	16	34
19	(Italy) Marco Macori	16	13													27
20	(Italy) Enrico Quinzio (Italy) Domenico Schiattarella	18	21	16	16	14	23									27
22	(Italy) Livio Selva			14	15	16	16									22
23	(Italy) Fabrizio Bignotti	14	18	Ret	Ret											24
24	(Italy) Luca Rangoni					17	13									24
25	(Italy) "Spezz"	21	15	Ret	Ret	16	16	Ret	Ret							24
26	(Italy) Valentino Fornaroli											21	9			21
27	(Ecuador) Sebastián Merchán	17	14													20
28	(Italy) Marco Panzavuota							18	13							12
29	(Italy) Daniel Zampieri									15	17					11
30	(Italy) Luca Pastorelli			Ret	17							19	15	Ret	Ret	11
31	(Italy) Nicola Pastorelli											19	15			8
32	(Italy) Andrea Quaglia			Ret	17	19	22									7
33	(Italy) Matteo Macchiavelli													18	16	7
34	(Italy) Stefano Sala					Ret	19									5
35	(Italy) Roberto Delli Guanti (South Africa) David Perel											18	Ret			4
37	(Italy) Domenico Zonin					19	22									0
38	(Italy) Emanuele Romani	22	Ret													2
	(Italy) Alberto Caneva													Ret	Ret	0
GTC2
	(Italy) Gianni Giudici							19	Ret							0
Pos	Driver	MIS (Italy)		MNZ (Italy)		MUG (Italy)		LEC (France)		VLL (Italy)		IMO (Italy)		MNZ (Italy)		Points
