= 2006 FIA GT3 European Championship =

Seasons
- ← none 2007 →

The 2006 FIA GT3 European Championship season was the inaugural season of the FIA GT3 European Championship. The season began on May 2, 2006, and ended on September 17, 2006, and featured ten one-hour races over five rounds.

== Schedule ==
All races were one hour in length, and served as support races for the FIA GT Championship.

Rnd	Event	Circuit	Date
1	(United Kingdom) Silverstone Supercar Showdown	Silverstone Circuit	May 6
2	(United Kingdom) Silverstone Supercar Showdown	Silverstone Circuit	May 7
3	(Germany) Oschersleben Supercar 500	Motorsport Arena Oschersleben	July 1
4	(Germany) Oschersleben Supercar 500	Motorsport Arena Oschersleben	July 2
5	(Belgium) Proximus Spa 24 Hours	Circuit de Spa-Francorchamps	July 28
6	(Belgium) Proximus Spa 24 Hours	Circuit de Spa-Francorchamps	July 29
7	(France) Dijon Supercar 500	Dijon-Prenois	September 2
8	(France) Dijon Supercar 500	Dijon-Prenois	September 3
9	(Italy) Mugello Supercar 500	Mugello Circuit	September 16
10	(Italy) Mugello Supercar 500	Mugello Circuit	September 17

== Season results ==
Rnd	Circuit	Race 1 Winning Team	Race 2 Winning Team
Rnd	Circuit	Race 1 Winning Drivers	Race 2 Winning Drivers
1 2	Silverstone	(Monaco) #34 JMB Racing	(Italy) #38 GPC Sport
1 2	Silverstone	(Denmark) Allan Simonsen (Republic of Ireland) Hector Lester	(Italy) Giuseppe Arlotti (Italy) Paolo Cutrera
3 4	Oschersleben	(Italy) #27 Racing Box	(Italy) #23 BMS Scuderia Italia
3 4	Oschersleben	(Italy) Andrea Ceccato (Italy) Stefano Livio	(Italy) Marcello Zani (Italy) Massimiliano Mugelli
5 6	Spa	(France) #10 Racing Logistic	(France) #10 Racing Logistic
5 6	Spa	(Belgium) Frédéric Bouvy (France) Patrick Bornhauser	(Belgium) Frédéric Bouvy (France) Patrick Bornhauser
7 8	Dijon	(France) #10 Racing Logistic	(United Kingdom) #9 Tech 9 Motosport
7 8	Dijon	(France) Jean-Luc Blanchemain (France) Patrick Bornhauser	(United Kingdom) Phil Keen (United Kingdom) Sean Edwards
9 10	Mugello	(United Kingdom) #9 Tech 9 Motosport	(United Kingdom) #9 Tech 9 Motosport
9 10	Mugello	(United Kingdom) Phil Keen (United Kingdom) Sean Edwards	(United Kingdom) Phil Keen (United Kingdom) Sean Edwards

== Championships ==
=== Teams Championship ===
Pos	Team	Car	Engine	Rd 1	Rd 2	Rd 3	Rd 4	Rd 5	Rd 6	Rd 7	Rd 8	Rd 9	Rd 10	Total
1	(United Kingdom) Tech 9 Motosport	Porsche 997 GT3 Cup	Porsche M97/76 3.6 L Flat-6	12	2			8	9	3	11	12	12	69
2	(France) Racing Logistic	Dodge Viper Competition Coupe	Dodge Viper 8.3 L V10		7	5	3	10	16	14	6	1	5	67
3	(Italy) Racing Box	Dodge Viper Competition Coupe	Dodge Viper 8.3 L V10	5	14	10	9	4	4			6	4	56
4	(Italy) BMS Scuderia Italia	Aston Martin DBRS9	Aston Martin AM04 6.0 L V12				18	5	5	8	8	5	3	53
5	(United Kingdom) Damax	Ascari KZ1-R	BMW S62 5.0 L V8	6	5							11	9	31
6	(France) Riverside	Corvette Z06.R GT3	Chevrolet LS7 7.0 L V8			8	6		6	9				29
7	(Monaco) JMB Racing Ferrari	Ferrari F430 GT3	Ferrari F136 4.3 L V8	10	11		4		2					28
8	(Germany) Reiter Engineering	Lamborghini Gallardo GT3	Lamborghini 5.0 L V10	5						5	3		6	14
9	(France) Pouchelon Racing	Dodge Viper Competition Coupe	Dodge Viper 8.3 L V10			8	3			1				12
10	(France) Auto Sport Promotion	Porsche 997 GT3 Cup	Porsche M97/76 3.6 L Flat-6	4					2			4		10
11	(Netherlands) Team Carsport Callaway	Corvette Z06.R GT3	Chevrolet LS7 7.0 L V8					8						8
12=	(United Kingdom) Barwell Motorsport	Aston Martin DBRS9	Aston Martin AM04 6.0 L V12	2					3					5
12=	(Italy) AF Corse	Maserati Gran Sport Light	Maserati F136 4.2 L V8			3					2			5

=== Drivers Championship ===
Points are awarded to the top eight finishers in the order 10-8-6-5-4-3-2-1

Pos	Driver	Team	Rd 1	Rd 2	Rd 3	Rd 4	Rd 5	Rd 6	Rd 7	Rd 8	Rd 9	Rd 10	Total
1	(United Kingdom) Sean Edwards	(United Kingdom) Tech 9 Motorsport	8	8			8	8		10	10	10	54
2	(France) Patrick Bornhauser	(France) Racing Logistic			4	2	10	10	10	6	1	5	48
3=	(Italy) Stefano Livio	(Italy) Racing Box		10	10	4			8	5	6		43
3=	(Italy) Andrea Ceccato	(Italy) Racing Box		10	10	4			8	5	6		43
5	(United Kingdom) Phil Keen	(United Kingdom) Tech 9 Motorsport								10	10	10	30
6=	(Switzerland) Toni Seiler	(Italy) BMS Scuderia Italia				8		5	5	8			26
6=	(Italy) Franco Groppi	(Italy) BMS Scuderia Italia				8		5	5	8			26
8	(Greece) Dimitris Deverikos	(United Kingdom) Tech 9 Motorsport	8				8	8					24
9=	(Italy) Marcello Zani	(Italy) BMS Scuderia Italia				10	5				5	3	23
9=	(Italy) Massimiliano Mugelli	(Italy) BMS Scuderia Italia				10	5				5	3	23
11	(France) Jean-Luc Blanchemain	(France) Racing Logistic			4	2			10	6			22
12=	(Italy) Stefano Zonca	(Italy) Racing Box	5	4		5			3			4	21
12=	(Italy) Marco Cioci	(Italy) Racing Box	5	4		5			3			4	21
14	(Belgium) Frédéric Bouvy	(France) Racing Logistic					10	10					20
15=	(Denmark) Allan Simonsen	(Monaco) JMB Racing	10	8			1						19
15=	(Republic of Ireland) Hector Lester	(Monaco) JMB Racing	10	8			1						19
15=	(France) James Ruffier	(France) Riverside			6	6			4	3			19
15=	(United Kingdom) Andrew Thompson	(United Kingdom) Damax			3						8	8	19
19	(United Kingdom) Matt Allison	(United Kingdom) Damax									8	8	16
20=	(Switzerland) Steve Zacchia	(France) Racing Logistic		6		1		6	1				14
20=	(France) Olivier Dupard	(France) Racing Logistic		6		1		6	1				14
22=	(United Kingdom) Leo Machitski	(United Kingdom) Barwell Motorsport						3	6	4			13
22=	(United Kingdom) Jonathan Cocker	(United Kingdom) Barwell Motorsport						3	6	4			13
24	(France) Thierry Rabineau	(France) Riverside			6	6							12
25=	(France) Gilles Duqueisne	(France) Pouchelon Racing	3		8								11
25=	(United Kingdom) Anthony Reid	(France) Pouchelon Racing	3		8								11
25=	(United States) Tom Heinricy	(Netherlands) Team Carsport Callaway			5		6						11
28=	(France) Morgan Moulin-Traffort	(France) Auto Sport Promotion	4					2			4		10
28=	(France) Marc Cattaneo	(France) Auto Sport Promotion	4					2			4		10
30=	(United Kingdom) Ben Collins	(United Kingdom) Damax	6								3		9
30=	(Netherlands) Paul van Splunteren	(United Kingdom) Tech 9 Motorsport	2	2				1			2	2	9
32=	(Italy) Leonardo Maddalena	(Italy) Racing Box					4	4					8
32=	(Italy) Bruno Corradi	(Italy) Racing Box					4	4					8
34=	(France) François Xavier Terny	(France) Riverside							4	3			7
34=	(United Kingdom) Aaron Scott	(United Kingdom) Damax	6									1	7
36=	(Italy) Luciano Linossi	(Germany) Reiter Engineering										6	6
36=	(Italy) Lorenzo Bontempelli	(Germany) Reiter Engineering										6	6
36=	(United Kingdom) Ian Khan	(Monaco) JMB Racing		3			3						6
36=	(United States) Stephen Earle	(Monaco) JMB Racing		3			3						6
36=	(Germany) Jürgen von Gartzen	(Netherlands) Team Carsport Callaway					6						6
36=	(France) Frédéric Makowiecki	(France) Racing Logistic									1	5	6
36=	(United Kingdom) Stuart Turvey	(United Kingdom) Damax		5								1	6
43=	(Germany) Uli Berberich-Martini	(Netherlands) Team Carsport Callaway			5								5
43=	(Italy) Luca Pirri	(Netherlands) Team Carsport Callaway		5									5
43=	(Republic of Ireland) James Murphy	(United Kingdom) Tech 9 Motorsport	2	2				1					5
46	(United Kingdom) Andrew Purdie	(United Kingdom) Tech 9 Motorsport									2	2	4
47=	(Germany) Wido Rossler	(France) Pouchelon Racing				3							3
47=	(France) David Hallyday	(France) Pouchelon Racing				3							3
47=	(Germany) Albert von Thurn und Taxis	(Germany) Reiter Engineering							2	1			3
47=	(Netherlands) Phil Bastiaans	(Germany) Reiter Engineering							2	1			3
47=	(United Kingdom) Nick Adams	(United Kingdom) Damax			3								3
47=	(Netherlands) Klaas Zwart	(United Kingdom) Damax									3		3
53=	(Brazil) Paulo Bonifácio	(Netherlands) Team Carsport Callaway						2					2
53=	(Italy) Marco Panzavuota	(Netherlands) Team Carsport Callaway						2					2
53=	(Italy) Alberto Cerrai	(Italy) AF Corse			2								2
53=	(Italy) Diego Alessi	(Italy) AF Corse			2								2
53=	(France) Christopher Campbell	(France) Riverside								2			2
53=	(France) Philippe Charriol	(France) Riverside								2			2
53=	(Czech Republic) Jaromir Jirik	(Austria) S-Berg Racing		1	1								2
60=	(United Kingdom) Martin Rich	(United Kingdom) Barwell Motorsport	1										1
60=	(United Kingdom) Piers Johnson	(United Kingdom) Barwell Motorsport	1										1
60=	(Germany) Marc Basseng	(Austria) S-Berg Racing				1							1
60=	(Netherlands) Dennis Retera	(Germany) Reiter Engineering			1								1

== Bibliography ==
- Loisy, Olivier (2006). FIA GT & GT3 European Championship 2006 Yearbook. Paris: Apollo Publishing. ISBN 978-2952104449.
