= 2009 FIA GT3 European Championship =

Seasons
- ← 2008 2010 →

The 2009 FIA GT3 European Championship season was the fourth season of the FIA GT3 European Championship. The season began on 2 May at Silverstone and ended on 14 November 2009 at Zolder. The season featured six double-header rounds, with each race lasting for a duration of 60 minutes. Most of the events were support races to the 2009 FIA GT Championship season, the 2009 GT4 European Cup and the 2009 Lamborghini Super Trofeo.

Phoenix Racing pairing Christopher Haase and Christopher Mies claimed the overall title, with a fourth place in the final race of the season at Zolder. In the Teams Championship, Hexis Racing were champions ahead of Matech Racing and Team Rosberg.

== Entries and drivers ==
Two new manufacturers join the FIA GT3 category in 2009. Audi, with their V10-powered R8 LMS, and Alpina's B6, based on the 6-Series. The Ford Mustang FR500GT3 does not return in 2009. Ferrari replaces its previous F430 GT3 with the new 430 Scuderia GT3, while Morgan's Aero 8 is replaced by the Aero Super Sport.

Also new for 2009 is an alteration in the structure of teams and manufacturers. Although manufacturers will still be allowed a maximum of six cars, teams are only limited to two cars. There is therefore a maximum of three teams which can campaign a single manufacturer. The manufacturers of Ascari, Dodge, Jaguar, Lamborghini, and Morgan will not be eligible for the Manufacturers Cup due to not supplying the minimum of four cars required to enter the Cup.

Team	Chassis	Engine	No.	Drivers	Rounds	Tyres
(Switzerland) Matech GT Racing	Ford GT GT3	Ford Cammer 5.0 L V8	1	(Brazil) Walter Salles	All	M
(Switzerland) Matech GT Racing	Ford GT GT3	Ford Cammer 5.0 L V8	1	(Germany) Thomas Mutsch	All	M
(Switzerland) Matech GT Racing	Ford GT GT3	Ford Cammer 5.0 L V8	2	(France) Dino Lunardi	1–8	M
(Switzerland) Matech GT Racing	Ford GT GT3	Ford Cammer 5.0 L V8	2	(Belgium) Eric De Doncker	All	M
(Switzerland) Matech GT Racing	Ford GT GT3	Ford Cammer 5.0 L V8	2	(Switzerland) Jonathan Hirschi	9–10	M
(Switzerland) Matech GT Racing	Ford GT GT3	Ford Cammer 5.0 L V8	2	(Germany) Christian Mamerow	11–12	M
(France) Hexis Racing AMR	Aston Martin DBRS9	Aston Martin 6.0 L V12	3	(France) Thomas Accary	All	M
(France) Hexis Racing AMR	Aston Martin DBRS9	Aston Martin 6.0 L V12	3	(France) Julien Rodrigues	All	M
(France) Hexis Racing AMR	Aston Martin DBRS9	Aston Martin 6.0 L V12	4	(France) Frédéric Makowiecki	All	M
(France) Hexis Racing AMR	Aston Martin DBRS9	Aston Martin 6.0 L V12	4	(France) Manuel Rodrigues	All	M
(Germany) Callaway Competition	Chevrolet Corvette Z06.R GT3	Chevrolet LS7 7.0 L V8	5	(France) Arnaud Peyroles	1–10	M
(Germany) Callaway Competition	Chevrolet Corvette Z06.R GT3	Chevrolet LS7 7.0 L V8	5	(Germany) Jürgen von Gartzen	1–10	M
(Germany) Callaway Competition	Chevrolet Corvette Z06.R GT3	Chevrolet LS7 7.0 L V8	6	(Italy) Luca Moro	1–6	M
(Germany) Callaway Competition	Chevrolet Corvette Z06.R GT3	Chevrolet LS7 7.0 L V8	6	(Germany) Wolfgang Kaufmann	1–6	M
(Switzerland) Kessel Racing	Ferrari 430 Scuderia GT3	Ferrari 4.3 L V8	7	(Brazil) Paulo Bonifácio	1–6	M
(Switzerland) Kessel Racing	Ferrari 430 Scuderia GT3	Ferrari 4.3 L V8	7	(Brazil) Cláudio Ricci	1–8, 11–12	M
(Switzerland) Kessel Racing	Ferrari 430 Scuderia GT3	Ferrari 4.3 L V8	7	(Brazil) Fábio Casagrande	7–8	M
(Switzerland) Kessel Racing	Ferrari 430 Scuderia GT3	Ferrari 4.3 L V8	7	(Brazil) Marcelo Hahn	11–12	M
(Switzerland) Kessel Racing	Ferrari 430 Scuderia GT3	Ferrari 4.3 L V8	8	(Italy) Andrea Palma	1–6	M
(Switzerland) Kessel Racing	Ferrari 430 Scuderia GT3	Ferrari 4.3 L V8	8	(Italy) Stefano Gattuso	All	M
(Switzerland) Kessel Racing	Ferrari 430 Scuderia GT3	Ferrari 4.3 L V8	8	(Italy) Lorenzo Bontempelli	7–8, 11–12	M
(Switzerland) Kessel Racing	Ferrari 430 Scuderia GT3	Ferrari 4.3 L V8	8	(France) Gilles Vannelet	9–10	M
(Italy) Brixia Racing	Aston Martin DBRS9	Aston Martin 6.0 L V12	9	(Italy) Leonardo Maddalena	1–2	P
(Italy) Brixia Racing	Aston Martin DBRS9	Aston Martin 6.0 L V12	9	(Italy) Marcello Zani	1–2	P
(Italy) Brixia Racing	Aston Martin DBRS9	Aston Martin 6.0 L V12	10	(United Kingdom) James Gornall	1–2	P
(Italy) Brixia Racing	Aston Martin DBRS9	Aston Martin 6.0 L V12	10	(United Kingdom) Jon Barnes	1–2	P
(Italy) Brixia Racing	Aston Martin DBRS9	Aston Martin 6.0 L V12	10	(Italy) Pietro Zumerle	3–4	P
(Italy) Brixia Racing	Aston Martin DBRS9	Aston Martin 6.0 L V12	10	(Italy) Alessandro Frassineti	3–4	P
(Italy) Brixia Racing	Aston Martin DBRS9	Aston Martin 6.0 L V12	10	(Portugal) António Coimbra	7–8	P
(Italy) Brixia Racing	Aston Martin DBRS9	Aston Martin 6.0 L V12	10	(Portugal) Luís Silva	7–8	P
(Italy) Brixia Racing	Aston Martin DBRS9	Aston Martin 6.0 L V12	10	(Czech Republic) Jaromir Jirik	9–10	P
(Italy) Brixia Racing	Aston Martin DBRS9	Aston Martin 6.0 L V12	10	(Cyprus) Christos Peyiazis	9–10	P
(Belgium) Prospeed Competition	Porsche 997 GT3 Cup S	Porsche 3.6 L Flat-6	11	(Austria) Niki Lanik	1–2	M
(Belgium) Prospeed Competition	Porsche 997 GT3 Cup S	Porsche 3.6 L Flat-6	11	(Belgium) Bart Couwberghs	1–2	M
(Belgium) Prospeed Competition	Porsche 997 GT3 Cup S	Porsche 3.6 L Flat-6	12	(Belgium) David Loix	1–2	M
(Belgium) Prospeed Competition	Porsche 997 GT3 Cup S	Porsche 3.6 L Flat-6	12	(Belgium) Geoffroy Horion	1–4	M
(Belgium) Prospeed Competition	Porsche 997 GT3 Cup S	Porsche 3.6 L Flat-6	12	(Austria) Niki Lanik	3–12	M
(Belgium) Prospeed Competition	Porsche 997 GT3 Cup S	Porsche 3.6 L Flat-6	12	(Greece) Dimitris Deverikos	5–6	M
(Belgium) Prospeed Competition	Porsche 997 GT3 Cup S	Porsche 3.6 L Flat-6	12	(Germany) Marco Holzer	7–8	M
(Belgium) Prospeed Competition	Porsche 997 GT3 Cup S	Porsche 3.6 L Flat-6	12	(Finland) Mikael Forsten	9–12	M
(Monaco) JMB Racing	Ferrari 430 Scuderia GT3^{†}	Ferrari 4.3 L V8	14	(France) Jonathan Sicart	1–2	M
(Monaco) JMB Racing	Ferrari 430 Scuderia GT3^{†}	Ferrari 4.3 L V8	14	(France) Pascal Ballay	1–2, 11–12	M
(Monaco) JMB Racing	Ferrari 430 Scuderia GT3^{†}	Ferrari 4.3 L V8	14	(France) Philippe Rambeaud	3–4, 11–12	M
(Monaco) JMB Racing	Ferrari 430 Scuderia GT3^{†}	Ferrari 4.3 L V8	14	(France) Nicolas Comar	3–4, 9–10	M
(Monaco) JMB Racing	Ferrari 430 Scuderia GT3^{†}	Ferrari 4.3 L V8	14	(France) Bruce Lorgeré-Roux	5–6	M
(Monaco) JMB Racing	Ferrari 430 Scuderia GT3^{†}	Ferrari 4.3 L V8	14	(Italy) Andrea Garbagnati	5–6, 9–10	M
(Monaco) JMB Racing	Ferrari 430 Scuderia GT3^{†}	Ferrari 4.3 L V8	15	(France) Yannick Mallégol	1–2	M
(Monaco) JMB Racing	Ferrari 430 Scuderia GT3^{†}	Ferrari 4.3 L V8	15	(France) Jean-Marc Bachelier	1–2	M
(Monaco) JMB Racing	Ferrari 430 Scuderia GT3^{†}	Ferrari 4.3 L V8	15	(France) Michel Mhitarian	5–6	M
(Monaco) JMB Racing	Ferrari 430 Scuderia GT3^{†}	Ferrari 4.3 L V8	15	(France) Pascal Ballay	5–10	M
(Monaco) JMB Racing	Ferrari 430 Scuderia GT3^{†}	Ferrari 4.3 L V8	15	(France) Edouard Gravereaux	7–10	M
(France) Marc Sourd Racing	Chevrolet Corvette Z06.R GT3	Chevrolet LS7 7.0 L V8	16	(France) Johan Charpilienne	1–6	M
(France) Marc Sourd Racing	Chevrolet Corvette Z06.R GT3	Chevrolet LS7 7.0 L V8	16	(France) Marc Sourd	1–10	M
(France) Marc Sourd Racing	Chevrolet Corvette Z06.R GT3	Chevrolet LS7 7.0 L V8	16	(Germany) Luca Ludwig	7–10	M
(France) Marc Sourd Racing	Chevrolet Corvette Z06.R GT3	Chevrolet LS7 7.0 L V8	17	(Italy) Luca Pirri	1–10	M
(France) Marc Sourd Racing	Chevrolet Corvette Z06.R GT3	Chevrolet LS7 7.0 L V8	17	(Italy) Diego Alessi	1–10	M
(Belgium) Mühlner Motorsport	Porsche 997 GT3 Cup S	Porsche 3.6 L Flat-6	18	(Germany) Tim Bergmeister	1–4	M
(Belgium) Mühlner Motorsport	Porsche 997 GT3 Cup S	Porsche 3.6 L Flat-6	18	(Czech Republic) Jaromir Jirik	1–4	M
(Belgium) Mühlner Motorsport	Porsche 997 GT3 Cup S	Porsche 3.6 L Flat-6	18	(Cyprus) Doros Loucaides	7–8	M
(Belgium) Mühlner Motorsport	Porsche 997 GT3 Cup S	Porsche 3.6 L Flat-6	18	(France) Gilles Vannelet	7–8	M
(Belgium) Mühlner Motorsport	Porsche 997 GT3 Cup S	Porsche 3.6 L Flat-6	18	(France) Dino Lunardi	9–10	M
(Belgium) Mühlner Motorsport	Porsche 997 GT3 Cup S	Porsche 3.6 L Flat-6	18	(Austria) Johannes Stuck	9–10	M
(Belgium) Mühlner Motorsport	Porsche 997 GT3 Cup S	Porsche 3.6 L Flat-6	18	(Finland) Petri Lappalainen	11–12	M
(Belgium) Mühlner Motorsport	Porsche 997 GT3 Cup S	Porsche 3.6 L Flat-6	18	(Finland) Markus Palttala	11–12	M
(Belgium) Mühlner Motorsport	Porsche 997 GT3 Cup S	Porsche 3.6 L Flat-6	19	(United Kingdom) Sean Edwards	1–2	M
(Belgium) Mühlner Motorsport	Porsche 997 GT3 Cup S	Porsche 3.6 L Flat-6	19	(United Kingdom) Oliver Morley	1–2	M
(Belgium) Mühlner Motorsport	Porsche 997 GT3 Cup S	Porsche 3.6 L Flat-6	19	(Greece) Dimitros Deverikos	3–4	M
(Belgium) Mühlner Motorsport	Porsche 997 GT3 Cup S	Porsche 3.6 L Flat-6	19	(Czech Republic) Jaromir Jirik	3–4	M
(Belgium) Mühlner Motorsport	Porsche 997 GT3 Cup S	Porsche 3.6 L Flat-6	19	(Germany) Marc Basseng	5–6	M
(Belgium) Mühlner Motorsport	Porsche 997 GT3 Cup S	Porsche 3.6 L Flat-6	19	(Germany) Jürgen Häring	5–8	M
(Belgium) Mühlner Motorsport	Porsche 997 GT3 Cup S	Porsche 3.6 L Flat-6	19	(Greece) Dimitrios Konstantinou	7–8	M
(Belgium) Mühlner Motorsport	Porsche 997 GT3 Cup S	Porsche 3.6 L Flat-6	19	(France) Christophe Lapierre	9–10	M
(Belgium) Mühlner Motorsport	Porsche 997 GT3 Cup S	Porsche 3.6 L Flat-6	19	(Cyprus) Doros Loucaides	9–12	M
(Belgium) Mühlner Motorsport	Porsche 997 GT3 Cup S	Porsche 3.6 L Flat-6	19	(Finland) Petri Mannila	11–12	M
(United Kingdom) APEX Racing	Jaguar XKR-S GT3	Jaguar 4.2 L Supercharged V8	20	(United Kingdom) Chris Dymond	1–2	M
(United Kingdom) APEX Racing	Jaguar XKR-S GT3	Jaguar 4.2 L Supercharged V8	20	(United Kingdom) Bradley Ellis	1–2	M
(United Kingdom) Trackspeed	Porsche 997 GT3 Cup S	Porsche 3.6 L Flat-6	22	(United Kingdom) Tim Sugden	1–4	M
(United Kingdom) Trackspeed	Porsche 997 GT3 Cup S	Porsche 3.6 L Flat-6	22	(United Kingdom) David Ashburn	All	M
(United Kingdom) Trackspeed	Porsche 997 GT3 Cup S	Porsche 3.6 L Flat-6	22	(United Kingdom) Sean Edwards	5–6	M
(United Kingdom) Trackspeed	Porsche 997 GT3 Cup S	Porsche 3.6 L Flat-6	22	(Germany) Tim Bergmeister	7–8	M
(United Kingdom) Trackspeed	Porsche 997 GT3 Cup S	Porsche 3.6 L Flat-6	22	(Austria) Martin Ragginger	9–10	M
(United Kingdom) Trackspeed	Porsche 997 GT3 Cup S	Porsche 3.6 L Flat-6	22	(United Kingdom) Phil Keen	11–12	M
(Germany) Alpina	BMW Alpina B6 GT3	BMW 4.4 L Supercharged V8	24	(Germany) Claudia Hürtgen	All	M
(Germany) Alpina	BMW Alpina B6 GT3	BMW 4.4 L Supercharged V8	24	(Hungary) Csaba Walter	All	M
(Germany) Alpina	BMW Alpina B6 GT3	BMW 4.4 L Supercharged V8	25	(Germany) Christian Mamerow	5–6	M
(Germany) Alpina	BMW Alpina B6 GT3	BMW 4.4 L Supercharged V8	25	(Germany) Jens Klingmann	5–10	M
(Germany) Alpina	BMW Alpina B6 GT3	BMW 4.4 L Supercharged V8	25	(Czech Republic) Martin Matzke	7–12	M
(Germany) Phoenix Racing	Audi R8 LMS	Audi 5.2 L V10	26	(Germany) Christopher Haase	All	M
(Germany) Phoenix Racing	Audi R8 LMS	Audi 5.2 L V10	26	(Germany) Christopher Mies	All	M
(Germany) Phoenix Racing	Audi R8 LMS	Audi 5.2 L V10	27	(Switzerland) Jean-Denis Délétraz	1–10	M
(Germany) Phoenix Racing	Audi R8 LMS	Audi 5.2 L V10	27	(Switzerland) Lloyd La Marca	1–10	M
(Germany) Fischer Racing	Ford GT GT3	Ford Cammer 5.0 L V8	28	(Germany) Florian Gruber	All	M
(Germany) Fischer Racing	Ford GT GT3	Ford Cammer 5.0 L V8	28	(Denmark) Christoffer Nygaard	All	M
(Germany) Fischer Racing	Ford GT GT3	Ford Cammer 5.0 L V8	29	(Germany) Harald Becker	1–2	M
(Germany) Fischer Racing	Ford GT GT3	Ford Cammer 5.0 L V8	29	(Germany) Christian Hohenadel	1–2	M
(Germany) Fischer Racing	Ford GT GT3	Ford Cammer 5.0 L V8	29	(Germany) Frank Kräling	3–6, 9–10	M
(Germany) Fischer Racing	Ford GT GT3	Ford Cammer 5.0 L V8	29	(Germany) Jochen Krumbach	3–4	M
(Germany) Fischer Racing	Ford GT GT3	Ford Cammer 5.0 L V8	29	(Germany) Marc Gindorf	5–6, 9–10	M
(Germany) Reiter Engineering	Lamborghini Gallardo GT3	Lamborghini 5.0 L V10	30	(Switzerland) Alexander Frei	1–10	P
(Germany) Reiter Engineering	Lamborghini Gallardo GT3	Lamborghini 5.0 L V10	30	(France) Jonathan Cochet	1–10	P
(Germany) Reiter Engineering	Lamborghini Gallardo GT3	Lamborghini 5.0 L V10	31	(Germany) Albert von Thurn und Taxis	1–10	P
(Germany) Reiter Engineering	Lamborghini Gallardo GT3	Lamborghini 5.0 L V10	31	(Germany) Klaus Ludwig	1–10	P
(Germany) Team Rosberg	Audi R8 LMS	Audi 5.2 L V10	32	(France) Nicolas Armindo	All	M
(Germany) Team Rosberg	Audi R8 LMS	Audi 5.2 L V10	32	(Portugal) César Campaniço	All	M
(Germany) Team Rosberg	Audi R8 LMS	Audi 5.2 L V10	33	(Czech Republic) Jiri Navratil	All	M
(Germany) Team Rosberg	Audi R8 LMS	Audi 5.2 L V10	33	(Czech Republic) Martin Matzke	1–6	M
(Germany) Team Rosberg	Audi R8 LMS	Audi 5.2 L V10	33	(Germany) Oliver Mayer	7–8	M
(Germany) Team Rosberg	Audi R8 LMS	Audi 5.2 L V10	33	(Brazil) Paulo Bonifácio	9–12	M
(France) M.P. Racing (France) Sport Garage	BMW Alpina B6 GT3	BMW 4.4 L Supercharged V8	34	(Argentina) José Manuel Balbiani	1–2	P
(France) M.P. Racing (France) Sport Garage	BMW Alpina B6 GT3	BMW 4.4 L Supercharged V8	34	(France) Michaël Petit	1–2, 5–6	P
(France) M.P. Racing (France) Sport Garage	BMW Alpina B6 GT3	BMW 4.4 L Supercharged V8	34	(Germany) Valentin Hummel	5–6	P
(France) M.P. Racing (France) Sport Garage	BMW Alpina B6 GT3	BMW 4.4 L Supercharged V8	34	(France) Romain Brandela	9–12	P
(France) M.P. Racing (France) Sport Garage	BMW Alpina B6 GT3	BMW 4.4 L Supercharged V8	34	(France) Arthur Bleynie	9–12	P
(France) M.P. Racing (France) Sport Garage	BMW Alpina B6 GT3	BMW 4.4 L Supercharged V8	35	(France) Pierre-Brice Mena	1–2, 5–6	P
(France) M.P. Racing (France) Sport Garage	BMW Alpina B6 GT3	BMW 4.4 L Supercharged V8	35	(France) Gilles Vannelet	1–6	P
(France) M.P. Racing (France) Sport Garage	BMW Alpina B6 GT3	BMW 4.4 L Supercharged V8	35	(France) Michaël Petit	3–4, 11–12	P
(France) M.P. Racing (France) Sport Garage	BMW Alpina B6 GT3	BMW 4.4 L Supercharged V8	35	(United Kingdom) Chris Dymond	5–6	P
(France) M.P. Racing (France) Sport Garage	BMW Alpina B6 GT3	BMW 4.4 L Supercharged V8	35	(France) Kévin Estre	9–10	P
(France) M.P. Racing (France) Sport Garage	BMW Alpina B6 GT3	BMW 4.4 L Supercharged V8	35	(France) Paul Surand	9–10	P
(France) M.P. Racing (France) Sport Garage	BMW Alpina B6 GT3	BMW 4.4 L Supercharged V8	35	(Belgium) Armand Fumal	11–12	P
(Germany) Zakspeed	Dodge Viper Competition Coupe	Dodge 8.3 L V10	36	(Germany) Wido Rössler	1–6	M
(Germany) Zakspeed	Dodge Viper Competition Coupe	Dodge 8.3 L V10	36	(Germany) Sascha Bert	1–6	M
(Germany) Zakspeed	Dodge Viper Competition Coupe	Dodge 8.3 L V10	37	(Germany) Marc Bronzel	1–8	M
(Germany) Zakspeed	Dodge Viper Competition Coupe	Dodge 8.3 L V10	37	(Germany) Markus Gedlich	1–2	M
(Germany) Zakspeed	Dodge Viper Competition Coupe	Dodge 8.3 L V10	37	(Czech Republic) Jiri Skula	3–4	M
(Germany) Zakspeed	Dodge Viper Competition Coupe	Dodge 8.3 L V10	37	(Netherlands) Duncan Huisman	5–6	M
(Germany) Zakspeed	Dodge Viper Competition Coupe	Dodge 8.3 L V10	37	(Germany) Christian Mamerow	7–8	M
(Germany) Team Rhino's Leipert	Ascari KZ1R GT3	BMW S62 5.0 L V8	38	(Denmark) Ronnie Bremer	11–12	M
(Germany) Team Rhino's Leipert	Ascari KZ1R GT3	BMW S62 5.0 L V8	38	(Germany) Norman Knop	11–12	M
(United Kingdom) CRS Racing	Ferrari 430 Scuderia GT3	Ferrari 4.3 L V8	55	(Canada) Chris Niarchos	1–2	M
(United Kingdom) CRS Racing	Ferrari 430 Scuderia GT3	Ferrari 4.3 L V8	55	(United Kingdom) Chris Goodwin	All	M
(United Kingdom) CRS Racing	Ferrari 430 Scuderia GT3	Ferrari 4.3 L V8	55	(Netherlands) Klaas Hummel	3–12	M
(United Kingdom) CRS Racing	Ferrari 430 Scuderia GT3	Ferrari 4.3 L V8	56	(United States) Robert Hissom	1–6	M
(United Kingdom) CRS Racing	Ferrari 430 Scuderia GT3	Ferrari 4.3 L V8	56	(United Kingdom) Phil Quaife	All	M
(United Kingdom) CRS Racing	Ferrari 430 Scuderia GT3	Ferrari 4.3 L V8	56	(Netherlands) Danny van Dongen	7–12	M
(France) AutoGT Racing	Morgan Aero SuperSports GT3	BMW 5.0 L V8	100	(France) Dimitri Enjalbert	1–10	M
(France) AutoGT Racing	Morgan Aero SuperSports GT3	BMW 5.0 L V8	100	(France) Johan-Boris Scheier	All	M
(France) AutoGT Racing	Morgan Aero SuperSports GT3	BMW 5.0 L V8	100	(France) Julien Briché	11–12	M
(France) AutoGT Racing	Morgan Aero SuperSports GT3	BMW 5.0 L V8	101	(France) Gaël Lesoudier	All	M
(France) AutoGT Racing	Morgan Aero SuperSports GT3	BMW 5.0 L V8	101	(Belgium) Maxime Martin	All	M

† – JMB Racing were allowed by the FIA to use a 2008 Ferrari F430 GT3 for their #14 entry at Silverstone due to not having a second 430 Scuderia GT3 prepared in time.

== Schedule and results ==
Round	Circuit	Date	Pole position	Fastest lap	Winning drivers
1	(United Kingdom) Silverstone Circuit	2 May	(France) #100 AutoGT Racing	(France) #3 Hexis Racing AMR	(France) #100 AutoGT Racing
1	(United Kingdom) Silverstone Circuit	2 May	(France) Johan-Boris Scheier (France) Dimitri Enjalbert	(France) Julien Rodrigues (France) Thomas Accary	(France) Johan-Boris Scheier (France) Dimitri Enjalbert
2	(United Kingdom) Silverstone Circuit	3 May	(France) #101 AutoGT Racing	(Belgium) #19 Mühlner Motorsport	(France) #101 AutoGT Racing
2	(United Kingdom) Silverstone Circuit	3 May	(Belgium) Maxime Martin (France) Gaël Lesoudier	(United Kingdom) Sean Edwards (United Kingdom) Oliver Morley	(Belgium) Maxime Martin (France) Gaël Lesoudier
3	(Italy) Adria International Raceway	16 May	(Switzerland) #2 Matech GT Racing	(Switzerland) #2 Matech GT Racing	(Switzerland) #2 Matech GT Racing
3	(Italy) Adria International Raceway	16 May	(France) Dino Lunardi (Belgium) Eric De Doncker	(France) Dino Lunardi (Belgium) Eric De Doncker	(France) Dino Lunardi (Belgium) Eric De Doncker
4	(Italy) Adria International Raceway	16 May	(France) #101 AutoGT Racing	(France) #4 Hexis Racing AMR	(France) #4 Hexis Racing AMR
4	(Italy) Adria International Raceway	16 May	(Belgium) Maxime Martin (France) Gaël Lesoudier	(France) Manuel Rodrigues (France) Frédéric Makowiecki	(France) Manuel Rodrigues (France) Frédéric Makowiecki
5	(Germany) Motorsport Arena Oschersleben	20 June	(France) #3 Hexis Racing AMR	(Switzerland) #2 Matech GT Racing	(France) #3 Hexis Racing AMR
5	(Germany) Motorsport Arena Oschersleben	20 June	(France) Thomas Accary (France) Julien Rodrigues	(France) Dino Lunardi (Belgium) Eric de Doncker	(France) Thomas Accary (France) Julien Rodrigues
6	(Germany) Motorsport Arena Oschersleben	21 June	(France) #4 Hexis Racing AMR	(France) #4 Hexis Racing AMR	(Germany) #28 Fischer Racing
6	(Germany) Motorsport Arena Oschersleben	21 June	(France) Frédéric Makowiecki (France) Manuel Rodrigues	(France) Frédéric Makowiecki (France) Manuel Rodrigues	(Germany) Florian Gruber (Denmark) Christoffer Nygaard
7	(Portugal) Autódromo Internacional do Algarve	12 September	(Switzerland) #1 Matech GT Racing	(Switzerland) #2 Matech GT Racing	(Germany) #26 Phoenix Racing
7	(Portugal) Autódromo Internacional do Algarve	12 September	(Brazil) Walter Salles (Germany) Thomas Mutsch	(Belgium) Eric de Doncker (France) Dino Lunardi	(Germany) Christopher Haase (Germany) Christopher Mies
8	(Portugal) Autódromo Internacional do Algarve	13 September	(Germany) #37 Zakspeed Racing	(Switzerland) #2 Matech GT Racing	(Germany) #26 Phoenix Racing
8	(Portugal) Autódromo Internacional do Algarve	13 September	(Germany) Marc Bronzel (Germany) Christian Mamerow	(Belgium) Eric de Doncker (France) Dino Lunardi	(Germany) Christopher Haase (Germany) Christopher Mies
9	(France) Circuit Paul Ricard	3 October	(Germany) #25 Alpina	(France) #3 Hexis Racing AMR	(France) #3 Hexis Racing AMR
9	(France) Circuit Paul Ricard	3 October	(Germany) Jens Klingmann (Czech Republic) Martin Matzke	(France) Thomas Accary (France) Julien Rodrigues	(France) Thomas Accary (France) Julien Rodrigues
10	(France) Circuit Paul Ricard	4 October	(France) #4 Hexis Racing AMR	(Switzerland) #1 Matech GT Racing	(Switzerland) #1 Matech GT Racing
10	(France) Circuit Paul Ricard	4 October	(France) Frédéric Makowiecki (France) Manuel Rodrigues	(Brazil) Walter Salles (Germany) Thomas Mutsch	(Brazil) Walter Salles (Germany) Thomas Mutsch
11	(Belgium) Zolder	24 October	(Germany) #26 Phoenix Racing	(France) #101 AutoGt Racing	(Germany) #26 Phoenix Racing
11	(Belgium) Zolder	24 October	(Germany) Christopher Haase (Germany) Christopher Mies	(France) Gaël Lesoudier (France) Maxime Martin	(Germany) Christopher Haase (Germany) Christopher Mies
12	(Belgium) Zolder	25 October	(France) #4 Hexis Racing AMR	(France) #4 Hexis Racing AMR	(Switzerland) #8 Kessel Racing
12	(Belgium) Zolder	25 October	(France) Frédéric Makowiecki (France) Manuel Rodrigues	(France) Frédéric Makowiecki (France) Manuel Rodrigues	(Italy) Lorenzo Bontempelli (Italy) Stefano Gattuso

== Championships ==
Points are awarded to the top eight finishers in the order 10-8-6-5-4-3-2-1. Cars which failed to complete 75% of the winner's distance are awarded half the points awarded for completing the 75% race distance.

=== Drivers Championship ===
Pos	Driver	Team	Rd 1	Rd 2	Rd 3	Rd 4	Rd 5	Rd 6	Rd 7	Rd 8	Rd 9‡	Rd 10	Rd 11	Rd 12	Total
1=	(Germany) Christopher Haase	(Germany) Phoenix Racing	27	2	9	23	2	6	1	1	8	DNS	1	4	54.5
1=	(Germany) Christopher Mies	(Germany) Phoenix Racing	27	2	9	23	2	6	1	1	8	DNS	1	4	54.5
3=	(France) Thomas Accary	(France) Hexis Racing AMR	2	4	5	7	1	3	Ret	Ret	1	Ret	9	6	43
3=	(France) Julien Rodrigues	(France) Hexis Racing AMR	2	4	5	7	1	3	Ret	Ret	1	Ret	9	6	43
3=	(France) Nicolas Armindo	(Germany) Team Rosberg	3	3			4	2	5	Ret	DNS	2	4	8	43
3=	(Portugal) César Campaniço	(Germany) Team Rosberg	3	3			4	2	5	Ret	DNS	2	4	8	43
7=	(France) Frédéric Makowiecki	(France) Hexis Racing AMR	Ret	5	3	1	13	4	Ret	Ret	15	4	5	13	34
7=	(France) Manuel Rodrigues	(France) Hexis Racing AMR	Ret	5	3	1	13	4	Ret	Ret	15	4	5	13	34
9	(Italy) Stefano Gattuso	(Switzerland) Kessel Racing	DNS	Ret	Ret	3	11	15	17	3	11	6	2	1	33
10=	(Germany) Florian Gruber	(Germany) Fischer Racing	4	9	Ret	DNS	Ret	1	2	DNS	7	Ret	3	9	30
10=	(Denmark) Christoffer Nygaard	(Germany) Fischer Racing	4	9	Ret	DNS	Ret	1	2	DNS	7	Ret	3	9	30
10=	(Brazil) Walter Salles	(Switzerland) Matech GT Racing	Ret	Ret	2	20	7	7	4	13	22	1	6	Ret	30
10=	(Germany) Thomas Mutsch	(Switzerland) Matech GT Racing	Ret	Ret	2	20	7	7	4	13	22	1	6	Ret	30
14=	(Italy) Lorenzo Bontempelli	(Switzerland) Kessel Racing							17	3			2	1	24
14=	(Belgium) Eric De Doncker	(Switzerland) Matech GT Racing	7	11	1	21	3	12	Ret	14	Ret	DNS	11	3	24
16=	(France) Gaël Lesoudier	(France) AutoGT Racing	6	1	18	2	15	Ret	Ret	Ret	19	Ret	7	16	23
16=	(Belgium) Maxime Martin	(France) AutoGT Racing	6	1	18	2	15	Ret	Ret	Ret	19	Ret	7	16	23
18	(France) Dino Lunardi	(Switzerland) Matech GT Racing	7	11	1	21	3	12	Ret	14					22
18	(France) Dino Lunardi	(Belgium) Mühlner Motorsport									9	5			22
19=	(Germany) Claudia Hürtgen	(Germany) Alpina	8	7	7	11	5	27	Ret	10	6	8	20	2	18.5
19=	(Hungary) Csaba Walter	(Germany) Alpina	8	7	7	11	5	27	Ret	10	6	8	20	2	18.5
21=	(Italy) Luca Pirri	(France) Marc Sourd Racing	9	8	Ret	9	6	23	3	2	12	Ret			18
21=	(Italy) Diego Alessi	(France) Marc Sourd Racing	9	8	Ret	9	6	23	3	2	12	Ret			18
23	(France) Johan-Boris Scheier	(France) AutoGT Racing	1	Ret	Ret	DNS	DNS	8	Ret	Ret	4	Ret	8	11	14.5
24	(Austria) Niki Lanik	(Belgium) Prospeed Competition	14	Ret	4	6	Ret	11	8	4	14	10	Ret	10	14
25	(France) Dimitri Enjalbert	(France) AutoGT Racing	1	Ret	Ret	DNS	DNS	8	Ret	Ret	4	Ret			13.5
26=	(Czech Republic) Martin Matzke	(Germany) Team Rosberg	19	13	Ret	18	14	10							11
26=	(Czech Republic) Martin Matzke	(Germany) Alpina							6	5	2	18	19	14	11
26=	(Germany) Jens Klingmann	(Germany) Alpina					10	22	6	5	2	18	19	14	11
26=	(France) Marc Sourd	(France) Marc Sourd Racing	26	15	Ret	DNS	Ret	25	9	6	5	3			11
26=	(Germany) Luca Ludwig	(France) Marc Sourd Racing							9	6	5	3			11
30=	(Czech Republic) Jaromir Jirik	(Belgium) Mühlner Motorsport	5	6	Ret	8					26	14			8
30=	(Belgium) Geoffroy Horion	(Belgium) Prospeed Competition	28	Ret	4	6									8
32	(Germany) Tim Bergmeister	(Belgium) Mühlner Motorsport	5	6	10	9									7
33=	(Italy) Andrea Palma	(Switzerland) Kessel Racing	DNS	Ret	Ret	3	11	15							6
33=	(United Kingdom) David Ashburn	(United Kingdom) Trackspeed Racing	15	20	14	4	8	Ret	10	9	20	16	Ret	DNS	6
33=	(Germany) Marco Holzer	(Belgium) Prospeed Competition							8	4					6
33=	(Germany) Christian Mamerow	(Switzerland) Matech GT Racing					10	22	14	Ret			11	3	6
37=	(Germany) Klaus Ludwig	(Germany) Reiter Engineering	21	17	8	5	17	17	Ret	11	10	DNS			5
37=	(Germany) Albert von Thurn und Taxis	(Germany) Reiter Engineering	21	17	8	5	17	17	Ret	11	10	DNS			5
37=	(United Kingdom) Tim Sugden	(United Kingdom) Trackspeed Racing	15	20	14	4									5
37=	(Switzerland) Lloyd La Marca	(Germany) Phoenix Racing	10	26	11	12	20	19	7	7	17	8			5
37=	(Switzerland) Jean-Denis Délétraz	(Germany) Phoenix Racing	10	26	11	12	20	19	7	7	17	8			5
42=	(Germany) Jürgen Häring	(Belgium) Mühlner Motorsport					9	5	12	12					4
42=	(Germany) Marc Basseng	(Belgium) Mühlner Motorsport					9	5							4
42=	(United Kingdom) Phil Quaife	(United Kingdom) CRS Racing	17	12	Ret	Ret	Ret	18	16	8	3	DNS	15	Ret	4
42=	(Netherlands) Danny van Dongen	(United Kingdom) CRS Racing							16	8	3	DNS	15	Ret	4
42=	(Austria) Johannes Stuck	(Belgium) Mühlner Motorsport									9	5			4
42=	(Belgium) Armand Fumal	(France) M.P. Racing											12	5	4
42=	(France) Michaël Petit	(France) M.P. Racing	Ret	Ret	13	15	23	Ret					12	5	4
49=	(Germany) Wido Rössler	(Germany) Zakspeed Racing	16	Ret	6	19									3
49=	(Germany) Sascha Bert	(Germany) Zakspeed Racing	16	Ret	6	19									3
49=	(France) Gilles Vannelet	(Switzerland) Kessel Racing	11	Ret	13	15	18	20	11	Ret	11	6			3
52=	(Czech Republic) Jiri Navratil	(Germany) Team Rosberg	19	13	Ret	18	14	10	Ret	Ret	Ret	7	18	Ret	2
52=	(Brazil) Paulo Bonifácio	(Switzerland) Kessel Racing	Ret	18	Ret	13	26	14							2
52=	(Brazil) Paulo Bonifácio	(Germany) Team Rosberg									Ret	7	18	Ret	2
52=	(Finland) Petri Lappalainen	(Belgium) Mühlner Motorsport											10	7	2
52=	(Finland) Markus Palttala	(Belgium) Mühlner Motorsport											10	7	2
56=	(Greece) Dimitris Deverikos	(Germany) Mühlner Motorsport			Ret	8	Ret	11							1
56=	(Greece) Dimitris Deverikos	(Belgium) Prospeed Competition					Ret	11							1
56=	(United Kingdom) Sean Edwards	(Belgium) Mühlner Motorsport	13	10											1
56=	(United Kingdom) Sean Edwards	(United Kingdom) Trackspeed Racing					8	Ret							1
56=	(France) Julien Briché	(France) AutoGt Racing											8	11	1

^{‡}Half points were awarded as less than 75% of the race was completed.

=== Teams Championship ===
Pos	Team	Rnd 1	Rnd 2	Rnd 3	Rnd 4	Rnd 5	Rnd 6	Rnd 7	Rnd 8	Rnd 9	Rnd 10	Rnd 11	Rnd 12	Total
1	(France) Hexis Racing AMR	8	9	11	14	10	11			5	5	11	6	90
2	(Switzerland) Matech GT Racing	2		18		8	3	6			10	7	8	62
3	(Germany) Team Rosberg	6	6			5	9	5			11	10	3	55
4	(Germany) Phoenix Racing		8	2	1	8	4	13	13	0.5	2			51.5
5	(France) AutoGT Racing	13	10		8	2			2.5			9	2	46.5
6	(France) Marc Sourd Racing	1	2		3	3		10	12	2	6			39
7	(Germany) Alpina					5		4	6	5.5	1		10	31.5
8	(Belgium) Mühlner Motorsport	4	3					1			4	2	4	18
9	(Germany) Fischer Racing	5	1				10			1				17
10	(Switzerland) Kessel Racing				6				6					12
11	(Germany) Reiter Engineering			3	5									8
12	(France) M.P. Racing												6	6
13	(United Kingdom) CRS Racing								2	3				5
14	(Germany) Zakspeed Racing			4										4
15	(Germany) Callaway Competition			1	2									3

=== Manufacturer Cups ===
The Manufacturer Cups are open to any manufacturer who supplies at two or more teams in the full season. Points are awarded based on the driver's position within that manufacturer's class.

==== Aston Martin ====
Pos	Driver	Team	Rd 1	Rd 2	Rd 3	Rd 4	Rd 5	Rd 6	Rd 7	Rd 8	Rd 9	Rd 10	Rd 11	Rd 12	Total
1=	(France) Thomas Accary	(France) Hexis Racing AMR	10	10	6	6	6	6			4		5	6	59
1=	(France) Julien Rodrigues	(France) Hexis Racing AMR	10	10	6	6	6	6			4		5	6	59
3=	(France) Frédéric Makowiecki	(France) Hexis Racing AMR		8	8	8	5	5			3	8	6	5	56
3=	(France) Manuel Rodrigues	(France) Hexis Racing AMR		8	8	8	5	5			3	8	6	5	56
5	(Italy) Marcello Zani	(Italy) Brixia Racing	8	5	5										18
6=	(Portugal) Antonio Coimbra	(Italy) Brixia Racing							8	8					16
6=	(Portugal) Luis Silva	(Italy) Brixia Racing							8	8					16
8	(Italy) Leonardo Maddalena	(Italy) Brixia Racing	8	5											13
9=	(Czech Republic) Jaromir Jirik	(Italy) Brixia Racing									2.5	6			8.5
9=	(Cyprus) Christos Peyiazis	(Italy) Brixia Racing									2.5	6			8.5
11=	(United Kingdom) James Gornall	(Italy) Brixia Racing		6											6
11=	(United Kingdom) Jon Barnes	(Italy) Brixia Racing		6											6
13	(Italy) Pietro Zumerle	(Italy) Brixia Racing			5										5

==== Audi ====
Pos	Driver	Team	Rd 1	Rd 2	Rd 3	Rd 4	Rd 5	Rd 6	Rd 7	Rd 8	Rd 9	Rd 10	Rd 11	Rd 12	Total
1=	(Germany) Christopher Haase	(Germany) Phoenix Racing	5	10	10	6	10	8	10	10	5		8	8	90
1=	(Germany) Christopher Mies	(Germany) Phoenix Racing	5	10	10	6	10	8	10	10	5		8	8	90
3=	(Portugal) César Campaniço	(Germany) Team Rosberg	10	8			8	10	8			10	6	6	66
3=	(France) Nicolas Armindo	(Germany) Team Rosberg	10	8			8	10	8			10	6	6	66
5=	(Switzerland) Jean-Denis Délétraz	(Germany) Phoenix Racing	8	5	8	10		5	6	8	4	6			60
5=	(Switzerland) Lloyd La Marca	(Germany) Phoenix Racing	8	5	8	10		5	6	8	4	6			60
7	(Czech Republic) Jiri Navratil	(Germany) Team Rosberg	6	6		8	6	6			3	8	5		48
8	(Czech Republic) Martin Matzke	(Germany) Team Rosberg	6	6		8	6	6							32
9=	(Brazil) Paulo Bonifácio	(Germany) Team Rosberg									3	8	5		16

==== BMW Alpina ====
Pos	Driver	Team	Rd 1	Rd 2	Rd 3	Rd 4	Rd 5	Rd 6	Rd 7	Rd 8	Rd 9	Rd 10	Rd 11	Rd 12	Total
1=	(Germany) Claudia Hürtgen	(Germany) Alpina	8	8	6	6	10	6		5	4	10	5	10	78
1=	(Hungary) Csaba Walter	(Germany) Alpina	8	8	6	6	10	6		5	4	10	5	10	78
3	(Germany) Jens Klingmann	(Germany) Alpina					8	8	6	6	5	6	6	6	51
4	(Czech Republic) Martin Matzke	(Germany) Alpina							6	6	5	6	6	6	35
5	(France) Michaël Petit	(France) M.P. Racing			5	5	5						10	8	33
6	(France) Gilles Vannelet	(France) M.P. Racing	6		5	5	6	10							32
7	(Belgium) Armand Fumal	(France) M.P. Racing											10	8	18
8=	(Germany) Christian Mamerow	(Germany) Alpina					8	8							16
8=	(United Kingdom) Chris Dymond	(France) M.P. Racing					6	10							16
10=	(France) Kévin Estre	(France) M.P. Racing									3	8			11
10=	(France) Paul Surand	(France) M.P. Racing									3	8			11
12=	(France) Romain Brandela	(France) M.P. Racing									2.5		8		10.5
12=	(France) Arthur Bleynie	(France) M.P. Racing									2.5		8		10.5
14	(France) Pierre-Brice Mena	(France) M.P. Racing	6												6
15	(Germany) Valentin Hummel	(France) M.P. Racing					5								5

==== Corvette ====
Pos	Driver	Team	Rd 1	Rd 2	Rd 3	Rd 4	Rd 5	Rd 6	Rd 7	Rd 8	Rd 9	Rd 10	Rd 11	Rd 12	Total
1=	(Italy) Luca Pirri	(France) Marc Sourd Racing	10	10		10	10	10	8	8	3				69
1=	(Italy) Diego Alessi	(France) Marc Sourd Racing	10	10		10	10	10	8	8	3				69
3=	(France) Arnaud Peyroles	(Germany) Callaway Competition	8	8	10	8	8				2.5				44.5
3=	(Germany) Jürgen von Gartzen	(Germany) Callaway Competition	8	8	10	8	8				2.5				44.5
5	(France) Marc Sourd	(France) Marc Sourd Racing	6	6				8	6	6	4	8			44
6	(Germany) Luca Ludwig	(France) Marc Sourd Racing							6	6	4	8			24
7	(France) Johan Charpilienne	(France) Marc Sourd Racing	6	6				8							20
8=	(Italy) Luca Moro	(Germany) Callaway Competition		5	8	6									19
8=	(Germany) Wolfgang Kaufmann	(Germany) Callaway Competition		5	8	6									19

==== Ferrari ====
Pos	Driver	Team	Rd 1	Rd 2	Rd 3	Rd 4	Rd 5	Rd 6	Rd 7	Rd 8	Rd 9	Rd 10	Rd 11	Rd 12	Total
1	(Italy) Stefano Gattuso	(Switzerland) Kessel Racing				10	10	8	8	10	4	10	10	10	80
2	(United Kingdom) Phil Quaife	(United Kingdom) CRS Racing	8	8				6	10	8	5		8		53
3	(Italy) Lorenzo Bontempelli	(Switzerland) Kessel Racing							8	10			10	10	38
4	(United Kingdom) Chris Goodwin	(United Kingdom) CRS Racing	5			6	6	5			2.5	8			32.5
5=	(France) Pascal Ballay	(Monaco) JMB Racing					5		6	6			6	8	31
5=	(Netherlands) Danny van Dongen	(United Kingdom) CRS Racing							10	8	5		8		31
7	(France) Philippe Rambeaud	(Monaco) JMB Racing			10	5							6	8	29
8	(Italy) Andrea Palma	(Monaco) JMB Racing				10	10	8							28
9	(Netherlands) Klaas Hummel	(United Kingdom) CRS Racing				6	6	5			2.5	8			27.5
10=	(Brazil) Cláudio Ricci	(Switzerland) Kessel Racing		6		8		10							24
10=	(Brazil) Paulo Bonifácio	(Switzerland) Kessel Racing		6		8		10							24
10=	(France) Nicolas Comar	(Monaco) JMB Racing			10	5					3	6			24
13	(United States) Robert Hissom	(United Kingdom) CRS Racing	8	8				6							22
14	(Italy) Andrea Garbagnati	(Monaco) JMB Racing					8				3	6			17
15	(France) Gilles Vannelet	(Switzerland) Kessel Racing									4	10			14
16	(France) Edouard Gravereaux	(Monaco) JMB Racing							6	6					12
17=	(France) Jean-Marc Bachelier	(Monaco) JMB Racing	6	5											11
17=	(France) Yannick Mallegol	(Monaco) JMB Racing	6	5											11
19	(France) Bruce Lorgere-Roux	(Monaco) JMB Racing					8								8
20=	(Canada) Chris Niarchos	(United Kingdom) CRS Racing	5												5
20=	(France) Michel Mhitarian	(Monaco) JMB Racing					5								5

==== Ford ====
Pos	Driver	Team	Rd 1	Rd 2	Rd 3	Rd 4	Rd 5	Rd 6	Rd 7	Rd 8	Rd 9	Rd 10	Rd 11	Rd 12	Total
1	(Belgium) Eric De Doncker	(Switzerland) Matech GT Racing	8	8	10	8	10	6		6	2.5		5	10	73.5
2=	(Brazil) Walter Salles	(Switzerland) Matech GT Racing			8	10	8	8	6	8	3	10	6		67
2=	(Germany) Thomas Mutsch	(Switzerland) Matech GT Racing			8	10	8	8	6	8	3	10	6		67
4=	(Germany) Florian Gruber	(Germany) Fischer Racing	10	10				10	8		5		8	8	59
4=	(Denmark) Christoffer Nygaard	(Germany) Fischer Racing	10	10				10	8		5				59
6	(France) Dino Lunardi	(Switzerland) Matech GT Racing	8	8	10	8	10	6		6					56
7=	(Germany) Frank Kräling	(Germany) Fischer Racing					6	5			4				15
7=	(Germany) Marc Gindorf	(Germany) Fischer Racing					6	5			4				15
7=	(Germany) Christian Mamerow	(Switzerland) Matech GT Racing											5	10	15
10=	(Germany) Harald Becker	(Germany) Fischer Racing	6												6
10=	(Germany) Christian Hohenadel	(Germany) Fischer Racing	6												6
12	(Switzerland) Jonathan Hirschi	(Switzerland) Matech GT Racing									2.5				2.5

==== Porsche ====
Pos	Driver	Team	Rd 1	Rd 2	Rd 3	Rd 4	Rd 5	Rd 6	Rd 7	Rd 8	Rd 9	Rd 10	Rd 11	Rd 12	Total
1	(Austria) Niki Lanik	(Belgium) Prospeed Competition	6		8	6		6	10	10	4	8		8	66
2	(United Kingdom) David Ashburn	(United Kingdom) Trackspeed	5	6	6	8	8		8	8	3	5			57
3	(Germany) Tim Bergmeister	(Belgium) Mühlner Motorsport	10	10					8	8					36
4=	(United Kingdom) Tim Sugden	(United Kingdom) Trackspeed	5	6	6	8									25
4=	(Czech Republic) Jaromir Jirik	(Belgium) Mühlner Motorsport	10	10		5									25
4=	(Germany) Jürgen Häring	(Belgium) Mühlner Motorsport					6	8	5	6					25
7	(United Kingdom) Sean Edwards	(Belgium) Mühlner Motorsport (United Kingdom) Trackspeed Racing	8	8			8								24
8	(Cyprus) Doros Loucaides	(Belgium) Mühlner Motorsport							6		2.5	6	8		22.5
9=	(Germany) Marco Holzer	(Belgium) Prospeed Competition							10	10					20
9=	(Finland) Mikael Fortsen	(Belgium) Prospeed Competition									4	8		8	20
9=	(Finland) Petri Lappalainen	(Belgium) Mühlner Motorsport											10	10	20
9=	(Finland) Markus Palttala	(Belgium) Mühlner Motorsport											10	10	20
13	(United Kingdom) Oliver Morley	(Belgium) Mühlner Motorsport	8	8											16
14=	(Austria) Johannes Stuck	(Belgium) Mühlner Motorsport									5	10			15
14=	(France) Dino Lunardi	(Belgium) Mühlner Motorsport									5	10			15
16=	(Belgium) Geoffroy Horion	(Belgium) Prospeed Competition			8	6									14
16=	(Germany) Marc Basseng	(Belgium) Mühlner Motorsport					6	8							14
18	(Greece) Dimitri Deverikos	(Belgium) Mühlner Motorsport				5		6							11
19	(France) Christophe Lapierre	(Belgium) Mühlner Motorsport									2.5	6			8.5
20=	(Austria) Martin Ragginger	(United Kingdom) Trackspeed Racing									3	5			8
20=	(Finland) Petri Mannila	(Belgium) Mühlner Motorsport											8		8
22=	(Belgium) Bart Couwberghs	(Belgium) Prospeed Competition	6												6
22=	(France) Gilles Vannelet	(Belgium) Mühlner Motorsport							6						6

== Bibliography ==
- Loisy, Olivier (2009). FIA GT & GT3 European Championship 2009 Yearbook. Paris: Apollo Publishing. ISBN 978-2952104463.
