= 2008 FIA GT3 European Championship =

Seasons
- ← 2007 2009 →

The 2008 FIA GT3 European Championship was the third season of the FIA GT3 European Championship. The season began on 19 April 2008 and ended on 6 December 2008, and featured twelve one-hour races.

Arnaud Peyroles and James Ruffier claimed the drivers' title in what turned out to be the final race of the season at the first round of Dubai. Matech GT Racing claimed the teams' title after dominating the championship, clearing second-place finisher Hexis Racing by 30 points.

== Schedule ==
All races were one hour in length, and served as support races for the FIA GT Championship.

Round	Race	Event	Circuit	Date
1	1	(United Kingdom) Silverstone The RAC Tourist Trophy	Silverstone Circuit	April 19
1	2	(United Kingdom) Silverstone The RAC Tourist Trophy	Silverstone Circuit	April 20
2	3	(Italy) Motors & Music in Monza	Autodromo Nazionale di Monza	May 17
2	4	(Italy) Motors & Music in Monza	Autodromo Nazionale di Monza	May 18
3	5	(Germany) Oschersleben	Motorsport Arena Oschersleben	July 5
3	6	(Germany) Oschersleben	Motorsport Arena Oschersleben	July 6
4	7	(Czech Republic) Brno	Masaryk circuit	September 13
4	8	(Czech Republic) Brno	Masaryk circuit	September 14
5	9	(France) Nogaro	Circuit Paul Armagnac	October 4
5	10	(France) Nogaro	Circuit Paul Armagnac	October 5
6	11	(United Arab Emirates) Dubai Motorsport Festival	Dubai Autodrome	December 5
6	12	(United Arab Emirates) Dubai Motorsport Festival	Dubai Autodrome	December 6

== Entry list ==
Team	Chassis	Engine	No.	Drivers	Rounds
(Germany) Martini Callaway Racing	Corvette Z06.R GT3	Chevrolet LS7 7.0 L V8	1	(France) James Ruffier	All
(Germany) Martini Callaway Racing	Corvette Z06.R GT3	Chevrolet LS7 7.0 L V8	1	(France) Arnaud Peyroles	All
(Germany) Martini Callaway Racing	Corvette Z06.R GT3	Chevrolet LS7 7.0 L V8	2	(Germany) Sascha Bert	2–6
(Germany) Martini Callaway Racing	Corvette Z06.R GT3	Chevrolet LS7 7.0 L V8	2	(Austria) Alois Meir	2–6
(Switzerland) Kessel Racing	Ferrari F430 GT3	Ferrari F136 4.3 L V8	3	(Bulgaria) Plamen Kralev	1–4
(Switzerland) Kessel Racing	Ferrari F430 GT3	Ferrari F136 4.3 L V8	3	(Bulgaria) Dimitar Iliev	1–3
(Switzerland) Kessel Racing	Ferrari F430 GT3	Ferrari F136 4.3 L V8	3	(Italy) Niki Cadei	4, 6
(Switzerland) Kessel Racing	Ferrari F430 GT3	Ferrari F136 4.3 L V8	3	(Russia) Vadim Kuzminykh	5–6
(Switzerland) Kessel Racing	Ferrari F430 GT3	Ferrari F136 4.3 L V8	3	(Switzerland) Loris Kessel	5
(Switzerland) Kessel Racing	Ferrari F430 GT3	Ferrari F136 4.3 L V8	4	(United Kingdom) Paul Warren	All
(Switzerland) Kessel Racing	Ferrari F430 GT3	Ferrari F136 4.3 L V8	4	(United Kingdom) Chris Hyman	1–4, 6
(Switzerland) Kessel Racing	Ferrari F430 GT3	Ferrari F136 4.3 L V8	4	(Switzerland) Henri Moser	5
(Switzerland) Kessel Racing	Ferrari F430 GT3	Ferrari F136 4.3 L V8	5	(Argentina) Jose Manuel Balbiani	1–5
(Switzerland) Kessel Racing	Ferrari F430 GT3	Ferrari F136 4.3 L V8	5	(Italy) Niki Cadei	1, 3
(Switzerland) Kessel Racing	Ferrari F430 GT3	Ferrari F136 4.3 L V8	5	(Brazil) Claudio Ricci	4–5
(Switzerland) Kessel Racing	Ferrari F430 GT3	Ferrari F136 4.3 L V8	5	(Italy) Alessandro Tonoli	2
(Switzerland) Kessel Racing	Ferrari F430 GT3	Ferrari F136 4.3 L V8	5	(Brazil) Fabio Casagrande	6
(United Kingdom) Trackspeed	Porsche 997 GT3 Cup	Porsche M96/75 3.6 L Flat-6	6	(United Kingdom) David Ashburn	All
(United Kingdom) Trackspeed	Porsche 997 GT3 Cup	Porsche M96/75 3.6 L Flat-6	6	(United Kingdom) Richard Williams	All
(United Kingdom) Trackspeed	Porsche 997 GT3 Cup	Porsche M96/75 3.6 L Flat-6	7	(United Kingdom) Philip Nuttall	All
(United Kingdom) Trackspeed	Porsche 997 GT3 Cup	Porsche M96/75 3.6 L Flat-6	7	(United Kingdom) Andrew Shelley	All
(France) Hexis Racing	Aston Martin DBRS9	Aston Martin AM04 5.9 L V12	8	(France) Thomas Accary	All
(France) Hexis Racing	Aston Martin DBRS9	Aston Martin AM04 5.9 L V12	8	(France) Pierre-Brice Mena	All
(France) Hexis Racing	Aston Martin DBRS9	Aston Martin AM04 5.9 L V12	9	(France) Julien Rodrigues	All
(France) Hexis Racing	Aston Martin DBRS9	Aston Martin AM04 5.9 L V12	9	(France) Manuel Rodrigues	All
(France) Hexis Racing	Aston Martin DBRS9	Aston Martin AM04 5.9 L V12	10	(France) Jean-Claude Lagniez	All
(France) Hexis Racing	Aston Martin DBRS9	Aston Martin AM04 5.9 L V12	10	(France) Frédéric Makowiecki	All
(Monaco) JMB Racing	Ferrari F430 GT3	Ferrari F136 4.3 L V8	11	(France) Bruce Lorgere-Roux	1–4
(Monaco) JMB Racing	Ferrari F430 GT3	Ferrari F136 4.3 L V8	11	(France) Michael Petit	1–2
(Monaco) JMB Racing	Ferrari F430 GT3	Ferrari F136 4.3 L V8	11	(France) Pascal Ballay	3, 5
(Monaco) JMB Racing	Ferrari F430 GT3	Ferrari F136 4.3 L V8	11	(United Kingdom) Wesley Fongenie	4
(Monaco) JMB Racing	Ferrari F430 GT3	Ferrari F136 4.3 L V8	11	(France) Jonathan Sicart	5
(Monaco) JMB Racing	Ferrari F430 GT3	Ferrari F136 4.3 L V8	11	(France) Dino Lunardi	6
(Monaco) JMB Racing	Ferrari F430 GT3	Ferrari F136 4.3 L V8	11	(France) Nicolas Misslin	6
(Monaco) JMB Racing	Ferrari F430 GT3	Ferrari F136 4.3 L V8	12	(France) Johan Rambeaud	All
(Monaco) JMB Racing	Ferrari F430 GT3	Ferrari F136 4.3 L V8	12	(France) Nicolas Misslin	1–2
(Monaco) JMB Racing	Ferrari F430 GT3	Ferrari F136 4.3 L V8	12	(France) Nicolas Comar	4, 6
(Monaco) JMB Racing	Ferrari F430 GT3	Ferrari F136 4.3 L V8	12	(Netherlands) Arjan van der Zwaan	3
(Monaco) JMB Racing	Ferrari F430 GT3	Ferrari F136 4.3 L V8	12	(France) Philippe Rambeaud	5
(Monaco) JMB Racing	Ferrari F430 GT3	Ferrari F136 4.3 L V8	13	(France) Michael Petit	3–5
(Monaco) JMB Racing	Ferrari F430 GT3	Ferrari F136 4.3 L V8	13	(France) Pascal Ballay	1–2
(Monaco) JMB Racing	Ferrari F430 GT3	Ferrari F136 4.3 L V8	13	(Italy) Mauro Casadei	1
(Monaco) JMB Racing	Ferrari F430 GT3	Ferrari F136 4.3 L V8	13	(France) Jonathan Sicart	2
(Monaco) JMB Racing	Ferrari F430 GT3	Ferrari F136 4.3 L V8	13	(France) Nicolas Misslin	3
(Monaco) JMB Racing	Ferrari F430 GT3	Ferrari F136 4.3 L V8	13	(France) Philippe Rambeaud	4
(Monaco) JMB Racing	Ferrari F430 GT3	Ferrari F136 4.3 L V8	13	(France) Dino Lunardi	5
(Monaco) JMB Racing	Ferrari F430 GT3	Ferrari F136 4.3 L V8	13	(France) Bruce Lorgere-Roux	6
(Monaco) JMB Racing	Ferrari F430 GT3	Ferrari F136 4.3 L V8	13	(France) Frederic O Neill	6
(Austria) S-Berg Racing Team	Lamborghini Gallardo GT3	Lamborghini 07L1 5.0 L V10	14	(Austria) Dominik Kraihamer	All
(Austria) S-Berg Racing Team	Lamborghini Gallardo GT3	Lamborghini 07L1 5.0 L V10	14	(Austria) Hans Knauss	1–3
(Austria) S-Berg Racing Team	Lamborghini Gallardo GT3	Lamborghini 07L1 5.0 L V10	14	(Netherlands) Dennis Retera	5–6
(Austria) S-Berg Racing Team	Lamborghini Gallardo GT3	Lamborghini 07L1 5.0 L V10	14	(Italy) Luca Polato	4
(Austria) S-Berg Racing Team	Lamborghini Gallardo GT3	Lamborghini 07L1 5.0 L V10	15	(Russia) Vadim Kuzminykh	1–3
(Austria) S-Berg Racing Team	Lamborghini Gallardo GT3	Lamborghini 07L1 5.0 L V10	15	(Italy) Luca Polato	1–3
(Austria) S-Berg Racing Team	Lamborghini Gallardo GT3	Lamborghini 07L1 5.0 L V10	15	(Netherlands) Dennis Retera	4
(Austria) S-Berg Racing Team	Lamborghini Gallardo GT3	Lamborghini 07L1 5.0 L V10	15	(France) Antoine Leclerc	6
(Austria) S-Berg Racing Team	Lamborghini Gallardo GT3	Lamborghini 07L1 5.0 L V10	15	(Netherlands) Marius Ritskes	6
(Italy) Brixia Racing	Aston Martin DBRS9	Aston Martin AM04 5.9 L V12	16	(Italy) Gianmarino Zenere	All
(Italy) Brixia Racing	Aston Martin DBRS9	Aston Martin AM04 5.9 L V12	16	(Italy) Maurizio Fratti	4, 6
(Italy) Brixia Racing	Aston Martin DBRS9	Aston Martin AM04 5.9 L V12	16	(Czech Republic) Jaromir Jirik	1
(Italy) Brixia Racing	Aston Martin DBRS9	Aston Martin AM04 5.9 L V12	16	(Monaco) Philippe Prette	2
(Italy) Brixia Racing	Aston Martin DBRS9	Aston Martin AM04 5.9 L V12	16	(Italy) Riccardo Errani	3
(Italy) Brixia Racing	Aston Martin DBRS9	Aston Martin AM04 5.9 L V12	16	(Italy) Pietro Zumerle	5
(Italy) Brixia Racing	Aston Martin DBRS9	Aston Martin AM04 5.9 L V12	17	(Italy) Marcello Zani	All
(Italy) Brixia Racing	Aston Martin DBRS9	Aston Martin AM04 5.9 L V12	17	(Italy) Gianluca Giraudi	1–3
(Italy) Brixia Racing	Aston Martin DBRS9	Aston Martin AM04 5.9 L V12	17	(Italy) Diego Alessi	4
(Italy) Brixia Racing	Aston Martin DBRS9	Aston Martin AM04 5.9 L V12	17	(Italy) Giuseppe Ciro	5
(Italy) Brixia Racing	Aston Martin DBRS9	Aston Martin AM04 5.9 L V12	17	(Italy) Alex Frassinetti	6
(Italy) Brixia Racing	Aston Martin DBRS9	Aston Martin AM04 5.9 L V12	18	(Italy) Massimo Mantovani	1–4, 6
(Italy) Brixia Racing	Aston Martin DBRS9	Aston Martin AM04 5.9 L V12	18	(Italy) Pietro Zumerle	1–4, 6
(Switzerland) Matech GT Racing	Ford GT GT3	Ford 5.0 L Supercharged V8	19	(Germany) Juergen von Gartzen	All
(Switzerland) Matech GT Racing	Ford GT GT3	Ford 5.0 L Supercharged V8	19	(Italy) Luca Pirri	All
(Switzerland) Matech GT Racing	Ford GT GT3	Ford 5.0 L Supercharged V8	20	(United Kingdom) Ian Khan	All
(Switzerland) Matech GT Racing	Ford GT GT3	Ford 5.0 L Supercharged V8	20	(Germany) Thomas Mutsch	All
(Switzerland) Matech GT Racing	Ford GT GT3	Ford 5.0 L Supercharged V8	21	(United Kingdom) Bradley Ellis	All
(Switzerland) Matech GT Racing	Ford GT GT3	Ford 5.0 L Supercharged V8	21	(United Kingdom) Alex Mortimer	2–6
(Switzerland) Matech GT Racing	Ford GT GT3	Ford 5.0 L Supercharged V8	21	(United Kingdom) Edward Morris	1
(Switzerland) Matech GT Racing	Ford GT GT3	Ford 5.0 L Supercharged V8	50	(Switzerland) Eric La Marca	6
(Switzerland) Matech GT Racing	Ford GT GT3	Ford 5.0 L Supercharged V8	50	(Switzerland) Lloyd La Marca	6
(Switzerland) Matech Mustang Racing	Ford Mustang FR500 GT	Ford Cammer 5.0 L V8	22	(Belgium) Eric de Doncker	1–4
(Switzerland) Matech Mustang Racing	Ford Mustang FR500 GT	Ford Cammer 5.0 L V8	22	(Canada) Scott Maxwell	1–2, 4
(Switzerland) Matech Mustang Racing	Ford Mustang FR500 GT	Ford Cammer 5.0 L V8	22	(United States) Gunnar Jeannette	3
(Switzerland) Matech Mustang Racing	Ford Mustang FR500 GT	Ford Cammer 5.0 L V8	23	(Canada) John Graham	2–3
(Switzerland) Matech Mustang Racing	Ford Mustang FR500 GT	Ford Cammer 5.0 L V8	23	(France) Thierry Blaise	1
(Switzerland) Matech Mustang Racing	Ford Mustang FR500 GT	Ford Cammer 5.0 L V8	23	(United Kingdom) Nigel Greensall	1
(Switzerland) Matech Mustang Racing	Ford Mustang FR500 GT	Ford Cammer 5.0 L V8	23	(Cyprus) Christos Peyiazis	2
(Switzerland) Matech Mustang Racing	Ford Mustang FR500 GT	Ford Cammer 5.0 L V8	23	(France) Romain Bera	3
(Switzerland) Matech Mustang Racing	Ford Mustang FR500 GT	Ford Cammer 5.0 L V8	24	(France) Romain Bera	1, 4
(Switzerland) Matech Mustang Racing	Ford Mustang FR500 GT	Ford Cammer 5.0 L V8	24	(Belgium) Ron Marshal	1
(Switzerland) Matech Mustang Racing	Ford Mustang FR500 GT	Ford Cammer 5.0 L V8	24	(Canada) John Graham	4
(United Kingdom) Team Berlanga	Ascari KZ1R	BMW S62 4.9 L V8	25	(United Kingdom) Erik Zwart	1–3, 6
(United Kingdom) Team Berlanga	Ascari KZ1R	BMW S62 4.9 L V8	25	(United Kingdom) Chris Dymond	1–2
(United Kingdom) Team Berlanga	Ascari KZ1R	BMW S62 4.9 L V8	25	(United Kingdom) Michael Greenhalgh	3–4
(United Kingdom) Team Berlanga	Ascari KZ1R	BMW S62 4.9 L V8	25	(United Kingdom) Jonathan Lang	4
(United Kingdom) Team Berlanga	Ascari KZ1R	BMW S62 4.9 L V8	25	(United Kingdom) Martin Rich	6
(United Kingdom) Team Berlanga	Ascari KZ1R	BMW S62 4.9 L V8	26	(United Kingdom) Martin Rich	1–4
(United Kingdom) Team Berlanga	Ascari KZ1R	BMW S62 4.9 L V8	26	(United Kingdom) Andrew Thompson	1–3
(United Kingdom) Team Berlanga	Ascari KZ1R	BMW S62 4.9 L V8	26	(Austria) Ingo Gerstl	4
(United Kingdom) Team Berlanga	Ascari KZ1R	BMW S62 4.9 L V8	26	(United Kingdom) Michael Greenhalgh	6
(United Kingdom) Team Berlanga	Ascari KZ1R	BMW S62 4.9 L V8	26	(United Kingdom) Jonathan Lang	6
(France) Marc Sourd Racing	Corvette Z06.R GT3	Chevrolet LS7 7.0 L V8	27	(Czech Republic) Michael Vorba	4
(France) Marc Sourd Racing	Corvette Z06.R GT3	Chevrolet LS7 7.0 L V8	27	(Italy) Alessandro Tonoli	4
(France) Marc Sourd Racing	Corvette Z06.R GT3	Chevrolet LS7 7.0 L V8	27	(France) Laurent Cazenave	5
(France) Marc Sourd Racing	Corvette Z06.R GT3	Chevrolet LS7 7.0 L V8	27	(France) Frederic Depresle	5
(France) Marc Sourd Racing	Corvette Z06.R GT3	Chevrolet LS7 7.0 L V8	28	(France) Marc Sourd	All
(France) Marc Sourd Racing	Corvette Z06.R GT3	Chevrolet LS7 7.0 L V8	28	(France) Johan Charpilienne	2–4
(France) Marc Sourd Racing	Corvette Z06.R GT3	Chevrolet LS7 7.0 L V8	28	(France) Gilles Vannelet	5–6
(France) Marc Sourd Racing	Corvette Z06.R GT3	Chevrolet LS7 7.0 L V8	28	(France) Stephane Lacroix-Wasover	1
(France) AutoGt Racing	Morgan Aero 8	BMW S50LA 4.9 L V8	29	(France) Gael Lesoudier	All
(France) AutoGt Racing	Morgan Aero 8	BMW S50LA 4.9 L V8	29	(France) Johan-Boris Scheier	All
(France) AutoGt Racing	Morgan Aero 8	BMW S50LA 4.9 L V8	30	(France) Frédéric O'Neill	1–5
(France) AutoGt Racing	Morgan Aero 8	BMW S50LA 4.9 L V8	30	(France) Jacques Laffite	1–2, 5
(France) AutoGt Racing	Morgan Aero 8	BMW S50LA 4.9 L V8	30	(United Kingdom) Charles Morgan	3–4
(France) AutoGt Racing	Morgan Aero 8	BMW S50LA 4.9 L V8	31	(France) Marguerite Laffite	All
(France) AutoGt Racing	Morgan Aero 8	BMW S50LA 4.9 L V8	31	(France) Georges-Alexandre Sturdza	1–5
(France) AutoGt Racing	Morgan Aero 8	BMW S50LA 4.9 L V8	31	(Belgium) Maxime Martin	6
(United Kingdom) Apex Motorsport	Jaguar XKR-S GT3	Jaguar AJ34S 4.2 L Supercharged V8	32	(United States) Robert Hissom	1, 3–6
(United Kingdom) Apex Motorsport	Jaguar XKR-S GT3	Jaguar AJ34S 4.2 L Supercharged V8	32	(United Kingdom) Ben Clucas	1, 3–5
(United Kingdom) Apex Motorsport	Jaguar XKR-S GT3	Jaguar AJ34S 4.2 L Supercharged V8	32	(United Kingdom) Phil Quaife	6
(United Kingdom) Apex Motorsport	Jaguar XKR-S GT3	Jaguar AJ34S 4.2 L Supercharged V8	33	(United Kingdom) Stuart Hall	1–3, 6
(United Kingdom) Apex Motorsport	Jaguar XKR-S GT3	Jaguar AJ34S 4.2 L Supercharged V8	33	(United Kingdom) Phil Quaife	1, 3–5
(United Kingdom) Apex Motorsport	Jaguar XKR-S GT3	Jaguar AJ34S 4.2 L Supercharged V8	33	(United Kingdom) Chris Dymond	4–6
(United Kingdom) Apex Motorsport	Jaguar XKR-S GT3	Jaguar AJ34S 4.2 L Supercharged V8	33	(United Kingdom) Ray Bellm	2
(Belgium) Prospeed Competition	Porsche 997 GT3 Cup	Porsche M97/75 3.6 L Flat-6	35	(Belgium) Rudi Penders	All
(Belgium) Prospeed Competition	Porsche 997 GT3 Cup	Porsche M97/75 3.6 L Flat-6	35	(Belgium) Franz Lamot	1–3, 5–6
(Belgium) Prospeed Competition	Porsche 997 GT3 Cup	Porsche M97/75 3.6 L Flat-6	35	(Finland) Mikael Forsten	4
(Belgium) Prospeed Competition	Porsche 997 GT3 Cup	Porsche M97/75 3.6 L Flat-6	36	(Belgium) David Loix	All
(Belgium) Prospeed Competition	Porsche 997 GT3 Cup	Porsche M97/75 3.6 L Flat-6	36	(Belgium) Stéphane Lémeret	2–4, 5–6
(Belgium) Prospeed Competition	Porsche 997 GT3 Cup	Porsche M97/75 3.6 L Flat-6	36	(Finland) Mikael Forsten	1
(Czech Republic) MM-Racing	Corvette Z06.R GT3	Chevrolet LS7 7.0 L V8	37	(Czech Republic) Adam Lacko	4–6
(Czech Republic) MM-Racing	Corvette Z06.R GT3	Chevrolet LS7 7.0 L V8	37	(Czech Republic) Stepan Vojtech	4–6
(Czech Republic) MM-Racing	Corvette Z06.R GT3	Chevrolet LS7 7.0 L V8	37	(Czech Republic) Martin Matzke	1–2
(Czech Republic) MM-Racing	Corvette Z06.R GT3	Chevrolet LS7 7.0 L V8	37	(Czech Republic) Jiri Skula	1–2
(Czech Republic) MM-Racing	Corvette Z06.R GT3	Chevrolet LS7 7.0 L V8	37	(Czech Republic) Vladimir Hladík	3
(Czech Republic) MM-Racing	Corvette Z06.R GT3	Chevrolet LS7 7.0 L V8	37	(Czech Republic) Michael Vorba	3
(Czech Republic) MM-Racing	Corvette Z06.R GT3	Chevrolet LS7 7.0 L V8	38	(Czech Republic) Martin Matzke	3–6
(Czech Republic) MM-Racing	Corvette Z06.R GT3	Chevrolet LS7 7.0 L V8	38	(Czech Republic) Jiri Skula	3–6
(Belgium) Mühlner Motorsport	Porsche 997 GT3 Cup	Porsche M96/75 3.6 L Flat-6	39	(Canada) Mark Thomas	All
(Belgium) Mühlner Motorsport	Porsche 997 GT3 Cup	Porsche M96/75 3.6 L Flat-6	39	(Czech Republic) Jaromir Jirik	2–4
(Belgium) Mühlner Motorsport	Porsche 997 GT3 Cup	Porsche M96/75 3.6 L Flat-6	39	(Germany) Jochen Krumbach	1
(Belgium) Mühlner Motorsport	Porsche 997 GT3 Cup	Porsche M96/75 3.6 L Flat-6	39	(Belgium) Jean-Francois Hemroulle	5
(Belgium) Mühlner Motorsport	Porsche 997 GT3 Cup	Porsche M96/75 3.6 L Flat-6	39	(Germany) Frank Schmickler	6
(Belgium) Mühlner Motorsport	Porsche 997 GT3 Cup	Porsche M96/75 3.6 L Flat-6	40	(Germany) Tim Bergmeister	1–3
(Belgium) Mühlner Motorsport	Porsche 997 GT3 Cup	Porsche M96/75 3.6 L Flat-6	40	(Belgium) Tom Cloet	1–3
(Belgium) Mühlner Motorsport	Porsche 997 GT3 Cup	Porsche M96/75 3.6 L Flat-6	40	(Czech Republic) Jaromir Jirik	5–6
(Belgium) Mühlner Motorsport	Porsche 997 GT3 Cup	Porsche M96/75 3.6 L Flat-6	40	(Belgium) Vincent Vosse	5
(Belgium) Mühlner Motorsport	Porsche 997 GT3 Cup	Porsche M96/75 3.6 L Flat-6	40	(Germany) Marc Basseng	6
(Italy) La Torre Motorsport	Dodge Viper Competition Coupe	Dodge Viper 8.3 L V10	41	(Italy) Elio Marchetti	1–3, 5
(Italy) La Torre Motorsport	Dodge Viper Competition Coupe	Dodge Viper 8.3 L V10	41	(Italy) Riccardo Romagnoli	1–3, 5
(Italy) La Torre Motorsport	Dodge Viper Competition Coupe	Dodge Viper 8.3 L V10	41	(Italy) Gabriele Sabatini	4
(Italy) La Torre Motorsport	Dodge Viper Competition Coupe	Dodge Viper 8.3 L V10	41	(Italy) Filippo Zadotti	4
(Italy) La Torre Motorsport	Dodge Viper Competition Coupe	Dodge Viper 8.3 L V10	42	(Italy) Gabriele Sabatini	1–3, 5
(Italy) La Torre Motorsport	Dodge Viper Competition Coupe	Dodge Viper 8.3 L V10	42	(Italy) Filippo Mancini	1–2
(Italy) La Torre Motorsport	Dodge Viper Competition Coupe	Dodge Viper 8.3 L V10	42	(Italy) Giuseppe de Pasquale	3
(Italy) La Torre Motorsport	Dodge Viper Competition Coupe	Dodge Viper 8.3 L V10	42	(Italy) Filippo Zadotti	5
(Italy) La Torre Motorsport	Dodge Viper Competition Coupe	Dodge Viper 8.3 L V10	43	(France) Dino Lunardi	1–4
(Italy) La Torre Motorsport	Dodge Viper Competition Coupe	Dodge Viper 8.3 L V10	43	(France) Gilles Vannelet	1–4
(Belgium) Gravity Racing International	Ascari KZ1R	BMW S62 4.9 L V8	44	(United Kingdom) Michael Greenhalgh	1–2
(Belgium) Gravity Racing International	Ascari KZ1R	BMW S62 4.9 L V8	44	(Belgium) Jérôme Thiry	2, 4
(Belgium) Gravity Racing International	Ascari KZ1R	BMW S62 4.9 L V8	44	(Belgium) Stéphane Lémeret	1
(Belgium) Gravity Racing International	Ascari KZ1R	BMW S62 4.9 L V8	44	(Belgium) Maxime Martin	4
(Belgium) Gravity Racing International	Ascari KZ1R	BMW S62 4.9 L V8	45	(Italy) Ettore Bonaldi	2, 4
(Belgium) Gravity Racing International	Ascari KZ1R	BMW S62 4.9 L V8	45	(Italy) Gian Maria Gabbiani	2, 4
(Belgium) Gravity Racing International	Ascari KZ1R	BMW S62 4.9 L V8	45	(United Kingdom) Jonathan Lang	1
(Belgium) Gravity Racing International	Ascari KZ1R	BMW S62 4.9 L V8	45	(United Kingdom) Howard Spooner	1
(United Kingdom) Tech 9 Motorsport	Lamborghini Gallardo GT3	Lamborghini 07L1 5.0 L V10	46	(Italy) Maurizio Fabris	1, 3–6
(United Kingdom) Tech 9 Motorsport	Lamborghini Gallardo GT3	Lamborghini 07L1 5.0 L V10	46	(Italy) Antonio Andolfato	4, 6
(United Kingdom) Tech 9 Motorsport	Lamborghini Gallardo GT3	Lamborghini 07L1 5.0 L V10	46	(United Kingdom) Tom Ferrier	1
(United Kingdom) Tech 9 Motorsport	Lamborghini Gallardo GT3	Lamborghini 07L1 5.0 L V10	46	(Switzerland) Max Cattori	3
(United Kingdom) Tech 9 Motorsport	Lamborghini Gallardo GT3	Lamborghini 07L1 5.0 L V10	46	(United Kingdom) Joe Macari	5
(United Kingdom) Tech 9 Motorsport	Lamborghini Gallardo GT3	Lamborghini 07L1 5.0 L V10	47	(Greece) Dimitris Deverikos	2, 4
(United Kingdom) Tech 9 Motorsport	Lamborghini Gallardo GT3	Lamborghini 07L1 5.0 L V10	47	(Germany) Christopher Hasse	2–3
(United Kingdom) Tech 9 Motorsport	Lamborghini Gallardo GT3	Lamborghini 07L1 5.0 L V10	47	(Netherlands) Dennis Retera	1
(United Kingdom) Tech 9 Motorsport	Lamborghini Gallardo GT3	Lamborghini 07L1 5.0 L V10	47	(Netherlands) Marius Ritskes	1
(United Kingdom) Tech 9 Motorsport	Lamborghini Gallardo GT3	Lamborghini 07L1 5.0 L V10	47	(Germany) Albert von Thurn und Taxis	3
(United Kingdom) Tech 9 Motorsport	Lamborghini Gallardo GT3	Lamborghini 07L1 5.0 L V10	47	(Czech Republic) Ales Jirasek	4

== Season results ==
Race	Circuit	Pole Position	Winning Drivers	Ref.
1	Silverstone	(Belgium) #36 Prospeed Competition	(Switzerland) #20 Matech GT Racing	
1	Silverstone	(Finland) Mikael Forsten	(Germany) Thomas Mutsch (United Kingdom) Ian Khan	
2	Silverstone	(Switzerland) #20 Matech GT Racing	(Switzerland) #20 Matech GT Racing	
2	Silverstone	(Germany) Thomas Mutsch	(Germany) Thomas Mutsch (United Kingdom) Ian Khan	
3	Monza	(France) #1 Marc Sourd Racing	(Switzerland) #21 Matech GT Racing	
3	Monza	(France) Johan Charpilienne	(United Kingdom) Bradley Ellis (United Kingdom) Alex Mortimer	
4	Monza	(Switzerland) #20 Matech GT Racing	(Switzerland) #21 Matech GT Racing	
4	Monza	(Germany) Thomas Mutsch	(United Kingdom) Bradley Ellis (United Kingdom) Alex Mortimer	
5	Oschersleben	(United Kingdom) #47 Tech 9 Motorsport	(Switzerland) #19 Matech GT Racing	
5	Oschersleben	(Germany) Christopher Haase	(Italy) Luca Pirri (Germany) Juergen von Gartzen	
6	Oschersleben	(Switzerland) #20 Matech GT Racing	(Czech Republic) #38 MM-Racing	
6	Oschersleben	(Germany) Thomas Mutsch	(Czech Republic) Martin Matzke (Czech Republic) Jiri Skula	
7	Brno	(France) #8 Hexis Racing	(Italy) #17 Brixia Racing	
7	Brno	(France) Thomas Accary	(Italy) Marcello Zani (Italy) Diego Alessi	
8	Brno	(Switzerland) #20 Matech GT Racing	(Switzerland) #20 Matech GT Racing	
8	Brno	(Germany) Thomas Mutsch	(Germany) Thomas Mutsch (United Kingdom) Ian Khan	
9	Nogaro	(France) #8 Hexis Racing	(France) #8 Hexis Racing	
9	Nogaro	(France) Thomas Accary	(France) Thomas Accary (France) Pierre-Brice Mena	
10	Nogaro	(Germany) #1 Martini Callaway Racing	(Germany) #1 Martini Callaway Racing	
10	Nogaro	(France) James Ruffier	(France) James Ruffier (France) Arnaud Peyroles	
11	Dubai	(Switzerland) #21 Matech GT Racing	(Germany) #1 Martini Callaway Racing	
11	Dubai	(United Kingdom) Bradley Ellis	(France) James Ruffier (France) Arnaud Peyroles	
12	Dubai	(Germany) #1 Martini Callaway Racing	Race cancelled	
12	Dubai	(France) James Ruffier	Race cancelled	

== Championships ==
Points are awarded to the top eight finishers in the order 10-8-6-5-4-3-2-1. Cars that failed to complete 75% of the winner's distance are awarded half the points awarded for completing the 75% race distance.

=== Drivers' Championship (top 5) ===
Pos	Drivers	Team	SIL (United Kingdom)		MON (Italy)		OSC (Germany)		BRN (Czech Republic)		NOG (France)		DUB (United Arab Emirates)		Total
Pos	Drivers	Team	R1	R2	R1	R2	R1	R2	R1	R2	R1	R2	R1	R2	Total
1	(France) James Ruffier (France) Arnaud Peyroles	(Germany) Martini Callaway Racing	7	2	3	2	10	4	4	NC	27	1	1	C	54
2	(France) Thomas Accary (France) Pierre-Brice Mena	(France) Hexis Racing	14	NC	5	13	2	NC	9	2	1	4	2	C	43
3	(United Kingdom) Ian Khan (Germany) Thomas Mutsch	(Switzerland) Matech GT Racing	1	1	NC	3	NC	21	10	1	26	27	4	C	41
4	(United Kingdom) Bradley Ellis	(Switzerland) Matech GT Racing	11	7	1	1		17	NC	7	4	3	3	C	41
5	(United Kingdom) Alex Mortimer	(Switzerland) Matech GT Racing			1	1		17	NC	7	4	3	3	C	39
Pos	Car	Team	SIL (United Kingdom)		MON (Italy)		OSC (Germany)		BRN (Czech Republic)		NOG (France)		DUB (United Arab Emirates)		Total

=== Teams' Championship ===
Pos	Team	Car	Engine	SIL (United Kingdom)		MON (Italy)		OSC (Germany)		BRN (Czech Republic)		NOG (France)		DUB (United Arab Emirates)		Total
Pos	Team	Car	Engine	R1	R2	R1	R2	R1	R2	R1	R2	R1	R2	R1	R2	Total
1	(Switzerland) Matech GT Racing	Ford GT GT3	Ford 5.0 L Supercharged V8	10	13	10	16	10			12	13	6	12	C	102
2	(France) Hexis Racing	Aston Martin DBRS9	Aston Martin AM04 5.9 L V12		1	5	5	8	2	10	13	13	7	8	C	72
3	(Germany) Martini Callaway Racing	Corvette Z06.R GT3	Chevrolet LS7 7.0 L V8			6	8	2	5	8	6		10	10	C	55
4	(Czech Republic) MM-Racing	Corvette Z06.R GT3	Chevrolet LS7 7.0 L V8					3	10	10	3	1		3	C	30
5	(Italy) La Torre Motorsport	Dodge Viper Competition Coupe	Dodge Viper 8.3 L V10	2	5		4	1	14						C	26
6	(France) AutoGt Racing	Morgan Aero 8	BMW S50LA 4.9 L V8		6	5					4		8		C	23
7	(Switzerland) Kessel Racing	Ferrari F430 GT3	Ferrari F136 4.3 L V8	5	4	2	3		3		1		3		C	21
8	(Italy) Brixia Racing	Aston Martin DBRS9	Aston Martin AM04 5.9 L V12	6						10				4	C	20
9	(Belgium) Prospeed Competition	Porsche 997 GT3 Cup	Porsche M97/75 3.6 L Flat-6	8	8							2			C	18
10	(United Kingdom) Tech 9 Motorsport	Lamborghini Gallardo GT3	Lamborghini 07L1 5.0 L V10	3		8		5							C	16
11=	(United Kingdom) Team Berlanga	Ascari KZ1R	BMW S62 4.9 L V8	1				10							C	11
11=	(Monaco) JMB Racing	Ferrari F430 GT3	Ferrari F136 4.3 L V8		2	3						6			C	11
12	(France) Marc Sourd Racing	Corvette Z06.R GT3	Chevrolet LS7 7.0 L V8						4			4			C	8
13	(Belgium) Mühlner Motorsport	Porsche 997 GT3 Cup	Porsche M96/75 3.6 L Flat-6						1				4	2	C	7
14=	(United Kingdom) Apex Motorsport	Jaguar XKR-S GT3	Jaguar AJ34S 4.2 L Supercharged V8	4											C	4
14=	(United Kingdom) Trackspeed	Porsche 997 GT3 Cup	Porsche M96/75 3.6 L Flat-6				2			1			1		C	4
15	(France) Gravity Racing Team	Ascari KZ1R	BMW S62 4.9 L V8				1								C	1
Pos	Team	Car	Engine	SIL (United Kingdom)		MON (Italy)		OSC (Germany)		BRN (Czech Republic)		NOG (France)		DUB (United Arab Emirates)		Total

== Bibliography ==
- Loisy, Olivier (2008). FIA GT & GT3 European Championship 2008 Yearbook. Paris: Apollo Publishing. ISBN 978-2952104425.
