= 2007 FIA GT3 European Championship =

European car racing season

Seasons
- ← 2006 2008 →

The 2007 FIA GT3 European Championship season was second season of the FIA GT3 European Championship. The season began on 6 May 2007, ended on 17 November 2007 and featured ten one-hour races over five rounds.

== Schedule ==
Most races were one hour in length, and served as support races for the FIA GT Championship.

Rnd	Event	Circuit	Date
1	(United Kingdom) Silverstone The RAC Tourist Trophy	Silverstone Circuit	May 5
2	(United Kingdom) Silverstone The RAC Tourist Trophy	Silverstone Circuit	May 6
3	(Romania) Vodafone Bucharest Challenge	Bucharest Ring	May 19
4	(Romania) Vodafone Bucharest Challenge	Bucharest Ring	May 20
5	(Italy) Motors & Music in Monza	Autodromo Nazionale di Monza	June 23
6	(Italy) Motors & Music in Monza	Autodromo Nazionale di Monza	June 24
7	(Czech Republic) FIA GT Championship & Podzimní cena Brna	Masaryk circuit	September 22
8	(Czech Republic) FIA GT Championship & Podzimní cena Brna	Masaryk circuit	September 23
9	(United Arab Emirates) Dubai Motorsport Festival	Dubai Autodrome	November 16
10	(United Arab Emirates) Dubai Motorsport Festival	Dubai Autodrome	November 17

== Season results ==
Rnd	Circuit	Race 1 Winning Team	Race 2 Winning Team
Rnd	Circuit	Race 1 Winning Drivers	Race 2 Winning Drivers
1 2	Silverstone	(Switzerland) #38 Kessel Racing	(Switzerland) #38 Kessel Racing
1 2	Silverstone	(Switzerland) Henri Moser (France) Gilles Vannelet	(Switzerland) Henri Moser (France) Gilles Vannelet
3 4	Bucharest	(Switzerland) #44 Matech Racing	(Monaco) #34 JMB Racing
3 4	Bucharest	(France) Romain Bera (Belgium) Stefan van Campenhou	(France) Stephane Daoudi (United Kingdom) Ian Khan
5 6	Monza	(Germany) #18 Martini Callaway Racing	(Switzerland) #38 Kessel Racing
5 6	Monza	(Italy) Luca Pirri (Germany) Jürgen von Gartzen	(Switzerland) Henri Moser (France) Gilles Vannelet
7 8	Brno	(France) #19 Riverside	(Germany) #18 Martini Callaway Racing
7 8	Brno	(France) James Ruffier (France) Arnaud Peyroles	(Italy) Luca Pirri (Germany) Jürgen von Gartzen
9 10	Dubai	(Italy) #23 BMS Scuderia Italia	(United Kingdom) #18 Martini Callaway Racing
9 10	Dubai	(Italy) Diego Alessi (Italy) Alex Frassinetti	(Italy) Luca Pirri (Germany) Jürgen von Gartzen

== Championships ==
=== Teams Championship ===
Pos	Team	Car	Engine	Rd 1	Rd 2	Rd 3	Rd 4	Rd 5	Rd 6	Rd 7	Rd 8	Rd 9	Rd 10	Total
1	(Germany) Martini Callaway Racing	Corvette Z06.R GT3	Chevrolet LS7 7.0 L V8	8				10		15	17	16	6	72
2	(Switzerland) Kessel Racing	Ferrari F430 GT3	Ferrari F136 4.3 L V8	10	10	8	2		11	8	6	8	8	71
3	(Italy) BMS Scuderia Italia	Aston Martin DBRS9	Aston Martin AM04 6.0 L V12		9	4		7	13			5	10	48
4	(United Kingdom) Trackspeed Racing	Porsche 997 GT3 Cup	Porsche M97/76 3.6 L Flat-6		2	4	16	5						27
5=	(Monaco) JMB Racing Ferrari	Ferrari F430 GT3	Ferrari F136 4.3 L V8		3	10	4			1		3	4	25
5=	(France) Hexis Racing	Aston Martin DBRS9	Aston Martin AM04 6.0 L V12	6	1			2	5	2	2	5	2	25
6	(Austria) S-Berg Racing	Lamborghini Gallardo GT3	Lamborghini 5.0 L V10		8					6	8	2		24
7	(United Kingdom) RPM	Dodge Viper Competition Coupe	Dodge Viper 8.3 L V10	1		5		8	8		1			23
8	(Switzerland) Matech GT Racing	Ford GT GT3	Ford Cammer 5.0 L V8							7	5		9	21
9	(France) First Racing	Lamborghini Gallardo GT3	Lamborghini 5.0 L V10	4	6	6	3							19
10	(United Kingdom) Tech 9 Motorsport	Lamborghini Gallardo GT3	Lamborghini 5.0 L V10			2	8	3	2					15
11	(United Kingdom) Damax	Ascari KZ1-R	BMW S62 5.0 L V8	5				4						9
12	(United Kingdom) Team Berlanga	Ascari KZ1-R	BMW S62 5.0 L V8	3			5							8
13	(France) Riverside	Corvette Z06.R GT3	Chevrolet LS7 7.0 L V8	2			1							3

== Bibliography ==
- Loisy, Olivier (2007). FIA GT & GT3 European Championship 2007 Yearbook. Paris: Apollo Publishing. ISBN 978-2952104456.
