= Dino Lunardi =

French racing driver (born 1978)

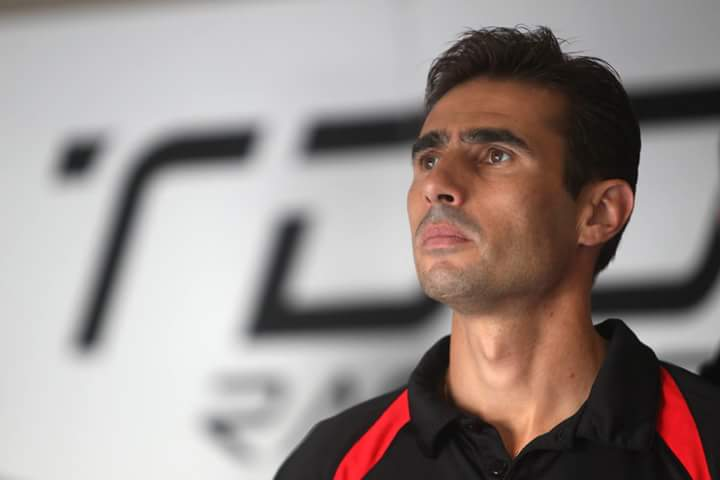
- Lunardi in 2015
- Nationality: (France) French
- Born: 25 October 1978 (age 48) Nîmes, France
- Categorisation: FIA Gold (until 2015, 2022–); FIA Silver (2016–2021)

Championship titles
- 2015 2011 2007 2006: European Le Mans Series – GTC; ADAC GT Masters; THP Spider Cup; Peugeot RC Cup

Dino Lunardi (born 25 October 1978) is a French racing driver who last competed in the Le Mans Cup's LMP3 class for IDEC Sport.

== Career ==
Lunardi began his racing career in 2003, competing in Formula Ford France. After not racing in 2004, Lunardi began racing in the Peugeot RC Cup in 2005, finishing runner-up in his maiden season, before winning the title the following year. In 2007, Lunardi raced in the THP Spider Cup for RBA Sport, winning the title at season's end and earning a test drive in a Peugeot 908 HDi FAP.

Stepping up to GT3 competition in 2008, Lunardi raced a Dodge Viper for La Torre Motorsport in the first four rounds of the FIA GT3 European Championship, taking a best result of third in race two at Oschersleben. Switching to Ferrari outfit JMB Racing for the final two rounds, Lunardi matched his season-best result of third in race one at Nogaro en route to an eighth-place points finish. Remaining in the series for 2009, Lunardi raced in the first four rounds for Ford-affiliated Matech GT Racing, taking a win at Adria and a podium at Oschersleben to end the year 11th in points. The following year, Lunardi primarily raced an Audi R8 LMS in the FFSA GT Championship for Saintéloc – Phoenix Racing, taking a lone win at Albi to round out the year tenth in points. During 2010, Lunardi also raced in the first four rounds of the FIA GT3 European Championship for Toni Seiler Racing, in which he scored a best result of second at Silverstone.

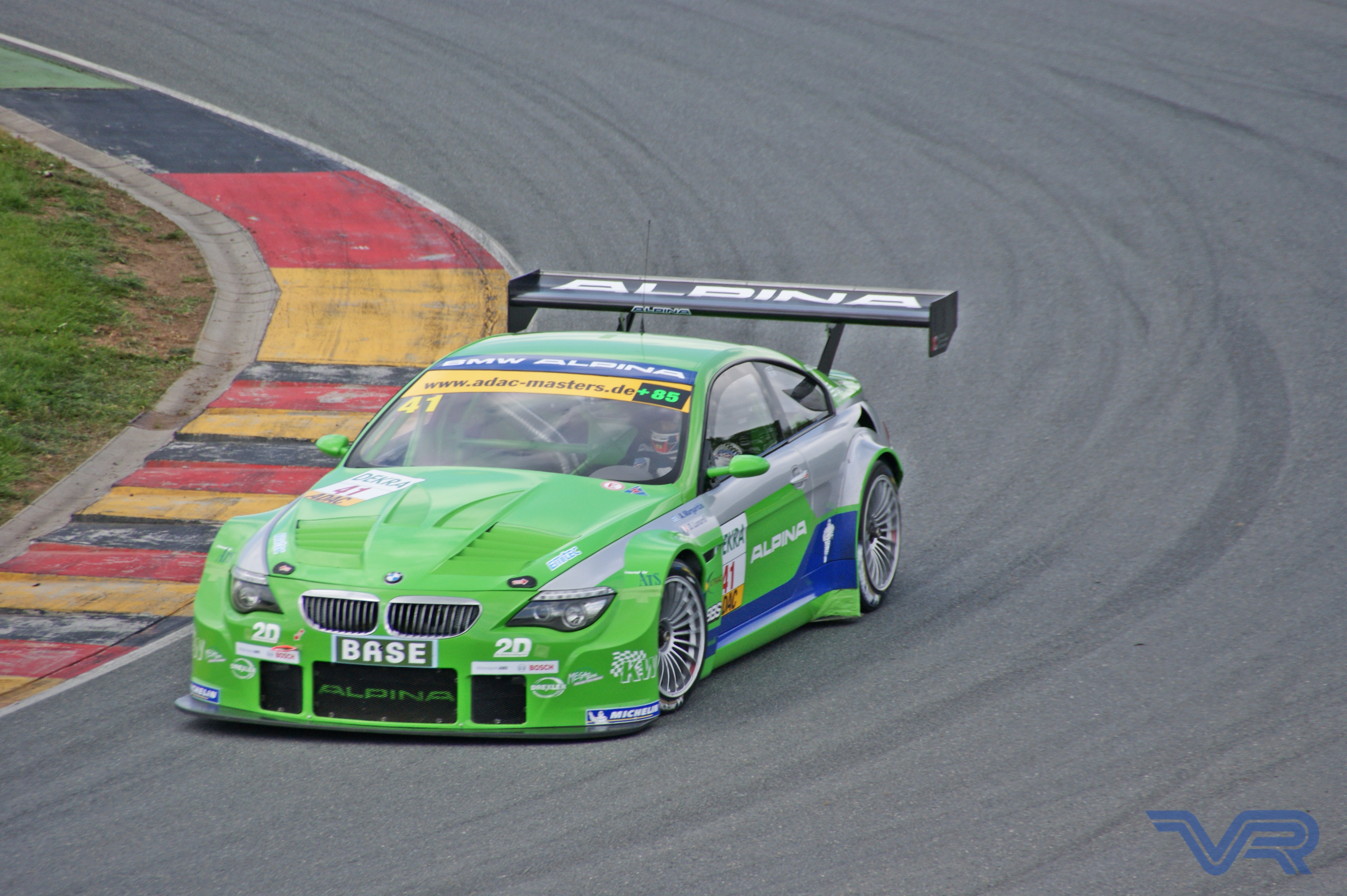
Lunardi helped steer Engstler's BMW Alpina B6 GT3 to the 2011 ADAC GT Masters crown.

Joining Liqui Moly Team Engstler for the 2011 ADAC GT Masters season, Lunardi and teammate Alexandros Margaritis began the year by taking wins at Oschersleben and Zolder, before repeating at Assen and Hockenheimring to secure the title at season's end. In parallel, Lunardi also raced in the FIA GT3 European Championship for Saintéloc Racing, in which he took a best result of third at Le Castellet in race one. Continuing with the Alpina brand for the 2012 ADAC GT Masters season, Lunardi won the season-opening race at Oschersleben, before taking two wins at the Nürburgring en route to a fourth-place points finish. During 2012, Lunardi also raced for Saintéloc Racing in select rounds of the FIA GT3 European Championship, French GT Championship and the Blancpain Endurance Series. In 2013, Lunardi primarily raced in the French GT Championship for Team Speed Car, winning race one at Spa and both races at Magny-Cours to end the year fourth in points.

After not racing in 2014, Lunardi joined TDS Racing to compete in the GTC class of the 2015 European Le Mans Series, sharing a BMW Z4 GT3 with Eric Dermont and Franck Perera. In his first season in the series, Lunardi won the season-opening race at Silverstone, before winning at Le Castellet and taking two other podiums to seal the GTC title at Estoril. The following year, Lunardi joined Duqueine Engineering to race in the series' LMP3 class alongside David Hallyday, and was later joined by David Droux from Imola onwards. The trio originally won on track at the Red Bull Ring, but were later demoted to second after not respecting the minimum pit stop time. Their season-best result was matched a race later at Le Castellet, which helped them end the year fourth in points.

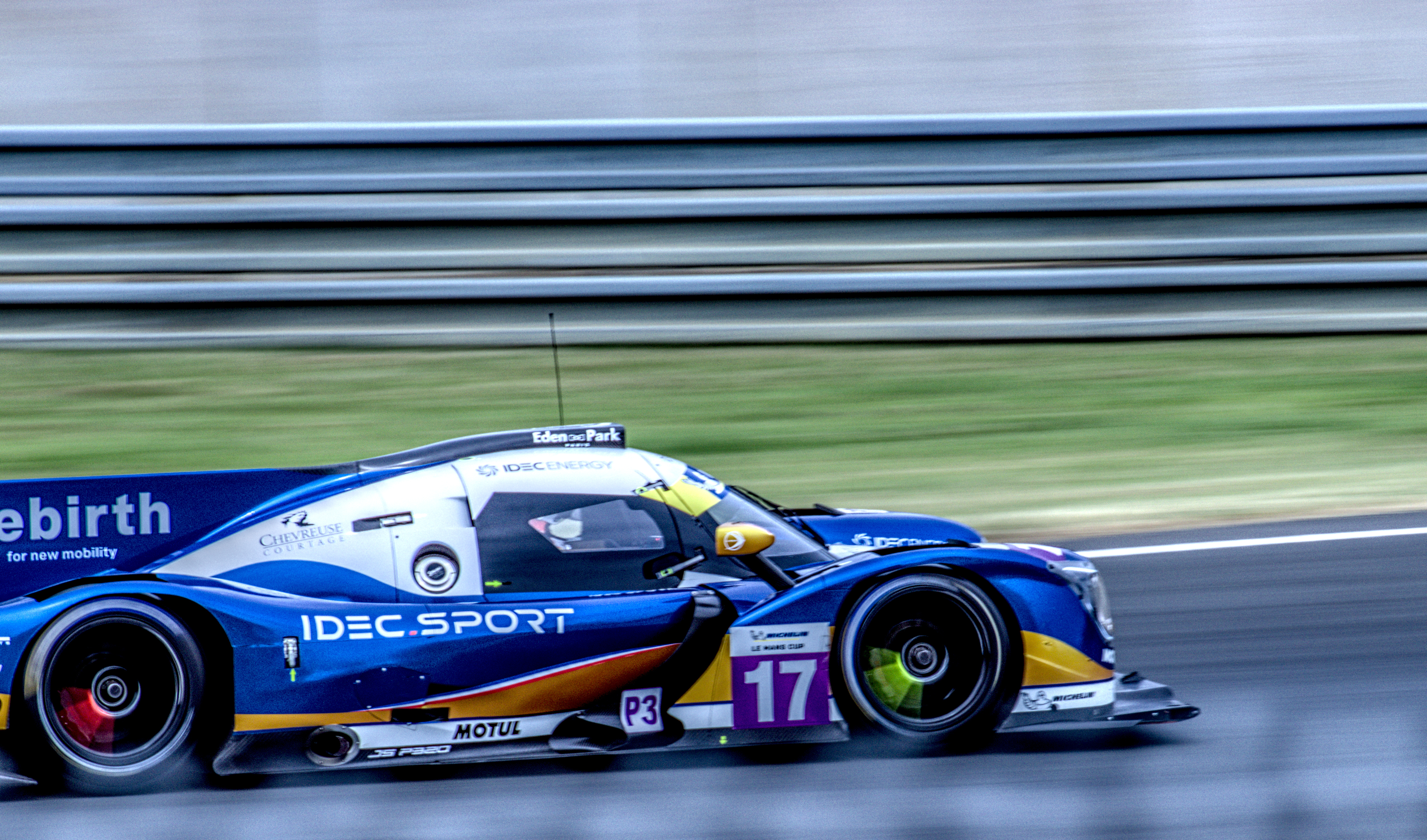
Lunardi racing for IDEC Sport at the 2024 Road to Le Mans.

Following a one-off appearance in the 2017 GT4 European Series Southern Cup, Lunardi joined Eric De Doncker's Motorsport 98 outfit to race in the LMP3 class of the Le Mans Cup the following year. He featured in select races for the team up until 2021, scoring a best result of second at Spa in 2019 and Le Castellet in 2020. In those two years, Lunardi also made one-off appearances in the LMP3 class of the European Le Mans Series for Inter Europol Competition, most notably winning at Monza in the latter year. Lunardi then joined IDEC Sport from 2022 until 2024 as he continued to race in select rounds of the Le Mans Cup, taking a best result of fifth at Le Castellet in 2022, which helped him end the year 12th in points.

== Racing record ==
=== Racing career summary ===
| Season | Series | Team | Races | Wins | Poles | F/Laps | Podiums | Points | Position |
|---|---|---|---|---|---|---|---|---|---|
| 2003 | Formula Ford France | Sirius | | | | | | | |
| 2005 | Peugeot RC Cup | Geoscan | 14 | 4 | 4 | 7 | 8 | 109 | **2nd** |
| 2006 | Peugeot RC Cup | Geoscan | 13 | 3 | 5 | 4 | 9 | 170 | **1st** |
| 2007 | THP Spider Cup | RBA Sport | 13 | 5 | 4 | 5 | 10 | 206 | **1st** |
| 2007 | Diester Racing Cup | | 8 | 4 | 3 | 2 | 6 | 123 | 4th |
| 2008 | FIA GT3 European Championship | La Torre Motorsport | 8 | 0 | 0 | 0 | 1 | 22 | 8th |
| 2008 | FIA GT3 European Championship | JMB Racing | 3 | 0 | 0 | 0 | 1 | 22 | 8th |
| 2008 | French GT Championship – GT3 | Sport Garage | 2 | 0 | 0 | 0 | 0 | 6 | 18th |
| 2008 | French GT Championship – GT3 | Matech GT Racing | 2 | 0 | 2 | 0 | 0 | 6 | 18th |
| 2008 | THP Spider Cup | RBA Sport | 2 | 2 | 2 | 0 | 2 | 0 | NC |
| 2009 | FIA GT3 European Championship | Matech GT Racing | 8 | 1 | 0 | 0 | 2 | 22 | 11th |
| 2009 | FIA GT3 European Championship | Mühlner Motorsport | 2 | 0 | 0 | 0 | 0 | 22 | 11th |
| 2009 | French GT Championship – GT3 | Sport Garage | 2 | 0 | 0 | 0 | 0 | 0 | NC |
| 2009 | ADAC GT Masters | Callaway Competition | 2 | 0 | 0 | 0 | 1 | 10 | 18th |
| 2010 | French GT Championship | Saintéloc – Phoenix Racing | 11 | 1 | 0 | 0 | 2 | 46 | 10th |
| 2010 | FIA GT3 European Championship | Toni Seiler Racing | 8 | 0 | 1 | 0 | 2 | 51 | 11th |
| 2010 | International GT Open – Super GT | JMB Racing | 2 | 0 | 0 | 0 | 1 | 0 | NC |
| 2011 | French GT Championship | Saintéloc | 6 | 0 | 0 | 0 | 0 | 0 | NC |
| 2011 | ADAC GT Masters | Liqui Moly Team Engstler | 16 | 4 | 3 | 2 | 7 | 189 | **1st** |
| 2011 | FIA GT3 European Championship | Saintéloc Racing | 12 | 0 | 0 | 0 | 1 | 35 | 16th |
| 2011 | Blancpain Endurance Series – GT3 Pro | Marc VDS Racing Team | 1 | 0 | 0 | 0 | 0 | 8 | 29th |
| 2012 | ADAC GT Masters | Alpina | 16 | 3 | 2 | 2 | 5 | 134 | 4th |
| 2012 | FIA GT3 European Championship | Saintéloc Racing | 8 | 0 | 1 | 1 | 0 | 58 | 9th |
| 2012 | French GT Championship | Saintéloc Racing | 8 | 0 | 0 | 0 | 0 | 6 | 27th |
| 2012 | Blancpain Endurance Series – Pro-Am | Saintéloc Racing | 1 | 0 | 0 | 0 | 0 | 1 | 38th |
| 2012 | Blancpain Endurance Series – Pro | Saintéloc Racing | 2 | 0 | 0 | 0 | 0 | 5 | 24th |
| 2012 | FIA GT1 World Championship | Exim Bank Team China | 2 | 0 | 0 | 0 | 0 | 0 | 34th |
| 2013 | ADAC GT Masters | The Boss Yaco Racing | 4 | 0 | 0 | 0 | 0 | 12 | 30th |
| 2013 | French GT Championship | Team Speed Car | 10 | 3 | 0 | 0 | 4 | 125 | 4th |
| 2013 | Blancpain Endurance Series – Pro | Team Speed Car | 1 | 0 | 0 | 0 | 0 | 0 | NC |
| 2015 | European Le Mans Series – GTC | TDS Racing | 5 | 2 | 3 | 2 | 4 | 101 | **1st** |
| 2015 | French GT Championship | Duqueine Engineering | 5 | 1 | 0 | 2 | 2 | 49 | 17th |
| 2016 | European Le Mans Series – LMP3 | Duqueine Engineering | 6 | 0 | 0 | 1 | 2 | 62 | 4th |
| 2016 | V de V Endurance Series – LMP3 | Duqueine Engineering | 1 | 1 | 0 | 0 | 1 | 0 | NC |
| 2016 | Blancpain GT Series Endurance Cup | CMR by Sport Garage | 1 | 0 | 0 | 0 | 0 | 0 | NC |
| 2016 | Blancpain GT Series Endurance Cup – Pro-Am | CMR by Sport Garage | 1 | 0 | 0 | 0 | 0 | 0 | NC |
| 2017 | GT4 European Series Southern Cup – Pro-Am | Speed Car | 2 | 0 | 0 | 0 | 0 | 0 | NC |
| 2018 | Le Mans Cup – LMP3 | Motorsport 98 | 6 | 0 | 0 | 0 | 0 | 35.5 | 6th |
| 2019 | European Le Mans Series – LMP3 | Inter Europol Competition | 1 | 0 | 0 | 0 | 0 | 0.5 | 23rd |
| 2019 | Le Mans Cup – LMP3 | Motorsport 98 | 3 | 0 | 0 | 0 | 1 | 40 | 5th |
| 2020 | Le Mans Cup – LMP3 | Motorsport 98 | 5 | 0 | 0 | 0 | 1 | 40 | 8th |
| 2020 | European Le Mans Series – LMP3 | Inter Europol Competition | 2 | 1 | 0 | 0 | 2 | 40 | 8th |
| 2021 | Le Mans Cup – LMP3 | Motorsport 98 | 4 | 0 | 0 | 0 | 0 | 11 | 20th |
| 2021 | Le Mans Cup – LMP3 | Mühlner Motorsport | 1 | 0 | 0 | 0 | 0 | 11 | 20th |
| 2022 | Le Mans Cup – LMP3 | IDEC Sport | 6 | 0 | 0 | 0 | 0 | 18 | 12th |
| 2022–23 | Middle East Trophy – GT3 Pro-Am | Visiom | 1 | 0 | 0 | 0 | 0 | 24 | NC |
| 2023 | Le Mans Cup – LMP3 | IDEC Sport | 6 | 0 | 0 | 0 | 0 | 3 | 26th |
| 2024 | Le Mans Cup – LMP3 | IDEC Sport | 4 | 0 | 0 | 0 | 0 | 0 | 42nd |

=== Complete FIA GT3 European Championship results ===
(key) (Races in bold indicate pole position; races in italics indicate fastest lap)

| Year | Entrant | Chassis | Engine | 1 | 2 | 3 | 4 | 5 | 6 | 7 | 8 | 9 | 10 | 11 | 12 | Pos. | Points |
|---|---|---|---|---|---|---|---|---|---|---|---|---|---|---|---|---|---|
| 2008 | La Torre Motorsport | Dodge Viper Competition Coupe | Dodge Viper 8.3 L V10 | SIL; 1; 8 | SIL; 2; 5 | MNZ; 1 Ret | MNZ; 2; 5 | OSC; 1; 8 | OSC; 2; 3 | BRN; 1 Ret | BRN; 2; 11 | | | | | 8th | 22 |
| 2008 | JMB Racing | Ferrari F430 GT3 | Ferrari F136 4.3 L V8 | | | | | | | | | NOG; 1; 3 | NOG; 2; 17 | DUB; 1; 9 | DUB; 2 DNS | 8th | 22 |
| 2009 | Matech GT Racing | Ford GT GT3 | Ford Cammer 5.0 L V8 | SIL; 1; 7 | SIL; 2; 11 | ADR; 1; 1 | ADR; 2; 21 | OSC; 1; 3 | OSC; 2; 12 | ALG; 1 Ret | ALG; 2; 14 | | | | | 11th | 22 |
| 2009 | Mühlner Motorsport | Porsche 997 GT3 Cup S | Porsche 4.0 L Flat-6 | | | | | | | | | LEC; 1; 9 | LEC; 2; 5 | ZOL; 1 | ZOL; 2 | 11th | 22 |
| 2010 | Toni Seiler Racing | Corvette Z06.R GT3 | Chevrolet LS7 7.0 L V8 | SIL; 1; 2 | SIL; 2; 13 | BRN; 1; 3 | BRN; 2; 7 | JAR; 1; 20 | JAR; 2; 13 | LEC; 1; 8 | LEC; 2; 6 | ALG; 1 | ALG; 2 | ZOL; 1 | ZOL; 2 | 11th | 51 |
| 2011 | Saintéloc Racing | Audi R8 LMS | Audi 5.2 L V10 | ALG; 1; 11 | ALG; 2; 17 | SIL; 1; 14 | SIL; 2; 7 | NAV; 1; 9 | NAV; 2; 4 | LEC; 1; 3 | LEC; 2 Ret | SLO; 1; 16 | SLO; 2; 11 | ZAN; 1; 16 | ZAN; 2; 17 | 16th | 35 |
| 2012 | Saintéloc Racing | Audi R8 LMS | Audi 5.2 L V10 | NOG; 1; 5 | NOG; 2; 6 | ZOL; 1 Ret | ZOL; 2; 6 | NAV; 1; 5 | NAV; 2; 9 | ALG; 1 | ALG; 2 | MSC; 1 | MSC; 2 | NUR; 1; 5 | NUR; 2; 5 | 9th | 58 |

=== Complete ADAC GT Masters results ===
(key) (Races in bold indicate pole position) (Races in italics indicate fastest lap)

| Year | Team | Car | 1 | 2 | 3 | 4 | 5 | 6 | 7 | 8 | 9 | 10 | 11 | 12 | 13 | 14 | 15 | 16 | DC | Points |
|---|---|---|---|---|---|---|---|---|---|---|---|---|---|---|---|---|---|---|---|---|
| 2009 | Callaway Competition | Corvette Z06.R GT3 | OSC1; 1 | OSC1; 2 | ASS; 1 | ASS; 2 | HOC; 1 | HOC; 2 | LAU; 1 | LAU; 2 | NÜR; 1 | NÜR; 2 | SAC; 1 | SAC; 2 | OSC2; 1 Ret | OSC2; 2; 2 | | | 18th | 10 |
| 2011 | Liqui Moly Team Engstler | BMW Alpina B6 GT3 | **OSC**; **1**; 1 | OSC; 2; 3 | SAC; 1 Ret | SAC; 2 Ret | ZOL; 1; 2 | ZOL; 2; 1 | NÜR; 1 Ret | NÜR; 2; 20 | RBR; 1; 6 | RBR; 2; 2 | LAU; 1; 4 | LAU; 2; 4 | ASS; 1; 1 | ASS; 2; 7 | **HOC**; **1**; 1 | **HOC**; **2** Ret | 1st | 189 |
| 2012 | Alpina | Alpina B6 GT3 | OSC; 1; 1 | **OSC**; **2**; 4 | ZAN; 1; 5 | ZAN; 2; 27 | SAC; 1; 11 | SAC; 2; 16 | NÜR; 1; 2 | NÜR; 2; 1 | RBR; 1; 13 | RBR; 2; 18 | LAU; 1; 23 | LAU; 2; 19 | NÜR; 1; 1 | **NÜR**; **2**; 2 | HOC; 1; 18 | HOC; 2; 10 | 4th | 134 |
| 2013 | The Boss Yaco Racing | Audi R8 LMS Ultra | OSC; 1; 4 | OSC; 2; 20 | SPA; 1; 17 | SPA; 2; 11 | SAC; 1 | SAC; 2 | NÜR; 1 | NÜR; 2 | RBR; 1 | RBR; 2 | LAU; 1 | LAU; 2 | SVK; 1 | SVK; 2 | HOC; 1 | HOC; 2 | 30th | 12 |

=== Complete FIA GT1 World Championship results ===
| Year | Team | Car | 1 | 2 | 3 | 4 | 5 | 6 | 7 | 8 | 9 | 10 | 11 | 12 | 13 | 14 | 15 | 16 | 17 | 18 | Pos | Points |
|---|---|---|---|---|---|---|---|---|---|---|---|---|---|---|---|---|---|---|---|---|---|---|
| 2012 | Exim Bank Team China | Porsche 911 GT3-R | NOG; QR | NOG; CR | ZOL; QR | ZOL; CR | NAV; QR; Ret | NAV; QR; 15 | SVK; QR | SVK; CR | ALG; QR; DNS | ALG; CR; DNS | SVK; QR | SVK; CR | MOS; QR | MOS; CR | NUR; QR | NUR; CR | DON; QR | DON; CR | 34th | 0 |

=== Complete GT World Challenge Europe results ===
==== GT World Challenge Europe Endurance Cup ====
(Races in bold indicate pole position) (Races in italics indicate fastest lap)

| Year | Team | Car | Class | 1 | 2 | 3 | 4 | 5 | 6 | 7 | 8 | Pos. | Points |
|---|---|---|---|---|---|---|---|---|---|---|---|---|---|
| 2011 | Marc VDS Racing Team | Alpina B6 GT3 | GT3 Pro | MNZ | NAV | SPA; 6H | SPA; 12H | SPA; 24H | MAG | SIL; 6 | | 29th | 8 |
| 2012 | Saintéloc Racing | Audi R8 LMS Ultra | Pro-Am | MNZ | SIL | LEC; 16 | | | | | | 38th | 1 |
| 2012 | Saintéloc Racing | Audi R8 LMS Ultra | Pro | | | | SPA; 6H ? | SPA; 12H ? | SPA; 24H; Ret | NÜR; 5 | NAV; DNS | 24th | 5 |
| 2013 | Team Speed Car | Audi R8 LMS Ultra | Pro | MNZ | SIL | LEC; 26 | SPA; 6H | SPA; 12H | SPA; 24H | NÜR | | NC | 0 |
| 2016 | CMR by Sport Garage | Ferrari 458 Italia GT3 | Pro-Am | MNZ; NC | SIL | LEC | SPA; 6H | SPA; 12H | SPA; 24H | NÜR | | NC | 0 |

=== Complete European Le Mans Series results ===
| Year | Team | Class | Car | Engine | 1 | 2 | 3 | 4 | 5 | 6 | Pos. | Points |
|---|---|---|---|---|---|---|---|---|---|---|---|---|
| 2015 | TDS Racing | GTC | BMW Z4 GT3 | BMW P65B44 4.4 L V8 | **SIL**; 1 | IMO; 4 | RBR; 2 | **LEC**; 1 | **EST**; 2 | | 1st | 101 |
| 2016 | Duqueine Engineering | LMP3 | Ligier JS P3 | Nissan VK50VE 5.0 L V8 | SIL; 4 | IMO; 4 | RBR; 2 | LEC; 2 | SPA; Ret | EST; 9 | 4th | 62 |
| 2019 | Inter Europol Competition | LMP3 | Ligier JS P3 | Gibson GK428 4.2 L V8 | LEC; 13 | MNZ | CAT | SIL | SPA | ALG | 23rd | 0.5 |
| 2020 | Inter Europol Competition | LMP3 | Ligier JS P320 | Nissan VK56DE 5.6L V8 | LEC | SPA | LEC | MNZ; 1 | ALG; 3 | | 8th | 40 |

=== Complete Le Mans Cup results ===
(key) (Races in bold indicate pole position; results in italics indicate fastest lap)

| Year | Entrant | Class | Chassis | 1 | 2 | 3 | 4 | 5 | 6 | 7 | Rank | Points |
|---|---|---|---|---|---|---|---|---|---|---|---|---|
| 2018 | Motorsport 98 | LMP3 | Ligier JS P3 | LEC | MNZ; 8 | LMS; 1; 15 | LMS; 2; 10 | RBR; 7 | SPA; 4 | ALG; 4 | 6th | 35.5 |
| 2019 | Motorsport 98 | LMP3 | Ligier JS P3 | LEC | MNZ | LMS; 1 | LMS; 2 | CAT; 5 | SPA; 2 | ALG; 4 | 5th | 40 |
| 2020 | Motorsport 98 | LMP3 | Ligier JS P320 | LEC1; 2 | SPA; 6 | LEC2; Ret | LMS; 1 | LMS; 2 | MNZ; 5 | ALG; 8 | 8th | 40 |
| 2021 | Motorsport 98 | LMP3 | Ligier JS P320 | BAR; 12 | LEC; 8 | | LMS; 1; 19 | LMS; 2 DNS | SPA; 7 | POR | 20th | 11 |
| 2021 | Mühlner Motorsport | LMP3 | Ligier JS P320 | | | MNZ; Ret | | | | | 20th | 11 |
| 2022 | IDEC Sport | LMP3 | Ligier JS P320 | LEC; 5 | IMO; 7 | LMS; 1; 26 | LMS; 2 Ret | MNZ | SPA; 9 | ALG; 19 | 12th | 18 |
| 2023 | IDEC Sport | LMP3 | Ligier JS P320 | CAT; 17 | LMS; 1; 21 | LMS; 2; 9 | LEC; Ret | ARA; 12 | SPA | ALG; 25† | 26th | 3 |
| 2024 | IDEC Sport | LMP3 | Ligier JS P320 | CAT; Ret | LEC; 19 | LMS; 1; 17 | LMS; 2 Ret | SPA | MUG | ALG | 42nd | 0 |
