= FIA GT3 European Championship =

Championship made by the SRO for the GT3 group

- The FIA GT3 European Championship logo
- Category: Group GT3
- Country: International
- Inaugural season: 2006
- Folded: 2012
- Drivers: 105
- Teams: 20
- Tyre suppliers: Michelin, Dunlop, Pirelli
- Last Drivers' champion: (Austria) Dominik Baumann (Germany) Maximilian Buhk
- Last Makes' champion: (Czech Republic) Heico Gravity-Charouz Team
- Official website: gt3europe.com

The FIA GT3 European Championship was a sports car racing series organized by the Stéphane Ratel Organisation (SRO) and regulated by the Fédération Internationale de l'Automobile (FIA). It was a championship derived from the international FIA GT1 World Championship, but meant to provide competition for more amateur racers in closer to production cars. The series used extensive performance balancing and handicap weights to make cars more equal.

FIA GT3 European Championship races served as support races for the FIA GT1 World Championship races that took place in Europe.

== History ==
The FIA GT3 European Championship was launched in 2006 as a way to expand manufacturer involvement in motorsports as well as to help amateur drivers across Europe. It attempts to combine multiple one-make series into a larger event with a race within a race, teams competing not only to beat others in their own manufacturer cup but also to win the overall race.

In the future, the FIA and SRO plan to not only expand the overall European championship, but also to help in the development of multiple one-make series across Europe, similar to the Ferrari Challenge and Porsche Supercup.

=== Vehicles ===
Following in the established name usage from FIA GT, the FIA's Group GT3 differs from its GT1 and GT2 counterparts by using more low-cost engineering and design elements in the development of the road cars to their racing counterparts, as well as attempting to make all cars equal by pre- and in-season performance balancing adjustments. Unlike FIA GT1's GT1, the GT3 class cars are not allowed to be developed by their manufacturers over the course of a racing season. Manufacturers simply provide a ready-to-race car to a customer and the teams are limited in what they can alter from production specs. All cars that participate in GT3 must be allowed permission and equalized with the competition by the FIA.

The Jaguar XKR, Ford Mustang FR500GT, Ford GT, and Morgan Aero 8 were added to the homologation list for 2007, while the Venturi Atlantique silhouette, Maserati Trofeo, and Lotus Exige were all dropped due to lack of participation. The Jaguar XKR, Ford Mustang, and Morgan were eventually dropped by the 2011 season. The Audi R8 LMS and the Alpina B6 were homologated for 2009, while the Ferrari F430 GT3 was replaced by the 430 GT3 Scuderia. The Alpina B6 and Chevrolet Corvette Z06R were also dropped by the 2011 season, while the Ferrari 430 GT3 Scuderia was replaced with the 458 Italia GT3.

From 2006-09 teams were limited to a maximum of 3 cars, with each car having 2 drivers. From 2010 teams are limited to a maximum of two cars, each with two drivers. A team must use the same type of car for each of their entries. There can be no more than six entries per marque (three two car teams), although teams entering cars in the GT1 championship can enter cars in GT3 beyond this restriction.

=== Drivers ===
The drivers in FIA GT3 are not on the same level as those in FIA GT, in that they are intended to be more amateur drivers than the professionals who are hired in FIA GT. The term gentleman driver is that most commonly used to describe the drivers in FIA GT3. However, in order to ensure that the drivers in FIA GT3 are of amateur status, the FIA put into place rules regarding what determines a driver's skill level.

Drivers under the age of 55 who fit the following criteria are not allowed in FIA GT3:

- Has held an FIA Super Licence or Grade A License.
- Has finished in the Top 10 in Formula 3000, A1 Grand Prix, GP2, Indy Racing League, or Champ Car World Series. (Though Formula 3000, A1 Grand Prix, and Champ Car are all defunct currently, the regulations for those are still in effect because drivers who participated in those series may still be active in other disciplines.)
- Has finished in the Top 6 of any international or national Formula 3 championship.
- Has won the 24 Hours of Le Mans outright.
- Has been a hired works driver for a major automobile manufacturer.
- Has achievements or performances which, according to the SRO and FIA, deem that individual a professional racing driver.

Exception to this is that drivers over the age of 45 can petition the SRO and FIA to be allowed to race even with prior professional experience.

=== Races ===
For each event in the FIA GT3 season, two individual races are held. Each driver on the two car team qualifies the car individually, and then starts each of the two races from their respective starting position, with one driver starting the first race and the other driver starting the second race. Each race requires one pit stop, where the team must switch between the two drivers, as well as change all four tires. Each team is limited to only two crew members in the pits during a pit stop. All races are one hour in length.

=== Championships ===
FIA GT3 attempts to present itself as a gathering of cup races. Besides the fact that all cars are individually fighting against others to have a race win, cars are also meant to be competing against cars of their same make. Each individual make in GT3 has their own respective drivers championship alongside the overall GT3 Teams Championship and Drivers Championship.

Points are awarded to the top eight on the scale of 10-8-6-5-4-3-2-1, with each car in a team scoring points even if multiple entries finish in scoring positions.

==== Champions ====
Season	Drivers Champion(s)	Team Champion
2006	(United Kingdom) Sean Edwards	(United Kingdom) Tech 9 Motorsport
2007	(France) Gilles Vannelet (Switzerland) Henri Moser	(Germany) Martini Callaway Racing
2008	(France) Arnaud Peyroles (France) James Ruffier	(Switzerland) Matech GT Racing
2009	(Germany) Christopher Haase (Germany) Christopher Mies	(France) Hexis Racing AMR
2010	(Germany) Daniel Keilwitz (Germany) Christian Hohenadel	(Belgium) Prospeed Competition
2011	(Italy) Francesco Castellacci (Italy) Federico Leo	(Germany) Heico Motorsport
2012	(Austria) Dominik Baumann (Germany) Maximilian Buhk	(Czech Republic) Heico Gravity-Charouz Team

== Similar series ==
On November 29, 2006, the German ADAC launched a race series known as GT Masters, which will be a national level series for FIA GT3 cars. Their initial season in 2007 will feature six races (all but one in Germany), serving as support races for the 24 Hours Nürburgring and Deutsche Tourenwagen Masters. The series is the first national level version of FIA GT3.

In 2005 the Confederation of Australian Motor Sport launched the return of the Australian GT Championship which uses older GT2 and GT3 cars with balanced performance. As of 2012 the Australian GT Championship allows GT3 cars and will allow older GT cars as well.

Starting from 2007, the GT3 Brasil Championship has been held in Brazil, also organized by SRO, with several veteran drivers racing in some events, such as former Formula One champions Emerson Fittipaldi and Nelson Piquet and former Brazilian Stock Car champions Chico Serra and Alexandre Negrão, who also was the first series champion. Differently from the European series, GT3 Brasil accepts professional drivers, in a system where drivers are graded from A (International Driver) to D (Fully Amateur), however, at least one of the drivers in each car must be of amateur status (C or D), except if a team is composed of two B-graded drivers, in that case, the car gets a 60 kg ballast penalty.

Various other championships are also running now which allow GT3-spec cars to participate, notably British GT Championship, FFSA GT Championship, Belcar, Super GT and Super Taikyu.

In 2007 the SRO and FIA have launched a similar championship, known as the GT4 European Cup, which features the same concept of using serial production sports cars, but with smaller engine sizes, minimum modifications and restrictions on the professionalism of participating drivers.

In 2010–2012, the FIA GT1 World Championship acted as a senior series to this series. Drivers in GT1 drive were more experienced (and can be hired by the factory), drove more powerful cars, and the season was longer and visited more countries (including non-European countries). Because the GT1 Championship allowed performance balanced GT3 cars and 2009-spec GT2 cars in 2012, the only difference in the car lineups was the GT3 Championship still being restricted to GT3 cars. All GT3 races occurred on the same weekend as a corresponding GT1 race, and the races were also at different times of the day (e.g. Paul Ricard hosts both a GT1 and a GT3 race on the same weekend). Some manufacturers like Aston Martin had raced cars in both the GT1 and GT3 championships.

== Circuits ==
- (Italy) Adria International Raceway (2009)
- (Portugal) Algarve International Circuit (2009–2012)
- Automotodróm Slovakia Ring (2011)
- (Czech Republic) Brno Circuit (2007–2008, 2010)
- (Belgium) Circuit de Spa-Francorchamps (2006)
- (France) Circuit Paul Armagnac (2008, 2012)
- (France) Circuit Paul Ricard (2009–2011)
- (Netherlands) Circuit Zandvoort (2011)
- (Belgium) Circuit Zolder (2009–2010, 2012)
- (Spain) Circuito de Navarra (2011–2012)
- (Spain) Circuito del Jarama (2010)
- (United Arab Emirates) Dubai Autodrome (2007–2008)
- (France) Dijon-Prenois (2006)
- (Italy) Monza Circuit (2007–2008)
- (Russia) Moscow Raceway (2012)
- (Germany) Motorsport Arena Oschersleben (2006, 2008–2009)
- (Italy) Mugello Circuit (2006)
- (Germany) Nürburgring (2012)
- (United Kingdom) Silverstone Circuit (2006–2011)
- (Romania) Bucharest Ring (2007-2008)
