= James Ruffier =

French racing driver (born 1974)

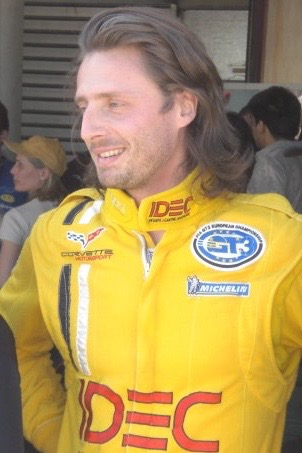
- Ruffier in 2008
- Nationality: (France) French
- Born: February 20, 1974 (age 52) Champigny-sur-Marne, France

Championship titles
- 2008 2004: FIA GT3 European Championship; Porsche Carrera Cup France

James Ruffier (born 20 February 1974) is a French racing driver who last competed in the 24H Series for IDEC Sport Racing.

In 2008, Ruffier and his teammate, Arnaud Peyroles, won the FIA GT3 European Championship, whilst driving for Martini Callaway Racing.

== Racing record ==
=== Career summary ===
Season	Series	Team	Races	Wins	Poles	F/Laps	Podiums	Points	Position
1993	Formula Renault France		11	0	0	0	0	16	12th
1994	French Formula Three Championship		2	0	0	0	0	?	?
1994	Formula Renault France		6	0	0	0	0	12	15th
1995	French Formula Three Championship	LD Autosport	13	0	0	0	0	28	10th
1996	Masters of Formula 3	ASM Technik	1	0	0	0	0	N/A	14th
1996	French Formula Three Championship	ASM Technik	8	0	0	0	3	38	11th
1997	Renault Spider Trophy Europe		?	0	0	0	0	4	25th
1997	French GT Championship	Riverside Compétition	2	1	0	0	2	44	16th
1998	Brazilian Prototype Championship – Division 4	Snobeck Racing	6	0	0	0	4	46	4th
1998	Renault Spider Trophy Europe		?	0	0	0	1	60	6th
1998	French GT Championship	Riverside Compétition; Ren Car	4	1	0	0	3	?	?
1999	Renault Clio Trophy Europe		?	1	1	0	1	72	7th
1999	French GT Championship	Ren Car Compétition; Apogée	3	0	0	?	0	15	75th
1999	Porsche Carrera Cup France		?	?	?	?	?	0	7th
2000	Renault Clio Trophy Europe		?	0	1	2	1	23	19th
2001	Porsche Carrera Cup France		?	?	?	?	?	0	**2nd**
2001	French GT Championship – GT Cup	DDO; Ruffier Events	5	0	0	1	1	79	28th
2002	Porsche Carrera Cup France		?	1	1	?	?	112	**2nd**
2002	French GT Championship	Ruffier Events; 917 Racing Team	8	1	1	2	7	111	14th
2002	French GT Championship – GT Cup	Ruffier Events	1	0	1	?	1	40	21st
2003	Porsche Carrera Cup France	Ruffier Racing	13	3	2	4	8	147	**2nd**
2003	French GT Championship	Ruffier Racing	13	0	0	0	0	199	4th
2004	Porsche Supercup	Porsche AG	1	0	0	0	0	N/A	NC
2004	Porsche Carrera Cup France	Ruffier Racing	14	6	4	1	9	194	**1st**
2004	French GT Championship	Ruffier Racing	4	0	0	0	0	?	?
2005	Porsche Carrera Cup France	Ruffier Racing	2	0	1	0	1	?	?
2005	French GT Championship – GT Cup	Ruffier Racing	4	2	1	3	4	?	?
2006	FIA GT3 European Championship	Riverside	10	0	2	2	2	19	11th
2006	French GT Championship	Ruffier Racing	4	0	0	0	0	?	?
2007	FIA GT3 European Championship	Riverside	9	1	0	2	3	31	4th
2007	French GT Championship – GT3	Ruffier Racing	6	0	0	1	0	?	?
2008	FIA GT3 European Championship	Martini Callaway Racing	11	2	1	2	5	54	**1st**
2008	French GT Championship – GT3	Ruffier Racing	14	3	4	2	7	212	**2nd**
2009	FIA GT Championship	Selleslagh Racing Team	8	1	0	0	2	39	**3rd**
2009	French GT Championship – GT3	Ruffier Racing	3	0	0	0	0	?	?
2015	Challenge Endurance GT/Tourisme V de V	IDEC Sport Racing	1	0	0	0	0	?	?
2017	24H Series – SP2	IDEC Sport Racing	1	0	0	0	0	0	NC

=== Complete FIA GT3 European Championship results ===
(key) (Races in bold indicate pole position) (Races in italics indicate fastest lap)

Year	Team	Car	1	2	3	4	5	6	7	8	9	10	11	12	Pos.	Pts
2006	Riverside	Corvette Z06.R GT3	SIL; 1 Ret	SIL; 2; 21	OSC; 1; 3	**OSC**; **2**; 3	SPA; 1; 30	SPA; 2 DSQ	DIJ; 1; 5	**DIJ**; **2**; 6	MUG; 1 Ret	MUG; 2; 17			11th	19
2007	Riverside	Corvette Z06.R GT3	SIL; 1 Ret	SIL; 2 WD	BUC; 1; 28	BUC; 2; 11	MON; 1; 4	MON; 2; 2	BRN; 1; 1	BRN; 2; 2	DUB; 1; 28	DUB; 2 Ret			4th	31
2008	Martini Callaway Racing	Corvette Z06.R GT3	SIL; 1; 7	SIL; 2; 2	MON; 1; 3	MON; 2; 2	OSC; 1; 10	OSC; 2; 4	BRN; 1; 4	BRN; 2 Ret	NOG; 1; 27	**NOG**; **2**; 1	DUB; 1; 1	**DUB**; **2** C	1st	54

=== Complete FIA GT Championship results ===
(key) (Races in bold indicate pole position) (Races in italics indicate fastest lap)

Year	Team	Car	Class	1	2	3	4	5	6	7	8	Pos.	Pts
2009	Selleslagh Racing Team	Corvette C6.R	GT1	SIL; 6	ADR; 5	OSC; 4	SPA; 5	HUN; 6	ALG; 1	LEC; 3	ZOL; 6	3rd	38
