= Phil Quaife =

British racing driver

Philip John Quaife (born 27 March 1986) is a British racing driver.

== Career ==
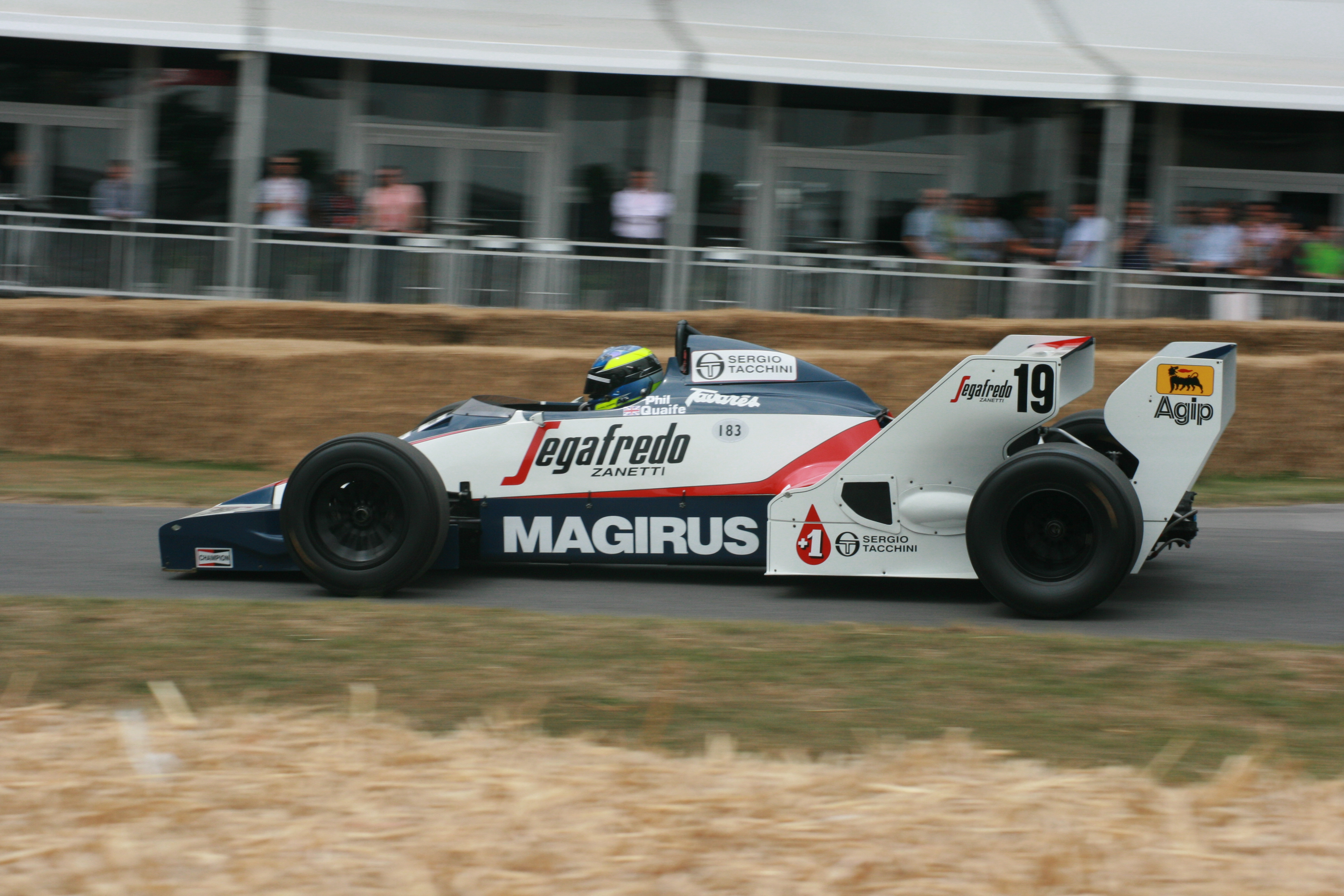
Quaife demonstrating a Toleman TG183B at the 2010 Goodwood Festival of Speed.

Quaife enjoyed a successful start to his racing career. After winning his first major karting title in the Junior Rotax Max winter championship before finishing as runner-up in the summer championship in 2002, he stepped up to the Senior Rotax Max series in '03, finishing 5th overall.

In 2004, Quaife graduated to the Radical SR3 Enduro Championship for his first full season in cars. He ended up sixth in the overall standings and winner of the 'most improved driver' award.

It had laid the foundations for what was to follow. 14 victories from 14 starts including 12 pole positions in the 2005 title fight did much to underline his potential and he was soon courted by Motorbase Performance to partner Stuart Moseley behind the wheel of a Porsche 911 GT3 as part of their British GT Championship assault. The conflict of interests would ultimately cost him the Radical championship but the experience wrought from his sportscar campaign which included a class victory, a brace of pole positions and podiums and a top-ten finish in the overall standings would prove vital in the success of the following season.

A two pronged attack was once again planned for 2006 and Quaife didn't disappoint. Moving up to pilot the quicker SR8, he duly attended to unfinished business in the Radical Enduro Championship as once again he dominated the 20 race-calendar, recording eight victories and five further podiums to clinch the title that had eluded him the previous year. Staying with Motorbase for a planned attack on the Porsche Carrera Cup Pro-Am category, he took ten class victories and the title in just his first season of the highly competitive series. So impressive were his results in fact that he would end the year seventh in the overall championship and was rewarded when the BRDC named him as part of its 'Rising Stars' programme.

A step up into the Porsche Supercup followed in 2007 as Phil travelled around Europe as part of the official Formula One support bill. Seen as the most competitive and prestigious one-make GT championship in the world, he faced a steep learning curve up against some of the best sportscar drivers around. But after improving throughout the season he would eventually end up 16th overall behind the wheel of the Team Indonesia 911. Once again, he would split his duties between two championships though and teamed up with British Porsche 997 outfit Tech 9 Motorsport for the FIA European GT3 championship. A podium in the rain-affected second race at Budapest was a highlight of the season on his way to 10th overall in the championship before a drive in the Dubai 24 Hours and Britcar night race at Brands Hatch brought his year to an end.

2008 saw Quaife back in the Porsche Carrera Cup GB competing for seasoned sportscar outfit Jota Sport. Currently fifth after eight rounds, he claimed six podiums in his debut season in the senior category. In tandem with his Carrera Cup commitments, he ran a second season in the FIA GT3 European championship aboard the new Jaguar XKR. Quaife was a regular in the Dubai 24 hours winning the A3T race there in 2015.

In June 2010, an unforeseen pitstop derailed Quaife's hope for a strong finish in the ALGARVE 1000KMS.

He currently lies fifth in the overall standings and took his maiden pole positions in the penultimate round at Silverstone. In 2017 at the Blancpain GT Series Spring Cup, Quaife collected two silver podium finishes.

== Racing record ==
=== Complete Porsche Supercup results ===
(key) (Races in bold indicate pole position – 2 points awarded 2008 onwards in all races) (Races in italics indicate fastest lap)

Year	Team	1	2	3	4	5	6	7	8	9	10	11	12	DC	Points
2006	Morollato Stars Team	BHR	ITA1	GER1	ESP	MON	GBR	USA1	USA2	FRA	GER2	HUN	ITA2; 16	NC‡	0‡
2007	Racing Team Indonesia	BHR1; 16	BHR2; 13	ESP1; 21	MON; 14	FRA; 11	GBR; 22	GER; 17	HUN; 13	TUR; 10	ITA; Ret	BEL; 9		17th	33
2008	Racing Team Jetstream	BHR1	BHR2	ESP1	TUR	MON	FRA; 11	GBR	GER	HUN	ESP2	BEL	ITA	NC‡	0‡

‡ Not eligible for points.
