= Matech Concepts =

Swiss auto racing team and parts distributor

(Switzerland) Matech Concepts
- Founded: 2006
- Folded: 2011
- Team principal(s): Martin Bartek
- Former series: FIA GT1 World Championship; FIA GT3 European Championship
- Teams' Championships: 1 (2008 FIA GT3)

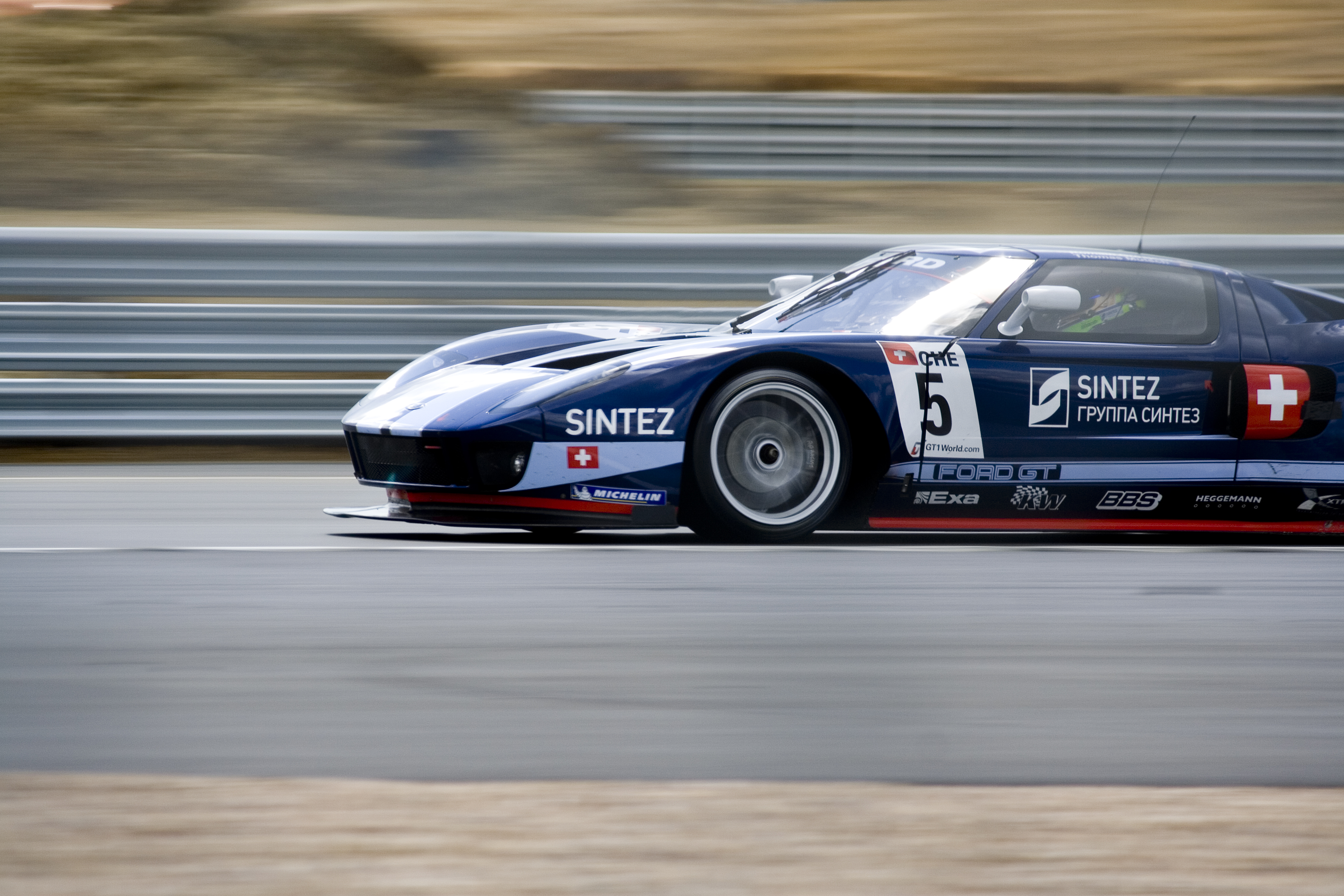
Matech's Ford GT1 driven by Romain Grosjean and Thomas Mutsch

Matech Concepts was an auto racing development firm based in Geneva, Switzerland and founded by Martin Bartek in 2006. The company had made an agreement with Ford Racing to develop the Ford GT sports car for competition, and constructs the FIA GT1 and GT3 versions of the GT at a workshop in Mayen, Germany. Matech was also the official European distributor of parts for the Ford Mustang FR500 racing cars developed by Multimatic Motorsports. Matech's vehicles competed in several national series including the British GT Championship, Belcar, GT3 Brasil Championship, VLN, as well as the FIA GT3 European Championship and FIA GT1 World Championship.

Matech also had their own race team which competed in the FIA GT3 Championship under the title of Matech GT Racing, and in the FIA GT1 Championship as well as at the 24 Hours of Le Mans under the title of Matech Competition. Matech GT Racing were the 2008 FIA GT3 Teams Champions in their second year of involvement in the series. The Matech companies ceased business operations prior to the start of the 2011 racing season.

== Racing record ==
=== 24 Hours of Le Mans results ===
Year	Entrant	No.	Car	Drivers	Class	Laps	Pos.	Class Pos.
2010	(Switzerland) Matech Competition	60	Ford GT1	(Switzerland) Romain Grosjean (Switzerland) Jonathan Hirschi (Germany) Thomas Mutsch	LMGT1	171	DNF	DNF
2010	(Switzerland) Matech Competition	61	Ford GT1	(Switzerland) Cyndie Allemann (Switzerland) Rahel Frey (Switzerland) Natacha Gachnang	LMGT1	59	DNF	DNF
