= 2007 FIA GT Adria 2 Hours =

Layout of the Adria International Raceway

The 2007 FIA GT Adria 2 Hours was the seventh race of the 2007 FIA GT Championship season. It took place at Adria International Raceway, Italy, on September 8, 2007. This race was run later than usual, under the cover of darkness. However the track did use floodlights in an attempt to aid the drivers.

== Official results ==
Class winners in bold. Cars failing to complete 75% of winner's distance marked as Not Classified (NC). Cars with a C under their class are running in the Citation Cup, with the winner marked in bold italics.

| Pos | Class | No | Team | Drivers | Chassis | Tyre | Laps |
| Pos | Class | No | Team | Drivers | Engine | Tyre | Laps |
|---|---|---|---|---|---|---|---|
| 1 | **GT1** | **33** | **(Austria) Jetalliance Racing** | **(Austria) Karl Wendlinger (United Kingdom) Ryan Sharp** | **Aston Martin DBR9** | MI | **95** |
| 1 | **GT1** | **33** | **(Austria) Jetalliance Racing** | **(Austria) Karl Wendlinger (United Kingdom) Ryan Sharp** | **Aston Martin 6.0L V12** | MI | **95** |
| 2 | GT1 | 11 | (Italy) Scuderia Playteam Sarafree | (Italy) Andrea Bertolini (Italy) Andrea Piccini | Maserati MC12 GT1 | P | 95 |
| 2 | GT1 | 11 | (Italy) Scuderia Playteam Sarafree | (Italy) Andrea Bertolini (Italy) Andrea Piccini | Maserati 6.0L V12 | P | 95 |
| 3 | GT1 | 23 | (Italy) Aston Martin Racing BMS | (United Kingdom) Jamie Davies (Italy) Fabio Babini | Aston Martin DBR9 | P | 95 |
| 3 | GT1 | 23 | (Italy) Aston Martin Racing BMS | (United Kingdom) Jamie Davies (Italy) Fabio Babini | Aston Martin 6.0L V12 | P | 95 |
| 4 | GT1 | 2 | (Germany) Vitaphone Racing Team | (Portugal) Miguel Ramos (San Marino) Christian Montanari | Maserati MC12 GT1 | MI | 95 |
| 4 | GT1 | 2 | (Germany) Vitaphone Racing Team | (Portugal) Miguel Ramos (San Marino) Christian Montanari | Maserati 6.0L V12 | MI | 95 |
| 5 | GT1 | 5 | (Netherlands) Carsport Holland (Germany) Phoenix Racing | (Netherlands) Mike Hezemans (Switzerland) Jean-Denis Délétraz | Chevrolet Corvette C6.R | MI | 95 |
| 5 | GT1 | 5 | (Netherlands) Carsport Holland (Germany) Phoenix Racing | (Netherlands) Mike Hezemans (Switzerland) Jean-Denis Délétraz | Chevrolet LS7-R 7.0L V8 | MI | 95 |
| 6 | GT1 | 28 | (Germany) Reiter Lamborghini | (Netherlands) Jos Menten (Netherlands) Peter Kox | Lamborghini Murcielago R-GT | MI | 94 |
| 6 | GT1 | 28 | (Germany) Reiter Lamborghini | (Netherlands) Jos Menten (Netherlands) Peter Kox | Lamborghini 6.0L V12 | MI | 94 |
| 7 | GT1 | 22 | (Italy) Aston Martin Racing BMS | (Italy) Ferdinando Monfardini (Italy) Enrico Toccacelo | Aston Martin DBR9 | P | 94 |
| 7 | GT1 | 22 | (Italy) Aston Martin Racing BMS | (Italy) Ferdinando Monfardini (Italy) Enrico Toccacelo | Aston Martin 6.0L V12 | P | 94 |
| 8 | GT1 | 36 | (Austria) Jetalliance Racing | (Austria) Lukas Lichtner-Hoyer (Austria) Robert Lechner | Aston Martin DBR9 | MI | 93 |
| 8 | GT1 | 36 | (Austria) Jetalliance Racing | (Austria) Lukas Lichtner-Hoyer (Austria) Robert Lechner | Aston Martin 6.0L V12 | MI | 93 |
| 9 | GT1 | 7 | (Germany) All-Inkl.com Racing | (France) Christophe Bouchut (Germany) Stefan Mücke | Lamborghini Murcielago R-GT | MI | 93 |
| 9 | GT1 | 7 | (Germany) All-Inkl.com Racing | (France) Christophe Bouchut (Germany) Stefan Mücke | Lamborghini 6.0L V12 | MI | 93 |
| 10 | GT1 | 4 | (Belgium) PK Carsport | (Belgium) Anthony Kumpen (Belgium) Bert Longin | Chevrolet Corvette C5-R | MI | 92 |
| 10 | GT1 | 4 | (Belgium) PK Carsport | (Belgium) Anthony Kumpen (Belgium) Bert Longin | Chevrolet LS7-R 7.0L V8 | MI | 92 |
| 11 | **GT2** | **50** | **(Italy) AF Corse Motorola** | **(Finland) Toni Vilander (Germany) Dirk Müller** | **Ferrari F430 GT2** | MI | **92** |
| 11 | **GT2** | **50** | **(Italy) AF Corse Motorola** | **(Finland) Toni Vilander (Germany) Dirk Müller** | **Ferrari 4.0L V8** | MI | **92** |
| 12 | GT2 | 51 | (Italy) AF Corse Motorola | (Italy) Gianmaria Bruni (Monaco) Stéphane Ortelli | Ferrari F430 GT2 | MI | 92 |
| 12 | GT2 | 51 | (Italy) AF Corse Motorola | (Italy) Gianmaria Bruni (Monaco) Stéphane Ortelli | Ferrari 4.0L V8 | MI | 92 |
| 13 | **GT1; C** | **16** | **(Monaco) JMB Racing** | **(France) Alain Ferté (United Kingdom) Ben Aucott** | **Maserati MC12 GT1** | MI | **92** |
| 13 | **GT1; C** | **16** | **(Monaco) JMB Racing** | **(France) Alain Ferté (United Kingdom) Ben Aucott** | **Maserati 6.0L V12** | MI | **92** |
| 14 | GT2 | 97 | (Italy) BMS Scuderia Italia | (France) Emmanuel Collard (Italy) Matteo Malucelli | Porsche 997 GT3-RSR | P | 92 |
| 14 | GT2 | 97 | (Italy) BMS Scuderia Italia | (France) Emmanuel Collard (Italy) Matteo Malucelli | Porsche 3.8L Flat-6 | P | 92 |
| 15 | GT2 | 74 | (Italy) Ebimotors | (Italy) Marcello Zani (France) Xavier Pompidou | Porsche 997 GT3-RSR | MI | 91 |
| 15 | GT2 | 74 | (Italy) Ebimotors | (Italy) Marcello Zani (France) Xavier Pompidou | Porsche 3.8L Flat-6 | MI | 91 |
| 16 | GT2 | 99 | (United Kingdom) Tech9 Motorsport | (Russia) Leo Machitski (United Kingdom) Sean Edwards | Porsche 997 GT3-RSR | MI | 91 |
| 16 | GT2 | 99 | (United Kingdom) Tech9 Motorsport | (Russia) Leo Machitski (United Kingdom) Sean Edwards | Porsche 3.8L Flat-6 | MI | 91 |
| 17 | GT2 | 53 | (Italy) Racing Team Edil Cris | (Italy) Matteo Cressoni (Italy) Maurizio Mediani | Ferrari F430 GT2 | P | 91 |
| 17 | GT2 | 53 | (Italy) Racing Team Edil Cris | (Italy) Matteo Cressoni (Italy) Maurizio Mediani | Ferrari 4.0L V8 | P | 91 |
| 18 | GT2 | 52 | (Italy) Racing Team Edil Cris | (Italy) Paolo Ruberti (France) Damien Pasini | Ferrari F430 GT2 | P | 90 |
| 18 | GT2 | 52 | (Italy) Racing Team Edil Cris | (Italy) Paolo Ruberti (France) Damien Pasini | Ferrari 4.0L V8 | P | 90 |
| 19 | GT2 | 63 | (United Kingdom) Scuderia Ecosse | (United Kingdom) Rob Bell (United Kingdom) Tim Sugden | Ferrari F430 GT2 | P | 90 |
| 19 | GT2 | 63 | (United Kingdom) Scuderia Ecosse | (United Kingdom) Rob Bell (United Kingdom) Tim Sugden | Ferrari 4.0L V8 | P | 90 |
| 20 | GT1; C | 18 | (Belgium) Selleslagh Racing Team | (Belgium) Tom Cloet (Italy) Davide Amaduzzi | Chevrolet Corvette C5-R | MI | 88 |
| 20 | GT1; C | 18 | (Belgium) Selleslagh Racing Team | (Belgium) Tom Cloet (Italy) Davide Amaduzzi | Chevrolet LS7-R 7.0L V8 | MI | 88 |
| 21 | GT1 | 1 | (Germany) Vitaphone Racing Team | (Germany) Michael Bartels (Italy) Thomas Biagi | Maserati MC12 GT1 | MI | 87 |
| 21 | GT1 | 1 | (Germany) Vitaphone Racing Team | (Germany) Michael Bartels (Italy) Thomas Biagi | Maserati 6.0L V12 | MI | 87 |
| 22 | GT1; C | 15 | (Monaco) JMB Racing | (Netherlands) Peter Kutemann (Switzerland) Henri Moser | Maserati MC12 GT1 | MI | 76 |
| 22 | GT1; C | 15 | (Monaco) JMB Racing | (Netherlands) Peter Kutemann (Switzerland) Henri Moser | Maserati 6.0L V12 | MI | 76 |
| 23 DNF | GT1 | 12 | (Italy) Scuderia Playteam Sarafree | (Italy) Giambattista Giannoccaro (Italy) Alessandro Pier Guidi | Maserati MC12 GT1 | P | 33 |
| 23 DNF | GT1 | 12 | (Italy) Scuderia Playteam Sarafree | (Italy) Giambattista Giannoccaro (Italy) Alessandro Pier Guidi | Maserati 6.0L V12 | P | 33 |
| 24 DNF | G2 | 101 | (Belgium) Belgian Racing | (Belgium) Bas Leinders (Belgium) Renaud Kuppens | Gillet Vertigo Streiff | P | 23 |
| 24 DNF | G2 | 101 | (Belgium) Belgian Racing | (Belgium) Bas Leinders (Belgium) Renaud Kuppens | Alfa Romeo 3.6L V6 | P | 23 |
| 25 DNF | GT1; C | 21 | (Switzerland) Kessel Racing | (Switzerland) Loris Kessel (Italy) Andrea Palma | Ferrari 575-GTC Maranello | MI | 8 |
| 25 DNF | GT1; C | 21 | (Switzerland) Kessel Racing | (Switzerland) Loris Kessel (Italy) Andrea Palma | Ferrari 6.0L V12 | MI | 8 |
| DSQ^{†} | GT2 | 62 | (United Kingdom) Scuderia Ecosse | (United Kingdom) Darren Turner (United Kingdom) Tim Mullen | Ferrari F430 GT2 | P | 92 |
| DSQ^{†} | GT2 | 62 | (United Kingdom) Scuderia Ecosse | (United Kingdom) Darren Turner (United Kingdom) Tim Mullen | Ferrari 4.0L V8 | P | 92 |

† – #62 Scuderia Ecosse was disqualified for failing to perform its mandatory second pit stop before the end of the race.

== Statistics ==
- Pole Position – #33 JetAlliance Racing – 1:21.051
- Average Speed – 127.28 km/h

FIA GT Championship
| Previous race: 2007 Spa 24 Hours | 2007 season | Next race: 2007 FIA GT Brno 2 Hours |
