= 2007 FIA GT Monza 2 Hours =

Layout of the Autodromo Nazionale Monza

The 2007 FIA GT Monza 2 Hours was the fourth race of the 2007 FIA GT Championship season. It took place at Autodromo Nazionale Monza on June 24, 2007.

== Official results ==
Class winners in bold. Cars failing to complete 75% of winner's distance marked as Not Classified (NC). Cars with a C under their class are running in the Citation Cup, with the winner marked in bold italics.

Pos	Class	No	Team	Drivers	Chassis	Tyre	Laps
Pos	Class	No	Team	Drivers	Engine	Tyre	Laps
1	**GT1**	**33**	**(Austria) Jetalliance Racing**	**(Austria) Karl Wendlinger (United Kingdom) Ryan Sharp**	**Aston Martin DBR9**	MI	**66**
1	**GT1**	**33**	**(Austria) Jetalliance Racing**	**(Austria) Karl Wendlinger (United Kingdom) Ryan Sharp**	**Aston Martin 6.0L V12**	MI	**66**
2	GT1	2	(Germany) Vitaphone Racing Team	(Portugal) Miguel Ramos (San Marino) Christian Montanari	Maserati MC12 GT1	MI	66
2	GT1	2	(Germany) Vitaphone Racing Team	(Portugal) Miguel Ramos (San Marino) Christian Montanari	Maserati 6.0L V12	MI	66
3	GT1	5	(Netherlands) Carsport Holland (Germany) Phoenix Racing	(Netherlands) Mike Hezemans (Switzerland) Jean-Denis Délétraz	Chevrolet Corvette C6.R	MI	66
3	GT1	5	(Netherlands) Carsport Holland (Germany) Phoenix Racing	(Netherlands) Mike Hezemans (Switzerland) Jean-Denis Délétraz	Chevrolet 7.0L V8	MI	66
4	GT1	1	(Germany) Vitaphone Racing Team	(Germany) Michael Bartels (Italy) Thomas Biagi	Maserati MC12 GT1	MI	66
4	GT1	1	(Germany) Vitaphone Racing Team	(Germany) Michael Bartels (Italy) Thomas Biagi	Maserati 6.0L V12	MI	66
5	GT1	4	(Belgium) PK Carsport	(Belgium) Anthony Kumpen (Belgium) Bert Longin	Chevrolet Corvette C5-R	MI	66
5	GT1	4	(Belgium) PK Carsport	(Belgium) Anthony Kumpen (Belgium) Bert Longin	Chevrolet 7.0L V8	MI	66
6	GT1	23	(Italy) Aston Martin Racing BMS	(United Kingdom) Jamie Davies (Italy) Fabio Babini	Aston Martin DBR9	P	66
6	GT1	23	(Italy) Aston Martin Racing BMS	(United Kingdom) Jamie Davies (Italy) Fabio Babini	Aston Martin 6.0L V12	P	66
7	GT1	36	(Austria) Jetalliance Racing	(Austria) Lukas Lichtner-Hoyer (Austria) Robert Lechner	Aston Martin DBR9	MI	66
7	GT1	36	(Austria) Jetalliance Racing	(Austria) Lukas Lichtner-Hoyer (Austria) Robert Lechner	Aston Martin 6.0L V12	MI	66
8	GT1	11	(Italy) Scuderia Playteam Sarafree	(Italy) Andrea Bertolini (Italy) Andrea Piccini	Maserati MC12 GT1	P	66
8	GT1	11	(Italy) Scuderia Playteam Sarafree	(Italy) Andrea Bertolini (Italy) Andrea Piccini	Maserati 6.0L V12	P	66
9	GT1	12	(Italy) Scuderia Playteam Sarafree	(Italy) Giambattista Giannoccaro (Italy) Alessandro Pier Guidi	Maserati MC12 GT1	P	65
9	GT1	12	(Italy) Scuderia Playteam Sarafree	(Italy) Giambattista Giannoccaro (Italy) Alessandro Pier Guidi	Maserati 6.0L V12	P	65
10	GT1	8	(Germany) All-Inkl.com Racing	(Netherlands) Jos Menten (Netherlands) Peter Kox	Lamborghini Murciélago R-GT	MI	65
10	GT1	8	(Germany) All-Inkl.com Racing	(Netherlands) Jos Menten (Netherlands) Peter Kox	Lamborghini 6.0L V12	MI	65
11	GT1	19	(Belgium) PSI Experience	(Austria) Philipp Peter (United Kingdom) Luke Hines	Chevrolet Corvette C6.R	P	65
11	GT1	19	(Belgium) PSI Experience	(Austria) Philipp Peter (United Kingdom) Luke Hines	Chevrolet 7.0L V8	P	65
12	GT1	22	(Italy) Aston Martin Racing BMS	(Italy) Enrico Toccacelo (Italy) Ferdinando Monfardini	Aston Martin DBR9	P	64
12	GT1	22	(Italy) Aston Martin Racing BMS	(Italy) Enrico Toccacelo (Italy) Ferdinando Monfardini	Aston Martin 6.0L V12	P	64
13	**GT1; C**	**18**	**(Belgium) Selleslagh Racing Team**	**(Belgium) Tom Cloet (Italy) Mauro Casadei**	**Chevrolet Corvette C5-R**	MI	**63**
13	**GT1; C**	**18**	**(Belgium) Selleslagh Racing Team**	**(Belgium) Tom Cloet (Italy) Mauro Casadei**	**Chevrolet 7.0L V8**	MI	**63**
14	GT1; C	16	(Monaco) JMB Racing	(United Kingdom) Joe Macari (United Kingdom) Ben Aucott	Maserati MC12 GT1	MI	63
14	GT1; C	16	(Monaco) JMB Racing	(United Kingdom) Joe Macari (United Kingdom) Ben Aucott	Maserati 6.0L V12	MI	63
15	**GT2**	**51**	**(Italy) AF Corse Motorola**	**(Italy) Gianmaria Bruni (Monaco) Stéphane Ortelli**	**Ferrari F430 GT2**	MI	**63**
15	**GT2**	**51**	**(Italy) AF Corse Motorola**	**(Italy) Gianmaria Bruni (Monaco) Stéphane Ortelli**	**Ferrari 4.0L V8**	MI	**63**
16	GT2	50	(Italy) AF Corse Motorola	(Finland) Toni Vilander (Germany) Dirk Müller	Ferrari F430 GT2	MI	63
16	GT2	50	(Italy) AF Corse Motorola	(Finland) Toni Vilander (Germany) Dirk Müller	Ferrari 4.0L V8	MI	63
17	GT2	52	(Italy) Racing Team Edil Cris	(Italy) Paolo Ruberti (France) Damien Pasini	Ferrari F430 GT2	P	63
17	GT2	52	(Italy) Racing Team Edil Cris	(Italy) Paolo Ruberti (France) Damien Pasini	Ferrari 4.0L V8	P	63
18	GT2	74	(Italy) Ebimotors	(Italy) Emanuele Busnelli (Italy) Marcello Zani	Porsche 997 GT3-RSR	MI	62
18	GT2	74	(Italy) Ebimotors	(Italy) Emanuele Busnelli (Italy) Marcello Zani	Porsche 3.8L Flat-6	MI	62
19	GT1; C	20	(Belgium) PSI Experience	(France) Gilles Vannelet (Austria) Klaus Engelhorn	Chevrolet Corvette C5-R	P	62
19	GT1; C	20	(Belgium) PSI Experience	(France) Gilles Vannelet (Austria) Klaus Engelhorn	Chevrolet 7.0L V8	P	62
20	GT2	53	(Italy) Racing Team Edil Cris	(Italy) Matteo Cressoni (Italy) Michele Rugolo	Ferrari F430 GT2	P	62
20	GT2	53	(Italy) Racing Team Edil Cris	(Italy) Matteo Cressoni (Italy) Michele Rugolo	Ferrari 4.0L V8	P	62
21	GT2	99	(United Kingdom) Tech9 Motorsport	(Russia) Leo Machitski (United Kingdom) Sean Edwards	Porsche 997 GT3-RSR	MI	62
21	GT2	99	(United Kingdom) Tech9 Motorsport	(Russia) Leo Machitski (United Kingdom) Sean Edwards	Porsche 3.8L Flat-6	MI	62
22	GT2	62	(United Kingdom) Scuderia Ecosse	(United Kingdom) Tim Mullen (Czech Republic) Tomáš Enge	Ferrari F430 GT2	P	62
22	GT2	62	(United Kingdom) Scuderia Ecosse	(United Kingdom) Tim Mullen (Czech Republic) Tomáš Enge	Ferrari 4.0L V8	P	62
23	GT2	60	(Belgium) Prospeed Competition	(Belgium) Rudi Penders (Belgium) Franz Lamot	Porsche 997 GT3-RSR	MI	60
23	GT2	60	(Belgium) Prospeed Competition	(Belgium) Rudi Penders (Belgium) Franz Lamot	Porsche 3.8L Flat-6	MI	60
24	GT1; C	15	(Monaco) JMB Racing	(Netherlands) Dirk Waaijenberg (Netherlands) Peter Kutemann	Maserati MC12 GT1	MI	60
24	GT1; C	15	(Monaco) JMB Racing	(Netherlands) Dirk Waaijenberg (Netherlands) Peter Kutemann	Maserati 6.0L V12	MI	60
25	**G2; C**	**102**	**(France) Red Racing**	**(Luxembourg) Sébastien Carcone (Luxembourg) Thierry Stepec**	**Chrysler Viper GTS-R**	MI	**55**
25	**G2; C**	**102**	**(France) Red Racing**	**(Luxembourg) Sébastien Carcone (Luxembourg) Thierry Stepec**	**Chrysler 8.0L V10**	MI	**55**
26	GT2	63	(United Kingdom) Scuderia Ecosse	(Canada) Chris Niarchos (United Kingdom) Andrew Kirkaldy	Ferrari F430 GT2	P	46
26	GT2	63	(United Kingdom) Scuderia Ecosse	(Canada) Chris Niarchos (United Kingdom) Andrew Kirkaldy	Ferrari 4.0L V8	P	46
27 DNF	GT2	97	(Italy) BMS Scuderia Italia	(France) Emmanuel Collard (Italy) Matteo Malucelli	Porsche 997 GT3-RSR	P	28
27 DNF	GT2	97	(Italy) BMS Scuderia Italia	(France) Emmanuel Collard (Italy) Matteo Malucelli	Porsche 3.8L Flat-6	P	28
28 DNF	GT1	7	(Germany) All-Inkl.com Racing	(France) Christophe Bouchut (Germany) Stefan Mücke	Lamborghini Murciélago R-GT	MI	22
28 DNF	GT1	7	(Germany) All-Inkl.com Racing	(France) Christophe Bouchut (Germany) Stefan Mücke	Lamborghini 6.0L V12	MI	22
DNS	GT1; C	14	(France) Solution F	(France) François Jakubowski (Switzerland) François Labhardt	Ferrari 550-GTS Maranello	MI	–
DNS	GT1; C	14	(France) Solution F	(France) François Jakubowski (Switzerland) François Labhardt	Ferrari 5.9L V12	MI	–
DNS	GT1; C	21	(Switzerland) Kessel Racing	(Switzerland) Loris Kessel (Italy) Lorenzo Casè	Ferrari 575-GTC Maranello	MI	–
DNS	GT1; C	21	(Switzerland) Kessel Racing	(Switzerland) Loris Kessel (Italy) Lorenzo Casè	Ferrari 6.0L V12	MI	–

== Statistics ==
- Pole Position – #33 JetAlliance Racing – 1:44.945
- Average Speed – 190.48 km/h

FIA GT Championship
Previous race: 2007 FIA GT Bucharest 2 Hours	2007 season	Next race: 2007 FIA GT Oschersleben 2 Hours
