= 2007 FIA GT Bucharest 2 Hours =

The layout of the Bucharest Ring

The 2007 FIA GT Vodafone Bucharest Challenge was the third race of the 2007 FIA GT Championship season and was organised by City Challenge GmbH. It took place on May 20, 2007.

It is only the second temporary street course run by the FIA GT Championship since its inception. The circuit, known as the Bucharest Ring, runs around the Palace of Parliament in the Romanian capital.

== Official results ==
Class winners in bold. Cars failing to complete 75% of winner's distance marked as Not Classified (NC). Cars with a C under their class are running in the Citation Cup, with the winner marked in bold italics.

Pos	Class	No	Team	Drivers	Chassis	Tyre	Laps
Pos	Class	No	Team	Drivers	Engine	Tyre	Laps
1	**GT1**	**11**	**(Italy) Scuderia Playteam Sarafree**	**(Italy) Andrea Bertolini (Italy) Andrea Piccini**	**Maserati MC12 GT1**	P	**72**
1	**GT1**	**11**	**(Italy) Scuderia Playteam Sarafree**	**(Italy) Andrea Bertolini (Italy) Andrea Piccini**	**Maserati 6.0L V12**	P	**72**
2	GT1	7	(Germany) All-Inkl.com Racing	(France) Christophe Bouchut (Germany) Stefan Mücke	Lamborghini Murcielago R-GT	MI	72
2	GT1	7	(Germany) All-Inkl.com Racing	(France) Christophe Bouchut (Germany) Stefan Mücke	Lamborghini 6.0L V12	MI	72
3	GT1	2	(Germany) Vitaphone Racing Team	(Portugal) Miguel Ramos (San Marino) Christian Montanari	Maserati MC12 GT1	MI	72
3	GT1	2	(Germany) Vitaphone Racing Team	(Portugal) Miguel Ramos (San Marino) Christian Montanari	Maserati 6.0L V12	MI	72
4	GT1	33	(Austria) Jetalliance Racing	(Austria) Karl Wendlinger (United Kingdom) Ryan Sharp	Aston Martin DBR9	MI	72
4	GT1	33	(Austria) Jetalliance Racing	(Austria) Karl Wendlinger (United Kingdom) Ryan Sharp	Aston Martin 6.0L V12	MI	72
5	GT1	4	(Belgium) PK Carsport	(Belgium) Anthony Kumpen (Belgium) Bert Longin	Chevrolet Corvette C5-R	MI	71
5	GT1	4	(Belgium) PK Carsport	(Belgium) Anthony Kumpen (Belgium) Bert Longin	Chevrolet 7.0L V8	MI	71
6	**GT2**	**50**	**(Italy) AF Corse Motorola**	**(Finland) Toni Vilander (Germany) Dirk Müller**	**Ferrari F430 GT2**	MI	**71**
6	**GT2**	**50**	**(Italy) AF Corse Motorola**	**(Finland) Toni Vilander (Germany) Dirk Müller**	**Ferrari 4.0L V8**	MI	**71**
7	GT1	1	(Germany) Vitaphone Racing Team	(Italy) Fabrizio Gollin (Italy) Thomas Biagi	Maserati MC12 GT1	MI	70
7	GT1	1	(Germany) Vitaphone Racing Team	(Italy) Fabrizio Gollin (Italy) Thomas Biagi	Maserati 6.0L V12	MI	70
8	GT2	97	(Italy) BMS Scuderia Italia	(France) Emmanuel Collard (Italy) Matteo Malucelli	Porsche 997 GT3-RSR	P	70
8	GT2	97	(Italy) BMS Scuderia Italia	(France) Emmanuel Collard (Italy) Matteo Malucelli	Porsche 3.8L Flat-6	P	70
9	GT1	23	(Italy) Aston Martin Racing BMS	(United Kingdom) Jamie Davies (Italy) Fabio Babini	Aston Martin DBR9	P	69
9	GT1	23	(Italy) Aston Martin Racing BMS	(United Kingdom) Jamie Davies (Italy) Fabio Babini	Aston Martin 6.0L V12	P	69
10	GT2	66	(Germany) Team Felbermayr-Proton	(Austria) Horst Felbermayr Jr. (Germany) Marc Lieb	Porsche 911 GT3-RS	P	69
10	GT2	66	(Germany) Team Felbermayr-Proton	(Austria) Horst Felbermayr Jr. (Germany) Marc Lieb	Porsche 3.6L Flat-6	P	69
11	**G2**	**101**	**(Belgium) Belgian Racing**	**(Belgium) Bas Leinders (Belgium) Renaud Kuppens**	**Gillet Vertigo Streiff**	MI	**69**
11	**G2**	**101**	**(Belgium) Belgian Racing**	**(Belgium) Bas Leinders (Belgium) Renaud Kuppens**	**Alfa Romeo 3.6L V6**	MI	**69**
12	GT2	74	(Italy) Ebimotors	(Italy) Emanuele Busnelli (Italy) Marcello Zani	Porsche 997 GT3-RSR	MI	68
12	GT2	74	(Italy) Ebimotors	(Italy) Emanuele Busnelli (Italy) Marcello Zani	Porsche 3.8L Flat-6	MI	68
13	GT2	62	(United Kingdom) Scuderia Ecosse	(United Kingdom) Tim Mullen (United Kingdom) Andrew Kirkaldy	Ferrari F430 GT2	P	68
13	GT2	62	(United Kingdom) Scuderia Ecosse	(United Kingdom) Tim Mullen (United Kingdom) Andrew Kirkaldy	Ferrari 4.0L V8	P	68
14	**GT1; C**	**18**	**(Belgium) Selleslagh Racing Team**	**(Belgium) Tom Cloet (France) Gilles Vannelet**	**Chevrolet Corvette C5-R**	MI	**67**
14	**GT1; C**	**18**	**(Belgium) Selleslagh Racing Team**	**(Belgium) Tom Cloet (France) Gilles Vannelet**	**Chevrolet 7.0L V8**	MI	**67**
15	GT2	53	(Italy) Racing Team Edil Cris	(Italy) Matteo Cressoni (Italy) Michele Rugolo	Ferrari F430 GT2	P	66
15	GT2	53	(Italy) Racing Team Edil Cris	(Italy) Matteo Cressoni (Italy) Michele Rugolo	Ferrari 4.0L V8	P	66
16	GT1; C	16	(Monaco) JMB Racing	(United Kingdom) Joe Macari (United Kingdom) Ben Aucott	Maserati MC12 GT1	MI	66
16	GT1; C	16	(Monaco) JMB Racing	(United Kingdom) Joe Macari (United Kingdom) Ben Aucott	Maserati 6.0L V12	MI	66
17	GT2	69	(Germany) Team Felbermayr-Proton	(Austria) Horst Felbermayr Sr. (Germany) Christian Ried	Porsche 911 GT3-RS	P	63
17	GT2	69	(Germany) Team Felbermayr-Proton	(Austria) Horst Felbermayr Sr. (Germany) Christian Ried	Porsche 3.6L Flat-6	P	63
18	GT1; C	15	(Monaco) JMB Racing	(Netherlands) Dirk Waaijenberg (Netherlands) Peter Kutemann	Maserati MC12 GT1	MI	62
18	GT1; C	15	(Monaco) JMB Racing	(Netherlands) Dirk Waaijenberg (Netherlands) Peter Kutemann	Maserati 6.0L V12	MI	62
19 DNF	GT1	5	(Netherlands) Carsport Holland (Germany) Phoenix Racing	(Netherlands) Mike Hezemans (Switzerland) Jean-Denis Délétraz	Chevrolet Corvette C6.R	MI	42
19 DNF	GT1	5	(Netherlands) Carsport Holland (Germany) Phoenix Racing	(Netherlands) Mike Hezemans (Switzerland) Jean-Denis Délétraz	Chevrolet 7.0L V8	MI	42
20 DNF	GT2	99	(United Kingdom) Tech9 Motorsport	(Russia) Leo Machitski (United Kingdom) Sean Edwards	Porsche 997 GT3-RSR	MI	42
20 DNF	GT2	99	(United Kingdom) Tech9 Motorsport	(Russia) Leo Machitski (United Kingdom) Sean Edwards	Porsche 3.8L Flat-6	MI	42
21 DNF	GT1	8	(Germany) All-Inkl.com Racing	(Netherlands) Jos Menten (Netherlands) Peter Kox	Lamborghini Murcielago R-GT	MI	33
21 DNF	GT1	8	(Germany) All-Inkl.com Racing	(Netherlands) Jos Menten (Netherlands) Peter Kox	Lamborghini 6.0L V12	MI	33
22 DNF	GT1	12	(Italy) Scuderia Playteam Sarafree	(Italy) Giambattista Giannoccaro (Italy) Alessandro Pier Guidi	Maserati MC12 GT1	P	30
22 DNF	GT1	12	(Italy) Scuderia Playteam Sarafree	(Italy) Giambattista Giannoccaro (Italy) Alessandro Pier Guidi	Maserati 6.0L V12	P	30
23 DNF	GT1	22	(Italy) Aston Martin Racing BMS	(Italy) Enrico Toccacelo (Italy) Ferdinando Monfardini	Aston Martin DBR9	P	24
23 DNF	GT1	22	(Italy) Aston Martin Racing BMS	(Italy) Enrico Toccacelo (Italy) Ferdinando Monfardini	Aston Martin 6.0L V12	P	24
24 DNF	GT1	36	(Austria) Jetalliance Racing	(Austria) Lukas Lichtner-Hoyer (Austria) Robert Lechner	Aston Martin DBR9	MI	10
24 DNF	GT1	36	(Austria) Jetalliance Racing	(Austria) Lukas Lichtner-Hoyer (Austria) Robert Lechner	Aston Martin 6.0L V12	MI	10
25 DNF	GT1; C	21	(Switzerland) Kessel Racing	(Switzerland) Loris Kessel (Italy) Lorenzo Casè	Ferrari 575-GTC Maranello	MI	9
25 DNF	GT1; C	21	(Switzerland) Kessel Racing	(Switzerland) Loris Kessel (Italy) Lorenzo Casè	Ferrari 6.0L V12	MI	9
26 DNF	GT2	63	(United Kingdom) Scuderia Ecosse	(Canada) Chris Niarchos (Czech Republic) Jaroslav Janiš	Ferrari F430 GT2	P	5
26 DNF	GT2	63	(United Kingdom) Scuderia Ecosse	(Canada) Chris Niarchos (Czech Republic) Jaroslav Janiš	Ferrari 4.0L V8	P	5
27 DNF	GT2	52	(Italy) Racing Team Edil Cris	(Italy) Paolo Ruberti (Italy) Massimiliano Mugelli	Ferrari F430 GT2	P	3
27 DNF	GT2	52	(Italy) Racing Team Edil Cris	(Italy) Paolo Ruberti (Italy) Massimiliano Mugelli	Ferrari 4.0L V8	P	3
DNS	GT2	51	(Italy) AF Corse Motorola	(Italy) Gianmaria Bruni (Monaco) Stéphane Ortelli	Ferrari F430 GT2	MI	–
DNS	GT2	51	(Italy) AF Corse Motorola	(Italy) Gianmaria Bruni (Monaco) Stéphane Ortelli	Ferrari 4.0L V8	MI	–

== Statistics ==
- Pole Position – #12 Scuderia Playteam Sarafree – 1:14.214
- Average Speed – 111.11 km/h

FIA GT Championship
Previous race: 2007 FIA GT Tourist Trophy	2007 season	Next race: 2007 FIA GT Monza 2 Hours
