= 2007 FIA GT Zhuhai 2 Hours =

The Track map of Zhuhai International Circuit

The 2007 FIA GT Zhuhai 2 Hours was the opening race of the 2007 FIA GT Championship season. It took place on March 25, 2007. Over 22,000 paying spectators plus another 1,000 VIPs attended the race in person.

This raced marked the first time Lamborghini scored an overall victory in an international racing series, with the All-Inkl.com Racing Lamborghini Murciélago R-GT taking the win.

== Official results ==
Class winners in bold. Cars failing to complete 75% of winner's distance marked as Not Classified (NC).

Pos	Class	No	Team	Drivers	Chassis	Tyre	Laps
Pos	Class	No	Team	Drivers	Engine	Tyre	Laps
1	**GT1**	**7**	**(Germany) All-Inkl.com Racing**	**(France) Christophe Bouchut (Germany) Stefan Mücke**	**Lamborghini Murciélago R-GT**	MI	**69**
1	**GT1**	**7**	**(Germany) All-Inkl.com Racing**	**(France) Christophe Bouchut (Germany) Stefan Mücke**	**Lamborghini 6.0L V12**	MI	**69**
2	GT1	19	(Belgium) PSI Experience	(United Kingdom) Luke Hines (Austria) Philipp Peter	Chevrolet Corvette C6.R	MI	69
2	GT1	19	(Belgium) PSI Experience	(United Kingdom) Luke Hines (Austria) Philipp Peter	Chevrolet 7.0L V8	MI	69
3	GT1	4	(Belgium) PK Carsport	(Belgium) Anthony Kumpen (Belgium) Bert Longin	Chevrolet Corvette C5-R	MI	69
3	GT1	4	(Belgium) PK Carsport	(Belgium) Anthony Kumpen (Belgium) Bert Longin	Chevrolet 7.0L V8	MI	69
4	GT1	23	(Italy) Aston Martin Racing BMS	(United Kingdom) Jamie Davies (Italy) Fabio Babini	Aston Martin DBR9	P	69
4	GT1	23	(Italy) Aston Martin Racing BMS	(United Kingdom) Jamie Davies (Italy) Fabio Babini	Aston Martin 6.0L V12	P	69
5	GT1	5	(Netherlands) Carsport Holland (Germany) Phoenix Racing	(Netherlands) Mike Hezemans (Switzerland) Jean-Denis Délétraz	Chevrolet Corvette C6.R	MI	69
5	GT1	5	(Netherlands) Carsport Holland (Germany) Phoenix Racing	(Netherlands) Mike Hezemans (Switzerland) Jean-Denis Délétraz	Chevrolet 7.0L V8	MI	69
6	GT1	1	(Germany) Vitaphone Racing Team	(Germany) Michael Bartels^{†} (Italy) Thomas Biagi	Maserati MC12 GT1	MI	69
6	GT1	1	(Germany) Vitaphone Racing Team	(Germany) Michael Bartels^{†} (Italy) Thomas Biagi	Maserati 6.0L V12	MI	69
7	GT1	2	(Germany) Vitaphone Racing Team	(Portugal) Miguel Ramos (San Marino) Christian Montanari	Maserati MC12 GT1	MI	69
7	GT1	2	(Germany) Vitaphone Racing Team	(Portugal) Miguel Ramos (San Marino) Christian Montanari	Maserati 6.0L V12	MI	69
8	GT1	17	(United Kingdom) Barwell Motorsports	(United Kingdom) Jonny Kane (United Kingdom) Jonathan Cocker	Aston Martin DBR9	MI	68
8	GT1	17	(United Kingdom) Barwell Motorsports	(United Kingdom) Jonny Kane (United Kingdom) Jonathan Cocker	Aston Martin 6.0L V12	MI	68
9	GT1	33	(Austria) Jetalliance Racing	(Austria) Karl Wendlinger (United Kingdom) Ryan Sharp	Aston Martin DBR9	MI	68
9	GT1	33	(Austria) Jetalliance Racing	(Austria) Karl Wendlinger (United Kingdom) Ryan Sharp	Aston Martin 6.0L V12	MI	68
10	**GT2**	**50**	**(Italy) AF Corse Motorola**	**(Finland) Toni Vilander (Germany) Dirk Müller**	**Ferrari F430 GT2**	MI	**68**
10	**GT2**	**50**	**(Italy) AF Corse Motorola**	**(Finland) Toni Vilander (Germany) Dirk Müller**	**Ferrari 4.0L V8**	MI	**68**
11	GT1	22	(Italy) Aston Martin Racing BMS	(Switzerland) Giorgio Mondini (Italy) Ferdinando Monfardini	Aston Martin DBR9	P	68
11	GT1	22	(Italy) Aston Martin Racing BMS	(Switzerland) Giorgio Mondini (Italy) Ferdinando Monfardini	Aston Martin 6.0L V12	P	68
12	GT1	8	(Germany) All-Inkl.com Racing	(Netherlands) Jos Menten (Netherlands) Peter Kox	Lamborghini Murciélago R-GT	MI	67
12	GT1	8	(Germany) All-Inkl.com Racing	(Netherlands) Jos Menten (Netherlands) Peter Kox	Lamborghini 6.0L V12	MI	67
13	GT2	51	(Italy) AF Corse Motorola	(Italy) Gianmaria Bruni (Monaco) Stéphane Ortelli	Ferrari F430 GT2	MI	67
13	GT2	51	(Italy) AF Corse Motorola	(Italy) Gianmaria Bruni (Monaco) Stéphane Ortelli	Ferrari 4.0L V8	MI	67
14	GT2	62	(United Kingdom) Scuderia Ecosse	(United Kingdom) Tim Mullen (Czech Republic) Tomáš Enge	Ferrari F430 GT2	P	67
14	GT2	62	(United Kingdom) Scuderia Ecosse	(United Kingdom) Tim Mullen (Czech Republic) Tomáš Enge	Ferrari 4.0L V8	P	67
15	GT1	36	(Austria) Jetalliance Racing	(Austria) Lukas Lichtner-Hoyer (Austria) Robert Lechner	Aston Martin DBR9	MI	66
15	GT1	36	(Austria) Jetalliance Racing	(Austria) Lukas Lichtner-Hoyer (Austria) Robert Lechner	Aston Martin 6.0L V12	MI	66
16	GT1	16	(Monaco) JMB Racing	(United Kingdom) Joe Macari (United Kingdom) Ben Aucott	Maserati MC12 GT1	MI	66
16	GT1	16	(Monaco) JMB Racing	(United Kingdom) Joe Macari (United Kingdom) Ben Aucott	Maserati 6.0L V12	MI	66
17	GT2	74	(Italy) Ebimotors	(Italy) Emanuele Busnelli (Italy) Marcello Zani	Porsche 997 GT3-RSR	MI	66
17	GT2	74	(Italy) Ebimotors	(Italy) Emanuele Busnelli (Italy) Marcello Zani	Porsche 3.8L Flat-6	MI	66
18	GT2	63	(United Kingdom) Scuderia Ecosse	(Canada) Chris Niarchos (United Kingdom) Andrew Kirkaldy	Ferrari F430 GT2	P	65
18	GT2	63	(United Kingdom) Scuderia Ecosse	(Canada) Chris Niarchos (United Kingdom) Andrew Kirkaldy	Ferrari 4.0L V8	P	65
19	GT2	99	(United Kingdom) Tech9 Motorsport	(Russia) Leo Machitski (United Kingdom) Sean Edwards	Porsche 997 GT3-RSR	MI	65
19	GT2	99	(United Kingdom) Tech9 Motorsport	(Russia) Leo Machitski (United Kingdom) Sean Edwards	Porsche 3.8L Flat-6	MI	65
20 DNF	G2	101	(Belgium) Belgian Racing	(Belgium) Bas Leinders (Belgium) Renaud Kuppens	Gillet Vertigo Streiff	MI	41
20 DNF	G2	101	(Belgium) Belgian Racing	(Belgium) Bas Leinders (Belgium) Renaud Kuppens	Alfa Romeo 3.6L V6	MI	41
21 DNF	GT1	11	(Italy) Scuderia Playteam Sarafree	(Italy) Andrea Bertolini (Italy) Andrea Piccini	Maserati MC12 GT1	P	31
21 DNF	GT1	11	(Italy) Scuderia Playteam Sarafree	(Italy) Andrea Bertolini (Italy) Andrea Piccini	Maserati 6.0L V12	P	31
22 DNF	GT1	12	(Italy) Scuderia Playteam Sarafree	(Italy) Giambattista Giannoccaro (Italy) Alessandro Pier Guidi	Maserati MC12 GT1	P	30
22 DNF	GT1	12	(Italy) Scuderia Playteam Sarafree	(Italy) Giambattista Giannoccaro (Italy) Alessandro Pier Guidi	Maserati 6.0L V12	P	30
23 DNF	GT2	69	(Germany) Team Felbermayr-Proton	(Germany) Gerold Ried (Germany) Marc Basseng	Porsche 911 GT3-RSR	P	5
23 DNF	GT2	69	(Germany) Team Felbermayr-Proton	(Germany) Gerold Ried (Germany) Marc Basseng	Porsche 3.6L Flat-6	P	5
DSQ^{‡}	GT2	97	(Italy) BMS Scuderia Italia	(France) Emmanuel Collard (Italy) Matteo Malucelli	Porsche 997 GT3-RSR	P	68
DSQ^{‡}	GT2	97	(Italy) BMS Scuderia Italia	(France) Emmanuel Collard (Italy) Matteo Malucelli	Porsche 3.8L Flat-6	P	68

† – Michael Bartels was excluded from the results for driving less than 35 minutes.

‡ – #97 BMS Scuderia Italia was excluded from the results for failing post-race inspection due to a lower than legal ride height.

== Statistics ==
- Pole Position – #1 Vitaphone Racing Team – 1:31.339
- Average Speed – 147.92 km/h

FIA GT Championship
Previous race: None	2007 season	Next race: 2007 FIA GT Tourist Trophy
