= 2007 FIA GT Zolder 2 Hours =

Layout of the Circuit Zolder

The 2007 FIA GT Zolder 2 Hours was the tenth and final race of the 2007 FIA GT Championship season. It took place at Circuit Zolder, Belgium, on October 21, 2007.

== Unofficial results ==
Class winners in bold. Cars failing to complete 75% of winner's distance marked as Not Classified (NC). Cars with a C under their class are running in the Citation Cup, with the winner marked in bold italics.

Pos	Class	No	Team	Drivers	Chassis	Tyre	Laps
Pos	Class	No	Team	Drivers	Engine	Tyre	Laps
1	**GT1**	**33**	**(Austria) Jetalliance Racing**	**(Austria) Karl Wendlinger (United Kingdom) Ryan Sharp**	**Aston Martin DBR9**	MI	**79**
1	**GT1**	**33**	**(Austria) Jetalliance Racing**	**(Austria) Karl Wendlinger (United Kingdom) Ryan Sharp**	**Aston Martin 6.0L V12**	MI	**79**
2	GT1	4	(Belgium) PK Carsport	(Belgium) Anthony Kumpen (Belgium) Bert Longin	Chevrolet Corvette C5-R	MI	79
2	GT1	4	(Belgium) PK Carsport	(Belgium) Anthony Kumpen (Belgium) Bert Longin	Chevrolet LS7-R 7.0L V8	MI	79
3	GT1	1	(Germany) Vitaphone Racing Team	(Germany) Michael Bartels (Italy) Thomas Biagi	Maserati MC12 GT1	MI	79
3	GT1	1	(Germany) Vitaphone Racing Team	(Germany) Michael Bartels (Italy) Thomas Biagi	Maserati 6.0L V12	MI	79
4	GT1	5	(Netherlands) Carsport Holland (Germany) Phoenix Racing	(Netherlands) Mike Hezemans (Switzerland) Jean-Denis Délétraz	Chevrolet Corvette C6.R	MI	79
4	GT1	5	(Netherlands) Carsport Holland (Germany) Phoenix Racing	(Netherlands) Mike Hezemans (Switzerland) Jean-Denis Délétraz	Chevrolet LS7-R 7.0L V8	MI	79
5	GT1	2	(Germany) Vitaphone Racing Team	(Portugal) Miguel Ramos (San Marino) Christian Montanari	Maserati MC12 GT1	MI	79
5	GT1	2	(Germany) Vitaphone Racing Team	(Portugal) Miguel Ramos (San Marino) Christian Montanari	Maserati 6.0L V12	MI	79
6	GT1	28	(Germany) Reiter Engineering	(Netherlands) Peter Kox (Netherlands) Jos Menten	Lamborghini Murciélago R-GT	MI	79
6	GT1	28	(Germany) Reiter Engineering	(Netherlands) Peter Kox (Netherlands) Jos Menten	Lamborghini 6.0L V12	MI	79
7	GT1	22	(Italy) Aston Martin Racing BMS	(Italy) Ferdinando Monfardini (France) Jean-Marc Gounon	Aston Martin DBR9	P	79
7	GT1	22	(Italy) Aston Martin Racing BMS	(Italy) Ferdinando Monfardini (France) Jean-Marc Gounon	Aston Martin 6.0L V12	P	79
8	GT1	11	(Italy) Scuderia Playteam Sarafree	(Italy) Andrea Bertolini (Italy) Andrea Piccini	Maserati MC12 GT1	P	78
8	GT1	11	(Italy) Scuderia Playteam Sarafree	(Italy) Andrea Bertolini (Italy) Andrea Piccini	Maserati 6.0L V12	P	78
9	GT1	36	(Austria) Jetalliance Racing	(Austria) Lukas Lichtner-Hoyer (Austria) Robert Lechner	Aston Martin DBR9	MI	77
9	GT1	36	(Austria) Jetalliance Racing	(Austria) Lukas Lichtner-Hoyer (Austria) Robert Lechner	Aston Martin 6.0L V12	MI	77
10	**GT1; C**	**16**	**(Monaco) JMB Racing**	**(United Kingdom) Ben Aucott (France) Stéphane Daoudi**	**Maserati MC12 GT1**	MI	**76**
10	**GT1; C**	**16**	**(Monaco) JMB Racing**	**(United Kingdom) Ben Aucott (France) Stéphane Daoudi**	**Maserati 6.0L V12**	MI	**76**
11	GT1; C	18	(Belgium) Selleslagh Racing Team	(Belgium) Tom Cloet (Belgium) Maxime Soulet	Chevrolet Corvette C5-R	MI	76
11	GT1; C	18	(Belgium) Selleslagh Racing Team	(Belgium) Tom Cloet (Belgium) Maxime Soulet	Chevrolet LS7-R 7.0L V8	MI	76
12	**GT2**	**50**	**(Italy) AF Corse Motorola**	**(Finland) Toni Vilander (Germany) Dirk Müller**	**Ferrari F430 GT2**	MI	**76**
12	**GT2**	**50**	**(Italy) AF Corse Motorola**	**(Finland) Toni Vilander (Germany) Dirk Müller**	**Ferrari 4.0L V8**	MI	**76**
13	GT2	74	(Italy) Ebimotors	(Italy) Marcello Zani (France) Xavier Pompidou	Porsche 997 GT3-RSR	MI	76
13	GT2	74	(Italy) Ebimotors	(Italy) Marcello Zani (France) Xavier Pompidou	Porsche 3.8L Flat-6	MI	76
14	GT2	59	(Italy) Advanced Engineering	(Italy) Maurizio Mediani (Portugal) Rui Águas	Ferrari F430 GT2	MI	76
14	GT2	59	(Italy) Advanced Engineering	(Italy) Maurizio Mediani (Portugal) Rui Águas	Ferrari 4.0L V8	MI	76
15	GT2	97	(Italy) BMS Scuderia Italia	(France) Emmanuel Collard (Italy) Matteo Malucelli	Porsche 997 GT3-RSR	P	76
15	GT2	97	(Italy) BMS Scuderia Italia	(France) Emmanuel Collard (Italy) Matteo Malucelli	Porsche 3.8L Flat-6	P	76
16	GT2	51	(Italy) AF Corse Motorola	(Italy) Gianmaria Bruni (Monaco) Stéphane Ortelli	Ferrari F430 GT2	MI	76
16	GT2	51	(Italy) AF Corse Motorola	(Italy) Gianmaria Bruni (Monaco) Stéphane Ortelli	Ferrari 4.0L V8	MI	76
17	GT2	63	(United Kingdom) Scuderia Ecosse	(United Kingdom) Tim Sugden (United Kingdom) Andrew Kirkaldy	Ferrari F430 GT2	P	76
17	GT2	63	(United Kingdom) Scuderia Ecosse	(United Kingdom) Tim Sugden (United Kingdom) Andrew Kirkaldy	Ferrari 4.0L V8	P	76
18	GT2	62	(United Kingdom) Scuderia Ecosse	(United Kingdom) Tim Mullen (United Kingdom) Darren Turner	Ferrari F430 GT2	P	75
18	GT2	62	(United Kingdom) Scuderia Ecosse	(United Kingdom) Tim Mullen (United Kingdom) Darren Turner	Ferrari 4.0L V8	P	75
19	GT2	60	(Belgium) Prospeed Competition	(Germany) Marc Lieb (Germany) Marc Basseng	Porsche 997 GT3-RSR	MI	74
19	GT2	60	(Belgium) Prospeed Competition	(Germany) Marc Lieb (Germany) Marc Basseng	Porsche 3.8L Flat-6	MI	74
20	**G2**	**101**	**(Belgium) Belgian Racing**	**(Belgium) Bas Leinders (Belgium) Renaud Kuppens**	**Gillet Vertigo Streiff**	P	**74**
20	**G2**	**101**	**(Belgium) Belgian Racing**	**(Belgium) Bas Leinders (Belgium) Renaud Kuppens**	**Alfa Romeo 3.6L V6**	P	**74**
21	GT1	7	(Germany) All-Inkl.com Racing	(France) Christophe Bouchut (Belgium) Marc Duez	Lamborghini Murciélago R-GT	MI	72
21	GT1	7	(Germany) All-Inkl.com Racing	(France) Christophe Bouchut (Belgium) Marc Duez	Lamborghini 6.0L V12	MI	72
22	GT1; C	15	(Monaco) JMB Racing	(Netherlands) Peter Kutemann (Netherlands) Dirk Waaijenberg	Maserati MC12 GT1	MI	72
22	GT1; C	15	(Monaco) JMB Racing	(Netherlands) Peter Kutemann (Netherlands) Dirk Waaijenberg	Maserati 6.0L V12	MI	72
23 DNF	GT1	19	(Belgium) PSI Experience	(Belgium) Loïc Deman (Belgium) Stef Van Campenhoudt	Chevrolet Corvette C6.R	MI	42
23 DNF	GT1	19	(Belgium) PSI Experience	(Belgium) Loïc Deman (Belgium) Stef Van Campenhoudt	Chevrolet LS7-R 7.0L V8	MI	42
24 DNF	GT1	9	(Germany) Phoenix Racing	(Italy) Fabrizio Gollin (Switzerland) Marcel Fässler	Aston Martin DBR9	MI	29
24 DNF	GT1	9	(Germany) Phoenix Racing	(Italy) Fabrizio Gollin (Switzerland) Marcel Fässler	Aston Martin 6.0L V12	MI	29
25 DNF	GT1	10	(United Kingdom) Gigawave Motorsport (United Kingdom) Barwell Motorsports	(United Kingdom) Luke Hines (Austria) Philipp Peter	Aston Martin DBR9	MI	24
25 DNF	GT1	10	(United Kingdom) Gigawave Motorsport (United Kingdom) Barwell Motorsports	(United Kingdom) Luke Hines (Austria) Philipp Peter	Aston Martin 6.0L V12	MI	24
26 DNF	GT1	12	(Italy) Scuderia Playteam Sarafree	(Italy) Giambattista Giannoccaro (Italy) Alessandro Pier Guidi	Maserati MC12 GT1	P	18
26 DNF	GT1	12	(Italy) Scuderia Playteam Sarafree	(Italy) Giambattista Giannoccaro (Italy) Alessandro Pier Guidi	Maserati 6.0L V12	P	18
27 DNF	GT1	23	(Italy) Aston Martin Racing BMS	(United Kingdom) Jamie Davies (Italy) Fabio Babini	Aston Martin DBR9	P	17
27 DNF	GT1	23	(Italy) Aston Martin Racing BMS	(United Kingdom) Jamie Davies (Italy) Fabio Babini	Aston Martin 6.0L V12	P	17

== Statistics ==
- Pole Position – #33 JetAlliance Racing – 1:25.812
- Average Speed – 157.54 km/h

FIA GT Championship
Previous race: 2007 FIA GT Nogaro 2 Hours	2007 season	Next race: None
