= Ceccato =

Ceccato is a surname. Notable people with the surname include:

- Aldo Ceccato (born 1934), Italian conductor
- Andrea Ceccato (born 1985), Italian rugby union player
- Enrico Ceccato (born 1986), Italian rugby union player
- Giuseppe Ceccato (born 1950), Venetist politician
- Silvio Ceccato (1914–1997), Italian philosopher and linguist
