= 2007 FIA GT Brno 2 Hours =

Layout of the Brno Circuit

The 2007 FIA GT Brno 2 Hours was the eighth race of the 2007 FIA GT Championship season. It took place at Masaryk Circuit, Czech Republic, on September 23, 2007.

== Official results ==
Class winners in bold. Cars failing to complete 75% of winner's distance marked as Not Classified (NC). Cars with a C under their class are running in the Citation Cup, with the winner marked in bold italics.

Pos	Class	No	Team	Drivers	Chassis	Tyre	Laps
Pos	Class	No	Team	Drivers	Engine	Tyre	Laps
1	**GT1**	**2**	**(Germany) Vitaphone Racing Team**	**(Portugal) Miguel Ramos (San Marino) Christian Montanari**	**Maserati MC12 GT1**	**MI**	**59**
1	**GT1**	**2**	**(Germany) Vitaphone Racing Team**	**(Portugal) Miguel Ramos (San Marino) Christian Montanari**	**Maserati 6.0L V12**	**MI**	**59**
2	GT1	33	(Austria) Jetalliance Racing	(Austria) Karl Wendlinger (United Kingdom) Ryan Sharp	Aston Martin DBR9	**MI**	59
2	GT1	33	(Austria) Jetalliance Racing	(Austria) Karl Wendlinger (United Kingdom) Ryan Sharp	Aston Martin 6.0L V12	**MI**	59
3	GT1	4	(Belgium) PK Carsport	(Belgium) Anthony Kumpen (Belgium) Bert Longin	Chevrolet Corvette C5-R	**MI**	59
3	GT1	4	(Belgium) PK Carsport	(Belgium) Anthony Kumpen (Belgium) Bert Longin	Chevrolet LS7-R 7.0L V8	**MI**	59
4	GT1	11	(Italy) Scuderia Playteam Sarafree	(Italy) Andrea Bertolini (Italy) Andrea Piccini	Maserati MC12 GT1	**P**	59
4	GT1	11	(Italy) Scuderia Playteam Sarafree	(Italy) Andrea Bertolini (Italy) Andrea Piccini	Maserati 6.0L V12	**P**	59
5	GT1	12	(Italy) Scuderia Playteam Sarafree	(Italy) Giambattista Giannoccaro (Italy) Alessandro Pier Guidi	Maserati MC12 GT1	**P**	59
5	GT1	12	(Italy) Scuderia Playteam Sarafree	(Italy) Giambattista Giannoccaro (Italy) Alessandro Pier Guidi	Maserati 6.0L V12	**P**	59
6	GT1	7	(Germany) All-Inkl.com Racing	(France) Christophe Bouchut (Germany) Stefan Mücke	Lamborghini Murcielago R-GT	**MI**	59
6	GT1	7	(Germany) All-Inkl.com Racing	(France) Christophe Bouchut (Germany) Stefan Mücke	Lamborghini 6.0L V12	**MI**	59
7	GT1	1	(Germany) Vitaphone Racing Team	(Germany) Michael Bartels (Italy) Thomas Biagi	Maserati MC12 GT1	**MI**	59
7	GT1	1	(Germany) Vitaphone Racing Team	(Germany) Michael Bartels (Italy) Thomas Biagi	Maserati 6.0L V12	**MI**	59
8	GT1	28	(Germany) Reiter Lamborghini	(Netherlands) Jos Menten (Netherlands) Peter Kox	Lamborghini Murcielago R-GT	**MI**	59
8	GT1	28	(Germany) Reiter Lamborghini	(Netherlands) Jos Menten (Netherlands) Peter Kox	Lamborghini 6.0L V12	**MI**	59
9	GT1	5	(Netherlands) Carsport Holland (Germany) Phoenix Racing	(Netherlands) Mike Hezemans (Switzerland) Jean-Denis Délétraz	Chevrolet Corvette C6.R	**MI**	59
9	GT1	5	(Netherlands) Carsport Holland (Germany) Phoenix Racing	(Netherlands) Mike Hezemans (Switzerland) Jean-Denis Délétraz	Chevrolet LS7-R 7.0L V8	**MI**	59
10	GT1	36	(Austria) Jetalliance Racing	(Austria) Lukas Lichtner-Hoyer (Austria) Robert Lechner	Aston Martin DBR9	**MI**	59
10	GT1	36	(Austria) Jetalliance Racing	(Austria) Lukas Lichtner-Hoyer (Austria) Robert Lechner	Aston Martin 6.0L V12	**MI**	59
11	GT1	23	(Italy) Aston Martin Racing BMS	(United Kingdom) Jamie Davies (Italy) Fabio Babini	Aston Martin DBR9	**P**	58
11	GT1	23	(Italy) Aston Martin Racing BMS	(United Kingdom) Jamie Davies (Italy) Fabio Babini	Aston Martin 6.0L V12	**P**	58
12	**GT1; C**	**16**	**(Monaco) JMB Racing**	**(United Kingdom) Ben Aucott (France) Alain Ferté**	**Maserati MC12 GT1**	**MI**	**57**
12	**GT1; C**	**16**	**(Monaco) JMB Racing**	**(United Kingdom) Ben Aucott (France) Alain Ferté**	**Maserati 6.0L V12**	**MI**	**57**
13	**GT2**	**50**	**(Italy) AF Corse Motorola**	**(Finland) Toni Vilander (Germany) Dirk Müller**	**Ferrari F430 GT2**	**MI**	**57**
13	**GT2**	**50**	**(Italy) AF Corse Motorola**	**(Finland) Toni Vilander (Germany) Dirk Müller**	**Ferrari 4.0L V8**	**MI**	**57**
14	GT2	51	(Italy) AF Corse Motorola	(Italy) Gianmaria Bruni (Monaco) Stéphane Ortelli	Ferrari F430 GT2	**MI**	57
14	GT2	51	(Italy) AF Corse Motorola	(Italy) Gianmaria Bruni (Monaco) Stéphane Ortelli	Ferrari 4.0L V8	**MI**	57
15	GT1	22	(Italy) Aston Martin Racing BMS	(Italy) Ferdinando Monfardini (Italy) Enrico Toccacelo	Aston Martin DBR9	**P**	57
15	GT1	22	(Italy) Aston Martin Racing BMS	(Italy) Ferdinando Monfardini (Italy) Enrico Toccacelo	Aston Martin 6.0L V12	**P**	57
16	GT2	62	(United Kingdom) Scuderia Ecosse	(United Kingdom) Tim Mullen (United Kingdom) Darren Turner	Ferrari F430 GT2	**P**	57
16	GT2	62	(United Kingdom) Scuderia Ecosse	(United Kingdom) Tim Mullen (United Kingdom) Darren Turner	Ferrari 4.0L V8	**P**	57
17	GT2	59	(Italy) Advanced Engineering	(Italy) Stefano Gattuso (Portugal) Rui Águas	Ferrari F430 GT2	**MI**	57
17	GT2	59	(Italy) Advanced Engineering	(Italy) Stefano Gattuso (Portugal) Rui Águas	Ferrari 4.0L V8	**MI**	57
18	GT2	97	(Italy) BMS Scuderia Italia	(France) Emmanuel Collard (Italy) Matteo Malucelli	Porsche 997 GT3-RSR	**P**	56
18	GT2	97	(Italy) BMS Scuderia Italia	(France) Emmanuel Collard (Italy) Matteo Malucelli	Porsche 3.8L Flat-6	**P**	56
19	GT2	74	(Italy) Ebimotors	(Italy) Marcello Zani (France) Xavier Pompidou	Porsche 997 GT3-RSR	**MI**	56
19	GT2	74	(Italy) Ebimotors	(Italy) Marcello Zani (France) Xavier Pompidou	Porsche 3.8L Flat-6	**MI**	56
20	**G2**	**108**	**(Slovakia) Autoracing Club Bratislava**	**(Slovakia) Miro Konopka (Slovakia) Miro Hornak**	**Saleen S7R**	?	**56**
20	**G2**	**108**	**(Slovakia) Autoracing Club Bratislava**	**(Slovakia) Miro Konopka (Slovakia) Miro Hornak**	**Ford 7.0L V8**	?	**56**
21	GT2	53	(Italy) Racing Team Edil Cris	(Italy) Matteo Cressoni (Italy) Luciano Linossi	Ferrari F430 GT2	**P**	56
21	GT2	53	(Italy) Racing Team Edil Cris	(Italy) Matteo Cressoni (Italy) Luciano Linossi	Ferrari 4.0L V8	**P**	56
22	GT1; C	15	(Monaco) JMB Racing	(Netherlands) Peter Kutemann (France) Antoine Gosse	Maserati MC12 GT1	**MI**	56
22	GT1; C	15	(Monaco) JMB Racing	(Netherlands) Peter Kutemann (France) Antoine Gosse	Maserati 6.0L V12	**MI**	56
23	GT1; C	18	(Belgium) Selleslagh Racing Team	(Belgium) Tom Cloet (Italy) Mauro Casadei	Chevrolet Corvette C5-R	**MI**	56
23	GT1; C	18	(Belgium) Selleslagh Racing Team	(Belgium) Tom Cloet (Italy) Mauro Casadei	Chevrolet LS7-R 7.0L V8	**MI**	56
24	GT2	63	(United Kingdom) Scuderia Ecosse	(Canada) Chris Niarchos (United Kingdom) Andrew Kirkaldy	Ferrari F430 GT2	**P**	56
24	GT2	63	(United Kingdom) Scuderia Ecosse	(Canada) Chris Niarchos (United Kingdom) Andrew Kirkaldy	Ferrari 4.0L V8	**P**	56
25	G2	101	(Belgium) Belgian Racing	(Belgium) Bas Leinders (Belgium) Renaud Kuppens	Gillet Vertigo Streiff	**P**	55
25	G2	101	(Belgium) Belgian Racing	(Belgium) Bas Leinders (Belgium) Renaud Kuppens	Alfa Romeo 3.6L V6	**P**	55
26	GT1	13	(Austria) RBImmo Racing Team (Germany) Konrad Motorsport	(Czech Republic) Tomáš Enge (Austria) Reinhard Kofler	Saleen S7R	**P**	53
26	GT1	13	(Austria) RBImmo Racing Team (Germany) Konrad Motorsport	(Czech Republic) Tomáš Enge (Austria) Reinhard Kofler	Ford 7.0L V8	**P**	53
27	**G3**	**178**	**(Germany) G-Private Racing**	**(Austria) Patrick Ortlieb (Austria) Martin Sagmeister**	**Porsche 997 GT3 Cup**	**MI**	**51**
27	**G3**	**178**	**(Germany) G-Private Racing**	**(Austria) Patrick Ortlieb (Austria) Martin Sagmeister**	**Porsche 3.8L Flat-6**	**MI**	**51**
28	G3	177	(Germany) G-Private Racing	(Austria) Otto Dragoun (Austria) Alois Mair	Porsche 997 GT3 Cup	**MI**	50
28	G3	177	(Germany) G-Private Racing	(Austria) Otto Dragoun (Austria) Alois Mair	Porsche 3.8L Flat-6	**MI**	50
29	GT2	99	(United Kingdom) Tech9 Motorsport	(Russia) Leo Machitski (United Kingdom) Sean Edwards	Porsche 997 GT3-RSR	**MI**	48
29	GT2	99	(United Kingdom) Tech9 Motorsport	(Russia) Leo Machitski (United Kingdom) Sean Edwards	Porsche 3.8L Flat-6	**MI**	48
DSQ^{†}	GT2	52	(Italy) Racing Team Edil Cris	(Italy) Paolo Ruberti (France) Damien Pasini	Ferrari F430 GT2	**P**	57
DSQ^{†}	GT2	52	(Italy) Racing Team Edil Cris	(Italy) Paolo Ruberti (France) Damien Pasini	Ferrari 4.0L V8	**P**	57

† – #52 Racing Team Edil Cris was disqualified for failing post-race technical inspection. The car was found to be below the legal ride height.

== Statistics ==
- Pole Position – #1 Vitaphone Racing Team – 1:54.064
- Average Speed – 159.21 km/h

FIA GT Championship
Previous race: 2007 FIA GT Adria 2 Hours	2007 season	Next race: 2007 FIA GT Nogaro 2 Hours
