= 2007 FIA GT Championship =

Motor racing season

Seasons
- ← 2006 2008 →

The 2007 FIA GT Championship was the 11th season of FIA GT Championship auto racing. It was a series for Grand Touring style cars competing in two classes, GT1 and GT2, the latter being less powerful and more closely related to road-going models. Cars from National Championships (Group 2) and GT3 cars (Group 3) were also allowed to compete, but were not eligible to score championship points. The series began on 25 March 2007 and ended 21 October 2007 after 10 races.

The GT1 Drivers Championship was won by Thomas Biagi driving a Maserati MC12 GT1 for the Vitaphone Racing Team and the GT1 Teams Championship by the Vitaphone Racing Team.

== Schedule ==
Rnd	Race	Circuit	Date
1	(China) Zhuhai 2 Hours	Zhuhai International Circuit	25 March
2	(United Kingdom) RAC Tourist Trophy (2 Hours)	Silverstone Circuit	6 May
3	(Romania) Vodafone Bucharest Challenge (2 Hours)	Bucharest Ring	20 May
4	(Italy) Monza 2 Hours	Autodromo Nazionale Monza	24 June
5	(Germany) Oschersleben 2 Hours	Motorsport Arena Oschersleben	8 July
6	(Belgium) Total 24 Hours of Spa	Circuit de Spa-Francorchamps	28 July; 29 July
7	(Italy) Adria 2 Hours	Adria International Raceway	8 September
8	(Czech Republic) Brno 2 Hours	Autodrom Brno Masaryk	23 September
9	(France) Grand Prix de Nogaro (2 Hours)	Circuit Paul Armagnac	30 September
10	(Belgium) Zolder 2 Hours	Zolder Circuit	21 October

The Brazilian Mil Milhas endurance race was originally announced by the SRO as being part of the 2007 season, but instead became part of the Le Mans Series schedule.

== Rule changes ==
The following rules were changed between the 2006 season and 2007.

- Race weekends were two days instead of three days.
- Races were two hours instead of three hours, but still required two mandatory pit stops
- Cars were allowed a maximum of three race engines for the entire season.
- Cars were required to use the same gear ratio with three different final drives throughout the entire season.
- All brakes were supplied by a single manufacturer and homologated by the FIA.
- All fuel was supplied by Shell through 2008.
- A new award was added for amateur drivers in older GT1-class cars. Sponsored by Cessna, the Citation Cup was to be awarded to eligible teams. Winners at each race were allowed on the GT1 podium, and the crews were awarded three hours of flight from Jetalliance.

== Entries ==
=== GT1 ===
A † symbol and gray background denotes an entry and driver competing in the Citation Cup.

Entrant	Car	Engine	Tyre	No.	Drivers	Rounds
(Germany) Vitaphone Racing Team	Maserati MC12 GT1	Maserati 6.0 L V12	M	1	(Italy) Thomas Biagi	All
(Germany) Vitaphone Racing Team	Maserati MC12 GT1	Maserati 6.0 L V12	M	1	(Germany) Michael Bartels	1, 4–10
(Germany) Vitaphone Racing Team	Maserati MC12 GT1	Maserati 6.0 L V12	M	1	(Finland) Mika Salo	2
(Germany) Vitaphone Racing Team	Maserati MC12 GT1	Maserati 6.0 L V12	M	1	(Italy) Fabrizio Gollin	3
(Germany) Vitaphone Racing Team	Maserati MC12 GT1	Maserati 6.0 L V12	M	1	(Belgium) Eric van de Poele	6
(Germany) Vitaphone Racing Team	Maserati MC12 GT1	Maserati 6.0 L V12	M	1	(Portugal) Pedro Lamy	6
(Germany) Vitaphone Racing Team	Maserati MC12 GT1	Maserati 6.0 L V12	M	2	(San Marino) Christian Montanari	All
(Germany) Vitaphone Racing Team	Maserati MC12 GT1	Maserati 6.0 L V12	M	2	(Portugal) Miguel Ramos	All
(Germany) Vitaphone Racing Team	Maserati MC12 GT1	Maserati 6.0 L V12	M	2	(Italy) Matteo Bobbi	6
(Germany) Vitaphone Racing Team	Maserati MC12 GT1	Maserati 6.0 L V12	M	2	(Belgium) Stéphane Lémeret	6
(France) Luc Alphand Aventures	Chevrolet Corvette C6.R	Chevrolet LS7.R 7.0 L V8	M	3	(Belgium) Vincent Vosse	6
(France) Luc Alphand Aventures	Chevrolet Corvette C6.R	Chevrolet LS7.R 7.0 L V8	M	3	(Belgium) Gregory Franchi	6
(France) Luc Alphand Aventures	Chevrolet Corvette C6.R	Chevrolet LS7.R 7.0 L V8	M	3	(United Kingdom) Oliver Gavin	6
(France) Luc Alphand Aventures	Chevrolet Corvette C6.R	Chevrolet LS7.R 7.0 L V8	M	3	(Monaco) Olivier Beretta	6
(Belgium) PK Carsport	Chevrolet Corvette C5-R	Chevrolet LS7.R 7.0 L V8	M	4	(Belgium) Anthony Kumpen	All
(Belgium) PK Carsport	Chevrolet Corvette C5-R	Chevrolet LS7.R 7.0 L V8	M	4	(Belgium) Bert Longin	All
(Belgium) PK Carsport	Chevrolet Corvette C5-R	Chevrolet LS7.R 7.0 L V8	M	4	(Belgium) Kurt Mollekens	6
(Belgium) PK Carsport	Chevrolet Corvette C5-R	Chevrolet LS7.R 7.0 L V8	M	4	(Belgium) Frédéric Bouvy	6
(Netherlands) Carsport Holland	Chevrolet Corvette C6.R	Chevrolet LS7.R 7.0 L V8	M	5	(Netherlands) Mike Hezemans	All
(Netherlands) Carsport Holland	Chevrolet Corvette C6.R	Chevrolet LS7.R 7.0 L V8	M	5	(Switzerland) Jean-Denis Délétraz	All
(Netherlands) Carsport Holland	Chevrolet Corvette C6.R	Chevrolet LS7.R 7.0 L V8	M	5	(Switzerland) Marcel Fässler	6
(Netherlands) Carsport Holland	Chevrolet Corvette C6.R	Chevrolet LS7.R 7.0 L V8	M	5	(Italy) Fabrizio Gollin	6
(France) Larbre Compétition	Ferrari 550-GTS Maranello	Ferrari F133 5.9 L V12	M	6†	(France) Jean-Yves Adam	9
(France) Larbre Compétition	Ferrari 550-GTS Maranello	Ferrari F133 5.9 L V12	M	6†	(France) Philippe Dumas	9
(Germany) All-Inkl.com Racing	Lamborghini Murcélago R-GT	Lamborghini 6.0 L V12	M	7	(Germany) Stefan Mücke	1–9
(Germany) All-Inkl.com Racing	Lamborghini Murcélago R-GT	Lamborghini 6.0 L V12	M	7	(France) Christophe Bouchut	1, 3–10
(Germany) All-Inkl.com Racing	Lamborghini Murcélago R-GT	Lamborghini 6.0 L V12	M	7	(Germany) Marc Basseng	2
(Germany) All-Inkl.com Racing	Lamborghini Murcélago R-GT	Lamborghini 6.0 L V12	M	7	(Germany) Frank Stippler	6
(Germany) All-Inkl.com Racing	Lamborghini Murcélago R-GT	Lamborghini 6.0 L V12	M	7	(Belgium) Marc Duez	10
(Germany) All-Inkl.com Racing	Lamborghini Murcélago R-GT	Lamborghini 6.0 L V12	M	8	(Netherlands) Jos Menten	1–5
(Germany) All-Inkl.com Racing	Lamborghini Murcélago R-GT	Lamborghini 6.0 L V12	M	8	(Netherlands) Peter Kox	1–5
(Germany) Phoenix Racing	Aston Martin DBR9	Aston Martin 6.0 L V12	M	9	(Italy) Fabrizio Gollin	10
(Germany) Phoenix Racing	Aston Martin DBR9	Aston Martin 6.0 L V12	M	9	(Switzerland) Marcel Fässler	10
(United Kingdom) Gigawave Motorsport	Aston Martin DBR9	Aston Martin 6.0 L V12	M	10	(United Kingdom) Luke Hines	10
(United Kingdom) Gigawave Motorsport	Aston Martin DBR9	Aston Martin 6.0 L V12	M	10	(Austria) Philipp Peter	10
(Italy) Scuderia Playteam Sarafree	Maserati MC12 GT1	Maserati 6.0 L V12	P	11	(Italy) Andrea Bertolini	All
(Italy) Scuderia Playteam Sarafree	Maserati MC12 GT1	Maserati 6.0 L V12	P	11	(Italy) Andrea Piccini	All
(Italy) Scuderia Playteam Sarafree	Maserati MC12 GT1	Maserati 6.0 L V12	P	11	(Italy) Alessandro Pier Guidi	6
(Italy) Scuderia Playteam Sarafree	Maserati MC12 GT1	Maserati 6.0 L V12	P	11	(Italy) Fabrizio de Simone	6
(Italy) Scuderia Playteam Sarafree	Maserati MC12 GT1	Maserati 6.0 L V12	P	12	(Italy) Giambattista Giannoccaro	All
(Italy) Scuderia Playteam Sarafree	Maserati MC12 GT1	Maserati 6.0 L V12	P	12	(Italy) Alessandro Pier Guidi	1–5, 7–10
(Italy) Scuderia Playteam Sarafree	Maserati MC12 GT1	Maserati 6.0 L V12	P	12	(Italy) Max Busnelli	6
(Italy) Scuderia Playteam Sarafree	Maserati MC12 GT1	Maserati 6.0 L V12	P	12	(Germany) Alex Müller	6
(Italy) Scuderia Playteam Sarafree	Maserati MC12 GT1	Maserati 6.0 L V12	P	12	(Belgium) Yves Lambert	6
(Austria) Rbimmo Racing Team	Saleen S7-R	Ford 6.9 L V8	P	13	(Czech Republic) Tomáš Enge	8
(Austria) Rbimmo Racing Team	Saleen S7-R	Ford 6.9 L V8	P	13	(Austria) Reinhard Kofler	8
(France) Solution F	Ferrari 550-GTS Maranello	Ferrari F133 5.9 L V12	M	14†	(France) François Jakubowski	2, 4, 9
(France) Solution F	Ferrari 550-GTS Maranello	Ferrari F133 5.9 L V12	M	14†	(Switzerland) François Labhardt	2, 4
(France) Solution F	Ferrari 550-GTS Maranello	Ferrari F133 5.9 L V12	M	14†	(Switzerland) Steve Zacchia	9
(Monaco) JMB Racing	Maserati MC12 GT1	Maserati 6.0 L V12	M	15†	(Netherlands) Peter Kutemann	2–5, 7–10
(Monaco) JMB Racing	Maserati MC12 GT1	Maserati 6.0 L V12	M	15†	(Netherlands) Dirk Waaijenberg	2–4, 10
(Monaco) JMB Racing	Maserati MC12 GT1	Maserati 6.0 L V12	M	15†	(France) Antoine Gosse	5, 8–9
(Monaco) JMB Racing	Maserati MC12 GT1	Maserati 6.0 L V12	M	15†	(Switzerland) Henri Moser	7
(Monaco) JMB Racing	Maserati MC12 GT1	Maserati 6.0 L V12	M	16†	(United Kingdom) Ben Aucott	All
(Monaco) JMB Racing	Maserati MC12 GT1	Maserati 6.0 L V12	M	16†	(United Kingdom) Joe Macari	1–6
(Monaco) JMB Racing	Maserati MC12 GT1	Maserati 6.0 L V12	M	16†	(United Kingdom) Marino Franchitti	6
(Monaco) JMB Racing	Maserati MC12 GT1	Maserati 6.0 L V12	M	16†	(Austria) Philipp Peter	6
(Monaco) JMB Racing	Maserati MC12 GT1	Maserati 6.0 L V12	M	16†	(France) Alain Ferté	7–8
(Monaco) JMB Racing	Maserati MC12 GT1	Maserati 6.0 L V12	M	16†	(France) Stéphane Daoudi	9–10
(United Kingdom) Barwell Motorsport	Aston Martin DBR9	Aston Martin 6.0 L V12	M	17	(United Kingdom) Jonny Cocker	1–2
(United Kingdom) Barwell Motorsport	Aston Martin DBR9	Aston Martin 6.0 L V12	M	17	(United Kingdom) Jonny Kane	1
(United Kingdom) Barwell Motorsport	Aston Martin DBR9	Aston Martin 6.0 L V12	M	17	(United Kingdom) Piers Johnson	2
(Belgium) SRT	Chevrolet Corvette C5-R	Chevrolet LS7.R 7.0 L V8	M	18†	(Belgium) Tom Cloet	2–4, 7–8, 10
(Belgium) SRT	Chevrolet Corvette C5-R	Chevrolet LS7.R 7.0 L V8	M	18†	(Finland) Pertti Kuismanen	2
(Belgium) SRT	Chevrolet Corvette C5-R	Chevrolet LS7.R 7.0 L V8	M	18†	(France) Gilles Vannelet	3
(Belgium) SRT	Chevrolet Corvette C5-R	Chevrolet LS7.R 7.0 L V8	M	18†	(Italy) Mauro Casadei	4, 8
(Belgium) SRT	Chevrolet Corvette C5-R	Chevrolet LS7.R 7.0 L V8	M	18†	(Belgium) Maxime Soulet	6, 10
(Belgium) SRT	Chevrolet Corvette C5-R	Chevrolet LS7.R 7.0 L V8	M	18†	(Belgium) Marc Duez	6
(Belgium) SRT	Chevrolet Corvette C5-R	Chevrolet LS7.R 7.0 L V8	M	18†	(Belgium) Damien Coens	6
(Belgium) SRT	Chevrolet Corvette C5-R	Chevrolet LS7.R 7.0 L V8	M	18†	(Belgium) Steve Van Bellingen	6
(Belgium) SRT	Chevrolet Corvette C5-R	Chevrolet LS7.R 7.0 L V8	M	18†	(Italy) David Amaduzzi	7
(Belgium) SRT	Chevrolet Corvette C5-R	Chevrolet LS7.R 7.0 L V8	M	18†	(France) Yvan Lebon	9
(Belgium) SRT	Chevrolet Corvette C5-R	Chevrolet LS7.R 7.0 L V8	M	18†	(France) Wilfried Merafina	9
(Belgium) PSI Experience	Chevrolet Corvette C6.R	Chevrolet LS7.R 7.0 L V8	M P	19	(United Kingdom) Luke Hines	1–2, 4
(Belgium) PSI Experience	Chevrolet Corvette C6.R	Chevrolet LS7.R 7.0 L V8	M P	19	(Austria) Philipp Peter	1–2, 4
(Belgium) PSI Experience	Chevrolet Corvette C6.R	Chevrolet LS7.R 7.0 L V8	M P	19	(Belgium) Loïc Deman	10
(Belgium) PSI Experience	Chevrolet Corvette C6.R	Chevrolet LS7.R 7.0 L V8	M P	19	(Belgium) Stefan Van Campenhoudt	10
(Belgium) PSI Experience	Chevrolet Corvette C5-R	Chevrolet LS7.R 7.0 L V8	M P	20†	(France) Gilles Vannelet	4
(Belgium) PSI Experience	Chevrolet Corvette C5-R	Chevrolet LS7.R 7.0 L V8	M P	20†	(Austria) Klaus Engelhorn	4
(Switzerland) Kessel	Ferrari 575 GTC	Ferrari F133 GT 6.0 L V12	M	21†	(Switzerland) Loris Kessel	2–4, 7
(Switzerland) Kessel	Ferrari 575 GTC	Ferrari F133 GT 6.0 L V12	M	21†	(Switzerland) Massimo Cattori	2
(Switzerland) Kessel	Ferrari 575 GTC	Ferrari F133 GT 6.0 L V12	M	21†	(Italy) Lorenzo Casè	3–4
(Switzerland) Kessel	Ferrari 575 GTC	Ferrari F133 GT 6.0 L V12	M	21†	(Italy) Andrea Palmer	7
(Italy) Aston Martin Racing BMS	Aston Martin DBR9	Aston Martin 6.0 L V12	P	22	(Italy) Ferdinando Monfardini	1–5, 7–10
(Italy) Aston Martin Racing BMS	Aston Martin DBR9	Aston Martin 6.0 L V12	P	22	(Switzerland) Giorgio Mondini	1
(Italy) Aston Martin Racing BMS	Aston Martin DBR9	Aston Martin 6.0 L V12	P	22	(Italy) Enrico Toccacelo	2–4, 6–8
(Italy) Aston Martin Racing BMS	Aston Martin DBR9	Aston Martin 6.0 L V12	P	22	(Italy) Diego Alessi	5
(Italy) Aston Martin Racing BMS	Aston Martin DBR9	Aston Martin 6.0 L V12	P	22	(Italy) Alex Frassinetti	6
(Italy) Aston Martin Racing BMS	Aston Martin DBR9	Aston Martin 6.0 L V12	P	22	(Italy) Gabriele Lancieri	6
(Italy) Aston Martin Racing BMS	Aston Martin DBR9	Aston Martin 6.0 L V12	P	22	(Italy) Riccardo Regazzi	6
(Italy) Aston Martin Racing BMS	Aston Martin DBR9	Aston Martin 6.0 L V12	P	22	(France) Jean-Marc Gounon	9–10
(Italy) Aston Martin Racing BMS	Aston Martin DBR9	Aston Martin 6.0 L V12	P	23	(Italy) Fabio Babini	All
(Italy) Aston Martin Racing BMS	Aston Martin DBR9	Aston Martin 6.0 L V12	P	23	(United Kingdom) Jamie Davies	All
(Italy) Aston Martin Racing BMS	Aston Martin DBR9	Aston Martin 6.0 L V12	P	23	(Italy) Ferdinando Monfardini	6
(Italy) Aston Martin Racing BMS	Aston Martin DBR9	Aston Martin 6.0 L V12	P	23	(Italy) Diego Alessi	6
(Germany) Reiter Lamborghini	Lamborghini Murciélago R-GT	Lamborghini 6.0 L V12	M	28	(Netherlands) Jos Menten	6–8, 10
(Germany) Reiter Lamborghini	Lamborghini Murciélago R-GT	Lamborghini 6.0 L V12	M	28	(Netherlands) Peter Kox	6–8, 10
(Germany) Reiter Lamborghini	Lamborghini Murciélago R-GT	Lamborghini 6.0 L V12	M	28	(Netherlands) Jeroen Bleekemolen	6
(Austria) Jetalliance Racing	Aston Martin DBR9	Aston Martin 6.0 L V12	M	33	(Austria) Karl Wendlinger	All
(Austria) Jetalliance Racing	Aston Martin DBR9	Aston Martin 6.0 L V12	M	33	(United Kingdom) Ryan Sharp	All
(Austria) Jetalliance Racing	Aston Martin DBR9	Aston Martin 6.0 L V12	M	33	(Austria) Lukas Lichtner-Hoyer	6
(Austria) Jetalliance Racing	Aston Martin DBR9	Aston Martin 6.0 L V12	M	33	(Austria) Robert Lechner	6
(Austria) Jetalliance Racing	Aston Martin DBR9	Aston Martin 6.0 L V12	M	36	(Austria) Lukas Lichtner-Hoyer	1–5, 7–10
(Austria) Jetalliance Racing	Aston Martin DBR9	Aston Martin 6.0 L V12	M	36	(Austria) Robert Lechner	1–5, 7–10
(France) Red Racing (Note: Red Racing's entry was classified as Group 2 (G2) instead of GT1, making it ineligible for the FIA GT1 driver or team championships, however the entry was deemed eligible for the Citation Cup for drivers of GT1 cars.)	Chrysler Viper GTS-R	Chrysler 356-T6 8.0 L V10	M	102†	(Luxembourg) Sébastien Carcone	2, 4, 9
(France) Red Racing	Chrysler Viper GTS-R	Chrysler 356-T6 8.0 L V10	M	102†	(France) Thierry Stépec	2, 4
(France) Red Racing	Chrysler Viper GTS-R	Chrysler 356-T6 8.0 L V10	M	102†	(France) Thierry Prignaud	9
(France) Red Racing	Chrysler Viper GTS-R	Chrysler 356-T6 8.0 L V10	M	102†	(France) Nicolas Maillet	9

=== GT2 ===
Entrant	Car	Engine	Tyre	No.	Drivers	Rounds
(Italy) AF Corse Motorola	Ferrari F430 GTC	Ferrari 4.3 L V8	M	50	(Finland) Toni Vilander	All
(Italy) AF Corse Motorola	Ferrari F430 GTC	Ferrari 4.3 L V8	M	50	(Germany) Dirk Müller	All
(Italy) AF Corse Motorola	Ferrari F430 GTC	Ferrari 4.3 L V8	M	50	(Finland) Mika Salo	6
(Italy) AF Corse Motorola	Ferrari F430 GTC	Ferrari 4.3 L V8	M	51	(Italy) Gianmaria Bruni	All
(Italy) AF Corse Motorola	Ferrari F430 GTC	Ferrari 4.3 L V8	M	51	(Monaco) Stéphane Ortelli	1, 3–10
(Italy) AF Corse Motorola	Ferrari F430 GTC	Ferrari 4.3 L V8	M	51	(Brazil) Jaime Melo	2
(Italy) AF Corse Motorola	Ferrari F430 GTC	Ferrari 4.3 L V8	M	51	(Portugal) Rui Águas	6
(Italy) Advanced Engineering	Ferrari F430 GTC	Ferrari 4.3 L V8	M	59	(Portugal) Rui Águas	8–10
(Italy) Advanced Engineering	Ferrari F430 GTC	Ferrari 4.3 L V8	M	59	(Italy) Stefano Gattuso	8
(Italy) Advanced Engineering	Ferrari F430 GTC	Ferrari 4.3 L V8	M	59	(Austria) Philipp Peter	9
(Italy) Advanced Engineering	Ferrari F430 GTC	Ferrari 4.3 L V8	M	59	(Italy) Maurizio Mediani	10
(Italy) Racing Team Edil Cris	Ferrari F430 GTC	Ferrari 4.3 L V8	P	52	(Italy) Paolo Ruberti	2–9
(Italy) Racing Team Edil Cris	Ferrari F430 GTC	Ferrari 4.3 L V8	P	52	(France) Damien Pasini	2, 4–8
(Italy) Racing Team Edil Cris	Ferrari F430 GTC	Ferrari 4.3 L V8	P	52	(Italy) Massimiliano Mugelli	3
(Italy) Racing Team Edil Cris	Ferrari F430 GTC	Ferrari 4.3 L V8	P	52	(Italy) Lorenzo Casè	6
(Italy) Racing Team Edil Cris	Ferrari F430 GTC	Ferrari 4.3 L V8	P	52	(Italy) Matteo Cressoni	6
(Italy) Racing Team Edil Cris	Ferrari F430 GTC	Ferrari 4.3 L V8	P	52	(Italy) Maurizio Mediani	9
(Italy) Racing Team Edil Cris	Ferrari F430 GTC	Ferrari 4.3 L V8	P	53	(Italy) Matteo Cressoni	2–5, 7–9
(Italy) Racing Team Edil Cris	Ferrari F430 GTC	Ferrari 4.3 L V8	P	53	(Italy) Michele Rugolo	2–5, 9
(Italy) Racing Team Edil Cris	Ferrari F430 GTC	Ferrari 4.3 L V8	P	53	(Italy) Maurizio Mediani	7
(Italy) Racing Team Edil Cris	Ferrari F430 GTC	Ferrari 4.3 L V8	P	53	(Italy) Luciano Linossi	8
(Belgium) Prospeed Competition	Porsche 911 GT3 RSR	Porsche 3.8 L Flat-6	M	60	(Belgium) Rudi Penders	4, 6
(Belgium) Prospeed Competition	Porsche 911 GT3 RSR	Porsche 3.8 L Flat-6	M	60	(Belgium) Franz Lamot	4, 6
(Belgium) Prospeed Competition	Porsche 911 GT3 RSR	Porsche 3.8 L Flat-6	M	60	(Belgium) Bart Couwberghs	6
(Belgium) Prospeed Competition	Porsche 911 GT3 RSR	Porsche 3.8 L Flat-6	M	60	(Belgium) François Duval	6
(Belgium) Prospeed Competition	Porsche 911 GT3 RSR	Porsche 3.8 L Flat-6	M	60	(Germany) Marc Lieb	10
(Belgium) Prospeed Competition	Porsche 911 GT3 RSR	Porsche 3.8 L Flat-6	M	60	(Germany) Marc Basseng	10
(United Kingdom) Scuderia Ecosse	Ferrari F430 GTC	Ferrari 4.3 L V8	P	62	(United Kingdom) Tim Mullen	All
(United Kingdom) Scuderia Ecosse	Ferrari F430 GTC	Ferrari 4.3 L V8	P	62	(Czech Republic) Tomáš Enge	1, 4, 6
(United Kingdom) Scuderia Ecosse	Ferrari F430 GTC	Ferrari 4.3 L V8	P	62	(United Kingdom) Andrew Kirkaldy	2–3
(United Kingdom) Scuderia Ecosse	Ferrari F430 GTC	Ferrari 4.3 L V8	P	62	(Czech Republic) Jaroslav Janiš	5–6
(United Kingdom) Scuderia Ecosse	Ferrari F430 GTC	Ferrari 4.3 L V8	P	62	(United Kingdom) Jonny Kane	6
(United Kingdom) Scuderia Ecosse	Ferrari F430 GTC	Ferrari 4.3 L V8	P	62	(United Kingdom) Darren Turner	7–10
(United Kingdom) Scuderia Ecosse	Ferrari F430 GTC	Ferrari 4.3 L V8	P	63	(Canada) Chris Niarchos	1–6, 8
(United Kingdom) Scuderia Ecosse	Ferrari F430 GTC	Ferrari 4.3 L V8	P	63	(United Kingdom) Andrew Kirkaldy	1, 4–6, 8–10
(United Kingdom) Scuderia Ecosse	Ferrari F430 GTC	Ferrari 4.3 L V8	P	63	(United Kingdom) Nigel Mansell	2
(United Kingdom) Scuderia Ecosse	Ferrari F430 GTC	Ferrari 4.3 L V8	P	63	(Czech Republic) Jaroslav Janiš	3
(United Kingdom) Scuderia Ecosse	Ferrari F430 GTC	Ferrari 4.3 L V8	P	63	(United Kingdom) Tim Sugden	6–7, 10
(United Kingdom) Scuderia Ecosse	Ferrari F430 GTC	Ferrari 4.3 L V8	P	63	(United Kingdom) Rob Bell	7, 9
(Germany) Team Felbermayr-Proton	Porsche 911 GT3 RSR	Porsche 3.8 L Flat-6	P	66	(Germany) Marc Lieb	3
(Germany) Team Felbermayr-Proton	Porsche 911 GT3 RSR	Porsche 3.8 L Flat-6	P	66	(Austria) Horst Felbermayr Jr.	3
(Germany) Team Felbermayr-Proton	Porsche 911 GT3 RSR	Porsche 3.8 L Flat-6	P	69	(Germany) Gerold Ried	1
(Germany) Team Felbermayr-Proton	Porsche 911 GT3 RSR	Porsche 3.8 L Flat-6	P	69	(Germany) Marc Basseng	1
(Germany) Team Felbermayr-Proton	Porsche 911 GT3 RSR	Porsche 3.8 L Flat-6	P	69	(Austria) Horst Felbermayr	3
(Germany) Team Felbermayr-Proton	Porsche 911 GT3 RSR	Porsche 3.8 L Flat-6	P	69	(Germany) Christian Ried	3
(Italy) Easy Race	Ferrari F430 GTC	Ferrari 4.3 L V8	P	70	(Italy) Giampaolo Tenchini	6
(Italy) Easy Race	Ferrari F430 GTC	Ferrari 4.3 L V8	P	70	(Italy) Maurice Basso	6
(Italy) Easy Race	Ferrari F430 GTC	Ferrari 4.3 L V8	P	70	(Italy) Roberto Plati	6
(Italy) Easy Race	Ferrari F430 GTC	Ferrari 4.3 L V8	P	70	(United Kingdom) Bo McCormick	6
(Italy) Ebimotors	Porsche 911 GT3 RSR	Porsche 3.8 L Flat-6	M	74	(Italy) Marcello Zani	All
(Italy) Ebimotors	Porsche 911 GT3 RSR	Porsche 3.8 L Flat-6	M	74	(Italy) Emanuele Busnelli	1–6
(Italy) Ebimotors	Porsche 911 GT3 RSR	Porsche 3.8 L Flat-6	M	74	(France) Xavier Pompidou	6–10
(Italy) Ebimotors	Porsche 911 GT3 RSR	Porsche 3.8 L Flat-6	M	74	(Italy) Andrea Ceccato	6
(France) IMSA Performance Matmut	Porsche 911 GT3 RSR	Porsche 3.8 L Flat-6	M	76	(France) Raymond Narac	6
(France) IMSA Performance Matmut	Porsche 911 GT3 RSR	Porsche 3.8 L Flat-6	M	76	(United States) Patrick Long	6
(France) IMSA Performance Matmut	Porsche 911 GT3 RSR	Porsche 3.8 L Flat-6	M	76	(Austria) Richard Lietz	6
(Monaco) JMB Racing	Ferrari F430 GTC	Ferrari 4.3 L V8	M	78	(Belgium) Charles de Pauw	6
(Monaco) JMB Racing	Ferrari F430 GTC	Ferrari 4.3 L V8	M	78	(Belgium) Alain Van den Hove	6
(Monaco) JMB Racing	Ferrari F430 GTC	Ferrari 4.3 L V8	M	78	(Belgium) Didier de Radiguès	6
(Monaco) JMB Racing	Ferrari F430 GTC	Ferrari 4.3 L V8	M	78	(France) Paul Belmondo	6
(United Kingdom) JWA	Porsche 911 GT3 RSR	Porsche 3.8 L Flat-6	P	95	(United Kingdom) Paul Daniels	6
(United Kingdom) JWA	Porsche 911 GT3 RSR	Porsche 3.8 L Flat-6	P	95	(United Kingdom) David Cox	6
(United Kingdom) JWA	Porsche 911 GT3 RSR	Porsche 3.8 L Flat-6	P	95	(United Kingdom) Oliver Moorey	6
(United Kingdom) JWA	Porsche 911 GT3 RSR	Porsche 3.8 L Flat-6	P	95	(Switzerland) Joël Camathias	6
(Italy) BMS Scuderia Italia	Porsche 911 GT3 RSR	Porsche 3.8 L Flat-6	P	97	(France) Emmanuel Collard	All
(Italy) BMS Scuderia Italia	Porsche 911 GT3 RSR	Porsche 3.8 L Flat-6	P	97	(Italy) Matteo Malucelli	All
(Italy) BMS Scuderia Italia	Porsche 911 GT3 RSR	Porsche 3.8 L Flat-6	P	97	(Germany) Marc Lieb	6
(United Kingdom) Tech9 Motorsport	Porsche 911 GT3 RSR	Porsche 3.8 L Flat-6	M	99	(United Kingdom) Sean Edwards	1–8
(United Kingdom) Tech9 Motorsport	Porsche 911 GT3 RSR	Porsche 3.8 L Flat-6	M	99	(Russia) Leo Machitski	1–8
(United Kingdom) Tech9 Motorsport	Porsche 911 GT3 RSR	Porsche 3.8 L Flat-6	M	99	(Germany) Sascha Maassen	6

== Season results ==
Overall winners in bold.

Rnd	Circuit	GT1 Winning Team	GT2 Winning Team	Results
Rnd	Circuit	GT1 Winning Drivers	GT2 Winning Drivers	Results
1	Zhuhai	(Germany) **#7 All-Inkl.com Racing**	(Italy) #50 Motorola AF Corse	Results
1	Zhuhai	(France) **Christophe Bouchut** (Germany) **Stefan Mücke**	(Germany) Dirk Müller (Finland) Toni Vilander	Results
2	Silverstone	(Germany) **#1 Vitaphone Racing Team**	(Italy) #50 Motorola AF Corse	Results
2	Silverstone	(Finland) **Mika Salo** (Italy) **Thomas Biagi**	(Germany) Dirk Müller (Finland) Toni Vilander	Results
3	Bucharest	(Italy) **#11 Scuderia Playteam Sarafree**	(Italy) #50 Motorola AF Corse	Results
3	Bucharest	(Italy) **Andrea Bertolini** (Italy) **Andrea Piccini**	(Germany) Dirk Müller (Finland) Toni Vilander	Results
4	Monza	(Austria) **#33 Jetalliance Racing**	(Italy) #51 Motorola AF Corse	Results
4	Monza	(Austria) **Karl Wendlinger** (United Kingdom) **Ryan Sharp**	(Italy) Gianmaria Bruni (Monaco) Stéphane Ortelli	Results
5	Oschersleben	(Germany) **#1 Vitaphone Racing Team**	(Italy) #51 Motorola AF Corse	Results
5	Oschersleben	(Germany) **Michael Bartels** (Italy) **Thomas Biagi**	(Italy) Gianmaria Bruni (Monaco) Stéphane Ortelli	Results
6	Spa-Francorchamps	(Netherlands) **#5 Carsport Holland**	(Italy) #97 BMS Scuderia Italia	Results
6	Spa-Francorchamps	(Netherlands) **Mike Hezemans** (Switzerland) **Jean-Denis Délétraz** (Switzerland) **Marcel Fässler** (Italy) **Fabrizio Gollin**	(France) Emmanuel Collard (Italy) Matteo Malucelli (Germany) Marc Lieb	Results
7	Adria	(Austria) **#33 Jetalliance Racing**	(Italy) #50 Motorola AF Corse	Results
7	Adria	(Austria) **Karl Wendlinger** (United Kingdom) **Ryan Sharp**	(Germany) Dirk Müller (Finland) Toni Vilander	Results
8	Brno	(Germany) **#2 Vitaphone Racing Team**	(Italy) #50 Motorola AF Corse	Results
8	Brno	(San Marino) **Christian Montanari** (Portugal) **Miguel Ramos**	(Germany) Dirk Müller (Finland) Toni Vilander	Results
9	Nogaro	(Netherlands) **#5 Carsport Holland**	(Italy) #51 Motorola AF Corse	Results
9	Nogaro	(Netherlands) **Mike Hezemans** (Switzerland) **Jean-Denis Délétraz**	(Monaco) Stéphane Ortelli (Italy) Gianmaria Bruni	Results
10	Zolder	(Austria) **#33 Jetalliance Racing**	(Italy) #50 Motorola AF Corse	Results
10	Zolder	(Austria) **Karl Wendlinger** (United Kingdom) **Ryan Sharp**	(Germany) Dirk Müller (Finland) Toni Vilander	Results

== Drivers' Championship ==
Points are awarded to the top 8 finishers in the order of 10–8–6–5–4–3–2–1 except at the Spa 24 Hours. Drivers who do not drive the car for a minimum distance do not score points.

=== GT1 Championship for Drivers - standings ===
Pos.	Driver	Team	ZHU (China)	SIL (United Kingdom)	BUC (Romania)	MON (Italy)	OSC (Germany)	SPA (Belgium)			ADR (Italy)	BRN (Czech Republic)	NOG (France)	ZOL (Belgium)	Total points
Pos.	Driver	Team	ZHU (China)	SIL (United Kingdom)	BUC (Romania)	MON (Italy)	OSC (Germany)	6H	12H	24H	ADR (Italy)	BRN (Czech Republic)	NOG (France)	ZOL (Belgium)	Total points
1	(Italy) Thomas Biagi	(Germany) Vitaphone Racing Team	6	1	6	4	1	5	2	2	13	7	2	3	61
2	(Austria) Karl Wendlinger	(Austria) Jetalliance Racing	9	4	4	1	Ret	1	Ret	Ret	1	2	5	1	57
2	(United Kingdom) Ryan Sharp	(Austria) Jetalliance Racing	9	4	4	1	Ret	1	Ret	Ret	1	2	5	1	57
3	(Switzerland) Jean-Denis Délétraz	(Netherlands) Carsport Holland	5	2	Ret	3	Ret	3	1	1	5	9	1	4	55
3	(Netherlands) Mike Hezemans	(Netherlands) Carsport Holland	5	2	Ret	3	Ret	3	1	1	5	9	1	4	55
4	(Portugal) Miguel Ramos	(Germany) Vitaphone Racing Team	7	6	3	2	8	6	4	4	4	1	3	5	54
4	(San Marino) Christian Montanari	(Germany) Vitaphone Racing Team	7	6	3	2	8	6	4	4	4	1	3	5	54
5	(Italy) Andrea Bertolini	(Italy) Scuderia Playteam Sarafree	Ret	5	1	8	2	2	3	5	2	4	6	8	51
5	(Italy) Andrea Piccini	(Italy) Scuderia Playteam Sarafree	Ret	5	1	8	2	2	3	5	2	4	6	8	51
6	(Germany) Michael Bartels	(Germany) Vitaphone Racing Team	6			4	1	5	2	2	13	7	2	3	45
7	(Belgium) Anthony Kumpen	(Belgium) PK Carsport	3	3	5	5	DSQ	8	5	3	10	3	8	2	43.5
7	(Belgium) Bert Longin	(Belgium) PK Carsport	3	3	5	5	DSQ	8	5	3	10	3	8	2	43.5
8	(Italy) Fabio Babini	(Italy) Aston Martin Racing BMS	4	7	7	6	3	7	10	Ret	3	11	4	Ret	30
8	(United Kingdom) Jamie Davies	(Italy) Aston Martin Racing BMS	4	7	7	6	3	7	10	Ret	3	11	4	Ret	30
9	(Italy) Alessandro Pier Guidi	(Italy) Scuderia Playteam Sarafree	Ret	8	Ret	9	4	2	3	5	Ret	5	7	Ret	23
10	(Germany) Stefan Mücke	(Germany) All-Inkl.com Racing	1	9	2	10	DSQ	Ret	Ret	Ret	9	6	12		21
10	(France) Christophe Bouchut	(Germany) All-Inkl.com Racing	1		2	10	DSQ	Ret	Ret	Ret	9	6	12	12	21
11	(Italy) Fabrizio Gollin	(Germany) Vitaphone Racing Team			6										21
11	(Italy) Fabrizio Gollin	(Netherlands) Carsport Holland						3	1	1					21
11	(Italy) Fabrizio Gollin	(Germany) Phoenix Racing												Ret	21
12	(Switzerland) Marcel Fässler	(Netherlands) Carsport Holland						3	1	1					18
12	(Switzerland) Marcel Fässler	(Germany) Phoenix Racing												Ret	18
13	(Portugal) Pedro Lamy	(Germany) Vitaphone Racing Team						5	2	2					14
13	(Belgium) Eric van de Poele	(Germany) Vitaphone Racing Team						5	2	2					14
14	(Italy) Giambattista Giannoccaro	(Italy) Scuderia Playteam Sarafree	Ret	8	Ret	9	4	11	9	9	Ret	5	7	Ret	12
15	(Netherlands) Jos Menten	(Germany) All-Inkl.com Racing	11	Ret	Ret	10	5								11
15	(Netherlands) Jos Menten	(Germany) Reiter Lamborghini						12	11	Ret	6	8		6	11
15	(Netherlands) Peter Kox	(Germany) All-Inkl.com Racing	11	Ret	Ret	10	5								11
15	(Netherlands) Peter Kox	(Germany) Reiter Lamborghini						12	11	Ret	6	8		6	11
16	(Italy) Fabrizio De Simone	(Italy) Scuderia Playteam Sarafree						2	3	5					11
17	(Austria) Philipp Peter	(Belgium) PSI Experience	2	13		11									10.5
17	(Austria) Philipp Peter	(Monaco) JMB Racing						10	8	7					10.5
17	(Austria) Philipp Peter	(United Kingdom) Gigawave Motorsport												Ret	10.5
18	(Finland) Mika Salo	(Germany) Vitaphone Racing Team		1											10
19	(Italy) Matteo Bobbi	(Germany) Vitaphone Racing Team						6	4	4					9
19	(Belgium) Stéphane Lémeret	(Germany) Vitaphone Racing Team						6	4	4					9
20	(Belgium) Frédéric Bouvy	(Belgium) PK Carsport						8	5	3					8.5
20	(Belgium) Kurt Mollekens	(Belgium) PK Carsport						8	5	3					8.5
21	(United Kingdom) Luke Hines	(Belgium) PSI Experience	2	13		11									8
21	(United Kingdom) Luke Hines	(United Kingdom) Gigawave Motorsport												Ret	8
22	(Italy) Ferdinando Monfardini	(Italy) Aston Martin Racing BMS	10	12	Ret	12	6	7	10	Ret	7	13	10	7	8
23	(Austria) Lukas Lichtner-Hoyer	(Austria) Jetalliance Racing	12	11	Ret	7	Ret	1	Ret	Ret	8	10	9	9	8
23	(Austria) Robert Lechner	(Austria) Jetalliance Racing	12	11	Ret	7	Ret	1	Ret	Ret	8	10	9	9	8
24	(United Kingdom) Oliver Gavin	(France) Luc Alphand Aventures						4	6	6					7
24	(Belgium) Vincent Vosse	(France) Luc Alphand Aventures						4	6	6					7
24	(Belgium) Gregory Franchi	(France) Luc Alphand Aventures						4	6	6					7
24	(Monaco) Olivier Beretta	(France) Luc Alphand Aventures						4	6	6					7
25	(United Kingdom) Ben Aucott	(Monaco) JMB Racing	13	15	9	14	7	10	8	7	11	12	11	10	4.5
25	(United Kingdom) Joe Macari	(Monaco) JMB Racing	13	15	9	14	7	10	8	7					4.5
26	(Italy) Diego Alessi	(Italy) Aston Martin Racing BMS					6	7	10	Ret					4
27	(United Kingdom) Marino Franchitti	(Monaco) JMB Racing						10	8	7					2.5
28	(France) Jean-Marc Gounon	(Italy) Aston Martin Racing BMS											10	7	2
29	(Italy) Enrico Toccacelo	(Italy) Aston Martin Racing BMS		12	Ret	12		Ret	Ret	Ret	7	13			2
30	(Belgium) Maxime Soulet	(Belgium) SRT						10	7	8				11	2
30	(Belgium) Steve Van Bellingen	(Belgium) SRT						10	7	8					2
30	(Belgium) Damien Coens	(Belgium) SRT						10	7	8					2
30	(Belgium) Marc Duez	(Belgium) SRT						10	7	8					2
31	(United Kingdom) Jonny Kane	(United Kingdom) Barwell Motorsports	8	10											1
32	(Belgium) Tom Cloet	(Belgium) SRT		14	8	13					12	15		11	1
33	(France) Gilles Vannelet	(Belgium) SRT			8										1
33	(France) Gilles Vannelet	(Belgium) PSI Experience				15									1
34	(United Kingdom) Jonathan Cocker	(United Kingdom) Barwell Motorsports	8												1
Pos.	Driver	Team	ZHU (China)	SIL (United Kingdom)	BUC (Romania)	MON (Italy)	OSC (Germany)	6H	12H	24H	ADR (Italy)	BRN (Czech Republic)	NOG (France)	ZOL (Belgium)	Total points
Pos.	Driver	Team	ZHU (China)	SIL (United Kingdom)	BUC (Romania)	MON (Italy)	OSC (Germany)	SPA (Belgium)			ADR (Italy)	BRN (Czech Republic)	NOG (France)	ZOL (Belgium)	Total points

Colour	Result
Gold	Winner
Silver	Second place
Bronze	Third place
Green	Points classification
Blue	Non-points classification
Blue	Non-classified finish (NC)
Purple	Retired, not classified (Ret)
Red	Did not qualify (DNQ)
Red	Did not pre-qualify (DNPQ)
Black	Disqualified (DSQ)
White	Did not start (DNS)
White	Withdrew (WD)
White	Race cancelled (C)
Blank	Did not practice (DNP)
Blank	Did not arrive (DNA)
Blank	Excluded (EX)

=== GT2 Cup for Drivers - standings ===
Pos.	Driver	Team	ZHU (China)	SIL (United Kingdom)	BUC (Romania)	MON (Italy)	OSC (Germany)	SPA (Belgium)			ADR (Italy)	BRN (Czech Republic)	NOG (France)	ZOL (Belgium)	Total points
Pos.	Driver	Team	ZHU (China)	SIL (United Kingdom)	BUC (Romania)	MON (Italy)	OSC (Germany)	6H	12H	24H	ADR (Italy)	BRN (Czech Republic)	NOG (France)	ZOL (Belgium)	Total points
1	(Finland) Toni Vilander	(Italy) AF Corse Motorola	1	1	1	2	4	Ret	Ret	Ret	1	1	Ret	1	73
1	(Germany) Dirk Müller	(Italy) AF Corse Motorola	1	1	1	2	4	Ret	Ret	Ret	1	1	Ret	1	73
2	(Italy) Gianmaria Bruni	(Italy) AF Corse Motorola	2	Ret	DNS	1	1	2	2	10	2	2	1	5	66
2	(Monaco) Stéphane Ortelli	(Italy) AF Corse Motorola	2	Ret	DNS	1	1	2	2	10	2	2	1	5	66
3	(France) Emmanuel Collard	(Italy) BMS Scuderia Italia	DSQ	4	2	Ret	2	1	1	1	3	5	2	4	64
3	(Italy) Matteo Malucelli	(Italy) BMS Scuderia Italia	DSQ	4	2	Ret	2	1	1	1	3	5	2	4	64
4	(Italy) Marcello Zani	(Italy) Ebimotors	4	Ret	4	4	8	5	6	4	4	6	6	2	43.5
5	(United Kingdom) Tim Mullen	(United Kingdom) Scuderia Ecosse	3	5	5	7	3	7	Ret	Ret	DSQ	3	4	7	36
6	(Italy) Paolo Ruberti	(Italy) Racing Team Edil Cris		2	Ret	3	5	3	4	5	7	DSQ	5		33.5
7	(France) Damien Pasini	(Italy) Racing Team Edil Cris		2		3	5	3	4	5	7	DSQ			29.5
8	(United Kingdom) Andrew Kirkaldy	(United Kingdom) Scuderia Ecosse	5	5	5	9	6	8	7	6		8	3	6	29.5
9	(Italy) Matteo Cressoni	(Italy) Racing Team Edil Cris		3	6	5	9	3	4	5	6	7	8		28.5
10	(France) Xavier Pompidou	(Italy) Ebimotors						5	6	4	4	6	6	2	27.5
11	(Germany) Marc Lieb	(Germany) Team Felbermayr-Proton			3										27
11	(Germany) Marc Lieb	(Italy) BMS Scuderia Italia						1	1	1					27
11	(Germany) Marc Lieb	(Belgium) Prospeed Competition												8	27
12	(Italy) Emanuele Busnelli	(Italy) Ebimotors	4	Ret	4	4	8	5	6	4					24.5
13	(Russia) Leo Machitski	(United Kingdom) Tech9 Motorsports	6	6	Ret	6	7	6	5	3	5	9			24.5
13	(United Kingdom) Sean Edwards	(United Kingdom) Tech9 Motorsports	6	6	Ret	6	7	6	5	3	5	9			24.5
14	(Portugal) Rui Águas	(Italy) AF Corse Motorola						2	2	10					15
14	(Portugal) Rui Águas	(Italy) Advanced Engineering										4	7	3	15
15	(Canada) Chris Niarchos	(United Kingdom) Scuderia Ecosse	5	7	Ret	9	6	8	7	6		8			14.5
16	(Italy) Michele Rugolo	(Italy) Racing Team Edil Cris		3	6	5	9						8		14
17	(France) Raymond Narac	(France) IMSA Performance Matmut						4	3	2					13.5
17	(Austria) Richard Lietz	(France) IMSA Performance Matmut						4	3	2					13.5
17	(United States) Patrick Long	(France) IMSA Performance Matmut						4	3	2					13.5
18	(United Kingdom) Darren Turner	(United Kingdom) Scuderia Ecosse									DSQ	3	4	7	13
19	(Italy) Maurizio Mediani	(Italy) Racing Team Edil Cris									6		5		13
19	(Italy) Maurizio Mediani	(Italy) Advanced Engineering												3	13
20	(Germany) Sascha Maassen	(United Kingdom) Tech9 Motorsports						6	5	3					9.5
21	(Italy) Lorenzo Casè	(Italy) Racing Team Edil Cris						3	4	5					9.5
22	(Czech Republic) Tomáš Enge	(United Kingdom) Scuderia Ecosse	3			7		7	Ret	Ret					9
23	(Italy) Andrea Ceccato	(Italy) Ebimotors						5	6	4					8.5
24	(United Kingdom) Tim Sugden	(United Kingdom) Scuderia Ecosse						8	7	6	8			6	8.5
25	(United Kingdom) Rob Bell	(United Kingdom) Scuderia Ecosse									8		3		7
26	(Czech Republic) Jaroslav Janiš	(United Kingdom) Scuderia Ecosse			Ret		3	7	Ret	Ret					7
27	(Austria) Horst Felbermayr Jr.	(Germany) Team Felbermayr-Proton			3										6
28	(Italy) Stefano Gattuso	(Italy) Advanced Engineering										4			5
29	(Italy) Roberto Plati	(Italy) Easy Race						10	8	7					2.5
29	(Italy) Maurice Basso	(Italy) Easy Race						10	8	7					2.5
29	(Italy) Giampaolo Tenchini	(Italy) Easy Race						10	8	7					2.5
29	(United Kingdom) Bo McCormick	(Italy) Easy Race						10	8	7					2.5
30	(United Kingdom) Nigel Mansell	(United Kingdom) Scuderia Ecosse		7											2
30	(Austria) Horst Felbermayr	(Germany) Team Felbermayr-Proton			7										2
30	(Germany) Christian Ried	(Germany) Team Felbermayr-Proton			7										2
30	(Italy) Luciano Linossi	(Italy) Racing Team Edil Cris										7			2
30	(Austria) Philipp Peter	(Italy) Advanced Engineering											7		2
31	(Belgium) Rudi Penders	(Belgium) Prospeed Competition				8		Ret	Ret	Ret					1
31	(Belgium) Franz Lamot	(Belgium) Prospeed Competition				8		Ret	Ret	Ret					1
31	(United Kingdom) Paul Daniels	(United Kingdom) JWA						9	9	8					1
31	(United Kingdom) David Cox	(United Kingdom) JWA						9	9	8					1
31	(United Kingdom) Oliver Moorey	(United Kingdom) JWA						9	9	8					1
31	(Switzerland) Joël Camathias	(United Kingdom) JWA						9	9	8					1
31	(Germany) Marc Basseng	(Germany) Team Felbermayr-Proton	Ret												1
31	(Germany) Marc Basseng	(Belgium) Prospeed Competition												8	1
32	(United Kingdom) Jonny Kane	(United Kingdom) Scuderia Ecosse						7	Ret	Ret					1
Pos.	Driver	Team	ZHU (China)	SIL (United Kingdom)	BUC (Romania)	MON (Italy)	OSC (Germany)	6H	12H	24H	ADR (Italy)	BRN (Czech Republic)	NOG (France)	ZOL (Belgium)	Total points
Pos.	Driver	Team	ZHU (China)	SIL (United Kingdom)	BUC (Romania)	MON (Italy)	OSC (Germany)	SPA (Belgium)			ADR (Italy)	BRN (Czech Republic)	NOG (France)	ZOL (Belgium)	Total points

=== Citation Cup standings ===
The Citation Cup was contested by non-professional drivers competing in GT1 cars. It was limited to eight rounds, with Zhuhai and Spa not included.

Pos.	Driver	Team	SIL (United Kingdom)	BUC (Romania)	MON (Italy)	OSC (Germany)	ADR (Italy)	BRN (Czech Republic)	NOG (France)	ZOL (Belgium)	Total points
1	(United Kingdom) Ben Aucott	(Monaco) JMB Racing	2	2	2	1	1	1	1	1	74
2	(Belgium) Tom Cloet	(Belgium) SRT	1	1	1		2	3		2	52
3	(Netherlands) Peter Kutemann	(Monaco) JMB Racing	3	3	4	2	3	2	5	3	49
4	(United Kingdom) Joe Macari	(Monaco) JMB Racing	2	2	2	1					34
5	(Netherlands) Dirk Waaijenberg	(Monaco) JMB Racing	3	3	4					3	23
6	(France) Alain Ferté	(Monaco) JMB Racing					1	1			20
6	(France) Stéphane Daoudi	(Monaco) JMB Racing							1	1	20
7	(Netherlands) Antoine Gosse	(Monaco) JMB Racing				2		2	5		20
8	(France) Gilles Vannelet	(Belgium) SRT		1							16
8	(France) Gilles Vannelet	(Belgium) PSI Experience			3						16
8	(Italy) Mauro Casadei	(Belgium) SRT			1			3			16
9	(France) François Jakubowski	(France) Solution F	4		DNS				2		13
10	(France) Sébastien Carcon	(France) Red Racing	5		5				6		11
11	(Finland) Pertti Kuismanen	(Belgium) SRT	1								10
12	(Italy) Davide Amaduzzi	(Belgium) SRT					2				8
12	(Switzerland) Steve Zacchia	(France) Solution F							2		8
12	(Belgium) Maxime Soulet	(Belgium) SRT								2	8
13	(France) Thierry Stépec	(France) Red Racing	5		5						8
14	(Austria) Klaus Engelhorn	(Belgium) PSI Experience			3						6
14	(Switzerland) Henri Moser	(Monaco) JMB Racing					3				6
14	(France) Jean-Yves Adam	(France) Larbre Compétition							3		6
14	(France) Philippe Dumas	(France) Larbre Compétition							3		6
15	(Switzerland) François Labhardt	(France) Solution F	4		DNS						5
15	(France) Yvan Lebon	(Belgium) SRT							4		5
15	(France) Wilfried Merafina	(Belgium) SRT							4		5
16	(France) Nicolas Avenel	(France) Red Racing							6		3
16	(France) Thierry Prignaud	(France) Red Racing							6		3

== Teams' Championship ==
Points are awarded to the top 8 finishers in the order of 10–8–6–5–4–3–2–1 except at the Spa 24 Hours, where half points are also granted for the leaders after 6 and 12 hours. All results obtained by a maximum of two cars per team were taken into account.

=== GT1 Championship for Teams - standings ===
Pos.	Team	ZHU (China)	SIL (United Kingdom)	BUC (Romania)	MON (Italy)	OSC (Germany)	SPA (Belgium)			ADR (Italy)	BRN (Czech Republic)	NOG (France)	ZOL (Belgium)	Total points
Pos.	Team	ZHU (China)	SIL (United Kingdom)	BUC (Romania)	MON (Italy)	OSC (Germany)	6H	12H	24H	ADR (Italy)	BRN (Czech Republic)	NOG (France)	ZOL (Belgium)	Total points
1	(Germany) Vitaphone Racing Team	6	1	3	2	1	5	2	2	4	1	2	3	115
1	(Germany) Vitaphone Racing Team	7	6	6	4	8	6	4	4	13	7	3	5	115
2	(Italy) Scuderia Playteam Sarafree	Ret	5	1	8	2	2	3	5	2	4	6	8	63
2	(Italy) Scuderia Playteam Sarafree	Ret	8	Ret	9	4	11	9	9	Ret	5	7	Ret	63
3	(Austria) Jetalliance Racing	9	4	4	1	Ret	1	Ret	Ret	1	2	5	1	60
3	(Austria) Jetalliance Racing	12	11	Ret	7	Ret				8	10	9	9	60
4	(Netherlands) Carsport Holland	5	2	Ret	3	Ret	3	1	1	5	9	1	4	55
5	(Belgium) PK Carsport	3	3	5	5	DSQ	8	5	3	10	3	8	2	43.5
6	(Italy) Aston Martin Racing BMS	4	7	7	6	3	7	10	Ret	3	11	4	7	37
6	(Italy) Aston Martin Racing BMS	10	12	Ret	12	6	Ret	Ret	Ret	7	13	10	Ret	37
7	(Germany) All-Inkl.com Racing	1	9	2	10	5	Ret	Ret	Ret	9	6	12	12	25
7	(Germany) All-Inkl.com Racing	11	Ret	Ret	Ret	DSQ								25
8	(Belgium) PSI Experience	2	13		11								Ret	8
8	(Belgium) PSI Experience				15									8
9	(Germany) Reiter Lamborghini						12	11	Ret	6	8		6	7
10	(France) Luc Alphand Aventures						4	6	6					7
11	(Monaco) JMB Racing	13	15	9	14	7	10	8	7	11	12	11	10	4.5
11	(Monaco) JMB Racing		16	10	16	9				14	14	16	13	4.5
12	(Belgium) SRT		14	8	13		9	7	8	12	15	15	11	3
13	(United Kingdom) Barwell Motorsport	8	10											1
-	(France) Solution F		17		DNS							13		0
-	(France) Larbre Compétition											14		0
-	(Austria) Rbimmo Racing Team										16			0
-	(Switzerland) Kessel		Ret	Ret	DNS					Ret				0
-	(Germany) Phoenix Racing												Ret	0
-	(United Kingdom) Gigawave Motorsport												Ret	0

Colour	Result
Gold	Winner
Silver	Second place
Bronze	Third place
Green	Points classification
Blue	Non-points classification
Blue	Non-classified finish (NC)
Purple	Retired, not classified (Ret)
Red	Did not qualify (DNQ)
Red	Did not pre-qualify (DNPQ)
Black	Disqualified (DSQ)
White	Did not start (DNS)
White	Withdrew (WD)
White	Race cancelled (C)
Blank	Did not practice (DNP)
Blank	Did not arrive (DNA)
Blank	Excluded (EX)

=== GT2 Cup for Teams - standings ===
Pos.	Team	ZHU (China)	SIL (United Kingdom)	BUC (Romania)	MON (Italy)	OSC (Germany)	SPA (Belgium)			ADR (Italy)	BRN (Czech Republic)	NOG (France)	ZOL (Belgium)	Total points
Pos.	Team	ZHU (China)	SIL (United Kingdom)	BUC (Romania)	MON (Italy)	OSC (Germany)	6H	12H	24H	ADR (Italy)	BRN (Czech Republic)	NOG (France)	ZOL (Belgium)	Total points
1	(Italy) AF Corse Motorola	1	1	1	1	1	2	2	10	1	1	1	1	139
1	(Italy) AF Corse Motorola	2	Ret	DNS	2	4	Ret	Ret	Ret	2	2	Ret	5	139
2	(Italy) BMS Scuderia Italia	DSQ	4	2	Ret	2	1	1	1	3	5	2	4	64
3	(United Kingdom) Scuderia Ecosse	3	5	5	7	3	8	7	6	8	3	3	6	60.5
3	(United Kingdom) Scuderia Ecosse	5	7	Ret	9	6	7	Ret	Ret	DSQ	8	4	7	60.5
4	(Italy) Racing Team Edil Cris		2	6	3	5	3	4	5	6	7	5		52.5
4	(Italy) Racing Team Edil Cris		3	Ret	5	9				7	DSQ	8		52.5
5	(Italy) Ebimotors	4	Ret	4	4	8	5	6	4	4	6	6	2	43.5
6	(United Kingdom) Tech9 Motorsport	6	6	Ret	6	7	6	5	3	5	9			24.5
7	(France) IMSA Performance Matmut						4	3	2					13.5
8	(Italy) Advanced Engineering										4	7	3	13
9	(Germany) Team Felbermayr-Proton	Ret		3										6
10	(Italy) Easy Race						10	8	7					2.5
11	(Belgium) Prospeed Competition				8		Ret	Ret	Ret				8	2
12	(United Kingdom) JWA						9	9	8					1
-	(Monaco) JMB Racing						11	10	9					0

== Manufacturers' Cup ==
The Manufacturers’ Cups were awarded taking into consideration all results obtained by the four best classified cars of each manufacturer, in each category, at each event. Points are awarded to the top 8 finishers in the order of 10–8–6–5–4–3–2–1 except at the Spa 24 Hours.

=== GT1 Manufacturers Cup - standings ===
Pos	Manufacturer	Rd 1	Rd 2	Rd 3	Rd 4	Rd 5	Rd 6	Rd 7	Rd 8	Rd 9	Rd 10	Total
1	(Italy) Maserati	5	18	19	14	23	37.5	13	21	19	11	182.5
2	(United States) Corvette	18	14	5	10		34.5	4	6	11	13	115.5
3	(United Kingdom) Aston Martin	6	7	7	15	9	6	19	8	9	12	98
4	(Italy) Lamborghini	10		8		4		3	4		3	32

=== GT2 Manufacturers Cup - standings ===
Pos	Manufacturer	Rd 1	Rd 2	Rd 3	Rd 4	Rd 5	Rd 6	Rd 7	Rd 8	Rd 9	Rd 10	Total
1	(Italy) Ferrari	28	28	17	28	25	25.5	23	29	25	23	251.5
2	(Germany) Porsche	8	8	21	9	11	52.5	15	7	11	14	156.5

== Bibliography ==
- Loisy, Olivier (2007). FIA GT & GT3 European Championship 2007 Yearbook. Paris: Apollo Publishing. ISBN 978-2952104456.
