= 2007 FIA GT Nogaro 2 Hours =

Layout of the Circuit Paul Armagnac

The 2007 FIA GT Nogaro 2 Hours was the penultimate race of the 2007 FIA GT Championship season. It took place at Circuit Paul Armagnac, France, on September 30, 2007.

== Official results ==
Class winners in bold. Cars failing to complete 75% of winner's distance marked as Not Classified (NC). Cars with a C under their class are running in the Citation Cup, with the winner marked in bold italics.

| Pos | Class | No | Team | Drivers | Chassis | Tyre | Laps |
| Pos | Class | No | Team | Drivers | Engine | Tyre | Laps |
|---|---|---|---|---|---|---|---|
| 1 | **GT1** | **5** | **(Netherlands) Carsport Holland (Germany) Phoenix Racing** | **(Netherlands) Mike Hezemans (Switzerland) Jean-Denis Délétraz** | **Chevrolet Corvette C6.R** | MI | **81** |
| 1 | **GT1** | **5** | **(Netherlands) Carsport Holland (Germany) Phoenix Racing** | **(Netherlands) Mike Hezemans (Switzerland) Jean-Denis Délétraz** | **Chevrolet LS7-R 7.0L V8** | MI | **81** |
| 2 | GT1 | 1 | (Germany) Vitaphone Racing Team | (Germany) Michael Bartels (Italy) Thomas Biagi | Maserati MC12 GT1 | MI | 81 |
| 2 | GT1 | 1 | (Germany) Vitaphone Racing Team | (Germany) Michael Bartels (Italy) Thomas Biagi | Maserati 6.0L V12 | MI | 81 |
| 3 | GT1 | 2 | (Germany) Vitaphone Racing Team | (Portugal) Miguel Ramos (San Marino) Christian Montanari | Maserati MC12 GT1 | MI | 81 |
| 3 | GT1 | 2 | (Germany) Vitaphone Racing Team | (Portugal) Miguel Ramos (San Marino) Christian Montanari | Maserati 6.0L V12 | MI | 81 |
| 4 | GT1 | 23 | (Italy) Aston Martin Racing BMS | (United Kingdom) Jamie Davies (Italy) Fabio Babini | Aston Martin DBR9 | P | 81 |
| 4 | GT1 | 23 | (Italy) Aston Martin Racing BMS | (United Kingdom) Jamie Davies (Italy) Fabio Babini | Aston Martin 6.0L V12 | P | 81 |
| 5 | GT1 | 33 | (Austria) Jetalliance Racing | (Austria) Karl Wendlinger (United Kingdom) Ryan Sharp | Aston Martin DBR9 | MI | 81 |
| 5 | GT1 | 33 | (Austria) Jetalliance Racing | (Austria) Karl Wendlinger (United Kingdom) Ryan Sharp | Aston Martin 6.0L V12 | MI | 81 |
| 6 | GT1 | 11 | (Italy) Scuderia Playteam Sarafree | (Italy) Andrea Bertolini (Italy) Andrea Piccini | Maserati MC12 GT1 | P | 81 |
| 6 | GT1 | 11 | (Italy) Scuderia Playteam Sarafree | (Italy) Andrea Bertolini (Italy) Andrea Piccini | Maserati 6.0L V12 | P | 81 |
| 7 | GT1 | 12 | (Italy) Scuderia Playteam Sarafree | (Italy) Giambattista Giannoccaro (Italy) Alessandro Pier Guidi | Maserati MC12 GT1 | P | 81 |
| 7 | GT1 | 12 | (Italy) Scuderia Playteam Sarafree | (Italy) Giambattista Giannoccaro (Italy) Alessandro Pier Guidi | Maserati 6.0L V12 | P | 81 |
| 8 | GT1 | 4 | (Belgium) PK Carsport | (Belgium) Anthony Kumpen (Belgium) Bert Longin | Chevrolet Corvette C5-R | MI | 80 |
| 8 | GT1 | 4 | (Belgium) PK Carsport | (Belgium) Anthony Kumpen (Belgium) Bert Longin | Chevrolet LS7-R 7.0L V8 | MI | 80 |
| 9 | GT1 | 36 | (Austria) Jetalliance Racing | (Austria) Lukas Lichtner-Hoyer (Austria) Robert Lechner | Aston Martin DBR9 | MI | 80 |
| 9 | GT1 | 36 | (Austria) Jetalliance Racing | (Austria) Lukas Lichtner-Hoyer (Austria) Robert Lechner | Aston Martin 6.0L V12 | MI | 80 |
| 10 | GT1 | 22 | (Italy) Aston Martin Racing BMS | (Italy) Ferdinando Monfardini (France) Jean-Marc Gounon | Aston Martin DBR9 | P | 80 |
| 10 | GT1 | 22 | (Italy) Aston Martin Racing BMS | (Italy) Ferdinando Monfardini (France) Jean-Marc Gounon | Aston Martin 6.0L V12 | P | 80 |
| 11 | **GT1; C** | **16** | **(Monaco) JMB Racing** | **(United Kingdom) Ben Aucott (France) Stéphane Daoudi** | **Maserati MC12 GT1** | MI | **79** |
| 11 | **GT1; C** | **16** | **(Monaco) JMB Racing** | **(United Kingdom) Ben Aucott (France) Stéphane Daoudi** | **Maserati 6.0L V12** | MI | **79** |
| 12 | **GT2** | **51** | **(Italy) AF Corse Motorola** | **(Italy) Gianmaria Bruni (Monaco) Stéphane Ortelli** | **Ferrari F430 GT2** | MI | **79** |
| 12 | **GT2** | **51** | **(Italy) AF Corse Motorola** | **(Italy) Gianmaria Bruni (Monaco) Stéphane Ortelli** | **Ferrari 4.0L V8** | MI | **79** |
| 13 | GT2 | 97 | (Italy) BMS Scuderia Italia | (France) Emmanuel Collard (Italy) Matteo Malucelli | Porsche 997 GT3-RSR | P | 79 |
| 13 | GT2 | 97 | (Italy) BMS Scuderia Italia | (France) Emmanuel Collard (Italy) Matteo Malucelli | Porsche 3.8L Flat-6 | P | 79 |
| 14 | GT2 | 63 | (United Kingdom) Scuderia Ecosse | (United Kingdom) Robert Bell (United Kingdom) Andrew Kirkaldy | Ferrari F430 GT2 | P | 78 |
| 14 | GT2 | 63 | (United Kingdom) Scuderia Ecosse | (United Kingdom) Robert Bell (United Kingdom) Andrew Kirkaldy | Ferrari 4.0L V8 | P | 78 |
| 15 | GT2 | 62 | (United Kingdom) Scuderia Ecosse | (United Kingdom) Tim Mullen (United Kingdom) Darren Turner | Ferrari F430 GT2 | P | 78 |
| 15 | GT2 | 62 | (United Kingdom) Scuderia Ecosse | (United Kingdom) Tim Mullen (United Kingdom) Darren Turner | Ferrari 4.0L V8 | P | 78 |
| 16 | GT2 | 52 | (Italy) Racing Team Edil Cris | (Italy) Paolo Ruberti (Italy) Maurizio Mediani | Ferrari F430 GT2 | P | 78 |
| 16 | GT2 | 52 | (Italy) Racing Team Edil Cris | (Italy) Paolo Ruberti (Italy) Maurizio Mediani | Ferrari 4.0L V8 | P | 78 |
| 17 | GT2 | 74 | (Italy) Ebimotors | (Italy) Marcello Zani (France) Xavier Pompidou | Porsche 997 GT3-RSR | MI | 78 |
| 17 | GT2 | 74 | (Italy) Ebimotors | (Italy) Marcello Zani (France) Xavier Pompidou | Porsche 3.8L Flat-6 | MI | 78 |
| 18 | GT2 | 59 | (Italy) Advanced Engineering | (Austria) Philipp Peter (Portugal) Rui Águas | Ferrari F430 GT2 | MI | 78 |
| 18 | GT2 | 59 | (Italy) Advanced Engineering | (Austria) Philipp Peter (Portugal) Rui Águas | Ferrari 4.0L V8 | MI | 78 |
| 19 | GT1 | 7 | (Germany) All-Inkl.com Racing | (France) Christophe Bouchut (Germany) Stefan Mücke | Lamborghini Murcielago R-GT | MI | 77 |
| 19 | GT1 | 7 | (Germany) All-Inkl.com Racing | (France) Christophe Bouchut (Germany) Stefan Mücke | Lamborghini 6.0L V12 | MI | 77 |
| 20 | GT1; C | 14 | (France) Solution F | (France) François Jakubowski (Switzerland) Steve Zacchia | Ferrari 550-GTS Maranello | MI | 77 |
| 20 | GT1; C | 14 | (France) Solution F | (France) François Jakubowski (Switzerland) Steve Zacchia | Ferrari 5.9L V12 | MI | 77 |
| 21 | GT2 | 53 | (Italy) Racing Team Edil Cris | (Italy) Matteo Cressoni (Italy) Michele Rugolo | Ferrari F430 GT2 | P | 77 |
| 21 | GT2 | 53 | (Italy) Racing Team Edil Cris | (Italy) Matteo Cressoni (Italy) Michele Rugolo | Ferrari 4.0L V8 | P | 77 |
| 22 | GT1; C | 6 | (France) Larbre Compétition | (France) Jean-Yves Adam (France) Philippe Dumas | Ferrari 550-GTS Maranello | MI | 77 |
| 22 | GT1; C | 6 | (France) Larbre Compétition | (France) Jean-Yves Adam (France) Philippe Dumas | Ferrari 5.9L V12 | MI | 77 |
| 23 | GT1; C | 18 | (Belgium) Selleslagh Racing Team | (France) Yvan Lebon (France) Wilfried Merafina | Chevrolet Corvette C5-R | MI | 77 |
| 23 | GT1; C | 18 | (Belgium) Selleslagh Racing Team | (France) Yvan Lebon (France) Wilfried Merafina | Chevrolet LS7-R 7.0L V8 | MI | 77 |
| 24 | GT1; C | 15 | (Monaco) JMB Racing | (Netherlands) Peter Kutemann (France) Antoine Gosse | Maserati MC12 GT1 | MI | 76 |
| 24 | GT1; C | 15 | (Monaco) JMB Racing | (Netherlands) Peter Kutemann (France) Antoine Gosse | Maserati 6.0L V12 | MI | 76 |
| 25 | **G2** | **101** | **(Belgium) Belgian Racing** | **(Belgium) Bas Leinders (Belgium) Renaud Kuppens** | **Gillet Vertigo Streiff** | P | **75** |
| 25 | **G2** | **101** | **(Belgium) Belgian Racing** | **(Belgium) Bas Leinders (Belgium) Renaud Kuppens** | **Alfa Romeo 3.6L V6** | P | **75** |
| 26 | G2; C | 102 | (France) Red Racing | (Luxembourg) Sébastien Carcone (France) Thierry Prignaud (France) Nicolas Maillet Avenel | Chrysler Viper GTS-R | MI | 72 |
| 26 | G2; C | 102 | (France) Red Racing | (Luxembourg) Sébastien Carcone (France) Thierry Prignaud (France) Nicolas Maillet Avenel | Chrysler 8.0L V10 | MI | 72 |
| 27 DNF | GT2 | 50 | (Italy) AF Corse Motorola | (Finland) Toni Vilander (Germany) Dirk Müller | Ferrari F430 GT2 | MI | 37 |
| 27 DNF | GT2 | 50 | (Italy) AF Corse Motorola | (Finland) Toni Vilander (Germany) Dirk Müller | Ferrari 4.0L V8 | MI | 37 |

== Statistics ==
- Pole Position - #1 Vitaphone Racing Team - 1:23.763
- Average Speed - 146.21 km/h

FIA GT Championship
| Previous race: 2007 FIA GT Brno 2 Hours | 2007 season | Next race: 2007 FIA GT Zolder 2 Hours |
