= 2007 FIA GT Oschersleben 2 Hours =

Layout of the Motorsport Arena Oschersleben

The 2007 FIA GT Oschersleben 2 Hours was the fifth race of the 2007 FIA GT Championship season. It took place at Motorsport Arena Oschersleben on July 8, 2007.

The results of this race were pending due to an appeal by disqualified race winner PK Carsport. The FIA chose to allow the results stand following a review, although PK Carsport indicated it would still appeal through civil court.

== Official results ==
Class winners in bold. Cars failing to complete 75% of winner's distance marked as Not Classified (NC). Cars with a C under their class are running in the Citation Cup, with the winner marked in bold italics.

Pos	Class	No	Team	Drivers	Chassis	Tyre	Laps
Pos	Class	No	Team	Drivers	Engine	Tyre	Laps
1	**GT1**	**1**	**(Germany) Vitaphone Racing Team**	**(Germany) Michael Bartels (Italy) Thomas Biagi**	**Maserati MC12 GT1**	MI	**81**
1	**GT1**	**1**	**(Germany) Vitaphone Racing Team**	**(Germany) Michael Bartels (Italy) Thomas Biagi**	**Maserati 6.0L V12**	MI	**81**
2	GT1	11	(Italy) Scuderia Playteam Sarafree	(Italy) Andrea Bertolini (Italy) Andrea Piccini	Maserati MC12 GT1	P	80
2	GT1	11	(Italy) Scuderia Playteam Sarafree	(Italy) Andrea Bertolini (Italy) Andrea Piccini	Maserati 6.0L V12	P	80
3	GT1	23	(Italy) Aston Martin Racing BMS	(United Kingdom) Jamie Davies (Italy) Fabio Babini	Aston Martin DBR9	P	80
3	GT1	23	(Italy) Aston Martin Racing BMS	(United Kingdom) Jamie Davies (Italy) Fabio Babini	Aston Martin 6.0L V12	P	80
4	GT1	12	(Italy) Scuderia Playteam Sarafree	(Italy) Giambattista Giannoccaro (Italy) Alessandro Pier Guidi	Maserati MC12 GT1	P	80
4	GT1	12	(Italy) Scuderia Playteam Sarafree	(Italy) Giambattista Giannoccaro (Italy) Alessandro Pier Guidi	Maserati 6.0L V12	P	80
5	GT1	8	(Germany) All-Inkl.com Racing	(Netherlands) Jos Menten (Netherlands) Peter Kox	Lamborghini Murcielago R-GT	MI	80
5	GT1	8	(Germany) All-Inkl.com Racing	(Netherlands) Jos Menten (Netherlands) Peter Kox	Lamborghini 6.0L V12	MI	80
6	GT1	22	(Italy) Aston Martin Racing BMS	(Italy) Enrico Toccacelo (Italy) Ferdinando Monfardini	Aston Martin DBR9	P	78
6	GT1	22	(Italy) Aston Martin Racing BMS	(Italy) Enrico Toccacelo (Italy) Ferdinando Monfardini	Aston Martin 6.0L V12	P	78
7	**GT2**	**51**	**(Italy) AF Corse Motorola**	**(Italy) Gianmaria Bruni (Monaco) Stéphane Ortelli**	**Ferrari F430 GT2**	MI	**78**
7	**GT2**	**51**	**(Italy) AF Corse Motorola**	**(Italy) Gianmaria Bruni (Monaco) Stéphane Ortelli**	**Ferrari 4.0L V8**	MI	**78**
8	**GT1; C**	**16**	**(Monaco) JMB Racing**	**(United Kingdom) Joe Macari (United Kingdom) Ben Aucott**	**Maserati MC12 GT1**	MI	**77**
8	**GT1; C**	**16**	**(Monaco) JMB Racing**	**(United Kingdom) Joe Macari (United Kingdom) Ben Aucott**	**Maserati 6.0L V12**	MI	**77**
9	GT2	97	(Italy) BMS Scuderia Italia	(France) Emmanuel Collard (Italy) Matteo Malucelli	Porsche 997 GT3-RSR	P	77
9	GT2	97	(Italy) BMS Scuderia Italia	(France) Emmanuel Collard (Italy) Matteo Malucelli	Porsche 3.8L Flat-6	P	77
10	GT2	62	(United Kingdom) Scuderia Ecosse	(United Kingdom) Tim Mullen (Czech Republic) Jaroslav Janiš	Ferrari F430 GT2	P	77
10	GT2	62	(United Kingdom) Scuderia Ecosse	(United Kingdom) Tim Mullen (Czech Republic) Jaroslav Janiš	Ferrari 4.0L V8	P	77
11	GT2	50	(Italy) AF Corse Motorola	(Finland) Toni Vilander (Germany) Dirk Müller	Ferrari F430 GT2	MI	77
11	GT2	50	(Italy) AF Corse Motorola	(Finland) Toni Vilander (Germany) Dirk Müller	Ferrari 4.0L V8	MI	77
12	GT2	52	(Italy) Racing Team Edil Cris	(Italy) Paolo Ruberti (France) Damien Pasini	Ferrari F430 GT2	P	76
12	GT2	52	(Italy) Racing Team Edil Cris	(Italy) Paolo Ruberti (France) Damien Pasini	Ferrari 4.0L V8	P	76
13	GT1	2	(Germany) Vitaphone Racing Team	(Portugal) Miguel Ramos (San Marino) Christian Montanari	Maserati MC12 GT1	MI	76
13	GT1	2	(Germany) Vitaphone Racing Team	(Portugal) Miguel Ramos (San Marino) Christian Montanari	Maserati 6.0L V12	MI	76
14	GT2	63	(United Kingdom) Scuderia Ecosse	(Canada) Chris Niarchos (United Kingdom) Andrew Kirkaldy	Ferrari F430 GT2	P	75
14	GT2	63	(United Kingdom) Scuderia Ecosse	(Canada) Chris Niarchos (United Kingdom) Andrew Kirkaldy	Ferrari 4.0L V8	P	75
15	GT1; C	15	(Monaco) JMB Racing	(Netherlands) Antoine Gosse (Netherlands) Peter Kutemann	Maserati MC12 GT1	MI	74
15	GT1; C	15	(Monaco) JMB Racing	(Netherlands) Antoine Gosse (Netherlands) Peter Kutemann	Maserati 6.0L V12	MI	74
16	GT2	99	(United Kingdom) Tech9 Motorsport	(Russia) Leo Machitski (United Kingdom) Sean Edwards	Porsche 997 GT3-RSR	MI	74
16	GT2	99	(United Kingdom) Tech9 Motorsport	(Russia) Leo Machitski (United Kingdom) Sean Edwards	Porsche 3.8L Flat-6	MI	74
17	GT2	74	(Italy) Ebimotors	(Italy) Emanuele Busnelli (Italy) Marcello Zani	Porsche 997 GT3-RSR	MI	65
17	GT2	74	(Italy) Ebimotors	(Italy) Emanuele Busnelli (Italy) Marcello Zani	Porsche 3.8L Flat-6	MI	65
18	GT2	53	(Italy) Racing Team Edil Cris	(Italy) Matteo Cressoni (Italy) Michele Rugolo	Ferrari F430 GT2	P	56
18	GT2	53	(Italy) Racing Team Edil Cris	(Italy) Matteo Cressoni (Italy) Michele Rugolo	Ferrari 4.0L V8	P	56
19 DNF	GT1	33	(Austria) Jetalliance Racing	(Austria) Karl Wendlinger (United Kingdom) Ryan Sharp	Aston Martin DBR9	MI	40
19 DNF	GT1	33	(Austria) Jetalliance Racing	(Austria) Karl Wendlinger (United Kingdom) Ryan Sharp	Aston Martin 6.0L V12	MI	40
20 DNF	GT1	5	(Netherlands) Carsport Holland (Germany) Phoenix Racing	(Netherlands) Mike Hezemans (Switzerland) Jean-Denis Délétraz	Chevrolet Corvette C6.R	MI	21
20 DNF	GT1	5	(Netherlands) Carsport Holland (Germany) Phoenix Racing	(Netherlands) Mike Hezemans (Switzerland) Jean-Denis Délétraz	Chevrolet 7.0L V8	MI	21
21 DNF	GT1	36	(Austria) Jetalliance Racing	(Austria) Lukas Lichtner-Hoyer (Austria) Robert Lechner	Aston Martin DBR9	MI	1
21 DNF	GT1	36	(Austria) Jetalliance Racing	(Austria) Lukas Lichtner-Hoyer (Austria) Robert Lechner	Aston Martin 6.0L V12	MI	1
DSQ^{†}	GT1	4	(Belgium) PK Carsport	(Belgium) Anthony Kumpen (Belgium) Bert Longin	Chevrolet Corvette C5-R	MI	81
DSQ^{†}	GT1	4	(Belgium) PK Carsport	(Belgium) Anthony Kumpen (Belgium) Bert Longin	Chevrolet 7.0L V8	MI	81
DSQ^{†}	GT1	7	(Germany) All-Inkl.com Racing	(France) Christophe Bouchut (Germany) Stefan Mücke	Lamborghini Murcielago R-GT	MI	81
DSQ^{†}	GT1	7	(Germany) All-Inkl.com Racing	(France) Christophe Bouchut (Germany) Stefan Mücke	Lamborghini 6.0L V12	MI	81

† – #4 PK Carsport and #7 All-Inkl.com Racing entries were both disqualified for failing post-race inspection. The #4 PK Carsport entry was the race winner prior to disqualification, but had a fuel tank 1.3 liters larger than the legal limit. The #7 All-Inkl.com Racing entry had a gearbox final gear ratio that was not approved by the FIA.

== Statistics ==
- Pole Position – #4 PK Carsport – 1:24.492
- Average Speed – 146.70 km/h

FIA GT Championship
Previous race: 2007 FIA GT Monza 2 Hours	2007 season	Next race: 2007 Spa 24 Hours
