= Andrea Ceccato =

- Born: 26 January 1985 (age 41) Italy
- Height: 1.87 m (6 ft 2 in)
- Weight: 110 kg (243 lb; 17 st 5 lb)

Rugby union career
- Position: Prop
- Current team: Mogliano
Youth career
- Ruggers Tarvisium
Senior career
Years	Team	Apps	(Points)
2006−2010	Benetton Treviso	41	(5)
2010−2016	Mogliano	118	(47)
2016−2020	San Donà	63	(35)
2020−2023	Mogliano	39	(15)
- Correct as of 22 November 2020
International career
Years	Team	Apps	(Points)
2006	Italy Under 21	3	(0)
2009	Italy A	3	(0)
- Correct as of 22 November 2020

Andrea Ceccato (born 26 January 1985) is an Italian rugby union player. His usual position is as a Prop and he currently plays for Mogliano in Top12.

In 2006, Ceccato was named in the Italy Under 21 and in 2009, he was also named in the Italy A squad for 2009 IRB Nations Cup.
