= Giambattista Giannoccaro =

Italian racing driver and entrepreneur (born 1960)

Giambattista Giannoccaro (born 22 October 1960 in Fasano, Italy) is an Italian racing driver and entrepreneur. He owns his own racing team, Scuderia Playteam, which he has competed for.

Giannoccaro is an Italian GT Champion and Spanish GT Champion. He also competed in the FIA GT Championship in the 2007 season with his own team. He finished first in the GT2 Class in the 2006 Mil Milhas.

Giannoccaro tested for his own team for A.C. Milan in the 2008 Superleague Formula season. He won the Spanish GT Championship in 2006 with the Ferrari 360 GTC and the Italian GT Championship with the Maserati MC12 pairing with the Finnish car mate Tony Vilander.

Giannoccaro founded and managed Playteam Soleja, an Advertising and Sports Marketing Agency, managing communication activities for brands such as BMW, Luxottica, Pirelli, Enel, Sara Assicurazioni, Auchan, Abarth to name a few.

Among the various Playteam achievements is the making of the film for the 2006 Turin Winter Olympics, broadcast worldwide during the Opening Ceremony and the advertising campaign "Romania Piacere di conoscerti" commissioned by the Romanian Government in 2008.

Between 2004 and 2006, Playteam also promoted the Italian Golf leg of the Ladies European Tour, with BMW as title sponsor.

In 2012, Giannoccaro set sail with his wife on their Outremer 55 catamaran for a cruise around the world, to remote destinations such as the Galapagos Islands, Easter Island, and Patagonia, and in February 2016, they became the first to reach the Antarctic polar circle by catamaran.
