= Stéphane Lémeret =

Belgian racing driver (born 1973)

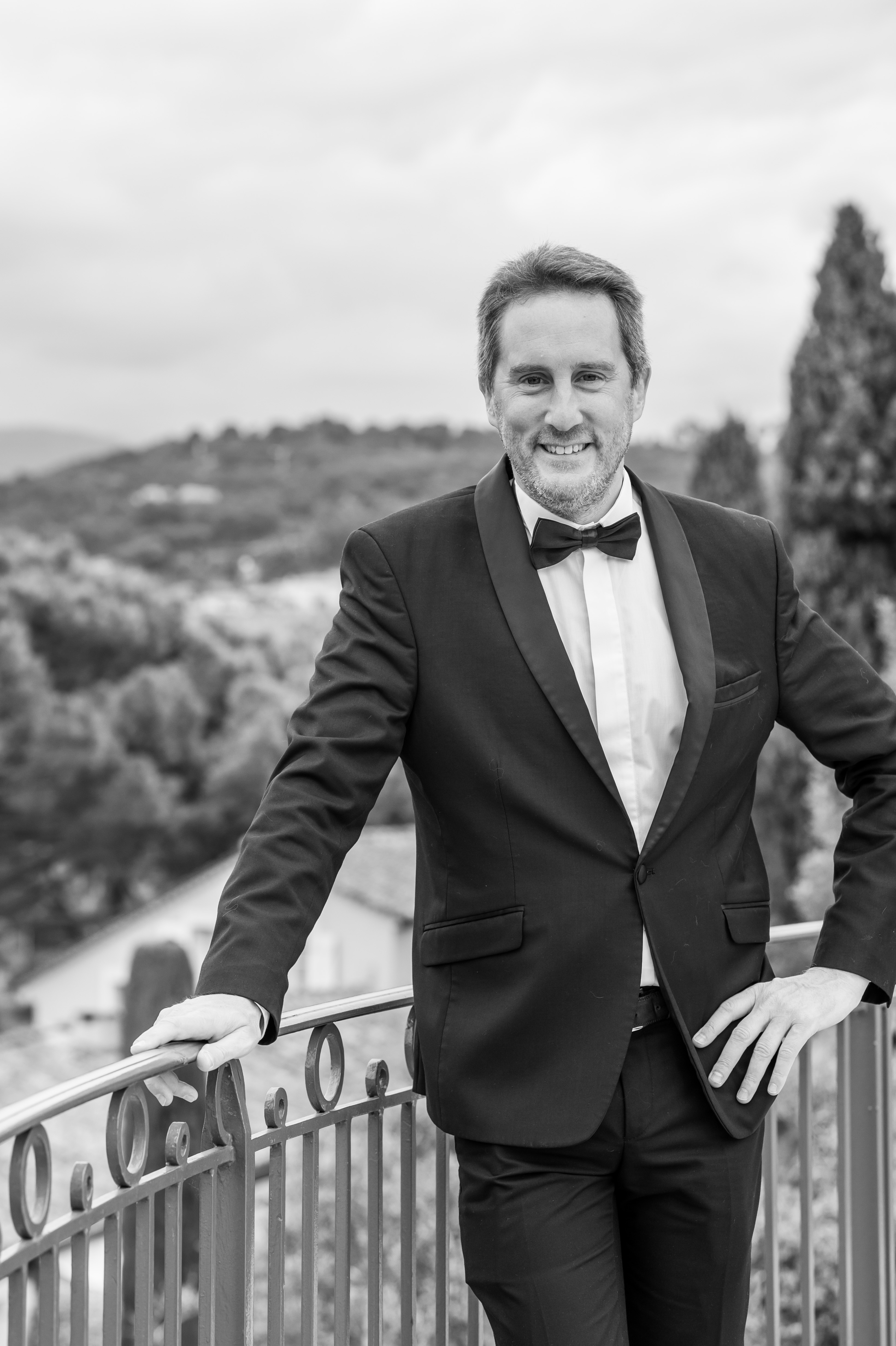
- Lémeret in 2019
- Nationality: (Belgium) Belgian
- Born: 4 September 1973 (age 53) Brussels, Belgium
- Categorisation: FIA Silver (until 2014, 2017–2023); FIA Bronze (2015–2016, 2024–)

Championship titles
- 2025 2016 1999, 2002: French GT4 Cup – Am; TCR BeNeLux Touring Car Championship; Renault Clio Cup Belgium

Stéphane Lémeret (born 4 September 1973) is a Belgian journalist and racing driver who last competed in the French GT4 Cup for CMR. He has entered the Spa 24 Hours a total of 24 times, with a joint-best finish of second overall in 2006 for Phoenix, and 2008 and 2009 for Vitaphone.

== Journalism ==
Alongside his racing career, Lémeret has been writing car reviews since the age of 18, and currently serves as the editor-in-chief for autotrends.be, as well as the only French-speaking Belgian in the European Car of the Year jury. Additionally, Lémeret has published one book, a psychological thriller titled J'ai créé le Covid-19. Pardon ! (2020).

== Career ==
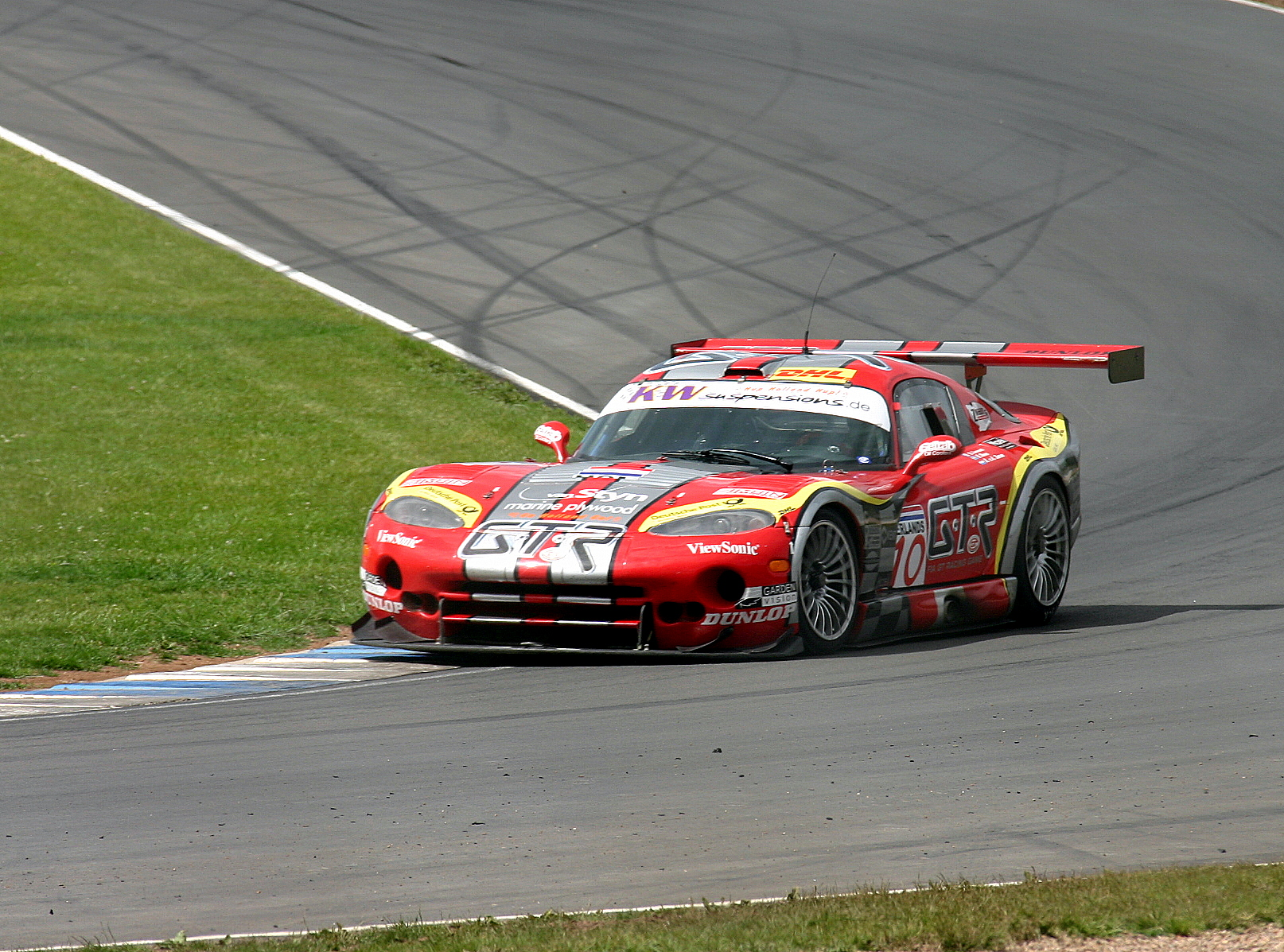
Lémeret settled into FIA GT in 2004 with Chrysler (pictured at Donington Park).

Lémeret made his car racing debut in 1996, racing in the Spa 24 Hours for Mühlner Motorsport. Across the following seven years, Lémeret made six appearances in the Belgian enduro, during which he won the Renault Clio Cup Belgium title in 1999 and 2002. In 2004, Lémeret joined Zwaans GTR Racing Team to compete in select rounds of the FIA GT Championship in the GT class, driving a Chrysler Viper GTS-R. The following year, Lémeret made a one-off appearance in the GT1 class of the Le Mans Endurance Series for Graham Nash Motorsport, before making select appearances in the FIA GT Championship for Ferrari-affiliated GPC Sport in the GT2 and GT1 classes.

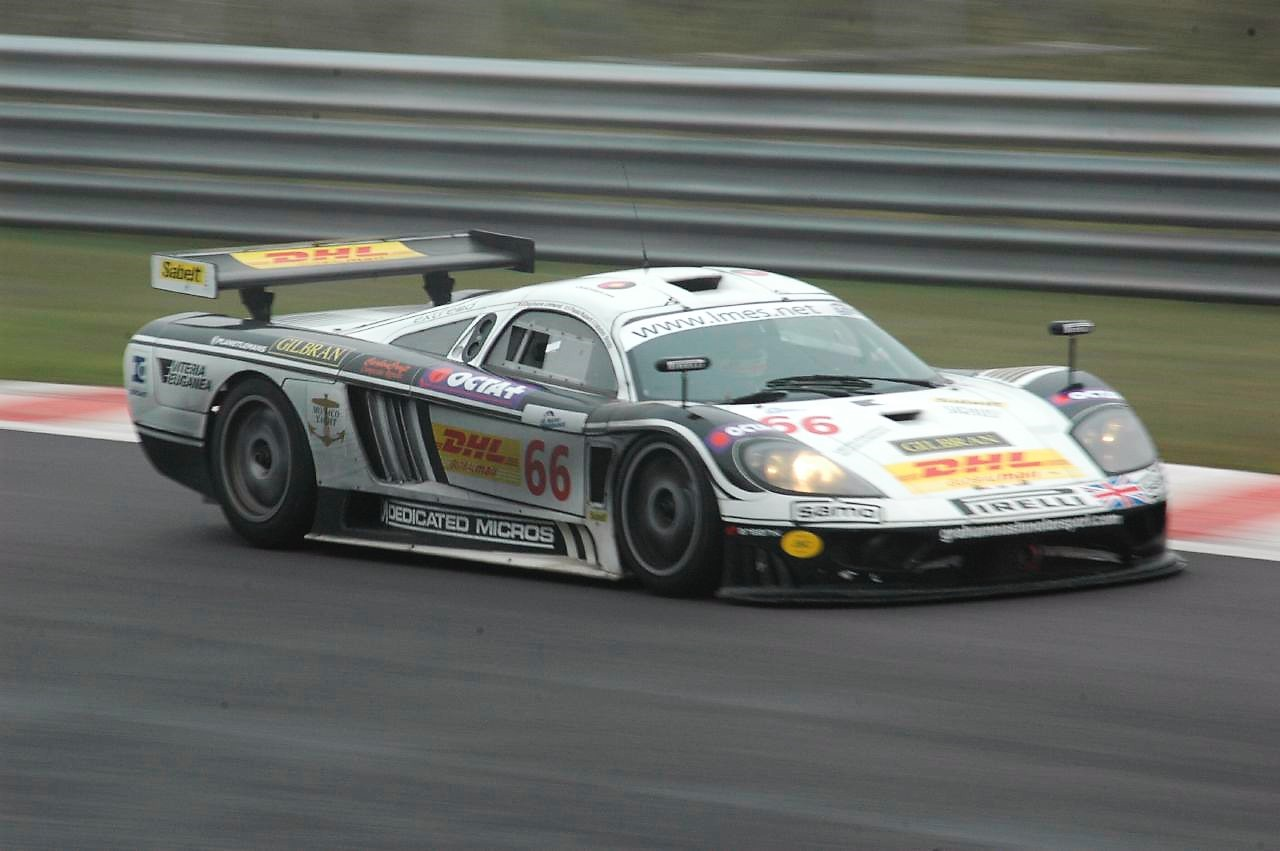
Lémeret driving his Saleen S7-R at the 2005 1000km of Spa.

In 2006, Lémeret finished second overall at the Spa 24 Hours for Phoenix Racing driving an Aston Martin DBR9 alongside Andrea Piccini, Jean-Denis Délétraz and Marcel Fässler. During the year, Lémeret also a one-off appearance in the Le Mans Series, driving for G-Force Racing at the 1000 km of Spa in LMP2. The following year, Lémeret finished fourth at the Spa 24 Hours for Maserati-fielding Vitaphone Racing Team, as well as racing for Ice Pol Racing Team in select rounds of the GT2 class of the Le Mans Series. During 2007, Lémeret also raced at the 24 Hours of Nürburgring and made one-off appearances in ADAC GT Masters and the THP Spider Cup for Phoenix Racing and Boutsen Energy Racing, respectively.

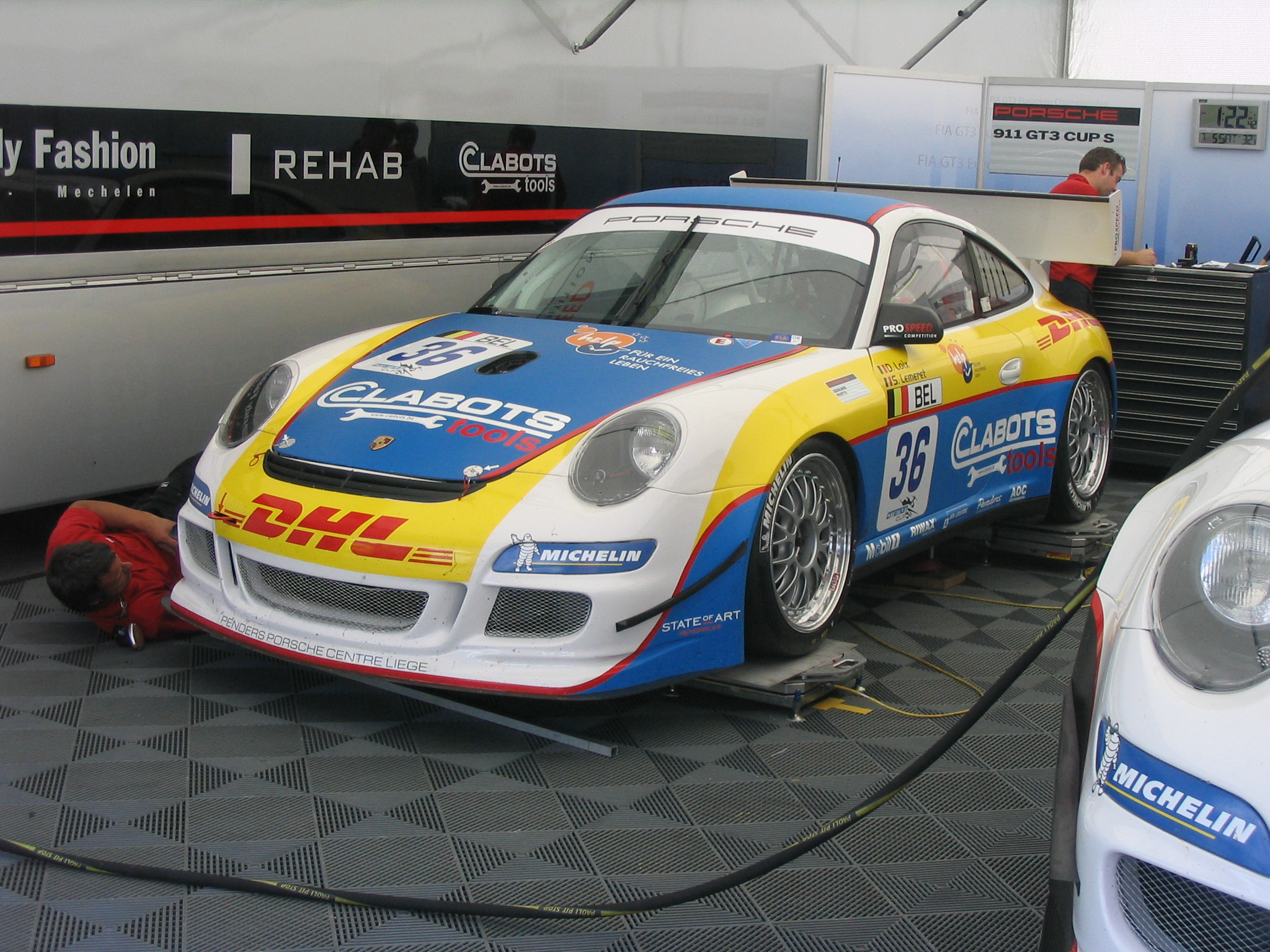
Lémeret's FIA GT3 Porsche, sitting in its tent at Oschersleben in 2008.

Lémeret then began 2008 by finishing third overall and first in SP1 at the Dubai 24 Hour for Delahaye 2 Renault Belgium, before finishing second at the Spa 24 Hours for Vitaphone Racing Team. In parallel, Lémeret raced in the FIA GT3 European Championship, in which he began the season for Ascari-fielding Gravity Racing International before switching to Porsche customer team Prospeed Competition for the rest of the year. Starting 2009 driving for VDS Racing Adventures, Lémeret finished second in the SP2 class at the Dubai 24 Hour before winning the 12 Hours of Dakar overall. Across the rest of 2009, Lémeret primarily raced in the GT1 class of FIA GT Championship for Saleen-fielding Full Speed Racing, but scored his best result of second at the Spa 24 Hours on a one-off return to Vitaphone Racing. During 2009, Lémeret also finished third in the LMGT1 category of the Asian Le Mans Series for fellow Saleen customer team Larbre Compétition, and second in the GT1 class at the 1000 km of Algarve for the same team.

The following year, Lémeret joined Audi-affiliated WRT to race in the French GT Championship, scoring a lone podium at Magny-Cours to finish sixth in points. During 2010, Lémeret also finished second at the Dubai 24 Hour, as well as scoring a lone podium in the FIA GT3 European Championship for Saintéloc Phoenix Racing at Jarama. In 2011, Lémeret joined Ferrari-affiliated AF Corse to race in the LMGTE Am class of the Le Mans Series, scoring a best result of second twice and ending the year runner-up in points. During 2011, Lémeret also finished runner-up in the S1 class of the Belgian Touring Car Series, as well as finishing third overall at the 24 Hours of Spa for Mercedes-fielding Black Falcon. Lémeret then finished second in the SP2 class in the following year's Dubai 24 Hour for VDS Racing Adventures, before competing in the first four rounds of that year's Blancpain Endurance Series for DB Motorsport, driving a BMW Z4 GT3.

A Gentlemen class podium for Sport Garage at the 24 Hours of Spa then ensued in 2013, before splitting the following year's Blancpain Endurance Series season with Sport Garage and Delahaye Racing. Returning to full-time racing in 2015, Lémeret continued with Ferrari-fielding Sport Garage to race in the FFSA GT Championship, scoring wins at Le Mans and Spa and four other podiums en route to a third-place points finish. During 2015, Lémeret also won the 24 Hours of Spa in the Pro-Am class for AF Corse, as well as racing with the team for a one-off appearance in the International GT Open. Remaining with the Italian team for 2016, Lémeret raced with them in the Blancpain GT Series Sprint Cup, as well as select races in the Blancpain GT Series Endurance Cup and International GT Open. Racing primarily in the Sprint Cup's Am class, Lémeret won all but one of the eight races he contested as he ended the year runner-up in the class' standings. In parallel, Lémeret also raced in the TCR BeNeLux Touring Car Championship for Boutsen Ginion Racing, scoring three wins and seven other podiums to become the series' first champion. In late 2016, Lémeret joined DH Racing to race in the final three rounds of the 2015–16 Asian Le Mans Series in the GT class, taking a win at Fuji and finishing the season fourth in points.

Remaining with Boutsen Ginion Racing to race in select rounds of the following year's TCR BeNeLux Touring Car Championship, Lémeret scored a lone win at Zandvoort and three other podiums to finish 11th in points. During 2017, Lémeret also made his debut at the 24 Hours of Le Mans, racing for Proton Competition in the LMGTE Am class alongside Klaus Bachler and Khaled Al Qubaisi. The following year, Lémeret switched to BMW-fielding 3Y Technology to race in the GT4 European Series, scoring a best result of fourth at Brands Hatch to end the year 18th in the Silver cup points. Continuing in GT4 competition for 2019, Lémeret joined Alpine-fielding CMR to race in the French GT4 Cup, winning both races at Nogaro, before taking further wins at Lédenon and Spa to secure runner-up honors overall. During 2019, Lémeret also raced at the 24 Hours of Spa in the Invitational class for 1969 Tribute.

Backside image of Lémeret's GT4 Toyota in its garage at Magny-Cours in 2022.

Continuing with CMR for 2020, as they switched to Toyota machinery, to return to the GT4 European Series, Lémeret scored an overall win at Spa and a Silver cup win at Zandvoort, as well as three other podiums to end the year third in the class standings. During 2020, Lémeret also won the 24 Hours of Spa in the Am class for the same team, driving a Bentley Continental GT3. The following year, Lémeret continued with the team as he drove for them in both the GT4 European Series and the French GT4 Cup. Driving a Toyota Supra in the former, Lémeret scored an overall win at Le Castellet, a class win at Barcelona and five other podiums to end the year runner-up in the Silver cup standings. Driving an Alpine A110 in the latter, Lémeret took a lone win at Albi and two other Silver class podiums en route to a seventh-place points finish.

Staying in the French GT4 Cup with CMR, as the team began fielding Toyotas in the series the following year, Lémeret took a lone win at Spa and four other podiums en route to a fourth-place points finish in the Silver cup standings. During 2022, Lémeret also raced for the team in select rounds of the GT World Challenge Europe Endurance Cup, as well as racing for Selleslagh Racing Team for a one-off appearance in the GT4 European Series. Continuing in the French GT4 Cup for 2023, Lémeret scored Silver cup podiums at Nogaro and Lédenon en route to a sixth-place points finish. At the end of the year, Lémeret raced in the Gulf 12 Hours for AF Corse.

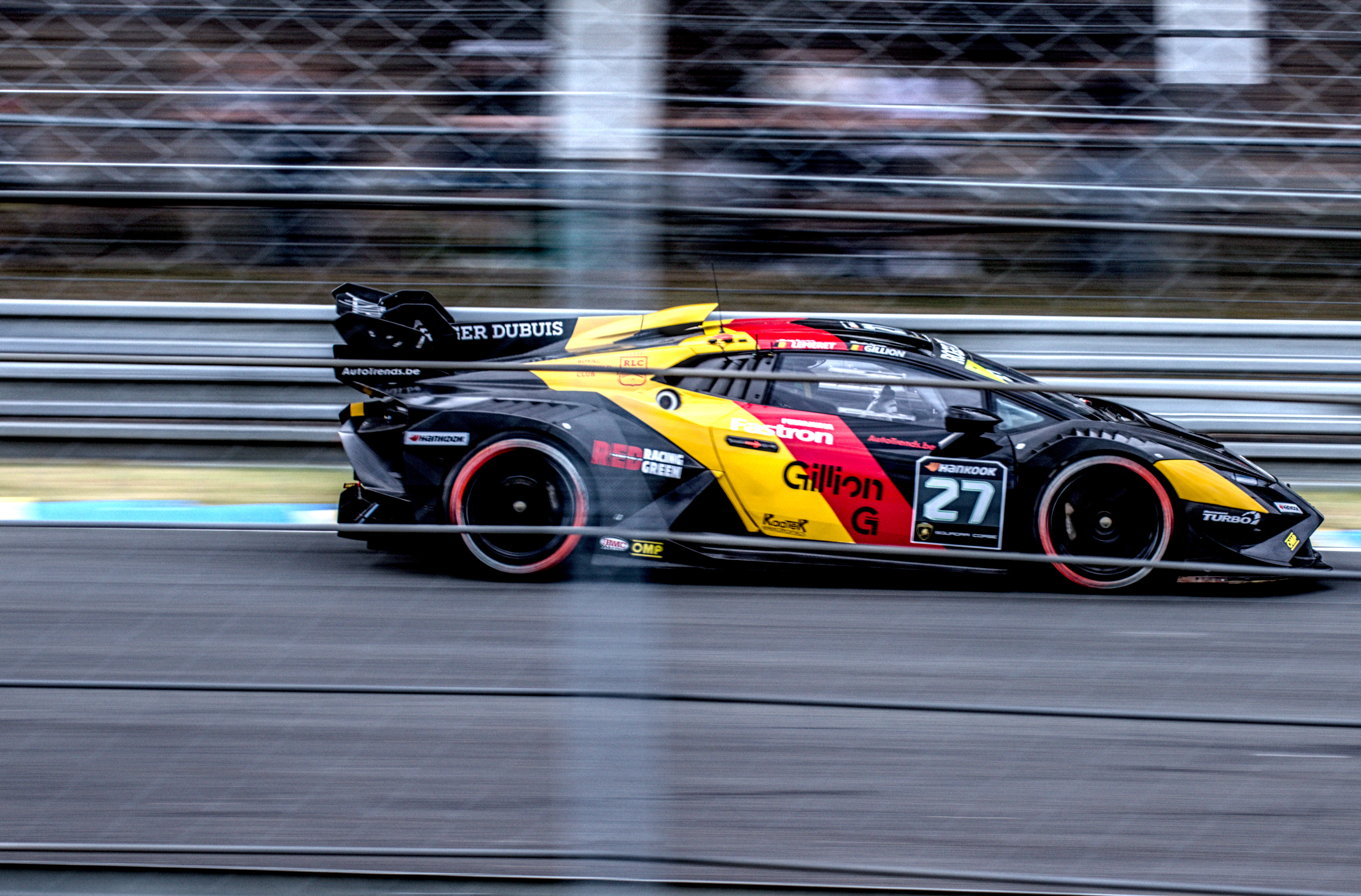
Lémeret racing Lamborghini Super Trofeo in one of the 2024 24 Hours of Le Mans' support races.

In 2024, Lémeret returned to CMR to race in full-time in the AM classes of both the French GT4 Cup and Lamborghini Super Trofeo Europe. In the former, Lémeret won both races at Magny-Cours, race two at Spa and took six more podiums to secure runner-up honors in points. During 2024, Lémeret also made a one-off appearance for the same team in the GT4 European Series at Spa, scoring a class podium in race one. At the end of the year, Lémeret raced in the Sepang round of the 2024–25 Asian Le Mans Series for Ultimate in LMP3, winning both races in class from pole position.

Returning to CMR for 2025, Lémeret won the 6 Hours of Barcelona in Cup 4 at the start of the year, before remaining with the team for the rest of the year to race in the Am classes of the French GT4 Cup and Lamborghini Super Trofeo Europe. In the former, Lémeret scored six class wins and two further podiums to secure the Am title, whereas in the latter, he took a lone class win Barcelona and one other podium to end the year fifth in points despite missing one round. During 2025, Lémeret also raced at the 24 Hours of Spa for AF Corse in the Pro-Am class, as well as competing in the Road to Le Mans with CD Sport in LMP3 Pro-Am. The following year, Lémeret returned to CMR for another season in the Am class of the French GT4 Cup and Lamborghini Super Trofeo Europe. In the latter, Lémeret took class wins at Le Castellet and the Nürburgring en route to runner-up honours in Am with five other podiums to his name. During 2026, Lémeret made a one-off return to GT3 machinery in Le Mans Cup's Silverstone round with Aston Martin-fielding Code Racing Development, in which he finished fourth after taking pole.

== Racing record ==
=== Racing career summary ===
Season	Series	Team	Races	Wins	Poles	F/Laps	Podiums	Points	Position
1996	Spa 24 Hours – Spa 2.0	Mühlner Motorsport	1	0	0	0	0	—N/a	**2nd**
1997	Spa 24 Hours – SP	Colsoul Racing	1	0	0	0	0	—N/a	DNF
1998	Belgian Procar	Opel Team Mühlner						14	45th
1998	Spa 24 Hours – SP	Mühlner Motorsport	1	0	0	0	0	—N/a	18th
1999	Renault Clio Cup Belgium								**1st**
1999	Spa 24 Hours – SP	Team Renault Sport Belgium	1	0	0	0	0	—N/a	DNF
2000	Belgian Procar	RJN Motorsport; Motorsport International						35	24th
2000	Spa 24 Hours – SP	RJN Motorsport	1	0	0	0	0	—N/a	DNF
2001	Coupe d'Europe Renault							8	23rd
2002	Renault Clio Cup Belgium								**1st**
2002	Spa 24 Hours – GTN	Ice Pol Racing Team	1	0	0	0	0	—N/a	4th
2003	Spa 24 Hours – G2	Racing Team Belgium	1	0	0	0	0	—N/a	7th
2004	FIA GT Championship – GT	Zwaans GTR Racing Team	5	0	0	0	0	5	34th
2005	Le Mans Endurance Series – GT1	Graham Nash Motorsport	1	0	0	0	0	0	NC
2005	FIA GT Championship – GT2	GPC Sport	2	0	0	0	0	2	27th
2005	FIA GT Championship – GT1	GPC Sport	2	0	0	0	0	4.5	27th
2005	Porsche Supercup	Porsche AG	1	0	0	0	0	0	NC
2006	Le Mans Series – LMP2	G-Force Racing	1	0	0	0	0	0	NC
2006	FIA GT Championship – GT1	Phoenix Racing	1	0	0	0	1	18	14th
2007	Belcar	Gravity International Racing							
2007	Le Mans Series – GT2	Ice Pol Racing Team	2	0	0	0	0	5	22nd
2007	FIA GT Championship – GT1	Vitaphone Racing Team	1	0	0	0	0	9	19th
2007	24 Hours of Nürburgring – SP8		1	0	0	0	0	—N/a	7th
2007	ADAC GT Masters	Phoenix Racing	2	0	0	0	0	0	NC
2007	THP Spider Cup	Boutsen Energy Racing	2	0	0	0	0	18	17th
2008	Dubai 24 Hour – SP1	Delahaye 2 Renault Belgium	1	1	0	0	1	—N/a	**1st**
2008	Dubai 24 Hour – SP1	Delahaye 1 Renault Belgium	1	0	0	0	0	—N/a	DNF
2008	Le Mans Series – GT2	James Watt Automotive	0	0	0	0	0	0	NC
2008	FIA GT3 European Championship	Gravity Racing International	2	0	0	0	0	2	27th
2008	FIA GT3 European Championship	Prospeed Competition	9	0	0	0	0	2	27th
2008	FIA GT Championship – GT1	Vitaphone Racing Team	1	0	0	0	1	16	13th
2009	Dubai 24 Hour – SP2	VDS Racing Adventures	1	0	0	0	1	—N/a	**2nd**
2009	12 Hours of Dakar	VDS Racing Adventures	1	1	0	0	1	—N/a	**1st**
2009	FIA GT Championship – GT1	Full Speed Racing	5	0	0	0	0	13	10th
2009	FIA GT Championship – GT1	Vitaphone Racing Team DHL	1	0	0	0	1	13	10th
2009	FIA GT Championship – GT2	BMS Scuderia Italia	1	0	0	0	0	0	NC
2009	Asian Le Mans Series – LMGT1	Larbre Compétition	2	0	0	0	1	14	**3rd**
2009	Le Mans Series – GT1	Larbre Compétition	1	0	0	0	1	8	11th
2009	Formula Le Mans Cup	DAMS	2	0	0	0	0	12	26th
2009	Belgian Touring Car Series – S1	Boutsen Energy Racing						62	11th
2010	Dubai 24 Hour – SP2	VDS Racing Adventures	1	0	0	0	1	—N/a	**2nd**
2010	Dubai 24 Hour – SP2	Gravity Racing International	1	0	0	0	1	—N/a	**3rd**
2010	FIA GT3 European Championship	Saintéloc Phoenix Racing	5	0	0	0	1	24	20th
2010	FIA GT3 European Championship	Team Rosberg	2	0	0	0	0	24	20th
2010	French GT Championship	WRT	13	0	1	0	2	86	6th
2010	24 Hours of Spa – GT3	WRT	1	0	0	0	0	—N/a	5th
2010	Le Mans Series – GT1	Atlas FX-Team FS	1	0	0	0	0	0	NC
2010	Belgian Touring Car Series – S1	Chad Racing						17	29th
2011	Le Mans Series – LMGTE Am	AF Corse	5	0	0	0	3	58	**2nd**
2011	Intercontinental Le Mans Cup – LMGTE Am	AF Corse	2	0	0	0	1	0	NC
2011	Belgian Touring Car Series – S1	Delahaye Racing Team 2	14	1	4	0	11	177	**2nd**
2011	FIA GT3 European Championship	Fischer Racing	2	0	0	0	0	0	60th
2011	Blancpain Endurance Series – GT3 Pro	Black Falcon	1	0	0	0	1	19.5	19th
2011–12	Porsche GT3 Challenge Middle East	Al Nabooda Racing	6	0	0	0	2	86	7th
2012	Dubai 24 Hour – SP2	VDS Racing Adventures	1	0	0	0	1	—N/a	**2nd**
2012	Blancpain Endurance Series – Pro	DB Motorsport	4	0	0	0	0	21	17th
2013	Blancpain Endurance Series – Gentlemen	Saintéloc Racing	1	0	0	0	0	37	11th
2013	Blancpain Endurance Series – Gentlemen	Sport Garage	1	0	0	0	1	37	11th
2013	Eurocup Clio	Team Lompech Sport	3	0	0	0	0	2	21st
2014	Blancpain Endurance Series – Pro-Am	Sport Garage	3	0	0	0	0	14	20th
2014	Blancpain Endurance Series – Am	Delahaye Racing	1	0	0	0	0	17	24th
2014	FFSA GT Championship	Sport Garage	2	0	0	0	0	12	22nd
2015	FFSA GT Championship	Sport Garage	13	2	1	1	6	150	**3rd**
2015	Blancpain Endurance Series – Pro-Am	AF Corse	1	1	0	0	1	46	6th
2015	International GT Open – Am	AF Corse	2	0	0	0	2	7	10th
2016	International GT Open – Am	AF Corse	6	1	3	1	6	0	NC
2016	Blancpain GT Series Sprint Cup – Am	AF Corse	8	7	4	7	8	134	**2nd**
2016	Blancpain GT Series Endurance Cup – Am	AF Corse	2	0	0	0	0	27	15th
2016	Blancpain GT Series Endurance Cup – Am	Kaspersky Motorsport	1	0	0	0	0	27	15th
2016	Intercontinental GT Challenge – Am	Kaspersky Motorsport	1	0	0	0	0	0	NC
2016	TCR BeNeLux Touring Car Championship	Boutsen Ginion Racing	18	3	2	0	10	487	**1st**
2016–17	Asian Le Mans Series – GT	DH Racing	3	1	0	0	2	50	4th
2017	TCR BeNeLux Touring Car Championship	Boutsen Ginion Racing	15	1	0	0	4	175	11th
2017	24 Hours of Le Mans – LMGTE Am	Proton Competition	1	0	0	0	0	—N/a	DNF
2017	24H Series – SP2	VDS Racing Adventures	1	0	0	0	0	0	NC
2017	GT & Prototype Challenge – LMP2	Equipe Verschuur	2	1	1	1	2	49	6th
2018	GT4 European Series – Silver	3Y Technology	12	0	0	0	0	27	18th
2018	GT4 Belgium Cup – Silver	3Y Technology	6	0	0	0	0		
2018	Alpine Elf Europa Cup	Racing Technology	2	2	0	1	2	0	NC
2019	French GT4 Cup – Pro-Am	CMR	12	4	1	0	4	116	**2nd**
2019	TCR Europe Touring Car Series	Boutsen Ginion Racing	2	0	0	0	0	18	27th
2019	GT4 European Series – Silver	Selleslagh Racing Team	2	0	0	0	0	11	21st
2019	GT4 European Series – Silver	CMR	2	0	0	0	0	11	21st
2019	Blancpain GT Series Endurance Cup – Invitational	1969 Tribute	1	0	0	0	0	0	NC
2019	Hankook 25 Hours VW Fun Cup		1	0	0	0	0	—N/a	4th
2019	Classic Endurance Racing – GT1		1	0	0	0	0	9.5	44th
2019	Mazda MX-5 Cup Netherlands	Mazda Motor Belgie - MSTC	4	1	0	0	1	21	18th
2020	GT4 European Series – Silver	CMR	12	2	2	3	5	158	**3rd**
2020	GT World Challenge Europe Endurance Cup – Am	CMR	1	1	0	0	1	44	5th
2020	Intercontinental GT Challenge	CMR	1	0	0	0	0	0	NC
2021	24H GT Series – GT4	PROsport Performance AMR	1	0	0	0	1	22	NC
2021	GT4 European Series – Silver	TGR CMR	12	2	0	0	7	159	**2nd**
2021	French GT4 Cup – Silver	CMR	6	1	0	0	3	79	7th
2021	French GT4 Cup – Pro-Am	CMR	4	0	0	0	2	0	NC
2022	GT World Challenge Europe Endurance Cup – Pro-Am	CMR	1	0	0	0	0	0	NC
2022	GT World Challenge Europe Endurance Cup – Gold	CMR	1	0	0	0	0	0	NC
2022	French GT4 Cup – Silver	CMR	10	1	0	1	5	94	4th
2022	GT4 European Series – Silver	Selleslagh Racing Team	2	0	0	0	0	0	NC
2022	Le Mans Classic – Plateau 6		3	0	0	0	0		18th
2023	French GT4 Cup – Silver	CMR	12	0	0	0	2	94	6th
2023	GT4 European Series – Silver	TGR Team CMR	2	0	0	0	0	1	38th
2023	Gulf 12 Hours – GT3 Am	AF Corse	1	0	0	0	0	—N/a	4th
2024	French GT4 Cup – Am	Team CMR	12	3	4	6	9	193	**2nd**
2024	GT4 European Series – Pro-Am	Team CMR	2	0	0	0	1	18	17th
2024	Lamborghini Super Trofeo Europe – Am	Team CMR	10	0	0	0	1	44	9th
2024	Lamborghini Super Trofeo World Finals – Am	Team CMR	2	0	0	0	0	11	4th
2024–25	Asian Le Mans Series – LMP3	Ultimate	2	2	2	0	2	52	9th
2025	6h de Barcelona – Cup 4	CMR	1	1	0	0	1	—N/a	**1st**
2025	French GT4 Cup – Am	CMR	10	6	5	8	8	213	**1st**
2025	Lamborghini Super Trofeo Europe – Am	CMR	10	1	4	1	2	73	5th
2025	Lamborghini Super Trofeo World Finals – Am	CMR	2	0	1	0	0	6	9th
2025	GT Endurance Cup – UCS2	CMR	1	0	0	0	0	0	NC
2025	Le Mans Cup – LMP3 Pro-Am	CD Sport	2	0	0	0	0	0	35th
2025	GT World Challenge Europe Endurance Cup – Pro-Am	AF Corse	1	0	0	0	0	0	NC
2025	Intercontinental GT Challenge	AF Corse	1	0	0	0	0	0	NC
2026	French GT4 Cup – Am	CMR							
2026	Lamborghini Super Trofeo Europe – Am	CMR	11	2	4	8	7	108	**2nd**
2026	Lamborghini Super Trofeo World Finals – Am	CMR	2	0	0	0	0	7	9th
2026	Le Mans Cup – GT3	Code Racing Development	1	0	1	0	0	13	17th

=== Complete 24 Hours of Spa results ===
Year	Team	Co-Drivers	Car	Class	Laps	Pos.	Class Pos.
1996	(Belgium) Mühlner Motorsport	(Netherlands) D. Braakhekke (Portugal) J. Ribeiro	Opel Astra	Spa 2.0	433	20th	**2nd**
1997	(Belgium) Colsoul Racing	(Belgium) Frédéric Bouvy (Germany) Wolfgang Haug	Mitsubishi Lancer	SP	200	DNF	DNF
1998	(Belgium) Mühlner Motorsport	(Belgium) Martial Chouvel (Belgium) Eddy Van der Pluym	Opel Astra	SP	428	23rd	18th
1999	Team Renault Sport Belgium	(Belgium) Peter Baert (Belgium) Stéphane Tollenaire	Renault Mégane	SP	97	DNF	DNF
2000	(United Kingdom) RJN Motorsport	(United Kingdom) Chris Buncombe (Norway) Tommy Rustad	Nissan Primera	SP	?	DNF	DNF
2002	(Belgium) Ice Pol Racing Team	(Belgium) René Franchi (Belgium) Amaury Heurckmans (Belgium) Mark Delobe	Porsche 911 GT3-RS	GTN	360	18th	4th
2003	Racing Team Belgium	(Belgium) Sébastien Ugeux (Belgium) Renaud Kuppens	Gillet Vertigo Streiff	G2	360	26th	7th
2004	(Netherlands) Zwaans GTR Racing Team	(Belgium) Marc Duez (Belgium) Fanny Duchâteau (Belgium) Loïc Deman	Chrysler Viper GTS-R	GT	365	DNF	DNF
2005	(Italy) GPC Sport	(Belgium) Loïc Deman (France) Jean-Philippe Belloc (Italy) Stefano Livio	Ferrari 575-GTC Maranello	GT1	492	15th	9th
2006	(Germany) Phoenix Racing	(Italy) Andrea Piccini (Switzerland) Jean-Denis Délétraz (Switzerland) Marcel Fässler	Aston Martin DBR9	GT1	589	**2nd**	**2nd**
2007	(Germany) Vitaphone Racing Team	(Portugal) Miguel Ramos (San Marino) Christian Montanari (Italy) Matteo Bobbi	Maserati MC12 GT1	GT1	529	4th	4th
2008	(Germany) Vitaphone Racing Team	(Portugal) Miguel Ramos (Brazil) Alexandre Negrão (Italy) Alessandro Pier Guidi	Maserati MC12 GT1	GT1	575	**2nd**	**2nd**
2009	(Germany) Vitaphone Racing Team DHL	(Belgium) Vincent Vosse (Italy) Alessandro Pier Guidi (Sweden) Carl Rosenblad	Maserati MC12 GT1	GT1	548	**2nd**	**2nd**
2010	(Belgium) WRT Belgian Audi Club	(Monaco) Stéphane Ortelli (Belgium) François Verbist (Belgium) Kurt Mollekens	Audi R8 LMS	GT3	497	13th	5th
2011	(Germany) Black Falcon	(Germany) Kenneth Heyer (Germany) Thomas Jäger	Mercedes-Benz SLS AMG GT3	GT3 Pro	535	**3rd**	**3rd**
2012	(Netherlands) DB Motorsport	(Netherlands) Jeffrey van Hooydonk (Netherlands) Jeroen den Boer	BMW Z4 GT3	GT3 Pro	271	DNF	DNF
2013	(France) Sport Garage	(Italy) Leonardo Gorini (France) Thierry Prignaud (France) Romain Brandela	Ferrari 458 Italia GT3	Gentleman	537	18th	5th
2014	(Belgium) Delahaye Racing	(France) Pierre-Etienne Bordet (France) Alexandre Viron (United Arab Emirates) Karim Al Azhari	Porsche 997 GT3-R	Gentleman	490	33rd	7th
2015	(Italy) AF Corse	(Italy) Alessandro Pier Guidi (Thailand) Pasin Lathouras (Italy) Gianmaria Bruni	Ferrari 458 Italia GT3	Pro-Am	531	4th	**1st**
2016	(Italy) Kaspersky Motorsport	(Portugal) Rui Águas (Russia) Alexander Moiseev (Italy) Davide Rizzo	Ferrari 458 Italia GT3	Am	254	DNF	DNF
2019	(Belgium) 1969 Tribute	(Belgium) Loïc Deman (Belgium) Angélique Detavernier (Belgium) Marc Duez	Porsche 911 GT3 Cup MR	Invitational	94	DNF	DNF
2020	(France) CMR	(France) Clément Mateu (France) Romano Ricci (France) Stéphane Tribaudini	Bentley Continental GT3	Am	497	30th	**1st**
2022	(France) CMR	(Belgium) Nigel Bailly (Switzerland) Antonin Borga (Belgium) Maxime Soulet	Bentley Continental GT3	Gold	187	DNF	DNF
2025	(Italy) AF Corse	(Spain) Miguel Molina (Argentina) Luis Pérez Companc (Argentina) Matías Pérez Companc	Ferrari 296 GT3	Pro-Am	537	38th	4th

=== Complete FIA GT Championship results ===
(key) (Races in bold indicate pole position) (Races in italics indicate fastest lap)

Year	Team	Car	Class	1	2	3	4	5	6	7	8	9	10	11	12	13	Pos.	Pts
2004	Zwaans GTR Racing Team	Chrysler Viper GTS-R	GT	MNZ	VAL	MAG	HOC	BRN; 9	DON; 13	SPA; 6H; 5	SPA; 12H; 3	SPA; 24H; Ret	IMO; 15	OSC; WD	DUB	ZHU; 12	34th	5
2005	GPC Sport	Ferrari 360 Modena N-GT	GT2	MNZ	MAG	SIL	IMO	BRN; Ret					IST; 7	ZHU			27th	2
2005	GPC Sport	Ferrari 575 GTC Evo 2005	GT1						SPA; 6H; 9	SPA; 12H; 8	SPA; 24H; 7	OSC			DUB; 6	BHR	27th	4.5
2006	Phoenix Racing	Aston Martin DBR9	GT1	SIL	BRN	OSC	SPA; 6H; 1	SPA; 12H; 1	SPA; 24H; 2	LEC	DIJ	MUG	HUN	ADR	DUB		14th	18
2007	Vitaphone Racing Team	Maserati MC12 GT1	GT1	ZHU	SIL	BUC	MNZ	OSC	SPA; 6H; 6	SPA; 12H; 4	SPA; 24H; 4	ADR	BRN	NOG	ZOL		19th	9
2008	Vitaphone Racing Team	Maserati MC12 GT1	GT1	SIL	MNZ	ADR	OSC	SPA; 6H; 2	SPA; 12H; 2	SPA; 24H; 2	BUC; 1	BUC; 2	BRN	NOG	ZOL	SAN	13th	16
2009	Full Speed Racing	Saleen S7-R	GT1	SIL; 9	ADR; 6	OSC; 8				BUD; Ret	ALG; 8	LEC					10th	13
2009	Vitaphone Racing Team DHL	Maserati MC12 GT1	GT1				SPA; 6H ?	SPA; 12H ?	SPA; 24H; 2								10th	13
2009	BMS Scuderia Italia	Ferrari F430 GTC	GT2										ZOL; Ret				NC	0

=== Complete European Le Mans Series results ===
(key) (Races in bold indicate pole position; results in italics indicate fastest lap)

Year	Entrant	Class	Chassis	Engine	1	2	3	4	5	6	Rank	Points
2005	Graham Nash Motorsport	GT1	Saleen S7-R	Ford Windsor 7.0 L V8	SPA; Ret	MNZ	SIL	NÜR	IST		NC	0
2006	G-Force Racing	LMP2	Courage C65	Judd XV675 3.4L V8	IST	SPA; Ret	NUR	DON	JAR		NC	0
2007	Ice Pol Racing Team	GT2	Ferrari F430GT	Ferrari 4.0L V8	MNZ	VAL	NUR; 7	SPA; 6	SIL	MIL	22nd	5
2008	James Watt Automotive	GT2	Aston Martin V8 Vantage GT2	Aston Martin AM05 4.5 L V8	CAT; DNS	MNZ	SPA	NUR	SIL		NC	0
2009	Larbre Compétition	GT1	Saleen S7-R	Ford Windsor 7.0 L V8	CAT	SPA	ALG; 2	NUR	SIL		11th	8
2010	Atlas FX-Team FS	GT1	Saleen S7-R	Ford Windsor 7.0 L V8	LEC	SPA	ALG	HUN; Ret	SIL		NC	0
2011	AF Corse	LMGTE Am	Ferrari F430 GT2	Ferrari 4.0 L V8	LEC; 2	SPA; 2	IMO; 3	SIL; 5	EST; 4		2nd	58

=== Complete 24 Hours of Nürburgring results ===
Year	Team	Co-Drivers	Car	Class	Laps	Pos.	Class Pos.
2007		(Germany) Oliver Mathai (United Kingdom) Richard Meaden (Germany) Ulrich Schödel	Aston Martin V8 Vantage N24	SP8	84	93rd	7th

=== Complete FIA GT3 European Championship results ===
(key) (Races in bold indicate pole position; races in italics indicate fastest lap)

Year	Entrant	Chassis	Engine	1	2	3	4	5	6	7	8	9	10	11	12	Pos.	Points
2008	Gravity Racing International	Ascari KZ1R	BMW S62 4.9 L V8	SIL; 1 Ret	SIL; 2; 10											8th	22
2008	Prospeed Competition	Porsche 997 GT3 Cup	Porsche M97/75 3.6 L Flat-6			MNZ; 1 Ret	MNZ; 2 Ret	OSC; 1 Ret	OSC; 2 DNS	BRN; 1 Ret	BRN; 2 Ret	NOG; 1; 7	NOG; 2; 13	DUB; 1; 10	DUB; 2 DNS	8th	22
2010	Saintéloc Phoenix Racing	Audi R8 LMS	Audi 5.2 L V10	SIL; 1; 8	SIL; 2; 8	BRN; 1; 10	BRN; 2; 11	JAR; 1 DNS	JAR; 2; 3	LEC; 1	LEC; 2	ALG; 1	ALG; 2			20th	24
2010	Team Rosberg	Audi R8 LMS	Audi 5.2 L V10											ZOL; 1; 14	ZOL; 2 DSQ	20th	24
2011	Fischer Racing	Ford GT GT3	Ford Cammer 5.0 L V8	ALG; 1	ALG; 2	SIL; 1; 23	SIL; 2 DSQ	NAV; 1	NAV; 2	LEC; 1	LEC; 2	SLO; 1	SLO; 2	ZAN; 1	ZAN; 2	60th	0

=== Complete Asian Le Mans Series results ===
(key) (Races in bold indicate pole position) (Races in italics indicate fastest lap)

Year	Team	Class	Car	Engine	1	2	3	4	5	6	Pos.	Points
2009	Larbre Compétition	GT	Saleen S7-R	Ford 7.0 L V8	OKA; 1 Ret	OKA; 2; 3					3rd	14
2016–17	DH Racing	GT	Ferrari 488 GT3	Ferrari F154CB 3.9 L V8	ZHU	FUJ; 1	BUR; 3	SEP; 5			4th	50
2024–25	Ultimate	LMP3	Ligier JS P320	Nissan VK56DE 5.6L V8	**SEP**; **1**; 1	**SEP**; **2**; 1	DUB; 1	DUB; 2	ABU; 1	ABU; 2	9th	52

=== Complete GT World Challenge Europe results ===
==== GT World Challenge Europe Endurance Cup ====
Year	Team	Car	Class	1	2	3	4	5	6	7	8	Pos.	Points
2011	Black Falcon	Mercedes-Benz SLS AMG GT3	GT3 Pro	MNZ	NAV	SPA; 6H ?	SPA; 12H ?	SPA; 24H; 3	MAG	SIL		19th	19.5
2012	DB Motorsport	BMW Z4 GT3	Pro	MNZ; 19	SIL; 5	LEC; Ret	SPA; 6H ?	SPA; 12H ?	SPA; 24H; Ret	NÜR	NAV	17th	21
2013	Saintéloc Racing	Audi R8 LMS Ultra	Gentlemen	MNZ	SIL	LEC; 47						11th	37
2013	Sport Garage	Ferrari 458 Italia GT3	Gentlemen				SPA; 6H ?	SPA; 12H ?	SPA; 24H; 18	NÜR		11th	37
2014	Sport Garage	Ferrari 458 Italia GT3	Pro-Am	MNZ; 18	SIL; 26	LEC; 14						20th	14
2014	Delahaye Racing	Porsche 997 GT3 R	Am				SPA; 6H; 37	SPA; 12H; 30	SPA; 24H; 33	NÜR		24th	17
2015	AF Corse	Ferrari 458 GT3	Pro-Am	MNZ	SIL	LEC	SPA; 6H; 11	SPA; 12H; 6	SPA; 24H; 4	NÜR		6th	46
2016	AF Corse	Ferrari 458 GT3	Am	MNZ	SIL	LEC; Ret				NÜR; 39		15th	27
2016	Kaspersky Motorsport	Ferrari 458 GT3	Am				SPA; 6H; 40	SPA; 12H; 48	SPA; 24H; Ret			15th	27
2019	1969 Tribute	Porsche 911 GT3 Cup MR	Invitational	MNZ	SIL	LEC	SPA; 6H; 66	SPA; 12H; 65	SPA; 24H; Ret	CAT		NC	0
2020	CMR	Bentley Continental GT3	Am	IMO	NÜR	SPA; 6H; 46	SPA; 12H; 38	SPA; 24H; 30	LEC			5th	44
2022	CMR	Bentley Continental GT3	Pro-Am	IMO; Ret	LEC; WD							NC	0
2022	CMR	Bentley Continental GT3	Gold			SPA; 6H; 58	SPA; 12H; Ret	SPA; 24H; Ret	HOC	CAT		NC	0
2025	AF Corse	Ferrari 296 GT3	Pro-Am	LEC	MNZ	SPA; 6H; 55	SPA; 12H; 53	SPA; 24H; 38	NÜR	CAT		NC	0

==== GT World Challenge Europe Sprint Cup ====
(key) (Races in bold indicate pole position) (Races in italics indicate fastest lap)

Year	Team	Car	Class	1	2	3	4	5	6	7	8	9	10	Pos.	Points
2016	AF Corse	Ferrari 458 Italia GT3	Am	**MIS**; **QR**; 30	MIS; CR; 30	**BRH**; **QR**; 36	BRH; CR; 29	**NÜR**; **QR**; 29	**NÜR**; **CR**; 28	HUN; QR	HUN; CR	**CAT**; **QR**; 28	CAT; CR; 29	2nd	134

=== Complete 24 Hours of Le Mans results ===
Year	Team	Co-Drivers	Car	Class	Laps	Pos.	Class Pos.
2017	(Germany) Proton Competition	(Austria) Klaus Bachler (United Arab Emirates) Khaled Al Qubaisi	Porsche 911 RSR	LMGTE Am	46	DNF	DNF

=== Complete GT4 European Series results ===
(key) (Races in bold indicate pole position) (Races in italics indicate fastest lap)

Year	Team	Car	Class	1	2	3	4	5	6	7	8	9	10	11	12	Pos	Points
2018	3Y Technology	BMW M4 GT4	Silver	ZOL; 1 Ret	ZOL; 2; 14	BRH; 1; 4	BRH; 2; 13	MIS; 1; 36	MIS; 2; 13	SPA; 1; 17	SPA; 2; 34	HUN; 1; 33	HUN; 2; 20	NÜR; 1; 7	NÜR; 2; 11	18th	27
2019	Selleslagh Racing Team	Mercedes-AMG GT4	Silver	MNZ; 1	MNZ; 2	BRH; 1	BRH; 2	LEC; 1; 9	LEC; 2; 13							21st	11
2019	CMR	Alpine A110 GT4	Silver							MIS; 1; 10	MIS; 2; 28	ZAN; 1	ZAN; 2	NÜR; 1	NÜR; 2	21st	11
2020	CMR	Toyota GR Supra GT4	Silver	IMO; 1; 14	IMO; 2; 2	MIS; 1; 14	MIS; 2; 13	NÜR; 1; 2	NÜR; 2; 3	ZAN; 1; 6	ZAN; 2; 2	SPA; 1; 15	SPA; 2; 1	LEC; 1; 6	LEC; 2 Ret	3rd	158
2021	TGR CMR	Toyota GR Supra GT4	Silver	MNZ; 1; 2	MNZ; 2; 2	LEC; 1; 2	LEC; 2; 1	ZAN; 1; 5	ZAN; 2; 5	SPA; 1; 4	SPA; 2; 3	NÜR; 1 Ret	NÜR; 2 Ret	CAT; 1; 2	CAT; 2; 13	2nd	159
2022	Selleslagh Racing Team	Mercedes-AMG GT4	Silver	IMO; 1	IMO; 2	LEC; 1	LEC; 2	MIS; 1	MIS; 2	SPA; 1	SPA; 2	HOC; 1	HOC; 2	CAT; 1; 29	CAT; 2; 23	NC	0
2023	TGR Team CMR	Toyota GR Supra GT4	Silver	MNZ; 1	MNZ; 2	LEC; 1	LEC; 2	SPA; 1; 24	SPA; 2; 11	MIS; 1	MIS; 2	HOC; 1	HOC; 2	CAT; 1	CAT; 2	38th	1
2024	Team CMR	Ginetta G56 GT4 Evo	Pro-Am	LEC; 1	LEC; 2	MIS; 1	MIS; 2	SPA; 1; 12	SPA; 2; 32	HOC; 1	HOC; 2	MNZ; 1	MNZ; 2	JED; 1	JED; 2	17th	18
