= 2005 Spa 24 Hours =

2005 Proximus Spa 24 Hours

Seasons
- ← 2004 2006 →

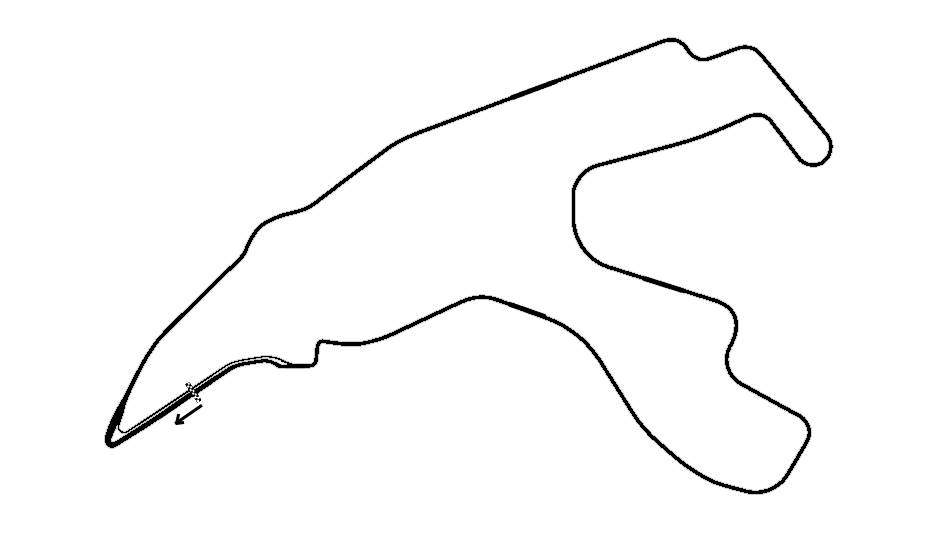
Layout of the Circuit de Spa-Francorchamps (2004-2006)

The 2005 Proximus 24 Hours of Spa was the 58th running of the Spa 24 Hours and the sixth race for the 2005 FIA GT Championship season. It featured the combination of the FIA GT's two classes (GT1 and GT2) with cars from national and one-make series, designated G2 and G3. It took place on 30 and 31 July 2005 at Circuit de Spa-Francorchamps, Belgium.

== Half-point leaders ==
For the FIA GT Championship, the top eight cars in the GT1 and GT2 classes are awarded half points for their positions after six hours and twelve hours into the race. Points to the top eight were awarded in the order of 4.0 – 3.0 – 2.5 – 2.0 – 1.5 – 1.0 – 0.5.

Note that the factory Aston Martin Racing squads and the GLPK-Carsport team are listed in these results for the place in which they were running at the time. They were however unable to score points and thus are skipped.

=== 6 Hour leaders in GT1 ===
Pos	No	Team	Laps
1	9	(Germany) Vitaphone Racing	145
2	10	(Germany) Vitaphone Racing	145
–	28	(United Kingdom) Aston Martin Racing	144
–	6	(Belgium) GLPK-Carsport	143
–	29	(United Kingdom) Aston Martin Racing	143
3	15	(Monaco) JMB Racing	143
4	22	(Belgium) Renstal Excelsior	140
5	11	(France) Larbre Compétition	140
6	12	(France) Larbre Compétition	139
7	16	(Monaco) JMB Racing	138
8	8	(United Kingdom) Graham Nash Motorsport	138

=== 6 Hour leaders in GT2 ===
Pos	No	Team	Laps
1	66	(United Kingdom) GruppeM Racing	139
2	67	(Italy) Autorlando Sport	134
3	55	(United Kingdom) Embassy Racing	128
4	56	(Czech Republic) Czech National Team	121
5	69	(Germany) Proton Competition	116

=== 12 Hour leaders in GT1 ===
Pos	No	Team	Laps
1	9	(Germany) Vitaphone Racing	292
2	10	(Germany) Vitaphone Racing	292
3	15	(Monaco) JMB Racing	290
–	28	(United Kingdom) Aston Martin Racing	286
4	11	(France) Larbre Compétition	284
5	12	(France) Larbre Compétition	282
6	22	(Belgium) Renstal Excelsior	281
7	8	(United Kingdom) Graham Nash Motorsport	278
–	6	(Belgium) GLPK-Carsport	275
–	29	(United Kingdom) Aston Martin Racing	274
8	3	(Italy) GPC Sport	242

=== 12 Hour leaders in GT2 ===
Pos	No	Team	Laps
1	66	(United Kingdom) GruppeM	272
2	67	(Italy) Autorlando Sport	272
3	69	(Germany) Proton Competition	239
4	55	(United Kingdom) Embassy Racing	239
5	56	(Czech Republic) Czech National Team	212

== Official results ==
Class winners in bold. Cars failing to complete 70% of winner's distance marked as Not Classified (NC).

Pos	Class	No	Team	Drivers	Chassis	Tyre	Laps
Pos	Class	No	Team	Drivers	Engine	Tyre	Laps
1	**GT1**	**9**	**(Germany) Vitaphone Racing**	**(Belgium) Eric van de Poele (Germany) Michael Bartels (Germany) Timo Scheider**	**Maserati MC12 GT1**	P	**576**
1	**GT1**	**9**	**(Germany) Vitaphone Racing**	**(Belgium) Eric van de Poele (Germany) Michael Bartels (Germany) Timo Scheider**	**Maserati 6.0L V12**	P	**576**
2	GT1	15	(Monaco) JMB Racing	(Italy) Andrea Bertolini (Austria) Karl Wendlinger (Austria) Philipp Peter	Maserati MC12 GT1	P	574
2	GT1	15	(Monaco) JMB Racing	(Italy) Andrea Bertolini (Austria) Karl Wendlinger (Austria) Philipp Peter	Maserati 6.0L V12	P	574
3	GT1	11	(France) Larbre Compétition	(Belgium) Vincent Vosse (Belgium) Kurt Mollekens (France) Christophe Bouchut (Switzerland) Gabriele Gardel	Ferrari 550-GTS Maranello	M	567
3	GT1	11	(France) Larbre Compétition	(Belgium) Vincent Vosse (Belgium) Kurt Mollekens (France) Christophe Bouchut (Switzerland) Gabriele Gardel	Ferrari 5.9 V12	M	567
4	GT1	12	(France) Larbre Compétition	(Switzerland) Lilian Bryner (Switzerland) Enzo Calderari (Switzerland) Steve Zacchia (Belgium) Frédéric Bouvy	Ferrari 550-GTS Maranello	M	562
4	GT1	12	(France) Larbre Compétition	(Switzerland) Lilian Bryner (Switzerland) Enzo Calderari (Switzerland) Steve Zacchia (Belgium) Frédéric Bouvy	Ferrari 5.9 V12	M	562
5	GT1	29	(United Kingdom) Aston Martin Racing^{†}	(Belgium) Marc Goossens (Netherlands) Peter Kox (Portugal) Pedro Lamy	Aston Martin DBR9	M	557
5	GT1	29	(United Kingdom) Aston Martin Racing^{†}	(Belgium) Marc Goossens (Netherlands) Peter Kox (Portugal) Pedro Lamy	Aston Martin 6.0L V12	M	557
6	GT1	28	(United Kingdom) Aston Martin Racing^{†}	(Australia) David Brabham (United Kingdom) Darren Turner (France) Stéphane Sarrazin	Aston Martin DBR9	M	555
6	GT1	28	(United Kingdom) Aston Martin Racing^{†}	(Australia) David Brabham (United Kingdom) Darren Turner (France) Stéphane Sarrazin	Aston Martin 6.0L V12	M	555
7	**GT2**	**66**	**(United Kingdom) GruppeM Racing**	**(Germany) Marc Lieb (Germany) Mike Rockenfeller (Germany) Lucas Luhr**	**Porsche 911 GT3-RSR**	M	**541**
7	**GT2**	**66**	**(United Kingdom) GruppeM Racing**	**(Germany) Marc Lieb (Germany) Mike Rockenfeller (Germany) Lucas Luhr**	**Porsche 3.6L Flat-6**	M	**541**
8	GT1	22	(Belgium) Renstal Excelsior	(Belgium) Marc Duez (Netherlands) Jos Menten (France) Bruno Hernandez (France) Eric Cayrolle	Chevrolet Corvette C5-R	M	536
8	GT1	22	(Belgium) Renstal Excelsior	(Belgium) Marc Duez (Netherlands) Jos Menten (France) Bruno Hernandez (France) Eric Cayrolle	Chevrolet LS7r 7.0L V8	M	536
9	GT2	67	(Italy) Autorlando Sport	(Italy) Luigi Moccia (Italy) Franco Groppi (Switzerland) Joël Camathias	Porsche 911 GT3-RSR	P	535
9	GT2	67	(Italy) Autorlando Sport	(Italy) Luigi Moccia (Italy) Franco Groppi (Switzerland) Joël Camathias	Porsche 3.6L Flat-6	P	535
10	GT1	8	(United Kingdom) Graham Nash Motorsport	(United Kingdom) Mike Newton (Brazil) Thomas Erdos (United Kingdom) Michael Mallock (United Kingdom) Phil Bennett	Saleen S7-R	P	529
10	GT1	8	(United Kingdom) Graham Nash Motorsport	(United Kingdom) Mike Newton (Brazil) Thomas Erdos (United Kingdom) Michael Mallock (United Kingdom) Phil Bennett	Ford 7.0L V8	P	529
11	**G2**	**191**	**(Belgium) Renstal de Bokkenrijders (Belgium) TT Racing**	**(Belgium) Rudi Penders (Belgium) Franz Lamot (Belgium) Bart Couwberghs**	**Porsche 911 GT3-RS**	M	**529**
11	**G2**	**191**	**(Belgium) Renstal de Bokkenrijders (Belgium) TT Racing**	**(Belgium) Rudi Penders (Belgium) Franz Lamot (Belgium) Bart Couwberghs**	**Porsche 3.6L Flat-6**	M	**529**
12	G2	121	(France) Force One Racing	(France) Richard Virenque (Switzerland) François Labhardt (Monaco) Philippe Prette (Belgium) Didier de Radiguès	Dodge Viper GTS-R	P	509
12	G2	121	(France) Force One Racing	(France) Richard Virenque (Switzerland) François Labhardt (Monaco) Philippe Prette (Belgium) Didier de Radiguès	Dodge 8.0L V10	P	509
13	G2	190	(Belgium) GPR Racing	(Belgium) Nicolas de Gastines (Belgium) Tom Cloet (Belgium) Bert van Rossem (Belgium) Danny De Laet	Porsche 911 GT3-RS	D	497
13	G2	190	(Belgium) GPR Racing	(Belgium) Nicolas de Gastines (Belgium) Tom Cloet (Belgium) Bert van Rossem (Belgium) Danny De Laet	Porsche 3.6L Flat-6	D	497
14	**G3**	**124**	**(Belgium) Mühlner Motorsport**	**(Belgium) Chris Mattheus (Belgium) Steve Van Bellingen (Belgium) Armand Fumal (Belgium) Christophe Geoffroy**	**Porsche 911 GT3 Cup**	M	**495**
14	**G3**	**124**	**(Belgium) Mühlner Motorsport**	**(Belgium) Chris Mattheus (Belgium) Steve Van Bellingen (Belgium) Armand Fumal (Belgium) Christophe Geoffroy**	**Porsche 3.6L Flat-6**	M	**495**
15	GT1	3	(Italy) GPC Sport	(Belgium) Stéphane Lémeret (Belgium) Loïc Deman (France) Jean-Philippe Belloc (Italy) Stefano Livio	Ferrari 575-GTC Maranello	P	492
15	GT1	3	(Italy) GPC Sport	(Belgium) Stéphane Lémeret (Belgium) Loïc Deman (France) Jean-Philippe Belloc (Italy) Stefano Livio	Ferrari 6.0 V12	P	492
16	GT2	69	(Germany) Proton Competition	(Germany) Christian Ried (Germany) Gerold Ried (Austria) Horst Felbermayr (Austria) Horst Felbermayr Jr.	Porsche 911 GT3-RS	D	489
16	GT2	69	(Germany) Proton Competition	(Germany) Christian Ried (Germany) Gerold Ried (Austria) Horst Felbermayr (Austria) Horst Felbermayr Jr.	Porsche 3.6L Flat-6	D	489
17	G2	170	(Belgium) Ice Pol Racing Team	(Belgium) Yves Lambert (Belgium) Christian Lefort (Finland) Markus Palttala (Belgium) Jean André	Porsche 911 GT3-RS	D	486
17	G2	170	(Belgium) Ice Pol Racing Team	(Belgium) Yves Lambert (Belgium) Christian Lefort (Finland) Markus Palttala (Belgium) Jean André	Porsche 3.6L Flat-6	D	486
18	G2	108	(Italy) Autorlando Sport	(Switzerland) Daniel Model (Italy) Giampaolo Tenchini (Italy) Salvatore Riolo (Italy) Dario Cerati	Porsche 911 GT3-RSR	P	477
18	G2	108	(Italy) Autorlando Sport	(Switzerland) Daniel Model (Italy) Giampaolo Tenchini (Italy) Salvatore Riolo (Italy) Dario Cerati	Porsche 3.6L Flat-6	P	477
19	GT2	88	(United Kingdom) GruppeM Racing	(France) Emmanuel Collard (United Kingdom) Tim Sugden (France) Stéphane Ortelli	Porsche 911 GT3-RSR	M	477
19	GT2	88	(United Kingdom) GruppeM Racing	(France) Emmanuel Collard (United Kingdom) Tim Sugden (France) Stéphane Ortelli	Porsche 3.6L Flat-6	M	477
20	GT2	55	(United Kingdom) Embassy Racing	(United Kingdom) Ben Collins (New Zealand) Neil Cunningham (Germany) Sascha Maassen	Porsche 911 GT3-RSR	D	476
20	GT2	55	(United Kingdom) Embassy Racing	(United Kingdom) Ben Collins (New Zealand) Neil Cunningham (Germany) Sascha Maassen	Porsche 3.6L Flat-6	D	476
21	G3	112	(France) Jean-Charles Levy	(France) Philippe Nozière (France) Rémy Brouard (France) Philippe Levy (France) Jean-Charles Levy	Porsche 911 GT3 Cup	P	469
21	G3	112	(France) Jean-Charles Levy	(France) Philippe Nozière (France) Rémy Brouard (France) Philippe Levy (France) Jean-Charles Levy	Porsche 3.6L Flat-6	P	469
22	G2	173	(France) Olivier Baron	(Belgium) André-Alain Corbel (France) Olivier Baron (France) Denis Cohignac (France) Thierry Stépec	Porsche 911 GT3-RS	D	465
22	G2	173	(France) Olivier Baron	(Belgium) André-Alain Corbel (France) Olivier Baron (France) Denis Cohignac (France) Thierry Stépec	Porsche 3.6L Flat-6	D	465
23	G2	111	(Belgium) Signa Racing Team	(Belgium) Patrick Chaillet (Belgium) Laurent Nef (Belgium) Jacques Morlet	Porsche 911 GT3 Cup	D	461
23	G2	111	(Belgium) Signa Racing Team	(Belgium) Patrick Chaillet (Belgium) Laurent Nef (Belgium) Jacques Morlet	Porsche 3.6L Flat-6	D	461
24	G2	107	(Italy) Scuderia Giudici	(Italy) Gianni Giudici (Italy) Diego Romanini (Italy) Raffaele Raimondi	Maserati Gran Sport Light	P	435
24	G2	107	(Italy) Scuderia Giudici	(Italy) Gianni Giudici (Italy) Diego Romanini (Italy) Raffaele Raimondi	Maserati 4.2L V8	P	435
25	GT2	56	(Czech Republic) Czech National Team	(Czech Republic) Jan Vonka (Slovakia) Miro Konopka (Italy) Antonio De Castro	Porsche 911 GT3-RS	D	423
25	GT2	56	(Czech Republic) Czech National Team	(Czech Republic) Jan Vonka (Slovakia) Miro Konopka (Italy) Antonio De Castro	Porsche 3.6L Flat-6	D	423
26 DNF	GT1	10	(Germany) Vitaphone Racing	(Italy) Fabio Babini (Italy) Thomas Biagi (United Kingdom) Jamie Davies	Maserati MC12 GT1	P	401
26 DNF	GT1	10	(Germany) Vitaphone Racing	(Italy) Fabio Babini (Italy) Thomas Biagi (United Kingdom) Jamie Davies	Maserati 6.0L V12	P	401
27 DNF	G2	106	(Belgium) PSI Motorsport	(Belgium) Damien Coens (France) Anthony Beltoise (France) Jean-Luc Blanchemain	Porsche 911 GT3-RS	D	342
27 DNF	G2	106	(Belgium) PSI Motorsport	(Belgium) Damien Coens (France) Anthony Beltoise (France) Jean-Luc Blanchemain	Porsche 3.6L Flat-6	D	342
28 DNF	G2	115	(Belgium) EBRT (Belgium) Renstal de Bokkenrijders	(Belgium) Olivier Muytjens (Belgium) Rafaël Coenen (Belgium) Roger Grouwels	Porsche 911 GT3 Cup	P	218
28 DNF	G2	115	(Belgium) EBRT (Belgium) Renstal de Bokkenrijders	(Belgium) Olivier Muytjens (Belgium) Rafaël Coenen (Belgium) Roger Grouwels	Porsche 3.6L Flat-6	P	218
29 DNF	G3	123	(Belgium) Mühlner Motorsport	(Belgium) Vanina Ickx (Germany) Heinz-Josef Bermes (Belgium) Jean-François Hemroulle (Germany) Helmut Reis	Porsche 911 GT3 Cup	M	198
29 DNF	G3	123	(Belgium) Mühlner Motorsport	(Belgium) Vanina Ickx (Germany) Heinz-Josef Bermes (Belgium) Jean-François Hemroulle (Germany) Helmut Reis	Porsche 3.6L Flat-6	M	198
30 DNF	GT1	16	(Monaco) JMB Racing	(Netherlands) Rob van der Zwaan (Netherlands) Arjan van der Zwaan (Netherlands) Peter Kutemann	Maserati MC12 GT1	P	141
30 DNF	GT1	16	(Monaco) JMB Racing	(Netherlands) Rob van der Zwaan (Netherlands) Arjan van der Zwaan (Netherlands) Peter Kutemann	Maserati 6.0L V12	P	141
31 DNF	GT1	14	(United Kingdom) Lister Storm Racing	(United Kingdom) Justin Keen (United States) Liz Halliday (Denmark) Jens Møller (United Kingdom) Bobby Verdon-Roe	Lister Storm GT	D	134
31 DNF	GT1	14	(United Kingdom) Lister Storm Racing	(United Kingdom) Justin Keen (United States) Liz Halliday (Denmark) Jens Møller (United Kingdom) Bobby Verdon-Roe	Jaguar 7.0 V12	D	134
32 DNF	GT1	17	(Russia) Russian Age Racing	(Russia) Nikolai Fomenko (Russia) Alexey Vasilyev (France) Nicolas Minassian (United Kingdom) Jamie Campbell-Walter	Ferrari 550-GTS Maranello	M	96
32 DNF	GT1	17	(Russia) Russian Age Racing	(Russia) Nikolai Fomenko (Russia) Alexey Vasilyev (France) Nicolas Minassian (United Kingdom) Jamie Campbell-Walter	Ferrari 5.9 V12	M	96
33 DNF	G2	105	(Belgium) Belgian Racing	(Belgium) Bas Leinders (Belgium) Renaud Kuppens (Belgium) Jérôme d'Ambrosio (Belgium) Sylvie Delcour	Gillet Vertigo Streiff	D	84
33 DNF	G2	105	(Belgium) Belgian Racing	(Belgium) Bas Leinders (Belgium) Renaud Kuppens (Belgium) Jérôme d'Ambrosio (Belgium) Sylvie Delcour	Alfa Romeo 3.6L V6	D	84
34 DNF	GT1	2	(Italy) GPC Sport	(Switzerland) Jean-Denis Délétraz (Italy) Andrea Piccini (Brazil) Jaime Melo (Italy) Gianni Morbidelli	Ferrari 575-GTC Maranello	P	29
34 DNF	GT1	2	(Italy) GPC Sport	(Switzerland) Jean-Denis Délétraz (Italy) Andrea Piccini (Brazil) Jaime Melo (Italy) Gianni Morbidelli	Ferrari 6.0 V12	P	29
35 DNF	G2	175	(United Kingdom) Ian Khan	(France) Paul Belmondo (United Kingdom) Ian Khan (Belgium) Charles de Pauw (Belgium) Alain van den Hove	Porsche 911 GT3-RSR	P	2
35 DNF	G2	175	(United Kingdom) Ian Khan	(France) Paul Belmondo (United Kingdom) Ian Khan (Belgium) Charles de Pauw (Belgium) Alain van den Hove	Porsche 3.6L Flat-6	P	2
36 DNF	GT2	74	(Italy) Ebimotors	(Italy) Emanuele Busnelli (Italy) Andrea Sovinco (Switzerland) Yvan Jacoma (Italy) Paolo Rapetti	Porsche 911 GT3-RSR	D	1
36 DNF	GT2	74	(Italy) Ebimotors	(Italy) Emanuele Busnelli (Italy) Andrea Sovinco (Switzerland) Yvan Jacoma (Italy) Paolo Rapetti	Porsche 3.6L Flat-6	D	1
DSQ	GT1	6	(Belgium) GLPK-Carsport	(Belgium) Bert Longin (Belgium) Anthony Kumpen (Netherlands) Mike Hezemans (Netherlands) Jeroen Bleekemolen	Chevrolet Corvette C5-R	M	563
DSQ	GT1	6	(Belgium) GLPK-Carsport	(Belgium) Bert Longin (Belgium) Anthony Kumpen (Netherlands) Mike Hezemans (Netherlands) Jeroen Bleekemolen	Chevrolet LS7r 7.0L V8	M	563

† – These entries are factory teams and thus do not score points for the championship.

== Statistics ==
- Pole Position – #9 Vitaphone Racing Team – 2:14.845
- Fastest Lap – #10 Vitaphone Racing Team – 2:15.598
- Average Speed – 166.63 km/h

FIA GT Championship
Previous race: 2005 FIA GT Brno Supercar 500	2005 season	Next race: 2005 FIA GT Oschersleben Supercar 500
