= Tony Gillet =

Belgian racing driver

Tony Gillet (born 4 September 1945 in Marche, Belgium) is a Belgian former racing driver and founder of the Gillet sports car company.

== Racing career ==
Gillet started racing in 1968 in provincial rallies, at the wheel of a Renault 4. In 1979 and 1980 he won the Belgian hill-climb championship driving a Formula 2 Renault previously driven by Jean-Pierre Jabouille. In the 1980s he built prototype cars for competitions including the Paris-Dakar rally.

== Gillet automobiles ==
Tony Gillet founded Automobiles Gillet in 1991. It released its first car in 1994.
