= 2007 Spa 24 Hours =

2007 Total Spa 24 Hours

Seasons
- ← 2006 2008 →

Layout of the Circuit de Spa-Francorchamps

The 2007 Total Spa 24 Hours was the 60th running of the Spa 24 Hours as well as the sixth race of the 2007 FIA GT Championship season, was sponsored by Total. The G3 class also included cars running in the GT3 specification seen in the FIA GT3 European Championship, although this event was not part of their scheduled season. It took place at Circuit de Spa-Francorchamps, Belgium, on July 28 and 29 2007.

== Report ==
The race was run under varying weather conditions over the 24-hour period, with occasional heavy rain leading to length safety car periods several times. The #33 Jetalliance Aston Martin led the race early on, yet was forced to drop out after 158 laps. The lead was then shared by a group of cars all running on the same lap, including both Vitaphone Racing Maseratis as well as the Scuderia Playteam Maserati, as well as the PK Carsport and Carsport Holland Corvettes.

Nearing the final hour of the race, the #1 Vitaphone Racing Maserati had a lap lead over Carsport Holland, but a mistake on a slippery track led to the car becoming buried in a gravel trap. While the car was being extracted, the Carsport Holland Corvette would take over the lead, remaining there to take the victory. The margin of victory was 1:17.756.

In GT2, the BMS Scuderia Italia Porsche lead for nearly the entire event, eventually earning a four lap margin of victory. In the G2 class, the pair of Mosler MT900s would easily defeat other competitors, with the Belgian G&A Racing team taking the class win. Fellow Belgian team Mühlner Motorsport would take the G3 class victory, with their Porsche 997 GT3 Cup 16 laps ahead of the nearest competitor. In the Coupe du Roi relay, the JMB Racing Ferrari would be the only car to finish the event, earning them the win.

== Half-point Leaders ==
In the FIA GT Championship (using the GT1 and GT2 classes), the top eight teams are awarded half-points for their position both at the six-hour mark as well as at the midway point of the race. Points for the top eight go in the order of 5 – 4 – 3 – 2.5 – 2 – 1.5 – 1 – 0.5.

=== 6 Hour Leaders in GT1 ===
Pos	No	Team	Laps
1	33	(Austria) Jetalliance Racing	148
2	11	(Italy) Scuderia Playteam Sarafree	148
3	5	(Netherlands) Carsport Holland	148
4	3	(France) Luc Alphand Aventures	147
5	1	(Germany) Vitaphone Racing Team	147
6	2	(Germany) Vitaphone Racing Team	147
7	23	(Italy) Aston Martin Racing BMS	147
8	4	(Belgium) PK Carsport	147

=== 6 Hour Leaders in GT2 ===
Pos	No	Team	Laps
1	97	(Italy) BMS Scuderia Italia	142
2	51	(Italy) AF Corse Motorola	141
3	52	(Italy) Racing Team Edil Cris	140
4	76	(France) IMSA Performance Matmut	140
5	74	(Italy) Ebimotors	139
6	99	(United Kingdom) Tech9 Motorsport	139
7	62	(United Kingdom) Scuderia Ecosse	136
8	63	(United Kingdom) Scuderia Ecosse	134

=== 12 Hour Leaders in GT1 ===
Pos	No	Team	Laps
1	5	(Netherlands) Carsport Holland	292
2	1	(Germany) Vitaphone Racing Team	291
3	11	(Italy) Scuderia Playteam Sarafree	291
4	2	(Germany) Vitaphone Racing Team	290
5	4	(Belgium) PK Carsport	290
6	3	(France) Luc Alphand Aventures	289
7	18	(Belgium) Selleslagh Racing Team	284
8	16	(Monaco) JMB Racing	280

=== 12 Hour Leaders in GT2 ===
Pos	No	Team	Laps
1	97	(Italy) BMS Scuderia Italia	280
2	51	(Italy) AF Corse Motorola	278
3	76	(France) IMSA Performance Matmut	277
4	52	(Italy) Racing Team Edil Cris	276
5	99	(United Kingdom) Tech9 Motorsport	274
6	74	(Italy) Ebimotors	274
7	63	(United Kingdom) Scuderia Ecosse	268
8	70	(Italy) Easy Race	260

== Official results ==
Class winners in bold. Cars failing to complete 75% of winner's distance marked as Not Classified (NC).

Pos	Class	No	Team	Drivers	Chassis	Tyre	Laps
Pos	Class	No	Team	Drivers	Engine	Tyre	Laps
1	**GT1**	**5**	**(Netherlands) Carsport Holland (Germany) Phoenix Racing**	**(Netherlands) Mike Hezemans (Switzerland) Jean-Denis Délétraz (Switzerland) Marcel Fässler (Italy) Fabrizio Gollin**	**Chevrolet Corvette C6.R**	M	**532**
1	**GT1**	**5**	**(Netherlands) Carsport Holland (Germany) Phoenix Racing**	**(Netherlands) Mike Hezemans (Switzerland) Jean-Denis Délétraz (Switzerland) Marcel Fässler (Italy) Fabrizio Gollin**	**Chevrolet LS7-R 7.0L V8**	M	**532**
2	GT1	1	(Germany) Vitaphone Racing Team	(Germany) Michael Bartels (Italy) Thomas Biagi (Belgium) Eric van de Poele (Portugal) Pedro Lamy	Maserati MC12 GT1	M	532
2	GT1	1	(Germany) Vitaphone Racing Team	(Germany) Michael Bartels (Italy) Thomas Biagi (Belgium) Eric van de Poele (Portugal) Pedro Lamy	Maserati 6.0L V12	M	532
3	GT1	4	(Belgium) PK Carsport	(Belgium) Anthony Kumpen (Belgium) Bert Longin (Belgium) Kurt Mollekens (Belgium) Frédéric Bouvy	Chevrolet Corvette C5-R	M	529
3	GT1	4	(Belgium) PK Carsport	(Belgium) Anthony Kumpen (Belgium) Bert Longin (Belgium) Kurt Mollekens (Belgium) Frédéric Bouvy	Chevrolet LS7-R 7.0L V8	M	529
4	GT1	2	(Germany) Vitaphone Racing Team	(Portugal) Miguel Ramos (San Marino) Christian Montanari (Italy) Matteo Bobbi (Belgium) Stéphane Lémeret	Maserati MC12 GT1	M	529
4	GT1	2	(Germany) Vitaphone Racing Team	(Portugal) Miguel Ramos (San Marino) Christian Montanari (Italy) Matteo Bobbi (Belgium) Stéphane Lémeret	Maserati 6.0L V12	M	529
5	GT1	11	(Italy) Scuderia Playteam Sarafree	(Italy) Andrea Bertolini (Italy) Andrea Piccini (Italy) Alessandro Pier Guidi (Italy) Fabrizio de Simone	Maserati MC12 GT1	P	527
5	GT1	11	(Italy) Scuderia Playteam Sarafree	(Italy) Andrea Bertolini (Italy) Andrea Piccini (Italy) Alessandro Pier Guidi (Italy) Fabrizio de Simone	Maserati 6.0L V12	P	527
6	GT1	3	(France) Luc Alphand Aventures	(Belgium) Vincent Vosse (Belgium) Gregory Franchi (United Kingdom) Oliver Gavin (Monaco) Olivier Beretta	Chevrolet Corvette C6.R	M	521
6	GT1	3	(France) Luc Alphand Aventures	(Belgium) Vincent Vosse (Belgium) Gregory Franchi (United Kingdom) Oliver Gavin (Monaco) Olivier Beretta	Chevrolet LS7-R 7.0L V8	M	521
7	GT1	16	(Monaco) JMB Racing	(United Kingdom) Joe Macari (United Kingdom) Ben Aucott (United Kingdom) Marino Franchitti (Austria) Philipp Peter	Maserati MC12 GT1	M	515
7	GT1	16	(Monaco) JMB Racing	(United Kingdom) Joe Macari (United Kingdom) Ben Aucott (United Kingdom) Marino Franchitti (Austria) Philipp Peter	Maserati 6.0L V12	M	515
8	**GT2**	**97**	**(Italy) BMS Scuderia Italia**	**(France) Emmanuel Collard (Italy) Matteo Malucelli (Germany) Marc Lieb**	**Porsche 997 GT3-RSR**	P	**511**
8	**GT2**	**97**	**(Italy) BMS Scuderia Italia**	**(France) Emmanuel Collard (Italy) Matteo Malucelli (Germany) Marc Lieb**	**Porsche 3.8L Flat-6**	P	**511**
9	GT2	76	(France) IMSA Performance Matmut	(France) Raymond Narac (United States) Patrick Long (Austria) Richard Lietz	Porsche 997 GT3-RSR	M	507
9	GT2	76	(France) IMSA Performance Matmut	(France) Raymond Narac (United States) Patrick Long (Austria) Richard Lietz	Porsche 3.8L Flat-6	M	507
10	GT1	18	(Belgium) Selleslagh Racing Team	(Belgium) Marc Duez (Belgium) Damien Coens (Belgium) Maxime Soulet (Belgium) Steve Van Bellingen	Chevrolet Corvette C5-R	M	502
10	GT1	18	(Belgium) Selleslagh Racing Team	(Belgium) Marc Duez (Belgium) Damien Coens (Belgium) Maxime Soulet (Belgium) Steve Van Bellingen	Chevrolet LS7-R 7.0L V8	M	502
11	GT2	99	(United Kingdom) Tech9 Motorsport	(Russia) Leo Machitski (United Kingdom) Sean Edwards (Germany) Sascha Maassen	Porsche 997 GT3-RSR	M	501
11	GT2	99	(United Kingdom) Tech9 Motorsport	(Russia) Leo Machitski (United Kingdom) Sean Edwards (Germany) Sascha Maassen	Porsche 3.8L Flat-6	M	501
12	GT2	74	(Italy) Ebimotors	(Italy) Emanuele Busnelli (Italy) Marcello Zani (Italy) Andrea Ceccato (France) Xavier Pompidou	Porsche 997 GT3-RSR	M	495
12	GT2	74	(Italy) Ebimotors	(Italy) Emanuele Busnelli (Italy) Marcello Zani (Italy) Andrea Ceccato (France) Xavier Pompidou	Porsche 3.8L Flat-6	M	495
13	GT2	52	(Italy) Racing Team Edil Cris	(Italy) Paolo Ruberti (France) Damien Pasini (Italy) Matteo Cressoni (Italy) Lorenzo Casè	Ferrari F430 GT2	P	483
13	GT2	52	(Italy) Racing Team Edil Cris	(Italy) Paolo Ruberti (France) Damien Pasini (Italy) Matteo Cressoni (Italy) Lorenzo Casè	Ferrari 4.0L V8	P	483
14	**G3**	**124**	**(Belgium) Mühlner Motorsport**	**(Netherlands) Paul van Splunteren (Netherlands) Simon Frederiks (Netherlands) Pim van Riet (Monaco) Ian Khan**	**Porsche 997 GT3 Cup**	M	**475**
14	**G3**	**124**	**(Belgium) Mühlner Motorsport**	**(Netherlands) Paul van Splunteren (Netherlands) Simon Frederiks (Netherlands) Pim van Riet (Monaco) Ian Khan**	**Porsche 3.6L Flat-6**	M	**475**
15	GT2	63	(United Kingdom) Scuderia Ecosse	(Canada) Chris Niarchos (United Kingdom) Andrew Kirkaldy (United Kingdom) Tim Sugden	Ferrari F430 GT2	P	474
15	GT2	63	(United Kingdom) Scuderia Ecosse	(Canada) Chris Niarchos (United Kingdom) Andrew Kirkaldy (United Kingdom) Tim Sugden	Ferrari 4.0L V8	P	474
16	GT2	70	(Italy) Easy Race	(Italy) Giampaolo Tenchini (Italy) Maurice Basso (Italy) Roberto Plati (United Kingdom) Bo McCormick	Ferrari F430 GT2	P	474
16	GT2	70	(Italy) Easy Race	(Italy) Giampaolo Tenchini (Italy) Maurice Basso (Italy) Roberto Plati (United Kingdom) Bo McCormick	Ferrari 4.0L V8	P	474
17	G3	160	(Belgium) Prospeed Competition	(Belgium) Christian Lefort (Belgium) Christian Kelders (Belgium) Christophe Kerkhove (Belgium) Philippe Greisch	Porsche 997 GT3 Cup	M	459
17	G3	160	(Belgium) Prospeed Competition	(Belgium) Christian Lefort (Belgium) Christian Kelders (Belgium) Christophe Kerkhove (Belgium) Philippe Greisch	Porsche 3.6L Flat-6	M	459
18	GT1	12	(Italy) Scuderia Playteam Sarafree	(Italy) Giambattista Giannoccaro (Italy) Max Busnelli (Germany) Alex Müller (Belgium) Yves Lambert	Maserati MC12 GT1	P	458
18	GT1	12	(Italy) Scuderia Playteam Sarafree	(Italy) Giambattista Giannoccaro (Italy) Max Busnelli (Germany) Alex Müller (Belgium) Yves Lambert	Maserati 6.0L V12	P	458
19	**G2**	**105**	**(Belgium) G&A Racing (Belgium) Renstal de Bokkenrijders**	**(Belgium) Guino Kenis (Belgium) Michael de Keersmaecker (Belgium) Patrick Smets (Belgium) Chris Mattheus**	**Mosler MT900 GT3**	M	**455**
19	**G2**	**105**	**(Belgium) G&A Racing (Belgium) Renstal de Bokkenrijders**	**(Belgium) Guino Kenis (Belgium) Michael de Keersmaecker (Belgium) Patrick Smets (Belgium) Chris Mattheus**	**Chevrolet LS7 7.0L V8**	M	**455**
20	G3	141	(France) Emeraude Racing RMS	(France) Romain Rautureau (France) Patrice Fournet (France) Patrick Herbert (France) Matthieu Lahaye	Porsche 997 GT3 Cup	M	453
20	G3	141	(France) Emeraude Racing RMS	(France) Romain Rautureau (France) Patrice Fournet (France) Patrick Herbert (France) Matthieu Lahaye	Porsche 3.6L Flat-6	M	453
21	GT2	95	(United Kingdom) James Watt Automotive	(United Kingdom) Paul Daniels (United Kingdom) David Cox (Switzerland) Joël Camathias (United Kingdom) Oliver Moorey	Porsche 997 GT3-RSR	P	450
21	GT2	95	(United Kingdom) James Watt Automotive	(United Kingdom) Paul Daniels (United Kingdom) David Cox (Switzerland) Joël Camathias (United Kingdom) Oliver Moorey	Porsche 3.8L Flat-6	P	450
22	G2	103	(Belgium) Gravity International	(Belgium) Vincent Radermecker (Belgium) David Dermont (Belgium) Olivier Muytjens (Belgium) Loris De Sordi	Mosler MT900 GT3	M	448
22	G2	103	(Belgium) Gravity International	(Belgium) Vincent Radermecker (Belgium) David Dermont (Belgium) Olivier Muytjens (Belgium) Loris De Sordi	Chevrolet LS7 7.0L V8	M	448
23	**Coupe du Roi**	**201A**	**(Monaco) JMB Racing**	**(Netherlands) Peter Kutemann (Netherlands) Henk Haane**	**Ferrari F430 GT3**	M	**439**
23	**Coupe du Roi**	**201B**	**(Monaco) JMB Racing**	**(France) Nicolas Comar (France) Philippe Rambeaud**	**Ferrari 4.3L V8**	M	**439**
23	**Coupe du Roi**	**201C**	**(Monaco) JMB Racing**	**(France) Pascal Ballay (France) Damien Chanard**	**Ferrari 4.3L V8**	M	**439**
24	G3	140	(France) Emeraude Racing RMS	(France) Laurent Pasquali (France) Olivier Baron (France) Andrea Lancorpel	Porsche 997 GT3 Cup	M	437
24	G3	140	(France) Emeraude Racing RMS	(France) Laurent Pasquali (France) Olivier Baron (France) Andrea Lancorpel	Porsche 3.6L Flat-6	M	437
25	G3	121	(Germany) GS Motorsport	(Belgium) Philippe Broodcooren (Netherlands) Roger Grouwels (Germany) Kenneth Heyer (United Kingdom) Mark J. Thomas	Dodge Viper Competition Coupe	M	411
25	G3	121	(Germany) GS Motorsport	(Belgium) Philippe Broodcooren (Netherlands) Roger Grouwels (Germany) Kenneth Heyer (United Kingdom) Mark J. Thomas	Dodge 8.3L V10	M	411
26	G3	178	(Germany) G Private Racing	(Austria) Patrick Ortlieb (Austria) Paul Pfefferkorn (Austria) Martin Sagmeister (Switzerland) Philip Zumstein	Porsche 997 GT3 Cup	M	399
26	G3	178	(Germany) G Private Racing	(Austria) Patrick Ortlieb (Austria) Paul Pfefferkorn (Austria) Martin Sagmeister (Switzerland) Philip Zumstein	Porsche 3.6L Flat-6	M	399
27	G3	177	(Germany) G Private Racing	(Austria) Otto Dragun (Finland) Mikael Forsten (Austria) Jörg Peham (Switzerland) Mathias Schmitter	Porsche 997 GT3 Cup	M	382
27	G3	177	(Germany) G Private Racing	(Austria) Otto Dragun (Finland) Mikael Forsten (Austria) Jörg Peham (Switzerland) Mathias Schmitter	Porsche 3.6L Flat-6	M	382
28	G3	174	(France) Sport Garage	(France) Gaël Lesoudier (France) François Jakubowski (France) Gilles Vannelet (Republic of Ireland) Hector Lester	Ferrari F430 GT3	M	381
28	G3	174	(France) Sport Garage	(France) Gaël Lesoudier (France) François Jakubowski (France) Gilles Vannelet (Republic of Ireland) Hector Lester	Ferrari 4.3L V8	M	381
29	GT2	78	(Monaco) JMB Racing	(Belgium) Charles de Pauw (Belgium) Alain van den Hove (Belgium) Didier de Radiguès (France) Paul Belmondo	Ferrari F430 GT2	M	369
29	GT2	78	(Monaco) JMB Racing	(Belgium) Charles de Pauw (Belgium) Alain van den Hove (Belgium) Didier de Radiguès (France) Paul Belmondo	Ferrari 4.0L V8	M	369
30	GT2	51	(Italy) AF Corse Motorola	(Italy) Gianmaria Bruni (Monaco) Stéphane Ortelli (Portugal) Rui Águas	Ferrari F430 GT2	M	365
30	GT2	51	(Italy) AF Corse Motorola	(Italy) Gianmaria Bruni (Monaco) Stéphane Ortelli (Portugal) Rui Águas	Ferrari 4.0L V8	M	365
31	G3	175	(France) Sport Garage	(France) François-Xavier Boucher (Belgium) Michel Keyzer (France) Sébastien Carcone (France) Thierry Stépec	Ferrari F430 GT3	M	354
31	G3	175	(France) Sport Garage	(France) François-Xavier Boucher (Belgium) Michel Keyzer (France) Sébastien Carcone (France) Thierry Stépec	Ferrari 4.3L V8	M	354
32	G2	106	(France) Champion Racing	(France) Philippe Noziere (France) Rémy Brouard (France) Philippe Roussaud (France) Manuel Ferreira	Porsche 911 GT3 Cup	M	348
32	G2	106	(France) Champion Racing	(France) Philippe Noziere (France) Rémy Brouard (France) Philippe Roussaud (France) Manuel Ferreira	Porsche 3.6L Flat-6	M	348
33	G3	118	(United Kingdom) Trackspeed Racing	(United Kingdom) David Ashburn (United Kingdom) Martin Rich (United Kingdom) Johnny Lang (United Kingdom) Luke Hines	Porsche 997 GT3 Cup	M	341
33	G3	118	(United Kingdom) Trackspeed Racing	(United Kingdom) David Ashburn (United Kingdom) Martin Rich (United Kingdom) Johnny Lang (United Kingdom) Luke Hines	Porsche 3.6L Flat-6	M	341
34 DNF	GT1	23	(Italy) Aston Martin Racing BMS	(United Kingdom) Jamie Davies (Italy) Fabio Babini (Italy) Ferdinando Monfardini (Italy) Diego Alessi	Aston Martin DBR9	P	330
34 DNF	GT1	23	(Italy) Aston Martin Racing BMS	(United Kingdom) Jamie Davies (Italy) Fabio Babini (Italy) Ferdinando Monfardini (Italy) Diego Alessi	Aston Martin 6.0L V12	P	330
35 DNF	GT1	28	(Germany) Reiter Lamborghini	(Netherlands) Jos Menten (Netherlands) Peter Kox (Netherlands) Jeroen Bleekemolen	Lamborghini Murcielago R-GT	M	268
35 DNF	GT1	28	(Germany) Reiter Lamborghini	(Netherlands) Jos Menten (Netherlands) Peter Kox (Netherlands) Jeroen Bleekemolen	Lamborghini 6.0L V12	M	268
36 DNF	Coupe du Roi	215A	(Austria) S-Berg Racing	(Czech Republic) Jan Charouz (Czech Republic) Jaromir Jírik	Lamborghini Gallardo GT3	M	232
36 DNF	Coupe du Roi	215B	(Austria) S-Berg Racing	(France) Antoine Leclerc (Russia) Vadim Kuzminykh	Lamborghini 5.0L V10	M	232
36 DNF	Coupe du Roi	215C	(Austria) S-Berg Racing	(Czech Republic) Milan Urban (Czech Republic) Jan Urban	Lamborghini 5.0L V10	M	232
37 DNF	GT1	33	(Austria) Jetalliance Racing	(Austria) Karl Wendlinger (United Kingdom) Ryan Sharp (Austria) Lukas Lichtner-Hoyer (Austria) Robert Lechner	Aston Martin DBR9	M	158
37 DNF	GT1	33	(Austria) Jetalliance Racing	(Austria) Karl Wendlinger (United Kingdom) Ryan Sharp (Austria) Lukas Lichtner-Hoyer (Austria) Robert Lechner	Aston Martin 6.0L V12	M	158
38 DNF	G3	116	(Belgium) Signa Motorsport	(Belgium) Patrick Chaillet (Belgium) Laurent Nef (Luxembourg) Christophe Geoffroy	Dodge Viper Competition Coupe	M	153
38 DNF	G3	116	(Belgium) Signa Motorsport	(Belgium) Patrick Chaillet (Belgium) Laurent Nef (Luxembourg) Christophe Geoffroy	Dodge 8.3L V10	M	153
39 DNF	GT2	62	(United Kingdom) Scuderia Ecosse	(United Kingdom) Tim Mullen (Czech Republic) Jaroslav Janiš (Czech Republic) Tomáš Enge (United Kingdom) Jonny Kane	Ferrari F430 GT2	P	136
39 DNF	GT2	62	(United Kingdom) Scuderia Ecosse	(United Kingdom) Tim Mullen (Czech Republic) Jaroslav Janiš (Czech Republic) Tomáš Enge (United Kingdom) Jonny Kane	Ferrari 4.0L V8	P	136
40 DNF	GT1	7	(Germany) All-Inkl.com Racing	(France) Christophe Bouchut (Germany) Stefan Mücke (Germany) Frank Stippler	Lamborghini Murcielago R-GT	M	83
40 DNF	GT1	7	(Germany) All-Inkl.com Racing	(France) Christophe Bouchut (Germany) Stefan Mücke (Germany) Frank Stippler	Lamborghini 6.0L V12	M	83
41 DNF	G2	101	(Belgium) Belgian Racing	(Belgium) Sarah Bovy (Belgium) Bas Leinders (Belgium) Renaud Kuppens	Gillet Vertigo Streiff	P	64
41 DNF	G2	101	(Belgium) Belgian Racing	(Belgium) Sarah Bovy (Belgium) Bas Leinders (Belgium) Renaud Kuppens	Alfa Romeo 3.6L V6	P	64
42 DNF	G2	107	(Italy) AB Motorsport	(Italy) Antonio de Castro (Italy) Renato Premoli (Italy) Bruno Barbaro	Porsche 911 GT3-RS	D	63
42 DNF	G2	107	(Italy) AB Motorsport	(Italy) Antonio de Castro (Italy) Renato Premoli (Italy) Bruno Barbaro	Porsche 3.6L Flat-6	D	63
43 DNF	GT2	50	(Italy) AF Corse Motorola	(Finland) Toni Vilander (Germany) Dirk Müller (Finland) Mika Salo	Ferrari F430 GT2	M	58
43 DNF	GT2	50	(Italy) AF Corse Motorola	(Finland) Toni Vilander (Germany) Dirk Müller (Finland) Mika Salo	Ferrari 4.0L V8	M	58
44 DNF	GT2	60	(Belgium) Prospeed Competition	(Belgium) Rudi Penders (Belgium) Franz Lamot (Belgium) Bart Couwberghs (Belgium) François Duval	Porsche 997 GT3-RSR	M	57
44 DNF	GT2	60	(Belgium) Prospeed Competition	(Belgium) Rudi Penders (Belgium) Franz Lamot (Belgium) Bart Couwberghs (Belgium) François Duval	Porsche 3.8L Flat-6	M	57
45 DNF	G3	117	(France) Pilotage Passion	(France) Thierry Guiod (France) Jean-Charles Levy (France) Philippe Levy (Belgium) Michel Mitieus	Porsche 997 GT3 Cup	T	45
45 DNF	G3	117	(France) Pilotage Passion	(France) Thierry Guiod (France) Jean-Charles Levy (France) Philippe Levy (Belgium) Michel Mitieus	Porsche 3.6L Flat-6	T	45
46 DNF	GT1	22	(Italy) Aston Martin Racing BMS	(Italy) Enrico Toccacelo (Italy) Alex Frassinetti (Italy) Gabriele Lancieri (Italy) Riccardo Ragazzi	Aston Martin DBR9	P	13
46 DNF	GT1	22	(Italy) Aston Martin Racing BMS	(Italy) Enrico Toccacelo (Italy) Alex Frassinetti (Italy) Gabriele Lancieri (Italy) Riccardo Ragazzi	Aston Martin 6.0L V12	P	13

== Statistics ==
- Pole Position – #5 Carsport Holland – 2:14.554
- Average Speed – 155.21 km/h

FIA GT Championship
Previous race: 2007 FIA GT Oschersleben 2 Hours	2007 season	Next race: 2007 FIA GT Adria 2 Hours
