= 2006 Spa 24 Hours =

Endurance motor race in Belgium

2006 Proximus Spa 24 Hours

Seasons
- ← 2005 2007 →

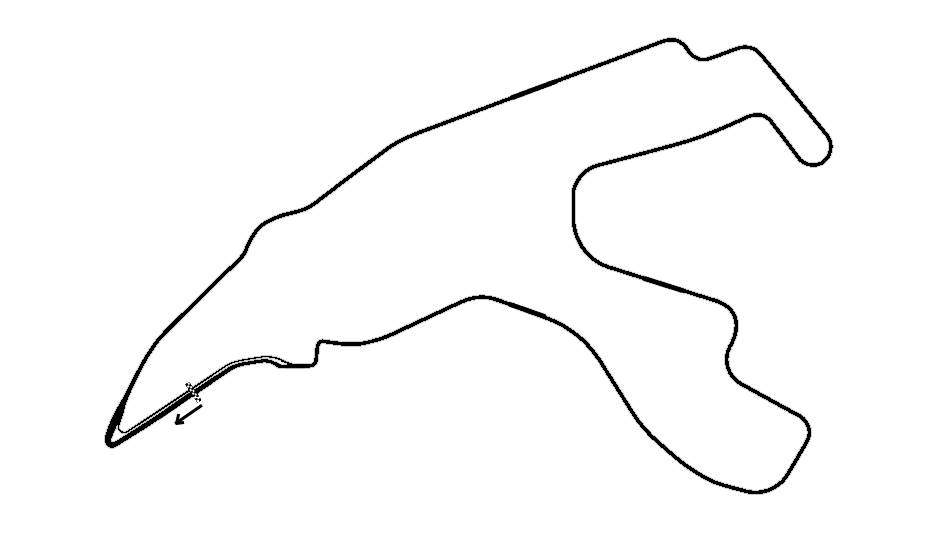
Layout of the Circuit de Spa-Francorchamps (2004-2006)

The 2006 Proximus Spa 24 Hours was the fourth race is the final race before the summer break for the 2006 FIA GT Championship season. It took place on 29 and 30 July 2006. It set a record for the furthest distance run since the event changed to the shorter 7 km track in 1979.

This race saw Porsche debut their new 997-generation GT3-RSR in the hands of Manthey Racing.

== Half-point Leaders ==
In the FIA GT Championship (using the GT1 and GT2 classes), the top 8 teams are awarded half-points for their position both at the six-hour mark and at the midway part of the race.

=== 6 Hour Leaders in GT1 ===
| Pos | No | Team | Laps |
|---|---|---|---|
| 1 | 5 | (Germany) Phoenix Racing | 148 |
| 2 | 1 | (Germany) Vitaphone Racing Team | 148 |
| 3 | 4 | (Belgium) GLPK-Carsport | 148 |
| 4 | 9 | (Germany) Zakspeed Racing | 146 |
| 5 | 33 | (Austria) Race Alliance | 144 |
| 6 | 24 | (Italy) Aston Martin Racing BMS | 144 |
| 7 | 23 | (Italy) Aston Martin Racing BMS | 144 |
| 8 | 36 | (Belgium) PSI Experience | 141 |

=== 6 Hour Leaders in GT2 ===
| Pos | No | Team | Laps |
|---|---|---|---|
| 1 | 59 | (Italy) AF Corse | 143 |
| 2 | 58 | (Italy) AF Corse | 143 |
| 3 | 70 | (Italy) GPC Sport | 140 |
| 4 | 80 | (Netherlands) Spyker Squadron | 139 |
| 5 | 62 | (United Kingdom) Scuderia Ecosse | 136 |
| 6 | 52 | (Austria) Renauer Motorsport Team | 136 |
| 7 | 78 | (Belgium) Ice Pol Racing Team | 134 |
| 8 | 63 | (United Kingdom) Scuderia Ecosse | 134 |

=== 12 Hour Leaders in GT1 ===
| Pos | No | Team | Laps |
|---|---|---|---|
| 1 | 5 | (Germany) Phoenix Racing | 293 |
| 2 | 1 | (Germany) Vitaphone Racing Team | 292 |
| 3 | 4 | (Belgium) GLPK-Carsport | 292 |
| 4 | 9 | (Germany) Zakspeed Racing | 290 |
| 5 | 23 | (Italy) Aston Martin Racing BMS | 286 |
| 6 | 34 | (Belgium) PSI Experience | 281 |
| 7 | 36 | (Belgium) PSI Experience | 278 |
| 8 | 33 | (Austria) Race Alliance | 257 |

=== 12 Hour Leaders in GT2 ===
| Pos | No | Team | Laps |
|---|---|---|---|
| 1 | 58 | (Italy) AF Corse | 280 |
| 2 | 59 | (Italy) AF Corse | 280 |
| 3 | 70 | (Italy) GPC Sport | 275 |
| 4 | 80 | (Netherlands) Spyker Squadron | 275 |
| 5 | 62 | (United Kingdom) Scuderia Ecosse | 271 |
| 6 | 52 | (Austria) Renauer Motorsport Team | 263 |
| 7 | 74 | (Italy) Ebimotors | 262 |
| 8 | 66 | (Germany) Team Felbermayr-Proton | 262 |

== Official results ==
Class winners in bold. Cars failing to complete 70% of winner's distance marked as Not Classified (NC).

| Pos | Class | No | Team | Drivers | Chassis | Tyre | Laps |
| Pos | Class | No | Team | Drivers | Engine | Tyre | Laps |
|---|---|---|---|---|---|---|---|
| 1 | **GT1** | **1** | **(Germany) Vitaphone Racing Team** | **(Italy) Andrea Bertolini (Germany) Michael Bartels (Belgium) Eric van de Poele** | **Maserati MC12 GT1** | **P** | **589** |
| 1 | **GT1** | **1** | **(Germany) Vitaphone Racing Team** | **(Italy) Andrea Bertolini (Germany) Michael Bartels (Belgium) Eric van de Poele** | **Maserati 6.0L V12** | **P** | **589** |
| 2 | GT1 | 5 | (Germany) Phoenix Racing | (Italy) Andrea Piccini (Switzerland) Jean-Denis Délétraz (Switzerland) Marcel Fässler (Belgium) Stéphane Lémeret | Aston Martin DBR9 | **M** | 589 |
| 2 | GT1 | 5 | (Germany) Phoenix Racing | (Italy) Andrea Piccini (Switzerland) Jean-Denis Délétraz (Switzerland) Marcel Fässler (Belgium) Stéphane Lémeret | Aston Martin 6.0L V12 | **M** | 589 |
| 3 | GT1 | 4 | (Belgium) GLPK-Carsport | (Netherlands) Mike Hezemans (Belgium) Bert Longin (Belgium) Anthony Kumpen (Belgium) Kurt Mollekens | Chevrolet Corvette C6.R | **M** | 580 |
| 3 | GT1 | 4 | (Belgium) GLPK-Carsport | (Netherlands) Mike Hezemans (Belgium) Bert Longin (Belgium) Anthony Kumpen (Belgium) Kurt Mollekens | Chevrolet 7.0L V8 | **M** | 580 |
| 4 | GT1 | 23 | (Italy) Aston Martin Racing BMS | (Italy) Christian Pescatori (Italy) Fabio Babini (Netherlands) Peter Kox (Czech Republic) Tomáš Enge | Aston Martin DBR9 | **P** | 578 |
| 4 | GT1 | 23 | (Italy) Aston Martin Racing BMS | (Italy) Christian Pescatori (Italy) Fabio Babini (Netherlands) Peter Kox (Czech Republic) Tomáš Enge | Aston Martin 6.0L V12 | **P** | 578 |
| 5 | GT1 | 34 | (Belgium) PSI Experience | (Netherlands) Jos Menten (France) Jean-Philippe Belloc (France) Patrick Bornhauser (Belgium) Fréderic Bouvy | Chevrolet Corvette C6.R | **D** | 565 |
| 5 | GT1 | 34 | (Belgium) PSI Experience | (Netherlands) Jos Menten (France) Jean-Philippe Belloc (France) Patrick Bornhauser (Belgium) Fréderic Bouvy | Chevrolet 7.0L V8 | **D** | 565 |
| 6 | **GT2** | **59** | **(Italy) AF Corse** | **(Finland) Mika Salo (Portugal) Rui Águas (Germany) Timo Scheider** | **Ferrari F430 GT2** | **P** | **560** |
| 6 | **GT2** | **59** | **(Italy) AF Corse** | **(Finland) Mika Salo (Portugal) Rui Águas (Germany) Timo Scheider** | **Ferrari 4.0L V8** | **P** | **560** |
| 7 | GT2 | 58 | (Italy) AF Corse | (Brazil) Jaime Melo (Italy) Matteo Bobbi (Monaco) Stéphane Ortelli | Ferrari F430 GT2 | **P** | 557 |
| 7 | GT2 | 58 | (Italy) AF Corse | (Brazil) Jaime Melo (Italy) Matteo Bobbi (Monaco) Stéphane Ortelli | Ferrari 4.0L V8 | **P** | 557 |
| 8 | GT1 | 9 | (Germany) Zakspeed Racing | (Czech Republic) Jaroslav Janiš (Germany) Sascha Bert (Italy) Andrea Montermini (Czech Republic) Jan Charouz | Saleen S7-R | **M** | 554 |
| 8 | GT1 | 9 | (Germany) Zakspeed Racing | (Czech Republic) Jaroslav Janiš (Germany) Sascha Bert (Italy) Andrea Montermini (Czech Republic) Jan Charouz | Ford 7.0L V8 | **M** | 554 |
| 9 | GT2 | 62 | (United Kingdom) Scuderia Ecosse | (United Kingdom) Nathan Kinch (United Kingdom) Andrew Kirkaldy (United Kingdom) Marino Franchitti | Ferrari F430 GT2 | **M** | 548 |
| 9 | GT2 | 62 | (United Kingdom) Scuderia Ecosse | (United Kingdom) Nathan Kinch (United Kingdom) Andrew Kirkaldy (United Kingdom) Marino Franchitti | Ferrari 4.0L V8 | **M** | 548 |
| 10 | GT2 | 80 | (Netherlands) Spyker Squadron | (Netherlands) Jeroen Bleekemolen (United Kingdom) Jonny Kane (Netherlands) Donny Crevels | Spyker C8 Spyder GT2-R | **D** | 541 |
| 10 | GT2 | 80 | (Netherlands) Spyker Squadron | (Netherlands) Jeroen Bleekemolen (United Kingdom) Jonny Kane (Netherlands) Donny Crevels | Audi 3.8L V8 | **D** | 541 |
| 11 | GT1 | 36 | (Belgium) PSI Experience | (Finland) Pertti Kuismanen (Finland) Markus Palttala (Belgium) Bernard Dehez (Belgium) Vincent Radermecker | Chevrolet Corvette C5-R | **D** | 530 |
| 11 | GT1 | 36 | (Belgium) PSI Experience | (Finland) Pertti Kuismanen (Finland) Markus Palttala (Belgium) Bernard Dehez (Belgium) Vincent Radermecker | Chevrolet 7.0L V8 | **D** | 530 |
| 12 | GT2 | 66 | (Germany) Team Felbermayr-Proton | (Germany) Christian Ried (Germany) Gerold Ried (Austria) Horst Felbermayr Sr. (Austria) Horst Felbermayr Jr. | Porsche 911 GT3-RSR | **M** | 530 |
| 12 | GT2 | 66 | (Germany) Team Felbermayr-Proton | (Germany) Christian Ried (Germany) Gerold Ried (Austria) Horst Felbermayr Sr. (Austria) Horst Felbermayr Jr. | Porsche 3.6L Flat-6 | **M** | 530 |
| 13 | GT2 | 63 | (United Kingdom) Scuderia Ecosse | (United Kingdom) Tim Mullen (Canada) Chris Niarchos (Denmark) Allan Simonsen | Ferrari F430 GT2 | **M** | 524 |
| 13 | GT2 | 63 | (United Kingdom) Scuderia Ecosse | (United Kingdom) Tim Mullen (Canada) Chris Niarchos (Denmark) Allan Simonsen | Ferrari 4.0L V8 | **M** | 524 |
| 14 | **G2** | **197** | **(Germany) Manthey Racing (Germany) Porsche AG** | **(Germany) Lucas Luhr (Germany) Sascha Maassen (Germany) Marcel Tiemann** | **Porsche 997 GT3-RSR** | **M** | **518** |
| 14 | **G2** | **197** | **(Germany) Manthey Racing (Germany) Porsche AG** | **(Germany) Lucas Luhr (Germany) Sascha Maassen (Germany) Marcel Tiemann** | **Porsche 3.8L Flat-6** | **M** | **518** |
| 15 | G2 | 111 | (Germany) Manthey Racing (Germany) Porsche AG | (Germany) Timo Bernhard (Germany) Marc Lieb (Portugal) Pedro Lamy | Porsche 997 GT3-RSR | **M** | 512 |
| 15 | G2 | 111 | (Germany) Manthey Racing (Germany) Porsche AG | (Germany) Timo Bernhard (Germany) Marc Lieb (Portugal) Pedro Lamy | Porsche 3.8L Flat-6 | **M** | 512 |
| 16 | GT2 | 78 | (Belgium) Ice Pol Racing Team | (Belgium) Yves Lambert (Belgium) Christian Lefort (Belgium) Marc Goossens (Belgium) Marc Duez | Porsche 911 GT3-RS | **D** | 512 |
| 16 | GT2 | 78 | (Belgium) Ice Pol Racing Team | (Belgium) Yves Lambert (Belgium) Christian Lefort (Belgium) Marc Goossens (Belgium) Marc Duez | Porsche 3.6L Flat-6 | **D** | 512 |
| 17 | **G3** | **116** | **(Belgium) Signa Racing** | **(Belgium) Patrick Chaillet (Belgium) Laurent Nef (Belgium) Loïc Deman (Belgium) Christophe Geoffroy** | **Dodge Viper Competition Coupe** | **P** | **511** |
| 17 | **G3** | **116** | **(Belgium) Signa Racing** | **(Belgium) Patrick Chaillet (Belgium) Laurent Nef (Belgium) Loïc Deman (Belgium) Christophe Geoffroy** | **Dodge 8.3L V10** | **P** | **511** |
| 18 | GT2 | 71 | (Spain) RSV Motorsport | (Germany) Ronald Severin (Spain) Domingo Romero (France) Michel Ligonnet (Sweden) Peter Sundberg | Ferrari F430 GT2 | **M** | 510 |
| 18 | GT2 | 71 | (Spain) RSV Motorsport | (Germany) Ronald Severin (Spain) Domingo Romero (France) Michel Ligonnet (Sweden) Peter Sundberg | Ferrari 4.0L V8 | **M** | 510 |
| 19 | GT2 | 72 | (Italy) AB Motorsport | (Italy) Antonio De Castro (Italy) Bruno Barbaro (Italy) Renato Premoli | Porsche 911 GT3-RS | **D** | 507 |
| 19 | GT2 | 72 | (Italy) AB Motorsport | (Italy) Antonio De Castro (Italy) Bruno Barbaro (Italy) Renato Premoli | Porsche 3.6L Flat-6 | **D** | 507 |
| 20 | G3 | 195 | (Belgium) Prospeed Competition | (Belgium) François Duval (Belgium) Christophe Kerkhove (Belgium) Christian Kelders (Belgium) Pascal Nelissen-Grade | Porsche 911 GT3 Cup | **M** | 504 |
| 20 | G3 | 195 | (Belgium) Prospeed Competition | (Belgium) François Duval (Belgium) Christophe Kerkhove (Belgium) Christian Kelders (Belgium) Pascal Nelissen-Grade | Porsche 3.6L Flat-6 | **M** | 504 |
| 21 | G2 | 179 | (Monaco) JMB Racing | (Belgium) Didier de Radiguès (Belgium) Charles de Pauw (Belgium) Alain van den Hove (France) Paul Belmondo | Ferrari 360 Modena GTC | **P** | 498 |
| 21 | G2 | 179 | (Monaco) JMB Racing | (Belgium) Didier de Radiguès (Belgium) Charles de Pauw (Belgium) Alain van den Hove (France) Paul Belmondo | Ferrari 3.6L V8 | **P** | 498 |
| 22 | G2 | 199 | (Austria) Race Alliance | (Austria) Lukas Lichtner-Hoyer (Austria) Thomas Gruber (Austria) Klaus Engelhorn (Belgium) Armand Fumal | BMW M3 GTR | **P** | 492 |
| 22 | G2 | 199 | (Austria) Race Alliance | (Austria) Lukas Lichtner-Hoyer (Austria) Thomas Gruber (Austria) Klaus Engelhorn (Belgium) Armand Fumal | BMW 3.2L I6 | **P** | 492 |
| 23 | G3 | 113 | (France) Pouchelon Racing | (France) Gilles Duqueine (France) Gaël Lesoudier (France) Benoit Rousselot (France) Stéphane Lacroix-Wasover | Dodge Viper Competition Coupe | **M** | 484 |
| 23 | G3 | 113 | (France) Pouchelon Racing | (France) Gilles Duqueine (France) Gaël Lesoudier (France) Benoit Rousselot (France) Stéphane Lacroix-Wasover | Dodge 8.3L V10 | **M** | 484 |
| 24 | G3 | 117 | (France) Jean Charles Levy | (France) Philippe Levy (France) Jean Charles Levy (France) Michel Mitieus (France) Gérard Tremblay | Porsche 911 GT3 Cup | **D** | 481 |
| 24 | G3 | 117 | (France) Jean Charles Levy | (France) Philippe Levy (France) Jean Charles Levy (France) Michel Mitieus (France) Gérard Tremblay | Porsche 3.6L Flat-6 | **D** | 481 |
| 25 | GT2 | 74 | (Italy) Ebimotors | (Italy) Luigi Moccia (Italy) Emanuele Busnelli (United Kingdom) Johnny Mowlem | Porsche 911 GT3-RSR | **P** | 468 |
| 25 | GT2 | 74 | (Italy) Ebimotors | (Italy) Luigi Moccia (Italy) Emanuele Busnelli (United Kingdom) Johnny Mowlem | Porsche 3.6L Flat-6 | **P** | 468 |
| 26 | G2 | 194 | (Belgium) Prospeed Competition | (Belgium) Rudi Penders (Belgium) Franz Lamot (Belgium) Jean-François Hemroulle | Porsche 911 GT3-RS | **M** | 464 |
| 26 | G2 | 194 | (Belgium) Prospeed Competition | (Belgium) Rudi Penders (Belgium) Franz Lamot (Belgium) Jean-François Hemroulle | Porsche 3.6L Flat-6 | **M** | 464 |
| 27 | G2 | 107 | (France) Red Racing | (France) Romain Yvon (France) Thierry Stépec (France) Hervé Knapick (Belgium) Olivier Muytjens | Chrysler Viper GTS-R | **P** | 441 |
| 27 | G2 | 107 | (France) Red Racing | (France) Romain Yvon (France) Thierry Stépec (France) Hervé Knapick (Belgium) Olivier Muytjens | Chrysler 8.0L V10 | **P** | 441 |
| 28 | G3 | 121 | (Belgium) Speedlover | (France) Julien Schell (Belgium) Jürgen van Hover (Netherlands) Roger Grouwels | Porsche 911 GT3 Cup | ? | 437 |
| 28 | G3 | 121 | (Belgium) Speedlover | (France) Julien Schell (Belgium) Jürgen van Hover (Netherlands) Roger Grouwels | Porsche 3.6L Flat-6 | ? | 437 |
| 29 | GT1 | 33 | (Austria) Race Alliance | (Austria) Karl Wendlinger (Austria) Philipp Peter (France) Christophe Bouchut (Austria) Robert Lechner | Aston Martin DBR9 | **D** | 413 |
| 29 | GT1 | 33 | (Austria) Race Alliance | (Austria) Karl Wendlinger (Austria) Philipp Peter (France) Christophe Bouchut (Austria) Robert Lechner | Aston Martin 6.0L V12 | **D** | 413 |
| 30 DNF | GT2 | 70 | (Italy) GPC Sport | (Switzerland) Gabriele Gardel (Italy) Fabrizio De Simone (Italy) Luca Drudi (Italy) Marco Cioci | Ferrari F430 GT2 | **P** | 390 |
| 30 DNF | GT2 | 70 | (Italy) GPC Sport | (Switzerland) Gabriele Gardel (Italy) Fabrizio De Simone (Italy) Luca Drudi (Italy) Marco Cioci | Ferrari 4.0L V8 | **P** | 390 |
| 31 DNF | G3 | 110 | (Belgium) GPR Racing | (Belgium) Nicolas de Gastines (France) Philippe Haezebrouck (Belgium) Tom Cloet | Porsche 911 GT3 Cup (997) | ? | 388 |
| 31 DNF | G3 | 110 | (Belgium) GPR Racing | (Belgium) Nicolas de Gastines (France) Philippe Haezebrouck (Belgium) Tom Cloet | Porsche 3.6L Flat-6 | ? | 388 |
| 32 DNF | GT2 | 52 | (Austria) Renauer Motorsport Team | (Germany) Wolfgang Kaufmann (Italy) Luca Moro (Austria) Manfred Jurasz (Hong Kong) Darryl O'Young | Porsche 911 GT3-RSR | **D** | 307 |
| 32 DNF | GT2 | 52 | (Austria) Renauer Motorsport Team | (Germany) Wolfgang Kaufmann (Italy) Luca Moro (Austria) Manfred Jurasz (Hong Kong) Darryl O'Young | Porsche 3.6L Flat-6 | **D** | 307 |
| 33 DNF | G3 | 115 | (Italy) BMS Scuderia Italia | (Italy) Franco Groppi (Switzerland) Toni Seiler (Italy) Davide Stancheris (Italy) Diego Alessi | Aston Martin DBRS9 | **P** | 264 |
| 33 DNF | G3 | 115 | (Italy) BMS Scuderia Italia | (Italy) Franco Groppi (Switzerland) Toni Seiler (Italy) Davide Stancheris (Italy) Diego Alessi | Aston Martin 6.0L V12 | **P** | 264 |
| 34 DNF | G3 | 105 | (Belgium) First Motorsport | (Belgium) Jean-Claude Meert (Belgium) Peter Van Delm (Belgium) Maxime Martin (Belgium) Dries Heyman | Porsche 911 GT3 Cup | **P** | 232 |
| 34 DNF | G3 | 105 | (Belgium) First Motorsport | (Belgium) Jean-Claude Meert (Belgium) Peter Van Delm (Belgium) Maxime Martin (Belgium) Dries Heyman | Porsche 3.6L Flat-6 | **P** | 232 |
| 35 DNF | GT1 | 24 | (Italy) Aston Martin Racing BMS | (Italy) Fabrizio Gollin (Portugal) Miguel Ramos (Italy) Gabriele Lancieri (Italy) Matteo Malucelli | Aston Martin DBR9 | **P** | 179 |
| 35 DNF | GT1 | 24 | (Italy) Aston Martin Racing BMS | (Italy) Fabrizio Gollin (Portugal) Miguel Ramos (Italy) Gabriele Lancieri (Italy) Matteo Malucelli | Aston Martin 6.0L V12 | **P** | 179 |
| 36 DNF | GT2 | 56 | (Monaco) JMB Racing | (France) Antoine Gosse (Netherlands) Peter Kutemann (France) Jean-Pierre Malcher | Ferrari F430 GT2 | **P** | 144 |
| 36 DNF | GT2 | 56 | (Monaco) JMB Racing | (France) Antoine Gosse (Netherlands) Peter Kutemann (France) Jean-Pierre Malcher | Ferrari 4.0L V8 | **P** | 144 |
| 37 DNF | GT2 | 75 | (Italy) Ebimotors | (France) Emmanuel Collard (Italy) Luca Riccitelli (France) Romain Dumas | Porsche 911 GT3-RSR | **P** | 141 |
| 37 DNF | GT2 | 75 | (Italy) Ebimotors | (France) Emmanuel Collard (Italy) Luca Riccitelli (France) Romain Dumas | Porsche 3.6L Flat-6 | **P** | 141 |
| 38 DNF | GT2 | 55 | (Monaco) JMB Racing | (United Kingdom) Tim Sugden (Switzerland) Iradj Alexander (Belgium) Jean-Michel Martin (France) Stéphane Daoudi | Ferrari F430 GT2 | **P** | 133 |
| 38 DNF | GT2 | 55 | (Monaco) JMB Racing | (United Kingdom) Tim Sugden (Switzerland) Iradj Alexander (Belgium) Jean-Michel Martin (France) Stéphane Daoudi | Ferrari 4.0L V8 | **P** | 133 |
| 39 DNF | G3 | 114 | (France) Pouchelon Racing | (United Kingdom) Anthony Reid (United Kingdom) Ian Khan (Netherlands) Paul van Splunteren (Belgium) Maxime Dumarey | Dodge Viper Competition Coupe | **M** | 125 |
| 39 DNF | G3 | 114 | (France) Pouchelon Racing | (United Kingdom) Anthony Reid (United Kingdom) Ian Khan (Netherlands) Paul van Splunteren (Belgium) Maxime Dumarey | Dodge 8.3L V10 | **M** | 125 |
| 40 DNF | G3 | 118 | (France) Pilotage Passion | (France) Christian Beau (France) Philippe Nozière (France) Rémy Brouard (France) Olivier Baron | Dodge Viper Competition Coupe | **P** | 55 |
| 40 DNF | G3 | 118 | (France) Pilotage Passion | (France) Christian Beau (France) Philippe Nozière (France) Rémy Brouard (France) Olivier Baron | Dodge 8.3L V10 | **P** | 55 |
| 41 DNF | GT1 | 35 | (Belgium) Renstal Excelsior | (Monaco) Geoffroy Horion (Belgium) Maxime Soulet (Netherlands) David Hart (United Kingdom) Chris Buncombe | Chevrolet Corvette C5-R | **M** | 52 |
| 41 DNF | GT1 | 35 | (Belgium) Renstal Excelsior | (Monaco) Geoffroy Horion (Belgium) Maxime Soulet (Netherlands) David Hart (United Kingdom) Chris Buncombe | Chevrolet 7.0L V8 | **M** | 52 |
| 42 DNF | GT1 | 2 | (Germany) Vitaphone Racing Team | (Italy) Thomas Biagi (United Kingdom) Jamie Davies (Belgium) Vincent Vosse | Maserati MC12 GT1 | **P** | 44 |
| 42 DNF | GT1 | 2 | (Germany) Vitaphone Racing Team | (Italy) Thomas Biagi (United Kingdom) Jamie Davies (Belgium) Vincent Vosse | Maserati 6.0L V12 | **P** | 44 |
| 43 DNF | G2 | 101 | (Belgium) Belgian Racing | (Belgium) Bas Leinders (Belgium) Renaud Kuppens (Belgium) Jérôme d'Ambrosio | Gillet Vertigo Streiff | **D** | 43 |
| 43 DNF | G2 | 101 | (Belgium) Belgian Racing | (Belgium) Bas Leinders (Belgium) Renaud Kuppens (Belgium) Jérôme d'Ambrosio | Alfa Romeo 3.6L V6 | **D** | 43 |

== Statistics ==
- Pole Position – #5 Phoenix Racing – 2:14.9
- Distance – 4104.152 km
- Average Speed – 171.00 km/h

FIA GT Championship
| Previous race: 2006 FIA GT Oschersleben 500km | 2006 season | Next race: 2006 FIA GT Paul Ricard 500km |
