= Gillet =

Belgian automobile manufacturer

- Type: Public
- Industry: Automotive
- Founded: 1992
- Headquarters: Rue Saucin 84, 5032 Gembloux, Belgium
- Key people: Tony Gillet
- Products: Hand-built cars

Gillet is a Belgian automobile manufacturer, started in 1992 by former racing driver Tony Gillet. The company produces the Vertigo sports coupé, an ultra-lightweight (990 kg) 'bespoke' and hand-built sportscar. The slogan of the company is "Supercar and work of art Pure Pleasure!". The first Vertigo was powered by a Ford Cosworth 2.0-litre 4-in-line, later evolutions are powered by more powerful engines: the 3.0-litre Alfa Romeo V6 engine and the 4.2-litre Ferrari/Maserati V8 in the Vertigo .5.

== Company background and design of the Vertigo ==
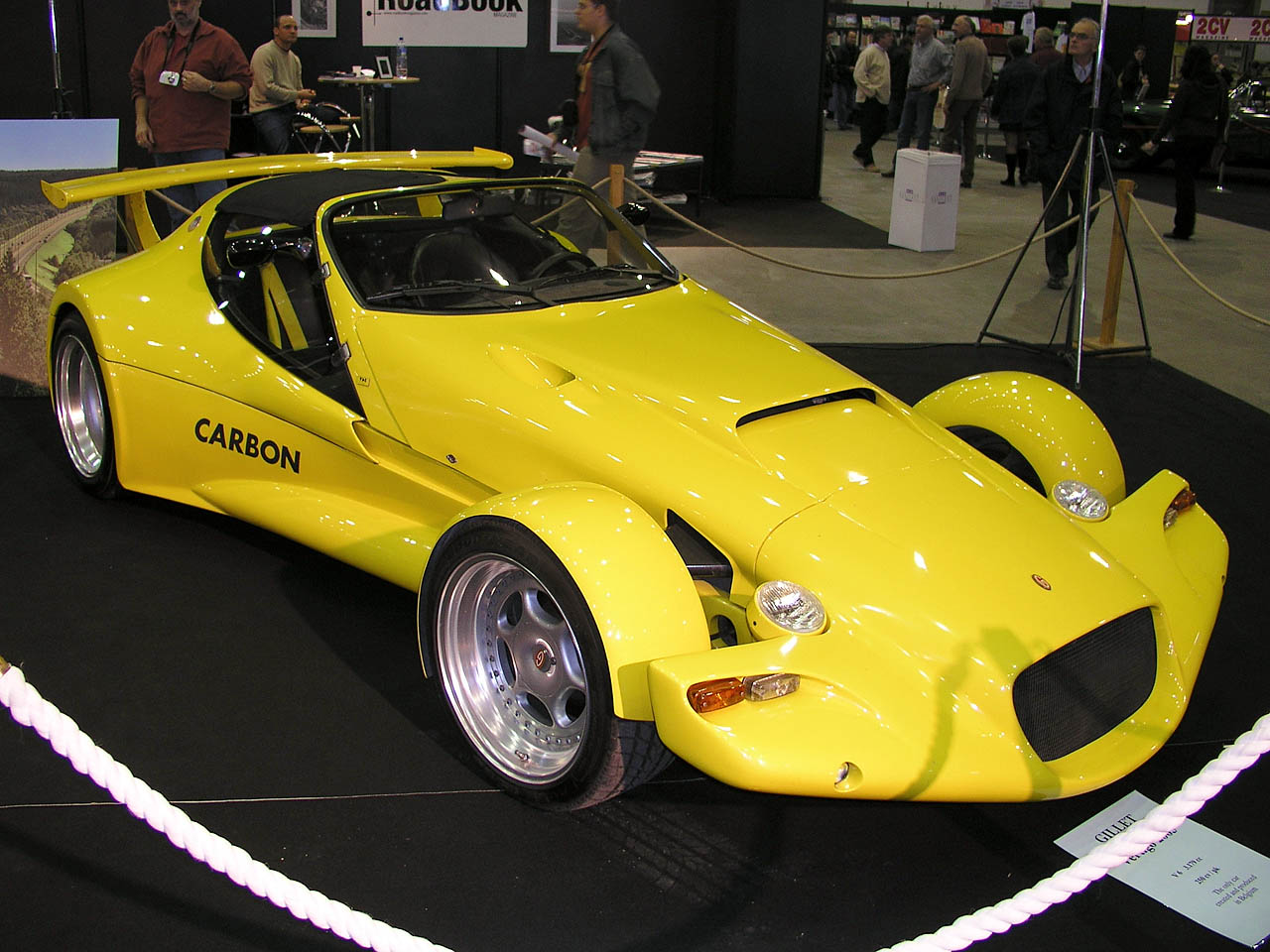
1994 Gillet Vertigo Mk 1

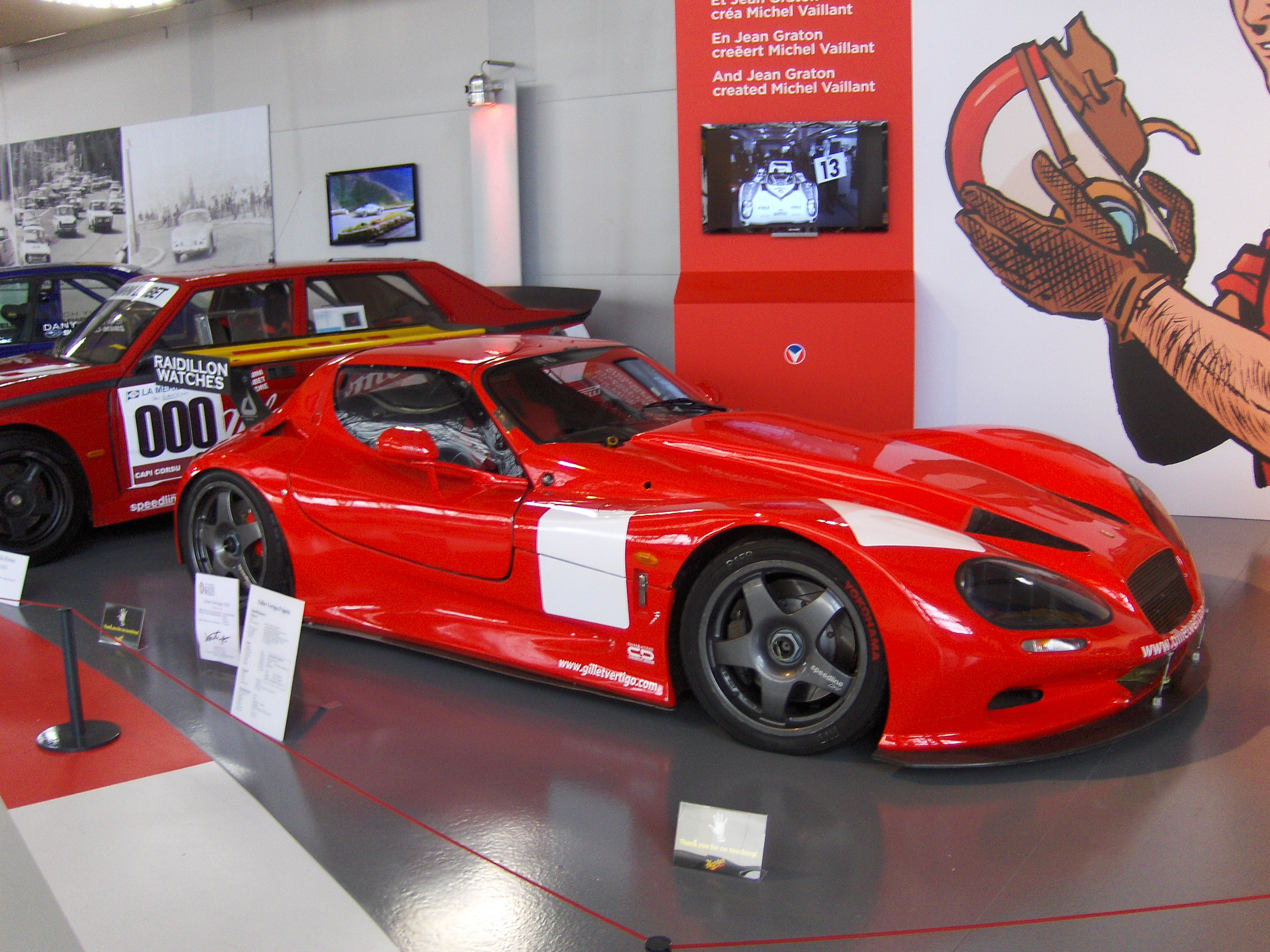
2013 Vertigo .5 Spirit with the 4.2-litre Ferrari/Maserati V8

Tony Gillet was a successful racing driver, winning the Belgian hill-climb championship in 1979 and 1980 and competing in two Dakar Rallies. In 1982 he became the Belgian importer for Donkervoort, a Dutch Lotus Super Seven-styled car. In January 1990 he broke the 0 to 100 km/h (62 mph) record for production cars with a time of 3.85 seconds in a specially modified Donkervoort. The Vertigo held the 0–100 km/h record for production cars at 3.1 seconds, but this has since been broken.

The first Vertigo prototype was finished in 1991 and shown at the 71st Brussels Auto Show in January 1992. In the following two years the car was finalised for production. It was shown at the Paris and Geneva car shows in 1993. Two more cars were built: a second prototype to finalise production design and the first production car, which was used for certification, including the frontal crash-test, seat anchorage resistance and safety belts anchorage resistance tests.

The production Vertigo differed from the first prototype in materials and design. The chassis was fabricated from carbon fibre and honeycomb materials (a technology directly borrowed from Formula One), ensuring greater strength and stiffness, while saving 58 kg (128 lb) in chassis weight. The body was given more fluid lines with higher side windows and retractable headlights, making it closer to the first design drawings.

Gillet introduced the Vertigo .5 at Brussels in January 2008. It incorporates features from the Vertigo race car used in the 2007 FIA GT race series.

Famous Vertigo-owners are Prince Albert of Monaco and the French singer and actor Johnny Hallyday.

In 2015, Zagato released a car based on the chassis of the Vertigo .5 at the Concorso d'Eleganza Villa d'Este: the Zagato Maserati Mostro. In 2017, Albert II, Prince of Monaco visited the factory in order to show his support for Gillet. During the same year, Gillet had the opportunity to collaborate with the company Transnubel by producing 3,750,000 cubes in composite intended to the Belgian nuclear industry.

In 2019, Gillet constructed a rolling chassis of Zagato Maserati Mostro, which is the first in a series of five. In 2026, The A' Design Award and Competition has announced Gillet's new and multipurpose supercar "Bella Riva" created by Switzerland lawyer Francesco Riva and Gillet Automobiles, as a Bronze winner in the Vehicle, Mobility and Transportation Design category.

== Racing ==
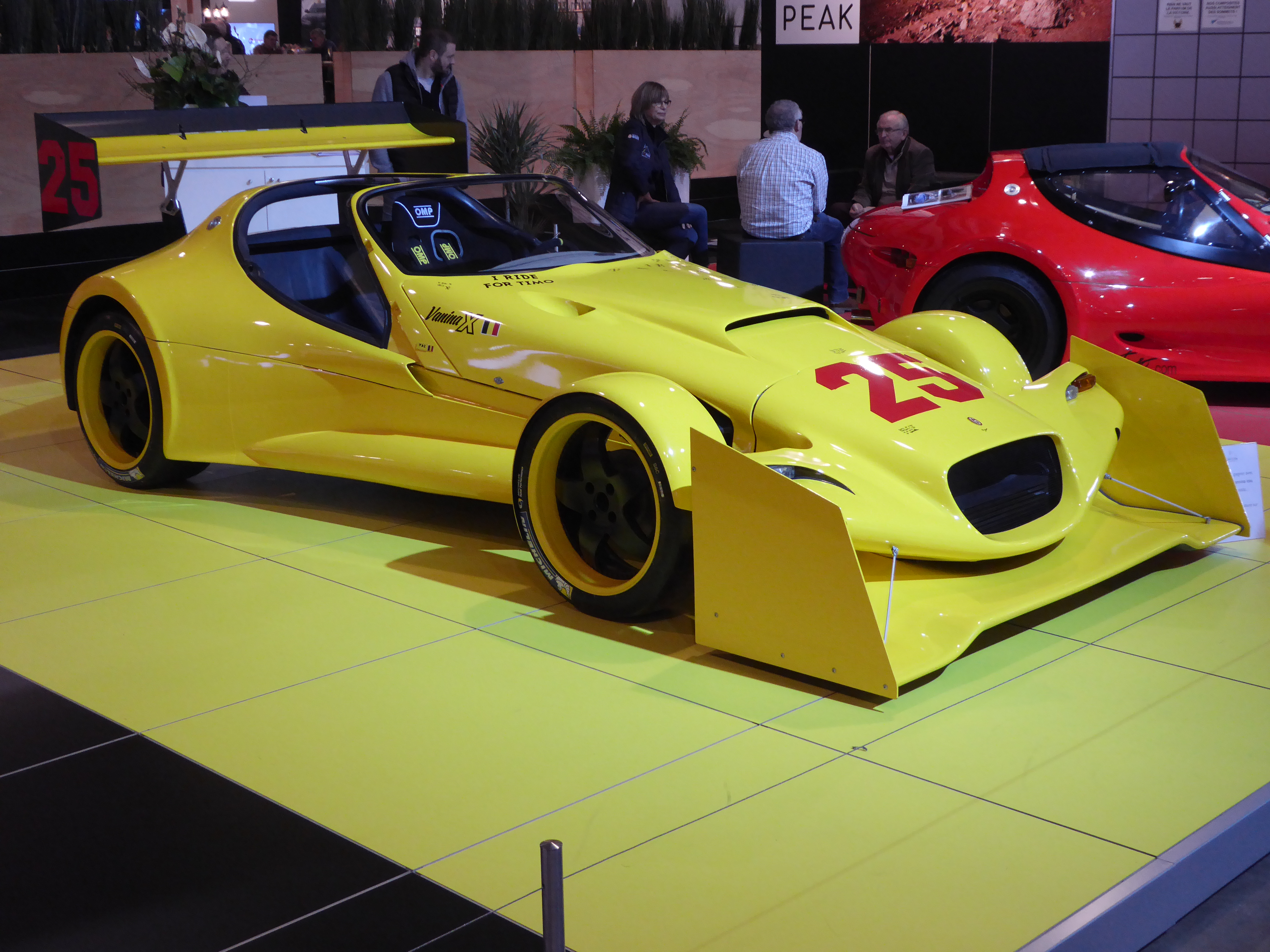
At European Motor Show Brussels 2018

Gillet is also active in motorsport with the racing version of the Gillet, named The Gillet Vertigo Streiff. Since 1998, the car has competed in the Belcar (Belgian GT Championship) and FIA GT Championship in the G2 Class for non-homologated cars.

The Vertigo Streiff was originally developed with a modified version of the Alfa Romeo V6 engine, with 3.6 L and 360 PS (265 kW; 355 hp). Gillet increased the displacement to 3,990 cc (243 cu in) in 2006. A GT3 version, with a national homologation, raced briefly in the 2007 Belcar season.

In the 2008 FIA GT season Renaud Kuppens raced using a Gillet Vertigo.5 with a Maserati 4.2 L V8 engine tuned to Group N specifications. Renaud Kuppens said that the Maserati engine develops the same amount of power as the V6 engine, but has more torque.

The car came 26th in both the 2002 and 2003 Spa 24 Hours, and 13th in 2004. It was entered into the 24 Hours of Spa race in 2005, 2006, 2007 and 2008, but failed to finish on all occasions.

In 2018, construction of a racing Vertigo with linen bodywork and participation to the famous Pike’s Peak race in Colorado with Vanina Ickx at the wheel.

== Models ==
=== Vertigo / Vertigo Mk 1 (1991–1997) ===
External image
- 1997 Vertigo with the 3.0-litre Alfa Romeo V6 engine

Gillet designed and completed the first Vertigo prototype with the 3.0-litre Alfa Romeo V6 engine for road use in 1991, and shown at the 71st Brussels Auto Show in January 1992. Its chassis was constructed completely of carbon fiber and honeycomb components, resulting in reduced overall weight to only 128 lbs. The Vertigo set a new 1994 Guinness-book record for speed in road cars with a 0-100 km/h (62 mph) acceleration in 3.266 seconds.

=== Vertigo Streiff (2002–2007) ===
- 2002 Gillet Vertigo Streiff's specifications

In 2002, Gillet developed the Vertigo Streiff, a model dedicated to Philippe Streiff, a former Formula One racing driver who got seriously injured at the 1989 Brazilian Grand Prix after an accident during pre-season testing. The model purchased by Streiff was modified to be joystick-controlled and given an automatic transmission. Only 25 units of the Vertigo Streiff were ever produced, each costing €103,000. The model had a carbon fiber body wrapped around an Alfa Romeo 3.6 liter V6 capable of 360 bhp, with a 0-62 mph time of 3.2 seconds.

=== Vertigo 5 / Vertigo.5 Spirit (2009–) ===
- 2008 Vertigo 5 with the 3.0-litre Alfa Romeo V6 engine

- 2013 Vertigo.5 Spirit with the 4.2-litre Ferrari/Maserati V8 engine

Since 2010, Gillet completely redesigned and dubbed the Vertigo.5 Spirit for sale. There were some changes in several sections: the 4.2-litre Ferrari/Maserati V8 replacing the 3.0 L V6 from Alfa Romeo, weighing around 2094 lbs with a 2,340 mm wheelbase, building up the suspension and brakes with double wishbones and tweaked absorbers and springs in the front. To be similar to most race cars, Gillet also used AP Racing 4pot calipers with 330 mm vented brake discs in the fronts, bundling a set of 19-inch glossy multi-spoked alloy rims with 225/35ZR19 tires up front and 275/35ZR19 at the back. Gillet provides entire customization service for the Vertigo.5 Spirit, and its basic price is $280,000 (around €260,000).
