= 2008 FIA GT Zolder 2 Hours =

2008 FIA GT Championship Season

Layout of the Circuit Zolder

The 2008 FIA GT Zolder 2 Hours was the penultimate race of the 2008 FIA GT Championship season. It took place at the Circuit Zolder, Belgium, on 19 October 2008.

== Race results ==
Class winners in bold. Cars failing to complete 75% of winner's distance marked as Not Classified (NC).

Pos	Class	No	Team	Drivers	Chassis	Tyre	Laps
Pos	Class	No	Team	Drivers	Engine	Tyre	Laps
1	**GT1**	**1**	**(Germany) Vitaphone Racing Team**	**(Germany) Michael Bartels (Italy) Andrea Bertolini**	**Maserati MC12 GT1**	MI	**80**
1	**GT1**	**1**	**(Germany) Vitaphone Racing Team**	**(Germany) Michael Bartels (Italy) Andrea Bertolini**	**Maserati 6.0 L V12**	MI	**80**
2	GT1	6	(Germany) Phoenix Carsport Racing	(Netherlands) Mike Hezemans (Italy) Fabrizio Gollin	Chevrolet Corvette C6.R	MI	80
2	GT1	6	(Germany) Phoenix Carsport Racing	(Netherlands) Mike Hezemans (Italy) Fabrizio Gollin	Chevrolet LS7R 7.0 L V8	MI	80
3	GT1	33	(Austria) Jetalliance Racing	(Austria) Karl Wendlinger (United Kingdom) Ryan Sharp	Aston Martin DBR9	MI	80
3	GT1	33	(Austria) Jetalliance Racing	(Austria) Karl Wendlinger (United Kingdom) Ryan Sharp	Aston Martin 6.0 L V12	MI	80
4	GT1	10	(United Kingdom) Gigawave Motorsport	(Austria) Philipp Peter (Denmark) Allan Simonsen	Aston Martin DBR9	MI	80
4	GT1	10	(United Kingdom) Gigawave Motorsport	(Austria) Philipp Peter (Denmark) Allan Simonsen	Aston Martin 6.0 L V12	MI	80
5	GT1	5	(Germany) Phoenix Carsport Racing	(Switzerland) Jean-Denis Délétraz (Switzerland) Marcel Fässler	Chevrolet Corvette C6.R	MI	80
5	GT1	5	(Germany) Phoenix Carsport Racing	(Switzerland) Jean-Denis Délétraz (Switzerland) Marcel Fässler	Chevrolet LS7R 7.0 L V8	MI	80
6	GT1	2	(Germany) Vitaphone Racing Team	(Portugal) Miguel Ramos (Brazil) Alexandre Negrão	Maserati MC12 GT1	MI	80
6	GT1	2	(Germany) Vitaphone Racing Team	(Portugal) Miguel Ramos (Brazil) Alexandre Negrão	Maserati 6.0 L V12	MI	80
7	GT1	7	(France) Larbre Compétition	(Belgium) Vincent Vosse (Belgium) Grégory Franchi	Saleen S7-R	MI	80
7	GT1	7	(France) Larbre Compétition	(Belgium) Vincent Vosse (Belgium) Grégory Franchi	Ford 7.0 L V8	MI	80
8	GT1	17	(Germany) Team Vitasystems	(Portugal) Pedro Lamy (Italy) Matteo Bobbi	Maserati MC12 GT1	MI	79
8	GT1	17	(Germany) Team Vitasystems	(Portugal) Pedro Lamy (Italy) Matteo Bobbi	Maserati 6.0 L V12	MI	79
9	**GT2**	**50**	**(Italy) AF Corse**	**(Italy) Gianmaria Bruni (Finland) Toni Vilander**	**Ferrari F430 GT2**	MI	**77**
9	**GT2**	**50**	**(Italy) AF Corse**	**(Italy) Gianmaria Bruni (Finland) Toni Vilander**	**Ferrari 4.0 L V8**	MI	**77**
10	GT2	77	(Italy) BMS Scuderia Italia	(Italy) Paolo Ruberti (Italy) Matteo Malucelli	Ferrari F430 GT2	P	77
10	GT2	77	(Italy) BMS Scuderia Italia	(Italy) Paolo Ruberti (Italy) Matteo Malucelli	Ferrari 4.0 L V8	P	77
11	GT2	60	(Belgium) Prospeed Competition	(Finland) Markus Palttala (Germany) Marc Lieb	Porsche 997 GT3-RSR	MI	77
11	GT2	60	(Belgium) Prospeed Competition	(Finland) Markus Palttala (Germany) Marc Lieb	Porsche 4.0 L Flat-6	MI	77
12	GT2	61	(Belgium) Prospeed Competition	(France) Emmanuel Collard (United Kingdom) Richard Westbrook	Porsche 997 GT3-RSR	MI	77
12	GT2	61	(Belgium) Prospeed Competition	(France) Emmanuel Collard (United Kingdom) Richard Westbrook	Porsche 4.0 L Flat-6	MI	77
13	GT2	95	(Italy) Advanced Engineering (Argentina) PeCom Racing Team	(Argentina) Matías Russo (Argentina) Luís Pérez Companc	Ferrari F430 GT2	MI	76
13	GT2	95	(Italy) Advanced Engineering (Argentina) PeCom Racing Team	(Argentina) Matías Russo (Argentina) Luís Pérez Companc	Ferrari 4.0 L V8	MI	76
14	GT2	55	(United Kingdom) CR Scuderia Racing	(United Kingdom) James Sutton (United Kingdom) Tim Mullen	Ferrari F430 GT2	MI	76
14	GT2	55	(United Kingdom) CR Scuderia Racing	(United Kingdom) James Sutton (United Kingdom) Tim Mullen	Ferrari 4.0 L V8	MI	76
15	GT2	78	(Italy) BMS Scuderia Italia	(Switzerland) Joël Camathias (Argentina) José Manuel Balbiani	Ferrari F430 GT2	P	76
15	GT2	78	(Italy) BMS Scuderia Italia	(Switzerland) Joël Camathias (Argentina) José Manuel Balbiani	Ferrari 4.0 L V8	P	76
16	**G2**	**164**	**(United Kingdom) Aston Martin Racing**	**(Czech Republic) Tomáš Enge (Germany) Stefan Mücke**	**Aston Martin V8 Vantage GT2**	MI	**76**
16	**G2**	**164**	**(United Kingdom) Aston Martin Racing**	**(Czech Republic) Tomáš Enge (Germany) Stefan Mücke**	**Aston Martin 4.5 L V8**	MI	**76**
17	G2	101	(Belgium) Belgian Racing	(Belgium) Bas Leinders (Belgium) Renaud Kuppens	Gillet Vertigo Streiff	P	74
17	G2	101	(Belgium) Belgian Racing	(Belgium) Bas Leinders (Belgium) Renaud Kuppens	Maserati 4.2 L V8	P	74
18 DNF	GT2	62	(United Kingdom) Scuderia Ecosse	(United Kingdom) Jamie Davies (Italy) Fabio Babini	Ferrari F430 GT2	P	63
18 DNF	GT2	62	(United Kingdom) Scuderia Ecosse	(United Kingdom) Jamie Davies (Italy) Fabio Babini	Ferrari 4.0 L V8	P	63
19 DNF	GT1	37	Escuderia ACA Argentina	(Argentina) José María López (Argentina) Martín Basso	Ferrari 550-GTS Maranello	MI	52
19 DNF	GT1	37	Escuderia ACA Argentina	(Argentina) José María López (Argentina) Martín Basso	Ferrari 5.9 L V12	MI	52
20 DNF	GT2	57	(Switzerland) Kessel Racing	(Switzerland) Henri Moser (Italy) Marcello Zani	Ferrari F430 GT2	MI	43
20 DNF	GT2	57	(Switzerland) Kessel Racing	(Switzerland) Henri Moser (Italy) Marcello Zani	Ferrari 4.0 L V8	MI	43
21 DNF	GT1	4	(Belgium) Peka Racing	(Belgium) Anthony Kumpen (Belgium) Bert Longin	Saleen S7-R	P	36
21 DNF	GT1	4	(Belgium) Peka Racing	(Belgium) Anthony Kumpen (Belgium) Bert Longin	Ford 7.0 L V8	P	36
22 DNF	GT1	3	(Belgium) Selleslagh Racing Team	(France) Christophe Bouchut (Netherlands) Xavier Maassen	Chevrolet Corvette C6.R	MI	30
22 DNF	GT1	3	(Belgium) Selleslagh Racing Team	(France) Christophe Bouchut (Netherlands) Xavier Maassen	Chevrolet LS7R 7.0 L V8	MI	30
23 DNF	GT2	51	(Italy) AF Corse	(Italy) Thomas Biagi (San Marino) Christian Montanari	Ferrari F430 GT2	MI	0
23 DNF	GT2	51	(Italy) AF Corse	(Italy) Thomas Biagi (San Marino) Christian Montanari	Ferrari 4.0 L V8	MI	0
24 DNF	GT2	56	(United Kingdom) CR Scuderia Racing	(United Kingdom) Andrew Kirkaldy (United Kingdom) Rob Bell	Ferrari F430 GT2	MI	0
24 DNF	GT2	56	(United Kingdom) CR Scuderia Racing	(United Kingdom) Andrew Kirkaldy (United Kingdom) Rob Bell	Ferrari 4.0 L V8	MI	0

== Statistics ==
- Pole Position – #33 Jetalliance Racing – 1:26.029
- Average Speed – 159.18 km/h (98.91 mph)

FIA GT Championship
Previous race: 2008 FIA GT Nogaro 2 Hours	2008 season	Next race: 2008 FIA GT San Luis 2 Hours
