= 2008 FIA GT Nogaro 2 Hours =

Layout of the Circuit Paul Armagnac

The 2008 FIA GT Nogaro 2 Hours was the eighth race of the 2008 FIA GT Championship season. It took place at the Circuit Paul Armagnac, France, on 5 October 2008.

== Race results ==
Class winners in bold. Cars failing to complete 75% of winner's distance marked as Not Classified (NC).

Pos	Class	No	Team	Drivers	Chassis	Tyre	Laps
Pos	Class	No	Team	Drivers	Engine	Tyre	Laps
1	**GT1**	**2**	**(Germany) Vitaphone Racing Team**	**(Portugal) Miguel Ramos (Brazil) Alexandre Negrão**	**Maserati MC12 GT1**	MI	**81**
1	**GT1**	**2**	**(Germany) Vitaphone Racing Team**	**(Portugal) Miguel Ramos (Brazil) Alexandre Negrão**	**Maserati 6.0 L V12**	MI	**81**
2	GT1	6	(Germany) Phoenix Carsport Racing	(Netherlands) Mike Hezemans (Italy) Fabrizio Gollin	Chevrolet Corvette C6.R	MI	81
2	GT1	6	(Germany) Phoenix Carsport Racing	(Netherlands) Mike Hezemans (Italy) Fabrizio Gollin	Chevrolet LS7R 7.0 L V8	MI	81
3	GT1	5	(Germany) Phoenix Carsport Racing	(Switzerland) Jean-Denis Délétraz (Switzerland) Marcel Fässler	Chevrolet Corvette C6.R	MI	81
3	GT1	5	(Germany) Phoenix Carsport Racing	(Switzerland) Jean-Denis Délétraz (Switzerland) Marcel Fässler	Chevrolet LS7R 7.0 L V8	MI	81
4	GT1	10	(United Kingdom) Gigawave Motorsport	(Austria) Philipp Peter (Denmark) Allan Simonsen	Aston Martin DBR9	MI	81
4	GT1	10	(United Kingdom) Gigawave Motorsport	(Austria) Philipp Peter (Denmark) Allan Simonsen	Aston Martin 6.0 L V12	MI	81
5	GT1	33	(Austria) Jetalliance Racing	(Austria) Karl Wendlinger (United Kingdom) Ryan Sharp	Aston Martin DBR9	MI	81
5	GT1	33	(Austria) Jetalliance Racing	(Austria) Karl Wendlinger (United Kingdom) Ryan Sharp	Aston Martin 6.0 L V12	MI	81
6	GT1	1	(Germany) Vitaphone Racing Team	(Germany) Michael Bartels (Italy) Andrea Bertolini	Maserati MC12 GT1	MI	81
6	GT1	1	(Germany) Vitaphone Racing Team	(Germany) Michael Bartels (Italy) Andrea Bertolini	Maserati 6.0 L V12	MI	81
7	GT1	7	(France) Larbre Compétition	(Belgium) Vincent Vosse (Belgium) Grégory Franchi	Saleen S7-R	MI	81
7	GT1	7	(France) Larbre Compétition	(Belgium) Vincent Vosse (Belgium) Grégory Franchi	Ford 7.0 L V8	MI	81
8	GT1	3	(Belgium) Selleslagh Racing Team	(France) Christophe Bouchut (Netherlands) Xavier Maassen	Chevrolet Corvette C6.R	MI	81
8	GT1	3	(Belgium) Selleslagh Racing Team	(France) Christophe Bouchut (Netherlands) Xavier Maassen	Chevrolet LS7R 7.0 L V8	MI	81
9	**GT2**	**61**	**(Belgium) Prospeed Competition**	**(Australia) Alex Davison (United Kingdom) Richard Westbrook**	**Porsche 997 GT3-RSR**	MI	**79**
9	**GT2**	**61**	**(Belgium) Prospeed Competition**	**(Australia) Alex Davison (United Kingdom) Richard Westbrook**	**Porsche 4.0 L Flat-6**	MI	**79**
10	GT2	55	(United Kingdom) CR Scuderia Racing	(Italy) Andrea Piccini (United Kingdom) Tim Mullen	Ferrari F430 GT2	MI	79
10	GT2	55	(United Kingdom) CR Scuderia Racing	(Italy) Andrea Piccini (United Kingdom) Tim Mullen	Ferrari 4.0 L V8	MI	79
11	GT2	50	(Italy) AF Corse	(Italy) Gianmaria Bruni (Finland) Toni Vilander	Ferrari F430 GT2	MI	79
11	GT2	50	(Italy) AF Corse	(Italy) Gianmaria Bruni (Finland) Toni Vilander	Ferrari 4.0 L V8	MI	79
12	GT2	57	(Switzerland) Kessel Racing	(Switzerland) Henri Moser (Italy) Maurizio Mediani	Ferrari F430 GT2	MI	79
12	GT2	57	(Switzerland) Kessel Racing	(Switzerland) Henri Moser (Italy) Maurizio Mediani	Ferrari 4.0 L V8	MI	79
13	GT1	37	Escuderia ACA Argentina	(Argentina) Esteban Tuero (Argentina) Gastón Mazzacane	Ferrari 550-GTS Maranello	MI	79
13	GT1	37	Escuderia ACA Argentina	(Argentina) Esteban Tuero (Argentina) Gastón Mazzacane	Ferrari 5.9 L V12	MI	79
14^{†}	GT2	51	(Italy) AF Corse	(Italy) Thomas Biagi (San Marino) Christian Montanari	Ferrari F430 GT2	MI	79
14^{†}	GT2	51	(Italy) AF Corse	(Italy) Thomas Biagi (San Marino) Christian Montanari	Ferrari 4.0 L V8	MI	79
15	GT2	62	(United Kingdom) Scuderia Ecosse	(United Kingdom) Jamie Davies (Italy) Fabio Babini	Ferrari F430 GT2	P	78
15	GT2	62	(United Kingdom) Scuderia Ecosse	(United Kingdom) Jamie Davies (Italy) Fabio Babini	Ferrari 4.0 L V8	P	78
16	GT2	77	(Italy) BMS Scuderia Italia	(Italy) Paolo Ruberti (Italy) Matteo Malucelli	Ferrari F430 GT2	P	78
16	GT2	77	(Italy) BMS Scuderia Italia	(Italy) Paolo Ruberti (Italy) Matteo Malucelli	Ferrari 4.0 L V8	P	78
17	GT2	56	(United Kingdom) CR Scuderia Racing	(United Kingdom) Andrew Kirkaldy (United Kingdom) Rob Bell	Ferrari F430 GT2	MI	78
17	GT2	56	(United Kingdom) CR Scuderia Racing	(United Kingdom) Andrew Kirkaldy (United Kingdom) Rob Bell	Ferrari 4.0 L V8	MI	78
18	GT2	95	(Italy) Advanced Engineering (Argentina) PeCom Racing Team	(Argentina) Matías Russo (Argentina) Luís Pérez Companc	Ferrari F430 GT2	MI	78
18	GT2	95	(Italy) Advanced Engineering (Argentina) PeCom Racing Team	(Argentina) Matías Russo (Argentina) Luís Pérez Companc	Ferrari 4.0 L V8	MI	78
19	GT2	78	(Italy) BMS Scuderia Italia	(Switzerland) Joël Camathias (Argentina) José Manuel Balbiani	Ferrari F430 GT2	P	77
19	GT2	78	(Italy) BMS Scuderia Italia	(Switzerland) Joël Camathias (Argentina) José Manuel Balbiani	Ferrari 4.0 L V8	P	77
20	**G2**	**164**	**(United Kingdom) Aston Martin Racing**	**(Czech Republic) Tomáš Enge (Germany) Stefan Mücke**	**Aston Martin V8 Vantage GT2**	MI	**77**
20	**G2**	**164**	**(United Kingdom) Aston Martin Racing**	**(Czech Republic) Tomáš Enge (Germany) Stefan Mücke**	**Aston Martin 4.5 L V8**	MI	**77**
21	GT2	59	(United Kingdom) Trackspeed Racing	(United Kingdom) David Ashburn (United Kingdom) Richard Williams	Porsche 997 GT3-RSR	MI	75
21	GT2	59	(United Kingdom) Trackspeed Racing	(United Kingdom) David Ashburn (United Kingdom) Richard Williams	Porsche 4.0 L Flat-6	MI	75
22 DNF	GT1	4	(Belgium) Peka Racing	(Belgium) Anthony Kumpen (Belgium) Bert Longin	Saleen S7-R	P	48
22 DNF	GT1	4	(Belgium) Peka Racing	(Belgium) Anthony Kumpen (Belgium) Bert Longin	Ford 7.0 L V8	P	48
23 DNF	GT1	9	(Belgium) DKR Engineering	(France) Jean-Philippe Dayraut (France) Julien Canal	Chevrolet Corvette C6.R	P	36
23 DNF	GT1	9	(Belgium) DKR Engineering	(France) Jean-Philippe Dayraut (France) Julien Canal	Chevrolet LS7R 7.0 L V8	P	36
24 DNF	GT2	60	(Belgium) Prospeed Competition	(Finland) Markus Palttala (Finland) Mikael Forsten	Porsche 997 GT3-RSR	MI	23
24 DNF	GT2	60	(Belgium) Prospeed Competition	(Finland) Markus Palttala (Finland) Mikael Forsten	Porsche 4.0 L Flat-6	MI	23
DNQ	GT1	36	(Austria) Jetalliance Racing	(Czech Republic) Jiří Janák (Germany) Alex Müller	Aston Martin DBR9	MI	–
DNQ	GT1	36	(Austria) Jetalliance Racing	(Czech Republic) Jiří Janák (Germany) Alex Müller	Aston Martin 6.0 L V12	MI	–

† – #51 AF Corse was given a 30-second time penalty after the race, the equivalent of a drive-through penalty.

== Statistics ==
- Pole Position – #5 Carsport Holland – 1:23.703
- Average Speed – 147.56 km/h (91.69 mph)

FIA GT Championship
Previous race: 2008 FIA GT Brno 2 Hours	2008 season	Next race: 2008 FIA GT Zolder 2 Hours
