= 2008 FIA GT Adria 2 Hours =

Layout of the Adria International Raceway

The 2008 FIA GT Adria 2 Hours was the third race of the 2008 FIA GT Championship season. It took place at Adria International Raceway, Italy, on June 21, 2008, and was held under night conditions for the second year in a row.

In post-race technical inspection, the three Porsches of Prospeed Competition and Trackspeed Racing were found to be using parts which did not match the parts used in the Porsche 997 GT3-RSR's homologation. The three Porsche entries were disqualified from the race even though the FIA admitted that the fault was caused by the manufacturer, not the teams. Prospeed Competition has appealed the disqualification of their two cars.

== Provisional race results ==
Class winners in bold. Cars failing to complete 75% of winner's distance marked as Not Classified (NC). Cars with a C under their class are running in the Citation Cup, with the winner marked in bold italics.

Pos	Class	No	Team	Drivers	Chassis	Tyre	Laps
Pos	Class	No	Team	Drivers	Engine	Tyre	Laps
1	**GT1**	**6**	**(Germany) Phoenix Carsport Racing**	**(Netherlands) Mike Hezemans (Italy) Fabrizio Gollin**	**Chevrolet Corvette C6.R**	MI	**96**
1	**GT1**	**6**	**(Germany) Phoenix Carsport Racing**	**(Netherlands) Mike Hezemans (Italy) Fabrizio Gollin**	**Chevrolet LS7R 7.0 L V8**	MI	**96**
2	GT1	1	(Germany) Vitaphone Racing Team	(Germany) Michael Bartels (Italy) Andrea Bertolini	Maserati MC12 GT1	MI	96
2	GT1	1	(Germany) Vitaphone Racing Team	(Germany) Michael Bartels (Italy) Andrea Bertolini	Maserati 6.0 L V12	MI	96
3	GT1	5	(Germany) Phoenix Carsport Racing	(Switzerland) Jean-Denis Délétraz (Switzerland) Marcel Fässler	Chevrolet Corvette C6.R	MI	96
3	GT1	5	(Germany) Phoenix Carsport Racing	(Switzerland) Jean-Denis Délétraz (Switzerland) Marcel Fässler	Chevrolet LS7R 7.0 L V8	MI	96
4	GT1	3	(Belgium) Selleslagh Racing Team	(France) Christophe Bouchut (Netherlands) Xavier Maassen	Chevrolet Corvette C6.R	MI	96
4	GT1	3	(Belgium) Selleslagh Racing Team	(France) Christophe Bouchut (Netherlands) Xavier Maassen	Chevrolet LS7R 7.0 L V8	MI	96
5	GT1	7	(France) Larbre Compétition	(Belgium) Vincent Vosse (Belgium) Grégory Franchi	Saleen S7-R	MI	96
5	GT1	7	(France) Larbre Compétition	(Belgium) Vincent Vosse (Belgium) Grégory Franchi	Ford 7.0 L V8	MI	96
6	GT1	10	(United Kingdom) Gigawave Motorsport	(Austria) Philipp Peter (Denmark) Allan Simonsen	Aston Martin DBR9	MI	95
6	GT1	10	(United Kingdom) Gigawave Motorsport	(Austria) Philipp Peter (Denmark) Allan Simonsen	Aston Martin 6.0 L V12	MI	95
7	GT1	15	(Monaco) JMB Racing	(France) Alain Ferté (United Kingdom) Ben Aucott	Maserati MC12 GT1	MI	95
7	GT1	15	(Monaco) JMB Racing	(France) Alain Ferté (United Kingdom) Ben Aucott	Maserati 6.0 L V12	MI	95
8	**GT2**	**50**	**(Italy) AF Corse**	**(Italy) Gianmaria Bruni (Finland) Toni Vilander**	**Ferrari F430 GT2**	MI	**93**
8	**GT2**	**50**	**(Italy) AF Corse**	**(Italy) Gianmaria Bruni (Finland) Toni Vilander**	**Ferrari 4.0 L V8**	MI	**93**
9	GT2	51	(Italy) AF Corse	(Italy) Thomas Biagi (San Marino) Christian Montanari	Ferrari F430 GT2	MI	93
9	GT2	51	(Italy) AF Corse	(Italy) Thomas Biagi (San Marino) Christian Montanari	Ferrari 4.0 L V8	MI	93
10	GT2	77	(Italy) BMS Scuderia Italia	(Italy) Paolo Ruberti (Italy) Matteo Malucelli	Ferrari F430 GT2	P	93
10	GT2	77	(Italy) BMS Scuderia Italia	(Italy) Paolo Ruberti (Italy) Matteo Malucelli	Ferrari 4.0 L V8	P	93
11	GT2	62	(United Kingdom) Scuderia Ecosse	(United Kingdom) Jamie Davies (Italy) Fabio Babini	Ferrari F430 GT2	P	93
11	GT2	62	(United Kingdom) Scuderia Ecosse	(United Kingdom) Jamie Davies (Italy) Fabio Babini	Ferrari 4.0 L V8	P	93
12	GT2	78	(Italy) BMS Scuderia Italia	(Switzerland) Joël Camathias (Italy) Davide Rigon	Ferrari F430 GT2	P	93
12	GT2	78	(Italy) BMS Scuderia Italia	(Switzerland) Joël Camathias (Italy) Davide Rigon	Ferrari 4.0 L V8	P	93
13	GT1	37	Escuderia ACA Argentina	(Argentina) José María López (Argentina) Esteban Tuero	Ferrari 550-GTS Maranello	MI	92
13	GT1	37	Escuderia ACA Argentina	(Argentina) José María López (Argentina) Esteban Tuero	Ferrari 5.9 L V12	MI	92
14	GT2	95	(Italy) Advanced Engineering (Argentina) PeCom Racing Team	(Argentina) Matías Russo (Argentina) Luís Pérez Companc	Ferrari F430 GT2	MI	92
14	GT2	95	(Italy) Advanced Engineering (Argentina) PeCom Racing Team	(Argentina) Matías Russo (Argentina) Luís Pérez Companc	Ferrari 4.0 L V8	MI	92
15	GT2	55	(United Kingdom) CR Scuderia Racing	(Canada) Chris Niarchos (United Kingdom) Tim Mullen	Ferrari F430 GT2	MI	92
15	GT2	55	(United Kingdom) CR Scuderia Racing	(Canada) Chris Niarchos (United Kingdom) Tim Mullen	Ferrari 4.0 L V8	MI	92
16	GT2	57	(Switzerland) Kessel Racing	(Switzerland) Henri Moser (Italy) Fabrizio del Monte	Ferrari F430 GT2	MI	91
16	GT2	57	(Switzerland) Kessel Racing	(Switzerland) Henri Moser (Italy) Fabrizio del Monte	Ferrari 4.0 L V8	MI	91
17	**GT1; C**	**12**	**(Austria) AT Racing (Austria) Renauer Motorsport Team**	**(Belarus) Alexander Talkanitsa (Germany) Wolfgang Kaufmann**	**Chevrolet Corvette C5-R**	MI	**88**
17	**GT1; C**	**12**	**(Austria) AT Racing (Austria) Renauer Motorsport Team**	**(Belarus) Alexander Talkanitsa (Germany) Wolfgang Kaufmann**	**Chevrolet LS7R 7.0 L V8**	MI	**88**
18	GT1	2	(Germany) Vitaphone Racing Team	(Portugal) Miguel Ramos (Brazil) Alexandre Negrão	Maserati MC12 GT1	MI	83
18	GT1	2	(Germany) Vitaphone Racing Team	(Portugal) Miguel Ramos (Brazil) Alexandre Negrão	Maserati 6.0 L V12	MI	83
19 DNF	GT1	36	(Austria) Jetalliance Racing	(Austria) Lukas Lichtner-Hoyer (Germany) Alex Müller	Aston Martin DBR9	MI	74
19 DNF	GT1	36	(Austria) Jetalliance Racing	(Austria) Lukas Lichtner-Hoyer (Germany) Alex Müller	Aston Martin 6.0 L V12	MI	74
20 DNF	G2	101	(Belgium) Belgian Racing	(Belgium) Bas Leinders (Belgium) Renaud Kuppens	Gillet Vertigo Streiff	P	44
20 DNF	G2	101	(Belgium) Belgian Racing	(Belgium) Bas Leinders (Belgium) Renaud Kuppens	Maserati 4.2 L V8	P	44
21 DNF	GT1	33	(Austria) Jetalliance Racing	(Austria) Karl Wendlinger (United Kingdom) Ryan Sharp	Aston Martin DBR9	MI	39
21 DNF	GT1	33	(Austria) Jetalliance Racing	(Austria) Karl Wendlinger (United Kingdom) Ryan Sharp	Aston Martin 6.0 L V12	MI	39
22 DNF	GT2	56	(United Kingdom) CR Scuderia Racing	(United Kingdom) Andrew Kirkaldy (United Kingdom) Rob Bell	Ferrari F430 GT2	MI	36
22 DNF	GT2	56	(United Kingdom) CR Scuderia Racing	(United Kingdom) Andrew Kirkaldy (United Kingdom) Rob Bell	Ferrari 4.0 L V8	MI	36
23 DNF	GT1	4	(Belgium) Peka Racing	(Belgium) Anthony Kumpen (Belgium) Bert Longin	Saleen S7-R	P	11
23 DNF	GT1	4	(Belgium) Peka Racing	(Belgium) Anthony Kumpen (Belgium) Bert Longin	Ford 7.0 L V8	P	11
24 DNF	GT1	13	(Austria) iPos Racing (Germany) Konrad Motorsport	(Netherlands) Jos Menten (Italy) Andrea Piccini	Saleen S7-R	P	8
24 DNF	GT1	13	(Austria) iPos Racing (Germany) Konrad Motorsport	(Netherlands) Jos Menten (Italy) Andrea Piccini	Ford 7.0 L V8	P	8
DSQ	GT2	61	(Belgium) Prospeed Competition	(France) Emmanuel Collard (United Kingdom) Richard Westbrook	Porsche 997 GT3-RSR	MI	93
DSQ	GT2	61	(Belgium) Prospeed Competition	(France) Emmanuel Collard (United Kingdom) Richard Westbrook	Porsche 3.8 L Flat-6	MI	93
DSQ	GT2	59	(United Kingdom) Trackspeed Racing	(United Kingdom) Richard Williams (United Kingdom) David Ashburn	Porsche 997 GT3-RSR	P	89
DSQ	GT2	59	(United Kingdom) Trackspeed Racing	(United Kingdom) Richard Williams (United Kingdom) David Ashburn	Porsche 3.8 L Flat-6	P	89
DSQ	GT2	60	(Belgium) Prospeed Competition	(Finland) Markus Palttala (Finland) Mikael Forsten	Porsche 997 GT3-RSR	MI	82
DSQ	GT2	60	(Belgium) Prospeed Competition	(Finland) Markus Palttala (Finland) Mikael Forsten	Porsche 3.8 L Flat-6	MI	82

== Statistics ==
- Pole Position – #5 Carsport Holland – 1:11.731
- Average Speed – 128.70 km/h

FIA GT Championship
Previous race: 2008 FIA GT Monza 2 Hours	2008 season	Next race: 2008 FIA GT Oschersleben 2 Hours
