= 2008 FIA GT Oschersleben 2 Hours =

4th race of the 2008 FIA GT Championship season

Layout of the Motorsport Arena Oschersleben

The 2008 FIA GT Oschersleben 2 Hours was the fourth race of the 2008 FIA GT Championship season. It took place at Motorsport Arena Oschersleben, Germany, on July 6, 2008.

== Race results ==
Class winners in bold. Cars failing to complete 75% of winner's distance marked as Not Classified (NC). Cars with a C under their class are running in the Citation Cup, with the winner marked in bold italics.

Pos	Class	No	Team	Drivers	Chassis	Tyre	Laps
Pos	Class	No	Team	Drivers	Engine	Tyre	Laps
1	**GT1**	**33**	**(Austria) Jetalliance Racing**	**(Austria) Karl Wendlinger (United Kingdom) Ryan Sharp**	**Aston Martin DBR9**	MI	**79**
1	**GT1**	**33**	**(Austria) Jetalliance Racing**	**(Austria) Karl Wendlinger (United Kingdom) Ryan Sharp**	**Aston Martin 6.0 L V12**	MI	**79**
2	GT1	36	(Austria) Jetalliance Racing	(Austria) Lukas Lichtner-Hoyer (Germany) Alex Müller	Aston Martin DBR9	MI	79
2	GT1	36	(Austria) Jetalliance Racing	(Austria) Lukas Lichtner-Hoyer (Germany) Alex Müller	Aston Martin 6.0 L V12	MI	79
3	GT1	5	(Germany) Phoenix Carsport Racing	(Switzerland) Jean-Denis Délétraz (Switzerland) Marcel Fässler	Chevrolet Corvette C6.R	MI	79
3	GT1	5	(Germany) Phoenix Carsport Racing	(Switzerland) Jean-Denis Délétraz (Switzerland) Marcel Fässler	Chevrolet LS7R 7.0 L V8	MI	79
4	GT1	2	(Germany) Vitaphone Racing Team	(Portugal) Miguel Ramos (Brazil) Alexandre Negrão	Maserati MC12 GT1	MI	79
4	GT1	2	(Germany) Vitaphone Racing Team	(Portugal) Miguel Ramos (Brazil) Alexandre Negrão	Maserati 6.0 L V12	MI	79
5	GT1	1	(Germany) Vitaphone Racing Team	(Germany) Michael Bartels (Italy) Andrea Bertolini	Maserati MC12 GT1	MI	79
5	GT1	1	(Germany) Vitaphone Racing Team	(Germany) Michael Bartels (Italy) Andrea Bertolini	Maserati 6.0 L V12	MI	79
6	GT1	6	(Germany) Phoenix Carsport Racing	(Netherlands) Mike Hezemans (Italy) Fabrizio Gollin	Chevrolet Corvette C6.R	MI	79
6	GT1	6	(Germany) Phoenix Carsport Racing	(Netherlands) Mike Hezemans (Italy) Fabrizio Gollin	Chevrolet LS7R 7.0 L V8	MI	79
7	GT1	3	(Belgium) Selleslagh Racing Team	(France) Christophe Bouchut (Netherlands) Xavier Maassen	Chevrolet Corvette C6.R	MI	79
7	GT1	3	(Belgium) Selleslagh Racing Team	(France) Christophe Bouchut (Netherlands) Xavier Maassen	Chevrolet LS7R 7.0 L V8	MI	79
8	GT1	7	(France) Larbre Compétition	(Belgium) Vincent Vosse (Belgium) Grégory Franchi	Saleen S7-R	MI	78
8	GT1	7	(France) Larbre Compétition	(Belgium) Vincent Vosse (Belgium) Grégory Franchi	Ford 7.0 L V8	MI	78
9	GT1	15	(Monaco) JMB Racing	(France) Alain Ferté (United Kingdom) Ben Aucott	Maserati MC12 GT1	MI	78
9	GT1	15	(Monaco) JMB Racing	(France) Alain Ferté (United Kingdom) Ben Aucott	Maserati 6.0 L V12	MI	78
10	GT1	4	(Belgium) Peka Racing	(Belgium) Anthony Kumpen (Belgium) Bert Longin	Saleen S7-R	P	78
10	GT1	4	(Belgium) Peka Racing	(Belgium) Anthony Kumpen (Belgium) Bert Longin	Ford 7.0 L V8	P	78
11	**GT2**	**50**	**(Italy) AF Corse**	**(Italy) Gianmaria Bruni (Finland) Toni Vilander**	**Ferrari F430 GT2**	MI	**77**
11	**GT2**	**50**	**(Italy) AF Corse**	**(Italy) Gianmaria Bruni (Finland) Toni Vilander**	**Ferrari 4.0 L V8**	MI	**77**
12	GT2	51	(Italy) AF Corse	(Italy) Thomas Biagi (San Marino) Christian Montanari	Ferrari F430 GT2	MI	77
12	GT2	51	(Italy) AF Corse	(Italy) Thomas Biagi (San Marino) Christian Montanari	Ferrari 4.0 L V8	MI	77
13	GT2	56	(United Kingdom) CR Scuderia Racing	(United Kingdom) Andrew Kirkaldy (United Kingdom) Rob Bell	Ferrari F430 GT2	MI	77
13	GT2	56	(United Kingdom) CR Scuderia Racing	(United Kingdom) Andrew Kirkaldy (United Kingdom) Rob Bell	Ferrari 4.0 L V8	MI	77
14	GT2	61	(Belgium) Prospeed Competition	(Germany) Emmanuel Collard (United Kingdom) Richard Westbrook	Porsche 997 GT3-RSR	MI	76
14	GT2	61	(Belgium) Prospeed Competition	(Germany) Emmanuel Collard (United Kingdom) Richard Westbrook	Porsche 4.0 L Flat-6	MI	76
15	GT2	78	(Italy) BMS Scuderia Italia	(Switzerland) Joël Camathias (Italy) Davide Rigon	Ferrari F430 GT2	P	76
15	GT2	78	(Italy) BMS Scuderia Italia	(Switzerland) Joël Camathias (Italy) Davide Rigon	Ferrari 4.0 L V8	P	76
16	GT2	95	(Italy) Advanced Engineering (Argentina) PeCom Racing Team	(Argentina) Matías Russo (Argentina) Luís Pérez Companc	Ferrari F430 GT2	MI	76
16	GT2	95	(Italy) Advanced Engineering (Argentina) PeCom Racing Team	(Argentina) Matías Russo (Argentina) Luís Pérez Companc	Ferrari 4.0 L V8	MI	76
17	GT2	57	(Switzerland) Kessel Racing	(Switzerland) Henri Moser (Italy) Fabrizio del Monte	Ferrari F430 GT2	MI	76
17	GT2	57	(Switzerland) Kessel Racing	(Switzerland) Henri Moser (Italy) Fabrizio del Monte	Ferrari 4.0 L V8	MI	76
18	GT2	77	(Italy) BMS Scuderia Italia	(Italy) Paolo Ruberti (Italy) Matteo Malucelli	Ferrari F430 GT2	P	76
18	GT2	77	(Italy) BMS Scuderia Italia	(Italy) Paolo Ruberti (Italy) Matteo Malucelli	Ferrari 4.0 L V8	P	76
19	GT2	60	(Belgium) Prospeed Competition	(Finland) Markus Palttala (Finland) Mikael Forsten	Porsche 997 GT3-RSR	MI	76
19	GT2	60	(Belgium) Prospeed Competition	(Finland) Markus Palttala (Finland) Mikael Forsten	Porsche 4.0 L Flat-6	MI	76
20	GT2	62	(United Kingdom) Scuderia Ecosse	(United Kingdom) Jamie Davies (Italy) Fabio Babini	Ferrari F430 GT2	P	75
20	GT2	62	(United Kingdom) Scuderia Ecosse	(United Kingdom) Jamie Davies (Italy) Fabio Babini	Ferrari 4.0 L V8	P	75
21	GT2	55	(United Kingdom) CR Scuderia Racing	(Canada) Chris Niarchos (United Kingdom) Tim Mullen	Ferrari F430 GT2	MI	73
21	GT2	55	(United Kingdom) CR Scuderia Racing	(Canada) Chris Niarchos (United Kingdom) Tim Mullen	Ferrari 4.0 L V8	MI	73
22	GT2	59	(United Kingdom) Trackspeed Racing	(United Kingdom) Richard Williams (United Kingdom) David Ashburn	Porsche 997 GT3-RSR	P	70
22	GT2	59	(United Kingdom) Trackspeed Racing	(United Kingdom) Richard Williams (United Kingdom) David Ashburn	Porsche 3.8 L Flat-6	P	70
23 DNF	G2	104	(Germany) Go To One Racing (Czech Republic) Charouz Racing System	(Czech Republic) Štepán Vojtech (Germany) Kenneth Heyer	Mosler MT900R	MI	67
23 DNF	G2	104	(Germany) Go To One Racing (Czech Republic) Charouz Racing System	(Czech Republic) Štepán Vojtech (Germany) Kenneth Heyer	Chevrolet LS7 7.0 L V8	MI	67
24 DNF	GT1	37	Escuderia ACA Argentina	(Argentina) José María López (Argentina) Martín Basso	Ferrari 550-GTS Maranello	MI	60
24 DNF	GT1	37	Escuderia ACA Argentina	(Argentina) José María López (Argentina) Martín Basso	Ferrari 5.9 L V12	MI	60
25 DNF	G2	103	(Germany) Go To One Racing (Czech Republic) Charouz Racing System	(Czech Republic) Aleš Jirásek (Czech Republic) Adam Lacko	Mosler MT900R	MI	13
25 DNF	G2	103	(Germany) Go To One Racing (Czech Republic) Charouz Racing System	(Czech Republic) Aleš Jirásek (Czech Republic) Adam Lacko	Chevrolet LS7 7.0 L V8	MI	13
26 DNF	GT1; C	12	(Austria) AT Racing (Austria) Renauer Motorsport Team	(Belarus) Alexander Talkanitsa (Germany) Wolfgang Kaufmann	Chevrolet Corvette C5-R	MI	8
26 DNF	GT1; C	12	(Austria) AT Racing (Austria) Renauer Motorsport Team	(Belarus) Alexander Talkanitsa (Germany) Wolfgang Kaufmann	Chevrolet LS7R 7.0 L V8	MI	8
DNS	GT1	10	(United Kingdom) Gigawave Motorsport	(Austria) Philipp Peter (Denmark) Allan Simonsen	Aston Martin DBR9	MI	–
DNS	GT1	10	(United Kingdom) Gigawave Motorsport	(Austria) Philipp Peter (Denmark) Allan Simonsen	Aston Martin 6.0 L V12	MI	–
DNQ	G2	101	(Belgium) Belgian Racing	(Belgium) Bas Leinders (Belgium) Renaud Kuppens	Gillet Vertigo Streiff	P	–
DNQ	G2	101	(Belgium) Belgian Racing	(Belgium) Bas Leinders (Belgium) Renaud Kuppens	Maserati 4.2 L V8	P	–

== Statistics ==
- Pole Position – #33 Jetalliance Racing – 1:23.748
- Average Speed – 145.01 km/h

FIA GT Championship
Previous race: 2008 FIA GT Adria 2 Hours	2008 season	Next race: 2008 Spa 24 Hours
