= 2008 FIA GT Championship =

Motor racing season

Seasons
- ← 2007 2009 →

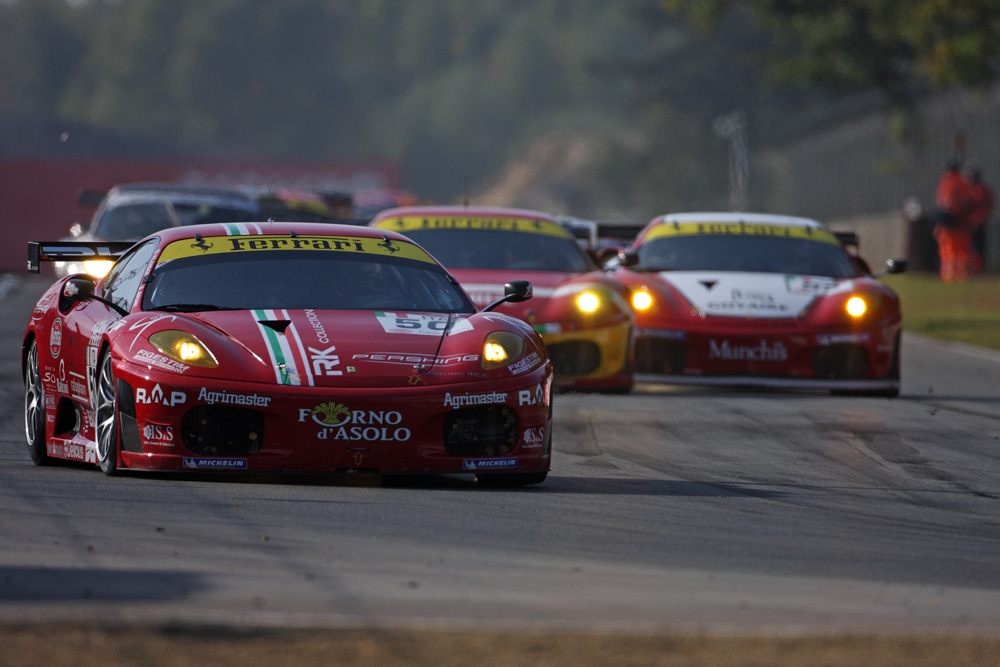
The AF Corse entered Ferrari F430 GT2 of Gianmaria Bruni & Toni Vilander at the Zolder round of the championship. AF Corse won the GT2 Teams title and Bruni & Vilander won the GT2 Drivers award.

The 2008 FIA GT Championship season was the twelfth season of the FIA GT Championship. It featured a series for Grand Touring style cars broken into two classes based on power and manufacturer involvement, called GT1 and GT2. Invitational G2 and G3 classes were also allowed to participate but cars in these classes were not eligible to score points. The Championship began on 20 April 2008 and ended on 23 November 2008 after 10 races.

== Schedule ==
The official 2008 calendar was released by the FIA on 24 October 2007. All races were two hours, with exception of the Spa 24 Hours and the Bucharest City Challenge, the latter being a combination of two one-hour races, each awarding half points. The Adria round remained as a night event and the Argentinian finale was the first South American race in FIA GT Championship history.

Rnd	Race	Circuit	Date
1	(United Kingdom) RAC Tourist Trophy	Silverstone Circuit	20 April
2	(Italy) Monza 2 Hours	Autodromo Nazionale Monza	18 May
3	(Italy) Adria 2 Hours	Adria International Raceway	21 June
4	(Germany) Oschersleben 2 Hours	Motorsport Arena Oschersleben	6 July
5	(Belgium) Total 24 Hours of Spa	Circuit de Spa-Francorchamps	2 August; 3 August
6	(Romania) Bucharest City Challenge	Bucharest Ring	23 August; 24 August
7	(Czech Republic) Brno 2 Hours	Masaryk Circuit	14 September
8	(France) Nogaro 2 Hours	Circuit Paul Armagnac	5 October
9	(Belgium) Zolder 2 Hours	Circuit Zolder	19 October
10	(Argentina) San Luis 2 Hours	Potrero de los Funes Circuit	23 November

== Entries ==
=== GT1 ===
A † symbol and gray background denotes an entry and driver competing in the Citation Cup.

Entrant	Car	Engine	Tyre	No.	Drivers	Rounds
(Germany) Vitaphone Racing Team	Maserati MC12 GT1	Maserati 6.0 L V12	M	1	(Germany) Michael Bartels	All
(Germany) Vitaphone Racing Team	Maserati MC12 GT1	Maserati 6.0 L V12	M	1	(Italy) Andrea Bertolini	All
(Germany) Vitaphone Racing Team	Maserati MC12 GT1	Maserati 6.0 L V12	M	1	(France) Stéphane Sarrazin	5
(Germany) Vitaphone Racing Team	Maserati MC12 GT1	Maserati 6.0 L V12	M	1	(Belgium) Eric van de Poele	5
(Germany) Vitaphone Racing Team	Maserati MC12 GT1	Maserati 6.0 L V12	M	2	(Brazil) Alexandre Negrão	All
(Germany) Vitaphone Racing Team	Maserati MC12 GT1	Maserati 6.0 L V12	M	2	(Portugal) Miguel Ramos	All
(Germany) Vitaphone Racing Team	Maserati MC12 GT1	Maserati 6.0 L V12	M	2	(Belgium) Stéphane Lémeret	5
(Germany) Vitaphone Racing Team	Maserati MC12 GT1	Maserati 6.0 L V12	M	2	(Italy) Alessandro Pier Guidi	5
(Germany) Team Vitasystems	Maserati MC12 GT1	Maserati 6.0 L V12	M	17	(Portugal) Pedro Lamy	9
(Germany) Team Vitasystems	Maserati MC12 GT1	Maserati 6.0 L V12	M	17	(Italy) Matteo Bobbi	9
(Belgium) Selleslagh Racing Team	Chevrolet Corvette C6.R	Chevrolet LS7.R 7.0 L V8	M	3	(France) Christophe Bouchut	1–9
(Belgium) Selleslagh Racing Team	Chevrolet Corvette C6.R	Chevrolet LS7.R 7.0 L V8	M	3	(Netherlands) Xavier Maassen	1–9
(Belgium) Selleslagh Racing Team	Chevrolet Corvette C6.R	Chevrolet LS7.R 7.0 L V8	M	3	(Belgium) Maxime Soulet	5, 10
(Belgium) Selleslagh Racing Team	Chevrolet Corvette C6.R	Chevrolet LS7.R 7.0 L V8	M	3	(Switzerland) Christophe Pillon	5
(Belgium) Selleslagh Racing Team	Chevrolet Corvette C6.R	Chevrolet LS7.R 7.0 L V8	M	3	(Belgium) Armand Fumal	10
(Belgium) Selleslagh Racing Team	Chevrolet Corvette C6.R	Chevrolet LS7.R 7.0 L V8	M	3	(Argentina) Christian Ledesma	10
(Belgium) PekaRacing nv	Saleen S7-R	Ford 7.0 L V8	P	4	(Belgium) Anthony Kumpen	All
(Belgium) PekaRacing nv	Saleen S7-R	Ford 7.0 L V8	P	4	(Belgium) Bert Longin	All
(Belgium) PekaRacing nv	Saleen S7-R	Ford 7.0 L V8	P	4	(Belgium) Fredy Bouvy	5
(Belgium) PekaRacing nv	Saleen S7-R	Ford 7.0 L V8	P	4	(Belgium) Kurt Mollekens	5
(Germany) Phoenix Carsport Racing	Chevrolet Corvette C6.R	Chevrolet LS7.R 7.0 L V8	M	5	(Switzerland) Marcel Fässler	1–4, 6–10
(Germany) Phoenix Carsport Racing	Chevrolet Corvette C6.R	Chevrolet LS7.R 7.0 L V8	M	5	(Switzerland) Jean-Denis Délétraz	1–4, 6–9
(Germany) Phoenix Carsport Racing	Chevrolet Corvette C6.R	Chevrolet LS7.R 7.0 L V8	M	5	(Greece) Alexandros Margaritis	5
(Germany) Phoenix Carsport Racing	Chevrolet Corvette C6.R	Chevrolet LS7.R 7.0 L V8	M	5	(Netherlands) Jos Menten	5
(Germany) Phoenix Carsport Racing	Chevrolet Corvette C6.R	Chevrolet LS7.R 7.0 L V8	M	5	(Germany) Robert Schlünssen	5
(Germany) Phoenix Carsport Racing	Chevrolet Corvette C6.R	Chevrolet LS7.R 7.0 L V8	M	5	(Germany) Uwe Alzen	5
(Germany) Phoenix Carsport Racing	Chevrolet Corvette C6.R	Chevrolet LS7.R 7.0 L V8	M	5	(Argentina) Ricardo Risatti	10
(Germany) Phoenix Carsport Racing	Chevrolet Corvette C6.R	Chevrolet LS7.R 7.0 L V8	M	6	(Netherlands) Mike Hezemans	All
(Germany) Phoenix Carsport Racing	Chevrolet Corvette C6.R	Chevrolet LS7.R 7.0 L V8	M	6	(Italy) Fabrizio Gollin	All
(Germany) Phoenix Carsport Racing	Chevrolet Corvette C6.R	Chevrolet LS7.R 7.0 L V8	M	6	(Switzerland) Marcel Fässler	5
(Germany) Phoenix Carsport Racing	Chevrolet Corvette C6.R	Chevrolet LS7.R 7.0 L V8	M	6	(Switzerland) Jean-Denis Délétraz	5
(France) Larbre Compétition	Saleen S7-R	Ford 7.0 L V8	M	7	(Belgium) Grégory Franchi	1–5, 8–9
(France) Larbre Compétition	Saleen S7-R	Ford 7.0 L V8	M	7	(Belgium) Vincent Vosse	1–5, 8–9
(France) Larbre Compétition	Saleen S7-R	Ford 7.0 L V8	M	7	(Portugal) Pedro Lamy	5
(France) Larbre Compétition	Saleen S7-R	Ford 7.0 L V8	M	7	(Switzerland) Steve Zacchia	5
(France) Larbre Compétition	Saleen S7-R	Ford 7.0 L V8	M	7	(France) Frédéric Makowiecki	10
(France) Larbre Compétition	Saleen S7-R	Ford 7.0 L V8	M	7	(France) Roland Bervillé	10
(Germany) IPB Spartak Reiter Engineering	Lamborghini Murciélago R-GT	Lamborghini 6.0 L V12	M	8	(Russia) Roman Rusinov	1–2, 5–6
(Germany) IPB Spartak Reiter Engineering	Lamborghini Murciélago R-GT	Lamborghini 6.0 L V12	M	8	(Netherlands) Peter Kox	1–2, 5–6
(Germany) IPB Spartak Reiter Engineering	Lamborghini Murciélago R-GT	Lamborghini 6.0 L V12	M	8	(Netherlands) Jan Lammers	5
(Germany) IPB Spartak Reiter Engineering	Lamborghini Murciélago R-GT	Lamborghini 6.0 L V12	M	8	(Czech Republic) Tomáš Enge	5
(Belgium) DKR Engineering	Chevrolet Corvette C6.R	Chevrolet LS7.R 7.0 L V8	P	9	(France) Julien Canal	8
(Belgium) DKR Engineering	Chevrolet Corvette C6.R	Chevrolet LS7.R 7.0 L V8	P	9	(France) Jean-Philippe Dayraut	8
(United Kingdom) Gigawave Motorsport	Aston Martin DBR9	Aston Martin 6.0 L V12	M	10	(Austria) Philipp Peter	All
(United Kingdom) Gigawave Motorsport	Aston Martin DBR9	Aston Martin 6.0 L V12	M	10	(Denmark) Allan Simonsen	All
(United Kingdom) Gigawave Motorsport	Aston Martin DBR9	Aston Martin 6.0 L V12	M	10	(United Kingdom) Darren Turner	5
(United Kingdom) Gigawave Motorsport	Aston Martin DBR9	Aston Martin 6.0 L V12	M	10	(United Kingdom) Andrew Thompson	5
(Austria) AT Racing	Chevrolet Corvette C5-R	Chevrolet LS7.R 7.0 L V8	M	12†	(Belarus) Alexander Talkanitsa	1–4, 7
(Austria) AT Racing	Chevrolet Corvette C5-R	Chevrolet LS7.R 7.0 L V8	M	12†	(Germany) Wolfgang Kaufmann	1–4, 7
(Austria) Team Rbimmo / B-Racing	Saleen S7-R	Ford 7.0 L V8	P	13	(Italy) Andrea Piccini	1–3, 7
(Austria) Team Rbimmo / B-Racing	Saleen S7-R	Ford 7.0 L V8	P	13	(Netherlands) Jos Menten	1–3
(Austria) Team Rbimmo / B-Racing	Saleen S7-R	Ford 7.0 L V8	P	13	(Austria) Bernhard Auinger	7
(Monaco) JMB Racing	Maserati MC12 GT1	Maserati 6.0 L V12	M	15	(United Kingdom) Ben Aucott	1–5
(Monaco) JMB Racing	Maserati MC12 GT1	Maserati 6.0 L V12	M	15	(Netherlands) Peter Kutemann	1
(Monaco) JMB Racing	Maserati MC12 GT1	Maserati 6.0 L V12	M	15	(France) Stéphane Daoudi	2, 5
(Monaco) JMB Racing	Maserati MC12 GT1	Maserati 6.0 L V12	M	15	(France) Alain Ferté	3–5
(Switzerland) Kessel Racing	Ferrari 575 GTC	Ferrari F133 GT 6.0 L V12	M	21†	(Switzerland) Loris Kessel	2
(Switzerland) Kessel Racing	Ferrari 575 GTC	Ferrari F133 GT 6.0 L V12	M	21†	(Switzerland) Andrea Chiesa	2
(Italy) Lanza Motorsport	Chrysler Viper GTS-R	Chrysler 356-T6 8.0 L V10	M	22†	(Italy) Maurizio Strada	2
(Italy) Lanza Motorsport	Chrysler Viper GTS-R	Chrysler 356-T6 8.0 L V10	M	22†	(Italy) Massimo Morini	2
(Italy) Lanza Motorsport	Chrysler Viper GTS-R	Chrysler 356-T6 8.0 L V10	M	22†	(Italy) Mauro Simoncini	2
(Austria) Jetalliance Racing	Aston Martin DBR9	Aston Martin 6.0 L V12	M	33	(Austria) Karl Wendlinger	1–9
(Austria) Jetalliance Racing	Aston Martin DBR9	Aston Martin 6.0 L V12	M	33	(United Kingdom) Ryan Sharp	1–9
(Austria) Jetalliance Racing	Aston Martin DBR9	Aston Martin 6.0 L V12	M	33	(Austria) Lukas Lichtner-Hoyer	5
(Austria) Jetalliance Racing	Aston Martin DBR9	Aston Martin 6.0 L V12	M	33	(Germany) Alex Müller	5
(Austria) Jetalliance Racing	Aston Martin DBR9	Aston Martin 6.0 L V12	M	36	(Germany) Alex Müller	1–4, 6–8
(Austria) Jetalliance Racing	Aston Martin DBR9	Aston Martin 6.0 L V12	M	36	(Austria) Lukas Lichtner-Hoyer	1–4, 6–7
(Austria) Jetalliance Racing	Aston Martin DBR9	Aston Martin 6.0 L V12	M	36	(Czech Republic) Jiří Janák	8
ACA Argentina	Ferrari 550-GTS Maranello	Ferrari F133 5.9 L V12	M	37	(Argentina) Esteban Tuero	1–3, 7–8, 10
ACA Argentina	Ferrari 550-GTS Maranello	Ferrari F133 5.9 L V12	M	37	(Argentina) Gastón Mazzacane	1–2, 8
ACA Argentina	Ferrari 550-GTS Maranello	Ferrari F133 5.9 L V12	M	37	(Argentina) José María López	3–4, 9–10
ACA Argentina	Ferrari 550-GTS Maranello	Ferrari F133 5.9 L V12	M	37	(Argentina) Martín Basso	4, 7, 9
ACA Argentina	Ferrari 550-GTS Maranello	Ferrari F133 5.9 L V12	M	38	(Argentina) Gastón Mazzacane	10
ACA Argentina	Ferrari 550-GTS Maranello	Ferrari F133 5.9 L V12	M	38	(Argentina) Martín Basso	10
(Slovakia) ARC Bratislava (Note: ARC Bratislava's entry was classified as Group 2 (G2) instead of GT1, making it ineligible for the FIA GT1 driver or team championships, however the entry was deemed eligible for the Citation Cup for drivers of GT1 cars.)	Saleen S7-R	Ford 7.0 L V8	M	111†	(Slovakia) Miroslav Konôpka	1–2
(Slovakia) ARC Bratislava	Saleen S7-R	Ford 7.0 L V8	M	111†	(United Kingdom) Sean Edwards	1–2

=== GT2 ===
Entrant	Car	Engine	Tyre	No.	Drivers	Rounds
(Italy) AF Corse	Ferrari F430 GTC	Ferrari 4.3 L V8	M	50	(Italy) Gianmaria Bruni	All
(Italy) AF Corse	Ferrari F430 GTC	Ferrari 4.3 L V8	M	50	(Finland) Toni Vilander	All
(Italy) AF Corse	Ferrari F430 GTC	Ferrari 4.3 L V8	M	50	(Finland) Mika Salo	5
(Italy) AF Corse	Ferrari F430 GTC	Ferrari 4.3 L V8	M	50	(Brazil) Jaime Melo	5
(Italy) AF Corse	Ferrari F430 GTC	Ferrari 4.3 L V8	M	51	(Italy) Thomas Biagi	All
(Italy) AF Corse	Ferrari F430 GTC	Ferrari 4.3 L V8	M	51	(San Marino) Christian Montanari	All
(Italy) AF Corse	Ferrari F430 GTC	Ferrari 4.3 L V8	M	51	(Argentina) Matías Russo	5
(Italy) AF Corse	Ferrari F430 GTC	Ferrari 4.3 L V8	M	51	(Germany) Dominik Farnbacher	5
(Italy) Advanced Engineering Pecom Racing Team	Ferrari F430 GTC	Ferrari 4.3 L V8	M	95	(Argentina) Matías Russo	1–4, 6–10
(Italy) Advanced Engineering Pecom Racing Team	Ferrari F430 GTC	Ferrari 4.3 L V8	M	95	(Argentina) Luís Pérez Companc	1–4, 6–10
(United Kingdom) CR Scuderia	Ferrari F430 GTC	Ferrari 4.3 L V8	M	55	(United Kingdom) Tim Mullen	All
(United Kingdom) CR Scuderia	Ferrari F430 GTC	Ferrari 4.3 L V8	M	55	(Canada) Chris Niarchos	1, 3–7, 10
(United Kingdom) CR Scuderia	Ferrari F430 GTC	Ferrari 4.3 L V8	M	55	(United Kingdom) Tim Sugden	2
(United Kingdom) CR Scuderia	Ferrari F430 GTC	Ferrari 4.3 L V8	M	55	(United Kingdom) Gordon Shedden	5
(United Kingdom) CR Scuderia	Ferrari F430 GTC	Ferrari 4.3 L V8	M	55	(Italy) Andrea Piccini	5, 8
(United Kingdom) CR Scuderia	Ferrari F430 GTC	Ferrari 4.3 L V8	M	55	(United Kingdom) James Sutton	9
(United Kingdom) CR Scuderia	Ferrari F430 GTC	Ferrari 4.3 L V8	M	56	(United Kingdom) Andrew Kirkaldy	All
(United Kingdom) CR Scuderia	Ferrari F430 GTC	Ferrari 4.3 L V8	M	56	(United Kingdom) Rob Bell	1–6, 8–10
(United Kingdom) CR Scuderia	Ferrari F430 GTC	Ferrari 4.3 L V8	M	56	(United Kingdom) James Sutton	5
(United Kingdom) CR Scuderia	Ferrari F430 GTC	Ferrari 4.3 L V8	M	56	(Germany) Dirk Müller	5, 7
(Switzerland) Kessel Racing	Ferrari F430 GTC	Ferrari 4.3 L V8	M	57	(Switzerland) Henri Moser	All
(Switzerland) Kessel Racing	Ferrari F430 GTC	Ferrari 4.3 L V8	M	57	(Italy) Fabrizio Del Monte	1–7
(Switzerland) Kessel Racing	Ferrari F430 GTC	Ferrari 4.3 L V8	M	57	(France) Gilles Vannelet	5
(Switzerland) Kessel Racing	Ferrari F430 GTC	Ferrari 4.3 L V8	M	57	(Italy) Andrea Palma	5
(Switzerland) Kessel Racing	Ferrari F430 GTC	Ferrari 4.3 L V8	M	57	(Italy) Maurizio Mediani	8
(Switzerland) Kessel Racing	Ferrari F430 GTC	Ferrari 4.3 L V8	M	57	(Italy) Marcello Zani	9
(Switzerland) Kessel Racing	Ferrari F430 GTC	Ferrari 4.3 L V8	M	57	(Italy) Niki Cadei	10
(United Kingdom) Trackspeed Racing	Porsche 911 GT3 RSR	Porsche 3.8 L Flat-6	P	59	(United Kingdom) Richard Williams	1–5, 7–8, 10
(United Kingdom) Trackspeed Racing	Porsche 911 GT3 RSR	Porsche 3.8 L Flat-6	P	59	(United Kingdom) David Ashburn	1–5, 7–8, 10
(United Kingdom) Trackspeed Racing	Porsche 911 GT3 RSR	Porsche 3.8 L Flat-6	P	59	(United Kingdom) Tim Sugden	5
(United Kingdom) Trackspeed Racing	Porsche 911 GT3 RSR	Porsche 3.8 L Flat-6	P	59	(France) Xavier Pompidou	5
(Belgium) Prospeed Competition	Porsche 911 GT3 RSR	Porsche 3.8 L Flat-6	M	60	(Finland) Markus Palttala	All
(Belgium) Prospeed Competition	Porsche 911 GT3 RSR	Porsche 3.8 L Flat-6	M	60	(Finland) Mikael Forsten	1–8, 10
(Belgium) Prospeed Competition	Porsche 911 GT3 RSR	Porsche 3.8 L Flat-6	M	60	(Germany) Wolf Henzler	5
(Belgium) Prospeed Competition	Porsche 911 GT3 RSR	Porsche 3.8 L Flat-6	M	60	(Belgium) Geoffroy Horion	5
(Belgium) Prospeed Competition	Porsche 911 GT3 RSR	Porsche 3.8 L Flat-6	M	60	(Germany) Marc Lieb	9
(Belgium) Prospeed Competition	Porsche 911 GT3 RSR	Porsche 3.8 L Flat-6	M	61	(United Kingdom) Richard Westbrook	All
(Belgium) Prospeed Competition	Porsche 911 GT3 RSR	Porsche 3.8 L Flat-6	M	61	(France) Emmanuel Collard	1–7, 9–10
(Belgium) Prospeed Competition	Porsche 911 GT3 RSR	Porsche 3.8 L Flat-6	M	61	(Germany) Marc Lieb	5
(Belgium) Prospeed Competition	Porsche 911 GT3 RSR	Porsche 3.8 L Flat-6	M	61	(Australia) Alex Davison	8
(United Kingdom) Scuderia Ecosse	Ferrari F430 GTC	Ferrari 4.3 L V8	P	62	(United Kingdom) Jamie Davies	All
(United Kingdom) Scuderia Ecosse	Ferrari F430 GTC	Ferrari 4.3 L V8	P	62	(Italy) Fabio Babini	All
(United Kingdom) Scuderia Ecosse	Ferrari F430 GTC	Ferrari 4.3 L V8	P	62	(Italy) Ferdinando Monfardini	5
(Germany) Team Felbermayr-Proton	Porsche 911 GT3 RSR	Porsche 3.8 L Flat-6	M	66	(Germany) Marc Lieb	6
(Germany) Team Felbermayr-Proton	Porsche 911 GT3 RSR	Porsche 3.8 L Flat-6	M	66	(Austria) Horst Felbermayr Jr.	6
(Germany) Team Felbermayr-Proton	Porsche 911 GT3 RSR	Porsche 3.8 L Flat-6	M	69	(Austria) Richard Lietz	6
(Germany) Team Felbermayr-Proton	Porsche 911 GT3 RSR	Porsche 3.8 L Flat-6	M	69	(Austria) Horst Felbermayr	6
(Italy) Easy Race SRL	Ferrari F430 GTC	Ferrari 4.3 L V8	P	70	(Italy) Maurice Basso	5
(Italy) Easy Race SRL	Ferrari F430 GTC	Ferrari 4.3 L V8	P	70	(Italy) Paolo Tenchini	5
(Italy) Easy Race SRL	Ferrari F430 GTC	Ferrari 4.3 L V8	P	70	(Italy) Roberto Plati	5
(Italy) Easy Race SRL	Ferrari F430 GTC	Ferrari 4.3 L V8	P	70	(Belgium) Bertrand Baguette	5
(Australia) Juniper Racing	Porsche 911 GT3 RSR	Porsche 3.8 L Flat-6	M	75	(New Zealand) Craig Baird	5
(Australia) Juniper Racing	Porsche 911 GT3 RSR	Porsche 3.8 L Flat-6	M	75	(Australia) Shaun Juniper	5
(Australia) Juniper Racing	Porsche 911 GT3 RSR	Porsche 3.8 L Flat-6	M	75	(Australia) Max Twigg	5
(Australia) Juniper Racing	Porsche 911 GT3 RSR	Porsche 3.8 L Flat-6	M	75	(Australia) Rodney Forbes	5
(France) IMSA Performance Matmut	Porsche 911 GT3 RSR	Porsche 3.8 L Flat-6	M	76	(France) Raymond Narac	5
(France) IMSA Performance Matmut	Porsche 911 GT3 RSR	Porsche 3.8 L Flat-6	M	76	(Austria) Richard Lietz	5
(France) IMSA Performance Matmut	Porsche 911 GT3 RSR	Porsche 3.8 L Flat-6	M	76	(United States) Patrick Long	5
(Italy) BMS Scuderia Italia	Ferrari F430 GTC	Ferrari 4.3 L V8	P	77	(Italy) Paolo Ruberti	All
(Italy) BMS Scuderia Italia	Ferrari F430 GTC	Ferrari 4.3 L V8	P	77	(Italy) Matteo Malucelli	All
(Italy) BMS Scuderia Italia	Ferrari F430 GTC	Ferrari 4.3 L V8	P	77	(Italy) Davide Rigon	5
(Italy) BMS Scuderia Italia	Ferrari F430 GTC	Ferrari 4.3 L V8	P	77	(Switzerland) Joël Camathias	5
(Italy) BMS Scuderia Italia	Ferrari F430 GTC	Ferrari 4.3 L V8	P	78	(Switzerland) Joël Camathias	1–4, 6–10
(Italy) BMS Scuderia Italia	Ferrari F430 GTC	Ferrari 4.3 L V8	P	78	(Italy) Davide Rigon	1–4, 6–7
(Italy) BMS Scuderia Italia	Ferrari F430 GTC	Ferrari 4.3 L V8	P	78	(Argentina) José Manuel Balbiani	8–10
(Czech Republic) K plus K Motorsport	Porsche 911 GT3 RSR	Porsche 3.8 L Flat-6	M	79	(Czech Republic) Jiří Janák	7
(Czech Republic) K plus K Motorsport	Porsche 911 GT3 RSR	Porsche 3.8 L Flat-6	M	79	(Germany) Tim Bergmeister	7
(Slovakia) ARC Bratislava	Porsche 911 GT3 RSR	Porsche 3.8 L Flat-6	M	88	(Slovakia) Miroslav Konôpka	7
(Slovakia) ARC Bratislava	Porsche 911 GT3 RSR	Porsche 3.8 L Flat-6	M	88	(Australia) Karl Reindler	7
(Italy) Victor Racing	Porsche 911 GT3 RSR	Porsche 3.8 L Flat-6	M	99	(Italy) Victor Coggiola	2
(Italy) Victor Racing	Porsche 911 GT3 RSR	Porsche 3.8 L Flat-6	M	99	(Italy) Giovanni Coggiola	2
(Italy) Victor Racing	Porsche 911 GT3 RSR	Porsche 3.8 L Flat-6	M	99	(Italy) Giorgio Coggiola	2

== Team & driver changes ==
- BMS Scuderia Italia entered two Ferrari F430 GT2's, replacing the sole Porsche 997 GT3-RSR
- Gigawave Motorsport contested the full season in 2008 running one Aston Martin DBR9 driven by Allan Simonsen and Philipp Peter. Gigawave also entered one Aston Martin V8 Vantage GT2 in the GT2 class.
- A new team, CR Scuderia, entered two Ferrari F430 GT2's in the GT2 class, driven by Chris Niarchos, Andrew Kirkaldy, Rob Bell, and Tim Mullen.
- PK Carsport replaced their sole Corvette C5-R with a Saleen S7-R.

== Season results ==
Overall winners in bold.

Rnd	Circuit	GT1 Winning Team	GT2 Winning Team	Results
Rnd	Circuit	GT1 Winning Drivers	GT2 Winning Drivers	Results
1	Silverstone	**(Austria) #33 Jetalliance Racing**	(Italy) #50 AF Corse	Results
1	Silverstone	(Austria) **Karl Wendlinger** (United Kingdom) **Ryan Sharp**	(Italy) Gianmaria Bruni (Finland) Toni Vilander	Results
2	Monza	**(Belgium) #3 Selleslagh Racing Team**	(Belgium) #61 Prospeed Competition	Results
2	Monza	(France) **Christophe Bouchut** (Netherlands) **Xavier Maassen**	(France) Emmanuel Collard (United Kingdom) Richard Westbrook	Results
3	Adria	**(Germany) #6 Phoenix Carsport**	(Italy) #50 AF Corse	Results
3	Adria	(Netherlands) **Mike Hezemans** (Italy) **Fabrizio Gollin**	(Italy) Gianmaria Bruni (Finland) Toni Vilander	Results
4	Oschersleben	**(Austria) #33 Jetalliance Racing**	(Italy) #50 AF Corse	Results
4	Oschersleben	(Austria) **Karl Wendlinger** (United Kingdom) **Ryan Sharp**	(Italy) Gianmaria Bruni (Finland) Toni Vilander	Results
5	Spa-Francorchamps	**(Germany) #1 Vitaphone Racing Team**	(Italy) #77 BMS Scuderia Italia	Results
5	Spa-Francorchamps	(Germany) **Michael Bartels** (Italy) **Andrea Bertolini** (Belgium) **Eric van de Poele** (France) **Stéphane Sarrazin**	(Italy) Davide Rigon (Italy) Paolo Ruberti (Italy) Matteo Malucelli (Switzerland) Joël Camathias	Results
6	Bucharest	**(Germany) #5 Phoenix Carsport**	(United Kingdom) #56 CR Scuderia Racing	Results
6	Bucharest	(Switzerland) **Jean-Denis Délétraz** (Switzerland) **Marcel Fässler**	(United Kingdom) Andrew Kirkaldy (United Kingdom) Rob Bell	Results
6	Bucharest	**(Germany) #5 Phoenix Carsport**	(United Kingdom) #56 CR Scuderia Racing	Results
6	Bucharest	(Switzerland) **Jean-Denis Délétraz** (Switzerland) **Marcel Fässler**	(United Kingdom) Andrew Kirkaldy (United Kingdom) Rob Bell	Results
7	Brno	**(Austria) #33 Jetalliance Racing**	(Italy) #50 AF Corse	Results
7	Brno	(Austria) **Karl Wendlinger** (United Kingdom) **Ryan Sharp**	(Italy) Gianmaria Bruni (Finland) Toni Vilander	Results
8	Nogaro	**(Germany) #2 Vitaphone Racing Team**	(Belgium) #61 Prospeed Competition	Results
8	Nogaro	(Portugal) **Miguel Ramos** (Brazil) **Alexandre Negrão**	(Australia) Alex Davison (United Kingdom) Richard Westbrook	Results
9	Zolder	**(Germany) #1 Vitaphone Racing Team**	(Italy) #50 AF Corse	Results
9	Zolder	(Germany) **Michael Bartels** (Italy) **Andrea Bertolini**	(Italy) Gianmaria Bruni (Finland) Toni Vilander	Results
10	Potrero de los Funes	**(Belgium) #4 Peka Racing**	(Italy) #95 Advanced Engineering PeCom	Results
10	Potrero de los Funes	(Belgium) **Bert Longin** (Belgium) **Anthony Kumpen**	(Argentina) Luís Pérez Companc (Argentina) Matías Russo	Results

== Drivers championships ==
Points were awarded to the top 8 finishers in the order of 10–8–6–5–4–3–2–1 except at the Spa 24 Hours. Drivers who did not drive the car for a minimum of 35 minutes did not score points.

=== GT1 standings ===
Pos.	Driver	Team	SIL (United Kingdom)	MON (Italy)	ADR (Italy)	OSC (Germany)	SPA (Belgium)			BUC (Romania)		BRN (Czech Republic)	NOG (France)	ZOL (Belgium)	SAN (Argentina)	Total points
Pos.	Driver	Team	SIL (United Kingdom)	MON (Italy)	ADR (Italy)	OSC (Germany)	6H	12H	24H	R1	R2	BRN (Czech Republic)	NOG (France)	ZOL (Belgium)	SAN (Argentina)	Total points
1	(Germany) Michael Bartels	(Germany) Vitaphone Racing Team	2	5	2	5	1	1	1	3	3	6	6	1	5	70
1	(Italy) Andrea Bertolini	(Germany) Vitaphone Racing Team	2	5	2	5	1	1	1	3	3	6	6	1	5	70
2	(Netherlands) Mike Hezemans	(Germany) Phoenix Carsport Racing	5	4	1	6	4	5	Ret	2	Ret	2	2	2	2	66
2	(Italy) Fabrizio Gollin	(Germany) Phoenix Carsport Racing	5	4	1	6	4	5	Ret	2	Ret	2	2	2	2	66
3	(Portugal) Miguel Ramos	(Germany) Vitaphone Racing Team	7	2	10	4	2	2	2	4	2	7	1	6	Ret	52.5
3	(Brazil) Alexandre Negrão	(Germany) Vitaphone Racing Team	7	2	10	4	2	2	2	4	2	7	1	6	Ret	52.5
5	(Switzerland) Marcel Fässler	(Germany) Phoenix Carsport Racing	8	Ret	3	3	4	5	Ret	1	1	4	3	5	6	48.5
6	(Switzerland) Jean-Denis Délétraz	(Germany) Phoenix Carsport Racing	8	Ret	3	3	4	5	Ret	1	1	4	3	5		45.5
7	(Austria) Karl Wendlinger	(Austria) Jetalliance Racing	1	7	Ret	1	5	Ret	Ret	DNS	DNS	1	5	3		44
7	(United Kingdom) Ryan Sharp	(Austria) Jetalliance Racing	1	7	Ret	1	5	Ret	Ret	DNS	DNS	1	5	3		44
8	(Austria) Philipp Peter	(United Kingdom) Gigawave Motorsport	3	3	6	DNS	3	3	3	7	5	Ret	4	4	DNS	40
8	(Denmark) Allan Simonsen	(United Kingdom) Gigawave Motorsport	3	3	6	DNS	3	3	3	7	5	Ret	4	4	DNS	40
9	(France) Christophe Bouchut	(Belgium) Selleslagh Racing Team	4	1	4	7	Ret	Ret	Ret	5	6	3	8	Ret		32.5
9	(Netherlands) Xavier Maassen	(Belgium) Selleslagh Racing Team	4	1	4	7	Ret	Ret	Ret	5	6	3	8	Ret		32.5
10	(France) Stéphane Sarrazin	(Germany) Vitaphone Racing Team					1	1	1							20
10	(Belgium) Eric van de Poele	(Germany) Vitaphone Racing Team					1	1	1							20
11	(Belgium) Bert Longin	(Belgium) PekaRacing nv	12	6	Ret	10	8	7	Ret	6	4	Ret	Ret	Ret	1	18.5
11	(Belgium) Anthony Kumpen	(Belgium) PekaRacing nv	12	6	Ret	10	8	7	Ret	6	4	Ret	Ret	Ret	1	18.5
12	(Germany) Alex Müller	(Austria) Jetalliance Racing	6	Ret	Ret	2	5	Ret	Ret	DNS	DNS	5	DNS			17
12	(Austria) Lukas Lichtner-Hoyer	(Austria) Jetalliance Racing	6	Ret	Ret	2	5	Ret	Ret	DNS	DNS	5				17
13	(Italy) Alessandro Pier Guidi	(Germany) Vitaphone Racing Team					2	2	2							16
13	(Belgium) Stéphane Lémeret	(Germany) Vitaphone Racing Team					2	2	2							16
14	(United Kingdom) Darren Turner	(United Kingdom) Gigawave Motorsport					3	3	3							12
14	(United Kingdom) Andrew Thompson	(United Kingdom) Gigawave Motorsport					3	3	3							12
15	(Belgium) Vincent Vosse	(France) Larbre Compétition	9	8	5	8	DNS	DNS	DNS				7	7		10
15	(Belgium) Grégory Franchi	(France) Larbre Compétition	9	8	5	8	DNS	DNS	DNS				7	7		10
16	(United Kingdom) Ben Aucott	(Monaco) JMB Racing	15	9	7	9	7	6	4							9.5
16	(France) Alain Ferté	(Monaco) JMB Racing			7	9	7	6	4							9.5
17	(Russia) Roman Rusinov	(Germany) IPB Spartak Reiter Engineering	10	Ret			6	4	5	8	7					9.5
17	(Netherlands) Peter Kox	(Germany) IPB Spartak Reiter Engineering	10	Ret			6	4	5	8	7					9.5
18	(Netherlands) Jan Lammers	(Germany) IPB Spartak Reiter Engineering					6	4	5							8
18	(Czech Republic) Tomáš Enge	(Germany) IPB Spartak Reiter Engineering					6	4	5							8
19	(France) Stéphane Daoudi	(Monaco) JMB Racing		9			7	6	4							7.5
20	(Argentina) Esteban Tuero	Escuderia ACA Argentina	13	10	8							8	9		4	7
21	(Belgium) Maxime Soulet	(Belgium) Selleslagh Racing Team					Ret	Ret	Ret						3	6
21	(Argentina) Christian Ledesma	(Belgium) Selleslagh Racing Team													3	6
22	(Argentina) José María López	Escuderia ACA Argentina			8	Ret								Ret	4	6
23	(Argentina) Ricardo Risatti	(Germany) Phoenix Carsport Racing													6	3
24	(Belgium) Frédéric Bouvy	(Belgium) PekaRacing nv					8	7	Ret							1.5
24	(Belgium) Kurt Mollekens	(Belgium) PekaRacing nv					8	7	Ret							1.5
25	(Argentina) Martín Basso	Escuderia ACA Argentina				Ret						8		Ret	Ret	1
25	(Portugal) Pedro Lamy	(Germany) Team Vitasystems												8		1
25	(Italy) Matteo Bobbi	(Germany) Team Vitasystems												8		1
Pos.	Driver	Team	SIL (United Kingdom)	MON (Italy)	ADR (Italy)	OSC (Germany)	6H	12H	24H	R1	R2	BRN (Czech Republic)	NOG (France)	ZOL (Belgium)	SAN (Argentina)	Total points
Pos.	Driver	Team	SIL (United Kingdom)	MON (Italy)	ADR (Italy)	OSC (Germany)	SPA (Belgium)			BUC (Romania)		BRN (Czech Republic)	NOG (France)	ZOL (Belgium)	SAN (Argentina)	Total points

Colour	Result
Gold	Winner
Silver	Second place
Bronze	Third place
Green	Points classification
Blue	Non-points classification
Blue	Non-classified finish (NC)
Purple	Retired, not classified (Ret)
Red	Did not qualify (DNQ)
Red	Did not pre-qualify (DNPQ)
Black	Disqualified (DSQ)
White	Did not start (DNS)
White	Withdrew (WD)
White	Race cancelled (C)
Blank	Did not practice (DNP)
Blank	Did not arrive (DNA)
Blank	Excluded (EX)

=== GT2 standings ===
Pos.	Driver	Team	SIL (United Kingdom)	MON (Italy)	ADR (Italy)	OSC (Germany)	SPA (Belgium)			BUC (Romania)		BRN (Czech Republic)	NOG (France)	ZOL (Belgium)	SAN (Argentina)	Total points
Pos.	Driver	Team	SIL (United Kingdom)	MON (Italy)	ADR (Italy)	OSC (Germany)	6H	12H	24H	R1	R2	BRN (Czech Republic)	NOG (France)	ZOL (Belgium)	SAN (Argentina)	Total points
1	(Italy) Gianmaria Bruni	(Italy) AF Corse	1	2	1	1	2	3	3	2	2	1	3	1	2	93
1	(Finland) Toni Vilander	(Italy) AF Corse	1	2	1	1	2	3	3	2	2	1	3	1	2	93
2	(Italy) Paolo Ruberti	(Italy) BMS Scuderia Italia	3	5	3	8	1	1	1	4	5	3	7	2	6	60.5
2	(Italy) Matteo Malucelli	(Italy) BMS Scuderia Italia	3	5	3	8	1	1	1	4	5	3	7	2	6	60.5
3	(United Kingdom) Richard Westbrook	(Belgium) Prospeed Competition	DSQ	1	DSQ	4	3	2	2	3	3	Ret	1	4	Ret	51
4	(Italy) Thomas Biagi	(Italy) AF Corse	4	3	2	2	7	Ret	Ret	5	Ret	4	5	Ret	3	45
4	(San Marino) Christian Montanari	(Italy) AF Corse	4	3	2	2	7	Ret	Ret	5	Ret	4	5	Ret	3	45
5	(France) Emmanuel Collard	(Belgium) Prospeed Competition	DSQ	1	DSQ	4	3	2	2	3	3	Ret		4	Ret	41
6	(United Kingdom) Andrew Kirkaldy	(United Kingdom) CR Scuderia	2	7	Ret	3	5	9	6	1	1	Ret	8	Ret	4	37
6	(United Kingdom) Rob Bell	(United Kingdom) CR Scuderia	2	7	Ret	3	5	9	6	1	1		8	Ret	4	37
7	(Switzerland) Joël Camathias	(Italy) BMS Scuderia Italia	7	6	5	5	1	1	1	8	Ret	10	10	7	Ret	35.5
8	(Italy) Davide Rigon	(Italy) BMS Scuderia Italia	7	6	5	5	1	1	1	8	Ret	10				33.5
9	(United Kingdom) Tim Mullen	(United Kingdom) CR Scuderia	5	8	7	11	9	4	4	6	Ret	9	2	6	9	27
10	(Argentina) Matías Russo	(Italy) Advanced Engineering Pecom Racing Team	9	9	6	6				Ret	6	6	9	5	1	25.5
10	(Argentina) Matías Russo	(Italy) AF Corse					7	Ret	Ret							25.5
11	(Argentina) Luís Pérez Companc	(Italy) Advanced Engineering Pecom Racing Team	9	9	6	6				Ret	6	6	9	5	1	24.5
12	(United Kingdom) Jamie Davies	(United Kingdom) Scuderia Ecosse	10	4	4	10	8	6	8	7	4	8	6	8	7	24.5
12	(Italy) Fabio Babini	(United Kingdom) Scuderia Ecosse	10	4	4	10	8	6	8	7	4	8	6	8	7	24.5
13	(Germany) Marc Lieb	(Belgium) Prospeed Competition					3	2	2					3		21
13	(Germany) Marc Lieb	(Germany) Team Felbermayr-Proton								9	Ret					21
14	(Switzerland) Henri Moser	(Switzerland) Kessel Racing	8	10	8	7	11	5	5	Ret	7	7	4	Ret	8	19
15	(Finland) Markus Palttala	(Belgium) Prospeed Competition	6	11	DSQ	9	6	Ret	Ret	DNS	DNS	5	Ret	3	5	18.5
16	(Italy) Andrea Piccini	(United Kingdom) CR Scuderia					9	4	4				2			15.5
17	(Canada) Chris Niarchos	(United Kingdom) CR Scuderia	5		7	11	9	4	4	6	Ret	9			9	15
18	(Brazil) Jaime Melo	(Italy) AF Corse					2	3	3							13
18	(Finland) Mika Salo	(Italy) AF Corse					2	3	3							13
19	(Italy) Fabrizio Del Monte	(Switzerland) Kessel Racing	8	10	8	7	11	5	5	Ret	7	7				13
20	(Finland) Mikael Forsten	(Belgium) Prospeed Competition	6	11	DSQ	9	6	Ret	Ret	DNS	DNS	5	Ret		5	12.5
21	(Australia) Alex Davison	(Belgium) Prospeed Competition											1			10
22	(Czech Republic) Jiří Janák	(Czech Republic) K plus K Motorsport										2				8
22	(Germany) Tim Bergmeister	(Czech Republic) K plus K Motorsport										2				8
23	(United Kingdom) James Sutton	(United Kingdom) CR Scuderia					5	9	6					6		8
24	(United Kingdom) Gordon Shedden	(United Kingdom) CR Scuderia					9	4	4							7.5
25	(Italy) Andrea Palma	(Switzerland) Kessel Racing					11	5	5							6
25	(France) Gilles Vannelet	(Switzerland) Kessel Racing					11	5	5							6
26	(Italy) Maurizio Mediani	(Switzerland) Kessel Racing											4			5
27	(Germany) Dirk Müller	(United Kingdom) CR Scuderia					5	9	6			Ret				5
28	(Austria) Richard Lietz	(France) IMSA Performance Matmut					4	11	7							4.5
28	(Austria) Richard Lietz	(Germany) Team Felbermayr-Proton								10	Ret					4.5
28	(United States) Patrick Long	(France) IMSA Performance Matmut					4	11	7							4.5
28	(France) Raymond Narac	(France) IMSA Performance Matmut					4	11	7							4.5
29	(Italy) Ferdinando Monfardini	(United Kingdom) Scuderia Ecosse					8	6	8							3
30	(Argentina) José Manuel Balbiani	(Italy) BMS Scuderia Italia											10	7	10	2
31	(United Kingdom) Tim Sugden	(United Kingdom) CR Scuderia		8												2
31	(United Kingdom) Tim Sugden	(United Kingdom) Trackspeed Racing					10	7	Ret							2
32	(Germany) Wolf Henzler	(Belgium) Prospeed Competition					6	Ret	Ret							1.5
32	(Belgium) Geoffroy Horion	(Belgium) Prospeed Competition					6	Ret	Ret							1.5
33	(Italy) Niki Cadei	(Switzerland) Kessel Racing													8	1
34	(United Kingdom) David Ashburn	(United Kingdom) Trackspeed Racing	11	12	DSQ	12	10	7	Ret			11	11		DNS	1
34	(United Kingdom) Richard Williams	(United Kingdom) Trackspeed Racing	11	12	DSQ	12	10	7	Ret			11	11		DNS	1
35	(Germany) Dominik Farnbacher	(Italy) AF Corse					7	Ret	Ret							1
36	(New Zealand) Craig Baird	(Australia) Juniper Racing					13	8	9							0.5
36	(Australia) Rodney Forbes	(Australia) Juniper Racing					13	8	9							0.5
36	(Australia) Shaun Juniper	(Australia) Juniper Racing					13	8	9							0.5
36	(Australia) Max Twigg	(Australia) Juniper Racing					13	8	9							0.5
Pos.	Driver	Team	SIL (United Kingdom)	MON (Italy)	ADR (Italy)	OSC (Germany)	6H	12H	24H	R1	R2	BRN (Czech Republic)	NOG (France)	ZOL (Belgium)	SAN (Argentina)	Total points
Pos.	Driver	Team	SIL (United Kingdom)	MON (Italy)	ADR (Italy)	OSC (Germany)	SPA (Belgium)			BUC (Romania)		BRN (Czech Republic)	NOG (France)	ZOL (Belgium)	SAN (Argentina)	Total points

=== Citation Cup standings ===
The Citation Cup, which was limited to non-professional drivers competing in GT1 cars, did not include the Spa 24 Hours (Round 6) and the San Luis 2 Hours (Round 10).

Pos	Driver	Team	Rd 1	Rd 2	Rd 3	Rd 4	Rd 5	Rd 7	Rd 8	Rd 9	Total
1=	(Belarus) Alexander Talkanitsa	(Austria) AT Racing	10	10							20
1=	(Germany) Wolfgang Kaufmann	(Austria) AT Racing	10	10							20
3=	(Slovakia) Miro Konôpka	(Slovakia) ARC Bratislava	8								8
3=	(United Kingdom) Sean Edwards	(Slovakia) ARC Bratislava	8								8

== Teams championships ==
Points were awarded to the top 8 finishers in the order of 10–8–6–5–4–3–2–1 except at the Spa 24 Hours, where half points were also granted for the leaders after 6 and 12 hours. Both cars scored points towards the championship regardless of finishing position. The G2 class did not have a championship.

=== GT1 standings ===
Pos.	Team	SIL (United Kingdom)	MON (Italy)	ADR (Italy)	OSC (Germany)	SPA (Belgium)			BUC (Romania)		BRN (Czech Republic)	NOG (France)	ZOL (Belgium)	SAN (Argentina)	Total points
Pos.	Team	SIL (United Kingdom)	MON (Italy)	ADR (Italy)	OSC (Germany)	6H	12H	24H	R1	R2	BRN (Czech Republic)	NOG (France)	ZOL (Belgium)	SAN (Argentina)	Total points
1	(Germany) Vitaphone Racing Team	2	2	2	4	1	1	1	3	2	6	1	1	5	122.5
1	(Germany) Vitaphone Racing Team	7	5	10	5	2	2	2	4	3	7	6	6	Ret	122.5
2	(Germany) Phoenix Carsport Racing	5	4	1	3	4	5	Ret	1	1	2	2	2	2	107
2	(Germany) Phoenix Carsport Racing	8	Ret	3	6	Ret	Ret	Ret	2	Ret	4	3	5	6	107
3	(Austria) Jetalliance Racing	1	7	Ret	1	5	Ret	Ret	DNS	DNS	1	5	3		59
3	(Austria) Jetalliance Racing	6	Ret	Ret	2				DNS	DNS	5	DNS			59
4	(United Kingdom) Gigawave Motorsport	3	3	6	DNS	3	3	3	7	5	Ret	4	4	DNS	40
5	(Belgium) Selleslagh Racing Team	4	1	4	7	Ret	Ret	Ret	5	6	3	8	Ret	3	38.5
6	(Belgium) PekaRacing nv	12	6	Ret	10	8	7	Ret	6	4	Ret	Ret	Ret	1	18.5
7	(France) Larbre Compétition	9	8	5	8	DNS	DNS	DNS				7	7	Ret	10
8	(Monaco) JMB Racing	15	9	7	9	7	6	4							9.5
9	(Germany) IPB Spartak Reiter Engineering	10	Ret			6	4	5	8	7					9.5
10	Escuderia ACA Argentina	13	10	8	Ret						8	9	Ret	4	7
10	Escuderia ACA Argentina													Ret	7
11	(Germany) Team Vitasystems												8		1
-	(Austria) AT Racing	14	11	9	Ret						9				0
-	(Austria) Team Rbimmo / B-Racing	11	Ret	Ret							DNS				0
-	(Italy) Lanza Motorsport		Ret												0
-	(Belgium) DKR Engineering											Ret			0
-	(Switzerland) Kessel Racing		DNS												0

Colour	Result
Gold	Winner
Silver	Second place
Bronze	Third place
Green	Points classification
Blue	Non-points classification
Blue	Non-classified finish (NC)
Purple	Retired, not classified (Ret)
Red	Did not qualify (DNQ)
Red	Did not pre-qualify (DNPQ)
Black	Disqualified (DSQ)
White	Did not start (DNS)
White	Withdrew (WD)
White	Race cancelled (C)
Blank	Did not practice (DNP)
Blank	Did not arrive (DNA)
Blank	Excluded (EX)

=== GT2 standings ===
Pos.	Team	SIL (United Kingdom)	MON (Italy)	ADR (Italy)	OSC (Germany)	SPA (Belgium)			BUC (Romania)		BRN (Czech Republic)	NOG (France)	ZOL (Belgium)	SAN (Argentina)	Total points
Pos.	Team	SIL (United Kingdom)	MON (Italy)	ADR (Italy)	OSC (Germany)	6H	12H	24H	R1	R2	BRN (Czech Republic)	NOG (France)	ZOL (Belgium)	SAN (Argentina)	Total points
1	(Italy) AF Corse	1	2	1	1	2	3	3	2	2	1	3	1	2	138
1	(Italy) AF Corse	4	3	2	2	7	Ret	Ret	5	Ret	4	5	Ret	3	138
2	(Italy) BMS Scuderia Italia	3	5	3	5	1	1	1	4	5	3	7	2	6	76
2	(Italy) BMS Scuderia Italia	7	6	5	8				8	Ret	10	10	7	Ret	76
3	(Belgium) Prospeed Competition	6	1	DSQ	4	3	2	2	3	3	5	1	3	5	69.5
3	(Belgium) Prospeed Competition	DSQ	11	DSQ	9	6	Ret	Ret	DNS	DNS	Ret	Ret	4	Ret	69.5
4	(United Kingdom) CR Scuderia	2	7	7	3	9	4	4	1	1	9	2	6	4	64
4	(United Kingdom) CR Scuderia	5	8	Ret	11	5	9	6	6	Ret	Ret	8	Ret	9	64
5	(Italy) Advanced Engineering Pecom Racing Team	9	9	6	6				Ret	6	6	9	5	1	24.5
6	(United Kingdom) Scuderia Ecosse	10	4	4	10	8	6	8	7	4	8	6	8	7	23.5
7	(Switzerland) Kessel Racing	8	10	8	7	11	5	5	Ret	7	7	4	Ret	8	19
8	(Czech Republic) K plus K Motorsport										2				8
9	(France) IMSA Performance Matmut					4	11	7							4.5
10	(United Kingdom) Trackspeed Racing	11	12	DSQ	12	10	7	Ret			11	11		DNS	1
11	(Australia) Juniper Racing					13	8	9							0.5
-	(Germany) Team Felbermayr-Proton								9	Ret					0
-	(Germany) Team Felbermayr-Proton								10	Ret					0
-	(Slovakia) ARC Bratislava										12				0
-	(Italy) Victor Racing		13												0
-	(Italy) Easy Race SRL					12	10	Ret							0

== Bibliography ==
- Loisy, Olivier (2008). FIA GT & GT3 European Championship 2008 Yearbook. Paris: Apollo Publishing. ISBN 978-2952104425.
