= 2008 FIA GT San Luis 2 Hours =

The Potrero de los Funes Circuit

The 2008 FIA GT San Luis 2 Hours was the final race of the 2008 FIA GT Championship season. It took place at the new Potrero de los Funes Circuit in Argentina on 23 November 2008. It is the first time in FIA GT Championship history that an event has been held in South America.

== Race results ==
Class winners in bold. Cars failing to complete 75% of winner's distance marked as Not Classified (NC).

Pos	Class	No	Team	Drivers	Chassis	Tyre	Laps
Pos	Class	No	Team	Drivers	Engine	Tyre	Laps
1	**GT1**	**4**	**(Belgium) Peka Racing**	**(Belgium) Anthony Kumpen (Belgium) Bert Longin**	**Saleen S7-R**	P	**51**
1	**GT1**	**4**	**(Belgium) Peka Racing**	**(Belgium) Anthony Kumpen (Belgium) Bert Longin**	**Ford 7.0 L V8**	P	**51**
2	GT1	6	(Germany) Phoenix Carsport Racing	(Netherlands) Mike Hezemans (Italy) Fabrizio Gollin	Chevrolet Corvette C6.R	MI	51
2	GT1	6	(Germany) Phoenix Carsport Racing	(Netherlands) Mike Hezemans (Italy) Fabrizio Gollin	Chevrolet LS7R 7.0 L V8	MI	51
3	GT1	3	(Belgium) Selleslagh Racing Team	(Belgium) Maxime Soulet (Belgium) Armand Fumal (Argentina) Christian Ledesma	Chevrolet Corvette C6.R	MI	51
3	GT1	3	(Belgium) Selleslagh Racing Team	(Belgium) Maxime Soulet (Belgium) Armand Fumal (Argentina) Christian Ledesma	Chevrolet LS7R 7.0 L V8	MI	51
4	GT1	37	Escuderia ACA Argentina	(Argentina) José María López (Argentina) Esteban Tuero	Ferrari 550-GTS Maranello	MI	51
4	GT1	37	Escuderia ACA Argentina	(Argentina) José María López (Argentina) Esteban Tuero	Ferrari 5.9 L V12	MI	51
5	GT1	1	(Germany) Vitaphone Racing Team	(Germany) Michael Bartels (Italy) Andrea Bertolini	Maserati MC12 GT1	MI	51
5	GT1	1	(Germany) Vitaphone Racing Team	(Germany) Michael Bartels (Italy) Andrea Bertolini	Maserati 6.0 L V12	MI	51
6	**GT2**	**95**	**(Italy) Advanced Engineering (Argentina) PeCom Racing Team**	**(Argentina) Matías Russo (Argentina) Luís Pérez Companc**	**Ferrari F430 GT2**	MI	**50**
6	**GT2**	**95**	**(Italy) Advanced Engineering (Argentina) PeCom Racing Team**	**(Argentina) Matías Russo (Argentina) Luís Pérez Companc**	**Ferrari 4.0 L V8**	MI	**50**
7	GT2	50	(Italy) AF Corse	(Italy) Gianmaria Bruni (Finland) Toni Vilander	Ferrari F430 GT2	MI	50
7	GT2	50	(Italy) AF Corse	(Italy) Gianmaria Bruni (Finland) Toni Vilander	Ferrari 4.0 L V8	MI	50
8	GT2	51	(Italy) AF Corse	(Italy) Thomas Biagi (San Marino) Christian Montanari	Ferrari F430 GT2	MI	50
8	GT2	51	(Italy) AF Corse	(Italy) Thomas Biagi (San Marino) Christian Montanari	Ferrari 4.0 L V8	MI	50
9	GT2	56	(United Kingdom) CR Scuderia Racing	(United Kingdom) Andrew Kirkaldy (United Kingdom) Rob Bell	Ferrari F430 GT2	MI	49
9	GT2	56	(United Kingdom) CR Scuderia Racing	(United Kingdom) Andrew Kirkaldy (United Kingdom) Rob Bell	Ferrari 4.0 L V8	MI	49
10	GT2	60	(Belgium) Prospeed Competition	(Finland) Markus Palttala (Finland) Mikael Forsten	Porsche 997 GT3-RSR	MI	49
10	GT2	60	(Belgium) Prospeed Competition	(Finland) Markus Palttala (Finland) Mikael Forsten	Porsche 4.0 L Flat-6	MI	49
11	GT2	77	(Italy) BMS Scuderia Italia	(Italy) Paolo Ruberti (Italy) Matteo Malucelli	Ferrari F430 GT2	P	49
11	GT2	77	(Italy) BMS Scuderia Italia	(Italy) Paolo Ruberti (Italy) Matteo Malucelli	Ferrari 4.0 L V8	P	49
12	GT2	62	(United Kingdom) Scuderia Ecosse	(United Kingdom) Jamie Davies (Italy) Fabio Babini	Ferrari F430 GT2	P	49
12	GT2	62	(United Kingdom) Scuderia Ecosse	(United Kingdom) Jamie Davies (Italy) Fabio Babini	Ferrari 4.0 L V8	P	49
13	GT2	57	(Switzerland) Kessel Racing	(Switzerland) Henri Moser (Italy) Niki Cadei	Ferrari F430 GT2	MI	49
13	GT2	57	(Switzerland) Kessel Racing	(Switzerland) Henri Moser (Italy) Niki Cadei	Ferrari 4.0 L V8	MI	49
14	GT2	55	(United Kingdom) CR Scuderia Racing	(Canada) Chris Niarchos (United Kingdom) Tim Mullen	Ferrari F430 GT2	MI	46
14	GT2	55	(United Kingdom) CR Scuderia Racing	(Canada) Chris Niarchos (United Kingdom) Tim Mullen	Ferrari 4.0 L V8	MI	46
15 DNF	GT2	78	(Italy) BMS Scuderia Italia	(Switzerland) Joël Camathias (Argentina) José Manuel Balbiani	Ferrari F430 GT2	P	45
15 DNF	GT2	78	(Italy) BMS Scuderia Italia	(Switzerland) Joël Camathias (Argentina) José Manuel Balbiani	Ferrari 4.0 L V8	P	45
16 DNF	GT1	5	(Germany) Phoenix Carsport Racing	(Argentina) Ricardo Risatti (Switzerland) Marcel Fässler	Chevrolet Corvette C6.R	MI	41
16 DNF	GT1	5	(Germany) Phoenix Carsport Racing	(Argentina) Ricardo Risatti (Switzerland) Marcel Fässler	Chevrolet LS7R 7.0 L V8	MI	41
17 DNF	G2	101	(Belgium) Belgian Racing	(Belgium) Bas Leinders (Belgium) Renaud Kuppens	Gillet Vertigo Streiff	P	27
17 DNF	G2	101	(Belgium) Belgian Racing	(Belgium) Bas Leinders (Belgium) Renaud Kuppens	Maserati 4.2 L V8	P	27
18 DNF	GT1	7	(France) Larbre Compétition	(France) Frédéric Makowiecki (France) Roland Bervillé	Saleen S7-R	MI	25
18 DNF	GT1	7	(France) Larbre Compétition	(France) Frédéric Makowiecki (France) Roland Bervillé	Ford 7.0 L V8	MI	25
19 DNF	GT1	2	(Germany) Vitaphone Racing Team	(Portugal) Miguel Ramos (Brazil) Alexandre Negrão	Maserati MC12 GT1	MI	20
19 DNF	GT1	2	(Germany) Vitaphone Racing Team	(Portugal) Miguel Ramos (Brazil) Alexandre Negrão	Maserati 6.0 L V12	MI	20
20 DNF	GT1	38	Escuderia ACA Argentina	(Argentina) Martín Basso (Argentina) Gastón Mazzacane	Ferrari 550-GTS Maranello	MI	17
20 DNF	GT1	38	Escuderia ACA Argentina	(Argentina) Martín Basso (Argentina) Gastón Mazzacane	Ferrari 5.9 L V12	MI	17
21 DNF	GT2	61	(Belgium) Prospeed Competition	(France) Emmanuel Collard (United Kingdom) Richard Westbrook	Porsche 997 GT3-RSR	MI	5
21 DNF	GT2	61	(Belgium) Prospeed Competition	(France) Emmanuel Collard (United Kingdom) Richard Westbrook	Porsche 4.0 L Flat-6	MI	5
DNQ	GT1	10	(United Kingdom) Gigawave Motorsport	(Austria) Philipp Peter (Denmark) Allan Simonsen	Aston Martin DBR9	MI	–
DNQ	GT1	10	(United Kingdom) Gigawave Motorsport	(Austria) Philipp Peter (Denmark) Allan Simonsen	Aston Martin 6.0 L V12	MI	–
DNQ	GT2	59	(United Kingdom) Trackspeed Racing	(United Kingdom) Tim Sugden (United Kingdom) David Ashburn	Porsche 997 GT3-RSR	MI	–
DNQ	GT2	59	(United Kingdom) Trackspeed Racing	(United Kingdom) Tim Sugden (United Kingdom) David Ashburn	Porsche 4.0 L Flat-6	MI	–

== Statistics ==
- Pole Position – #5 Phoenix Carsport – 2:13.236
- Average Speed – 159.63 km/h (99.19 mph)

FIA GT Championship
Previous race: 2008 FIA GT Zolder 2 Hours	2008 season	Next race: None
