= 2008 FIA GT Bucharest 2 Hours =

Motor racing championship season

The layout of the Bucharest Ring

The 2008 Bucharest City Challenge was the sixth race of the 2008 FIA GT Championship season back racing After summer break and was organised by City Challenge GmbH. It took place at the Bucharest Ring temporary street circuit in Bucharest, Romania, on 23 – 24 August 2008.

== Format ==
Unlike the previous running at Bucharest in 2007, the 2008 event introduced a new event format that involved two races. After qualification, a one-hour race was held and entries were awarded half of the standard FIA points for their finishing positions. On Sunday, a second one-hour race was held, with the starting grid being determined by the finishing order of the first race. Half points were again rewarded based on finishing order.

== Race results ==
Class winners in bold. Cars failing to complete 75% of winner's distance marked as Not Classified (NC).

=== Saturday ===
Phoenix Carsport lead the field as the #5 Corvette of Swiss drivers Marcel Fässler and Jean-Denis Délétraz earned victory from pole position over the team's second car. In the GT2 category, CR Scuderia earned their first ever victory in the FIA GT Championship, just ahead of defending class champions AF Corse.

Pos	Class	No	Team	Drivers	Chassis	Tyre	Laps
Pos	Class	No	Team	Drivers	Engine	Tyre	Laps
1	**GT1**	**5**	**(Germany) Phoenix Carsport Racing**	**(Switzerland) Jean-Denis Délétraz (Switzerland) Marcel Fāssler**	**Chevrolet Corvette C6.R**	MI	**46**
1	**GT1**	**5**	**(Germany) Phoenix Carsport Racing**	**(Switzerland) Jean-Denis Délétraz (Switzerland) Marcel Fāssler**	**Chevrolet LS7R 7.0 L V8**	MI	**46**
2	GT1	6	(Germany) Phoenix Carsport Racing	(Netherlands) Mike Hezemans (Italy) Fabrizio Gollin	Chevrolet Corvette C6.R	MI	46
2	GT1	6	(Germany) Phoenix Carsport Racing	(Netherlands) Mike Hezemans (Italy) Fabrizio Gollin	Chevrolet LS7R 7.0 L V8	MI	46
3	GT1	1	(Germany) Vitaphone Racing Team	(Germany) Michael Bartels (Italy) Andrea Bertolini	Maserati MC12 GT1	MI	46
3	GT1	1	(Germany) Vitaphone Racing Team	(Germany) Michael Bartels (Italy) Andrea Bertolini	Maserati 6.0 L V12	MI	46
4	GT1	2	(Germany) Vitaphone Racing Team	(Portugal) Miguel Ramos (Brazil) Alexandre Negrão	Maserati MC12 GT1	MI	46
4	GT1	2	(Germany) Vitaphone Racing Team	(Portugal) Miguel Ramos (Brazil) Alexandre Negrão	Maserati 6.0 L V12	MI	46
5	GT1	3	(Belgium) Selleslagh Racing Team	(France) Christophe Bouchut (Netherlands) Xavier Maassen	Chevrolet Corvette C6.R	MI	46
5	GT1	3	(Belgium) Selleslagh Racing Team	(France) Christophe Bouchut (Netherlands) Xavier Maassen	Chevrolet LS7R 7.0 L V8	MI	46
6	GT1	4	(Belgium) Peka Racing	(Belgium) Anthony Kumpen (Belgium) Bert Longin	Saleen S7-R	P	46
6	GT1	4	(Belgium) Peka Racing	(Belgium) Anthony Kumpen (Belgium) Bert Longin	Ford 7.0 L V8	P	46
7	GT1	10	(United Kingdom) Gigawave Motorsport	(Austria) Philipp Peter (Denmark) Allan Simonsen	Aston Martin DBR9	MI	46
7	GT1	10	(United Kingdom) Gigawave Motorsport	(Austria) Philipp Peter (Denmark) Allan Simonsen	Aston Martin 6.0 L V12	MI	46
8	GT1	8	(Russia) IPB Spartak Racing (Germany) Reiter Engineering	(Netherlands) Peter Kox (Russia) Roman Rusinov	Lamborghini Murciélago R-GT	MI	45
8	GT1	8	(Russia) IPB Spartak Racing (Germany) Reiter Engineering	(Netherlands) Peter Kox (Russia) Roman Rusinov	Lamborghini 6.0 L V12	MI	45
9	**GT2**	**56**	**(United Kingdom) CR Scuderia Racing**	**(United Kingdom) Andrew Kirkaldy (United Kingdom) Rob Bell**	**Ferrari F430 GT2**	MI	**45**
9	**GT2**	**56**	**(United Kingdom) CR Scuderia Racing**	**(United Kingdom) Andrew Kirkaldy (United Kingdom) Rob Bell**	**Ferrari 4.0 L V8**	MI	**45**
10	GT2	50	(Italy) AF Corse	(Italy) Gianmaria Bruni (Finland) Toni Vilander	Ferrari F430 GT2	MI	45
10	GT2	50	(Italy) AF Corse	(Italy) Gianmaria Bruni (Finland) Toni Vilander	Ferrari 4.0 L V8	MI	45
11	GT2	61	(Belgium) Prospeed Competition	(France) Emmanuel Collard (United Kingdom) Richard Westbrook	Porsche 997 GT3-RSR	MI	45
11	GT2	61	(Belgium) Prospeed Competition	(France) Emmanuel Collard (United Kingdom) Richard Westbrook	Porsche 4.0 L Flat-6	MI	45
12	GT2	77	(Italy) BMS Scuderia Italia	(Italy) Paolo Ruberti (Italy) Matteo Malucelli	Ferrari F430 GT2	P	44
12	GT2	77	(Italy) BMS Scuderia Italia	(Italy) Paolo Ruberti (Italy) Matteo Malucelli	Ferrari 4.0 L V8	P	44
13	GT2	51	(Italy) AF Corse	(Italy) Thomas Biagi (San Marino) Christian Montanari	Ferrari F430 GT2	MI	44
13	GT2	51	(Italy) AF Corse	(Italy) Thomas Biagi (San Marino) Christian Montanari	Ferrari 4.0 L V8	MI	44
14	GT2	55	(United Kingdom) CR Scuderia Racing	(Canada) Chris Niarchos (United Kingdom) Tim Mullen	Ferrari F430 GT2	MI	44
14	GT2	55	(United Kingdom) CR Scuderia Racing	(Canada) Chris Niarchos (United Kingdom) Tim Mullen	Ferrari 4.0 L V8	MI	44
15	GT2	62	(United Kingdom) Scuderia Ecosse	(United Kingdom) Jamie Davies (Italy) Fabio Babini	Ferrari F430 GT2	P	44
15	GT2	62	(United Kingdom) Scuderia Ecosse	(United Kingdom) Jamie Davies (Italy) Fabio Babini	Ferrari 4.0 L V8	P	44
16	GT2	78	(Italy) BMS Scuderia Italia	(Switzerland) Joël Camathias (Italy) Davide Rigon	Ferrari F430 GT2	P	44
16	GT2	78	(Italy) BMS Scuderia Italia	(Switzerland) Joël Camathias (Italy) Davide Rigon	Ferrari 4.0 L V8	P	44
17	GT2	66	(Germany) Team Felbermayr-Proton	(Germany) Marc Lieb (Austria) Horst Felbermayr Jr.	Porsche 997 GT3-RSR	MI	43
17	GT2	66	(Germany) Team Felbermayr-Proton	(Germany) Marc Lieb (Austria) Horst Felbermayr Jr.	Porsche 4.0 L Flat-6	MI	43
18	GT2	69	(Germany) Team Felbermayr-Proton	(Austria) Richard Lietz (Austria) Horst Felbermayr Sr.	Porsche 997 GT3-RSR	MI	43
18	GT2	69	(Germany) Team Felbermayr-Proton	(Austria) Richard Lietz (Austria) Horst Felbermayr Sr.	Porsche 4.0 L Flat-6	MI	43
19	**G2**	**101**	**(Belgium) Belgian Racing**	**(Belgium) Bas Leinders (Belgium) Renaud Kuppens**	**Gillet Vertigo Streiff**	P	**42**
19	**G2**	**101**	**(Belgium) Belgian Racing**	**(Belgium) Bas Leinders (Belgium) Renaud Kuppens**	**Maserati 4.2 L V8**	P	**42**
20 DNF	GT2	95	(Italy) Advanced Engineering (Argentina) PeCom Racing Team	(Argentina) Matías Russo (Argentina) Luís Pérez Companc	Ferrari F430 GT2	MI	28
20 DNF	GT2	95	(Italy) Advanced Engineering (Argentina) PeCom Racing Team	(Argentina) Matías Russo (Argentina) Luís Pérez Companc	Ferrari 4.0 L V8	MI	28
21 DNF	GT2	57	(Switzerland) Kessel Racing	(Switzerland) Henri Moser (Italy) Fabrizio del Monte	Ferrari F430 GT2	MI	23
21 DNF	GT2	57	(Switzerland) Kessel Racing	(Switzerland) Henri Moser (Italy) Fabrizio del Monte	Ferrari 4.0 L V8	MI	23
DNS	GT1	33	(Austria) Jetalliance Racing	(Austria) Karl Wendlinger (United Kingdom) Ryan Sharp	Aston Martin DBR9	MI	–
DNS	GT1	33	(Austria) Jetalliance Racing	(Austria) Karl Wendlinger (United Kingdom) Ryan Sharp	Aston Martin 6.0 L V12	MI	–
DNS	GT1	36	(Austria) Jetalliance Racing	(Austria) Lukas Lichtner-Hoyer (Germany) Alex Müller	Aston Martin DBR9	MI	–
DNS	GT1	36	(Austria) Jetalliance Racing	(Austria) Lukas Lichtner-Hoyer (Germany) Alex Müller	Aston Martin 6.0 L V12	MI	–
DNS	GT2	60	(Belgium) Prospeed Competition	(Finland) Markus Palttala (Finland) Mikael Forsten	Porsche 997 GT3-RSR	MI	–
DNS	GT2	60	(Belgium) Prospeed Competition	(Finland) Markus Palttala (Finland) Mikael Forsten	Porsche 4.0 L Flat-6	MI	–

=== Sunday ===
Phoenix Carsport continued their victorious run on Sunday as the #5 car once again led the field to the checkered flag, although the team's second Corvette failed to make the finish after hitting a wall with ten laps remaining. CR Scuderia also won for the second time, Andrew Kirkaldy and Rob Bell's Ferrari overtaking the AF Corse Ferrari in the closing laps.

Pos	Class	No	Team	Drivers	Chassis	Tyre	Laps
Pos	Class	No	Team	Drivers	Engine	Tyre	Laps
1	**GT1**	**5**	**(Germany) Phoenix Carsport Racing**	**(Switzerland) Jean-Denis Délétraz (Switzerland) Marcel Fāssler**	**Chevrolet Corvette C6.R**	MI	**46**
1	**GT1**	**5**	**(Germany) Phoenix Carsport Racing**	**(Switzerland) Jean-Denis Délétraz (Switzerland) Marcel Fāssler**	**Chevrolet LS7R 7.0 L V8**	MI	**46**
2	GT1	2	(Germany) Vitaphone Racing Team	(Portugal) Miguel Ramos (Brazil) Alexandre Negrão	Maserati MC12 GT1	MI	46
2	GT1	2	(Germany) Vitaphone Racing Team	(Portugal) Miguel Ramos (Brazil) Alexandre Negrão	Maserati 6.0 L V12	MI	46
3	GT1	1	(Germany) Vitaphone Racing Team	(Germany) Michael Bartels (Italy) Andrea Bertolini	Maserati MC12 GT1	MI	46
3	GT1	1	(Germany) Vitaphone Racing Team	(Germany) Michael Bartels (Italy) Andrea Bertolini	Maserati 6.0 L V12	MI	46
4	GT1	4	(Belgium) Peka Racing	(Belgium) Anthony Kumpen (Belgium) Bert Longin	Saleen S7-R	P	46
4	GT1	4	(Belgium) Peka Racing	(Belgium) Anthony Kumpen (Belgium) Bert Longin	Ford 7.0 L V8	P	46
5	GT1	10	(United Kingdom) Gigawave Motorsport	(Austria) Philipp Peter (Denmark) Allan Simonsen	Aston Martin DBR9	MI	46
5	GT1	10	(United Kingdom) Gigawave Motorsport	(Austria) Philipp Peter (Denmark) Allan Simonsen	Aston Martin 6.0 L V12	MI	46
6	GT1	3	(Belgium) Selleslagh Racing Team	(France) Christophe Bouchut (Netherlands) Xavier Maassen	Chevrolet Corvette C6.R	MI	46
6	GT1	3	(Belgium) Selleslagh Racing Team	(France) Christophe Bouchut (Netherlands) Xavier Maassen	Chevrolet LS7R 7.0 L V8	MI	46
7	GT1	8	(Russia) IPB Spartak Racing (Germany) Reiter Engineering	(Netherlands) Peter Kox (Russia) Roman Rusinov	Lamborghini Murciélago R-GT	MI	46
7	GT1	8	(Russia) IPB Spartak Racing (Germany) Reiter Engineering	(Netherlands) Peter Kox (Russia) Roman Rusinov	Lamborghini 6.0 L V12	MI	46
8	**GT2**	**56**	**(United Kingdom) CR Scuderia Racing**	**(United Kingdom) Andrew Kirkaldy (United Kingdom) Rob Bell**	**Ferrari F430 GT2**	MI	**45**
8	**GT2**	**56**	**(United Kingdom) CR Scuderia Racing**	**(United Kingdom) Andrew Kirkaldy (United Kingdom) Rob Bell**	**Ferrari 4.0 L V8**	MI	**45**
9	GT2	50	(Italy) AF Corse	(Italy) Gianmaria Bruni (Finland) Toni Vilander	Ferrari F430 GT2	MI	45
9	GT2	50	(Italy) AF Corse	(Italy) Gianmaria Bruni (Finland) Toni Vilander	Ferrari 4.0 L V8	MI	45
10	GT2	61	(Belgium) Prospeed Competition	(France) Emmanuel Collard (United Kingdom) Richard Westbrook	Porsche 997 GT3-RSR	MI	45
10	GT2	61	(Belgium) Prospeed Competition	(France) Emmanuel Collard (United Kingdom) Richard Westbrook	Porsche 4.0 L Flat-6	MI	45
11	GT2	62	(United Kingdom) Scuderia Ecosse	(United Kingdom) Jamie Davies (Italy) Fabio Babini	Ferrari F430 GT2	P	45
11	GT2	62	(United Kingdom) Scuderia Ecosse	(United Kingdom) Jamie Davies (Italy) Fabio Babini	Ferrari 4.0 L V8	P	45
12	GT2	77	(Italy) BMS Scuderia Italia	(Italy) Paolo Ruberti (Italy) Matteo Malucelli	Ferrari F430 GT2	P	45
12	GT2	77	(Italy) BMS Scuderia Italia	(Italy) Paolo Ruberti (Italy) Matteo Malucelli	Ferrari 4.0 L V8	P	45
13	GT2	95	(Italy) Advanced Engineering (Argentina) PeCom Racing Team	(Argentina) Matías Russo (Argentina) Luís Pérez Companc	Ferrari F430 GT2	MI	45
13	GT2	95	(Italy) Advanced Engineering (Argentina) PeCom Racing Team	(Argentina) Matías Russo (Argentina) Luís Pérez Companc	Ferrari 4.0 L V8	MI	45
14	GT2	57	(Switzerland) Kessel Racing	(Switzerland) Henri Moser (Italy) Fabrizio del Monte	Ferrari F430 GT2	MI	43
14	GT2	57	(Switzerland) Kessel Racing	(Switzerland) Henri Moser (Italy) Fabrizio del Monte	Ferrari 4.0 L V8	MI	43
15	**G2**	**101**	**(Belgium) Belgian Racing**	**(Belgium) Bas Leinders (Belgium) Renaud Kuppens**	**Gillet Vertigo Streiff**	P	**42**
15	**G2**	**101**	**(Belgium) Belgian Racing**	**(Belgium) Bas Leinders (Belgium) Renaud Kuppens**	**Maserati 4.2 L V8**	P	**42**
16 DNF	GT1	6	(Germany) Phoenix Carsport Racing	(Netherlands) Mike Hezemans (Italy) Fabrizio Gollin	Chevrolet Corvette C6.R	MI	36
16 DNF	GT1	6	(Germany) Phoenix Carsport Racing	(Netherlands) Mike Hezemans (Italy) Fabrizio Gollin	Chevrolet LS7R 7.0 L V8	MI	36
17 DNF	GT2	66	(Germany) Team Felbermayr-Proton	(Germany) Marc Lieb (Austria) Horst Felbermayr Jr.	Porsche 997 GT3-RSR	MI	27
17 DNF	GT2	66	(Germany) Team Felbermayr-Proton	(Germany) Marc Lieb (Austria) Horst Felbermayr Jr.	Porsche 4.0 L Flat-6	MI	27
18 DNF	GT2	78	(Italy) BMS Scuderia Italia	(Switzerland) Joël Camathias (Italy) Davide Rigon	Ferrari F430 GT2	P	21
18 DNF	GT2	78	(Italy) BMS Scuderia Italia	(Switzerland) Joël Camathias (Italy) Davide Rigon	Ferrari 4.0 L V8	P	21
19 DNF	GT2	55	(United Kingdom) CR Scuderia Racing	(Canada) Chris Niarchos (United Kingdom) Tim Mullen	Ferrari F430 GT2	MI	17
19 DNF	GT2	55	(United Kingdom) CR Scuderia Racing	(Canada) Chris Niarchos (United Kingdom) Tim Mullen	Ferrari 4.0 L V8	MI	17
20 DNF	GT2	51	(Italy) AF Corse	(Italy) Thomas Biagi (San Marino) Christian Montanari	Ferrari F430 GT2	MI	16
20 DNF	GT2	51	(Italy) AF Corse	(Italy) Thomas Biagi (San Marino) Christian Montanari	Ferrari 4.0 L V8	MI	16
21 DNF	GT2	69	(Germany) Team Felbermayr-Proton	(Austria) Richard Lietz (Austria) Horst Felbermayr Sr.	Porsche 997 GT3-RSR	MI	15
21 DNF	GT2	69	(Germany) Team Felbermayr-Proton	(Austria) Richard Lietz (Austria) Horst Felbermayr Sr.	Porsche 4.0 L Flat-6	MI	15

=== Statistics ===
- Pole Position – #5 Phoenix Carsport Racing – 1:15.348
- Average Speed (Race 1) – 139.24 km/h (86.52 mph)
- Average Speed (Race 2) – 138.89 km/h (86.30 mph)

FIA GT Championship
Previous race: 2008 Spa 24 Hours	2008 season	Next race: 2008 FIA GT Brno 2 Hours
