= 2008 FIA GT Brno 2 Hours =

Layout of the Brno Circuit

The 2008 FIA GT Brno 2 Hours was the seventh race of the 2008 FIA GT Championship season. It took place at the Brno Circuit, Czech Republic, on 14 September 2008.

== Race results ==
Class winners in bold. Cars failing to complete 75% of winner's distance marked as Not Classified (NC). Cars with a C under their class are running in the Citation Cup, with the winner marked in bold italics.

Pos	Class	No	Team	Drivers	Chassis	Tyre	Laps
Pos	Class	No	Team	Drivers	Engine	Tyre	Laps
1	**GT1**	**33**	**(Austria) Jetalliance Racing**	**(Austria) Karl Wendlinger (United Kingdom) Ryan Sharp**	**Aston Martin DBR9**	MI	**62**
1	**GT1**	**33**	**(Austria) Jetalliance Racing**	**(Austria) Karl Wendlinger (United Kingdom) Ryan Sharp**	**Aston Martin 6.0 L V12**	MI	**62**
2	GT1	6	(Germany) Phoenix Carsport Racing	(Netherlands) Mike Hezemans (Italy) Fabrizio Gollin	Chevrolet Corvette C6.R	MI	62
2	GT1	6	(Germany) Phoenix Carsport Racing	(Netherlands) Mike Hezemans (Italy) Fabrizio Gollin	Chevrolet LS7R 7.0 L V8	MI	62
3	GT1	3	(Belgium) Selleslagh Racing Team	(France) Christophe Bouchut (Netherlands) Xavier Maassen	Chevrolet Corvette C6.R	MI	62
3	GT1	3	(Belgium) Selleslagh Racing Team	(France) Christophe Bouchut (Netherlands) Xavier Maassen	Chevrolet LS7R 7.0 L V8	MI	62
4	GT1	5	(Germany) Phoenix Carsport Racing	(Switzerland) Jean-Denis Délétraz (Switzerland) Marcel Fāssler	Chevrolet Corvette C6.R	MI	62
4	GT1	5	(Germany) Phoenix Carsport Racing	(Switzerland) Jean-Denis Délétraz (Switzerland) Marcel Fāssler	Chevrolet LS7R 7.0 L V8	MI	62
5	GT1	36	(Austria) Jetalliance Racing	(Austria) Lukas Lichtner-Hoyer (Germany) Alex Müller	Aston Martin DBR9	MI	62
5	GT1	36	(Austria) Jetalliance Racing	(Austria) Lukas Lichtner-Hoyer (Germany) Alex Müller	Aston Martin 6.0 L V12	MI	62
6	GT1	1	(Germany) Vitaphone Racing Team	(Germany) Michael Bartels (Italy) Andrea Bertolini	Maserati MC12 GT1	MI	62
6	GT1	1	(Germany) Vitaphone Racing Team	(Germany) Michael Bartels (Italy) Andrea Bertolini	Maserati 6.0 L V12	MI	62
7	GT1	2	(Germany) Vitaphone Racing Team	(Portugal) Miguel Ramos (Brazil) Alexandre Negrão	Maserati MC12 GT1	MI	62
7	GT1	2	(Germany) Vitaphone Racing Team	(Portugal) Miguel Ramos (Brazil) Alexandre Negrão	Maserati 6.0 L V12	MI	62
8	GT1	37	Escuderia ACA Argentina	(Argentina) Esteban Tuero (Argentina) Martín Basso	Ferrari 550-GTS Maranello	MI	61
8	GT1	37	Escuderia ACA Argentina	(Argentina) Esteban Tuero (Argentina) Martín Basso	Ferrari 5.9 L V12	MI	61
9	**GT2**	**50**	**(Italy) AF Corse**	**(Italy) Gianmaria Bruni (Finland) Toni Vilander**	**Ferrari F430 GT2**	MI	**60**
9	**GT2**	**50**	**(Italy) AF Corse**	**(Italy) Gianmaria Bruni (Finland) Toni Vilander**	**Ferrari 4.0 L V8**	MI	**60**
10	GT2	79	(Czech Republic) K plus K Motorsport	(Czech Republic) Jiří Janák (Germany) Tim Bergmeister	Porsche 997 GT3-RSR	MI	60
10	GT2	79	(Czech Republic) K plus K Motorsport	(Czech Republic) Jiří Janák (Germany) Tim Bergmeister	Porsche 3.8 L Flat-6	MI	60
11	GT2	77	(Italy) BMS Scuderia Italia	(Italy) Paolo Ruberti (Italy) Matteo Malucelli	Ferrari F430 GT2	P	59
11	GT2	77	(Italy) BMS Scuderia Italia	(Italy) Paolo Ruberti (Italy) Matteo Malucelli	Ferrari 4.0 L V8	P	59
12	GT2	51	(Italy) AF Corse	(Italy) Thomas Biagi (San Marino) Christian Montanari	Ferrari F430 GT2	MI	59
12	GT2	51	(Italy) AF Corse	(Italy) Thomas Biagi (San Marino) Christian Montanari	Ferrari 4.0 L V8	MI	59
13	GT2	60	(Belgium) Prospeed Competition	(Finland) Markus Palttala (Finland) Mikael Forsten	Porsche 997 GT3-RSR	MI	59
13	GT2	60	(Belgium) Prospeed Competition	(Finland) Markus Palttala (Finland) Mikael Forsten	Porsche 4.0 L Flat-6	MI	59
14	GT2	95	(Italy) Advanced Engineering (Argentina) PeCom Racing Team	(Argentina) Matías Russo (Argentina) Luís Pérez Companc	Ferrari F430 GT2	MI	59
14	GT2	95	(Italy) Advanced Engineering (Argentina) PeCom Racing Team	(Argentina) Matías Russo (Argentina) Luís Pérez Companc	Ferrari 4.0 L V8	MI	59
15	GT2	57	(Switzerland) Kessel Racing	(Switzerland) Henri Moser (Italy) Fabrizio del Monte	Ferrari F430 GT2	MI	59
15	GT2	57	(Switzerland) Kessel Racing	(Switzerland) Henri Moser (Italy) Fabrizio del Monte	Ferrari 4.0 L V8	MI	59
16	GT2	62	(United Kingdom) Scuderia Ecosse	(United Kingdom) Jamie Davies (Italy) Fabio Babini	Ferrari F430 GT2	P	59
16	GT2	62	(United Kingdom) Scuderia Ecosse	(United Kingdom) Jamie Davies (Italy) Fabio Babini	Ferrari 4.0 L V8	P	59
17	GT2	55	(United Kingdom) CR Scuderia Racing	(Canada) Chris Niarchos (United Kingdom) Tim Mullen	Ferrari F430 GT2	MI	59
17	GT2	55	(United Kingdom) CR Scuderia Racing	(Canada) Chris Niarchos (United Kingdom) Tim Mullen	Ferrari 4.0 L V8	MI	59
18	GT2	78	(Italy) BMS Scuderia Italia	(Switzerland) Joël Camathias (Italy) Davide Rigon	Ferrari F430 GT2	P	59
18	GT2	78	(Italy) BMS Scuderia Italia	(Switzerland) Joël Camathias (Italy) Davide Rigon	Ferrari 4.0 L V8	P	59
19	**GT1; C**	**12**	**(Austria) AT Racing (Austria) Renauer Motorsport Team**	**(Belarus) Alexander Talkanitsa (Germany) Wolfgang Kaufmann**	**Chevrolet Corvette C5-R**	MI	**59**
19	**GT1; C**	**12**	**(Austria) AT Racing (Austria) Renauer Motorsport Team**	**(Belarus) Alexander Talkanitsa (Germany) Wolfgang Kaufmann**	**Chevrolet LS7R 7.0 L V8**	MI	**59**
20	**G2**	**101**	**(Belgium) Belgian Racing**	**(Belgium) Bas Leinders (Belgium) Renaud Kuppens**	**Gillet Vertigo Streiff**	P	**58**
20	**G2**	**101**	**(Belgium) Belgian Racing**	**(Belgium) Bas Leinders (Belgium) Renaud Kuppens**	**Maserati 4.2 L V8**	P	**58**
21	GT2	59	(United Kingdom) Trackspeed Racing	(United Kingdom) David Ashburn (United Kingdom) Richard Williams	Porsche 997 GT3-RSR	MI	58
21	GT2	59	(United Kingdom) Trackspeed Racing	(United Kingdom) David Ashburn (United Kingdom) Richard Williams	Porsche 4.0 L Flat-6	MI	58
22	GT2	88	(Slovakia) Autoracing Club Bratislava	(Slovakia) Miro Konopka (Australia) Karl Reindler	Porsche 997 GT3-RSR	MI	57
22	GT2	88	(Slovakia) Autoracing Club Bratislava	(Slovakia) Miro Konopka (Australia) Karl Reindler	Porsche 3.8 L Flat-6	MI	57
23 DNF	GT2	61	(Belgium) Prospeed Competition	(France) Emmanuel Collard (United Kingdom) Richard Westbrook	Porsche 997 GT3-RSR	MI	34
23 DNF	GT2	61	(Belgium) Prospeed Competition	(France) Emmanuel Collard (United Kingdom) Richard Westbrook	Porsche 4.0 L Flat-6	MI	34
24 DNF	GT2	56	(United Kingdom) CR Scuderia Racing	(United Kingdom) Andrew Kirkaldy (Germany) Dirk Müller	Ferrari F430 GT2	MI	1
24 DNF	GT2	56	(United Kingdom) CR Scuderia Racing	(United Kingdom) Andrew Kirkaldy (Germany) Dirk Müller	Ferrari 4.0 L V8	MI	1
25 DNF	GT1	4	(Belgium) Peka Racing	(Belgium) Anthony Kumpen (Belgium) Bert Longin	Saleen S7-R	P	1
25 DNF	GT1	4	(Belgium) Peka Racing	(Belgium) Anthony Kumpen (Belgium) Bert Longin	Ford 7.0 L V8	P	1
26 DNF	GT1	10	(United Kingdom) Gigawave Motorsport	(Austria) Philipp Peter (Denmark) Allan Simonsen	Aston Martin DBR9	MI	1
26 DNF	GT1	10	(United Kingdom) Gigawave Motorsport	(Austria) Philipp Peter (Denmark) Allan Simonsen	Aston Martin 6.0 L V12	MI	1
DNS	GT1	13	(Austria) Team Rbimmo / B-Racing (Germany) Konrad Motorsport	(Italy) Andrea Piccini (Austria) Bernhard Auinger	Saleen S7-R	P	–
DNS	GT1	13	(Austria) Team Rbimmo / B-Racing (Germany) Konrad Motorsport	(Italy) Andrea Piccini (Austria) Bernhard Auinger	Ford 7.0 L V8	P	–

== Statistics ==
- Pole Position – #33 Jetalliance Racing – 1:51.675
- Average Speed – 167.04 km/h (103.79 mph)

FIA GT Championship
Previous race: 2008 FIA GT Bucharest 2 Hours	2008 season	Next race: 2008 FIA GT Nogaro 2 Hours
