= Jetalliance =

Austrian airline

Jetalliance Flugbetriebs GesmbH
IATA	ICAO	Call sign
–	JAG	JETALLIANCE
- Founded: 1996
- Ceased operations: 2013
- Hubs: Vienna International Airport
- Fleet size: 14
- Destinations: Europe, North America
- Headquarters: Oberwaltersdorf, Lower Austria, Austria
- Website: jetalliance.at

Jetalliance Flugbetriebs GesmbH was a business aviation provider based in Oberwaltersdorf (near Vienna), Austria. It was established and started operations in 1996 and devoted itself to operate an extensive business jet activity. Its main operational base was Vienna International Airport.

== History ==
The airline operated under JAR OPS 1 in Europe, but was also FAA part 129 certified, allowing it to fly commercially in the US and Canada.

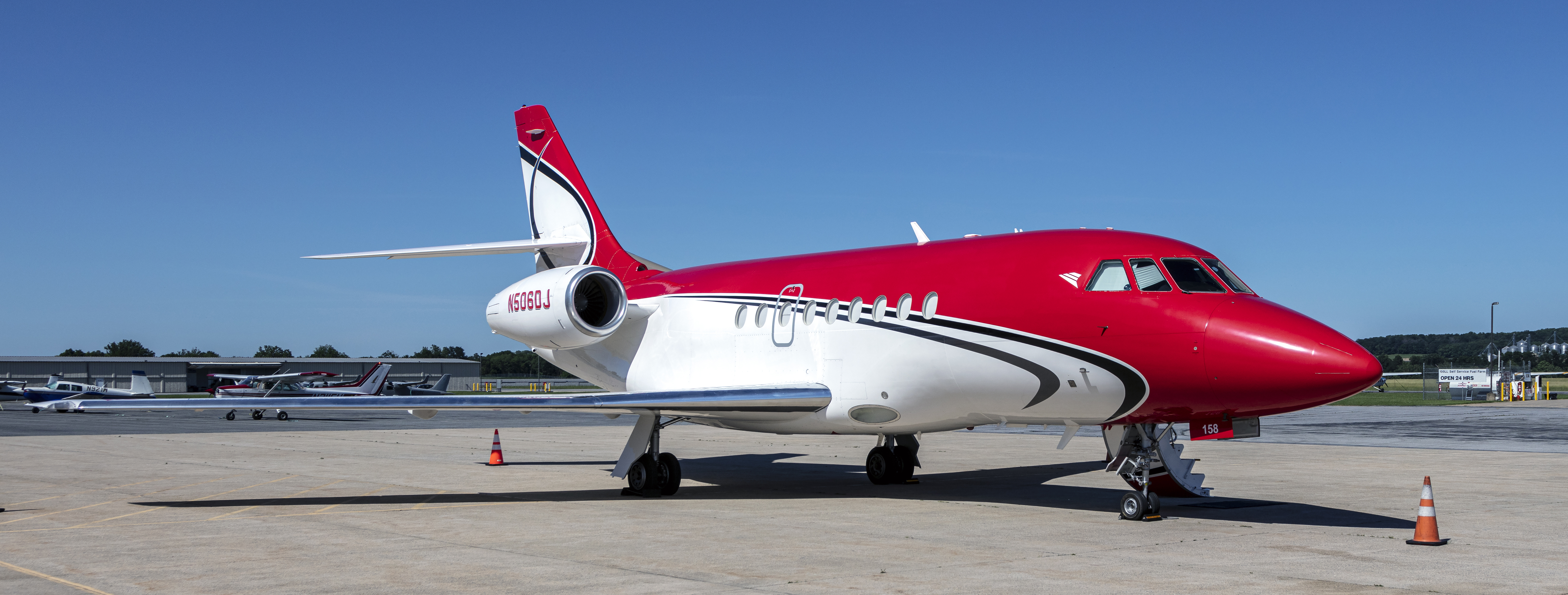
Dassault Falcon 2000

In December 2005, a Dassault Falcon 2000 joined the growing fleet of Jetalliance when it was delivered brand new from the manufacturer In 2006 the company announced orders for an Airbus A319 Corporate Jet and an Airbus A318 Elite jetliner. In January 2006 the airline announced an order for 28 aircraft of the Cessna Citation family. Jetalliance has ordered two further Airbus A318 Elite aircraft (following the initial order for a single aircraft in June 2006) and wanted to furnish them with a 14-seat deluxe interior.

In November 2012, the company filed for bankruptcy, the claims amounted to approximately €28.9 millions. In October 2013, it was decided to close down and liquidate the company.

== Fleet ==
The Jetalliance fleet included the following aircraft (as of 10 September 2008):

- 2 Bombardier Challenger 850
- 1 Bombardier Learjet 60
- 3 Cessna CitationJet
- 1 Cessna Citation Ultra
- 3 Cessna Citation X
- 3 Cessna Citation XLS
- 1 Dassault Falcon 50EX
- 1 Dassault Falcon 900B
- 2 Dassault Falcon 2000
- 2 Embraer ERJ-135 Legacy
- 1 Gulfstream G550
- 1 Gulfstream GIV
- 1 Raytheon Beechjet 400A

=== On order ===
- 3 Airbus A318 Elite
- 1 Airbus A319CJ
- 2 Cessna Citation X

=== Previously operated ===
The airline operated the following aircraft in 2005:

- 1 Bombardier Learjet 45
- 1 Dornier 328JET
- 1 Gulfstream V
- 1 McDonnell Douglas MD-83
- 2 Raytheon Beechjet 400A

== See also ==
- JetAlliance Racing
