= José Manuel Balbiani =

Argentine racing driver (born 1978)

- Nationality: Argentina
- Born: 6 January 1978 (age 48) Buenos Aires, Argentina
- Categorisation: FIA Silver (until 2016); FIA Bronze (2017–)

José Manuel Balbiani (born January 6, 1978) is an Argentine racing driver. He has run in different series, with major success in FIA GT Championship.

Balbiani was born in Buenos Aires.
