= Jetalliance Racing =

Austrian racing team

(Austria) Jetalliance Racing
- Founded: 2006
- Team principal(s): Lukas Lichtner-Hoyer
- Former series: FIA GT Championship; Le Mans Series; FIA GT4 European Cup; Intercontinental Le Mans Cup

Jetalliance Racing is an Austrian racing team which currently competes in the FIA GT Championship. Founded by Lukas Lichtner-Hoyer, former CEO of Jetalliance airlines, in 2006 under the name Race Alliance Motorsport, the team has run two privateer Aston Martin DBR9s in FIA GT as well as making appearances in other racing series. Lichtner-Hoyer is one of the team's four drivers, joined by Karl Wendlinger, Ryan Sharp and Alex Müller.

== Racing History ==
=== 2006 ===
Debuting in the 2006 season, the team would be amongst the earliest customers of the new DBR9s, running two cars with Red Bull backing for a majority of Austrian drivers, such as Karl Wendlinger and Philipp Peter. The team would also occasionally employ a Porsche 911 GT3-RSR for competition in the smaller GT2 class as well as a BMW M3 GTR for the Spa 24 Hours. The Aston Martins would struggle, with Wendlinger and Peter's car being the only one for the team to score points all season. However the team would manage one victory at Mugello. This helped the team gain a sixth place in the team's championship, while Peter and Wendlinger would tie for 14th in the driver's standings.

=== 2007 ===
2007 saw improvement from the renamed team, even though they lost the backing of their primary sponsor Red Bull. Ryan Sharp replaced Peter while the team would abandon their Porsche to fully concentrate on the Aston Martins. A second victory would come at Monza, followed by the team leading early in the Spa 24 Hours before mechanical issues forced them to drop out. The team would improve to fourth in the championship following another victory in Italy, this time at Adria. At the next round of the FIA GT Championship in Brno Wendlinger qualified the #33 DBR9 in third place and finished in second place behind the #2 Vitaphone Racing MC12. At the penultimate race of the 2007 season in Nogaro the #33 car got beaten in qualifying for the first time by the #36 car driven by Robert Lechner. Lechner qualified the #36 car in second place behind the #1 Vitaphone Racing MC12 of Thomas Biagi, the gap between the two cars was 0.000 seconds (Biagi was on pole because he did his lap before Lechner). Meanwhile, Wendlinger had qualified the #33 car in third place. The results from Nogaro for the two Jetalliance cars were: fifth place for the #33 car with Wendlinger and Sharp and ninth for Lechner and Lichtner-Hoyer. The last race of the 2007 FIA GT Championship season was in Zolder, during qualifying the #36 car first jumped into pole position only to beaten by his teammate in the #33 car, Karl Wendlinger who was 0.716 seconds quicker than Lechner who ended up in third place behind the #12 Playteam Sarafree MC12. The results of the last race at Zolder were: #33 Wendlinger/Sharp in first place and the #36 car with Lechner/Lichtner-Hoyer in ninth place partly due to Lechner spinning when exiting one of the corners early on in the race.

With the season over and all the points had been calculated Karl Wendlinger and Ryan Sharp finished in joint second place in the Drivers Championship with fifty-seven points, four points behind the Drivers Champion Thomas Biagi in the #1 Vitaphone Racing MC12. Robert Lechner and Lukas Lichtner-Hoyer finished in joint thirty-second place with Ferdinando Monfardini of Aston Martin Racing BMS with eight points. Jetalliance Racing finished in third place in the Teams Championship with fifty points, three points behind second place team Scuderia Playteam Sarafree and fifty-five points behind Vitaphone Racing.

Jetalliance also chose to participate in their first Le Mans Series event in 2007, the 1000km of Spa. Lichtner-Hoyer and Thomas Grüber joined Wendlinger in a single DBR9, managing to finish 13th overall and fifth in class.

=== 2008 ===
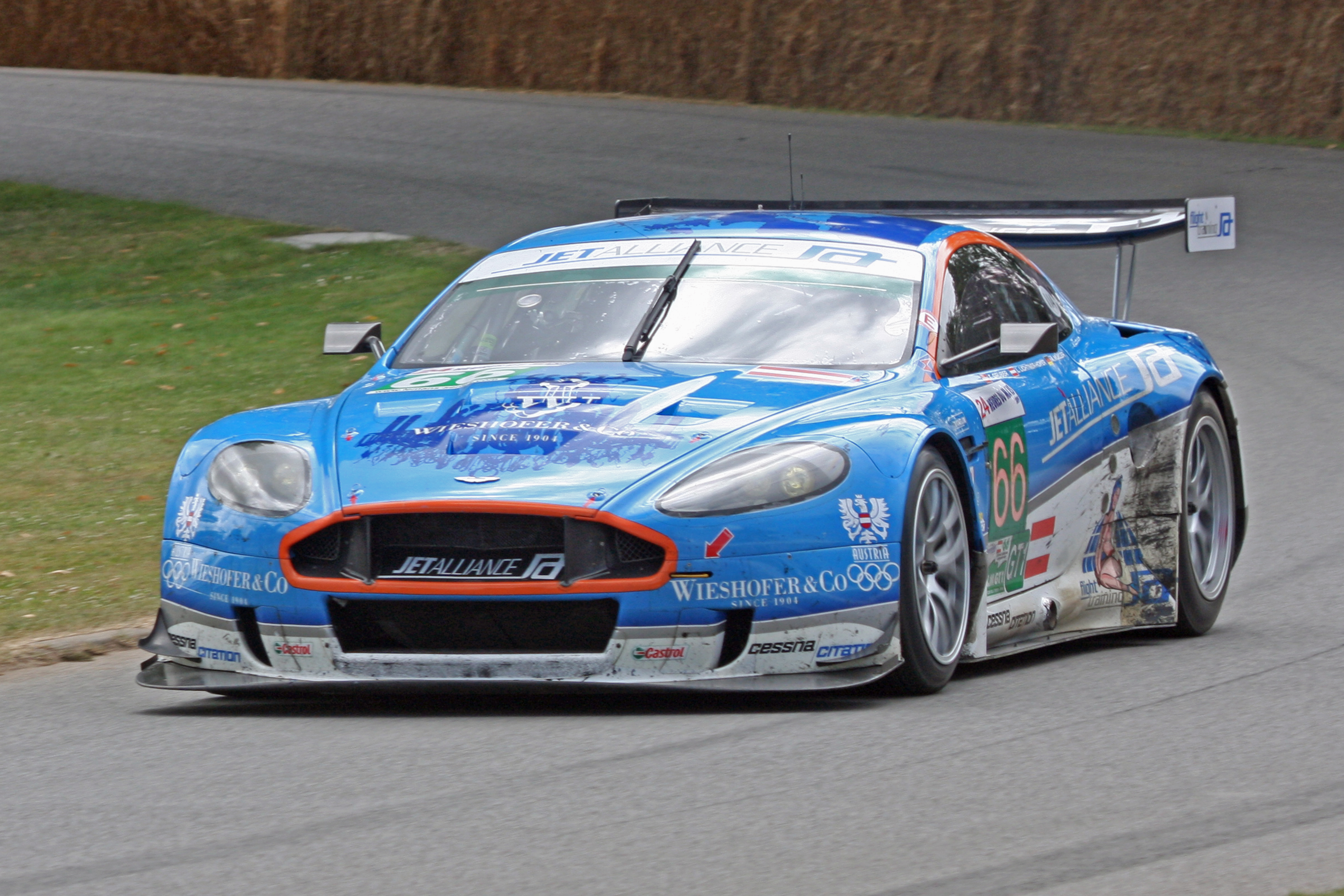
Jetalliance's 2008-spec DBR9, pictured a year later at Goodwood.

Jetalliance purchased four Aston Martin V8 Vantage N24's in late 2007 and raced them in the 2008 FIA GT4 European Cup.

Jetalliance ran a Porsche 996-RSR at the Dubai 24 Hour in January 2008 with the driving seat be filled by: Karl Wendlinger, Lukas Lichtner-Hoyer, Vitus Eckert, Klaus Engelhorn and Ryan Sharp who was entered to drive the Porsche at the last minute. They failed to finish due to gearbox failure, seventeen hours into the race.

Jetalliance will return to the FIA GT in 2008 with two Aston Martin DBR9's, numbered 33 and 36 like they were in 2007. Car #33 will be driven by last years drive pairing of Karl Wendlinger and Ryan Sharp. Lichtner-Hoyer will once again pilot the #36 car, but will not be paired with Robert Lechner, but with Alex Müller. Jetalliance have partnered up with the Austrian Olympic Committee for the 2008 season and will be carrying new logos on both cars to show this relationship.

== Season overviews ==
=== FIA GT Championship 2006 ===
#32 DBR9

- Starts: 1
- Pole Positions: 0
- Wins: 0
- Highest Placed Finish: 29th
- DNF's: 1

#33 DBR9

- Starts: 10
- Pole Positions: 0
- Wins: 1
- Highest Placed Finish: 1st
- DNF's: 5

#99 911 GT3-RSR

- Starts: 6
- Pole Positions: 0
- Wins: 0
- Highest Placed Finish: 17th
- DNF's: 2

#199 M3 GTR

- Starts: 1
- Pole Positions: 0
- Wins: 0
- Highest Placed Finish: 22nd
- DNF's: 0

- Karl Wendlinger & Philipp Peter finished 14th in the GT1 Drivers Championship.
- Jaroslav Janiš finished 3rd in the GT1 Drivers Championship (Drove for Race Alliance In Rd10).
- Christophe Bouchut finished 23rd in the GT1 Drivers Championship (Drove for Race Alliance In Rd4).
- Robert Lechner finished in 34th in the GT1 Drivers Championship.
- Race Alliance Motorsport finished 6th in the GT1 Teams Championship.

=== FIA GT Championship 2007 ===
#33 DBR9

- Starts: 10
- Pole Positions: 3
- Wins: 3
- Highest Placed Finish: 1st
- DNF's: 2

#36 DBR9

- Starts: 9
- Pole Positions: 0
- Wins: 0
- Highest Placed Finish: 7th
- DNF's: 2

- Karl Wendlinger & Ryan Sharp finished 2nd in the Drivers Championship.
- Robert Lechner & Lukas Lichter-Hoyer finished 32nd in the Drivers Championship.
- Jetalliance Racing finished 3rd in the Teams Championship.

== Racing record ==
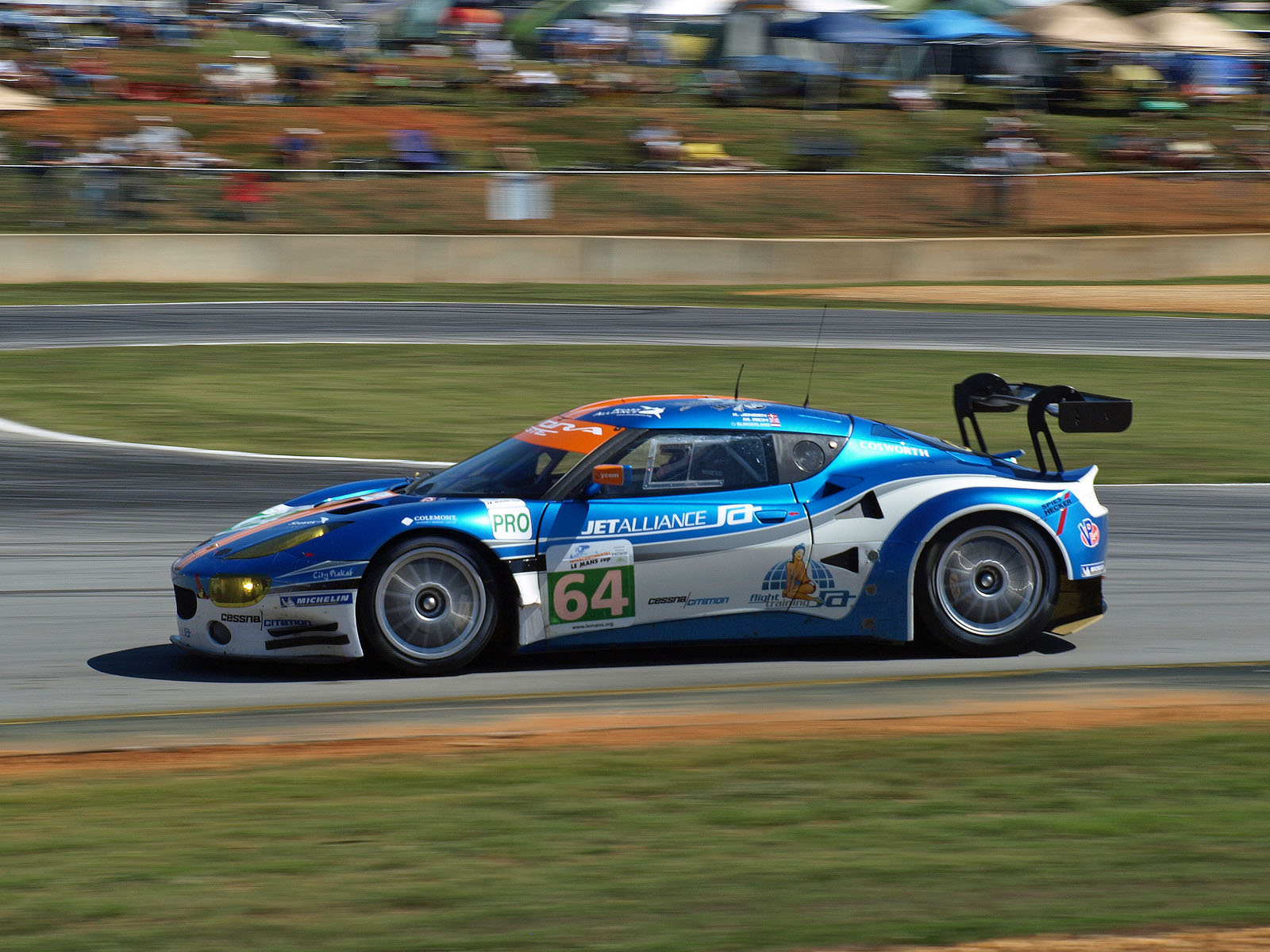
Jetalliance's Lotus Evora at the 2011 Petit Le Mans.

=== 24 Hours of Le Mans results ===
Year	Entrant	No.	Car	Drivers	Class	Laps	Pos.	Class Pos.
2009	(Austria) Jetalliance Racing	66	Aston Martin DBR9	(Austria) Thomas Gruber (Austria) Lukas Lichtner-Hoyer (Germany) Alex Müller	LMGT1	294	31st	3rd
2011	(Austria) Lotus Jetalliance	64	Lotus Evora GTE	(United Kingdom) John Hartshorne (United Kingdom) Martin Rich (Netherlands) Oskar Slingerland	LMGTE Pro	126	DNF	DNF
2011	(Austria) Lotus Jetalliance	65	Lotus Evora GTE	(Switzerland) Jonathan Hirschi (United Kingdom) Johnny Mowlem (United Kingdom) James Rossiter	LMGTE Pro	295	22nd	7th

== See also ==
- Jetalliance
