= Bert Longin =

Belgian racing driver (born 1965)

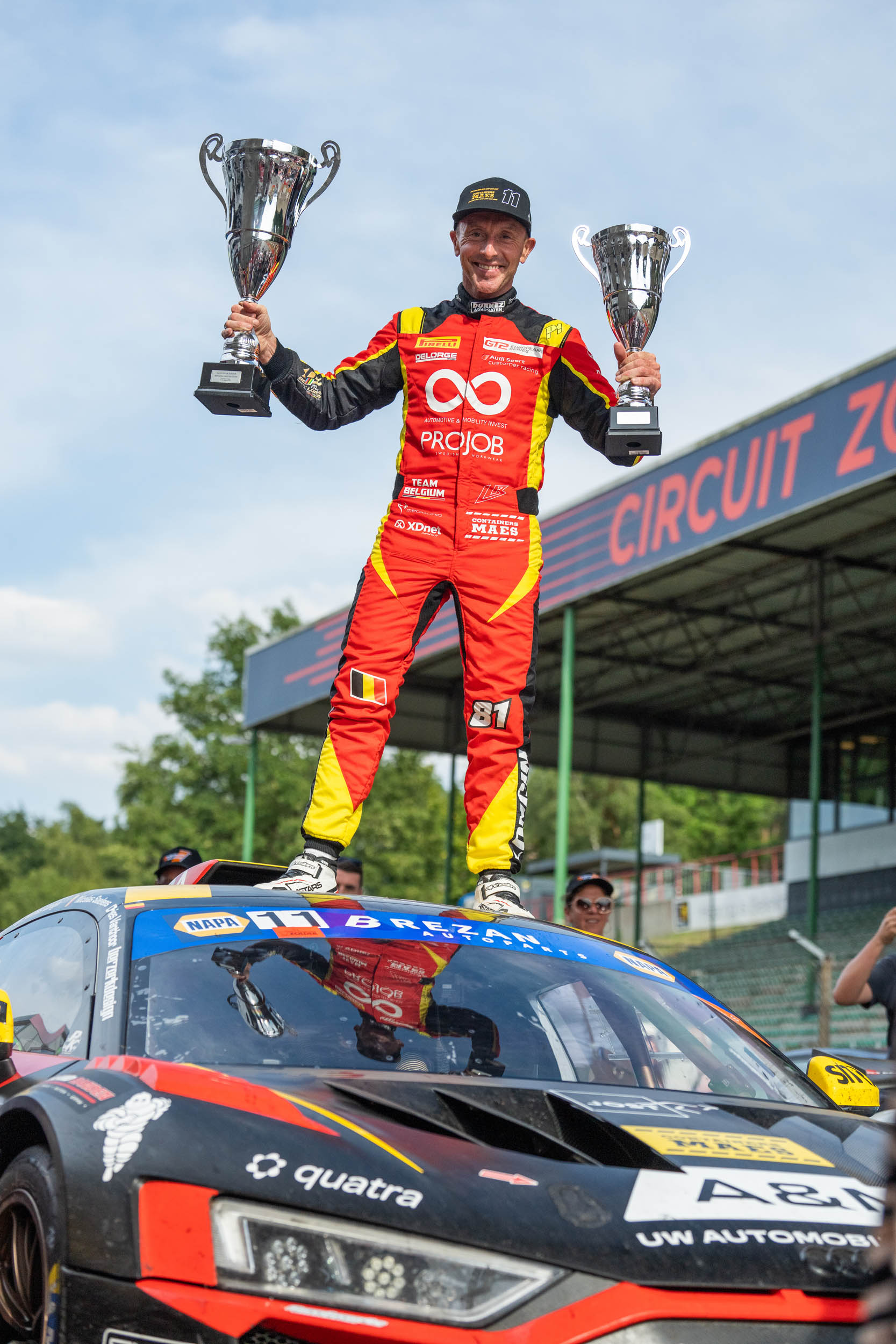
- Longin in 2022
- Nationality: (Belgium) Belgian
- Born: 26 October 1965 (age 61) Rotselaar, Belgium
- Relatives: Stienes Longin (son)
- Categorisation: FIA Gold (until 2015); FIA Silver (2016–2020); FIA Bronze (2021–)

Championship titles
- 2002–2004, 2006, 2013, 2022–2023: Belcar

Bert Longin (born 26 October 1965) is a Belgian racing driver who last competed for HAAS RT in the Middle East Trophy.

== Personal life ==
Longin is the father of Stienes Longin, who is also a racing driver. Longin is also the CEO of Longin Service.

== Career ==
Longin began racing in 1996 in the Zolder Touring Cup, following a test drive offered by a friend, a year in which he also won the Zolder 10 Hours. The following year, Longin began racing in Belcar Endurance Championship with AD Sport, racing with them until 2000, as well as debuting at the 24 Hours of Daytona in 1998 and making a one-off appearance in the 2000 FIA GT Championship at Zolder.

Joining GLPK Racing for 2001, Longin continued racing mainly in the Belcar Endurance Championship, which he won overall in 2002, as well as the 24 Hours of Zolder the same year. Longin also continued racing part-time in the FIA GT Championship in the N-GT class, in which he most notably scored a class podium at the 2002 Spa 24 Hours for Freisinger Motorsport. Longin then won the following two editions of the 24 Hours of Zolder for GLPK Racing, whilst also racing full-time in the FIA GT Championship for Freisinger Motorsport in the N-GT class in 2003, before switching to the GT class in 2004 with JMB Racing.

Remaining with GLPK Racing as they stepped up to the FIA GT Championship in 2005, Longin won at Imola and Zhuhai as well as taking four more podiums to end the year sixth in points. Longin's second season with the team in FIA GT Championship proved to be less successful, only winning at Le Castellet and taking four more podiums to secure seventh in points, whilst also securing his fourth overall Belcar title with the same team. Two more years with PK Carsport then ensued, yielding a GT3 class title in Belcar in 2007, as well as six podiums and a win at San Luis in 2008 in the FIA GT Championship.

Longin switched to Selleslagh Racing Team for the 2009 FIA GT Championship season alongside James Ruffier, taking a lone win at Algarve and a third-place finish at Le Castellet to secure third in points. As FIA GT rebranded to the FIA GT1 World Championship the following year, Longin joined Team Hegersport for his only season in the series, enduring a tough year as he scored points only four times with a best result of fourth at Silverstone. That year, Longin also raced in the Belcar Endurance Championship, in which he scored his fourth 24 Hours of Zolder win in August.

Switching to Blancpain Endurance Series for 2011 and joining WRT, Longin finished second three times to secure third in points, as well as finishing runner-up in the GT3 standings of the Belcar Endurance Championship and winning the Zolder 24 Hours overall for the fifth time. The following year Longin returned to the series, as he switched to Marc VDS Racing Team, joining Mike Hezemans and Henri Moser. In his sophomore season in the series, Longin scored a best result of sixth at Le Castellet, as he ended the year 13th in the Pro standings.

Following a year in International GT Open in which he scored a lone class win at Le Castellet and winning his fifth Belcar Endurance Championship title, Longin returned to PK Carsport to race in the Elite 1 class of the 2014 NASCAR Whelen Euro Series. In his first season in the series, Longin qualified on pole on debut at Valencia, a round in which he scored his best results of the season by finishing second and third in the two races, en route to a sixth-place points finish. The same year, Longin finished second overall and first in the Prototype 1 class of the Zolder 24 Hours.

Two more seasons in the NASCAR Whelen Euro Series for PK Carsport then ensued, in which he finished 12th in 2015, taking a best result of fourth at Magione, and fifth in 2016 with a best result of third in race one in Adria, in what was his last full-time season in Elite 1. In 2016, Longin also competed in the LMP3 class of the European Le Mans Series for Race Performance, taking a best result of sixth twice to finish 13th in the class standings.

After racing locally in 2017 and running a limited schedule in the 2018 NASCAR Whelen Euro Series and Belcar Endurance Championships, Longin returned to full-time competition the following year, racing in both Ford Fiesta Sprint Cup and Belcar Endurance Championship. In both series, Longin was runner-up in points, and also took his sixth win at the 24 Hours of Zolder in the latter.

Longin then raced part-time in Belcar the following year, before returning to PK Carsport to race in the Pro-Am class of the 2021 GT2 European Series. In his first season in the series, Longin scored his maiden win at Monza, before scoring further wins at Misano and Spa to secure runner-up honors in points. Returning to the series and team the following year, scoring a best result of second in class at the Red Bull Ring en route to a third-place points finish. During 2022, Longin also scored his seventh 24 Hours of Zolder win as well as his sixth Belcar Endurance Championship title.

In 2023, Longin returned to full-time competition in the Belcar Endurance Championship, scoring his seventh and final title with PK Carsport. Longin then competed part-time in Belcar the following year, winning the season-finale at Zolder and announcing his retirement from full-time motorsport, before making a one-off appearance in the 2025 Middle East Trophy for HAAS RT at the Dubai 24 Hour.

== Racing record ==
=== Racing career summary ===
Season	Series	Team	Races	Wins	Poles	F/Laps	Podiums	Points	Position
1997	Belcar Endurance Championship – GT		3				2		
1997	24 Hours of Zolder		1	0	0	0	1	—N/a	**2nd**
1998	24 Hours of Daytona – GT2	AD Sport	1	0	0	0	0	—N/a	DNF
1998	Belcar Endurance Championship – GT1	AD Sport	6				1		
1998	24 Hours of Zolder	AD Sport	1	0	0	0	0	—N/a	19th
1999	Belcar Endurance Championship – GT1	AD Sport	5	1			2		
1999	24 Hours of Zolder	AD Sport	1	0	0	0	0	—N/a	7th
2000	Belcar Endurance Championship – GTA	AD Sport; Trommelke	8	1			7	468	**3rd**
2000	24 Hours of Zolder	AD Sport	1	0	0	0	1	—N/a	**3rd**
2000	FIA GT Championship – GT	Freisinger Motorsport	1	0	0	0	0	3	21st
2001	Belcar Endurance Championship – GTA	GLPK Racing	8	2			2		
2001	24 Hours of Zolder	GLPK Racing	1	0	0	0	0	—N/a	DNF
2001	FIA GT Championship – GT	GLPK Racing	2	0	0	0	0	2	32nd
2002	Belcar Endurance Championship – GTA	GLPK Racing	6	2			6	397	**1st**
2002	24 Hours of Zolder	GLPK Racing	1	1	0	0	1	—N/a	**1st**
2002	FIA GT Championship – N-GT	Freisinger Motorsport	7	0	0	0	1	17	15th
2003	FIA GT Championship – N-GT	Freisinger Motorsport	10	0	0	0	1	19	12th
2003	Belcar Endurance Championship – GTA	GLPK Racing	4	1			1		
2003	24 Hours of Zolder	GLPK Racing	1	1	0	0	1	—N/a	**1st**
2003	Supercar Challenge – GT		1	1	0	0	1	20	18th
2004	FIA GT Championship – GT	JMB Racing	11	0	0	0	0	13.5	18th
2004	Le Mans Endurance Series – GT	JMB Racing	1	0	0	0	0	4	22nd
2004	Mini Cooper Challenge Belgium	G&A Motors					3	104	7th
2004	Belcar Endurance Championship – GTA	GLPK Racing	7	4			6		
2004	24 Hours of Zolder	GLPK Racing	1	1	0	0	1	—N/a	**1st**
2005	Belcar Endurance Championship – GTA	GLPK Racing	4	0			1		
2005	24 Hours of Zolder	GLPK Racing	1	0	0	0	0	—N/a	DNF
2005	FIA GT Championship – GT1	GLPK-Carsport	11	2	0	0	5	52	6th
2006	FIA GT Championship – GT1	GLPK-Carsport	11	1	0	0	5	48	7th
2006	Belcar Endurance Championship – GTA	GLPK Racing	7	5			6		**1st**
2006	24 Hours of Zolder	GLPK Racing	1	0	0	0	1	—N/a	**3rd**
2007	FIA GT Championship – GT1	PK Carsport	10	0	0	0	5	43.5	7th
2007	Belcar Endurance Championship – GT3	PK Carsport	6	2			3		**1st**
2007	24 Hours of Zolder	PK Carsport	1	0	0	0	0	—N/a	DNF
2008	FIA GT Championship – GT1	PekaRacing nv	11	1	0	0	1	18.5	11th
2008	Belcar Endurance Championship – GT3	Gravity Racing International	8	4			4	90	13th
2008	24 Hours of Zolder	Gravity Racing International	1	0	0	0	0	—N/a	DNF
2009	FIA GT Championship – GT1	Selleslagh Racing Team	8	1	0	0	2	38	**3rd**
2009	24 Hours of Zolder	Selleslagh Racing Team	1	0	0	0	0	—N/a	19th
2009	Belcar Endurance Championship – GT3	First Motorsport; Selleslagh Racing Team	11	2			8	148	**3rd**
2010	FIA GT1 World Championship	Triple H Team Hegersport	13	0	0	0	1	24	28th
2010	24 Hours of Spa – GT2	AF Corse	1	0	0	0	0	—N/a	DNF
2010	Belcar Endurance Championship – D1C1	First Motorsport 1 W Racing Team	7	2			4		
2010	24 Hours of Zolder	First Motorsport 1	1	1	0	0	1	—N/a	**1st**
2011	Blancpain Endurance Series – GT3 Pro	WRT Belgian Audi Club	5	0	0	0	3	74	**3rd**
2011	Belcar Endurance Championship – GT3	WRT Belgian Audi Club	6	1	1	0	3	40	**2nd**
2012	Blancpain Endurance Series – GT3 Pro	Marc VDS Racing Team	6	0	0	0	0	31	13th
2012	Supercar Challenge – Super GT	Veka Racing	16	0	0	0	6	190	6th
2012	Supercar Challenge – Supersport	AB Racing Team	4	0	0	0	0	12	20th
2013	International GT Open – Super GT	V8 Racing	14	1	0	0	7	56	8th
2013	Porsche GT3 Cup Challenge Benelux – Cup	First Motorsport	12	0	0	0	4	137	6th
2013	24 Hours of Zolder – D1C1	WRT Belgian Audi Club	1	0	0	0	1	—N/a	**2nd**
2014	NASCAR Whelen Euro Series – Elite 1	PK Carsport	12	0	1	0	2	573	6th
2014	GT4 European Series – GTPE	PK Carsport	2	0	0	0	0	0	NC†
2014	24 Hours of Zolder – Prototype 1	Wolf Racing Cars	1	1	0	0	1	—N/a	**1st**
2015	NASCAR Whelen Euro Series – Elite 1	PK Carsport	12	0	0	0	0	509	12th
2016	NASCAR Whelen Euro Series – Elite 1	PK Carsport	11	0	0	0	1	535	5th
2016	European Le Mans Series – LMP3	Race Performance	6	0	0	0	0	22.5	13th
2018	NASCAR Whelen Euro Series – Elite 1	Alex Caffi Motorsport	2	0	0	0	0	60	38th
2018	NASCAR Whelen Euro Series – Elite 1	PK Carsport	1	0	0	0	0	60	38th
2018	Belcar Endurance Championship	PK Carsport; Heinz Powerkit by Wolf Racing	6	0	0	0	0	111.5	12th
2019	Ford Fiesta Sprint Cup Benelux	Garage Feyaerts	12	4	2	1	6	181	**2nd**
2019	Belcar Endurance Championship	Krafft Racing	7					200.5	**2nd**
2019	NASCAR Whelen Euro Series – Elite 2	PK Carsport	4	0	0	0	0	90	31st
2020	Belcar Endurance Championship	Krafft Racing	1			1	1	0	NC
2021	6 Hours of Abu Dhabi – TG	PK Carsport	1	0	0	0	1	—N/a	**3rd**
2021	24H TCE Series – TCX	PK Carsport	1	1	0	0	1	29	4th
2021	GT2 European Series – Pro-Am	PK Carsport	10	3	3	0	8	174	**2nd**
2022	24H GT Series – GTX	PK Carsport	1	1	0	0	1	29	NC
2022	GT2 European Series – Pro-Am	PK Carsport	12	0	0	0	7	143	**3rd**
2022	Belcar Endurance Championship – Belcar GTA	PK Carsport	5	4	1	0	5	148	**1st**
2022	24 Hours of Zolder	PK Carsport	1	1	0	0	1	—N/a	**1st**
2023	24H GT Series – 992 Am	PK Carsport	1	0	0	0	1	36	NC
2023	Belcar Endurance Championship	PK Carsport							**1st**
2025	Middle East Trophy – GT3 Am	HAAS RT	1	0	0	0	0	12	NC

^{†} As Longin was a guest driver, he was ineligible to score points.

=== Complete FIA GT Championship results ===
(key) (Races in bold indicate pole position) (Races in italics indicate fastest lap)

Year	Team	Car	Class	1	2	3	4	5	6	7	8	9	10	11	12	13	Pos.	Pts
2000	Freisinger Motorsport	Porsche 911 GT2	GT	VAL	EST	MNZ	SIL	HUN	ZOL; 4	A1R	LAU	BRN	MAG				21st	3
2001	GLPK Racing	Chrysler Viper GTS-R	GT	MNZ	BRN	MAG	SIL	ZOL	HUN	SPA; 6H ?	SPA; 12H ?	SPA; 24H; 6	A1R	NÜR	JAR	EST; Ret	32nd	2
2002	Freisinger Motorsport	Porsche 911 GT3-RS	N-GT	MAG	SIL; 5	BRN; 9	JAR; 5	AND; 10	OSC; 4	SPA; 6H ?	SPA; 12H ?	SPA; 24H; 3	PER	DON	EST; 6		15th	17
2003	Freisinger Motorsport	Porsche 911 GT3-RS	N-GT	CAT; Ret	MAG; 4	PER; Ret	BRN; 6	DON; 3	SPA; 6H; Ret	SPA; 12H; Ret	SPA; 24H; Ret	AND; 5	OSC; 8	EST; 12	MNZ; 10		12th	19
2004	JMB Racing	Ferrari 575 GTC	GT	MNZ; 7	VAL; 7	MAG; Ret	HOC; 9	BRN; 8	DON; 10	SPA; 6H; 8	SPA; 12H; 5	SPA; 24H; 4	IMO; 13	OSC; 8	DUB; 13	ZHU; 9	18th	13.5
2005	GLPK-Carsport	Chevrolet Corvette C5-R	GT1	MNZ; 10	MAG; 4	SIL; Ret	IMO; 1	BRN; 4	SPA; 6H; DSQ	SPA; 12H; DSQ	SPA; 24H; DSQ	OSC; 3	IST; 5	ZHU; 1	DUB; 3	BHR; 3	6th	52
2006	GLPK-Carsport	Chevrolet Corvette C6.R	GT1	SIL; 8	BRN; 8	OSC; Ret	SPA; 6H; 3	SPA; 12H; 3	SPA; 24H; 3	LEC; 1	DIJ; Ret	MUG; 7	HUN; 2	ADR; 3	DUB; 2		7th	48
2007	PK Carsport	Chevrolet Corvette C5-R	GT1	ZHU; 3	SIL; 3	BUC; 5	MNZ; 5	OSC; DSQ	SPA; 6H; 8	SPA; 12H; 5	SPA; 24H; 3	ADR; 10	BRN; 3	NOG; 8	ZOL; 2		7th	43.5
2008	PekaRacing nv	Saleen S7-R	GT1	SIL; 12	MNZ; 6	ADR; Ret	OSC; 10	SPA; 6H; 8	SPA; 12H; 7	SPA; 24H; Ret	BUC; 1; 6	BUC; 2; 4	BRN; Ret	NOG; Ret	ZOL; Ret	SAN; 1	11th	18.5
2009	Selleslagh Racing Team	Corvette C6.R	GT1	SIL; 6	ADR; 5	OSC; 4	SPA; 6H ?	SPA; 12H ?	SPA; 24H; 5	BUC; 6	ALG; 1	LEC; 3	ZOL; 6				3rd	38

=== Complete European Le Mans Series results ===
(key) (Races in bold indicate pole position; results in italics indicate fastest lap)

Year	Entrant	Class	Chassis	Engine	1	2	3	4	5	6	Rank	Points
2004	JMB Racing	GT	Porsche 911 GT3-RSR	Porsche 3.6 L Flat-6	MNZ	NUR	SIL	SPA; 5			22nd	4
2016	Race Performance	LMP3	Ligier JS P3	Nissan VK50VE 5.0 L V8	SIL; 6	IMO; 13	RBR; 6	LEC; Ret	SPA; Ret	EST; 7	13th	22.5

=== Complete GT1 World Championship results ===
(key) (Races in bold indicate pole position) (Races in italics indicate fastest lap)

Year	Team	Car	1	2	3	4	5	6	7	8	9	10	11	12	13	14	15	16	17	18	19	20	Pos	Points
2010	Triple H Team Hegersport	Maserati MC12 GT1	ABU; QR; DNS	ABU; CR; 7	SIL; QR; 16	SIL; CR; 4	BRN; QR; 10	BRN; CR; 11	LEC; QR; 14	LEC; CR; 11	SPA; QR; 4	SPA; CR; 8	NÜR; QR; Ret	NÜR; CR; 9	ALG; QR	ALG; CR	NAV; QR; 6	NAV; CR; Ret	INT; QR	INT; CR	SAN; QR	SAN; CR	28th	24

=== Complete GT World Challenge Europe results ===
==== GT World Challenge Europe Endurance Cup ====
(key) (Races in bold indicate pole position) (Races in italics indicate fastest lap)

Year	Team	Car	Class	1	2	3	4	5	6	7	8	Pos.	Points
2011	WRT Belgian Audi Club	Audi R8 LMS	GT3 Pro	MNZ; 2	NAV; 2	SPA; 6H ??	SPA; 12H ??	SPA; 24H; 4	MAG; 14	SIL; 2		3rd	74
2012	Marc VDS Racing Team	BMW Z4 GT3	Pro	MNZ; 11	SIL; Ret	LEC; 6	SPA; 6H ??	SPA; 12H ??	SPA; 24H; 15	NÜR; 8	NAV; 12	13th	31

=== Complete International GT Open results ===
Year	Team	Car	Class	1	2	3	4	5	6	7	8	9	10	11	12	13	14	15	16	Pos.	Points
2013	V8 Racing	Chevrolet Corvette C6.R	Super GT	LEC; 1; 7	LEC; 2; 5	ALG; 1	ALG; 2	NUR; 1; 2	NUR; 2; 15	JER; 1; 6	JER; 2; 5	SIL; 1; 3	SIL; 2; 3	SPA; 1; 9	SPA; 2 Ret	MNZ; 1 Ret	MNZ; 2; 8	CAT; 1 Ret	CAT; 2; 28	8th	56

=== NASCAR ===
(key) (Bold – Pole position awarded by qualifying time. Italics – Pole position earned by points standings or practice time. * – Most laps led.)

==== Whelen Euro Series - Elite 1 ====
NASCAR Whelen Euro Series - Elite 1 results
Year	Team	No.	Make	1	2	3	4	5	6	7	8	9	10	11	12	NWES	Pts
2014	PK Carsport	11	Chevy	**VAL**; 2	VAL; 3	BRH; 18	BRH; 21	TOU; 6	TOU; 9	NÜR; 12	NÜR; 8	UMB; 8	UMB; 7	BUG; 5	BUG; 7	6th	573
2015	PK Carsport	11	Chevy	VAL; 17	VAL; 22	VEN; 5	VEN; 15	BRH; 8	BRH; 6	TOU; 12	TOU; 12	UMB; 15	UMB; 4	ZOL; 15	ZOL; 17	12th	509
2016	PK Carsport	11	Chevy	VAL; 7	VAL; 9	VEN; DNS	VEN; 11	BRH; 10	BRH; 11	TOU; 10	TOU; 7	ADR; 3	ADR; 4	ZOL; 19	ZOL; 8	5th	535
2018	Alex Caffi Motorsport	1	Ford	VAL	VAL	FRA	FRA	BRH; 23	BRH; 27	TOU	TOU					38th	60
2018	PK Carsport	11	Chevy									HOC; 25	HOC; DNS	ZOL	ZOL	38th	60

==== Whelen Euro Series - Elite 2 ====
NASCAR Whelen Euro Series - Elite 1 results
Year	Team	No.	Make	1	2	3	4	5	6	7	8	9	10	11	12	13	NWES	Pts
2019	PK Carsport	11	Chevy	VAL; 20	VAL; 21	FRA; 9	FRA; 8	BRH	BRH	MOS	MOS	VEN	HOC	HOC	ZOL	ZOL	31st	90

=== Complete GT2 European Series results ===
(key) (Races in bold indicate pole position) (Races in italics indicate fastest lap)

Year	Team	Car	Class	1	2	3	4	5	6	7	8	9	10	11	12	Pos.	Points
2021	PK Carsport	Audi R8 LMS GT2	Pro-Am	MON; 1; 5	MON; 2; 1	**HOC**; **1**; 3	HOC; 2; 6	MIS; 1; 3	**MIS**; **2**; 1	**SPA**; **1**; 1	SPA; 2; 7	LEC; 1; 4	LEC; 2; 7			2nd	174
2022	PK Carsport	Audi R8 LMS GT2	Pro-Am	IMO; 1; 4	IMO; 2; 3	RBR; 1; 3	RBR; 2; 6	MIS; 1; 3	MIS; 2; 4	SPA; 1; 10	SPA; 2; 8	VAL; 1; 3	VAL; 2; 6	LEC; 1; 4	LEC; 2; 9†	3rd	143
