= 24 Hours of Zolder =

Sports car and touring car endurance race

- Venue: Circuit Zolder
- First race: 1977
- Duration: 24 Hours
- Most wins (driver): (Belgium) Bert Longin (7)
- Most wins (team): (Belgium) GLPK Carsport (8)
- Most wins (manufacturer): (Germany) Porsche (22)

The 24 Hours of Zolder (24 uur van Zolder in Dutch) is a yearly sports car and touring car endurance race held at Circuit Zolder in Belgium.

The race was initially held in 1977, and has run every year except for 1988. In 1989 a GT car won for the first time, and the following year the race joined the calendar of the BBL Cup, which became the Carglass Cup in 1992. The 24 Hours became part of the Belcar championship in 1997 (for a few years named Belgian GT Championship, since 2010 named Belcar Endurance Championship), continuing to be the series' yearly endurance event.

== List of winners ==
Year	Drivers	Team	Car
1977	(Belgium) Baudoin Corbiau (Belgium) Rudy Frahm (Belgium) Dirk Vermeersch		Autobianchi A112
1978	(Belgium) Philippe Hoebeke (Belgium) Hoebeke (Belgium) Van den Broeck		BMW 2002
1979	(Belgium) Philippe Hoebeke (Belgium) François-Xavier Boucher (Belgium) Roger Bertrand		BMW 2002
1980	(Belgium) Jos Reussens (Belgium) Luc Reussens (Belgium) Jos Stolck		BMW 3
1981	(Belgium) Jos Reussens (Belgium) Luc Reussens (Belgium) Dirk Vermeersch		BMW 3
1982	(Belgium) Dirk Van Rompuy (Belgium) Marc Flamand (Belgium) Paul Daerden		Opel Kadett
1983	(Belgium) Albert Vanierschot (Belgium) Raymond Raus		Renault 5 Turbo
1984	(Belgium) Noël van den Eeckhout (Belgium) Rik de Mey (Belgium) "Gustavson"		BMW 323i
1985	(Belgium) Noël van den Eeckhout (Belgium) Patrick Dewulf (Belgium) Bruno Clemens		BMW 320i
1986	(Belgium) Patrick Slaus (Belgium) Bernard Bormans (Belgium) Charles Geeraerts		BMW PSR
1987	(Belgium) Étienne Dumortier (Belgium) Jean-Marie Baert (Belgium) Alain Plash		Volvo 240 Turbo
1988	Not held		
1989	(Belgium) Philippe de Craene (Belgium) Roger van Peteghem (Belgium) Didier de Puyseleyr		Porsche 911 Carrera
1990	(Belgium) Étienne Dumortier (Belgium) Dominique Dumortier (Belgium) Baudoin de Rosee	(Belgium) JED2 Racing	Volvo 240 Turbo
1991	(Belgium) Marc Dries (Belgium) Jean Wiels (Belgium) Kurt Thiers	(Belgium) ERCO	BMW 325VR
1992	(Germany) Michael Beilke (Germany) Edgar Dören (Germany) Peter Prosten	(Germany) RSR Racing Team	Porsche 911 Carrera
1993	(Belgium) Kurt Dujardyn (Belgium) Eddy Maes (Belgium) Arnold Herreman		Porsche 911 Carrera RS
1994	(Belgium) Alfons Taels (Belgium) Vincent Dupont (Belgium) Kurt Thiers	(Belgium) GL Racing Team	Porsche 911 Carrera RS
1995	(Belgium) Albert Vanierschot (Belgium) Paul Kumpen (Belgium) Georges Cremer	(Belgium) GL Racing Team	Porsche 911 RSR
1996	(Belgium) Vincent Dupont (Belgium) Erik Bruynoghe (Belgium) Kurt Dujardyn	(Belgium) GL Racing Team	Porsche 911 RSR
1997	(Netherlands) Patrick Huisman (Belgium) Marc Goossens (Belgium) Vincent Vosse	(Belgium) Geert van de Venne	Porsche 911 RSR
1998	(Netherlands) Patrick Huisman (Belgium) Marc Goossens (Belgium) Thierry Boutsen	(Belgium) Geert van de Venne	Porsche 911 RSR
1999	(Belgium) Jean-François Hemroulle (Belgium) Tim Verbergt (France) Marcel Tarrès	(Belgium) VW-Audi Club	Audi A4
2000	(Belgium) Stéphane Cohen (Belgium) Anthony Kumpen (Belgium) Marc Duez	(Belgium) GLPK Racing	Chrysler Viper GTS-R
2001	(Belgium) Albert Vanierschot (Belgium) Freddy van Roey (Belgium) Tim Verbergt	(Belgium) AD Sport	Porsche 993 Bi-Turbo
2002	(Belgium) Anthony Kumpen (Netherlands) Mike Hezemans (Belgium) Bert Longin (Belgium) Vincent Dupont	(Belgium) GLPK Racing	Chrysler Viper GTS-R
2003	(Belgium) Anthony Kumpen (Netherlands) Mike Hezemans (Belgium) Bert Longin (Belgium) Vincent Dupont	(Belgium) GLPK Racing	Chrysler Viper GTS-R
2004	(Belgium) Anthony Kumpen (Netherlands) Mike Hezemans (Belgium) Bert Longin (Portugal) Pedro Lamy	(Belgium) GLPK Racing	Chrysler Viper GTS-R
2005	(Belgium) Marc Goossens (Netherlands) David Hart (Belgium) Guy Verheyen (Belgium) Jan Heylen	(Belgium) SRT	Chevrolet Corvette C5-R
2006	(Netherlands) David Hart (Belgium) Marc Duez (Belgium) Maxime Soulet (Belgium) Tom Cloet	(Belgium) SRT	Chevrolet Corvette C5-R
2007	(Belgium) Guillaume Dumarey (Belgium) Maxime Soulet (Belgium) Marc Goossens (Belgium) Maxime Dumarey	(Belgium) GPR Racing	Porsche 997 GT3 Cup
2008	(Belgium) Bart Couwberghs (Belgium) Ruben Maes (Belgium) Heinz Bonnaerens (Belgium) Ward Sluys	(Belgium) NGT Racing	Porsche 997 GT3 Cup S
2009	(Belgium) Rudi Penders (Belgium) Franz Lamot (Belgium) David Loix (Belgium) Louis Machiels	(Belgium) ProSpeed Competition	Porsche 996 GT3 RS
2010	(Belgium) Bert Longin (Belgium) Anthony Kumpen (Belgium) Frank Beliën (Netherlands) Henk Haane	(Belgium) First Motorsport	Porsche 997 GT3 Cup
2011	(Belgium) Bert Longin (Belgium) François Verbist (Belgium) Enzo Ide (Netherlands) Xavier Maassen	(Belgium) W Racing Team	Audi R8 LMS
2012	(Belgium) Laurens Vanthoor (Belgium) Anthony Kumpen (Italy) Marco Bonanomi (Sweden) Edward Sandström	(Belgium) W Racing Team	Audi R8 LMS Ultra
2013	(Belgium) Dylan Derdaele (Germany) Kenneth Heyer (Belgium) Bert Redant (Belgium) Frank Thiers (Poland) Kuba Giermaziak	Belgium Racing	Porsche 991 Cup
2014	(Belgium) Dylan Derdaele (Germany) Kenneth Heyer (Netherlands) Peter Hoevenaars (Belgium) Frank Thiers	Belgium Racing	Porsche 991 Cup
2015	(Belgium) Dylan Derdaele (Germany) Kenneth Heyer (Netherlands) Peter Hoevenaars (Belgium) Marc Goossens	Belgium Racing	Porsche 991 Cup
2016	(Belgium) Dylan Derdaele (Germany) Kenneth Heyer (Netherlands) Peter Hoevenaars (Belgium) Yannick Hoogaars (Belgium) Marc Goossens	Belgium Racing	Porsche 991 Cup
2017	(Belgium) Christoff Corten (Belgium) Jeffrey van Hooydonk (Belgium) Gilles Magnus (Belgium) Hans Thiers (Belgium) Frank Thiers	(Belgium) Scuderia Monza by DVB Racing	Norma M20-FC
2018	(Germany) Christian Engelhart (Belgium) Lieven Goegebuer (Belgium) Niels Lagrange (Belgium) Xavier Stevens (Belgium) Dries Vanthoor	(Belgium) Independent Motorsports	Porsche 991 Cup
2019	(Belgium) Christoff Corten (Belgium) Bert Longin (Belgium) Stienes Longin (Switzerland) Giorgio Maggi	(France) Krafft Racing	Norma M20-FC
2020	Not held		
2021	(Belgium) Jeffrey van Hooydonk (Belgium) Gilles Magnus (Belgium) Hans Thiers (Belgium) Frank Thiers (Israel) Alon Day	(Belgium) Russell Racing by PK	Norma M20-FC
2022	(Belgium) Bert Longin (Belgium) Stienes Longin (Belgium) Peter Guelinckx (Belgium) Nicolas Saelens (Belgium) Dries Vanthoor	(Belgium) PK Carsport	Audi R8 LMS GT2
2023	(Belgium) Glenn Van Parijs (Belgium) Nicolas Saelens (Belgium) Nico Verdonck (Belgium) Rodrigue Gillion (France) Thomas Laurent	(Belgium) August by NGT	Porsche 992 GT3 Cup
2024	(Belgium) Bertrand Baguette (Belgium) Benjamin Paque (Belgium) Kobe Pauwels (Belgium) Glenn Van Parijs (Sweden) Robin Knutsson	(Belgium) D'Ieteren Luxury Performance by NGT	Porsche 992 GT3 Cup
2025	(Belgium) Kobe De Breucker (Germany) Kenneth Heyer (Luxembourg) Dylan Pereira (Belgium) Ayrton Redant (Belgium) Yannick Redant	(Belgium) RedAnt Racing	Porsche 992 GT3 Cup
2026	(Belgium) Bertrand Baguette (United Kingdom) Jonny Edgar (Belgium) Laurens Vanthoor (Belgium) Glenn Van Parijs (Belgium) Tom Van Rompuy	(Belgium) NGT Racing	Porsche 992 GT3 Cup

== Statistics ==
=== By driver ===
Multiple wins per driver
Wins	Driver	Years
7	(Belgium) Bert Longin	2002, 2003, 2004, 2010, 2011, 2019, 2022
6	(Belgium) Marc Goossens	1997, 1998, 2005, 2007, 2015, 2016
6	(Belgium) Anthony Kumpen	2000, 2002, 2003, 2004, 2010, 2012
5	(Germany) Kenneth Heyer	2013, 2014, 2015, 2016, 2025
4	(Belgium) Vincent Dupont	1994, 1996, 2002, 2003
4	(Belgium) Dylan Derdaele	2013, 2014, 2015, 2016
4	(Belgium) Frank Thiers	2013, 2014, 2017, 2021
3	(Belgium) Albert Vanierschot	1983, 1995, 2001
3	(Netherlands) Mike Hezemans	2002, 2003, 2004
3	(Netherlands) Peter Hoevenaars	2014, 2015, 2016
3	(Belgium) Glenn Van Parijs	2023, 2024, 2026
2	(Belgium) Dirk Vermeersch	1977, 1981
2	(Belgium) Philippe Hoebeke	1978, 1979
2	(Belgium) Jos Reussens	1980, 1981
2	(Belgium) Luc Reussens	1980, 1981
2	(Belgium) Noel Van Den Eeckhout	1984, 1985
2	(Belgium) Etienne Dumortier	1987, 1990
2	(Belgium) Kurt Thiers	1991, 1994
2	(Belgium) Kurt Dujardyn	1993, 1996
2	(Netherlands) Patrick Huisman	1997, 1998
2	(Belgium) Tim Verbergt	1999, 2001
2	(Belgium) Marc Duez	2000, 2006
2	(Netherlands) David Hart	2005, 2006
2	(Belgium) Maxime Soulet	2006, 2007
2	(Belgium) Laurens Vanthoor	2012, 2026
2	(Belgium) Christoff Corten	2017, 2019
2	(Belgium) Gilles Magnus	2017, 2021
2	(Belgium) Hans Thiers	2017, 2021
2	(Belgium) Jeffrey van Hooydonk	2017, 2021
2	(Belgium) Dries Vanthoor	2018, 2022
2	(Belgium) Stienes Longin	2018, 2022
2	(Belgium) Nicolas Saelens	2022, 2023
2	(Belgium) Bertrand Baguette	2024, 2026

=== By manufacturer ===
Wins by manufacturer
Wins	Manufacturer	Years
22	(Germany) Porsche	1989, 1992, 1993, 1994, 1995, 1996, 1997, 1998, 2001, 2007, 2008, 2009, 2010, 2013, 2014, 2015, 2016, 2018, 2023, 2024, 2025, 2026
8	(Germany) BMW	1978, 1979, 1980, 1981, 1984, 1985, 1986, 1991
4	(Germany) Audi	1999, 2011, 2012, 2022
4	(United States) Chrysler	2000, 2002, 2003, 2004
3	(France) Norma	2017, 2019, 2021
2	(Sweden) Volvo	1987, 1990
2	(United States) Chevrolet	2005, 2006
1	(France) Autobianchi	1977
1	(Germany) Opel	1982
1	(France) Renault	1983

=== By Teams ===
Wins by teams
Wins	Team	Years
8	(Belgium) GLPK/PK Carsport	1994, 1995, 1996, 2000, 2002, 2003, 2004, 2022
4	(Belgium) NGT Racing	2008, 2023, 2024, 2026
4	Belgium Racing	2013, 2014, 2015, 2016
2	(Belgium) Geert van de Venne	1997, 1998
2	(Belgium) SRT	2005, 2006
2	(Belgium) W Racing Team	2011, 2012
2	(Belgium) Russell Racing/Scuderia Monza	2017, 2021
1	(Belgium) JED2 Racing	1990
1	(Belgium) ERCO	1991
1	(Germany) RSR Racing Team	1992
1	(Belgium) VW-Audi Club/Dubois Racing	1999
1	(Belgium) AD Sport	2001
1	(Belgium) GPR Racing	2007
1	(Belgium) Prospeed Competition	2009
1	(Belgium) First Motorsport	2010
1	(Belgium) Independent Motorsports	2018
1	(France) Krafft Racing	2019
1	(Belgium) RedAnt Racing	2025
