= 2009 24 Hours of Spa =

Motor racing meeting

2009 Total Spa 24 Hours

Seasons
- ← 2008 2010 →

Layout of the Circuit de Spa-Francorchamps

The 2009 Total 24 Hours of Spa was the 62nd running of the Spa 24 Hours and the fourth round of the 2009 FIA GT Championship season. The race took place at Circuit de Spa-Francorchamps between 25 and 26 July 2009. Joining the FIA GT Championship competitors were cars from numerous national GT series as well as competitors from the FIA GT3 European Championship. This was the last time GT1 machinery was eligible for the race, as well as the last Spa 24 Hours that was part of the FIA GT Championship.

PK Carsport's Anthony Kumpen, Mike Hezemans, Kurt Mollekens, and Jos Menten won the race for the second time for Corvette, leading a Vitaphone Racing Maserati and a Phoenix Racing Audi for the overall podium. The GT2 category was won by AF Corse Ferrari, while the Ford GT of Matech GT Racing won amongst G3 entries.

== Report ==
=== Qualifying ===
Qualifying's three sessions were hampered by rain, with the only dry track time coming in the early minutes of the first session. The three Vitaphone Maseratis were able to quickly grab the top positions before the rains came, locking them into that position as no improvements were able to be made in any of the latter wet sessions.

The No. 120 Rossa Corsa Ferrari and No. 11 Full Speed Racing Saleen were required to start from pit lane after they both changed engines following qualifying. The two PMB Motorsports Porsches did not participate in any of the three qualifying sessions and also had to start from pit lane.

==== Qualifying results ====
Pole position winners in each class are marked in bold.

| Pos | Class | Team | Lap Time | Grid |
|---|---|---|---|---|
| 1 | **GT1** | **No.2 Vitaphone Racing Team** | **2:18.030** | **1** |
| 2 | GT1 | No.33 Vitaphone Racing Team DHL | 2:18.591 | 2 |
| 3 | GT1 | No.1 Vitaphone Racing Team | 2:19.222 | 3 |
| 4 | GT1 | No.8 Sangari Team Brazil | 2:19.530 | 4 |
| 5 | GT1 | No.3 Selleslagh Racing Team | 2:19.670 | 5 |
| 6 | GT1 | No.40 Marc VDS Racing Team | 2:21.881 | 6 |
| 7 | GT1 | No.4 PK Carsport | 2:22.640 | 7 |
| 8 | GT1 | No.35 Nissan Motorsports | 2:24.109 | 8 |
| 9 | **GT2** | **No.50 AF Corse** | **2:25.232** | **9** |
| 10 | GT2 | No.55 CRS Racing | 2:26.349 | 10 |
| 11 | **G3** | **No.121 Matech GT Racing** | **2:26.364** | **11** |
| 12 | GT2 | No.59 Trackspeed Racing | 2:26.471 | 12 |
| 13 | GT2 | No.77 BMS Scuderia Italia | 2:26.584 | 13 |
| 14 | GT2 | No.51 AF Corse | 2:27.245 | 14 |
| 15 | GT2 | No.70 IMSA Performance Matmut | 2:28.038 | 15 |
| 16 | GT2 | No.60 Prospeed Competition | 2:28.133 | 16 |
| 17 | **G2** | **No.111 Phoenix Racing** | **2:28.327** | **17** |
| 18 | GT2 | No.97 Brixia Racing | 2:29.320 | 18 |
| 19 | G3 | No.172 Barwell Motorsports | 2:30.014 | 19 |
| 20 | G3 | No.145 First Motorsport | 2:30.458 | 20 |
| 21 | GT2 | No.56 CRS Racing | 2:30.593 | 21 |
| 22 | G3 | No.123 Mühlner Motorsport | 2:30.648 | 22 |
| 23 | G3 | No.174 M.P. Sport | 2:31.472 | 23 |
| 24 | G2 | No.118 Gravity Racing International | 2:31.601 | 24 |
| 25 | G3 | No.124 Mühlner Motorsport | 2:31.693 | 25 |
| 26 | G3 | No.122 Matech GT Racing | 2:31.796 | 26 |
| 27 | GT2 | No.99 JMB Racing | 2:32.294 | 27 |
| 28 | GT2 | No.61 Prospeed Competition | 2:36.050 | 28 |
| 29 | G2 | No.116 Jetalliance Racing | 2:39.943 | 29 |
| 30 | G3 | No.120 Rossa Corsa | 2:39.981 | Pit |
| 31 | G3 | No.160 Prospeed Competition | 2:41.463 | 30 |
| 32 | GT1 | No.11 Full Speed Racing Team | 2:41.902 | Pit |
| 33 | G2 | No.110 G&A Racing | 2:52.360 | 31 |
| 34 | G3 | No.161 Prospeed Competition | 2:55.564 | 32 |
| 35 | GT2 | No.78 BMS Scuderia Italia | 2:58.437 | 33 |
| 36 | GT2 | No.95 PeCom Racing | 2:59.646 | 35 |
| 37 | G3 | No.175 M.P. Garage | 3:00.933 | 34 |
| – | G2 | No.117 PMB Motorsport | No Time | Pit |
| – | G2 | No.115 PMB Motorsport | No Time | Pit |

=== Race ===
Victory in the race went to the number 4 PK Carsport Chevrolet Corvette C6.R GT1, which finished 11 laps ahead of the second placed Maserati MC12 GT1 of Vitaphone Racing Team DHL. Phoenix Racing, AF Corse and Matech GT Racing took class victories.

Following the race, Porsche revealed that all of their cars participating in the GT2 category had used steel sleeves which did not match the homologation papers for the 997 GT3-RSR. The FIA later disqualified all Porsches from the GT2 category for this violation, amending the final race results.

==== Race result ====
Class winners in bold. Cars failing to complete 75% of winner's distance marked as Not Classified (NC).

| Pos | Class | No | Team | Drivers | Chassis | Tyre | Laps |
| Pos | Class | No | Team | Drivers | Engine | Tyre | Laps |
|---|---|---|---|---|---|---|---|
| 1 | **GT1** | **4** | **(Belgium) PK Carsport** | **(Belgium) Anthony Kumpen (Belgium) Kurt Mollekens (Netherlands) Mike Hezemans (Netherlands) Jos Menten** | **Chevrolet Corvette C6.R** | M | **559** |
| 1 | **GT1** | **4** | **(Belgium) PK Carsport** | **(Belgium) Anthony Kumpen (Belgium) Kurt Mollekens (Netherlands) Mike Hezemans (Netherlands) Jos Menten** | **Chevrolet LS7.R 7.0 L V8** | M | **559** |
| 2 | GT1 | 33 | (Germany) Vitaphone Racing Team DHL | (Belgium) Vincent Vosse (Belgium) Stéphane Lémeret (Italy) Alessandro Pier Guidi (Sweden) Carl Rosenblad | Maserati MC12 GT1 | M | 548 |
| 2 | GT1 | 33 | (Germany) Vitaphone Racing Team DHL | (Belgium) Vincent Vosse (Belgium) Stéphane Lémeret (Italy) Alessandro Pier Guidi (Sweden) Carl Rosenblad | Maserati 6.0 L V12 | M | 548 |
| 3 | **G2** | **111** | **(Germany) Phoenix Racing** | **(Switzerland) Marcel Fässler (Switzerland) Henri Moser (Greece) Alexandros Margaritis (Germany) Marc Basseng** | **Audi R8 LMS** | M | **544** |
| 3 | **G2** | **111** | **(Germany) Phoenix Racing** | **(Switzerland) Marcel Fässler (Switzerland) Henri Moser (Greece) Alexandros Margaritis (Germany) Marc Basseng** | **Audi 5.2 L V10** | M | **544** |
| 4 | **GT2** | **50** | **(Italy) AF Corse** | **(Italy) Gianmaria Bruni (Finland) Toni Vilander (Brazil) Jaime Melo (Argentina) Luís Pérez Companc** | **Ferrari F430 GT2** | M | **540** |
| 4 | **GT2** | **50** | **(Italy) AF Corse** | **(Italy) Gianmaria Bruni (Finland) Toni Vilander (Brazil) Jaime Melo (Argentina) Luís Pérez Companc** | **Ferrari 4.0 L V8** | M | **540** |
| 5 | GT2 | 56 | (United Kingdom) CRS Racing | (United Kingdom) Rob Bell (United Kingdom) Andrew Kirkaldy (Spain) Antonio García (Netherlands) Peter Kox | Ferrari F430 GT2 | M | 528 |
| 5 | GT2 | 56 | (United Kingdom) CRS Racing | (United Kingdom) Rob Bell (United Kingdom) Andrew Kirkaldy (Spain) Antonio García (Netherlands) Peter Kox | Ferrari 4.0 L V8 | M | 528 |
| 6 | GT2 | 55 | (United Kingdom) CRS Racing | (Canada) Chris Niarchos (United Kingdom) Tim Mullen (United Kingdom) Phil Quaife (United Kingdom) Chris Goodwin | Ferrari F430 GT2 | M | 525 |
| 6 | GT2 | 55 | (United Kingdom) CRS Racing | (Canada) Chris Niarchos (United Kingdom) Tim Mullen (United Kingdom) Phil Quaife (United Kingdom) Chris Goodwin | Ferrari 4.0 L V8 | M | 525 |
| 7 | **G3** | **121** | **(Switzerland) Matech GT Racing** | **(Germany) Thomas Mutsch (Germany) Marc Hennerici (Belgium) Maxime Martin (Switzerland) Peter Wyss** | **Ford GT GT3** | M | **519** |
| 7 | **G3** | **121** | **(Switzerland) Matech GT Racing** | **(Germany) Thomas Mutsch (Germany) Marc Hennerici (Belgium) Maxime Martin (Switzerland) Peter Wyss** | **Ford 5.0 L Supercharged V8** | M | **519** |
| 8 | G3 | 123 | (Belgium) Mühlner Motorsport | (Belgium) Christian Lefort (Belgium) François Verbist (Australia) Rodney Forbes | Porsche 997 GT3 Cup S | M | 518 |
| 8 | G3 | 123 | (Belgium) Mühlner Motorsport | (Belgium) Christian Lefort (Belgium) François Verbist (Australia) Rodney Forbes | Porsche 3.6 L Flat-6 | M | 518 |
| 9 | G3 | 161 | (Belgium) Prospeed Competition | (Finland) Markus Palttala (Austria) Niki Lanik (Belgium) David Loix (Netherlands) Oskar Slingerland | Porsche 997 GT3 Cup S | M | 517 |
| 9 | G3 | 161 | (Belgium) Prospeed Competition | (Finland) Markus Palttala (Austria) Niki Lanik (Belgium) David Loix (Netherlands) Oskar Slingerland | Porsche 3.6 L Flat-6 | M | 517 |
| 10 | GT1 | 35 | (Japan) Nissan Motorsports (United Kingdom) Gigawave Motorsport | (United Kingdom) Darren Turner (United Kingdom) Anthony Davidson (Germany) Michael Krumm | Nissan GT-R GT1 | M | 513 |
| 10 | GT1 | 35 | (Japan) Nissan Motorsports (United Kingdom) Gigawave Motorsport | (United Kingdom) Darren Turner (United Kingdom) Anthony Davidson (Germany) Michael Krumm | Nissan 5.6 L V8 | M | 513 |
| 11 | G3 | 172 | (United Kingdom) Barwell Motorsport | (Belgium) Eddy Renard (Belgium) Koen Wauters (Belgium) Jeffrey van Hooydonk (Belgium) Julien Schroyen | Aston Martin DBRS9 | M | 503 |
| 11 | G3 | 172 | (United Kingdom) Barwell Motorsport | (Belgium) Eddy Renard (Belgium) Koen Wauters (Belgium) Jeffrey van Hooydonk (Belgium) Julien Schroyen | Aston Martin 6.0 L V12 | M | 503 |
| 12 | G3 | 145 | (Belgium) First Motorsport | (Belgium) Christian Kelders (Belgium) Philippe Greisch (France) Éric Hélary (France) Daniel Desbrueres | Porsche 997 GT3 Cup S | M | 497 |
| 12 | G3 | 145 | (Belgium) First Motorsport | (Belgium) Christian Kelders (Belgium) Philippe Greisch (France) Éric Hélary (France) Daniel Desbrueres | Porsche 3.6 L Flat-6 | M | 497 |
| 13 | GT1 | 1 | (Germany) Vitaphone Racing Team | (Germany) Michael Bartels (Italy) Andrea Bertolini (France) Stéphane Sarrazin (Brazil) Alexandre Negrão | Maserati MC12 GT1 | M | 489 |
| 13 | GT1 | 1 | (Germany) Vitaphone Racing Team | (Germany) Michael Bartels (Italy) Andrea Bertolini (France) Stéphane Sarrazin (Brazil) Alexandre Negrão | Maserati 6.0 L V12 | M | 489 |
| 14 | G2 | 116 | (Austria) Jetalliance Racing | (Austria) Lukas Lichtner-Hoyer (Austria) Vitus Eckert (United Kingdom) Martin Rich (United Kingdom) Ryan Sharp | Porsche 997 GT3 Cup | M | 487 |
| 14 | G2 | 116 | (Austria) Jetalliance Racing | (Austria) Lukas Lichtner-Hoyer (Austria) Vitus Eckert (United Kingdom) Martin Rich (United Kingdom) Ryan Sharp | Porsche 3.6 L Flat-6 | M | 487 |
| 15 | GT1 | 3 | (Belgium) Selleslagh Racing Team | (Belgium) Bert Longin (Belgium) Maxime Soulet (France) James Ruffier (United Kingdom) Oliver Gavin | Chevrolet Corvette C6.R | M | 485 |
| 15 | GT1 | 3 | (Belgium) Selleslagh Racing Team | (Belgium) Bert Longin (Belgium) Maxime Soulet (France) James Ruffier (United Kingdom) Oliver Gavin | Chevrolet LS7.R 7.0 L V8 | M | 485 |
| 16 | G3 | 160 | (Belgium) Prospeed Competition | (Belgium) Christophe Kerhove (France) Rémy Brouard (France) Eric Havette (France) Philippe Nozière | Porsche 997 GT3 Cup S | M | 484 |
| 16 | G3 | 160 | (Belgium) Prospeed Competition | (Belgium) Christophe Kerhove (France) Rémy Brouard (France) Eric Havette (France) Philippe Nozière | Porsche 3.6 L Flat-6 | M | 484 |
| 17 | G3 | 120 | (Republic of Ireland) Rosso Corsa | (Republic of Ireland) Michael Cullen (Republic of Ireland) Paddy Shovlin (United States) Mark Patterson (United States) Peter Ludwig | Ferrari F430 GT3 | P | 476 |
| 17 | G3 | 120 | (Republic of Ireland) Rosso Corsa | (Republic of Ireland) Michael Cullen (Republic of Ireland) Paddy Shovlin (United States) Mark Patterson (United States) Peter Ludwig | Ferrari 4.3 L V8 | P | 476 |
| 18 DNF | GT1 | 2 | (Germany) Vitaphone Racing Team | (Portugal) Miguel Ramos (Portugal) Pedro Lamy (Germany) Alex Müller (Belgium) Eric van de Poele | Maserati MC12 GT1 | M | 419 |
| 18 DNF | GT1 | 2 | (Germany) Vitaphone Racing Team | (Portugal) Miguel Ramos (Portugal) Pedro Lamy (Germany) Alex Müller (Belgium) Eric van de Poele | Maserati 6.0 L V12 | M | 419 |
| 19 DNF | GT2 | 99 | (Monaco) JMB Racing | (Switzerland) Maurizio Basso (Netherlands) Peter Kutemann (United Kingdom) John Hartshorne (France) Stéphane Daoudi | Ferrari F430 GT2 | M | 406 |
| 19 DNF | GT2 | 99 | (Monaco) JMB Racing | (Switzerland) Maurizio Basso (Netherlands) Peter Kutemann (United Kingdom) John Hartshorne (France) Stéphane Daoudi | Ferrari 4.0 L V8 | M | 406 |
| 20 NC | G2 | 110 | (Belgium) G&A Racing | (Belgium) Guino Kenis (Belgium) Michael De Keersmaecker (Belgium) Patrick Smets (Belgium) Joël Schuybroeck | Mosler MT900R GT3 | P | 403 |
| 20 NC | G2 | 110 | (Belgium) G&A Racing | (Belgium) Guino Kenis (Belgium) Michael De Keersmaecker (Belgium) Patrick Smets (Belgium) Joël Schuybroeck | Chevrolet LS7 7.0 L V8 | P | 403 |
| 21 DNF | GT2 | 77 | (Italy) BMS Scuderia Italia | (Italy) Paolo Ruberti (Italy) Matteo Malucelli (Italy) Diego Romanini (Germany) Kenneth Heyer | Ferrari F430 GT2 | P | 329 |
| 21 DNF | GT2 | 77 | (Italy) BMS Scuderia Italia | (Italy) Paolo Ruberti (Italy) Matteo Malucelli (Italy) Diego Romanini (Germany) Kenneth Heyer | Ferrari 4.0 L V8 | P | 329 |
| 22 NC | GT1 | 40 | (Belgium) Marc VDS Racing Team | (Belgium) Renaud Kuppens (Belgium) Bas Leinders (Belgium) Eric De Doncker | Ford GT1 | M | 318 |
| 22 NC | GT1 | 40 | (Belgium) Marc VDS Racing Team | (Belgium) Renaud Kuppens (Belgium) Bas Leinders (Belgium) Eric De Doncker | Ford 5.0 L V8 | M | 318 |
| 23 DNF | GT2 | 51 | (Italy) AF Corse | (Spain) Álvaro Barba (Italy) Niki Cadei (Argentina) Matías Russo (Germany) Pierre Kaffer | Ferrari F430 GT2 | M | 316 |
| 23 DNF | GT2 | 51 | (Italy) AF Corse | (Spain) Álvaro Barba (Italy) Niki Cadei (Argentina) Matías Russo (Germany) Pierre Kaffer | Ferrari 4.0 L V8 | M | 316 |
| 24 DNF | G3 | 174 | (France) M.P. Racing (France) Sport Garage | (France) Romain Brandela (France) Gaël Lesoudier (France) Thierry Prignaud (France) André Alain Corbel | BMW Alpina B6 GT3 | M | 288 |
| 24 DNF | G3 | 174 | (France) M.P. Racing (France) Sport Garage | (France) Romain Brandela (France) Gaël Lesoudier (France) Thierry Prignaud (France) André Alain Corbel | BMW 4.4 L Supercharged V8 | M | 288 |
| 25 DNF | G3 | 122 | (Switzerland) Matech GT Racing | (Brazil) Alexandre Funari Negrão (Brazil) Constantino de Oliveira Jr. (Brazil) Luiz Clemente Lunardi (Brazil) Andreas Mattheis | Ford GT GT3 | M | 272 |
| 25 DNF | G3 | 122 | (Switzerland) Matech GT Racing | (Brazil) Alexandre Funari Negrão (Brazil) Constantino de Oliveira Jr. (Brazil) Luiz Clemente Lunardi (Brazil) Andreas Mattheis | Ford 5.0 L Supercharged V8 | M | 272 |
| 26 DNF | G3 | 124 | (Belgium) Mühlner Motorsport | (Germany) Jürgen Häring (Germany) Achim Dürr (Germany) René Bourdeaux (Greece) Dimitrios Konstantinou | Porsche 997 GT3 Cup S | M | 234 |
| 26 DNF | G3 | 124 | (Belgium) Mühlner Motorsport | (Germany) Jürgen Häring (Germany) Achim Dürr (Germany) René Bourdeaux (Greece) Dimitrios Konstantinou | Porsche 3.6 L Flat-6 | M | 234 |
| 27 DNF | G2 | 117 | (Belgium) PMB Motorsport | (Germany) Wolfgang Kaufmann (France) Philippe Ullman (France) Gilles Vannelet (Switzerland) Jonathan Hirschi | Porsche 996 GT2-R | P | 159 |
| 27 DNF | G2 | 117 | (Belgium) PMB Motorsport | (Germany) Wolfgang Kaufmann (France) Philippe Ullman (France) Gilles Vannelet (Switzerland) Jonathan Hirschi | Porsche 3.6 L Turbo Flat-6 | P | 159 |
| 28 DNF | GT1 | 11 | (Austria) Full Speed Racing Team | (Belgium) Robert Dierick (Belgium) Carlo van Dam (Netherlands) Arjan van der Zwaan (Netherlands) Rob van der Zwaan | Saleen S7-R | P | 128 |
| 28 DNF | GT1 | 11 | (Austria) Full Speed Racing Team | (Belgium) Robert Dierick (Belgium) Carlo van Dam (Netherlands) Arjan van der Zwaan (Netherlands) Rob van der Zwaan | Ford 7.0 L V8 | P | 128 |
| 29 DNF | G2 | 118 | (Belgium) Gravity Racing International | (Canada) Jacques Villeneuve (Belgium) Vincent Radermecker (Belgium) Loris de Sordi (China) Ho-Pin Tung | Mosler MT900R GT3 | M | 65 |
| 29 DNF | G2 | 118 | (Belgium) Gravity Racing International | (Canada) Jacques Villeneuve (Belgium) Vincent Radermecker (Belgium) Loris de Sordi (China) Ho-Pin Tung | Chevrolet LS7 7.0 L V8 | M | 65 |
| 30 DNF | GT1 | 8 | Sangari Team Brazil | (Brazil) Enrique Bernoldi (Brazil) Roberto Streit (Netherlands) Xavier Maassen | Chevrolet Corvette C6.R | M | 55 |
| 30 DNF | GT1 | 8 | Sangari Team Brazil | (Brazil) Enrique Bernoldi (Brazil) Roberto Streit (Netherlands) Xavier Maassen | Chevrolet LS7.R 7.0 L V8 | M | 55 |
| 31 DNF | G2 | 115 | (Belgium) PMB Motorsport | (France) Gérard Tremblay (France) Dominique Nury (France) Christophe Lapierre (France) Jean-Charles Perrin | Porsche 996 GT2-R | P | 26 |
| 31 DNF | G2 | 115 | (Belgium) PMB Motorsport | (France) Gérard Tremblay (France) Dominique Nury (France) Christophe Lapierre (France) Jean-Charles Perrin | Porsche 3.6 L Turbo Flat-6 | P | 26 |
| 32 DNF | G3 | 175 | (France) M.P. Racing (France) Sport Garage | (France) Michaël Petit (France) Ange Barde (France) Pascal Hugot (Germany) Valentin Hummel | BMW Alpina B6 GT3 | M | 3 |
| 32 DNF | G3 | 175 | (France) M.P. Racing (France) Sport Garage | (France) Michaël Petit (France) Ange Barde (France) Pascal Hugot (Germany) Valentin Hummel | BMW 4.4 L Supercharged V8 | M | 3 |
| 33 DNF | GT2 | 78 | (Italy) BMS Scuderia Italia | (Italy) Fabio Babini (Italy) Christian Pescatori (Italy) Marcello Zani | Ferrari F430 GT2 | P | 3 |
| 33 DNF | GT2 | 78 | (Italy) BMS Scuderia Italia | (Italy) Fabio Babini (Italy) Christian Pescatori (Italy) Marcello Zani | Ferrari 4.0 L V8 | P | 3 |
| 34 DNF | GT2 | 95 | (Argentina) PeCom Racing Team (Italy) AF Corse | (Italy) Lorenzo Casè (Monaco) Cédric Sbirrazzuoli | Ferrari F430 GT2 | M | 3 |
| 34 DNF | GT2 | 95 | (Argentina) PeCom Racing Team (Italy) AF Corse | (Italy) Lorenzo Casè (Monaco) Cédric Sbirrazzuoli | Ferrari 4.0 L V8 | M | 3 |
| DSQ | GT2 | 97 | (Italy) Brixia Racing | (Italy) Luigi Lucchini (Austria) Martin Ragginger (Germany) Marco Holzer (United States) Bryce Miller | Porsche 997 GT3-RSR | M | 535 |
| DSQ | GT2 | 97 | (Italy) Brixia Racing | (Italy) Luigi Lucchini (Austria) Martin Ragginger (Germany) Marco Holzer (United States) Bryce Miller | Porsche 4.0 L Flat-6 | M | 535 |
| DSQ | GT2 | 61 | (Belgium) Prospeed Competition | (Netherlands) Paul van Splunteren (Netherlands) Raymond Coronel (Netherlands) Niek Hommerson (Belgium) Louis Machiels | Porsche 997 GT3-RSR | M | 527 |
| DSQ | GT2 | 61 | (Belgium) Prospeed Competition | (Netherlands) Paul van Splunteren (Netherlands) Raymond Coronel (Netherlands) Niek Hommerson (Belgium) Louis Machiels | Porsche 4.0 L Flat-6 | M | 527 |
| DSQ | GT2 | 60 | (Belgium) Prospeed Competition | (France) Emmanuel Collard (United Kingdom) Richard Westbrook (United Kingdom) Sean Edwards (Hong Kong) Darryl O'Young | Porsche 997 GT3-RSR | M | 526 |
| DSQ | GT2 | 60 | (Belgium) Prospeed Competition | (France) Emmanuel Collard (United Kingdom) Richard Westbrook (United Kingdom) Sean Edwards (Hong Kong) Darryl O'Young | Porsche 4.0 L Flat-6 | M | 526 |
| DSQ | GT2 | 59 | (United Kingdom) Trackspeed Racing | (United Kingdom) Tim Sugden (United Kingdom) David Ashburn (Monaco) Stéphane Ortelli (Germany) Jörg Bergmeister | Porsche 997 GT3-RSR | M | 486 |
| DSQ | GT2 | 59 | (United Kingdom) Trackspeed Racing | (United Kingdom) Tim Sugden (United Kingdom) David Ashburn (Monaco) Stéphane Ortelli (Germany) Jörg Bergmeister | Porsche 4.0 L Flat-6 | M | 486 |
| DSQ | GT2 | 70 | (France) IMSA Performance Matmut | (France) Raymond Narac (France) Patrick Pilet (United States) Patrick Long | Porsche 997 GT3-RSR | M | 425 |
| DSQ | GT2 | 70 | (France) IMSA Performance Matmut | (France) Raymond Narac (France) Patrick Pilet (United States) Patrick Long | Porsche 4.0 L Flat-6 | M | 425 |

FIA GT Championship
| Previous race: FIA GT Oschersleben 2 Hours | 2009 season | Next race: Budapest City Challenge |
