= 2008 24 Hours of Spa =

Auto race

2008 Total Spa 24 Hours

Seasons
- ← 2007 2009 →

Layout of the Circuit de Spa-Francorchamps

The 2008 Total 24 Hours of Spa was the 2008 FIA GT Championship season Is the final race before the summer break It took place at Circuit de Spa-Francorchamps, Belgium, on 2 – 3 August 2008.

== Half-point Leaders ==
In the FIA GT Championship (using the GT1 and GT2 classes), the top eight teams at the six-hour mark as well as the midway point of the race are awarded points towards the championship. Points for the top eight go in the order of 5 – 4 – 3 – 2.5 – 2 – 1.5 – 1 – 0.5.

=== 6 Hour Leaders in GT1 ===
Pos	No	Team	Laps
1	1	(Germany) Vitaphone Racing Team	147
2	2	(Germany) Vitaphone Racing Team	147
3	10	(United Kingdom) Gigawave Motorsport	147
4	6	(Germany) Phoenix Carsport Racing	147
5	33	(Austria) Jetalliance Racing	146
6	8	(Russia) IPB Spartak Racing	145
7	15	(Monaco) JMB Racing	142
8	4	(Belgium) Peka Racing	142

=== 6 Hour Leaders in GT2 ===
Pos	No	Team	Laps
1	77	(Italy) BMS Scuderia Italia	141
2	50	(Italy) AF Corse	141
3	61	(Belgium) Prospeed Competition	140
4	76	(France) IMSA Performance Matmut	140
5	56	(United Kingdom) CR Scuderia Racing	140
6	60	(Belgium) Prospeed Competition	140
7	51	(Italy) AF Corse	140
8	62	(United Kingdom) Scuderia Ecosse	140

=== 12 Hour Leaders in GT1 ===
Pos	No	Team	Laps
1	1	(Germany) Vitaphone Racing Team	283
2	2	(Germany) Vitaphone Racing Team	282
3	10	(United Kingdom) Gigawave Motorsport	280
4	8	(Russia) IPB Spartak Racing	278
5	6	(Germany) Phoenix Carsport Racing	277
6	15	(Monaco) JMB Racing	273
7	4	(Belgium) Peka Racing	255
8	None Running		

=== 12 Hour Leaders in GT2 ===
Pos	No	Team	Laps
1	77	(Italy) BMS Scuderia Italia	272
2	61	(Belgium) Prospeed Competition	271
3	50	(Italy) AF Corse	269
4	55	(United Kingdom) CR Scuderia Racing	266
5	57	(Switzerland) Kessel Racing	264
6	62	(United Kingdom) Scuderia Ecosse	259
7	59	(United Kingdom) Trackspeed Racing	258
8	75	(Australia) Juniper Racing	257

== Race results ==
Class winners in bold. Cars failing to complete 75% of winner's distance marked as Not Classified (NC).

Pos	Class	No	Team	Drivers	Chassis	Tyre	Laps
Pos	Class	No	Team	Drivers	Engine	Tyre	Laps
1	**GT1**	**1**	**(Germany) Vitaphone Racing Team**	**(Germany) Michael Bartels (Italy) Andrea Bertolini (Belgium) Eric van de Poele (France) Stéphane Sarrazin**	**Maserati MC12 GT1**	M	**577**
1	**GT1**	**1**	**(Germany) Vitaphone Racing Team**	**(Germany) Michael Bartels (Italy) Andrea Bertolini (Belgium) Eric van de Poele (France) Stéphane Sarrazin**	**Maserati 6.0 L V12**	M	**577**
2	GT1	2	(Germany) Vitaphone Racing Team	(Portugal) Miguel Ramos (Brazil) Alexandre Negrão (Belgium) Stéphane Lémeret (Italy) Alessandro Pier Guidi	Maserati MC12 GT1	M	575
2	GT1	2	(Germany) Vitaphone Racing Team	(Portugal) Miguel Ramos (Brazil) Alexandre Negrão (Belgium) Stéphane Lémeret (Italy) Alessandro Pier Guidi	Maserati 6.0 L V12	M	575
3	GT1	10	(United Kingdom) Gigawave Motorsport	(Austria) Philipp Peter (Denmark) Allan Simonsen (United Kingdom) Darren Turner (United Kingdom) Andrew Thompson	Aston Martin DBR9	M	570
3	GT1	10	(United Kingdom) Gigawave Motorsport	(Austria) Philipp Peter (Denmark) Allan Simonsen (United Kingdom) Darren Turner (United Kingdom) Andrew Thompson	Aston Martin 6.0 L V12	M	570
4	GT1	15	(Monaco) JMB Racing (United Kingdom) Aucott Racing	(United Kingdom) Ben Aucott (France) Alain Ferté (France) Stéphane Daoudi	Maserati MC12 GT1	M	561
4	GT1	15	(Monaco) JMB Racing (United Kingdom) Aucott Racing	(United Kingdom) Ben Aucott (France) Alain Ferté (France) Stéphane Daoudi	Maserati 6.0 L V12	M	561
5	**GT2**	**77**	**(Italy) BMS Scuderia Italia**	**(Switzerland) Joël Camathias (Italy) Davide Rigon (Italy) Paolo Ruberti (Italy) Matteo Malucelli**	**Ferrari F430 GT2**	P	**555**
5	**GT2**	**77**	**(Italy) BMS Scuderia Italia**	**(Switzerland) Joël Camathias (Italy) Davide Rigon (Italy) Paolo Ruberti (Italy) Matteo Malucelli**	**Ferrari 4.0 L V8**	P	**555**
6	GT2	61	(Belgium) Prospeed Competition	(France) Emmanuel Collard (United Kingdom) Richard Westbrook (Germany) Marc Lieb	Porsche 997 GT3-RSR	M	552
6	GT2	61	(Belgium) Prospeed Competition	(France) Emmanuel Collard (United Kingdom) Richard Westbrook (Germany) Marc Lieb	Porsche 4.0 L Flat-6	M	552
7	GT2	50	(Italy) AF Corse	(Italy) Gianmaria Bruni (Finland) Toni Vilander (Finland) Mika Salo (Brazil) Jaime Melo	Ferrari F430 GT2	M	550
7	GT2	50	(Italy) AF Corse	(Italy) Gianmaria Bruni (Finland) Toni Vilander (Finland) Mika Salo (Brazil) Jaime Melo	Ferrari 4.0 L V8	M	550
8	GT1	8	(Russia) IPB Spartak Racing (Germany) Reiter Engineering	(Netherlands) Jan Lammers (Netherlands) Peter Kox (Russia) Roman Rusinov (Czech Republic) Tomáš Enge	Lamborghini Murciélago R-GT	M	544
8	GT1	8	(Russia) IPB Spartak Racing (Germany) Reiter Engineering	(Netherlands) Jan Lammers (Netherlands) Peter Kox (Russia) Roman Rusinov (Czech Republic) Tomáš Enge	Lamborghini 6.0 L V12	M	544
9	GT2	55	(United Kingdom) CR Scuderia Racing	(Canada) Chris Niarchos (United Kingdom) Tim Mullen (United Kingdom) Gordon Shedden (Italy) Andrea Piccini	Ferrari F430 GT2	M	543
9	GT2	55	(United Kingdom) CR Scuderia Racing	(Canada) Chris Niarchos (United Kingdom) Tim Mullen (United Kingdom) Gordon Shedden (Italy) Andrea Piccini	Ferrari 4.0 L V8	M	543
10	GT2	57	(Switzerland) Kessel Racing	(Switzerland) Henri Moser (Italy) Fabrizio del Monte (Italy) Andrea Palma (France) Gilles Vannelet	Ferrari F430 GT2	M	541
10	GT2	57	(Switzerland) Kessel Racing	(Switzerland) Henri Moser (Italy) Fabrizio del Monte (Italy) Andrea Palma (France) Gilles Vannelet	Ferrari 4.0 L V8	M	541
11	GT2	56	(United Kingdom) CR Scuderia Racing	(United Kingdom) Andrew Kirkaldy (United Kingdom) Rob Bell (United Kingdom) James Sutton (Germany) Dirk Müller	Ferrari F430 GT2	M	536
11	GT2	56	(United Kingdom) CR Scuderia Racing	(United Kingdom) Andrew Kirkaldy (United Kingdom) Rob Bell (United Kingdom) James Sutton (Germany) Dirk Müller	Ferrari 4.0 L V8	M	536
12	GT2	76	(France) IMSA Performance Matmut	(France) Raymond Narac (Austria) Richard Lietz (United States) Patrick Long	Porsche 997 GT3-RSR	M	520
12	GT2	76	(France) IMSA Performance Matmut	(France) Raymond Narac (Austria) Richard Lietz (United States) Patrick Long	Porsche 4.0 L Flat-6	M	520
13	**G3**	**123**	**(Belgium) Mühlner Motorsport**	**(Germany) Heinz-Josef Bermes (Germany) Marc Basseng (Canada) Mark Thomas (Belgium) Jean-François Hemroulle**	**Porsche 997 GT3 Cup S**	M	**518**
13	**G3**	**123**	**(Belgium) Mühlner Motorsport**	**(Germany) Heinz-Josef Bermes (Germany) Marc Basseng (Canada) Mark Thomas (Belgium) Jean-François Hemroulle**	**Porsche 3.6 L Flat-6**	M	**518**
14	G3	124	(Belgium) Mühlner Motorsport	(Netherlands) Duncan Huisman (Netherlands) Paul van Splunteren (Netherlands) Roeland Voerman (United Kingdom) Ian Khan	Porsche 997 GT3 Cup S	M	513
14	G3	124	(Belgium) Mühlner Motorsport	(Netherlands) Duncan Huisman (Netherlands) Paul van Splunteren (Netherlands) Roeland Voerman (United Kingdom) Ian Khan	Porsche 3.6 L Flat-6	M	513
15	G3	112	(France) AS Events	(France) Christopher Campbell (France) François Jakubowski (France) Mathieu Zangarelli (France) Ange Barde	Ferrari F430 GT3	M	506
15	G3	112	(France) AS Events	(France) Christopher Campbell (France) François Jakubowski (France) Mathieu Zangarelli (France) Ange Barde	Ferrari 4.3 L V8	M	506
16	G3	160	(Belgium) Prospeed Competition	(Belgium) David Loix (Belgium) David Dermont (Belgium) Franz Lamot (Belgium) Jan Heylen	Porsche 997 GT3 Cup S	M	505
16	G3	160	(Belgium) Prospeed Competition	(Belgium) David Loix (Belgium) David Dermont (Belgium) Franz Lamot (Belgium) Jan Heylen	Porsche 3.6 L Flat-6	M	505
17	GT2	62	(United Kingdom) Scuderia Ecosse	(United Kingdom) Jamie Davies (Italy) Fabio Babini (Italy) Ferdinando Monfardini	Ferrari F430 GT2	P	503
17	GT2	62	(United Kingdom) Scuderia Ecosse	(United Kingdom) Jamie Davies (Italy) Fabio Babini (Italy) Ferdinando Monfardini	Ferrari 4.0 L V8	P	503
18	G3	145	(Belgium) First Motorsport	(Belgium) Christian Kelders (Belgium) Philippe Greisch (Belgium) Christophe Kirkhove (Belgium) François Duval	Porsche 997 GT3 Cup S	M	501
18	G3	145	(Belgium) First Motorsport	(Belgium) Christian Kelders (Belgium) Philippe Greisch (Belgium) Christophe Kirkhove (Belgium) François Duval	Porsche 3.6 L Flat-6	M	501
19	GT2	75	(Australia) Juniper Racing	(Australia) Shaun Juniper (Australia) Max Twigg (New Zealand) Craig Baird (Australia) Rodney Forbes	Porsche 997 GT3-RSR	M	472
19	GT2	75	(Australia) Juniper Racing	(Australia) Shaun Juniper (Australia) Max Twigg (New Zealand) Craig Baird (Australia) Rodney Forbes	Porsche 3.8 L Flat-6	M	472
20	G3	141	(France) Emeraude Racing	(France) Rémy Brouard (France) Philippe Noziere (France) Thierry Stépec (France) Tony Samon	Porsche 997 GT3 Cup S	M	468
20	G3	141	(France) Emeraude Racing	(France) Rémy Brouard (France) Philippe Noziere (France) Thierry Stépec (France) Tony Samon	Porsche 3.6 L Flat-6	M	468
21 DNF	GT1	6	(Germany) Phoenix Carsport Racing	(Switzerland) Jean-Denis Délétraz (Switzerland) Marcel Fässler (Netherlands) Mike Hezemans (Italy) Fabrizio Gollin	Chevrolet Corvette C6.R	M	460
21 DNF	GT1	6	(Germany) Phoenix Carsport Racing	(Switzerland) Jean-Denis Délétraz (Switzerland) Marcel Fässler (Netherlands) Mike Hezemans (Italy) Fabrizio Gollin	Chevrolet LS7R 7.0 L V8	M	460
22	G3	106	(Belgium) Delahaye Racing	(Belgium) Damien Coens (Belgium) Armand Fumal (Belgium) Julien Schroyen (Monaco) Marc Faggionato	Ferrari F430 GT3	P	459
22	G3	106	(Belgium) Delahaye Racing	(Belgium) Damien Coens (Belgium) Armand Fumal (Belgium) Julien Schroyen (Monaco) Marc Faggionato	Ferrari 4.3 L V8	P	459
23 DNF	G3	174	(France) Sport Garage	(France) Gaël Lesoudier (France) Romain Brandela (France) Arnaud Peyroles (United Kingdom) Hector Lester	Ferrari F430 GT3	P	402
23 DNF	G3	174	(France) Sport Garage	(France) Gaël Lesoudier (France) Romain Brandela (France) Arnaud Peyroles (United Kingdom) Hector Lester	Ferrari 4.3 L V8	P	402
24 DNF	GT2	59	(United Kingdom) Trackspeed Racing	(United Kingdom) Richard Williams (United Kingdom) David Ashburn (United Kingdom) Tim Sugden (France) Xavier Pompidou	Porsche 997 GT3-RSR	P	382
24 DNF	GT2	59	(United Kingdom) Trackspeed Racing	(United Kingdom) Richard Williams (United Kingdom) David Ashburn (United Kingdom) Tim Sugden (France) Xavier Pompidou	Porsche 3.8 L Flat-6	P	382
25 DNF	GT2	70	(Italy) Easy Race SRL	(Italy) Maurice Basso (Italy) Paolo Tenchini (Italy) Roberto Plati (Belgium) Bertrand Baguette	Ferrari F430 GT2	P	350
25 DNF	GT2	70	(Italy) Easy Race SRL	(Italy) Maurice Basso (Italy) Paolo Tenchini (Italy) Roberto Plati (Belgium) Bertrand Baguette	Ferrari 4.0 L V8	P	350
26 DNF	G3	122	(United Kingdom) Team Eurotech Preci Spark	(United Kingdom) David Jones (United Kingdom) Godfrey Jones (United Kingdom) Mike Jordan	Ascari KZ1R	D	323
26 DNF	G3	122	(United Kingdom) Team Eurotech Preci Spark	(United Kingdom) David Jones (United Kingdom) Godfrey Jones (United Kingdom) Mike Jordan	BMW 5.0 L V8	D	323
27	**Coupe du Roi**	**180**	**(Monaco) JMB Racing**	**(Netherlands) Peter Kutemann (Italy) Andrea Garbagnati**	**Ferrari F430 GT3**	M	**274**
27	**Coupe du Roi**	**180**	**(Monaco) JMB Racing**	**(Netherlands) Peter Kutemann (Italy) Andrea Garbagnati**	**Ferrari 4.3 L V8**	M	**274**
27	**Coupe du Roi**	**181**	**(Monaco) JMB Racing**	**(France) Philippe Rambeaud (France) Nicolas Comar**	**Ferrari F430 GT3**	M	**274**
27	**Coupe du Roi**	**181**	**(Monaco) JMB Racing**	**(France) Philippe Rambeaud (France) Nicolas Comar**	**Ferrari 4.3 L V8**	M	**274**
27	**Coupe du Roi**	**182**	**(Monaco) JMB Racing**	**(France) Pascal Ballay (France) Johan-Boris Scheier**	**Ferrari F430 GT3**	M	**274**
27	**Coupe du Roi**	**182**	**(Monaco) JMB Racing**	**(France) Pascal Ballay (France) Johan-Boris Scheier**	**Ferrari 4.3 L V8**	M	**274**
28 DNF	G3	108	(Belgium) Ice Pol Racing Team (Belgium) GPR Pino Racing	(Belgium) Marc Duez (Belgium) Koen Wauters (Belgium) Ludovic Sougnez (Belgium) Olivier Muytjens	Porsche 997 GT3 Cup S	M	267
28 DNF	G3	108	(Belgium) Ice Pol Racing Team (Belgium) GPR Pino Racing	(Belgium) Marc Duez (Belgium) Koen Wauters (Belgium) Ludovic Sougnez (Belgium) Olivier Muytjens	Porsche 3.6 L Flat-6	M	267
29 DNF	GT1	4	(Belgium) Peka Racing	(Belgium) Anthony Kumpen (Belgium) Bert Longin (Belgium) Fred Bouvy (Belgium) Kurt Mollekens	Saleen S7-R	P	255
29 DNF	GT1	4	(Belgium) Peka Racing	(Belgium) Anthony Kumpen (Belgium) Bert Longin (Belgium) Fred Bouvy (Belgium) Kurt Mollekens	Ford 7.0 L V8	P	255
30 DNF	G3	116	(Belgium) Signa Racing	(Belgium) Patrick Chaillet (Belgium) Christophe Geoffroy (Belgium) Benoit Galland (Belgium) Pierre-Yves Rosoux	Dodge Viper Competition Coupe	M	229
30 DNF	G3	116	(Belgium) Signa Racing	(Belgium) Patrick Chaillet (Belgium) Christophe Geoffroy (Belgium) Benoit Galland (Belgium) Pierre-Yves Rosoux	Dodge 8.3 L V10	M	229
31 DNF	G2	102	(Belgium) McDonald's Racing (Belgium) PMB Motorsport	(Germany) Wolfgang Kaufmann (Germany) Kenneth Heyer (Belarus) Alexander Talkanitsa (France) Philippe Ullmann	Porsche 911 GT2 Bi-Turbo	M	229
31 DNF	G2	102	(Belgium) McDonald's Racing (Belgium) PMB Motorsport	(Germany) Wolfgang Kaufmann (Germany) Kenneth Heyer (Belarus) Alexander Talkanitsa (France) Philippe Ullmann	Porsche 3.6 L Turbo Flat-6	M	229
32 DNF	GT2	51	(Italy) AF Corse	(Italy) Thomas Biagi (San Marino) Christian Montanari (Argentina) Matías Russo (Germany) Dominik Farnbacher	Ferrari F430 GT2	M	225
32 DNF	GT2	51	(Italy) AF Corse	(Italy) Thomas Biagi (San Marino) Christian Montanari (Argentina) Matías Russo (Germany) Dominik Farnbacher	Ferrari 4.0 L V8	M	225
33 DNF	G3	115	(Austria) S-Berg Racing	(Austria) Hans Knauss (Austria) Dominik Kraihamer (Russia) Vadim Kuzminykh (United Kingdom) Martin Rich	Lamborghini Gallardo GT3	M	196
33 DNF	G3	115	(Austria) S-Berg Racing	(Austria) Hans Knauss (Austria) Dominik Kraihamer (Russia) Vadim Kuzminykh (United Kingdom) Martin Rich	Lamborghini 5.0 L V10	M	196
34 DNF	GT2	60	(Belgium) Prospeed Competition	(Finland) Markus Palttala (Finland) Mikael Forsten (Germany) Wolf Henzler (Belgium) Geoffroy Horion	Porsche 997 GT3-RSR	M	183
34 DNF	GT2	60	(Belgium) Prospeed Competition	(Finland) Markus Palttala (Finland) Mikael Forsten (Germany) Wolf Henzler (Belgium) Geoffroy Horion	Porsche 4.0 L Flat-6	M	183
35 DNF	GT1	33	(Austria) Jetalliance Racing	(Austria) Karl Wendlinger (United Kingdom) Ryan Sharp (Austria) Lukas Lichtner-Hoyer (Germany) Alex Müller	Aston Martin DBR9	M	151
35 DNF	GT1	33	(Austria) Jetalliance Racing	(Austria) Karl Wendlinger (United Kingdom) Ryan Sharp (Austria) Lukas Lichtner-Hoyer (Germany) Alex Müller	Aston Martin 6.0 L V12	M	151
36 DNF	G2	101	(Belgium) Belgian Racing	(Belgium) Bas Leinders (Belgium) Renaud Kuppens (Belgium) Maxime Martin	Gillet Vertigo Streiff	P	145
36 DNF	G2	101	(Belgium) Belgian Racing	(Belgium) Bas Leinders (Belgium) Renaud Kuppens (Belgium) Maxime Martin	Maserati 4.2 L V8	P	145
37 DNF	GT1	5	(Germany) Phoenix Carsport Racing	(Greece) Alexandros Margaritis (Netherlands) Jos Menten (Germany) Robert Schlünssen (Germany) Uwe Alzen	Chevrolet Corvette C6.R	M	140
37 DNF	GT1	5	(Germany) Phoenix Carsport Racing	(Greece) Alexandros Margaritis (Netherlands) Jos Menten (Germany) Robert Schlünssen (Germany) Uwe Alzen	Chevrolet LS7R 7.0 L V8	M	140
38 DNF	G3	175	(France) Sport Garage	(Belgium) Eddy Renard (United Kingdom) Robert Hissom (France) Stéphane Lacroix-Wasover (France) Philippe Thirion	Ferrari F430 GT3	P	122
38 DNF	G3	175	(France) Sport Garage	(Belgium) Eddy Renard (United Kingdom) Robert Hissom (France) Stéphane Lacroix-Wasover (France) Philippe Thirion	Ferrari 4.3 L V8	P	122
39 DNF	G3	140	(France) Emeraude Racing	(France) Olivier Baron (France) Patrice Fournet (France) André Alain Corbel (France) Manuel Ferreira	Porsche 997 GT3 Cup S	M	92
39 DNF	G3	140	(France) Emeraude Racing	(France) Olivier Baron (France) Patrice Fournet (France) André Alain Corbel (France) Manuel Ferreira	Porsche 3.6 L Flat-6	M	92
40 DNF	G3	121	(France) Exagon Engineering	(France) Éric Hélary (Belgium) Vincent Radermecker (France) Daniel Desbruères (France) Catherine Desbruères	Ferrari F430 GT3	M	31
40 DNF	G3	121	(France) Exagon Engineering	(France) Éric Hélary (Belgium) Vincent Radermecker (France) Daniel Desbruères (France) Catherine Desbruères	Ferrari 4.3 L V8	M	31
41 DNF	GT1	3	(Belgium) Selleslagh Racing Team	(France) Christophe Bouchut (Netherlands) Xavier Maassen (Belgium) Maxime Soulet (Switzerland) Christophe Pillon	Chevrolet Corvette C6.R	M	12
41 DNF	GT1	3	(Belgium) Selleslagh Racing Team	(France) Christophe Bouchut (Netherlands) Xavier Maassen (Belgium) Maxime Soulet (Switzerland) Christophe Pillon	Chevrolet LS7R 7.0 L V8	M	12
DNS	GT1	7	(France) Larbre Compétition	(Belgium) Vincent Vosse (Belgium) Grégory Franchi (Portugal) Pedro Lamy (Switzerland) Steve Zacchia	Saleen S7-R	M	–
DNS	GT1	7	(France) Larbre Compétition	(Belgium) Vincent Vosse (Belgium) Grégory Franchi (Portugal) Pedro Lamy (Switzerland) Steve Zacchia	Ford 7.0 L V8	M	–

== Statistics ==
- Pole Position – #7 Larbre Compétition – 2:13.923
- Average Speed – 168.07 km/h
- Total Distance – 4041.885 km

FIA GT Championship
Previous race: 2008 FIA GT Oschersleben 2 Hours	2008 season	Next race: 2008 FIA GT Bucharest 2 Hours
