= Belcar =

European auto racing series

Belcar Endurance Series
- Category: Endurance racing
- Inaugural season: 1990
- Drivers' champion: (Sweden) Robin Knutsson (Belgium) Glenn Van Parijs (Belgium) Cédric Wauters
- Makes' champion: Porsche
- Teams' champion: (Belgium) D'Ieteren Luxury Performance by NGT
- Official website: Belcar Series

The Belcar Endurance Championship is the top-tier national endurance racing championship in Belgium. The series is sanctioned by the Royal Automobile Club of Belgium and run by Circuit Zolder.

== History ==
The Belcar series has its roots in the early 1990s, with the local Flemish championships BBL Endurance Cup and the Carglass Cup. Both were sanctioned by the Flemish autosport federation VAS. In 1997 the very successful Carglass Cup was upgraded to an RACB-sanctioned series and first used the name Belcar as the Carglass Cup Belcar. From 1998 the championship dropped the Carglass name and became known as Belcar. Its title sponsors were Castrol (1998-2001) and later Mediagroep Van Dyck.

In 2012, a conflict between the championship promotor Speedworld and the RACB led to the series' demise. Belcar was succeeded by a new series under the name Belgian Racing Car Championship, with Kronos Events as the new championship promotor.

In 2015, Circuit Zolder relaunched the Belcar under the name Belcar Trophy. It ran in parallel to the BRCC, but eventually became Belgium's top-tier endurance championship again in 2016 with Kronos Events ending the BRCC after the 2015 season. The series was renamed as Belcar Endurance Championship in 2016 and still runs under that name today.

== Races ==
The Belcar has historically had a very regular calendar. The season usually starts and ends with a race at Circuit Zolder, with the New Race Festival being the season opener from 1990-2006 and again since 2015 and the NASCAR Euro Series event being the closing event since 2016. The highlight of the season has always been the Zolder 24 Hours, which usually takes place in August.

There are also at least one or two events at Circuit de Spa-Francorchamps and usually one event in a neighboring country, with Assen, Dijon-Prenois and Nürburgring being the most visited tracks.

Besides the Zolder 24 Hours, the race lengths are usually 180 minutes. However, there have been events where the race has been split into 2 or 3 shorter sprint races.

== Classes ==
As of the 2025 season, all cars are split into the following classes

- Grand Touring Cup
  - Porsche 911 GT3 Cup cars
  - GT Cup cars > 3300 cm³
  - FIA GT3 cars with expired homologation or expiring in the current year
  - Silhouette Pro and Pro Evo
  - GTC Open
- Grand Touring Sport
  - Porsche Cayman Cup cars
  - FIA GT4 cars
  - Silhouette Light
  - GTS Open
- Super Sport
  - Touring cars > 4000cc
  - Touring cars between 2800cc and 4000cc
  - TCR cars
  - SS Open
- Club Sport
  - Touring cars > 2500cc and < 2800cc
  - NLS VT2 Class cars
  - CS Open
- Club Challenge
  - Touring & GT cars < 2500cc
  - CC Open

== Champions ==
=== List of overall Champions ===
Year	Championship name	Driver(s)	Team	Car
1990	BBL Endurance Cup	(Belgium) Etienne Dumortier (Belgium) Baudoin de Rosee	(Belgium) JED2 Racing	Volvo 240 Turbo
1991	BBL Endurance Cup	(Belgium) Erik Bruynoghe (Belgium) Guy Verheyen		Peugeot 309 Turbo
1992	Carglass Cup	(Belgium) Daniel Hubert (Belgium) Patrick Hubert		BMW 335i
1993	Carglass Cup	(Belgium) Peter Eliano (Belgium) Jean-Pierre Mondron (Belgium) Didier Wuydts		Honda Civic
1994	Carglass Cup	(Belgium) Georges Cremer (Belgium) Paul Kumpen (Belgium) Albert Vanierschot	(Belgium) Peka Racing	Porsche 993
1995	Carglass Cup	(Belgium) Georges Cremer (Belgium) Paul Kumpen (Belgium) Albert Vanierschot	(Belgium) Peka Racing	Porsche 993
1996	Carglass Cup	(Belgium) Marc Duez (Belgium) Daniel Hubert (Belgium) Patrick Hubert		BMW M3
1997	Carglass Cup Belcar	(Belgium) Georges Cremer (Belgium) Vincent Dupont (Belgium) Fons Taels	(Belgium) GLPK Racing	Porsche 993
1998	Castrol Belcar	(Belgium) Jean-François Hemroulle (Belgium) Tim Verbergt	(Belgium) Dubois Racing	Audi A4 Quattro
1999	Castrol Belcar	(Belgium) Jean-François Hemroulle (Belgium) Tim Verbergt	(Belgium) Dubois Racing	Audi A4 Quattro
2000	Castrol Belcar	(Belgium) Stéphane Cohen	(Belgium) GLPK Racing	Chrysler Viper GTS-R
2001	Castrol Belcar	(Finland) Pertti Kuismanen	(Finland) Kuismanen Competition	Audi 80 Compétition
2002	Mediagroep Van Dyck Belcar	(Belgium) Anthony Kumpen (Belgium) Bert Longin	(Belgium) GLPK Racing	Chrysler Viper GTS-R
2003	Mediagroep Van Dyck Belcar	(Belgium) Vincent Dupont (Belgium) Anthony Kumpen (Belgium) Bert Longin	(Belgium) GLPK Racing	Chrysler Viper GTS-R
2004	Mediagroep Van Dyck Belcar	(Belgium) Anthony Kumpen (Belgium) Bert Longin	(Belgium) GLPK Racing	Chrysler Viper GTS-R
2005	Mediagroep Van Dyck Belcar	(Belgium) Marc Goossens (Netherlands) David Hart	(Belgium) Selleslagh Racing Team	Chevrolet Corvette C5-R
2006	Mediagroep Van Dyck Belcar	(Belgium) Anthony Kumpen (Belgium) Bert Longin	(Belgium) GLPK Racing	Chevrolet Corvette C5-R
2007	Mediagroep Van Dyck Belcar	(Belgium) Bart Couwberghs	(Belgium) GPR Racing	Porsche 997 GT3 Cup
2008	Belgian GT Championship	(Belgium) Frédéric Bouvy (Belgium) Damien Coens	(Belgium) Delahaye Racing	Ferrari F430 GT3
2009	Belgian GT Championship	(Belgium) Jean-François Hemroulle (Belgium) Tim Verbergt	(Germany) Phoenix Racing	Audi R8 LMS
2010	Belcar Endurance Championship	(Belgium) Anthony Kumpen (Belgium) Greg Franchi	(Belgium) W Racing Team	Audi R8 LMS
2011	Belcar Endurance Championship	(Belgium) Marc Goossens (Belgium) Maxime Soulet	(Belgium) Prospeed Competition	Porsche 997 GT3 R
2012	Belgian Racing Car Championship	(Belgium) Frédéric Bouvy	(Belgium) Prospeed Competition	Porsche 996 GT3 RS
2013	Belgian Racing Car Championship	(Belgium) Anthony Kumpen (Belgium) Bert Longin (Belgium) Maarten Makelberge	(Belgium) PK Carsport	Audi R8 LMS
2014	Belgian Racing Car Championship	(Belgium) Bert Redant (Belgium) Tim Verbergt	(Belgium) Brussels Racing	Aston Martin Vantage GT3
2015	Belgian Racing Car Championship	(Belgium) Dylan Derdaele	Belgium Racing	Porsche 991 Cup
2016	Belcar Endurance Championship	(Belgium) Luc De Cock (Belgium) Sam Dejonghe (Belgium) Tim Joosen	(Belgium) Deldiche Racing	Norma M20-FC
2017	Belcar Endurance Championship	(Belgium) François Bouillon (Belgium) David Houthoofd (Belgium) Frédéric Vervisch	(Belgium) McDonald's Racing	Norma M20-FC
2018	Belcar Endurance Championship	(Belgium) Jeffrey van Hooydonk (Belgium) Gilles Magnus (Belgium) Frank Thiers (Belgium) Hans Thiers	(Belgium) Russell Racing by DVB Racing	Norma M20-FC
2019	Belcar Endurance Championship	(Belgium) Dylan Derdaele (Belgium) Nicolas Saelens	Belgium Racing	Lamborghini Super Trofeo; Porsche 991 Cup
2020	Belcar Endurance Championship	(Belgium) Dylan Derdaele (Belgium) Nicolas Saelens	Belgium Racing	Lamborghini Super Trofeo
2021	Belcar Endurance Championship	(Belgium) Dylan Derdaele (Belgium) Nicolas Saelens	Belgium Racing	Porsche 992 GT3 Cup
2022	Belcar Endurance Championship	(Belgium) Peter Guelinckx (Belgium) Bert Longin (Belgium) Stienes Longin	(Belgium) PK Carsport	Audi R8 LMS GT2
2023	Belcar Endurance Championship	(Belgium) Peter Guelinckx (Belgium) Bert Longin (Belgium) Stienes Longin	(Belgium) PK Carsport	Audi R8 LMS GT2
2024	Belcar Endurance Championship	(Belgium) Dylan Derdaele (Belgium) Jan Lauryssen	Belgium Racing	Porsche 992 GT3 Cup
2025	Belcar Endurance Championship	(Sweden) Robin Knutsson (Belgium) Glenn Van Parijs (Belgium) Cédric Wauters	(Belgium) D'Ieteren Luxury Performance by NGT	Porsche 992 GT3 Cup
2026	Belcar Endurance Championship	(Netherlands) Paul Meijer (Belgium) Dylan Derdaele (Belgium) Nicolas Saelens	Belgium Racing	Porsche 992 GT3 Cup

=== By driver ===
Multiple championships by driver
Wins	Driver	Years
7	(Belgium) Bert Longin	2002, 2003, 2004, 2006, 2013, 2022, 2023
6	(Belgium) Anthony Kumpen	2002, 2003, 2004, 2006, 2010, 2013
6	(Belgium) Dylan Derdaele	2015, 2019, 2020, 2021, 2024, 2026
4	(Belgium) Tim Verbergt	1998, 1999, 2009, 2014
4	(Belgium) Nicolas Saelens	2019, 2020, 2021, 2026
3	(Belgium) Georges Cremer	1994, 1995, 1997
3	(Belgium) Jean-François Hemroulle	1998, 1999, 2009
2	(Belgium) Daniel Hubert	1992, 1996
2	(Belgium) Patrick Hubert	1992, 1996
2	(Belgium) Albert Vanierschot	1994, 1995
2	(Belgium) Paul Kumpen	1994, 1995
2	(Belgium) Vincent Dupont	1997, 2003
2	(Belgium) Marc Goossens	2005, 2011
2	(Belgium) Frédéric Bouvy	2008, 2012
2	(Belgium) Peter Guelinckx	2022, 2023
2	(Belgium) Stienes Longin	2022, 2023

=== By team ===
Multiple championships by team
Wins	Team	Years
11	(Belgium) PK Carsport/GLPK Racing	1994, 1995, 1997, 2000, 2002, 2003, 2004, 2006, 2013, 2022, 2023
6	Belgium Racing	2015, 2019, 2020, 2021, 2024, 2026
2	(Belgium) Dubois Racing	1998, 1999
2	(Belgium) Prospeed Competition	2011, 2012

== Race wins ==
=== By driver ===
Last updated 03 May 2026, listing drivers with 10+ wins only

Rank	Driver	Wins
1	(Belgium) Bert Longin	40
2	(Belgium) Anthony Kumpen	37
3	(Belgium) Marc Goossens	18
4	(Belgium) Tim Verbergt	16
5	(Belgium) Frédéric Bouvy	14
5	(Belgium) Hans Thiers	14
5	(Belgium) Stéphane Cohen	14
8	(Belgium) Dylan Derdaele	13
9	(Belgium) David Hart	12
9	(Belgium) Jeffrey Van Hooydonk	12
9	(Belgium) Maxime Soulet	12

=== By team ===
Last updated 03 May 2026, listing teams with 5+ wins only

Rank	Driver	Wins
1	(Belgium) PK Carsport/GLPK Racing	45
2	(Belgium) GPR Racing	16
3	(Belgium) RTM Racing/Prospeed	14
4	Belgium Racing	13
5	(Belgium) Russell Racing	12
6	(Belgium) Deldiche Racing	9
7	(Belgium) Gravity Racing	8
8	(Belgium) Selleslagh Racing Team	7
8	(Belgium) W Racing Team	7
10	(Belgium) David Hart Vastgoed Racing	6
11	(Belgium) Delahaye Racing	5
11	(Belgium) KRK Racing	5
11	(Belgium) NGT Racing	5
