= Maxime Soulet =

Belgian racing driver

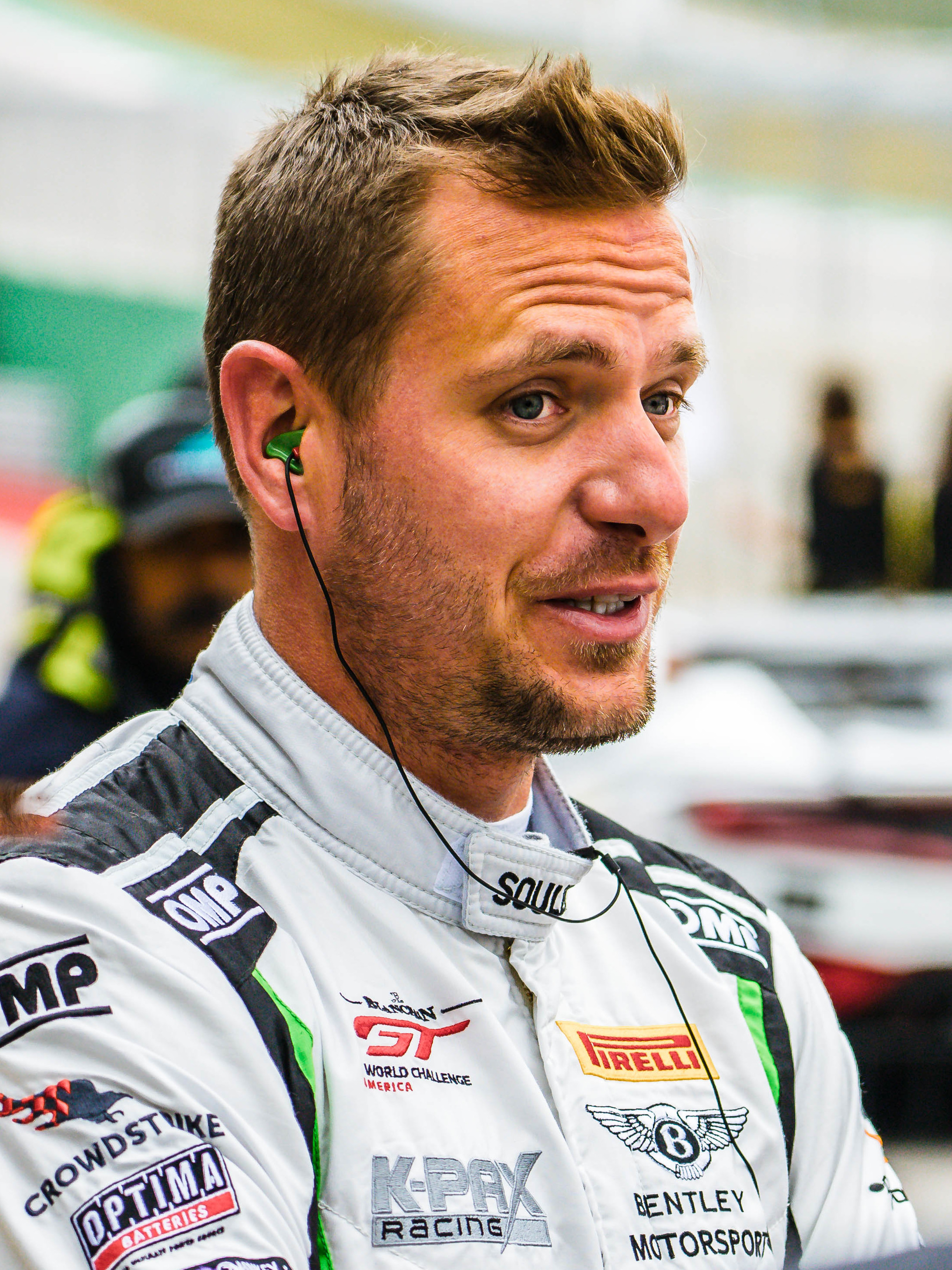
- Soulet at the Circuit of the Americas in 2019
- Nationality: (Belgium) Belgian
- Born: Maxime Eric Fabien Marcel Soulet; 26 July 1983 (age 43) Uccle, Belgium
- Categorisation: FIA Silver (until 2012); FIA Gold (2013–)

Previous series
- 2018–20 2016–20 2011–13, 15–20 2008–09, 11: GT World Challenge America; Intercontinental GT Challenge; Blancpain Endurance Series; Belcar

Championship titles
- 2023 2011 2011 2004 2004: GT World Challenge Europe Endurance Cup – Gold Cup; Belcar Endurance Championship; Belcar – GT3; Formula Renault 1.6 Belgium; Mini Cooper Challenge Belgium

Maxime Eric Fabien Marcel Soulet (born 26 July 1983) is a Belgian racing driver.

== Career ==
Soulet began his racing career in 2002, competing in two races in the French Formula Renault series. In 2004, Soulet competed in both the Mini Cooper Challenge Belgium and the Belgian Formula Renault 1.6 series, winning championship titles in both. In 2015, Soulet was signed as a Bentley factory driver in the then-Blancpain GT Series. Soulet's best overall season with the marque occurred in 2017, when he and co-drivers Vincent Abril and Andy Soucek came within seven points of winning the GT World Challenge Europe Endurance Cup. They entered the final round with an eight-point advantage, but retired during the final race while their closest competitor finished third. For 2018, Soulet signed with K-Pax Racing alongside fellow factory driver Soucek. Two years later, Soulet was part of the Bentley Team M-Sport team that won the 2020 Bathurst 12 Hour. After Bentley's factory GT3 program wound down at the end of 2020, Soulet joined Selleslagh Racing Team for the final three rounds of the 2021 GT4 European Series. Soulet returned to the wheel of a Bentley Continental GT3 in 2022, joining customer team CMR's entry into the 2022 24 Hours of Spa. Also in 2022, Soulet took part in the Porsche Carrera Cup Benelux with August Racing by NGT. He would finish ninth in the overall championship, scoring 65 points.

In 2023, Soulet joined HAAS RT, initially competing in the 2023 Dubai 24 Hour. Additionally, Soulet returned full-time to the GT World Challenge Europe Endurance Cup, competing with Comtoyou Racing in the Gold Cup category alongside Nicolas Baert and Max Hofer. After winning their class in the first two races of the season, Baert and Soulet claimed the Gold Cup championship at season's end.

== Racing record ==
=== Career summary ===
Season	Series	Team	Races	Wins	Poles	F/Laps	Podiums	Points	Position
2002	Formula Renault 2.0 West European Cup	CD Sport	2	0	0	0	0	0	NC
2004	Mini Cooper Challenge Belgium	J.M. Martin	15	2	?	?	7	176	**1st**
2004	Formula Renault 1.6 Belgium	Thierry Boutsen Racing	14	3	?	?	11	176	**1st**
2005	Formula BMW USA	Gelles Racing	14	0	?	?	5	98	7th
2006	Formula A3 Volkswagen	N/A	2	1	?	?	?	0	NC
2006	FIA GT Championship	SRT Team	1	0	0	?	0	0	NC
2007	THP Spider Cup	Boutsen Energy Racing	7	1	0	2	3	66	9th
2007	Eurocup Mégane Trophy	Boutsen Energy Racing	2	0	0	0	0	1	23rd
2007	GT4 European Cup	GPR Racing	6	1	3	1	3	26	4th
2007	FIA GT3 European Championship	Matech Racing	2	0	0	0	0	4	17th
2007	FIA GT Championship	Selleslagh Racing Team	2	0	0	?	0	2	24th
2008	Belgian GT Championship	N/A	11	3	?	?	5	117	**3rd**
2008	Belgian Touring Car Series - S2	Street Machine	?	?	?	?	?	62	7th
2008	French GT Championship	Selleslagh Racing Team	4	0	0	1	1	0	NC
2008	FIA GT Championship	Selleslagh Racing Team	2	0	0	0	1	6	21st
2008	Formula Volkswagen South Africa	N/A	2	0	0	1	1	0	NC
2009	Belgian GT Championship	First Motorsport; Barwell Motorsport	2	0	?	?	0	15	25th
2009	FIA GT Championship	Selleslagh Racing Team	1	0	0	0	0	4	20th
2010	FIA GT3 European Cup	Prospeed Competition	1	0	0	0	0	?	?
2011	Belcar Endurance Championship	Prospeed Competition	6	4	1	1	6	126	**1st**
2011	Belcar - GT3	Prospeed Competition	5	4	0	0	5	48	**1st**
2011	FIA GT3 European Championship	Prospeed Competition	12	2	0	0	2	71	12th
2011	Blancpain Endurance Series - Pro	Prospeed Competition	1	0	0	0	0	0.5	34th
2011	Belgian Touring Car Series - S1	Delahaye Racing Team 1	2	0	0	0	0	0	NC
2012	Blancpain Endurance Series - Pro-Am	Prospeed Competition	6	0	0	0	0	26	18th
2012	European Le Mans Series - GTE Am	Prospeed Competition	1	1	0	0	1	26	**3rd**
2012	Rolex Sports Car Series - GT	Racers Edge Motorsports	1	0	0	0	0	16	68th
2013	International GT Open - GTS	GPR Racing	8	3	1	1	5	44	5th
2013	Blancpain Endurance Series - Pro	Prospeed Competition	4	0	0	0	0	14	21st
2014	International GT Open - Super GT	Selleslagh Racing Team SRT	14	2	2	2	9	81	4th
2014	European Le Mans Series - GTC	Prospeed Competition	3	0	0	0	0	2	30th
2014	Porsche GT3 Cup Challenge Benelux	Allure	2	0	0	2	1	26	20th
2014	Belgian Racing Car Championship	SRT	2	0	0	0	0	0	NC
2015	Blancpain Endurance Series - Pro	Bentley Team M-Sport	5	0	0	0	0	31	10th
2016	Blancpain GT Series Sprint Cup	Bentley Team M-Sport	10	1	0	0	3	47	8th
2016	Blancpain GT Series Endurance Cup	Bentley Team M-Sport	4	0	0	0	1	59	**3rd**
2016	Intercontinental GT Challenge	Bentley Team M-Sport	2	0	0	0	1	25	7th
2016	VLN Series - SP9	Bentley Team ABT	1	0	0	0	0	0	NC
2017	Blancpain GT Series Sprint Cup	Bentley Team M-Sport	9	0	0	0	0	4	23rd
2017	Blancpain GT Endurance Sprint Cup	Bentley Team M-Sport	5	1	0	0	2	79	**2nd**
2017	Intercontinental GT Challenge	Bentley Team M-Sport	2	0	0	0	1	20	7th
2017	24 Hours of Nürburgring - SP9-LG	Bentley Team Abt	1	0	?	?	1	N/A	**3rd**
2018	Pirelli World Challenge - GT Pro	K-Pax Racing	10	1	1	2	2	170	13th
2018	Blancpain GT Series Endurance Cup	Bentley Team M-Sport	5	0	0	0	0	17	26th
2018	Intercontinental GT Challenge	Bentley Team M-Sport	4	0	0	0	0	16	15th
2019	Blancpain GT World Challenge America	K-Pax Racing	14	2	0	2	11	140	4th
2019	Blancpain GT Series Endurance Cup	Bentley Team M-Sport	5	0	0	0	0	17	15th
2019	Intercontinental GT Challenge	Bentley Team M-Sport	4	0	0	0	0	10	25th
2020	GT World Challenge Europe Endurance Cup	Bentley K-Pax Racing	4	0	0	0	0	6	23rd
2020	Intercontinental GT Challenge	Bentley Team M-Sport	2	1	0	0	1	28	7th
2020	Intercontinental GT Challenge	K-Pax Racing	2	0	0	0	0	28	7th
2020	24 Hours of Nürburgring - SP9	GetSpeed Performance	1	0	0	0	0	N/A	16th
2021	GT4 European Series - Pro-Am	Selleslagh Racing Team	6	0	0	0	3	83	5th
2021	24 Hours of Nürburgring - SP9	GetSpeed Performance	1	0	0	0	0	N/A	14th
2022	Stock Car Brasil	Crown Racing	1	0	0	0	0	0	NC†
2022	Porsche Carrera Cup Benelux	August Racing by NGT Racing							
2022	GT World Challenge Europe Endurance Cup	Classic & Modern Racing	1	0	0	0	0	0	NC
2022-23	Middle East Trophy - GT3	HAAS RT	2	0	?	?	1	56	**2nd**
2023	GT World Challenge Europe Endurance Cup	Comtoyou Racing	5	0	0	0	0	8	18th
2023	GT World Challenge Europe Endurance Cup - Gold Cup	Comtoyou Racing	5	2	0	1	3	104	**1st**
2023	Nürburgring Langstrecken-Serie - SP9 Pro/Am	CP Racing	2	0	?	?	1	0	N/A

=== Complete Grand-Am Rolex Sports Car Series results ===
(key) (Races in bold indicate pole position)

Year	Team	Class	Make	Engine	1	2	3	4	5	6	7	8	9	10	11	12	13	Rank	Points
2012	Racers Edge Motorsports	GT	Dodge Viper Competition Coupe	Dodge 8.0 L V10	DAY; 42	BAR	MIA	JER	DET	MOH	ELK	WGL	IMS	WGL	MON	LGA	LIM	68th	16

=== Complete 24 Hours of Spa results ===
Year	Team	Co-Drivers	Car	Class	Laps	Pos.	Class Pos.
2006	(Belgium) Renstal Excelsior	(United Kingdom) Chris Buncombe (Netherlands) David Hart (Monaco) Geoffroy Horion	Chevrolet Corvette C5-R	GT1	52	DNF	DNF
2007	(Belgium) Selleslagh Racing Team	(Belgium) Damien Coens (Belgium) Marc Duez (Belgium) Steve Van Bellingen	Chevrolet Corvette C5-R	GT1	502	10th	8th
2008	(Belgium) Selleslagh Racing Team	(France) Christophe Bouchut (Netherlands) Xavier Maassen (Switzerland) Christophe Pillon	Chevrolet Corvette C6-R	GT1	12	DNF	DNF
2009	(Belgium) Selleslagh Racing Team	(United Kingdom) Oliver Gavin (Belgium) Bert Longin (France) James Ruffier	Chevrolet Corvette C6-R	GT1	485	15th	5th
2010	(Belgium) Prospeed Competition	(Netherlands) Jos Menten (Belgium) Julien Schroyen (Belgium) Oskar Slingerland	Porsche 997 GT3-R	GT3	488	15th	7th
2011	(Belgium) Prospeed Competition	(Belgium) Marc Goossens (Belgium) Jan Heylen	Porsche 997 GT3-RSR	GT2	331	DNF	DNF
2012	(Belgium) Prospeed Competition	(Belgium) Frédéric Bouvy (Belgium) Dylan Derdaele (Netherlands) Paul Van Splunteren	Porsche 997 GT3-R	Pro-Am	485	13th	8th
2013	(Belgium) Prospeed Competition	(Germany) Marc Hennerici (Netherlands) Xavier Maassen	Porsche 997 GT3-R	Pro Cup	550	9th	5th
2015	(United Kingdom) Bentley Team M-Sport	(Germany) Maximilian Buhk (Spain) Andy Soucek	Bentley Continental GT3	Pro Cup	258	DNF	DNF
2016	(United Kingdom) Bentley Team M-Sport	(Belgium) Wolfgang Reip (Spain) Andy Soucek	Bentley Continental GT3	Pro Cup	530	4th	4th
2017	(United Kingdom) Bentley Team M-Sport	(Monaco) Vincent Abril (Spain) Andy Soucek	Bentley Continental GT3	Pro Cup	546	2nd	2nd
2018	(United Kingdom) Bentley Team M-Sport	(Monaco) Vincent Abril (Spain) Andy Soucek	Bentley Continental GT3	Pro Cup	349	DNF	DNF
2019	(United Kingdom) Bentley Team M-Sport	(United Kingdom) Alex Buncombe (Finland) Markus Palttala	Bentley Continental GT3	Pro Cup	118	DNF	DNF
2020	(United States) K-Pax Racing	(France) Jules Gounon (South Africa) Jordan Pepper	Bentley Continental GT3	Pro Cup	525	10th	10th
2022	(France) Classic and Modern Racing	(Belgium) Nigel Bailly (Switzerland) Antonin Borga (Belgium) Stéphane Lémeret	Bentley Continental GT3	Gold Cup	187	DNF	DNF
2023	(Belgium) Comtoyou Racing	(Belgium) Nicolas Baert (Austria) Max Hofer	Audi R8 LMS Evo II	Gold Cup	534	21st	3rd

=== Complete 24 Hours of Nürburgring results ===
Year	Team	Co-Drivers	Car	Class	Laps	Pos.	Class Pos.
2017	(Germany) Bentley Team Abt	(United Kingdom) Steven Kane (United Kingdom) Guy Smith	Bentley Continental GT3	SP9 LG	147	20th	3rd
2020	(Germany) GetSpeed Performance	(Finland) Markus Palttala (United States) Janine Shoffner (United States) John Shoffner	Mercedes-AMG GT3 Evo	SP9 GT3	79	17th	16th
2021	(Germany) GetSpeed Performance	(Germany) Moritz Kranz (Finland) Markus Palttala (United States) John Shoffner	Mercedes-AMG GT3 Evo	SP9 GT3	58	14th	14th

=== Complete Bathurst 12 Hour results ===
Year	Team	Co-Drivers	Car	Class	Laps	Pos.	Class Pos.
2016	(United Kingdom) Bentley Team M-Sport	(Australia) David Russell (Spain) Andy Soucek	Bentley Continental GT3	AP	293	7th	6th
2017	(United Kingdom) Bentley Team M-Sport	(Monaco) Vincent Abril (Spain) Andy Soucek	Bentley Continental GT3	APP	283	12th	5th
2018	(United Kingdom) Bentley Team M-Sport	(Monaco) Vincent Abril (Spain) Andy Soucek	Bentley Continental GT3	APP	58	46th	12th
2019	(United Kingdom) Bentley Team M-Sport	(Monaco) Vincent Abril (Spain) Andy Soucek	Bentley Continental GT3	APP	312	6th	6th
2020	(United Kingdom) Bentley Team M-Sport	(France) Jules Gounon (South Africa) Jordan Pepper	Bentley Continental GT3	A-GT3 Pro	314	1st	1st

=== Complete Stock Car Brasil results ===
(key) (Races in bold indicate pole position) (Races in italics indicate fastest lap)

Year	Team	Car	1	2	3	4	5	6	7	8	9	10	11	12	13	14	15	16	17	18	19	20	21	22	23	Rank	Points
2022	Crown Racing	Chevrolet Cruze	INT; 17	GOI; 1	GOI; 2	VCA; 1	VCA; 2	RIO; 1	RIO; 2	BRA; 1	BRA; 2	BRA; 1	BRA; 2	INT; 1	INT; 2	SCZ; 1	SCZ; 2	VCA; 1	VCA; 2	GOI; 1	GOI; 2	GOI; 1	GOI; 2	BRA; 1	BRA; 2		

^{†} Did not finish the race, but was classified as he completed over 90% of the race distance.

=== Complete 24 Hours of Zolder results ===
Year	Team	Co-Drivers	Car	Class	Laps	Pos.	Class Pos.
2005	(Belgium) BPO Racing	(Belgium) Bernard André (Belgium) Jonathan Moury (Canada) Ryan Campbell	Porsche 996 GT3 Cup	G		DNF	DNF
2006	(Belgium) Selleslagh Racing Team	(Belgium) Tom Cloet (Netherlands) David Hart (Belgium) Marc Duez	Chevrolet Corvette C5-R	1	828	1st	1st
2007	(Belgium) GPR Racing	(Belgium) Guillaume Dumarey (Belgium) Maxime Dumarey (Belgium) Marc Goossens	Porsche 997 GT3 Cup	Belcar 1	798	1st	1st
2008	(Belgium) GPR Racing	(Belgium) Gregory Franchi (Belgium) Christian Kelders (Belgium) Bas Leinders	Porsche 997 GT3 Cup S	Belcar 1		DNF	DNF
2009	(Belgium) Delahaye Racing Team	(Belgium) Marc Goossens (Belgium) Anthony Kumpen (Belgium) Ludovic Sougnez	Renault Mégane Trophy	4A		DNF	DNF
2011	(Belgium) Prospeed Competition	(Belgium) Marc Goossens (Belgium) David Loix (Finland) Markus Palttala	Porsche 996 GT3-RS	GTO+	800	2nd	1st
2012	(Belgium) Prospeed Competition	(Belgium) Frédéric Bouvy (Belgium) Marc Goossens (Belgium) Bert Redant	Porsche 997 GT3-R	GT-1	855	2nd	2nd

Sporting positions
Preceded by Brendan Iribe; Ollie Millroy; Frederik Schandorff	GT World Challenge Europe Endurance Cup; Gold Cup Champion; 2023; With: Nicolas Baert	Succeeded by Incumbent
