= Mike Hezemans =

Dutch racing driver (born 1969)

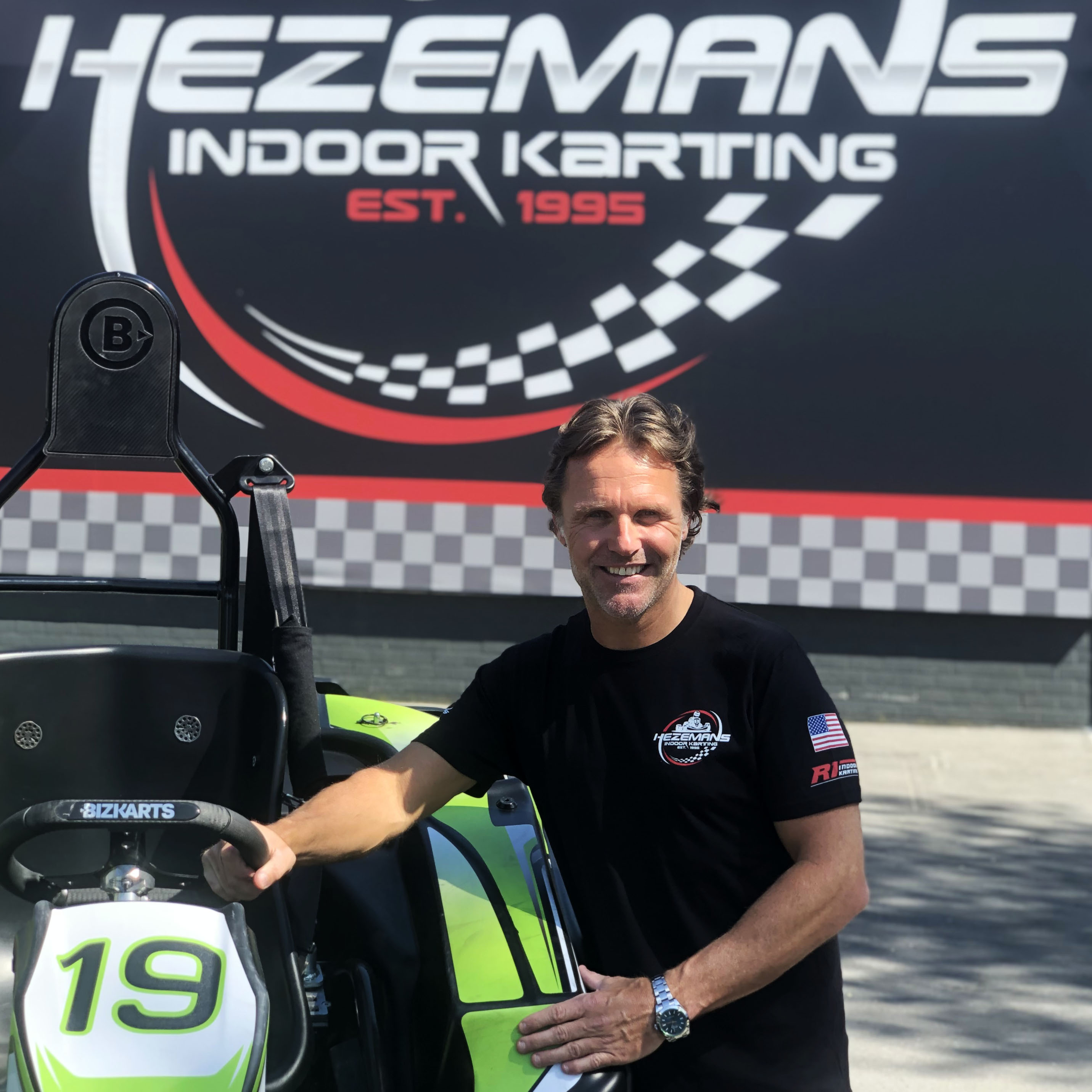
- Hezemans in 2019
- Nationality: (Netherlands) Dutch
- Born: 25 July 1969 (age 57) Eindhoven, Netherlands
- Relatives: Toine Hezemans (father); Loris Hezemans (brother); Liam Hezemans (brother)
- Categorisation: FIA Gold (until 2019); FIA Silver (2023–)

Mike Hezemans (born 25 July 1969) is a Dutch racing driver who last competed for Marc VDS Racing Team in the Blancpain Endurance Series.

Hezemans is a two-time winner of the Spa 24 Hours, a three-time winner of the 24 Hours of Zolder and a race winner in the FIA GT Championship, in which he was runner-up in points four times.

== Career ==
Hezemans began karting in 1981, most notably finishing third in the Karting World Championship and runner-up in the Karting European Championship in 1989 before stepping up to car-racing the year after by racing in the Dutch Production Car Championship.

After spending four years between Porsche Carrera Cup Germany and Porsche Supercup, which included a podium at the 1991 24 Hours of Spa, Hezemans joined Lotus Racing Team for the 1996 BPR Global GT Series. Continuing with Lotus Racing for 1997, Hezemans competed in the FIA GT Championship and the 24 Hours of Le Mans in the GT1 class.

In 1998, Hezemans returned to the GT1 class of the FIA GT Championship for a part-time schedule with Team Hezemans, before switching to the GT2 class and Roock Racing for the second half, during which he scored a podium in the season-ending race at Laguna Seca.

Following his third season in the FIA GT Championship in 1999 where he only scored four points, Hezemans joined his father Toine's Carsport Holland team for the following year. After taking his maiden series win at Monza, Hezemans won again at the A1-Ring and Brno to end the season runner-up in points.

Hezemans remained with Carsport Holland for 2001, this time partnering Jeroen Bleekemolen. The pair won at the Hungaroring and Estoril on their way to runner-up honors in the GT standings. Partnering up with Anthony Kumpen for 2002, the pair won the second-to-last race at Donington Park as they finished sixth in points. During 2002, Hezemans took the first of three consecutive 24 Hours of Zolder wins.

After podium-less stints with Force One Racing Festina and GPC Giesse Squadra Corse, Hezemans returned to GLPK-Carsport for 2005 alongside Bert Longin and Anthony Kumpen. The trio won at Imola and the third-to-last round at Zhuhai en route to a sixth place in points at season's end. The trio was retained by GLPK-Carsport for 2006, but were only able to muster a win at Le Castellet and four more podiums to finish the season seventh in the GT1 standings.

Staying with Carsport Holland for 2007, Hezemans was partnered by Jean-Denis Délétraz while also being joined by Marcel Fässler and Fabrizio Gollin for the Spa 24 Hours, which they won, helping them to finish third in the GT1 points. Gollin then became Hezemans' full-time teammate for the 2008 season as Carsport Holland strengthened their partnership with Phoenix Racing. The duo scored a lone win in Adria and ended the season runner-up in points.

Hezemans initially signed with Racing Box to race in the 24 Hours of Le Mans for 2009, but after said deal broke down, Hezemans returned to the FIA GT Championship, joining PekaRacing nv alongside Anthony Kumpen. The duo took their first win of the season in Oschersleben, before winning the 24 Hours of Spa on their way to runner-up in the GT1 points.

Staying in the newly-rebranded FIA GT1 World Championship for 2010, Hezemans joined Phoenix Racing / Carsport. Splitting the season with Mad-Croc Racing, Hezemans scored only one podium during the season, a third at the 24 Hours of Spa.

Hezemans remained in the FIA GT1 World Championship, joining Exim Bank Team China alongside Nicky Catsburg. After taking his first podium at Zolder, Hezemans took pole at Silverstone, before finishing third in both races. During 2011, Hezemans made a one-off appearance in the Blancpain Endurance Series for KRK Racing Team Holland.

In 2012, Hezemans returned to the Blancpain Endurance Series, joining Marc VDS Racing Team alongside Bert Longin and Henri Moser. After scoring his season-best result of sixth at Le Castellet, Hezemans left the team before the season-ending round in Navarra and was replaced by Nicky Catsburg.

== Personal life ==
Hezemans is the son of 1970 European Touring Car Championship champion Toine Hezemans, and is the brother of NASCAR Whelen Euro Series drivers Loris and Liam Hezemans.

Hezemans is the co-owner of Norwyn Development Group, and lives in Miami, Florida.

== Karting record ==
=== Karting career summary ===
Season	Series	Team	Position
1989	FIA European Championship - Formula A		2nd
1989	CIK-FIA World Championship - Formula A		3rd
1990	FIA Karting World Championship - Formula C		32nd
2001	Wouter van Eeuwijk Trophy		10th
2002	Wouter van Eeuwijk Trophy		11th

== Racing record ==
=== Racing career summary ===
Season	Series	Team	Races	Wins	Poles	F/Laps	Podiums	Points	Position
1990	Dutch Production Car Championship - 5000cc		??	??	??	??	??	51	7th
1991	Porsche Carrera Cup Germany		??	??	??	??	??	6	??
1991	Spa 24 Hours	Team Hezemans Rotax	1	0	0	0	1	N/A	**3rd**
1992	Porsche Carrera Cup Germany		??	??	??	??	??	26	16th
1992	Spa 24 Hours	Team Hezemans Rotax	1	0	0	0	0	N/A	DNF
1993	Porsche Carrera Cup Germany	Roock Racing	??	1	0	0	4	104	5th
1993	Porsche Supercup	Roock Racing	9	0	1	0	1	73	6th
1993	ADAC GT Cup – Class 1	Roock Racing	1	0	1	0	1	12	12th
1994	Porsche Supercup	Roock Racing	??	0	0	0	0	67	9th
1994	ADAC GT Cup – Class 1	Roock Racing	1	0	0	1	1	12	11th
1996	BPR Global GT Series – GT1	Freisinger Motorsport	1	0	0	0	0	23	62nd
1996	BPR Global GT Series – GT1	Lotus Racing Team	10	0	0	0	0	23	62nd
1997	FIA GT Championship – GT1	GT1 Lotus Racing Franck Muller	11	0	0	0	0	0	NC
1997	24 Hours of Le Mans – LMGT1	GT1 Lotus Racing Franck Muller	1	0	0	0	0	N/A	DNF
1998	FIA GT Championship – GT1	Team Hezemans	1	0	0	0	0	0	NC
1998	FIA GT Championship – GT2	Roock Racing	5	0	0	0	1	6	20th
1999	FIA GT Championship – GT1	Marcos Racing International	1	0	0	0	0	4	23rd
1999	FIA GT Championship – GT1	Konrad Motorsport	3	0	0	0	0	4	23rd
1999	FIA GT Championship – GT1	Lister Storm Racing	2	0	0	0	1	4	23rd
1999	FIA GT Championship – GT1	Paul Belmondo Racing	2	0	0	0	0	4	23rd
1999	American Le Mans Series – GTS	Konrad Motorsport	1	0	0	0	1	0	NC
2000	FIA GT Championship – GT	Carsport Holland	10	3	3	1	5	50.5	**2nd**
2000	American Le Mans Series – GTS	Carsport Holland	1	0	0	0	0	0	NC
2001	FIA GT Championship – GT	Carsport Holland	10	2	3	3	6	42	**2nd**
2001	American Le Mans Series – GTS	American Viperacing	1	0	0	0	1	24	17th
2002	FIA GT Championship – GT	Carsport Holland	10	1	0	0	5	36	6th
2002	24 Hours of Le Mans – LMGTS	Carsport Holland	1	0	0	0	0	N/A	DNF
2002	American Le Mans Series – GTS	Carsport Holland	1	0	0	0	0	36	20th
2002	American Le Mans Series – GTS	American Viperacing	1	0	0	0	0	36	20th
2002	Belcar		??	??	??	??	??	257	7th
2003	FIA GT Championship – GT	Force One Racing Festina	10	0	1	0	0	0	NC
2003	American Le Mans Series – GTS	Carsport America	1	0	0	0	0	0	NC
2003	24 Hours of Le Mans – LMGTS	Carsport America	1	0	0	0	0	N/A	DNF
2004	FIA GT Championship – GT	GPC Giesse Squadra Corse	5	0	0	0	0	9	24th
2004	Le Mans Endurance Series – GTS	Barron Connor Racing	4	0	0	0	2	14	7th
2004	American Le Mans Series – GTS	Barron Connor Racing	1	0	0	0	0	0	NC
2004	24 Hours of Le Mans – LMGTS	Barron Connor Racing	1	0	0	0	0	N/A	DNF
2005	FIA GT Championship – GT1	GLPK-Carsport	11	2	1	2	5	52	6th
2006	FIA GT Championship – GT1	GLPK-Carsport	10	1	1	0	5	48	7th
2006	Mil Milhas Brasil – GTP1	GLPK-Carsport	1	0	0	0	0	N/A	5th
2006	Le Mans Series – GT2	Spyker Squadron	4	0	0	0	1	10	10th
2006	24 Hours of Le Mans – GT2	Spyker Squadron	1	0	0	0	0	N/A	DNF
2006	American Le Mans Series – GT2	Spyker Squadron	1	0	0	0	0	9	42nd
2007	FIA GT Championship – GT1	Carsport Holland	10	2	0	0	4	55	**3rd**
2007	Le Mans Series – GT2	Spyker Squadron	2	0	0	0	1	11	17th
2007	24 Hours of Le Mans – GT2	Spyker Squadron	1	0	0	0	0	N/A	DNF
2008	FIA GT Championship – GT1	Phoenix Carsport Racing	11	1	0	1	6	66	**2nd**
2008	ADAC GT Masters	Reiter Engineering	2	0	0	0	0	0	NC
2008	24 Hours of Le Mans – GT1	IPB Spartak Racing / Reiter Engineering	1	0	0	0	0	N/A	DNF
2009	FIA GT Championship – GT1	PekaRacing nv	8	2	0	0	5	53	**2nd**
2010	Dutch Winter Endurance Series	Team Master-Care	1	0	0	1	0	10	99th
2010	FIA GT1 World Championship	Phoenix Racing / Carsport	6	0	0	0	1	23	29th
2010	FIA GT1 World Championship	Mad-Croc Racing	4	0	0	0	0	23	29th
2011	FIA GT1 World Championship	Exim Bank Team China	14	0	1	1	3	46	14th
2011	ADAC GT Masters	Callaway Competition	2	0	0	0	0	0	NC
2011	Belcar – GT3	Merc-Hezemans	1	0	0	0	0	3	20th
2011	Belcar Endurance Championship	Merc-Hezemans	1	0	0	0	0	10	41st
2011	Blancpain Endurance Series – Pro	KRK Racing Team Holland	1	0	0	0	0	6	30th
2012	Blancpain Endurance Series – Pro	Marc VDS Racing Team	5	0	0	0	0	30	14th

=== Complete FIA GT Championship results ===
(key) (Races in bold indicate pole position) (Races in italics indicate fastest lap)

Year	Team	Car	Class	1	2	3	4	5	6	7	8	9	10	11	12	13	Pos.	Pts
1997	GT1 Lotus Racing	Lotus Elise GT1	GT1	HOC; Ret	SIL; Ret	HEL	NÜR; 11	SPA; Ret	A1R; Ret	SUZ	DON; 17	MUG; 11	SEB; 11	LAG; 9			NC	0
1998	Team Hezemans	Bitter GT1	GT1	OSC; WD	SIL; Ret	HOC; DNS	DIJ	HUN									NC	0
1998	Roock Racing	Porsche 911 GT2	GT2						SUZ; 7	DON; 12	A1R; 9	HOM; 12	LAG; 2				20th	6
1999	Marcos Racing International	Marcos LM600	GT	MNZ; 13					OSC; DNS								23rd	4
1999	Konrad Motorsport	Porsche 911 GT2	GT		SIL; 13						HOM; Ret	GLN; 11	ZHU				23rd	4
1999	Lister Storm Racing	Lister Storm GT2	GT			HOC; Ret		ZOL; 3									23rd	4
1999	Paul Belmondo Racing	Chrysler Viper GTS-R	GT				HUN; 9			DON; Ret							23rd	4
2000	Carsport Holland	Chrysler Viper GTS-R	GT	VAL; 4	EST; 4	MNZ; 1	SIL; 2	HUN; 6	ZOL; Ret	A1R; 1	LAU; 4	BRN; 1	MAG; 2				2nd	50.5
2001	Team Carsport Holland	Chrysler Viper GTS-R	GT	MNZ; DNS	BRN; 3	MAG; Ret	SIL; Ret	ZOL; 2	HUN; 1	SPA; 6H ?	SPA; 12H ?	SPA; 24H; Ret	A1R; 2	NÜR; 2	JAR; Ret	EST; 1	2nd	42
2002	Team Carsport Holland	Chrysler Viper GTS-R	GT	MAG; 2	SIL; Ret	BRN; 9	JAR; 2	AND; 3	OSC; 9	SPA; 6H ?	SPA; 12H ?	SPA; 24H; Ret	PER; 6	DON; 1	EST; 2		6th	36
2003	Force One Racing Festina	Chrysler Viper GTS-R	GT	CAT; Ret	MAG; Ret	PER; Ret	BRN; Ret	DON; Ret	SPA; 6H ?	SPA; 12H ?	SPA; 24H; Ret	AND; Ret	OSC; Ret	EST; Ret	MNZ; Ret		NC	0
2004	GPC Giesse Squadra Corse	Ferrari 575 GTC	GT	MNZ; 4	VAL; Ret	MAG; 13	HOC; 5	BRN; Ret	DON	SPA; 6H	SPA; 12H	SPA; 24H	A1R	OSC	DUB	ZHU	24th	9
2005	GLPK-Carsport	Chevrolet Corvette C5-R	GT1	MNZ; 10	MAG; 4	SIL; Ret	IMO; 1	BRN; 4	SPA; 6H; DSQ	SPA; 12H; DSQ	SPA; 24H; DSQ	OSC; 3	IST; 5	ZHU; 1	DUB; 3	BHR; 3	6th	52
2006	GLPK-Carsport	Chevrolet Corvette C6.R	GT1	SIL; 8	BRN; 8	OSC; Ret	SPA; 6H; 3	SPA; 12H; 3	SPA; 24H; 3	LEC; 1	DIJ; Ret	MUG; 7	HUN; 2	ADR; 3	DUB; 2		7th	48
2007	Carsport Holland	Chevrolet Corvette C6.R	GT1	ZHU; 5	**SIL**; 2	BUC; Ret	MNZ; 3	OSC; Ret	**SPA**; **6H**; 3	**SPA**; **12H**; 1	**SPA**; **24H**; 1	ADR; 5	BRN; 9	NOG; 1	ZOL; 4		3rd	55
2008	Carsport Holland	Chevrolet Corvette C6.R	GT1	SIL; 5	MNZ; 4	ADR; 1	OSC; 6	SPA; 6H; 4	SPA; 12H; 5	SPA; 24H; Ret	BUC; 1; 2	BUC; 2 Ret	BRN; 2	NOG; 2	ZOL; 2	SAN; 2	2nd	66
2009	PekaRacing nv	Corvette C6.R	GT1	SIL; 4	ADR; 2	OSC; 1	SPA; 6H ?	SPA; 12H ?	SPA; 24H; 1	BUD; 5	ALG; 2	LEC; Ret	ZOL; 2				2nd	53

=== Complete 24 Hours of Le Mans results ===
Year	Team	Co-Drivers	Car	Class	Laps	Pos.	Class Pos.
1997	(United Kingdom) GT1 Lotus Racing	(Netherlands) Jan Lammers (Germany) Alexander Grau	Lotus Elise GT1	GT1	121	DNF	DNF
2002	(Netherlands) Team Carsport Holland (Italy) Racing Box	(Belgium) Anthony Kumpen (Italy) Gabriele Matteuzzi	Chrysler Viper GTS-R	GTS	93	DNF	DNF
2003	(United States) Carsport America	(Belgium) Anthony Kumpen (Netherlands) David Hart	Pagani Zonda GR	GTS	10	DNF	DNF
2004	(Netherlands) Barron Connor Racing	(Switzerland) Jean-Denis Delétraz (France) Ange Barde	Ferrari 575-GTC	GTS	200	DNF	DNF
2006	(Netherlands) Spyker Squadron b.v.	(Netherlands) Jeroen Bleekemolen (United Kingdom) Jonny Kane	Spyker C8 Spyder GT2-R	GT2	202	DNF	DNF
2007	(Netherlands) Spyker Squadron	(Czech Republic) Jaroslav Janiš (United Kingdom) Jonny Kane	Spyker C8 Spyder GT2-R	GT2	70	DNF	DNF
2008	(Russia) IPB Spartak Racing (Germany) Reiter Engineering	(Netherlands) Peter Kox (Russia) Roman Rusinov	Lamborghini Murciélago R-GT	GT1	266	NC	NC

=== Complete European Le Mans Series results ===
(key) (Races in bold indicate pole position; results in italics indicate fastest lap)

Year	Entrant	Class	Chassis	Engine	1	2	3	4	5	6	Rank	Points
2004	Barron Connor Racing	GTS	Ferrari 575-GTC Maranello	Ferrari 6.0L V12	MNZ; Ret	NUR; 5	SIL; 2	SPA; 3			7th	14
2006	Spyker Squadron	GT2	Spyker C8 Spyder GT2-R	Audi 3.8L V8	IST; 5	SPA; 10	NUR; 3	DON	JAR; Ret		10th	10
2007	Spyker Squadron	GT2	Spyker C8 Spyder GT2-R	Audi 3.8L V8	MNZ	VAL	NUR	SPA	SIL; 3	MIL; 4	11th	11

=== Complete FIA GT1 World Championship results ===
(key) (Races in bold indicate pole position) (Races in italics indicate fastest lap)

Year	Team	Car	1	2	3	4	5	6	7	8	9	10	11	12	13	14	15	16	17	18	19	20	Pos	Points
2010	Triple H Team Hegersport	Chevrolet Corvette C6.R	ABU; QR; 16	ABU; CR; 3	SIL; QR; 7	SIL; CR; Ret					SPA; QR; DSQ	SPA; CR; 13	NÜR; QR	NÜR; CR	ALG; QR	ALG; CR	NAV; QR	NAV; CR	INT; QR	INT; CR	SAN; QR	SAN; CR	29th	23
2010	Mad-Croc Racing	Chevrolet Corvette C6.R					BRN; QR; 5	BRN; CR; 15	LEC; QR; 4	LEC; CR; 6													29th	23
2011	Exim Bank Team China	Chevrolet Corvette C6.R	ABU; QR; 7	ABU; CR; 10	ZOL; QR; 2	ZOL; CR; 5	ALG; QR; 9	ALG; CR; 9	SAC; QR; Ret	SAC; CR; 6	SIL; QR; 3	SIL; CR; 3	NAV; QR; Ret	NAV; CR; Ret	LEC; QR; Ret	LEC; CR; Ret	ORD; QR	ORD; CR	BEI; QR	BEI; CR	SAN; QR	SAN; CR	14th	46

=== Complete GT World Challenge Europe results ===
==== GT World Challenge Europe Endurance Cup ====
(key) (Races in bold indicate pole position) (Races in italics indicate fastest lap)

Year	Team	Car	Class	1	2	3	4	5	6	7	8	Pos.	Points
2011	KRK Racing Team Holland	Mercedes-Benz SLS AMG GT3	GT3 Pro	MNZ	NAV	SPA; 6H ??	SPA; 12H ??	SPA; 24H; Ret	MAG	SIL		30th	6
2012	Marc VDS Racing Team	BMW Z4 GT3	Pro	MNZ; 11	SIL; Ret	LEC; 6	SPA; 6H ??	SPA; 12H ??	SPA; 24H; 15	NÜR; 8	NAV	14th	30
