= Prospeed Competition =

Belgian sports car race team

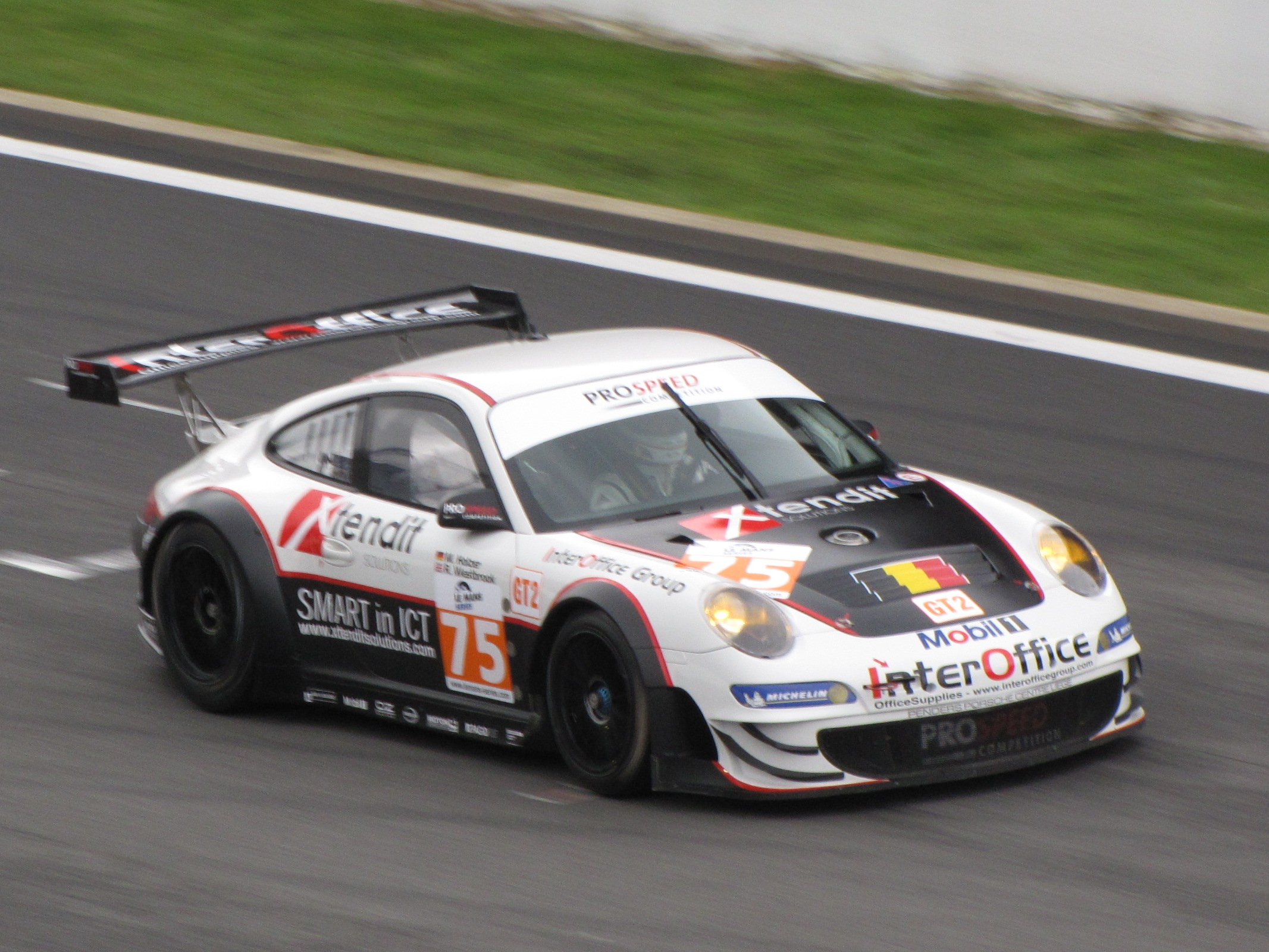
Prospeeed Porsche 997 GT3 RSR at the 2010 1000 km Spa-Francorchamps

Prospeed Competition is a sports car racing team based in Liège, Belgium. It was founded in 2006 by Rudi Penders and Luc Goris. It has been a factory-supported Porsche team since 2008.

The team debuted in the 2006 Belcar Endurance Championship, where it won the 2011 and 2012 drivers championships and the 2009 24 Hours of Zolder.

In 2008, the team entered the FIA GT Championship with a GT2 class Porsche 911 driven by Richard Westbrook and Emmanuel Collard and another for Markus Palttala and Mikael Forsten. The team finished third in the teams standings and Westbrook took third place in the drivers standings. Prospeed claiming the 2009 GT2 drivers title with Richard Westbrook but finished second in the teams standings with Marco Holzer and Paul van Splunteren.

In 2010, after the dismissal of the GT2 class of the FIA GT Championship, the team moved to the Le Mans Series with a GT2-class Porsche 911 run by Westbrook and Holzer. The best result was a second place at Silverstone and ended 12th in the teams championship. The team also fielded an all-amateur car at the 24 Hours of Le Mans.

Westbrook was replaced by Marc Goossens in the 2011 Le Mans Series. The duo finished 13th in the GT2 drivers championship and Prospeed finished sixth in the GT2 teams championship. They also finished 8th in the GTE-Pro class at the 24 Hours of Le Mans, with Jaap van Lagen as third driver. The team won the GTE-Am class of the 2012 6 Hours of Castellet, but did not compete at the remaining European Le Mans Series races. Later they raced at the 24 Hours of Le Mans with a GTE-Am entry headed by Sean Edwards, which retired at mid race.

Prospeed also competed at the FIA GT3 European Championship, where it won the 2010 teams title and finished vice-champion in the drivers title with Marco Holzer and Paul van Splunteren. They also fielded two cars in 2011, when the best lineup finished 19th in the standings with two wins.

Prospeed returned to the 2011 24 Hours of Spa also with two Porsche 911 cars: a Pro entry headlined by Goossens and a Pro-Am, both of which retired. The team joined the full Blancpain Endurance Series for 2012 with a Pro car for Goosens, Xavier Maassen and Marc Hennerici, and a Pro-Am car. The Pro car won a race and finished third in the teams championship, whereas the drivers ended 7th behind the two leading WRT and Marc VDS driver lineups.

== 24 Hours of Le Mans results ==
Year	Entrant	No.	Car	Drivers	Class	Laps	Pos.	Class Pos.
2010	(Belgium) Prospeed Competition	75	Porsche 997 GT3-RSR	(Netherlands) Niek Hommerson (Belgium) Louis Machiels (Netherlands) Paul van Splunteren	LMGT2	317	21st	7th
2011	(Belgium) Prospeed Competition	75	Porsche 997 GT3-RSR	(Belgium) Marc Goossens (Germany) Marco Holzer (Netherlands) Jaap van Lagen	LMGTE Pro	293	23rd	8th
2012	(Belgium) Prospeed Competition	75	Porsche 997 GT3-RSR	(Saudi Arabia) Abdulaziz Al-Faisal (United States) Bret Curtis (United Kingdom) Sean Edwards	LMGTE Am	180	DNF	DNF
2013	(Belgium) Prospeed Competition	75	Porsche 997 GT3-RSR	(France) Emmanuel Collard (France) Sébastien Crubilé (France) François Perrodo	LMGTE Am	298	36th	9th
2014	(Belgium) Prospeed Competition	79	Porsche 997 GT3-RSR	(Netherlands) Jeroen Bleekemolen (United States) ~~Bret Curtis~~ (Note: Bret Curtis was originally scheduled to drive the No. 79 Prospeed Porsche, but sustained a concussion after an accident during qualifying and was not cleared for the race. The team nominated Sébastien Crubilé as a replacement, but the ACO did not allow him to participate due to a lack of laps driven at night. Prospeed opted to continue with only two drivers, but were forced to switch to the LMGTE Pro category due to no longer meeting the LMGTE Am driver ranking requirements.) (United States) Cooper MacNeil	LMGTE Pro	319	33rd	5th
2014	(Belgium) Prospeed Competition	75	Porsche 997 GT3-RSR	(France) Emmanuel Collard (Finland) Markus Palttala (France) François Perrodo	LMGTE Am	194	DNF	DNF
2015	(Taiwan) Team AAI	67	Porsche 997 GT3-RSR	(Taiwan) Jun-San Chen (United Kingdom) Alex Kapadia (Netherlands) Xavier Maassen	LMGTE Am	316	37th	8th
2015	(Taiwan) Team AAI	68	Porsche 911 RSR	(Taiwan) Han-Chen Chen (France) Mike Parisy (France) Gilles Vannelet	LMGTE Am	320	35th	6th
2016	(Taiwan) Team AAI	57	Chevrolet Corvette C7.R	(United Kingdom) Oliver Bryant (United States) Johnny O'Connell (United States) Mark Patterson	LMGTE Am	306	39th	9th
