= 2009 FIA GT Adria 2 Hours =

Layout of the Adria International Raceway

The 2009 FIA GT Adria 2 Hours is the second round of the 2009 FIA GT Championship season. It took place at the Adria International Raceway, Italy, on 16 May 2009.

== Report ==
=== Qualifying ===
The #14 K plus K Motorsports Saleen initially qualified on pole position, but was disqualified for failing technical inspection. The #77 BMS Scuderia Italia Ferrari was also disqualified.

==== Qualifying result ====
Class winners are highlighted in bold.

Pos	Class	Team	Qualifying Driver	Lap Time
1	**GT1**	**#1 Vitaphone Racing Team**	**Andrea Bertolini**	**1:12.086**
2	GT1	#2 Vitaphone Racing Team	Alex Müller	1:12.088
3	GT1	#19 Luc Alphand Aventures	Xavier Maassen	1:12.479
4	GT1	#4 PK Carsport	Anthony Kumpen	1:12.498
5	GT1	#3 Selleslagh Racing Team	James Ruffier	1:13.035
6	GT1	#13 Full Speed Racing Team	Ferdinando Monfardini	1:13.390
7	GT1	#40 Marc VDS Racing Team	Bas Leinders	1:13.558
8	GT1	#44 Matech GT Racing	Thomas Biagi	1:13.952
9	GT1	#11 Full Speed Racing Team	Stéphane Lémeret	1:14.252
10	**GT2**	**#97 Brixia Racing**	**Martin Ragginger**	**1:15.177**
11	GT2	#50 AF Corse	Gianmaria Bruni	1:15.198
12	GT2	#51 AF Corse	Niki Cadei	1:15.416
13	GT2	#61 Prospeed Competition	Marco Holzer	1:15.434
14	GT2	#60 Prospeed Competition	Richard Westbrook	1:15.449
15	GT2	#59 Trackspeed Racing	Tim Sugden	1:15.485
16	GT2	#55 CRS Racing	Tim Mullen	1:15.547
17	GT2	#56 CRS Racing	Rob Bell	1:15.951
18	GT2	#78 BMS Scuderia Italia	Diego Romanini	1:16.969
19	GT2	#95 PeCom Racing	Cédric Sbirrazuoli	1:18.960
20	GT1	#18 K plus K Motorsport		No Time
DSQ	GT1	#14 K plus K Motorsport	Karl Wendlinger	Disallowed
DSQ	GT2	#77 BMS Scuderia Italia	Paolo Ruberti	Disallowed

=== Race ===
==== Race result ====
Class winners in bold. Cars failing to complete 75% of winner's distance marked as Not Classified (NC).

Pos	Class	No	Team	Drivers	Chassis	Tyre	Laps
Pos	Class	No	Team	Drivers	Engine	Tyre	Laps
1	**GT1**	**1**	**(Germany) Vitaphone Racing Team**	**(Germany) Michael Bartels (Italy) Andrea Bertolini**	**Maserati MC12 GT1**	MI	**96**
1	**GT1**	**1**	**(Germany) Vitaphone Racing Team**	**(Germany) Michael Bartels (Italy) Andrea Bertolini**	Maserati 6.0 L V12	MI	**96**
2	GT1	4	(Belgium) PK Carsport	(Netherlands) Mike Hezemans (Belgium) Anthony Kumpen	Chevrolet Corvette C6.R	MI	96
2	GT1	4	(Belgium) PK Carsport	(Netherlands) Mike Hezemans (Belgium) Anthony Kumpen	Chevrolet LS7.R 7.0 L V8	MI	96
3	GT1	2	(Germany) Vitaphone Racing Team	(Portugal) Miguel Ramos (Germany) Alex Müller	Maserati MC12 GT1	MI	96
3	GT1	2	(Germany) Vitaphone Racing Team	(Portugal) Miguel Ramos (Germany) Alex Müller	Maserati 6.0 L V12	MI	96
4	GT1	19	(France) Luc Alphand Aventures	(France) Guillaume Moreau (Netherlands) Xavier Maassen	Chevrolet Corvette C6.R	MI	95
4	GT1	19	(France) Luc Alphand Aventures	(France) Guillaume Moreau (Netherlands) Xavier Maassen	Chevrolet LS7.R 7.0 L V8	MI	95
5	GT1	3	(Belgium) Selleslagh Racing Team	(Belgium) Bert Longin (France) James Ruffier	Chevrolet Corvette C6.R	MI	95
5	GT1	3	(Belgium) Selleslagh Racing Team	(Belgium) Bert Longin (France) James Ruffier	Chevrolet LS7.R 7.0 L V8	MI	95
6	GT1	11	(Austria) Full Speed Racing Team	(United Kingdom) Luke Hines (Belgium) Stéphane Lémeret	Saleen S7-R	P	92
6	GT1	11	(Austria) Full Speed Racing Team	(United Kingdom) Luke Hines (Belgium) Stéphane Lémeret	Ford 7.0 L V8	P	92
7	**GT2**	**60**	**(Belgium) Prospeed Competition**	**(France) Emmanuel Collard (United Kingdom) Richard Westbrook**	**Porsche 997 GT3-RSR**	MI	**92**
7	**GT2**	**60**	**(Belgium) Prospeed Competition**	**(France) Emmanuel Collard (United Kingdom) Richard Westbrook**	**Porsche 4.0 L Flat-6**	MI	**92**
8	GT2	50	(Italy) AF Corse	(Finland) Toni Vilander (Italy) Gianmaria Bruni	Ferrari F430 GT2	MI	92
8	GT2	50	(Italy) AF Corse	(Finland) Toni Vilander (Italy) Gianmaria Bruni	Ferrari 4.0 L V8	MI	92
9	GT2	51	(Italy) AF Corse	(Spain) Álvaro Barba (Italy) Niki Cadei	Ferrari F430 GT2	MI	92
9	GT2	51	(Italy) AF Corse	(Spain) Álvaro Barba (Italy) Niki Cadei	Ferrari 4.0 L V8	MI	92
10	GT2	61	(Belgium) Prospeed Competition	(Hong Kong) Darryl O'Young (Germany) Marco Holzer	Porsche 997 GT3-RSR	MI	92
10	GT2	61	(Belgium) Prospeed Competition	(Hong Kong) Darryl O'Young (Germany) Marco Holzer	Porsche 4.0 L Flat-6	MI	92
11	GT2	97	(Italy) Brixia Racing	(Austria) Martin Ragginger (Italy) Luigi Lucchini	Porsche 997 GT3-RSR	MI	92
11	GT2	97	(Italy) Brixia Racing	(Austria) Martin Ragginger (Italy) Luigi Lucchini	Porsche 4.0 L Flat-6	MI	92
12	GT1	40	(Belgium) Marc VDS Racing Team	(Belgium) Renaud Kuppens (Belgium) Bas Leinders	Ford GT1	MI	92
12	GT1	40	(Belgium) Marc VDS Racing Team	(Belgium) Renaud Kuppens (Belgium) Bas Leinders	Ford 5.0 L V8	MI	92
13	GT2	55	(United Kingdom) CRS Racing	(Canada) Chris Niarchos (United Kingdom) Tim Mullen	Ferrari F430 GT2	MI	91
13	GT2	55	(United Kingdom) CRS Racing	(Canada) Chris Niarchos (United Kingdom) Tim Mullen	Ferrari 4.0 L V8	MI	91
14	GT2	56	(United Kingdom) CRS Racing	(United Kingdom) Rob Bell (United Kingdom) Andrew Kirkaldy	Ferrari F430 GT2	MI	91
14	GT2	56	(United Kingdom) CRS Racing	(United Kingdom) Rob Bell (United Kingdom) Andrew Kirkaldy	Ferrari 4.0 L V8	MI	91
15	GT2	59	(United Kingdom) Trackspeed Racing	(United Kingdom) David Ashburn (United Kingdom) Tim Sugden	Porsche 997 GT3-RSR	MI	90
15	GT2	59	(United Kingdom) Trackspeed Racing	(United Kingdom) David Ashburn (United Kingdom) Tim Sugden	Porsche 4.0 L Flat-6	MI	90
16	GT2	78	(Italy) BMS Scuderia Italia	(Germany) Kenneth Heyer (Italy) Diego Romanini	Ferrari F430 GT2	MI	90
16	GT2	78	(Italy) BMS Scuderia Italia	(Germany) Kenneth Heyer (Italy) Diego Romanini	Ferrari 4.0 L V8	MI	90
17	GT1	18	(Czech Republic) K Plus K Motorsport	(Mexico) Mario Domínguez (Czech Republic) Adam Lacko	Saleen S7-R	MI	85
17	GT1	18	(Czech Republic) K Plus K Motorsport	(Mexico) Mario Domínguez (Czech Republic) Adam Lacko	Ford 7.0 L V8	MI	85
18	GT2	77	(Italy) BMS Scuderia Italia	(Italy) Paolo Ruberti (Italy) Matteo Malucelli	Ferrari F430 GT2	MI	83
18	GT2	77	(Italy) BMS Scuderia Italia	(Italy) Paolo Ruberti (Italy) Matteo Malucelli	Ferrari 4.0 L V8	MI	83
19	GT1	44	(Switzerland) Matech GT Racing	(Germany) Thomas Mutsch (Italy) Thomas Biagi	Ford GT1	MI	71
19	GT1	44	(Switzerland) Matech GT Racing	(Germany) Thomas Mutsch (Italy) Thomas Biagi	Ford 5.0 L V8	MI	71
20 DNF	GT1	13	(Austria) Full Speed Racing Team	(France) Michael Orts (Italy) Ferdinando Monfardini	Saleen S7-R	P	20
20 DNF	GT1	13	(Austria) Full Speed Racing Team	(France) Michael Orts (Italy) Ferdinando Monfardini	Ford 7.0 L V8	P	20
21 DNF	GT2	95	(Argentina) PeCom Racing	(France) Cédric Sbirrazuoli (Italy) Francesco La Mazza	Ferrari F430 GT2	MI	6
21 DNF	GT2	95	(Argentina) PeCom Racing	(France) Cédric Sbirrazuoli (Italy) Francesco La Mazza	Ferrari 4.0 L V8	MI	6
22 DNF	GT1	14	(Czech Republic) K Plus K Motorsport	(Austria) Karl Wendlinger (United Kingdom) Ryan Sharp	Saleen S7-R	MI	0
22 DNF	GT1	14	(Czech Republic) K Plus K Motorsport	(Austria) Karl Wendlinger (United Kingdom) Ryan Sharp	Ford 7.0 L V8	MI	0

FIA GT Championship
Previous race: FIA GT Tourist Trophy	2009 season	Next race: FIA GT Oschersleben 2 Hours
