= 2009 FIA GT Zolder 2 Hours =

Layout of the Circuit Zolder

The 2009 FIA GT Zolder 2 Hours is the eighth and final round of the 2009 FIA GT Championship season. It took place at Zolder, Belgium on 25 October 2009. It was also the final round held under the FIA GT Championship banner before the introduction of the FIA GT1 World Championship and FIA GT2 European Championship in 2010.

The race was won by the No. 33 Vitaphone Racing Team DHL Maserati of the Italians Alessandro Pier Guidi and Matteo Bobbi, leading the No. 4 Peka Racing Corvette and No. 1 Vitaphone Maserati. Michael Bartels and Andrea Bertolini secured the GT1 Drivers' Championship with their third-place finish. Richard Westbrook and Marco Holzer won the GT2 category in the No. 60 Prospeed Competition Porsche, with Westbrook securing the GT2 Drivers' Championship.

== Report ==
=== Qualifying ===
Anthony Kumpen qualified the No. 4 Peka Racing Corvette on pole position ahead of the No. 1 Vitaphone Maserati. However the two cars on the front row were penalized for setting their fastest lap while a portion of the track was under yellow flag conditions. Both were moved back five grid spots, promoting the No. 33 Vitaphone Maserati to pole at the race start.

==== Qualifying results ====
Pole position winners in each class are marked in bold.

| Pos | Class | Team | Driver | Lap Time | Grid |
|---|---|---|---|---|---|
| 1 | GT1 | No. 4 Peka Racing | Anthony Kumpen | 1:27.399 | 6 |
| 2 | GT1 | No. 2 Vitaphone Racing Team | Alex Müller | 1:27.464 | 7 |
| 3 | **GT1** | **No. 33 Vitaphone Racing Team DHL** | **Alessandro Pier Guidi** | **1:27.589** | **1** |
| 4 | GT1 | No. 8 Sangari Team Brazil | Enrique Bernoldi | 1:28.026 | 2 |
| 5 | GT1 | No. 19 Luc Alphand Aventures | Xavier Maassen | 1:28.148 | 3 |
| 6 | GT1 | No. 1 Vitaphone Racing Team | Andrea Bertolini | 1:28.183 | 4 |
| 7 | GT1 | No. 3 Selleslagh Racing Team | Bert Longin | 1:28.848 | 5 |
| 8 | GT1 | No. 35 Nissan Motorsports | Michael Krumm | 1:30.754 | 8 |
| 9 | GT1 | No. 40 Marc VDS Racing Team | Bas Leinders | 1:31.274 | 9 |
| 10 | **GT2** | **No. 50 AF Corse** | **Gianmaria Bruni** | **1:31.622** | **10** |
| 11 | GT2 | No. 59 Trackspeed Racing | Jörg Bergmeister | 1:31.381 | 11 |
| 12 | GT2 | No. 60 Prospeed Competition | Richard Westbrook | 1:31.879 | 12 |
| 13 | GT2 | No. 95 PeCom Racing Team | Matías Russo | 1:31.911 | 13 |
| 14 | GT2 | No. 61 Prospeed Competition | Marc Lieb | 1:32.264 | 14 |
| 15 | GT2 | No. 55 CRS Racing | Tim Mullen | 1:32.295 | 15 |
| 16 | GT2 | No. 56 CRS Racing | Rob Bell | 1:32.396 | 16 |
| 17 | GT2 | No. 77 BMS Scuderia Italia | Paolo Ruberti | 1:32.565 | 17 |
| 18 | GT2 | No. 97 Brixia Racing | Martin Ragginger | 1:32.693 | 18 |
| 19 | GT2 | No. 51 AF Corse | Álvaro Barba | 1:32.759 | 19 |
| 20 | GT2 | No. 58 Trackspeed Racing | Sascha Maassen | 1:33.345 | 20 |
| 21 | GT2 | No. 78 BMS Scuderia Italia | Stéphane Lémeret | 1:33.530 | 21 |

=== Race ===
==== Race results ====
Class winners in bold. Cars failing to complete 75% of winner's distance marked as Not Classified (NC).

| Pos | Class | No | Team | Drivers | Chassis | Tyre | Laps |
| Pos | Class | No | Team | Drivers | Engine | Tyre | Laps |
|---|---|---|---|---|---|---|---|
| 1 | **GT1** | **33** | **(Germany) Vitaphone Racing Team DHL** | **(Italy) Alessandro Pier Guidi (Italy) Matteo Bobbi** | **Maserati MC12 GT1** | MI | **79** |
| 1 | **GT1** | **33** | **(Germany) Vitaphone Racing Team DHL** | **(Italy) Alessandro Pier Guidi (Italy) Matteo Bobbi** | **Maserati 6.0 L V12** | MI | **79** |
| 2 | GT1 | 4 | (Belgium) Peka Racing | (Belgium) Anthony Kumpen (Netherlands) Mike Hezemans | Chevrolet Corvette C6.R | MI | 79 |
| 2 | GT1 | 4 | (Belgium) Peka Racing | (Belgium) Anthony Kumpen (Netherlands) Mike Hezemans | Chevrolet LS7.R 7.0 L V8 | MI | 79 |
| 3 | GT1 | 1 | (Germany) Vitaphone Racing Team | (Germany) Michael Bartels (Italy) Andrea Bertolini | Maserati MC12 GT1 | MI | 79 |
| 3 | GT1 | 1 | (Germany) Vitaphone Racing Team | (Germany) Michael Bartels (Italy) Andrea Bertolini | Maserati 6.0 L V12 | MI | 79 |
| 4 | GT1 | 19 | (France) Luc Alphand Aventures | (Netherlands) Xavier Maassen (Italy) Thomas Biagi | Chevrolet Corvette C6.R | MI | 79 |
| 4 | GT1 | 19 | (France) Luc Alphand Aventures | (Netherlands) Xavier Maassen (Italy) Thomas Biagi | Chevrolet LS7.R 7.0 L V8 | MI | 79 |
| 5 | GT1 | 8 | Sangari Team Brazil | (Brazil) Enrique Bernoldi (Brazil) Roberto Streit | Chevrolet Corvette C6.R | MI | 78 |
| 5 | GT1 | 8 | Sangari Team Brazil | (Brazil) Enrique Bernoldi (Brazil) Roberto Streit | Chevrolet LS7.R 7.0 L V8 | MI | 78 |
| 6 | GT1 | 3 | (Belgium) Selleslagh Racing Team | (Belgium) Bert Longin (France) James Ruffier | Chevrolet Corvette C6.R | MI | 78 |
| 6 | GT1 | 3 | (Belgium) Selleslagh Racing Team | (Belgium) Bert Longin (France) James Ruffier | Chevrolet LS7.R 7.0 L V8 | MI | 78 |
| 7 | **GT2** | **60** | **(Belgium) Prospeed Competition** | **(Germany) Marco Holzer (United Kingdom) Richard Westbrook** | **Porsche 997 GT3-RSR** | MI | **76** |
| 7 | **GT2** | **60** | **(Belgium) Prospeed Competition** | **(Germany) Marco Holzer (United Kingdom) Richard Westbrook** | **Porsche 4.0 L Flat-6** | MI | **76** |
| 8 | GT2 | 77 | (Italy) BMS Scuderia Italia | (Italy) Paolo Ruberti (Italy) Matteo Malucelli | Ferrari F430 GT2 | P | 76 |
| 8 | GT2 | 77 | (Italy) BMS Scuderia Italia | (Italy) Paolo Ruberti (Italy) Matteo Malucelli | Ferrari 4.0 L V8 | P | 76 |
| 9 | GT2 | 56 | (United Kingdom) CRS Racing | (United Kingdom) Rob Bell (United Kingdom) Andrew Kirkaldy | Ferrari F430 GT2 | MI | 76 |
| 9 | GT2 | 56 | (United Kingdom) CRS Racing | (United Kingdom) Rob Bell (United Kingdom) Andrew Kirkaldy | Ferrari 4.0 L V8 | MI | 76 |
| 10 | GT2 | 50 | (Italy) AF Corse | (Italy) Gianmaria Bruni (Finland) Toni Vilander | Ferrari F430 GT2 | MI | 76 |
| 10 | GT2 | 50 | (Italy) AF Corse | (Italy) Gianmaria Bruni (Finland) Toni Vilander | Ferrari 4.0 L V8 | MI | 76 |
| 11 | GT2 | 59 | (United Kingdom) Trackspeed Racing | (Germany) Jörg Bergmeister (Germany) Christian Mamerow | Porsche 997 GT3-RSR | MI | 76 |
| 11 | GT2 | 59 | (United Kingdom) Trackspeed Racing | (Germany) Jörg Bergmeister (Germany) Christian Mamerow | Porsche 4.0 L Flat-6 | MI | 76 |
| 12 | GT2 | 97 | (Italy) Brixia Racing | (France) Emmanuel Collard (Austria) Martin Ragginger | Porsche 997 GT3-RSR | MI | 76 |
| 12 | GT2 | 97 | (Italy) Brixia Racing | (France) Emmanuel Collard (Austria) Martin Ragginger | Porsche 4.0 L Flat-6 | MI | 76 |
| 13 | GT2 | 51 | (Italy) AF Corse | (Spain) Álvaro Barba (Italy) Niki Cadei | Ferrari F430 GT2 | MI | 75 |
| 13 | GT2 | 51 | (Italy) AF Corse | (Spain) Álvaro Barba (Italy) Niki Cadei | Ferrari 4.0 L V8 | MI | 75 |
| 14 | GT2 | 61 | (Belgium) Prospeed Competition | (Germany) Marc Lieb (Hong Kong) Darryl O'Young | Porsche 997 GT3-RSR | MI | 75 |
| 14 | GT2 | 61 | (Belgium) Prospeed Competition | (Germany) Marc Lieb (Hong Kong) Darryl O'Young | Porsche 4.0 L Flat-6 | MI | 75 |
| 15 | GT2 | 58 | (United Kingdom) Trackspeed Racing | (Germany) Sascha Maassen (United Kingdom) David Ashburn | Porsche 997 GT3-RSR | MI | 74 |
| 15 | GT2 | 58 | (United Kingdom) Trackspeed Racing | (Germany) Sascha Maassen (United Kingdom) David Ashburn | Porsche 4.0 L Flat-6 | MI | 74 |
| 16 | GT2 | 95 | (Argentina) PeCom Racing Team | (Argentina) Matías Russo (Argentina) Luís Pérez Companc | Ferrari F430 GT2 | MI | 73 |
| 16 | GT2 | 95 | (Argentina) PeCom Racing Team | (Argentina) Matías Russo (Argentina) Luís Pérez Companc | Ferrari 4.0 L V8 | MI | 73 |
| 17 | GT1 | 2 | (Germany) Vitaphone Racing Team | (Portugal) Miguel Ramos (Germany) Alex Müller | Maserati MC12 GT1 | MI | 72 |
| 17 | GT1 | 2 | (Germany) Vitaphone Racing Team | (Portugal) Miguel Ramos (Germany) Alex Müller | Maserati 6.0 L V12 | MI | 72 |
| 18 | GT1 | 35 | (Japan) Nissan Motorsports (United Kingdom) Gigawave Motorsports | (United Kingdom) Darren Turner (Germany) Michael Krumm | Nissan GT-R GT1 | MI | 61 |
| 18 | GT1 | 35 | (Japan) Nissan Motorsports (United Kingdom) Gigawave Motorsports | (United Kingdom) Darren Turner (Germany) Michael Krumm | Nissan 5.6 L V8 | MI | 61 |
| 19 DNF | GT1 | 40 | (Belgium) Marc VDS Racing Team | (Belgium) Renaud Kuppens (Belgium) Bas Leinders | Ford GT1 | MI | 35 |
| 19 DNF | GT1 | 40 | (Belgium) Marc VDS Racing Team | (Belgium) Renaud Kuppens (Belgium) Bas Leinders | Ford 5.0 L V8 | MI | 35 |
| 20 DNF | GT2 | 55 | (United Kingdom) CRS Racing | (Spain) Antonio García (United Kingdom) Tim Mullen | Ferrari F430 GT2 | MI | 34 |
| 20 DNF | GT2 | 55 | (United Kingdom) CRS Racing | (Spain) Antonio García (United Kingdom) Tim Mullen | Ferrari 4.0 L V8 | MI | 34 |
| 21 DNF | GT2 | 78 | (Italy) BMS Scuderia Italia | (Italy) Luigi Lucchini (Belgium) Stéphane Lémeret | Ferrari F430 GT2 | P | 17 |
| 21 DNF | GT2 | 78 | (Italy) BMS Scuderia Italia | (Italy) Luigi Lucchini (Belgium) Stéphane Lémeret | Ferrari 4.0 L V8 | P | 17 |

FIA GT Championship
| Previous race: FIA GT Paul Ricard 2 Hours | 2009 season | Next race: None |
