= 2009 FIA GT Oschersleben 2 Hours =

Layout of the Motorsport Arena Oschersleben

The 2009 FIA GT Oschersleben 2 Hours is the third round of the 2009 FIA GT Championship season. The took place at Motorsport Arena Oschersleben, Germany on 21 June 2009.

== Report ==
=== Qualifying ===
==== Qualifying result ====
Class winners are highlighted in bold.

Pos	Class	Team	Qualifying Driver	Lap Time
1	**GT1**	**#2 Vitaphone Racing Team**	**Alex Müller**	**1:24.546**
2	GT1	#14 K plus K Motorsport	Karl Wendlinger	1:24.865
3	GT1	#19 Luc Alphand Aventures	Xavier Maassen	1:25.160
4	GT1	#1 Vitaphone Racing Team	Michael Bartels	1:25.278
5	GT1	#18 K plus K Motorsport	Adam Lacko	1:25.291
6	GT1	#3 Selleslagh Racing Team	Bert Longin	1:25.560
7	GT1	#4 PK Carsport	Mike Hezemans	1:25.702
8	GT1	#40 Marc VDS Racing Team	Bas Leinders	1:26.634
9	GT1	#11 Full Speed Racing Team	Luke Hines	1:26.941
10	GT1	#35 Nissan Motorsports	Michael Krumm	1:27.431
11	**GT2**	**#97 Brixia Racing**	**Martin Ragginger**	**1:28.803**
12	GT2	#50 AF Corse	Gianmaria Bruni	1:28.953
13	GT2	#61 Prospeed Competition	Marco Holzer	1:29.108
14	GT2	#56 CRS Racing	Andrew Kirkaldy	1:29.346
15	GT2	#77 BMS Scuderia Italia	Paolo Ruberti	1:29.534
16	GT2	#55 CRS Racing	Tim Mullen	1:29.553
17	GT2	#51 AF Corse	Álvaro Barba	1:29.799
18	GT2	#95 PeCom Racing	Matías Russo	1:29.836
19	GT2	#80 Hexis Racing AMR	Stefan Mücke	1:29.916
20	GT2	#60 Prospeed Competition	Emmanuel Collard	1:30.102
21	GT2	#78 BMS Scuderia Italia	Kenneth Heyer	1:31.536
22	GT1	#13 Full Speed Racing Team		no time
23	GT1	#44 Matech GT Racing		no time
24	GT2	#59 Trackspeed Racing		Disallowed^{†}

† – #59 Trackspeed Racing was disqualified from the GT2 Pole Position after it was found that they had used incorrect tires and that the airbox was not sealed.

=== Race report ===
The No. 61 Prospeed Competition Porsche was disqualified from the race after it was discovered in post-race technical inspection that part of its engine did not conform to the homologation requirements for the 997 GT3-RSR. Prospeed, who had finished second in the GT2 category, appealed the decision, but this appeal was later rejected by the FIA and the results were finalized in October.

==== Race result ====
Class winners in bold. Cars failing to complete 75% of winner's distance marked as Not Classified (NC).

Pos	Class	No	Team	Drivers	Chassis	Tyre	Laps
Pos	Class	No	Team	Drivers	Engine	Tyre	Laps
1	**GT1**	**4**	**(Belgium) PK Carsport**	**(Netherlands) Mike Hezemans (Belgium) Anthony Kumpen**	**Chevrolet Corvette C6.R**	MI	**71**
1	**GT1**	**4**	**(Belgium) PK Carsport**	**(Netherlands) Mike Hezemans (Belgium) Anthony Kumpen**	**Chevrolet LS7.R 7.0 L V8**	MI	**71**
2	GT1	1	(Germany) Vitaphone Racing Team	(Italy) Andrea Bertolini (Germany) Michael Bartels	Maserati MC12 GT1	MI	71
2	GT1	1	(Germany) Vitaphone Racing Team	(Italy) Andrea Bertolini (Germany) Michael Bartels	Maserati 6.0 L V12	MI	71
3	GT1	2	(Germany) Vitaphone Racing Team	(Portugal) Miguel Ramos (Germany) Alex Müller	Maserati MC12 GT1	MI	71
3	GT1	2	(Germany) Vitaphone Racing Team	(Portugal) Miguel Ramos (Germany) Alex Müller	Maserati 6.0 L V12	MI	71
4	GT1	3	(Belgium) Selleslagh Racing Team	(France) James Ruffier (Belgium) Bert Longin	Chevrolet Corvette C6.R	MI	71
4	GT1	3	(Belgium) Selleslagh Racing Team	(France) James Ruffier (Belgium) Bert Longin	Chevrolet LS7.R 7.0 L V8	MI	71
5	GT1	19	(France) Luc Alphand Aventures	(Netherlands) Xavier Maassen (Italy) Thomas Biagi	Chevrolet Corvette C6.R	MI	70
5	GT1	19	(France) Luc Alphand Aventures	(Netherlands) Xavier Maassen (Italy) Thomas Biagi	Chevrolet LS7.R 7.0 L V8	MI	70
6	GT1	40	(Belgium) Marc VDS Racing Team	(Belgium) Bas Leinders (Belgium) Renaud Kuppens	Ford GT1	MI	70
6	GT1	40	(Belgium) Marc VDS Racing Team	(Belgium) Bas Leinders (Belgium) Renaud Kuppens	Ford 5.0 L V8	MI	70
7	GT1	44	(Switzerland) Matech GT Racing	(Germany) Thomas Mutsch (Germany) Marc Hennerici	Ford GT1	MI	70
7	GT1	44	(Switzerland) Matech GT Racing	(Germany) Thomas Mutsch (Germany) Marc Hennerici	Ford 5.0 L V8	MI	70
8	GT1	11	(Austria) Full Speed Racing Team	(Belgium) Stéphane Lémeret (United Kingdom) Luke Hines	Saleen S7-R	P	69
8	GT1	11	(Austria) Full Speed Racing Team	(Belgium) Stéphane Lémeret (United Kingdom) Luke Hines	Ford 7.0 L V8	P	69
9	**GT2**	**50**	**(Italy) AF Corse**	**(Finland) Toni Vilander (Italy) Gianmaria Bruni**	**Ferrari F430 GT2**	MI	**69**
9	**GT2**	**50**	**(Italy) AF Corse**	**(Finland) Toni Vilander (Italy) Gianmaria Bruni**	**Ferrari 4.0 L V8**	MI	**69**
10	GT2	80	(France) Hexis Racing AMR	(France) Frédéric Makowiecki (Germany) Stefan Mücke	Aston Martin V8 Vantage GT2	MI	69
10	GT2	80	(France) Hexis Racing AMR	(France) Frédéric Makowiecki (Germany) Stefan Mücke	Aston Martin 4.5 L V8	MI	69
11	GT2	55	(United Kingdom) CRS Racing	(United Kingdom) Tim Mullen (Canada) Chris Niarchos	Ferrari F430 GT2	MI	68
11	GT2	55	(United Kingdom) CRS Racing	(United Kingdom) Tim Mullen (Canada) Chris Niarchos	Ferrari 4.0 L V8	MI	68
12	GT2	97	(Italy) Brixia Racing	(Italy) Luigi Lucchini (Austria) Martin Ragginger	Porsche 997 GT3-RSR	MI	68
12	GT2	97	(Italy) Brixia Racing	(Italy) Luigi Lucchini (Austria) Martin Ragginger	Porsche 4.0 L Flat-6	MI	68
13	GT1	35	(Japan) Nissan Motorsports (United Kingdom) Gigawave Motorsports	(Germany) Michael Krumm (United Kingdom) Darren Turner	Nissan GT-R GT1	MI	68
13	GT1	35	(Japan) Nissan Motorsports (United Kingdom) Gigawave Motorsports	(Germany) Michael Krumm (United Kingdom) Darren Turner	Nissan 5.6 L V8	MI	68
14	GT1	14	(Czech Republic) K plus K Motorsport	(Austria) Karl Wendlinger (United Kingdom) Ryan Sharp	Saleen S7-R	MI	67
14	GT1	14	(Czech Republic) K plus K Motorsport	(Austria) Karl Wendlinger (United Kingdom) Ryan Sharp	Ford 7.0 L V8	MI	67
15	GT2	56	(United Kingdom) CRS Racing	(United Kingdom) Andrew Kirkaldy (United Kingdom) Rob Bell	Ferrari F430 GT2	MI	67
15	GT2	56	(United Kingdom) CRS Racing	(United Kingdom) Andrew Kirkaldy (United Kingdom) Rob Bell	Ferrari 4.0 L V8	MI	67
16	GT2	59	(United Kingdom) Trackspeed Racing	(Germany) Jörg Bergmeister (United Kingdom) David Ashburn	Porsche 997 GT3-RSR	MI	66
16	GT2	59	(United Kingdom) Trackspeed Racing	(Germany) Jörg Bergmeister (United Kingdom) David Ashburn	Porsche 4.0 L Flat-6	MI	66
17	GT2	51	(Italy) AF Corse	(Spain) Álvaro Barba (Italy) Niki Cadei	Ferrari F430 GT2	MI	64
17	GT2	51	(Italy) AF Corse	(Spain) Álvaro Barba (Italy) Niki Cadei	Ferrari 4.0 L V8	MI	64
18	GT2	78	(Italy) BMS Scuderia Italia	(Germany) Kenneth Heyer (Italy) Diego Romanini	Ferrari F430 GT2	MI	63
18	GT2	78	(Italy) BMS Scuderia Italia	(Germany) Kenneth Heyer (Italy) Diego Romanini	Ferrari 4.0 L V8	MI	63
19 DNF	GT1	13	(Austria) Full Speed Racing Team	(United Kingdom) Johnny Mowlem (Italy) Ferdinando Monfardini	Saleen S7-R	P	42
19 DNF	GT1	13	(Austria) Full Speed Racing Team	(United Kingdom) Johnny Mowlem (Italy) Ferdinando Monfardini	Ford 7.0 L V8	P	42
20 DNF	GT2	95	(Argentina) PeCom Racing	(Argentina) Matías Russo (Argentina) Luis Pérez Companc	Ferrari F430 GT2	MI	18
20 DNF	GT2	95	(Argentina) PeCom Racing	(Argentina) Matías Russo (Argentina) Luis Pérez Companc	Ferrari 4.0 L V8	MI	18
21 DNF	GT2	77	(Italy) BMS Scuderia Italia	(Italy) Paolo Ruberti (Italy) Matteo Malucelli	Ferrari F430 GT2	MI	17
21 DNF	GT2	77	(Italy) BMS Scuderia Italia	(Italy) Paolo Ruberti (Italy) Matteo Malucelli	Ferrari 4.0 L V8	MI	17
22 DNF	GT2	60	(Belgium) Prospeed Competition	(France) Emmanuel Collard (United Kingdom) Richard Westbrook	Porsche 997 GT3-RSR	MI	16
22 DNF	GT2	60	(Belgium) Prospeed Competition	(France) Emmanuel Collard (United Kingdom) Richard Westbrook	Porsche 4.0 L Flat-6	MI	16
23 DNF	GT1	18	(Czech Republic) K plus K Motorsport	(Czech Republic) Adam Lacko (Mexico) Mario Domínguez	Saleen S7-R	MI	12
23 DNF	GT1	18	(Czech Republic) K plus K Motorsport	(Czech Republic) Adam Lacko (Mexico) Mario Domínguez	Ford 7.0 L V8	MI	12
DSQ	GT2	61	(Belgium) Prospeed Competition	(United Kingdom) Sean Edwards (Germany) Marco Holzer	Porsche 997 GT3-RSR	MI	69
DSQ	GT2	61	(Belgium) Prospeed Competition	(United Kingdom) Sean Edwards (Germany) Marco Holzer	Porsche 4.0 L Flat-6	MI	69

FIA GT Championship
Previous race: FIA GT Adria 2 Hours	2009 season	Next race: Spa 24 Hours
