= 2009 FIA GT Algarve 2 Hours =

Layout of the Algarve International Circuit

The 2009 FIA GT Algarve 2 Hours was the sixth round of the 2009 FIA GT Championship season. It took place at the Autódromo Internacional do Algarve, Portugal on 20 September 2009. Selleslagh Racing Team won their first race of the season while their driver James Ruffier's won his first race in FIA GT. Pekaracing earned second place while the No. 2 Vitaphone Racing car completed the podium with a pass on the second to last lap of the race. The No. 51 AF Corse Ferrari won in GT2 followed by the No. 60 Prospeed Competition Porsche and No. 77 BMS Scuderia Italia Ferrari.

== Report ==
=== Qualifying ===
==== Qualifying results ====
Pole position winners in each class are marked in bold.

Pos	Class	Team	Driver	Lap Time	Grid
1	**GT1**	**No. 8 Sangari Team Brazil**	**Enrique Bernoldi**	**1:40.664**	**1**
2	GT1	No. 3 Selleslagh Racing Team	James Ruffier	1:40.754	2
3	GT1	No. 2 Vitaphone Racing Team	Alex Müller	1:40.820	8^{†}
4	GT1	No. 4 Peka Racing	Anthony Kumpen	1:41.164	3
5	GT1	No. 33 Vitaphone Racing Team DHL	Alessandro Pier Guidi	1:41.168	4
6	GT1	No. 1 Vitaphone Racing Team	Andrea Bertolini	1:41.410	5
7	GT1	No. 40 Marc VDS Racing Team	Bas Leinders	1:43.854	6
8	**GT2**	**No. 95 PeCom Racing Team**	**Matías Russo**	**1:45.998**	**7**
9	GT2	No. 97 Brixia Racing	Martin Ragginger	1:46.095	9
10	GT2	No. 61 Prospeed Competition	Marco Holzer	1:46.146	10
11	GT2	No. 77 BMS Scuderia Italia	Matteo Malucelli	1:46.243	11
12	GT2	No. 50 AF Corse	Gianmaria Bruni	1:46.301	12
13	GT2	No. 51 AF Corse	Álvaro Barba	1:46.369	13
14	GT2	No. 56 CRS Racing	Rob Bell	1:46.461	14
15	GT2	No. 60 Prospeed Competition	Emmanuel Collard	1:46.528	15
16	GT2	No. 55 CRS Racing	Tim Mullen	1:46.696	16
17	GT2	No. 59 Trackspeed Racing	Tim Sugden	1:47.360	17
18	GT2	No. 78 BMS Scuderia Italia	Diego Romanini	1:48.233	18
19	GT1	No. 11 Full Speed Racing Team	Did Not Participate		19

† – The No. 2 Vitaphone Maserati was penalized five grid spots after causing an avoidable accident at the 2009 Budapest City Challenge.

== Race results ==
Class winners in bold. Cars failing to complete 75% of winner's distance marked as Not Classified (NC).

Pos	Class	No	Team	Drivers	Chassis	Tyre	Laps
Pos	Class	No	Team	Drivers	Engine	Tyre	Laps
1	**GT1**	**3**	**(Belgium) Selleslagh Racing Team**	**(Belgium) Bert Longin (France) James Ruffier**	**Chevrolet Corvette C6.R**	MI	**66**
1	**GT1**	**3**	**(Belgium) Selleslagh Racing Team**	**(Belgium) Bert Longin (France) James Ruffier**	**Chevrolet LS7.R 7.0 L V8**	MI	**66**
2	GT1	4	(Belgium) Peka Racing	(Belgium) Anthony Kumpen (Netherlands) Mike Hezemans	Chevrolet Corvette C6.R	MI	66
2	GT1	4	(Belgium) Peka Racing	(Belgium) Anthony Kumpen (Netherlands) Mike Hezemans	Chevrolet LS7.R 7.0 L V8	MI	66
3	GT1	2	(Germany) Vitaphone Racing Team	(Portugal) Miguel Ramos (Germany) Alex Müller	Maserati MC12 GT1	MI	66
3	GT1	2	(Germany) Vitaphone Racing Team	(Portugal) Miguel Ramos (Germany) Alex Müller	Maserati 6.0 L V12	MI	66
4	GT1	8	Sangari Team Brazil	(Brazil) Enrique Bernoldi (Brazil) Roberto Streit (Netherlands) Xavier Maassen	Chevrolet Corvette C6.R	MI	66
4	GT1	8	Sangari Team Brazil	(Brazil) Enrique Bernoldi (Brazil) Roberto Streit (Netherlands) Xavier Maassen	Chevrolet LS7.R 7.0 L V8	MI	66
5	GT1	1	(Germany) Vitaphone Racing Team	(Germany) Michael Bartels (Italy) Andrea Bertolini	Maserati MC12 GT1	MI	66
5	GT1	1	(Germany) Vitaphone Racing Team	(Germany) Michael Bartels (Italy) Andrea Bertolini	Maserati 6.0 L V12	MI	66
6	GT1	33	(Germany) Vitaphone Racing Team DHL	(Italy) Alessandro Pier Guidi (Italy) Matteo Bobbi	Maserati MC12 GT1	MI	66
6	GT1	33	(Germany) Vitaphone Racing Team DHL	(Italy) Alessandro Pier Guidi (Italy) Matteo Bobbi	Maserati 6.0 L V12	MI	66
7	**GT2**	**51**	**(Italy) AF Corse**	**(Spain) Álvaro Barba (Italy) Niki Cadei**	**Ferrari F430 GT2**	MI	**64**
7	**GT2**	**51**	**(Italy) AF Corse**	**(Spain) Álvaro Barba (Italy) Niki Cadei**	**Ferrari 4.0 L V8**	MI	**64**
8	GT2	60	(Belgium) Prospeed Competition	(France) Emmanuel Collard (United Kingdom) Richard Westbrook	Porsche 997 GT3-RSR	MI	64
8	GT2	60	(Belgium) Prospeed Competition	(France) Emmanuel Collard (United Kingdom) Richard Westbrook	Porsche 4.0 L Flat-6	MI	64
9	GT2	77	(Italy) BMS Scuderia Italia	(Italy) Paolo Ruberti (Italy) Matteo Malucelli	Ferrari F430 GT2	P	64
9	GT2	77	(Italy) BMS Scuderia Italia	(Italy) Paolo Ruberti (Italy) Matteo Malucelli	Ferrari 4.0 L V8	P	64
10	GT2	95	(Argentina) PeCom Racing Team	(Argentina) Matías Russo (Argentina) Luís Pérez Companc	Ferrari F430 GT2	MI	64
10	GT2	95	(Argentina) PeCom Racing Team	(Argentina) Matías Russo (Argentina) Luís Pérez Companc	Ferrari 4.0 L V8	MI	64
11	GT2	56	(United Kingdom) CRS Racing	(United Kingdom) Rob Bell (United Kingdom) Andrew Kirkaldy	Ferrari F430 GT2	MI	64
11	GT2	56	(United Kingdom) CRS Racing	(United Kingdom) Rob Bell (United Kingdom) Andrew Kirkaldy	Ferrari 4.0 L V8	MI	64
12	GT2	50	(Italy) AF Corse	(Italy) Gianmaria Bruni (Finland) Toni Vilander	Ferrari F430 GT2	MI	64
12	GT2	50	(Italy) AF Corse	(Italy) Gianmaria Bruni (Finland) Toni Vilander	Ferrari 4.0 L V8	MI	64
13	GT2	97	(Italy) Brixia Racing	(Italy) Luigi Lucchini (Austria) Martin Ragginger	Porsche 997 GT3-RSR	MI	64
13	GT2	97	(Italy) Brixia Racing	(Italy) Luigi Lucchini (Austria) Martin Ragginger	Porsche 4.0 L Flat-6	MI	64
14	GT2	55	(United Kingdom) CRS Racing	(Canada) Chris Niarchos (United Kingdom) Tim Mullen	Ferrari F430 GT2	MI	64
14	GT2	55	(United Kingdom) CRS Racing	(Canada) Chris Niarchos (United Kingdom) Tim Mullen	Ferrari 4.0 L V8	MI	64
15	GT2	78	(Italy) BMS Scuderia Italia	(Italy) Diego Romanini (Italy) Ettore Bonaldi	Ferrari F430 GT2	P	63
15	GT2	78	(Italy) BMS Scuderia Italia	(Italy) Diego Romanini (Italy) Ettore Bonaldi	Ferrari 4.0 L V8	P	63
16	GT2	59	(United Kingdom) Trackspeed Racing	(United Kingdom) Tim Sugden (United Kingdom) David Ashburn	Porsche 997 GT3-RSR	MI	63
16	GT2	59	(United Kingdom) Trackspeed Racing	(United Kingdom) Tim Sugden (United Kingdom) David Ashburn	Porsche 4.0 L Flat-6	MI	63
17 DNF	GT1	40	(Belgium) Marc VDS Racing Team	(Belgium) Renaud Kuppens (Belgium) Bas Leinders	Ford GT1	MI	59
17 DNF	GT1	40	(Belgium) Marc VDS Racing Team	(Belgium) Renaud Kuppens (Belgium) Bas Leinders	Ford 5.0 L V8	MI	59
18 DNF	GT1	11	(Austria) Full Speed Racing Team	(Belgium) Stéphane Lémeret (United Kingdom) Luke Hines	Saleen S7-R	P	52
18 DNF	GT1	11	(Austria) Full Speed Racing Team	(Belgium) Stéphane Lémeret (United Kingdom) Luke Hines	Ford 7.0 L V8	P	52
19 DNF	GT2	61	(Belgium) Prospeed Competition	(Germany) Marco Holzer (Hong Kong) Darryl O'Young	Porsche 997 GT3-RSR	MI	34
19 DNF	GT2	61	(Belgium) Prospeed Competition	(Germany) Marco Holzer (Hong Kong) Darryl O'Young	Porsche 4.0 L Flat-6	MI	34

== See also ==
- 2009 Algarve GP2 Series round

FIA GT Championship
Previous race: Budapest City Challenge	2009 season	Next race: FIA GT Paul Ricard 2 Hours
