= 2009 FIA GT Paul Ricard 2 Hours =

Circuit Paul Ricard (1C-V2)

The 2009 FIA GT Paul Ricard 2 Hours was the penultimate round of the 2009 FIA GT Championship season. It took place at Circuit Paul Ricard on 4 October 2009. The race was won by the Corvette of Enrique Bernoldi and Roberto Streit for Sangari Team Brazil, ahead of the No. 2 Vitaphone Racing Team Maserati and Selleslagh Racing Team Corvette. In the GT2 category, Toni Vilander and Gianmaria Bruni won from pole position in the AF Corse Ferrari, leading the Prospeed Competition Porsche and the second AF Corse Ferrari.

Vitaphone Racing Team and AF Corse both secured the FIA GT Teams Championships for the GT1 and GT2 categories in this race.

== Report ==
=== Qualifying ===
Qualifying was led by the No. Sangari Corvette of Enrique Bernoldi, however the car had been given a five grid spot penalty prior to qualifying for causing an avoidable accident during pre-qualifying practice. This moved the Sangari car back to sixth, and moved Alex Müller to pole position and allowing Vitaphone Racing Team to lock out the front row. In the GT2 category Gianmaria Bruni of AF Corse secured an all Ferrari front row alongside CRS Racing.

==== Qualifying results ====
Pole position winners in each class are marked in bold.

Pos	Class	Team	Driver	Lap Time	Grid
1	GT1	No. 8 Sangari Team Brazil	Enrique Bernoldi	2:00.919	6
2	**GT1**	**No. 2 Vitaphone Racing Team**	**Alex Müller**	**2:01.856**	**1**
3	GT1	No. 33 Vitaphone Racing Team DHL	Alessandro Pier Guidi	2:02.043	2
4	GT1	No. 1 Vitaphone Racing Team	Andrea Bertolini	2:02.044	3
5	GT1	No. 3 Selleslagh Racing Team	James Ruffier	2:02.300	4
6	GT1	No. 4 Peka Racing	Mike Hezemans	2:02.328	5
7	GT1	No. 19 Luc Alphand Aventures	Thomas Biagi	2:02.541	7
8	GT1	No. 21 Solution F	Olivier Panis	2:04.796	8
9	GT1	No. 40 Marc VDS Racing Team	Bas Leinders	2:05.853	9
10	GT1	No. 44 Matech GT Racing	Thomas Mutsch	2:07.108	10
11	**GT2**	**No. 50 AF Corse**	**Gianmaria Bruni**	**2:08.314**	**11**
12	GT2	No. 55 CRS Racing	Tim Mullen	2:08.480	12
13	GT2	No. 97 Brixia Racing	Martin Ragginger	2:08.924	13
14	GT2	No. 59 Trackspeed Racing	Sascha Maassen	2:08.972	14
15	GT2	No. 51 AF Corse	Álvaro Barba	2:09.436	15
16	GT2	No. 61 Prospeed Competition	Darryl O'Young	2:09.483	16
17	GT2	No. 60 Prospeed Competition	Emmanuel Collard	2:09.534	17
18	GT2	No. 95 PeCom Racing Team	Matías Russo	2:09.551	18
19	GT2	No. 56 CRS Racing	Andrew Kirkaldy	2:09.722	19
20	GT2	No. 77 BMS Scuderia Italia	Matteo Malucelli	2:09.743	20
21	GT2	No. 78 BMS Scuderia Italia	Diego Romanini	2:11.078	21

=== Race ===
==== Race results ====
Class winners in bold. Cars failing to complete 75% of winner's distance are marked as Not Classified (NC).

Pos	Class	No	Team	Drivers	Chassis	Tyre	Laps
Pos	Class	No	Team	Drivers	Engine	Tyre	Laps
1	**GT1**	**8**	**Sangari Team Brazil**	**(Brazil) Enrique Bernoldi (Brazil) Roberto Streit**	**Chevrolet Corvette C6.R**	MI	**57**
1	**GT1**	**8**	**Sangari Team Brazil**	**(Brazil) Enrique Bernoldi (Brazil) Roberto Streit**	**Chevrolet LS7.R 7.0 L V8**	MI	**57**
2	GT1	2	(Germany) Vitaphone Racing Team	(Portugal) Miguel Ramos (Germany) Alex Müller	Maserati MC12 GT1	MI	57
2	GT1	2	(Germany) Vitaphone Racing Team	(Portugal) Miguel Ramos (Germany) Alex Müller	Maserati 6.0 L V12	MI	57
3	GT1	3	(Belgium) Sellesagh Racing Team	(Belgium) Bert Longin (France) James Ruffier	Chevrolet Corvette C6.R	MI	57
3	GT1	3	(Belgium) Sellesagh Racing Team	(Belgium) Bert Longin (France) James Ruffier	Chevrolet LS7.R 7.0 L V8	MI	57
4	GT1	19	(France) Luc Alphand Aventures	(Netherlands) Xavier Maassen (Italy) Thomas Biagi	Chevrolet Corvette C6.R	MI	57
4	GT1	19	(France) Luc Alphand Aventures	(Netherlands) Xavier Maassen (Italy) Thomas Biagi	Chevrolet LS7.R 7.0 L V8	MI	57
5	GT1	1	(Germany) Vitaphone Racing Team	(Germany) Michael Bartels (Italy) Andrea Bertolini	Maserati MC12 GT1	MI	57
5	GT1	1	(Germany) Vitaphone Racing Team	(Germany) Michael Bartels (Italy) Andrea Bertolini	Maserati 6.0 L V12	MI	57
6	GT1	33	(Germany) Vitaphone Racing Team DHL	(Italy) Alessandro Pier Guidi (Italy) Matteo Bobbi	Maserati MC12 GT1	MI	57
6	GT1	33	(Germany) Vitaphone Racing Team DHL	(Italy) Alessandro Pier Guidi (Italy) Matteo Bobbi	Maserati 6.0 L V12	MI	57
7	GT1	21	(France) Solution F	(France) Ange Barde (France) Olivier Panis	Ferrari 550-GTS Maranello	MI	55
7	GT1	21	(France) Solution F	(France) Ange Barde (France) Olivier Panis	Ferrari 5.9 L V12	MI	55
8	GT1	44	(Switzerland) Matech GT Racing	(Germany) Thomas Mutsch (Switzerland) Henri Moser	Ford GT1	MI	55
8	GT1	44	(Switzerland) Matech GT Racing	(Germany) Thomas Mutsch (Switzerland) Henri Moser	Ford 5.0 L V8	MI	55
9	**GT2**	**50**	**(Italy) AF Corse**	**(Finland) Toni Vilander (Italy) Gianmaria Bruni**	**Ferrari F430 GT2**	MI	**55**
9	**GT2**	**50**	**(Italy) AF Corse**	**(Finland) Toni Vilander (Italy) Gianmaria Bruni**	**Ferrari 4.0 L V8**	MI	**55**
10	GT2	60	(Belgium) Prospeed Competition	(France) Emmanuel Collard (United Kingdom) Richard Westbrook	Porsche 997 GT3-RSR	MI	55
10	GT2	60	(Belgium) Prospeed Competition	(France) Emmanuel Collard (United Kingdom) Richard Westbrook	Porsche 4.0 L Flat-6	MI	55
11	GT2	51	(Italy) AF Corse	(Spain) Álvaro Barba (Italy) Niki Cadei	Ferrari F430 GT2	MI	55
11	GT2	51	(Italy) AF Corse	(Spain) Álvaro Barba (Italy) Niki Cadei	Ferrari 4.0 L V8	MI	55
12	GT2	95	(Argentina) PeCom Racing Team	(Argentina) Luis Pérez Companc (Argentina) Matías Russo	Ferrari F430 GT2	MI	55
12	GT2	95	(Argentina) PeCom Racing Team	(Argentina) Luis Pérez Companc (Argentina) Matías Russo	Ferrari 4.0 L V8	MI	55
13	GT2	55	(United Kingdom) CRS Racing	(Canada) Chris Niarchos (United Kingdom) Tim Mullen	Ferrari F430 GT2	MI	55
13	GT2	55	(United Kingdom) CRS Racing	(Canada) Chris Niarchos (United Kingdom) Tim Mullen	Ferrari 4.0 L V8	MI	55
14	GT1	40	(Belgium) Marc VDS Racing Team	(Belgium) Bas Leinders (Belgium) Renaud Kuppens	Ford GT1	MI	55
14	GT1	40	(Belgium) Marc VDS Racing Team	(Belgium) Bas Leinders (Belgium) Renaud Kuppens	Ford 5.0 L V8	MI	55
15	GT2	97	(Italy) Brixia Racing	(Italy) Luigi Lucchini (Austria) Martin Ragginger	Porsche 997 GT3-RSR	MI	54
15	GT2	97	(Italy) Brixia Racing	(Italy) Luigi Lucchini (Austria) Martin Ragginger	Porsche 4.0 L Flat-6	MI	54
16	GT2	77	(Italy) BMS Scuderia Italia	(Italy) Matteo Malucelli (Italy) Paolo Ruberti	Ferrari F430 GT2	P	54
16	GT2	77	(Italy) BMS Scuderia Italia	(Italy) Matteo Malucelli (Italy) Paolo Ruberti	Ferrari 4.0 L V8	P	54
17	GT2	56	(United Kingdom) CRS Racing	(United Kingdom) Andrew Kirkaldy (United Kingdom) Rob Bell	Ferrari F430 GT2	MI	54
17	GT2	56	(United Kingdom) CRS Racing	(United Kingdom) Andrew Kirkaldy (United Kingdom) Rob Bell	Ferrari 4.0 L V8	MI	54
18	GT2	59	(United Kingdom) Trackspeed Racing	(Germany) Sascha Maassen (United Kingdom) David Ashburn	Porsche 997 GT3-RSR	MI	54
18	GT2	59	(United Kingdom) Trackspeed Racing	(Germany) Sascha Maassen (United Kingdom) David Ashburn	Porsche 4.0 L Flat-6	MI	54
19 DNF	GT2	78	(Italy) BMS Scuderia Italia	(Italy) Ettore Bonaldi (Italy) Diego Romanini	Ferrari F430 GT2	P	45
19 DNF	GT2	78	(Italy) BMS Scuderia Italia	(Italy) Ettore Bonaldi (Italy) Diego Romanini	Ferrari 4.0 L V8	P	45
20 DNF	GT1	4	(Belgium) Peka Racing	(Netherlands) Mike Hezemans (Belgium) Anthony Kumpen	Chevrolet Corvette C6.R	MI	40
20 DNF	GT1	4	(Belgium) Peka Racing	(Netherlands) Mike Hezemans (Belgium) Anthony Kumpen	Chevrolet LS7.R 7.0 L V8	MI	40
DSQ	GT2	61	(Belgium) Prospeed Competition	(Hong Kong) Darryl O'Young (Germany) Marco Holzer	Porsche 997 GT3-RSR	MI	53
DSQ	GT2	61	(Belgium) Prospeed Competition	(Hong Kong) Darryl O'Young (Germany) Marco Holzer	Porsche 4.0 L Flat-6	MI	53

FIA GT Championship
Previous race: FIA GT Algarve 2 Hours	2009 season	Next race: FIA GT Zolder 2 Hours
