= 2009 FIA GT Championship =

Sports season

Seasons
- ← 2008 2010 (GT1); 2010 (GT2) →

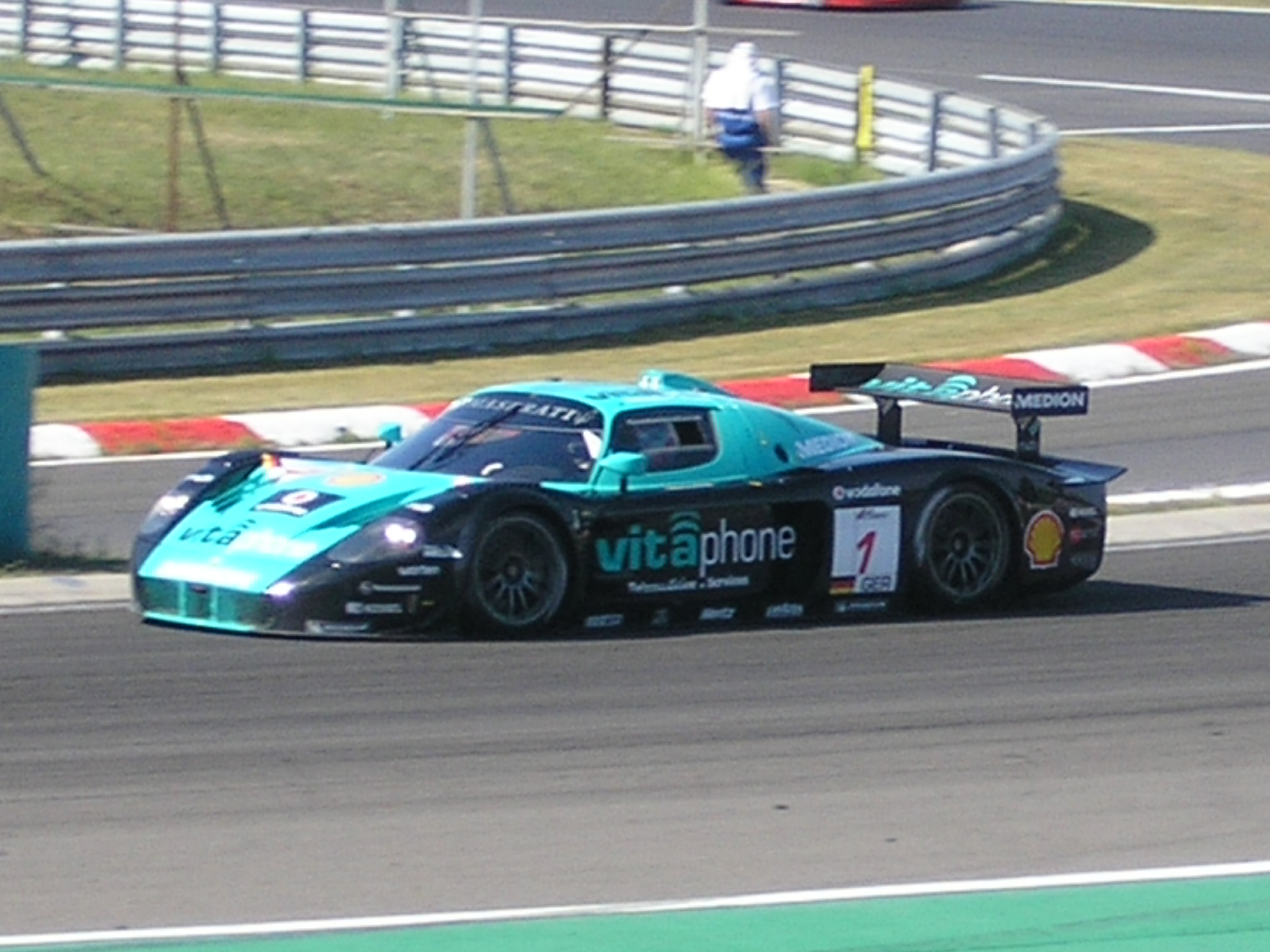
Michael Bartels and Andrea Bertolini won the GT1 Championship for Drivers

The 2009 FIA GT Championship season was the thirteenth and final season of the FIA GT Championship for grand tourer cars competing in the GT1 and GT2 categories. The season began 3 May, and ended 25 October after eight races. This was also the final season of a combined GT1 and GT2 championship before the launch of the FIA GT1 World Championship in 2010.

Vitaphone Racing Team Maserati drivers Michael Bartels and Andrea Bertolini successfully defended their GT1 Championships, pulling clear of the rivals in the final two events of the season after a close battle with the Peka Racing Chevrolet team of Anthony Kumpen and Mike Hezemans. Bartels and Bertolini won races at Adria International Raceway and Hungaroring on the way to the title, a third championship each for the pair. With the assistance of Miguel Ramos and Alex Müller in the team's second Maserati MC12 GT1, Vitaphone Racing Team also secured the Teams Championship.

In the lower specification GT2 category, former Porsche Supercup champion Richard Westbrook won the GT2 championship, driving a Prospeed Competition Porsche. Westbrook won the title by just two points over AF Corse Ferrari pairing of Gianmaria Bruni and Toni Vilander. Controversially Westbrook was split from his season long partner Emmanuel Collard at the final round, swapping cars with Brixia Racing driver Marco Holzer in a successful attempt to maximise Porsche's chances of defeating the Ferrari pairing. AF Corse, with the help of the team's second car of Álvaro Barba and Niki Cadei, did defeat Prospeed in the teams championship. CRS Racing driver Chris Niarchos was awarded the Citation Cup for amateur drivers.

== Schedule ==
The 2009 schedule was initially announced by the FIA on 5 November 2008, with seven events consisting of two-hour races, the Bucharest City Challenge of two separate one-hour races, and the Spa 24 Hours. Adria's event was once again scheduled to take place at night. However at a further meeting of the FIA on 17 March 2009 the calendar was set at eight rounds, with the cancellation of the Potrero de los Funes event and the inclusion of Circuit Paul Ricard. This decreased the number of two-hour races from seven to six.

On 16 June the Bucharest Ring, Romania cancelled their planned FIA GT event. The series therefore replaced the fifth round with an event at the Hungaroring in Hungary which would return to the normal two-hour race format.

Rnd	Race	Circuit	Date
1	(United Kingdom) RAC Tourist Trophy	Silverstone Circuit	3 May
2	(Italy) Adria 2 Hours	Adria International Raceway	16 May
3	(Germany) Oschersleben 2 Hours	Motorsport Arena Oschersleben	21 June
4	(Belgium) 24 Hours of Spa	Circuit de Spa-Francorchamps	25 July; 26 July
5	(Hungary) Budapest City Challenge	Hungaroring	30 August
6	(Portugal) Algarve 2 Hours	Autódromo Internacional do Algarve	20 September
7	(France) Paul Ricard 2 Hours	Circuit Paul Ricard	4 October
8	(Belgium) Zolder 2 Hours	Circuit Zolder	25 October

== Entry list ==
=== GT1 ===
Entrant	Car	Engine	Tyre	No.	Drivers	Rounds
(Germany) Vitaphone Racing Team	Maserati MC12 GT1	Maserati M144B/2 6.0 L V12	M	1	(Germany) Michael Bartels	All
(Germany) Vitaphone Racing Team	Maserati MC12 GT1	Maserati M144B/2 6.0 L V12	M	1	(Italy) Andrea Bertolini	All
(Germany) Vitaphone Racing Team	Maserati MC12 GT1	Maserati M144B/2 6.0 L V12	M	1	(France) Stéphane Sarrazin	4
(Germany) Vitaphone Racing Team	Maserati MC12 GT1	Maserati M144B/2 6.0 L V12	M	1	(Brazil) Alexandre Negrão	4
(Germany) Vitaphone Racing Team	Maserati MC12 GT1	Maserati M144B/2 6.0 L V12	M	2	(Portugal) Miguel Ramos	All
(Germany) Vitaphone Racing Team	Maserati MC12 GT1	Maserati M144B/2 6.0 L V12	M	2	(Germany) Alex Müller	All
(Germany) Vitaphone Racing Team	Maserati MC12 GT1	Maserati M144B/2 6.0 L V12	M	2	(Belgium) Eric van de Poele	4
(Germany) Vitaphone Racing Team	Maserati MC12 GT1	Maserati M144B/2 6.0 L V12	M	2	(Portugal) Pedro Lamy	4
(Germany) Vitaphone Racing Team DHL	Maserati MC12 GT1	Maserati M144B/2 6.0 L V12	M	33	(Italy) Alessandro Pier Guidi	4–8
(Germany) Vitaphone Racing Team DHL	Maserati MC12 GT1	Maserati M144B/2 6.0 L V12	M	33	(Belgium) Vincent Vosse	4
(Germany) Vitaphone Racing Team DHL	Maserati MC12 GT1	Maserati M144B/2 6.0 L V12	M	33	(Sweden) Carl Rosenblad	4
(Germany) Vitaphone Racing Team DHL	Maserati MC12 GT1	Maserati M144B/2 6.0 L V12	M	33	(Belgium) Stéphane Lémeret	4
(Germany) Vitaphone Racing Team DHL	Maserati MC12 GT1	Maserati M144B/2 6.0 L V12	M	33	(Italy) Matteo Bobbi	5–8
(Belgium) Selleslagh Racing Team	Corvette C6.R	Chevrolet LS7.R 7.0 L V8	M	3	(Belgium) Bert Longin	All
(Belgium) Selleslagh Racing Team	Corvette C6.R	Chevrolet LS7.R 7.0 L V8	M	3	(France) James Ruffier	All
(Belgium) Selleslagh Racing Team	Corvette C6.R	Chevrolet LS7.R 7.0 L V8	M	3	(Belgium) Maxime Soulet	4
(Belgium) Selleslagh Racing Team	Corvette C6.R	Chevrolet LS7.R 7.0 L V8	M	3	(United Kingdom) Oliver Gavin	4
(Belgium) PekaRacing nv	Corvette C6.R	Chevrolet LS7.R 7.0 L V8	M	4	(Belgium) Anthony Kumpen	All
(Belgium) PekaRacing nv	Corvette C6.R	Chevrolet LS7.R 7.0 L V8	M	4	(Netherlands) Mike Hezemans	All
(Belgium) PekaRacing nv	Corvette C6.R	Chevrolet LS7.R 7.0 L V8	M	4	(Belgium) Kurt Mollekens	4
(Belgium) PekaRacing nv	Corvette C6.R	Chevrolet LS7.R 7.0 L V8	M	4	(Netherlands) Jos Menten	4
Sangari Team Brazil	Corvette C6.R	Chevrolet LS7.R 7.0 L V8	M	8	(Brazil) Enrique Bernoldi	4–8
Sangari Team Brazil	Corvette C6.R	Chevrolet LS7.R 7.0 L V8	M	8	(Brazil) Roberto Streit	4–8
Sangari Team Brazil	Corvette C6.R	Chevrolet LS7.R 7.0 L V8	M	8	(Netherlands) Xavier Maassen	4, 6
(Luxembourg) DKR Engineering	Corvette C6.R	Chevrolet LS7.R 7.0 L V8	M	9	(Netherlands) Jos Menten	1
(Luxembourg) DKR Engineering	Corvette C6.R	Chevrolet LS7.R 7.0 L V8	M	9	(Finland) Markus Palttala	1
(Austria) Full Speed Racing	Saleen S7-R	Ford Windsor 7.0 L V8	P	11	(Belgium) Stéphane Lémeret	1–3, 5–6
(Austria) Full Speed Racing	Saleen S7-R	Ford Windsor 7.0 L V8	P	11	(United Kingdom) Luke Hines	1–3, 5–6
(Austria) Full Speed Racing	Saleen S7-R	Ford Windsor 7.0 L V8	P	11	(Belgium) Robert Dierick	4
(Austria) Full Speed Racing	Saleen S7-R	Ford Windsor 7.0 L V8	P	11	(Netherlands) Carlo van Dam	4
(Austria) Full Speed Racing	Saleen S7-R	Ford Windsor 7.0 L V8	P	11	(Netherlands) Arjan van der Zwaan	4
(Austria) Full Speed Racing	Saleen S7-R	Ford Windsor 7.0 L V8	P	11	(Netherlands) Rob van der Zwaan	4
(Austria) Full Speed Racing	Saleen S7-R	Ford Windsor 7.0 L V8	P	13	(Italy) Ferdinando Monfardini	1–3
(Austria) Full Speed Racing	Saleen S7-R	Ford Windsor 7.0 L V8	P	13	(Germany) Michael Orts	1–2
(Austria) Full Speed Racing	Saleen S7-R	Ford Windsor 7.0 L V8	P	13	(United Kingdom) Johnny Mowlem	3
(Czech Republic) K plus K Motorsport	Saleen S7-R	Ford Windsor 7.0 L V8	M	14	(Austria) Karl Wendlinger	1–3, 5
(Czech Republic) K plus K Motorsport	Saleen S7-R	Ford Windsor 7.0 L V8	M	14	(United Kingdom) Ryan Sharp	1–3, 5
(Czech Republic) K plus K Motorsport	Saleen S7-R	Ford Windsor 7.0 L V8	M	18	(Czech Republic) Adam Lacko	1–3, 5
(Czech Republic) K plus K Motorsport	Saleen S7-R	Ford Windsor 7.0 L V8	M	18	(Mexico) Mario Domínguez	1–3
(Czech Republic) K plus K Motorsport	Saleen S7-R	Ford Windsor 7.0 L V8	M	18	(Sweden) Max Nilsson	5
(France) Luc Alphand Aventures	Corvette C6.R	Chevrolet LS7.R 7.0 L V8	M	19	(Netherlands) Xavier Maassen	1–3, 5, 7–8
(France) Luc Alphand Aventures	Corvette C6.R	Chevrolet LS7.R 7.0 L V8	M	19	(France) Guillaume Moreau	1–2
(France) Luc Alphand Aventures	Corvette C6.R	Chevrolet LS7.R 7.0 L V8	M	19	(Italy) Thomas Biagi	3, 5, 7–8
(France) Solution F	Ferrari 550-GTS Maranello	Ferrari F133 5.9 L V12	M	21	(France) Ange Barde	7
(France) Solution F	Ferrari 550-GTS Maranello	Ferrari F133 5.9 L V12	M	21	(France) Olivier Panis	7
(Japan) Nissan Motorsports (Note: As Nissan Motorsports were considered to be a factory team, they and their drivers were ineligible to score championship points.)	Nissan GT-R GT1	Nissan VK56DE 5.6 L V8	M	35	(United Kingdom) Darren Turner	1, 3–4, 8
(Japan) Nissan Motorsports	Nissan GT-R GT1	Nissan VK56DE 5.6 L V8	M	35	(Germany) Michael Krumm	1, 3–4, 8
(Japan) Nissan Motorsports	Nissan GT-R GT1	Nissan VK56DE 5.6 L V8	M	35	(United Kingdom) Anthony Davidson	4
(Belgium) Marc VDS Racing Team	Ford GT1	Ford Cammer 5.0 L V8	M	40	(Belgium) Bas Leinders	All
(Belgium) Marc VDS Racing Team	Ford GT1	Ford Cammer 5.0 L V8	M	40	(Belgium) Renaud Kuppens	All
(Belgium) Marc VDS Racing Team	Ford GT1	Ford Cammer 5.0 L V8	M	40	(Belgium) Eric de Doncker	4
(Switzerland) Matech GT Racing	Ford GT1	Ford Cammer 5.0 L V8	M	44	(Germany) Thomas Mutsch	1–3, 5, 7
(Switzerland) Matech GT Racing	Ford GT1	Ford Cammer 5.0 L V8	M	44	(Italy) Thomas Biagi	1–2
(Switzerland) Matech GT Racing	Ford GT1	Ford Cammer 5.0 L V8	M	44	(Germany) Marc Hennerici	3
(Switzerland) Matech GT Racing	Ford GT1	Ford Cammer 5.0 L V8	M	44	(Switzerland) Jonathan Hirschi	5
(Switzerland) Matech GT Racing	Ford GT1	Ford Cammer 5.0 L V8	M	44	(Switzerland) Henri Moser	7

=== GT2 ===
Entrant	Car	Engine	Tyre	No.	Drivers	Rounds
(Italy) AF Corse	Ferrari F430 GTC	Ferrari F136 4.0 L V8	M	50	(Finland) Toni Vilander	All
(Italy) AF Corse	Ferrari F430 GTC	Ferrari F136 4.0 L V8	M	50	(Italy) Gianmaria Bruni	All
(Italy) AF Corse	Ferrari F430 GTC	Ferrari F136 4.0 L V8	M	50	(Brazil) Jaime Melo	4
(Italy) AF Corse	Ferrari F430 GTC	Ferrari F136 4.0 L V8	M	50	(Argentina) Luís Pérez Companc	4
(Italy) AF Corse	Ferrari F430 GTC	Ferrari F136 4.0 L V8	M	51	(Spain) Álvaro Barba	All
(Italy) AF Corse	Ferrari F430 GTC	Ferrari F136 4.0 L V8	M	51	(Italy) Niki Cadei	All
(Italy) AF Corse	Ferrari F430 GTC	Ferrari F136 4.0 L V8	M	51	(Argentina) Matías Russo	4
(Italy) AF Corse	Ferrari F430 GTC	Ferrari F136 4.0 L V8	M	51	(Germany) Pierre Kaffer	4
(United Kingdom) CRS Racing	Ferrari F430 GTC	Ferrari F136 4.0 L V8	M	55	(United Kingdom) Tim Mullen	All
(United Kingdom) CRS Racing	Ferrari F430 GTC	Ferrari F136 4.0 L V8	M	55	(Canada) Chris Niarchos	1–7
(United Kingdom) CRS Racing	Ferrari F430 GTC	Ferrari F136 4.0 L V8	M	55	(United Kingdom) Phil Quaife	4
(United Kingdom) CRS Racing	Ferrari F430 GTC	Ferrari F136 4.0 L V8	M	55	(United Kingdom) Chris Goodwin	4
(United Kingdom) CRS Racing	Ferrari F430 GTC	Ferrari F136 4.0 L V8	M	55	(Spain) Antonio García	8
(United Kingdom) CRS Racing	Ferrari F430 GTC	Ferrari F136 4.0 L V8	M	56	(United Kingdom) Andrew Kirkaldy	All
(United Kingdom) CRS Racing	Ferrari F430 GTC	Ferrari F136 4.0 L V8	M	56	(United Kingdom) Rob Bell	All
(United Kingdom) CRS Racing	Ferrari F430 GTC	Ferrari F136 4.0 L V8	M	56	(Spain) Antonio García	4
(United Kingdom) CRS Racing	Ferrari F430 GTC	Ferrari F136 4.0 L V8	M	56	(Netherlands) Peter Kox	4
(United Kingdom) Trackspeed Racing	Porsche 911 GT3 RSR	Porsche M97/77 3.8 L Flat-6; Porsche M97/74 4.0 L Flat-6	M	58	(United Kingdom) David Ashburn	8
(United Kingdom) Trackspeed Racing	Porsche 911 GT3 RSR	Porsche M97/77 3.8 L Flat-6; Porsche M97/74 4.0 L Flat-6	M	58	(Germany) Sascha Maassen	8
(United Kingdom) Trackspeed Racing	Porsche 911 GT3 RSR	Porsche M97/77 3.8 L Flat-6; Porsche M97/74 4.0 L Flat-6	M	59	(United Kingdom) David Ashburn	1–7
(United Kingdom) Trackspeed Racing	Porsche 911 GT3 RSR	Porsche M97/77 3.8 L Flat-6; Porsche M97/74 4.0 L Flat-6	M	59	(United Kingdom) Tim Sugden	1–2, 4–6
(United Kingdom) Trackspeed Racing	Porsche 911 GT3 RSR	Porsche M97/77 3.8 L Flat-6; Porsche M97/74 4.0 L Flat-6	M	59	(Germany) Jörg Bergmeister	3–4, 8
(United Kingdom) Trackspeed Racing	Porsche 911 GT3 RSR	Porsche M97/77 3.8 L Flat-6; Porsche M97/74 4.0 L Flat-6	M	59	(Monaco) Stéphane Ortelli	4
(United Kingdom) Trackspeed Racing	Porsche 911 GT3 RSR	Porsche M97/77 3.8 L Flat-6; Porsche M97/74 4.0 L Flat-6	M	59	(Germany) Sascha Maassen	7
(United Kingdom) Trackspeed Racing	Porsche 911 GT3 RSR	Porsche M97/77 3.8 L Flat-6; Porsche M97/74 4.0 L Flat-6	M	59	(Germany) Christian Mamerow	8
(Belgium) Prospeed Competition	Porsche 911 GT3 RSR	Porsche M97/77 3.8 L Flat-6; Porsche M97/74 4.0 L Flat-6	M	60	(United Kingdom) Richard Westbrook	All
(Belgium) Prospeed Competition	Porsche 911 GT3 RSR	Porsche M97/77 3.8 L Flat-6; Porsche M97/74 4.0 L Flat-6	M	60	(France) Emmanuel Collard	1–7
(Belgium) Prospeed Competition	Porsche 911 GT3 RSR	Porsche M97/77 3.8 L Flat-6; Porsche M97/74 4.0 L Flat-6	M	60	(United Kingdom) Sean Edwards	4
(Belgium) Prospeed Competition	Porsche 911 GT3 RSR	Porsche M97/77 3.8 L Flat-6; Porsche M97/74 4.0 L Flat-6	M	60	(Hong Kong) Darryl O'Young	4
(Belgium) Prospeed Competition	Porsche 911 GT3 RSR	Porsche M97/77 3.8 L Flat-6; Porsche M97/74 4.0 L Flat-6	M	60	(Germany) Marco Holzer	8
(Belgium) Prospeed Competition	Porsche 911 GT3 RSR	Porsche M97/77 3.8 L Flat-6; Porsche M97/74 4.0 L Flat-6	M	61	(Germany) Marco Holzer	1–3, 5–7
(Belgium) Prospeed Competition	Porsche 911 GT3 RSR	Porsche M97/77 3.8 L Flat-6; Porsche M97/74 4.0 L Flat-6	M	61	(Hong Kong) Darryl O'Young	1–2, 5–8
(Belgium) Prospeed Competition	Porsche 911 GT3 RSR	Porsche M97/77 3.8 L Flat-6; Porsche M97/74 4.0 L Flat-6	M	61	(United Kingdom) Sean Edwards	3
(Belgium) Prospeed Competition	Porsche 911 GT3 RSR	Porsche M97/77 3.8 L Flat-6; Porsche M97/74 4.0 L Flat-6	M	61	(Netherlands) Paul van Splunteren	4
(Belgium) Prospeed Competition	Porsche 911 GT3 RSR	Porsche M97/77 3.8 L Flat-6; Porsche M97/74 4.0 L Flat-6	M	61	(Netherlands) Raymond Coronel	4
(Belgium) Prospeed Competition	Porsche 911 GT3 RSR	Porsche M97/77 3.8 L Flat-6; Porsche M97/74 4.0 L Flat-6	M	61	(Netherlands) Niek Hommerson	4
(Belgium) Prospeed Competition	Porsche 911 GT3 RSR	Porsche M97/77 3.8 L Flat-6; Porsche M97/74 4.0 L Flat-6	M	61	(Belgium) Louis Machiels	4
(Belgium) Prospeed Competition	Porsche 911 GT3 RSR	Porsche M97/77 3.8 L Flat-6; Porsche M97/74 4.0 L Flat-6	M	61	(Germany) Marc Lieb	8
(France) IMSA Performance Matmut	Porsche 911 GT3 RSR	Porsche M97/74 4.0 L Flat-6	M	70	(France) Raymond Narac	4
(France) IMSA Performance Matmut	Porsche 911 GT3 RSR	Porsche M97/74 4.0 L Flat-6	M	70	(France) Patrick Pilet	4
(France) IMSA Performance Matmut	Porsche 911 GT3 RSR	Porsche M97/74 4.0 L Flat-6	M	70	(United States) Patrick Long	4
(Italy) BMS Scuderia Italia	Ferrari F430 GTC	Ferrari F136 4.0 L V8	M P	77	(Italy) Paolo Ruberti	All
(Italy) BMS Scuderia Italia	Ferrari F430 GTC	Ferrari F136 4.0 L V8	M P	77	(Italy) Matteo Malucelli	All
(Italy) BMS Scuderia Italia	Ferrari F430 GTC	Ferrari F136 4.0 L V8	M P	77	(Germany) Kenneth Heyer	4
(Italy) BMS Scuderia Italia	Ferrari F430 GTC	Ferrari F136 4.0 L V8	M P	77	(Italy) Diego Romanini	4
(Italy) BMS Scuderia Italia	Ferrari F430 GTC	Ferrari F136 4.0 L V8	M P	78	(Italy) Diego Romanini	1–3, 5–7
(Italy) BMS Scuderia Italia	Ferrari F430 GTC	Ferrari F136 4.0 L V8	M P	78	(Germany) Kenneth Heyer	1–3, 5
(Italy) BMS Scuderia Italia	Ferrari F430 GTC	Ferrari F136 4.0 L V8	M P	78	(Italy) Fabio Babini	4
(Italy) BMS Scuderia Italia	Ferrari F430 GTC	Ferrari F136 4.0 L V8	M P	78	(Italy) Christian Pescatori	4
(Italy) BMS Scuderia Italia	Ferrari F430 GTC	Ferrari F136 4.0 L V8	M P	78	(Italy) Marcello Zani	4
(Italy) BMS Scuderia Italia	Ferrari F430 GTC	Ferrari F136 4.0 L V8	M P	78	(Italy) Ettore Bonaldi	6-7
(Italy) BMS Scuderia Italia	Ferrari F430 GTC	Ferrari F136 4.0 L V8	M P	78	(Belgium) Stéphane Lémeret	8
(Italy) BMS Scuderia Italia	Ferrari F430 GTC	Ferrari F136 4.0 L V8	M P	78	(Italy) Luigi Lucchini	8
(France) Hexis Racing AMR	Aston Martin V8 Vantage GT2	Aston Martin AJ37 4.5 L V8	M	80	(Germany) Stefan Mücke	1, 3
(France) Hexis Racing AMR	Aston Martin V8 Vantage GT2	Aston Martin AJ37 4.5 L V8	M	80	(France) Frédéric Makowiecki	1, 3
(Argentina) Pecom Racing	Ferrari F430 GTC	Ferrari F136 4.0 L V8	M	95	(Argentina) Matías Russo	1, 3, 5–8
(Argentina) Pecom Racing	Ferrari F430 GTC	Ferrari F136 4.0 L V8	M	95	(Argentina) Luís Pérez Companc	1, 3, 5–8
(Argentina) Pecom Racing	Ferrari F430 GTC	Ferrari F136 4.0 L V8	M	95	(Monaco) Cédric Sbirrazzuoli	2, 4
(Argentina) Pecom Racing	Ferrari F430 GTC	Ferrari F136 4.0 L V8	M	95	(Italy) Francesco La Mazza	2
(Argentina) Pecom Racing	Ferrari F430 GTC	Ferrari F136 4.0 L V8	M	95	(Italy) Lorenzo Casè	4
(Italy) Brixia Racing	Porsche 911 GT3 RSR	Porsche M97/77 3.8 L Flat-6; Porsche M97/74 4.0 L Flat-6	M	97	(Austria) Martin Ragginger	All
(Italy) Brixia Racing	Porsche 911 GT3 RSR	Porsche M97/77 3.8 L Flat-6; Porsche M97/74 4.0 L Flat-6	M	97	(Italy) Luigi Lucchini	1-7
(Italy) Brixia Racing	Porsche 911 GT3 RSR	Porsche M97/77 3.8 L Flat-6; Porsche M97/74 4.0 L Flat-6	M	97	(Germany) Marco Holzer	4
(Italy) Brixia Racing	Porsche 911 GT3 RSR	Porsche M97/77 3.8 L Flat-6; Porsche M97/74 4.0 L Flat-6	M	97	(United States) Bryce Miller	4
(Italy) Brixia Racing	Porsche 911 GT3 RSR	Porsche M97/77 3.8 L Flat-6; Porsche M97/74 4.0 L Flat-6	M	97	(France) Emmanuel Collard	8
(Monaco) JMB Racing	Ferrari F430 GTC	Ferrari F136 4.0 L V8	M	99	(Switzerland) Maurizio Basso	4
(Monaco) JMB Racing	Ferrari F430 GTC	Ferrari F136 4.0 L V8	M	99	(Netherlands) Peter Kutemann	4
(Monaco) JMB Racing	Ferrari F430 GTC	Ferrari F136 4.0 L V8	M	99	(United Kingdom) John Hartshorne	4
(Monaco) JMB Racing	Ferrari F430 GTC	Ferrari F136 4.0 L V8	M	99	(France) Stéphane Daoudi	4

== Season results ==
Overall winners in bold.

Rnd	Circuit	GT1 Winning Team	GT2 Winning Team	Results
Rnd	Circuit	GT1 Winning Drivers	GT2 Winning Drivers	Results
1	Silverstone	**(Czech Republic) No. 14 K plus K Motorsport**	(Belgium) No. 60 Prospeed Competition	Results
1	Silverstone	(Austria) **Karl Wendlinger** (United Kingdom) **Ryan Sharp**	(United Kingdom) Richard Westbrook (France) Emmanuel Collard	Results
2	Adria	**(Germany) No. 1 Vitaphone Racing Team**	(Belgium) No. 60 Prospeed Competition	Results
2	Adria	(Germany) **Michael Bartels** (Italy) **Andrea Bertolini**	(United Kingdom) Richard Westbrook (France) Emmanuel Collard	Results
3	Oschersleben	**(Belgium) No. 4 PK Carsport**	(Italy) No. 50 AF Corse	Results
3	Oschersleben	(Netherlands) **Mike Hezemans** (Belgium) **Anthony Kumpen**	(Finland) Toni Vilander (Italy) Gianmaria Bruni	Results
4	Spa	**(Belgium) No. 4 PK Carsport**	(Italy) No. 50 AF Corse	Results
4	Spa	(Netherlands) **Mike Hezemans** (Belgium) **Anthony Kumpen** (Netherlands) **Jos Menten** (Belgium) **Kurt Mollekens**	(Finland) Toni Vilander (Italy) Gianmaria Bruni (Brazil) Jaime Melo (Argentina) Luís Pérez Companc	Results
5	Hungaroring	**(Germany) No. 1 Vitaphone Racing Team**	(Belgium) No. 60 Prospeed Competition	Results
5	Hungaroring	(Germany) **Michael Bartels** (Italy) **Andrea Bertolini**	(United Kingdom) Richard Westbrook (France) Emmanuel Collard	Results
6	Algarve	**(Belgium) No. 3 Selleslagh Racing Team**	(Italy) No. 51 AF Corse	Results
6	Algarve	(Belgium) **Bert Longin** (France) **James Ruffier**	(Italy) Niki Cadei (Spain) Álvaro Barba	Results
7	Paul Ricard	**No. 8 Sangari Team Brazil**	(Italy) No. 50 AF Corse	Results
7	Paul Ricard	(Brazil) **Enrique Bernoldi** (Brazil) **Roberto Streit**	(Finland) Toni Vilander (Italy) Gianmaria Bruni	Results
8	Zolder	**(Germany) No. 33 Vitaphone Racing Team DHL**	(Belgium) No. 60 Prospeed Competition	Results
8	Zolder	(Italy) **Alessandro Pier Guidi** (Italy) **Matteo Bobbi**	(United Kingdom) Richard Westbrook (Germany) Marco Holzer	Results

== Championships ==
Points were awarded to the top eight finishers in the order of 10–8–6–5–4–3–2–1. Cars which failed to complete 75% of the winner's distance were not awarded points. Drivers who did not drive for at least 35 minutes do not receive points.

=== Driver championships ===
==== GT1 standings ====
Pos.	Driver	Team	SIL (United Kingdom)	ADR (Italy)	OSC (Germany)	SPA (Belgium)	BUD (Hungary)	ALG (Portugal)	PAU (France)	ZOL (Belgium)	Total points
1	(Germany) Michael Bartels	(Germany) Vitaphone Racing Team	2	1	2	4	1	5	5	3	55
1	(Italy) Andrea Bertolini	(Germany) Vitaphone Racing Team	2	1	2	4	1	5	5	3	55
2	(Belgium) Anthony Kumpen	(Belgium) PekaRacing nv	4	2	1	1	5	2	Ret	2	53
2	(Netherlands) Mike Hezemans	(Belgium) PekaRacing nv	4	2	1	1	5	2	Ret	2	53
3	(Belgium) Bert Longin	(Belgium) Selleslagh Racing Team	6	5	4	5	6	1	3	6	38
3	(France) James Ruffier	(Belgium) Selleslagh Racing Team	6	5	4	5	6	1	3	6	38
4	(Netherlands) Xavier Maassen	(France) Luc Alphand Aventures	3	4	5		4		4	4	35
4	(Netherlands) Xavier Maassen	Sangari Team Brazil				Ret		4			35
5	(Italy) Alessandro Pier Guidi	(Germany) Vitaphone Racing Team DHL				2	2	6	6	1	32
6	(Portugal) Miguel Ramos	(Germany) Vitaphone Racing Team	Ret	3	3	6	Ret	3	2	7	31
6	(Germany) Alex Müller	(Germany) Vitaphone Racing Team	Ret	3	3	6	Ret	3	2	7	31
7	(Brazil) Enrique Bernoldi	Sangari Team Brazil				Ret	3	4	1	5	25
7	(Brazil) Roberto Streit	Sangari Team Brazil				Ret	3	4	1	5	25
8	(Italy) Matteo Bobbi	(Germany) Vitaphone Racing Team DHL					2	6	6	1	24
9	(Italy) Thomas Biagi	(Switzerland) Matech GT Racing	8	9							20
9	(Italy) Thomas Biagi	(France) Luc Alphand Aventures			5		4		4	4	20
10	(Belgium) Stéphane Lémeret	(Austria) Full Speed Racing	9	6	8		Ret	8			13
10	(Belgium) Stéphane Lémeret	(Germany) Vitaphone Racing Team DHL				2					13
11	(Netherlands) Jos Menten	(Luxembourg) DKR Engineering	7								12
11	(Netherlands) Jos Menten	(Belgium) PekaRacing nv				1					12
12	(France) Guillaume Moreau	(France) Luc Alphand Aventures	3	4							11
13	(Austria) Karl Wendlinger	(Czech Republic) K plus K Motorsport	1	Ret	10		DSQ				10
13	(United Kingdom) Ryan Sharp	(Czech Republic) K plus K Motorsport	1	Ret	10		DSQ				10
14	(Belgium) Kurt Mollekens	(Belgium) PekaRacing nv				1					10
15	(Belgium) Renaud Kuppens	(Belgium) Marc VDS Racing Team	10	7	6	NC	7	7	9	Ret	9
15	(Belgium) Bas Leinders	(Belgium) Marc VDS Racing Team	10	7	6	NC	7	7	9	Ret	9
16	(Belgium) Vincent Vosse	(Germany) Vitaphone Racing Team DHL				2					8
16	(Sweden) Carl Rosenblad	(Germany) Vitaphone Racing Team DHL				2					8
17	(Czech Republic) Adam Lacko	(Czech Republic) K plus K Motorsport	5	8	Ret		8				6
18	(France) Stéphane Sarrazin	(Germany) Vitaphone Racing Team				4					5
18	(Brazil) Alexandre Negrão	(Germany) Vitaphone Racing Team				4					5
19	(Mexico) Mario Domínguez	(Czech Republic) K plus K Motorsport	5	8	Ret						5
20	(United Kingdom) Luke Hines	(Austria) Full Speed Racing	9	6	8		Ret	8			5
21	(Belgium) Maxime Soulet	(Belgium) Selleslagh Racing Team				5					4
21	(United Kingdom) Oliver Gavin	(Belgium) Selleslagh Racing Team				5					4
22	(Germany) Thomas Mutsch	(Switzerland) Matech GT Racing	8	9	7		9		8		4
23	(Belgium) Eric van de Poele	(Germany) Vitaphone Racing Team				6					3
23	(Portugal) Pedro Lamy	(Germany) Vitaphone Racing Team				6					3
24	(Finland) Markus Palttala	(Luxembourg) DKR Engineering	7								2
24	(Germany) Marc Hennerici	(Switzerland) Matech GT Racing			7						2
24	(France) Ange Barde	(France) Solution F							7		2
24	(France) Olivier Panis	(France) Solution F							7		2
25	(Sweden) Max Nilsson	(Czech Republic) K plus K Motorsport					8				1
25	(Switzerland) Henri Moser	(Switzerland) Matech GT Racing							8		1
Pos.	Driver	Team	SIL (United Kingdom)	ADR (Italy)	OSC (Germany)	SPA (Belgium)	BUD (Hungary)	ALG (Portugal)	PAU (France)	ZOL (Belgium)	Total points

Colour	Result
Gold	Winner
Silver	Second place
Bronze	Third place
Green	Points classification
Blue	Non-points classification
Blue	Non-classified finish (NC)
Purple	Retired, not classified (Ret)
Red	Did not qualify (DNQ)
Red	Did not pre-qualify (DNPQ)
Black	Disqualified (DSQ)
White	Did not start (DNS)
White	Withdrew (WD)
White	Race cancelled (C)
Blank	Did not practice (DNP)
Blank	Did not arrive (DNA)
Blank	Excluded (EX)

==== GT2 standings ====
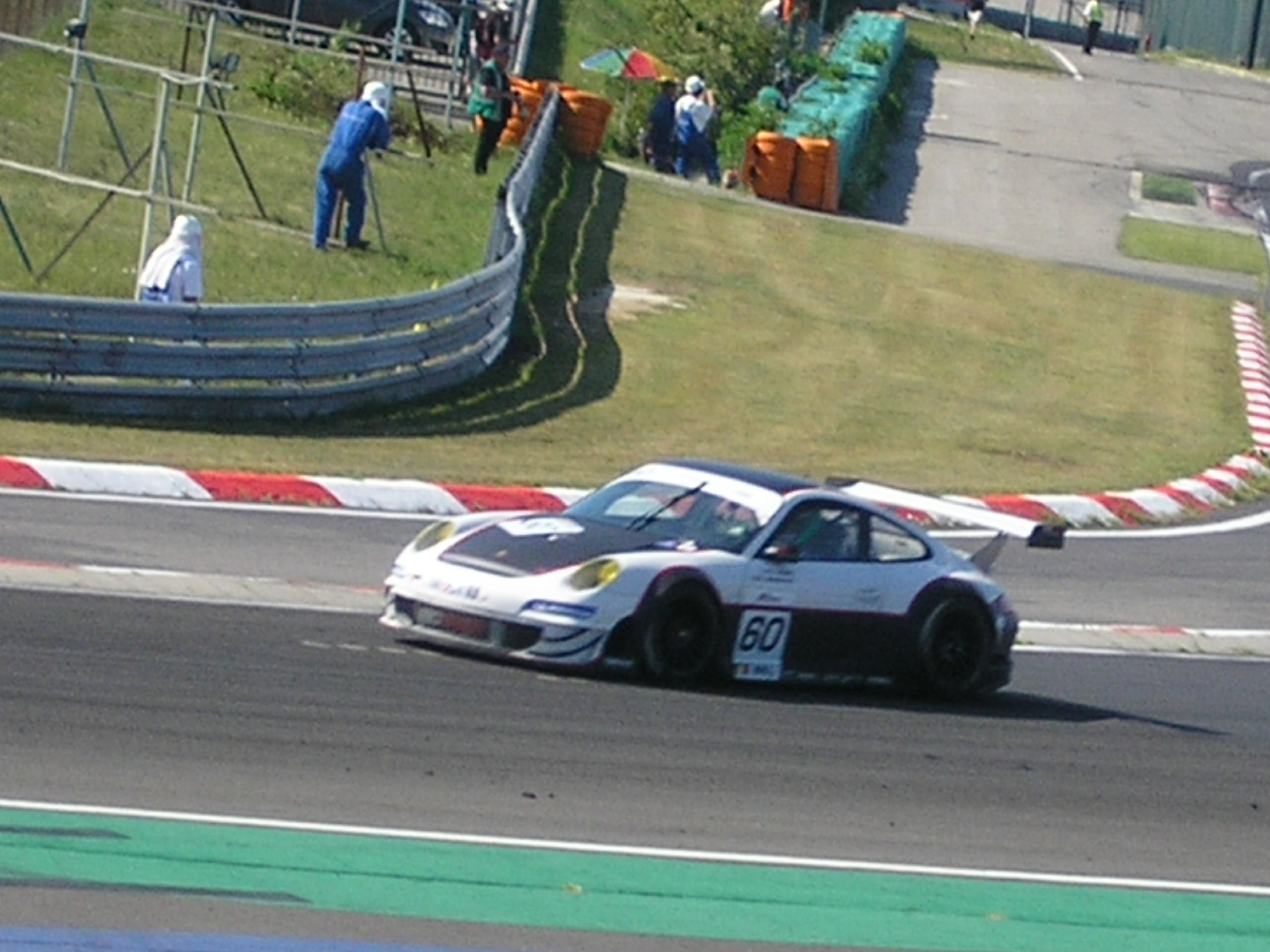
Richard Westbrook won the GT2 Cup for Drivers

Pos.	Driver	Team	SIL (United Kingdom)	ADR (Italy)	OSC (Germany)	SPA (Belgium)	BUD (Hungary)	ALG (Portugal)	PAU (France)	ZOL (Belgium)	Total points
1	(United Kingdom) Richard Westbrook	(Belgium) Prospeed Competition	1	1	Ret	DSQ	1	2	2	1	56
2	(Italy) Gianmaria Bruni	(Italy) AF Corse	11	2	1	1	2	6	1	4	54
2	(Finland) Toni Vilander	(Italy) AF Corse	11	2	1	1	2	6	1	4	54
3	(France) Emmanuel Collard	(Belgium) Prospeed Competition	1	1	Ret	DSQ	1	2	2		49
3	(France) Emmanuel Collard	(Italy) Brixia Racing								6	49
4	(Spain) Álvaro Barba	(Italy) AF Corse	5	3	7	Ret	5	1	3	7	34
4	(Italy) Niki Cadei	(Italy) AF Corse	5	3	7	Ret	5	1	3	7	34
5	(United Kingdom) Rob Bell	(United Kingdom) CRS Racing	3	7	5	2	6	5	8	3	34
5	(United Kingdom) Andrew Kirkaldy	(United Kingdom) CRS Racing	3	7	5	2	6	5	8	3	34
6	(Argentina) Luís Pérez Companc	(Argentina) Pecom Racing	2		Ret		7	4	4	10	30
6	(Argentina) Luís Pérez Companc	(Italy) AF Corse				1					30
7	(Italy) Paolo Ruberti	(Italy) BMS Scuderia Italia	4	10	Ret	Ret	3	3	7	2	27
7	(Italy) Matteo Malucelli	(Italy) BMS Scuderia Italia	4	10	Ret	Ret	3	3	7	2	27
8	(Germany) Marco Holzer	(Belgium) Prospeed Competition	6	4	DSQ		4	Ret	DSQ	1	23
8	(Germany) Marco Holzer	(Italy) Brixia Racing				DSQ					23
9	(United Kingdom) Tim Mullen	(United Kingdom) CRS Racing	9	6	3	3	8	8	5	Ret	21
9	(Canada) Chris Niarchos	(United Kingdom) CRS Racing	9	6	3	3	8	8	5		21
10	(Argentina) Matías Russo	(Argentina) Pecom Racing	2		Ret		7	4	4	10	20
10	(Argentina) Matías Russo	(Italy) AF Corse				Ret					20
11	(Austria) Martin Ragginger	(Italy) Brixia Racing	8	5	4	DSQ	9	7	6	6	18
12	(Italy) Luigi Lucchini	(Italy) Brixia Racing	8	5	4	DSQ	9	7	6		15
12	(Italy) Luigi Lucchini	(Italy) BMS Scuderia Italia								Ret	15
13	(Hong Kong) Darryl O'Young	(Belgium) Prospeed Competition	6	4		DSQ	4	Ret	DSQ	8	14
14	(Brazil) Jaime Melo	(Italy) AF Corse				1					10
15	(France) Frédéric Makowiecki	(France) Hexis Racing AMR	7		2						10
15	(Germany) Stefan Mücke	(France) Hexis Racing AMR	7		2						10
16	(Spain) Antonio García	(United Kingdom) CRS Racing				2				Ret	8
16	(Netherlands) Peter Kox	(United Kingdom) CRS Racing				2					8
17	(Germany) Jörg Bergmeister	(United Kingdom) Trackspeed Racing			6	DSQ				5	7
18	(United Kingdom) Phil Quaife	(United Kingdom) CRS Racing				3					6
18	(United Kingdom) Chris Goodwin	(United Kingdom) CRS Racing				3					6
19	(Switzerland) Maurizio Basso	(Monaco) JMB Racing				4					5
19	(Netherlands) Peter Kutemann	(Monaco) JMB Racing				4					5
19	(United Kingdom) John Hartshone	(Monaco) JMB Racing				4					5
19	(France) Stéphane Daoudi	(Monaco) JMB Racing				4					5
20	(Germany) Christian Mamerow	(United Kingdom) Trackspeed Racing								5	4
21	(United Kingdom) David Ashburn	(United Kingdom) Trackspeed Racing	Ret	8	6	DSQ	11	10	9	9	4
22	(Italy) Diego Romanini	(Italy) BMS Scuderia Italia	10	9	8	Ret	10	9	Ret		1
23	(Germany) Kenneth Heyer	(Italy) BMS Scuderia Italia	10	9	8	Ret	10				1
24	(United Kingdom) Tim Sugden	(United Kingdom) Trackspeed Racing	Ret	8		DSQ	11	10			1
25	(Germany) Marc Lieb	(Belgium) Prospeed Competition								8	1
Pos.	Driver	Team	SIL (United Kingdom)	ADR (Italy)	OSC (Germany)	SPA (Belgium)	BUD (Hungary)	ALG (Portugal)	PAU (France)	ZOL (Belgium)	Total points

==== Citation Cup ====
New for 2009, the Citation Cup involved amateur drivers in the GT2 category rather than the GT1 category used since 2007. Drivers rated as bronze by the GT Bureau driver classification system were allowed to enter the Citation Cup if they competed in a car which was homologated before 2009. Points in the Citation Cup were awarded at every FIA GT round except for the Spa 24 Hours.

Pos	Driver	Team	Rd 1	Rd 2	Rd 3	Rd 4	Rd 5	Rd 6	Rd 7	Rd 8	Total
1	(Canada) Chris Niarchos	(United Kingdom) CRS Racing	8	10	10		8	8	8		52
2	(Argentina) Luís Pérez Companc	(Argentina) Pecom Racing Team	10		0		10	10	10	8	48
3	(United Kingdom) David Ashburn	(United Kingdom) Trackspeed Racing	0	8	8		6	6	6	10	44
4	(France) Jean-Claude Lagniez	(France) Red Racing	6								6

=== Team championships ===
==== GT1 standings ====
The Nissan Motorsports entry was not allowed to score championship points due to being run as a factory team.

Pos.	Team	SIL (United Kingdom)	ADR (Italy)	OSC (Germany)	SPA (Belgium)	BUD (Hungary)	ALG (Portugal)	PAU (France)	ZOL (Belgium)	Total points
1	(Germany) Vitaphone Racing Team	2	1	2	4	1	3	2	3	86
1	(Germany) Vitaphone Racing Team	Ret	3	3	6	Ret	5	5	7	86
2	(Belgium) PekaRacing nv	4	2	1	1	5	2	Ret	2	53
3	(Belgium) Selleslagh Racing Team	6	5	4	5	6	1	3	6	38
4	(Germany) Vitaphone Racing Team DHL				2	2	6	6	1	32
5	(France) Luc Alphand Aventures	3	4	5		4		4	4	30
6	Sangari Team Brazil				Ret	3	4	1	5	25
7	(Czech Republic) K plus K Motorsport	1	8	10		8				16
7	(Czech Republic) K plus K Motorsport	5	Ret	Ret		DSQ				16
8	(Belgium) Marc VDS Racing Team	10	7	6	NC	7	7	9	Ret	9
9	(Austria) Full Speed Racing	9	6	8	Ret	Ret	8			5
9	(Austria) Full Speed Racing	Ret	Ret	Ret						5
10	(Switzerland) Matech GT Racing	8	9	7		9		8		4
11	(Luxembourg) DKR Engineering	7								2
11	(France) Solution F							7		2

Colour	Result
Gold	Winner
Silver	Second place
Bronze	Third place
Green	Points classification
Blue	Non-points classification
Blue	Non-classified finish (NC)
Purple	Retired, not classified (Ret)
Red	Did not qualify (DNQ)
Red	Did not pre-qualify (DNPQ)
Black	Disqualified (DSQ)
White	Did not start (DNS)
White	Withdrew (WD)
White	Race cancelled (C)
Blank	Did not practice (DNP)
Blank	Did not arrive (DNA)
Blank	Excluded (EX)

==== GT2 standings ====
Pos.	Team	SIL (United Kingdom)	ADR (Italy)	OSC (Germany)	SPA (Belgium)	BUD (Hungary)	ALG (Portugal)	PAU (France)	ZOL (Belgium)	Total points
1	(Italy) AF Corse	5	2	1	1	2	1	1	4	88
1	(Italy) AF Corse	11	3	7	Ret	5	6	3	7	88
2	(Belgium) Prospeed Competition	1	1	DSQ	DSQ	1	2	2	1	70
2	(Belgium) Prospeed Competition	6	4	Ret	DSQ	4	Ret	DSQ	8	70
3	(United Kingdom) CRS Racing	3	6	3	2	6	5	5	3	55
3	(United Kingdom) CRS Racing	9	7	5	3	8	8	8	Ret	55
4	(Italy) BMS Scuderia Italia	4	9	8	Ret	3	3	7	2	28
4	(Italy) BMS Scuderia Italia	10	10	Ret	Ret	10	9	Ret	Ret	28
5	(Argentina) Pecom Racing	2	Ret	Ret	Ret	7	4	4	10	20
6	(Italy) Brixia Racing	8	5	4	DSQ	9	7	6	6	18
7	(France) Hexis Racing AMR	7		2						10
8	(United Kingdom) Trackspeed Racing	Ret	8	6	DSQ	11	10	9	5	8
8	(United Kingdom) Trackspeed Racing								9	8
9	(Monaco) JMB Racing				4					5
–	(France) IMSA Performance Matmut				DSQ					0

=== Manufacturers Cups ===
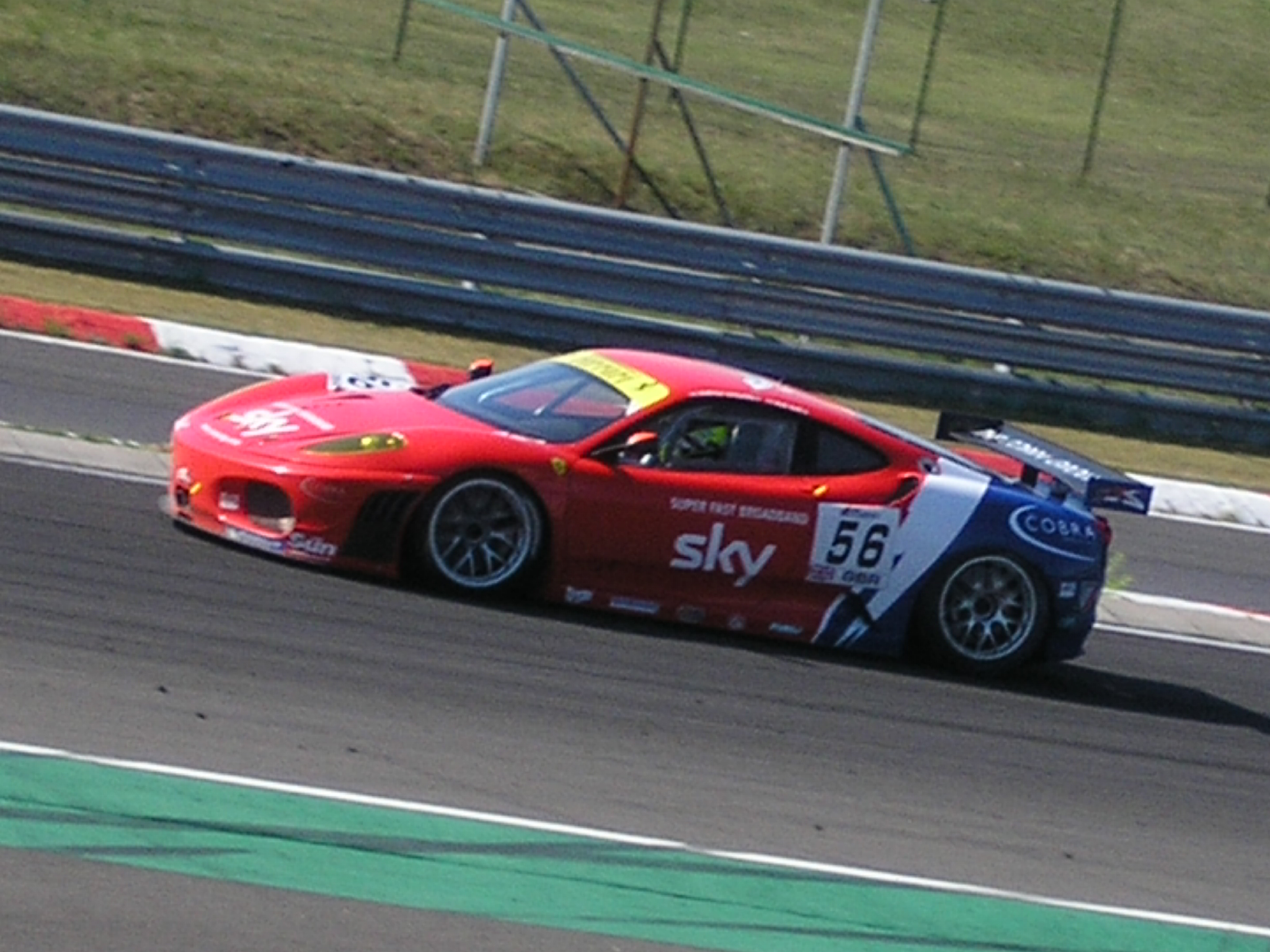
Ferrari won the GT2 Manufacturers' Cup

Results of the GT2 Manufacturers’ Cup were as follows. Although a GT1 Manufacturers’ Cup was listed in the Sporting Regulations for the 2009 FIA GT Championship, no points table for this award was published. An award was given only for the manufacturers in the GT2 category.

Pos	Manufacturer	Rd 1	Rd 2	Rd 3	Rd 4	Rd 5	Rd 6	Rd 7	Rd 8	Total
1	(Italy) Ferrari	23	19	22	19	21	0	25	21	150
2	(Germany) Porsche	14	20	8	19	15	0	11	18	105
3	(United Kingdom) Aston Martin	2		8						10

== Bibliography ==
- Loisy, Olivier (2009). FIA GT & GT3 European Championship 2009 Yearbook. Paris: Apollo Publishing. ISBN 978-2952104463.
