= 2009 Budapest City Challenge =

Layout of the Hungaroring

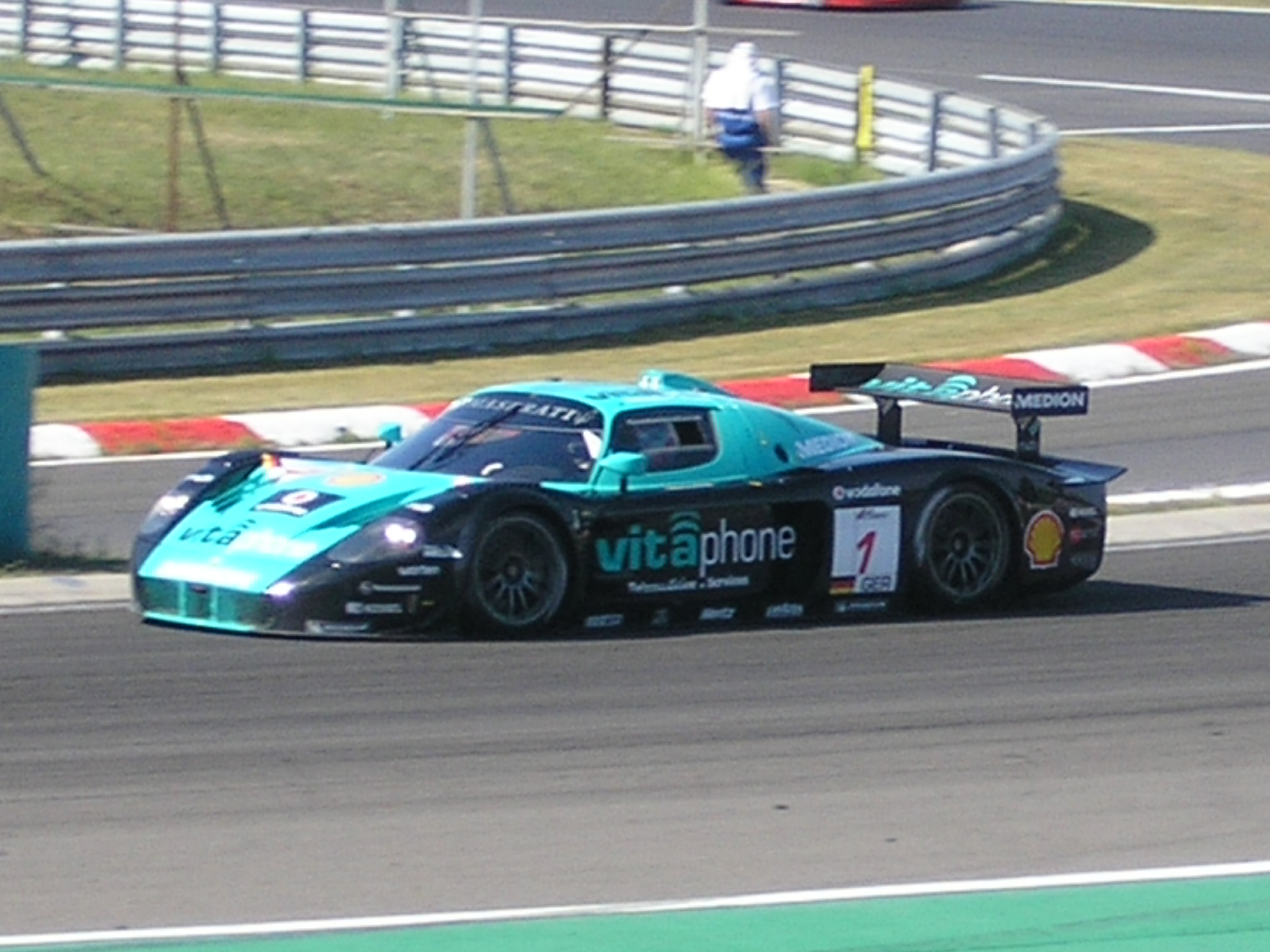
The winning Maserati MC12 of Michael Bartels and Andrea Bertolini

The 2009 Budapest City Challenge was the fifth round of the 2009 FIA GT Championship season and was organised by City Challenge GmbH. It took place at the Hungaroring, Hungary on 30 August 2009. Michael Bartels and Andrea Bertolini won for the Vitaphone Racing Team Maserati after the disqualification of the K plus K Motorsport Saleen. Richard Westbrook and Emmanuel Collard of Prospeed Competition won in the GT2 category by passing the AF Corse Ferrari on the final lap of the event.

== Report ==
=== Qualifying ===
Qualifying was led by the No. 2 Vitaphone Maserati of driver Alex Müller who recorded a lap time over a tenth of a second faster than Karl Wendlinger in the K plus K Saleen. Enrique Bernoldi, in only his second FIA GT event, qualified the Sangari Corvette on the second row alongside the third Vitaphone Maserati.

The GT2 category was led by the No. 60 Prospeed Porsche of Richard Westbrook at the end of the qualifying session but Westbrook later had his lap times excluded after the Porsche failed a stall test during technical inspection. This promoted Álvaro Barba of No. 51 AF Corse Ferrari to his first pole position, followed by Tim Mullen's CRS Racing Ferrari. Westbrook's exclusion demoted the Prospeed Porsche to 24th and last on the grid.

==== Qualifying results ====
Class winners are highlighted in bold.

Pos	Class	Team	Driver	Lap Time	Grid
1	**GT1**	**No. 2 Vitaphone Racing Team**	**Alex Müller**	**1:41.815**	**1**
2	GT1	No. 14 K plus K Motorsport	Karl Wendlinger	1:41.929	2
3	GT1	No. 8 Sangari Team Brazil	Enrique Bernoldi	1:42.166	3
4	GT1	No. 33 Vitaphone Racing Team DHL	Alessandro Pier Guidi	1:42.375	4
5	GT1	No. 19 Luc Alphand Aventures	Xavier Maassen	1:42.563	5
6	GT1	No. 1 Vitaphone Racing Team	Andrea Bertolini	1:42.870	6
7	GT1	No. 4 PK Carsport	Mike Hezemans	1:43.255	7
8	GT1	No. 3 Selleslagh Racing Team	Bert Longin	1:43.520	8
9	GT1	No. 18 K plus K Motorsport	Adam Lacko	1:44.092	9
10	GT1	No. 11 Full Speed Racing Team	Stéphane Lémeret	1:44.551	10
11	**G2**	**No. 112 Autoracing Club Bratislava**	**Andrej Studenic**	**1:45.399**	**11**
12	GT1	No. 44 Matech GT Racing	Thomas Mutsch	1:45.580	12
13	GT1	No. 40 Marc VDS Racing Team	Renaud Kuppens	1:46.545	13
14	GT2	No. 60 Prospeed Competition	Richard Westbrook	1:47.043	24^{†}
15	**GT2**	**No. 51 AF Corse**	**Álvaro Barba**	**1:47.262**	**14**
16	GT2	No. 55 CRS Racing	Tim Mullen	1:47.347	15
17	GT2	No. 50 AF Corse	Gianmaria Bruni	1:47.405	16
18	GT2	No. 97 Brixia Motorsport	Martin Ragginger	1:47.683	17
19	GT2	No. 77 BMS Scuderia Italia	Paolo Ruberti	1:47.797	18
20	GT2	No. 95 PeCom Racing Team	Matías Russo	1:47.866	19
21	GT2	No. 59 Trackspeed Racing	Tim Sugden	1:47.884	20
22	GT2	No. 56 CRS Racing	Andrew Kirkaldy	1:47.890	21
23	GT2	No. 61 Prospeed Competition	Darryl O'Young	1:48.067	22
24	GT2	No. 78 BMS Scuderia Italia	Diego Romanini	1:50.599	23

† – The No. 60 Prospeed Competition Porsche had its qualifying times disallowed after the car failed post-qualifying technical inspection. The No. 51 AF Corse Ferrari took over GT2 pole position.

=== Race ===
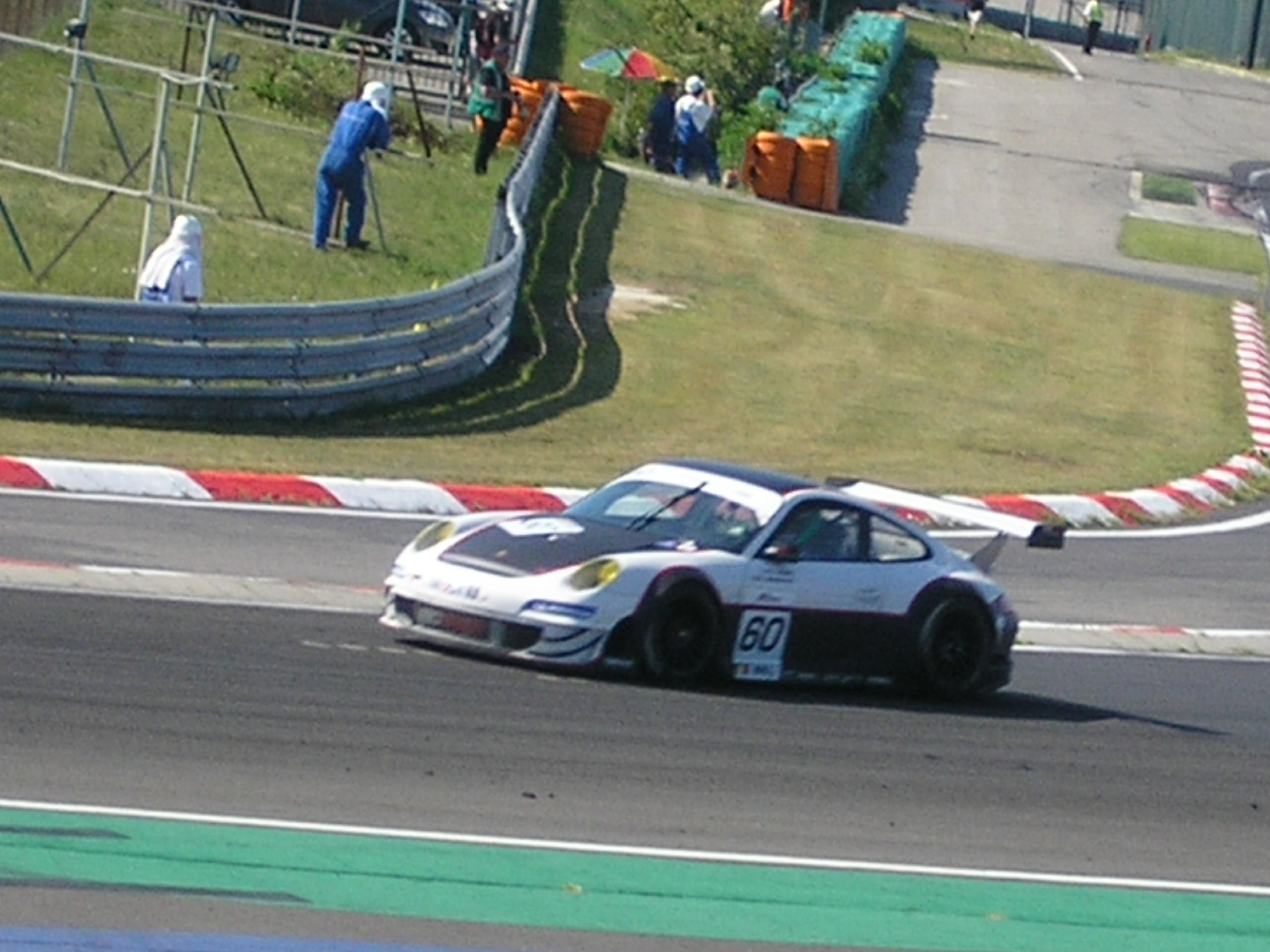
The winning GT2 class Porsche of Richard Westbrook and Emmanuel Collard

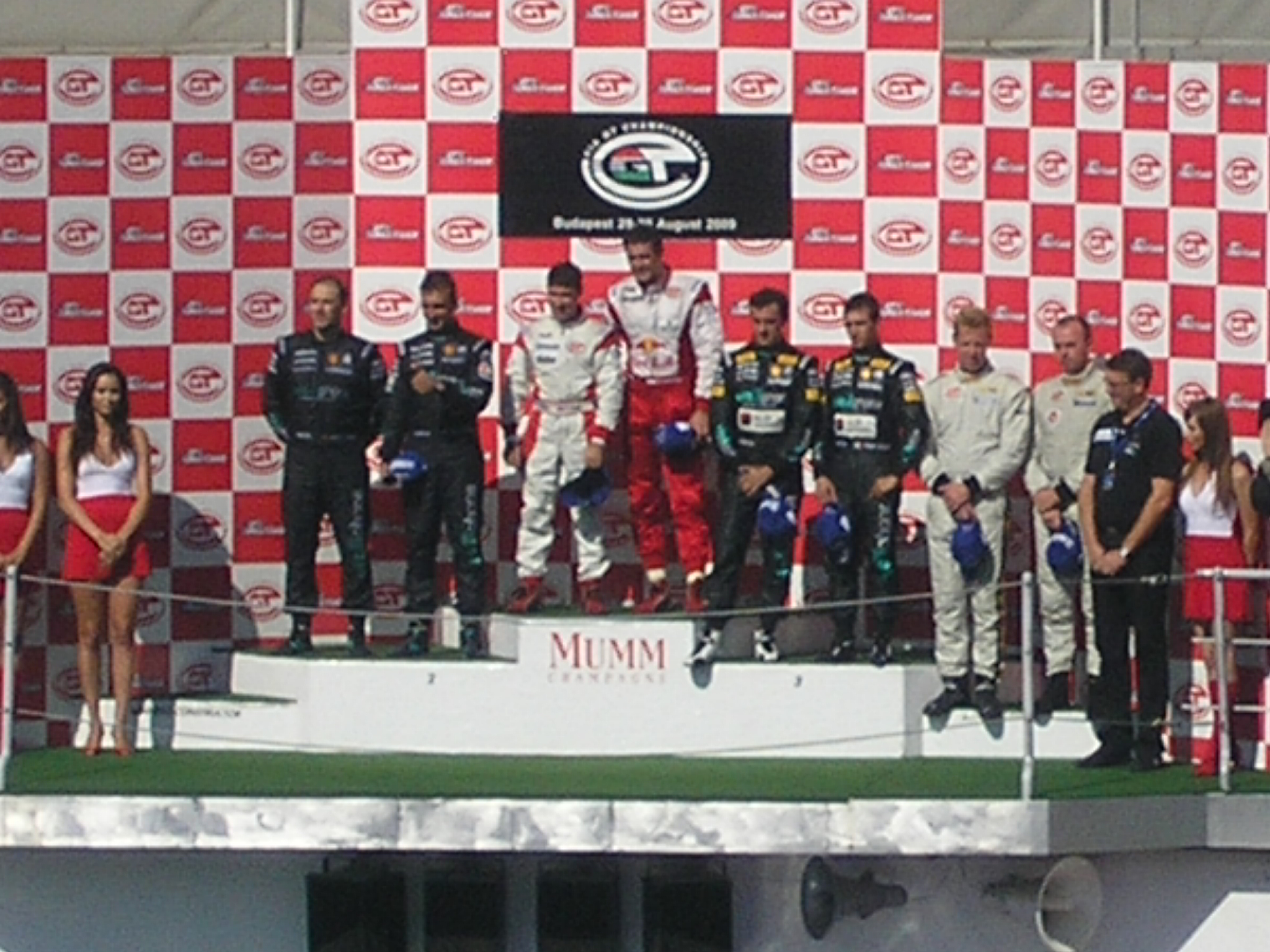
The overall podium immediately after the race but prior to the exclusion of Karl Wendlinger and Ryan Sharp

The race was led into the first turn by Enrique Bernoldi's Sangari Corvette which managed to jump from the third place grid position to first, followed by Karl Wendlinger's No. 14 K plus K Saleen and the No. 2 and No. 33 Vitaphone Maseratis. The four held this position in the early laps but Alex Müller in the No. 2 car braked too late for the first turn at the start of the fourth lap and jumped the inside kerbs before impacting the leading Corvette and spinning in front of the second place Saleen. This allowed the No. 33 Vitaphone car into second but Bernoldi continued to lead despite the damaged car.

This damage would however hamper the Corvette as the first pit stops took place and the Sangari Team Brazil crew had difficulties refueling the car. The No. 1 Maserati inherited the lead following its pit stop but had to relinquish it after the team was penalized for speeding in the pit lane. This allowed the No. 14 Saleen, now driven by Ryan Sharp, to take the lead which it held until the second round of pit stops where the No. 33 Maserati took over at the front of the field. Karl Wendlinger returned to the cockpit and was able to overcome the deficit and retake the lead from the Maserati in the last ten minutes of the race. On the final lap the No. 33 was passed by the No. 1 team car to complete the podium.

In the GT2 category the No. 97 Brixia Racing Porsche of Martin Ragginger led the field at the end of the first lap after passing the three Ferraris which had qualified ahead of it. The Porsche however made its first pit stop earlier than the rest of the GT2 competitors and allowed the No. 50 AF Corse Ferrari to lead the class. The No. 60 Prospeed Porsche of Richard Westbrook and Emmanuel Collard, which had started from last on the grid, was able to climb through the GT2 field and eventually challenge AF Corse's Gianmaria Bruni in the latter half of the race. Westbrook was able to outbrake Bruni's Ferrari entering the first turn of the final lap and hold the lead for the rest of the lap. The No. 77 BMS Scuderia Italia Ferrari completed the GT2 podium.

Following the race the No. 14 K Plus K Motorsports Saleen was excluded from the race after the car failed post-race technical inspection. The car's engine did not stall as required when its air restrictors were blocked. This promoted Bartels and Bertolini to the race win as well as Enrique Bernoldi and Roberto Streit to their first GT1 podium. Müller was also penalized after the race for avoidable contact when he collided with the No. 8 Corvette and No. 14 Saleen, earning a five grid spot penalty for the No. 2 Vitaphone Maserati at the next FIA GT event.

==== Race result ====
Class winners in bold. Cars failing to complete 75% of winner's distance are marked as Not Classified (NC).

Pos	Class	No	Team	Drivers	Chassis	Tyre	Laps
Pos	Class	No	Team	Drivers	Engine	Tyre	Laps
1	**GT1**	**1**	**(Germany) Vitaphone Racing Team**	**(Germany) Michael Bartels (Italy) Andrea Bertolini**	**Maserati MC12 GT1**	MI	**67**
1	**GT1**	**1**	**(Germany) Vitaphone Racing Team**	**(Germany) Michael Bartels (Italy) Andrea Bertolini**	**Maserati M144B/2 6.0 L V12**	MI	**67**
2	GT1	33	(Germany) Vitaphone Racing Team DHL	(Italy) Alessandro Pier Guidi (Italy) Matteo Bobbi	Maserati MC12 GT1	MI	67
2	GT1	33	(Germany) Vitaphone Racing Team DHL	(Italy) Alessandro Pier Guidi (Italy) Matteo Bobbi	Maserati M144B/2 6.0 L V12	MI	67
3	GT1	8	Sangari Team Brazil	(Brazil) Enrique Bernoldi (Brazil) Roberto Streit	Chevrolet Corvette C6.R	MI	67
3	GT1	8	Sangari Team Brazil	(Brazil) Enrique Bernoldi (Brazil) Roberto Streit	Chevrolet LS7.R 7.0 L V8	MI	67
4	GT1	19	(France) Luc Alphand Aventures	(Netherlands) Xavier Maassen (Italy) Thomas Biagi	Chevrolet Corvette C6.R	MI	67
4	GT1	19	(France) Luc Alphand Aventures	(Netherlands) Xavier Maassen (Italy) Thomas Biagi	Chevrolet LS7.R 7.0 L V8	MI	67
5	GT1	4	(Belgium) PK Carsport	(Belgium) Anthony Kumpen (Netherlands) Mike Hezemans	Chevrolet Corvette C6.R	MI	67
5	GT1	4	(Belgium) PK Carsport	(Belgium) Anthony Kumpen (Netherlands) Mike Hezemans	Chevrolet LS7.R 7.0 L V8	MI	67
6	GT1	3	(Belgium) Selleslagh Racing Team	(Belgium) Bert Longin (France) James Ruffier	Chevrolet Corvette C6.R	MI	66
6	GT1	3	(Belgium) Selleslagh Racing Team	(Belgium) Bert Longin (France) James Ruffier	Chevrolet LS7.R 7.0 L V8	MI	66
7	**GT2**	**60**	**(Belgium) Prospeed Competition**	**(France) Emmanuel Collard (United Kingdom) Richard Westbrook**	**Porsche 997 GT3-RSR**	MI	**65**
7	**GT2**	**60**	**(Belgium) Prospeed Competition**	**(France) Emmanuel Collard (United Kingdom) Richard Westbrook**	**Porsche M97/74 4.0 L Flat-6**	MI	**65**
8	GT2	50	(Italy) AF Corse	(Italy) Gianmaria Bruni (Finland) Toni Vilander	Ferrari F430 GT2	MI	65
8	GT2	50	(Italy) AF Corse	(Italy) Gianmaria Bruni (Finland) Toni Vilander	Ferrari F136 4.0 L V8	MI	65
9	GT2	77	(Italy) BMS Scuderia Italia	(Italy) Paolo Ruberti (Italy) Matteo Malucelli	Ferrari F430 GT2	P	65
9	GT2	77	(Italy) BMS Scuderia Italia	(Italy) Paolo Ruberti (Italy) Matteo Malucelli	Ferrari F136 4.0 L V8	P	65
10	GT1	40	(Belgium) Marc VDS Racing Team	(Belgium) Renaud Kuppens (Belgium) Bas Leinders	Ford GT1	MI	65
10	GT1	40	(Belgium) Marc VDS Racing Team	(Belgium) Renaud Kuppens (Belgium) Bas Leinders	Ford Cammer 5.0 L V8	MI	65
11	GT2	61	(Belgium) Prospeed Competition	(Germany) Marco Holzer (Hong Kong) Darryl O'Young	Porsche 997 GT3-RSR	MI	65
11	GT2	61	(Belgium) Prospeed Competition	(Germany) Marco Holzer (Hong Kong) Darryl O'Young	Porsche M97/74 4.0 L Flat-6	MI	65
12	GT2	51	(Italy) AF Corse	(Spain) Álvaro Barba (Italy) Niki Cadei	Ferrari F430 GT2	MI	64
12	GT2	51	(Italy) AF Corse	(Spain) Álvaro Barba (Italy) Niki Cadei	Ferrari F136 4.0 L V8	MI	64
13	GT2	56	(United Kingdom) CRS Racing	(United Kingdom) Rob Bell (United Kingdom) Andrew Kirkaldy	Ferrari F430 GT2	MI	64
13	GT2	56	(United Kingdom) CRS Racing	(United Kingdom) Rob Bell (United Kingdom) Andrew Kirkaldy	Ferrari F136 4.0 L V8	MI	64
14	GT2	95	(Argentina) PeCom Racing Team	(Argentina) Matías Russo (Argentina) Luís Pérez Companc	Ferrari F430 GT2	MI	64
14	GT2	95	(Argentina) PeCom Racing Team	(Argentina) Matías Russo (Argentina) Luís Pérez Companc	Ferrari F136 4.0 L V8	MI	64
15	GT2	55	(United Kingdom) CRS Racing	(Canada) Chris Niarchos (United Kingdom) Tim Mullen	Ferrari F430 GT2	MI	64
15	GT2	55	(United Kingdom) CRS Racing	(Canada) Chris Niarchos (United Kingdom) Tim Mullen	Ferrari F136 4.0 L V8	MI	64
16	GT2	97	(Italy) Brixia Racing	(Italy) Luigi Lucchini (Austria) Martin Ragginger	Porsche 997 GT3-RSR	MI	64
16	GT2	97	(Italy) Brixia Racing	(Italy) Luigi Lucchini (Austria) Martin Ragginger	Porsche M97/74 4.0 L Flat-6	MI	64
17	GT2	78	(Italy) BMS Scuderia Italia	(Italy) Diego Romanini (Germany) Kenneth Heyer	Ferrari F430 GT2	P	64
17	GT2	78	(Italy) BMS Scuderia Italia	(Italy) Diego Romanini (Germany) Kenneth Heyer	Ferrari F136 4.0 L V8	P	64
18	GT2	59	(United Kingdom) Trackspeed Racing	(United Kingdom) Tim Sugden (United Kingdom) David Ashburn	Porsche 997 GT3-RSR	MI	63
18	GT2	59	(United Kingdom) Trackspeed Racing	(United Kingdom) Tim Sugden (United Kingdom) David Ashburn	Porsche M97/74 4.0 L Flat-6	MI	63
19 DNF	GT1	18	(Czech Republic) K plus K Motorsport	(Czech Republic) Adam Lacko (Sweden) Max Nilsson	Saleen S7-R	MI	59
19 DNF	GT1	18	(Czech Republic) K plus K Motorsport	(Czech Republic) Adam Lacko (Sweden) Max Nilsson	Ford Windsor 7.0 L V8	MI	59
20	GT1	44	(Switzerland) Matech GT Racing	(Germany) Thomas Mutsch (Switzerland) Jonathan Hirschi	Ford GT1	MI	59
20	GT1	44	(Switzerland) Matech GT Racing	(Germany) Thomas Mutsch (Switzerland) Jonathan Hirschi	Ford Cammer 5.0 L V8	MI	59
21 NC	G2	112	(Slovakia) Autoracing Club Bratislava	(Slovakia) Miro Konopka (Slovakia) Andrej Studenic	Saleen S7-R	MI	48
21 NC	G2	112	(Slovakia) Autoracing Club Bratislava	(Slovakia) Miro Konopka (Slovakia) Andrej Studenic	Ford Windsor 7.0 L V8	MI	48
22 DNF	GT1	11	(Austria) Full Speed Racing Team	(Belgium) Stéphane Lémeret (United Kingdom) Luke Hines	Saleen S7-R	P	23
22 DNF	GT1	11	(Austria) Full Speed Racing Team	(Belgium) Stéphane Lémeret (United Kingdom) Luke Hines	Ford Windsor 7.0 L V8	P	23
23 DNF	GT1	2	(Germany) Vitaphone Racing Team	(Portugal) Miguel Ramos (Germany) Alex Müller	Maserati MC12 GT1	MI	5
23 DNF	GT1	2	(Germany) Vitaphone Racing Team	(Portugal) Miguel Ramos (Germany) Alex Müller	Maserati M144B/2 6.0 L V12	MI	5
DSQ	GT1	14	(Czech Republic) K plus K Motorsport	(Austria) Karl Wendlinger (United Kingdom) Ryan Sharp	Saleen S7-R	MI	67
DSQ	GT1	14	(Czech Republic) K plus K Motorsport	(Austria) Karl Wendlinger (United Kingdom) Ryan Sharp	Ford Windsor 7.0 L V8	MI	67

FIA GT Championship
Previous race: 24 Hours of Spa	2009 season	Next race: FIA GT Algarve 2 Hours
