= Andrew Kirkaldy (racing driver) =

British racing driver

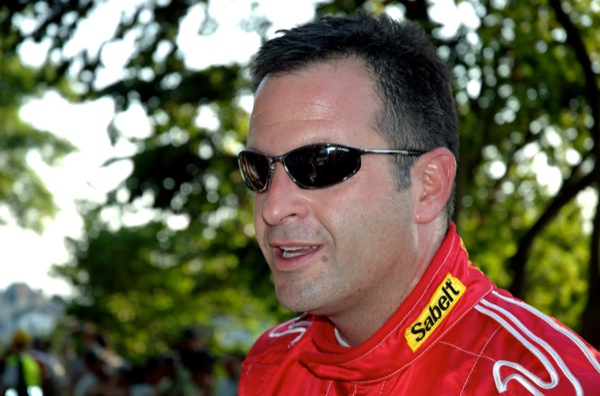
- British racing driver and Managing Director of McLaren Customer Racing Andrew Kirkaldy
- Nationality: (United Kingdom) British
- Born: Andrew James Kirkaldy; 1 March 1976 (age 50) St Andrews, Scotland

FIA GT Championship GT2 career
- Debut season: 2006
- Current team: CRS Racing
- Categorisation: FIA Platinum (until 2014); FIA Silver (2020–)
- Car number: 56
- Former teams: Scuderia Ecosse
- Starts: 36
- Wins: 4
- Poles: 10
- Best finish: 5th in 2009

Previous series
- 2007 2004–05 2004 2003 2002 2002 2001 2001 1999–2000 1998 1996–97: Porsche Carrera Cup GB; British GT Championship; Eurocup Formula Renault 2.0; ASCAR; FIA GT Championship N-GT; Renault Clio Cup GB; Atlantic Championship; German Formula Three; British Formula 3 Formula Opel Europe; Formula Vauxhall

Championship titles
- 2005: British GT Championship GT2

Awards
- 1997: McLaren Autosport Award

Andrew James Kirkaldy (born 1 March 1976 in St Andrews) is a British racing driver and managing director of McLaren Customer Racing.

== Career ==
=== Single-seaters ===
Kirkaldy began his career competing in karting, winning the Scottish Junior Championship in 1989 and the Scottish Senior Championship in 1993. He raced in the Formula Vauxhall championship in 1996 and 1997, finishing runner-up in 1997. He also won the McLaren Autosport BRDC Award in that year, which earnt him a prize test with the McLaren Formula One team. He was runner-up in Euroseries Formula Opel in 1998. He raced in the British Formula Three Championship in 1999 and 2000.

=== Sports cars ===
In addition to finishing runner-up in the Renault Clio Cup in 2002, Kirkaldy made his FIA GT Championship debut. In 2004 he moved to the British GT Championship, winning the series in 2005 with teammate Nathan Kinch for Scuderia Ecosse. He also made his 24 Hours of Le Mans debut in 2005 for the team. He returned to the FIA GT Championship in 2006 with Scuderia Ecosse, racing in the GT2 class. In 2008, he drove for his CRS Racing team in the championship.

=== Team AKA & CRS Racing ===
As well as his racing career, Kirkaldy is a successful team principal, founding his own Team AKA team in 2004. The team ran for four seasons in the British Formula Renault Championship, ending up with a second in the 2006 teams championship. The team also achieved two top-three drivers championship positions with James Jakes, who was third in 2005, and Patrick Hogan, who was second in 2006 only after losing a tie-breaker to Sebastian Hohenthal. In 2007 Chris Niarchos approached Kirkaldy with sponsoring of Team AKA in their fourth season of the British Formula Renault Championship, with the two having previously been team-mates on the Scuderia Ecosse team which competed in the FIA GT Championship. Team AKA then became known as AKA Cobra.

Following the 2007 season, Niarchos' interest in the team expanded as the two wished to enter their own team in not only the FIA GT Championship but the British GT Championship as well, ending their relationship with Scuderia Ecosse. The team was renamed once more and was relaunched as CR Scuderia, reflecting their choice of Italian Ferraris for their entry into grand tourer racing. The team was again renamed for 2009, becoming CRS Racing. Subsequently, CRS agreed a deal with McLaren to develop the GT3 version of the McLaren MP4-12C.

== 24 Hours of Le Mans results ==
Year	Team	Co-Drivers	Car	Class	Laps	Pos.	Class Pos.
2005	(United Kingdom) Scuderia Ecosse	(United Kingdom) Nathan Kinch (United Kingdom) Anthony Reid	Ferrari 360 Modena GTC	GT2	70	DNF	DNF
2006	(United Kingdom) Scuderia Ecosse	(Canada) Chris Niarchos (United Kingdom) Tim Mullen	Ferrari F430 GT2	GT2	311	17th	3rd
2007	(United Kingdom) Scuderia Ecosse	(Canada) Chris Niarchos (United Kingdom) Tim Mullen	Ferrari F430 GT2	GT2	241	DNF	DNF
2009	(United Kingdom) JMW Motorsport	(United Kingdom) Robert Bell (United Kingdom) Tim Sugden	Ferrari F430 GT2	GT2	320	23rd	4th

Sporting positions
Preceded by Jonathan Cocker	British GT Champion GT2 Class with: Nathan Kinch; 2005	Succeeded by Tim Mullen; Chris Niarchos
Awards and achievements
Preceded by Darren Turner	McLaren Autosport BRDC Award; 1997	Succeeded by Jenson Button
Preceded by James Pickford	Autosport; British Club Driver of the Year; 2005	Succeeded by Sam Bird
