= Selleslagh Racing Team =

Auto racing team in Belgium

(Belgium) Selleslagh Racing Team
- Team principal(s): Niels Selleslagh
- Current series: GT4 European Series; DTM Trophy
- Former series: FIA GT Championship; Belgian GT Championship; International GT Open

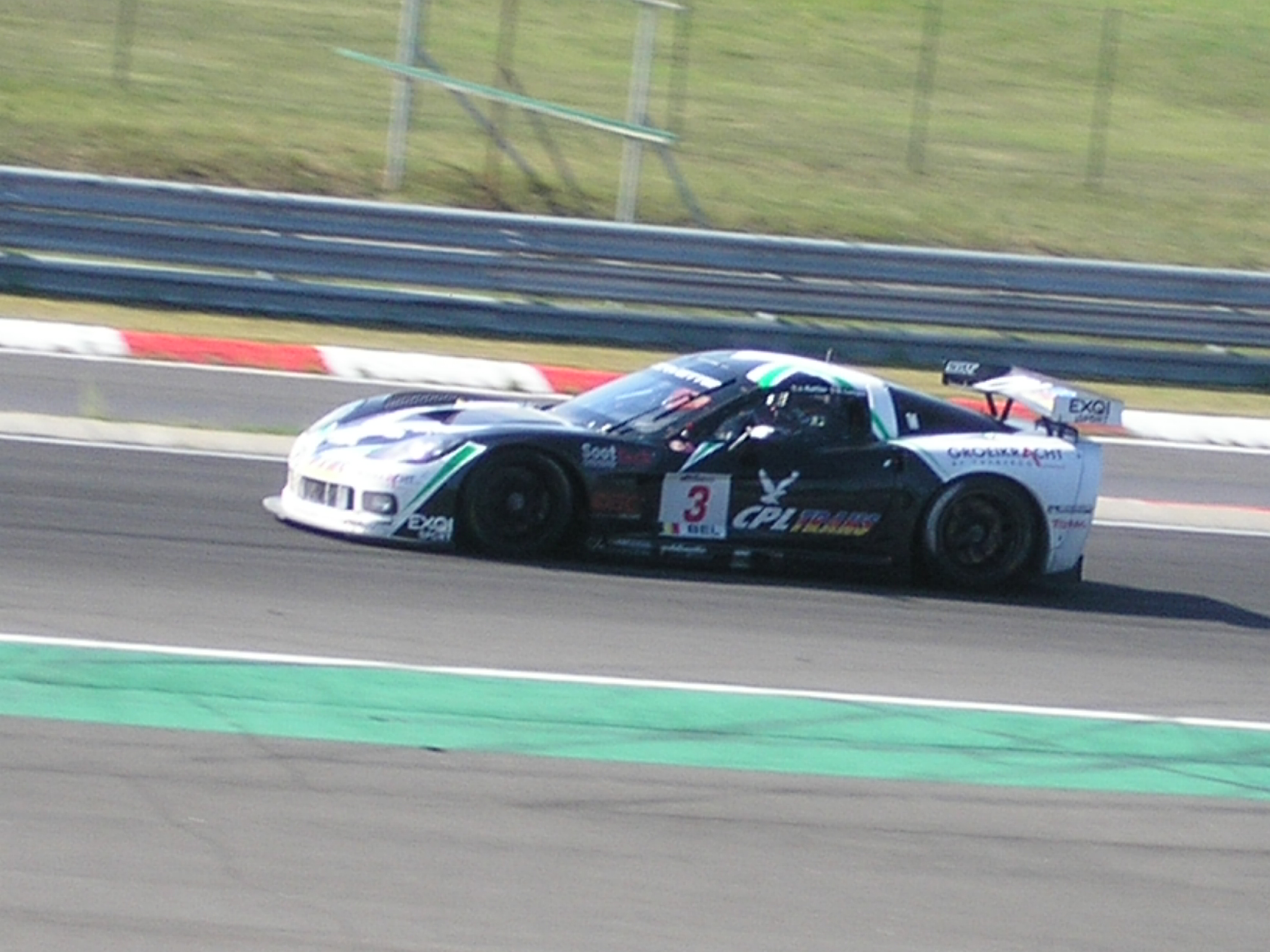
Selleslagh Racing Corvette C6.R at the 2009 Budapest City Challenge.

Selleslagh Racing Team (SRT) is a Belgian racing team, currently competing in the GT4 European Series.

In the 2010 season the team competed under the Mad-Croc Racing banner, the result of a collaboration between SRT and DKR Engineering of Luxembourg. For 2011 the two teams split to form two separate entries into the championship.

In 2011 the team concluded the season with a win in the last race. After this they started working in the background.

In 2014 the team is back. They acquired a Corvette C6 GTE and entered the car in the 2014 International GT Open season and elsewhere also.

In 2018 the team enters 3 cars in the GT4 European series and the Belcar endurance. The 3 cars are Mercedes AMG GT4, numbers during the races are 30, 31 and 32.
