= Tim Mullen =

British racing driver (born 1976)

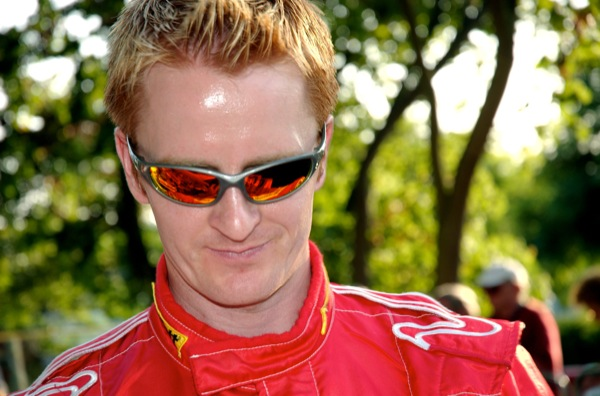
- Mullen in 2006
- Nationality: (United Kingdom) British
- Born: 28 March 1976 (age 50) Portadown, Northern Ireland
- Categorisation: FIA Platinum (until 2012); FIA Gold (2013–2016); FIA Silver (2017–)

Tim Mullen (born 28 March 1976 in Portadown, Northern Ireland) is a British racing driver. After starting his career in Karting, he entered the Irish Formula Ford championship in 1995 where he won the title. Moving to the British Formula Vauxhall Junior series the following year, he again took the honours as well as being selected as a finalist for the prestigious McLaren Autosport Young Driver of the Year award.

Mullen spent the next few years competing with success in Formula Renault and Formula Palmer Audi before moving to the British GT Championship where he became champion in 2006. He previously competed in the FIA GT Championship with CRS Racing driving a Ferrari Scuderia GT3.

== 24 Hours of Le Mans results ==
Year	Team	Co-Drivers	Car	Class	Laps	Pos.	Class Pos.
2005	(Germany) Kruse Motorsport	(United Kingdom) Ian Mitchell (United Kingdom) Phil Bennett	Courage C65-Judd	LMP2	268	24th	1st
2006	(United Kingdom) Scuderia Ecosse	(United Kingdom) Andrew Kirkaldy (Canada) Chris Niarchos	Ferrari F430 GT2	GT2	311	17th	3rd
2007	(United Kingdom) Scuderia Ecosse	(United Kingdom) Andrew Kirkaldy (Canada) Chris Niarchos	Ferrari F430 GT2	GT2	241	DNF	DNF
2008	(United Kingdom) Virgo Motorsport	(United Kingdom) Rob Bell (United Kingdom) Tim Sugden	Ferrari F430 GT2	GT2	289	DNF	DNF
