= 2010 British GT Championship =

Sports car racing season

Seasons
- ← 2009 2011 →

The 2010 Avon Tyres British GT season was the 18th season of the British GT Championship. The season began on 5 April at Oulton Park and finished on 16 October at Donington Park after thirteen races, twelve held in the United Kingdom as well as a single overseas event at Spa-Francorchamps.

Sexagenarian David Ashburn prevailed in the GT3 class, taking his Trackspeed car to the championship title after being helped by three different co-drivers during the season. After sharing his car with Siso Cunill and Richard Westbrook – Westbrook would later return to Trackspeed to boost Ashburn's championship challenge, sharing a car with Philip Walker – in one-off appearances scoring a podium with each, it was a driver 43 years his junior that he enjoyed most success with. Porsche Carrera Cup driver Glynn Geddie had competed with Ashburn at his home event at Knockhill but joined him full-time from the Rockingham meeting onwards, and the pairing took four victories in the last eight races to give Ashburn the championship and Geddie the runner-up spot. Duncan Cameron and Matt Griffin finished in third place, taking three victories during the season. Also taking three victories were defending champions David and Godfrey Jones, who struggled for reliability in their Ascari, finishing only five races all season. Hector Lester and Allan Simonsen, Tom Ferrier and Dan Brown, and Peter Kox and Marc Hayek were the other race winners.

In the G4 class, Christian Dick and Jamie Stanley were comfortable champions, taking five victories during the season as the Speedworks pair finished 32.5 points ahead of their nearest challengers. Rory Butcher and Benjamin Harvey only contested six of the season's thirteen races, but with a win and three second place finishes, amassed enough points to finish as the closest challengers to Dick and Stanley. Nathan Freke and Vibe Smed finished a point further back with seven podium finishes, with many of those coming where only half points were awarded. Brothers Benji and Freddie Hetherington won three of their five starts in the class, having spent most of the season in the Ginetta G50 Cup, Athanasios Ladas and Michael Mallock swept both races at Rockingham, with single victories going to Daniel Lloyd and Julien Draper, as well as another pair of brothers, Matt and Robert Bell. A GT Cup class was held at the first two meetings, with Phil Dryburgh and John Gaw claiming honours in both races at Oulton Park, and Steve Hunter and Derek Pierce taking a victory and a DNF at Knockhill.

== Rule changes ==
=== Class restructure and new homologations ===
On 15 October 2009 the SRO Motorsports Group announced changes to the structure of the 2010 season including a wider variety of circuits, with races broadcast on Channel 4 and viewable again on 4oD. The race coverage was also available on Motors TV. It was also announced that emphasis was placed on the avoidance of clashes with other prominent racing series.

For the 2010 season, the GT3 class had more homologated cars available to compete because homologated models of superseded FIA GT3-spec cars were eligible to race along with the Nationally homologated Mosler. Thirteen marques were available to race. They included Ascari, Aston Martin, Audi, BMW Alpina, Chevrolet, Dodge, Ferrari, Ford, Jaguar, Lamborghini, Morgan, Mosler and Porsche.

The G4 class also featured more cars because of the introduction of Supersport-spec cars from last year to the class such as Lotus, KTM and Donkervoort. In addition to the new Supersport cars into the G4 class, most GT4 homologated cars were eligible to race, including Aston Martin, BMW, Chevrolet, Ford, Gillet, Ginetta, Maserati, Nissan, Opel and Porsche.

The Cup class was reintroduced after a two-year absence. In previous years, it gave amateur race drivers the chance to compete in the highest level of GT racing in the UK and it returned due to heavy demand. The cars eligible were the cars currently used in the Porsche Supercup and Ferrari Challenge series, based on the Porsche 997 and Ferrari F430 road cars. It was only held at the first two meetings, with a single car running at each meeting.

== Entry list ==
The provisional entry list for the championship was released on 24 March 2010.

2010 Entry List
Team	No.	Drivers	Class	Chassis	Engine	Rounds
(United Kingdom) Team Preci-Spark	1	(United Kingdom) David Jones	GT3	Ascari KZ1-R	BMW M62 5.0L V8	1–12
(United Kingdom) Team Preci-Spark	1	(United Kingdom) Godfrey Jones	GT3	Ascari KZ1-R	BMW M62 5.0L V8	1–12
(United Kingdom) MTECH Racing	2	(United Kingdom) Duncan Cameron	GT3	Ferrari 430 Scuderia GT3	Ferrari 4.5L V8	All
(United Kingdom) MTECH Racing	2	(Republic of Ireland) Matt Griffin	GT3	Ferrari 430 Scuderia GT3	Ferrari 4.5L V8	All
(Denmark) Rosso Verde	3	(United Kingdom) Hector Lester	GT3	Ferrari F430 GT3	Ferrari 4.3L V8	1–5, 8–13
(Denmark) Rosso Verde	3	(Denmark) Allan Simonsen	GT3	Ferrari F430 GT3	Ferrari 4.3L V8	1–2, 5, 8–13
(Denmark) Rosso Verde	3	(France) Stephane Daoudi	GT3	Ferrari F430 GT3	Ferrari 4.3L V8	3–4
(United States) RPM Motorsport	4	(United Kingdom) Alex Mortimer	GT3	Ford GT GT3	Ford 5.0L V8	5–10, 13
(United States) RPM Motorsport	4	(United Kingdom) Philip Walker	GT3	Ford GT GT3	Ford 5.0L V8	5–7, 9–10, 13
(United States) RPM Motorsport	4	(United Kingdom) Peter Bamford	GT3	Ford GT GT3	Ford 5.0L V8	8
(United Kingdom) GT3 Racing	5	(United Kingdom) Aaron Scott	GT3	Dodge Viper Competition Coupe GT3	Dodge 8.3L V10	1–10
(United Kingdom) GT3 Racing	5	(United Kingdom) Craig Wilkins	GT3	Dodge Viper Competition Coupe GT3	Dodge 8.3L V10	1–10
(United Kingdom) Trackspeed	6	(United Kingdom) Oliver Bryant	GT3	Porsche 997 GT3-R	Porsche 4.0L	5
(United Kingdom) Trackspeed	6	(United Kingdom) Oliver Morley	GT3	Porsche 997 GT3-R	Porsche 4.0L	5
(United Kingdom) Trackspeed	6	(United Kingdom) Philip Walker	GT3	Porsche 997 GT3-R	Porsche 4.0L	8, 11–12
(United Kingdom) Trackspeed	6	(United Kingdom) Richard Westbrook	GT3	Porsche 997 GT3-R	Porsche 4.0L	8, 11–12
(United Kingdom) Trackspeed	7	(United Kingdom) David Ashburn	GT3	Porsche 997 GT3-R	Porsche 4.0L	All
(United Kingdom) Trackspeed	7	(Spain) Siso Cunill	GT3	Porsche 997 GT3-R	Porsche 4.0L	1–2
(United Kingdom) Trackspeed	7	(United Kingdom) Glynn Geddie	GT3	Porsche 997 GT3-R	Porsche 4.0L	3–4, 6–13
(United Kingdom) Trackspeed	7	(United Kingdom) Richard Westbrook	GT3	Porsche 997 GT3-R	Porsche 4.0L	5
(United Kingdom) Rollcentre Racing	8	(United Kingdom) Martin Short	GT3	Mosler MT900 R GT3	Chevrolet LS7 7.0L V8	6–10, 13
(United Kingdom) Rollcentre Racing	8	(United Kingdom) Gregor Fisken	GT3	Mosler MT900 R GT3	Chevrolet LS7 7.0L V8	6–7, 9–10, 13
(United Kingdom) Rollcentre Racing	8	(United Kingdom) Adrian Beer	GT3	Mosler MT900 R GT3	Chevrolet LS7 7.0L V8	8
(United Kingdom) Barwell-Beechdean	9	(United Kingdom) Andrew Howard	GT3	Aston Martin DBRS9	Aston Martin 6.0L V12	8, 11–12
(United Kingdom) Barwell-Beechdean	9	(United Kingdom) Darren Turner	GT3	Aston Martin DBRS9	Aston Martin 6.0L V12	8
(United Kingdom) Barwell-Beechdean	9	(Russia) Leo Machitski	GT3	Aston Martin DBRS9	Aston Martin 6.0L V12	11–12
(United Kingdom) Chad Racing	10	(United Kingdom) Tom Ferrier	GT3	Ferrari 430 Scuderia GT3	Ferrari 4.5L V8	1–8, 11–12
(United Kingdom) Chad Racing	10	(United Kingdom) Paul Warren	GT3	Ferrari 430 Scuderia GT3	Ferrari 4.5L V8	1–8, 11–12
(United Kingdom) Chad Racing	10	(United Kingdom) Stephen Jelley	GT3	Ferrari 430 Scuderia GT3	Ferrari 4.5L V8	13
(United Kingdom) Chad Racing	10	(United Kingdom) Benji Hetherington	GT3	Ferrari 430 Scuderia GT3	Ferrari 4.5L V8	13
(United Kingdom) Chad Racing	11	(Argentina) José Manuel Balbiani	GT3	Ferrari F430 GT3	Ferrari 4.3L V8	1–7
(United Kingdom) Chad Racing	11	(Argentina) Juan Garriz	GT3	Ferrari F430 GT3	Ferrari 4.3L V8	1–7
(United Kingdom) Chad Racing	15	(United Kingdom) Steven Kane	GT3	Ferrari 430 Scuderia GT3	Ferrari 4.3L V8	8
(United Kingdom) Chad Racing	15	(United Kingdom) Iain Dockerill	GT3	Ferrari 430 Scuderia GT3	Ferrari 4.3L V8	8
(United Kingdom) Chad Racing	15	(United Kingdom) Archie Hamilton	GT3	Ferrari 430 Scuderia GT3	Ferrari 4.3L V8	11–12
(United Kingdom) Chad Racing	15	(United Kingdom) Ryan Lewis	GT3	Ferrari 430 Scuderia GT3	Ferrari 4.3L V8	11–12
(United Kingdom) Chad Racing	21	(United Kingdom) Daniel Brown	GT3	Ferrari 430 Scuderia GT3	Ferrari 4.5L V8	All
(United Kingdom) Chad Racing	21	(South Africa) Christopher Hyman	GT3	Ferrari 430 Scuderia GT3	Ferrari 4.5L V8	1–8, 11–13
(United Kingdom) Chad Racing	21	(United Kingdom) Tom Ferrier	GT3	Ferrari 430 Scuderia GT3	Ferrari 4.5L V8	9–10
(United Kingdom) Chad Racing	50	(United Kingdom) Michael Mallock	G4	KTM X-Bow	Volkswagen 2.0L Turbo I4	6–7
(United Kingdom) Chad Racing	50	(Greece) Athanasios Ladas	G4	KTM X-Bow	Volkswagen 2.0L Turbo I4	6–8
(United Kingdom) Chad Racing	50	(Netherlands) Kevin Veltman	G4	KTM X-Bow	Volkswagen 2.0L Turbo I4	8
(United Kingdom) Predator CCTV Racing	12	(United Kingdom) Adam Wilcox	GT3	Ferrari 430 Scuderia GT3	Ferrari 4.5L V8	All
(United Kingdom) Predator CCTV Racing	12	(United Kingdom) Phil Burton	GT3	Ferrari 430 Scuderia GT3	Ferrari 4.5L V8	All
(United Kingdom) Vantage Racing	14	(United Kingdom) Stuart Hall	GT3	Aston Martin DBRS9	Aston Martin 6.0L V12	8, 13
(United Kingdom) Vantage Racing	14	(United Kingdom) Tom Black	GT3	Aston Martin DBRS9	Aston Martin 6.0L V12	8, 13
(United Kingdom) Barwell-Cadena	18	(United Kingdom) Michael Bentwood	GT3	Aston Martin DBRS9	Aston Martin 6.0L V12	1–2, 5, 8–12
(United Kingdom) Barwell-Cadena	18	(United Kingdom) Paul Whight	GT3	Aston Martin DBRS9	Aston Martin 6.0L V12	1–2, 5, 8–12
(United States) United Autosports	22	(United States) Michael Guasch	GT3	Audi R8 LMS	Audi 5.2L V10	1–2
(United States) United Autosports	22	(United States) Mark Patterson	GT3	Audi R8 LMS	Audi 5.2L V10	1–2
(United States) United Autosports	23	(United States) Zak Brown	GT3	Audi R8 LMS	Audi 5.2L V10	1–2
(United States) United Autosports	23	(United Kingdom) Richard Dean	GT3	Audi R8 LMS	Audi 5.2L V10	1–2
(United States) United Autosports	53	(United Kingdom) Matt Bell	G4	Ginetta G50	Ford Cyclone 3.5L V6	8
(United States) United Autosports	53	(United Kingdom) Robert Bell	G4	Ginetta G50	Ford Cyclone 3.5L V6	8
(Germany) Reiter Engineering	24	(Netherlands) Peter Kox	GT3	Lamborghini Gallardo LP560 GT3	Lamborghini 5.2L V10	5
(Germany) Reiter Engineering	24	(Switzerland) Marc Hayek	GT3	Lamborghini Gallardo LP560 GT3	Lamborghini 5.2L V10	5
(United Kingdom) Stark Racing	42	(United Kingdom) Ian Stinton	G4	Ginetta G50	Ford Cyclone 3.5L V6	8
(United Kingdom) Stark Racing	42	(United Kingdom) Paul Marsh	G4	Ginetta G50	Ford Cyclone 3.5L V6	8
(United Kingdom) ABG Motorsport	44	(United Kingdom) Benjamin Harvey	G4	KTM X-Bow	Volkswagen 2.0L Turbo I4	1–5, 8
(United Kingdom) ABG Motorsport	44	(United Kingdom) Rory Butcher	G4	KTM X-Bow	Volkswagen 2.0L Turbo I4	1–5, 8
(United Kingdom) ABG Motorsport	98	(United Kingdom) Colin Mowle	Inv	KTM X-Bow	Volkswagen 2.0L Turbo I4	8, 13
(United Kingdom) ABG Motorsport	98	(United Kingdom) Sam Mowle	Inv	KTM X-Bow	Volkswagen 2.0L Turbo I4	8, 13
(United Kingdom) ProMotorsport	45	(United Kingdom) Derek Palmer Jr.	G4	Nissan 350Z	Nissan VQ35HR 3.5L V6	1–2
(United Kingdom) ProMotorsport	45	(United Kingdom) Rick Pearson	G4	Nissan 350Z	Nissan VQ35HR 3.5L V6	1–2
(United Kingdom) Century Motorsport	47	(United Kingdom) Nathan Freke	G4	Ginetta G50	Ford Cyclone 3.5L V6	1–4, 6–13
(United Kingdom) Century Motorsport	47	(Denmark) Vibe Smed	G4	Ginetta G50	Ford Cyclone 3.5L V6	1–4, 6–13
(United Kingdom) Century Motorsport	57	(United Kingdom) Benji Hetherington	G4	Ginetta G50	Ford Cyclone 3.5L V6	8–12
(United Kingdom) Century Motorsport	57	(United Kingdom) Freddie Hetherington	G4	Ginetta G50	Ford Cyclone 3.5L V6	8–12
(United Kingdom) Speedworks Motorsport	48	(United Kingdom) Christian Dick	G4	Ginetta G50	Ford Cyclone 3.5L V6	All
(United Kingdom) Speedworks Motorsport	48	(United Kingdom) Jamie Stanley	G4	Ginetta G50	Ford Cyclone 3.5L V6	All
(United Kingdom) Speedworks Motorsport	92	(United Kingdom) Piers Johnson	Inv	Ginetta G50 Mod	Ford Cyclone 3.5L V6	13
(United Kingdom) Speedworks Motorsport	92	(United Kingdom) Ron Johnson	Inv	Ginetta G50 Mod	Ford Cyclone 3.5L V6	13
(United Kingdom) Team Osborne Racing	49	(United Kingdom) Joe Osborne	G4	Ginetta G50	Ford Cyclone 3.5L V6	1–10, 13
(United Kingdom) Team Osborne Racing	49	(United Kingdom) Osman Yusuf	G4	Ginetta G50	Ford Cyclone 3.5L V6	1–8, 13
(United Kingdom) Team Osborne Racing	49	(United Kingdom) Rob Brown	G4	Ginetta G50	Ford Cyclone 3.5L V6	9–10
(United Kingdom) Team Osborne Racing	52	(United Kingdom) Jake Rattenbury	G4	Ginetta G50	Ford Cyclone 3.5L V6	11–12
(United Kingdom) Team Osborne Racing	52	(United Kingdom) Dean Hawkey	G4	Ginetta G50	Ford Cyclone 3.5L V6	11–12
(United Kingdom) Barwell Motorsport	51	(United Kingdom) Julien Draper	G4	Ginetta G50	Ford Cyclone 3.5L V6	11–12
(United Kingdom) Barwell Motorsport	51	(United Kingdom) Daniel Lloyd	G4	Ginetta G50	Ford Cyclone 3.5L V6	11–12
(United Kingdom) Piranha Motorsport	55	(United Kingdom) Chris Bialan	G4	Lotus 2-Eleven	Toyota 2ZZ-GE 1.8L S/C I4	1–4, 6–12
(United Kingdom) Piranha Motorsport	55	(United Kingdom) Simon Mason	G4	Lotus 2-Eleven	Toyota 2ZZ-GE 1.8L S/C I4	1–4, 6–12
(United Kingdom) Appleby Engineering	60	(United Kingdom) James Appleby	G4	Aston Martin V8 Vantage N24	Aston Martin 4.3L V8	9–10
(United Kingdom) Appleby Engineering	60	(United Kingdom) Ant Scragg	G4	Aston Martin V8 Vantage N24	Aston Martin 4.3L V8	9–10
(United Kingdom) Jamie Hunter Racing	62	(United Kingdom) Steve Hunter	GTC	Porsche 997 GT3 Cup S	Porsche 3.6L Flat-6	3–4
(United Kingdom) Jamie Hunter Racing	62	(United Kingdom) Derek Pierce	GTC	Porsche 997 GT3 Cup S	Porsche 3.6L Flat-6	3–4
(United Kingdom) Kinfaun Racing	81	(United Kingdom) Phil Dryburgh	GTC	Porsche 997 GT3 Cup S	Porsche 3.6L Flat-6	1–2
(United Kingdom) Kinfaun Racing	81	(United Kingdom) John Gaw	GTC	Porsche 997 GT3 Cup S	Porsche 3.6L Flat-6	1–2
(United Kingdom) Reflex Racing	91	(United Kingdom) Peter Smith	Inv	Ginetta G50 Mod	Ford Cyclone 3.5L V6	8–10
(United Kingdom) Reflex Racing	91	(Czech Republic) Matt Smith	Inv	Ginetta G50 Mod	Ford Cyclone 3.5L V6	8–10
(United Kingdom) Chevron Racing Cars	97	(United Kingdom) Anthony Reid	Inv	Chevron GR8	Ford Cosworth YD 2.0L Turbo I4	13
(United Kingdom) Chevron Racing Cars	97	(United Kingdom) Chris Hart	Inv	Chevron GR8	Ford Cosworth YD 2.0L Turbo I4	13

Icon	Class
GT3	GT3 Class
G4	G4 Class
GTC	Cup Class
Inv	Invitation Class

== Calendar ==
- All rounds were 60 minutes in duration, with the exception of the round at Spa-Francorchamps – a 150-minute race held in conjunction with Belcar – as well as the two-hour races at Silverstone and Donington Park. A GT Cup class ran at the first two meetings with Kinfaun Racing winning twice at Oulton Park and Jamie Hunter Racing winning at Knockhill. All races except Belgian round at Spa, were held in the United Kingdom.

Round	Circuit	Date	Pole position	GT3 winner	G4 Winner
1	Oulton Park	5 April	#1 Team Preci-Spark	#2 MTECH Racing	#48 Speedworks Motorsport
1	Oulton Park	5 April	(United Kingdom) Godfrey Jones (United Kingdom) David Jones	(United Kingdom) Duncan Cameron (Republic of Ireland) Matt Griffin	(United Kingdom) Christian Dick (United Kingdom) Jamie Stanley
2	Oulton Park	5 April	#3 Rosso Verde	#2 MTECH Racing	#44 ABG Motorsport
2	Oulton Park	5 April	(United Kingdom) Hector Lester (Denmark) Allan Simonsen	(United Kingdom) Duncan Cameron (Republic of Ireland) Matt Griffin	(United Kingdom) Benjamin Harvey (United Kingdom) Rory Butcher
3	Knockhill	9 May	#1 Team Preci-Spark	#1 Team Preci-Spark	#48 Speedworks Motorsport
3	Knockhill	9 May	(United Kingdom) Godfrey Jones (United Kingdom) David Jones	(United Kingdom) Godfrey Jones (United Kingdom) David Jones	(United Kingdom) Christian Dick (United Kingdom) Jamie Stanley
4	Knockhill	9 May	#12 Predator CCTV	#1 Team Preci-Spark	#48 Speedworks Motorsport
4	Knockhill	9 May	(United Kingdom) Phil Burton (United Kingdom) Adam Wilcox	(United Kingdom) Godfrey Jones (United Kingdom) David Jones	(United Kingdom) Christian Dick (United Kingdom) Jamie Stanley
5	Spa-Francorchamps	5 June	#24 Reiter Engineering	#24 Reiter Engineering	#48 Speedworks Motorsport
5	Spa-Francorchamps	5 June	(Netherlands) Peter Kox (Switzerland) Marc Hayek	(Netherlands) Peter Kox (Switzerland) Marc Hayek	(United Kingdom) Christian Dick (United Kingdom) Jamie Stanley
6	Rockingham	18 July	#8 Rollcentre Racing	#7 Trackspeed	#50 Chad Racing
6	Rockingham	18 July	(United Kingdom) Martin Short (United Kingdom) Gregor Fisken	(United Kingdom) David Ashburn (United Kingdom) Glynn Geddie	(United Kingdom) Michael Mallock (Greece) Athanasios Ladas
7	Rockingham	18 July	#7 Trackspeed	#7 Trackspeed	#50 Chad Racing
7	Rockingham	18 July	(United Kingdom) David Ashburn (United Kingdom) Glynn Geddie	(United Kingdom) David Ashburn (United Kingdom) Glynn Geddie	(United Kingdom) Michael Mallock (Greece) Athanasios Ladas
8	Silverstone	15 August	#6 Trackspeed	#7 Trackspeed	#53 United Autosports
8	Silverstone	15 August	(United Kingdom) Philip Walker (United Kingdom) Richard Westbrook	(United Kingdom) David Ashburn (United Kingdom) Glynn Geddie	(United Kingdom) Matt Bell (United Kingdom) Robert Bell
9	Snetterton	30 August	#1 Team Preci-Spark	#21 Chad Racing	#57 Century Motorsport
9	Snetterton	30 August	(United Kingdom) Godfrey Jones (United Kingdom) David Jones	(United Kingdom) Tom Ferrier (United Kingdom) Dan Brown	(United Kingdom) Benji Hetherington (United Kingdom) Freddie Hetherington
10	Snetterton	30 August	#12 Predator CCTV	#2 MTECH Racing	#57 Century Motorsport
10	Snetterton	30 August	(United Kingdom) Phil Burton (United Kingdom) Adam Wilcox	(United Kingdom) Duncan Cameron (Republic of Ireland) Matt Griffin	(United Kingdom) Benji Hetherington (United Kingdom) Freddie Hetherington
11	Brands Hatch	26 September	#1 Team Preci-Spark	#7 Trackspeed	#57 Century Motorsport
11	Brands Hatch	26 September	(United Kingdom) Godfrey Jones (United Kingdom) David Jones	(United Kingdom) David Ashburn (United Kingdom) Glynn Geddie	(United Kingdom) Benji Hetherington (United Kingdom) Freddie Hetherington
12	Brands Hatch	26 September	#3 Rosso Verde	#1 Team Preci-Spark	#51 Barwell Motorsport
12	Brands Hatch	26 September	(United Kingdom) Hector Lester (Denmark) Allan Simonsen	(United Kingdom) Godfrey Jones (United Kingdom) David Jones	(United Kingdom) Julien Draper (United Kingdom) Daniel Lloyd
13	Donington Park	16 October	#3 Rosso Verde	#3 Rosso Verde	#48 Speedworks Motorsport
13	Donington Park	16 October	(United Kingdom) Hector Lester (Denmark) Allan Simonsen	(United Kingdom) Hector Lester (Denmark) Allan Simonsen	(United Kingdom) Christian Dick (United Kingdom) Jamie Stanley

== Standings ==
Points were awarded to the top eight finishers in the order 10-8-6-5-4-3-2-1 for 60 minute races, with double points awarded for the endurance races. Half-points were given in certain races of the G4 class, and in all GT Cup races due to a lack of entries. Drivers in bold indicate pole position, while drivers in italics indicate fastest lap.

=== GT3 ===
Pos	Driver	OUL		KNO		SPA	ROC		SIL	SNE		BRH		DON	Pts
1	(United Kingdom) David Ashburn	5	3	3	Ret	2	1	1	1	4	9	1	5	2	107
2	(United Kingdom) Glynn Geddie			3	Ret		1	**1**	1	4	9	1	5	2	81
3	(United Kingdom) Duncan Cameron	1	1	2	Ret	6	5	2	10	8	1	6	6	3	75
3	(Republic of Ireland) Matt Griffin	1	1	2	Ret	6	5	2	10	8	1	6	6	3	75
5	(United Kingdom) Hector Lester	2	2	7	Ret	10			2	2	6	Ret	DNS	1	65
6	(Denmark) Allan Simonsen	2	**2**			10			2	2	6	Ret	**DNS**	**1**	63
7	(United Kingdom) Philip Walker					5	3	Ret	4	3	7	2	3	8	50
8	(United Kingdom) Phil Burton	6	7	6	3	7	8	5	8	9†	5	4	4	5	47
8	(United Kingdom) Adam Wilcox	6	7	6	**3**	7	8	5	8	9†	**5**	4	4	5	47
10	(United Kingdom) Tom Ferrier	7	6	Ret	4	Ret	4	Ret	11	1	2	Ret	2		41
11	(United Kingdom) David Jones	**Ret**	Ret	**1**	1	DNS	DNS	DNS	7	**Ret**	3	**Ret**	1		40
11	(United Kingdom) Godfrey Jones	Ret	Ret	1	1	DNS	DNS	DNS	7	Ret	3	Ret	1		40
13	(United Kingdom) Richard Westbrook					2			**4**			2	3		40
14	(United Kingdom) Alex Mortimer					5	3	Ret	5	3	7			8	34
15	(United Kingdom) Martin Short						2	10	12	6†	4			4	29
15	(United Kingdom) Gregor Fisken						**2**	10		6†	4			4	29
17	(United Kingdom) Daniel Brown	9	11†	Ret	DNS	8	9	4	9	1	2	Ret	DNS	Ret	26
18	(United Kingdom) Michael Bentwood	3	Ret			4			13	5	10	3	Ret		26
18	(United Kingdom) Paul Whight	3	Ret			4			13	5	10	3	Ret		26
20	(United Kingdom) Paul Warren	7	6	Ret	4	Ret	4	Ret	11			Ret	2		23
21	(Netherlands) Peter Kox					**1**									20
21	(Switzerland) Marc Hayek					1									20
23	(United Kingdom) Aaron Scott	DNS	DNS	5	7†	Ret	7	3	Ret	7	8				19
23	(United Kingdom) Craig Wilkins	DNS	DNS	5	7†	Ret	7	3	Ret	7	8				19
25	(Argentina) José Manuel Balbiani	10†	Ret	4	2	9	6	Ret							16
25	(Argentina) Juan Garriz	10†	Ret	4	2	9	6	Ret							16
27	(United Kingdom) Andrew Howard								3			5	Ret		16
28	(United Kingdom) Oliver Bryant					3									12
28	(United Kingdom) Oliver Morley					3									12
28	(United Kingdom) Darren Turner								3						12
31	(Spain) Siso Cunill	5	3												10
32	(United States) Zak Brown	4	4												10
32	(United Kingdom) Richard Dean	4	4												10
34	(South Africa) Christopher Hyman	9	11†	Ret	DNS	8	9	4	9			Ret	DNS	Ret	8
35	(United Kingdom) Peter Bamford								5						8
36	(United Kingdom) Tom Black								16					6	6
36	(United Kingdom) Stuart Hall								16					6	6
38	(United Kingdom) Iain Dockerill								6						6
38	(United Kingdom) Steven Kane								6						6
40	(United States) Michael Guasch	8	5												5
40	(United States) Mark Patterson	8	5												5
42	(Russia) Leo Machitski											5	Ret		4
43	(France) Stephane Daoudi			7	Ret										2
44	(United Kingdom) Benji Hetherington													13†	2
44	(United Kingdom) Stephen Jelley													13†	2
46	(United Kingdom) Adrian Beer								12						0
	(United Kingdom) Archie Hamilton											DNS	DNS		0
	(United Kingdom) Ryan Lewis											DNS	DNS		0
Guest drivers ineligible for points
	(United Kingdom) Chris Hart													7	0
	(United Kingdom) Anthony Reid													7	0
	(United Kingdom) Piers Johnson													10	0
	(United Kingdom) Ron Johnson													10	0
	(United Kingdom) Colin Mowle								14					9	0
	(United Kingdom) Sam Mowle								14					9	0
	(United Kingdom) Peter Smith								20	15	15				0
	(Czech Republic) Matt Smith								20	15	15				0
Pos	Driver	OUL		KNO		SPA	ROC		SIL	SNE		BRH		DON	Pts

Colour	Result
Gold	Winner
Silver	Second place
Bronze	Third place
Green	Points classification
Blue	Non-points classification
Blue	Non-classified finish (NC)
Purple	Retired, not classified (Ret)
Red	Did not qualify (DNQ)
Red	Did not pre-qualify (DNPQ)
Black	Disqualified (DSQ)
White	Did not start (DNS)
White	Withdrew (WD)
White	Race cancelled (C)
Blank	Did not practice (DNP)
Blank	Did not arrive (DNA)
Blank	Excluded (EX)

=== G4 ===
Pos	Driver	OUL		KNO		SPA	ROC		SIL	SNE		BRH		DON	Pts
1	(United Kingdom) Christian Dick	12	10	**9**	5	**11**	13	9	Ret	13	**12**	8	9	11	70.5
1	(United Kingdom) Jamie Stanley	**12**	10	9	5	11	13	9	Ret	13	12	**8**	9	11	70.5
3	(United Kingdom) Rory Butcher	13	**9**	Ret	6	12			21†						38
3	(United Kingdom) Benjamin Harvey	13	9	Ret	6	12			**21**†						38
5	(United Kingdom) Nathan Freke	15	Ret	11	**8**		12	8	Ret	11	13	10	**Ret**	**12**	37
5	(Denmark) Vibe Smed	15	Ret	11	8		12	8	Ret	11	13	10	Ret	12	37
7	(United Kingdom) Chris Bialan	14	12	Ret	9†		**11**	7	19			Ret			32.5
7	(United Kingdom) Simon Mason	14	12	Ret	9†		11	**7**	19			Ret			32.5
9	(United Kingdom) Benji Hetherington								DSQ	10	11	7	8		24
9	(United Kingdom) Freddie Hetherington								DSQ	**10**	11	7	8		24
11	(Greece) Athanasios Ladas						10	6	18						22
12	(United Kingdom) Matt Bell								15						20
12	(United Kingdom) Robert Bell								15						20
14	(United Kingdom) Joe Osborne	16	13	10	10†	Ret	14†	Ret		12	Ret			Ret	20
15	(United Kingdom) Osman Yusuf	16	13	10	10†	Ret	14†	Ret						Ret	17
16	(United Kingdom) Paul Marsh								17						16
16	(United Kingdom) Ian Stinton								17						16
18	(Netherlands) Kevin Veltman								18						12
19	(United Kingdom) Julien Draper											9	7		11
19	(United Kingdom) Daniel Lloyd											9	7		11
21	(United Kingdom) Michael Mallock						10	6							10
22	(United Kingdom) James Appleby									14	14				4.5
22	(United Kingdom) Ant Scragg									14	14				4.5
24	(United Kingdom) Dean Hawkey											11	Ret		4
24	(United Kingdom) Jake Rattenbury											11	Ret		4
26	(United Kingdom) Rob Brown									12	Ret				3
27	(United Kingdom) Derek Palmer Jr.	17	Ret												3
27	(United Kingdom) Rick Pearson	17	Ret												3
Pos	Driver	OUL		KNO		SPA	ROC		SIL	SNE		BRH		DON	Pts

=== GT Cup ===
Pos	Driver	OUL		KNO		SPA	ROC	SIL	SNE	BRH	DON	Pts
1	(United Kingdom) Phil Dryburgh	**11**	8									10
1	(United Kingdom) John Gaw	11	**8**									10
3	(United Kingdom) Steve Hunter			8	**Ret**							5
3	(United Kingdom) Derek Pierce			**8**	Ret							5
Pos	Driver	OUL		KNO		SPA	ROC	SIL	SNE	BRH	DON	Pts
