= 2009 British GT Championship =

Sports car racing season

Seasons
- ← 2008 2010 →

The 2009 Avon Tyres British GT season was the 17th season of the British GT Championship. The season began at Oulton Park's Easter Monday meeting and finished on 20 September at Brands Hatch after 14 races. 2009 saw the debut of the new Supersport class. Twins David and Godfrey Jones won the GT3 title during the final race of the season. Jody Firth sealed the GT4 title, while Phil Keen and Marcus Clutton won the Supersports Class.

== Drivers and teams ==
- All cars ran on Avon tyres.

2009 Entry List
Team	No.	Drivers	Class	Chassis	Engine	Rounds
(United States) RPM Motorsport	2	(United Kingdom) Michael Bentwood	GT3	Ford GT GT3	Ford 5.0L V8	5–10
(United States) RPM Motorsport	2	(United Kingdom) Philip Walker	GT3	Ford GT GT3	Ford 5.0L V8	5–14
(United States) RPM Motorsport	2	(United Kingdom) Alex Mortimer	GT3	Ford GT GT3	Ford 5.0L V8	11–14
(United Kingdom) Chad Racing	3	(South Africa) Christopher Hyman	GT3	Ferrari F430 GT3	Ferrari 4.3L V8	1–10, 12–14
(United Kingdom) Chad Racing	3	(United Kingdom) Paul Warren	GT3	Ferrari F430 GT3	Ferrari 4.3L V8	1–6, 9–14
(United Kingdom) Chad Racing	3	(Argentina) José Manuel Balbiani	GT3	Ferrari F430 GT3	Ferrari 4.3L V8	7–8, 11
(United Kingdom) Beechdean Motorsport	7	(United Kingdom) Andrew Howard	GT3	Aston Martin DBRS9	Aston Martin 6.0L V12	1–6, 9–10, 12–14
(United Kingdom) Beechdean Motorsport	7	(United Kingdom) Jamie Smyth	GT3	Aston Martin DBRS9	Aston Martin 6.0L V12	1–6, 9–10, 12–14
(United Kingdom) Beechdean Motorsport	50	(United Kingdom) Ben de Zille-Butler	GT4	Aston Martin V8 Vantage N24	Aston Martin AJ 4.3L V8	1–2
(United Kingdom) Beechdean Motorsport	50	(United Kingdom) Richard Jones	GT4	Aston Martin V8 Vantage N24	Aston Martin AJ 4.3L V8	1–2
(United Kingdom) Rollcentre Racing	8	(United Kingdom) Gregor Fisken	GT3	Mosler MT900R	Chevrolet LS7 7.0L V8	3–4
(United Kingdom) Rollcentre Racing	8	(United Kingdom) Martin Short	GT3	Mosler MT900R	Chevrolet LS7 7.0L V8	3–4
(United Kingdom) Rollcentre Racing	9	(United Kingdom) Daniel Brown	GT3	Mosler MT900R	Chevrolet LS7 7.0L V8	1–11
(United Kingdom) Rollcentre Racing	9	(United Kingdom) Stuart Hall	GT3	Mosler MT900R	Chevrolet LS7 7.0L V8	1–4
(United Kingdom) Rollcentre Racing	9	(United Kingdom) Gregor Fisken	GT3	Mosler MT900R	Chevrolet LS7 7.0L V8	5–8
(United Kingdom) Rollcentre Racing	9	(United Kingdom) Martin Short	GT3	Mosler MT900R	Chevrolet LS7 7.0L V8	9–11
(United Kingdom) VRS Equipment Finance	12	(United Kingdom) Phil Burton	GT3	Ferrari F430 GT3	Ferrari 4.3L V8	All
(United Kingdom) VRS Equipment Finance	12	(United Kingdom) Adam Wilcox	GT3	Ferrari F430 GT3	Ferrari 4.3L V8	All
(United Kingdom) ABG Motorsport	20	(United Kingdom) Aaron Scott	GT3	Dodge Viper Competition Coupe	Dodge 8.3L V10	All
(United Kingdom) ABG Motorsport	20	(United Kingdom) Craig Wilkins	GT3	Dodge Viper Competition Coupe	Dodge 8.3L V10	All
(United Kingdom) ABG Motorsport	66	(United Kingdom) Marcus Clutton	SS	KTM X-Bow	Volkswagen 2.0L Turbo I4	1–2, 11
(United Kingdom) ABG Motorsport	66	(United Kingdom) Phil Keen	SS	KTM X-Bow	Volkswagen 2.0L Turbo I4	1–2, 11
(United Kingdom) MTECH Racing	21	(United Kingdom) Duncan Cameron	GT3	Ferrari F430 GT3; Ferrari 430 Scuderia	Ferrari 4.3L V8	All
(United Kingdom) MTECH Racing	21	(Republic of Ireland) Matt Griffin	GT3	Ferrari F430 GT3; Ferrari 430 Scuderia	Ferrari 4.3L V8	1–2, 5–8, 11–12
(United Kingdom) MTECH Racing	21	(United Kingdom) Mike Wilds	GT3	Ferrari F430 GT3; Ferrari 430 Scuderia	Ferrari 4.3L V8	3–4, 9–10
(United Kingdom) MTECH Racing	21	(United Kingdom) Mike Edmonds	GT3	Ferrari F430 GT3; Ferrari 430 Scuderia	Ferrari 4.3L V8	13–14
(United Kingdom) Team Preci-Spark	22	(United Kingdom) David Jones	GT3	Ascari KZ1-R	BMW M62 5.0L V8	All
(United Kingdom) Team Preci-Spark	22	(United Kingdom) Godfrey Jones	GT3	Ascari KZ1-R	BMW M62 5.0L V8	All
(Denmark) Rosso Verde	23	(United Kingdom) Hector Lester	GT3	Ferrari F430 GT3	Ferrari 4.3L V8	All
(Denmark) Rosso Verde	23	(Denmark) Allan Simonsen	GT3	Ferrari F430 GT3	Ferrari 4.3L V8	1–6, 9–14
(Denmark) Rosso Verde	23	(France) Stéphane Daoudi	GT3	Ferrari F430 GT3	Ferrari 4.3L V8	7–8
(United Kingdom) 22 GT Racing	32	(United Kingdom) Tom Alexander	GT3	Aston Martin DBRS9	Aston Martin 6.0L V12	3–4
(United Kingdom) 22 GT Racing	32	(United Kingdom) Adrian Willmott	GT3	Aston Martin DBRS9	Aston Martin 6.0L V12	3–4
(United Kingdom) Century Motorsport	41	(United Kingdom) Nathan Freke	GT4	Ginetta G50	Ford Cyclone 3.5L V6	11
(United Kingdom) Century Motorsport	41	(United Kingdom) Benji Hetherington	GT4	Ginetta G50	Ford Cyclone 3.5L V6	11
(United Kingdom) Stark Racing	44	(United Kingdom) Ian Stinton	GT4	Ginetta G50	Ford Cyclone 3.5L V6	1–8, 12–14
(United Kingdom) Stark Racing	44	(United Kingdom) Mike Thomas	GT4	Ginetta G50	Ford Cyclone 3.5L V6	3–6
(United Kingdom) Stark Racing	44	(United Kingdom) Paul Marsh	GT4	Ginetta G50	Ford Cyclone 3.5L V6	7–8
(United Kingdom) Stark Racing	44	(United Kingdom) Gary Simms	GT4	Ginetta G50	Ford Cyclone 3.5L V6	13–14
(United Kingdom) Stark Racing	44	(United Kingdom) Neil Clark	GT4	Ginetta G50	Ford Cyclone 3.5L V6	12
(United Kingdom) Stark Racing	46	(United Kingdom) Neil Clark	GT4	Ginetta G50	Ford Cyclone 3.5L V6	1–2
(United Kingdom) Stark Racing	46	(United Kingdom) Ian Stinton	GT4	Ginetta G50	Ford Cyclone 3.5L V6	9–10
(United Kingdom) Stark Racing	46	(United Kingdom) Hunter Abbott	GT4	Ginetta G50	Ford Cyclone 3.5L V6	9–10
(United Kingdom) Team WFR	52	(United Kingdom) Jody Firth	GT4	Ginetta G50	Ford Cyclone 3.5L V6	All
(United Kingdom) Team WFR	52	(United Kingdom) Nigel Moore	GT4	Ginetta G50	Ford Cyclone 3.5L V6	1–6, 9–14
(United Kingdom) Speedworks Motorsport	53	(United Kingdom) Richard Sykes	GT4	Ginetta G50	Ford Cyclone 3.5L V6	1–2, 12
(United Kingdom) Speedworks Motorsport	53	(United Kingdom) Lawrence Tomlinson	GT4	Ginetta G50	Ford Cyclone 3.5L V6	1–2
(United Kingdom) Speedworks Motorsport	53	(United Kingdom) Christian Dick	GT4	Ginetta G50	Ford Cyclone 3.5L V6	12
(United Kingdom) Rob Austin Racing	54	(United Kingdom) Hunter Abbott	GT4	Ginetta G50	Ford Cyclone 3.5L V6	1–6
(United Kingdom) Rob Austin Racing	54	(United Kingdom) Gary Simms	GT4	Ginetta G50	Ford Cyclone 3.5L V6	1–6
(United Kingdom) Piranha Motorsport	67	(United Kingdom) Chris Bialan	SS	Lotus 2-Eleven	Toyota 2ZZ-GE 1.8L I4	13–14
(United Kingdom) Piranha Motorsport	67	(United Kingdom) Simon Mason	SS	Lotus 2-Eleven	Toyota 2ZZ-GE 1.8L I4	13–14
(United Kingdom) Barwell Motorsport	72	(Belgium) Eddy Renard	GT3	Aston Martin DBRS9	Aston Martin 6.0L V12	1–2
(United Kingdom) Barwell Motorsport	72	(Belgium) Vincent Vosse	GT3	Aston Martin DBRS9	Aston Martin 6.0L V12	1–2
(United Kingdom) Barwell Motorsport	90	(United Kingdom) Andrew Smith	Inv	Ginetta G50Z	Zytek 4.5L V8	3–4
(United Kingdom) Barwell Motorsport	90	(United Kingdom) Oliver Bryant	Inv	Ginetta G50Z	Zytek 4.5L V8	3–6, 9–10, 12
(United Kingdom) Barwell Motorsport	90	(United Kingdom) Joe Osborne	Inv	Ginetta G50Z	Zytek 4.5L V8	5–6
(United Kingdom) Barwell Motorsport	90	(United Kingdom) Piers Johnson	Inv	Ginetta G50Z	Zytek 4.5L V8	9–10, 12
(United Kingdom) Barwell Motorsport	90	(Russia) Leo Machitski	Inv	Ginetta G50Z	Zytek 4.5L V8	13–14
(United Kingdom) Barwell Motorsport	90	(United Kingdom) Phil Quaife	Inv	Ginetta G50Z	Zytek 4.5L V8	13–14
(United Kingdom) Mark Bailey Racing	91	(United Kingdom) Howard Spooner	Inv	Morgan Aero 8	BMW N62 4.8L V8	12–14
(United Kingdom) Mark Bailey Racing	91	(United Kingdom) Andy Thompson	Inv	Morgan Aero 8	BMW N62 4.8L V8	12
(Austria) KTM	92	(Austria) Reinhard Kofler	Inv	KTM X-Bow	Volkswagen 2.0L Turbo I4	13–14
(United Kingdom) Moore Racing	93	(United Kingdom) Dave Shelton	Inv	Mosler MT900	Chevrolet LS7 7.0L V8	13–14

Icon	Class
GT3	GT3 Class
GT4	GT4 Class
SS	Supersport Class
Inv	Invitation Class

== Calendar ==
- All rounds were a duration of 60 minutes, except rounds 11 and 12, which were two-hour endurance races. Only the overall winners are listed. The Donington enduro was originally scheduled for April 26, however due to ongoing issues with the circuit's track licence, the meeting was rescheduled for July 19. In the Spa-Francorchamps round, the British GT field was included in the Belcar Championship races.

Round	Circuit	Date	Pole position	Fastest lap	Winning drivers	Winning team
1	(United Kingdom) Oulton Park	11 April	(United Kingdom) Daniel Brown (United Kingdom) Stuart Hall	(United Kingdom) Hector Lester (Denmark) Alan Simonsen	(United Kingdom) Daniel Brown (United Kingdom) Stuart Hall	Rollcentre Racing
2	(United Kingdom) Oulton Park	13 April	(United Kingdom) Daniel Brown (United Kingdom) Stuart Hall	(United Kingdom) Daniel Brown (United Kingdom) Stuart Hall	(United Kingdom) Daniel Brown (United Kingdom) Stuart Hall	Rollcentre Racing
3	(Belgium) Spa-Francorchamps	9 May	(United Kingdom) Daniel Brown (United Kingdom) Stuart Hall	(United Kingdom) Hector Lester (Denmark) Alan Simonsen	(United Kingdom) Gregor Fisken (United Kingdom) Martin Short	Rollcentre Racing
4	(Belgium) Spa-Francorchamps	10 May	(United Kingdom) Hector Lester (Denmark) Alan Simonsen	(United Kingdom) Aaron Scott (United Kingdom) Craig Wilkins	(United Kingdom) Aaron Scott (United Kingdom) Craig Wilkins	ABG Motorsport
5	(United Kingdom) Rockingham	30 May	(United Kingdom) Oliver Bryant (United Kingdom) Joe Osborne	(United Kingdom) Oliver Bryant (United Kingdom) Joe Osborne	(United Kingdom) Oliver Bryant (United Kingdom) Joe Osborne	Barwell Motorsport
6	(United Kingdom) Rockingham	31 May	(United Kingdom) Hector Lester (Denmark) Alan Simonsen	(United Kingdom) Hector Lester (Denmark) Alan Simonsen	(United Kingdom) Oliver Bryant (United Kingdom) Joe Osborne	Barwell Motorsport
7	(United Kingdom) Knockhill	13 June	(United Kingdom) David Jones (United Kingdom) Godfrey Jones	(United Kingdom) Hector Lester (France) Stéphane Daoudi	(United Kingdom) David Jones (United Kingdom) Godfrey Jones	Team Preci-Spark
8	(United Kingdom) Knockhill	14 June	(United Kingdom) Duncan Cameron (Republic of Ireland) Matt Griffin	(United Kingdom) Gregor Fisken (United Kingdom) Daniel Brown	(United Kingdom) Aaron Scott (United Kingdom) Craig Wilkins	ABG Motorsport
9	(United Kingdom) Snetterton	4 July	(United Kingdom) Daniel Brown (United Kingdom) Martin Short	(United Kingdom) Daniel Brown (United Kingdom) Martin Short	(United Kingdom) David Jones (United Kingdom) Godfrey Jones	Team Preci-Spark
10	(United Kingdom) Snetterton	5 July	(Denmark) Allan Simonsen (United Kingdom) Hector Lester	(Denmark) Allan Simonsen (United Kingdom) Hector Lester	(Denmark) Allan Simonsen (United Kingdom) Hector Lester	Rosso Verde
11	(United Kingdom) Donington Park	19 July	(United Kingdom) Duncan Cameron (Republic of Ireland) Matt Griffin	(United Kingdom) Hector Lester (Denmark) Alan Simonsen	(United Kingdom) Alex Mortimer (United Kingdom) Philip Walker	RPM Motorsport
12	(United Kingdom) Silverstone	16 August	(United Kingdom) Duncan Cameron (Republic of Ireland) Matt Griffin	(United Kingdom) Hector Lester (Denmark) Alan Simonsen	(United Kingdom) Duncan Cameron (Republic of Ireland) Matt Griffin	MTECH Racing
13	(United Kingdom) Brands Hatch	19 September	(United Kingdom) Andrew Howard (United Kingdom) Jamie Smyth	(United Kingdom) Alex Mortimer (United Kingdom) Philip Walker	(United Kingdom) David Jones (United Kingdom) Godfrey Jones	Team Preci-Spark
14	(United Kingdom) Brands Hatch	20 September	(United Kingdom) Hector Lester (Denmark) Alan Simonsen	(United Kingdom) Hector Lester (Denmark) Alan Simonsen	(Russia) Leo Machitski (United Kingdom) Phil Quaife	Barwell Motorsport

== Standings ==
Points are awarded to the top eight finishers in the order 10-8-6-5-4-3-2-1. Drivers in bold indicate pole position. Drivers in italics indicate fastest lap.

=== GT3 ===
Pos	Driver	OUL (United Kingdom)		SPA (Belgium)		ROC (United Kingdom)		KNO (United Kingdom)		SNE (United Kingdom)		DON (United Kingdom)	SIL (United Kingdom)	BRH (United Kingdom)		Pts
1	(United Kingdom) David Jones	2	2	2	Ret	Ret	3	**1**	4	**1**	3	5	11†	1	4	87
1	(United Kingdom) Godfrey Jones	2	2	2	Ret	Ret	3	1	4	1	3	5	11†	1	4	87
3	(United Kingdom) Hector Lester	3	4	4	2	2	8	3	5	3	1	6	7	3	2	86
4	(Denmark) Allan Simonsen	3	4	4	**2**	2	**8**			3	**1**	6	7	3	**2**	76
5	(United Kingdom) Aaron Scott	6	3	3	1	Ret	4	4	1	Ret	7	3	2	4	14†	69
5	(United Kingdom) Craig Wilkins	6	3	3	1	Ret	4	4	1	Ret	7	3	2	4	14†	69
7	(United Kingdom) Phil Burton	DNS	DNS	Ret	7	3	5	2	2	4	6	Ret	4	2	3	62
7	(United Kingdom) Adam Wilcox	DNS	DNS	Ret	7	3	5	2	2	4	6	Ret	4	2	3	62
9	(United Kingdom) Duncan Cameron	4	5	7	8	Ret	Ret	Ret	7†	9†	4	2	1	6	7	49
10	(United Kingdom) Daniel Brown	**1**	1	**5**	Ret	**5**	2	5	8	DSQ	DSQ	DSQ				44
11	(United Kingdom) Andrew Howard	7	8	8	4	4	6			8	5		5	**9**	5	40
11	(United Kingdom) Jamie Smyth	7	8	8	4	4	6			8	5		5	9	5	40
13	(United Kingdom) Philip Walker					7	9	6	6	5	8	1	3	8	6	39
14	(United Kingdom) Gregor Fisken			1	3	5	2	5	8							36
15	(Republic of Ireland) Matt Griffin	4	5			Ret	Ret	Ret	**7**†			**2**	**1**			29
16	(South Africa) Chris Hyman	13†	6	10†	6	6	7	7	3	Ret	9		Ret	7	8	29
17	(United Kingdom) Paul Warren	13†	6	10†	6	6	7			Ret	9	4	Ret	7	8	26
18	(United Kingdom) Stuart Hall	1	**1**	5	Ret											24
19	(United Kingdom) Alex Mortimer											1	3	8	6	22
20	(United Kingdom) Michael Bentwood					7	9	6	6	5	8					17
21	(United Kingdom) Martin Short			1	3					DSQ	DSQ	DSQ				16
22	(Argentina) José Manuel Balbiani							7	3			4				13
23	(United Kingdom) Mike Wilds			7	8					9†	4					13
24	(France) Stéphane Daoudi							3	5							10
25	(United Kingdom) Mike Edmonds													6	7	7
26	(Belgium) Eddy Renard	5	7*													4
26	(Belgium) Vincent Vosse	5	7*													4
28	(United Kingdom) Tom Alexander			13	5											4
28	(United Kingdom) Adrian Willmott			13	5											4
Guest drivers ineligible for points
	(United Kingdom) Oliver Bryant			6	11	1	1			2	2		6			0
	(United Kingdom) Joe Osborne					**1**	1									0
	(Russia) Leo Machitski													5	1	0
	(United Kingdom) Phil Quaife													5	1	0
	(United Kingdom) Piers Johnson									2	2		6			0
	(United Kingdom) Andrew Smith			6	11											0
	(Austria) Reinhard Kofler													10	9	0
	(United Kingdom) Howard Spooner												DNS	Ret	11	0
	(United Kingdom) Dave Shelton													12	DNS	0
	(United Kingdom) Andy Thompson												DNS			0
Pos	Driver	OUL (United Kingdom)		SPA (Belgium)		ROC (United Kingdom)		KNO (United Kingdom)		SNE (United Kingdom)		DON (United Kingdom)	SIL (United Kingdom)	BRH (United Kingdom)		Pts

Colour	Result
Gold	Winner
Silver	Second place
Bronze	Third place
Green	Points classification
Blue	Non-points classification
Blue	Non-classified finish (NC)
Purple	Retired, not classified (Ret)
Red	Did not qualify (DNQ)
Red	Did not pre-qualify (DNPQ)
Black	Disqualified (DSQ)
White	Did not start (DNS)
White	Withdrew (WD)
White	Race cancelled (C)
Blank	Did not practice (DNP)
Blank	Did not arrive (DNA)
Blank	Excluded (EX)

† — Drivers did not finish the race, but were classified as they completed over 90% of the race distance.

=== GT4 ===
Pos	Driver	OUL (United Kingdom)		SPA (Belgium)		ROC (United Kingdom)		KNO (United Kingdom)		SNE (United Kingdom)		DON (United Kingdom)	SIL (United Kingdom)	BRH (United Kingdom)		Pts
1	(United Kingdom) Jody Firth	**8**	9	**12**	9	8	11	**8**	**10**	**6**	10	7	**8**	**11**	10	76
2	(United Kingdom) Nigel Moore	8	**9**	12	9	8	**11**			6	**10**	7	8	11	**10**	67
3	(United Kingdom) Ian Stinton	9	12	11	Ret	9	12	Ret	9	7	11		10	13	13	48
4	(United Kingdom) Hunter Abbott	DSQ	11	9	**10**	Ret	10			7	11					28
5	(United Kingdom) Gary Simms	DSQ	11	9	10	**Ret**	10							13	13	28
6	(United Kingdom) Richard Sykes	Ret	10										9			12
7	(United Kingdom) Neil Clark	11	15										10			12
8	(United Kingdom) Mike Thomas			11	Ret	9	12									11
9	(United Kingdom) Ben de Zille Butler	12	14													9
9	(United Kingdom) Richard Jones	12	14													9
11	(United Kingdom) Lawrence Tomlinson	Ret	10													8
12	(United Kingdom) Paul Marsh							Ret	9							5
13	(United Kingdom) Christian Dick												9			4
14	(United Kingdom) Nathan Freke											**9**				4
14	(United Kingdom) Benji Hetherington											9				4
Pos	Driver	OUL (United Kingdom)		SPA (Belgium)		ROC (United Kingdom)		KNO (United Kingdom)		SNE (United Kingdom)		DON (United Kingdom)	SIL (United Kingdom)	BRH (United Kingdom)		Pts

=== Supersport ===
Pos	Driver	OUL (United Kingdom)		SPA (Belgium)	ROC (United Kingdom)	KNO (United Kingdom)	SNE (United Kingdom)	DON (United Kingdom)	SIL (United Kingdom)	BRH (United Kingdom)		Pts
1	(United Kingdom) Marcus Clutton	**10**	13					**8**				15
1	(United Kingdom) Phil Keen	10	**13**					8				15
3	(United Kingdom) Chris Bialan									**14**†	12	10
3	(United Kingdom) Simon Mason									14†	**12**	10
Pos	Driver	OUL (United Kingdom)		SPA (Belgium)	ROC (United Kingdom)	KNO (United Kingdom)	SNE (United Kingdom)	DON (United Kingdom)	SIL (United Kingdom)	BRH (United Kingdom)		Pts

=== Notes ===
- Renard and Vosse were not awarded points in race two at Oulton Park, due to running standard-spec pump fuel, following issues with the championship's Sunoco fuel during race one.
- Supersport Class drivers are awarded half points, due to a lack of competitors.
- At Rockingham, as the Invitation Class Ginetta won both races, Simonsen and Lester were awarded maximum points in race one, and Brown and Fisken in race two. The Ginetta also won at Brands Hatch, with Simonsen and Lester again receiving maximum points.
- From Spa onwards, half points were awarded in GT4, due to a lack of competitors.
- The Mosler MT900R of Daniel Brown and Martin Short competed at Snetterton and Donington under protest due to a loophole in the regulations. Eventually, the Mosler was stripped of points gained from the rounds.
