= Daniel Brown (racing driver) =

British racing driver

- Nationality: (United Kingdom) British
- Born: 5 July 1991 (age 35) Essex, United Kingdom

European Le Mans Series career
- Current team: Gulf Racing
- Car number: 85

NASCAR FedEx Freight Truck Series career
- 1 race run over 1 year
- 2015 position: 74th
- Best finish: 74th (2015)
- First race: 2015 Chevrolet Silverado 250 (Mosport)
| Wins | Top tens | Poles |
|---|---|---|
| 0 | 0 | 0 |
- Statistics up to date as of 30 August 2015.

Daniel Brown (born 5 July 1991) is a professional racing driver based in the UK. He began in karting at the age of 12, and has raced in the GT3 category across Europe.

== Racing career ==
Brown's racing history started at the age of 12 in Rotax MiniMax, finishing third for 2004, and second for 2005 at Lydd International Raceway.

Brown moved to the very competitive series of T Cars at the age of 14. The sheer pace of the T Cars fuelled his passion for motorsport, which drove him to finishing 2007 as T Cars Champion.

In 2008, Brown competed in the FPA Championship, with a proven record of pole positions – race wins – fastest laps, Brown caused a stir in the Formula Palmer Audi 2008 Championship. Brown finished eighth, and highest placed rookie, but left the championship looking for something different.

2009 brought a new challenge in the form of GT racing, Brown competed in the Avon Tyres British GT Championship for Rollcentre Racing. With a double victory on his debut weekend, Brown immediately made his mark in the Sportscar world.

In 2010, Brown returned to the British GT Championship series at the wheel of a Ferrari 430 Scuderia GT3. He teamed up with veteran Chris Hyman in a car backed by fuel additive brand STP, Brown achieved a number of successes throughout the season, and became recognised by the BRDC as a Rising Star of UK motorsport.

For 2011, Brown teamed up with Glynn Geddie in the FIA GT3 European Championship, driving for leading Italian squad AF Corse in a Ferrari 458 GT3. During 2011, Brown was recognised for his driving talents and successes at a high level, and became one of the youngest, full members of the BRDC.

Brown is becoming well known for his driving talents and continued through the ranks of GT racing by moving into the Blancpain Endurance Series for 2012. He again teamed up with the leading Italian team, AF Corse in Ferrari 458 GT3 and took part in the famous 24 Hours of Spa.

2013 saw Brown return to the British GT Championship in a BMW Z4 GT3 driving for the leading UK team, Triple Eight Racing. Daniel had a successful year finishing on the podium 3 times and ending the season 6th in the championship.

Brown made the move into the European Le Mans Series in 2014, driving for Gulf Racing in an Aston Martin Vantage GTE with Stuart Hall and Roald Goethe. The 5 round series visits some of Europe's most famous circuits.

Brown continued racing GT's throughout the UK and Europe, with successes coming at various levels, including the overall win at the 2018 Silverstone 12 Hours in a ROFGO Racing Mercedes AMG GT3, and claiming the BEC GT4 title in the MKH Racing Aston Martin Vantage GT4 in 2023.

Alongside the modern racing, Brown claimed several race wins and titles driving the family run Ford Escort Mk1, Ford Escort Mk2 and more recently in the Ford Sierra RS500 Cosworth.

== Motorsports career results ==
=== NASCAR ===
(key) (Bold – Pole position awarded by qualifying time. Italics – Pole position earned by points standings or practice time. * – Most laps led.)

==== Camping World Truck Series ====
NASCAR Camping World Truck Series results
| Year | Team | No. | Make | 1 | 2 | 3 | 4 | 5 | 6 | 7 | 8 | 9 | 10 | 11 | 12 | 13 | 14 | 15 | 16 | 17 | 18 | 19 | 20 | 21 | 22 | 23 | NCWTC | Pts | Ref |
|---|---|---|---|---|---|---|---|---|---|---|---|---|---|---|---|---|---|---|---|---|---|---|---|---|---|---|---|---|---|
| 2015 | MB Motorsports | 63 | Chevy | DAY | ATL | MAR | KAN | CLT | DOV | TEX | GTW | IOW | KEN | ELD | POC | MCH | BRI | MSP; 27 | CHI | NHA | LVS | TAL | MAR | TEX | PHO | HOM | 74th | 27 | |
