= Ferrari F430 =

V8 sports car manufactured by Ferrari

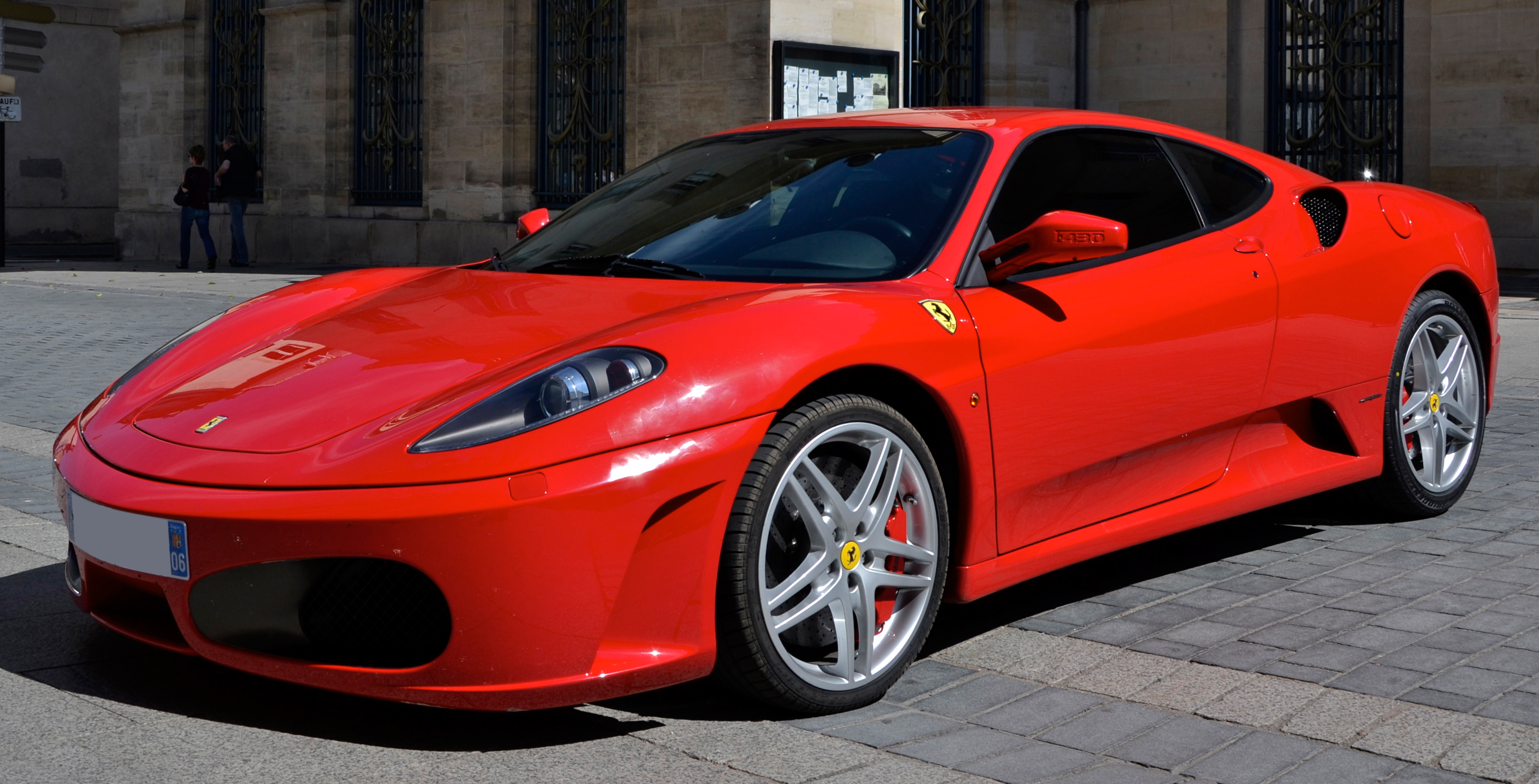

Overview
- Manufacturer: Ferrari
- Also called: Ferrari 430
- Production: 2004–July 2009
- Model years: 2005–2009
- Assembly: Italy: Maranello
- Designer: Frank Stephenson in collaboration with Pininfarina

Body and chassis
- Class: Sports car (S)
- Body style: 2-door berlinetta 2-door spider
- Layout: Longitudinal, Rear mid-engine, rear-wheel drive
- Related: New Stratos

Powertrain
- Engine: 4.3 L Ferrari F136 E V8
- Power output: F430 & Spider: 490 PS (360 kW; 483 hp); 430 Scuderia & Scuderia Spider 16M: 510 PS (375 kW; 503 hp)
- Transmission: 6-speed manual; 6-speed Graziano 'F1' automated manual

Dimensions
- Wheelbase: 2,601 mm (102.4 in)
- Length: 4,511 mm (177.6 in)
- Width: 1,923 mm (75.7 in)
- Height: Coupe: 1,214 mm (47.8 in); Spider: 1,234 mm (48.6 in)
- Curb weight: 1,517 kg (3,344 lb) 1,569 kg (3,460 lb) (Spider); 1,497 kg (3,300 lb) (Scuderia Spider 16M) 1,429 kg (3,150 lb) (Scuderia)

Chronology
- Predecessor: Ferrari 360
- Successor: Ferrari 458

The Ferrari F430 (Type F131) is a sports car that was produced by the Italian automobile manufacturer Ferrari from 2004 until 2009 as a successor to the Ferrari 360. The car is an update to the 360 with exterior and performance changes. It was unveiled at the 2004 Paris Motor Show. The F430 was succeeded by the 458 which was unveiled on 28 July 2009. An estimated 16,750 F430s were produced between 2005 and 2009.

== Overview ==
=== Design ===
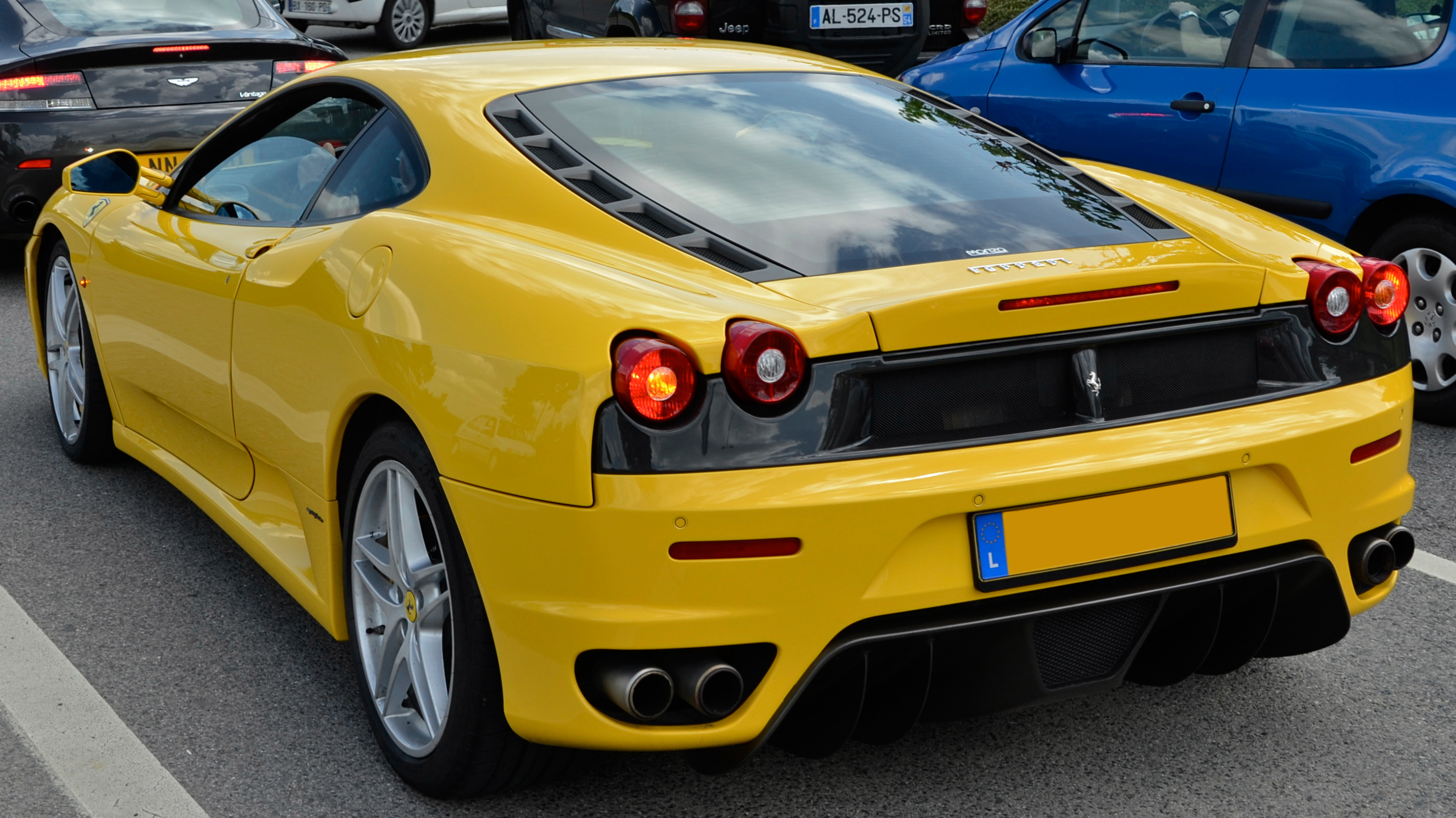
F430 rear view

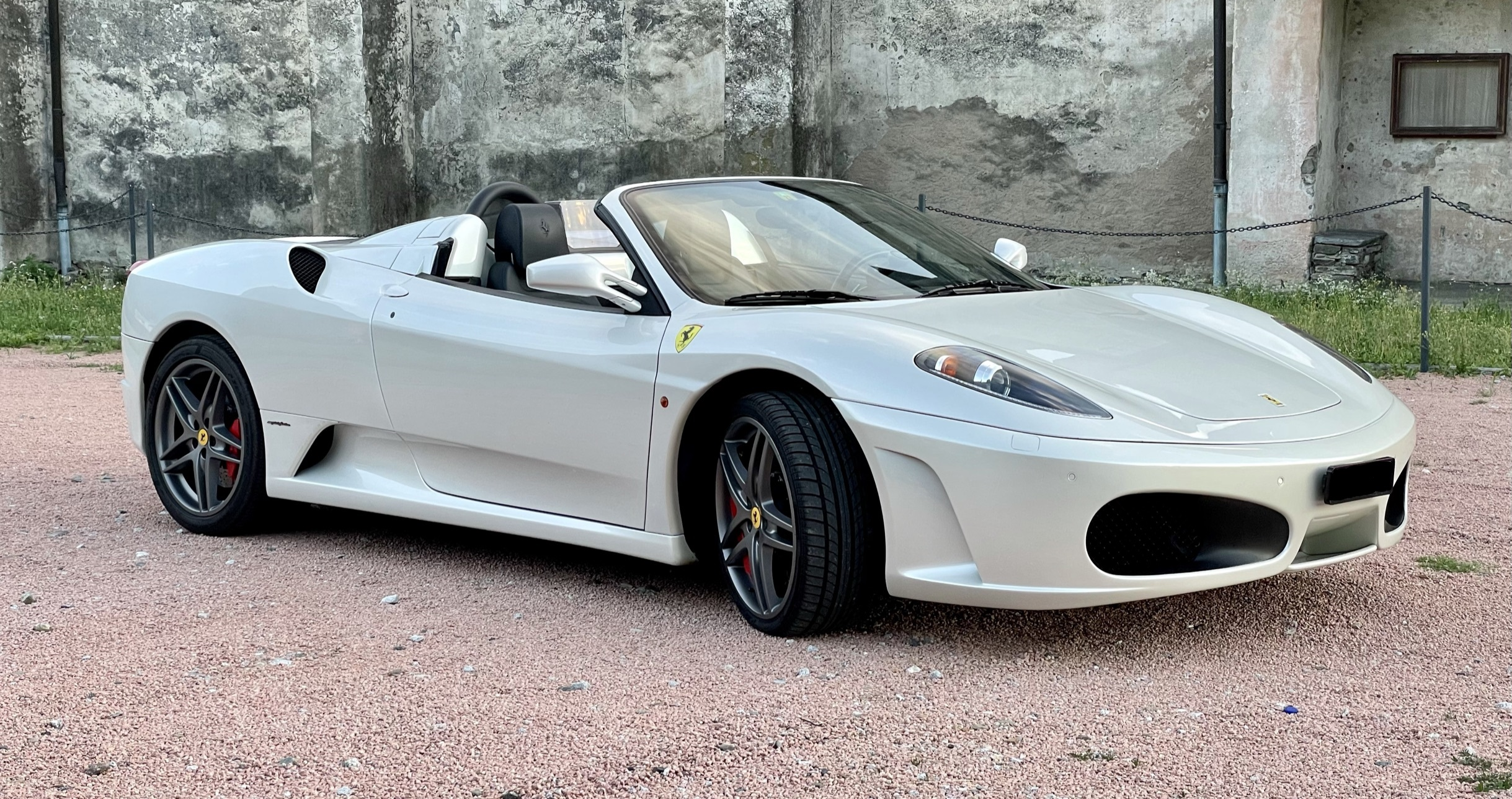
F430 Spider in a rare white (Bianco Fuji) color

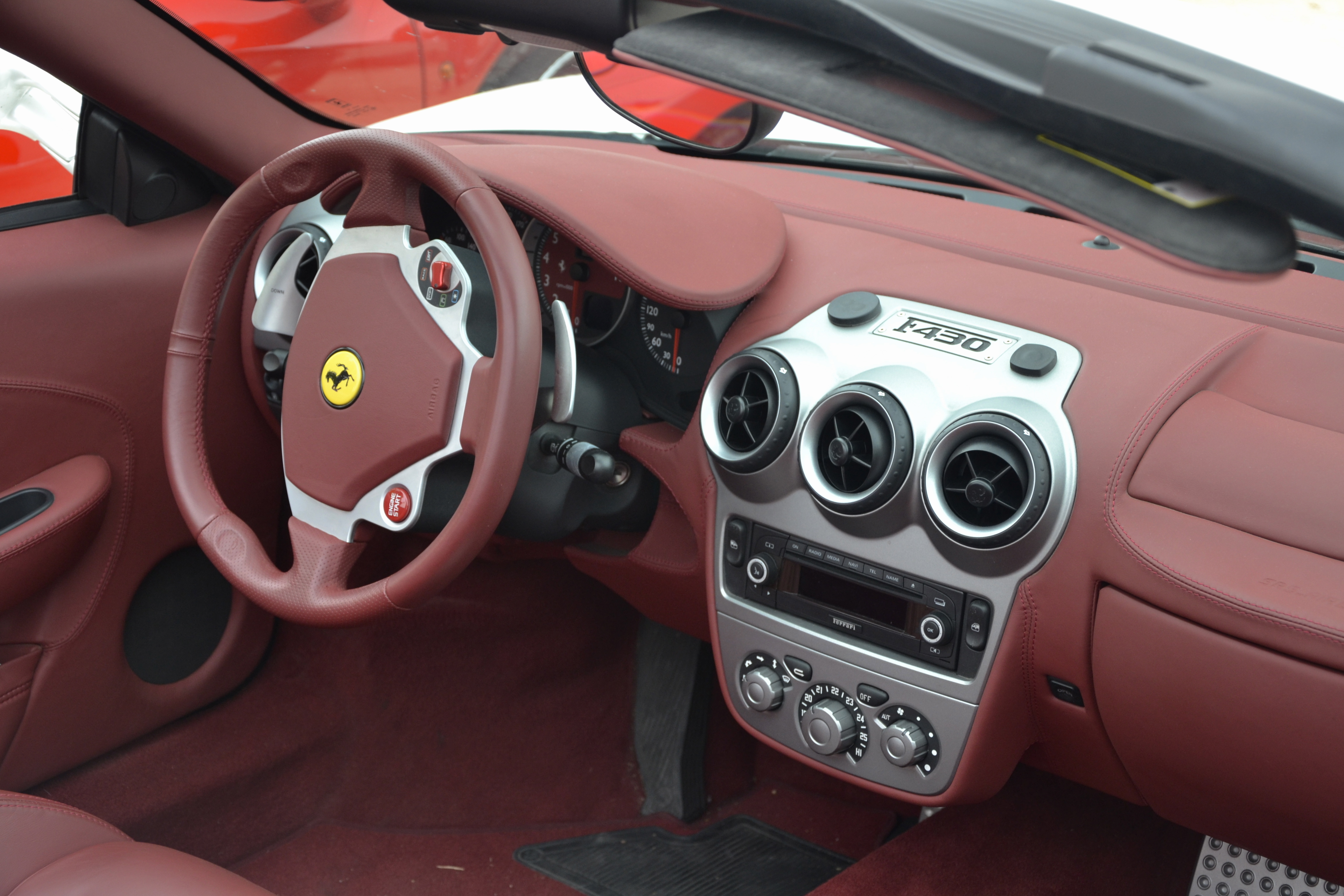
F430 Spider interior

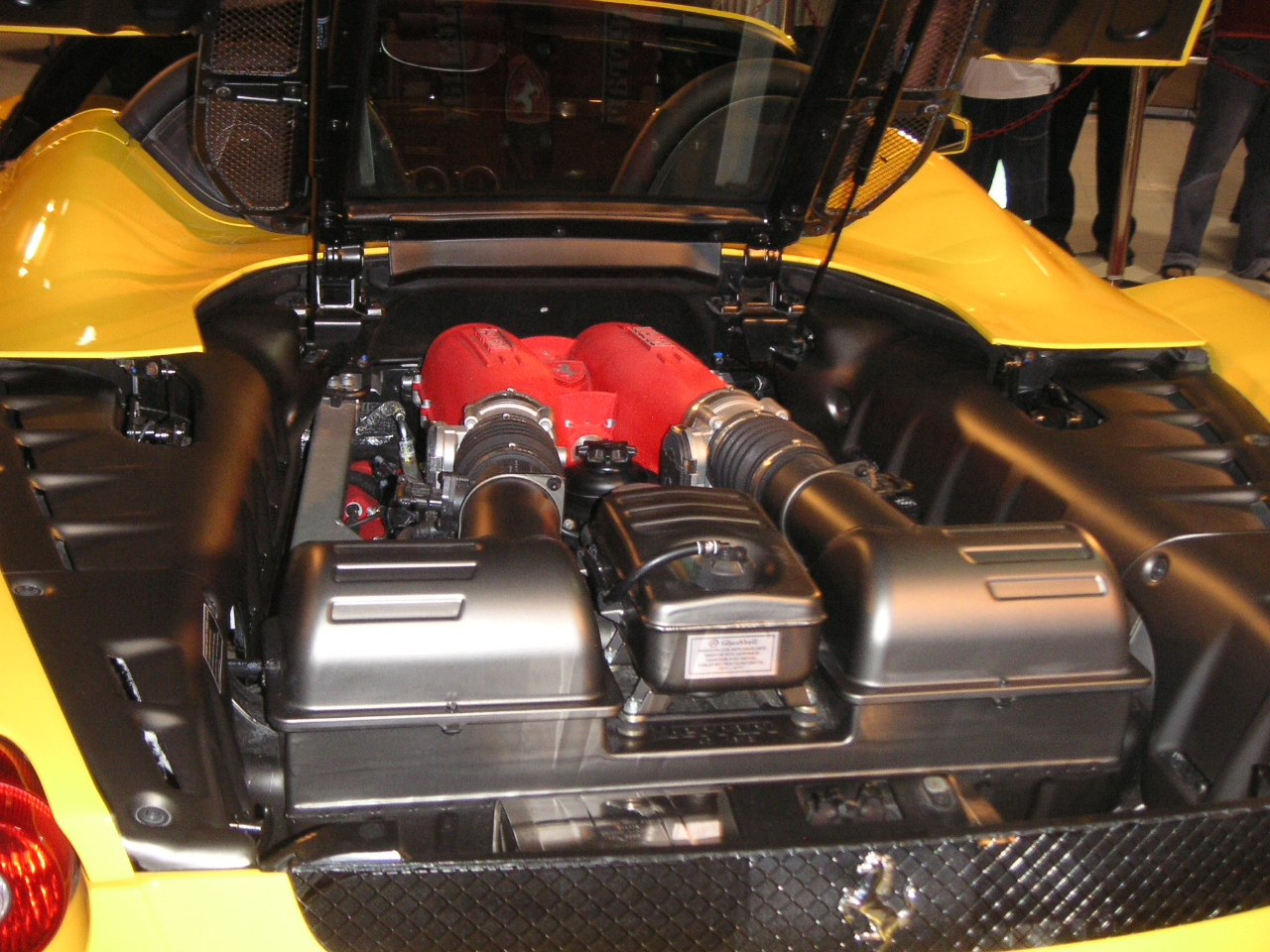
The Tipo F136 E V8 engine

Designed by Pininfarina in collaboration with Frank Stephenson (Director of Ferrari-Maserati Concept Design and Development), the body styling of the F430 was revised from its predecessor, the 360, to improve its aerodynamic efficiency. Although the drag coefficient remained the same, the downforce was greatly enhanced. Despite sharing the same basic Alcoa Aluminium chassis, roofline, doors, and glass, the car looked significantly different from the 360. A great extent of Ferrari heritage was included in the exterior design. At the rear, the Enzo's tail lights and engine cover vents were added. The car's name was etched on the Testarossa-styled driver's side mirror.

=== Engine ===
The F430 features a 4,308 cc (4.3 L) V8 engine of the "Ferrari-Maserati" F136 family. This new power plant was a significant change for Ferrari, as all previous Ferrari V8's were descendants of the Dino racing program of the 1950s. This fifty-year development cycle came to an end with the entirely new engine used in the F430, the architecture of which replaced the Dino-derived V12 in most other Ferrari cars. The engine's output specifications are: 490 PS (360 kW; 483 hp), at 8,500 rpm and 465 N⋅m (343 lb⋅ft) of torque at 5,250 rpm, 80% of which is available below 3,500 rpm. Despite a 20% increase in displacement, engine weight grew by only 4 kg (8.8 lb) along with a decrease in dimensions for easier packaging. The connecting rods, pistons and crankshaft were all entirely new, while the 4-valve cylinder head, valves and intake trumpets were directly retained from Formula 1 engines, for ideal volumetric efficiency. The F430 has a top speed in excess of 315 km/h (196 mph) and can accelerate from 0–60 mph (97 km/h) in 3.6 seconds, 0.6 seconds quicker than the old model.

=== Brakes ===
The brakes on the F430 were developed in close cooperation with Brembo and Bosch, resulting in a new cast-iron alloy for the discs. The new alloy includes molybdenum which has a better heat dissipation performance. The F430 was also available with the optional carbon fibre-reinforced silicon carbide (C/SiC) ceramic composite brake package. Ferrari claimed the carbon ceramic brakes will not fade even after 300-360 laps at their test track.

=== Features ===
The F430 featured the E-Diff, a computer-controlled limited-slip active differential which can vary the distribution of torque based on inputs such as steering angle and lateral acceleration.

Other notable features include the first application of Ferrari's manettino steering wheel-mounted control knob. Drivers can select from five different settings which modify the vehicle's ESC system, "Skyhook" electronic suspension, transmission behavior, throttle response, and E-Diff. The feature is similar to Land Rover's "Terrain Response" system.

The F1 automated manual transmission was built by Graziano Trasmissioni.

The Ferrari F430 was available with exclusive Goodyear Eagle F1 GSD3 EMT tires, which have a V-shaped tread design, run-flat capability, and OneTRED technology.

In the US, the company requested an exemption from the airbag design requirements, which was eventually granted, allowing the car to continue to be sold in the US.

== Variants ==
=== F430 Spider ===
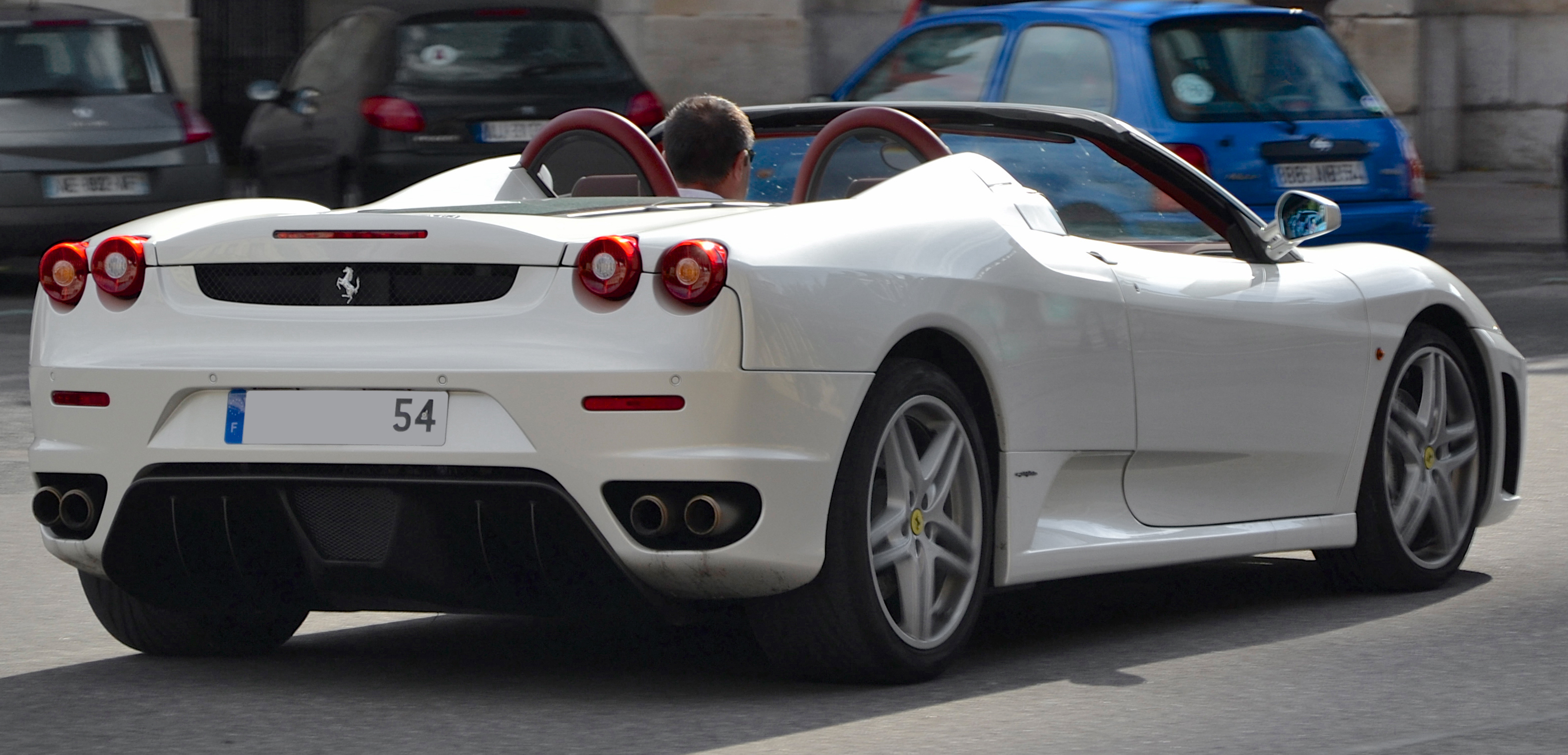
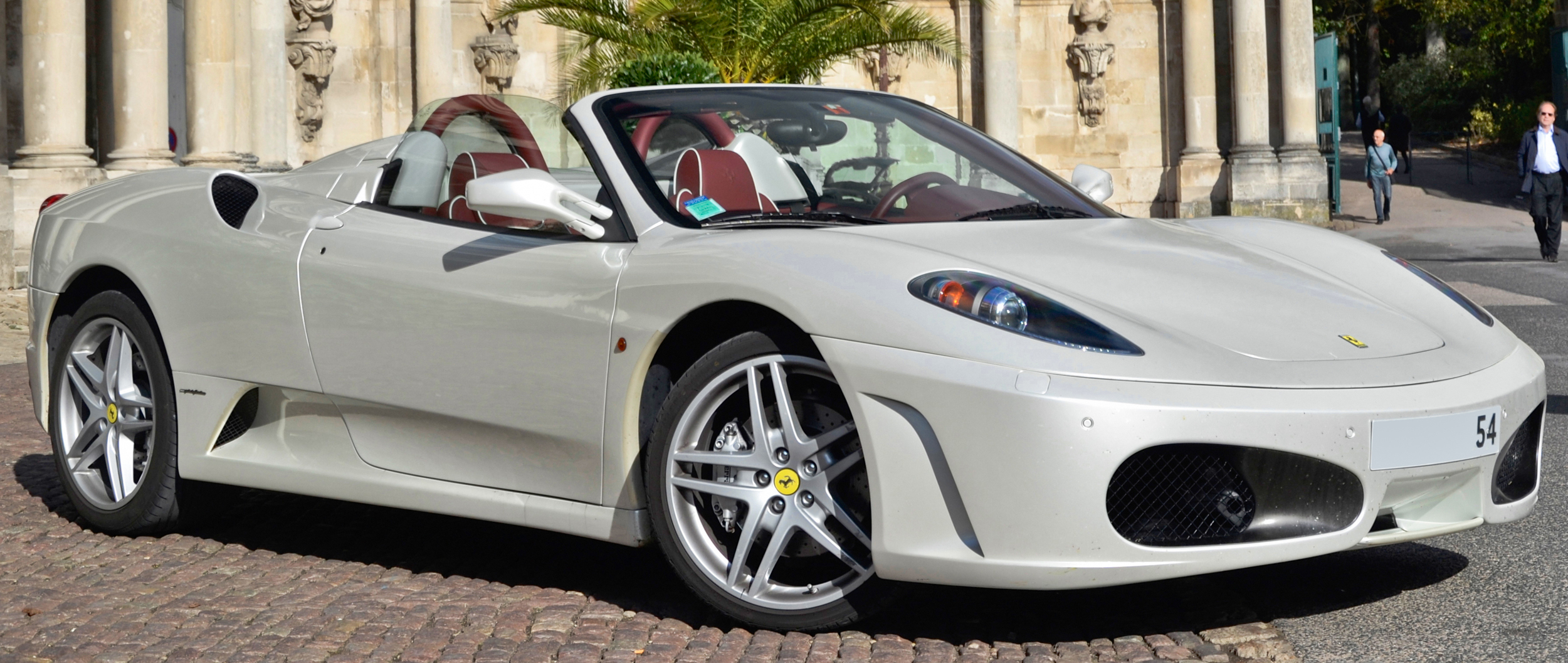
F430 Spider

The F430 Spider is the convertible version of the F430. It was unveiled at the 2005 Geneva Motor Show, making it Ferrari's 21st road-going convertible. The car was designed by Pininfarina with aerodynamic simulation programs used for Formula 1 cars. The conversion from a closed top to an open-air convertible is a two-stage folding-action; the roof panel automatically folds away inside a space above the engine bay. The interior and performance of the Spider are identical to that of the coupé with an increase in the weight and decrease in the top speed by 5 km/h (3 mph).

=== 430 Scuderia ===
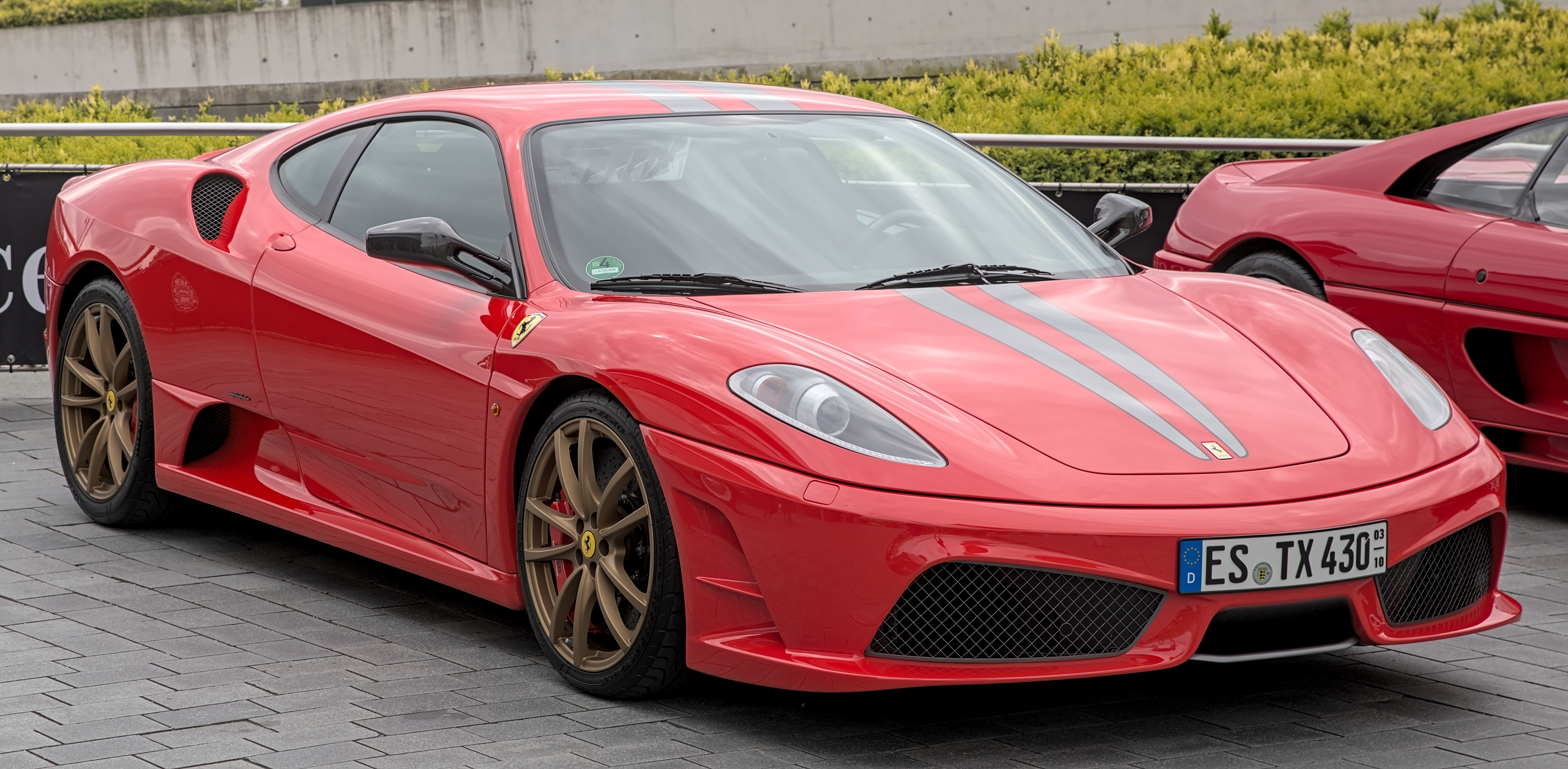
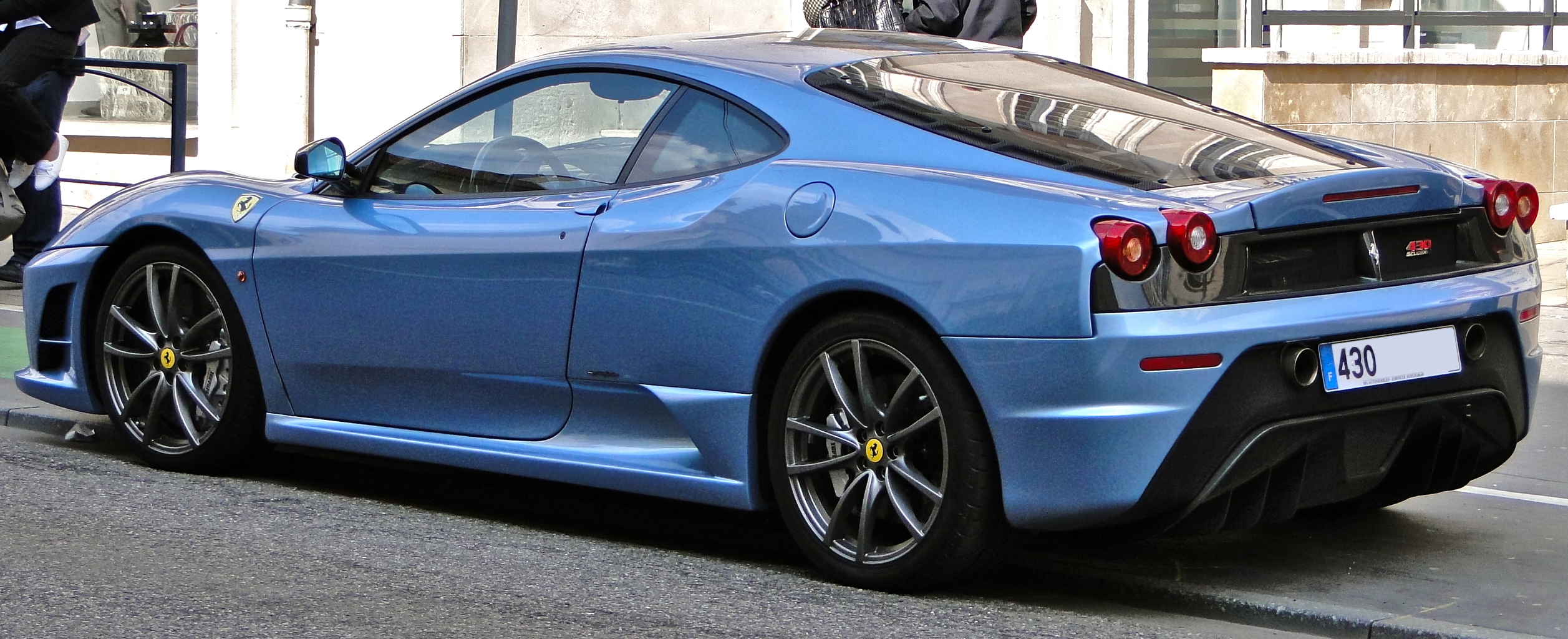
430 Scuderia

Serving as the successor to the 360 Challenge Stradale, the 430 Scuderia (scuderia meaning "stable", but also used in the context of motor racing teams, including Ferrari's own) was unveiled by Michael Schumacher at the 2007 Frankfurt Auto Show. Aimed to compete with cars like the Porsche 911 GT2 and the Lamborghini Gallardo Superleggera (superleggera meaning super light weight), it is lighter (by 100 kg (220 lb)) and more powerful (510 PS (375 kW; 503 hp) at 8,500 rpm and 471 N⋅m (347 lb⋅ft) of torque at 5,250 rpm) than the standard F430. Increased power comes from a revised intake, exhaust, and an ion-sensing knock-detection system that allows for a higher compression ratio in the engine. Thus the weight-to-power ratio is reduced from 2.96 kg/hp to 2.5 kg/hp. In addition to the weight saving measures, the Scuderia's single-clutch automated manual gained improved "Superfast" software, known as "Superfast2", for faster 60 millisecond shift times. A new traction control system combined the F1-Trac traction from the 599 GTB and stability control with the E-Diff electronic differential. The Ferrari 430 Scuderia accelerates from 0-60 mph (97 km/h) in 3.1 seconds with a top speed of 319 km/h (198 mph).

=== Scuderia Spider 16M ===
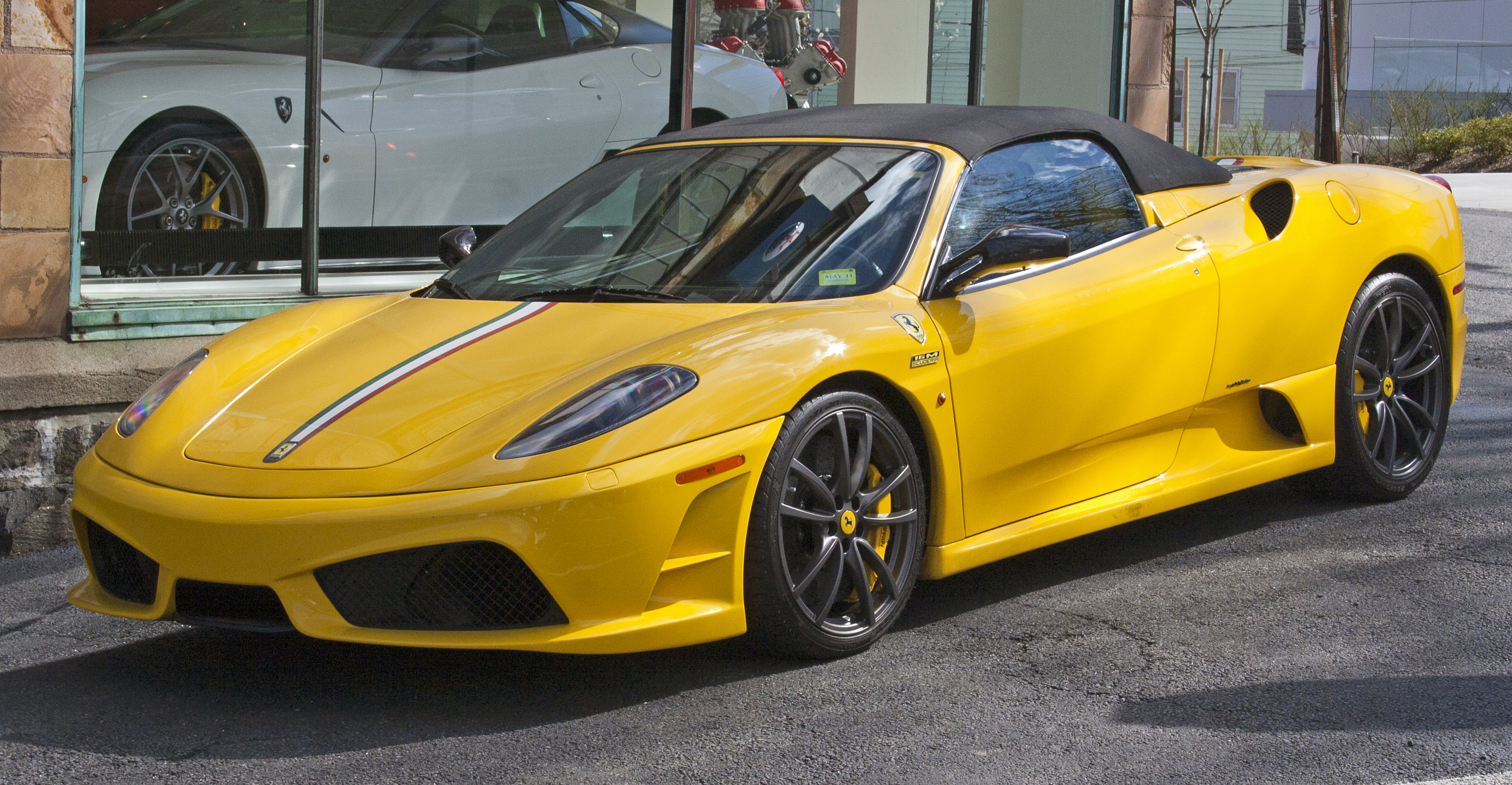
Scuderia Spider 16M with the 16M Stripe

To commemorate Ferrari's 16th victory in the Formula 1 Constructor's World Championship in 2008, Ferrari unveiled the Scuderia Spider 16M at World Finals in Mugello. It is a convertible version of the 430 Scuderia.

The engine is rated at 510 PS (375 kW; 503 hp) at 8,500 rpm and 471 N⋅m (347 lb⋅ft) of torque at 5,250 rpm. The car has a dry weight of 1,340 kg (2,954 lb) (80 kg (176 lb) lighter than the F430 Spider) and a kerb weight of 1,440 kg (3,175 lb). The chassis was stiffened to cope with the extra performance available and the car featured many carbon fibre parts and weight saving measures as standard such as lightened front and rear bumpers. Unique 5-spoke forged wheels were specifically produced for the 16M and helped to considerably reduce unsprung weight with larger front brakes and calipers added for extra stopping power (also featured on 430 Scuderia). It accelerates from 0-60 mph (97 km/h) in 3.4 seconds, with a top speed of 315 km/h (196 mph).

499 cars were produced beginning early 2009 and all were pre-sold to select clients.

== Special editions ==
=== F430 Spider Bio Fuel ===
A version of the F430 Spider that runs on ethanol, called the F430 Spider Bio Fuel, was on display at the 2008 Detroit Auto Show. It had the same 4.3 litre V8 engine as the standard car, producing 500 hp (373 kW), with a 4% increase in torque and with 5% less carbon dioxide emissions than the standard F430 Spider.

=== SP1 ===
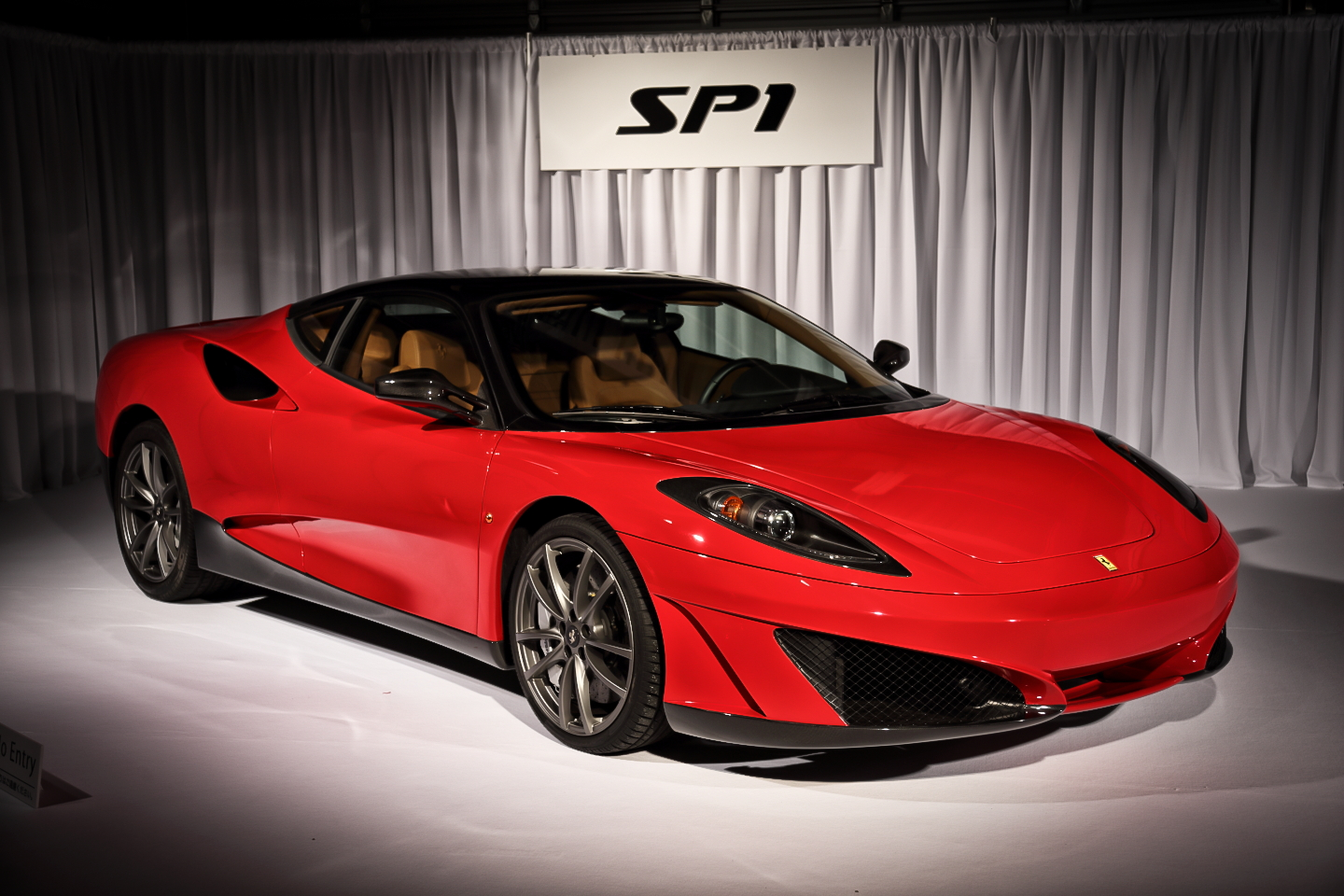
Ferrari SP1

The F430-based Ferrari SP1 (Special Project Number 1), was the first one-off special produced by the Ferrari Portfolio Coachbuilding Programme, also known as the Special Projects Programme (SP). The body was designed by former Pininfarina designer Leonardo Fioravanti, at the behest of Junichiro Hiramatsu, a Japanese businessman who was the former president of the Ferrari Club of Japan and an avid collector; he had admired Fioravanti's 1998 F100 prototype.

== Racing ==
=== F430 Challenge ===
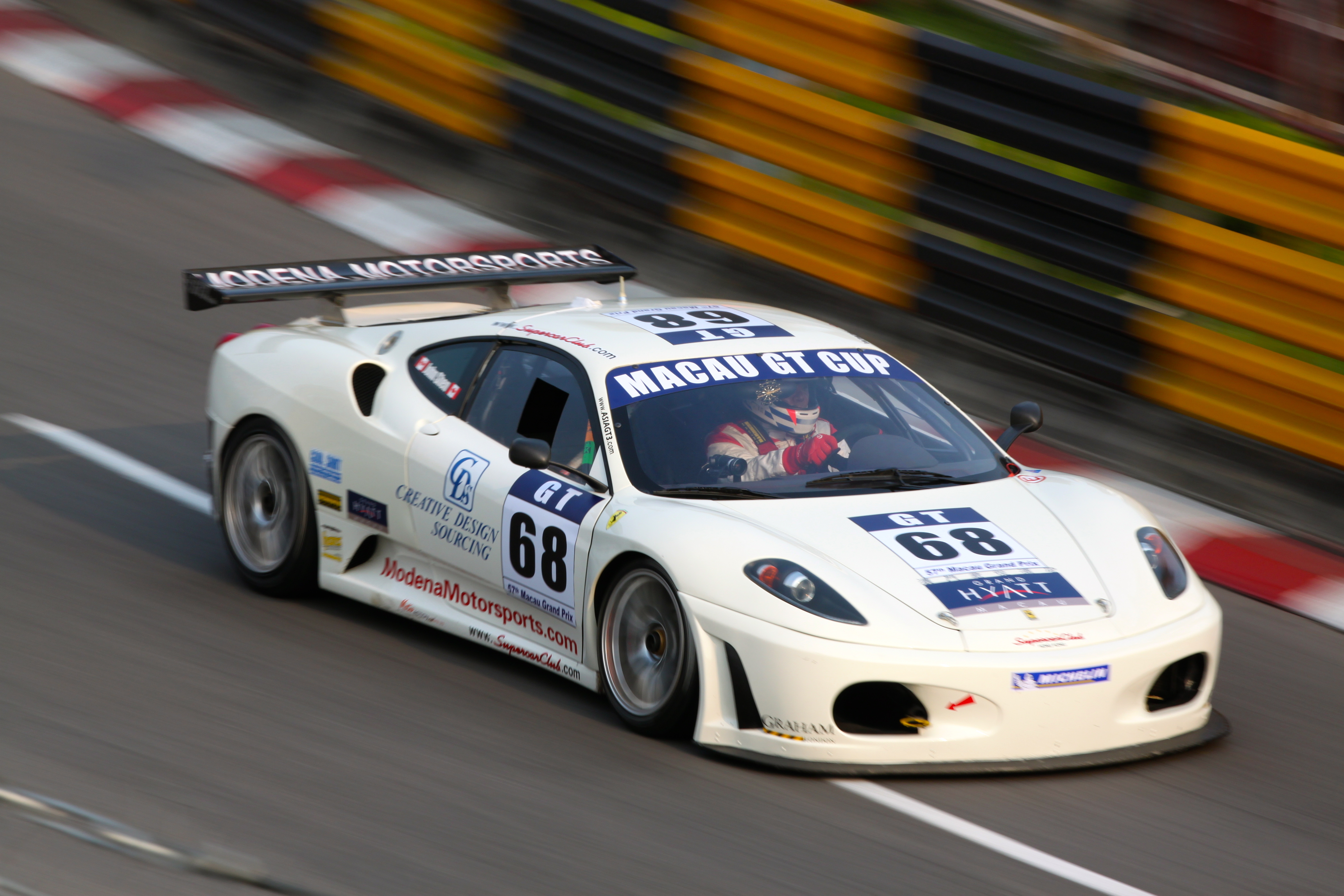
Ferrari F430 Challenge at the Macau Grand Prix event

The F430 Challenge is the track version of the F430, designed for the Ferrari Challenge. The engine remained untouched but the vehicle's weight was reduced and the transmission and suspension were changed. The production model was unveiled at the Los Angeles Auto Show in January 2005.

=== F430 GTC ===
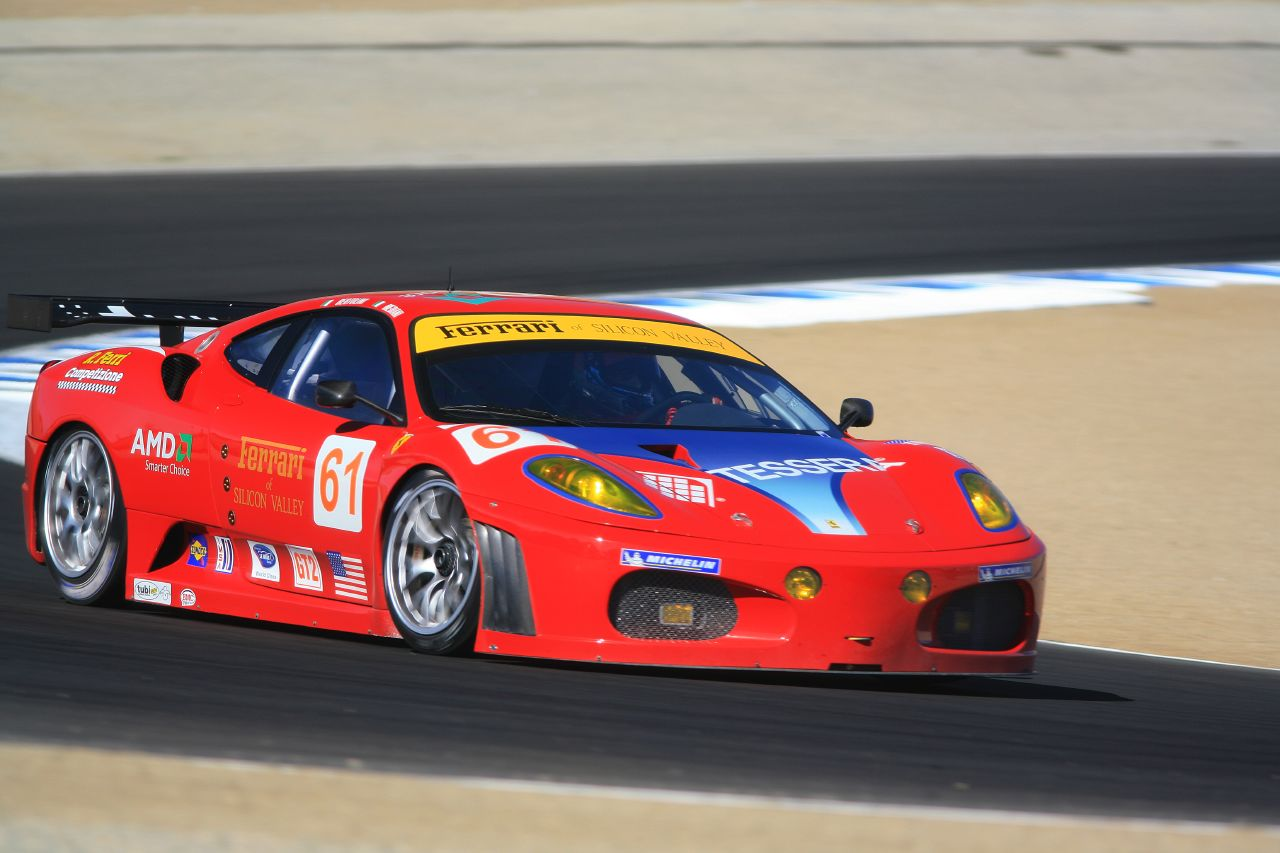
Risi Competizione's Ferrari F430GT

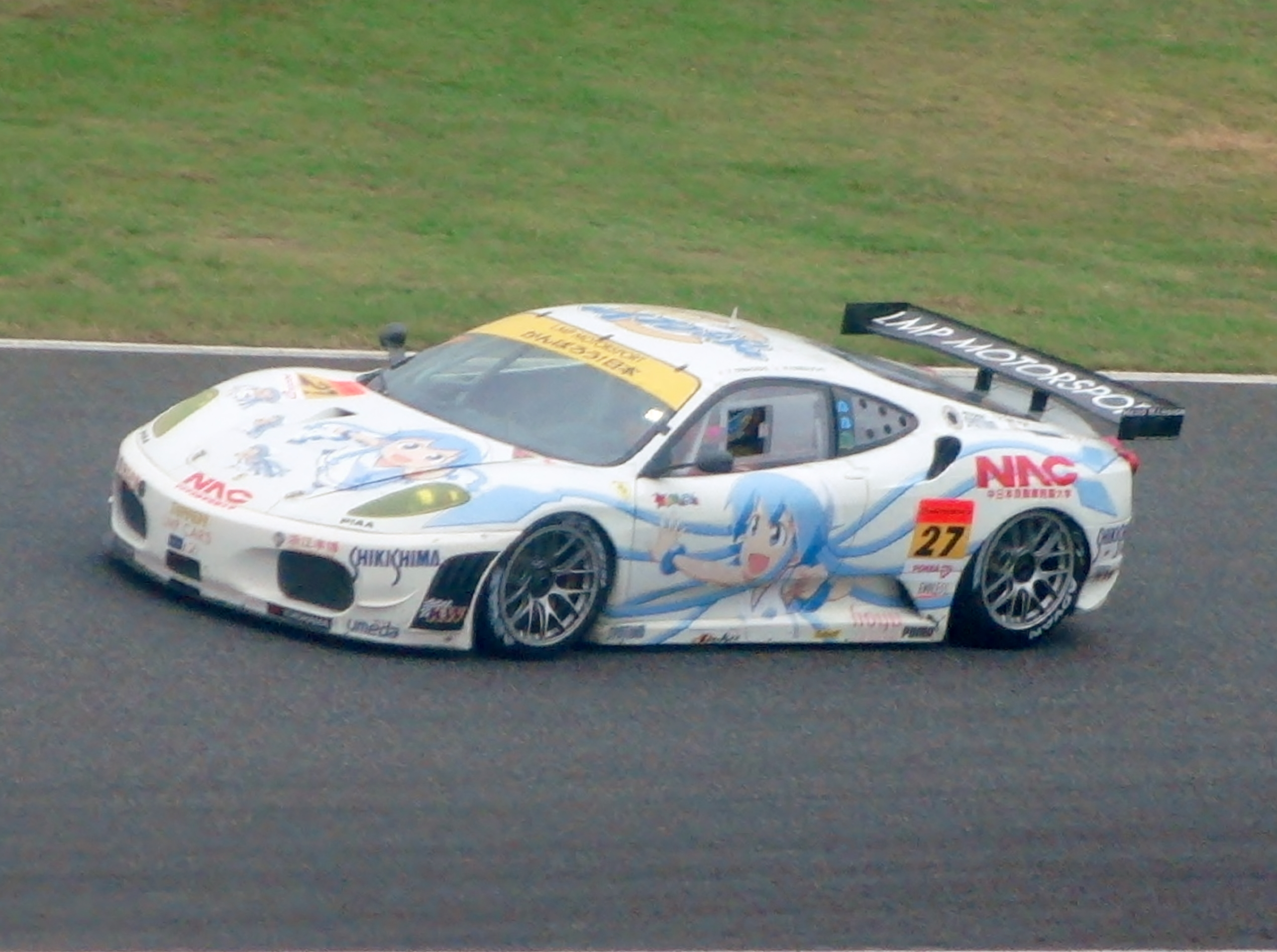
NAC's F430 GTC at the 2011 Pokka GT Summer Special

Built since 2006 by Ferrari Corse Clienti department in collaboration with Michelotto, the F430 GTC is a racing car designed to compete in international GT2 class competition, such as in the American Le Mans Series, Le Mans Series, and FIA GT Championship. F430 GTCs also compete at the 24 Hours of Le Mans. The GTC was the fastest and most developed racing version of the F430.

In FIA GT2 championship, in order to render the car performances more uniform, the cars are forced to run with a specific minimum weight and with an engine restrictor that depends on the engine displacement. Hence Ferrari destroked the 4.3 L V8 engine to 4.0 L in order to compete in the 3.8–4.0 L class in GT2 class racing, which is allowed to race with a minimum weight of 1,100 kg (2,425 lb). In this race configuration, the engine produces somewhat less power, at 327 kW (445 PS; 439 hp). If they were to use the 4.3-litre engine, the minimum weight of the F430 would increase by 50 kg (110 lb), and the 4.0-litre engine thus yields a better power-to-weight ratio.

The F430 GTCs won their class championships in the ALMS and FIA GT, as well as scoring class wins at the 2007, 2009 and 2010 12 Hours of Sebring, at the 2008 and 2009 24 Hours of Le Mans, at the 2006, 2008, and 2009 24 Hours of Spa and at the 2008 and 2009 Petit Le Mans.

=== F430 GT3 ===
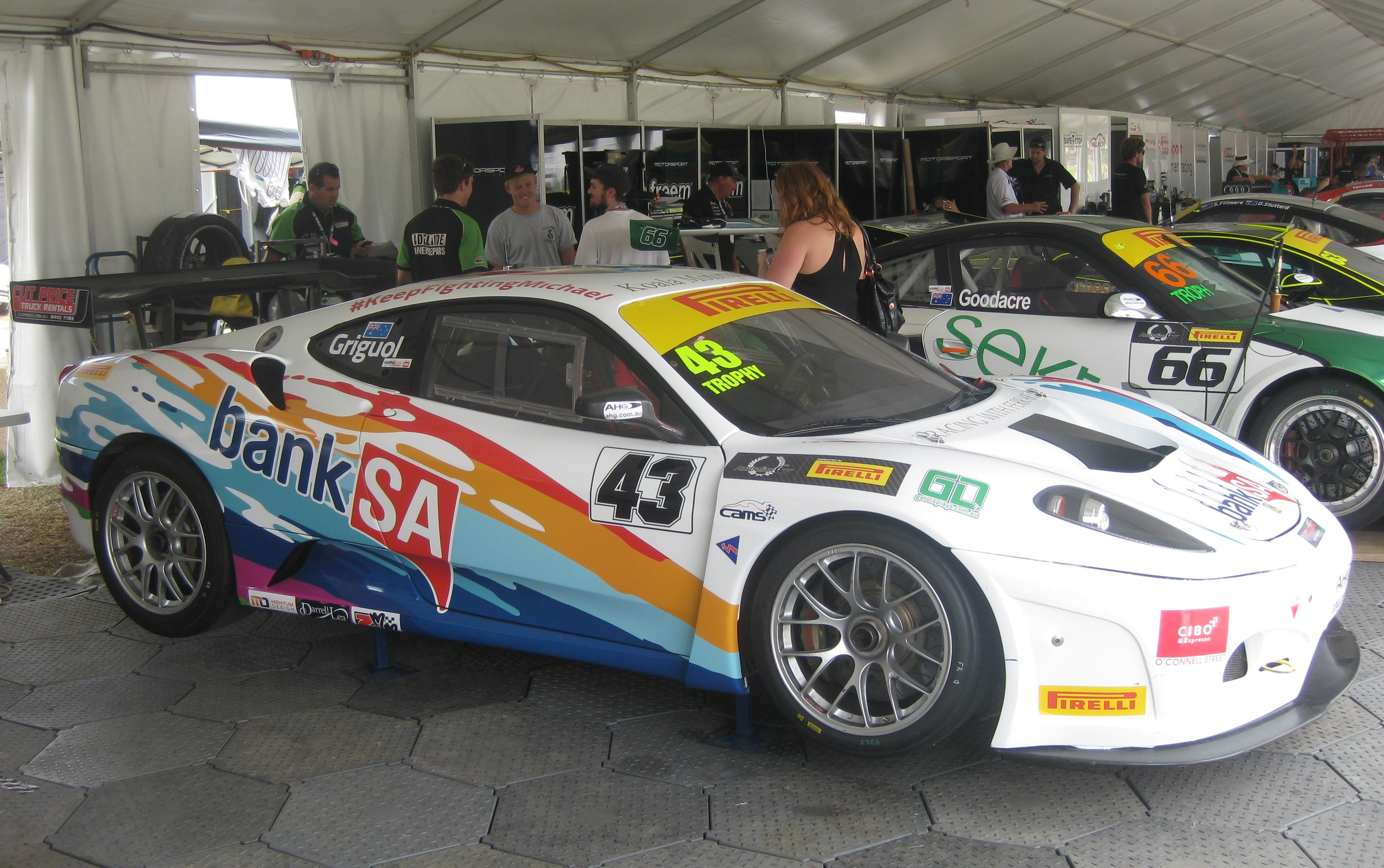
Ferrari F430 GT3

Originally based on the F430 Challenge, the F430 GT3 is a specialised racing car developed in 2006 by JMB Racing for the FIA GT3 European Championship and other national GT championships such as British GT and FFSA GT. It is mechanically similar to the F430 Challenge but has better-developed aerodynamics and more power.

The car uses the same 4.3 L V8 engine, tuned to produce 410 kW; 558 PS (550 hp), making the GT3 more powerful than its GT2 counterpart. However, due to the GT3 regulations stating that the car must have a power-to-weight ratio of around 2.6 kg/hp, the car weighs 1,219 kg (2,687 lb) in race trim (driver and fuel excluded), which is roughly 119 kg (262 lb) more than the GT2 spec car. Despite the higher power, it is significantly slower than the GT2 version; for example, in the 2007 Spa 24 Hours endurance race, in which both models were entered, the GT3 spec vehicles' best qualification time was around 8 seconds slower per lap than that set by the GT2 spec vehicle.

=== 430 GT3 Scuderia ===
Developed by Kessel Racing for the 2009 FIA GT3 European Championship season, the 430 GT3 Scuderia is the successor of the previous F430 GT3. Based upon the 430 Scuderia, a total of 54 chassis were upgraded to Scuderia spec, featuring significant bodywork and aerodynamics changes. The Scuderia Evo package was applied to only 25 chassis and the most prominent improvement was to the aerodynamic efficiency to ensure the car remained competitive.

=== Race Victories ===
Year	No.	Event	Circuit	Series	Class	Entrant
2006	1	Utah Grand Prix	(United States) Miller Motorsports Park	ALMS	GT2	Risi Competizione
2006	2	Portland Grand Prix	(United States) Portland International Raceway	ALMS	GT2	Risi Competizione
2006	3	Grand Prix of Mosport	(Canada) Mosport International Raceway	ALMS	GT2	Risi Competizione
2006	4	Monterey Sports Car Championships	(United States) Mazda Raceway Laguna Seca	ALMS	GT2	Risi Competizione
2006	5	Paul Ricard Supercar 500	(France) Paul Ricard HTTT	FIA GT	GT2	Scuderia Ecosse
2006	6	Tourist Trophy	(United Kingdom) Silverstone Circuit	FIA GT	GT2	AF Corse
2006	7	Brno 500km	(Czech Republic) Brno Circuit	FIA GT	GT2	JMB Racing
2006	8	Oschersleben 500km	(Germany) Motorsport Arena Oschersleben	FIA GT	GT2	Scuderia Ecosse
2006	9	Spa 24 Hours	(Belgium) Circuit de Spa-Francorchamps	FIA GT	GT2	AF Corse
2006	10	Dijon 500km	(France) Circuit de Dijon-Prenois	FIA GT	GT2	AF Corse
2006	11	Budapest 500km	(Hungary) Hungaroring	FIA GT	GT2	Scuderia Ecosse
2006	12	Adria 500 km	(Italy) Adria International Raceway	FIA GT	GT2	Scuderia Ecosse
2006	13	Dubai 500 km	(United Arab Emirates) Dubai Autodrome	FIA GT	GT2	Scuderia Ecosse
2006	14	Round 1	(United Kingdom) Oulton Park	BGTC	GT2	Scuderia Ecosse
2006	15	Round 2	(United Kingdom) Oulton Park	BGTC	GT2	Scuderia Ecosse
2006	16	Round 3	(United Kingdom) Donington Park	BGTC	GT2	Scuderia Ecosse
2006	17	Round 8	(United Kingdom) Snetterton	BGTC	GT2	Scuderia Ecosse
2006	18	Round 9	(United Kingdom) Snetterton	BGTC	GT2	Scuderia Ecosse
2006	19	Round 10	(United Kingdom) Rockingham	BGTC	GT2	Scuderia Ecosse
2006	20	Round 11	(United Kingdom) Rockingham	BGTC	GT2	Scuderia Ecosse
2006	21	Round 12	(United Kingdom) Brands Hatch	BGTC	GT2	Scuderia Ecosse
2006	22	Round 13	(United Kingdom) Brands Hatch	BGTC	GT2	Scuderia Ecosse
2006	23	Round 14	(United Kingdom) Silverstone	BGTC	GT2	Scuderia Ecosse
2007	24	Mobil 1 12 Hours of Sebring	(United States) Sebring International Raceway	ALMS	GT2	Risi Competizione
2007	25	Acura Sports Car Challenge of St. Petersburg	(United States) Streets of St. Petersburg	ALMS	GT2	Risi Competizione
2007	26	Toyota Grand Prix of Long Beach	(United States) Long Beach Street Circuit	ALMS	GT2	Risi Competizione
2007	27	1000km Monza	(Italy) Autodromo Nazionale di Monza	LMS	GT2	GPC Sport
2007	28	Sugo 1000 km	(Japan) Sportsland SUGO	JLMC	GT2	Team Kawamura
2007	29	Fuji 1000 km	(Japan) Fuji Speedway	JLMC	GT2	Team Kawamura
2007	30	Motegi 1000 km	(Japan) Twin Ring Motegi	JLMC	GT2	Team Kawamura
2007	31	1000 km Nürburgring	(Germany) Nürburgring	LMS	GT2	Virgo Motorsport
2007	32	1000 km Silverstone	(United Kingdom) Silverstone Circuit	LMS	GT2	Virgo Motorsport
2007	33	Lone Star Grand Prix	(United States) Reliant Park	ALMS	GT2	Risi Competizione
2007	34	Utah Grand Prix	(United States) Miller Motorsports Park	ALMS	GT2	Petersen/White Lightning
2007	35	Zhuhai 2 Hours	(China) Zhuhai International Circuit	FIA GT	GT2	AF Corse
2007	36	Tourist Trophy	(United Kingdom) Silverstone Circuit	FIA GT	GT2	AF Corse
2007	37	Bucharest 2 Hours	(Romania) Bucharest Ring	FIA GT	GT2	AF Corse
2007	38	Monza 2 Hours	(Italy) Autodromo Nazionale Monza	FIA GT	GT2	AF Corse
2007	39	Oschersleben 2 Hours	(Germany) Motorsport Arena Oschersleben	FIA GT	GT2	AF Corse
2007	40	Total 24 Hours of Spa	(Belgium) Circuit de Spa-Francorchamps	FIA GT	Coupe du Roi	JMB Racing
2007	41	Adria 2 Hours	(Italy) Adria International Raceway	FIA GT	GT2	AF Corse
2007	42	Brno 2 Hours	(Czech Republic) Brno Circuit	FIA GT	GT2	AF Corse
2007	43	Nogaro 2 Hours	(France) Circuit Paul Armagnac	FIA GT	GT2	AF Corse
2007	44	Zolder 2 Hours	(Belgium) Circuit Zolder	FIA GT	GT2	AF Corse
2007	45	Generac 500 at Road America	(United States) Road America	ALMS	GT2	Risi Competizione
2007	46	Mobil 1 presents Grand Prix of Mosport	(Canada) Mosport International Raceway	ALMS	GT2	Risi Competizione
2007	47	Sandown GT Classic	(Australia) Sandown International Motor Raceway	AGTC	-	Sirena Racing
2007	48	Detroit Sports Car Challenge	(United States) Belle Isle Street Circuit	ALMS	GT2	Risi Competizione
2007	49	Monterey Sports Car Championships	(United States) Mazda Raceway Laguna Seca	ALMS	GT2	Risi Competizione
2007	50	Round 1	(United Kingdom) Oulton Park	BGTC	GT3	Christians in Motorsport
2007	51	Round 8	(United Kingdom) Silverstone	BGTC	GT3	Christians in Motorsport
2007	52	Round 11	(United Kingdom) Croft	BGTC	GT3	Christians in Motorsport
2007	53	Round 12	(United Kingdom) Croft	BGTC	GT3	Christians in Motorsport
2008	54	Acura Sports Car Challenge of St. Petersburg	(United States) Streets of St. Petersburg	ALMS	GT2	Tafel Racing
2008	55	1000 km of Catalunya	(Spain) Circuit de Catalunya	LMS	GT2	Virgo Motorsport
2008	56	Tequila Patron American Le Mans Series at Long Beach	(United States) Long Beach Street Circuit	ALMS	GT2	Tafel Racing
2008	57	1000 km of Spa	(Belgium) Circuit de Spa-Francorchamps	LMS	GT2	Virgo Motorsport
2008	58	RAC Tourist Trophy	(United Kingdom) Silverstone Circuit	FIA GT	GT2	AF Corse
2008	59	24 Hours of Le Mans	(France) Circuit de la Sarthe	24LM	GT2	Risi Competizione
2008	60	Adria 2 Hours	(Italy) Adria International Raceway	FIA GT	GT2	AF Corse
2008	61	Oschersleben 2 Hours	(Germany) Motorsport Arena Oschersleben	FIA GT	GT2	AF Corse
2008	62	24 Hours of Spa	(Belgium) Circuit de Spa-Francorchamps	FIA GT	GT2	BMS Scuderia Italia
2008	63	Bucharest City Challenge Race 1	(Romania) Bucharest Ring	FIA GT	GT2	CR Scuderia Racing
2008	64	Bucharest City Challenge Race 2	(Romania) Bucharest Ring	FIA GT	GT2	CR Scuderia Racing
2008	65	1000 km of Nürburgring	(Germany) Nürburgring	LMS	GT2	Virgo Motorsport
2008	66	1000 km of Silverstone	(United Kingdom) Silverstone Circuit	LMS	GT2	Virgo Motorsport
2008	67	Brno 2 Hours	(Czech Republic) Masaryk Circuit	FIA GT	GT2	AF Corse
2008	68	Zolder 2 Hours	(Belgium) Circuit Zolder	FIA GT	GT2	AF Corse
2008	69	San Luis 2 Hours	(Argentina) Potrero de los Funes Circuit	FIA GT	GT2	Advanced Engineering Pecom Racing Team / AF Corse
2008	70	Acura Sports Car Challenge of Mid-Ohio	(United States) Mid-Ohio Sports Car Course	ALMS	GT2	Tafel Racing
2008	71	Grand Prix of Mosport	(United States) Mosport International Raceway	ALMS	GT2	Risi Competizione
2008	72	Petit Le Mans	(United States) Road Atlanta	ALMS	GT2	Risi Competizione
2008	73	Monterey Sports Car Championships	(United States) Mazda Raceway Laguna Seca	ALMS	GT2	Tafel Racing
2008	74	Round 1	(United Kingdom) Oulton Park	BGTC	GT3	CR Scuderia
2008	75	Round 3	(United Kingdom) Knockhill	BGTC	GT3	CR Scuderia
2008	76	Round 4	(United Kingdom) Knockhill	BGTC	GT3	CR Scuderia
2008	77	Round 9	(United Kingdom) Thruxton	BGTC	GT3	Christians in Motorsport
2008	78	Round 12	(United Kingdom) Brands Hatch	BGTC	GT3	CR Scuderia
2008	79	Round 13	(United Kingdom) Silverstone	BGTC	GT3	CR Scuderia
2008	80	Round 14	(United Kingdom) Donington Park	BGTC	GT3	CR Scuderia
2009	81	12 Hours of Sebring	(United States) Sebring International Raceway	ALMS	GT2	Risi Competizione
2009	82	Petit Le Mans	(United States) Road Atlanta	ALMS	GT2	Risi Competizione
2009	83	24 Hours of Le Mans	(France) Circuit de la Sarthe	24LM	GT2	Risi Competizione
2009	84	Oschersleben 2 Hours	(Germany) Motorsport Arena Oschersleben	FIA GT	GT2	AF Corse
2009	85	24 Hours of Spa	(Belgium) Circuit de Spa-Francorchamps	FIA GT	GT2	AF Corse
2009	86	1000 km of Algarve	(Portugal) Autodromo Internacional do Algarve	LMS	GT2	JMW Motorsport
2009	87	1000 km of Silverstone	(United Kingdom) Silverstone Circuit	LMS	GT2	JMW Motorsport
2009	88	1000 km of Okayama (Race 2)	(Japan) Okayama International Circuit	ALMS*	GT2	Hankook Team Farnbacher
2009	89	Algarve 2 Hours	(Portugal) Autodromo Internacional do Algarve	FIA GT	GT2	AF Corse
2009	90	Paul Ricard 2 Hours	(France) Circuit Paul Ricard	FIA GT	GT2	AF Corse
2009	91	Round 10	(United Kingdom) Snetterton	BGTC	GT3	Rosso Verde
2009	92	Round 12	(United Kingdom) Silverstone	BGTC	GT3	MTech Racing
2010	93	12 Hours of Sebring	(United States) Sebring International Raceway	ALMS	GT	Risi Competizione
2010	94	Utah Grand Prix	(United States) Miller Motorsports Park	ALMS	GT	Risi Competizione
2010	95	Mid-Ohio Sports Car Challenge	(United States) Mid-Ohio Sports Car Course	ALMS	GT	Risi Competizione
2010	96	Valencia R1	(Spain) Circuit Ricardo Tormo	IGTO	Super GT	AF Corse
2010	97	Valencia R2	(Spain) Circuit Ricardo Tormo	IGTO	Super GT	AF Corse
2010	98	Valencia R2	(Spain) Circuit Ricardo Tormo	IGTO	GTS	Kessel Racing
2010	99	Nurburgring R1	(Germany) Nurburgring	IGTO	GTS	Luxury Racing
2010	100	Nurburgring R2	(Germany) Nurburgring	IGTO	Super GT	AF Corse
2010	101	Nurburgring R2	(Germany) Nurburgring	IGTO	GTS	Luxury Racing
2010	102	Imola R1	(Italy) Autodromo Enzo e Dino Ferrari	IGTO	Super GT	AF Corse
2010	103	Imola R1	(Italy) Autodromo Enzo e Dino Ferrari	IGTO	GTS	Kessel Racing
2010	104	Imola R2	(Italy) Autodromo Enzo e Dino Ferrari	IGTO	Super GT	CRS Racing
2010	105	Imola R2	(Italy) Autodromo Enzo e Dino Ferrari	IGTO	GTS	Luxury Racing
2010	106	Spa R1	(Belgium) Circuit de Spa-Francorchamps	IGTO	GTS	Kessel Racing
2010	107	Spa R2	(Belgium) Circuit de Spa-Francorchamps	IGTO	Super GT	CRS Racing
2010	109	Magny-Cours R1	(France) Circuit de Nevers Magny-Cours	IGTO	GTS	Kessel Racing
2010	110	Magny-Cours R2	(France) Circuit de Nevers Magny-Cours	IGTO	GTS	Luxury Racing
2010	111	Brands Hatch R1	(United Kingdom) Brands Hatch	IGTO	GTS	MTech Racing
2010	112	Brands Hatch R2	(United Kingdom) Brands Hatch	IGTO	GTS	Kessel Racing
2010	113	Monza R1	(Italy) Autodromo Nazionale Monza	IGTO	GTS	Kessel Racing
2010	114	Monza R2	(Italy) Autodromo Nazionale Monza	IGTO	GTS	Kessel Racing
2010	115	Catalunya R1	(Spain) Circuit de Catalunya	IGTO	GTS	Kessel Racing
2010	116	Catalunya R2	(Spain) Circuit de Catalunya	IGTO	GTS	Kessel Racing
2010	117	Round 1	(United Kingdom) Oulton Park	BGTC	GT3	MTech Racing
2010	118	Round 2	(United Kingdom) Oulton Park	BGTC	GT3	MTech Racing
2010	119	Round 9	(United Kingdom) Snetterton	BGTC	GT3	Chad Racing
2010	120	Round 10	(United Kingdom) Snetterton	BGTC	GT3	MTech Racing
2010	121	Round 13	(United Kingdom) Donington Park	BGTC	GT3	Rosso Verde
2011	122	Imola R2	(Italy) Autodromo Enzo e Dino Ferrari	IGTO	GTS	Kessel Racing
2011	123	Magny-Cours R1	(France) Circuit de Nevers Magny-Cours	IGTO	GTS	Kessel Racing
2011	124	Spa R1	(Belgium) Circuit de Spa-Francorchamps	IGTO	GTS	Kessel Racing
2011	125	Red Bull Ring R2	(Austria) Red Bull Ring	IGTO	GTS	Kessel Racing
2011	126	Catalunya R2	(Spain) Circuit de Catalunya	IGTO	GTS	Kessel Racing
2011	127	Round 8	(United Kingdom) Rockingham	BGTC	GT3	CRS Racing

^{*}Asian Le Mans Series, not to be confused with American Le Mans Series.

== Recall ==
In February 2009, Ferrari recalled about 2,000 (2005–2007) F430 Spiders in the U.S., due to the risk that heat from the engine could cause the convertible top's hydraulic hoses to fracture and leak flammable fluid onto the engine, resulting in a fire.
