= Adam Wilcox (racing driver) =

British racing driver (born 1976)

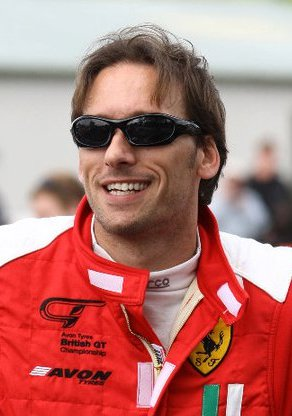
Adam Wilcox

Adam Adrian Wilcox (born 26 June 1976) is a British racing driver.

== History ==
Adam Wilcox has been racing since he was eight years old and has won eight major championship titles. Starting in karting, by 1994 he became the 250cc FIA European Karting Champion which he sealed at the Osterichring in Austria and moved onto Car racing in 1995, driving a Formula Renault car with Haywood Racing finishing 4th in his first car racing season against some very experienced opposition. He went through the Junior ranks competing in the UK Formula Vauxhall Championship finishing runner-up in 1996 and in 1997 finished runner-up in the European Formula Opel Series which was the support series for the 1997 F1 World Championship, he reached Formula 3 in 1998, he became a test driver for F3000 cars at the end of 1998 and continued this into 1999 as well as competing in the 1999 Formula Palmer Audi Series before switching to GT Style racing in 2000.

Wilcox's GT racing career started by winning the new one make Lotus Sport Elise Championship in 2000, and then backed by ADVAN/Yokohama Tyres he moved to Japan to compete in the All Japan GT Championship for three years during the 2001–2003 seasons, driving a Porsche GT3R and a Nismo Nissan S15 before moving back to the UK in 2004 and winning the British GTC Championship in a DRM Racing Ferrari F360 GTC.

Wilcox's most notable achievements are finishing Vice Champion in the 1997 Formula Opel Euroseries which was the supporting series for the 1997 FIA Formula One World Championship and being nominated as one of the McLaren/Autosport young drivers of the year. He also won the Lotus Sport Elise Championship in 2000 by taking nine lights to flag race victories. Other achievements were winning the 2001 Suzuka GTC 1000k event and finishing sixth in the 2002 GT300 Japanese GT Championship driving a Porsche GT3R, as well as winning the 2004 British GTC Championship driving a Ferrari 360 alongside Portuguese driver Ni Amorim. And being appointed as a full member of the prestigious British Racing Driver Club.

After winning the 2004 British GTC Championship, Wilcox continued to be a front running driver in the British GT Championship racing alongside car owner Phil Burton over 10 seasons and has scored numerous Pole Positions, Fastest Laps and Podium finishes in the GT3 category.
