= Christopher Hyman =

South African businessman

- Born: Christopher Rajendran Hyman; 5 July 1963 (age 62); Durban, South Africa
- Education: Natal University
- Occupation: Businessman
- Years active: 1984–present
- Title: CEO, Serco Group
- Term: 2002–2013
- Successor: Rupert Soames
- Spouse: Lianne Hyman
- Children: 2 (incl. Raoul)

Christopher Rajendran Hyman CBE (born 5 July 1963) is a South African businessman. He was chief executive (CEO) of Serco Group from 2002 to October 2013.

== Career ==
On graduation, he worked for Arthur Andersen. In 1989, he won an 18-month exchange with Ernst & Young in London, who employed him after four months. headhunted in 1994 by Serco, Hyman became European finance director, and in 1999 was made group finance director. In 2002, Hyman became chief executive.

Hyman was appointed Commander of the Order of the British Empire (CBE) in the 2010 Birthday Honours for services to business and charity.

Hyman resigned from his role of CEO of Serco in October 2013 following allegations that Serco had overcharged government customers.

== Racing driver ==
Hyman is a motor racing fan and has competed in the Formula Palmer Audi series and the FIA GT3 European Championship.

== Personal life ==
Married to fellow South African Lianne, the couple have two children. His son Raoul is also a racing driver. He was on the 47th floor of the World Trade Center at the time of the September 11 attacks in 2001.
