= 2009 International GT Open =

Fourth GT Open season

Seasons
- ← 2008 2010 →

The 2009 International GT Open season was the fourth season of the International GT Open. The season began on April 18 and ended on November 8, 2009. Joël Camathias and Marcel Fässler claimed both the Super GT title and the overall title, beating Autorlando Sport's Richard Lietz and Gianluca Roda in both standings. GTS champions were the Kessel Racing pairing of Michał Broniszewski and Philipp Peter.

== Drivers and teams ==
- All cars ran on Dunlop tyres.

Team	No.	Drivers	Class	Chassis	Engine	Rounds
(Italy) Racing Team Edil Cris	1	(Italy) Andrea Montermini	SGT	Ferrari F430 GT2	Ferrari 4.0L V8	1–2
(Italy) Racing Team Edil Cris	1	(Italy) Mattia Pavoni	SGT	Ferrari F430 GT2	Ferrari 4.0L V8	1–2
(Italy) Racing Team Edil Cris	6	(Italy) Alessandro Bonetti	SGT	Ferrari F430 GT2	Ferrari 4.0L V8	1–8
(Italy) Racing Team Edil Cris	6	(Italy) Raffaele Giammaria	SGT	Ferrari F430 GT2	Ferrari 4.0L V8	1–8
(Italy) Autorlando Sport	3	(Austria) Richard Lietz	SGT	Porsche 997 GT3-RSR	Porsche 4.0L Flat-6	1–8
(Italy) Autorlando Sport	3	(Italy) Gianluca Roda	SGT	Porsche 997 GT3-RSR	Porsche 4.0L Flat-6	1–8
(Italy) Autorlando Sport	4	(Portugal) Manuel Gião	SGT	Porsche 997 GT3-RSR	Porsche 4.0L Flat-6	1–8
(Italy) Autorlando Sport	4	(Portugal) Pedro Couceiro	SGT	Porsche 997 GT3-RSR	Porsche 4.0L Flat-6	1–8
(Switzerland) Trottet Racing	5	(Switzerland) Marcel Fässler	SGT	Ferrari F430 GTC	Ferrari 4.0L V8	1–6
(Switzerland) Trottet Racing	5	(Switzerland) Joël Camathias	SGT	Ferrari F430 GTC	Ferrari 4.0L V8	1–6
(Italy) Megadrive (Italy) Advanced Engineering	8	(Italy) Marco Cioci	SGT	Ferrari F430 GT2	Ferrari 4.0L V8	1–8
(Italy) Megadrive (Italy) Advanced Engineering	8	(Italy) Piergiuseppe Perazzini	SGT	Ferrari F430 GT2	Ferrari 4.0L V8	1–8
(Italy) Advanced Engineering	9	(United Kingdom) Peter Bamford	SGT	Ferrari F430 GT2	Ferrari 4.0L V8	1–8
(Italy) Advanced Engineering	9	(Republic of Ireland) Matt Griffin	SGT	Ferrari F430 GT2	Ferrari 4.0L V8	1–8
(Italy) Advanced Engineering	11	(Italy) Alessandro Garofano	SGT	Ferrari F430 GT2	Ferrari 4.0L V8	1–8
(Italy) Advanced Engineering	11	(Italy) Marco Mapelli	SGT	Ferrari F430 GT2	Ferrari 4.0L V8	1–2
(Italy) Advanced Engineering	11	(Portugal) Rui Águas	SGT	Ferrari F430 GT2	Ferrari 4.0L V8	1–4, 7–8
(Italy) Advanced Engineering	12	(Italy) Giacomo Ricci	SGT	Ferrari F430 GT2	Ferrari 4.0L V8	1–8
(Italy) Advanced Engineering	12	(Italy) Michele Rugolo	SGT	Ferrari F430 GT2	Ferrari 4.0L V8	1–8
(Italy) Advanced Engineering	65	(Italy) Carlo Romani	GTS	Maserati GranTurismo Coupé Cup	Maserati 4.7L V8	3–4
(Italy) Advanced Engineering	65	(Italy) Arturo Merzario	GTS	Maserati GranTurismo Coupé Cup	Maserati 4.7L V8	3–4
(Italy) Vittoria Competizioni	10	(Bulgaria) Plamen Kralev	SGT	Ferrari F430 GT2	Ferrari 4.0L V8	1–6
(Italy) Vittoria Competizioni	10	(Italy) Andrea Montermini	SGT	Ferrari F430 GT2	Ferrari 4.0L V8	3–4
(Italy) Vittoria Competizioni	10	(Italy) Ferdinando Monfardini	SGT	Ferrari F430 GT2	Ferrari 4.0L V8	7–8
(Italy) Vittoria Competizioni	10	(Italy) Marco Frezza	SGT	Ferrari F430 GT2	Ferrari 4.0L V8	7–8
(Italy) Vittoria Competizioni	67	(United States) John Horejsi	GTS	Ferrari F430 GT3	Ferrari 4.3L V8	1–8
(Spain) SunRed	14	(Spain) Víctor Fernández	SGT	SunRed SR21	Judd GV4 4.0L V10	1–6
(Spain) SunRed	14	(Spain) Lluis Llobet	SGT	SunRed SR21	Judd GV4 4.0L V10	1–6
(Spain) SunRed	15	(Spain) Óscar Fernández	SGT	SunRed SR21	Judd GV4 4.0L V10	1–6
(Spain) SunRed	15	(Italy) Matteo Cressoni	SGT	SunRed SR21	Judd GV4 4.0L V10	1–6
(France) IMSA Performance Matmut	16	(France) Raymond Narac	SGT	Porsche 997 GT3-RSR	Porsche 4.0L Flat-6	1–8
(France) IMSA Performance Matmut	16	(France) Patrick Pilet	SGT	Porsche 997 GT3-RSR	Porsche 4.0L Flat-6	1–8
(France) IMSA Performance Matmut	17	(France) Michel Lecourt	SGT	Porsche 997 GT3-RSR	Porsche 4.0L Flat-6	1–8
(France) IMSA Performance Matmut	17	(France) Richard Balandras	SGT	Porsche 997 GT3-RSR	Porsche 4.0L Flat-6	1–8
(France) IMSA Performance Matmut	18	(France) Jean-Philippe Belloc	SGT	Porsche 997 GT3-RSR	Porsche 4.0L Flat-6	1–8
(France) IMSA Performance Matmut	18	(France) Yannick David	SGT	Porsche 997 GT3-RSR	Porsche 4.0L Flat-6	1–8
(Italy) Easyrace	19	(Italy) Fabrizio del Monte	SGT	Ferrari F430 GT2	Ferrari 4.0L V8	1–2, 5–6
(Italy) Easyrace	19	(Switzerland) Steve Zacchia	SGT	Ferrari F430 GT2	Ferrari 4.0L V8	1–2, 5–6
(Portugal) António Nogueira	20	(Portugal) António Nogueira	SGT	Marcos LM600	Chevrolet 7.0L V8	3–4
(Italy) Scuderia 22	51	(Italy) Giacomo Piccini	GTS	Chevrolet Corvette Z06.R GT3	Chevrolet LS7 7.0L V8	7–8
(Italy) Scuderia 22	51	(Italy) Ferdinando Geri	GTS	Chevrolet Corvette Z06.R GT3	Chevrolet LS7 7.0L V8	7–8
(Spain) Escudería Roger Racing	52	(Spain) Miquel Julià	GTS	Ferrari F430 GT3	Ferrari 4.3L V8	1–4
(Spain) Escudería Roger Racing	52	(Portugal) Duarte Félix da Costa	GTS	Ferrari F430 GT3	Ferrari 4.3L V8	1–4
(Italy) FR Motorsport	55	(Italy) Riccardo Romagnoli	GTS	Dodge Viper Competition Coupe	Dodge 8.3L V10	1–2
(Italy) FR Motorsport	55	(Italy) Giuseppe de Pasquale	GTS	Dodge Viper Competition Coupe	Dodge 8.3L V10	1–2
(Italy) FR Motorsport	56	(Italy) Gabriele Sabatini	GTS	Dodge Viper Competition Coupe	Dodge 8.3L V10	1–2
(Italy) FR Motorsport	56	(Italy) Filippo Zadotti	GTS	Dodge Viper Competition Coupe	Dodge 8.3L V10	1–2
(Switzerland) Kessel Racing	57	(Italy) Lorenzo Bontempelli	GTS	Ferrari 430 Scuderia GT3	Ferrari 4.3L V8	1–6
(Switzerland) Kessel Racing	57	(Italy) Stefano Livio	GTS	Ferrari 430 Scuderia GT3	Ferrari 4.3L V8	1–6
(Switzerland) Kessel Racing	57	(Italy) Niki Cadei	GTS	Ferrari 430 Scuderia GT3	Ferrari 4.3L V8	7–8
(Switzerland) Kessel Racing	57	(Brazil) Paulo Bonifácio	GTS	Ferrari 430 Scuderia GT3	Ferrari 4.3L V8	7–8
(Switzerland) Kessel Racing	58	(Russia) Vadim Kuzminykh	GTS	Ferrari 430 Scuderia GT3	Ferrari 4.3L V8	1–8
(Switzerland) Kessel Racing	58	(United States) Stephen Earle	GTS	Ferrari 430 Scuderia GT3	Ferrari 4.3L V8	1–2, 5–6
(Switzerland) Kessel Racing	58	(Italy) Beniamino Caccia	GTS	Ferrari 430 Scuderia GT3	Ferrari 4.3L V8	3–4, 7–8
(Switzerland) Kessel Racing	59	(Austria) Philipp Peter	GTS	Ferrari 430 Scuderia GT3	Ferrari 4.3L V8	1–8
(Switzerland) Kessel Racing	59	(Poland) Michał Broniszewski	GTS	Ferrari 430 Scuderia GT3	Ferrari 4.3L V8	1–8
(Italy) Villois Racing	61	(Italy) Massimiliano Wiser	GTS	Aston Martin DBRS9	Aston Martin 6.0L V12	1–8
(Italy) Villois Racing	61	(Italy) Gabriele Lancieri	GTS	Aston Martin DBRS9	Aston Martin 6.0L V12	1–2, 5–8
(Italy) Villois Racing	61	(Italy) Luca Filippi	GTS	Aston Martin DBRS9	Aston Martin 6.0L V12	3–4
(Italy) Villois Racing	62	(Italy) Marco Petrini	GTS	Aston Martin DBRS9	Aston Martin 6.0L V12	1–8
(Italy) Villois Racing	62	(Spain) Lucas Guerrero	GTS	Aston Martin DBRS9	Aston Martin 6.0L V12	1–8
(United Kingdom) Chad Racing	64	(United Kingdom) Mike Cantillon	GTS	Ferrari F430 GT3	Ferrari 4.3L V8	3–8
(United Kingdom) Chad Racing	64	(United Kingdom) Jamie Constable	GTS	Ferrari F430 GT3	Ferrari 4.3L V8	3–8
(Portugal) Vodafone Racing	66	(Portugal) António Coimbra	GTS	Aston Martin DBRS9	Aston Martin 6.0L V12	3–4
(Portugal) Vodafone Racing	66	(Portugal) Luís Silva	GTS	Aston Martin DBRS9	Aston Martin 6.0L V12	3–4
(Italy) Aeffem	68	(Italy) Mario Ferraris	GTS	Ferrari F430 GT3	Ferrari 4.3L V8	1–2
(Italy) Aeffem	68	(Italy) Aldo Cerruti	GTS	Ferrari F430 GT3	Ferrari 4.3L V8	1–2
(France) J.C. Lagniez (France) Red Racing	69	(France) Jean-Claude Lagniez	GTS	Chevrolet Corvette Z06.R GT3	Chevrolet LS7 7.0L V8	3–6
(France) J.C. Lagniez (France) Red Racing	69	(Switzerland) Iradj Alexander	GTS	Chevrolet Corvette Z06.R GT3	Chevrolet LS7 7.0L V8	3–8
(France) J.C. Lagniez (France) Red Racing	69	(Spain) Miquel Julià	GTS	Chevrolet Corvette Z06.R GT3	Chevrolet LS7 7.0L V8	7–8

Icon	Class
SGT	Super GT Class
GTS	GTS Class

== Calendar ==
Round	Circuit	Date	Super GT winner	GTS winner
1	(Italy) Autodromo Enzo e Dino Ferrari, Imola	18 April	#12 Advanced Engineering	#59 Kessel Racing
1	(Italy) Autodromo Enzo e Dino Ferrari, Imola	18 April	(Italy) Michele Rugolo (Italy) Giacomo Ricci	(Poland) Michał Broniszewski (Austria) Philipp Peter
2	(Italy) Autodromo Enzo e Dino Ferrari, Imola	19 April	#5 Trottet Racing	#59 Kessel Racing
2	(Italy) Autodromo Enzo e Dino Ferrari, Imola	19 April	(Switzerland) Joël Camathias (Switzerland) Marcel Fässler	(Poland) Michał Broniszewski (Austria) Philipp Peter
3	(Portugal) Autódromo Internacional do Algarve, Portimão	16 May	#3 Autorlando Sport	#62 Villois Racing
3	(Portugal) Autódromo Internacional do Algarve, Portimão	16 May	(Italy) Gianluca Roda (Austria) Richard Lietz	(Italy) Marco Petrini (Spain) Lucas Guerrero
4	(Portugal) Autódromo Internacional do Algarve, Portimão	17 May	#5 Trottet Racing	#59 Kessel Racing
4	(Portugal) Autódromo Internacional do Algarve, Portimão	17 May	(Switzerland) Marcel Fässler (Switzerland) Joël Camathias	(Poland) Michał Broniszewski (Austria) Philipp Peter
5	(Belgium) Circuit de Spa-Francorchamps, Spa	27 June	#16 IMSA Performance Matmut	#59 Kessel Racing
5	(Belgium) Circuit de Spa-Francorchamps, Spa	27 June	(France) Raymond Narac (France) Patrick Pilet	(Poland) Michał Broniszewski (Austria) Philipp Peter
6	(Belgium) Circuit de Spa-Francorchamps, Spa	28 June	#3 Autorlando Sport	#61 Villois Racing
6	(Belgium) Circuit de Spa-Francorchamps, Spa	28 June	(Italy) Gianluca Roda (Austria) Richard Lietz	(Italy) Massimiliano Wiser (Italy) Gabriele Lancieri
7	(United Kingdom) Donington Park, Castle Donington	4 July	#16 IMSA Performance Matmut	#59 Kessel Racing
7	(United Kingdom) Donington Park, Castle Donington	4 July	(France) Raymond Narac (France) Patrick Pilet	(Poland) Michał Broniszewski (Austria) Philipp Peter
8	(United Kingdom) Donington Park, Castle Donington	5 July	#16 IMSA Performance Matmut	#59 Kessel Racing
8	(United Kingdom) Donington Park, Castle Donington	5 July	(France) Raymond Narac (France) Patrick Pilet	(Poland) Michał Broniszewski (Austria) Philipp Peter
9	(France) Circuit de Nevers Magny-Cours, Magny-Cours	19 September	#5 Trottet Racing	#62 Villois Racing
9	(France) Circuit de Nevers Magny-Cours, Magny-Cours	19 September	(Switzerland) Marcel Fässler (Switzerland) Joël Camathias	(Italy) Marco Petrini (Spain) Lucas Guerrero
10	(France) Circuit de Nevers Magny-Cours, Magny-Cours	20 September	#4 Autorlando Sport	#78 JMB Racing
10	(France) Circuit de Nevers Magny-Cours, Magny-Cours	20 September	(Portugal) Pedro Couceiro (Portugal) Manuel Gião	(France) Jean Bachelier (France) Yannick Mallegol
11	(Italy) Autodromo Nazionale di Monza, Monza	3 October	#5 Trottet Racing	#62 Villois Racing
11	(Italy) Autodromo Nazionale di Monza, Monza	3 October	(Switzerland) Marcel Fässler (Switzerland) Joël Camathias	(Italy) Marco Petrini (Spain) Lucas Guerrero
12	(Italy) Autodromo Nazionale di Monza, Monza	4 October	#5 Trottet Racing	#61 Villois Racing
12	(Italy) Autodromo Nazionale di Monza, Monza	4 October	(Switzerland) Marcel Fässler (Switzerland) Joël Camathias	(Italy) Massimiliano Wiser (Italy) Gabriele Lancieri
13	(Spain) Circuit de Catalunya, Montmeló	31 October	#16 IMSA Performance Matmut	#72 Mtech Racing
13	(Spain) Circuit de Catalunya, Montmeló	31 October	(France) Raymond Narac (France) Patrick Pilet	(United Kingdom) Duncan Cameron (Republic of Ireland) Matt Griffin
14	(Spain) Circuit de Catalunya, Montmeló	1 November	#16 IMSA Performance Matmut	#85 Phoenix Racing
14	(Spain) Circuit de Catalunya, Montmeló	1 November	(France) Raymond Narac (France) Patrick Pilet	(Italy) Andrea Piccini (Switzerland) Jean-Denis Délétraz
15	(Portugal) Autódromo Internacional do Algarve, Portimão^{A}	7 November	#5 Trottet Racing	#61 Villois Racing
15	(Portugal) Autódromo Internacional do Algarve, Portimão^{A}	7 November	(Switzerland) Marcel Fässler (Switzerland) Joël Camathias	(Italy) Massimiliano Wiser (Spain) Lucas Guerrero
16	(Portugal) Autódromo Internacional do Algarve, Portimão^{A}	8 November	#16 IMSA Performance Matmut	#61 Villois Racing
16	(Portugal) Autódromo Internacional do Algarve, Portimão^{A}	8 November	(France) Raymond Narac (France) Patrick Pilet	(Italy) Massimiliano Wiser (Spain) Lucas Guerrero

^A Replaces the round originally meant to be held at Valencia Street Circuit. Held simultaneously with the Spanish GT Championship races.

== Championships ==
Points are awarded to the top five finishers in the order 10-8-6-4-3.

=== Drivers Championship ===
==== Super GT Standings ====
Pos	Driver	Team	IMO (Italy)		ALG (Portugal)		SPA (Belgium)		DON (United Kingdom)		MAG (France)		MNZ (Italy)		CAT (Spain)		ALG (Portugal)		Total
1	(Switzerland) Joël Camathias (Switzerland) Marcel Fässler	(Switzerland) Trottet Racing		10	6	10	3	8	3	8	10	3	10	10	8		10		99
2	(Austria) Richard Lietz (Italy) Gianluca Roda	(Italy) Autorlando Sport	6	6	10	4	8	10	4	6	8		8		4	6	8	6	94
3	(France) Raymond Narac (France) Patrick Pilet	(France) IMSA Performance Matmut	8				10	3	10	10	6	8			10	10	6	10	91
4	(Portugal) Pedro Couceiro (Portugal) Manuel Gião	(Italy) Autorlando Sport	4		4	8	4	6	8	4	3	10	4						55
5	(Italy) Giacomo Ricci (Italy) Michele Rugolo	(Italy) Advanced Engineering	10	4	8		6		6		4		6	6					50
6	(Italy) Marco Cioci (Italy) Piergiuseppe Perazzini	(Italy) Megadrive		8		6		4		3		6	3	4	3	4		4	45
7	(Italy) Alessandro Bonetti (Italy) Raffaele Giammaria	(Italy) Racing Team Edil Cris	3	3		3								8					17
8	(Italy) Marco Frezza (Italy) Ferdinando Monfardini	(Italy) Vittoria Competizioni													6	8			14
9	(France) Jean-Philippe Belloc	(France) IMSA Performance Matmut										4						8	12
10	(Portugal) Rui Águas (Italy) Alessandro Garofano	(Italy) Advanced Engineering														3	4	3	10
11	(France) Richard Balandras	(France) IMSA Performance Matmut																8	8
12	(France) Yannick David	(France) IMSA Performance Matmut										4							4
13=	(Italy) Matteo Cressoni (Spain) Óscar Fernández	(Spain) SunRed			3														3
13=	(United Kingdom) Peter Bamford (United Kingdom) Matt Griffin	(Italy) Advanced Engineering												3					3
Pos	Driver	Team	IMO (Italy)		ALG (Portugal)		SPA (Belgium)		DON (United Kingdom)		MAG (France)		MNZ (Italy)		CAT (Spain)		ALG (Portugal)		Total

==== GTS Standings ====
Pos	Driver	Team	IMO (Italy)		ALG (Portugal)		SPA (Belgium)		DON (United Kingdom)		MAG (France)		MNZ (Italy)		CAT (Spain)		ALG (Portugal)		Total
1	(Poland) Michał Broniszewski (Austria) Philipp Peter	(Switzerland) Kessel Racing	10	10		10	10	6	10	10	6	6	8	4	6	8	3		107
2	(Italy) Massimiliano Wiser	(Italy) Villois Racing	8	8		8	8	10	8	6				10	4		10	10	90
3	(Spain) Lucas Guerrero	(Italy) Villois Racing	6		10				6	8	10	3	10	8	4		10	10	85
4	(Italy) Marco Petrini	(Italy) Villois Racing	6		10			8	6	8	10	3	10	8					69
5	(Italy) Gabriele Lancieri	(Italy) Villois Racing	8	8			8	10	8	6				10				8	66
6	(Russia) Vadim Kuzminykh	(Switzerland) Kessel Racing		6					4		8	8		6			8	6	66
7	(Italy) Lorenzo Bontempelli	(Switzerland) Kessel Racing			4						8	8		6					26
8	(Spain) Miquel Julià	(Spain) Escudería Roger Racing (France) J.C. Lagniez	3	4	3					4	3		6						23
9	(France) Jean-Claude Lagniez	(France) J.C. Lagniez			6	6					3		6						21
10	(United Kingdom) Duncan Cameron	(United Kingdom) Mtech Racing					4								10	6			20
11	(Republic of Ireland) Matt Griffin	(United Kingdom) Mtech Racing													10	6			16
11	(Switzerland) Iradj Alexander	(France) J.C. Lagniez			6	6				4									16
12=	(France) Jean Bachelier (France) Yannick Mallegol	(Monaco) JMB Racing									4	10							14
12=	(Italy) Stefano Gattuso	(Switzerland) Kessel Racing															8	6	14
13	(Switzerland) Jean-Denis Délétraz (Italy) Andrea Piccini	(Germany) Phoenix													3	10			13
14=	(United States) John Horejsi	(Italy) Vittoria Competizioni			8	4													12
14=	(Portugal) António Coimbra (Portugal) Luís Silva	(Portugal) Vodafone Racing				3											6	3	12
15	(France) Frederic Makowiecki (France) Jean-Philippe Dayraut	(France) Team As Events													8	3			11
16=	(Italy) Ferdinando Geri (Italy) Giacomo Piccini	(Italy) Scuderia 22				6	4												10
16=	(Portugal) Duarte Félix da Costa	(Spain) Escudería Roger Racing	3	4	3														10
17=	(Italy) Luca Filippi	(Italy) Villois Racing				8													8
17=	(Italy) Paolo Necchi	(Italy) Villois Racing						8											8
17=	(Italy) Massimiliano Busnelli	(Italy) Villois Racing																8	8
17=	(Italy) Filippo Zadotti (Italy) Gabriele Sabatini	(Italy) FR Motorsport	4										4						4
18=	(United States) Stephen Earle	(Switzerland) Kessel Racing		6															6
18=	(Italy) Stefano Borghi (Italy) Gianluca de Lorenzi	(Italy) GDL Racing					3	3											6
19=	(Italy) Stefano Livio	(Switzerland) Kessel Racing			4														4
19=	(United Kingdom) Mike Edmonds	(United Kingdom) Mtech Racing					4												4
19=	(Italy) Beniamino Caccia	(Switzerland) Kessel Racing								4									4
19=	(France) Christian Lepreux (France) Jacques Médard	(France) Ruffier Racing										4							4
19=	(Italy) Maurice Ricci (France) Mike Savary	(Italy) Maurice Ricci														4			4
19=	(France) Gabriele Balthazard (France) Jérôme Policand	(France) Gabriele Balthazard																4	4
20=	(Italy) Giuseppe de Pasquale (Italy) Riccardo Romagnoli	(Italy) FR Motorsport		3															3
20=	(United Kingdom) Leyton Clarke (United Kingdom) Adam Jones	(United Kingdom) Mtech Racing							3										3
20=	(Italy) Maurizio Ardigo	(Italy) Maurizio Ardigo											3						3
20=	(Canada) Jean-Francois Dumoulin (United States) Hynn Lee	(Italy) Vittoria Competizioni												3					3
Pos	Driver	Team	IMO (Italy)		ALG (Portugal)		SPA (Belgium)		DON (United Kingdom)		MAG (France)		MNZ (Italy)		CAT (Spain)		ALG (Portugal)		Total

=== Teams Championship ===
==== Super GT Standings ====
Pos	Team	IMO (Italy)		ALG (Portugal)		SPA (Belgium)		DON (United Kingdom)		MAG (France)		MNZ (Italy)		CAT (Spain)		ALG (Portugal)		Total
1	(Italy) Autorlando Sport	10	6	14	12	12	16	12	10	11	10	12		4	6	8	6	149
2	(France) IMSA Performance Matmut	8				10	3	10	10	6	12			10	10	6	18	103
3	(Switzerland) Trottet Racing		10	6	10	3	8	3	8	10	3	10	10	8		10		99
4	(Italy) Advanced Engineering	10	4	8		6		6		4		6	9		3	4	3	63
5	(Italy) Megadrive		8		6		4		3		6	3	4	3	4		4	45
6	(Italy) Racing Team Edil Cris	3	3		3								8					17
7	(Italy) Vittoria Competizioni													6	8			14
8	(Spain) SunRed			3														3
Pos	Team	IMO (Italy)		ALG (Portugal)		SPA (Belgium)		DON (United Kingdom)		MAG (France)		MNZ (Italy)		CAT (Spain)		ALG (Portugal)		Total

==== GTS Standings ====
Pos	Team	IMO (Italy)		ALG (Portugal)		SPA (Belgium)		DON (United Kingdom)		MAG (France)		MNZ (Italy)		CAT (Spain)		ALG (Portugal)		Total
1	(Italy) Villois Racing	14	8	10	8	8	18	14	14	10	3	10	18	4		10	18	167
2	(Switzerland) Kessel Racing	10	16	4	10	10	6	14	10	14	14	8	10	6	8	8	6	154
3	(United Kingdom) Mtech Racing					4								10	6			20
4	(France) J.C. Lagniez				6				4			6						16
5	(Italy) Vittoria Competizioni			8	4								3					15
6	(Germany) Phoenix Racing													3	10			13
7	(Italy) Scuderia 22					6	4			3								13
8	(Portugal) Vodafone Racing				3											6	3	12
9	(France) Team AS Events													8	3			11
10	(Italy) FR Motorsport	4	3									4						11
11	(Monaco) JMB Racing										10							10
12	(Spain) Escudería Roger Racing	3	4	3														10
13	(United Kingdom) Apex Racing								3		4							7
14	(Italy) GDL Racing					3	3											6
15=	(France) Ruffier Racing										4							4
15=	(France) Maurice Ricci														4			4
15=	(France) Gabriele Balthazard																4	4
18	(Italy) Maurizio Ardigo											3						3
Pos	Team	IMO (Italy)		ALG (Portugal)		SPA (Belgium)		DON (United Kingdom)		MAG (France)		MNZ (Italy)		CAT (Spain)		ALG (Portugal)		Total
