= 2016 Gulf 12 Hours =

6th Gulf 12 Hours endurance race

The layout of Yas Marina Circuit, where the race was held

The 2016 Gulf 12 Hours was the sixth edition of the Gulf 12 Hours. The race was held at Yas Marina Circuit on 17 December 2016. It was contested with GT3-spec, GT4-spec, Lamborghini Super Trofeo and LMP3 cars.

The race was won for a second consecutive year by Michał Broniszewski, Davide Rigon and Andrea Piccini in the #11 Kessel Racing Ferrari 488 GT3.

== Race Results ==
=== Part 1 ===
Class winners denoted in bold.

Pos.	Class	No.	Team	Drivers	Car	Laps	Time/Gap
1	**Pro**	**11**	**(Switzerland) Kessel Racing**	**(Poland) Michał Broniszewski** **(Italy) Davide Rigon** **(Italy) Andrea Piccini**	**Ferrari 488 GT3**	**143**	**6:01:52.426**
2	Pro	88	(United Arab Emirates) Dragon Racing	(France) Nicolas Minassian (Republic of Ireland) Matt Griffin (United Kingdom) Rob Barff	Ferrari 488 GT3	143	+37.162
3	Pro	16	(United Arab Emirates) GP Extreme	(South Africa) Jordan Grogor (Netherlands) Nicky Pastorelli (United Kingdom) Stuart Hall	Renault R.S. 01	143	+2:03.885
4	**Pro-Am**	**51**	**(Italy) AF Corse**	**(Switzerland) Thomas Flohr** **(Italy) Francesco Castellacci** **(Italy) Andrea Rizzoli**	**Ferrari 488 GT3**	**142**	**+1 Lap**
5	**Gent**	**99**	**(Germany) Herbeth Motorsport**	**(Switzerland) Daniel Allemann** **(Germany) Ralf Bohn** **(Germany) Robert Renauer**	**Porsche 911 GT3 R**	**142**	**+1 Lap**
6	Pro-Am	75	(United Kingdom) Optimum Motorsport	(United Kingdom) Flick Haigh (United Kingdom) Joe Osborne (United Kingdom) Ryan Ratcliffe	Audi R8 LMS	142	+1 Lap
7	Gent	77	(Switzerland) Kessel Racing	(Belgium) Jacques Duyver (Italy) Marco Zanuttini (South Africa) David Perel	Ferrari 458 Italia GT3	141	+2 Laps
8	**Proto**	**24**	**(France) Graff**	**(France) Eric Trouillet** **(France) Adrien Chila** **(France) Fabrice Rossello** **(France) Alexandre Cougnaud**	**Ligier JS P3**	**141**	**+2 Laps**
9	Proto	5	(France) Graff	(United Kingdom) James Winslow (New Zealand) Gregory Taylor (Australia) Neale Muston	Ligier JS P3	141	+2 Laps
10	Pro-Am	58	(Switzerland) Sportec Motorsport	(Switzerland) Christoph Lenz (Italy) Roberto Pampanini (Switzerland) Mauro Calamia	Lamborghini Huracán GT3	140	+3 Laps
11	Gent	71	(San Marino) GDL Racing Middle East	(Italy) Mario Cordoni (Italy) Roberto Silva (United Kingdom) Steven Liquorish	Lamborghini Huracán LP620-2 Super Trofeo	140	+3 Laps
12	Proto	23	(United Kingdom) United Autosports	(United Kingdom) Richard Meins (United Kingdom) Shaun Lynn (United Kingdom) Alex Lynn	Ligier JS P3	139	+4 Laps
13	Gent	80	(Switzerland) Kessel Racing	(France) Deborah Mayer (Italy) Claudio Schiavoni (Italy) Sergio Pianezzola	Ferrari 458 Italia GT3	138	+5 Laps
14	Pro-Am	15	(United Arab Emirates) GP Extreme	(France) Frederic Fatien (Switzerland) Tiziano Carugati (United Kingdom) Josh Webster	Renault R.S. 01	137	+6 Laps
15	Gent	33	(Germany) Car Collection Motorsport	(Germany) Oliver Bender (Germany) Dirk Parhofer (Germany) Dimitri Parhofer (Germany) Peter Schmidt	Audi R8 LMS	136	+7 Laps
16	Proto	22	(United Kingdom) United Autosports	(United States) Jim McGuire (United States) Matt Keegan (France) Nico Rondet (Sweden) Stefan Johansson	Ligier JS P3	133	+10 Laps
17	**GTX**	**50**	**(Italy) Scuderia Villorba Corse**	**(Italy) Patrick Zamparini** **(Poland) Piotr Chodzen** **(Poland) Antoni Chodzen**	**Maserati GranTurismo MC GT4**	**132**	**+11 Laps**
18	GTX	8	(United Arab Emirates) Dragon Racing	(United States) Bill Martin (France) Sylvain Michel (India) Zaamin Jaffer	Porsche Cayman GT4 Clubsport	131	+12 Laps
19	GTX	9	(United Kingdom) Slidesport Motorsport	(United Kingdom) Wayne Marrs (United Kingdom) Ross Wylie (United Kingdom) David Fairbrother	Porsche Cayman GT4 Clubsport	129	+14 Laps
20	GTX	44	(United Kingdom) Generation AMR	(United Kingdom) James Holder (United Kingdom) Matt George (Republic of Ireland) Christopher Murphy	Aston Martin V8 Vantage GT4	128	+15 Laps
21	GTX	40	(United Kingdom) Brookspeed	(United Kingdom) Graeme Mundy (United Kingdom) Aaron Mason (United Kingdom) Colin Paton	Porsche Cayman GT4 Clubsport	127	+16 Laps
22	GTX	90	(Italy) Scuderia Villorba Corse	(Italy) Giuseppe Fascicolo (Hungary) Csaba Mor (Germany) Thomas Herpell	Maserati GranTurismo MC GT4	115	+28 Laps
23 DNF	Gent	61	(San Marino) GDL Racing Middle East	(United States) Jim Michaelian (Italy) Roberto Rayneri (Russia) Mickail Spiridonov	Lamborghini Huracán LP620-2 Super Trofeo	33	+110 Laps
24 DNF	Gent	78	(United Kingdom) Barwell Motorsport	(Portugal) Miguel Ramos (Portugal) Filipe Barreiros (Portugal) Francisco Guedes (Denmark) Mads Rasmussen	Lamborghini Huracán GT3	31	+112 Laps

=== Part 2 ===
Class winners denoted in bold.

Pos.	Class	No.	Team	Drivers	Car	Laps	Time/Gap
1	**Pro**	**11**	**(Switzerland) Kessel Racing**	**(Poland) Michał Broniszewski** **(Italy) Davide Rigon** **(Italy) Andrea Piccini**	**Ferrari 488 GT3**	**303**	**6:00:57.811**
2	Pro	88	(United Arab Emirates) Dragon Racing	(France) Nicolas Minassian (Republic of Ireland) Matt Griffin (United Kingdom) Rob Barff	Ferrari 488 GT3	303	+1:19.570
3	Pro	16	(United Arab Emirates) GP Extreme	(South Africa) Jordan Grogor (Netherlands) Nicky Pastorelli (United Kingdom) Stuart Hall	Renault R.S. 01	301	+2 Laps
4	**Pro-Am**	**51**	**(Italy) AF Corse**	**(Switzerland) Thomas Flohr** **(Italy) Francesco Castellacci** **(Italy) Andrea Rizzoli**	**Ferrari 488 GT3**	**300**	**+3 Laps**
5	**Gent**	**77**	**(Switzerland) Kessel Racing**	**(Belgium) Jacques Duyver** **(Italy) Marco Zanuttini** **(South Africa) David Perel**	**Ferrari 458 Italia GT3**	**297**	**+6 Laps**
6	Pro-Am	75	(United Kingdom) Optimum Motorsport	(United Kingdom) Flick Haigh (United Kingdom) Joe Osborne (United Kingdom) Ryan Ratcliffe	Audi R8 LMS	296	+7 Laps
7	**Proto**	**5**	**(France) Graff**	**(United Kingdom) James Winslow** **(New Zealand) Gregory Taylor** **(Australia) Neale Muston**	**Ligier JS P3**	**295**	**+8 Laps**
8	Gent	71	(San Marino) GDL Racing Middle East	(Italy) Mario Cordoni (Italy) Roberto Silva (United Kingdom) Steven Liquorish	Lamborghini Huracán LP620-2 Super Trofeo	294	+9 Laps
9	Pro-Am	58	(Switzerland) Sportec Motorsport	(Switzerland) Christoph Lenz (Italy) Roberto Pampanini (Switzerland) Mauro Calamia	Lamborghini Huracán GT3	294	+9 Laps
10	Proto	23	(United Kingdom) United Autosports	(United Kingdom) Richard Meins (United Kingdom) Shaun Lynn (United Kingdom) Alex Lynn	Ligier JS P3	291	+12 Laps
11	Pro-Am	15	(United Arab Emirates) GP Extreme	(France) Frederic Fatien (Switzerland) Tiziano Carugati (United Kingdom) Josh Webster	Renault R.S. 01	291	+12 Laps
12	Gent	80	(Switzerland) Kessel Racing	(France) Deborah Mayer (Italy) Claudio Schiavoni (Italy) Sergio Pianezzola	Ferrari 458 Italia GT3	290	+13 Laps
13	Gent	33	(Germany) Car Collection Motorsport	(Germany) Oliver Bender (Germany) Dirk Parhofer (Germany) Dimitri Parhofer (Germany) Peter Schmidt	Audi R8 LMS	287	+15 Laps
14	Proto	22	(United Kingdom) United Autosports	(United States) Jim McGuire (United States) Matt Keegan (France) Nico Rondet (Sweden) Stefan Johansson	Ligier JS P3	275	+28 Laps
15	**GTX**	**50**	**(Italy) Scuderia Villorba Corse**	**(Italy) Patrick Zamparini** **(Poland) Piotr Chodzen** **(Poland) Antoni Chodzen**	**Maserati GranTurismo MC GT4**	**274**	**+29 Laps**
16 DNF	Gent	99	(Germany) Herbeth Motorsport	(Switzerland) Daniel Allemann (Germany) Ralf Bohn (Germany) Robert Renauer	Porsche 911 GT3 R	272	+32 Laps
17	GTX	8	(United Arab Emirates) Dragon Racing	(United States) Bill Martin (France) Sylvain Michel (India) Zaamin Jaffer	Porsche Cayman GT4 Clubsport	272	+32 Laps
18	GTX	40	(United Kingdom) Brookspeed	(United Kingdom) Graeme Mundy (United Kingdom) Aaron Mason (United Kingdom) Colin Paton	Porsche Cayman GT4 Clubsport	270	+35 Laps
19	GTX	44	(United Kingdom) Generation AMR	(United Kingdom) James Holder (United Kingdom) Matt George (Republic of Ireland) Christopher Murphy	Aston Martin V8 Vantage GT4	269	+36 Laps
20	GTX	9	(United Kingdom) Slidesport Motorsport	(United Kingdom) Wayne Marrs (United Kingdom) Ross Wylie (United Kingdom) David Fairbrother	Porsche Cayman GT4 Clubsport	254	+49 Laps
21	GTX	90	(Italy) Scuderia Villorba Corse	(Italy) Giuseppe Fascicolo (Hungary) Csaba Mor (Germany) Thomas Herpell	Maserati GranTurismo MC GT4	222	+81 Laps
22 DNF	Proto	24	(France) Graff	(France) Eric Trouillet (France) Adrien Chila (France) Fabrice Rossello (France) Alexandre Cougnaud	Ligier JS P3	206	+97 Laps
23	Gent	78	(United Kingdom) Barwell Motorsport	(Portugal) Miguel Ramos (Portugal) Filipe Barreiros (Portugal) Francisco Guedes (Denmark) Mads Rasmussen	Lamborghini Huracán GT3	187	+116 Laps
24 DNS	Gent	61	(San Marino) GDL Racing Middle East	(United States) Jim Michaelian (Italy) Roberto Rayneri (Russia) Mickail Spiridonov	Lamborghini Huracán LP620-2 Super Trofeo	0	—
