= 2013 Gulf 12 Hours =

3rd Gulf 12 Hours endurance race

The layout of Yas Marina Circuit

The 2013 Gulf 12 Hours was the 3rd edition of the Gulf 12 Hours. The race was held at Yas Marina Circuit on 13 December 2013. It was contested with GT3-spec, GT4-spec, and Group CN cars.

The race was won by Khaled Al Qubaisi, Jeroen Bleekemolen and Bernd Schneider in the #3 Team Abu Dhabi by Black Falcon Mercedes-Benz SLS AMG GT3.

== Race results ==
=== Part 1 ===
Class winners denoted in bold.

Pos.	Class	#	Team	Drivers	Car	Laps
1	**GT3**	**1**	**(Italy) AF Corse**	**(Italy) Marco Cioci** **(Australia) Steve Wyatt** **(Italy) Michele Rugolo**	**Ferrari 458 Italia GT3**	**152**
2	GT3	3	(United Arab Emirates) Team Abu Dhabi by Black Falcon	(United Arab Emirates) Khaled Al Qubaisi (Netherlands) Jeroen Bleekemolen (Germany) Bernd Schneider	Mercedes-Benz SLS AMG GT3	152
3	GT3	7	(United Kingdom) M-Sport Bentley	(United Kingdom) Steven Kane (United Kingdom) Guy Smith (United Kingdom) Andy Meyrick	Bentley Continental GT3	151
4	GT3	11	(Switzerland) Kessel Racing	(Brazil) César Ramos (Poland) Michał Broniszewski (Italy) Daniel Zampieri	Ferrari 458 Italia GT3	151
5	GT3	9	(United Kingdom) Gulf Racing	(United Kingdom) Michael Wainwright (United Kingdom) Adam Carroll (United Kingdom) Rob Bell	McLaren MP4-12C GT3	150
6	GT3	34	(France) Pro GT by Alméras	(France) Grégory Guilvert (France) Eric Dermont (France) Franck Perera	Porsche 997 GT3-R	148
7	GT3	69	(United Kingdom) Gulf Racing	(France) Frederic Fatien (Germany) Roald Goethe (United Kingdom) Stuart Hall	Lamborghini Gallardo LP600+ GT	145
8	GT3	44	(Germany) MRS GT-Racing	(Germany) Ralf Bohn (Russia) Ilya Melnikov (Switzerland) Daniel Allemann	Porsche 911 GT3 Cup	145
9	GT3	15	(Russia) Slamstop Motorsport	(Italy) Matteo Bobbi (Russia) Alexander Skryabin (Italy) Alessandro Pier Guidi	Ferrari 458 Italia GT3	144
10	**GTX**	**91**	**(Italy) Nova Race**	**(Italy) Gian Piero Cristoni** **(Sweden) Tommy Lindroth** **(Italy) Tiziano Cappelletti** **(Italy) Matteo Cressoni**	**Ginetta G50 GT4**	**136**
11	GTX	93	(United Arab Emirates) Yas Marina Circuit	(United Arab Emirates) Abbas Al Alawi (United Arab Emirates) Saeed Bintowq (United Arab Emirates) Haytham Sultan	Aston Martin V8 Vantage	134
12	GTX	92	(United Kingdom) Optimum Motorsport	(United Kingdom) Lee Mowle (United Kingdom) Ryan Ratcliffe (United Kingdom) Joe Osborne	Ginetta G50 GT4	132
13	GTX	90	(Italy) Nova Race	(Italy) Luca Magnoni (Italy) Luis Scarpaccio (Belgium) Pierre Piron	Ginetta G50 GT4	128
14	GT3	88	(United Arab Emirates) Dragon Racing	(Belgium) Jacques Duyver (United Kingdom) Gary Eastwood (United Kingdom) Rob Barff	Ferrari 458 Italia GT3	127
15	**CN**	**95**	**(Italy) Avelon Formula**	**(Italy) Stefano De Val** **(Italy) Maurizio Pitorri** **(Spain) Jesùs Fuster**	**Wolf GB08**	**117**
16	CN	96	(Italy) Avelon Formula	(Italy) Nicola De Val (Italy) Alessandro Tonoli (Italy) Gianluca Pizzuti	Wolf GB08	115
17	GT3	14	(Switzerland) Kessel Racing	(Switzerland) Thomas Flohr (Czech Republic) Filip Salaquarda (Italy) Francesco Castellacci	Ferrari 458 Italia GT3	97
18	GT3	5	(Germany) MRS GT-Racing	(Puerto Rico) Felix Serrallés (Germany) Siegfried Venema (United Kingdom) Oliver Webb	McLaren MP4-12C GT3	90
19	GT3	4	(United Arab Emirates) Team Abu Dhabi by Black Falcon	(Netherlands) Klaas Hummel (Sweden) Andreas Simonsen (United Kingdom) Adam Christodolou	Mercedes-Benz SLS AMG GT3	62
20	GT3	8	(United Arab Emirates) Dragon Racing	(Kuwait) Khaled Al Mudhaf (Saudi Arabia) Mohammed Jawa (South Africa) Jordan Grogor	McLaren MP4-12C GT3	56
21	CN	97	(Italy) BF Motorsport	(Italy) Filippo Caliceti (Italy) Simone Borelli (Italy) Gianmarco Gamberini	Wolf GB08	46

=== Part 2 ===
Class winners denoted in bold.

Pos.	Class	#	Team	Drivers	Car	Laps
1	**GT3**	**3**	**(United Arab Emirates) Team Abu Dhabi by Black Falcon**	**(United Arab Emirates) Khaled Al Qubaisi** **(Netherlands) Jeroen Bleekemolen** **(Germany) Bernd Schneider**	**Mercedes-Benz SLS AMG GT3**	**308**
2	GT3	1	(Italy) AF Corse	(Italy) Marco Cioci (Australia) Steve Wyatt (Italy) Michele Rugolo	Ferrari 458 Italia GT3	308
3	GT3	11	(Switzerland) Kessel Racing	(Brazil) César Ramos (Poland) Michał Broniszewski (Italy) Daniel Zampieri	Ferrari 458 Italia GT3	307
4	GT3	7	(United Kingdom) M-Sport Bentley	(United Kingdom) Steven Kane (United Kingdom) Guy Smith (United Kingdom) Andy Meyrick	Bentley Continental GT3	306
5	GT3	9	(United Kingdom) Gulf Racing	(United Kingdom) Michael Wainwright (United Kingdom) Adam Carroll (United Kingdom) Rob Bell	McLaren MP4-12C GT3	305
6	GT3	34	(France) Pro GT by Alméras	(France) Grégory Guilvert (France) Eric Dermont (France) Franck Perera	Porsche 997 GT3-R	301
7	GT3	69	(United Kingdom) Gulf Racing	(France) Frederic Fatien (Germany) Roald Goethe (United Kingdom) Stuart Hall	Lamborghini Gallardo LP600+ GT	295
8	GT3	44	(Germany) MRS GT-Racing	(Germany) Ralf Bohn (Russia) Ilya Melnikov (Switzerland) Daniel Allemann	Porsche 911 GT3 Cup	293
9	GT3	15	(Russia) Slamstop Motorsport	(Italy) Matteo Bobbi (Russia) Alexander Skryabin (Italy) Alessandro Pier Guidi	Ferrari 458 Italia GT3	277
10	**GTX**	**91**	**(Italy) Nova Race**	**(Italy) Gian Piero Cristoni** **(Sweden) Tommy Lindroth** **(Italy) Tiziano Cappelletti** **(Italy) Matteo Cressoni**	**Ginetta G50 GT4**	**277**
11	GT3	88	(United Arab Emirates) Dragon Racing	(Belgium) Jacques Duyver (United Kingdom) Gary Eastwood (United Kingdom) Rob Barff	Ferrari 458 Italia GT3	276
12	GTX	92	(United Kingdom) Optimum Motorsport	(United Kingdom) Lee Mowle (United Kingdom) Ryan Ratcliffe (United Kingdom) Joe Osborne	Ginetta G50 GT4	273
13	GTX	90	(Italy) Nova Race	(Italy) Luca Magnoni (Italy) Luis Scarpaccio (Belgium) Pierre Piron	Ginetta G50 GT4	270
14	GTX	93	(United Arab Emirates) Yas Marina Circuit	(United Arab Emirates) Abbas Al Alawi (United Arab Emirates) Saeed Bintowq (United Arab Emirates) Haytham Sultan	Aston Martin V8 Vantage	269
15	**CN**	**95**	**(Italy) Avelon Formula**	**(Italy) Stefano De Val** **(Italy) Maurizio Pitorri** **(Spain) Jesùs Fuster**	**Wolf GB08**	**240**
16	CN	96	(Italy) Avelon Formula	(Italy) Nicola De Val (Italy) Alessandro Tonoli (Italy) Gianluca Pizzuti	Wolf GB08	239
17	GT3	4	(United Arab Emirates) Team Abu Dhabi by Black Falcon	(Netherlands) Klaas Hummel (Sweden) Andreas Simonsen (United Kingdom) Adam Christodolou	Mercedes-Benz SLS AMG GT3	217
18	GT3	14	(Switzerland) Kessel Racing	(Switzerland) Thomas Flohr (Czech Republic) Filip Salaquarda (Italy) Francesco Castellacci	Ferrari 458 Italia GT3	159
19	GT3	5	(Germany) MRS GT-Racing	(Puerto Rico) Felix Serrallés (Germany) Siegfried Venema (United Kingdom) Oliver Webb	McLaren MP4-12C GT3	113
20 DNF	GT3	8	(United Arab Emirates) Dragon Racing	(Kuwait) Khaled Al Mudhaf (Saudi Arabia) Mohammed Jawa (South Africa) Jordan Grogor	McLaren MP4-12C GT3	—
21 DNF	CN	97	(Italy) BF Motorsport	(Italy) Filippo Caliceti (Italy) Simone Borelli (Italy) Gianmarco Gamberini	Wolf GB08	—
