= 2015 Gulf 12 Hours =

5th Gulf 12 Hours endurance race

The layout of Yas Marina Circuit

The 2015 Gulf 12 Hours was the 5th edition of the Gulf 12 Hours. The race was held at Yas Marina Circuit on 11 December 2015. It was contested with GT3-spec, Porsche Cup cars, and Group CN cars.

The race was won by Michał Broniszewski, Davide Rigon and Andrea Piccini in the #11 Kessel Racing Ferrari 458 Italia GT3.

== Race results ==
=== Part 1 ===
Class winners denoted in bold.

Pos.	Class	No.	Team	Drivers	Car	Laps	Time/Gap
1	**Pro**	**11**	**(Switzerland) Kessel Racing**	**(Poland) Michał Broniszewski** **(Italy) Davide Rigon** **(Italy) Andrea Piccini**	**Ferrari 458 Italia GT3**	**153**	**6:01:16.886**
2	Pro	2	(Germany) Black Falcon	(Saudi Arabia) Abdulaziz Al Faisal (Germany) Hubert Haupt (Netherlands) Yelmer Buurman	Mercedes-Benz SLS AMG GT3	153	+1:10.921
3	Pro	1	(United Arab Emirates) Abu Dhabi Racing Black Falcon	(United Arab Emirates) Khaled Al Qubaisi (Netherlands) Jeroen Bleekemolen (Germany) Maro Engel	Mercedes-Benz SLS AMG GT3	153	+1:27.799
4	Pro	44	Oman Racing Team	(United Kingdom) Jonathan Adam (Oman) Ahmad Al Harthy (United Kingdom) Darren Turner	Aston Martin V12 Vantage GT3	153	+2:21.164
5	**Pro-Am**	**51**	**(Italy) AF Corse**	**(Switzerland) Thomas Flohr** **(Italy) Francesco Castellacci** **(Italy) Andrea Rizzoli**	**Ferrari 458 Italia GT3**	**150**	**+3 Laps**
6	**Gent**	**65**	**(Switzerland) Kessel Racing**	**(Luxembourg) Alexis De Bernardi** **(Italy) Loris Capirossi** **(Italy) Niki Cadei**	**Ferrari 458 Italia GT3**	**150**	**+3 Laps**
7	Pro-Am	55	(Italy) AF Corse	(South Africa) Jack Gerber (Italy) Marco Cioci (Russia) Ilya Melnikov	Ferrari 458 Italia GT3	150	+3 Laps
8	Gent	99	(Switzerland) Kessel Racing	(Russia) Vadim Gitlin (United Kingdom) Michael Lyons (Italy) Marco Zanuttini	Ferrari 458 Italia GT3	150	+3 Laps
9	Gent	10	(Netherlands) Equipe Verschuur	(Portugal) Miguel Ramos (Portugal) Filipe Barreiros (Belgium) Jerome Naveaux (Belgium) Jean-Pierre Lequeux	Renault R.S. 01	149	+4 Laps
10	Pro	25	(United Kingdom) FF Corse	(United Kingdom) Charlie Hollings (United Kingdom) Ivor Dunbar (United Kingdom) Johnny Mowlem	Ferrari 458 Italia GT3	148	+5 Laps
11	**Cup**	**20**	**(Germany) MRS GT-Racing**	**(United States) Charles Putman** **(United States) Charles Espenlaub** **(Netherlands) Xavier Maassen**	**Porsche 911 GT3 Cup**	**144**	**+9 Laps**
12	Cup	40	(United Kingdom) Brookspeed	(United Kingdom) Graeme Mundy (United Kingdom) Steven Liquorish (Turkey) Salih Yoluç	Porsche 911 GT3 Cup	143	+10 Laps
13	Cup	21	(Germany) MRS GT-Racing	(Taiwan) George Chou (Hong Kong) Samson Chan; Robert Lee (Japan) Naoki Yokomizo	Porsche 911 GT3 Cup	142	+11 Laps
14	Cup	67	(San Marino) GDL Racing	(United States) Jim Michaelian (Kuwait) Bashar Mardini (Italy) Roberto Rayneri	Porsche 911 GT3 Cup	135	+18 Laps
15	Pro-Am	38	(Germany) Black Pearl Racing by Rinaldi	(Germany) Pierre Kaffer (Germany) Steve Parrow (Germany) Alexander Volz	Ferrari 458 Italia GT3	131	+22 Laps
16	**CN2**	**23**	**(Portugal) CRM**	**(Iran) Sam Taheri** **(Qatar) Amro Al Hamad** **(Italy) Angelo Negro** **(Monaco) Philippe Prette**	**Wolf GB08**	**129**	**+24 Laps**
17	Gent	50	(Italy) AF Corse	(Portugal) Francisco Guedes (Russia) Alexander Moiseev (Italy) Riccardo Ragazzi	Ferrari 458 Italia GT3	126	+27 Laps
18 DNF	Gent	88	(United Arab Emirates) Dragon Racing	(France) Frederic Fatien (United Kingdom) John Hartshorne (United Kingdom) Alex Kapadia	Ferrari 458 Italia GT3	64	+89 Laps
19	Cup	87	(San Marino) GDL Racing	(Italy) Mario Cordoni (Italy) Roberto Silva (France) Remi Terrail	Porsche 911 GT3 Cup	61	+92 Laps

=== Part 2 ===
Class winners denoted in bold.

Pos.	Class	No.	Team	Drivers	Car	Laps	Time/Gap
1	**Pro**	**11**	**(Switzerland) Kessel Racing**	**(Poland) Michał Broniszewski** **(Italy) Davide Rigon** **(Italy) Andrea Piccini**	**Ferrari 458 Italia GT3**	**153**	**6:01:16.886**
2	Pro	2	(Germany) Black Falcon	(Saudi Arabia) Abdulaziz Al Faisal (Germany) Hubert Haupt (Netherlands) Yelmer Buurman	Mercedes-Benz SLS AMG GT3	153	+1:10.921
3	Pro	44	Oman Racing Team	(United Kingdom) Jonathan Adam (Oman) Ahmad Al Harthy (United Kingdom) Darren Turner	Aston Martin V12 Vantage GT3	153	+2:21.164
4	**Pro-Am**	**55**	**(Italy) AF Corse**	**(South Africa) Jack Gerber** **(Italy) Marco Cioci** **(Russia) Ilya Melnikov**	**Ferrari 458 Italia GT3**	**150**	**+3 Laps**
5	**Gent**	**99**	**(Switzerland) Kessel Racing**	**(Russia) Vadim Gitlin** **(United Kingdom) Michael Lyons** **(Italy) Marco Zanuttini**	**Ferrari 458 Italia GT3**	**150**	**+3 Laps**
6	Pro-Am	51	(Italy) AF Corse	(Switzerland) Thomas Flohr (Italy) Francesco Castellacci (Italy) Andrea Rizzoli	Ferrari 458 Italia GT3	150	+3 Laps
7	Pro	1	(United Arab Emirates) Abu Dhabi Racing Black Falcon	(United Arab Emirates) Khaled Al Qubaisi (Netherlands) Jeroen Bleekemolen (Germany) Maro Engel	Mercedes-Benz SLS AMG GT3	153	+1:27.799
8	Gent	65	(Switzerland) Kessel Racing	(Luxembourg) Alexis De Bernardi (Italy) Loris Capirossi (Italy) Niki Cadei	Ferrari 458 Italia GT3	150	+3 Laps
9	**Cup**	**20**	**(Germany) MRS GT-Racing**	**(United States) Charles Putman** **(United States) Charles Espenlaub** **(Netherlands) Xavier Maassen**	**Porsche 911 GT3 Cup**	**144**	**+9 Laps**
10	Gent	10	(Netherlands) Equipe Verschuur	(Portugal) Miguel Ramos (Portugal) Filipe Barreiros (Belgium) Jerome Naveaux (Belgium) Jean-Pierre Lequeux	Renault R.S. 01	149	+4 Laps
11	Cup	40	(United Kingdom) Brookspeed	(United Kingdom) Graeme Mundy (United Kingdom) Steven Liquorish (Turkey) Salih Yoluç	Porsche 911 GT3 Cup	143	+10 Laps
12	Cup	21	(Germany) MRS GT-Racing	(Taiwan) George Chou (Hong Kong) Samson Chan; Robert Lee (Japan) Naoki Yokomizo	Porsche 911 GT3 Cup	142	+11 Laps
13	Pro-Am	38	(Germany) Black Pearl Racing by Rinaldi	(Germany) Pierre Kaffer (Germany) Steve Parrow (Germany) Alexander Volz	Ferrari 458 Italia GT3	131	+22 Laps
14	Gent	50	(Italy) AF Corse	(Portugal) Francisco Guedes (Russia) Alexander Moiseev (Italy) Riccardo Ragazzi	Ferrari 458 Italia GT3	126	+27 Laps
15	**CN2**	**23**	**(Portugal) CRM**	**(Iran) Sam Taheri** **(Qatar) Amro Al Hamad** **(Italy) Angelo Negro** **(Monaco) Philippe Prette**	**Wolf GB08**	**129**	**+24 Laps**
16	Cup	67	(San Marino) GDL Racing	(United States) Jim Michaelian (Kuwait) Bashar Mardini (Italy) Roberto Rayneri	Porsche 911 GT3 Cup	135	+18 Laps
17 DNF	Pro	25	(United Kingdom) FF Corse	(United Kingdom) Charlie Hollings (United Kingdom) Ivor Dunbar (United Kingdom) Johnny Mowlem	Ferrari 458 Italia GT3	148	+5 Laps
18 DNF	Cup	87	(San Marino) GDL Racing	(Italy) Mario Cordoni (Italy) Roberto Silva (France) Remi Terrail	Porsche 911 GT3 Cup	61	+92 Laps
DNS	Gent	88	(United Arab Emirates) Dragon Racing	(France) Frederic Fatien (United Kingdom) John Hartshorne (United Kingdom) Alex Kapadia	Ferrari 458 Italia GT3	64	+89 Laps
