= Michał Broniszewski =

Polish former racing driver (born 1972)

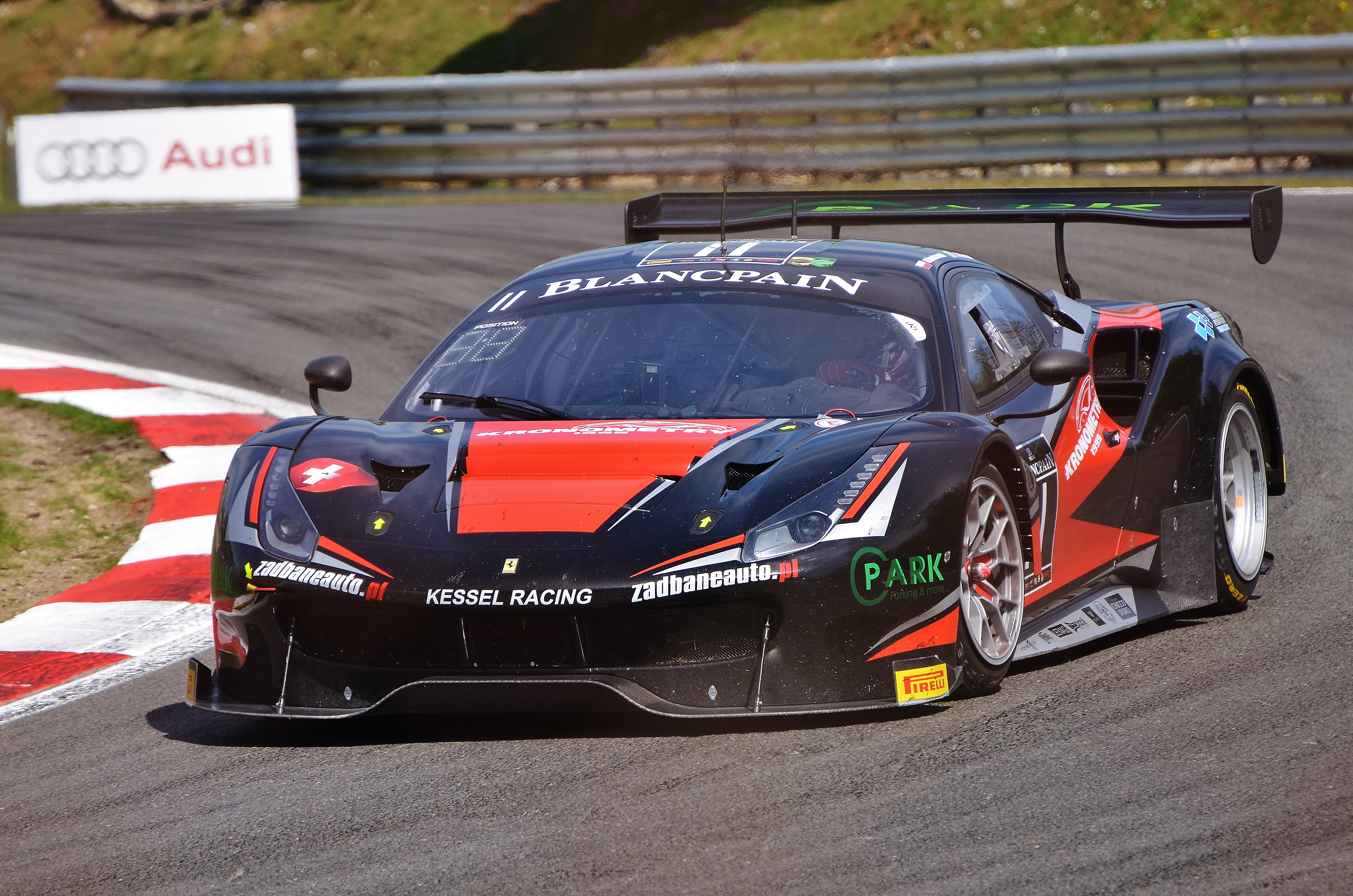
- Broniszewski in 2016
- Nationality: (Poland) Polish
- Born: 21 July 1972 (age 54) Piaseczno, Poland
- Categorisation: FIA Bronze

Championship titles
- 2018 2016 2016 2016 2016 2009: 24H Proto Series - P3; Blancpain GT Series - Pro-Am; Blancpain GT Series Endurance Cup - Pro-Am; Blancpain GT Series Sprint Cup - Pro-Am; Blancpain GT Sports Club - Overall; International GT Open - GTS

Michał Bartosz Broniszewski (born 21 July 1972) is a Polish former racing driver who last competed in the Asian Le Mans Series for Kessel Racing.

A long-time driver for Kessel Racing, Broniszewski won the Gulf 12 Hours four consecutive times between 2015 and 2018. Alongside co-driver Philipp Peter, he also won the GTS championship in the 2009 International GT Open.

In 2016, Broniszewski claimed four Blancpain GT Series titles: the Pro-Am championships in the overall GT Series, Endurance Cup, and Sprint Cup, in addition to the overall GT Sports Club championship.

== Racing record ==
=== Career summary ===
Season	Series	Team	Races	Wins	Poles	F/Laps	Podiums	Points	Position
2007	Ferrari Challenge Europe - Trofeo Pirelli	Kessel Racing	6	0	0	0	0	18	23rd
2008	Ferrari Challenge Europe - Trofeo Pirelli	Kessel Racing	14	0	0	1	1	?	12th
2009	International GT Open	Kessel Racing	16	6	3	4	12	115	7th
2009	International GT Open - GTS	Kessel Racing	14	6	3	4	12	107	**1st**
2009	International GT Open - Super GT	Kessel Racing	2	0	0	0	0	0	NC
2009	Ferrari Challenge Europe - Trofeo Pirelli	Kessel Racing	2	0	0	0	0	23	12th
2010	International GT Open	Kessel Racing	14	0	0	0	4	114	8th
2010	International GT Open - Super GT	Kessel Racing	14	0	0	0	4	46	6th
2010	Italian GT Championship - GT2	Kessel Racing	2	0	0	0	1	19	14th
2011	Le Mans Series - LMGTE Am	Kessel Racing	2	0	0	0	1	0	NC
2011	Le Mans Series - LMGTE Pro	Kessel Racing	1	0	0	0	0	0	NC
2011	Intercontinental Le Mans Cup - LMGTE Am	Kessel Racing	1	0	0	0	0	0	NC
2011	International GT Open	Kessel Racing	14	1	0	0	5	118	14th
2011	International GT Open - Super GT	Kessel Racing	4	0	0	0	1	51	8th
2011	Dubai 24 Hour - A6	AF Corse	1	0	0	0	1	N/A	**2nd**
2012	January Gulf 12 Hours - GT3	Kessel Racing	1	0	?	?	1	N/A	**2nd**
2012	International GT Open	Kessel Racing	15	1	0	0	3	96	10th
2012	International GT Open - Super GT	Kessel Racing	15	1	0	0	3	35	8th
2012	European Le Mans Series - LMGTE Pro	Kessel Racing	1	0	0	0	1	0	NC
2012	December Gulf 12 Hours - GT3	Kessel Racing	1	0	0	0	0	N/A	5th
2013	Winter Series - Super GT	Kessel Racing	2	0	0	0	2	0	NC
2013	Gulf 12 Hours - GT3 Pro-Am	Kessel Racing	1	0	0	0	1	0	**3rd**
2013	International GT Open - Super GT	Kessel Racing	4	1	0	0	1	13	14th
2014	Blancpain Endurance Series - Pro-Am	Kessel Racing	5	0	0	0	0	9	22nd
2014	European Le Mans Series - LMGTE	Kessel Racing	4	0	0	0	0	17	17th
2015	Blancpain GT Series - Overall	Kessel Racing	5	0	0	0	0	18	34th
2015	Blancpain Endurance Series - Pro-Am	Kessel Racing	5	1	0	0	3	63	**2nd**
2015	International GT Open - GT3 Pro-Am	Kessel Racing	2	0	0	0	0	4	15th
2015	Gulf 12 Hours - GT3 Pro	Kessel Racing	1	1	?	?	1	N/A	**1st**
2016	Blancpain GT Series - Pro-Am	Kessel Racing	15	8	3	3	12	245	**1st**
2016	Blancpain GT Series Endurance Cup - Overall	Kessel Racing	5	0	0	0	0	16	26th
2016	Blancpain GT Series Endurance Cup - Pro-Am	Kessel Racing	5	2	0	0	3	102	**1st**
2016	Blancpain GT Series Sprint Cup - Overall	Kessel Racing	10	0	0	0	0	0	NC
2016	Blancpain GT Series Sprint Cup - Pro-Am	Kessel Racing	10	6	3	3	9	143	**1st**
2016	Blancpain GT Sports Club - Overall	Kessel Racing	8	4	4	3	7	105	**1st**
2016	24H Series - A6-Overall	Black Falcon	1	0	0	0	0	0	NC
2016	Gulf 12 Hours - GT3 Pro	Kessel Racing	1	1	1	1	1	N/A	**1st**
2017	24H Series - A6	Black Falcon	1	0	0	0	1	0	NC
2017	Blancpain GT Series Sprint Cup - Overall	Kessel Racing	6	0	0	0	0	0	NC
2017	Blancpain GT Series Sprint Cup - Pro-Am	Kessel Racing	6	2	0	2	3	62	6th
2017	Blancpain GT Series Endurance Cup - Overall	Kessel Racing	5	0	0	0	0	4	35th
2017	Blancpain GT Series Endurance Cup - Pro-Am	Kessel Racing	5	0	1	0	1	34	14th
2017	Gulf 12 Hours - GT Pro	Kessel Racing	1	1	1	0	1	N/A	**1st**
2017	Intercontinental GT Challenge	Kessel Racing	1	0	0	0	0	0	NC
2018	24H Proto Series - P3	Graff	3	1	0	0	3	48	**1st**
2018	Blancpain GT Series Sprint Cup - Overall	Kessel Racing	2	0	0	0	0	0	NC
2018	Blancpain GT Series Sprint Cup - Pro-Am	Kessel Racing	2	0	0	0	2	21.5	4th
2018	Blancpain GT Series Endurance Cup - Overall	Kessel Racing	2	0	0	0	0	0	NC
2018	Blancpain GT Series Endurance Cup - Pro-Am	Kessel Racing	2	0	1	0	0	1	29th
2018	Gulf 12 Hours - GT3 Pro	Kessel Racing	1	1	1	0	1	N/A	**1st**
2020	European Le Mans Series - LMGTE	Kessel Racing	5	2	0	0	4	99	**2nd**
2020	Le Mans Cup - GT3	Kessel Racing	7	0	1	0	5	92	**3rd**
2022	Asian Le Mans Series - GT	Kessel Racing	2	0	0	0	0	2	14th
2023	Asian Le Mans Series - GT	Kessel Racing	2	0	0	0	0	0	22nd

=== Complete European Le Mans Series results ===
(key) (Races in bold indicate pole position; results in italics indicate fastest lap)

Year	Entrant	Class	Chassis	Engine	1	2	3	4	5	Rank	Points
2011	Kessel Racing	LMGTE Am	Ferrari F430 GTE	Ferrari F136 GT 4.0 L V8	LEC; 3	SPA; 7	IMO		EST	NC	0
2011	Kessel Racing	LMGTE Pro	Ferrari 458 Italia GT2	Ferrari F136 4.0 L V8				SIL; Ret		NC	0
2014	Kessel Racing	LMGTE	Ferrari 458 Italia GT2	Ferrari F136 4.0 L V8	SIL; 10	IMO; Ret	RBR	LEC; 5	EST; 7	17th	17
2020	Kessel Racing	LMGTE	Ferrari 488 GTE Evo	Ferrari F154CB 3.9 L Turbo V8	**RIC**; 2	SPA; 1	LEC; 4	MNZ; 1	POR; 2	2nd	99

=== Complete GT World Challenge Europe results ===
==== GT World Challenge Europe Endurance Cup ====
(key) (Races in bold indicate pole position; races in italics indicate fastest lap)

Year	Team	Car	Class	1	2	3	4	5	6	7	Pos.	Points
2014	Kessel Racing	Ferrari 458 Italia GT3	Pro-Am	MNZ; Ret	SIL; 6	LEC; 15	SPA; 6H; 22	SPA; 12H; 18	SPA; 24H; 15	NÜR; 10	22nd	9
2015	Kessel Racing	Ferrari 458 Italia GT3	Pro-Am	MNZ; 3	SIL; 19	LEC; 1	**SPA**; **6H**; 16	SPA; 12H; 19	SPA; 24H; Ret	NÜR; 3	2nd	63
2016	Kessel Racing	Ferrari 488 GT3	Pro-Am	MNZ; 1	SIL; 8	LEC; 1	SPA; 6H; 5	SPA; 12H; 3	SPA; 24H; 5	NÜR; 2	1st	102
2017	Kessel Racing	Ferrari 488 GT3	Pro-Am	MNZ; 2	SIL; 14	**LEC**; 11	SPA; 6H; 5	SPA; 12H; 4	SPA; 24H; Ret	CAT; 8	14th	34
2018	Kessel Racing	Ferrari 488 GT3	Pro-Am	**MNZ**; 5	SIL	LEC	SPA; 6H	SPA; 12H	SPA; 24H	CAT; Ret	29th	1

==== GT World Challenge Europe Sprint Cup ====
(key) (Races in bold indicate pole position; races in italics indicate fastest lap)

Year	Team	Car	Class	1	2	3	4	5	6	7	8	9	10	Pos.	Points
2016	Kessel Racing	Ferrari 488 GT3	Pro-Am	**MIS**; **QR**; 1	MIS; MR; 1	BRH; QR; 2	BRH; MR; 1	**NÜR**; **QR**; 1	NÜR; MR; 1	HUN; QR; 1	HUN; MR; 3	**CAT**; **QR**; 5	CAT; MR; 1	1st	143
2017	Kessel Racing	Ferrari 488 GT3	Pro-Am	MIS; QR; 1	MIS; MR; 4	BRH; QR; 4	BRH; MR; 5	ZOL; QR; 3	ZOL; MR; 1	HUN; QR	HUN; MR	NÜR; QR	NÜR; MR	6th	62
2018	Kessel Racing	Ferrari 488 GT3	Pro-Am	ZOL; 1; 2	ZOL; 2; 3	BRH; 1	BRH; 2	MIS; 1	MIS; 2	HUN; 1	HUN; 2	NÜR; 1	NÜR; 2	4th	21.5

=== Complete Blancpain GT Sports Club ===
(key) (Races in bold indicate pole position; races in italics indicate fastest lap)

Year	Team	Car	1	2	3	4	5	6	7	8	9	10	Pos.	Points
2016	Kessel Racing	Ferrari 458 Italia GTE	MIS; QR; DNS	MIS; MR; DNS									1st	105
2016	Kessel Racing	Ferrari 458 Italia GT3			**BRH**; **QR**; 1	BRH; MR; 1	LEC; QR; 8	LEC; MR; 3	**SPA**; **QR**; 1	SPA; MR; 1	CAT; QR; 2	CAT; MR; 2	1st	105

=== Complete Le Mans Cup results ===
(key) (Races in bold indicate pole position; results in italics indicate fastest lap)

Year	Entrant	Class	Chassis	Engine	1	2	3	4	5	6	7	Rank	Points
2020	Kessel Racing	GT3	Ferrari 488 GT3	Ferrari F154CB 3.9 L Turbo V8	RIC; Ret	SPA; 2	**LEC**; 2	**LMS**; **1**; 2	LMS; 2; 1	MNZ; 4	POR; 2	3rd	92

=== Complete Asian Le Mans Series results ===
(key) (Races in bold indicate pole position; results in italics indicate fastest lap)

Year	Entrant	Class	Chassis	Engine	1	2	3	4	Rank	Points
2022	Kessel Racing	GT	Ferrari 488 GT3 Evo 2020	Ferrari F154CB 3.9 L Turbo V8	DUB; 1 DNS	DUB; 2 DNS	ABU; 1; 10	ABU; 2; 10	14th	2
2023	Kessel Racing	GT	Ferrari 488 GT3 Evo 2020	Ferrari F154CB 3.9 L Turbo V8	DUB; 1 NC	DUB; 2; 13	ABU; 1 DNS	ABU; 2 WD	22nd	0
