= Gulf 12 Hours =

Endurance motor race

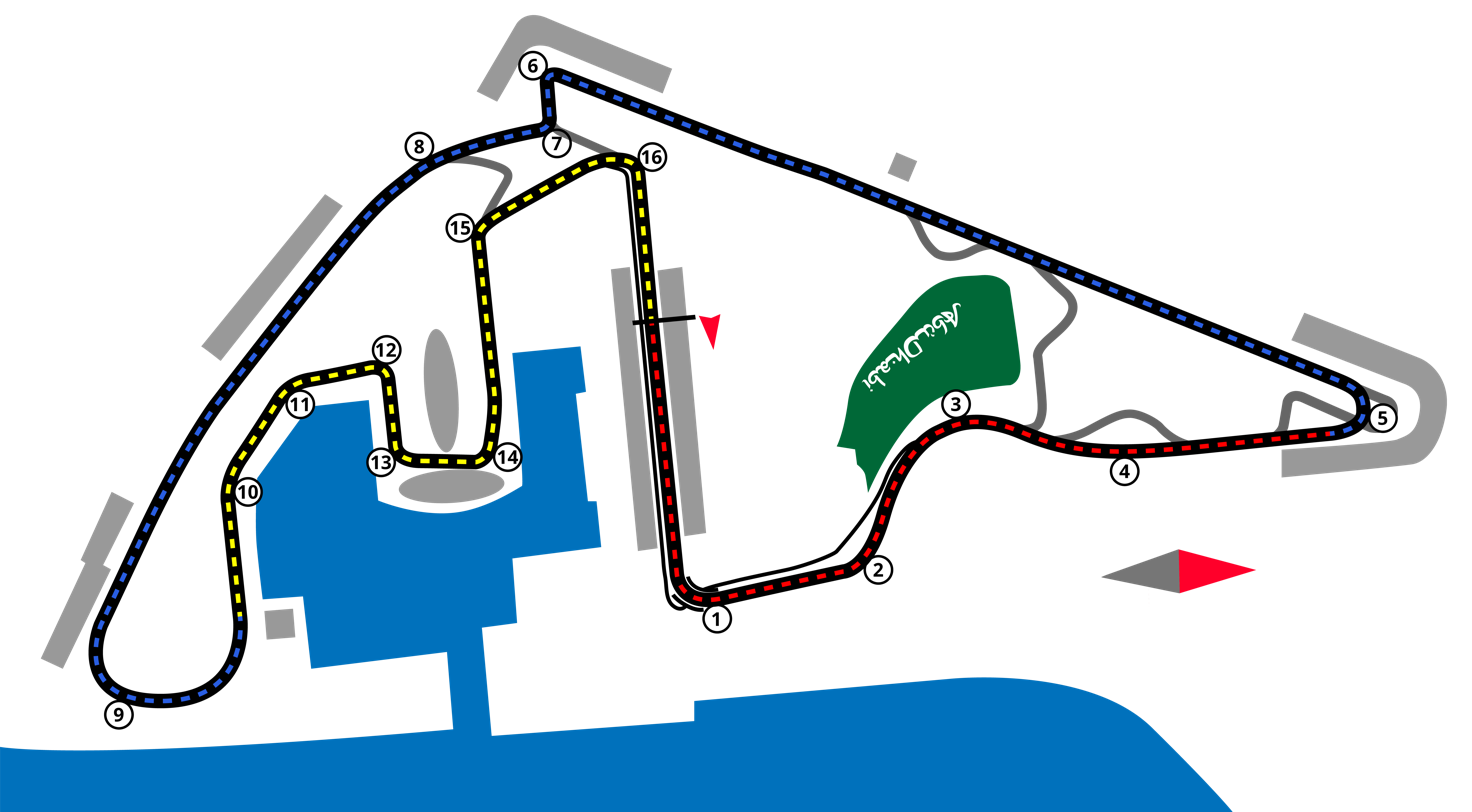
- Venue: Yas Marina Circuit
- Corporate sponsor: Lenovo
- First race: 2012
- Duration: 12 Hours
- Most wins (driver): Davide Rigon (5)
- Most wins (team): Kessel Racing (4); AF Corse (4)
- Most wins (manufacturer): Ferrari (8)

The Gulf 12 Hours is a 12-hour annual GT endurance racing event that usually takes place at the Yas Marina Circuit in the United Arab Emirates during the third Sunday of December, except in 2021 when it was held at the Bahrain International Circuit in January. In 2012 and, for the decennial, in 2022, the race was held twice: in January and December. On 29 July 2022, it was announced that Gulf 12 Hours joined the Intercontinental GT Challenge calendar both in 2022 and 2023. The race did not return as part of the IGTC calendar in 2024 after the two-year contract was not extended.

== Winners ==
Bahrain International Circuit hosted 2020 Gulf 12 Hours in January 2021

Yas Marina Circuit layout used from 2013 to 2019

Year	Drivers	Car	Team	Remarks
2012 (Jan)	(Italy) Marco Cioci (Republic of Ireland) Matt Griffin (Italy) Piergiuseppe Perazzini	Ferrari 458 Italia GT3	(Italy) AF Corse 1	299 Laps. First running of the event.
2012 (Dec)	(Venezuela) Gaetano Ardagna (Italy) Gianmaria Bruni (Finland) Toni Vilander	Ferrari 458 Italia GT3	(Italy) AF Corse 1	309 Laps.
2013	(Germany) Bernd Schneider (Netherlands) Jeroen Bleekemolen (United Arab Emirates) Khaled Al Qubaisi	Mercedes-Benz SLS AMG GT3	(United Arab Emirates) Team Abu Dhabi by Black Falcon Racing	308 laps.
2014	(Italy) Michele Rugolo (Italy) Davide Rigon (Australia) Stephen Wyatt	Ferrari 458 Italia GT3	(Italy) AF Corse	315 laps.
2015	(Poland) Michał Broniszewski (Italy) Davide Rigon (Italy) Giacomo Piccini	Ferrari 458 Italia GT3	(Switzerland) Kessel Racing	301 laps.
2016	(Poland) Michał Broniszewski (Italy) Davide Rigon (Italy) Giacomo Piccini	Ferrari 488 GT3	(Switzerland) Kessel Racing	300 laps.
2017	(Poland) Michał Broniszewski (Italy) Davide Rigon (Spain) Miguel Molina	Ferrari 488 GT3	(Switzerland) Kessel Racing	302 laps completed. Kessel Racing scoring a Hat-trick of wins.
2018	(Poland) Michał Broniszewski (Italy) Davide Rigon (Italy) Alessandro Pier Guidi	Ferrari 488 GT3	(Switzerland) Kessel Racing	313 laps completed. Kessel Racing scoring its record breaking 4th win in a row.
2019	(Germany) Christopher Mies (Russia) Rinat Salikhov (Belgium) Dries Vanthoor	Audi R8 LMS Evo	(Germany) Attempto Racing	316 laps.
2020	Race moved to 2021 due to COVID-19 travel restrictions.			
2021	(Bahrain) Isa Al-Khalifa (United Kingdom) Ben Barnicoat (Croatia) Martin Kodrić	McLaren 720S GT3	(Bahrain) 2 Seas Motorsport	341 laps. This edition was relocated to the Bahrain International Circuit.
2022 (Jan)	(Bahrain) Isa Al-Khalifa (United Kingdom) Ben Barnicoat (Croatia) Martin Kodrić	Mercedes-AMG GT3 Evo	(Bahrain) 2 Seas Motorsport	359 laps. New distance record.
2022 (Dec)	(Italy) Antonio Fuoco (United Kingdom) James Calado (Italy) Alessandro Pier Guidi	Ferrari 488 GT3 Evo 2020	(Italy) AF Corse - Francorchamps Motors	335 laps. First Gulf 12 Hours to be a part of the SRO Intercontinental GT Challenge.
2023	(Germany) Maro Engel (Canada) Mikaël Grenier (Germany) Luca Stolz	Mercedes-AMG GT3 Evo	(Hong Kong) Mercedes-AMG Team GruppeM Racing	348 laps. Last Gulf 12 Hours to be a part of the SRO IGTC.
2024	(Belgium) Gilles Magnus (Germany) Dennis Marschall (China) Bihuang Zhou	Audi R8 LMS Evo II	(France) Saintéloc Racing	353 laps. The No. 69 Optimum Motorsport McLaren driven by Todd Coleman, Frederik Schandorff and Aaron Telitz crossed the finish line first, but lost victory after receiving two 30 second penalties post-race for speeding in pit lane.
2025	Mikhail Aleshin (United Kingdom) Adam Christodoulou; Denis Remenyako	Mercedes-AMG GT3 Evo	(Germany) CapitalRT by Motopark	346 Laps.

== Multiple winners ==
=== By driver ===
Wins	Driver	Years
5	(Italy) Davide Rigon	2014–2018
4	(Poland) Michał Broniszewski	2015–2018
2	(Italy) Giacomo Piccini	2015–2016
2	(Italy) Alessandro Pier Guidi	2018, 2022 (Dec)
2	(Bahrain) Isa Al-Khalifa	2021, 2022 (Jan)
2	(United Kingdom) Ben Barnicoat	2021, 2022 (Jan)
2	(Croatia) Martin Kodrić	2021, 2022 (Jan)

=== By manufacturer ===
Wins	Manufacturer	Years
8	(Italy) Ferrari	2012 (Jan), 2012 (Dec), 2014–2018, 2022 (Dec)
4	(Germany) Mercedes-AMG	2013, 2022 (Jan), 2023, 2025
2	(Germany) Audi	2019, 2024
