= 2018 Gulf 12 Hours =

8th Gulf 12 Hours endurance race

The layout of Yas Marina Circuit

The 2018 Gulf 12 Hours was the eighth edition of the Gulf 12 Hours held at Yas Marina Circuit on 15 December 2018. It was organized by Driving Force Events Ltd. and contested with GT3-spec, GT4-spec, Lamborghini Super Trofeo, Porsche Cup and LMP3 cars.

The race was won by Michał Broniszewski, Davide Rigon and Alessandro Pier Guidi in the #11 Kessel Racing Ferrari 488 GT3.

== Race Results ==
=== Part 1 ===
Class winners denoted in bold.

Pos.	Class	No.	Team	Drivers	Car	Laps	Time/Gap
1	**GT3 Pro**	**88**	**(Germany) Car Collection Motorsport**	**(Germany) Dimitri Parhofer** **(Germany) Christopher Haase** **(Germany) Markus Winkelhock**	**Audi R8 LMS**	**153**	**6:01:26.024**
2	GT3 Pro	5	(United Kingdom) McLaren Customer Racing	(United Kingdom) Ben Barnicoat (Portugal) Álvaro Parente (New Zealand) Shane van Gisbergen	McLaren 720S GT3	153	+26.665
3	GT3 Pro	11	(Switzerland) Kessel Racing	(Poland) Michał Broniszewski (Italy) Davide Rigon (Italy) Alessandro Pier Guidi	Ferrari 488 GT3	153	+1:04.728
4	GT3 Pro	99	(Germany) Attempto Racing	(Slovakia) Stanislav Minsky (Austria) Klaus Bachler (Australia) Nick Foster	Audi R8 LMS	153	+1:18.630
5	GT3 Pro	44	(Germany) Attempto Racing	(United Kingdom) Sean Walkinshaw (Italy) Giorgio Roda (Austria) Clemens Schmid	Audi R8 LMS	153	+2:00.536
6	**GT3 Pro-Am**	**27**	**(Italy) Daiko Lazarus Racing**	**(Portugal) Miguel Ramos** **(Italy) Nicola de Marco** **(Italy) Fabio Onidi**	**Lamborghini Huracán GT3**	**152**	**+1 Lap**
7	GT3 Pro	97	Oman Racing with TF Sport	(Oman) Ahmad Al Harthy (United Kingdom) Jonathan Adam (United Kingdom) Darren Turner	Aston Martin V12 Vantage GT3	152	+1 Lap
8	**Proto**	**4**	**(France) Graff**	**(United Kingdom) James Winslow** **(Australia) Neale Muston** **(Australia) Jake Parsons**	**Norma M30**	**151**	**+2 Laps**
9	GT3 Pro-Am	83	(Switzerland) Kessel Racing	(Italy) Manuela Gostner (Switzerland) Rahel Frey (Denmark) Michelle Gatting	Ferrari 488 GT3	151	+2 Laps
10	GT3 Pro-Am	55	(Germany) Attempto Racing	(Germany) Dietmar Haggenmüller (Austria) Martin Konrad (Germany) Uwe Alzen	Audi R8 LMS	151	+2 Laps
11	GT3 Pro-Am	98	(United Kingdom) Beechdean AMR	(United Kingdom) Andrew Howard (United Arab Emirates) Humaid Al Masaood (United States) Chris Dyson (United Kingdom) Ross Gunn	Aston Martin V12 Vantage GT3	151	+2 Laps
12	GT3 Pro-Am	77	(Switzerland) Kessel Racing	(Italy) Claudio Schiavoni (Italy) Sergio Pianezzola (Italy) Andrea Piccini	Ferrari 488 GT3	150	+3 Laps
13	GT3 Pro-Am	24	(United Arab Emirates) GPX Racing	(Germany) Roald Goethe (United Kingdom) Stuart Hall (France) Frederic Fatien (South Africa) Jordan Grogor	Porsche 911 GT3 R	150	+3 Laps
14	Proto	7	(Italy) Scuderia Villorba Corse	(Switzerland) Mauro Calamia (Italy) Roberto Pampanini (Switzerland) Nicolas Stürzinger (Switzerland) Stefano Monaco	Ligier JS P3	148	+5 Laps
15	**GT Cup**	**87**	**(United Arab Emirates) GDL Racing**	**(Italy) Mario Cordoni** **(United Kingdom) Stephen Liquorish** **(Greece) Dimitris Deverikos**	**Lamborghini Huracán Super Trofeo**	**147**	**+6 Laps**
16	GT Cup	89	(United Arab Emirates) GDL Racing	(United Arab Emirates) Mohammed Hussain (Kuwait) Bashar Mardini (Austria) Christopher Zöchling	Porsche 911 GT3 Cup	147	+6 Laps
17	Proto	70	(France) Graff	(Switzerland) Esteban García (Switzerland) Sébastien Page (Switzerland) Luis San Juan	Ligier JS P3	147	+6 Laps
18	**GT3 Gent**	**33**	**(Switzerland) Kessel Racing**	**(Netherlands) Fons Schelema** **(Turkey) Murat Cuhadaroglu** **(Canada) Rick Lovat** **(Italy) Niki Cadei**	**Ferrari 488 GT3**	**147**	**+6 Laps**
19	GT3 Gent	69	(Italy) Stile F Squadra Corse	(Switzerland) Martin Grab (Hong Kong) Jonathan Hui "Dirk Diggler"	Ferrari 458 Italia GT3	142	+11 Laps
20	GT Cup	80	(United Arab Emirates) GDL Racing	(Italy) Gabriele Murroni (United States) Jim Michaelian (Italy) Roberto Rayneri	Lamborghini Huracán Super Trofeo	142	+11 Laps
21	GT Cup	57	(Thailand) PSC Motorsport	(Malaysia) Afiq Ikhwan Yazid (Thailand) Sarun Sereethoranakul (Thailand) Saravut Sereethoranakul	Lamborghini Huracán Super Trofeo Evo	141	+12 Laps
22	**GT4**	**3**	**(Spain) Bullitt Racing**	**(United Kingdom) Olli Caldwell** **(United Kingdom) Ian Loggie** **(Russia) Oleg Kharuk**	**Mercedes-AMG GT4**	**139**	**+14 Laps**
23	GT4	50	(Italy) Scuderia Villorba Corse	(Italy) Patrick Zamparini (Poland) Piotr Chodzen (Poland) Antoni Chodzen	Maserati GranTurismo MC GT4	139	+14 Laps
24	GT3 Pro	96	(Switzerland) R-Motorsport	(United Kingdom) Jake Dennis (Germany) Marvin Kirchhöfer (United Kingdom) Ricky Collard	Aston Martin V12 Vantage GT3	135	+18 Laps
25	GT4	90	(Italy) Scuderia Villorba Corse	(Italy) Michele Camarlinghi (Italy) Matteo Franceschetti (Italy) Giuseppe Fascicolo (Germany) Thomas Herpell	Maserati GranTurismo MC GT4	134	+19 Laps
26	Proto	39	(France) Graff	(Canada) Sergio Pasian (France) Eric Trouillet (China) Kang Ling (France) Thibault Mourgues	Norma M30	131	+22 Laps
27	GT4	95	(United Kingdom) Aston Martin Racing	(United Kingdom) Thomas Canning (United Kingdom) Mark Farmer (United Kingdom) Oliver Wilkinson (United Kingdom) Adrian Willmott	Aston Martin Vantage GT4	110	+43 Laps
28	GT3 Gent	84	(France) AKKA ASP	(Italy) Mauro Ricci (France) Benjamin Ricci (France) Christophe Bourret (France) Jean-Luc Beaubelique	Mercedes-AMG GT3	75	+78 Laps
29 DNF	GT4	25	(United Kingdom) Ciceley Motorsport	(Saudi Arabia) Issam Charrouf (United Kingdom) Frank Bird (United Kingdom) Jordan Witt	Mercedes-AMG GT4	70	+83 Laps
30 DNF	GT Cup	9	(United Kingdom) Slidesports	(United Kingdom) David Fairbrother (United Kingdom) Colin Paton (United Kingdom) Nigel Armstrong	Porsche 911 GT3 Cup	49	+104 Laps
31 DNF	GT3 Gent	8	(Germany) Car Collection Motorsport	(Germany) Dirg Parhofer (Germany) Maximilian Paul (Spain) Isaac Tutumlu (Germany) Peter Schmidt	Audi R8 LMS	28	+125 Laps
32 DNF	GT3 Gent	51	(Switzerland) Spirit of Race / AF Corse	(Switzerland) Christoph Ulrich (Lebanon) Tani Hanna (Greece) Kriton Lentoudis (Portugal) Rui Aguas	Ferrari 488 GT3	28	+125 Laps
33 DNF	GT4	66	(Spain) Bullitt Racing	(United Kingdom) Andy Meyrick (United Kingdom) Stephen Pattrick (Monaco) Micah Stanley	Mercedes-AMG GT4	15	+138 Laps

=== Part 2 ===
Class winners denoted in bold.

Pos.	Class	No.	Team	Drivers	Car	Laps	Time/Gap
1	**GT3 Pro**	**11**	**(Switzerland) Kessel Racing**	**(Poland) Michał Broniszewski** **(Italy) Davide Rigon** **(Italy) Alessandro Pier Guidi**	**Ferrari 488 GT3**	**313**	**6:00:50.406**
2	GT3 Pro	88	(Germany) Car Collection Motorsport	(Germany) Dimitri Parhofer (Germany) Christopher Haase (Germany) Markus Winkelhock	Audi R8 LMS	313	+27.714
3	GT3 Pro	44	(Germany) Attempto Racing	(United Kingdom) Sean Walkinshaw (Italy) Giorgio Roda (Austria) Clemens Schmid	Audi R8 LMS	313	+1:55.215
4	GT3 Pro	97	Oman Racing with TF Sport	(Oman) Ahmad Al Harthy (United Kingdom) Jonathan Adam (United Kingdom) Darren Turner	Aston Martin V12 Vantage GT3	312	+1 Lap
5	**GT3 Pro-Am**	**27**	**(Italy) Daiko Lazarus Racing**	**(Portugal) Miguel Ramos** **(Italy) Nicola de Marco** **(Italy) Fabio Onidi**	**Lamborghini Huracán GT3**	**310**	**+3 Laps**
6	GT3 Pro-Am	83	(Switzerland) Kessel Racing	(Italy) Manuela Gostner (Switzerland) Rahel Frey (Denmark) Michelle Gatting	Ferrari 488 GT3	309	+4 Laps
7	GT3 Pro-Am	98	(United Kingdom) Beechdean AMR	(United Kingdom) Andrew Howard (United Arab Emirates) Humaid Al Masaood (United States) Chris Dyson (United Kingdom) Ross Gunn	Aston Martin V12 Vantage GT3	309	+4 Laps
8	GT3 Pro	5	(United Kingdom) McLaren Customer Racing	(United Kingdom) Ben Barnicoat (Portugal) Álvaro Parente (New Zealand) Shane van Gisbergen	McLaren 720S GT3	309	+4 Laps
9	**Proto**	**4**	**(France) Graff**	**(United Kingdom) James Winslow** **(Australia) Neale Muston** **(Australia) Jake Parsons**	**Norma M30**	**308**	**+5 Laps**
10	GT3 Pro-Am	55	(Germany) Attempto Racing	(Germany) Dietmar Haggenmüller (Austria) Martin Konrad (Germany) Uwe Alzen	Audi R8 LMS	308	+5 Laps
11	GT3 Pro-Am	24	(United Arab Emirates) GPX Racing	(Germany) Roald Goethe (United Kingdom) Stuart Hall (France) Frederic Fatien (South Africa) Jordan Grogor	Porsche 911 GT3 R	303	+10 Laps
12	Proto	7	(Italy) Scuderia Villorba Corse	(Switzerland) Mauro Calamia (Italy) Roberto Pampanini (Switzerland) Nicolas Stürzinger (Switzerland) Stefano Monaco	Ligier JS P3	303	+10 Laps
13	Proto	70	(France) Graff	(Switzerland) Esteban García (Switzerland) Sébastien Page (Switzerland) Luis San Juan	Ligier JS P3	302	+11 Laps
14	GT3 Pro-Am	77	(Switzerland) Kessel Racing	(Italy) Claudio Schiavoni (Italy) Sergio Pianezzola (Italy) Andrea Piccini	Ferrari 488 GT3	301	+12 Laps
15	**GT Cup**	**87**	**(United Arab Emirates) GDL Racing**	**(Italy) Mario Cordoni** **(United Kingdom) Stephen Liquorish** **(Greece) Dimitris Deverikos**	**Lamborghini Huracán Super Trofeo**	**300**	**+13 Laps**
16	**GT3 Gent**	**33**	**(Switzerland) Kessel Racing**	**(Netherlands) Fons Schelema** **(Turkey) Murat Cuhadaroglu** **(Canada) Rick Lovat** **(Italy) Niki Cadei**	**Ferrari 488 GT3**	**298**	**+15 Laps**
17	GT Cup	89	(United Arab Emirates) GDL Racing	(United Arab Emirates) Mohammed Hussain (Kuwait) Bashar Mardini (Austria) Christopher Zöchling	Porsche 911 GT3 Cup	298	+15 Laps
18	GT3 Pro	96	(Switzerland) R-Motorsport	(United Kingdom) Jake Dennis (Germany) Marvin Kirchhöfer (United Kingdom) Ricky Collard	Aston Martin V12 Vantage GT3	295	+18 Laps
19	GT3 Gent	69	(Italy) Stile F Squadra Corse	(Switzerland) Martin Grab (Hong Kong) Jonathan Hui "Dirk Diggler"	Ferrari 458 Italia GT3	294	+19 Laps
20	**GT4**	**3**	**(Spain) Bullitt Racing**	**(United Kingdom) Olli Caldwell** **(United Kingdom) Ian Loggie** **(Russia) Oleg Kharuk**	**Mercedes-AMG GT4**	**283**	**+30 Laps**
21	GT4	50	(Italy) Scuderia Villorba Corse	(Italy) Patrick Zamparini (Poland) Piotr Chodzen (Poland) Antoni Chodzen	Maserati GranTurismo MC GT4	282	+31 Laps
22	GT4	90	(Italy) Scuderia Villorba Corse	(Italy) Michele Camarlinghi (Italy) Matteo Franceschetti (Italy) Giuseppe Fascicolo (Germany) Thomas Herpell	Maserati GranTurismo MC GT4	274	+39 Laps
23	GT Cup	80	(United Arab Emirates) GDL Racing	(Italy) Gabriele Murroni (United States) Jim Michaelian (Italy) Roberto Rayneri	Lamborghini Huracán Super Trofeo	254	+59 Laps
24	GT4	95	(United Kingdom) Aston Martin Racing	(United Kingdom) Thomas Canning (United Kingdom) Mark Farmer (United Kingdom) Oliver Wilkinson (United Kingdom) Adrian Willmott	Aston Martin Vantage GT4	239	+74 Laps
25	Proto	39	(France) Graff	(Canada) Sergio Pasian (France) Eric Trouillet (China) Kang Ling (France) Thibault Mourgues	Norma M30	238	+75 Laps
26 DNF	GT3 Pro	99	(Germany) Attempto Racing	(Slovakia) Stanislav Minsky (Austria) Klaus Bachler (Australia) Nick Foster	Audi R8 LMS	234	+79 Laps
27	GT3 Gent	84	(France) AKKA ASP	(Italy) Mauro Ricci (France) Benjamin Ricci (France) Christophe Bourret (France) Jean-Luc Beaubelique	Mercedes-AMG GT3	223	+90 Laps
28	GT Cup	57	(Thailand) PSC Motorsport	(Malaysia) Afiq Ikhwan Yazid (Thailand) Sarun Sereethoranakul (Thailand) Saravut Sereethoranakul	Lamborghini Huracán Super Trofeo Evo	223	+90 Laps
29 DNF	GT4	25	(United Kingdom) Ciceley Motorsport	(Saudi Arabia) Issam Charrouf (United Kingdom) Frank Bird (United Kingdom) Jordan Witt	Mercedes-AMG GT4	101	+212 Laps
30 DNS	GT Cup	9	(United Kingdom) Slidesports	(United Kingdom) David Fairbrother (United Kingdom) Colin Paton (United Kingdom) Nigel Armstrong	Porsche 911 GT3 Cup	49	
31 DNS	GT3 Gent	8	(Germany) Car Collection Motorsport	(Germany) Dirg Parhofer (Germany) Maximilian Paul (Spain) Isaac Tutumlu (Germany) Peter Schmidt	Audi R8 LMS	28	
32 DNS	GT3 Gent	51	(Switzerland) Spirit of Race / AF Corse	(Switzerland) Christoph Ulrich (Lebanon) Tani Hanna (Greece) Kriton Lentoudis (Portugal) Rui Aguas	Ferrari 488 GT3	28	
33 DNS	GT4	66	(Spain) Bullitt Racing	(United Kingdom) Andy Meyrick (United Kingdom) Stephen Pattrick (Monaco) Micah Stanley	Mercedes-AMG GT4	15	
