= 2010 International GT Open =

Seasons
- ← 2009 2011 →

The 2010 International GT Open season was the fifth season of the International GT Open. The season commenced on 17 April at Circuit Ricardo Tormo in Valencia and finished on 31 October, at Circuit de Catalunya after 16 races held at eight meetings.

AF Corse wrapped up three different championships during the season, winning both Super GT titles for drivers Álvaro Barba and Pierre Kaffer as well as the teams title having run as many as five cars during the season. Kaffer and Barba took the overall title by five points ahead of Autorlando Sport's pairing Gianluca Roda and Richard Lietz. A further two points behind were the Edil Cris pairing of Raffaele Giammaria and Enrico Toccacelo, who finished ten points ahead of IMSA Performance's Raymond Narac and Patrick Pilet. The four pairings remained in the same order in the Super GT championship standings, with Barba and Kaffer, and Narac and Pilet winning the most races with four. Two victories were taken by Lietz and Roda, and Giammaria and Toccacelo, with other victories taken by CRS Racing's Tim Mullen, who took three wins – two with Chris Niarchos and one with Adam Christodoulou – while the other victory was secured by Villois Racing's Massimiliano Wiser and Lucas Guerrero.

A strong end of season run by Kessel Racing's Marco Frezza helped him claim the GTS title, with three successive wins allowing him to overhaul a 16-point deficit to Jean-Philippe Dayraut of Luxury Racing. Frezza took five wins overall on the season, two with Pedro Couceiro and three with Niki Cadei. Dayraut took four wins, three with Stéphane Ortelli and one with Johan-Boris Scheier. Third place was taken by Frezza's team-mates at Kessel Racing, Lorenzo Bontempelli and Stefano Livio, who took race victories at Imola, Brands Hatch and Monza. Other victories were taken by Dimitris Deverikos and Thomas Gruber, and Andrea Cecatto and Alessio Salucci at Valencia, Duncan Cameron and Matt Griffin at Brands Hatch, and Stefano Borghi and Gianluca de Lorenzi at Circuit de Spa-Francorchamps. Kessel Racing easily won the teams title, scoring more than double the points of runners-up Luxury Racing. Frezza finished as the highest GTS driver in the overall standings, in tenth position ahead of Dayraut.

== Entry list ==
2010 Entry List
Team	No.	Drivers	Chassis	Engine	Class	Rounds
(Italy) Autorlando Sport	2	(Austria) Richard Lietz	Porsche 997 GT3-RSR	Porsche 4.0 L Flat-6	SGT	All
(Italy) Autorlando Sport	2	(Italy) Gianluca Roda	Porsche 997 GT3-RSR	Porsche 4.0 L Flat-6	SGT	All
(Italy) Autorlando Sport	3	(Germany) Wolfgang Kaufmann	Porsche 997 GT3-RSR	Porsche 4.0 L Flat-6	SGT	1–4
(Italy) Autorlando Sport	3	(Italy) Luca Moro	Porsche 997 GT3-RSR	Porsche 4.0 L Flat-6	SGT	1–4
(Italy) Autorlando Sport	65	(Austria) Thomas Gruber	Porsche 997 GT3-R	Porsche 4.0 L Flat-6	GTS	1–7
(Italy) Autorlando Sport	65	(Greece) Dimitris Deverikos	Porsche 997 GT3-R	Porsche 4.0 L Flat-6	GTS	1–7
(Italy) AF Corse	4	(France) Yannick Malegol	Ferrari F430 GT2	Ferrari 4.0 L V8	SGT	4, 8
(Italy) AF Corse	4	(France) Jean-Marc Bachelier	Ferrari F430 GT2	Ferrari 4.0 L V8	SGT	4, 8
(Italy) AF Corse	5	(Portugal) Rui Águas	Ferrari F430 GT2	Ferrari 4.0 L V8	SGT	4
(Italy) AF Corse	5	(Italy) Alessandro Garofano	Ferrari F430 GT2	Ferrari 4.0 L V8	SGT	4, 7–8
(Italy) AF Corse	5	(Italy) Luca Rangoni	Ferrari F430 GT2	Ferrari 4.0 L V8	SGT	7–8
(Italy) AF Corse	6	(South Africa) Jack Gerber	Ferrari F430 GT2	Ferrari 4.0 L V8	SGT	1–5, 7–8
(Italy) AF Corse	6	(Portugal) Rui Águas	Ferrari F430 GT2	Ferrari 4.0 L V8	SGT	1
(Italy) AF Corse	6	(Republic of Ireland) Matt Griffin	Ferrari F430 GT2	Ferrari 4.0 L V8	SGT	2–5, 7–8
(Italy) AF Corse	8	(Spain) Álvaro Barba	Ferrari F430 GT2	Ferrari 4.0 L V8	SGT	All
(Italy) AF Corse	8	(Germany) Pierre Kaffer	Ferrari F430 GT2	Ferrari 4.0 L V8	SGT	All
(Italy) AF Corse	28	(United States) Robert Kauffmann	Ferrari F430 GT2	Ferrari 4.0 L V8	SGT	8
(Portugal) Vodafone Team (Portugal) Sports & You	007	(Portugal) António Coimbra	Aston Martin DBRS9	Aston Martin 6.0 L V12	GTS	1, 4
(Portugal) Vodafone Team (Portugal) Sports & You	007	(Portugal) Luís Silva	Aston Martin DBRS9	Aston Martin 6.0 L V12	GTS	1, 4
(Austria) AT Racing (Italy) AF Corse	7	(Belarus) Alexander Talkanitsa Sr.	Ferrari F430 GT2	Ferrari 4.0 L V8	SGT	All
(Austria) AT Racing (Italy) AF Corse	7	(Belarus) Alexander Talkanitsa Jr.	Ferrari F430 GT2	Ferrari 4.0 L V8	SGT	All
(Italy) Racing Team EdilCris	9	(Italy) Raffaele Giammaria	Ferrari F430 GT2	Ferrari 4.0 L V8	SGT	All
(Italy) Racing Team EdilCris	9	(Italy) Enrico Toccacelo	Ferrari F430 GT2	Ferrari 4.0 L V8	SGT	All
(Switzerland) Kessel Racing	11	(Austria) Philipp Peter	Ferrari F430 GT2	Ferrari 4.0 L V8	SGT	1–4, 6–8
(Switzerland) Kessel Racing	11	(Poland) Michał Broniszewski	Ferrari F430 GT2	Ferrari 4.0 L V8	SGT	1–4, 6–8
(Switzerland) Kessel Racing	46	(Italy) Andrea Ceccato	Ferrari 430 Scuderia	Ferrari 4.5 L V8	GTS	1, 5
(Switzerland) Kessel Racing	46	(Italy) Alessio Salucci	Ferrari 430 Scuderia	Ferrari 4.5 L V8	GTS	1, 5
(Switzerland) Kessel Racing	51	(Italy) Lorenzo Bontempelli	Ferrari 430 Scuderia	Ferrari 4.5 L V8	GTS	All
(Switzerland) Kessel Racing	51	(Italy) Stefano Livio	Ferrari 430 Scuderia	Ferrari 4.5 L V8	GTS	All
(Switzerland) Kessel Racing	66	(Portugal) Pedro Couceiro	Ferrari 430 Scuderia	Ferrari 4.5 L V8	GTS	1–6
(Switzerland) Kessel Racing	66	(Italy) Marco Frezza	Ferrari 430 Scuderia	Ferrari 4.5 L V8	GTS	All
(Switzerland) Kessel Racing	66	(Italy) Niki Cadei	Ferrari 430 Scuderia	Ferrari 4.5 L V8	GTS	7–8
(Switzerland) Kessel Racing	67	(Germany) Freddy Kremer	Ferrari 430 Scuderia	Ferrari 4.5 L V8	GTS	1–5, 7–8
(Switzerland) Kessel Racing	67	(Switzerland) Ronnie Kessel	Ferrari 430 Scuderia	Ferrari 4.5 L V8	GTS	1
(Switzerland) Kessel Racing	67	(Switzerland) Brian Lavio	Ferrari 430 Scuderia	Ferrari 4.5 L V8	GTS	2–3, 5, 7
(Switzerland) Kessel Racing	67	(Italy) Beniamino Caccia	Ferrari 430 Scuderia	Ferrari 4.5 L V8	GTS	4, 8
(Italy) Villois Racing	12	(Spain) Lucas Guerrero	Aston Martin V8 Vantage GT2	Aston Martin 4.5 L V8	SGT	1–7
(Italy) Villois Racing	12	(Italy) Massimiliano Wiser	Aston Martin V8 Vantage GT2	Aston Martin 4.5 L V8	SGT	All
(Italy) Villois Racing	12	(Italy) Gabriele Lancieri	Aston Martin V8 Vantage GT2	Aston Martin 4.5 L V8	SGT	8
(Italy) Villois Racing	52	(Italy) Angelo Lancelotti	Aston Martin DBRS9	Aston Martin 6.0 L V12	GTS	1–5
(Italy) Villois Racing	52	(Italy) Gabriele Lancieri	Aston Martin DBRS9	Aston Martin 6.0 L V12	GTS	1–7
(Italy) Villois Racing	52	(Italy) Max Busnelli	Aston Martin DBRS9	Aston Martin 6.0 L V12	GTS	6–7
(Italy) Villois Racing	53	(Italy) Enrico Crespi	Aston Martin DBRS9	Aston Martin 6.0 L V12	GTS	2
(Italy) Villois Racing	53	(Italy) Gianandrea Crespi	Aston Martin DBRS9	Aston Martin 6.0 L V12	GTS	2–7
(Italy) Villois Racing	53	(Italy) Giovanni Sada	Aston Martin DBRS9	Aston Martin 6.0 L V12	GTS	3
(Italy) Villois Racing	53	(Italy) Max Busnelli	Aston Martin DBRS9	Aston Martin 6.0 L V12	GTS	5
(Italy) Villois Racing	53	(Italy) Matteo Giordano	Aston Martin DBRS9	Aston Martin 6.0 L V12	GTS	6–8
(Italy) Villois Racing	53	(Italy) Andrea Wiser	Aston Martin DBRS9	Aston Martin 6.0 L V12	GTS	8
(Spain) Sunred Engineering	14; 33	(Spain) Fernando Monje	Sun Red SR21; Sun Rred SRX	Judd GV4 4.0L V10	SGT	1, 5, 7–8
(Spain) Sunred Engineering	14; 33	(Spain) Jordi Gené	Sun Red SR21; Sun Rred SRX	Judd GV4 4.0L V10	SGT	1, 5, 7–8
(France) IMSA Performance Matmut	16	(France) Raymond Narac	Porsche 997 GT3-RSR	Porsche 4.0 L Flat-6	SGT	All
(France) IMSA Performance Matmut	16	(France) Patrick Pilet	Porsche 997 GT3-RSR	Porsche 4.0 L Flat-6	SGT	All
(Portugal) Aurora Racing Team	22	(Brazil) Nelson Piquet Jr.	Ferrari F430 GT2	Ferrari 4.0 L V8	SGT	8
(Portugal) Aurora Racing Team	22	(Portugal) Álvaro Parente	Ferrari F430 GT2	Ferrari 4.0 L V8	SGT	8
(Portugal) Aurora Racing Team	30	(Portugal) Álvaro Parente	Ferrari F430 GT2	Ferrari 4.0 L V8	SGT	1
(Portugal) Aurora Racing Team	30	(Portugal) Francisco Cruz Martins	Ferrari F430 GT2	Ferrari 4.0 L V8	SGT	1
(Portugal) Aurora Racing Team	31	(Argentina) Juan Manuel López	Ferrari F430 GT2	Ferrari 4.0 L V8	SGT	1
(Portugal) Aurora Racing Team	31	(Portugal) Manuel Gião	Ferrari F430 GT2	Ferrari 4.0 L V8	SGT	1
(Monaco) JMB Racing	24	(France) Emmanuel Collard	Ferrari F430 GT2	Ferrari 4.0 L V8	SGT	8
(Monaco) JMB Racing	24	(France) Dino Lunardi	Ferrari F430 GT2	Ferrari 4.0 L V8	SGT	8
(Spain) Drivex	32	(Portugal) Miguel Amaral	Ferrari F430 GT2; Porsche 997 GT3-RSR	Ferrari 4.0 L V8; Porsche 4.0 L Flat-6	SGT	1, 3, 8
(Spain) Drivex	32	(Spain) Miguel Ángel de Castro	Ferrari F430 GT2; Porsche 997 GT3-RSR	Ferrari 4.0 L V8; Porsche 4.0 L Flat-6	SGT	1, 3, 8
(Spain) Zener Racing Team	34	(Spain) Francesc Gutiérrez	Mosler MT900R	Chevrolet LS7 7.0L V8	SGT	1
(Spain) Zener Racing Team	34	(Spain) Alfredo Palencia	Mosler MT900R	Chevrolet LS7 7.0L V8	SGT	1
(Spain) Zener Racing Team	82	(Spain) Alfredo Palencia	Ferrari 430 Scuderia	Ferrari 4.5 L V8	GTS	8
(Spain) Zener Racing Team	82	(Spain) Ton Puig	Ferrari 430 Scuderia	Ferrari 4.5 L V8	GTS	8
(France) PRO-GT by Alméras	34	(France) Jean-Luc Beaubelique	Porsche 997 GT3-R	Porsche 4.0 L Flat-6	GTS	7
(France) PRO-GT by Alméras	34	(France) Christian Moullin Traffort	Porsche 997 GT3-R	Porsche 4.0 L Flat-6	GTS	7
(France) PRO-GT by Alméras	34	(France) Sébastien Loeb	Porsche 997 GT3-R	Porsche 4.0 L Flat-6	GTS	8
(France) PRO-GT by Alméras	34	(Spain) Dani Sordo	Porsche 997 GT3-R	Porsche 4.0 L Flat-6	GTS	8
(France) PRO-GT by Alméras	83	(France) Nicolas Armengol	Porsche 997 GT3 Cup	Porsche 3.6 L Flat-6	GTS	8
(France) PRO-GT by Alméras	83	(Switzerland) Fabio Spirgi	Porsche 997 GT3 Cup	Porsche 3.6 L Flat-6	GTS	8
(France) PRO-GT by Alméras	85	(France) Sébastien Blugeon	Porsche 997 GT3 Cup	Porsche 3.6 L Flat-6	GTS	8
(France) PRO-GT by Alméras	85	(France) Christian Blugeon	Porsche 997 GT3 Cup	Porsche 3.6 L Flat-6	GTS	8
(Spain) Jesús Díez	35	(Spain) Jesús Díez	Ferrari F430 GT2	Ferrari 4.0 L V8	SGT	1
(Spain) Jesús Díez	35	(Spain) Máximo Cortés	Ferrari F430 GT2	Ferrari 4.0 L V8	SGT	1
Automóbil Club d'Andorra (Spain) RCA Racing	36	(Andorra) Manel Cerqueda	Ferrari F430 GT2	Ferrari 4.0 L V8	SGT	7–8
Automóbil Club d'Andorra (Spain) RCA Racing	36	(Andorra) Sintu Vives	Ferrari F430 GT2	Ferrari 4.0 L V8	SGT	7–8
(France) Sofrev-ASP	56	(France) Maurice Ricci	Ferrari F430	Ferrari 4.0 L V8	GTS	1, 3–4, 8
(France) Sofrev-ASP	56	(France) Mike Savary	Ferrari F430	Ferrari 4.0 L V8	GTS	1, 3–4, 8
(France) Sofrev-ASP	57	(France) Gabriel Balthazard	Ferrari F430 GT3; Ferrari F430 GT2	Ferrari 4.3 L V8; Ferrari 4.0 L V8	GTS; SGT	1, 3–4; 8
(France) Sofrev-ASP	57	(France) Jean-Luc Beaubelique	Ferrari F430 GT3; Ferrari F430 GT2	Ferrari 4.3 L V8; Ferrari 4.0 L V8	GTS; SGT	1, 3–4; 8
(Netherlands) Brinkmann Motorsport	58	(Netherlands) Siebrand Dijkstra	Audi R8 LMS	Audi 5.2 L V10	GTS	1–4
(Netherlands) Brinkmann Motorsport	58	(Netherlands) Arjan van der Zwaan	Audi R8 LMS	Audi 5.2 L V10	GTS	1–4
(Germany) Phoenix Racing	59	(United States) Jim Matthews	Audi R8 LMS	Audi 5.2 L V10	GTS	1–3
(Germany) Phoenix Racing	59	(Germany) Marcel Tiemann	Audi R8 LMS	Audi 5.2 L V10	GTS	1–3
(France) Protonic Racing (Belgium) First Motorsport	61	(France) Daniel Desbruères	Ferrari 430 Scuderia	Ferrari 4.5 L V8	GTS	1–2, 4–5
(France) Protonic Racing (Belgium) First Motorsport	61	(Belgium) Christian Kelders	Ferrari 430 Scuderia	Ferrari 4.5 L V8	GTS	1–2, 4
(France) Protonic Racing (Belgium) First Motorsport	61	(France) Jean-Marc Bachelier	Ferrari 430 Scuderia	Ferrari 4.5 L V8	GTS	5
(United Kingdom) RPM Motorsport	62	(United Kingdom) Alex Mortimer	Ford GT GT3	Ford 5.4 L V8 S/C	GTS	All
(United Kingdom) RPM Motorsport	62	(United Kingdom) Peter Bamford	Ford GT GT3	Ford 5.4 L V8 S/C	GTS	All
(France) Luxury Racing	63	(France) Jean-Philippe Dayraut	Ferrari 430 Scuderia	Ferrari 4.5 L V8	GTS	1–4
(France) Luxury Racing	63	(Monaco) Stéphane Ortelli	Ferrari 430 Scuderia	Ferrari 4.5 L V8	GTS	1–3
(France) Luxury Racing	63	(France) Frédéric Makowiecki	Ferrari 430 Scuderia	Ferrari 4.5 L V8	GTS	4–5, 8
(France) Luxury Racing	63	(France) Jean-Yves Adam	Ferrari 430 Scuderia	Ferrari 4.5 L V8	GTS	5
(France) Luxury Racing	63	(Portugal) Pedro Couceiro	Ferrari 430 Scuderia	Ferrari 4.5 L V8	GTS	8
(France) Luxury Racing	72	(France) Jérôme Demay	Ferrari 430 Scuderia	Ferrari 4.5 L V8	GTS	4
(France) Luxury Racing	72	(France) Benjamin Rouget	Ferrari 430 Scuderia	Ferrari 4.5 L V8	GTS	4
(France) Luxury Racing	72	(France) Jean-Philippe Dayraut	Ferrari 430 Scuderia	Ferrari 4.5 L V8	GTS	5–8
(France) Luxury Racing	72	(Monaco) Stéphane Ortelli	Ferrari 430 Scuderia	Ferrari 4.5 L V8	GTS	5–8
(France) Sport Garage	64	(France) Michael Petit	Ferrari 430 Scuderia	Ferrari 4.5 L V8	GTS	1–2
(France) Sport Garage	64	(France) Johan-Boris Scheier	Ferrari 430 Scuderia	Ferrari 4.5 L V8	GTS	1–2
(France) Sport Garage	73	(France) Bruce Lorgère-Roux	Ferrari 430 Scuderia	Ferrari 4.5 L V8	GTS	4
(France) Sport Garage	73	(France) Julien Rodrigues	Ferrari 430 Scuderia	Ferrari 4.5 L V8	GTS	4
(Italy) De Lorenzi Racing	68	(Italy) Gianluca de Lorenzi	Porsche 997 GT3-R	Porsche 4.0 L Flat-6	GTS	4
(Italy) De Lorenzi Racing	68	(Italy) Stefano Borghi	Porsche 997 GT3-R	Porsche 4.0 L Flat-6	GTS	4
(Germany) Manthey Racing	69	(Germany) Marc Lieb	Porsche 997 GT3-R	Porsche 4.0 L Flat-6	GTS	4
(Germany) Manthey Racing	69	(Germany) Mark Bullitt	Porsche 997 GT3-R	Porsche 4.0 L Flat-6	GTS	4
(Germany) Vulkan Racing (Germany) Mintgen Motorsport	70	(Germany) Dirk Riebensahm	Dodge Viper Competition Coupe	Dodge 8.3 L V10	GTS	4
(Germany) Vulkan Racing (Germany) Mintgen Motorsport	70	(Germany) Christopher Brück	Dodge Viper Competition Coupe	Dodge 8.3 L V10	GTS	4, 8
(Germany) Vulkan Racing (Germany) Mintgen Motorsport	70	(Germany) Sascha Bert	Dodge Viper Competition Coupe	Dodge 8.3 L V10	GTS	8
(United Kingdom) Trackspeed	74	(United Kingdom) David Ashburn	Porsche 997 GT3-R	Porsche 4.0 L Flat-6	GTS	6
(United Kingdom) Trackspeed	74	(Germany) Sebastian Asch	Porsche 997 GT3-R	Porsche 4.0 L Flat-6	GTS	6
(United Kingdom) Craig Wilkins	75	(United Kingdom) Craig Wilkins	Dodge Viper Competition Coupe	Dodge 8.3 L V10	GTS	6
(United Kingdom) Craig Wilkins	75	(United Kingdom) Aaron Scott	Dodge Viper Competition Coupe	Dodge 8.3 L V10	GTS	6
(United Kingdom) Rollcentre Racing	76	(United Kingdom) Martin Short	Mosler MT900	Chevrolet LS7 7.0 L V8	GTS	6, 8
(United Kingdom) Rollcentre Racing	76	(United Kingdom) Steve Quick	Mosler MT900	Chevrolet LS7 7.0 L V8	GTS	6, 8
(United Kingdom) MTech	77	(United Kingdom) Duncan Cameron	Ferrari 430 Scuderia	Ferrari 4.5 L V8	GTS	6, 8
(United Kingdom) MTech	77	(Republic of Ireland) Matt Griffin	Ferrari 430 Scuderia	Ferrari 4.5 L V8	GTS	6
(United Kingdom) MTech	77	(United Kingdom) Daniel Brown	Ferrari 430 Scuderia	Ferrari 4.5 L V8	GTS	8
(Portugal) Novadriver Racing Team	80	(Portugal) César Campaniço	Audi R8 LMS	Audi 5.2 L V10	GTS	8
(Portugal) Novadriver Racing Team	80	(Portugal) João Pedro Figueiredo	Audi R8 LMS	Audi 5.2 L V10	GTS	8
(Spain) Canarias Sport Club	81	(Spain) Antonio Escámez	Lamborghini Gallardo GT3	Lamborghini 5.0 L V10	GTS	1
(Spain) Canarias Sport Club	81	(Spain) Luis Monzón	Lamborghini Gallardo GT3	Lamborghini 5.0 L V10	GTS	1
(France) Ruffier Racing	81	(France) Jacques Medard	Lamborghini Gallardo GT3	Lamborghini 5.0 L V10	GTS	8
(France) Ruffier Racing	81	(France) Arthur Bleynie	Lamborghini Gallardo GT3	Lamborghini 5.0 L V10	GTS	8
(Netherlands) Marcos Racing International	83	(Netherlands) Cornelius Euser	Marcos Mantis	Ford MOD 4.6L V8	GTS	1
(Netherlands) Marcos Racing International	83	(Netherlands) Rob van der Zwaan	Marcos Mantis	Ford MOD 4.6L V8	GTS	1
(France) Noël del Bello Racing	84	(France) Christophe Caternet	Lamborghini Gallardo GT3	Lamborghini 5.0 L V10	GTS	1
(France) Noël del Bello Racing	84	(France) Patrick Caternet	Lamborghini Gallardo GT3	Lamborghini 5.0 L V10	GTS	1
(Germany) Hermes Attempto Racing	86	(Germany) Masood Azadpour	Porsche 997 GT3 Cup	Porsche 3.6 L Flat-6	GTS	8
(Germany) Hermes Attempto Racing	86	(Germany) Bernd Kleinback	Porsche 997 GT3 Cup	Porsche 3.6 L Flat-6	GTS	8
(Germany) Hermes Attempto Racing	87	(France) Nicolas Armindo	Porsche 997 GT3 Cup	Porsche 3.6 L Flat-6	GTS	8
(Germany) Hermes Attempto Racing	87	(Germany) Jürgen Haring	Porsche 997 GT3 Cup	Porsche 3.6 L Flat-6	GTS	8
(United Kingdom) CRS Racing	90	(United Kingdom) Chris Goodwin	Ferrari F430 GT2	Ferrari 4.0 L V8	SGT	1–3, 6–8
(United Kingdom) CRS Racing	90	(Netherlands) Klaas Hummel	Ferrari F430 GT2	Ferrari 4.0 L V8	SGT	All
(United Kingdom) CRS Racing	90	(United Kingdom) Andrew Kirkaldy	Ferrari F430 GT2	Ferrari 4.0 L V8	SGT	4–5
(United Kingdom) CRS Racing	91	(United Kingdom) Tim Mullen	Ferrari F430 GT2	Ferrari 4.0 L V8	SGT	All
(United Kingdom) CRS Racing	91	(Canada) Chris Niarchos	Ferrari F430 GT2	Ferrari 4.0 L V8	SGT	1–6
(United Kingdom) CRS Racing	91	(United Kingdom) Adam Christodoulou	Ferrari F430 GT2	Ferrari 4.0 L V8	SGT	7–8
(Netherlands) Peter Versluis	130	(Netherlands) Peter Versluis	Ferrari F430 GT2	Ferrari 4.0 L V8	SGT	1–4
(Netherlands) Peter Versluis	130	(Netherlands) Rob van der Zwaan	Ferrari F430 GT2	Ferrari 4.0 L V8	SGT	2
(Netherlands) Peter Versluis	130	(Belgium) Armand Fumal	Ferrari F430 GT2	Ferrari 4.0 L V8	SGT	4

Icon	Class
GTS	GTS Class
SGT	Super GT Class

== Calendar ==
The calendar was last modified on 5 February 2010, having been first announced on 15 December 2009. Older provisional schedules included races at Autódromo Internacional do Algarve and Donington Park. Several rounds were held along with the Auto GP and supported by the European F3 Open Championship.

Round		Circuit	Date	SGT winner	GTS winner
1	R1	(Spain) Circuit Ricardo Tormo, Valencia	17 April	#8 AF Corse	#65 Autorlando Sport
1	R1	(Spain) Circuit Ricardo Tormo, Valencia	17 April	(Spain) Álvaro Barba (Germany) Pierre Kaffer	(Austria) Thomas Gruber (Greece) Dimitris Deverikos
1	R2	(Spain) Circuit Ricardo Tormo, Valencia	18 April	#8 AF Corse	#46 Kessel Racing
1	R2	(Spain) Circuit Ricardo Tormo, Valencia	18 April	(Spain) Álvaro Barba (Germany) Pierre Kaffer	(Italy) Andrea Ceccato (Italy) Alessio Salucci
2	R1	(Germany) Nürburgring	1 May	#16 IMSA Performance Matmut	#63 Luxury Racing
2	R1	(Germany) Nürburgring	1 May	(France) Raymond Narac (France) Patrick Pilet	(France) Jean-Philippe Dayraut (Monaco) Stéphane Ortelli
2	R2	(Germany) Nürburgring	2 May	#8 AF Corse	#63 Luxury Racing
2	R2	(Germany) Nürburgring	2 May	(Spain) Álvaro Barba (Germany) Pierre Kaffer	(France) Jean-Philippe Dayraut (Monaco) Stéphane Ortelli
3	R1	(Italy) Autodromo Enzo e Dino Ferrari, Imola	22 May	#8 AF Corse	#51 Kessel Racing
3	R1	(Italy) Autodromo Enzo e Dino Ferrari, Imola	22 May	(Spain) Álvaro Barba (Germany) Pierre Kaffer	(Italy) Lorenzo Bontempelli (Italy) Stefano Livio
3	R2	(Italy) Autodromo Enzo e Dino Ferrari, Imola	23 May	#91 CRS Racing	#63 Luxury Racing
3	R2	(Italy) Autodromo Enzo e Dino Ferrari, Imola	23 May	(United Kingdom) Tim Mullen (Canada) Chris Niarchos	(France) Jean-Philippe Dayraut (France) Johan-Boris Scheier
4	R1	(Belgium) Circuit de Spa-Francorchamps	26 June	#9 EdilCris Racing Team	#66 Kessel Racing
4	R1	(Belgium) Circuit de Spa-Francorchamps	26 June	(Italy) Raffaele Giammaria (Italy) Enrico Toccacelo	(Portugal) Pedro Couceiro (Italy) Marco Frezza
4	R2	(Belgium) Circuit de Spa-Francorchamps	27 June	#91 CRS Racing	#68 De Lorenzi Racing
4	R2	(Belgium) Circuit de Spa-Francorchamps	27 June	(United Kingdom) Tim Mullen (Canada) Chris Niarchos	(Italy) Stefano Borghi (Italy) Gianluca de Lorenzi
5	R1	(France) Circuit de Nevers Magny-Cours	10 July	#16 IMSA Performance Matmut	#66 Kessel Racing
5	R1	(France) Circuit de Nevers Magny-Cours	10 July	(France) Raymond Narac (France) Patrick Pilet	(Portugal) Pedro Couceiro (Italy) Marco Frezza
5	R2	(France) Circuit de Nevers Magny-Cours	11 July	#2 Autorlando Sport	#72 Luxury Racing
5	R2	(France) Circuit de Nevers Magny-Cours	11 July	(Austria) Richard Lietz (Italy) Gianluca Roda	(France) Jean-Philippe Dayraut (Monaco) Stéphane Ortelli
6	R1	(United Kingdom) Brands Hatch	18 September	#12 Villois Racing	#77 MTech
6	R1	(United Kingdom) Brands Hatch	18 September	(Spain) Lucas Guerrero (Italy) Massimiliano Wiser	(United Kingdom) Duncan Cameron (Republic of Ireland) Matt Griffin
6	R2	(United Kingdom) Brands Hatch	19 September	#16 IMSA Performance Matmut	#51 Kessel Racing
6	R2	(United Kingdom) Brands Hatch	19 September	(France) Raymond Narac (France) Patrick Pilet	(Italy) Lorenzo Bontempelli (Italy) Stefano Livio
7	R1	(Italy) Autodromo Nazionale Monza	2 October	#9 EdilCris Racing Team	#51 Kessel Racing
7	R1	(Italy) Autodromo Nazionale Monza	2 October	(Italy) Raffaele Giammaria (Italy) Enrico Toccacelo	(Italy) Lorenzo Bontempelli (Italy) Stefano Livio
7	R2	(Italy) Autodromo Nazionale Monza	3 October	#16 IMSA Performance Matmut	#66 Kessel Racing
7	R2	(Italy) Autodromo Nazionale Monza	3 October	(France) Raymond Narac (France) Patrick Pilet	(Italy) Niki Cadei (Italy) Marco Frezza
8	R1	(Spain) Circuit de Catalunya	30 October	#22 Aurora Racing Team	#66 Kessel Racing
8	R1	(Spain) Circuit de Catalunya	30 October	(Portugal) Álvaro Parente (Brazil) Nelson Piquet Jr.	(Italy) Niki Cadei (Italy) Marco Frezza
8	R2	(Spain) Circuit de Catalunya	31 October	#2 Autorlando Sport	#80 Novadriver Racing Team
8	R2	(Spain) Circuit de Catalunya	31 October	(Austria) Richard Lietz (Italy) Gianluca Roda	(Portugal) César Campaniço (Portugal) Joao Pedro Figueiredo

== Championship standings ==
=== Drivers ===
==== Overall ====
Points were awarded to drivers in two different systems. The first system rewarded drivers who finished in the top nine overall regardless of class. Points were awarded on a 12–10–8–6–5–4–3–2–1 basis. The second system related to class placings, with points awarded on a 10–8–6–4–3 basis to the top five in each class. Theoretically, the maximum score per race was 22 points.

Pos	Driver	VAL (Spain)		NÜR (Germany)		IMO (Italy)		SPA (Belgium)		MAG (France)		BRH (United Kingdom)		MNZ (Italy)		CAT (Spain)		Pts
1	(Spain) Álvaro Barba (Germany) Pierre Kaffer	22	22	4	22	22	6	18	0	14	14	8	18	18	0	0	10	198
3	(Austria) Richard Lietz (Italy) Gianluca Roda	14	10	10	18	14	10	14	14	10	22	0	8	7	10	10	22	193
5	(Italy) Raffaele Giammaria (Italy) Enrico Toccacelo	18	0	14	1	18	0	22	8	18	10	14	10	22	18	14	4	191
7	(France) Raymond Narac (France) Patrick Pilet	0	18	22	14	10	0	0	18	22	18	0	22	10	22	2	3	181
9	(United Kingdom) Tim Mullen	0	8	18	0	4	22	10	22	8	0	0	0	2	14	22	2	132
10	(Italy) Marco Frezza	11	0	12	0	9	5	15	4	11	4	0	0	0	15	15	22	123
11	(France) Jean-Philippe Dayraut	8	0	15	13	0	15	12	0	4	14	9	0	11	4	11	0	116
12	(Poland) Michał Broniszewski (Austria) Philipp Peter	10	3	0	10	8	14	6	10			18	3	14	0	18	0	114
14	(Italy) Lorenzo Bontempelli (Italy) Stefano Livio	0	18	0	0	12	12	8	0	10	0	0	14	15	12	4	2	107
16	(Monaco) Stéphane Ortelli	8	0	15	13	0	15			4	14	9	0	11	4	11	0	104
17	(Italy) Massimiliano Wiser	0	0	0	4	3	18	0	0	0	8	22	14	0	6	7	14	96
18	(Canada) Chris Niarchos	0	8	18	0	4	22	10	22	8	0	0	0					92
19	(Portugal) Pedro Couceiro	11	0	12	0	9	5	15	4	11	4	0	0			7	1	79
20	(Spain) Lucas Guerrero	0	0	0	4	3	18	0	0	0	8	22	14	0	6			75
21	(Italy) Gabriele Lancieri	0	10	9	4	6	0	0	6	0	0	0	0	0	7	7	14	63
22	(United Kingdom) Peter Bamford (United Kingdom) Alex Mortimer	0	4	0	0	3	3	5	0	6	11	13	4	4	3	3	0	59
24	(Greece) Dimitris Deverikos (Austria) Thomas Gruber	15	0	3	6	4	8	0	10	0	7	4	0	0	0			57
26	(Italy) Niki Cadei													0	15	15	22	52
27	(Republic of Ireland) Matt Griffin			0	8	0	0	0	4	4	2	16	6	0	0	0	8	48
28	(United Kingdom) Adam Christodoulou													2	14	22	2	40
29	(Italy) Angelo Lancelotti	0	10	9	4	6	0	0	6	0	0							35
30	(United Kingdom) Duncan Cameron											16	6			0	8	30
31	(Italy) Andrea Ceccato (Italy) Alessio Salucci	3	22							0	3							28
33	(South Africa) Jack Gerber	0	2	0	8	0	0	0	4	4	2			0	0	0	8	28
34	(France) Michael Petit (France) Johan-Boris Scheier	0	8	6	10													24
36	(France) Frédéric Makowiecki							12	0	3	0					7	1	23
37	(United States) Jim Matthews (Germany) Marcel Tiemann	5	14	0	3	0	0											22
39	(Portugal) Manuel Gião (Argentina) Juan Manuel López	7	14															21
41	(Andorra) Manel Cerqueda (Andorra) Sintu Vives													0	0	0	18	18
43	(Germany) Christopher Bruck							0	0							0	18	18
44	(Germany) Sascha Bert															0	18	18
45	(United Kingdom) Steve Quick (United Kingdom) Martin Short											0	3			0	14	17
47	(Germany) Sebastian Asch (United Kingdom) David Ashburn											6	8					14
49	(Italy) Stefano Borghi (Italy) Gianluca de Lorenzi							0	13									13
51	(Italy) Matteo Giordano											0	0	0	0	0	10	10
52	(Italy) Andrea Wiser															0	10	10
53	(Germany) Freddy Kremer	0	0	0	0	0	0	0	0	0	0			6	0	0	3	9
54	(Belarus) Alexander Talkanitsa Jr. (Belarus) Alexander Talkanitsa Sr.	0	0	0	0	0	0	0	1	1	0	3	2	0	2	0	0	9
56	(Italy) Max Busnelli											0	0	0	7			7
57	(Switzerland) Brian Lavio			0	0	0	0			0	0			6	0			6
58	(France) Jean-Luc Beaubelique	0	3			0	0	0	0					3	0	0	0	6
59	(France) Maurice Ricci (France) Mike Savary	0	0			0	0	0	0							0	4	4
61	(Portugal) Miguel Amaral (Spain) Miguel Ángel de Castro	0	4			0	0									0	0	4
63	(France) Gabriel Balthazard	0	3			0	0	0	0							0	0	3
64	(Italy) Beniamino Caccia							0	0							0	3	3
65	(France) Bruce Lorgère-Roux (France) Julien Rodrigues							3	0									3
67	(Germany) "Mark Bullitt" (Germany) Marc Lieb							0	3									3
69	(France) Jean-Yves Adam									3	0							3
70	(France) Christian Moullin Traffort													3	0			3
71	(Netherlands) Siebrand Dijkstra (Netherlands) Arjan van der Zwaan	0	2	0	0	0	0	0	0									2
73	(Portugal) Rui Águas	0	2					0	0									2
74	(Netherlands) Klaas Hummel	0	0	0	0	0	0	0	0	0	0	0	1	0	0	0	0	1
75	(United Kingdom) Chris Goodwin	0	0	0	0	0	0					0	1	0	0	0	0	1
76	(Italy) Alessandro Garofano							0	0					1	0	0	0	1
77	(Italy) Luca Rangoni													1	0	0	0	1
78	(France) Jean-Marc Bachelie (France) Yannick Malegol							0	0							0	1	1
Pos	Driver	VAL (Spain)		NÜR (Germany)		IMO (Italy)		SPA (Belgium)		MAG (France)		BRH (United Kingdom)		MNZ (Italy)		CAT (Spain)		Pts

==== Super GT ====
Points were awarded to the top five finishers on a 10–8–6–4–3 basis.

Pos	Driver	VAL (Spain)		NÜR (Germany)		IMO (Italy)		SPA (Belgium)		MAG (France)		BRH (United Kingdom)		MNZ (Italy)		CAT (Spain)		Pts
1	(Spain) Álvaro Barba (Germany) Pierre Kaffer	1	1	5	1	1	5	2	Ret	3	3	4	2	2	9	Ret	4	90
3	(Austria) Richard Lietz (Italy) Gianluca Roda	3	4	4	2	3	4	3	3	4	1	Ret	5	5	4	4	1	82
5	(Italy) Raffaele Giammaria (Italy) Enrico Toccacelo	2	9	3	7	2	Ret	1	5	2	4	3	4	1	2	3	6	81
7	(France) Raymond Narac (France) Patrick Pilet	Ret	2	1	3	4	7	6	2	1	2	Ret	1	4	1	6	7	78
9	(United Kingdom) Tim Mullen	Ret	5	2	DSQ	6	1	4	1	5	Ret	Ret	Ret	6	3	1	8	54
10	(Poland) Michał Broniszewski (Austria) Philipp Peter	4	7	7	4	5	3	5	4			2	6	3	Ret	2	14	46
12	(Italy) Massimiliano Wiser	10	Ret	12	6	7	2	DNS	9	10	5	1	3	8	5	5	3	39
13	(Canada) Chris Niarchos	Ret	5	2	DSQ	6	1	4	1	5	Ret	Ret	Ret					38
14	(Spain) Lucas Guerrero	10	Ret	12	6	7	2	DNS	9	10	5	1	3	8	5			30
15	(United Kingdom) Adam Christodoulou													6	3	1	8	16
16	(Portugal) Manuel Gião (Argentina) Juan Manuel López	5	3															9
18	(Italy) Gabriele Lancieri															5	3	9
19	(Andorra) Manel Cerqueda (Andorra) Sintu Vives													10	7	9	2	8
21	(South Africa) Jack Gerber	Ret	8	6	5	12	Ret	8	6	6	6			Ret	8	11	5	6
22	(Republic of Ireland) Matt Griffin			6	5	12	Ret	8	6	6	6			Ret	8	11	5	6
23	(Belarus) Alexander Talkanitsa Jr. (Belarus) Alexander Talkanitsa Sr.	7	11	8	10	10	10	7	7	7	7	5	7	9	6	8	Ret	3
	(Netherlands) Klaas Hummel	6	13	9	8	11	9	Ret	Ret	8	8	Ret	8	Ret	Ret	7	15	0
	(United Kingdom) Chris Goodwin	6	13	9	8	11	9					Ret	8	Ret	Ret	7	15	0
	(Germany) Wolfgang Kaufmann (Italy) Luca Moro	8	12	10	9	8	6	Ret	10									0
	(Portugal) Miguel Amaral	9	6			13	Ret									Ret	11	0
	(Italy) Alessandro Garofano							Ret	Ret					7	Ret	15	12	0
	(Italy) Luca Rangoni													7	Ret	15	12	0
	(United Kingdom) Andrew Kirkaldy							Ret	Ret	8	8							0
	(Netherlands) Peter Versluis	Ret	10	11	Ret	9	8	9	DSQ									0
	(France) Jean-Marc Bachelier (France) Yannick Malegol							10	8							13	9	0
	(Portugal) Rui Águas	Ret	8					Ret	Ret									0
	(Spain) Jordi Gené (Spain) Fernando Monje									9	9			Ret	10	10	10	0
	(Belgium) Amand Fumal							9	DSQ									0
	(Netherlands) Rob van der Zwaan			11	Ret													0
	(France) Gabriel Balthazard (France) Jean-Luc Beaubelique															12	DNS	0
	(United States) Robert Kauffmann															14	13	0
Pos	Driver	VAL (Spain)		NÜR (Germany)		IMO (Italy)		SPA (Belgium)		MAG (France)		BRH (United Kingdom)		MNZ (Italy)		CAT (Spain)		Pts

Colour	Result
Gold	Winner
Silver	Second place
Bronze	Third place
Green	Points classification
Blue	Non-points classification
Blue	Non-classified finish (NC)
Purple	Retired, not classified (Ret)
Red	Did not qualify (DNQ)
Red	Did not pre-qualify (DNPQ)
Black	Disqualified (DSQ)
White	Did not start (DNS)
White	Withdrew (WD)
White	Race cancelled (C)
Blank	Did not practice (DNP)
Blank	Did not arrive (DNA)
Blank	Excluded (EX)

==== GTS ====
Points were awarded to the top five finishers on a 10–8–6–4–3 basis.

Pos	Driver	VAL (Spain)		NÜR (Germany)		IMO (Italy)		SPA (Belgium)		MAG (France)		BRH (United Kingdom)		MNZ (Italy)		CAT (Spain)		Pts
1	(Italy) Marco Frezza	2	12	2	Ret	2	4	1	4	1	4	Ret	Ret	8	1	1	1	86
2	(France) Jean-Philippe Dayraut	3	10	1	1	Ret	1	2	8	4	1	3	Ret	2	4	2	Ret	84
3	(Italy) Lorenzo Bontempelli (Italy) Stefano Livio	8	2	10	10	1	2	3	16	2	9	6	1	1	2	4	8	72
5	(Monaco) Stéphane Ortelli	3	10	1	1					4	1	3	Ret	2	4	2	Ret	66
6	(Portugal) Pedro Couceiro	2	12	2	Ret	2	4	1	4	1	4	Ret	Ret			3	9	62
7	(Greece) Dimitris Deverikos (Austria) Thomas Gruber	1	13	5	3	4	3	9	2	Ret	3	5	Ret	6	6			46
9	(United Kingdom) Peter Bamford (United Kingdom) Alex Mortimer	Ret	6	Ret	6	5	5	4	9	3	2	2	4	4	5	5	DNS	46
11	(Italy) Gabriele Lancieri	7	4	3	4	3	10	6	3	Ret	Ret	Ret	DNS	9	3			32
12	(Italy) Niki Cadei													8	1	1	1	30
13	(Italy) Angelo Lancelotti	7	4	3	4	3	10	6	3	Ret	Ret							26
14	(France) Johan-Boris Scheier	6	5	4	2	Ret	1											25
15	(United Kingdom) Duncan Cameron											1	3			7	5	19
16	(France) Frédéric Makowiecki							2	8	5	7					3	9	17
17	(Republic of Ireland) Matt Griffin											1	3					16
18	(Italy) Andrea Ceccato (Italy) Alessio Salucci	5	1							6	5							16
20	(France) Michael Petit	6	5	4	2													15
21	(United States) Jim Matthews (Germany) Marcel Tiemann	4	3	6	5	7	Ret											13
23	(Germany) Sebastian Asch (United Kingdom) David Ashburn											4	2					12
25	(Italy) Stefano Borghi (Italy) Gianluca de Lorenzi							10	1									10
27	(United Kingdom) Steve Quick (United Kingdom) Martin Short											8	5			9	3	9
29	(Germany) Christopher Bruck							13	10							Ret	2	8
30	(Germany) Sascha Bert															Ret	2	8
31	(Germany) Freddy Kremer	12	Ret	7	7	8	6	12	11	7	Ret			3	8	Ret	7	6
32	(Switzerland) Brian Lavio			7	7	8	6			7	Ret			3	8			6
33	(Italy) Max Busnelli									9	6	Ret	DNS	9	3			6
34	(Italy) Matteo Giordano											DNS	Ret	7	7	8	4	4
35	(Italy) Andrea Wiser															8	4	4
36	(France) Bruce Lorgère-Roux (France) Julien Rodrigues							5	6									3
38	(France) Jean-Luc Beaubelique	10	7			Ret	8	Ret	12					5	9			3
39	(France) Jean-Yves Adam									5	7							3
40	(France) Christian Moullin Traffort													5	9			3
41	(Germany) "Mark Bullitt" (Germany) Marc Lieb							Ret	5									3
	(France) Maurice Ricci (France) Mike Savary	11	9			6	9	11	14							6	6	0
	(Italy) Gianandrea Crespi			Ret	9	Ret	7	16	13	9	6	DNS	Ret	7	7			0
	(United Kingdom) Aaron Scott (United Kingdom) Craig Wilkins											7	6					0
	(Netherlands) Siebrand Dijkstra (Netherlands) Arjan van der Zwaan	9	8	8	Ret	Ret	Ret	7	7									0
	(France) Gabriel Balthazard	10	7			Ret	8	Ret	12									0
	(Italy) Beniamino Caccia							12	11							Ret	7	0
	(Italy) Giovanni Sada					Ret	7											0
	(France) Daniel Desbruères	13	11	9	8			14	17	8	8							0
	(France) Jean-Marc Bachelier									8	8							0
	(Belgium) Christian Kelders	13	11	9	8			14	17									0
	(France) Jérôme Demay (France) Benjamin Rouget							8	15									0
	(Italy) Enrico Crespi			Ret	9													0
	(Germany) Dirk Riebensahm							13	10									0
	(France) Nicolas Armengol (France) Fabio Spirgi															10	Ret	0
	(Switzerland) Ronnie Kessel	12	Ret															0
	(Portugal) António Coimbra (Portugal) Luís Silva							15	Ret									0
Pos	Driver	VAL (Spain)		NÜR (Germany)		IMO (Italy)		SPA (Belgium)		MAG (France)		BRH (United Kingdom)		MNZ (Italy)		CAT (Spain)		Pts

Colour	Result
Gold	Winner
Silver	Second place
Bronze	Third place
Green	Points classification
Blue	Non-points classification
Blue	Non-classified finish (NC)
Purple	Retired, not classified (Ret)
Red	Did not qualify (DNQ)
Red	Did not pre-qualify (DNPQ)
Black	Disqualified (DSQ)
White	Did not start (DNS)
White	Withdrew (WD)
White	Race cancelled (C)
Blank	Did not practice (DNP)
Blank	Did not arrive (DNA)
Blank	Excluded (EX)

=== Teams ===
==== Super GT ====
Points were awarded to the top five finishers on a 10–8–6–4–3 basis.

Pos	Team	VAL (Spain)		NÜR (Germany)		IMO (Italy)		SPA (Belgium)		MAG (France)		BRH (United Kingdom)		MNZ (Italy)		CAT (Spain)		Pts
1	(Italy) AF Corse	1	1	5	1	1	5	2	6	3	3	4	2	2	8	11	4	96
1	(Italy) AF Corse	Ret	8	6	5	12	Ret	8	8	6	6			7	9	13	5	96
2	(Italy) Autorlando Sport	3	4	4	2	3	4	3	3	4	1	Ret	5	5	4	4	1	82
2	(Italy) Autorlando Sport	8	12	10	9	8	6	Ret	10									82
3	(Italy) Racing Team EdilCris	2	9	3	7	2	Ret	1	5	2	4	3	4	1	2	3	6	81
4	(France) IMSA Performance Matmut	Ret	2	1	3	4	7	6	2	1	2	Ret	1	4	1	6	7	78
5	(United Kingdom) CRS Racing	6	5	2	8	6	1	4	1	5	8	Ret	8	6	3	1	8	54
5	(United Kingdom) CRS Racing	Ret	13	9	DSQ	11	9	Ret	Ret	8	Ret	Ret	Ret	Ret	Ret	7	15	54
6	(Switzerland) Kessel Racing	4	7	7	4	5	3	5	4			2	6	3	Ret	2	14	46
7	(Italy) Villois Racing	10	Ret	12	6	7	2	DNS	9	10	5	1	3	8	5	5	3	39
8	(Portugal) Aurora Racing Team	5	3															9
9	Automóbil Club d'Andorra													10	7	9	2	8
10	(Austria) AT Racing	7	11	8	10	10	10	7	7	7	7	5	7	9	6	8	Ret	3
	(Spain) Drivex	9	6			13	Ret									Ret	11	0
	(Netherlands) Peter Versluis	Ret	10	11	Ret	9	8	9	DSQ									0
	(Spain) Sunred Engineering									9	9			Ret	10	10	10	0
	(France) Gabriel Balthazard															12	DNS	0
Pos	Team	VAL (Spain)		NÜR (Germany)		IMO (Italy)		SPA (Belgium)		MAG (France)		BRH (United Kingdom)		MNZ (Italy)		CAT (Spain)		Pts

Colour	Result
Gold	Winner
Silver	Second place
Bronze	Third place
Green	Points classification
Blue	Non-points classification
Blue	Non-classified finish (NC)
Purple	Retired, not classified (Ret)
Red	Did not qualify (DNQ)
Red	Did not pre-qualify (DNPQ)
Black	Disqualified (DSQ)
White	Did not start (DNS)
White	Withdrew (WD)
White	Race cancelled (C)
Blank	Did not practice (DNP)
Blank	Did not arrive (DNA)
Blank	Excluded (EX)

==== GTS ====
Points were awarded to the top five finishers on a 10–8–6–4–3 basis.

Pos	Team	VAL (Spain)		NÜR (Germany)		IMO (Italy)		SPA (Belgium)		MAG (France)		BRH (United Kingdom)		MNZ (Italy)		CAT (Spain)		Pts
1	(Switzerland) Kessel Racing	2	1	2	7	1	2	1	4	1	4	6	1	1	1	1	1	180
1	(Switzerland) Kessel Racing	5	2	7	10	2	4	3	11	2	5	Ret	Ret	3	2	4	7	180
2	(France) Luxury Racing (Dayraut)	3	10	1	1	Ret	1	2	8	4	1	3	Ret	2	4	2	Ret	87
2	(France) Luxury Racing (Dayraut)									5	7							87
3	(Italy) Autorlando Sport	1	13	5	3	4	3	9	2	Ret	3	5	Ret	6	6			46
4	(United Kingdom) Team RPM	Ret	6	Ret	6	5	5	4	9	3	2	2	4	4	5	5	DNS	46
5	(Italy) Villois Racing	7	4	3	4	3	7	6	3	9	6	Ret	Ret	7	3	8	4	36
5	(Italy) Villois Racing			Ret	9	Ret	10	16	13	Ret	Ret	DNS	DNS	9	7			36
6	(United Kingdom) MTech											1	3			7	5	19
7	(France) Luxury Racing (Petit)	6	5	4	2													15
8	(Germany) Phoenix Racing	4	3	6	5	7	Ret											13
9	(United Kingdom) Trackspeed											4	2					12
10	(Italy) De Lorenzi Racing							10	1									10
11	(United Kingdom) Rollcentre Racing											8	5			9	3	9
12	(Germany) Vulkan Racing							13	10							Ret	2	8
13	(France) Luxury Racing (Makowiecki)															3	9	6
14	(France) Luxury Racing (Lorgère-Roux)							5	6									3
15	(France) PRO-GT by Alméras													5	9			3
16	(Germany) Manthey Racing							Ret	5									3
	(France) Sofrev-ASP	10	7			6	8	11	12							6	6	0
	(France) Sofrev-ASP	11	9			Ret	9	Ret	14									0
	(United Kingdom) Craig Wilkins											7	6					0
	(Netherlands) Brinkmann Motorsport	9	8	8	Ret	Ret	Ret	7	7									0
	(France) Protonic Racing	13	11	9	8			14	17	8	8							0
	(France) Luxury Racing (Demay)							8	15									0
	(France) Nicolas Armengol															10	Ret	0
	(Portugal) Vodafone Team							15	Ret									0
Pos	Team	VAL (Spain)		NÜR (Germany)		IMO (Italy)		SPA (Belgium)		MAG (France)		BRH (United Kingdom)		MNZ (Italy)		CAT (Spain)		Pts

Colour	Result
Gold	Winner
Silver	Second place
Bronze	Third place
Green	Points classification
Blue	Non-points classification
Blue	Non-classified finish (NC)
Purple	Retired, not classified (Ret)
Red	Did not qualify (DNQ)
Red	Did not pre-qualify (DNPQ)
Black	Disqualified (DSQ)
White	Did not start (DNS)
White	Withdrew (WD)
White	Race cancelled (C)
Blank	Did not practice (DNP)
Blank	Did not arrive (DNA)
Blank	Excluded (EX)
