= Andrea Rizzoli (racing driver) =

Italian racing driver (born 1985)

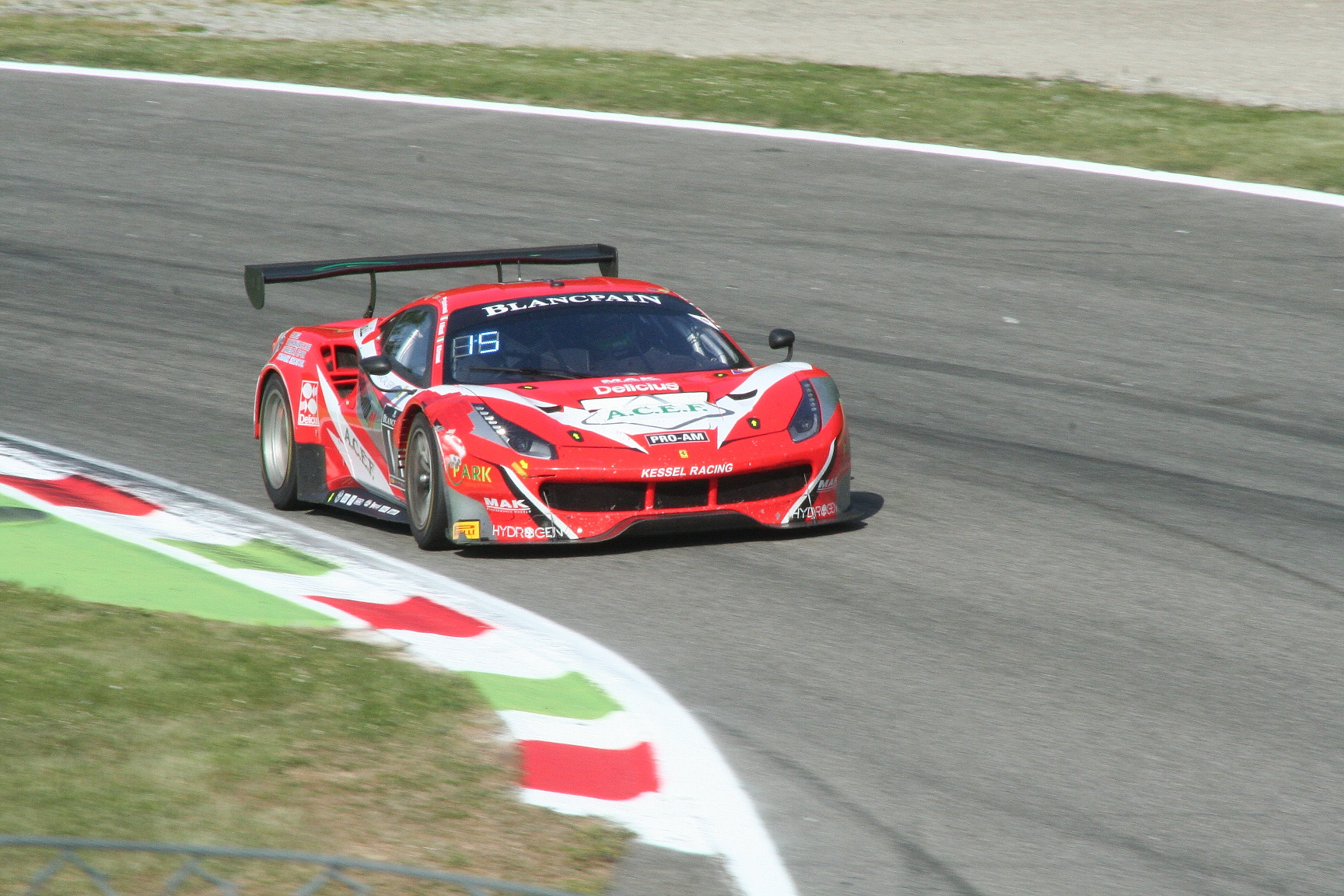
- Rizzoli in 2017
- Nationality: (Italy) Italian
- Born: 12 October 1985 (age 41) Parma, Italy
- Categorisation: FIA Silver

Championship titles
- 2015 2014, 2016 2010: European Le Mans Series - LMGTE; Blancpain Endurance Series - Pro-Am Cup; Ferrari Challenge Italy - Coppa Shell

Andrea Rizzoli (born 12 October 1985) is an Italian racing driver who last competed in the GT World Challenge Europe Endurance Cup for Dinamic Motorsport. He was champion of the LMGTE class in the 2015 European Le Mans Series and a two-time champion of the Blancpain Endurance Series Pro-Am Cup in 2014 and 2016.

== Racing record ==
=== Career summary ===
Season	Series	Team	Races	Wins	Poles	F/Laps	Podiums	Points	Position
2008	Ferrari Challenge Italy - Coppa Shell	Motor/Piacenza	?	?	?	?	?	16	27th
2010	Ferrari Challenge Italy - Coppa Shell		?	?	?	?	?	145	**1st**
2011	International GT Open	AF Corse	14	0	0	1	1	103	20th
2011	International GT Open - Pro-Am Cup	AF Corse	14	3	0	1	8	72	6th
2012	International GT Open	AF Corse	14	0	0	0	0	81	12th
2012	International GT Open - Pro-Am Cup	AF Corse	14	3	0	0	6	67	4th
2013	European Le Mans Series - GTC	AF Corse	5	0	1	0	4	76	**2nd**
2014	Blancpain GT Series	Scuderia Villorba Corse	5	0	0	0	0	15	33rd
2014	Blancpain Endurance Series - Pro-Am Cup	Scuderia Villorba Corse	5	0	0	0	3	96	**1st**
2014	European Le Mans Series - GTC	AF Corse	1	0	0	0	0	8	23rd
2014	Gulf 12 Hours - GT3	AF Corse	1	0	0	0	0	N/A	7th
2015	European Le Mans Series - LMGTE	Formula Racing	5	2	0	0	3	83	**1st**
2016	Blancpain GT Series Endurance Cup - Pro-Am Cup	Kessel Racing	5	2	0	0	3	102	**1st**
2016	Gulf 12 Hours - Pro-Am	AF Corse	1	1	1	0	1	N/A	**1st**
2017	Blancpain GT Series	Kessel Racing	4	0	0	0	0	6	63rd
2017	Blancpain GT Series Endurance Cup - Pro-Am Cup	Kessel Racing	4	0	0	0	1	30	17th
2017	Intercontinental GT Challenge	Kessel Racing	1	0	0	0	0	0	NC
2018	Blancpain GT Series	Ombra Racing	5	0	0	0	0	0	NC
2018	Blancpain GT Series Endurance Cup - Silver Cup	Ombra Racing	5	1	1	0	2	71	4th
2018	International GT Open - GT3 Pro	Ombra Racing	2	1	0	0	1	0	49th
2019	Blancpain GT Series	Dinamic Motorsport	5	1	0	0	1	31	22nd
2019	Blancpain GT Series Endurance Cup - Pro Cup	Dinamic Motorsport	5	1	0	0	1	31	8th
2019	Intercontinental GT Challenge	Dinamic Motorsport	1	0	0	0	0	0	NC
2020	GT World Challenge Europe	Dinamic Motorsport	4	0	0	0	0	0	NC
2020	GT World Challenge Europe Endurance Cup - Silver Cup	Dinamic Motorsport	4	0	0	0	1	30	13th
2020	Intercontinental GT Challenge	Dinamic Motorsport	1	0	0	0	0	0	NC
2021	GT World Challenge Europe	Dinamic Motorsport	5	0	0	0	0	1	65th
2021	GT World Challenge Europe Endurance Cup - Pro Cup	Dinamic Motorsport	5	0	0	0	0	1	32nd
2021	Intercontinental GT Challenge	Dinamic Motorsport	1	0	0	0	0	0	NC

^{†} As Rizzoli was a guest driver, he was ineligible for championship points.

=== Complete European Le Mans Series results ===
Year	Entrant	Class	Chassis	Engine	1	2	3	4	5	Rank	Points
2013	AF Corse	GTC	Ferrari 458 Italia GT3	Ferrari F136 4.5 L V8	SIL; 2	IMO; 2	RBR; 2	**HUN**; 3	LEC; 7	2nd	76
2014	AF Corse	GTC	Ferrari 458 Italia GT3	Ferrari F136 4.5 L V8	SIL	IMO	RBR	LEC; 6	EST	23rd	8
2015	Formula Racing	LMGTE	Ferrari 458 Italia GT2	Ferrari F136 4.5 L V8	SIL; 6	IMO; 3	RBR; 1	LEC; 1	EST; 5	1st	83

=== Complete GT World Challenge Europe results ===
==== GT World Challenge Europe Endurance Cup ====
(key) (Races in bold indicate pole position) (Races in italics indicate fastest lap)

Year	Team	Car	Class	1	2	3	4	5	6	7	Pos.	Points
2014	Scuderia Villorba Corse	Ferrari 458 Italia GT3	Pro-Am	MNZ; 2	SIL; 5	LEC; 2	SPA; 6H; 2	SPA; 12H; 1	SPA; 24H; 5	NÜR; 3	1st	96
2016	Kessel Racing	Ferrari 488 GT3	Pro-Am	MNZ; 1	SIL; 8	LEC; 1	SPA; 6H; 5	SPA; 12H; 3	SPA; 24H; 5	NÜR; 2	1st	102
2017	Kessel Racing	Ferrari 488 GT3	Pro-Am	MNZ; 8	SIL; 44	LEC; 32	SPA; 6H; 22	SPA; 12H; 17	SPA; 24H; Ret	CAT	36th	4
2018	Ombra Racing	Lamborghini Huracán GT3	Silver	MNZ; 8	SIL; Ret	LEC; Ret	SPA; 6H; 1	SPA; 12H; 2	SPA; 24H; 1	**CAT**; 2	4th	71
2019	Dinamic Motorsport	Porsche 911 GT3 R	Pro	MNZ; 1	SIL; 18	LEC; 37	SPA; 6H; 18	SPA; 12H; 4	SPA; 24H; 27	CAT; Ret	8th	31
2020	Dinamic Motorsport	Porsche 911 GT3 R	Silver	IMO; 3	NÜR; 7	SPA; 6H; 10	SPA; 12H; 11	SPA] 24H; Ret	LEC; 6		13th	30
2021	Dinamic Motorsport	Porsche 911 GT3 R	Pro	MON; 10	LEC; 11	SPA; 6H; 43	SPA; 12H; 53	SPA; 24H; Ret	NÜR; Ret	CAT; 19	32nd	1

=== Complete Intercontinental GT Challenge results ===
Year	Manufacturer	Car	1	2	3	4	5	Pos.	Points
2017	Ferrari	Ferrari 488 GT3	BAT	SPA; Ret	LAG			NC	0
2019	Porsche	Porsche 911 GT3 R	BAT	LAG	SPA; 27	SUZ	KYA	NC	0
2020	Porsche	Porsche 911 GT3 R	BAT	IND	SPA; Ret	KYA		NC	0
2021	Porsche	Porsche 911 GT3 R	SPA; Ret	IND	KYA			NC	0
