= Luca Persiani =

Italian racing driver (1984–2024)

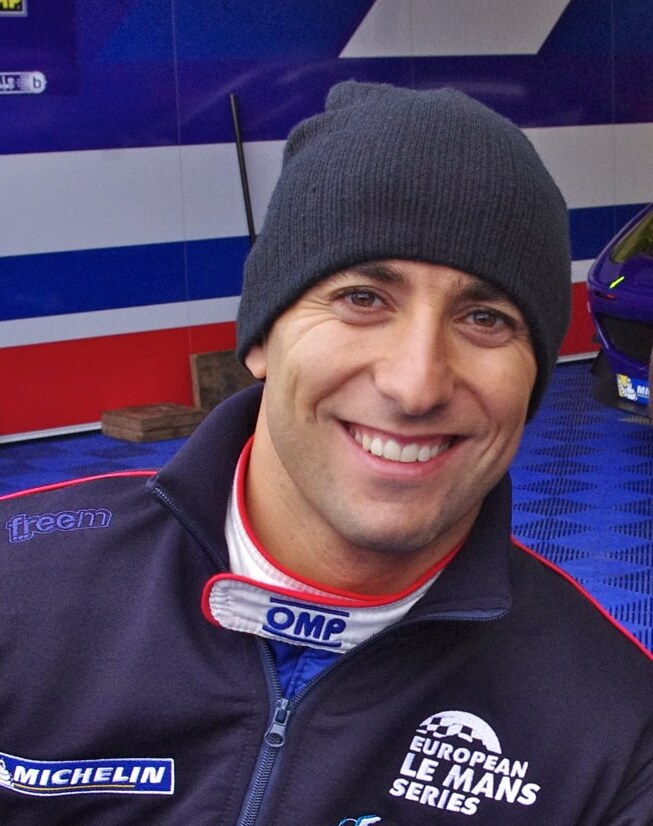
- Persiani in 2014
- Nationality: (Italy) Italian
- Born: 11 April 1984 Albano Laziale, Italy
- Died: 19 August 2024 (aged 40) Frattura, Italy

European Le Mans Series career
- Debut season: 2013
- Current team: SMP Racing
- Categorisation: FIA Silver (2013–2014, 2016–2024); FIA Gold (2015)
- Car number: 71
- Wins: 1
- Poles: 4
- Best finish: 3rd (GTC) in 2014

Luca Persiani (11 April 1984 – 19 August 2024) was an Italian auto racing driver.

Having started his career off in Eurocup Formula Renault 2.0 and International Formula Master, he made his GT racing debut in 2013 after a five-year hiatus and became a race winner in the European Le Mans Series for SMP Racing. He later progressed to a coaching role, working with Prema Racing, Iron Lynx and Ferrari while also competing part-time in Lamborghini Super Trofeo in North America, where he managed Las Vegas Motor Speedway's Dream Racing program.

Persiani died on 19 August 2024 when the 4x4 Jeep he was driving fell down a ravine near Frattura, Italy. He was 40.

== Racing record ==
=== Complete Eurocup Formula Renault 2.0 results ===
(key) (Races in bold indicate pole position; races in italics indicate fastest lap)

| Year | Entrant | 1 | 2 | 3 | 4 | 5 | 6 | 7 | 8 | 9 | 10 | 11 | 12 | 13 | 14 | 15 | 16 | DC | Points |
|---|---|---|---|---|---|---|---|---|---|---|---|---|---|---|---|---|---|---|---|
| 2005 | JD Motorsport | ZOL; 1 | ZOL; 2 | VAL; 1 | VAL; 2 | LMS; 1 | LMS; 2 | BIL; 1 | BIL; 2 | OSC; 1 | OSC; 2 | DON; 1 | DON; 2 | EST; 1 | EST; 2 | MNZ; 1 Ret | MNZ; 2; 6 | NC† | 0 |

† As Persiani was a guest driver, he was ineligible for points.

=== Complete European Le Mans Series results ===
(key) (Races in bold indicate pole position; results in italics indicate fastest lap)

| Year | Entrant | Class | Chassis | Engine | 1 | 2 | 3 | 4 | 5 | Rank | Points |
|---|---|---|---|---|---|---|---|---|---|---|---|
| 2013 | SMP Racing | GTC | Ferrari 458 Italia GT3 | Ferrari F136 4.5 L V8 | SIL | IMO | **RBR**; 5 | HUN; 2 | LEC; 2 | 5th | 47 |
| 2014 | SMP Racing | GTC | Ferrari 458 Italia GT3 | Ferrari F136 4.5 L V8 | **SIL**; DNS | IMO; 3 | RBR; 1 | **LEC**; 4 | **EST**; 4 | 3rd | 67 |
