= 2013 3 Hours of Le Castellet =

Layout of Circuit Paul Ricard

The 2013 3 Hours of Le Castellet was an auto racing event held at Circuit Paul Ricard in Le Castellet, France on 27–28 September 2013. It was the fifth and final round of the 2013 European Le Mans Series season.

== Race ==
=== Race result ===
Class winners in bold. Cars failing to complete 70% of winner's distance marked as Not Classified (NC).

Pos	Class	No	Team	Drivers	Chassis	Tyre	Laps
Pos	Class	No	Team	Drivers	Engine	Tyre	Laps
1	**LMP2**	**18**	**(Republic of Ireland) Murphy Prototypes**	**(New Zealand) Brendon Hartley** **(Switzerland) Jonathan Hirschi**	**Oreca 03**	D	**93**
1	**LMP2**	**18**	**(Republic of Ireland) Murphy Prototypes**	**(New Zealand) Brendon Hartley** **(Switzerland) Jonathan Hirschi**	**Nissan VK45DE 4.5 L V8**	D	**93**
2	LMP2	43	(Switzerland) Morand Racing	(Switzerland) Natacha Gachnang (Austria) Christian Klien	Morgan LMP2	D	93
2	LMP2	43	(Switzerland) Morand Racing	(Switzerland) Natacha Gachnang (Austria) Christian Klien	Judd HK 3.6 L V8	D	93
3	LMP2	38	(United Kingdom) Jota Sport	(United Kingdom) Simon Dolan (United Kingdom) Oliver Turvey	Zytek Z11SN	D	93
3	LMP2	38	(United Kingdom) Jota Sport	(United Kingdom) Simon Dolan (United Kingdom) Oliver Turvey	Nissan VK45DE 4.5 L V8	D	93
4	LMP2	36	(France) Signatech Alpine	(France) Pierre Ragues (France) Nelson Panciatici	Alpine A450	MI	93
4	LMP2	36	(France) Signatech Alpine	(France) Pierre Ragues (France) Nelson Panciatici	Nissan VK45DE 4.5 L V8	MI	93
5	LMP2	4	(Belgium) Boutsen Ginion Racing	(United Kingdom) John Hartshorne (Belgium) Renaud Kuppens (United Kingdom) James Swift	Oreca 03	D	93
5	LMP2	4	(Belgium) Boutsen Ginion Racing	(United Kingdom) John Hartshorne (Belgium) Renaud Kuppens (United Kingdom) James Swift	Nissan VK45DE 4.5 L V8	D	93
6	LMP2	37	(Russia) SMP Racing	(Russia) Sergey Zlobin (Italy) Maurizio Mediani	Oreca 03	D	92
6	LMP2	37	(Russia) SMP Racing	(Russia) Sergey Zlobin (Italy) Maurizio Mediani	Nissan VK45DE 4.5 L V8	D	92
7	LMP2	34	(Switzerland) Race Performance	(Switzerland) Michel Frey (Switzerland) Marcello Marateotto	Oreca 03	D	91
7	LMP2	34	(Switzerland) Race Performance	(Switzerland) Michel Frey (Switzerland) Marcello Marateotto	Judd HK 3.6 L V8	D	91
8	**LMPC**	**48**	**(France) Team Endurance Challenge**	**(France) Soheil Ayari** **(France) Anthony Pons**	**Oreca FLM09**	MI	**90**
8	**LMPC**	**48**	**(France) Team Endurance Challenge**	**(France) Soheil Ayari** **(France) Anthony Pons**	**Chevrolet LS3 6.2 L V8**	MI	**90**
9	**LMGTE**	**52**	**(United Kingdom) Ram Racing**	**(United Kingdom) Johnny Mowlem** **(Republic of Ireland) Matt Griffin**	**Ferrari 458 Italia GT2**	MI	**90**
9	**LMGTE**	**52**	**(United Kingdom) Ram Racing**	**(United Kingdom) Johnny Mowlem** **(Republic of Ireland) Matt Griffin**	**Ferrari F136 4.5 L V8**	MI	**90**
10	LMGTE	66	(United Kingdom) JMW Motorsport	(Italy) Andrea Bertolini (Switzerland) Joël Camathias	Ferrari 458 Italia GT2	D	89
10	LMGTE	66	(United Kingdom) JMW Motorsport	(Italy) Andrea Bertolini (Switzerland) Joël Camathias	Ferrari F136 4.5 L V8	D	89
11	LMGTE	77	(Germany) Proton Competition	(Germany) Christian Ried (Austria) Klaus Bachler (United Kingdom) Nick Tandy	Porsche 997 GT3-RSR	MI	89
11	LMGTE	77	(Germany) Proton Competition	(Germany) Christian Ried (Austria) Klaus Bachler (United Kingdom) Nick Tandy	Porsche M97/74 4.0 L Flat-6	MI	89
12	LMGTE	55	(Italy) AF Corse	(Italy) Piergiuseppe Perazzini (Italy) Marco Cioci (Italy) Federico Leo	Ferrari 458 Italia GT2	MI	89
12	LMGTE	55	(Italy) AF Corse	(Italy) Piergiuseppe Perazzini (Italy) Marco Cioci (Italy) Federico Leo	Ferrari F136 4.5 L V8	MI	89
13	LMGTE	53	(United Kingdom) Ram Racing	(United States) Gunnar Jeannette (United States) Frankie Montecalvo	Ferrari 458 Italia GT2	MI	88
13	LMGTE	53	(United Kingdom) Ram Racing	(United States) Gunnar Jeannette (United States) Frankie Montecalvo	Ferrari F136 4.5 L V8	MI	88
14	**GTC**	**69**	**(Russia) SMP Racing**	**(Italy) Fabio Babini** **(Russia) Viktor Shaytar** **(Russia) Kirill Ladygin**	**Ferrari 458 Italia GT3**	MI	**88**
14	**GTC**	**69**	**(Russia) SMP Racing**	**(Italy) Fabio Babini** **(Russia) Viktor Shaytar** **(Russia) Kirill Ladygin**	**Ferrari F136 4.5 L V8**	MI	**88**
15	GTC	72	(Russia) SMP Racing	(Russia) Devi Markozov (Russia) Alexander Frolov (Italy) Luca Persiani	Ferrari 458 Italia GT3	MI	87
15	GTC	72	(Russia) SMP Racing	(Russia) Devi Markozov (Russia) Alexander Frolov (Italy) Luca Persiani	Ferrari F136 4.5 L V8	MI	87
16	LMGTE	75	(Belgium) Prospeed Competition	(France) François Perrodo (France) Emmanuel Collard	Porsche 997 GT3-RSR	MI	87
16	LMGTE	75	(Belgium) Prospeed Competition	(France) François Perrodo (France) Emmanuel Collard	Porsche M97/74 4.0 L Flat-6	MI	87
17	LMGTE	67	(France) IMSA Performance Matmut	(France) Patrice Milesi (France) Jean-Karl Vernay	Porsche 997 GT3-RSR	MI	87
17	LMGTE	67	(France) IMSA Performance Matmut	(France) Patrice Milesi (France) Jean-Karl Vernay	Porsche M97/74 4.0 L Flat-6	MI	87
18	GTC	86	(Italy) Scuderia Villorba Corse	(France) Steeve Hiesse (France) Cédric Mézard	Ferrari 458 Italia GT3	MI	87
18	GTC	86	(Italy) Scuderia Villorba Corse	(France) Steeve Hiesse (France) Cédric Mézard	Ferrari F136 4.5 L V8	MI	87
19	GTC	79	(United Kingdom) Ecurie Ecosse	(United Kingdom) Andrew Smith (United Kingdom) Ollie Millroy (United Kingdom) Phil Quaife	BMW Z4 GT3	MI	86
19	GTC	79	(United Kingdom) Ecurie Ecosse	(United Kingdom) Andrew Smith (United Kingdom) Ollie Millroy (United Kingdom) Phil Quaife	BMW P65B44 4.4 L V8	MI	86
20	LMGTE	54	(Italy) AF Corse	(France) Yannick Mollégol (France) Jean-Marc Bachelier (United States) Howard Blank	Ferrari 458 Italia GT2	MI	86
20	LMGTE	54	(Italy) AF Corse	(France) Yannick Mollégol (France) Jean-Marc Bachelier (United States) Howard Blank	Ferrari F136 4.5 L V8	MI	86
21	LMPC	49	(France) Team Endurance Challenge	(France) Paul-Loup Chatin (Switzerland) Gary Hirsch	Oreca FLM09	MI	86
21	LMPC	49	(France) Team Endurance Challenge	(France) Paul-Loup Chatin (Switzerland) Gary Hirsch	Chevrolet LS3 6.2 L V8	MI	86
22	LMP2	1	(France) Thiriet by TDS Racing	(France) Pierre Thiriet (Switzerland) Mathias Beche	Oreca 03	D	86
22	LMP2	1	(France) Thiriet by TDS Racing	(France) Pierre Thiriet (Switzerland) Mathias Beche	Nissan VK45DE 4.5 L V8	D	86
23	GTC	68	(Italy) Scuderia Villorba Corse	(Russia) Anton Ladygin (Russia) Boris Rotenberg (Finland) Mika Salo	Ferrari 458 Italia GT3	MI	85
23	GTC	68	(Italy) Scuderia Villorba Corse	(Russia) Anton Ladygin (Russia) Boris Rotenberg (Finland) Mika Salo	Ferrari F136 4.5 L V8	MI	85
24	GTC	85	(Luxembourg) DKR Engineering	(France) Thomas Accary (France) Dimitri Enjalbert (France) Matthieu Lecuyer	BMW Z4 GT3 (Spec 2011)	MI	85
24	GTC	85	(Luxembourg) DKR Engineering	(France) Thomas Accary (France) Dimitri Enjalbert (France) Matthieu Lecuyer	BMW P65B44 4.4 L V8	MI	85
25	GTC	62	(Italy) AF Corse	(France) Andrea Razzoli (Italy) Stefano Gai (Italy) Lorenzo Casè	Ferrari 458 Italia GT3	MI	82
25	GTC	62	(Italy) AF Corse	(France) Andrea Razzoli (Italy) Stefano Gai (Italy) Lorenzo Casè	Ferrari F136 4.5 L V8	MI	82
DNF	GTC	60	(Netherlands) Kox Racing	(Netherlands) Peter Kox (Netherlands) Nico Pronk (Netherlands) Dennis Retera	Lamborghini Gallardo LP600+ GT3	MI	61
DNF	GTC	60	(Netherlands) Kox Racing	(Netherlands) Peter Kox (Netherlands) Nico Pronk (Netherlands) Dennis Retera	Lamborghini 5.2 L V10	MI	61

European Le Mans Series
Previous race: 3 Hours of Hungaroring	2013 season	Next race: none
