= 2013 3 Hours of Hungaroring =

Layout of the Hungaroring

The 2013 3 Hours of Hungaroring was an auto racing event held at the Hungaroring in Mogyoród, Pest County, Hungary on 13–14 September 2013. It was the fourth round of the 2013 European Le Mans Series season.

== Race ==
=== Race result ===
Class winners in bold. Cars failing to complete 70% of winner's distance marked as Not Classified (NC).

Pos	Class	No	Team	Drivers	Chassis	Tyre	Laps
Pos	Class	No	Team	Drivers	Engine	Tyre	Laps
1	**LMP2**	**36**	**(France) Signatech Alpine**	**(France) Pierre Ragues** **(France) Nelson Panciatici**	**Alpine A450**	MI	**99**
1	**LMP2**	**36**	**(France) Signatech Alpine**	**(France) Pierre Ragues** **(France) Nelson Panciatici**	**Nissan VK45DE 4.5 L V8**	MI	**99**
2	LMP2	18	(Republic of Ireland) Murphy Prototypes	(New Zealand) Brendon Hartley (Switzerland) Jonathan Hirschi	Oreca 03	D	99
2	LMP2	18	(Republic of Ireland) Murphy Prototypes	(New Zealand) Brendon Hartley (Switzerland) Jonathan Hirschi	Nissan VK45DE 4.5 L V8	D	99
3	LMP2	38	(United Kingdom) Jota Sport	(United Kingdom) Simon Dolan (United Kingdom) Oliver Turvey	Zytek Z11SN	D	98
3	LMP2	38	(United Kingdom) Jota Sport	(United Kingdom) Simon Dolan (United Kingdom) Oliver Turvey	Nissan VK45DE 4.5 L V8	D	98
4	LMP2	37	(Russia) SMP Racing	(Russia) Sergey Zlobin (Italy) Maurizio Mediani	Oreca 03	D	96
4	LMP2	37	(Russia) SMP Racing	(Russia) Sergey Zlobin (Italy) Maurizio Mediani	Nissan VK45DE 4.5 L V8	D	96
5	LMP2	43	(Switzerland) Morand Racing	(Switzerland) Natacha Gachnang (Austria) Christian Klien	Morgan LMP2	D	95
5	LMP2	43	(Switzerland) Morand Racing	(Switzerland) Natacha Gachnang (Austria) Christian Klien	Judd HK 3.6 L V8	D	95
6	LMP2	1	(France) Thiriet by TDS Racing	(France) Pierre Thiriet (Switzerland) Mathias Beche	Oreca 03	D	94
6	LMP2	1	(France) Thiriet by TDS Racing	(France) Pierre Thiriet (Switzerland) Mathias Beche	Nissan VK45DE 4.5 L V8	D	94
7	**LMGTE**	**77**	**(Germany) Proton Competition**	**(Germany) Christian Ried** **(Austria) Klaus Bachler** **(United Kingdom) Nick Tandy**	**Porsche 997 GT3-RSR**	MI	**93**
7	**LMGTE**	**77**	**(Germany) Proton Competition**	**(Germany) Christian Ried** **(Austria) Klaus Bachler** **(United Kingdom) Nick Tandy**	**Porsche M97/74 4.0 L Flat-6**	MI	**93**
8	**LMPC**	**49**	**(France) Team Endurance Challenge**	**(France) Paul-Loup Chatin** **(Switzerland) Gary Hirsch**	**Oreca FLM09**	MI	**93**
8	**LMPC**	**49**	**(France) Team Endurance Challenge**	**(France) Paul-Loup Chatin** **(Switzerland) Gary Hirsch**	**Chevrolet LS3 6.2 L V8**	MI	**93**
9	LMGTE	52	(United Kingdom) Ram Racing	(United Kingdom) Johnny Mowlem (Republic of Ireland) Matt Griffin	Ferrari 458 Italia GT2	MI	92
9	LMGTE	52	(United Kingdom) Ram Racing	(United Kingdom) Johnny Mowlem (Republic of Ireland) Matt Griffin	Ferrari F136 4.5 L V8	MI	92
10	LMGTE	55	(Italy) AF Corse	(Italy) Piergiuseppe Perazzini (Italy) Marco Cioci (Italy) Federico Leo	Ferrari 458 Italia GT2	MI	92
10	LMGTE	55	(Italy) AF Corse	(Italy) Piergiuseppe Perazzini (Italy) Marco Cioci (Italy) Federico Leo	Ferrari F136 4.5 L V8	MI	92
11	LMGTE	75	(Belgium) Prospeed Competition	(France) François Perrodo (France) Emmanuel Collard	Porsche 997 GT3-RSR	MI	91
11	LMGTE	75	(Belgium) Prospeed Competition	(France) François Perrodo (France) Emmanuel Collard	Porsche M97/74 4.0 L Flat-6	MI	91
12	LMGTE	67	(France) IMSA Performance Matmut	(France) Patrice Milesi (France) Jean-Karl Vernay	Porsche 997 GT3-RSR	MI	91
12	LMGTE	67	(France) IMSA Performance Matmut	(France) Patrice Milesi (France) Jean-Karl Vernay	Porsche M97/74 4.0 L Flat-6	MI	91
13	LMGTE	53	(United Kingdom) Ram Racing	(United States) Gunnar Jeannette (United States) Frankie Montecalvo	Ferrari 458 Italia GT2	MI	91
13	LMGTE	53	(United Kingdom) Ram Racing	(United States) Gunnar Jeannette (United States) Frankie Montecalvo	Ferrari F136 4.5 L V8	MI	91
14	**GTC**	**69**	**(Russia) SMP Racing**	**(Italy) Fabio Babini** **(Russia) Viktor Shaytar** **(Russia) Kirill Ladygin**	**Ferrari 458 Italia GT3**	MI	**90**
14	**GTC**	**69**	**(Russia) SMP Racing**	**(Italy) Fabio Babini** **(Russia) Viktor Shaytar** **(Russia) Kirill Ladygin**	**Ferrari F136 4.5 L V8**	MI	**90**
15	GTC	72	(Russia) SMP Racing	(Russia) Devi Markozov (Russia) Alexander Frolov (Italy) Luca Persiani	Ferrari 458 Italia GT3	MI	90
15	GTC	72	(Russia) SMP Racing	(Russia) Devi Markozov (Russia) Alexander Frolov (Italy) Luca Persiani	Ferrari F136 4.5 L V8	MI	90
16	LMP2	4	(Belgium) Boutsen Ginion Racing	(United Kingdom) John Hartshorne (United Kingdom) Alex Kapadia (Kuwait) Khaled Al Mudhaf	Oreca 03	D	90
16	LMP2	4	(Belgium) Boutsen Ginion Racing	(United Kingdom) John Hartshorne (United Kingdom) Alex Kapadia (Kuwait) Khaled Al Mudhaf	Nissan VK45DE 4.5 L V8	D	90
17	GTC	62	(Italy) AF Corse	(France) Andrea Razzoli (Italy) Stefano Gai (Italy) Lorenzo Casè	Ferrari 458 Italia GT3	MI	90
17	GTC	62	(Italy) AF Corse	(France) Andrea Razzoli (Italy) Stefano Gai (Italy) Lorenzo Casè	Ferrari F136 4.5 L V8	MI	90
18	GTC	83	(Italy) Easyrace	(Italy) Fabio Mancini (Italy) Tommaso Rocca (Italy) Diego Romanini	Ferrari 458 Italia GT3	MI	88
18	GTC	83	(Italy) Easyrace	(Italy) Fabio Mancini (Italy) Tommaso Rocca (Italy) Diego Romanini	Ferrari F136 4.5 L V8	MI	88
19	LMPC	48	(France) Team Endurance Challenge	(France) Soheil Ayari (France) Anthony Pons	Oreca FLM09	MI	79
19	LMPC	48	(France) Team Endurance Challenge	(France) Soheil Ayari (France) Anthony Pons	Chevrolet LS3 6.2 L V8	MI	79
DNF	GTC	79	(United Kingdom) Ecurie Ecosse	(United Kingdom) Joe Twyman (United Kingdom) Ollie Millroy (United Kingdom) Alasdair McCaig	BMW Z4 GT3	MI	77
DNF	GTC	79	(United Kingdom) Ecurie Ecosse	(United Kingdom) Joe Twyman (United Kingdom) Ollie Millroy (United Kingdom) Alasdair McCaig	BMW P65B44 4.4 L V8	MI	77
DNF	LMGTE	54	(Italy) AF Corse	(France) Yannick Mollégol (France) Jean-Marc Bachelier (United States) Howard Blank	Ferrari 458 Italia GT2	MI	73
DNF	LMGTE	54	(Italy) AF Corse	(France) Yannick Mollégol (France) Jean-Marc Bachelier (United States) Howard Blank	Ferrari F136 4.5 L V8	MI	73
DNF	LMP2	34	(Switzerland) Race Performance	(Switzerland) Michel Frey (Switzerland) Patric Niederhauser	Oreca 03	D	2
DNF	LMP2	34	(Switzerland) Race Performance	(Switzerland) Michel Frey (Switzerland) Patric Niederhauser	Judd HK 3.6 L V8	D	2
NC	LMGTE	66	(United Kingdom) JMW Motorsport	(Italy) Andrea Bertolini (Switzerland) Joël Camathias	Ferrari 458 Italia GT2	D	68
NC	LMGTE	66	(United Kingdom) JMW Motorsport	(Italy) Andrea Bertolini (Switzerland) Joël Camathias	Ferrari F136 4.5 L V8	D	68
NC	LMPC	46	(Portugal) Algarve Pro Racing Team	(United Kingdom) C. O. Jones (Netherlands) Nick Catsburg	Oreca FLM09	MI	58
NC	LMPC	46	(Portugal) Algarve Pro Racing Team	(United Kingdom) C. O. Jones (Netherlands) Nick Catsburg	Chevrolet LS3 6.2 L V8	MI	58
DNS	GTC	60	(Netherlands) Kox Racing	(Netherlands) Peter Kox (Netherlands) Nico Pronk (Netherlands) Dennis Retera	Lamborghini Gallardo LP600+ GT3	MI	0
DNS	GTC	60	(Netherlands) Kox Racing	(Netherlands) Peter Kox (Netherlands) Nico Pronk (Netherlands) Dennis Retera	Lamborghini 5.2 L V10	MI	0

European Le Mans Series
Previous race: 3 Hours of Red Bull Ring	2013 season	Next race: 3 Hours of Le Castellet
