= 2013 3 Hours of Red Bull Ring =

Layout of the Red Bull Ring

The 2013 3 Hours of Red Bull Ring was an auto racing event held at the Red Bull Ring in Spielberg, Styria, Austria on 19–20 July 2013. It was the third round of the 2013 European Le Mans Series season, and the series' first visit to the Red Bull Ring. Thiriet by TDS Racing, with drivers Pierre Thiriet and Mathias Beche, won the race over Signatech Alpine, while the LMPC category was led by Paul-Loup Chatin and Gary Hirsch. Ram Racing's Matt Griffin and Johnny Mowlem led the LMGTE category, while Fabio Babini, Kirill Ladygin, and Viktor Shaytar of SMP Racing won the GTC class.

== Qualifying ==
=== Qualifying result ===
Pole position winners in each class are marked in bold.

Pos	Class	Team	Driver	Lap Time	Grid
1	**LMP2**	**No. 38 Jota Sport**	**Oliver Turvey**	**1:23.871**	1
2	LMP2	No. 18 Murphy Prototypes	Brendon Hartley	1:24.010	2
3	LMP2	No. 1 Thiriet by TDS Racing	Mathias Beche	1:24.054	3
4	LMP2	No. 43 Morand Racing	Franck Mailleux	1:24.318	4
5	LMP2	No. 34 Race Performance	Patric Niederhauser	1:24.407	5
6	LMP2	No. 4 Boutsen Ginion Racing	Dominik Kraihamer	1:24.794	6
7	LMP2	No. 37 SMP Racing	Maurizio Mediani	1:25.865	7
8	**LMPC**	**No. 46 Algarve Pro Racing Team**	**Nick Catsburg**	**1:28.234**	9
9	LMPC	No. 47 Team Endurance Challenge	Nico Verdonck	1:28.394	10
10	LMPC	No. 49 Team Endurance Challenge	Paul-Loup Chatin	1:28.635	11
11	LMPC	No. 48 Team Endurance Challenge	Soheil Ayari	1:28.770	12
12	**LMGTE**	**No. 77 Proton Competition**	**Nick Tandy**	**1:29.391**	13
13	LMGTE	No. 66 JMW Motorsport	Andrea Bertolini	1:29.513	14
14	LMGTE	No. 52 Ram Racing	Johnny Mowlem	1:29.629	15
15	LMGTE	No. 67 IMSA Performance Matmut	Jean-Karl Vernay	1:29.800	16
16	LMGTE	No. 75 Prospeed Competition	Emmanuel Collard	1:30.068	17
17	LMGTE	No. 53 Ram Racing	Gunnar Jeannette	1:30.103	18
18	LMGTE	No. 55 AF Corse	Marco Cioci	1:30.187	19
19	**GTC**	**No. 72 SMP Racing**	**Luca Persiani**	**1:30.705**	20
20	GTC	No. 69 SMP Racing	Kirill Ladygin	1:30.741	21
21	GTC	No. 62 AF Corse	Andrea Rizzoli	1:30.836	22
22	LMGTE	No. 54 AF Corse	Yannick Mollegol	1:30.865	23
23	LMGTE	No. 88 Proton Competition	Horst Felbermayr, Jr.	1:31.466	24
24	GTC	No. 79 Ecurie Ecosse	Ollie Millroy	1:31.765	25
25	GTC	No. 60 Kox Racing	Peter Kox	1:31.797	26
–	LMP2	No. 36 Signatech Alpine	Nelson Panciatici	No Time^{1}	8

^1 – The No. 36 Signatech Oreca-Nissan had its qualifying times nullified after it set its fastest qualifying lap while a sector of the track was under yellow flag conditions. The team was allowed to start from the back of the LMP2 class grid.

== Race ==
=== Race result ===
Class winners in bold. Cars failing to complete 70% of winner's distance marked as Not Classified (NC).

Pos	Class	No	Team	Drivers	Chassis	Tyre	Laps
Pos	Class	No	Team	Drivers	Engine	Tyre	Laps
1	**LMP2**	**1**	**(France) Thiriet by TDS Racing**	**(France) Pierre Thiriet (Switzerland) Mathias Beche**	**Oreca 03**	D	**122**
1	**LMP2**	**1**	**(France) Thiriet by TDS Racing**	**(France) Pierre Thiriet (Switzerland) Mathias Beche**	**Nissan VK45DE 4.5 L V8**	D	**122**
2	LMP2	36	(France) Signatech Alpine	(France) Pierre Ragues (France) Nelson Panciatici	Alpine A450	M	122
2	LMP2	36	(France) Signatech Alpine	(France) Pierre Ragues (France) Nelson Panciatici	Nissan VK45DE 4.5 L V8	M	122
3	LMP2	43	(Switzerland) Morand Racing	(Switzerland) Natacha Gachnang (France) Franck Mailleux	Morgan LMP2	D	122
3	LMP2	43	(Switzerland) Morand Racing	(Switzerland) Natacha Gachnang (France) Franck Mailleux	Judd HK 3.6 L V8	D	122
4	LMP2	38	(United Kingdom) Jota Sport	(United Kingdom) Simon Dolan (United Kingdom) Oliver Turvey	Zytek Z11SN	D	121
4	LMP2	38	(United Kingdom) Jota Sport	(United Kingdom) Simon Dolan (United Kingdom) Oliver Turvey	Nissan VK45DE 4.5 L V8	D	121
5	LMP2	34	(Switzerland) Race Performance	(Switzerland) Michel Frey (Switzerland) Patric Niederhauser	Oreca 03	D	121
5	LMP2	34	(Switzerland) Race Performance	(Switzerland) Michel Frey (Switzerland) Patric Niederhauser	Judd HK 3.6 L V8	D	121
6	LMP2	37	(Russia) SMP Racing	(Russia) Sergey Zlobin (Italy) Maurizio Mediani	Oreca 03	D	119
6	LMP2	37	(Russia) SMP Racing	(Russia) Sergey Zlobin (Italy) Maurizio Mediani	Nissan VK45DE 4.5 L V8	D	119
7	**LMPC**	**49**	**(France) Team Endurance Challenge**	**(France) Paul-Loup Chatin (Switzerland) Gary Hirsch**	**Oreca FLM09**	M	**118**
7	**LMPC**	**49**	**(France) Team Endurance Challenge**	**(France) Paul-Loup Chatin (Switzerland) Gary Hirsch**	**Chevrolet LS3 6.2 L V8**	M	**118**
8	LMPC	47	(France) Team Endurance Challenge	(Andorra) Alex Loan (Belgium) Nico Verdonck	Oreca FLM09	M	118
8	LMPC	47	(France) Team Endurance Challenge	(Andorra) Alex Loan (Belgium) Nico Verdonck	Chevrolet LS3 6.2 L V8	M	118
9	LMPC	46	(Portugal) Algarve Pro Racing Team	(United Kingdom) C. O. Jones (Netherlands) Nick Catsburg	Oreca FLM09	M	116
9	LMPC	46	(Portugal) Algarve Pro Racing Team	(United Kingdom) C. O. Jones (Netherlands) Nick Catsburg	Chevrolet LS3 6.2 L V8	M	116
10	**LMGTE**	**52**	**(United Kingdom) Ram Racing**	**(United Kingdom) Johnny Mowlem (Republic of Ireland) Matt Griffin**	**Ferrari 458 Italia GT2**	M	**116**
10	**LMGTE**	**52**	**(United Kingdom) Ram Racing**	**(United Kingdom) Johnny Mowlem (Republic of Ireland) Matt Griffin**	**Ferrari F136 4.5 L V8**	M	**116**
11	LMGTE	66	(United Kingdom) JMW Motorsport	(Italy) Andrea Bertolini (Switzerland) Joël Camathias	Ferrari 458 Italia GT2	D	116
11	LMGTE	66	(United Kingdom) JMW Motorsport	(Italy) Andrea Bertolini (Switzerland) Joël Camathias	Ferrari F136 4.5 L V8	D	116
12	LMGTE	53	(United Kingdom) Ram Racing	(United States) Gunnar Jeannette (United States) Frankie Montecalvo	Ferrari 458 Italia GT2	M	115
12	LMGTE	53	(United Kingdom) Ram Racing	(United States) Gunnar Jeannette (United States) Frankie Montecalvo	Ferrari F136 4.5 L V8	M	115
13	LMGTE	55	(Italy) AF Corse	(Italy) Piergiuseppe Perazzini (Italy) Marco Cioci (Italy) Federico Leo	Ferrari 458 Italia GT2	M	115
13	LMGTE	55	(Italy) AF Corse	(Italy) Piergiuseppe Perazzini (Italy) Marco Cioci (Italy) Federico Leo	Ferrari F136 4.5 L V8	M	115
14	LMPC	48	(France) Team Endurance Challenge	(France) Soheil Ayari (France) Anthony Pons	Oreca FLM09	M	115
14	LMPC	48	(France) Team Endurance Challenge	(France) Soheil Ayari (France) Anthony Pons	Chevrolet LS3 6.2 L V8	M	115
15	LMGTE	75	(Belgium) Prospeed Competition	(France) François Perrodo (France) Emmanuel Collard	Porsche 997 GT3-RSR	M	115
15	LMGTE	75	(Belgium) Prospeed Competition	(France) François Perrodo (France) Emmanuel Collard	Porsche M97/74 4.0 L Flat-6	M	115
16	LMGTE	88	(Germany) Proton Competition	(Austria) Horst Felbermayr, Sr. (Austria) Horst Felbermayr, Jr. (Austria) Klaus Bachler	Porsche 997 GT3-RSR	M	114
16	LMGTE	88	(Germany) Proton Competition	(Austria) Horst Felbermayr, Sr. (Austria) Horst Felbermayr, Jr. (Austria) Klaus Bachler	Porsche M97/74 4.0 L Flat-6	M	114
17	LMGTE	67	(France) IMSA Performance Matmut	(France) Patrice Milesi (France) Jean-Karl Vernay	Porsche 997 GT3-RSR	M	114
17	LMGTE	67	(France) IMSA Performance Matmut	(France) Patrice Milesi (France) Jean-Karl Vernay	Porsche M97/74 4.0 L Flat-6	M	114
18	**GTC**	**69**	**(Russia) SMP Racing**	**(Italy) Fabio Babini (Russia) Viktor Shaitar (Russia) Kirill Ladygin**	**Ferrari 458 Italia GT3**	M	**114**
18	**GTC**	**69**	**(Russia) SMP Racing**	**(Italy) Fabio Babini (Russia) Viktor Shaitar (Russia) Kirill Ladygin**	**Ferrari F136 4.5 L V8**	M	**114**
19	LMGTE	77	(Germany) Proton Competition	(Germany) Christian Ried (Italy) Gianluca Roda (United Kingdom) Nick Tandy	Porsche 997 GT3-RSR	M	114
19	LMGTE	77	(Germany) Proton Competition	(Germany) Christian Ried (Italy) Gianluca Roda (United Kingdom) Nick Tandy	Porsche M97/74 4.0 L Flat-6	M	114
20	GTC	62	(Italy) AF Corse	(France) Andrea Razzoli (Italy) Stefano Gai (Italy) Lorenzo Casè	Ferrari 458 Italia GT3	M	113
20	GTC	62	(Italy) AF Corse	(France) Andrea Razzoli (Italy) Stefano Gai (Italy) Lorenzo Casè	Ferrari F136 4.5 L V8	M	113
21	GTC	79	(United Kingdom) Ecurie Ecosse	(United Kingdom) Andrew Smith (United Kingdom) Ollie Millroy (United Kingdom) Alasdair McCaig	BMW Z4 GT3	M	112
21	GTC	79	(United Kingdom) Ecurie Ecosse	(United Kingdom) Andrew Smith (United Kingdom) Ollie Millroy (United Kingdom) Alasdair McCaig	BMW P65B44 4.4 L V8	M	112
22	LMGTE	54	(Italy) AF Corse	(France) Yannick Mollégol (France) Jean-Marc Bachelier (United States) Howard Blank	Ferrari 458 Italia GT2	M	112
22	LMGTE	54	(Italy) AF Corse	(France) Yannick Mollégol (France) Jean-Marc Bachelier (United States) Howard Blank	Ferrari F136 4.5 L V8	M	112
23	GTC	60	(Netherlands) Kox Racing	(Netherlands) Peter Kox (Netherlands) Nico Pronk	Lamborghini Gallardo LP600+ GT3	M	112
23	GTC	60	(Netherlands) Kox Racing	(Netherlands) Peter Kox (Netherlands) Nico Pronk	Lamborghini 5.2 L V10	M	112
24	GTC	72	(Russia) SMP Racing	(Russia) Devi Markozov (Russia) Alexander Frolov (Italy) Luca Persiani	Ferrari 458 Italia GT3	M	112
24	GTC	72	(Russia) SMP Racing	(Russia) Devi Markozov (Russia) Alexander Frolov (Italy) Luca Persiani	Ferrari F136 4.5 L V8	M	112
25	LMP2	18	(Republic of Ireland) Murphy Prototypes	(New Zealand) Brendon Hartley (Switzerland) Jonathan Hirschi	Oreca 03	D	102
25	LMP2	18	(Republic of Ireland) Murphy Prototypes	(New Zealand) Brendon Hartley (Switzerland) Jonathan Hirschi	Nissan VK45DE 4.5 L V8	D	102
DNF	LMP2	4	(Belgium) Boutsen Ginion Racing	(Austria) Dominik Kraihamer (Germany) Thomas Holzer	Oreca 03	D	69
DNF	LMP2	4	(Belgium) Boutsen Ginion Racing	(Austria) Dominik Kraihamer (Germany) Thomas Holzer	Nissan VK45DE 4.5 L V8	D	69

European Le Mans Series
Previous race: 3 Hours of Imola	2013 season	Next race: 3 Hours of Hungaroring
