= 2013 European Le Mans Series =

Seasons
- ← 2012 2014 →

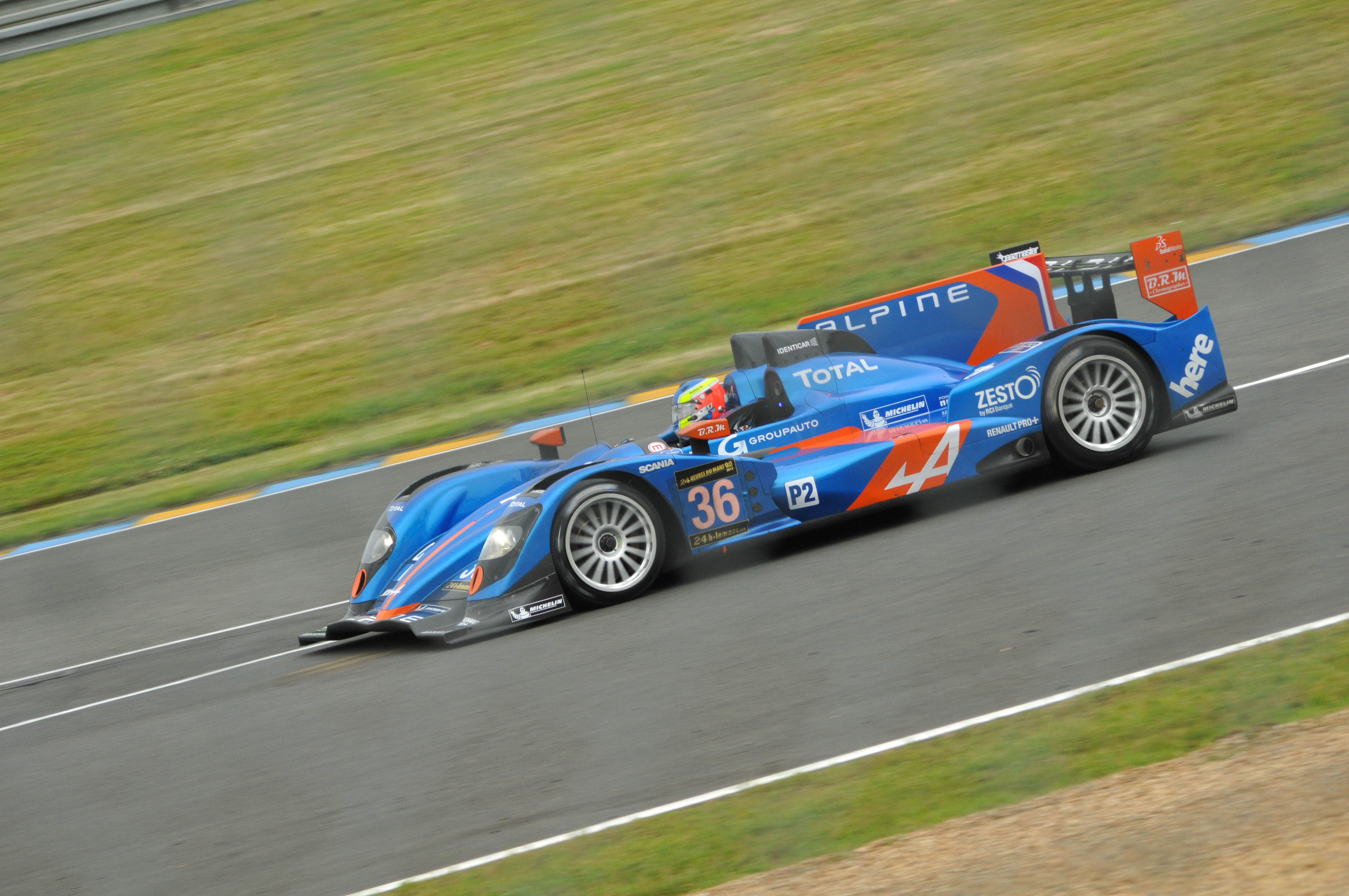
Signatech Alpine No. 36 Alpine A450, winner of the 2013 European Le Mans Series in the LMP2 class

The 2013 European Le Mans Series season was the tenth season of the Automobile Club de l'Ouest's European Le Mans Series endurance auto racing series. It is the first season of the European Le Mans Series under the control of the ACO's Le Mans Endurance Management, replacing former organisers Peter Auto. Championships are open to four categories, two of which are for Le Mans Prototypes while the other two are grand tourers. The season contested over five races starting at the Silverstone Circuit, United Kingdom on 13 April and ended at Circuit Paul Ricard, Le Castellet, Var, France on 28 September.

== Schedule ==
During the 2012 season several planned races were cancelled due to low interest from teams, leading the series to adopt several changes for the 2013 calendar. All race weekends have been shortened to two days, with practice and qualifying on Friday and the race on Saturday. Races have also been shortened from six hours to three. The European Le Mans Series will also share its weekends with several other international racing series, including the FIA World Endurance Championship, World Series by Renault, and FFSA GT Tour.

The Silverstone Circuit, United Kingdom returns to the European Le Mans Series for the first time since 2011, serving as part of a Super Endurance weekend as the ELMS race will be a precursor to the 6 Hours of Silverstone for the World Endurance Championship the following day. The Autodromo Enzo e Dino Ferrari in Imola, Italy also returns to the European Le Mans Series calendar, joined by the GT Tour series. The Red Bull Ring in Spielberg, Austria is new to the European Le Mans Series, while the Hungaroring, Hungary is another circuit with ELMS history. The season finale is at Circuit Paul Ricard, France is the only event carried over from 2012. The Circuit layout used at this event was to have the full length of the Mistral straight without the chicanes. The final three races of the season are all shared with the World Series by Renault.

Rnd	Race	Circuit	Date
1	3 Hours of Silverstone	Silverstone Circuit, Silverstone, United Kingdom	13 April
2	3 Hours of Imola	Autodromo Enzo e Dino Ferrari, Imola, Italy	18 May
3	3 Hours of Red Bull Ring	Red Bull Ring, Spielberg, Austria	20 July
4	3 Hours of Hungaroring	Hungaroring, Mogyoród, Hungary	14 September
5	3 Hours of Le Castellet	Circuit Paul Ricard, Le Castellet, France	28 September

== Entries ==
The entry list for the 2013 season was released on 8 February, and included eleven LMP2 and three LMPC cars, ten LMGTE entries, and five GTC cars, bringing the full grid up to twenty-nine entrants. However, only 23 cars turned up for the opening race of the season, the 3 Hours of Silverstone.

=== LMP2 ===
Entrant/Team	Car	Engine	Tyre	No.	Drivers	Rounds
(France) Thiriet by TDS Racing	Oreca 03	Nissan VK45DE 4.5 L V8	D	1	(France) Pierre Thiriet	All
(France) Thiriet by TDS Racing	Oreca 03	Nissan VK45DE 4.5 L V8	D	1	(Switzerland) Jonathan Hirschi	1
(France) Thiriet by TDS Racing	Oreca 03	Nissan VK45DE 4.5 L V8	D	1	(Switzerland) Mathias Beche	2–5
(United Kingdom) Greaves Motorsport	Zytek Z11SN	Nissan VK45DE 4.5 L V8	D	3	(United States) Chris Dyson	1
(United Kingdom) Greaves Motorsport	Zytek Z11SN	Nissan VK45DE 4.5 L V8	D	3	(United States) Michael Marsal	1
(United Kingdom) Greaves Motorsport	Zytek Z11SN	Nissan VK45DE 4.5 L V8	D	3	(Denmark) David Heinemeier Hansson	2
(United Kingdom) Greaves Motorsport	Zytek Z11SN	Nissan VK45DE 4.5 L V8	D	3	(United Kingdom) Tom Kimber-Smith	2
(Belgium) Boutsen Ginion Racing	Oreca 03	Nissan VK45DE 4.5 L V8	D	4	(United Kingdom) John Hartshorne	1–2, 4
(Belgium) Boutsen Ginion Racing	Oreca 03	Nissan VK45DE 4.5 L V8	D	4	(France) Bastien Brière	1–2
(Belgium) Boutsen Ginion Racing	Oreca 03	Nissan VK45DE 4.5 L V8	D	4	(France) Thomas Dagoneau	1–2
(Belgium) Boutsen Ginion Racing	Oreca 03	Nissan VK45DE 4.5 L V8	D	4	(Germany) Thomas Holzer	3
(Belgium) Boutsen Ginion Racing	Oreca 03	Nissan VK45DE 4.5 L V8	D	4	(Austria) Dominik Kraihamer	3
(Belgium) Boutsen Ginion Racing	Oreca 03	Nissan VK45DE 4.5 L V8	D	4	(United Kingdom) Alex Kapadia	4–5
(Belgium) Boutsen Ginion Racing	Oreca 03	Nissan VK45DE 4.5 L V8	D	4	(Kuwait) Khaled Al Mudhaf	4
(Belgium) Boutsen Ginion Racing	Oreca 03	Nissan VK45DE 4.5 L V8	D	4	(Belgium) Renaud Kuppens	5
(Belgium) Boutsen Ginion Racing	Oreca 03	Nissan VK45DE 4.5 L V8	D	4	(United Kingdom) James Swift	5
(Republic of Ireland) Murphy Prototypes	Oreca 03	Nissan VK45DE 4.5 L V8	D	18	(New Zealand) Brendon Hartley	All
(Republic of Ireland) Murphy Prototypes	Oreca 03	Nissan VK45DE 4.5 L V8	D	18	(United States) Mark Patterson	1–2
(Republic of Ireland) Murphy Prototypes	Oreca 03	Nissan VK45DE 4.5 L V8	D	18	(Switzerland) Jonathan Hirschi	3–5
(Canada) HVM Status GP	Lola B12/80	Judd HK 3.6 L V8	D	30	(Canada) Tony Burgess	2
(Canada) HVM Status GP	Lola B12/80	Judd HK 3.6 L V8	D	30	(Switzerland) Jonathan Hirschi	2
(Switzerland) Race Performance	Oreca 03	Judd HK 3.6 L V8	D	34	(Switzerland) Michel Frey	All
(Switzerland) Race Performance	Oreca 03	Judd HK 3.6 L V8	D	34	(Switzerland) Patric Niederhauser	1–4
(Switzerland) Race Performance	Oreca 03	Judd HK 3.6 L V8	D	34	(Switzerland) Marcello Marateotto	5
(France) Signatech Alpine	Alpine A450	Nissan VK45DE 4.5 L V8	M	36	(France) Nelson Panciatici	All
(France) Signatech Alpine	Alpine A450	Nissan VK45DE 4.5 L V8	M	36	(France) Pierre Ragues	All
(Russia) SMP Racing	Oreca 03	Nissan VK45DE 4.5 L V8	D	37	(Italy) Maurizio Mediani	3–5
(Russia) SMP Racing	Oreca 03	Nissan VK45DE 4.5 L V8	D	37	(Russia) Sergey Zlobin	3–5
(United Kingdom) Jota Sport	Zytek Z11SN	Nissan VK45DE 4.5 L V8	D	38	(United Kingdom) Simon Dolan	All
(United Kingdom) Jota Sport	Zytek Z11SN	Nissan VK45DE 4.5 L V8	D	38	(United Kingdom) Oliver Turvey	All
(Luxembourg) DKR Engineering	Lola B11/40	Judd HK 3.6 L V8	D	39	(France) Romain Brandela	1–2
(Luxembourg) DKR Engineering	Lola B11/40	Judd HK 3.6 L V8	D	39	(France) Olivier Porta	1–2
(Luxembourg) DKR Engineering	Lola B11/40	Judd HK 3.6 L V8	D	39	(France) Stéphane Raffin	1
(Luxembourg) DKR Engineering	Lola B11/40	Judd HK 3.6 L V8	D	39	(Belgium) Bernard Delhez	2
(Switzerland) Morand Racing	Morgan LMP2	Judd HK 3.6 L V8	D	43	(Switzerland) Natacha Gachnang	All
(Switzerland) Morand Racing	Morgan LMP2	Judd HK 3.6 L V8	D	43	(France) Franck Mailleux	1–3
(Switzerland) Morand Racing	Morgan LMP2	Judd HK 3.6 L V8	D	43	(Austria) Christian Klien	4–5

=== LMPC ===
Entrant/Team	Car	Engine	Tyre	No.	Drivers	Rounds
(Portugal) Algarve Pro Racing Team	Oreca FLM09	Chevrolet LS3 6.2 L V8	M	46	(Netherlands) Nicky Catsburg	3–4
(Portugal) Algarve Pro Racing Team	Oreca FLM09	Chevrolet LS3 6.2 L V8	M	46	(United Kingdom) C. O. Jones	3–4
(France) Team Endurance Challenge	Oreca FLM09	Chevrolet LS3 6.2 L V8	M	47	(Andorra) Alex Loan	1–3
(France) Team Endurance Challenge	Oreca FLM09	Chevrolet LS3 6.2 L V8	M	47	(France) Matthieu Lecuyer	1–2
(France) Team Endurance Challenge	Oreca FLM09	Chevrolet LS3 6.2 L V8	M	47	(Belgium) Nico Verdonck	3
(France) Team Endurance Challenge	Oreca FLM09	Chevrolet LS3 6.2 L V8	M	48	(France) Soheil Ayari	All
(France) Team Endurance Challenge	Oreca FLM09	Chevrolet LS3 6.2 L V8	M	48	(France) Anthony Pons	All
(France) Team Endurance Challenge	Oreca FLM09	Chevrolet LS3 6.2 L V8	M	49	(France) Paul-Loup Chatin	All
(France) Team Endurance Challenge	Oreca FLM09	Chevrolet LS3 6.2 L V8	M	49	(France) Gary Hirsch	All

=== LMGTE ===
Entrant/Team	Car	Engine	Tyre	No.	Drivers	Rounds
(United Kingdom) Ram Racing	Ferrari 458 Italia GT2	Ferrari F136 4.5 L V8	M	52	(Republic of Ireland) Matt Griffin	All
(United Kingdom) Ram Racing	Ferrari 458 Italia GT2	Ferrari F136 4.5 L V8	M	52	(United Kingdom) Johnny Mowlem	All
(United Kingdom) Ram Racing	Ferrari 458 Italia GT2	Ferrari F136 4.5 L V8	M	53	(United States) Gunnar Jeannette	All
(United Kingdom) Ram Racing	Ferrari 458 Italia GT2	Ferrari F136 4.5 L V8	M	53	(United States) Frankie Montecalvo	All
(Italy) AF Corse	Ferrari 458 Italia GT2	Ferrari F136 4.5 L V8	M	54	(France) Jean-Marc Bachelier	All
(Italy) AF Corse	Ferrari 458 Italia GT2	Ferrari F136 4.5 L V8	M	54	(United States) Howard Blank	All
(Italy) AF Corse	Ferrari 458 Italia GT2	Ferrari F136 4.5 L V8	M	54	(France) Yannick Mallégol	All
(Italy) AF Corse	Ferrari 458 Italia GT2	Ferrari F136 4.5 L V8	M	55	(Italy) Marco Cioci	All
(Italy) AF Corse	Ferrari 458 Italia GT2	Ferrari F136 4.5 L V8	M	55	(Italy) Federico Leo	All
(Italy) AF Corse	Ferrari 458 Italia GT2	Ferrari F136 4.5 L V8	M	55	(Italy) Piergiuseppe Perazzini	All
(United Kingdom) JMW Motorsport	Ferrari 458 Italia GT2	Ferrari F136 4.5 L V8	D	66	(Italy) Andrea Bertolini	All
(United Kingdom) JMW Motorsport	Ferrari 458 Italia GT2	Ferrari F136 4.5 L V8	D	66	(Switzerland) Joël Camathias	All
(France) IMSA Performance Matmut	Porsche 997 GT3-RSR	Porsche M97/74 4.0 L Flat-6	M	67	(France) Patrice Milesi	All
(France) IMSA Performance Matmut	Porsche 997 GT3-RSR	Porsche M97/74 4.0 L Flat-6	M	67	(Germany) Wolf Henzler	1
(France) IMSA Performance Matmut	Porsche 997 GT3-RSR	Porsche M97/74 4.0 L Flat-6	M	67	(United States) Patrick Long	2
(France) IMSA Performance Matmut	Porsche 997 GT3-RSR	Porsche M97/74 4.0 L Flat-6	M	67	(France) Jean-Karl Vernay	3–5
(Belgium) Prospeed Competition	Porsche 997 GT3-RSR	Porsche M97/74 4.0 L Flat-6	M	75	(France) François Perrodo	All
(Belgium) Prospeed Competition	Porsche 997 GT3-RSR	Porsche M97/74 4.0 L Flat-6	M	75	(France) Sébastien Crubilé	1–2
(Belgium) Prospeed Competition	Porsche 997 GT3-RSR	Porsche M97/74 4.0 L Flat-6	M	75	(France) Emmanuel Collard	1, 3–5
(Germany) Proton Competition	Porsche 997 GT3-RSR	Porsche M97/74 4.0 L Flat-6	M	77	(Germany) Christian Ried	All
(Germany) Proton Competition	Porsche 997 GT3-RSR	Porsche M97/74 4.0 L Flat-6	M	77	(Italy) Gianluca Roda	1–3
(Germany) Proton Competition	Porsche 997 GT3-RSR	Porsche M97/74 4.0 L Flat-6	M	77	(United Kingdom) Nick Tandy	1, 3–5
(Germany) Proton Competition	Porsche 997 GT3-RSR	Porsche M97/74 4.0 L Flat-6	M	77	(Italy) Paolo Ruberti	2
(Germany) Proton Competition	Porsche 997 GT3-RSR	Porsche M97/74 4.0 L Flat-6	M	77	(Austria) Klaus Bachler	4–5
(Germany) Proton Competition	Porsche 997 GT3-RSR	Porsche M97/74 4.0 L Flat-6	M	88	(Austria) Klaus Bachler	3
(Germany) Proton Competition	Porsche 997 GT3-RSR	Porsche M97/74 4.0 L Flat-6	M	88	(Austria) Horst Felbermayr Jr.	3
(Germany) Proton Competition	Porsche 997 GT3-RSR	Porsche M97/74 4.0 L Flat-6	M	88	(Austria) Horst Felbermayr Sr.	3

=== GTC ===
Entrant/Team	Car	Engine	Tyre	No.	Drivers	Rounds
(Netherlands) Kox Racing	Lamborghini Gallardo LP600+ GT3	Lamborghini CEH 5.2 L V10	M	60	(Netherlands) Peter Kox	2–5
(Netherlands) Kox Racing	Lamborghini Gallardo LP600+ GT3	Lamborghini CEH 5.2 L V10	M	60	(Netherlands) Nico Pronk	2–5
(Netherlands) Kox Racing	Lamborghini Gallardo LP600+ GT3	Lamborghini CEH 5.2 L V10	M	60	(Netherlands) Dennis Retera	4–5
(Italy) AF Corse	Ferrari 458 Italia GT3	Ferrari F136 4.5 L V8	M	62	(Italy) Lorenzo Casè	All
(Italy) AF Corse	Ferrari 458 Italia GT3	Ferrari F136 4.5 L V8	M	62	(Italy) Stefano Gai	All
(Italy) AF Corse	Ferrari 458 Italia GT3	Ferrari F136 4.5 L V8	M	62	(Italy) Andrea Rizzoli	All
(United States) Momo Megatron DF1	Audi R8 LMS ultra	Audi BUJ 5.2 L V10	M	65	(Switzerland) Raffi Bader	1–2
(United States) Momo Megatron DF1	Audi R8 LMS ultra	Audi BUJ 5.2 L V10	M	65	(Belgium) Dylan Derdaele	1–2
(United States) Momo Megatron DF1	Audi R8 LMS ultra	Audi BUJ 5.2 L V10	M	65	(Poland) Kuba Giermaziak	1–2
(Russia) SMP Racing	Ferrari 458 Italia GT3	Ferrari F136 4.5 L V8	M	68	(Russia) Yury Evstigneev	2
(Russia) SMP Racing	Ferrari 458 Italia GT3	Ferrari F136 4.5 L V8	M	68	(Russia) Alexander Frolov	2
(Russia) SMP Racing	Ferrari 458 Italia GT3	Ferrari F136 4.5 L V8	M	68	(Russia) David Markozov	2
(Russia) SMP Racing	Ferrari 458 Italia GT3	Ferrari F136 4.5 L V8	M	68	(Russia) Anton Ladygin	5
(Russia) SMP Racing	Ferrari 458 Italia GT3	Ferrari F136 4.5 L V8	M	68	(Russia) Boris Rotenberg	5
(Russia) SMP Racing	Ferrari 458 Italia GT3	Ferrari F136 4.5 L V8	M	68	(Finland) Mika Salo	5
(Russia) SMP Racing	Ferrari 458 Italia GT3	Ferrari F136 4.5 L V8	M	69	(Italy) Fabio Babini	2–5
(Russia) SMP Racing	Ferrari 458 Italia GT3	Ferrari F136 4.5 L V8	M	69	(Russia) Kirill Ladygin	2–5
(Russia) SMP Racing	Ferrari 458 Italia GT3	Ferrari F136 4.5 L V8	M	69	(Russia) Viktor Shaytar	2–5
(Russia) SMP Racing	Ferrari 458 Italia GT3	Ferrari F136 4.5 L V8	M	72	(Russia) Boris Rotenberg	2
(Russia) SMP Racing	Ferrari 458 Italia GT3	Ferrari F136 4.5 L V8	M	72	(Italy) Maurizio Mediani	2
(Russia) SMP Racing	Ferrari 458 Italia GT3	Ferrari F136 4.5 L V8	M	72	(Russia) Sergey Zlobin	2
(Russia) SMP Racing	Ferrari 458 Italia GT3	Ferrari F136 4.5 L V8	M	72	(Russia) Alexander Frolov	3–5
(Russia) SMP Racing	Ferrari 458 Italia GT3	Ferrari F136 4.5 L V8	M	72	(Russia) David Markozov	3–5
(Russia) SMP Racing	Ferrari 458 Italia GT3	Ferrari F136 4.5 L V8	M	72	(Italy) Luca Persiani	3–5
(United Kingdom) Ecurie Ecosse	BMW Z4 GT3	BMW P65B44 4.4 L V8	M	79	(United Kingdom) Ollie Millroy	All
(United Kingdom) Ecurie Ecosse	BMW Z4 GT3	BMW P65B44 4.4 L V8	M	79	(United Kingdom) Andrew Smith	1–3, 5
(United Kingdom) Ecurie Ecosse	BMW Z4 GT3	BMW P65B44 4.4 L V8	M	79	(United Kingdom) Alasdair McCaig	1, 3–4
(United Kingdom) Ecurie Ecosse	BMW Z4 GT3	BMW P65B44 4.4 L V8	M	79	(United Kingdom) Joe Twyman	2, 4
(United Kingdom) Ecurie Ecosse	BMW Z4 GT3	BMW P65B44 4.4 L V8	M	79	(United Kingdom) Phil Quaife	5
(Italy) Easyrace	Ferrari 458 Italia GT3	Ferrari F136 4.5 L V8	M	83	(Italy) Fabio Mancini	4
(Italy) Easyrace	Ferrari 458 Italia GT3	Ferrari F136 4.5 L V8	M	83	(Italy) Tommaso Rocca	4
(Italy) Easyrace	Ferrari 458 Italia GT3	Ferrari F136 4.5 L V8	M	83	(Italy) Diego Romanini	4
(Luxembourg) DKR Engineering	BMW Z4 GT3 (Spec 2011)	BMW P65B44 4.4 L V8	M	85	(France) Thomas Accary	5
(Luxembourg) DKR Engineering	BMW Z4 GT3 (Spec 2011)	BMW P65B44 4.4 L V8	M	85	(France) Dimitri Enjalbert	5
(Luxembourg) DKR Engineering	BMW Z4 GT3 (Spec 2011)	BMW P65B44 4.4 L V8	M	85	(France) Matthieu Lecuyer	5
(Italy) Scuderia Villorba Corse	Ferrari 458 Italia GT3	Ferrari F136 4.5 L V8	M	86	(France) Steeve Hiesse	5
(Italy) Scuderia Villorba Corse	Ferrari 458 Italia GT3	Ferrari F136 4.5 L V8	M	86	(France) Cédric Mézard	5

== Season results ==
Rnd.	Circuit	LMP2 Winning Team	LMPC Winning Team	LMGTE Winning Team	GTC Winning Team	Results
Rnd.	Circuit	LMP2 Winning Drivers	LMPC Winning Drivers	LMGTE Winning Drivers	GTC Winning Drivers	Results
1	Silverstone	(United Kingdom) No. 38 Jota Sport	(France) No. 48 Team Endurance Challenge	(Germany) No. 77 Proton Competition	(United Kingdom) No. 79 Ecurie Ecosse	Report
1	Silverstone	(United Kingdom) Simon Dolan (United Kingdom) Oliver Turvey	(France) Soheil Ayari (France) Anthony Pons	(Germany) Christien Ried (Italy) Gianluca Roda (United Kingdom) Nick Tandy	(United Kingdom) Alisdair McCaig (United Kingdom) Ollie Millroy (United Kingdom) Andrew Smith	Report
2	Imola	(France) No. 1 Thiriet by TDS Racing	(France) No. 49 Team Endurance Challenge	(United Kingdom) No. 52 Ram Racing	(Russia) No. 69 SMP Racing	Report
2	Imola	(Switzerland) Mathias Beche (France) Pierre Thiriet	(France) Paul-Loup Chatin (France) Gary Hirsch	(Republic of Ireland) Matt Griffin (United Kingdom) Johnny Mowlem	(Italy) Fabio Babini (Russia) Kirill Ladygin (Russia) Viktor Shaytar	Report
3	Red Bull Ring	(France) No. 1 Thiriet by TDS Racing	(France) No. 49 Team Endurance Challenge	(United Kingdom) No. 52 Ram Racing	(Russia) No. 69 SMP Racing	Report
3	Red Bull Ring	(Switzerland) Mathias Beche (France) Pierre Thiriet	(France) Paul-Loup Chatin (France) Gary Hirsch	(Republic of Ireland) Matt Griffin (United Kingdom) Johnny Mowlem	(Italy) Fabio Babini (Russia) Kirill Ladygin (Russia) Viktor Shaytar	Report
4	Hungaroring	(France) No. 36 Signatech Alpine	(France) No. 49 Team Endurance Challenge	(United Kingdom) No. 77 Proton Competition	(Russia) No. 69 SMP Racing	Report
4	Hungaroring	(France) Nelson Panciatici (France) Pierre Ragues	(France) Paul-Loup Chatin (France) Gary Hirsch	(Austria) Klaus Bachler (Germany) Christian Ried (United Kingdom) Nick Tandy	(Italy) Fabio Babini (Russia) Kirill Ladygin (Russia) Viktor Shaytar	Report
5	Paul Ricard	(Republic of Ireland) No. 18 Murphy Prototypes	(France) No. 48 Team Endurance Challenge	(United Kingdom) No. 52 Ram Racing	(Russia) No. 69 SMP Racing	Report
5	Paul Ricard	(New Zealand) Brendon Hartley (Switzerland) Jonathan Hirschi	(France) Soheil Ayari (France) Anthony Pons	(Republic of Ireland) Matt Griffin (United Kingdom) Johnny Mowlem	(Italy) Fabio Babini (Russia) Kirill Ladygin (Russia) Viktor Shaytar	Report

== Championship Standings ==
Points System

Position	1st	2nd	3rd	4th	5th	6th	7th	8th	9th	10th	Other Classified
Points	25	18	15	12	10	8	6	4	2	1	0.5

== Teams Championships ==
=== LMP2 Standings ===
Pos	Team	SIL (United Kingdom)	IMO (Italy)	RBR (Austria)	HUN (Hungary)	LEC (France)	Total
1	#36 Signatech Alpine	4	2	2	1	4	85
2	#1 Thiriet by TDS Racing	3	1	1	6	8	77
3	#38 Jota Sport	1	Ret	4	3	3	71
4	#18 Murphy Prototypes	7	6	7	2	1	64
5	#43 Morand Racing	Ret	3	3	5	2	58
6	#34 Race Performance	2	4	5	Ret	7	46
7	#4 Boutsen Ginion Racing	5	7	Ret	7	5	32
8	#37 SMP Racing			6	4	6	28
9	#3 Greaves Motorsport	Ret	5				10
10	#39 DKR Engineering	6	Ret				8
11	#30 HVM Status GP		8				4

=== LMPC Standings ===
Pos	Team	SIL (United Kingdom)	IMO (Italy)	RBR (Austria)	HUN (Hungary)	LEC (France)	Total
1	#49 Team Endurance Challenge	2	1	1	1	2	115
2	#48 Team Endurance Challenge	1	2	4	2	1	98
3	#47 Team Endurance Challenge	Ret	3	2			33
4	#46 Algarve Pro Racing Team			3	Ret		16

=== GTE Standings ===
Pos	Team	SIL (United Kingdom)	IMO (Italy)	RBR (Austria)	HUN (Hungary)	LEC (France)	Total
1	#52 Ram Racing	2	1	1	2	1	114
2	#77 Proton Competition	1	5	8	1	3	80
3	#55 AF Corse	7	2	4	3	4	63
4	#53 Ram Racing	3	3	3	6	5	63
5	#66 JMW Motorsport	4	4	2	Ret	2	61
6	#75 Prospeed Competition	5	Ret	5	4	6	40
7	#67 IMSA Performance Matmut	6	6	7	5	7	38
8	#54 AF Corse	8	7	9	Ret	8	16
9	#88 Proton Competition			6			8

=== GTC Standings ===
Pos	Team	SIL (United Kingdom)	IMO (Italy)	RBR (Austria)	HUN (Hungary)	LEC (France)	Total
1	#69 SMP Racing		1	1	1	1	100
2	#62 AF Corse	2	2	2	3	7	76
3	#79 Ecurie Ecosse	1	3	3	Ret	4	67
4	#72 SMP Racing		4	5	2	2	59
5	#68 SMP Racing		5			5	21
6	#65 Momo Megatron DF1	3	Ret				16
7	#86 Scuderia Villorba Corse					3	15
8	#60 Kox Racing		Ret	4	Ret	Ret	13
9	#83 Easyrace				4		12
10	#85 DKR Engineering					6	8

== Drivers Championships ==
=== LMP2 Standings ===
Pos	Driver	SIL (United Kingdom)	IMO (Italy)	RBR (Austria)	HUN (Hungary)	LEC (France)	Total
1	(France) Nelson Panciatici	4	2	2	1	4	85
1	(France) Pierre Ragues	4	2	2	1	4	85
2	(France) Pierre Thiriet	3	1	1	6	8	77
3	(United Kingdom) Oliver Turvey	1	Ret	4	3	3	71
3	(United Kingdom) Simon Dolan	1	Ret	4	3	3	71
4	(Switzerland) Jonathan Hirschi	3	8	7	2	1	69
5	(New Zealand) Brendon Hartley	7	6	7	2	1	64
6	(Switzerland) Mathias Beche		1	1	6	8	62
7	(Switzerland) Natacha Gachnang	Ret	3	3	5	2	58
8	(Switzerland) Michel Frey	2	4	5	Ret	7	46
9	(Switzerland) Patric Niederhauser	2	4	5	Ret		40
10	(France) Franck Mailleux	Ret	3	3			30
11	(Austria) Christian Klien				5	2	28
12	(Italy) Maurizio Mediani			6	4	6	28
12	(Russia) Sergey Zlobin			6	4	6	28
13	(United Kingdom) Alex Kapadia				7	5	16
14	(United Kingdom) John Hartshorne	5	7		EX (Note: John Hartshorne did not have sufficient speed during qualifying for the 3 Hours of Hungaroring. Due to safety concerns surrounding his pace and the weather forecast for the race, the stewards chose to exclude Hartshorne from race participation.)		16
14	(France) Bastien Brière	5	7				16
14	(France) Thomas Dagoneau	5	7				16
15	(United States) Mark Patterson	7	6				14
16	(Belgium) Renaud Kuppens					5	10
16	(United Kingdom) James Swift					5	10
17	(Denmark) David Heinemeier Hansson		5				10
17	(United Kingdom) Tom Kimber-Smith		5				10
18	(France) Romain Brandela	6	Ret				8
18	(France) Olivier Porta	6	Ret				8
18	(France) Stéphane Raffin	6					8
19	(Switzerland) Marcello Marateotto					7	6
20	(Canada) Tony Burgess		8				4
21	(Kuwait) Khaled Al Mudhaf				7 (Note: Khaled Al Mudhaf did not score points at the 3 Hours of Hungaroring due to a drive time infringement.)		0
22	(United States) Chris Dyson	Ret					0
22	(United States) Michael Marsal	Ret					0
23	(Germany) Thomas Holzer			Ret			0
23	(Austria) Dominik Kraihamer			Ret			0
24	(Belgium) Bernard Delhez		Ret				0

=== LMPC Standings ===
Pos	Driver	SIL (United Kingdom)	IMO (Italy)	RBR (Austria)	HUN (Hungary)	LEC (France)	Points
1	(France) Gary Hirsch	2	1	1	1	2	115
1	(France) Paul-Loup Chatin	2	1	1	1	2	115
2	(France) Anthony Pons	1	2	4	2	1	98
2	(France) Soheil Ayari	1	2	4	2	1	98
3	(Andorra) Alex Loan	Ret	3	2			33
4	(Belgium) Nico Verdonck			2			18
5	(United Kingdom) C. O. Jones			3	Ret		16
5	(Netherlands) Nick Catsburg			3	Ret		16
6	(France) Matthieu Lecuyer	Ret	3				15

=== GTE Standings ===
Pos	Driver	SIL (United Kingdom)	IMO (Italy)	RBR (Austria)	HUN (Hungary)	LEC (France)	Points
1	(United Kingdom) Johnny Mowlem	2	1	1	2	1	114
1	(Republic of Ireland) Matt Griffin	2	1	1	2	1	114
2	(Germany) Christian Ried	1	5	8	1	3	80
3	(United Kingdom) Nick Tandy	1		8	1	3	70
4	(Italy) Marco Cioci	7	2	4	3	4	63
4	(Italy) Piergiuseppe Perazzini	7	2	4	3	4	63
4	(Italy) Federico Leo	7	2	4	3	4	63
5	(United States) Frankie Montecalvo	3	3	3	6	5	63
5	(United States) Gunnar Jeannette	3	3	3	6	5	63
6	(Italy) Andrea Bertolini	4	4	2	Ret	2	61
6	(Switzerland) Joël Camathias	4	4	2	Ret	2	61
7	(Italy) Klaus Bachler			6	1	3	48
8	(France) Emmanuel Collard	5		5	4	6	40
8	(France) François Perrodo	5	Ret	5	4	6	40
8	(Italy) Gianluca Roda	1	5	8			40
9	(France) Patrice Milesi	6	6	7	5	7	38
10	(France) Jean-Karl Vernay			7	5	7	22
11	(France) Jean-Marc Bachelier	8	7	9	Ret	8	16
11	(United States) Howard Blank	8	7	9	Ret	8	16
11	(France) Yannick Mallégol	8	7	9	Ret	8	16
12	(France) Sébastien Crubilé	5	Ret				10
12	(Italy) Paolo Ruberti		5				10
13	(Germany) Wolf Henzler	6					8
13	(United States) Patrick Long		6				8
13	(Austria) Horst Felbermayr Jr.			6			8

=== GTC Standings ===
Pos	Driver	SIL (United Kingdom)	IMO (Italy)	RBR (Austria)	HUN (Hungary)	LEC (France)	Points
1	(Italy) Fabio Babini		1	1	1	1	100
1	(Russia) Kirill Ladygin		1	1	1	1	100
1	(Russia) Viktor Shaytar		1	1	1	1	100
2	(Italy) Andrea Rizzoli	2	2	2	3	7	76
2	(Italy) Lorenzo Casè	2	2	2	3	7	76
2	(Italy) Stefano Gai	2	2	2	3	7	76
3	(United Kingdom) Andrew Smith	1	3	3		4	67
3	(United Kingdom) Ollie Millroy	1	3	3	Ret	4	67
4	(Russia) Alexander Frolov		5	5	2	2	57
4	(Russia) David Markozov		5	5	2	2	57
5	(Italy) Luca Persiani			5	2	2	47
6	(United Kingdom) Alasdair McCaig	1		3	Ret		40
7	(Russia) Boris Rotenberg		4			5	23
8	(Switzerland) Raffi Bader	3	Ret				16
8	(Belgium) Dylan Derdaele	3	Ret				16
8	(Poland) Kuba Giermaziak	3	Ret				16
9	(United Kingdom) Joe Twyman		3		Ret		15
9	(France) Steeve Hiesse					3	15
9	(France) Cédric Mézard					3	15
10	(Netherlands) Peter Kox		Ret	4	Ret	Ret	13
10	(Netherlands) Nico Pronk		Ret	4	Ret	Ret	13
11	(Italy) Fabio Mancini				4		12
11	(Italy) Tommaso Rocca				4		12
11	(Italy) Diego Romanini				4		12
11	(United Kingdom) Phil Quaife					4	12
12	(Russia) Anton Ladygin					5	11
12	(Finland) Mika Salo					5	11
13	(Russia) Yury Evstigneev		5				10
14	(France) Thomas Accary					6	8
14	(France) Dimitri Enjalbert					6	8
14	(France) Matthieu Lecuyer					6	8
