= 2013 3 Hours of Imola =

Auto race in Italy

The Autodromo Enzo e Dino Ferrari

The 2013 3 Hours of Imola was an auto racing event held at the Autodromo Enzo e Dino Ferrari, Imola, Italy on 17–18 May 2013, and served as the second round of the 2013 European Le Mans Series season. Defending ELMS champions Pierre Thiriet and Mathias Beche of Thiriet by TDS Racing won the race over the Signatech Alpine. Paul-Loup Chatin and Gary Hirsch held the LMPC category lead from start to finish, while Johnny Mowlem and Matt Griffin earned Ram Racing their first victory in only their second LMGTE race. Fabio Babini, Viktor Shaytar, and Kirill Ladygin won the GTC class on their debut.

== Qualifying ==
=== Qualifying result ===
Pole position winners in each class are marked in bold.

Pos	Class	Team	Driver	Lap Time	Grid
1	**LMP2**	**No. 38 Jota Sport**	**Oliver Turvey**	**1:34.343**	1
2	LMP2	No. 1 Thiriet by TDS Racing	Mathias Beche	1:34.914	2
3	LMP2	No. 18 Murphy Prototypes	Brendon Hartley	1:34.951	3
4	LMP2	No. 36 Signatech Alpine	Nelson Panciatici	1:35.538	4
5	LMP2	No. 3 Greaves Motorsport	Tom Kimber-Smith	1:35.606	5
6	LMP2	No. 43 Morand Racing	Franck Mailleux	1:36.320	6
7	LMP2	No. 34 Race Performance	Patric Niederhauser	1:36.444	7
8	LMP2	No. 30 HVM Status GP	Jonathan Hirschi	1:37.309	8
9	LMP2	No. 4 Boutsen Ginion Racing	Bastien Brière	1:38.128	9
10	**LMPC**	**No. 49 Team Endurance Challenge**	**Gary Hirsch**	**1:39.222**	10
11	LMP2	No. 39 DKR Engineering	Olivier Porta	1:41.445	11
12	LMPC	No. 47 Team Endurance Challenge	Matthieu Lecuyer	1:41.708	12
13	**LMGTE**	**No. 52 Ram Racing**	**Matt Griffin**	**1:41.994**	13
14	LMGTE	No. 67 IMSA Performance Matmut	Patrick Long	1:42.055	14
15	LMPC	No. 48 Team Endurance Challenge	Anthony Pons	1:42.093	15
16	LMGTE	No. 53 Ram Racing	Gunnar Jeannette	1:42.669	16
17	LMGTE	No. 66 JMW Motorsport	Joël Camathias	1:42.911	17
18	LMGTE	No. 54 AF Corse	Yannick Mollégol	1:43.551	18
19	**GTC**	**No. 60 Kox Racing**	**Peter Kox**	**1:43.752**	19
20	GTC	No. 62 AF Corse	Stefano Gai	1:44.235	20
21	LMGTE	No. 55 AF Corse	Piergiuseppe Perazzini	1:44.478	21
22	LMGTE	No. 77 Proton Competition	Christian Ried	1:45.173	22
23	GTC	No. 65 Momo Megatron DF1	Kuba Giermaziak	1:45.786	23
24	GTC	No. 79 Ecurie Ecosse	Andrew Smith	1:45.831	24
25	GTC	No. 69 SMP Racing	Kirill Ladygin	1:46.149	25
26	LMGTE	No. 75 Prospeed Competition	Sebastien Crubilé	1:46.358	26
27	GTC	No. 68 SMP Racing	Devi Markozov	1:49.733^{1}	27
–	GTC	No. 72 SMP Racing	Maurizio Mediani	No Time^{1}	28

- **^1** - The No. 68 and No. 72 Ferraris had qualifying laps eliminated by stewards decision.

== Race ==
=== Race result ===
Class winners in bold. Cars failing to complete 70% of winner's distance marked as Not Classified (NC).

Pos	Class	No	Team	Drivers	Chassis	Tyre	Laps
Pos	Class	No	Team	Drivers	Engine	Tyre	Laps
1	**LMP2**	**1**	**(France) Thiriet by TDS Racing**	**(France) Pierre Thiriet (Switzerland) Mathias Beche**	**Oreca 03**	D	**108**
1	**LMP2**	**1**	**(France) Thiriet by TDS Racing**	**(France) Pierre Thiriet (Switzerland) Mathias Beche**	**Nissan VK45DE 4.5 L V8**	D	**108**
2	LMP2	36	(France) Signatech Alpine	(France) Pierre Ragues (France) Nelson Panciatici	Alpine A450	M	108
2	LMP2	36	(France) Signatech Alpine	(France) Pierre Ragues (France) Nelson Panciatici	Nissan VK45DE 4.5 L V8	M	108
3	LMP2	43	(Switzerland) Morand Racing	(Switzerland) Natacha Gachnang (France) Franck Mailleux	Morgan LMP2	D	107
3	LMP2	43	(Switzerland) Morand Racing	(Switzerland) Natacha Gachnang (France) Franck Mailleux	Judd HK 3.6 L V8	D	107
4	LMP2	34	(Switzerland) Race Performance	(Switzerland) Michel Frey (Switzerland) Patric Niederhauser	Oreca 03	D	107
4	LMP2	34	(Switzerland) Race Performance	(Switzerland) Michel Frey (Switzerland) Patric Niederhauser	Judd HK 3.6 L V8	D	107
5	LMP2	3	(United Kingdom) Greaves Motorsport	(United Kingdom) Tom Kimber-Smith (Denmark) David Heinemeier Hansson	Zytek Z11SN	D	107
5	LMP2	3	(United Kingdom) Greaves Motorsport	(United Kingdom) Tom Kimber-Smith (Denmark) David Heinemeier Hansson	Nissan VK45DE 4.5 L V8	D	107
6	LMP2	18	(Republic of Ireland) Murphy Prototypes	(New Zealand) Brendon Hartley (United States) Mark Patterson	Oreca 03	D	105
6	LMP2	18	(Republic of Ireland) Murphy Prototypes	(New Zealand) Brendon Hartley (United States) Mark Patterson	Nissan VK45DE 4.5 L V8	D	105
7	**LMPC**	**49**	**(France) Team Endurance Challenge**	**(France) Paul-Loup Chatin (Switzerland) Gary Hirsch**	**Oreca FLM09**	M	**103**
7	**LMPC**	**49**	**(France) Team Endurance Challenge**	**(France) Paul-Loup Chatin (Switzerland) Gary Hirsch**	**Chevrolet LS3 6.2 L V8**	M	**103**
8	**LMGTE**	**52**	**(United Kingdom) Ram Racing**	**(United Kingdom) Johnny Mowlem (Republic of Ireland) Matt Griffin**	**Ferrari 458 Italia GT2**	M	**102**
8	**LMGTE**	**52**	**(United Kingdom) Ram Racing**	**(United Kingdom) Johnny Mowlem (Republic of Ireland) Matt Griffin**	**Ferrari F136 4.5 L V8**	M	**102**
9	LMPC	48	(France) Team Endurance Challenge	(France) Soheil Ayari (France) Anthony Pons	Oreca FLM09	M	102
9	LMPC	48	(France) Team Endurance Challenge	(France) Soheil Ayari (France) Anthony Pons	Chevrolet LS3 6.2 L V8	M	102
10	LMPC	47	(France) Team Endurance Challenge	(Andorra) Alex Loan (France) Matthieu Lecuyer	Oreca FLM09	M	102
10	LMPC	47	(France) Team Endurance Challenge	(Andorra) Alex Loan (France) Matthieu Lecuyer	Chevrolet LS3 6.2 L V8	M	102
11	LMGTE	55	(Italy) AF Corse	(Italy) Piergiuseppe Perazzini (Italy) Marco Cioci (Italy) Federico Leo	Ferrari 458 Italia GT2	M	101
11	LMGTE	55	(Italy) AF Corse	(Italy) Piergiuseppe Perazzini (Italy) Marco Cioci (Italy) Federico Leo	Ferrari F136 4.5 L V8	M	101
12	LMGTE	53	(United Kingdom) Ram Racing	(United States) Gunnar Jeannette (United States) Frankie Montecalvo	Ferrari 458 Italia GT2	M	101
12	LMGTE	53	(United Kingdom) Ram Racing	(United States) Gunnar Jeannette (United States) Frankie Montecalvo	Ferrari F136 4.5 L V8	M	101
13	LMGTE	66	(United Kingdom) JMW Motorsport	(Italy) Andrea Bertolini (Switzerland) Joël Camathias	Ferrari 458 Italia GT2	D	101
13	LMGTE	66	(United Kingdom) JMW Motorsport	(Italy) Andrea Bertolini (Switzerland) Joël Camathias	Ferrari F136 4.5 L V8	D	101
14	LMP2	4	(Belgium) Boutsen Ginion Racing	(France) Bastien Brière (France) Thomas Dagoneau (United Kingdom) John Hartshone	Oreca 03	D	101
14	LMP2	4	(Belgium) Boutsen Ginion Racing	(France) Bastien Brière (France) Thomas Dagoneau (United Kingdom) John Hartshone	Nissan VK45DE 4.5 L V8	D	101
15	LMGTE	77	(Germany) Proton Competition	(Germany) Christian Ried (Italy) Gianluca Roda (Italy) Paolo Ruberti	Porsche 997 GT3-RSR	M	101
15	LMGTE	77	(Germany) Proton Competition	(Germany) Christian Ried (Italy) Gianluca Roda (Italy) Paolo Ruberti	Porsche M97/74 4.0 L Flat-6	M	101
16	LMGTE	67	(France) IMSA Performance Matmut	(France) Patrice Milesi (United States) Patrick Long	Porsche 997 GT3-RSR	M	100
16	LMGTE	67	(France) IMSA Performance Matmut	(France) Patrice Milesi (United States) Patrick Long	Porsche M97/74 4.0 L Flat-6	M	100
17	**GTC**	**69**	**(Russia) SMP Racing**	**(Italy) Fabio Babini (Russia) Viktor Shaitar (Russia) Kirill Ladygin**	**Ferrari 458 Italia GT3**	M	**100**
17	**GTC**	**69**	**(Russia) SMP Racing**	**(Italy) Fabio Babini (Russia) Viktor Shaitar (Russia) Kirill Ladygin**	**Ferrari F136 4.5 L V8**	M	**100**
18	GTC	62	(Italy) AF Corse	(Italy) Andrea Rizzoli (Italy) Stefano Gai (Italy) Lorenzo Casè	Ferrari 458 Italia GT3	M	99
18	GTC	62	(Italy) AF Corse	(Italy) Andrea Rizzoli (Italy) Stefano Gai (Italy) Lorenzo Casè	Ferrari F136 4.5 L V8	M	99
19	GTC	79	(United Kingdom) Ecurie Ecosse	(United Kingdom) Andrew Smith (United Kingdom) Ollie Millroy (United Kingdom) Joe Twyman	BMW Z4 GT3	M	97
19	GTC	79	(United Kingdom) Ecurie Ecosse	(United Kingdom) Andrew Smith (United Kingdom) Ollie Millroy (United Kingdom) Joe Twyman	BMW P65B44 4.4 L V8	M	97
20	LMGTE	54	(Italy) AF Corse	(France) Yannick Mollégol (France) Jean-Marc Bachelier (United States) Howard Blank	Ferrari 458 Italia GT3	M	97
20	LMGTE	54	(Italy) AF Corse	(France) Yannick Mollégol (France) Jean-Marc Bachelier (United States) Howard Blank	Ferrari F136 4.5 L V8	M	97
21	GTC	72	(Russia) SMP Racing	(Italy) Maurizio Mediani (Russia) Sergey Zlobin (Russia) Boris Rotenberg	Ferrari 458 Italia GT3	M	97
21	GTC	72	(Russia) SMP Racing	(Italy) Maurizio Mediani (Russia) Sergey Zlobin (Russia) Boris Rotenberg	Ferrari F136 4.5 L V8	M	97
22	GTC	68	(Russia) SMP Racing	(Russia) Devi Markozov (Russia) Yury Evstigneez (Russia) Alexander Frolov	Ferrari 458 Italia GT3	M	96
22	GTC	68	(Russia) SMP Racing	(Russia) Devi Markozov (Russia) Yury Evstigneez (Russia) Alexander Frolov	Ferrari F136 4.5 L V8	M	96
23	LMP2	30	(Canada) HVM Status GP	(Canada) Tony Burgess (Switzerland) Jonathan Hirschi	Lola B12/80	D	89
23	LMP2	30	(Canada) HVM Status GP	(Canada) Tony Burgess (Switzerland) Jonathan Hirschi	Judd HK 3.6 L V8	D	89
DNF	LMP2	38	(United Kingdom) Jota Sport	(United Kingdom) Simon Dolan (United Kingdom) Oliver Turvey	Zytek Z11SN	D	101
DNF	LMP2	38	(United Kingdom) Jota Sport	(United Kingdom) Simon Dolan (United Kingdom) Oliver Turvey	Nissan VK45DE 4.5 L V8	D	101
DNF	GTC	60	(Netherlands) Kox Racing	(Netherlands) Peter Kox (Netherlands) Nico Pronk	Lamborghini Gallardo LP600+ GT3	M	97
DNF	GTC	60	(Netherlands) Kox Racing	(Netherlands) Peter Kox (Netherlands) Nico Pronk	Lamborghini 5.2 L V10	M	97
DNF	LMP2	39	(Luxembourg) DKR Engineering	(France) Olivier Porta (France) Romain Brandela (Belgium) Bernard Delhez	Lola B11/40	D	89
DNF	LMP2	39	(Luxembourg) DKR Engineering	(France) Olivier Porta (France) Romain Brandela (Belgium) Bernard Delhez	Judd HK 3.6 L V8	D	89
DNF	GTC	65	(United States) Momo Megatron DF1	(Belgium) Dylan Derdaele (Switzerland) Raffi Bader (Poland) Kuba Giermaziak	Audi R8 LMS ultra	M	60
DNF	GTC	65	(United States) Momo Megatron DF1	(Belgium) Dylan Derdaele (Switzerland) Raffi Bader (Poland) Kuba Giermaziak	Audi DAR 5.2 L V10	M	60
DNF	LMGTE	75	(Belgium) Prospeed Competition	(France) François Perrodo (France) Sébastien Crubilé	Porsche 997 GT3-RSR	M	43
DNF	LMGTE	75	(Belgium) Prospeed Competition	(France) François Perrodo (France) Sébastien Crubilé	Porsche M97/74 4.0 L Flat-6	M	43

European Le Mans Series
Previous race: 3 Hours of Silverstone	2013 season	Next race: 3 Hours of Red Bull Ring
