= 2013 3 Hours of Silverstone =

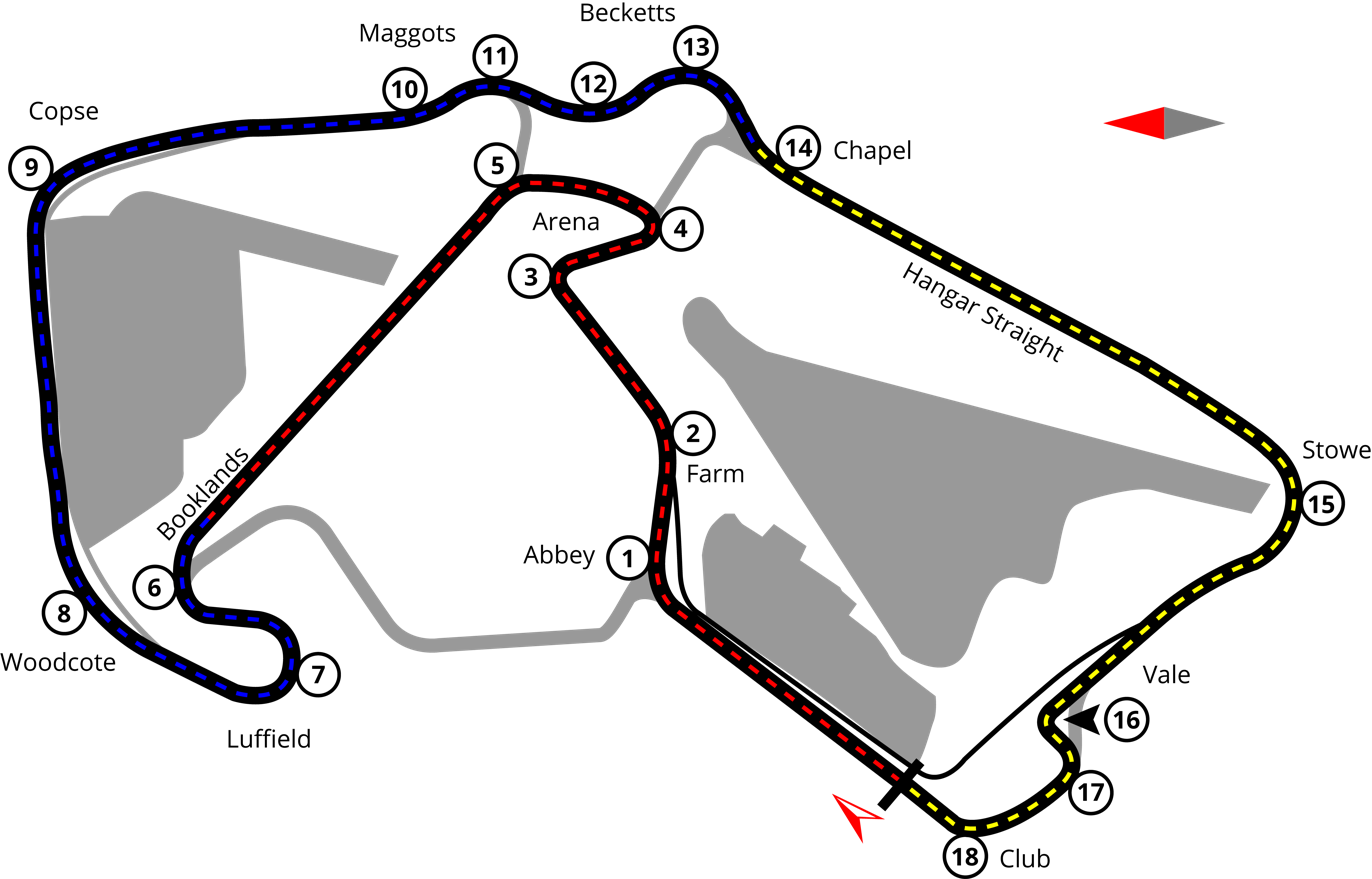
The Silverstone Circuit

The 2013 3 Hours of Silverstone was an auto racing event held at the Silverstone Circuit near Silverstone, England, on 12–13 April 2013. The event was the opening round of the 2013 European Le Mans Series season, in a weekend shared with the FIA World Endurance Championship and the FIA European Formula 3 Championship. Heavy rains during the race forced the event to be cut short, with only two and a quarter hours being run before Britons Simon Dolan and Oliver Turvey of Jota Sport were declared the winners. Soheil Ayari and Anthony Pons led the LMPC category, Christian Ried, Gianluca Roda, and Nick Tandy won the LMGTE class, and Andrew Smith, Ollie Millroy, and Alisdair McCaig were the GTC class victors.

== Qualifying ==
=== Qualifying result ===
Pole position winners in each class are marked in bold.

Pos	Class	Team	Driver	Lap Time	Grid
1	**LMP2**	**No. 38 Jota Sport**	**Oliver Turvey**	**1:48.032**	1
2	LMP2	No. 18 Murphy Prototypes	Brendon Hartley	1:48.863	2
3	LMP2	No. 36 Signatech Alpine	Nelson Panciatici	1:49.063	3
4	LMP2	No. 34 Race Performance	Patric Niederhauser	1:50.010	4
5	LMP2	No. 43 Morand Racing	Franck Mailleux	1:50.139	5
6	LMP2	No. 1 Thiriet by TDS Racing	Jonathan Hirschi	1:50.157	6
7	LMP2	No. 4 Boutsen Ginion Racing	Bastien Brière	1:52.072	7
8	LMP2	No. 3 Greaves Motorsport	Chris Dyson	1:52.529	23^{1}
9	**LMPC**	**No. 49 Team Endurance Challenge**	**Paul-Loup Chatin**	**1:54.102**	8
10	LMPC	No. 48 Team Endurance Challenge	Soheil Ayari	1:54.721	9
11	LMP2	No. 39 DKR Engineering	Olivier Porta	1:55.634	10
12	LMPC	No. 47 Team Endurance Challenge	Alex Loan	1:58.310	11
13	**LMGTE**	**No. 52 RAM Racing**	**Johnny Mowlem**	**2:02.358**	12
14	LMGTE	No. 77 Proton Competition	Nick Tandy	2:02.653	13
15	LMGTE	No. 75 Prospeed Competition	Emmanuel Collard	2:02.685	14
16	LMGTE	No. 55 AF Corse	Federico Leo	2:02.731	15
17	LMGTE	No. 66 JMW Motorsport	Joël Camathias	2:03.015	16
18	**GTC**	**No. 65 Momo Megatron DF1**	**Kuba Giermaziak**	**2:03.484**	17
19	GTC	No. 79 Ecurie Ecosse	Andrew Smith	2:03.737	18
20	GTC	No. 62 AF Corse	Lorenzo Casé	2:04.233	19
21	LMGTE	No. 53 RAM Racing	Franck Montecalvo	2:04.412	20
22	LMGTE	No. 54 AF Corse	Yannick Mollégol	2:05.198	21
23	LMGTE	No. 67 IMSA Performance Matmut	Patrice Milesi	2:08.745	22

- **^1** - The No. 3 Greaves Motorsport Zytek-Nissan was moved to the back of the grid for not using the tires previously allocated for qualifying.

== Race ==
=== Race result ===
Class winners in bold. Cars failing to complete 70% of winner's distance marked as Not Classified (NC).

Pos	Class	No	Team	Drivers	Chassis	Tyre	Laps
Pos	Class	No	Team	Drivers	Engine	Tyre	Laps
1	**LMP2**	**38**	**(United Kingdom) Jota Sport**	**(United Kingdom) Simon Dolan (United Kingdom) Oliver Turvey**	**Zytek Z11SN**	D	**48**
1	**LMP2**	**38**	**(United Kingdom) Jota Sport**	**(United Kingdom) Simon Dolan (United Kingdom) Oliver Turvey**	**Nissan VK45DE 4.5 L V8**	D	**48**
2	LMP2	34	(Switzerland) Race Performance	(Switzerland) Michel Frey (Switzerland) Patric Niederhauser	Oreca 03	D	48
2	LMP2	34	(Switzerland) Race Performance	(Switzerland) Michel Frey (Switzerland) Patric Niederhauser	Judd HK 3.6 L V8	D	48
3	LMP2	1	(France) Thiriet by TDS Racing	(France) Pierre Thiriet (Switzerland) Jonathan Hirschi	Oreca 03	D	48
3	LMP2	1	(France) Thiriet by TDS Racing	(France) Pierre Thiriet (Switzerland) Jonathan Hirschi	Nissan VK45DE 4.5 L V8	D	48
4	LMP2	36	(France) Signatech Alpine	(France) Pierre Ragues (France) Nelson Panciatici	Alpine A450	M	48
4	LMP2	36	(France) Signatech Alpine	(France) Pierre Ragues (France) Nelson Panciatici	Nissan VK45DE 4.5 L V8	M	48
5	**LMGTE**	**77**	**(Germany) Proton Competition**	**(Germany) Christian Ried (Italy) Gianluca Roda (United Kingdom) Nick Tandy**	**Porsche 997 GT3-RSR**	M	**48**
5	**LMGTE**	**77**	**(Germany) Proton Competition**	**(Germany) Christian Ried (Italy) Gianluca Roda (United Kingdom) Nick Tandy**	**Porsche M97/74 4.0 L Flat-6**	M	**48**
6	LMGTE	52	(United Kingdom) Ram Racing	(United Kingdom) Johnny Mowlem (Republic of Ireland) Matt Griffin	Ferrari 458 Italia GT2	M	47
6	LMGTE	52	(United Kingdom) Ram Racing	(United Kingdom) Johnny Mowlem (Republic of Ireland) Matt Griffin	Ferrari F136 4.5 L V8	M	47
7	LMGTE	53	(United Kingdom) Ram Racing	(United States) Gunnar Jeannette (United States) Frankie Montecalvo	Ferrari 458 Italia GT2	M	47
7	LMGTE	53	(United Kingdom) Ram Racing	(United States) Gunnar Jeannette (United States) Frankie Montecalvo	Ferrari F136 4.5 L V8	M	47
8	LMGTE	66	(United Kingdom) JMW Motorsport	(Italy) Andrea Bertolini (Switzerland) Joël Camathias	Ferrari 458 Italia GT2	D	47
8	LMGTE	66	(United Kingdom) JMW Motorsport	(Italy) Andrea Bertolini (Switzerland) Joël Camathias	Ferrari F136 4.5 L V8	D	47
9	**LMPC**	**48**	**(France) Team Endurance Challenge**	**(France) Soheil Ayari (France) Anthony Pons**	**Oreca FLM09**	M	**46**
9	**LMPC**	**48**	**(France) Team Endurance Challenge**	**(France) Soheil Ayari (France) Anthony Pons**	**Chevrolet LS3 6.2 L V8**	M	**46**
10	**GTC**	**79**	**(United Kingdom) Ecurie Ecosse**	**(United Kingdom) Andrew Smith (United Kingdom) Ollie Millroy (United Kingdom) Alisdair McCaig**	**BMW Z4 GT3**	M	**46**
10	**GTC**	**79**	**(United Kingdom) Ecurie Ecosse**	**(United Kingdom) Andrew Smith (United Kingdom) Ollie Millroy (United Kingdom) Alisdair McCaig**	**BMW P65B44 4.4 L V8**	M	**46**
11	LMP2	4	(Belgium) Boutsen Ginion Racing	(France) Bastien Brière (France) Thomas Dagoneau (United Kingdom) John Hartshorne	Oreca 03	D	46
11	LMP2	4	(Belgium) Boutsen Ginion Racing	(France) Bastien Brière (France) Thomas Dagoneau (United Kingdom) John Hartshorne	Nissan VK45DE 4.5 L V8	D	46
12	LMGTE	75	(Belgium) Prospeed Competition	(France) François Perrodo (France) Emmanuel Collard (France) Sébastien Crubilé	Porsche 997 GT3-RSR	M	46
12	LMGTE	75	(Belgium) Prospeed Competition	(France) François Perrodo (France) Emmanuel Collard (France) Sébastien Crubilé	Porsche M97/74 4.0 L Flat-6	M	46
13	GTC	62	(Italy) AF Corse	(France) Andrea Razzoli (Italy) Stefano Gai (Italy) Lorenzo Casè	Ferrari 458 Italia GT2	M	46
13	GTC	62	(Italy) AF Corse	(France) Andrea Razzoli (Italy) Stefano Gai (Italy) Lorenzo Casè	Ferrari F136 4.5 L V8	M	46
14	LMGTE	67	(France) IMSA Performance Matmut	(France) Patrice Milesi (France) Raymond Narac (Germany) Wolf Henzler	Porsche 997 GT3-RSR	M	44
14	LMGTE	67	(France) IMSA Performance Matmut	(France) Patrice Milesi (France) Raymond Narac (Germany) Wolf Henzler	Porsche M97/74 4.0 L Flat-6	M	44
15	LMP2	39	(Luxembourg) DKR Engineering	(France) Olivier Porta (France) Romain Brandela (France) Stéphane Raffin	Lola B11/40	D	43
15	LMP2	39	(Luxembourg) DKR Engineering	(France) Olivier Porta (France) Romain Brandela (France) Stéphane Raffin	Judd HK 3.6 L V8	D	43
16	LMGTE	55	(Italy) AF Corse	(Italy) Piergiuseppe Perazzini (Italy) Marco Cioci (Italy) Federico Leo	Ferrari 458 Italia GT2	M	43
16	LMGTE	55	(Italy) AF Corse	(Italy) Piergiuseppe Perazzini (Italy) Marco Cioci (Italy) Federico Leo	Ferrari F136 4.5 L V8	M	43
17	LMGTE	54	(Italy) AF Corse	(France) Yannick Mollégol (France) Jean-Marc Bachelier (United States) Howard Blank	Ferrari 458 Italia GT2	M	42
17	LMGTE	54	(Italy) AF Corse	(France) Yannick Mollégol (France) Jean-Marc Bachelier (United States) Howard Blank	Ferrari F136 4.5 L V8	M	42
18	LMP2	18	(Republic of Ireland) Murphy Prototypes	(New Zealand) Brendon Hartley (United States) Mark Patterson	Oreca 03	D	41
18	LMP2	18	(Republic of Ireland) Murphy Prototypes	(New Zealand) Brendon Hartley (United States) Mark Patterson	Nissan VK45DE 4.5 L V8	D	41
19	LMPC	49	(France) Team Endurance Challenge	(France) Paul-Loup Chatin (Switzerland) Gary Hirsch	Oreca FLM09	M	37
19	LMPC	49	(France) Team Endurance Challenge	(France) Paul-Loup Chatin (Switzerland) Gary Hirsch	Chevrolet LS3 6.2 L V8	M	37
20	GTC	65	(United States) Momo Megatron DF1	(Belgium) Dylan Derdaele (Switzerland) Raffi Bader (Poland) Kuba Giermaziak	Audi R8 LMS ultra	M	33
20	GTC	65	(United States) Momo Megatron DF1	(Belgium) Dylan Derdaele (Switzerland) Raffi Bader (Poland) Kuba Giermaziak	Audi DAR 5.2 L V10	M	33
DNF	LMP2	3	(United Kingdom) Greaves Motorsport	(United States) Chris Dyson (United States) Michael Marsal	Zytek Z11SN	D	23
DNF	LMP2	3	(United Kingdom) Greaves Motorsport	(United States) Chris Dyson (United States) Michael Marsal	Nissan VK45DE 4.5 L V8	D	23
DNF	LMP2	43	(Switzerland) Morand Racing	(Switzerland) Natacha Gachnang (France) Franck Mailleux	Morgan LMP2	D	22
DNF	LMP2	43	(Switzerland) Morand Racing	(Switzerland) Natacha Gachnang (France) Franck Mailleux	Judd HK 3.6 L V8	D	22
DNF	LMPC	47	(France) Team Endurance Challenge	(Andorra) Alex Loan (France) Matthieu Lecuyer	Oreca FLM09	M	0
DNF	LMPC	47	(France) Team Endurance Challenge	(Andorra) Alex Loan (France) Matthieu Lecuyer	Chevrolet LS3 6.2 L V8	M	0

European Le Mans Series
Previous race: none	2013 season	Next race: 3 Hours of Imola
