= Natacha Gachnang =

Swiss racing driver

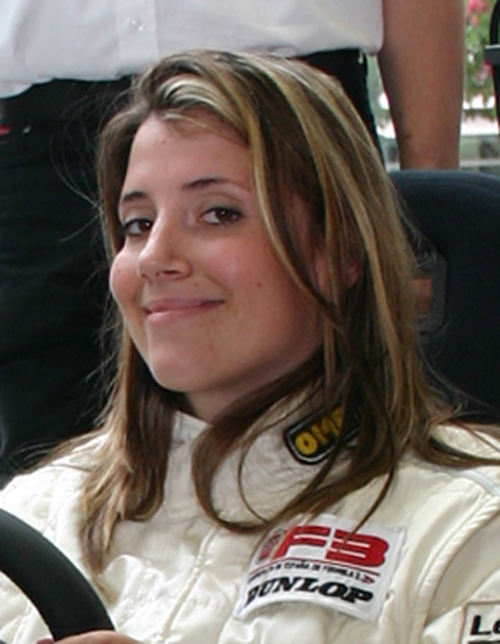
- Gachnang in 2008
- Nationality: (Switzerland) Swiss
- Born: 27 October 1987 (age 39) Vevey, Switzerland
- Relatives: Sébastien Buemi (cousin)

FIA Formula Two Championship career
- Debut season: 2009
- Current team: MotorSport Vision
- Categorisation: FIA Gold (until 2012); FIA Silver (2013–)
- Car number: 18
- Starts: 16
- Wins: 0
- Poles: 0
- Fastest laps: 0
- Best finish: 23rd in 2009

Natacha Gachnang (born 27 October 1987 in Vevey, Switzerland) is a Swiss race driver and the cousin of former Formula One driver Sébastien Buemi. In 2010, she was a member of the first all-female crew to race at Le Mans 24 hours since 1991, and she competed at Le Mans again in 2013.

== Career ==
- 2001 Swiss junior karting champion.
- 2002 Formula BMW ADAC Meisterschaft test – fourth of 64 drivers.
- 2003 Formula BMW ADAC Meisterschaft – one fourth-place finish.
- 2004 Formula BMW ADAC Meisterschaft – two fourth-place finishes.
- 2005 Formula BMW ADAC Meisterschaft – sixth, three podiums.
- 2006 Formula 3 Cup – one podium, nine top-ten finishes.
- 2007 Star Mazda 3- two podiums.
- 2007/2008 A1 Grand Prix - Rookie driver for Switzerland (Brno)

On 17 December 2008, it was announced Gachnang would be the first female to drive in the new Formula One feeder series FIA Formula Two Championship. She finished 23rd in the campaign, scoring two points.

- 2008 Spanish Formula 3 - four podiums.
- 2009 Formula 2 - one top-ten finish.

For the 2010 season, Gachnang teamed up with Cyndie Allemann and raced for the Swiss Matech team in a GT1 class Ford GT in the FIA GT1 World Championship. During qualifying for the first round of the championship in Abu Dhabi, she crashed heavily, breaking her right tibia.

Gachnang returned to racing in the 24 Hours of Le Mans, with Gachnang and Allemann being joined by fellow Swiss Rahel Frey. This marked the first time since 1991, with Lyn St. James, Desire Wilson and Cathy Muller, that an all-female team competed at Le Mans.

== Racing record ==
=== Career summary ===
Season	Series	Team	Races	Wins	Poles	F/Laps	Podiums	Points	Position
2003	Formula BMW ADAC	Privateer	20	0	0	0	0	13	19th
2004	Formula BMW ADAC	AM-Holzer Rennsport GmbH	19	0	0	0	0	37	12th
2005	Formula BMW ADAC	Josef Kaufmann Racing	20	0	0	0	3	90	6th
2006	German Formula 3 Championship - Cup	Bordoli Motorsport	14	0	0	0	1	11	13th
2006	German Formula 3 Championship - Trophy	Bordoli Motorsport	4	0	0	0	2	17	11th
2006	Österreichische Rennwagen Meisterschaft	Bordoli Motorsport	2	1	0	0	2	35	4th
2006	Formula 3 Euro Series	Bordoli Motorsport	3	0	0	0	0	0	24th
2006	Formula 3 Euro Series	Jo Zeller Racing	4	0	0	0	0	0	24th
2007	Star Mazda Championship	AIM Autosport	7	0	0	?	2	217	15th
2007	Atlantic Championship	Paladin Motorsports	0	0	0	0	0	0	34th
2008	Spanish Formula 3 Championship - Class A	Campos F3 Racing	17	0	1	2	4	76	**3rd**
2008	Spanish Formula 3 Championship - Copa F300	Campos F3 Racing	17	5	3	6	12	110	**1st**
2009	FIA Formula Two Championship	MotorSport Vision	16	0	0	0	0	2	23rd
2009	Formula Le Mans Cup	Hope Polevision Racing	7	0	1	0	2	52	10th
2009	Radical European Masters	Hope Polevision Racing	8	1	1	4	8	133	5th
2010	Auto GP	Charouz-Gravity Racing	6	0	0	0	0	1	21st
2010	FIA GT1 World Championship	Matech Competition	2	0	0	0	0	0	60th
2010	Le Mans 24 Hours - LMGT1	Matech Competition	1	0	0	0	0	N/A	DNF
2011	V de V Challenge Endurance Proto	Équipe Palmyr	1	0	?	?	0	5	44th
2012	VLN Series	Toyota Swiss Racing Team	3	0	0	?	?	10	507th
2012	24 Hours of Nürburgring - V3	Toyota Swiss Racing Team	1	1	1	1	1	N/A	**1st**
2013	European Le Mans Series	Morand Racing	5	0	0	0	3	58	7th
2013	24 Hours of Le Mans - LMP2	Morand Racing	1	0	0	0	0	N/A	5th
2015	V de V Challenge Endurance Proto	Équipe Palmyr	4	0	0	0	2	83.5	11th

=== Complete Formula 3 Euro Series results ===
(key)

Year	Entrant	Chassis	Engine	1	2	3	4	5	6	7	8	9	10	11	12	13	14	15	16	17	18	19	20	DC	Points
2006	Bordoli Motorsport	Dallara F305/026	Opel	HOC1; 1	HOC1; 2	LAU; 1	LAU; 2	OSC; 1	OSC; 2	BRH; 1	BRH; 2	NOR; 1; 15	NOR; 2 DNS	NÜR; 1; 23	NÜR; 2; 15	ZAN; 1	ZAN; 2	CAT; 1	CAT; 2					24th	0
2006	Jo Zeller Racing	Dallara F306/014	Opel																	LMS; 1; 12	LMS; 2 Ret	HOC2; 1; 13	HOC2; 2; 10	24th	0

=== Complete FIA Formula Two Championship results ===
(key) (Races in bold indicate pole position) (Races in italics indicate fastest lap)

Year	1	2	3	4	5	6	7	8	9	10	11	12	13	14	15	16	DC	Points
2009	VAL; 1; 11	VAL; 2 Ret	BRN; 1; 14	BRN; 2 Ret	SPA; 1; 11	SPA; 2; 13	BRH; 1; 14	BRH; 2; 15	DON; 1; 13	DON; 2 Ret	OSC; 1; 11	OSC; 2; 12	IMO; 1; 15	IMO; 2 Ret	CAT; 1; 7	CAT; 2; 13	23rd	2

=== Complete Auto GP Results ===
(key)

Year	Entrant	1	2	3	4	5	6	7	8	9	10	11	12	Pos	Points
2010	Charouz-Gravity Racing	BRN; 1	BRN; 2	IMO; 1	IMO; 2	SPA; 1; 12	SPA; 2; 11	MAG; 1	MAG; 2	NAV; 1; 8	NAV; 2; 7	MNZ; 1; 15	MNZ; 2; 10	21st	1

=== Complete GT1 World Championship results ===
Year	Team	Car	1	2	3	4	5	6	7	8	9	10	11	12	13	14	15	16	17	18	19	20	Pos	Points
2010	Matech Competition	Ford	ABU; QR; DNS	ABU; CR; DNS	SIL; QR	SIL; CR	BRN; QR	BRN; CR	PRI; QR; 18	PRI; CR; Ret	SPA; QR	SPA; CR	NÜR; QR	NÜR; CR	ALG; QR	ALG; CR	NAV; QR	NAV; CR	INT; QR	INT; CR	SAN; QR	SAN; CR	60th	0

=== Complete 24 Hours of Le Mans results ===
Year	Team	Co-Drivers	Car	Class	Laps	Pos.	Class Pos.
2010	(Switzerland) Matech Competition	(Switzerland) Cyndie Allemann (Switzerland) Rahel Frey	Ford GT1	GT1	59	DNF	DNF
2013	(Switzerland) Morand Racing	(France) Franck Mailleux (France) Olivier Lombard	Morgan LMP2-Judd	LMP2	320	11th	5th

=== Complete European Le Mans Series results ===
(key) (Races in bold indicate pole position; results in italics indicate fastest lap)

Year	Entrant	Class	Chassis	Engine	1	2	3	4	5	Rank	Points
2013	Morand Racing	LMP2	Morgan LMP2	Judd HK 3.6 L V8	SIL; Ret	IMO; 3	RBR; 3	HUN; 5	LEC; 2	7th	58

Sporting positions
Preceded by Christian Ebbesvik	Spanish Formula Three; Copa de España; Champion; 2008	Succeeded by Callum MacLeod
