= Federico Leo =

Italian racing driver (born 1988)

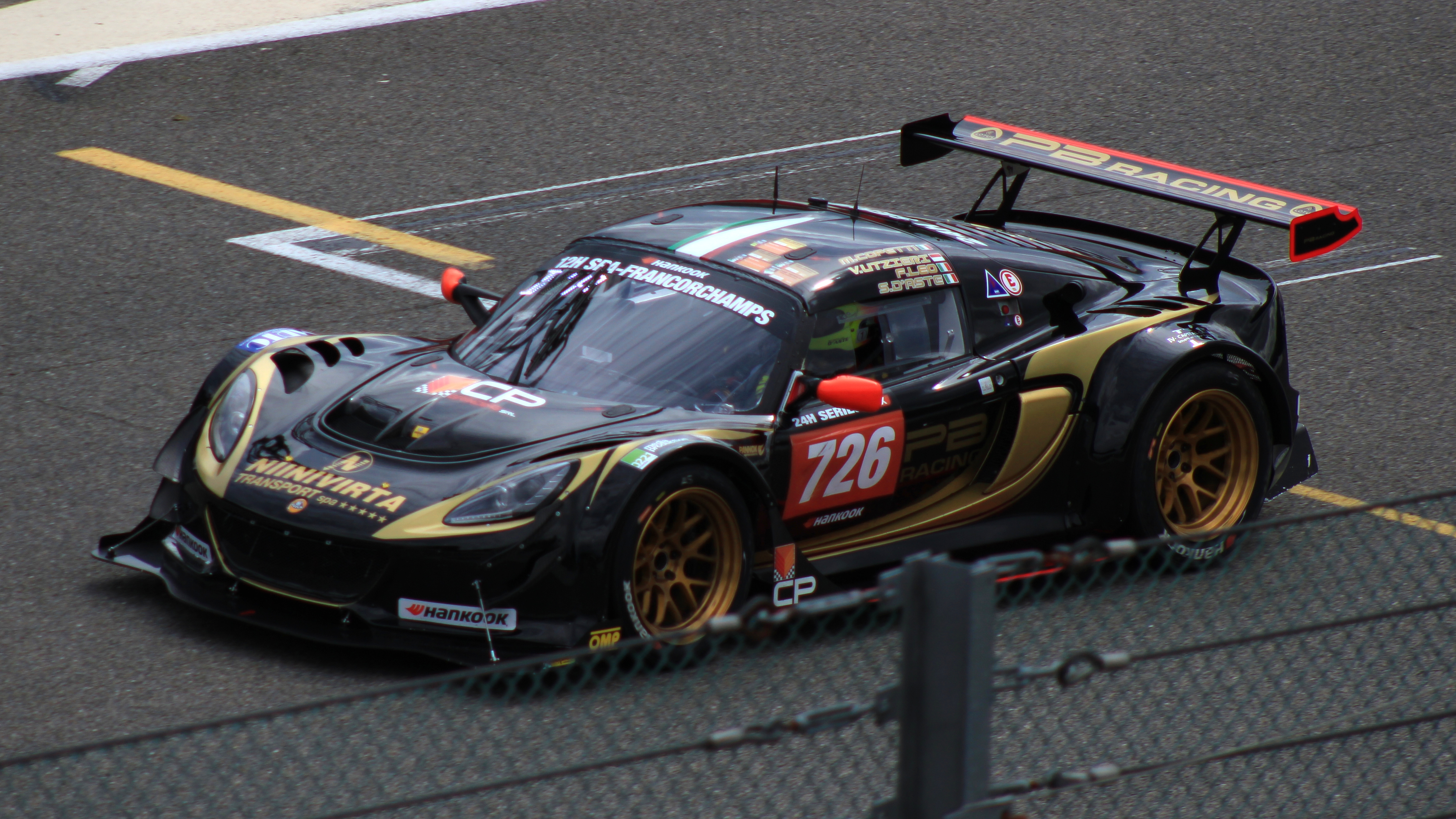
- Federico driving for Lotus PB Racing at the Spa-Francorchamps in 2023
- Nationality: (Italy) Italian
- Born: August 27, 1988 (age 38) Varese (Italy)

FIA GT3 European Championship career
- Debut season: 2011
- Current team: Ombra Racing
- Categorisation: FIA Silver (until 2013, 2019–); FIA Gold (2014–2018)
- Car number: 50
- Starts: 11
- Wins: 1
- Poles: 3
- Fastest laps: 0
- Best finish: 1st in 2011

Previous series
- 2010 2010 2010 2009–10 2008 2008 2006–07 2005–06: GP2 Series; Le Mans Series; Auto GP; Formula Renault 3.5 Series; British Formula 3 German Formula Three; Italian Formula Renault 2.0; Italian Formula Junior 1600

Championship titles
- 2011: FIA GT3 European Championship

Federico Leo (born August 27, 1988, in Varese) is an Italian racing driver.

== Career ==
=== Formula Junior ===
Leo began his single–seater career in late 2005 in the Italian Formula Junior 1600 Winter series, scoring nine points to finish 13th in the standings. The following year, he took part in a full season in the category, recording one podium finish to be classified in 12th place.

=== Formula Renault 2.0 ===
At the end of the 2006 season, Leo took part in the Italian Formula Renault 2.0 Winter series for RP Motorsport, finishing in 15th place. In 2007, he continued with the team into the main championship, although he failed to score a point in the fourteen races he contested.

=== Formula Three ===
In 2008, Leo stepped up to the German Formula Three Championship with the Italian Ombra Racing team. He finished ninth in the standings after taking a single podium place in the opening round at Hockenheim. He also made a one–off appearance in the British Formula 3 Championship round at Monza in May. After starting both races from the back of the grid, he finished 14th in race one before retiring from the second race.

=== Formula Renault 3.5 Series ===
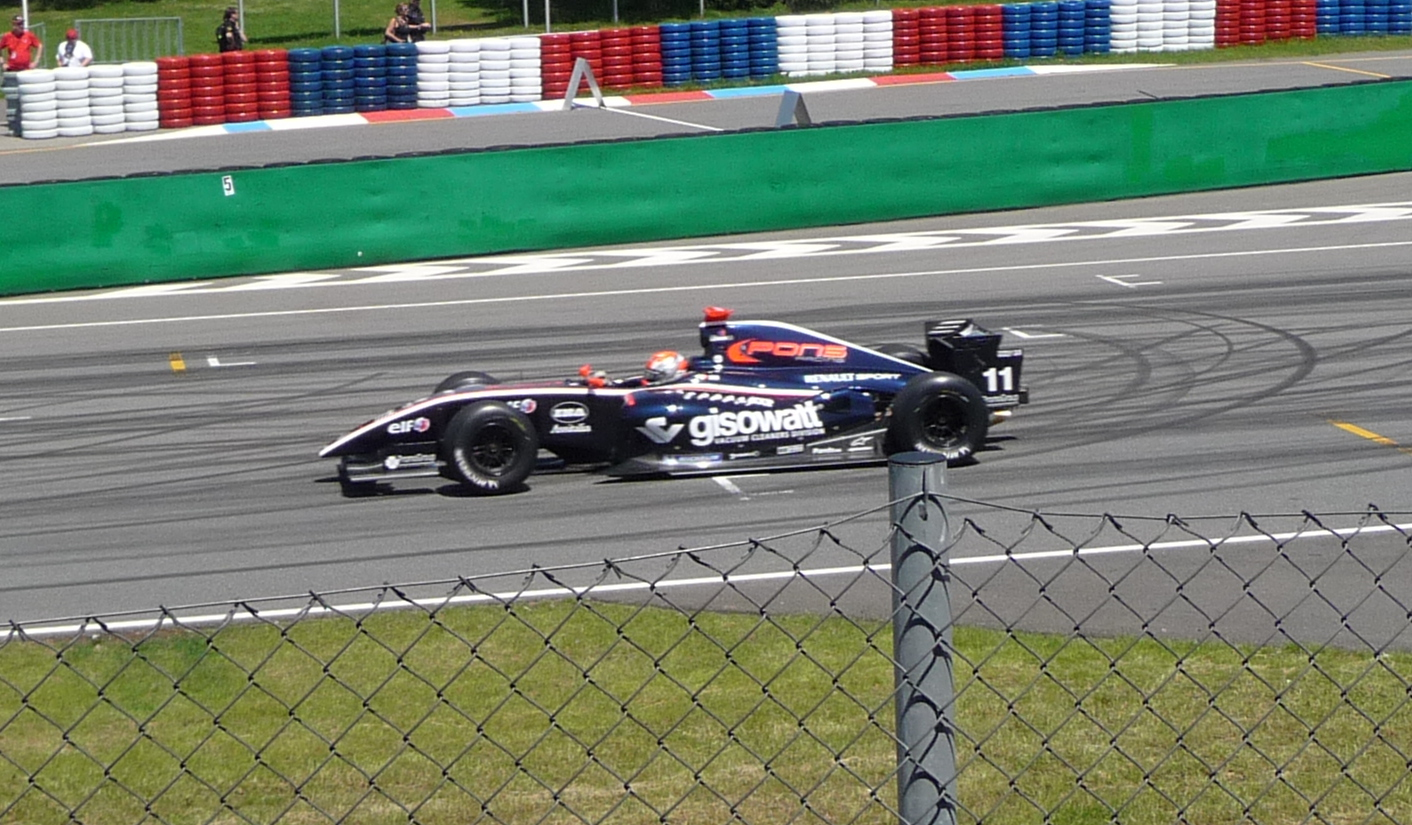
Leo at the 2010 Brno World Series by Renault meeting

At the end of 2008, Leo took part in Formula Renault 3.5 Series collective testing at Paul Ricard and Valencia. After testing for both RC Motorsport and Pons Racing, Leo signed with the latter to contest the 2009 season, alongside Spaniard Marcos Martínez. He scored eight points over the course of the 17–race season, with those points coming at the final round of the campaign at the new Motorland Aragón circuit with a pair of seventh-place finishes.

During the off–season Leo tested with several different teams, including Fortec Motorsport and Draco Racing, but remained with Pons Racing for a second season in 2010. After scoring a fifth place in the opening round at Motorland Aragón, Leo took just three more points finishes and was classified in 17th place, tied on 16 points with both Walter Grubmüller and Jan Charouz.

=== Auto GP ===
In May 2010, Leo made his debut in the new Auto GP championship at Imola, replacing Adrian Zaugg at the Trident Racing team. After finishing in ninth place in the feature race, Leo took fifth place in the sprint event after surviving a startline accident that eliminated six cars. In October 2010, Leo rejoined the team for the final round of the season at Monza, finishing the two races in fifth and seventh places respectively to be classified 16th in the final standings.

=== Sportscars ===
In April 2010, Leo tested a Lola B08/80 LMP2 car at Vallelunga for the Italian Racing Box team, and on August 2010, it was announced that he would join the team for the Le Mans Series round at the Hungaroring, the penultimate round of the season. He stayed with the team for the final round of the year at Silverstone, where he and teammates Fabio Babini and Ferdinando Geri finished 13th overall and fifth in the LMP2 class. He was classified 17th in the final LMP2 standings.

For 2011, Leo raced in the FIA GT3 European Championship with AF Corse, sharing a Ferrari 458 with fellow Italian driver Francesco Castellacci. The duo won the drivers' title at the final round of the season in Zandvoort, finishing nine points clear of the Graff Racing entry of Mike Parisy.

=== GP2 Series ===
Leo made his GP2 Series début at the final round of the 2010 season in Abu Dhabi, replacing Edoardo Piscopo at the Trident Racing team. He finished the feature race in 19th place, but retired from the sprint event.

== Racing record ==
=== Career summary ===
Season	Series	Team	Races	Wins	Poles	F/Laps	Podiums	Points	Position
2005	Italian Formula Junior 1600 – Winter Series	Tomcat Racing	4	0	0	0	0	9	13th
2006	Italian Formula Junior 1600	Emmegi Promotion	12	0	0	0	1	50	12th
2006	Italian Formula Renault 2.0 – Winter Series	RP Motorsport	4	0	0	0	0	14	15th
2007	Italian Formula Renault 2.0	RP Motorsport	14	0	0	0	0	0	NC
2008	German Formula Three Championship	Ombra Racing	17	0	0	0	1	23	9th
2008	British Formula 3 International Series	Ombra Racing	2	0	0	0	0	0	NC†
2009	Formula Renault 3.5 Series	Pons Racing	17	0	0	0	0	8	21st
2010	Formula Renault 3.5 Series	Pons Racing	17	0	0	0	0	16	17th
2010	Auto GP	Trident Racing	4	0	0	0	0	6	16th
2010	Le Mans Series - LMP2	Racing Box	2	0	0	0	0	13	17th
2010	GP2 Series	Trident Racing	2	0	0	0	0	0	32nd
2011	FIA GT3 European Championship	AF Corse	11	1	3	0	4	111	**1st**
2012	International GT Open - Super GT	AF Corse	16	3	1	2	7	85	**1st**
2012	International GT Open	AF Corse	16	3	1	2	7	195	**1st**
2013	European Le Mans Series - GTE	AF Corse	5	0	0	0	2	63	5th
2013	International GT Open - GTS	AF Corse	2	0	0	0	0	0	NC
2013	FIA GT Series - Gentlemens Trophy	AF Corse	2	2	1	2	2	0	NC
2013	Spanish GT Championship - GTS	AF Corse	2	0	0	0	0	0	NC
2014	International GT Open - GTS	AF Corse	8	0	1	0	2	12	20th
2014	FIA World Endurance Championship - LMGTE Pro	Ram Racing	1	0	0	0	0	0	NC
2014	24 Hours of Le Mans - LMGTE Pro	Ram Racing	1	0	0	0	0	0	NC
2015	Renault Sport Trophy - Endurance	V8 Racing	2	0	0	0	0	1	24th
2015	Renault Sport Trophy - Elite	V8 Racing	2	0	0	0	0	10	14th
2016	Italian GT Championship - GT3	Scuderia Baldini 27 Network	13	3	3	0	10	156	**1st**
2017	Italian GT Championship - Super GT3 Pro	Petri Corse Motorsport	6	0	0	0	1	45	14th
2018	Blancpain GT Series Endurance Cup	Daiko Lazarus Racing	3	0	0	0	0	0	NC
2019	International GT Open	Ombra Racing	12	0	0	0	0	3	30th
2020	Ligier European Series - JS P4	Monza Garage	2	0	1	1	2	30	6th
2021	International GT Open - Pro	Vincenzo Sospiri Racing	2	0	0	0	0	6	15th
2021	Italian GT Sprint Championship - GT3 Pro-Am	Vincenzo Sospiri Racing	2	0	0	0	0	0	NC
2023	24H GT Series - GTX	Lotus PB Racing	1	0	0	0	0	38	NC

† – As Leo was a guest driver, he was ineligible for championship points.

=== Complete Formula Renault 3.5 Series results ===
(key) (Races in bold indicate pole position) (Races in italics indicate fastest lap)

Year	Team	1	2	3	4	5	6	7	8	9	10	11	12	13	14	15	16	17	Pos	Points
2009	Pons Racing	CAT; 1; 19	CAT; 2; 18	SPA; 1; 17	SPA; 2; 17	MON; 1; 18	HUN; 1 Ret	HUN; 2; 14	SIL; 1; 15	SIL; 2; 21	BUG; 1; 18	BUG; 2 Ret	ALG; 1; 13	ALG; 2; 19	NÜR; 1; 18	NÜR; 2; 17	ALC; 1; 7	ALC; 2; 7	21st	8
2010	Pons Racing	ALC; 1 Ret	ALC; 2; 5	SPA; 1; 6	SPA; 2; 17	MON; 1 Ret	BRN; 1 Ret	BRN; 2; 18	MAG; 1 Ret	MAG; 2 Ret	HUN; 1 Ret	HUN; 2; 17	HOC; 1; 16	HOC; 2; 10	SIL; 1; 11	SIL; 2; 18	CAT; 1; 7	CAT; 2; 15	17th	16

=== 24 Hours of Le Mans results ===
Year	Team	Co-Drivers	Car	Class	Laps	Pos.	Class Pos.
2014	(United Kingdom) Ram Racing	(Republic of Ireland) Matt Griffin (Portugal) Álvaro Parente	Ferrari 458 Italia GTC	GTE; Pro	140	DNF	DNF

Sporting positions
Preceded by Christian Hohenadel; Daniel Keilwitz	FIA GT3 European Champion; 2011 with: Francesco Castellacci	Succeeded by Dominik Baumann; Maximilian Buhk
Preceded by Soheil Ayari	International GT Open champion 2012 with: Gianmaria Bruni	Succeeded by Andrea Montermini
