= BMW S65 =

BMW S65 Engine
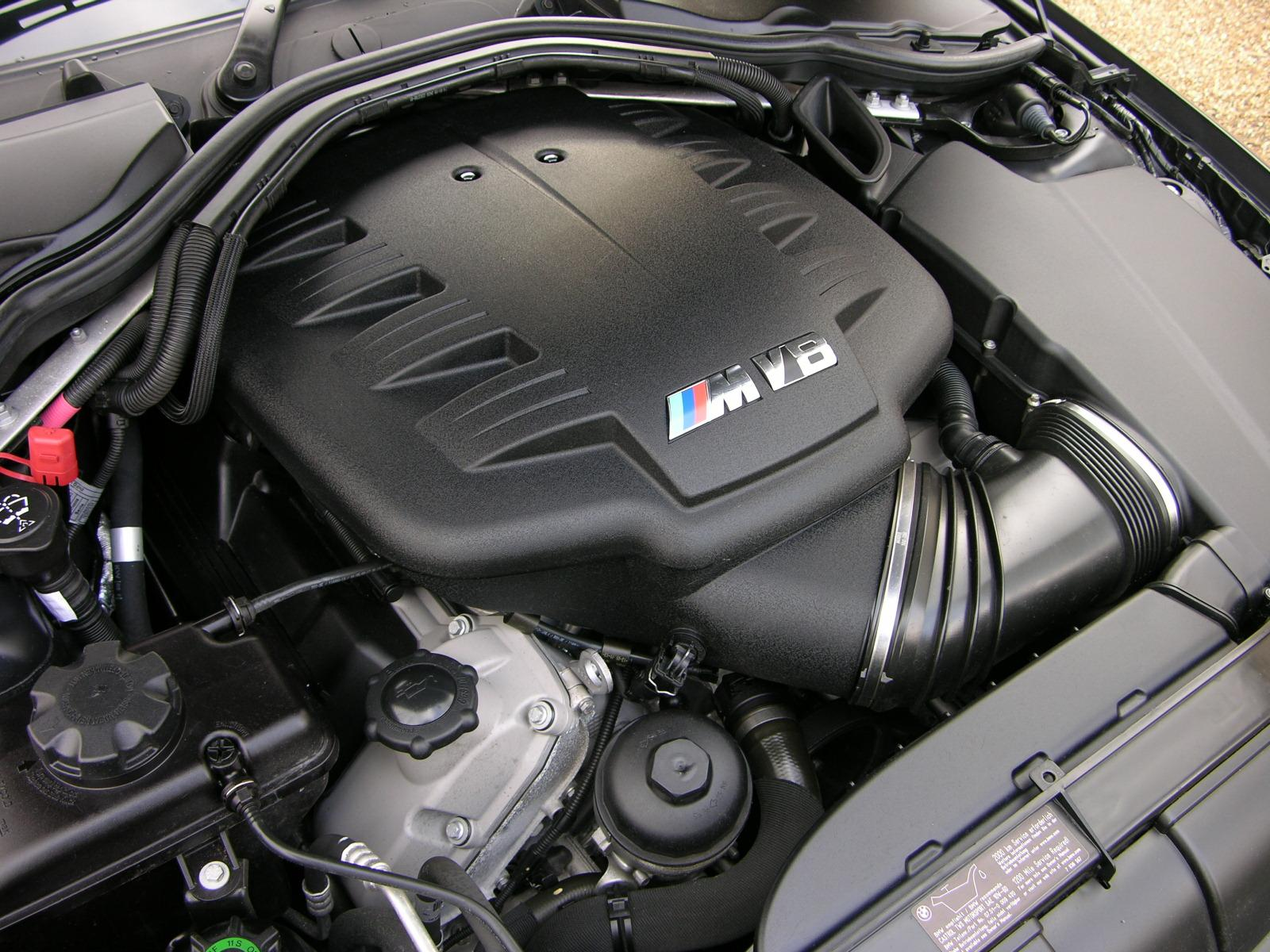
- S65B40 in a E93 M3

Overview
- Manufacturer: (Germany) BMW
- Production: 2007–2013

Layout
- Configuration: 90° V8
- Displacement: 4.0 L (3,999 cc); 4.4 L (4,361 cc)
- Cylinder bore: 92 mm (3.62 in)
- Piston stroke: 75.2 mm (2.96 in); 82 mm (3.2 in)
- Cylinder block material: Aluminium
- Cylinder head material: Aluminium
- Valvetrain: DOHC w/ VVT

Combustion
- Fuel system: Electronic multi-point fuel injection
- Fuel type: Petrol
- Oil system: Wet sump

Chronology
- Predecessor: BMW S54 (in E46 M3)
- Successor: BMW S55 (in F80 M3)

The BMW S65 is a naturally aspirated V8 petrol engine which was produced from 2007 to 2013. Its main use was in the BMW M3 (where it replaced the BMW S54 straight-six engine). There is no direct replacement for the S65, since the following generation of M3 switched to a turbocharged straight-six engine (the BMW S55).

Derived from the BMW S85 V10 engine (as used in the E60 M5), the S65 shares the same basic architecture and aluminium construction. Unlike most other BMW M engines, the S65 and S85 are not related to a regular production BMW engine.

The S65 won the International Engine of the Year award for the 3.0 to 4.0 L category in 2008, 2009, 2010, 2011 and 2012.

== Design ==
The S65 shares the same cylinder dimensions with the S85 V10, with a 92 mm (3.6 in) bore and a 75.2 mm (3.0 in) stroke. Other common features include individual throttle bodies, ionic current knock sensing, double-VANOS (variable valve timing) and the 12.0:1 compression ratio. The redline is 8,400 rpm.

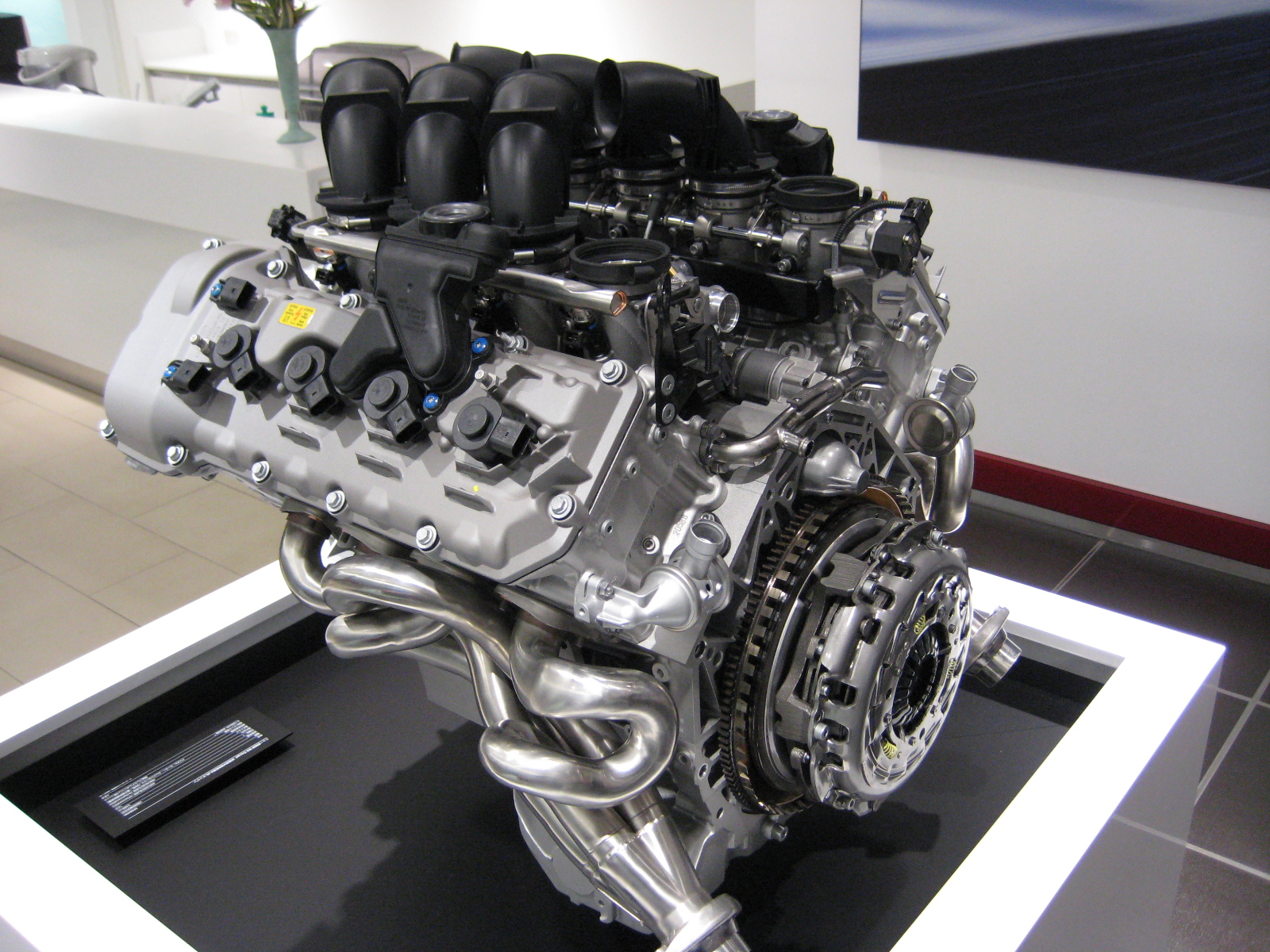
S65 engine with the top plastic air plenum removed to reveal the 8 individual throttle bodies.

To reduce weight, a wet-sump lubrication system with two electrically operated scavenging pumps and a main oil pump replaces the three-pump wet-sump system used on the S85. The dry weight of the S65 is 202 kg (445 lb).

The alternator reduces or stops charging (depending on battery charge level) during acceleration to maximise power, only fully charging the battery during braking and decelerating whenever possible, in a system BMW calls Brake Energy Regeneration.

The engine control unit (ECU/DME) is a Siemens MSS60, which is based on the Siemens MSS65 ECU used in the S85 engine The S65 weighs 202 kg (445 lb), which is 15 kg (33 lb) less than its S54 straight-6 engine predecessor.

The firing order for the S65 engine is 1-5-4-8-7-2-6-3, which is different from the typical BMW V8 firing order of 1-5-4-8-6-3-7-2.

== Versions ==
Engine	Displacement	Power	Torque	Year
S65B40	3,999 cc (244.0 cu in)	309 kW (420 PS; 414 hp) at 8,300 rpm	400 N⋅m (295 lb⋅ft) at 3,900 rpm	2007
S65B44	4,361 cc (266.1 cu in)	331 kW (450 PS; 444 hp) at 8,300 rpm	440 N⋅m (325 lb⋅ft) at 3,750 rpm	2010

=== S65B40 ===
The S65B40 has a bore of 92 mm (3.6 in) and a stroke of 75.2 mm (3.0 in).

Applications:

- 2008-2013 BMW E90/92/93 M3
- 2009-2014 Wiesmann MF4-S

=== S65B44 ===
The S65B44 is an enlarged version of the S65, due to a larger stroke of 82 mm (3.23 in). It also uses a lightweight titanium exhaust.

Applications:

- 2010-2011 BMW E92 M3 GTS
- 2011-2012 BMW E90 M3 CRT sedan

=== P65 ===
The P65 engine is used for motor racing.

Applications:

=== P65B40 ===
- 2008 BMW M3 ALMS
- 2009 BMW M3 GT2 racing car

=== P65B44 ===
- 2010-2015 BMW Z4 GT3 racing car
- 2013-2016 BMW Z4 GTE racing car

== See also ==
- List of BMW engines
