= January 2012 Gulf 12 Hours =

1st Gulf 12 Hours endurance race

The layout of Yas Marina Circuit

The January 2012 Gulf 12 Hours was the first edition of the Gulf 12 Hours held at Yas Marina Circuit on 20 January 2012. It was organized by Driving Force Events Ltd. and contested with GT3-spec, GT4-spec, one-make spec, and Group CN cars.

The race was won by Marco Cioci, Matt Griffin and Piergiuseppe Perazzini in the #1 AF Corse 1 Ferrari 458 Italia GT3.

== Race Results ==
=== Part 1 ===
Class winners denoted in bold.

Pos.	Class	No.	Team	Drivers	Car	Laps	Time/Gap
1	**GT3**	**3**	**(Italy) AF Corse 1**	**(Italy) Marco Cioci** **(Republic of Ireland) Matt Griffin** **(Italy) Piergiuseppe Perazzini**	**Ferrari 458 Italia GT3**	**151**	**6:00:00.326**
2	GT3	1	(Switzerland) Kessel Racing/Racing Car SA	(Poland) Michał Broniszewski (Portugal) António Coimbra (Portugal) Miguel Ramos (Austria) Philipp Peter	Ferrari 458 Italia GT3	151	+1:12.800
3	GT3	5	(United States) United Autosports	(Scotland) Ryan Dalziel (Venezuela) Alex Popow (Venezuela) Enzo Potolicchio	Audi R8 LMS	151	+2:14.051
4	GT3	90	(Italy) AF Corse	(Venezuela) Gaetano Ardagna (Italy) Niki Cadei (Italy) Giuseppe Cirò	Ferrari 458 Italia GT3	146	+5 Laps
5	GT3	4	(Italy) Autorlando	(Venezuela) Emilio Di Guida (Venezuela) Paolo Andreas (Venezuela) Pablo Paladino	Porsche 997 GT3-R	146	+5 Laps
6	**CUP**	**8**	**(Italy) Bonaldi Motorports**	**(Italy) Alessandro Caffi** **(Italy) Andrea Mame** **(Italy) Mirko Zanardini**	**Lamborghini Gallardo Cup**	**143**	**+8 Laps**
7	**CN2**	**45**	**(Italy) Avelon Formula 1**	**(Italy) Ivan Bellarosa** **(Italy) Guglielmo Belotti** **(Singapore) Denis Lian**	**Wolf GB08**	**142**	**+9 Laps**
8	CN2	18	(France) Ibanez Racing Service	(France) Philippe Macé (France) Jean-Pierre Mothe (France) Philippe Yschard	Norma M20-F	142	+9 Laps
9	CUP	10	(France) Team Lompech Sport	(France) Thibault Bossy (France) Grégory Guilvert (France) Jean Charles Migniac	Renault Mégane Eurocup	141	+10 Laps
10	CUP	9	(Sweden) PFI-Racing	(Sweden) Mikael Bender (Sweden) Johan Löfqvist (Sweden) Patrik Skoog	Porsche 911 GT3 Cup	141	+10 Laps
11	CN2	46	(Italy) Avelon Formula 2	(United Arab Emirates) Juma Ali Al Daheri (Italy) Riccardo Romagnoli (Italy) Edo Varini (Italy) Giorgio Vinella	Wolf GB08	135	+16 Laps
12	**GT4**	**6**	**(United Arab Emirates) Yas Marina Circuit**	**(United Arab Emirates) Saeed Al Mehairi** **(United Arab Emirates) Mohamed Al Mutawa** **(United Arab Emirates) Thani Al Thani**	**Aston Martin Vantage GT4**	**123**	**+28 Laps**
13	GT4	7	(Malaysia) Aylezo Motorsports	(Malaysia) Jazeman Firhan Bin Jaafar (Malaysia) Muhammad Hiqmar Danial Bin Hidzir (Malaysia) "Low"	Lotus 2-Eleven	71	+80 Laps
14	CN2	15	(United Kingdom) If Motorsport 1	(United Kingdom) Manhal Allos (France) Pierre Renom (United Kingdom) Mark Smithson	Ligier JS49	50	+101 Laps
15 DNF	CN2	16	(United Kingdom) If Motorsport 2	(Ecuador) Andrés Serrano (United States) Kevin Weeda (United Kingdom) Matt Bell	Ligier JS49	28	+123 Laps

=== Part 2 ===
Class winners denoted in bold.

Pos.	Class	No.	Team	Drivers	Car	Laps	Time/Gap
1	**GT3**	**3**	**(Italy) AF Corse 1**	**(Italy) Marco Cioci** **(Republic of Ireland) Matt Griffin** **(Italy) Piergiuseppe Perazzini**	**Ferrari 458 Italia GT3**	**299**	**6:00:16.599**
2	GT3	1	(Switzerland) Kessel Racing/Racing Car SA	(Poland) Michał Broniszewski (Portugal) António Coimbra (Portugal) Miguel Ramos (Austria) Philipp Peter	Ferrari 458 Italia GT3	299	+2.652
3	GT3	5	(United States) United Autosports	(Scotland) Ryan Dalziel (Venezuela) Alex Popow (Venezuela) Enzo Potolicchio	Audi R8 LMS	299	+9.884
4	GT3	90	(Italy) AF Corse	(Venezuela) Gaetano Ardagna (Italy) Niki Cadei (Italy) Giuseppe Cirò	Ferrari 458 Italia GT3	293	+6 Laps
5	GT3	4	(Italy) Autorlando	(Venezuela) Emilio Di Guida (Venezuela) Paolo Andreas (Venezuela) Pablo Paladino	Porsche 997 GT3-R	287	+12 Laps
6	**CUP**	**9**	**(Sweden) PFI-Racing**	**(Sweden) Mikael Bender** **(Sweden) Johan Löfqvist** **(Sweden) Patrik Skoog**	**Porsche 911 GT3 Cup**	**281**	**+18 Laps**
7	CUP	8	(Italy) Bonaldi Motorports	(Italy) Alessandro Caffi (Italy) Andrea Mame (Italy) Mirko Zanardini	Lamborghini Gallardo Cup	280	+19 Laps
8	**CN2**	**18**	**(France) Ibanez Racing Service**	**(France) Philippe Macé** **(France) Jean-Pierre Mothe** **(France) Philippe Yschard**	**Norma M20-F**	**277**	**+22 Laps**
9 DNF	CN2	45	(Italy) Avelon Formula 1	(Italy) Ivan Bellarosa (Italy) Guglielmo Belotti (Singapore) Denis Lian	Wolf GB08	272	+27 Laps
10	GT4	6	(United Arab Emirates) Yas Marina Circuit	(United Arab Emirates) Saeed Al Mehairi (United Arab Emirates) Mohamed Al Mutawa (United Arab Emirates) Thani Al Thani	Aston Martin Vantage GT4	268	+31 Laps
11	CUP	10	(France) Team Lompech Sport	(France) Thibault Bossy (France) Grégory Guilvert (France) Jean Charles Migniac	Renault Mégane Eurocup	251	+48 Laps
12 DNF	CN2	46	(Italy) Avelon Formula 2	(United Arab Emirates) Juma Ali Al Daheri (Italy) Riccardo Romagnoli (Italy) Edo Varini (Italy) Giorgio Vinella	Wolf GB08	216	+83 Laps
13 DNC	GT4	7	(Malaysia) Aylezo Motorsports	(Malaysia) Jazeman Firhan Bin Jaafar (Malaysia) Muhammad Hiqmar Danial Bin Hidzir (Malaysia) "Low"	Lotus 2-Eleven	176	+123 Laps
14 DNF	CN2	15	(United Kingdom) If Motorsport 1	(United Kingdom) Manhal Allos (France) Pierre Renom (United Kingdom) Mark Smithson	Ligier JS49	144	+155 Laps
15 DNS	CN2	16	(United Kingdom) If Motorsport 2	(Ecuador) Andrés Serrano (United States) Kevin Weeda (United Kingdom) Matt Bell	Ligier JS49	28	+271 Laps
