= 2014 Gulf 12 Hours =

4th Gulf 12 Hours endurance race

The layout of Yas Marina Circuit

The 2014 Gulf 12 Hours was the 4th edition of the Gulf 12 Hours. The race was held at Yas Marina Circuit on 13 December 2014. It was contested with GT3-spec, Porsche Cup cars, and Group CN cars.

The race was won by Davide Rigon, Steve Wyatt and Michele Rugolo in the #3 AF Corse Ferrari 458 Italia GT3.

== Race results ==
=== Part 1 ===
Class winners denoted in bold.

Pos.	Class	#	Team	Drivers	Car	Laps
1	**Pro**	**3**	**(Italy) AF Corse**	**(Italy) Davide Rigon** **(Australia) Steve Wyatt** **(Italy) Michele Rugolo**	**Ferrari 458 Italia GT3**	**157**
2	Pro	1	(United Arab Emirates) Abu Dhabi Racing Black Falcon	(United Arab Emirates) Khaled Al Qubaisi (Netherlands) Jeroen Bleekemolen (Germany) Bernd Schneider	Mercedes-Benz SLS AMG GT3	157
3	Pro	59	(United Kingdom) McLaren GT	(Portugal) Alvaro Parente (France) Kevin Estre (United Kingdom) Rob Bell	McLaren 650S GT3	157
4	**Pro-Am**	**2**	**(Germany) Black Falcon**	**(Saudi Arabia) Abdulaziz Al Faisal** **(Germany) Hubert Haupt** **(Australia) Richard Muscat**	**Mercedes-Benz SLS AMG GT3**	**157**
5	Pro-Am	11	(Switzerland) Kessel Racing	(Russia) Vadim Gitlin (Spain) Isaac Tutumlu (Italy) Marco Frezza	Ferrari 458 Italia GT3	156
6	Pro-Am	10	(Russia) GT Russian	(Russia) Alexey Vasilyev (United Arab Emirates) Karim Al Azhari (Estonia) Marko Asmer	Mercedes-Benz SLS AMG GT3	156
7	Pro-Am	88	(United Arab Emirates) Dragon Racing	(Saudi Arabia) Mohammed Jawa (United Kingdom) Sean Walkinshaw (South Africa) Jordan Grogor	Ferrari 458 Italia GT3	155
8	Pro-Am	4	(Italy) AF Corse	(Italy) Piergiuseppe Perazzini (Portugal) Filipe Barreiros (Italy) Marco Cioci	Ferrari 458 Italia GT3	155
9	Pro-Am	5	(Italy) AF Corse	(Switzerland) Thomas Flohr (Italy) Francesco Castellacci (Italy) Andrea Rizzoli	Ferrari 458 Italia GT3	155
10	**Cup**	**33**	**(Germany) MRS GT-Racing**	**(Germany) Christian Engelhart** **(Germany) Ralf Bohn** **(Russia) Ilya Melnikov** **(Germany) Siegfried Venema**	**Porsche 911 GT3 Cup**	**150**
11	Pro-Am	17	(Hong Kong) Absolute Racing	(China) Sun Jing Zu (China) Ho-Pin Tung (China) Jian Wei Wang	Audi R8 LMS GT3	150
12	**CN2**	**45**	**(Italy) Avelon Formula**	**(Italy) Guglielmo Belotti** **(Italy) Ivan Bellarosa**	**Wolf GB08**	**147**
13	CN2	46	(Italy) Avelon Formula	(Italy) Gianluca Pizzuti (Switzerland) Simon Stoller (Italy) Fabio Emanuela	Wolf GB08	146
14	Cup	50	(France) Larbre Compétition	(France) Denis Gibaud (France) Manuel Rodrigues (France) Franck Labescat (France) Christian Filippon	Porsche 911 GT3 Cup	143
15	Pro-Am	77	(Italy) AF Corse	(Belgium) Adrien de Leneer (Monaco) Cédric Sbirrazzuoli (Russia) David Akhobadze	Ferrari 458 Italia GT3	143
16	Cup	67	(San Marino) GDL Racing	(Belgium) Nicolas Vandierendonck (Australia) Rob Thomson (United Arab Emirates) Youssef Bassil	Porsche 911 GT3 Cup	142
17	Pro-Am	60	(United Kingdom) McLaren GT	(Netherlands) Peter Kox (Netherlands) Nico Pronk (France) Gilles Vannelet	McLaren 650S GT3	142
18	Cup	43	(United Kingdom) STP Racing with Sopp + Sopp	(United Kingdom) Matthew Telling (South Africa) Liam Venter (United Kingdom) Ryan Ratcliffe	Porsche 911 GT3 Cup	141
19	**Gent**	**99**	**(Switzerland) Kessel Racing**	**(Australia) Liam Talbot** **(Spain) Jorge Lorenzo** **(Italy) Marco Zanuttini** **(Belgium) Jacques Duyver**	**Ferrari 458 Italia GT3**	**127**
20	Gent	89	(Italy) Villorba Corse	(Switzerland) Christophe Hurni (France) Cédric Mezard (Switzerland) Didier Cuche	Ferrari 458 Italia GT3	108
21	CN2	48	(Portugal) CRM Motorsport	(Italy) Nicola de Val (Italy) Stefano de Val (Portugal) José Pedro Faria	Wolf GB08	95
22	Pro-Am	69	(United Kingdom) Gulf Racing	(France) Frederic Fatien (Germany) Roald Goethe (United Kingdom) Stuart Hall	Lamborghini Gallardo FL2	91
23	CN2	47	(United Kingdom) Motionsport	(United Kingdom) Pete Storey (United Kingdom) Ben Gower (United Kingdom) Ollie Chadwick	Wolf GB08	23
24	Pro-Am	75	(Czech Republic) I.S.R.	(Czech Republic) Filip Salaquarda (India) Aditya Patel (Czech Republic) Jiri Pisarik	Audi R8 LMS GT3	9

=== Part 2 ===
Class winners denoted in bold.

Pos.	Class	#	Team	Drivers	Car	Laps
1	**Pro**	**3**	**(Italy) AF Corse**	**(Italy) Davide Rigon** **(Australia) Steve Wyatt** **(Italy) Michele Rugolo**	**Ferrari 458 Italia GT3**	**315**
2	Pro	1	(United Arab Emirates) Abu Dhabi Racing Black Falcon	(United Arab Emirates) Khaled Al Qubaisi (Netherlands) Jeroen Bleekemolen (Germany) Bernd Schneider	Mercedes-Benz SLS AMG GT3	315
3	Pro	59	(United Kingdom) McLaren GT	(Portugal) Alvaro Parente (France) Kevin Estre (United Kingdom) Rob Bell	McLaren 650S GT3	315
4	**Pro-Am**	**2**	**(Germany) Black Falcon**	**(Saudi Arabia) Abdulaziz Al Faisal** **(Germany) Hubert Haupt** **(Australia) Richard Muscat**	**Mercedes-Benz SLS AMG GT3**	**314**
5	Pro-Am	4	(Italy) AF Corse	(Italy) Piergiuseppe Perazzini (Portugal) Filipe Barreiros (Italy) Marco Cioci	Ferrari 458 Italia GT3	311
6	Pro-Am	88	(United Arab Emirates) Dragon Racing	(Saudi Arabia) Mohammed Jawa (United Kingdom) Sean Walkinshaw (South Africa) Jordan Grogor	Ferrari 458 Italia GT3	311
7	Pro-Am	5	(Italy) AF Corse	(Switzerland) Thomas Flohr (Italy) Francesco Castellacci (Italy) Andrea Rizzoli	Ferrari 458 Italia GT3	311
8	Pro-Am	10	(Russia) GT Russian	(Russia) Alexey Vasilyev (United Arab Emirates) Karim Al Azhari (Estonia) Marko Asmer	Mercedes-Benz SLS AMG GT3	310
9	Pro-Am	17	(Hong Kong) Absolute Racing	(China) Sun Jing Zu (China) Ho-Pin Tung (China) Jian Wei Wang	Audi R8 LMS GT3	303
10	Pro-Am	11	(Switzerland) Kessel Racing	(Russia) Vadim Gitlin (Spain) Isaac Tutumlu (Italy) Marco Frezza	Ferrari 458 Italia GT3	302
11	Pro-Am	77	(Italy) AF Corse	(Belgium) Adrien de Leneer (Monaco) Cédric Sbirrazzuoli (Russia) David Akhobadze	Ferrari 458 Italia GT3	298
12	Pro-Am	60	(United Kingdom) McLaren GT	(Netherlands) Peter Kox (Netherlands) Nico Pronk (France) Gilles Vannelet	McLaren 650S GT3	294
13	**Cup**	**33**	**(Germany) MRS GT-Racing**	**(Germany) Christian Engelhart** **(Germany) Ralf Bohn** **(Russia) Ilya Melnikov** **(Germany) Siegfried Venema**	**Porsche 911 GT3 Cup**	**292**
14	Cup	43	(United Kingdom) STP Racing with Sopp + Sopp	(United Kingdom) Matthew Telling (South Africa) Liam Venter (United Kingdom) Ryan Ratcliffe	Porsche 911 GT3 Cup	289
15	Cup	50	(France) Larbre Compétition	(France) Denis Gibaud (France) Manuel Rodrigues (France) Franck Labescat (France) Christian Filippon	Porsche 911 GT3 Cup	287
16	Cup	67	(San Marino) GDL Racing	(Belgium) Nicolas Vandierendonck (Australia) Rob Thomson (United Arab Emirates) Youssef Bassil	Porsche 911 GT3 Cup	286
17	**CN2**	**46**	**(Italy) Avelon Formula**	**(Italy) Gianluca Pizzuti** **(Switzerland) Simon Stoller** **(Italy) Fabio Emanuela**	**Wolf GB08**	**281**
18 DNF	**Gent**	**99**	**(Switzerland) Kessel Racing**	**(Australia) Liam Talbot** **(Spain) Jorge Lorenzo** **(Italy) Marco Zanuttini** **(Belgium) Jacques Duyver**	**Ferrari 458 Italia GT3**	**261**
19	Gent	89	(Italy) Villorba Corse	(Switzerland) Christophe Hurni (France) Cédric Mezard (Switzerland) Didier Cuche	Ferrari 458 Italia GT3	250
20	CN2	45	(Italy) Avelon Formula	(Italy) Guglielmo Belotti (Italy) Ivan Bellarosa	Wolf GB08	203
21 DNF	CN2	48	(Portugal) CRM Motorsport	(Italy) Nicola de Val (Italy) Stefano de Val (Portugal) José Pedro Faria	Wolf GB08	147
22 DNF	Pro-Am	69	(United Kingdom) Gulf Racing	(France) Frederic Fatien (Germany) Roald Goethe (United Kingdom) Stuart Hall	Lamborghini Gallardo FL2	109
23 DNF	CN2	47	(United Kingdom) Motionsport	(United Kingdom) Pete Storey (United Kingdom) Ben Gower (United Kingdom) Ollie Chadwick	Wolf GB08	38
DNS	Pro-Am	75	(Czech Republic) I.S.R.	(Czech Republic) Filip Salaquarda (India) Aditya Patel (Czech Republic) Jiri Pisarik	Audi R8 LMS GT3	—
