= Piergiuseppe Perazzini =

Italian racing driver (born 1956)

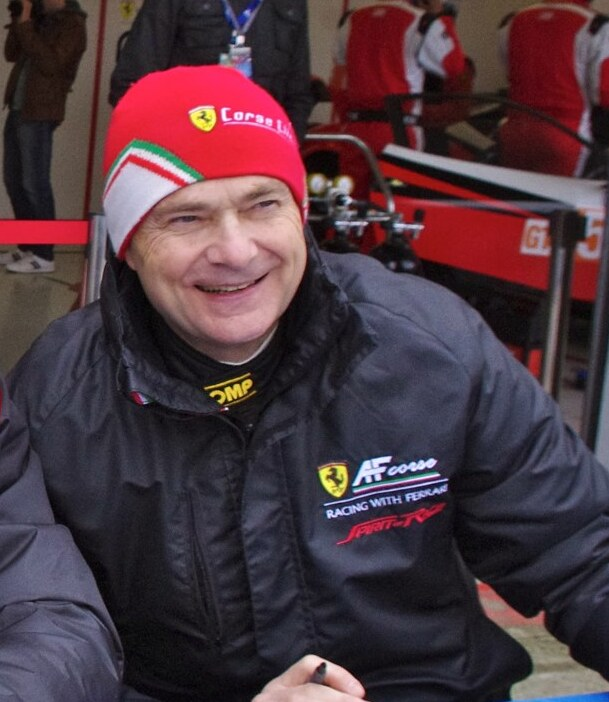
- Perazzini in 2014
- Nationality: (Italy) Italian
- Born: 25 January 1956 (age 70) Florence, Italy
- Categorisation: FIA Silver (until 2013); FIA Bronze (2014–2019)

Championship titles
- 2011 2003-2004: Endurance Champions Cup; Italian GT Championship – GT

Piergiuseppe Perazzini (born 25 January 1956) is an Italian surgeon and racing driver who last competed in the GT3 class of the Le Mans Cup for AF Corse. A long-serving gentleman driver, he was successful for Ferrari at LMGTE Am level in WEC and ELMS, and is a six-time winner of the 6 Hours of Vallelunga, a record he shares with Marco Cioci.

== Personal life ==
Alongside his racing career, Perazzini works as a surgeon and is the president of Clinica San Francesco in Verona, which was founded by his parents in 1956.

== Career ==
Perazzini made his car racing debut in 1997, racing in the Misano 12 Hours for Megadrive. Six years later, Perazzini made his full-time debut in cars, as he joined Racing Box to compete in the Italian GT Championship aboard a Chrysler Viper GTS-R. After securing wins at Misano and Pergusa, Perazzini won both races at Magione and secured his first Italian GT title with a sixth win of the season at Vallelunga. During 2003, Perazzini also made a one-off appearance in the GT class of the FIA GT Championship for Megadrive at Monza.

Remaining with Megadrive for 2004, Perazzini began the season by taking wins at Imola, Monza and Magione, before ending the season with a win at Vallelunga five rounds later to clinch his second consecutive Italian GT title. Continuing with Megadrive as they switched to a Maserati MC12 for 2005, Perazzini scored five wins and four other podiums en route to a third-place points finish. During 2005, Perazzini also finished third in the Mil Milhas Brasileiras for Racing Box. Another season in Italian GT with Racing Box then ensued, in which he scored a lone win at Monza en route to a ninth-place points finish. During 2006, Perazzini also raced with the same team for most of the International GT Open season, as well as the 6 Hours of Vallelunga, which he won alongside Pedro Lamy and Marco Cioci.

In 2007, Perazzini moved to the Le Mans Series as Racing Box campaigned a Saleen S7-R in the GT1 class, scoring a lone podium at Valencia to end the year seventh in points. Perazzini then returned to the Italian GT Championship for 2008, beginning a prolific Ferrari career with three podiums as he ended the season 10th in points, before capping off the year with his second win at the 6 Hours of Vallelunga, this time for Advanced Engineering. The following year, Perazzini continued with Megadrive for a dual program in both International GT Open and Italian GT, in which he found more success in the latter as he secured runner-up honors in GT2 with five wins to his name.

Joining AF Corse for 2010, Perazzini raced a Ferrari F430 GTC in the GT2 class of the Italian GT Championship, in which he scored an outright win at Mugello and a class win at Magione to secure a fifth-place points finish. During 2010, Perazzini also competed in the LMP2 class of the Le Mans Series and the 24 Hours of Le Mans for Racing Box. Remaining with AF Corse for 2011, Perazzini finished runner-up in the LMGTE Am standings of the Le Mans Series with a best result of second. During 2011, Perazzini also raced with them at the 24 Hours of Le Mans, as well as the 6 Hours of Vallelunga, which he won as he secured the Endurance Champions Cup title.

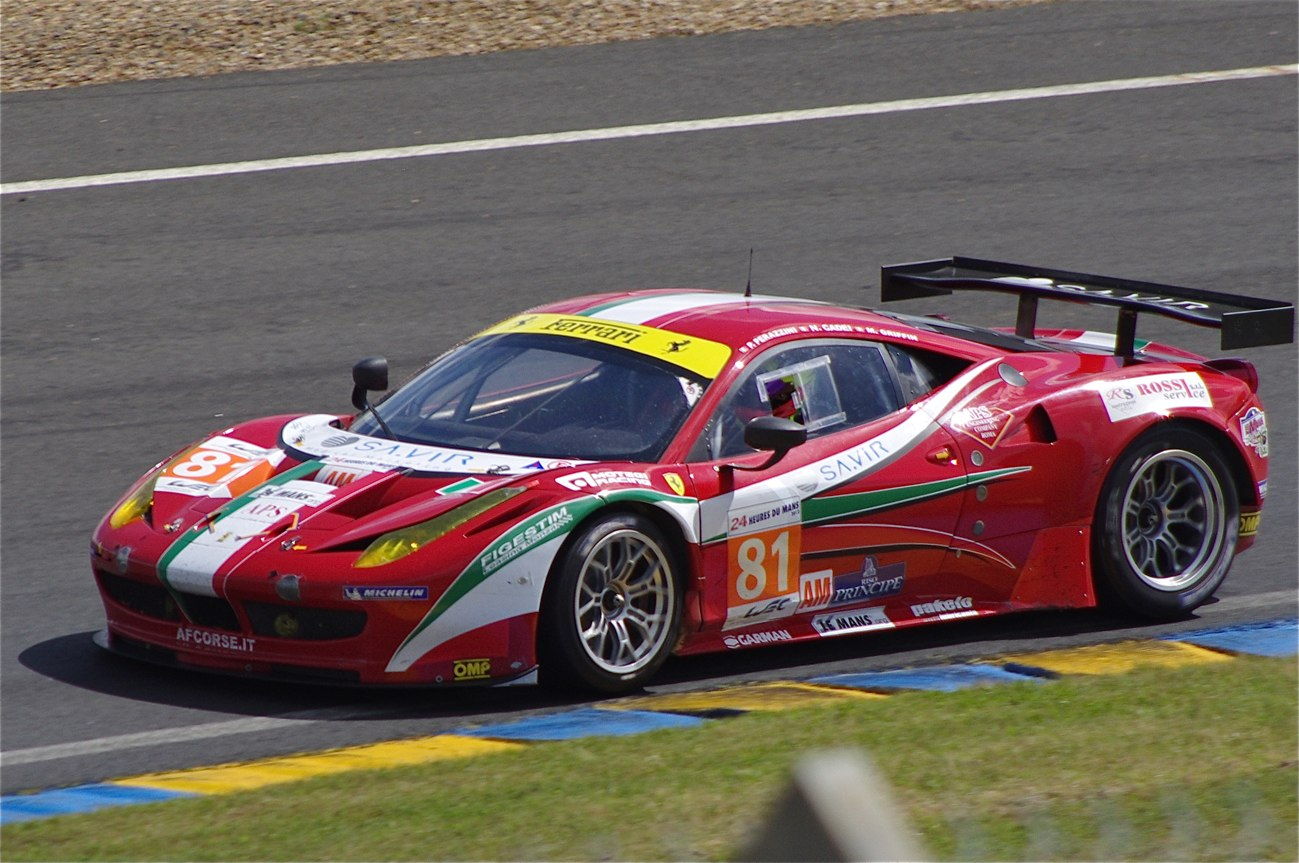
Perazzini during the early hours of the 2012 24 Hours of Le Mans, before he collided with Anthony Davidson's Toyota.

The following year, Perazzini won the inaugural Gulf 12 Hours, before finishing runner-up in the LMGTE Am standings of the European Le Mans Series with the new Ferrari 458 Italia GT2. During the 2012 24 Hours of Le Mans, Perazzini suffered a spectacular crash as he tagged the rear of the No. 8 Toyota of Anthony Davidson at Mulsanne corner, sending Davidson airborne and into the barrier at high speed. Davidson fractured his T11 and T12 vertebrae. Perazzini was unhurt, and returned two months later to take his first FIA World Endurance Championship win at the 6 Hours of Silverstone. In 2013, Perazzini remained with AF Corse for another season in the LMGTE class of the European Le Mans Series, in which he scored a pair of podiums to end the year fourth in points. During 2013, Perazzini also finished second in class at the 24 Hours of Le Mans and scored his third 6 Hours of Vallelunga win towards the end of the year.

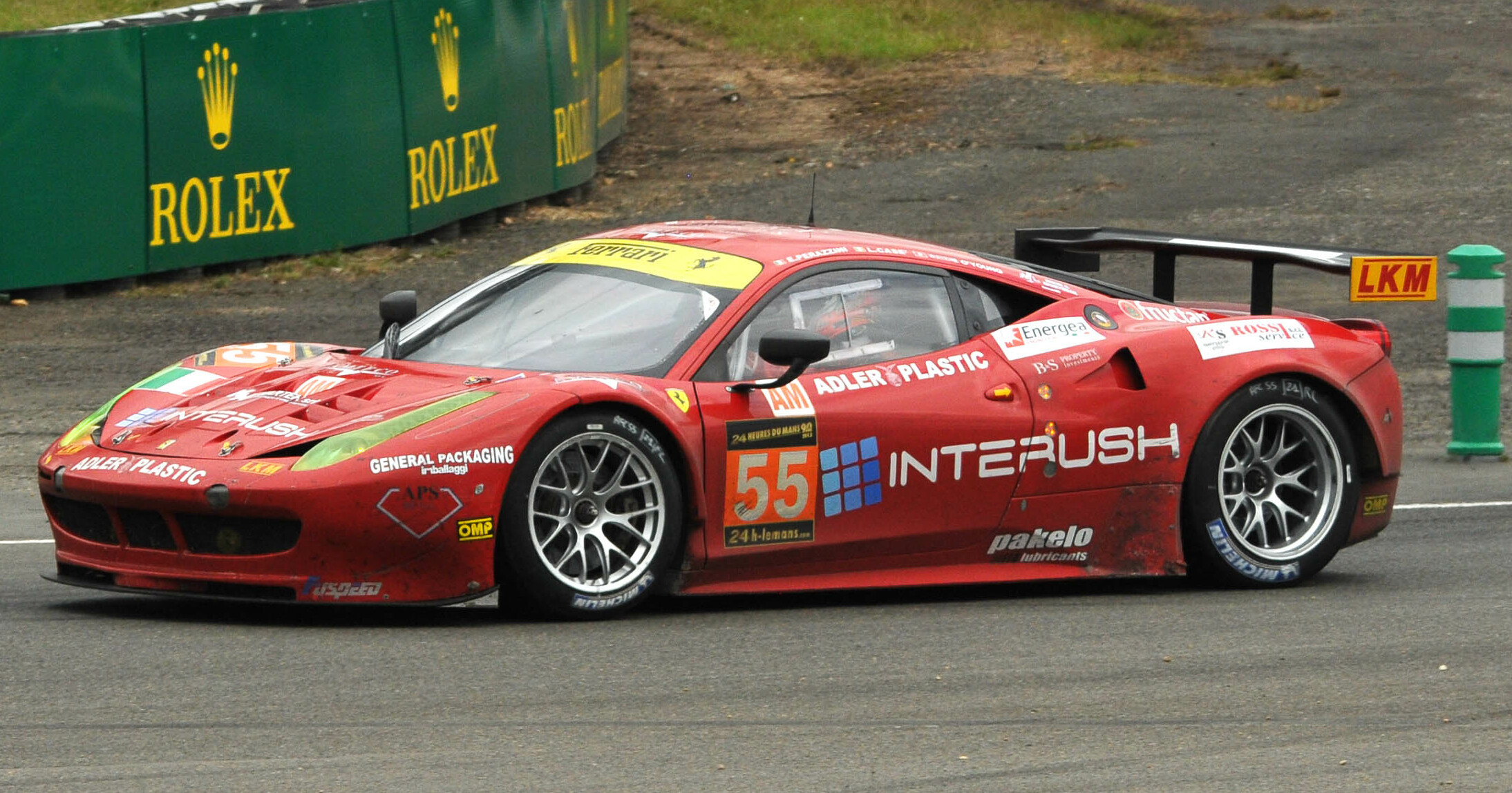
Perazzini returned to Le Mans in 2013 with AF Corse and Ferrari, clinching a podium in LMGTE Am.

Continuing with AF Corse for another ELMS season in 2014, Perazzini finished sixth in the LMGTE standings with a best result of second at Estoril, before ending the year with a win at the 6 Hours of Vallelunga and a class podium at the Gulf 12 Hours. During 2014, Perazzini also raced in select rounds of the United SportsCar Championship for Spirit of Race in GTD. After a season in the Blancpain Endurance Series and an appearance at the 2015 12 Hours of Sebring, Perazzini returned to the European Le Mans Series for the following year, scoring a best result of second at the Red Bull Ring en route to an eighth-place points finish in GTE. During 2016, Perazzini also raced a Ferrari 488 for AF Corse in a one-off appearance in International GT Open, as well as competing for AT Racing at the 24 Hours of Spa.

In 2017, Perazzini remained with AF Corse as he returned to International GT Open, in which he scored a lone Pro-Am win at Spa and three other podiums to end the year runner-up in points. At the end of the year, Perazzini won the 6 Hours of Vallelunga for the same team, driving a Ligier JS P3. After starting 2018 in the 24H Proto Series for Spirit of Race, Perazzini returned to AF Corse for the rest of the year to race in the GT3 class of the Le Mans Cup, in which he scored a lone win at Road to Le Mans to end the season fourth in points. Towards the end of 2018, Perazzini represented Italy in the only edition of the FIA GT Nations Cup alongside Matteo Cressoni.

== Racing record ==
=== Racing career summary ===
Season	Series	Team	Races	Wins	Poles	F/Laps	Podiums	Points	Position
1997	Misano 12 Hours	Megadrive	1	0	0	0	0	—N/a	7th
2000	Italian GT Championship		1	0	0	0	1		
2003	Italian GT Championship – GT	Racing Box	16	6	3	4	12	118	**1st**
2003	FIA GT Championship – GT	Megadrive	1	0	0	0	0	0	NC
2004	Italian GT Championship – GT	Megadrive	16	4	1	2	10	189	**1st**
2004	6 Hours of Vallelunga	Racing Box	1	0	0	0	0	—N/a	DNF
2005	Mil Milhas Brasileiras	Racing Box	1	0	0	0	1	—N/a	**3rd**
2005	Italian GT Championship – GT1	Megadrive	14	5	3	5	9	181	**3rd**
2006	Italian GT Championship – GT1	Racing Box	7	1	1	1	5	80	9th
2006	International GT Open – GTB	Racing Box	1	1	2	0	1		
2006	International GT Open – GTS	Racing Box	7	3	0	0	6		
2006	6 Hours of Vallelunga	Racing Box	1	1	0	0	1	—N/a	**1st**
2007	Le Mans Series – GT1	Racing Box	5	0	0	0	1	20	7th
2007	Belcar 12 Hours of Zolder	Racing Box	1	0	0	0	0	—N/a	7th
2008	Italian GT Championship – GT2	Megadrive	14	0	0	0	3	72	10th
2008	6 Hours of Vallelunga	Advanced Engineering	1	1	0	0	1	—N/a	**1st**
2009	International GT Open – Super GT	Megadrive	16	0	0	0	3	45	6th
2009	Italian GT Championship – GT2	Megadrive	14	5	0	0	7	131	**2nd**
2009	6 Hours of Vallelunga	AF Corse	1	0	0	0	0	—N/a	DNF
2010	Dubai 24 Hour – A6	De Lorenzi Racing	1	0	0	0	0	—N/a	DNF
2010	Le Mans Series – LMP2	Racing Box	3	0	0	0	0	15	15th
2010	24 Hours of Le Mans – LMP2	Racing Box	1	0	0	0	0	—N/a	DNF
2010	Superstars GTSprint Series – GT2	AF Corse	2	1	1	0	1	31	6th
2010	Italian GT Championship – GT2	AF Corse	13	2	0	1	6	110	5th
2010	6 Hours of Vallelunga	AF Corse	1	0	0	0	0	—N/a	8th
2011	Dubai 24 Hour – A6	AF Corse	1	0	0	0	1	—N/a	**2nd**
2011	Le Mans Series – LMGTE Am	AF Corse	5	0	0	0	3	58	**2nd**
2011	Intercontinental Le Mans Cup – LMGTE Am	AF Corse	4	1	0	0	2	/	/
2011	Endurance Champions Cup – Gold Cup	AF Corse	4	0	0	0	3		**1st**
2011	24 Hours of Le Mans – LMGTE Am	AF Corse	1	0	0	0	0	—N/a	DNF
2011	Blancpain Endurance Series – GT3 Pro	AF Corse	1	0	0	0	0	6	34th
2011	6 Hours of Vallelunga	AF Corse	1	1	0	0	1	—N/a	**1st**
2012	Gulf 12 Hours	AF Corse	1	1	0	0	1	—N/a	**1st**
2012	European Le Mans Series – LMGTE Am	AF Corse	3	0	1	0	2	34	**2nd**
2012	FIA World Endurance Championship - LMGTE Am	AF Corse-Waltrip	2	0	0	0	0	/	/
2012	FIA World Endurance Championship - LMGTE Am	AF Corse	1	1	0	0	1	/	/
2012	24 Hours of Le Mans – LMGTE Am	AF Corse	1	0	0	0	0	—N/a	DNF
2013	European Le Mans Series – LMGTE	AF Corse	5	0	0	0	2	63	4th
2013	FIA World Endurance Championship – LMGTE Am	AF Corse	1	0	0	0	1	36	16th
2013	24 Hours of Le Mans – LMGTE Am	AF Corse	1	0	0	0	1	—N/a	**2nd**
2013	6 Hours of Vallelunga	AF Corse	1	1	0	0	1	—N/a	**1st**
2014	United SportsCar Championship – GTD	Spirit of Race	2	0	0	0	0	32	60th
2014	European Le Mans Series – LMGTE	AF Corse	5	0	0	0	1	48	6th
2014	6 Hours of Vallelunga	AF Corse	1	1	0	0	1	—N/a	**1st**
2014	Gulf 12 Hours – Pro-Am	AF Corse	1	0	0	0	1	—N/a	**2nd**
2015	United SportsCar Championship – GTD	AF Corse	1	0	0	0	0	1	62nd
2015	Blancpain Endurance Series – Pro-Am	AF Corse	5	0	0	0	0	12	22nd
2016	Blancpain GT Sports Club	AF Corse	2	0	0	1	2	21	11th
2016	European Le Mans Series – GTE	AF Corse	6	0	0	0	1	50	8th
2016	International GT Open – Pro-Am	AF Corse	2	0	0	0	1	12	16th
2016	Blancpain GT Series Endurance Cup – Pro-Am	AT Racing	1	0	0	0	0	0	NC
2016	Intercontinental GT Challenge – Am	AT Racing	1	0	0	0	0	0	NC
2017	International GT Open – Pro-Am	AF Corse	14	1	0	0	4	65	**2nd**
2017	Blancpain GT Sports Club	AF Corse	2	2	1	1	2	33	9th
2017	6 Hours of Vallelunga – LMP3	AF Corse	1	1	0	0	1	—N/a	**1st**
2018	24H Proto Series Continents – P3	Spirit of Race	3	0	0	0	3	37	**3rd**
2018	Le Mans Cup – GT3	AF Corse	6	1	1	0	4	78	4th
2018	FIA GT Nations Cup	Team Italy	1	0	0	0	0	—N/a	6th

=== Complete FIA GT Championship results ===
(key) (Races in bold indicate pole position) (Races in italics indicate fastest lap)

Year	Team	Car	Class	1	2	3	4	5	6	7	8	9	10	11	12	Pos.	Pts
2003	Megadrive	Chrysler Viper GTS-R	GT	CAT	MAG	PER	BRN	DON	SPA; 6H	SPA; 12H	SPA; 24H	AND	OSC	EST	MNZ; 13	NC	0

=== Complete European Le Mans Series results ===
(key) (Races in bold indicate pole position; results in italics indicate fastest lap)

Year	Entrant	Class	Chassis	Engine	1	2	3	4	5	6	Rank	Points
2007	Racing Box	GT1	Saleen S7-R	Ford 7.0L V8	MNZ; 5	VAL; 2	NUR; 4	SPA; Ret	SIL; 6	MIL	7th	20
2010	Racing Box	LMP2	Lola B09/80	Judd DB 3.4 L V8	LEC; Ret	SPA; WD	ALG	HUN; 6	SIL; 7		15th	15
2011	AF Corse	LMGTE Am	Ferrari F430 GT2	Ferrari 4.0 L V8	LEC; 2	SPA; 2	IMO; 3	SIL; 5	EST; 4		2nd	58
2012	AF Corse	LMGTE Am	Ferrari 458 Italia GT2	Ferrari 4.5 L V8	LEC; 3	**DON**; 2	PET; Ret				2nd	34
2013	AF Corse	LMGTE	Ferrari 458 Italia GT2	Ferrari 4.5 L V8	SIL; 7	IMO; 2	RBR; 4	HUN; 3	LEC; 4		4th	63
2014	AF Corse	LMGTE	Ferrari 458 Italia GT2	Ferrari 4.5 L V8	SIL; 6	IMO; Ret	RBR; 5	LEC; 4	EST; 2		6th	48
2016	AF Corse	LMGTE	Ferrari 458 Italia GT2	Ferrari 4.5 L V8	SIL; 7	IMO; 7	RBR; 2	LEC; Ret	SPA; 6	EST; 4	8th	50

=== 24 Hours of Le Mans results ===
Year	Team	Co-Drivers	Car	Class	Laps	Pos.	Class Pos.
2010	(Italy) Racing Box	(Italy) Luca Pirri (Italy) Marco Cioci	Lola B08/80	LMP2	57	DNF	DNF
2011	(Italy) AF Corse	(Italy) Marco Cioci (Republic of Ireland) Seán Paul Breslin	Ferrari F430 GTE	LMGTE Am	188	DNF	DNF
2012	(Italy) AF Corse	(Italy) Niki Cadei (Republic of Ireland) Matt Griffin	Ferrari 458 Italia GT2	LMGTE Am	70	DNF	DNF
2013	(Italy) AF Corse	(Hong Kong) Darryl O'Young (Italy) Lorenzo Casè	Ferrari 458 Italia GT2	LMGTE Am	305	26th	**2nd**

=== Complete GT World Challenge results ===
==== GT World Challenge Europe Endurance Cup ====
(Races in bold indicate pole position) (Races in italics indicate fastest lap)

Year	Team	Car	Class	1	2	3	4	5	6	7	Pos.	Points
2011	AF Corse	Ferrari 458 Italia GT3	GT3 Pro	MNZ	NAV	SPA; 6H	SPA; 12H	SPA; 24H	MAG	SIL; 7	34th	6
2015	AF Corse	Ferrari 458 Italia GT3	Pro-Am	MNZ; 10	SIL; 51	LEC; 38	SPA; 6H; 54	SPA; 12H; 54	SPA; 24H; Ret	NÜR; 32	22nd	12
2016	AT Racing	Ferrari 488 GT3	Pro-Am	MNZ	SIL	LEC	SPA; 6H; 48	SPA; 12H; 34	SPA; 24H; Ret	NÜR	NC	0

=== Complete FIA World Endurance Championship results ===
(key) (Races in bold indicate pole position; races in italics indicate fastest lap)

Year	Entrant	Class	Chassis	Engine	1	2	3	4	5	6	7	8	Rank	Points
2012	AF Corse	LMGTE Am	Ferrari 458 Italia GT2	Ferrari F142 4.5L V8	SEB	SPA; 4	LMS; Ret						88th	1
2012	AF Corse-Waltrip	LMGTE Am	Ferrari 458 Italia GT2	Ferrari F142 4.5L V8				SIL; 1	SÃO	BHR	FUJ	SHA	88th	1
2013	AF Corse	LMGTE Am	Ferrari 458 Italia GT2	Ferrari F142 4.5L V8	SIL	SPA	LMS; 2	SÃO	COA	FUJ	SHA	BHR	16th	36

=== Complete IMSA SportsCar Championship results ===
(key) (Races in bold indicate pole position; races in italics indicate fastest lap)

Year	Entrant	Class	Make	Engine	1	2	3	4	5	6	7	8	9	10	11	Rank	Points
2014	Spirit of Race	GTD	Ferrari 458 Italia GT3	Ferrari 4.5 L V8	DAY; 18	SEB	LAG	DET	WGL	MOS	IMS	ELK	VIR	COA	PET; 16	60th	32
2015	AF Corse	GTD	Ferrari 458 Italia GT3	Ferrari 4.5 L V8	DAY	SEB; 10†	LAG	DET	WGL	LIM	ELK	VIR	COA	PET		62nd	1

=== Complete Le Mans Cup results ===
(key) (Races in bold indicate pole position; results in italics indicate fastest lap)

Year	Entrant	Class	Chassis	1	2	3	4	5	6	7	Rank	Points
2018	AF Corse	GT3	Ferrari 488 GT3	LEC; 6	MNZ; 2	**LMS**; **1**; 1	LMS; 2 Ret	RBR; 2	SPA; WD	ALG; 2	4th	78
