= 2016 Blancpain GT Series Endurance Cup =

Sports season

The 2016 Blancpain GT Series Endurance Cup was the sixth season of the Blancpain GT Series Endurance Cup. The season started on 24 April at Monza and ended on 18 September at the Nürburgring. The season featured five rounds, with each race lasting for a duration of three hours besides the 24 Hours of Spa and the 1000 km Paul Ricard events. After developing their partnership, Blancpain and the SRO decided that 2016 would see both the Sprint and Endurance Series further integrated into the Blancpain GT Series, putting the emphasis on the prestigious overall drivers' and manufacturers' titles causing the Endurance Series name to change from Blancpain Endurance Series to Blancpain GT Series Endurance Cup.

== Calendar ==
On 18 September 2015, the Stéphane Ratel Organisation announced the 2016 calendar.

Event	Race	Circuit	Date	Report
1	3 Hours of Monza	Autodromo Nazionale Monza, Monza, Italy	24 April	Report
2	3 Hours of Silverstone	(United Kingdom) Silverstone Circuit, Silverstone, Great Britain	15 May	Report
3	1000 km Paul Ricard	Circuit Paul Ricard, Le Castellet, France	25 June	Report
4	Total 24 Hours of Spa	Circuit de Spa-Francorchamps, Spa, Belgium	30–31 July	Report
5	3 Hours of Nürburgring	Nürburgring, Nürburg, Germany	18 September	Report

== Entry list ==
Team	Car	No.	Drivers	Class	Rounds
(Germany) / AMG - Team Black Falcon (Note: Car No. 00 entered as AMG - Team Black Falcon, cars No. 56 and 68 entered as Black Falcon and car No. 57 also entered as Black Falcon, but at Round 1 as AMG - Team Black Falcon.); (Germany) / Black Falcon	Mercedes-AMG GT3	00	(Netherlands) Yelmer Buurman	P	3–4
(Germany) / AMG - Team Black Falcon; (Germany) / Black Falcon	Mercedes-AMG GT3	00	(Germany) Bernd Schneider	P	3–4
(Germany) / AMG - Team Black Falcon; (Germany) / Black Falcon	Mercedes-AMG GT3	00	(Saudi Arabia) Abdulaziz Bin Turki Al Faisal	P	3
(Germany) / AMG - Team Black Falcon; (Germany) / Black Falcon	Mercedes-AMG GT3	00	(Germany) Maro Engel	P	4
(Germany) / AMG - Team Black Falcon; (Germany) / Black Falcon	Mercedes-AMG GT3	56	(United Kingdom) Oliver Morley	PA	All
(Germany) / AMG - Team Black Falcon; (Germany) / Black Falcon	Mercedes-AMG GT3	56	(Spain) Miguel Toril	PA	All
(Germany) / AMG - Team Black Falcon; (Germany) / Black Falcon	Mercedes-AMG GT3	56	(Germany) Maro Engel	PA	1–3, 5
(Germany) / AMG - Team Black Falcon; (Germany) / Black Falcon	Mercedes-AMG GT3	56	(Saudi Arabia) Abdulaziz Bin Turki Al Faisal	PA	4
(Germany) / AMG - Team Black Falcon; (Germany) / Black Falcon	Mercedes-AMG GT3	56	(Spain) Daniel Juncadella	PA	4
(Germany) / AMG - Team Black Falcon; (Germany) / Black Falcon	Mercedes-AMG GT3	57	(United Kingdom) Adam Christodoulou	P	All
(Germany) / AMG - Team Black Falcon; (Germany) / Black Falcon	Mercedes-AMG GT3	57	(Germany) Hubert Haupt	P	All
(Germany) / AMG - Team Black Falcon; (Germany) / Black Falcon	Mercedes-AMG GT3	57	(Sweden) Andreas Simonsen	P	All
(Germany) / AMG - Team Black Falcon; (Germany) / Black Falcon	Mercedes-AMG GT3	68	(United Kingdom) Bradley Ellis	PA	5
(Germany) / AMG - Team Black Falcon; (Germany) / Black Falcon	Mercedes-AMG GT3	68	(United Kingdom) Euan Hankey	PA	5
(Germany) / AMG - Team Black Falcon; (Germany) / Black Falcon	Mercedes-AMG GT3	68	(Turkey) Salih Yoluc	PA	5
(Belgium) / Belgian Audi Club Team WRT (Note: All cars entered as Belgian Audi Club Team WRT with the exception of car No. 28, which entered as Audi Sport Team WRT at Round 4.) (Note: Only a limited number of cars per team were able to score points toward the Teams' championship. Therefore cars No. 3 and 4 entered as Belgian Audi Club Team WRT, but in the Teams' championship the drivers of cars No. 3 and 4 scored points for Team WRT.); (Belgium) / Audi Sport Team WRT	Audi R8 LMS	1	(Belgium) Dries Vanthoor	P	All
(Belgium) / Belgian Audi Club Team WRT; (Belgium) / Audi Sport Team WRT	Audi R8 LMS	1	(Belgium) Frédéric Vervisch	P	All
(Belgium) / Belgian Audi Club Team WRT; (Belgium) / Audi Sport Team WRT	Audi R8 LMS	1	(Belgium) Laurens Vanthoor	P	1–3, 5
(Belgium) / Belgian Audi Club Team WRT; (Belgium) / Audi Sport Team WRT	Audi R8 LMS	1	(United Kingdom) Will Stevens	P	4
(Belgium) / Belgian Audi Club Team WRT; (Belgium) / Audi Sport Team WRT	Audi R8 LMS	2	(Netherlands) Robin Frijns	P	All
(Belgium) / Belgian Audi Club Team WRT; (Belgium) / Audi Sport Team WRT	Audi R8 LMS	2	(United Kingdom) Stuart Leonard	P	All
(Belgium) / Belgian Audi Club Team WRT; (Belgium) / Audi Sport Team WRT	Audi R8 LMS	2	(United Kingdom) Michael Meadows	P	All
(Belgium) / Belgian Audi Club Team WRT; (Belgium) / Audi Sport Team WRT	Audi R8 LMS	3	(Brazil) Rodrigo Baptista	P	All
(Belgium) / Belgian Audi Club Team WRT; (Belgium) / Audi Sport Team WRT	Audi R8 LMS	3	(Portugal) Filipe Albuquerque	P	1–4
(Belgium) / Belgian Audi Club Team WRT; (Belgium) / Audi Sport Team WRT	Audi R8 LMS	3	(Brazil) Sérgio Jimenez	P	1–2, 4–5
(Belgium) / Belgian Audi Club Team WRT; (Belgium) / Audi Sport Team WRT	Audi R8 LMS	3	(Denmark) Jan Magnussen	P	3
(Belgium) / Belgian Audi Club Team WRT; (Belgium) / Audi Sport Team WRT	Audi R8 LMS	3	(France) Adrien Tambay	P	5
(Belgium) / Belgian Audi Club Team WRT; (Belgium) / Audi Sport Team WRT	Audi R8 LMS	4	(Germany) Pierre Kaffer	P	All
(Belgium) / Belgian Audi Club Team WRT; (Belgium) / Audi Sport Team WRT	Audi R8 LMS	4	(Belgium) Adrien de Leener	P	All
(Belgium) / Belgian Audi Club Team WRT; (Belgium) / Audi Sport Team WRT	Audi R8 LMS	4	(Netherlands) Peter Kox	P	1–3
(Belgium) / Belgian Audi Club Team WRT; (Belgium) / Audi Sport Team WRT	Audi R8 LMS	4	(Belgium) Bertrand Baguette	P	4
(Belgium) / Belgian Audi Club Team WRT; (Belgium) / Audi Sport Team WRT	Audi R8 LMS	4	(United Kingdom) Ben Barnicoat	P	5
(Belgium) / Belgian Audi Club Team WRT; (Belgium) / Audi Sport Team WRT	Audi R8 LMS	28	(United Kingdom) Will Stevens	P	1–3, 5
(Belgium) / Belgian Audi Club Team WRT; (Belgium) / Audi Sport Team WRT	Audi R8 LMS	28	(Spain) Antonio García	P	1–3
(Belgium) / Belgian Audi Club Team WRT; (Belgium) / Audi Sport Team WRT	Audi R8 LMS	28	(Switzerland) Nico Müller	P	1–2, 4
(Belgium) / Belgian Audi Club Team WRT; (Belgium) / Audi Sport Team WRT	Audi R8 LMS	28	(Germany) René Rast	P	3–4
(Belgium) / Belgian Audi Club Team WRT; (Belgium) / Audi Sport Team WRT	Audi R8 LMS	28	(Belgium) Laurens Vanthoor	P	4
(Belgium) / Belgian Audi Club Team WRT; (Belgium) / Audi Sport Team WRT	Audi R8 LMS	28	(Germany) Christopher Mies	P	5
(Belgium) / Belgian Audi Club Team WRT; (Belgium) / Audi Sport Team WRT	Audi R8 LMS	28	(United States) Connor De Phillippi	P	5
(Germany) Audi Sport Team Phoenix	Audi R8 LMS	6	(Germany) Christopher Mies	P	4
(Germany) Audi Sport Team Phoenix	Audi R8 LMS	6	(Germany) Frank Stippler	P	4
(Germany) Audi Sport Team Phoenix	Audi R8 LMS	6	(Germany) Markus Winkelhock	P	4
(United Kingdom) Bentley Team M-Sport	Bentley Continental GT3	7	(France) Vincent Abril	P	All
(United Kingdom) Bentley Team M-Sport	Bentley Continental GT3	7	(United Kingdom) Steven Kane	P	All
(United Kingdom) Bentley Team M-Sport	Bentley Continental GT3	7	(United Kingdom) Guy Smith	P	All
(United Kingdom) Bentley Team M-Sport	Bentley Continental GT3	8	(Belgium) Wolfgang Reip	P	All
(United Kingdom) Bentley Team M-Sport	Bentley Continental GT3	8	(Spain) Andy Soucek	P	All
(United Kingdom) Bentley Team M-Sport	Bentley Continental GT3	8	(Belgium) Maxime Soulet	P	All
(Italy) Ombra Racing	Lamborghini Huracán GT3	10	(Italy) Matteo Beretta	PA	All
(Italy) Ombra Racing	Lamborghini Huracán GT3	10	(Italy) Giovanni Berton	PA	All
(Italy) Ombra Racing	Lamborghini Huracán GT3	10	(Italy) Stefano Costantini	PA	1–4
(Italy) Ombra Racing	Lamborghini Huracán GT3	10	(Italy) Stefano Gattuso	PA	4
(Italy) Ombra Racing	Lamborghini Huracán GT3	10	(Italy) Alex Frassineti	PA	5
(Switzerland) Kessel Racing	Ferrari 488 GT3	11	(Italy) Alessandro Bonacini	PA	All
(Switzerland) Kessel Racing	Ferrari 488 GT3	11	(Poland) Michał Broniszewski	PA	All
(Switzerland) Kessel Racing	Ferrari 488 GT3	11	(Italy) Andrea Rizzoli	PA	All
(Switzerland) Kessel Racing	Ferrari 488 GT3	11	(Italy) Giacomo Piccini	PA	4
(Switzerland) Kessel Racing	Ferrari 458 Italia GT3	111	(Belgium) Bernard Delhez	Am	1–3
(Switzerland) Kessel Racing	Ferrari 458 Italia GT3	111	(United States) Stephen Earle	Am	1–3
(Switzerland) Kessel Racing	Ferrari 458 Italia GT3	111	(South Africa) David Perel	Am	1–3
(Switzerland) Kessel Racing	Ferrari 458 Italia GT3	888	(Russia) Vadim Gitlin	Am	All
(Switzerland) Kessel Racing	Ferrari 458 Italia GT3	888	(Australia) Liam Talbot	Am	All
(Switzerland) Kessel Racing	Ferrari 458 Italia GT3	888	(Italy) Marco Zanuttini	Am	All
(Switzerland) Kessel Racing	Ferrari 458 Italia GT3	888	(Italy) Nicola Cadei	Am	4
(Belgium) Boutsen Ginion	BMW M6 GT3	12	(France) Julien Darras	PA	All
(Belgium) Boutsen Ginion	BMW M6 GT3	12	(Luxembourg) Olivier Grotz	PA	All
(Belgium) Boutsen Ginion	BMW M6 GT3	12	(Saudi Arabia) Karim Ojjeh	PA	All
(Belgium) Boutsen Ginion	BMW M6 GT3	12	(France) Arno Santamato	PA	4
(Switzerland) Emil Frey Racing	Emil Frey GT3 Jaguar	14	(Spain) Albert Costa	P	All
(Switzerland) Emil Frey Racing	Emil Frey GT3 Jaguar	14	(Switzerland) Lorenz Frey	P	All
(Switzerland) Emil Frey Racing	Emil Frey GT3 Jaguar	14	(Monaco) Stéphane Ortelli	P	All
(Switzerland) Emil Frey Racing	Emil Frey GT3 Jaguar	114	(Switzerland) Jonathan Hirschi	P	4–5
(Switzerland) Emil Frey Racing	Emil Frey GT3 Jaguar	114	(Austria) Christian Klien	P	4–5
(Switzerland) Emil Frey Racing	Emil Frey GT3 Jaguar	114	(Finland) Markus Palttala	P	4
(Switzerland) Emil Frey Racing	Emil Frey GT3 Jaguar	114	(Austria) Norbert Siedler	P	5
(Italy) BMW Team Italia	BMW M6 GT3	15	(Italy) Stefano Colombo	PA	All
(Italy) BMW Team Italia	BMW M6 GT3	15	(Netherlands) Max Koebolt	PA	All
(Italy) BMW Team Italia	BMW M6 GT3	15	(Italy) Giorgio Roda	PA	1–4
(Italy) BMW Team Italia	BMW M6 GT3	15	(Germany) Martin Tomczyk	PA	4
(Italy) BMW Team Italia	BMW M6 GT3	15	(Italy) Stefano Comandini	PA	5
(Austria) GRT Grasser Racing Team	Lamborghini Huracán GT3	16	(Italy) Mirko Bortolotti	P	All
(Austria) GRT Grasser Racing Team	Lamborghini Huracán GT3	16	(Switzerland) Rolf Ineichen	P	All
(Austria) GRT Grasser Racing Team	Lamborghini Huracán GT3	16	(Netherlands) Jeroen Bleekemolen	P	1–4
(Austria) GRT Grasser Racing Team	Lamborghini Huracán GT3	16	(Germany) Christian Engelhart	P	5
(Austria) GRT Grasser Racing Team	Lamborghini Huracán GT3	19	(Italy) Michele Beretta	P	All
(Austria) GRT Grasser Racing Team	Lamborghini Huracán GT3	19	(Italy) Andrea Piccini	P	All
(Austria) GRT Grasser Racing Team	Lamborghini Huracán GT3	19	(Germany) Luca Stolz	P	All
(Austria) GRT Grasser Racing Team	Lamborghini Huracán GT3	63	(Italy) Diego Alessi	PA	4
(Austria) GRT Grasser Racing Team	Lamborghini Huracán GT3	63	(Denmark) Dennis Andersen	PA	4
(Austria) GRT Grasser Racing Team	Lamborghini Huracán GT3	63	(Denmark) Anders Fjordbach	PA	4
(Austria) GRT Grasser Racing Team	Lamborghini Huracán GT3	63	(Germany) Nicolas Pohler	PA	4
(United Kingdom) Nissan GT Academy Team RJN	Nissan GT-R Nismo GT3	22	(France) Romain Sarazin	PA	All
(United Kingdom) Nissan GT Academy Team RJN	Nissan GT-R Nismo GT3	22	(Australia) Matt Simmons	PA	All
(United Kingdom) Nissan GT Academy Team RJN	Nissan GT-R Nismo GT3	22	(United Kingdom) Sean Walkinshaw	PA	All
(United Kingdom) Nissan GT Academy Team RJN	Nissan GT-R Nismo GT3	22	(Mexico) Ricardo Sánchez	PA	4
(United Kingdom) Nissan GT Academy Team RJN	Nissan GT-R Nismo GT3	23	(United Kingdom) Alex Buncombe	P	All
(United Kingdom) Nissan GT Academy Team RJN	Nissan GT-R Nismo GT3	23	(Spain) Lucas Ordóñez	P	All
(United Kingdom) Nissan GT Academy Team RJN	Nissan GT-R Nismo GT3	23	(Japan) Mitsunori Takaboshi	P	All
(United Kingdom) Team Parker Racing	Bentley Continental GT3	24	(United Kingdom) Ian Loggie	PA	1–4
(United Kingdom) Team Parker Racing	Bentley Continental GT3	24	(United Kingdom) Callum MacLeod	PA	1–4
(United Kingdom) Team Parker Racing	Bentley Continental GT3	24	(United Kingdom) Tom Onslow-Cole	PA	1–4
(United Kingdom) Team Parker Racing	Bentley Continental GT3	24	(United Kingdom) Andy Meyrick	PA	4
(United Kingdom) Team Parker Racing	Bentley Continental GT3	30	(United Kingdom) Chris Harris	Am	All
(United Kingdom) Team Parker Racing	Bentley Continental GT3	30	(United Kingdom) Derek Pierce	Am	All
(United Kingdom) Team Parker Racing	Bentley Continental GT3	30	(United Kingdom) Chris Cooper	Am	1–3
(United Kingdom) Team Parker Racing	Bentley Continental GT3	30	(South Africa) David Perel	Am	4
(United Kingdom) Team Parker Racing	Bentley Continental GT3	30	(Sweden) Carl Rosenblad	Am	4
(France) Saintéloc Racing	Audi R8 LMS	25	(Italy) Marco Bonanomi	PA	All
(France) Saintéloc Racing	Audi R8 LMS	25	(France) Marc Rostan	PA	All
(France) Saintéloc Racing	Audi R8 LMS	25	(Belgium) Christian Kelders	PA	1, 3–5
(France) Saintéloc Racing	Audi R8 LMS	25	(France) Gilles Lallemant	PA	2
(France) Saintéloc Racing	Audi R8 LMS	25	(Belgium) Frédéric Bouvy	PA	4
(France) Saintéloc Racing	Audi R8 LMS	26	(France) Grégory Guilvert	P	All
(France) Saintéloc Racing	Audi R8 LMS	26	(Germany) Christopher Haase	P	All
(France) Saintéloc Racing	Audi R8 LMS	26	(France) Mike Parisy	P	All
(France) Saintéloc Racing	Audi R8 LMS ultra	27	(France) Michael Blanchemain	Am	4
(France) Saintéloc Racing	Audi R8 LMS ultra	27	(France) Jean-Paul Buffin	Am	4
(France) Saintéloc Racing	Audi R8 LMS ultra	27	(France) Valentin Hasse-Clot	Am	4
(France) Saintéloc Racing	Audi R8 LMS ultra	27	(France) Gilles Lallemant	Am	4
(Austria) Konrad Motorsport	Lamborghini Huracán GT3	29	(France) Jules Gounon	P	1–2
(Austria) Konrad Motorsport	Lamborghini Huracán GT3	29	(Austria) Christopher Zöchling	P	1–2
(Austria) Konrad Motorsport	Lamborghini Huracán GT3	29	(Germany) Christopher Brück	P	1
(Austria) Konrad Motorsport	Lamborghini Huracán GT3	29	(United Kingdom) Daniel Cammish	P	2
(Austria) Konrad Motorsport	Lamborghini Huracán GT3	29	(France) Jules Gounon	PA	4–5
(Austria) Konrad Motorsport	Lamborghini Huracán GT3	29	(Austria) Christopher Zöchling	PA	4–5
(Austria) Konrad Motorsport	Lamborghini Huracán GT3	29	(Netherlands) Rik Breukers	PA	4
(Austria) Konrad Motorsport	Lamborghini Huracán GT3	29	(Austria) Luca Rettenbacher	PA	4
(Austria) Konrad Motorsport	Lamborghini Huracán GT3	29	(Germany) Hendrik Still	PA	5
(Czech Republic) Scuderia Praha	Ferrari 488 GT3	34	(Italy) Matteo Malucelli	PA	1–4
(Czech Republic) Scuderia Praha	Ferrari 488 GT3	34	(Czech Republic) Jiří Písařík	PA	1–4
(Czech Republic) Scuderia Praha	Ferrari 488 GT3	34	(Netherlands) Stéphane Kox	PA	3
(Czech Republic) Scuderia Praha	Ferrari 488 GT3	34	(Italy) David Fumanelli	PA	4
(Czech Republic) Scuderia Praha	Ferrari 488 GT3	34	(Czech Republic) Josef Král	PA	4
(Germany) Car Collection Motorsport	Audi R8 LMS	35	(Germany) Marc Basseng	PA	5
(Germany) Car Collection Motorsport	Audi R8 LMS	35	(Austria) Horst Felbermayr Jr.	PA	5
(Germany) Car Collection Motorsport	Audi R8 LMS	35	(Germany) Andreas Weishaupt	PA	5
(Italy) Antonelli Motorsport	Lamborghini Huracán GT3	38	(Italy) Lorenzo Casè	PA	1
(Italy) Antonelli Motorsport	Lamborghini Huracán GT3	38	(Italy) Marco Magli	PA	1
(Italy) Antonelli Motorsport	Lamborghini Huracán GT3	38	(Italy) Cristian Passuti	PA	1
(Italy) Antonelli Motorsport	Lamborghini Huracán GT3	38	(Italy) Michela Cerruti	PA	3–4
(Italy) Antonelli Motorsport	Lamborghini Huracán GT3	38	(Italy) Alberto Di Folco	PA	3
(Italy) Antonelli Motorsport	Lamborghini Huracán GT3	38	(Italy) Raffaele Giannoni	PA	3
(Italy) Antonelli Motorsport	Lamborghini Huracán GT3	38	(Monaco) Cédric Sbirrazzuoli	PA	4
(Italy) Antonelli Motorsport	Lamborghini Huracán GT3	38	(Italy) Loris Spinelli	PA	4
(Italy) Antonelli Motorsport	Lamborghini Huracán GT3	38	(France) Gilles Vannelet	PA	4
(Italy) Easy Race	Ferrari 488 GT3	40	(Italy) Ferdinando Geri	PA	4
(Italy) Easy Race	Ferrari 488 GT3	40	(Italy) Daniel Mancinelli	PA	4
(Italy) Easy Race	Ferrari 488 GT3	40	(United States) Gregory Romanelli	PA	4
(Italy) Easy Race	Ferrari 488 GT3	40	(Italy) Niccolò Schirò	PA	4
(France) / CMR by Sport Garage (Note: At Round 3 cars No. 41 and 42 entered as CMR by Sport Garage, but in the Teams' championship the drivers of cars No. 41 and 42 scored points for Classic & Modern Racing. From Round 4 on both cars No. 41 and 42 entered as Classic & Modern Racing.); (France) / Classic & Modern Racing	Ferrari 458 Italia GT3	41	(France) Benjamin Lariche	PA	1
(France) / CMR by Sport Garage; (France) / Classic & Modern Racing	Ferrari 458 Italia GT3	41	(France) Dino Lunardi	PA	1
(France) / CMR by Sport Garage; (France) / Classic & Modern Racing	Ferrari 458 Italia GT3	41	(France) Theo Filler	PA	1
(France) / CMR by Sport Garage; (France) / Classic & Modern Racing	Ferrari 458 Italia GT3	41	(France) Theo Filler	Am	3
(France) / CMR by Sport Garage; (France) / Classic & Modern Racing	Ferrari 458 Italia GT3	41	(France) Nicolas Melin	Am	3
(France) / CMR by Sport Garage; (France) / Classic & Modern Racing	Ferrari 458 Italia GT3	41	(France) Romano Ricci	Am	3
(France) / CMR by Sport Garage; (France) / Classic & Modern Racing	Ferrari 458 Italia GT3	41	(France) Romain Brandela	Am	4
(France) / CMR by Sport Garage; (France) / Classic & Modern Racing	Ferrari 458 Italia GT3	41	(France) Timothé Buret	Am	4
(France) / CMR by Sport Garage; (France) / Classic & Modern Racing	Ferrari 458 Italia GT3	41	(Belgium) Bernard Delhez	Am	4
(France) / CMR by Sport Garage; (France) / Classic & Modern Racing	Ferrari 458 Italia GT3	41	(France) Mickaël Petit	Am	4
(France) / CMR by Sport Garage; (France) / Classic & Modern Racing	Ferrari 458 Italia GT3	42	(France) Thomas Nicolle	Am	1–4
(France) / CMR by Sport Garage; (France) / Classic & Modern Racing	Ferrari 458 Italia GT3	42	(France) Nyls Stievenart	Am	1–2
(France) / CMR by Sport Garage; (France) / Classic & Modern Racing	Ferrari 458 Italia GT3	42	(Germany) Jörg Viebahn	Am	1
(France) / CMR by Sport Garage; (France) / Classic & Modern Racing	Ferrari 458 Italia GT3	42	(France) Romano Ricci	Am	2
(France) / CMR by Sport Garage; (France) / Classic & Modern Racing	Ferrari 458 Italia GT3	42	(France) Romain Brandela	Am	3, 5
(France) / CMR by Sport Garage; (France) / Classic & Modern Racing	Ferrari 458 Italia GT3	42	(France) Christophe Hamon	Am	3, 5
(France) / CMR by Sport Garage; (France) / Classic & Modern Racing	Ferrari 458 Italia GT3	42	(France) Sylvain Debs	Am	4
(France) / CMR by Sport Garage; (France) / Classic & Modern Racing	Ferrari 458 Italia GT3	42	(France) David Loger	Am	4
(France) / CMR by Sport Garage; (France) / Classic & Modern Racing	Ferrari 458 Italia GT3	42	(France) Eric Mouez	Am	4
(France) / CMR by Sport Garage; (France) / Classic & Modern Racing	Ferrari 458 Italia GT3	42	(Belgium) Bernard Delhez	Am	5
Oman Racing Team	Aston Martin V12 Vantage GT3	44	(United Kingdom) Jonathan Adam	PA	All
Oman Racing Team	Aston Martin V12 Vantage GT3	44	(Oman) Ahmad Al Harthy	PA	All
Oman Racing Team	Aston Martin V12 Vantage GT3	44	(United Kingdom) Devon Modell	PA	All
Oman Racing Team	Aston Martin V12 Vantage GT3	44	(United Kingdom) Darren Turner	PA	4
(Portugal) Sports & You	Mercedes-AMG GT3	46	(Argentina) José Manuel Balbiani	Am	5
(Portugal) Sports & You	Mercedes-AMG GT3	46	(Belgium) Angélique Detavernier	Am	5
(Portugal) Sports & You	Mercedes-AMG GT3	46	(Belgium) Louis-Philippe Soenen	Am	5
(Italy) Kaspersky Motorsport (Note: Car No. 49 entered as Kaspersky Motorsport at Rounds 2, 4 and 5.) (Italy) AF Corse (Note: Only a limited number of cars per team were able to score points toward the Teams' championship. Therefore from Rounds 1 to 3 cars No. 50, 51 and 90 entered as AF Corse, but in the Teams' championship the drivers of cars No. 50, 51 and 90 scored points for Spirit of Race under Swiss licence. At Round 4 also the drivers of car No. 49 scored points for Spirit of Race. At Round 5 it were the drivers of cars No. 49, 50 and 90 that scored points for Spirit of Race.) (Austria) AT Racing (Note: Car No. 55 entered as AT Racing under Austrian licence.)	Ferrari 458 Italia GT3	49	(Russia) Alexander Moiseev	Am	All
(Italy) Kaspersky Motorsport (Italy) AF Corse (Austria) AT Racing	Ferrari 458 Italia GT3	49	(Russia) Garry Kondakov	Am	1–2
(Italy) Kaspersky Motorsport (Italy) AF Corse (Austria) AT Racing	Ferrari 458 Italia GT3	49	(Italy) Riccardo Ragazzi	Am	1–2
(Italy) Kaspersky Motorsport (Italy) AF Corse (Austria) AT Racing	Ferrari 458 Italia GT3	49	(Belgium) Stéphane Lémeret	Am	3–4
(Italy) Kaspersky Motorsport (Italy) AF Corse (Austria) AT Racing	Ferrari 458 Italia GT3	49	(Italy) Davide Rizzo	Am	4–5
(Italy) Kaspersky Motorsport (Italy) AF Corse (Austria) AT Racing	Ferrari 458 Italia GT3	49	(Portugal) Rui Águas	Am	4
(Italy) Kaspersky Motorsport (Italy) AF Corse (Austria) AT Racing	Ferrari 488 GT3	50	(Thailand) Pasin Lathouras	P	All
(Italy) Kaspersky Motorsport (Italy) AF Corse (Austria) AT Racing	Ferrari 488 GT3	50	(Italy) Alessandro Pier Guidi	P	All
(Italy) Kaspersky Motorsport (Italy) AF Corse (Austria) AT Racing	Ferrari 488 GT3	50	(Italy) Michele Rugolo	P	All
(Italy) Kaspersky Motorsport (Italy) AF Corse (Austria) AT Racing	Ferrari 488 GT3	51	(Portugal) Francisco Guedes	Am	All
(Italy) Kaspersky Motorsport (Italy) AF Corse (Austria) AT Racing	Ferrari 488 GT3	51	(United States) Peter Mann	Am	All
(Italy) Kaspersky Motorsport (Italy) AF Corse (Austria) AT Racing	Ferrari 488 GT3	51	(Italy) Rino Mastronardi	Am	All
(Italy) Kaspersky Motorsport (Italy) AF Corse (Austria) AT Racing	Ferrari 488 GT3	51	(Italy) Matteo Cressoni	Am	4
(Italy) Kaspersky Motorsport (Italy) AF Corse (Austria) AT Racing	Ferrari 488 GT3	52	(United Kingdom) Duncan Cameron	PA	1, 3–5
(Italy) Kaspersky Motorsport (Italy) AF Corse (Austria) AT Racing	Ferrari 488 GT3	52	(Republic of Ireland) Matt Griffin	PA	1, 3–5
(Italy) Kaspersky Motorsport (Italy) AF Corse (Austria) AT Racing	Ferrari 488 GT3	52	(Italy) Davide Rizzo	PA	3
(Italy) Kaspersky Motorsport (Italy) AF Corse (Austria) AT Racing	Ferrari 488 GT3	52	(Italy) Riccardo Ragazzi	PA	4
(Italy) Kaspersky Motorsport (Italy) AF Corse (Austria) AT Racing	Ferrari 488 GT3	52	(United Kingdom) Andrew Scott	PA	4
(Italy) Kaspersky Motorsport (Italy) AF Corse (Austria) AT Racing	Ferrari 488 GT3	53	(Italy) Lorenzo Bontempelli	PA	All
(Italy) Kaspersky Motorsport (Italy) AF Corse (Austria) AT Racing	Ferrari 488 GT3	53	(Japan) Motoaki Ishikawa	PA	All
(Italy) Kaspersky Motorsport (Italy) AF Corse (Austria) AT Racing	Ferrari 488 GT3	53	(Italy) Giancarlo Fisichella	PA	1–2, 4
(Italy) Kaspersky Motorsport (Italy) AF Corse (Austria) AT Racing	Ferrari 488 GT3	53	(Monaco) Olivier Beretta	PA	3–5
(Italy) Kaspersky Motorsport (Italy) AF Corse (Austria) AT Racing	Ferrari 488 GT3	55	(Italy) Francesco Castellacci	PA	4
(Italy) Kaspersky Motorsport (Italy) AF Corse (Austria) AT Racing	Ferrari 488 GT3	55	(Italy) Marco Cioci	PA	4
(Italy) Kaspersky Motorsport (Italy) AF Corse (Austria) AT Racing	Ferrari 488 GT3	55	(Switzerland) Thomas Flohr	PA	4
(Italy) Kaspersky Motorsport (Italy) AF Corse (Austria) AT Racing	Ferrari 488 GT3	55	(Italy) Piergiuseppe Perazzini	PA	4
(Italy) Kaspersky Motorsport (Italy) AF Corse (Austria) AT Racing	Ferrari 458 Italia GT3	90	(Italy) Alessandro Balzan	P	1–4
(Italy) Kaspersky Motorsport (Italy) AF Corse (Austria) AT Racing	Ferrari 458 Italia GT3	90	(Italy) Raffaele Giammaria	P	1–4
(Italy) Kaspersky Motorsport (Italy) AF Corse (Austria) AT Racing	Ferrari 458 Italia GT3	90	(Argentina) Ezequiel Pérez Companc	P	1–4
(Italy) Kaspersky Motorsport (Italy) AF Corse (Austria) AT Racing	Ferrari 458 Italia GT3	90	(Italy) Thomas Kemenater	Am	5
(Italy) Kaspersky Motorsport (Italy) AF Corse (Austria) AT Racing	Ferrari 458 Italia GT3	90	(Belgium) Stéphane Lémeret	Am	5
(Italy) Kaspersky Motorsport (Italy) AF Corse (Austria) AT Racing	Ferrari 458 Italia GT3	90	(Germany) Claudio Sdanewitsch	Am	5
(United Kingdom) Garage 59	McLaren 650S GT3	58	(United Kingdom) Rob Bell	P	All
(United Kingdom) Garage 59	McLaren 650S GT3	58	(France) Côme Ledogar	P	All
(United Kingdom) Garage 59	McLaren 650S GT3	58	(New Zealand) Shane van Gisbergen	P	1–4
(United Kingdom) Garage 59	McLaren 650S GT3	58	(United Kingdom) Duncan Tappy	P	5
(United Kingdom) Garage 59	McLaren 650S GT3	59	(Switzerland) Alex Fontana	P	All
(United Kingdom) Garage 59	McLaren 650S GT3	59	(United Kingdom) Struan Moore	P	All
(United Kingdom) Garage 59	McLaren 650S GT3	59	(United Kingdom) Andrew Watson	P	All
(United Kingdom) Garage 59	McLaren 650S GT3	60	(Brazil) Pipo Derani	P	4
(United Kingdom) Garage 59	McLaren 650S GT3	60	(Brazil) Bruno Senna	P	4
(United Kingdom) Garage 59	McLaren 650S GT3	60	(United Kingdom) Duncan Tappy	P	4
(Germany) / Black Pearl Racing (Note: Car No. 66 entered as Black Pearl Racing and cars No. 333 and 488 entered as Rinaldi Racing.); (Germany) / Rinaldi Racing	Ferrari 458 Italia GT3	66	(Germany) Alexander Mattschull	PA	1–3, 5
(Germany) / Black Pearl Racing; (Germany) / Rinaldi Racing	Ferrari 458 Italia GT3	66	(Germany) Steve Parrow	PA	1–3, 5
(Germany) / Black Pearl Racing; (Germany) / Rinaldi Racing	Ferrari 458 Italia GT3	66	(Germany) Daniel Keilwitz	PA	1–2, 5
(Germany) / Black Pearl Racing; (Germany) / Rinaldi Racing	Ferrari 458 Italia GT3	66	(Germany) Dominik Schwager	PA	3
(Germany) / Black Pearl Racing; (Germany) / Rinaldi Racing	Ferrari 458 Italia GT3	333	(Germany) Marco Seefried	P	1–2
(Germany) / Black Pearl Racing; (Germany) / Rinaldi Racing	Ferrari 458 Italia GT3	333	(Austria) Norbert Siedler	P	1–2
(Germany) / Black Pearl Racing; (Germany) / Rinaldi Racing	Ferrari 458 Italia GT3	333	(Russia) Rinat Salikhov	P	1–2
(Germany) / Black Pearl Racing; (Germany) / Rinaldi Racing	Ferrari 488 GT3	333	(Russia) Rinat Salikhov	Am	3–5
(Germany) / Black Pearl Racing; (Germany) / Rinaldi Racing	Ferrari 488 GT3	333	(Germany) Pierre Ehret	Am	3–5
(Germany) / Black Pearl Racing; (Germany) / Rinaldi Racing	Ferrari 488 GT3	333	(Germany) Alexander Mattschull	Am	4
(Germany) / Black Pearl Racing; (Germany) / Rinaldi Racing	Ferrari 488 GT3	333	(Germany) Marco Seefried	Am	4
(Germany) / Black Pearl Racing; (Germany) / Rinaldi Racing	Ferrari 488 GT3	488	(Germany) Pierre Ehret	Am	1–2
(Germany) / Black Pearl Racing; (Germany) / Rinaldi Racing	Ferrari 488 GT3	488	(Belgium) Stef Van Campenhout	Am	1–2
(Slovakia) ARC Bratislava	Lamborghini Huracán GT3	69	(Slovakia) Miroslav Konôpka	Am	All
(Slovakia) ARC Bratislava	Lamborghini Huracán GT3	69	(Poland) Andrzej Lewandowski	Am	All
(Slovakia) ARC Bratislava	Lamborghini Huracán GT3	69	(Poland) Teodor Myszkowski	Am	All
(Slovakia) ARC Bratislava	Lamborghini Huracán GT3	69	(Slovakia) Zdeno Mikuláško	Am	4
(Czech Republic) ISR	Audi R8 LMS	74	(Switzerland) Philippe Giauque	PA	All
(Czech Republic) ISR	Audi R8 LMS	74	(France) Henry Hassid	PA	All
(Czech Republic) ISR	Audi R8 LMS	74	(France) Franck Perera	PA	All
(Czech Republic) ISR	Audi R8 LMS	74	(France) Nicolas Lapierre	PA	4
(Czech Republic) ISR	Audi R8 LMS	75	(Czech Republic) Filip Salaquarda	P	All
(Czech Republic) ISR	Audi R8 LMS	75	(Philippines) Marlon Stöckinger	P	All
(Czech Republic) ISR	Audi R8 LMS	75	(Germany) Frank Stippler	P	1–3, 5
(Czech Republic) ISR	Audi R8 LMS	75	(Italy) Edoardo Mortara	P	4
(France) IMSA Performance	Porsche 911 GT3 R	76	(France) Thierry Cornac	PA	All
(France) IMSA Performance	Porsche 911 GT3 R	76	(France) Raymond Narac	PA	All
(France) IMSA Performance	Porsche 911 GT3 R	76	(France) Maxime Jousse	PA	1–4
(France) IMSA Performance	Porsche 911 GT3 R	76	(France) Patrick Pilet	PA	4
(France) IMSA Performance	Porsche 911 GT3 R	76	(France) Mathieu Jaminet	PA	5
(Germany) Attempto Racing	Porsche 911 GT3 R	77	(France) Nicolas Armindo	PA	All
(Germany) Attempto Racing	Porsche 911 GT3 R	77	(Germany) Jürgen Häring	PA	All
(Germany) Attempto Racing	Porsche 911 GT3 R	77	(France) Clément Mateu	PA	All
(Germany) Attempto Racing	Porsche 911 GT3 R	77	(France) Kévin Estre	PA	4
(Germany) Attempto Racing	Lamborghini Huracán GT3	100	(Netherlands) Jeroen Mul	PA	All
(Germany) Attempto Racing	Lamborghini Huracán GT3	100	(Netherlands) Max van Splunteren	PA	All
(Germany) Attempto Racing	Lamborghini Huracán GT3	100	(Belgium) Louis Machiels	PA	1–2, 4–5
(Germany) Attempto Racing	Lamborghini Huracán GT3	100	(Netherlands) Paul van Splunteren	PA	3
(Germany) Attempto Racing	Lamborghini Huracán GT3	100	(Italy) Giovanni Venturini	PA	4
(Germany) Attempto Racing	Lamborghini Huracán GT3	101	(Switzerland) Patric Niederhauser	P	All
(Germany) Attempto Racing	Lamborghini Huracán GT3	101	(Italy) Daniel Zampieri	P	All
(Germany) Attempto Racing	Lamborghini Huracán GT3	101	(Italy) Fabio Babini	P	1–4
(Germany) Attempto Racing	Lamborghini Huracán GT3	101	(Germany) Christian Mamerow	P	5
(United Kingdom) Barwell Motorsport	Lamborghini Huracán GT3	78	(Russia) Leo Machitski	PA	All
(United Kingdom) Barwell Motorsport	Lamborghini Huracán GT3	78	(Italy) Marco Mapelli	PA	All
(United Kingdom) Barwell Motorsport	Lamborghini Huracán GT3	78	(United Kingdom) Marco Attard	PA	1, 4
(United Kingdom) Barwell Motorsport	Lamborghini Huracán GT3	78	(United Kingdom) Phil Keen	PA	2–3, 5
(United Kingdom) Barwell Motorsport	Lamborghini Huracán GT3	78	(United Kingdom) Tom Kimber-Smith	PA	4
(United Kingdom) Barwell Motorsport	Lamborghini Huracán GT3	666	(United Kingdom) Joe Osborne	PA	1–2, 4
(United Kingdom) Barwell Motorsport	Lamborghini Huracán GT3	666	(United Kingdom) Richard Abra	PA	1–2
(United Kingdom) Barwell Motorsport	Lamborghini Huracán GT3	666	(United Kingdom) Mark Poole	PA	1–2
(United Kingdom) Barwell Motorsport	Lamborghini Huracán GT3	666	(United Kingdom) Oliver Gavin	PA	4
(United Kingdom) Barwell Motorsport	Lamborghini Huracán GT3	666	(United Kingdom) Phil Keen	PA	4
(United Kingdom) Barwell Motorsport	Lamborghini Huracán GT3	666	(United Kingdom) Jon Minshaw	PA	4
(Germany) SPS Automotive Performance	Mercedes-AMG GT3	80	(Germany) Lance David Arnold	P	3
(Germany) SPS Automotive Performance	Mercedes-AMG GT3	80	(Germany) Alex Müller	P	3
(Germany) SPS Automotive Performance	Mercedes-AMG GT3	80	(Germany) Valentin Pierburg	P	3
(Germany) / HTP Motorsport (Note: Car No. 84 entered as HTP Motorsport from Round 1 to 3, but at Rounds 4 and 5 it entered as AMG - Team HTP Motorsport. Car No. 85 entered as HTP Motorsport and car No. 86 entered as AMG - Team HTP Motorsport.); (Germany) / AMG - Team HTP Motorsport	Mercedes-AMG GT3	84	(Austria) Dominik Baumann	P	All
(Germany) / HTP Motorsport; (Germany) / AMG - Team HTP Motorsport	Mercedes-AMG GT3	84	(Germany) Maximilian Buhk	P	All
(Germany) / HTP Motorsport; (Germany) / AMG - Team HTP Motorsport	Mercedes-AMG GT3	84	(Malaysia) Jazeman Jaafar	P	All
(Germany) / HTP Motorsport; (Germany) / AMG - Team HTP Motorsport	Mercedes-AMG GT3	85	(United Kingdom) Luciano Bacheta	P	All
(Germany) / HTP Motorsport; (Germany) / AMG - Team HTP Motorsport	Mercedes-AMG GT3	85	(Netherlands) Indy Dontje	P	All
(Germany) / HTP Motorsport; (Germany) / AMG - Team HTP Motorsport	Mercedes-AMG GT3	85	(Austria) Clemens Schmid	P	All
(Germany) / HTP Motorsport; (Germany) / AMG - Team HTP Motorsport	Mercedes-AMG GT3	86	(Germany) Thomas Jäger	P	3–4
(Germany) / HTP Motorsport; (Germany) / AMG - Team HTP Motorsport	Mercedes-AMG GT3	86	(Germany) Christian Hohenadel	P	3
(Germany) / HTP Motorsport; (Germany) / AMG - Team HTP Motorsport	Mercedes-AMG GT3	86	(Netherlands) Jules Szymkowiak	P	3
(Germany) / HTP Motorsport; (Germany) / AMG - Team HTP Motorsport	Mercedes-AMG GT3	86	(Germany) Maximilian Götz	P	4
(Germany) / HTP Motorsport; (Germany) / AMG - Team HTP Motorsport	Mercedes-AMG GT3	86	(United Kingdom) Gary Paffett	P	4
(France) / AKKA ASP (Note: Cars No. 87 and 89 entered as AKKA ASP and car No. 88 entered as AMG - Team AKKA ASP.); (France) / AMG - Team AKKA ASP	Mercedes-AMG GT3	87	(France) Jean-Luc Beaubelique	Am	1–3, 5
(France) / AKKA ASP; (France) / AMG - Team AKKA ASP	Mercedes-AMG GT3	87	(France) Maurice Ricci	Am	1–3, 5
(France) / AKKA ASP; (France) / AMG - Team AKKA ASP	Mercedes-AMG GT3	87	(France) Gilles Vannelet	Am	1–3, 5
(France) / AKKA ASP; (France) / AMG - Team AKKA ASP	Mercedes-AMG GT3	88	(France) Tristan Vautier	P	3–4
(France) / AKKA ASP; (France) / AMG - Team AKKA ASP	Mercedes-AMG GT3	88	(Netherlands) Renger van der Zande	P	3–4
(France) / AKKA ASP; (France) / AMG - Team AKKA ASP	Mercedes-AMG GT3	88	(France) Morgan Moullin-Traffort	P	3
(France) / AKKA ASP; (France) / AMG - Team AKKA ASP	Mercedes-AMG GT3	88	(Sweden) Felix Rosenqvist	P	4
(France) / AKKA ASP; (France) / AMG - Team AKKA ASP	Mercedes-AMG GT3	89	(France) Laurent Cazenave	PA	All
(France) / AKKA ASP; (France) / AMG - Team AKKA ASP	Mercedes-AMG GT3	89	(United Kingdom) Michael Lyons	PA	All
(France) / AKKA ASP; (France) / AMG - Team AKKA ASP	Mercedes-AMG GT3	89	(Switzerland) Daniele Perfetti	PA	All
(France) / AKKA ASP; (France) / AMG - Team AKKA ASP	Mercedes-AMG GT3	89	(France) Morgan Moullin-Traffort	PA	4
(Germany) Zakspeed	Mercedes-AMG GT3	91	(Canada) Jean-Frédéric Laberge	P	1
(Germany) Zakspeed	Mercedes-AMG GT3	91	(Canada) Alex Tagliani	P	1
(Germany) Zakspeed	Mercedes-AMG GT3	91	(Canada) Darryl O'Young	P	1
(Germany) Zakspeed	Mercedes-AMG GT3	91	(Germany) Sebastian Asch	P	5
(Germany) Zakspeed	Mercedes-AMG GT3	91	(Germany) Luca Ludwig	P	5
(Germany) Zakspeed	Mercedes-AMG GT3	91	(Switzerland) Nikolaj Rogivue	P	5
(Germany) Rowe Racing	BMW M6 GT3	98	(Netherlands) Stef Dusseldorp	P	1–2, 4–5
(Germany) Rowe Racing	BMW M6 GT3	98	(Germany) Lucas Luhr	P	1, 3
(Germany) Rowe Racing	BMW M6 GT3	98	(Germany) Klaus Graf	P	1
(Germany) Rowe Racing	BMW M6 GT3	98	(Germany) Jens Klingmann	P	2–3
(Germany) Rowe Racing	BMW M6 GT3	98	(Netherlands) Nick Catsburg	P	2, 4
(Germany) Rowe Racing	BMW M6 GT3	98	(Germany) Dirk Werner	P	3–4
(Germany) Rowe Racing	BMW M6 GT3	98	(United Kingdom) Tom Blomqvist	P	5
(Germany) Rowe Racing	BMW M6 GT3	98	(Germany) Martin Tomczyk	P	5
(Germany) Rowe Racing	BMW M6 GT3	99	(Austria) Philipp Eng	P	All
(Germany) Rowe Racing	BMW M6 GT3	99	(United Kingdom) Alexander Sims	P	All
(Germany) Rowe Racing	BMW M6 GT3	99	(Germany) Dirk Werner	P	1
(Germany) Rowe Racing	BMW M6 GT3	99	(Belgium) Maxime Martin	P	2, 4
(Germany) Rowe Racing	BMW M6 GT3	99	(Netherlands) Stef Dusseldorp	P	3
(Germany) Rowe Racing	BMW M6 GT3	99	(Netherlands) Nick Catsburg	P	5
(Australia) Lago Racing	Lamborghini Gallardo R-EX	132	(Australia) Roger Lago	PA	4
(Australia) Lago Racing	Lamborghini Gallardo R-EX	132	(Australia) Steve Owen	PA	4
(Australia) Lago Racing	Lamborghini Gallardo R-EX	132	(Australia) David Russell	PA	4
(Australia) Lago Racing	Lamborghini Gallardo R-EX	132	(Australia) Jonathon Webb	PA	4
Group N entries are ineligible to score points
(Belgium) SpeedLover	Porsche 991 GT3 Cup	230	(Belgium) Wim Meulders	N	4
(Belgium) SpeedLover	Porsche 991 GT3 Cup	230	(Belgium) Grégory Paisse	N	4
(Belgium) SpeedLover	Porsche 991 GT3 Cup	230	(Belgium) Pierre-Yves Paque	N	4
(Belgium) SpeedLover	Porsche 991 GT3 Cup	230	(France) Philippe Richard	N	4
(Switzerland) RMS	Porsche 991 GT3 Cup	911	(France) Jean-Marc Bachelier	N	4
(Switzerland) RMS	Porsche 991 GT3 Cup	911	(United States) Howard Blank	N	4
(Switzerland) RMS	Porsche 991 GT3 Cup	911	(France) Yannick Mallegol	N	4
(Switzerland) RMS	Porsche 991 GT3 Cup	911	(Monaco) Fabrice Notari	N	4

Icon	Class
P	Pro Cup
PA	Pro-Am Cup
Am	Am Cup
N	Group N

== Race results ==
Bold indicates overall winner.

Event	Circuit	Pole position	Pro Winners	Pro-Am Winners	Am Winners
1	(Italy) Monza	(Germany) No. 84 HTP Motorsport	**(United Kingdom) No. 58 Garage 59**	(Switzerland) No. 11 Kessel Racing	(France) No. 87 AKKA ASP
1	(Italy) Monza	(Austria) Dominik Baumann (Germany) Maximilian Buhk (Malaysia) Jazeman Jaafar	**(United Kingdom) Rob Bell** **(New Zealand) Shane van Gisbergen** **(France) Côme Ledogar**	(Italy) Alessandro Bonacini (Poland) Michał Broniszewski (Italy) Andrea Rizzoli	(France) Jean-Luc Beaubelique (France) Maurice Ricci (France) Gilles Vannelet
2	(United Kingdom) Silverstone	(Austria) No. 16 GRT Grasser Racing Team	**(Germany) No. 84 HTP Motorsport**	(Germany) No. 56 Black Falcon	(Germany) No. 488 Rinaldi Racing
2	(United Kingdom) Silverstone	(Netherlands) Jeroen Bleekemolen (Italy) Mirko Bortolotti (Switzerland) Rolf Ineichen	**(Austria) Dominik Baumann** **(Germany) Maximilian Buhk** **(Malaysia) Jazeman Jaafar**	(Germany) Maro Engel (United Kingdom) Oliver Morley (Spain) Miguel Toril	(Belgium) Stef Van Campenhout (Germany) Pierre Ehret
3	(France) Paul Ricard	(Italy) No. 50 AF Corse	**(United Kingdom) No. 58 Garage 59**	(Switzerland) No. 11 Kessel Racing	(Switzerland) No. 888 Kessel Racing
3	(France) Paul Ricard	(Thailand) Pasin Lathouras (Italy) Alessandro Pier Guidi (Italy) Michele Rugolo	**(United Kingdom) Rob Bell** **(New Zealand) Shane van Gisbergen** **(France) Côme Ledogar**	(Italy) Alessandro Bonacini (Poland) Michał Broniszewski (Italy) Andrea Rizzoli	(Russia) Vadim Gitlin (Australia) Liam Talbot (Italy) Marco Zanuttini
4	(Belgium) Spa-Francorchamps	(Belgium) No. 28 Audi Sport Team WRT	**(Germany) No. 99 Rowe Racing**	(France) No. 76 IMSA Performance	(Switzerland) No. 888 Kessel Racing
4	(Belgium) Spa-Francorchamps	(Switzerland) Nico Müller (Germany) René Rast (Belgium) Laurens Vanthoor	**(Austria) Philipp Eng** **(Belgium) Maxime Martin** **(United Kingdom) Alexander Sims**	(France) Thierry Cornac (France) Maxime Jousse (France) Raymond Narac (France) Patrick Pilet	(Italy) Nicola Cadei (Russia) Vadim Gitlin (Australia) Liam Talbot (Italy) Marco Zanuttini
5	(Germany) Nürburgring	(Austria) No. 19 GRT Grasser Racing Team	**(Austria) No. 16 GRT Grasser Racing Team**	(Germany) No. 66 Black Pearl Racing	(France) No. 87 AKKA ASP
5	(Germany) Nürburgring	(Italy) Michele Beretta (Italy) Andrea Piccini (Germany) Luca Stolz	**(Italy) Mirko Bortolotti** **(Germany) Christian Engelhart** **(Switzerland) Rolf Ineichen**	(Germany) Daniel Keilwitz (Germany) Alexander Mattschull (Germany) Steve Parrow	(France) Jean-Luc Beaubelique (France) Maurice Ricci (France) Gilles Vannelet

== Championship standings ==
Scoring system

Championship points were awarded for the first ten positions in each race. The pole-sitter also received one point and entries were required to complete 75% of the winning car's race distance in order to be classified and earn points. Individual drivers were required to participate for a minimum of 25 minutes in order to earn championship points in any race.

Race points

Position	**1st**	**2nd**	**3rd**	**4th**	**5th**	**6th**	**7th**	**8th**	**9th**	**10th**	**Pole**
Points	25	18	15	12	10	8	6	4	2	1	1

1000 km Paul Ricard points

Position	**1st**	**2nd**	**3rd**	**4th**	**5th**	**6th**	**7th**	**8th**	**9th**	**10th**	**Pole**
Points	33	24	19	15	12	9	6	4	2	1	1

24 Hours of Spa points

Points were awarded after six hours, after twelve hours and at the finish.

Position	**1st**	**2nd**	**3rd**	**4th**	**5th**	**6th**	**7th**	**8th**	**9th**	**10th**	**Pole**
Points after 6hrs/12hrs	12	9	7	6	5	4	3	2	1	0	1
Points at the finish	25	18	15	12	10	8	6	4	2	1	1

=== Drivers' championships ===
==== Overall ====
Pos.	Driver	Team	MNZ (Italy)	SIL (United Kingdom)	LEC (France)	SPA (Belgium)			NÜR (Germany)	Points
Pos.	Driver	Team	MNZ (Italy)	SIL (United Kingdom)	LEC (France)	6hrs	12hrs	24hrs	NÜR (Germany)	Points
1	(United Kingdom) Rob Bell (France) Côme Ledogar	(United Kingdom) Garage 59	1	6	1	8	39	31	30	68
1	(New Zealand) Shane van Gisbergen	(United Kingdom) Garage 59	1	6	1	8	39	31		68
2	(Austria) Dominik Baumann (Germany) Maximilian Buhk (Malaysia) Jazeman Jaafar	(Germany) HTP Motorsport	**2**	1	Ret					67
2	(Austria) Dominik Baumann (Germany) Maximilian Buhk (Malaysia) Jazeman Jaafar	(Germany) AMG - Team HTP Motorsport				13	7	6	4	67
3	(Belgium) Wolfgang Reip (Spain) Andy Soucek (Belgium) Maxime Soulet	(United Kingdom) Bentley Team M-Sport	3	46	4	5	1	4	20	59
4	(Austria) Philipp Eng (United Kingdom) Alexander Sims	(Germany) Rowe Racing	Ret	4	Ret	1	4	1	10	56
5	(Belgium) Maxime Martin	(Germany) Rowe Racing		4		1	4	1		55
6	(Belgium) Laurens Vanthoor	(Belgium) Belgian Audi Club Team WRT	9	2	19				2	54
6	(Belgium) Laurens Vanthoor	(Belgium) Audi Sport Team WRT				**42**	20	3		54
7	(Italy) Mirko Bortolotti (Switzerland) Rolf Ineichen	(Austria) GRT Grasser Racing Team	8	**3**	Ret	10	6	11	1	49
8	(Belgium) Dries Vanthoor (Belgium) Frédéric Vervisch	(Belgium) Belgian Audi Club Team WRT	9	2	19	3	35	29	2	45
9	(United Kingdom) Alex Buncombe (Spain) Lucas Ordóñez (Japan) Mitsunori Takaboshi	(United Kingdom) Nissan GT Academy Team RJN	4	Ret	5	38	33	44	3	39
10	(Switzerland) Nico Müller	(Belgium) Belgian Audi Club Team WRT	6	9						26
10	(Switzerland) Nico Müller	(Belgium) Audi Sport Team WRT				**42**	20	3		26
11	(Germany) Christian Engelhart	(Austria) GRT Grasser Racing Team							1	25
12	(Thailand) Pasin Lathouras (Italy) Alessandro Pier Guidi (Italy) Michele Rugolo	(Italy) AF Corse	Ret	16	**2**	32	10	16	32	25
13	(Netherlands) Jeroen Bleekemolen	(Austria) GRT Grasser Racing Team	8	**3**	Ret	10	6	11		24
14	(France) Grégory Guilvert (Germany) Christopher Haase (France) Mike Parisy	(France) Saintéloc Racing	12	7	6	11	13	7	12	21
15	(Brazil) Rodrigo Baptista	(Belgium) Belgian Audi Club Team WRT	16	20	3	30	19	12	46	19
16	(Portugal) Filipe Albuquerque	(Belgium) Belgian Audi Club Team WRT	16	20	3	30	19	12		19
17	(Denmark) Jan Magnussen	(Belgium) Belgian Audi Club Team WRT			3					19
18	(United Kingdom) Will Stevens	(Belgium) Belgian Audi Club Team WRT	6	9	9	3	35	29	Ret	19
19	(Germany) Frank Stippler	(Czech Republic) ISR	31	15	11				11	18
19	(Germany) Frank Stippler	(Germany) Audi Sport Team Phoenix				2	2	50		18
20	(Germany) Christopher Mies	(Germany) Audi Sport Team Phoenix				2	2	50		18
20	(Germany) Christopher Mies	(Belgium) Belgian Audi Club Team WRT							Ret	18
21	(Germany) Markus Winkelhock	(Germany) Audi Sport Team Phoenix				2	2	50		18
22	(France) Tristan Vautier (Netherlands) Renger van der Zande	(France) AMG - Team AKKA ASP			Ret	26	12	2		18
23	(Sweden) Felix Rosenqvist	(France) AMG - Team AKKA ASP				26	12	2		18
24	(Germany) René Rast	(Belgium) Belgian Audi Club Team WRT			9					18
24	(Germany) René Rast	(Belgium) Audi Sport Team WRT				**42**	20	3		18
25	(France) Vincent Abril (United Kingdom) Steven Kane (United Kingdom) Guy Smith	(United Kingdom) Bentley Team M-Sport	14	8	13	7	3	18	9	16
26	(Italy) Alessandro Bonacini (Poland) Michał Broniszewski (Italy) Andrea Rizzoli	(Switzerland) Kessel Racing	5	29	7	23	18	22	14	16
27	(Italy) Michele Beretta (Italy) Andrea Piccini (Germany) Luca Stolz	(Austria) GRT Grasser Racing Team	40	21	40	4	24	15	**6**	15
28	(Germany) Thomas Jäger	(Germany) AMG - Team HTP Motorsport			Ret	22	8	5		12
29	(Germany) Maximilian Götz (United Kingdom) Gary Paffett	(Germany) AMG - Team HTP Motorsport				22	8	5		12
30	(Spain) Antonio García	(Belgium) Belgian Audi Club Team WRT	6	9	9					12
31	(Germany) Alexander Mattschull	(Germany) Black Pearl Racing	11	36	38				5	10
31	(Germany) Alexander Mattschull	(Germany) Rinaldi Racing				54	45	36		10
32	(Germany) Steve Parrow	(Germany) Black Pearl Racing	11	36	38				5	10
33	(Germany) Daniel Keilwitz	(Germany) Black Pearl Racing	11	36					5	10
34	(United Kingdom) Luciano Bacheta (Netherlands) Indy Dontje (Austria) Clemens Schmid	(Germany) HTP Motorsport	21	5	43	47	40	21	25	10
35	(Germany) Pierre Kaffer (Belgium) Adrien de Leener	(Belgium) Belgian Audi Club Team WRT	26	23	Ret	6	15	8	29	8
36	(Belgium) Bertrand Baguette	(Belgium) Belgian Audi Club Team WRT				6	15	8		8
37	(Czech Republic) Filip Salaquarda (Philippines) Marlon Stöckinger	(Czech Republic) ISR	31	15	11	24	5	9	11	7
38	(Italy) Edoardo Mortara	(Czech Republic) ISR				24	5	9		7
39	(United Kingdom) Adam Christodoulou (Germany) Hubert Haupt (Sweden) Andreas Simonsen	(Germany) AMG - Team Black Falcon	7							6
39	(United Kingdom) Adam Christodoulou (Germany) Hubert Haupt (Sweden) Andreas Simonsen	(Germany) Black Falcon		11	34	12	14	33	18	6
40	(Austria) Norbert Siedler	(Germany) Rinaldi Racing	17	Ret						6
40	(Austria) Norbert Siedler	(Switzerland) Emil Frey Racing							7	6
41	(Switzerland) Jonathan Hirschi (Austria) Christian Klien	(Switzerland) Emil Frey Racing				55	57	49	7	6
42	(Netherlands) Robin Frijns (United Kingdom) Stuart Leonard (United Kingdom) Michael Meadows	(Belgium) Belgian Audi Club Team WRT	33	13	Ret	19	11	Ret	8	4
43	(United Kingdom) Duncan Cameron (Republic of Ireland) Matt Griffin	(Italy) AF Corse	Ret		8	20	30	46	17	4
44	(Italy) Davide Rizzo	(Italy) AF Corse			8					4
44	(Italy) Davide Rizzo	(Italy) Kaspersky Motorsport				40	48	Ret	48	4
45	(Netherlands) Nick Catsburg	(Germany) Rowe Racing		12		9	16	41	10	2
46	(Switzerland) Patric Niederhauser (Italy) Daniel Zampieri	(Germany) Attempto Racing	19	10	10	21	23	14	22	2
47	(Italy) Fabio Babini	(Germany) Attempto Racing	19	10	10	21	23	14		2
48	(Netherlands) Stef Dusseldorp	(Germany) Rowe Racing	Ret	12	Ret	9	16	41	15	1
49	(Switzerland) Philippe Giauque (France) Henry Hassid (France) Franck Perera	(Czech Republic) ISR	15	19	15	27	9	13	16	1
50	(France) Nicolas Lapierre	(Czech Republic) ISR				27	9	13		1
51	(Germany) Dirk Werner	(Germany) Rowe Racing	Ret		Ret	9	16	41		1
52	(France) Thierry Cornac (France) Raymond Narac	(France) IMSA Performance	25	42	23	29	21	10	41	1
53	(France) Maxime Jousse	(France) IMSA Performance	25	42	23	29	21	10		1
54	(France) Patrick Pilet	(France) IMSA Performance				29	21	10		1
55	(Italy) Lorenzo Bontempelli (Japan) Motoaki Ishikawa	(Italy) AF Corse	10	34	25	65	65	Ret	37	1
56	(Italy) Giancarlo Fisichella	(Italy) AF Corse	10	34		65	65	Ret		1
	(Brazil) Sérgio Jimenez	(Belgium) Belgian Audi Club Team WRT	16	20		30	19	12	46	0
	(United Kingdom) Phil Keen	(United Kingdom) Barwell Motorsport		Ret	12	25	28	17	24	0
	(Russia) Leo Machitski (Italy) Marco Mapelli	(United Kingdom) Barwell Motorsport	42	Ret	12	36	32	25	24	0
	(Germany) Jens Klingmann	(Germany) Rowe Racing		12	Ret					0
	(United Kingdom) Jonathan Adam (Oman) Ahmad Al Harthy (United Kingdom) Devon Modell	(United Kingdom) Oman Racing Team	13	18	33	14	44	24	26	0
	(Germany) Sebastian Asch (Germany) Luca Ludwig (Switzerland) Nikolaj Rogivue	(Germany) Zakspeed							13	0
	(Switzerland) Alex Fontana (United Kingdom) Struan Moore (United Kingdom) Andrew Watson	(United Kingdom) Garage 59	36	22	14	18	61	Ret	Ret	0
	(United Kingdom) Darren Turner	(United Kingdom) Oman Racing Team				14	44	24		0
	(Italy) Alessandro Balzan (Italy) Raffaele Giammaria (Argentina) Ezequiel Pérez Companc	(Italy) AF Corse	Ret	14	Ret	46	43	27		0
	(Netherlands) Max van Splunteren	(Germany) Attempto Racing	23	44	16	15	26	52	49	0
	(Netherlands) Jeroen Mul	(Germany) Attempto Racing	23	44	16	15	26	52	WD	0
	(Belgium) Louis Machiels	(Germany) Attempto Racing	23	44		15	26	52	49	0
	(Italy) Giovanni Venturini	(Germany) Attempto Racing				15	26	52		0
	(Germany) Martin Tomczyk	(Italy) BMW Team Italia				62	63	Ret		0
	(Germany) Martin Tomczyk	(Germany) Rowe Racing							15	0
	(United Kingdom) Tom Blomqvist	(Germany) Rowe Racing							15	0
	(France) Laurent Cazenave (United Kingdom) Michael Lyons (Switzerland) Daniele Perfetti	(France) AKKA ASP	41	25	18	16	17	19	42	0
	(France) Morgan Moullin-Traffort	(France) AMG - Team AKKA ASP			Ret					0
	(France) Morgan Moullin-Traffort	(France) AKKA ASP				16	17	19		0
	(Netherlands) Paul van Splunteren	(Germany) Attempto Racing			16					0
	(Germany) Maro Engel	(Germany) Black Falcon	18	17	17				21	0
	(Germany) Maro Engel	(Germany) AMG - Team Black Falcon				45	27	20		0
	(United Kingdom) Oliver Morley (Spain) Miguel Toril	(Germany) Black Falcon	18	17	17	41	46	26	21	0
	(Spain) Albert Costa (Switzerland) Lorenz Frey (Monaco) Stéphane Ortelli	(Switzerland) Emil Frey Racing	20	43	42	17	22	53	Ret	0
	(United Kingdom) Joe Osborne	(United Kingdom) Barwell Motorsport	24	32		25	28	17		0
	(United Kingdom) Oliver Gavin (United Kingdom) Jon Minshaw	(United Kingdom) Barwell Motorsport				25	28	17		0
	(Russia) Rinat Salikhov	(Germany) Rinaldi Racing	17	Ret	Ret	54	45	36	36	0
	(Germany) Marco Seefried	(Germany) Rinaldi Racing	17	Ret		54	45	36		0
	(Italy) Giacomo Piccini	(Switzerland) Kessel Racing				23	18	22		0
	(France) Gilles Vannelet	(France) AKKA ASP	27	37	24				19	0
	(France) Gilles Vannelet	(Italy) Antonelli Motorsport				33	41	28		0
	(France) Jean-Luc Beaubelique (France) Maurice Ricci	(France) AKKA ASP	27	37	24				19	0
	(Netherlands) Yelmer Buurman (Germany) Bernd Schneider	(Germany) AMG - Team Black Falcon			35	45	27	20		0
	(Italy) Riccardo Ragazzi	(Italy) AF Corse	37			20	30	46		0
	(Italy) Riccardo Ragazzi	(Italy) Kaspersky Motorsport		41						0
	(United Kingdom) Andrew Scott	(Italy) AF Corse				20	30	46		0
	(France) Julien Darras (Luxembourg) Olivier Grotz (Saudi Arabia) Karim Ojjeh	(Belgium) Boutsen Ginion	39	35	20	59	58	Ret	35	0
	(Germany) Lance David Arnold (Germany) Alex Müller (Germany) Valentin Pierburg	(Germany) SPS Automotive Performance			21					0
	(Italy) Matteo Beretta (Italy) Giovanni Berton	(Italy) Ombra Racing	22	26	41	63	60	45	23	0
	(Italy) Stefano Costantini	(Italy) Ombra Racing	22	26	41	63	60	45		0
	(Russia) Vadim Gitlin (Australia) Liam Talbot (Italy) Marco Zanuttini	(Switzerland) Kessel Racing	Ret	45	22	43	36	32	43	0
	(Germany) Christian Mamerow	(Germany) Attempto Racing							22	0
	(Italy) Matteo Malucelli (Czech Republic) Jiří Písařík	(Czech Republic) Scuderia Praha	Ret	31	Ret	35	25	23		0
	(Italy) David Fumanelli (Czech Republic) Josef Král	(Czech Republic) Scuderia Praha				35	25	23		0
	(Netherlands) Peter Kox	(Belgium) Belgian Audi Club Team WRT	26	23	Ret					0
	(Italy) Alex Frassineti	(Italy) Ombra Racing							23	0
	(France) Jules Gounon (Austria) Christopher Zöchling	(Austria) Konrad Motorsport	Ret	24		28	29	30	27	0
	(United Kingdom) Richard Abra (United Kingdom) Mark Poole	(United Kingdom) Barwell Motorsport	24	32						0
	(United Kingdom) Daniel Cammish	(Austria) Konrad Motorsport		24						0
	(United Kingdom) Marco Attard	(United Kingdom) Barwell Motorsport	42			36	32	25		0
	(United Kingdom) Tom Kimber-Smith	(United Kingdom) Barwell Motorsport				36	32	25		0
	(Monaco) Olivier Beretta	(Italy) AF Corse			25	65	65	Ret	37	0
	(Saudi Arabia) Abdulaziz Bin Turki Al Faisal	(Germany) AMG - Team Black Falcon			35					0
	(Saudi Arabia) Abdulaziz Bin Turki Al Faisal	(Germany) Black Falcon				41	46	26		0
	(Italy) Marco Bonanomi (France) Marc Rostan	(France) Saintéloc Racing	Ret	39	26	57	51	43	44	0
	(Spain) Daniel Juncadella	(Germany) Black Falcon				41	46	26		0
	(Belgium) Christian Kelders	(France) Saintéloc Racing	Ret		26	57	51	43	44	0
	(United Kingdom) Ian Loggie (United Kingdom) Callum MacLeod (United Kingdom) Tom Onslow-Cole	(United Kingdom) Team Parker Racing	35	27	Ret	37	62	Ret		0
	(France) Thomas Nicolle	(France) CMR by Sport Garage	38	47	27					0
	(France) Thomas Nicolle	(France) Classic & Modern Racing				52	59	Ret		0
	(France) Romain Brandela	(France) CMR by Sport Garage			27					0
	(France) Romain Brandela	(France) Classic & Modern Racing				51	50	Ret	Ret	0
	(France) Christophe Hamon	(France) CMR by Sport Garage			27					0
	(France) Christophe Hamon	(France) Classic & Modern Racing							Ret	0
	(Germany) Hendrik Still	(Austria) Konrad Motorsport							27	0
	(Netherlands) Rik Breukers (Austria) Luca Rettenbacher	(Austria) Konrad Motorsport				28	29	30		0
	(Italy) Stefano Colombo (Netherlands) Max Koebolt	(Italy) BMW Team Italia	Ret	30	30	62	63	Ret	28	0
	(France) Romain Sarazin (Australia) Matt Simmons (United Kingdom) Sean Walkinshaw	(United Kingdom) Nissan GT Academy Team RJN	30	28	37	39	49	37	31	0
	(Germany) Pierre Ehret	(Germany) Rinaldi Racing	28	33	Ret	54	45	36	36	0
	(Italy) Michela Cerruti	(Italy) Antonelli Motorsport			39	33	41	28		0
	(Monaco) Cédric Sbirrazzuoli (Italy) Loris Spinelli	(Italy) Antonelli Motorsport				33	41	28		0
	(Belgium) Stef Van Campenhout	(Germany) Rinaldi Racing	28	33						0
	(Belgium) Bernard Delhez	(Switzerland) Kessel Racing	Ret	Ret	28					0
	(Belgium) Bernard Delhez	(France) Classic & Modern Racing				51	50	Ret	Ret	0
	(South Africa) David Perel	(Switzerland) Kessel Racing	Ret	Ret	28					0
	(South Africa) David Perel	(United Kingdom) Team Parker Racing				61	53	54		0
	(United States) Stephen Earle	(Switzerland) Kessel Racing	Ret	Ret	28					0
	(Italy) Stefano Comandini	(Italy) BMW Team Italia							28	0
	(Portugal) Francisco Guedes (United States) Peter Mann (Italy) Rino Mastronardi	(Italy) AF Corse	Ret	Ret	29	44	37	34	38	0
	(France) Nicolas Armindo (Germany) Jürgen Häring (France) Clément Mateu	(Germany) Attempto Racing	29	DNS	Ret	64	64	Ret	47	0
	(United Kingdom) Ben Barnicoat	(Belgium) Belgian Audi Club Team WRT							29	0
	(Italy) Giorgio Roda	(Italy) BMW Team Italia	Ret	30	30	62	63	Ret		0
	(United Kingdom) Duncan Tappy	(United Kingdom) Garage 59				31	31	40	30	0
	(Brazil) Pipo Derani (Brazil) Bruno Senna	(United Kingdom) Garage 59				31	31	40		0
	(Slovakia) Miroslav Konôpka (Poland) Andrzej Lewandowski (Poland) Teodor Myszkowski	(Slovakia) ARC Bratislava	34	38	31	49	47	39	DNS	0
	(United Kingdom) Chris Harris (United Kingdom) Derek Pierce	(United Kingdom) Team Parker Racing	Ret	40	32	61	53	54	34	0
	(Italy) Nicola Cadei	(Switzerland) Kessel Racing				43	36	32		0
	(United Kingdom) Chris Cooper	(United Kingdom) Team Parker Racing	Ret	40	32					0
	(Italy) Lorenzo Casè (Italy) Marco Magli (Italy) Cristian Passuti	(Italy) Antonelli Motorsport	32							0
	(United Kingdom) Bradley Ellis (United Kingdom) Euan Hankey (Turkey) Salih Yoluc	(Germany) Black Falcon							33	0
	(Italy) Matteo Cressoni	(Italy) AF Corse				44	37	34		0
	(Italy) Ferdinando Geri (Italy) Daniel Mancinelli (United States) Gregory Romanelli (Italy) Niccolò Schirò	(Italy) Easy Race				34	38	38		0
	(Italy) Francesco Castellacci (Italy) Marco Cioci (Switzerland) Thomas Flohr (Italy) Piergiuseppe Perazzini	(Austria) AT Racing				48	34	Ret		0
	(Australia) Roger Lago (Australia) Steve Owen (Australia) David Russell (Australia) Jonathon Webb	(Australia) Lago Racing				50	42	35		0
	(France) Romano Ricci	(France) CMR by Sport Garage		47	36					0
	(France) Theo Filler	(France) CMR by Sport Garage	Ret		36					0
	(France) Nicolas Melin	(France) CMR by Sport Garage			36					0
	(Mexico) Ricardo Sánchez	(United Kingdom) Nissan GT Academy Team RJN				39	49	37		0
	(Russia) Alexander Moiseev	(Italy) AF Corse	37		Ret					0
	(Russia) Alexander Moiseev	(Italy) Kaspersky Motorsport		41		40	48	Ret	48	0
	(Russia) Garry Kondakov	(Italy) AF Corse	37							0
	(Russia) Garry Kondakov	(Italy) Kaspersky Motorsport		41						0
	(United Kingdom) Andy Meyrick	(United Kingdom) Team Parker Racing				37	62	Ret		0
	(France) Nyls Stievenart	(France) CMR by Sport Garage	38	47						0
	(Germany) Jörg Viebahn	(France) CMR by Sport Garage	38							0
	(Germany) Dominik Schwager	(Germany) Black Pearl Racing			38					0
	(Belgium) Stéphane Lémeret	(Italy) AF Corse			Ret				39	0
	(Belgium) Stéphane Lémeret	(Italy) Kaspersky Motorsport				40	48	Ret		0
	(Slovakia) Zdeno Mikuláško	(Slovakia) ARC Bratislava				49	47	39		0
	(France) Gilles Lallemant	(France) Saintéloc Racing		39		53	56	51		0
	(Italy) Alberto Di Folco (Italy) Raffaele Giannoni	(Italy) Antonelli Motorsport			39					0
	(Italy) Thomas Kemenater (Germany) Claudio Sdanewitsch	(Italy) AF Corse							39	0
	(Portugal) Rui Águas	(Italy) Kaspersky Motorsport				40	48	Ret		0
	(Germany) Marc Basseng (Austria) Horst Felbermayr Jr. (Germany) Andreas Weishaupt	(Germany) Car Collection Motorsport							40	0
	(France) Mathieu Jaminet	(France) IMSA Performance							41	0
	(Italy) Diego Alessi (Denmark) Dennis Andersen (Denmark) Anders Fjordbach (Germany) Nicolas Pohler	(Austria) GRT Grasser Racing Team				60	54	42		0
	(Belgium) Frédéric Bouvy	(France) Saintéloc Racing				57	51	43		0
	(Italy) Stefano Gattuso	(Italy) Ombra Racing				63	60	45		0
	(Argentina) José Manuel Balbiani (Belgium) Angélique Detavernier (Belgium) Louis-Philippe Soenen	(Portugal) Sports & You							45	0
	(France) Adrien Tambay	(Belgium) Belgian Audi Club Team WRT							46	0
	(Finland) Markus Palttala	(Switzerland) Emil Frey Racing				55	57	49		0
	(France) Timothé Buret (France) Mickaël Petit	(France) Classic & Modern Racing				51	50	Ret		0
	(France) Michael Blanchemain (France) Jean-Paul Buffin (France) Valentin Hasse-Clot	(France) Saintéloc Racing				53	56	51		0
	(France) Sylvain Debs (France) David Loger (France) Eric Mouez	(France) Classic & Modern Racing				52	59	Ret		0
	(Sweden) Carl Rosenblad	(United Kingdom) Team Parker Racing				61	53	54		0
	(France) Arno Santamato	(Belgium) Boutsen Ginion				59	58	Ret		0
	(France) Kévin Estre	(Germany) Attempto Racing				64	64	Ret		0
	(Germany) Lucas Luhr	(Germany) Rowe Racing	Ret		Ret					
	(France) Benjamin Lariche (France) Dino Lunardi	(France) CMR by Sport Garage	Ret							
	(Germany) Klaus Graf	(Germany) Rowe Racing	Ret							
	(Germany) Christopher Brück	(Austria) Konrad Motorsport	Ret							
	(Canada) Jean-Frédéric Laberge (Canada) Alex Tagliani (Canada) Darryl O'Young	(Germany) Zakspeed	Ret							
	(Germany) Christian Hohenadel (Netherlands) Jules Szymkowiak	(Germany) AMG - Team HTP Motorsport			Ret					
	(Netherlands) Stéphane Kox	(Czech Republic) Scuderia Praha			Ret					
	(United States) Connor De Phillippi	(Belgium) Belgian Audi Club Team WRT							Ret	
Drivers ineligible to score points
	(France) Jean-Marc Bachelier (United States) Howard Blank (France) Yannick Mallegol (Monaco) Fabrice Notari	(Switzerland) RMS				56	52	47		
	(Belgium) Wim Meulders (Belgium) Grégory Paisse (Belgium) Pierre-Yves Paque (France) Philippe Richard	(Belgium) SpeedLover				58	55	48		
Pos.	Driver	Team	MNZ (Italy)	SIL (United Kingdom)	LEC (France)	6hrs	12hrs	24hrs	NÜR (Germany)	Points
Pos.	Driver	Team	MNZ (Italy)	SIL (United Kingdom)	LEC (France)	SPA (Belgium)			NÜR (Germany)	Points

Key
Colour	Result
Gold	Race winner
Silver	2nd place
Bronze	3rd place
Green	Points finish
Blue	Non-points finish
Blue	Non-classified finish (NC)
Purple	Did not finish (Ret)
Black	Disqualified (DSQ)
Black	Excluded (EX)
White	Did not start (DNS)
White	Race cancelled (C)
White	Withdrew (WD)
Blank	Did not participate

**Bold** – Pole
Italics – Fastest Lap

==== Pro-Am Cup ====
Pos.	Driver	Team	MNZ (Italy)	SIL (United Kingdom)	LEC (France)	SPA (Belgium)			NÜR (Germany)	Points
Pos.	Driver	Team	MNZ (Italy)	SIL (United Kingdom)	LEC (France)	6hrs	12hrs	24hrs	NÜR (Germany)	Points
1	(Italy) Alessandro Bonacini (Poland) Michał Broniszewski (Italy) Andrea Rizzoli	(Switzerland) Kessel Racing	5	29	7	23	18	22	14	102
2	(Switzerland) Philippe Giauque (France) Henry Hassid (France) Franck Perera	(Czech Republic) ISR	15	**19**	15	27	9	13	16	89
3	(United Kingdom) Oliver Morley (Spain) Miguel Toril	(Germany) Black Falcon	18	17	17	41	46	26	21	54
4	(United Kingdom) Jonathan Adam (Oman) Ahmad Al Harthy (United Kingdom) Devon Modell	(United Kingdom) Oman Racing Team	13	18	33	14	44	24	**26**	53
5	(Germany) Maro Engel	(Germany) Black Falcon	18	17	17				21	52
6	(United Kingdom) Phil Keen	(United Kingdom) Barwell Motorsport		Ret	12	25	28	17	24	47
7	(France) Laurent Cazenave (United Kingdom) Michael Lyons (Switzerland) Daniele Perfetti	(France) AKKA ASP	41	25	18	16	17	19	42	46
8	(United Kingdom) Duncan Cameron (Republic of Ireland) Matt Griffin	(Italy) AF Corse	Ret		8	20	30	46	17	43
9	(Germany) Alexander Mattschull (Germany) Steve Parrow	(Germany) Black Pearl Racing	11	36	38				5	40
10	(Germany) Daniel Keilwitz	(Germany) Black Pearl Racing	11	36					5	40
11	(France) Thierry Cornac (France) Raymond Narac	(France) IMSA Performance	25	42	23	29	21	10	41	35
12	(France) Maxime Jousse	(France) IMSA Performance	25	42	23	29	21	10		35
13	(France) Nicolas Lapierre	(Czech Republic) ISR				27	9	13		33
14	(France) Patrick Pilet	(France) IMSA Performance				29	21	10		32
15	(Russia) Leo Machitski (Italy) Marco Mapelli	(United Kingdom) Barwell Motorsport	42	Ret	12	36	32	25	24	29
16	(Netherlands) Max van Splunteren	(Germany) Attempto Racing	23	44	16	15	26	52	49	29
17	(Netherlands) Jeroen Mul	(Germany) Attempto Racing	23	44	16	15	26	52	WD	29
18	(France) Morgan Moullin-Traffort	(France) AKKA ASP				16	17	19		28
19	(Italy) Davide Rizzo	(Italy) AF Corse			8					24
20	(United Kingdom) Joe Osborne	(United Kingdom) Barwell Motorsport	24	32		25	28	17		24
21	(Italy) Matteo Beretta (Italy) Giovanni Berton	(Italy) Ombra Racing	22	26	41	63	60	45	23	24
22	(United Kingdom) Oliver Gavin (United Kingdom) Jon Minshaw	(United Kingdom) Barwell Motorsport				25	28	17		22
23	(Italy) Giacomo Piccini	(Switzerland) Kessel Racing				23	18	22		22
24	(Italy) Lorenzo Bontempelli (Japan) Motoaki Ishikawa	(Italy) AF Corse	**10**	34	**25**	65	65	Ret	37	21
25	(Italy) Giancarlo Fisichella	(Italy) AF Corse	**10**	34		65	65	Ret		19
26	(United Kingdom) Darren Turner	(United Kingdom) Oman Racing Team				14	44	24		18
27	(Belgium) Louis Machiels	(Germany) Attempto Racing	23	44		15	26	52	49	17
28	(Italy) Stefano Costantini	(Italy) Ombra Racing	22	26	41	63	60	45		16
29	(Italy) Matteo Malucelli (Czech Republic) Jiří Písařík	(Czech Republic) Scuderia Praha	Ret	31	Ret	35	25	23		14
30	(Italy) Giovanni Venturini	(Germany) Attempto Racing				15	26	52		13
31	(Italy) David Fumanelli (Czech Republic) Josef Král	(Czech Republic) Scuderia Praha				35	25	23		13
32	(Netherlands) Paul van Splunteren	(Germany) Attempto Racing			16					12
33	(United Kingdom) Ian Loggie (United Kingdom) Callum MacLeod (United Kingdom) Tom Onslow-Cole	(United Kingdom) Team Parker Racing	35	27	Ret	**37**	62	Ret		9
34	(Italy) Alex Frassineti	(Italy) Ombra Racing							23	8
35	(Italy) Riccardo Ragazzi (United Kingdom) Andrew Scott	(Italy) AF Corse				20	30	46		7
36	(France) Romain Sarazin (Australia) Matt Simmons (United Kingdom) Sean Walkinshaw	(United Kingdom) Nissan GT Academy Team RJN	30	28	37	39	49	37	31	6
37	(France) Jules Gounon (Austria) Christopher Zöchling	(Austria) Konrad Motorsport				28	29	30	27	6
38	(France) Julien Darras (Luxembourg) Olivier Grotz (Saudi Arabia) Karim Ojjeh	(Belgium) Boutsen Ginion	39	35	20	59	58	Ret	35	4
39	(United Kingdom) Marco Attard	(United Kingdom) Barwell Motorsport	42			36	32	25		4
40	(United Kingdom) Tom Kimber-Smith	(United Kingdom) Barwell Motorsport				36	32	25		4
41	(Netherlands) Rik Breukers (Austria) Luca Rettenbacher	(Austria) Konrad Motorsport				28	29	30		4
42	(Italy) Stefano Colombo (Netherlands) Max Koebolt	(Italy) BMW Team Italia	Ret	30	30	62	63	Ret	28	3
43	(Italy) Giorgio Roda	(Italy) BMW Team Italia	Ret	30	30	62	63	Ret		2
44	(United Kingdom) Richard Abra (United Kingdom) Mark Poole	(United Kingdom) Barwell Motorsport	24	32						2
45	(Monaco) Olivier Beretta	(Italy) AF Corse			**25**	65	65	Ret	37	2
46	(Saudi Arabia) Abdulaziz Bin Turki Al Faisal (Spain) Daniel Juncadella	(Germany) Black Falcon				41	46	26		2
47	(Germany) Hendrik Still	(Austria) Konrad Motorsport							27	2
48	(Italy) Michela Cerruti	(Italy) Antonelli Motorsport			39	33	41	28		1
49	(Monaco) Cédric Sbirrazzuoli (Italy) Loris Spinelli (France) Gilles Vannelet	(Italy) Antonelli Motorsport				33	41	28		1
50	(Italy) Stefano Comandini	(Italy) BMW Team Italia							28	1
51	(United Kingdom) Andy Meyrick	(United Kingdom) Team Parker Racing				**37**	62	Ret		1
	(Italy) Marco Bonanomi (France) Marc Rostan	(France) Saintéloc Racing	Ret	39	26	57	51	43	44	0
	(Belgium) Christian Kelders	(France) Saintéloc Racing	Ret		26	57	51	43	44	0
	(France) Nicolas Armindo (Germany) Jürgen Häring (France) Clément Mateu	(Germany) Attempto Racing	29	DNS	Ret	64	64	Ret	47	0
	(Italy) Lorenzo Casè (Italy) Marco Magli (Italy) Cristian Passuti	(Italy) Antonelli Motorsport	32							0
	(United Kingdom) Bradley Ellis (United Kingdom) Euan Hankey (Turkey) Salih Yoluc	(Germany) Black Falcon							33	0
	(Italy) Ferdinando Geri (Italy) Daniel Mancinelli (United States) Gregory Romanelli (Italy) Niccolò Schirò	(Italy) Easy Race				34	38	38		0
	(Italy) Francesco Castellacci (Italy) Marco Cioci (Switzerland) Thomas Flohr (Italy) Piergiuseppe Perazzini	(Austria) AT Racing				48	34	Ret		0
	(Australia) Roger Lago (Australia) Steve Owen (Australia) David Russell (Australia) Jonathon Webb	(Australia) Lago Racing				50	42	35		0
	(Mexico) Ricardo Sánchez	(United Kingdom) Nissan GT Academy Team RJN				39	49	37		0
	(Germany) Dominik Schwager	(Germany) Black Pearl Racing			38					0
	(France) Gilles Lallemant	(France) Saintéloc Racing		39						0
	(Italy) Alberto Di Folco (Italy) Raffaele Giannoni	(Italy) Antonelli Motorsport			39					0
	(Germany) Marc Basseng (Austria) Horst Felbermayr Jr. (Germany) Andreas Weishaupt	(Germany) Car Collection Motorsport							40	0
	(France) Mathieu Jaminet	(France) IMSA Performance							41	0
	(Italy) Diego Alessi (Denmark) Dennis Andersen (Denmark) Anders Fjordbach (Germany) Nicolas Pohler	(Austria) GRT Grasser Racing Team				60	54	42		0
	(Belgium) Frédéric Bouvy	(France) Saintéloc Racing				57	51	43		0
	(Italy) Stefano Gattuso	(Italy) Ombra Racing				63	60	45		0
	(France) Arno Santamato	(Belgium) Boutsen Ginion				59	58	Ret		0
	(Germany) Martin Tomczyk	(Italy) BMW Team Italia				62	63	Ret		0
	(France) Kévin Estre	(Germany) Attempto Racing				64	64	Ret		0
	(France) Theo Filler (France) Benjamin Lariche (France) Dino Lunardi	(France) CMR by Sport Garage	Ret							
	(Netherlands) Stéphane Kox	(Czech Republic) Scuderia Praha			Ret					
Pos.	Driver	Team	MNZ (Italy)	SIL (United Kingdom)	LEC (France)	6hrs	12hrs	24hrs	NÜR (Germany)	Points
Pos.	Driver	Team	MNZ (Italy)	SIL (United Kingdom)	LEC (France)	SPA (Belgium)			NÜR (Germany)	Points

==== Am Cup ====
Pos.	Driver	Team	MNZ (Italy)	SIL (United Kingdom)	LEC (France)	SPA (Belgium)			NÜR (Germany)	Points
Pos.	Driver	Team	MNZ (Italy)	SIL (United Kingdom)	LEC (France)	6hrs	12hrs	24hrs	NÜR (Germany)	Points
1	(Russia) Vadim Gitlin (Australia) Liam Talbot (Italy) Marco Zanuttini	(Switzerland) Kessel Racing	Ret	45	22	**43**	36	32	43	96
2	(France) Jean-Luc Beaubelique (France) Maurice Ricci (France) Gilles Vannelet	(France) AKKA ASP	27	37	24				19	92
3	(Germany) Pierre Ehret	(Germany) Rinaldi Racing	28	33	Ret	54	45	36	36	82
4	(Slovakia) Miroslav Konôpka (Poland) Andrzej Lewandowski (Poland) Teodor Myszkowski	(Slovakia) ARC Bratislava	34	38	31	49	47	39	DNS	63
5	(Portugal) Francisco Guedes (United States) Peter Mann (Italy) Rino Mastronardi	(Italy) AF Corse	**Ret**	Ret	29	44	37	34	**38**	60
6	(United Kingdom) Chris Harris (United Kingdom) Derek Pierce	(United Kingdom) Team Parker Racing	Ret	40	32	61	53	54	34	48
7	(Italy) Nicola Cadei	(Switzerland) Kessel Racing				**43**	36	32		47
8	(Belgium) Stef Van Campenhout	(Germany) Rinaldi Racing	28	33						43
9	(Russia) Alexander Moiseev	(Italy) AF Corse	37		Ret					43
9	(Russia) Alexander Moiseev	(Italy) Kaspersky Motorsport		41		40	48	Ret	48	43
10	(France) Thomas Nicolle	(France) CMR by Sport Garage	38	47	27					40
10	(France) Thomas Nicolle	(France) Classic & Modern Racing				52	59	Ret		40
11	(Russia) Rinat Salikhov	(Germany) Rinaldi Racing			Ret	54	45	36	36	39
12	(Italy) Matteo Cressoni	(Italy) AF Corse				44	37	34		34
13	(South Africa) David Perel	(Switzerland) Kessel Racing	Ret	**Ret**	**28**					29
13	(South Africa) David Perel	(United Kingdom) Team Parker Racing				61	53	54		29
14	(France) Romain Brandela	(France) CMR by Sport Garage			27					28
14	(France) Romain Brandela	(France) Classic & Modern Racing				51	50	Ret	Ret	28
15	(Belgium) Stéphane Lémeret	(Italy) AF Corse			Ret				39	27
15	(Belgium) Stéphane Lémeret	(Italy) Kaspersky Motorsport				40	48	Ret		27
16	(Belgium) Bernard Delhez	(Switzerland) Kessel Racing	Ret	**Ret**	**28**					26
16	(Belgium) Bernard Delhez	(France) Classic & Modern Racing				51	50	Ret	Ret	26
17	(Germany) Alexander Mattschull (Germany) Marco Seefried	(Germany) Rinaldi Racing				54	45	36		24
18	(Slovakia) Zdeno Mikuláško	(Slovakia) ARC Bratislava				49	47	39		24
19	(Russia) Garry Kondakov (Italy) Riccardo Ragazzi	(Italy) AF Corse	37							22
19	(Russia) Garry Kondakov (Italy) Riccardo Ragazzi	(Italy) Kaspersky Motorsport		41						22
20	(Italy) Davide Rizzo	(Italy) Kaspersky Motorsport				40	48	Ret	48	21
21	(France) Christophe Hamon	(France) CMR by Sport Garage			27					19
21	(France) Christophe Hamon	(France) Classic & Modern Racing							Ret	19
22	(United Kingdom) Chris Cooper	(United Kingdom) Team Parker Racing	Ret	40	32					18
23	(Portugal) Rui Águas	(Italy) Kaspersky Motorsport				40	48	Ret		17
24	(United States) Stephen Earle	(Switzerland) Kessel Racing	Ret	**Ret**	**28**					17
25	(France) Nyls Stievenart	(France) CMR by Sport Garage	38	47						16
26	(France) Michael Blanchemain (France) Jean-Paul Buffin (France) Valentin Hasse-Clot (France) Gilles Lallemant	(France) Saintéloc Racing				53	56	51		15
27	(Sweden) Carl Rosenblad	(United Kingdom) Team Parker Racing				61	53	54		12
28	(Germany) Jörg Viebahn	(France) CMR by Sport Garage	38							10
29	(Italy) Thomas Kemenater (Germany) Claudio Sdanewitsch	(Italy) AF Corse							39	10
30	(France) Romano Ricci	(France) CMR by Sport Garage		47	36					10
31	(France) Timothé Buret (France) Mickaël Petit	(France) Classic & Modern Racing				51	50	Ret		9
32	(Argentina) José Manuel Balbiani (Belgium) Angélique Detavernier (Belgium) Louis-Philippe Soenen	(Portugal) Sports & You							45	6
33	(France) Sylvain Debs (France) David Loger (France) Eric Mouez	(France) Classic & Modern Racing				52	59	Ret		5
34	(France) Theo Filler (France) Nicolas Melin	(France) CMR by Sport Garage			36					4
Pos.	Driver	Team	MNZ (Italy)	SIL (United Kingdom)	LEC (France)	6hrs	12hrs	24hrs	NÜR (Germany)	Points
Pos.	Driver	Team	MNZ (Italy)	SIL (United Kingdom)	LEC (France)	SPA (Belgium)			NÜR (Germany)	Points

=== Teams' championships ===
==== Overall ====
Pos.	Team	Manufacturer	MNZ (Italy)	SIL (United Kingdom)	LEC (France)	SPA (Belgium)			NÜR (Germany)	Points
Pos.	Team	Manufacturer	MNZ (Italy)	SIL (United Kingdom)	LEC (France)	6hrs	12hrs	24hrs	NÜR (Germany)	Points
1	(United Kingdom) Garage 59	McLaren	1	6	1	8	31	31	30	71
2	(Belgium) Belgian Audi Club/Audi Sport Team WRT	Audi	6	2	9	**3**	11	3	2	71
3	(United Kingdom) Bentley Team M-Sport	Bentley	3	8	4	5	1	4	9	71
4	(Germany) (AMG - Team) HTP Motorsport	Mercedes-Benz	**2**	1	43	13	7	5	4	70
5	(Germany) Rowe Racing	BMW	Ret	4	Ret	1	4	1	10	60
6	(Austria) GRT Grasser Racing Team	Lamborghini	8	**3**	40	4	6	11	**1**	58
7	(United Kingdom) Nissan GT Academy Team RJN	Nissan	4	28	5	38	33	37	3	39
8	(Switzerland) Spirit of Race	Ferrari	Ret	14	**2**	32	10	16	32	29
9	(Belgium) Team WRT	Audi	16	20	3	6	15	8	29	29
10	(France) Saintéloc Racing	Audi	12	7	6	11	13	7	12	28
11	(France) (AMG - Team) AKKA ASP	Mercedes-Benz	27	25	18	16	12	2	19	19
12	(Germany) Audi Sport Team Phoenix	Audi				2	2	50		18
13	(Switzerland) Kessel Racing	Ferrari	5	29	7	23	18	22	14	16
14	(Czech Republic) ISR	Audi	15	15	11	24	5	9	11	12
15	(Germany) Rinaldi Racing/Black Pearl Racing	Ferrari	11	33	38	54	45	36	5	11
16	(Switzerland) Emil Frey Racing	Jaguar	20	43	42	17	22	49	7	8
17	(Germany) AMG - Team Black Falcon	Mercedes-Benz	7		35	45	27	20		6
18	(Italy) AF Corse/Kaspersky Motorsport (Austria) AT Racing	Ferrari	10	16	8	20	30	46	17	6
19	(Germany) Attempto Racing	Lamborghini/Porsche	19	10	10	15	23	14	22	5
20	(Germany) Black Falcon	Mercedes-Benz	18	11	17	12	14	26	18	3
21	(France) IMSA Performance	Porsche	25	42	23	29	21	10	41	2
	(United Kingdom) Barwell Motorsport	Lamborghini	24	32	12	25	28	17	24	0
	(United Kingdom) Oman Racing Team	Aston Martin	13	18	33	14	44	24	26	0
	(Germany) Zakspeed	Mercedes-Benz	Ret						13	0
	(Belgium) Boutsen Ginion	BMW	39	35	20	59	58	Ret	35	0
	(Germany) SPS Automotive Performance	Mercedes-Benz			21					0
	(Italy) Ombra Racing	Lamborghini	22	26	41	63	60	45	23	0
	(Czech Republic) Scuderia Praha	Ferrari	Ret	31	Ret	35	25	23		0
	(Austria) Konrad Motorsport	Lamborghini	Ret	24		28	29	30	27	0
	(United Kingdom) Team Parker Racing	Bentley	35	27	32	37	53	54	34	0
	(France) Classic & Modern Racing	Ferrari			27	51	50	Ret	Ret	0
	(Italy) BMW Team Italia	BMW	Ret	30	30	62	63	Ret	28	0
	(Italy) Antonelli Motorsport	Lamborghini	32		39	33	41	28		0
	(Slovakia) ARC Bratislava	Lamborghini	34	38	31	49	47	39	DNS	0
	(Italy) Easy Race	Ferrari				34	38	38		0
	(Australia) Lago Racing	Lamborghini				50	42	35		0
	(France) CMR by Sport Garage	Ferrari	38	47						0
	(Germany) Car Collection Motorsport	Audi							40	0
	(Portugal) Sports & You	Mercedes-Benz							45	0
Teams ineligible to score points
	(Switzerland) RMS	Porsche				56	52	47		
	(Belgium) SpeedLover	Porsche				58	55	48		
Pos.	Driver	Team	MNZ (Italy)	SIL (United Kingdom)	LEC (France)	6hrs	12hrs	24hrs	NÜR (Germany)	Points
Pos.	Driver	Team	MNZ (Italy)	SIL (United Kingdom)	LEC (France)	SPA (Belgium)			NÜR (Germany)	Points

==== Pro-Am Cup ====
Pos.	Team	Manufacturer	MNZ (Italy)	SIL (United Kingdom)	LEC (France)	SPA (Belgium)			NÜR (Germany)	Points
Pos.	Team	Manufacturer	MNZ (Italy)	SIL (United Kingdom)	LEC (France)	6hrs	12hrs	24hrs	NÜR (Germany)	Points
1	(Switzerland) Kessel Racing	Ferrari	5	29	7	23	18	22	14	102
2	(Czech Republic) ISR	Audi	15	**19**	15	27	9	13	16	89
3	(Italy) AF Corse (Austria) AT Racing	Ferrari	**10**	34	**8**	20	30	46	17	63
4	(Germany) Black Falcon	Mercedes-Benz	18	17	17	41	46	26	21	56
5	(United Kingdom) Oman Racing Team	Aston Martin	13	18	33	14	44	24	**26**	53
6	(United Kingdom) Barwell Motorsport	Lamborghini	24	32	12	25	28	17	24	49
7	(France) AKKA ASP	Mercedes-Benz	41	25	18	16	17	19	42	46
8	(Germany) Black Pearl Racing	Ferrari	11	36	38				5	40
9	(France) IMSA Performance	Porsche	25	42	23	29	21	10	41	35
10	(Germany) Attempto Racing	Lamborghini/Porsche	23	44	16	15	26	52	47	29
11	(Italy) Ombra Racing	Lamborghini	22	26	41	63	60	45	23	24
12	(Czech Republic) Scuderia Praha	Ferrari	Ret	31	Ret	35	25	23		14
13	(United Kingdom) Team Parker Racing	Bentley	35	27	Ret	**37**	62	Ret		9
14	(Austria) Konrad Motorsport	Lamborghini				28	29	30	27	7
15	(United Kingdom) Nissan GT Academy Team RJN	Nissan	30	28	37	39	49	37	31	6
16	(Belgium) Boutsen Ginion	BMW	39	35	20	59	58	Ret	35	4
17	(Italy) BMW Team Italia	BMW	Ret	30	30	62	63	Ret	28	3
18	(Italy) Antonelli Motorsport	Lamborghini	32		39	33	41	28		2
19	(France) Saintéloc Racing	Audi	Ret	39	26	57	51	43	44	1
	(Italy) Easy Race	Ferrari				34	38	38		0
	(Australia) Lago Racing	Lamborghini				50	42	35		0
	(Germany) Car Collection Motorsport	Audi							40	0
	(Austria) GRT Grasser Racing Team	Lamborghini				60	54	42		0
	(France) CMR by Sport Garage	Ferrari	Ret							
Pos.	Driver	Team	MNZ (Italy)	SIL (United Kingdom)	LEC (France)	6hrs	12hrs	24hrs	NÜR (Germany)	Points
Pos.	Driver	Team	MNZ (Italy)	SIL (United Kingdom)	LEC (France)	SPA (Belgium)			NÜR (Germany)	Points

==== Am Cup ====
Pos.	Team	Manufacturer	MNZ (Italy)	SIL (United Kingdom)	LEC (France)	SPA (Belgium)			NÜR (Germany)	Points
Pos.	Team	Manufacturer	MNZ (Italy)	SIL (United Kingdom)	LEC (France)	6hrs	12hrs	24hrs	NÜR (Germany)	Points
1	(Switzerland) Kessel Racing	Ferrari	Ret	**45**	**22**	**43**	36	32	43	98
2	(France) AKKA ASP	Mercedes-Benz	27	37	24				19	92
3	(Germany) Rinaldi Racing	Ferrari	28	33	Ret	54	45	36	36	84
4	(Slovakia) ARC Bratislava	Lamborghini	34	38	31	49	47	39	DNS	67
5	(Switzerland) Spirit of Race	Ferrari	**Ret**	Ret	29	40	37	34	39	65
6	(United Kingdom) Team Parker Racing	Bentley	Ret	40	32	61	53	54	34	54
7	(Italy) AF Corse/Kaspersky Motorsport	Ferrari	37	41	Ret				**38**	35
8	(France) Classic & Modern Racing	Ferrari			27	51	50	Ret	Ret	30
9	(France) Saintéloc Racing	Audi				53	56	51		18
10	(France) CMR by Sport Garage	Ferrari	38	47						16
11	(Portugal) Sports & You	Mercedes-Benz							45	6
Pos.	Driver	Team	MNZ (Italy)	SIL (United Kingdom)	LEC (France)	6hrs	12hrs	24hrs	NÜR (Germany)	Points
Pos.	Driver	Team	MNZ (Italy)	SIL (United Kingdom)	LEC (France)	SPA (Belgium)			NÜR (Germany)	Points

== See also ==
- 2016 Blancpain GT Series
- 2016 Blancpain GT Series Sprint Cup
