= Ligier JS49 =

Sports prototype car

- Category: CN
- Constructor: Ligier

Technical specifications
- Chassis: Aluminum monocoque covered in glass fiber composite-nomex body
- Suspension (front): Double wishbones, pushrod with mono-shock absorber system, and torsion-bar springs, anti-roll bar
- Suspension (rear): Double wishbones, pushrod with mono-shock absorber system and coils springs, anti-roll bar
- Length: 4,265 mm (168 in)
- Width: 1,800 mm (71 in) including tyres
- Axle track: 1,510 mm (59.4 in) (front); 1,470 mm (57.9 in) (rear)
- Engine: Honda K20A 2.0 L (122 cu in) DOHC inline-4 engine naturally-aspirated, longitudinally mounted in a mid-engined, rear-wheel drive layout
- Transmission: SADEV 6-speed sequential gearbox
- Power: 240 PS (177 kW)
- Weight: 535–540 kg (1,179–1,190 lb)
- Fuel: Various unleaded control fuel
- Lubricants: Various
- Brakes: Brembo ventilated carbon brake discs, 6-piston calipers and pads
- Tyres: Various

Competition history
- Debut: 2004

The Ligier JS49 is a sports prototype race car, designed, developed and built by Ligier since 2004. It conforms to FIA Group CN regulations to compete in sports car racing. It uses a 2-litre Honda K-series engine.
