= 2010 Superstars GTSprint Series =

2010 International GTSprint Series

Seasons
- ← none 2011 →

The 2010 Superstars GTSprint Series season was the first year of the International GTSprint Series. The season began at Monza on 28 March and finished at Vallelunga on 10 October. Alessandro Bonetti and Maurizio Mediani won the championship, driving a Ferrari.

== Teams and drivers ==
Team	Car	No.	Drivers	Class	Rounds
(Italy) Vittoria Competizioni	Ferrari F430	21	(Italy) Alessandro Bonetti	GT2	All
(Italy) Vittoria Competizioni	Ferrari F430	21	(Italy) Maurizio Mediani	GT2	All
(Italy) Vittoria Competizioni	Ferrari F430	60	(Italy) Alessandra Neri	GTCup	All
(Italy) Vittoria Competizioni	Ferrari F430	60	(Italy) Marco Mapelli	GTCup	5-6
(Italy) Vittoria Competizioni	Ferrari F430	79	(Italy) Fabrizio Fede	GTCup	6
(Italy) Vittoria Competizioni	Ferrari F430	79	(Italy) Andrea Palma	GTCup	6
(Italy) AF Corse	Ferrari F430	22	(Italy) Nicola Cadei	GT2	All
(Italy) AF Corse	Ferrari F430	22	(Monaco) Cédric Sbirrazzuoli	GT2	1-5
(Italy) AF Corse	Ferrari F430	26	(Italy) Marco Cioci	GT2	2
(Italy) AF Corse	Ferrari F430	26	(Italy) Piergiuseppe Perazzini	GT2	2
(Italy) AF Corse	Ferrari F430	26	(United States) Robert Kauffman	GT2	6
(Italy) AF Corse	Ferrari F430	29	(Italy) Marco Cassera	GT2	6
(Italy) AF Corse	Ferrari F430	29	(Italy) Stefano Pozzi	GT2	6
(Italy) AF Corse	Maserati GT	40	(Italy) Gabriele Marotta	GT4	1-5
(Italy) Racing Team Edil Cris	Ferrari F430	23	(Italy) Glauco Solieri	GT2	All
(Italy) Easy Race	Ferrari F430	24	(Italy) Michele Rugolo	GT2	1-3
(Italy) Easy Race	Ferrari F430	24	(Italy) Michele Faccin	GT2	2
(Italy) AB Motorsport	Porsche 996	25	(Italy) Antonio de Castro	GT2	1-2
(Italy) AB Motorsport	Porsche 996	91	(Italy) Antonio de Castro	GTS	4
(Italy) AB Motorsport	Porsche 996	25	(Italy) Bruno Barbaro	GT2	1
(Italy) AB Motorsport	Porsche 996	25	(Italy) Sabino de Castro	GT2	2
(Italy) AB Motorsport	Porsche 996	91	(Italy) Sabino de Castro	GTS	4
(Portugal) Aurora Racing Team	Ferrari F430	27	(Portugal) Francisco Cruz	GT2	3
(United States) Seminole Racing Team	Porsche 997	28	(Switzerland) Daniele Perfetti	GT2	5
(Italy) FR Competition	Ferrari F430	30	(Italy) Gabriele Sabatini	GT3	1-4, 6
(Italy) Scuderia 22	Corvette C6R	32	(Italy) Diego Alessi	GT3	1-2
(Italy) Scuderia 22	Corvette C6R	32	(Italy) Carlo Graziani	GT3	1-4
(Italy) Scuderia 22	Corvette C6R	32	(Italy) Marco Cioci	GT3	3
(Italy) Scuderia 22	Corvette C6R	32	(Italy) Fabrizio Armetta	GT3	4
(Italy) GDL Racing	Porsche 997	34	(Italy) Dario Paletto	GT3	2
(Italy) GDL Racing	Porsche 997	34	(Italy) Giorgio Piodi	GT3	2
(Italy) GDL Racing	Porsche 997	72	(Italy) Riccardo Bianco	GTCup	2
(Italy) GDL Racing	Porsche 997	72	(Italy) Sergio Parato	GTCup	2
(Italy) GDL Racing	Porsche 997	72	(Italy) Guido Formilli Fendi	GTCup	6
(Italy) Mik Corse	Lamborghini Gallardo	36	(Italy) Carlo Graziani	GT3	5-6
(Italy) Mik Corse	Lamborghini Gallardo	37	(Italy) Ferdinando Geri	GT3	5
(Italy) Mik Corse	Lamborghini Gallardo	37	(Italy) Ivano Costa	GT3	6
(Italy) Star Cars	Porsche Cayman	41	(Italy) Gianluca Pizzuti	GTS	1
(Italy) Star Cars	Porsche Cayman	41	(Italy) Gianluca Pizzuti	GT4	2
(Italy) Star Cars	Porsche 997	77	(Italy) Andrea Gagliardini	GTCup	2
(Italy) PB Racing	Lotus Exige	42	(Italy) Stefano d'Aste	GT4	1
(Italy) Lanza Motorsport	Nissan 350Z	45	(Italy) Paolo Meroni	GT4	1
(Italy) Lanza Motorsport	Nissan 350Z	45	(Italy) Mauro Simoncini	GT4	1
(Switzerland) Swiss Team	Maserati GT	46	(Switzerland) Fabio Venier	GT4	1-4
(Italy) Scuderia Giudici	Lotus 2-Eleven	47	(Italy) Gianni Giudici	GT4-S	1-4
(Italy) Scuderia Giudici	Porsche 997	71	(Italy) Marco Fumagalli	GTCup	1-4
(Italy) Scuderia Giudici	Porsche 997	75	(Italy) Andrea Perlini	GTCup	1-4
(Italy) Scuderia Giudici	Dodge Viper GTS-R	90	(Italy) Maurizio Ardigò	GTS	2-3, 6
(Italy) Happy Racer	Ginetta G50	50	(Italy) Sergio Orsero	GT4	6
(Italy) Happy Racer	Ginetta G50	50	(Italy) Giampaolo Tenchini	GT4	6
(Italy) Scuderia La.Na.	Ferrari F430	62	(Italy) Thomas Kemenater	GTCup	All
(Italy) Scuderia La.Na.	Ferrari F430	62	(Italy) Matteo Manzo	GTCup	1-4
(Italy) Scuderia La.Na.	Ferrari F430	62	(Italy) Mauro Trentin	GTCup	5
(Italy) Scuderia La.Na.	Ferrari F430	63	(Italy) Giovanni Bassetti	GTCup	1-2
(Italy) Scuderia La.Na.	Ferrari F430	64	(Italy) Gianni Checcoli	GTCup	1-4
(Italy) Scuderia La.Na.	Ferrari F430	64	(Italy) Michele Merendino	GTCup	2
(Italy) Scuderia La.Na.	Ferrari F430	64	(Italy) Giovanni Bassetti	GTCup	3
(Italy) Scuderia La.Na.	Ferrari F430	64	(Italy) Davide Amaduzzi	GTCup	6
(Italy) Scuderia La.Na.	Ferrari F430	64	(Italy) Mauro Trentin	GTCup	6
(Italy) Scuderia La.Na.	Ferrari F430	65	(Italy) Mario Benusiglio	GTCup	1
(Italy) Scuderia La.Na.	Ferrari F430	65	(Italy) Davide Amaduzzi	GTCup	1-2
(Italy) Scuderia La.Na.	Ferrari F430	65	(Italy) Massimiliano Colombo	GTCup	2
(Italy) Romeo Ferraris	Ferrari F430	66	(Italy) Andrea Dromedari	GTCup	All
(Italy) Romeo Ferraris	Porsche 997	68	(Italy) Mario Ferraris	GTCup	5-6
(Italy) Fortuna Racing	Porsche 997	70	(Italy) Sébastien Fortuna	GTCup	1-2
(Italy) Antonelli Motorsport	Porsche 997	76	(Italy) Omar Galbiati	GTCup	1
(Italy) ZRS Motorsport	Porsche 997	78	(Italy) Stefano Maestri	GTCup	6
(Italy) M Racing	Porsche 997	81	(Italy) Emanuele Romani	GTCup	6
(Italy) Red Zone	Porsche 997	92	(Italy) Emanuele Rossi	GTS	6

== Calendar and results ==
Round		Circuit	Date	Pole position	Fastest lap	Winning driver	Winning team
1	R1	(Italy) Autodromo Nazionale Monza, Monza	28 March	(Italy) Nicola Cadei	(Italy) Nicola Cadei	(Italy) Nicola Cadei	(Italy) AF Corse
1	R2	(Italy) Autodromo Nazionale Monza, Monza	28 March		(Italy) Alessandro Bonetti	(Italy) Alessandro Bonetti	(Italy) Vittoria Competizioni
2	R1	(Italy) Autodromo Enzo e Dino Ferrari, Imola	18 April	(Italy) Piergiuseppe Perazzini	(Italy) Nicola Cadei	(Italy) Alessandro Bonetti	(Italy) Vittoria Competizioni
2	R2	(Italy) Autodromo Enzo e Dino Ferrari, Imola	18 April		(Italy) Maurizio Mediani	(Italy) Marco Cioci	(Italy) AF Corse
3	R1	(Portugal) Autódromo Internacional do Algarve, Portimão	23 May	(Portugal) Francisco Cruz	(Italy) Alessandro Bonetti	(Italy) Nicola Cadei	(Italy) AF Corse
3	R2	(Portugal) Autódromo Internacional do Algarve, Portimão	23 May		(Italy) Maurizio Mediani	(Italy) Michele Rugolo	(Italy) Easy Race
4	R1	(Germany) Hockenheimring, Hockenheim	13 June	(Italy) Nicola Cadei	(Italy) Nicola Cadei	(Italy) Nicola Cadei	(Italy) AF Corse
4	R2	(Germany) Hockenheimring, Hockenheim	13 June		(Monaco) Cédric Sbirrazzuoli	(Italy) Alessandro Bonetti	(Italy) Vittoria Competizioni
5	R1	(France) Circuit Paul Ricard, Le Castellet	19 September	(Monaco) Cédric Sbirrazzuoli	(Monaco) Cédric Sbirrazzuoli	(Italy) Maurizio Mediani	(Italy) Vittoria Competizioni
5	R2	(France) Circuit Paul Ricard, Le Castellet	19 September		(Italy) Nicola Cadei	(Italy) Nicola Cadei	(Italy) AF Corse
6	R1	(Italy) ACI Vallelunga Circuit, Campagnano	10 October	(Italy) Maurizio Mediani	(Italy) Maurizio Mediani	(Italy) Maurizio Mediani	(Italy) Vittoria Competizioni
6	R2	(Italy) ACI Vallelunga Circuit, Campagnano	10 October		(Italy) Nicola Cadei	(Italy) Nicola Cadei	(Italy) AF Corse

== Championship Standings ==
=== Drivers' Championship ===
Pos	Driver	MON (Italy)		IMO (Italy)		ALG (Portugal)		HOC (Germany)		CPR (France)		VAL (Italy)		Pts
1	(Italy) Alessandro Bonetti	2	1	1	2	2	4	2	1	1	3	**1**	2	204
1	(Italy) Maurizio Mediani	2	1	1	2	2	4	2	1	1	3	**1**	2	204
2	(Italy) Nicola Cadei	**1**	3	2	3	1	3	**1**	3	**2**	1	2	1	202
3	(Monaco) Cédric Sbirrazzuoli	**1**	3	2	3	1	3	**1**	3	**2**	1			166
4	(Italy) Glauco Solieri	4	4	3	4	6	5	4	2	3	4	7	3	119
5	(Italy) Michele Rugolo	3	2	Ret	5	3	1							67
6	(Italy) Carlo Graziani	Ret	DNS	10	Ret	5	6	3	4	8	**9**	8	**6**	51
7	(Italy) Thomas Kemenater	5	6	8	**10**	9	8	6	12	6	8	5	7	50
8	(Italy) Alessandra Neri	6	18†	7	9	7	7	7	6	Ret	7	3	11	46
9	(Italy) Marco Cioci			**5**	1	5	6							43
10	(Italy) Andrea Dromedari	Ret	8	11	Ret	8	**9**	5	5	5	5	Ret	10	41
11	(Italy) Piergiuseppe Perazzini			**5**	1									29
12	(Italy) Matteo Manzo	5	6	8	**10**	9	8	6	12					29
13	(Portugal) Francisco Cruz					**4**	2							26
14	(Switzerland) Daniele Perfetti									4	2			25
15	(Italy) Davide Amaduzzi	9	5	13	7							6	8	23
16	(Italy) Fabrizio Armetta							3	4					22
17	(United States) Robert Kauffman											4	5	18
18	(Italy) Mauro Trentin									6	8	6	8	18
19	(Italy) Marco Mapelli									Ret	7	3	11	16
20	(Italy) Dario Paletto			4	6									16
20	(Italy) Giorgio Piodi			4	6									16
21	(Italy) Marco Cassera											9	4	12
21	(Italy) Stefano Pozzi											9	4	12
22	(Italy) Mario Benusiglio	9	5											10
23	(Italy) Mario Ferraris									7	6	Ret	DNS	10
24	(Italy) Andrea Gagliardini			6	8									9
25	(Italy) Michele Faccin			Ret	5									8
26	(Italy) Omar Galbiati	7	7											8
27	(Italy) Andrea Perlini	8	**11**	15	14	11	14	8	**9**					8
28	(Italy) Antonio de Castro	13	10	19	16			10	7					6
29	(Italy) Sabino de Castro			19	16			10	7					5
30	(Italy) Gabriele Sabatini	Ret	DNS	Ret	DNS	12	11	9	8			16	16	5
31	(Italy) Massimiliano Colombo			13	7									4
32	(Italy) Marco Fumagalli	Ret	9	17	18	13	13	13	10					3
33	(Italy) Gabriele Marotta	16	15	21	20	17	17	14	14	9	10	15	14	3
34	(Italy) Emanuele Rossi											11	9	2
35	(Italy) Riccardo Bianco			9	13									2
35	(Italy) Sergio Parato			9	13									2
36	(Italy) Maurizio Ardigò			12	12	10	10					13	12	2
37	(Switzerland) Fabio Venier	10	13	Ret	DNS	14	15	DNS	DNS					1
38	(Italy) Bruno Barbaro	13	10											1
39	(Italy) Guido Formilli Fendi											10	17†	1
40	(Italy) Diego Alessi	Ret	DNS	10	Ret									1
	(Italy) Gianni Checcoli	14	16	18	11	15	12	11	11					0
	(Italy) Michele Merendino			18	11									0
	(Italy) Stefano d'Aste	11	Ret											0
	(Italy) Giovanni Bassetti	12	12	14	15	15	12							0
	(Italy) Gianni Giudici	15	14	20	19	16	16	12	13					0
	(Italy) Emanuele Romani											12	13	0
	(Italy) Sergio Orsero											14	15	0
	(Italy) Giampaolo Tenchini											12	13	0
	(Italy) Sébastien Fortuna	Ret	DNS	16	17									0
	(Italy) Paolo Meroni	18	17											0
	(Italy) Mauro Simoncini	18	17											0
	(Italy) Gianluca Pizzuti	17	DNS	22	21									0
	(Italy) Ferdinando Geri									Ret	Ret			0
	(Italy) Fabrizio Fede											Ret	DNS	0
	(Italy) Andrea Palma											Ret	DNS	0
	(Italy) Ivano Costa											DNS	DNS	0
	(Italy) Stefano Maestri											DNS	DNS	0
Pos	Driver	MON (Italy)		IMO (Italy)		ALG (Portugal)		HOC (Germany)		CPR (France)		VAL (Italy)		Pts

Colour	Result
Gold	Winner
Silver	Second place
Bronze	Third place
Green	Points classification
Blue	Non-points classification
Blue	Non-classified finish (NC)
Purple	Retired, not classified (Ret)
Red	Did not qualify (DNQ)
Red	Did not pre-qualify (DNPQ)
Black	Disqualified (DSQ)
White	Did not start (DNS)
White	Withdrew (WD)
White	Race cancelled (C)
Blank	Did not practice (DNP)
Blank	Did not arrive (DNA)
Blank	Excluded (EX)

**Bold** – Pole
Italics – Fastest Lap

† - Drivers did not finish the race, but were classified as they completed over 50% of the race distance.

=== Teams' Championship ===
Pos	Team	Manufacturer	Points
1	(Italy) AF Corse	Ferrari; Maserati	254
2	(Italy) Vittoria Competizioni	Ferrari	243
3	(Italy) Racing Team Edil Cris	Ferrari	119
4	(Italy) Scuderia La.Na.	Ferrari	73
5	(Italy) Easy Race	Ferrari	67
6	(Italy) Romeo Ferraris	Ferrari; Porsche	51
7	(Italy) Scuderia 22	Corvette	37
8	(United States) Seminole Racing Team	Porsche	25
9	(Italy) Aurora Racing Team	Ferrari	25
10	(Italy) GDL Racing	Porsche	19
11	(Italy) Mik Corse	Lamborghini	14
12	(Italy) Scuderia Giudici	Lotus; Porsche; Dodge	13
13	(Italy) Star Cars	Porsche	9
14	(Italy) Antonelli Motorsport	Porsche	8
15	(Italy) AB Motorsport	Porsche	6
16	(Italy) FR Competition	Ferrari	5
17	(Italy) Red Zone	Porsche	2
18	(Switzerland) Swiss Team	Maserati	1
	(Italy) PB Racing	Lotus	0
	(Italy) M Racing	Porsche	0
	(Italy) Happy Racer	Ginetta	0
	(Italy) Fortuna Racing	Porsche	0
	(Italy) Lanza Motorsport	Nissan	0
	(Italy) ZRS Motorsport	Porsche	0

=== GT2 Class ===
Pos	Team	Manufacturer	Points
1	(Italy) Alessandro Bonetti	Ferrari	204
1	(Italy) Maurizio Mediani	Ferrari	204
2	(Italy) Nicola Cadei	Ferrari	202
3	(Monaco) Cédric Sbirrazzuoli	Ferrari	166
4	(Italy) Glauco Solieri	Ferrari	129
5	(Italy) Michele Rugolo	Ferrari	67
6	(Italy) Marco Cioci	Ferrari	31
6	(Italy) Piergiuseppe Perazzini	Ferrari	31
7	(Italy) Antonio de Castro	Porsche	30
8	(Portugal) Francisco Cruz	Ferrari	26
9	(Switzerland) Daniele Perfetti	Porsche	25
10	(United States) Robert Kaufmann	Ferrari	20
11	(Italy) Marco Cassera	Ferrari	18
11	(Italy) Stefano Pozzi	Ferrari	18
12	(Italy) Bruno Barbaro	Porsche	16
13	(Italy) Sabino de Castro	Porsche	14
14	(Italy) Michele Faccin	Ferrari	8

=== GT3 Class ===
Pos	Team	Manufacturer	Points
1	(Italy) Carlo Graziani	Corvette; Lamborghini	187
2	(Italy) Gabriele Sabatini	Ferrari	92
3	(Italy) Fabrizio Armetta	Corvette	43
4	(Italy) Dario Paletto	Porsche	43
4	(Italy) Giorgio Piodi	Porsche	43
5	(Italy) Marco Cioci	Corvette	42
6	(Italy) Diego Alessi	Corvette	16
	(Italy) Ferdinando Geri	Lamborghini	0
	(Italy) Ivano Costa	Lamborghini	0

=== GTCup Class ===
Pos	Team	Manufacturer	Points
1	(Italy) Thomas Kemenater	Ferrari	173
2	(Italy) Alessandra Neri	Ferrari	158
3	(Italy) Andrea Dromedari	Ferrari	139
4	(Italy) Matteo Manzo	Ferrari	111
5	(Italy) Davide Amaduzzi	Ferrari	83
6	(Italy) Andrea Perlini	Porsche	61
7	(Italy) Mauro Trentin	Ferrari	54
8	(Italy) Gianni Checcoli	Ferrari	47
9	(Italy) Marco Mapelli	Ferrari	45
10	(Italy) Marco Fumagalli	Porsche	42
11	(Italy) Andrea Gagliardini	Porsche	36
12	(Italy) Giovanni Bassetti	Ferrari	33
13	(Italy) Mario Benusiglio	Ferrari	29
14	(Italy) Massimiliano Colombo	Ferrari	27
15	(Italy) Mario Ferraris	Porsche	27
16	(Italy) Omar Galbiati	Porsche	24
17	(Italy) Riccardo Bianco	Porsche	16
17	(Italy) Sergio Parato	Porsche	16
18	(Italy) Guido Formilli Fendi	Porsche	16
19	(Italy) Emanuele Romani	Porsche	16
20	(Italy) Michele Merendino	Ferrari	8
21	(Italy) Sébastien Fortuna	Porsche	4
	(Italy) Fabrizio Fede	Ferrari	0
	(Italy) Andrea Palma	Ferrari	0
	(Italy) Stefano Maestri	Porsche	0

=== GT4 Class ===
Pos	Team	Manufacturer	Points
1	(Italy) Gabriele Marotta	Maserati	222
2	(Switzerland) Fabio Venier	Maserati	86
3	(Italy) Sergio Orsero	Ginetta	36
3	(Italy) Giampaolo Tenchini	Ginetta	36
4	(Italy) Gianluca Pizzuti	Porsche	30
5	(Italy) Paolo Meroni	Nissan	22
5	(Italy) Mauro Simoncini	Nissan	22
6	(Italy) Stefano d'Aste	Lotus	16

=== GTS Class ===
Pos	Team	Manufacturer	Points
1	(Italy) Maurizio Ardigò	Dodge	116
2	(Italy) Emanuele Rossi	Porsche	43
3	(Italy) Antonio de Castro	Porsche	43
3	(Italy) Sabino de Castro	Porsche	43
4	(Italy) Gianluca Pizzuti	Porsche	22

=== GT4S Class ===
Pos	Team	Manufacturer	Points
1	(Italy) Gianni Giudici	Lotus	172
