= 2011 International GTSprint Series =

Seasons
- ← 2010 2012 →

The 2011 International GTSprint Series season was the second year of the International GTSprint Series. The season began at Monza on 10 April and finished at Vallelunga on 9 October. Gaetano Ardagna and Giuseppe Cirò won the championship, driving a Ferrari.

== Teams and drivers ==
Team	Car	No.	Drivers	Class	Rounds
(Italy) AF Corse	Ferrari F430	20	(Venezuela) Gaetano Ardagna	GT2	All
(Italy) AF Corse	Ferrari F430	20	(Italy) Giuseppe Cirò	GT2	All
(Italy) AF Corse	Ferrari F430	26	(United States) Robert Kauffman	GT2	4
(Italy) AF Corse	Ferrari 458	31	(Italy) Nicola Cadei	GT3	All
(Italy) AF Corse	Ferrari 458	31	(Italy) Fabio Mancini	GT3	All
(Italy) Vittoria Competizioni	Ferrari F430	21	(Italy) Giacomo Barri	GT2	All
(Italy) Vittoria Competizioni	Ferrari F430	27	(Italy) Andrea Palma	GT2	All
(Italy) Vittoria Competizioni	Ferrari F430	27	(Italy) Massimiliano Mugelli	GT2	All
(Italy) Vittoria Competizioni	Ferrari F430	43	(Italy) Alessandra Neri	GTCup	All
(Italy) Vittoria Competizioni	Ferrari F430	43	(Italy) Cesare Brusa	GTCup	1-4
(Italy) Vittoria Competizioni	Ferrari F430	43	(Italy) Oscar Vettore	GTCup	6-7
(Italy) Racing Team Edil Cris	Ferrari F430	22	(Italy) Glauco Solieri	GT2	1-3
(Italy) Racing Team Edil Cris	Ferrari F430	22	(Italy) Matteo Cressoni	GT2	1-2, 4-7
(Italy) Racing Team Edil Cris	Ferrari F430	23	(Italy) Michael Dalle Stelle	GT2	All
(Italy) Autorlando Motorsport	Porsche 997	24	(Italy) Glauco Solieri	GT2	4-7
(Italy) Autorlando Motorsport	Porsche 997	34	(Italy) Maurizio Fratti	GT3	6
(Italy) RC Motorsport	Corvette Z06	30	(Italy) Roberto Del Castello	GT3	1-5
(Italy) RC Motorsport	Corvette Z06	30	(Italy) Michele Merendino	GT3	7
(Italy) RC Motorsport	Corvette Z06	30	(Italy) Piero Necchi	GT3	7
(Switzerland) Kessel Racing	Ferrari F430	32	(Italy) Massimo Mantovani	GT3	1, 6
(Switzerland) Kessel Racing	Ferrari 458	32	(Italy) Massimo Mantovani	GT3	4, 7
(Switzerland) Kessel Racing	Ferrari F430	37	(Spain) Antonio de la Reina	GT3	7
(Switzerland) Kessel Racing	Ferrari F430	37	(Colombia) Steven Goldstein	GT3	7
(Switzerland) Kessel Racing	Ferrari F430	40	(Italy) Pietro Negra	GTCup	1
(Switzerland) Kessel Racing	Ferrari F430	40	(Italy) Moreno Petrini	GTCup	1-2, 4-7
(Switzerland) Kessel Racing	Ferrari F430	40	(Italy) Roberto Sorti	GTCup	2-7
(Switzerland) Kessel Racing	Ferrari F430	41	(Spain) Antonio de la Reina	GTCup	1-6
(Switzerland) Kessel Racing	Ferrari F430	41	(Colombia) Steven Goldstein	GTCup	1-6
(Switzerland) Kessel Racing	Ferrari F430	42	(Italy) Gianfranco Bocellari	GTCup	4-7
(Switzerland) Kessel Racing	Ferrari F430	42	(Italy) Roberto Delli Guanti	GTCup	4-7
(Italy) Audi Sport Italia	Audi R8	35	(Italy) Alessandro Cicognani	GT3	6-7
(Italy) Rallysport	Lamborghini Gallardo	37	(Italy) Roberto Delli Guanti	GT3	1
(Italy) Rallysport	Lamborghini Gallardo	51	(Italy) Ferdinando Serafino	GTCup	4, 6
(Italy) M Racing	Porsche 997	44	(Italy) Emanuele Romani	GTCup	1, 6-7
(Italy) Mik Corse	Lamborghini Gallardo	45	(Italy) Carlo Graziani	GTCup	1-4, 7
(Italy) Mik Corse	Lamborghini Gallardo	46	(Italy) Andrea Mamè	GTCup	1
(Italy) Mik Corse	Lamborghini Gallardo	46	(Italy) Mirko Zanardini	GTCup	1
(Italy) Ebimotors	Porsche 997	47	(Italy) Giorgio Massazza	GTCup	1, 4, 6-7
(Italy) Ebimotors	Porsche 997	47	(Italy) Roberto Silva	GTCup	1, 4, 6-7
(Italy) Antonelli Motorsport	Porsche 997	48	(Italy) Omar Galbiati	GTCup	1, 6
(Italy) Antonelli Motorsport	Porsche 997	50	(Italy) Angelo Proietti	GTCup	1, 7
(Italy) Antonelli Motorsport	Porsche 997	63	(Italy) Marco Antonelli	GTCup	5-6
(Italy) Scuderia La.Na.	Ferrari F430	54	(Italy) Marco Luciani	GTCup	1
(Italy) Scuderia La.Na.	Ferrari F430	54	(Italy) Enrico Toccacelo	GTCup	1
(Italy) Scuderia La.Na.	Ferrari F430	55	(Italy) Davide Amaduzzi	GTCup	1-4
(Italy) Scuderia La.Na.	Ferrari F430	55	(Italy) Mauro Trentin	GTCup	1-4
(Italy) Scuderia La.Na.	Ferrari F430	55	(Italy) Gianmaria Gabbiani	GTCup	7
(Italy) Scuderia La.Na.	Ferrari F430	55	(Italy) Gianluca Nattoni	GTCup	7
(Italy) Scuderia La.Na.	Ferrari F430	56	(Italy) Marco Bassetto	GTCup	1
(Italy) Scuderia La.Na.	Ferrari F430	56	(Italy) Gianni Checcoli	GTCup	1
(Italy) Scuderia La.Na.	Ferrari F430	56	(Italy) Roberto Delli Guanti	GTCup	3
(Italy) Scuderia La.Na.	Ferrari F430	56	(Italy) Gianluca Nattoni	GTCup	4
(Italy) Scuderia La.Na.	Ferrari F430	56	(Italy) Oscar Vettore	GTCup	4
(Italy) Malucelli Motorsport	Ferrari F430	57	(San Marino) Marco Galassi	GTCup	2-7
(Italy) Malucelli Motorsport	Ferrari F430	99	(Italy) Flavio Pierleoni	GTCup	4, 6
(Italy) Scuderia Baldini 27 Mode	Ferrari F430	60	(Italy) Alessandro Bernasconi	GTCup	7
(Italy) Scuderia Baldini 27 Mode	Ferrari F430	60	(Italy) Lorenzo Casè	GTCup	7
(Italy) Scuderia Baldini 27 Mode	Ferrari F430	62	(Italy) Flavio Montrucchio	GTCup	4, 7
(Italy) Scuderia Baldini 27 Mode	Ferrari F430	62	(Italy) Antonio Paluan	GTCup	7
(Italy) Fortuna Racing	Porsche 997	61	(Italy) Sébastien Fortuna	GTCup	4
(Italy) GDL Racing	Porsche 997	64	(Italy) Ennio Ricci	GTCup	7
(Italy) GDL Racing	Porsche 997	64	(Italy) Angelo Schiatti	GTCup	7

== Calendar and results ==
Previously, the sixth round was scheduled in Hockenheim on 11 September, but it was canceled before the beginning of the season.

Round		Circuit	Date	Pole position	Fastest lap	Winning driver	Winning team
1	R1	(Italy) Autodromo Nazionale Monza, Monza	10 April	(Italy) Michael Dalle Stelle	(Italy) Nicola Cadei	(Italy) Massimiliano Mugelli	(Italy) Vittoria Competizioni
1	R2	(Italy) Autodromo Nazionale Monza, Monza	10 April	(Italy) Michael Dalle Stelle	(Italy) Andrea Palma	(Italy) Andrea Palma	(Italy) Vittoria Competizioni
2	R1	(Spain) Circuit Ricardo Tormo, Cheste	8 May	(Italy) Massimiliano Mugelli	(Italy) Nicola Cadei	(Italy) Nicola Cadei	(Italy) AF Corse
2	R2	(Spain) Circuit Ricardo Tormo, Cheste	8 May	(Italy) Andrea Palma	(Italy) Giacomo Barri	(Italy) Andrea Palma	(Italy) Vittoria Competizioni
3	R1	(Portugal) Autódromo Internacional do Algarve, Portimão	22 May	(Italy) Giuseppe Cirò	(Italy) Giuseppe Cirò	(Italy) Giuseppe Cirò	(Italy) AF Corse
3	R2	(Portugal) Autódromo Internacional do Algarve, Portimão	22 May	(Venezuela) Gaetano Ardagna	(Italy) Giacomo Barri	(Italy) Giacomo Barri	(Italy) Vittoria Competizioni
4	R1	(Italy) Misano World Circuit, Misano Adriatico	10 July	(Venezuela) Gaetano Ardagna	(Italy) Matteo Cressoni	(Italy) Matteo Cressoni	(Italy) Racing Team Edil Cris
4	R2	(Italy) Misano World Circuit, Misano Adriatico	10 July	(Italy) Giuseppe Cirò	(Italy) Matteo Cressoni	(Italy) Giuseppe Cirò	(Italy) AF Corse
5	R1	(Belgium) Circuit de Spa-Francorchamps, Francorchamps	7 August	(Italy) Nicola Cadei	(Italy) Nicola Cadei	(Italy) Nicola Cadei	(Italy) AF Corse
5	R2	(Belgium) Circuit de Spa-Francorchamps, Francorchamps	7 August	(Italy) Fabio Mancini	(Italy) Matteo Cressoni	(Italy) Matteo Cressoni	(Italy) Racing Team Edil Cris
6	R1	(Italy) Autodromo Internazionale del Mugello, Scarperia	25 September	(Italy) Matteo Cressoni	(Italy) Giacomo Barri	(Italy) Matteo Cressoni	(Italy) Racing Team Edil Cris
6	R2	(Italy) Autodromo Internazionale del Mugello, Scarperia	25 September	(Italy) Matteo Cressoni	(Italy) Giacomo Barri	(Italy) Matteo Cressoni	(Italy) Racing Team Edil Cris
7	R1	(Italy) ACI Vallelunga Circuit, Campagnano	9 October	(Italy) Giuseppe Cirò	(Italy) Piero Necchi	(Italy) Giuseppe Cirò	(Italy) AF Corse
7	R2	(Italy) ACI Vallelunga Circuit, Campagnano	9 October	(Venezuela) Gaetano Ardagna	(Italy) Giacomo Barri	(Italy) Glauco Solieri	(Italy) Autorlando Motorsport

== Championship Standings ==
=== Drivers' championship ===
Only the best 12 results counted towards the championship.

Pos	Driver	MON (Italy)		VNC (Spain)		ALG (Portugal)		MIS (Italy)		SPA (Belgium)		MUG (Italy)		VAL (Italy)		Pts
1	(Venezuela) Gaetano Ardagna	3	(7)	5	5	**1**	**5**	**17**	**1**	3	2	2	5	**1**	**2**	165
1	(Italy) Giuseppe Cirò	3	(7)	5	5	**1**	**5**	**17**	**1**	3	2	2	5	**1**	**2**	165
2	(Italy) Matteo Cressoni	19†	4	2	4			1	2	2	1	**1**	**1**	DSQ	6	155
3	(Italy) Nicola Cadei	2	3	1	DSQ	5	3	6	(10)	**1**	**7**	4	3	5	3	143
3	(Italy) Fabio Mancini	2	3	1	DSQ	5	3	6	(10)	**1**	**7**	4	3	5	3	143
4	(Italy) Massimiliano Mugelli	1	1	**4**	**1**	4	6	3	5	14†	6	5	4	6	(7)	138
4	(Italy) Andrea Palma	1	1	**4**	**1**	4	6	3	5	14†	6	5	4	6	(7)	138
5	(Italy) Giacomo Barri	18†	5	3	2	2	1	5	4	6	5	3	2	Ret	20†	134
6	(Italy) Michael Dalle Stelle	**Ret**	**2**	6	3	3	2	2	3	5	4	8	Ret	9	5	119
7	(Italy) Glauco Solieri	19†	4	2	4	7	7	4	(9)	4	3	6	7	3	1	117
8	(Italy) Roberto Del Castello	4	16†	7	7	6	4	8	6	Ret	14†					43
9	(Italy) Massimo Mantovani	5	6					7	7			9	6	8	8	36
10	(Spain) Antonio de la Reina	8	12	10	6	8	9	11	11	8	10	12	13	7	19†	28
10	(Colombia) Steven Goldstein	8	12	10	6	8	9	11	11	8	10	12	13	7	19†	28
11	(Italy) Alessandro Cicognani											7	8	4	4	27
12	(Italy) Michele Merendino													2	18†	16
12	(Italy) Piero Necchi													2	18†	16
13	(Italy) Carlo Graziani	11	11	8	8	13†	DNS	15	21†					Ret	Ret	12
14	(Italy) Marco Antonelli									7	8	10	9			10
15	(Italy) Davide Amaduzzi	15	13	11	DNS	9	8	14	13	11	Ret					6
15	(Italy) Mauro Trentin	15	13	11	DNS	9	8	14	13	11	Ret					6
16	(Italy) Alessandra Neri	14	Ret	9	Ret	11	12	12	18	9	9	15†	17	17	13	6
17	(Italy) Giorgio Massazza	10	14					10	14			Ret	Ret	11	14	6
17	(Italy) Roberto Silva	10	14					10	14			Ret	Ret	11	14	6
18	(United States) Robert Kauffman							9	8							5
19	(San Marino) Marco Galassi			12	9	10	10	16	15	12	12	16	15†	12	11	4
20	(Italy) Moreno Petrini	12	20†	13	10			18	20	13	13	14	16	DSQ	21†	3
21	(Italy) Cesare Brusa	14	Ret	9	Ret	11	12	12	18							2
22	(Italy) Alessandro Bernasconi													Ret	9	2
22	(Italy) Lorenzo Casè													Ret	9	2
23	(Italy) Paolo Negra	12	20†													2
24	(Italy) Roberto Sorti			13	10	12	11	18	20	13	13	14	16	DSQ	21†	1
25	(Italy) Roberto Delli Guanti	16	15			Ret	Ret	21†	16	10	11	13	14	14	15	1
26	(Italy) Gianfranco Bocellari							21†	16	10	11	13	14	14	15	1
27	(Italy) Flavio Pierleoni							DNS	DNS			11	10			1
28	(Italy) Gianluca Nattoni							20	17					16	10	1
29	(Italy) Gianmaria Gabbiani													16	10	1
30	(Italy) Emanuele Romani	13	18									DSQ	12	13	17	1
	(Italy) Sébastien Fortuna							13	12							0
	(Italy) Oscar Vettore							20	17			15†	17	17	13	0
	(Italy) Flavio Montrucchio							19	19					15	16	0
	(Italy) Antonio Paluan													15	16	0
	(Italy) Marco Bassetto	17	19†													0
	(Italy) Gianni Checcoli	17	19†													0
	(Italy) Marco Luciani	Ret	17													0
	(Italy) Enrico Toccacelo	Ret	17													0
	(Italy) Ferdinando Serafino							Ret	DNS			Ret	DNS			0
	(Italy) Angelo Proietti	(6)	(8)											Ret	DNS	0
guest drivers ineligible for points
	(Italy) Andrea Mamè	7	9													0
	(Italy) Mirko Zanardini	7	9													0
	(Italy) Omar Galbiati	9	10									Ret	11			0
	(Italy) Ennio Ricci													10	12	0
	(Italy) Angelo Schiatti													10	12	0
Pos	Driver	MON (Italy)		VNC (Spain)		ALG (Portugal)		MIS (Italy)		SPA (Belgium)		MUG (Italy)		VAL (Italy)		Pts

Colour	Result
Gold	Winner
Silver	Second place
Bronze	Third place
Green	Points classification
Blue	Non-points classification
Blue	Non-classified finish (NC)
Purple	Retired, not classified (Ret)
Red	Did not qualify (DNQ)
Red	Did not pre-qualify (DNPQ)
Black	Disqualified (DSQ)
White	Did not start (DNS)
White	Withdrew (WD)
White	Race cancelled (C)
Blank	Did not practice (DNP)
Blank	Did not arrive (DNA)
Blank	Excluded (EX)

**Bold** – Pole
Italics – Fastest Lap

† - Drivers did not finish the race, but were classified as they completed over 50% of the race distance.

=== Teams' Championship ===
Pos	Team	Manufacturer	Points
1	(Italy) AF Corse	Ferrari	316
2	(Italy) Racing Team Edil Cris	Ferrari	282
3	(Italy) Vittoria Competizioni	Ferrari	280
4	(Italy) Autorlando Motorsport	Porsche	76
5	(Switzerland) Kessel Racing	Ferrari	66
6	(Italy) RC Motorsport	Corvette	59
7	(Italy) Audi Sport Italia	Audi	27
8	(Italy) Mik Corse	Lamborghini	12
9	(Italy) Antonelli Motorsport	Porsche	10
10	(Italy) Scuderia La.Na.	Ferrari	7
11	(Italy) Malucelli Motorsport	Ferrari	5
12	(Italy) Ebimotors	Porsche	5
13	(Italy) Scuderia Baldini 27 Mode	Ferrari	2
14	(Italy) M Racing	Porsche	1
	(Italy) Fortuna Racing	Porsche	0
	(Italy) Rallysport	Lamborghini	0
Guest teams ineligible for points
	(Italy) GDL Racing	Porsche	0

=== GT2 Class ===
Pos	Driver	Manufacturer	Points
1	(Italy) Matteo Cressoni	Ferrari	184
2	(Venezuela) Gaetano Ardagna	Ferrari	180
2	(Italy) Giuseppe Cirò	Ferrari	180
3	(Italy) Massimiliano Mugelli	Ferrari	157
3	(Italy) Andrea Palma	Ferrari	157
4	(Italy) Giacomo Barri	Ferrari	153
5	(Italy) Glauco Solieri	Ferrari; Porsche	146
6	(Italy) Michael Dalle Stelle	Ferrari	138
7	(United States) Robert Kauffman	Ferrari	12

=== GT3 Class ===
Pos	Driver	Manufacturer	Points
1	(Italy) Nicola Cadei	Ferrari	246
1	(Italy) Fabio Mancini	Ferrari	246
2	(Italy) Roberto Del Castello	Corvette	140
3	(Italy) Massimo Mantovani	Ferrari	105
4	(Italy) Alessandro Cicognani	Audi	57
5	(Italy) Michele Merendino	Corvette	33
5	(Italy) Piero Necchi	Corvette	33
6	(Italy) Roberto Delli Guanti	Lamborghini	22
7	(Spain) Antonio de la Reina	Ferrari	18
7	(Colombia) Steven Goldstein	Ferrari	18
	(Italy) Maurizio Fratti	Porsche	0

=== GTCup Class ===
Pos	Driver	Manufacturer	Points
1	(Spain) Antonio de la Reina	Ferrari	191
1	(Colombia) Steven Goldstein	Ferrari	191
2	(San Marino) Marco Galassi	Ferrari	107
3	(Italy) Alessandra Neri	Ferrari	104
4	(Italy) Davide Amaduzzi	Ferrari	92
4	(Italy) Mauro Trentin	Ferrari	92
5	(Italy) Giorgio Massazza	Porsche	87
5	(Italy) Roberto Silva	Porsche	87
6	(Italy) Marco Antonelli	Porsche	86
7	(Italy) Carlo Graziani	Lamborghini	81
8	(Italy) Roberto Delli Guanti	Ferrari	60
9	(Italy) Gianfranco Bocellari	Ferrari	60
10	(Italy) Roberto Sorti	Ferrari	60
11	(Italy) Moreno Petrini	Ferrari	55
12	(Italy) Cesare Brusa	Ferrari	54
13	(Italy) Emanuele Romani	Porsche	43
14	(Italy) Flavio Pierleoni	Ferrari	30
15	(Italy) Oscar Vettore	Ferrari	29
16	(Italy) Gianluca Nattoni	Ferrari	27
17	(Italy) Sébastien Fortuna	Porsche	25
18	(Italy) Alessandro Bernasconi	Ferrari	21
18	(Italy) Lorenzo Casè	Ferrari	21
19	(Italy) Gianmaria Gabbiani	Ferrari	21
20	(Italy) Flavio Montrucchio	Ferrari	17
21	(Italy) Pietro Negra	Ferrari	13
22	(Italy) Angelo Paluan	Ferrari	12
23	(Italy) Marco Luciani	Ferrari	8
23	(Italy) Enrico Toccacelo	Ferrari	8
24	(Italy) Marco Bassetto	Ferrari	7
24	(Italy) Gianni Checcoli	Ferrari	7
	(Italy) Ferdinando Serafino	Lamborghini	0
	(Italy) Angelo Proietti	Porsche	0
Guest drivers ineligible for points
	(Italy) Ennio Ricci	Porsche	0
	(Italy) Angelo Schiatti	Porsche	0
	(Italy) Andrea Mamè	Lamborghini	0
	(Italy) Mirko Zanardini	Lamborghini	0
	(Italy) Omar Galbiati	Porsche	0
