= 2010 24 Hours of Spa =

2010 Total Spa 24 Hours

Seasons
- ← 2009 2011 →

Layout of the Circuit de Spa-Francorchamps

The 2010 Total 24 Hours of Spa was the 63rd running of the Spa 24 Hours. The race took place at Circuit de Spa-Francorchamps between 31 July and 1 August 2010. Following the break-up of the FIA GT Championship, the 2010 running of the Spa 24 Hours served as part of the FIA GT2 European Cup, with cars from the GT3, GT4, and national-level GT categories also being allowed to participate. Due to a transaxle gearbox the BMW M3 GT2 was not allowed to compete in the GT2 class, forcing them to race in GTN instead. This was the last year GT2 cars were eligible for the race.

Shortly after the start it was becoming a 3-class car battle with the #2 Ferrari, #50 Audi and #79 BMW. The #2 Ferrari with Gianmaria Bruni behind the wheel quickly build up a sizeable gap over the rest of the field, but small problems threw them back to 2nd position. Shortly into the night the second place #2 Ferrari and the 3rd place #50 Audi collided and both cars were retired. Late into the night, the safety car gave a one lap advantage to the lead BMW. The positions remained there until the last half hour of the race when the #79 BMW got a suspension problem and went straight into Pouhon, allowing the two Porsches to take the two top spots. The race was won by the BMS Scuderia Italia Porsche, the second 24 Hours of Spa victory for the team and fifth for the manufacturer. Local team Mühlner Motorsport also earned Porsche the GT3 category win after all the leading Audis and Ford retired. Aston Martin's Jota Sport won the GT4 category.

== Qualifying ==
=== Qualifying result ===
Class leaders are in bold, the fastest lap for each car is in gray.

| Pos | No. | Team | Class | Qualifying 1 | Qualifying 2 | Qualifying 3 | Grid |
|---|---|---|---|---|---|---|---|
| 1 | **2** | **AF Corse; ALD Team Vitaphone** | **GT2** | **2:28.296** | **2:22.403** | **2:23.086** | **1** |
| 2 | **79** | **BMW Motorsport** | **GTN** | **2:28.164** | **2:22.549** | **2:24.419** | **2** |
| 3 | **50** | **Phoenix Racing** | **GT3** | **2:24.608** | **2:22.807** | **2:24.605** | **3** |
| 4 | 51 | Phoenix Racing | GT3 | 2:23.964 | 2:23.206 | 2:23.022 | 4 |
| 5 | 84 | Reiter Engineering | GT3 | 2:27.046 | 2:35.757 | 2:23.252 | 5 |
| 6 | 78 | BMW Motorsport | GTN | 2:26.954 | 2:24.302 | 2:23.531 | 6 |
| 7 | 16 | IMSA Performance Matmut | GT2 | 2:26.338 | 2:23.960 | 2:27.011 | 7 |
| 8 | 13 | Prospeed Competition | GT2 | 2:30.738 | 2:25.839 | 2:24.456 | 8 |
| 9 | 73 | WRT Belgian Audi Club | GT3 | 2:28.581 | 2:25.603 | 2:24.659 | 9 |
| 10 | 60 | Prospeed Competition | GT3 | 2:31.945 | 2:24.909 | 2:24.775 | 10 |
| 11 | 23 | BMS Scuderia Italia | GT2 | 2:30.923 | 2:26.035 | 2:24.887 | 11 |
| 12 | 99 | Marc VDS Racing Team | GT3 | 2:33.834 | 2:25.270 | 2:26.492 | 12 |
| 13 | 72 | WRT Belgian Audi Club | GT3 | 2:26.912 | 2:25.388 | 2:27.659 | 13 |
| 14 | 74 | WRT Belgian Audi Club | GT3 | 2:28.944 | 2:25.702 | 2:35.438 | 14 |
| 15 | 61 | Prospeed Competition | GT3 | 2:29.316 | 2:30.392 | 2:25.706 | 15 |
| 16 | 68 | United Autosports | GT3 | 2:31.924 | 2:31.139 | 2:25.745 | 16 |
| 17 | 81 | Gravity International | GTN | 2:26.033 | 2:25.764 | 2:29.700 | 17 |
| 18 | 86 | Gulf Team First | GT3 | 2:27.351 | 2:54.625 | 2:25.964 | 18 |
| 19 | 1 | AF Corse | GT2 | 2:27.477 | 2:27.510 | 2:27.072 | 19 |
| 20 | 98 | Marc VDS Racing Team | GT3 | 2:31.430 | 2:27.193 | 2:32.862 | 20 |
| 21 | 67 | United Autosports | GT3 | 2:40.645 | 2:29.127 | 2:27.220 | 21 |
| 22 | 4 | Prospeed Competition | GT2 | 2:32.792 | 2:27.488 | 2:31.774 | 22 |
| 23 | 56 | Sport Garage | GT3 | 2:30.685 | 2:41.259 | 2:28.826 | 23 |
| 24 | 17 | IMSA Performance Matmut | GT2 | 2:28.983 | 2:30.365 | 2:33.690 | 24 |
| 25 | 71 | Team RPM | GT3 | 2:30.167 | 2:37.166 | 2:29.203 | 25 |
| 26 | 7 | Trackspeed | GT2 | 2:36.807 | 2:32.506 | 2:29.328 | 26 |
| 27 | 85 | Gulf Team First | GT3 | 2:29.931 | 2:29.336 | 2:31.366 | 27 |
| 28 | 64 | BRS Aston Martin Racing | GT3 | 2:29.978 | 2:32.818 | 2:31.597 | 28 |
| 29 | 55 | Sport Garage | GT3 | 2:30.275 | 2:30.147 | 2:31.091 | 29 |
| 30 | 53 | Mühlner Motorsport | GT3 | 2:30.761 | 2:32.774 | No Time | 30 |
| 31 | 66 | Jet Alliance | GTN | 2:30.761 | 2:40.276 | 2:32.580 | 31 |
| 32 | 52 | Mühlner Motorsport | GT3 | 2:50.278 | No Time | 2:31.199 | 32 |
| 33 | 100 | First Motorsport | GTN | 2:45.756 | 2:31.351 | 2:36.257 | 33 |
| 34 | 92 | G2 Racing | GT3 | 2:35.861 | 2:32.729 | 2:47.755 | 34 |
| 35 | 58 | VDS Racing Aventures | GT3 | 2:43.570 | 2:37.995 | 2:37.182 | 35 |
| 36 | **62** | **RJN Motorsport** | **GT4** | **2:50.149** | **2:41.937** | **2:39.099** | **36** |
| 37 | 59 | Team Jota | GT4 | 2:43.773 | 2:40.789 | 2:55.197 | 37 |
| 38 | 63 | BRS Aston Martin Racing | GT3 | 2:52.682 | 2:46.935 | 2:43.154 | 38 |
| 39 | 91 | EBRT/Level Racing | GTN | 3:00.830 | 2:58.774 | 2:43.349 | 39 |
| 40 | 70 | Speedlover | GT4 | 3:04.141 | 2:52.540 | 2:47.881 | 40 |

== Race ==
=== Race result ===
| Pos | Class | No | Team | Drivers | Chassis | Tyre | Laps |
| Pos | Class | No | Team | Drivers | Engine | Tyre | Laps |
|---|---|---|---|---|---|---|---|
| 1 | GT2 | 23 | (Italy) BMS Scuderia Italia | (France) Romain Dumas (Austria) Martin Ragginger (Germany) Jörg Bergmeister (Germany) Wolf Henzler | Porsche 997 GT3-RSR | M | 541 |
| 1 | GT2 | 23 | (Italy) BMS Scuderia Italia | (France) Romain Dumas (Austria) Martin Ragginger (Germany) Jörg Bergmeister (Germany) Wolf Henzler | Porsche 4.0 L Flat-6 | M | 541 |
| 2 | GT2 | 16 | (France) IMSA Performance Matmut | (France) Raymond Narac (France) Patrick Pilet (United States) Patrick Long (Austria) Richard Lietz | Porsche 997 GT3-RSR | M | 541 |
| 2 | GT2 | 16 | (France) IMSA Performance Matmut | (France) Raymond Narac (France) Patrick Pilet (United States) Patrick Long (Austria) Richard Lietz | Porsche 4.0 L Flat-6 | M | 541 |
| 3 | GTN | 79 | (Germany) BMW Motorsport | (Germany) Dirk Werner (Germany) Dirk Müller (Germany) Dirk Adorf | BMW M3 GT2 | D | 540 |
| 3 | GTN | 79 | (Germany) BMW Motorsport | (Germany) Dirk Werner (Germany) Dirk Müller (Germany) Dirk Adorf | BMW 4.0 L V8 | D | 540 |
| 4 | GTN | 78 | (Germany) BMW Motorsport | (Germany) Jörg Müller (Germany) Uwe Alzen (Portugal) Pedro Lamy | BMW M3 GT2 | D | 534 |
| 4 | GTN | 78 | (Germany) BMW Motorsport | (Germany) Jörg Müller (Germany) Uwe Alzen (Portugal) Pedro Lamy | BMW 4.0 L V8 | D | 534 |
| 5 | GT2 | 1 | (Italy) AF Corse (Germany) ALD Team Vitaphone | (United States) Michael Waltrip (United States) Robert Kauffman (Italy) Niki Cadei (Italy) Marco Cioci | Ferrari F430 GTE | M | 519 |
| 5 | GT2 | 1 | (Italy) AF Corse (Germany) ALD Team Vitaphone | (United States) Michael Waltrip (United States) Robert Kauffman (Italy) Niki Cadei (Italy) Marco Cioci | Ferrari 4.0 L V8 | M | 519 |
| 6 | GT3 | 53 | (Belgium) Mühlner Motorsport | (Germany) Jürgen Häring (Greece) Dimitrios Konstantinou (France) Gilles Vannelet (France) Arnaud Peyroles | Porsche 997 GT3-R | M | 518 |
| 6 | GT3 | 53 | (Belgium) Mühlner Motorsport | (Germany) Jürgen Häring (Greece) Dimitrios Konstantinou (France) Gilles Vannelet (France) Arnaud Peyroles | Porsche 4.0 L Flat-6 | M | 518 |
| 7 | GT2 | 4 | (Belgium) Prospeed Competition | (Netherlands) Paul van Splunteren (Netherlands) Niek Hommerson (Netherlands) Phil Bastiaans (Belgium) Louis Machiels | Porsche 997 GT3-RSR | M | 515 |
| 7 | GT2 | 4 | (Belgium) Prospeed Competition | (Netherlands) Paul van Splunteren (Netherlands) Niek Hommerson (Netherlands) Phil Bastiaans (Belgium) Louis Machiels | Porsche 4.0 L Flat-6 | M | 515 |
| 8 | GT3 | 99 | (Belgium) Marc VDS Racing Team | (Belgium) Bas Leinders (Belgium) Maxime Martin (Belgium) Marc Duez | Ford GT GT3 | M | 512 |
| 8 | GT3 | 99 | (Belgium) Marc VDS Racing Team | (Belgium) Bas Leinders (Belgium) Maxime Martin (Belgium) Marc Duez | Ford 5.0 L V8 | M | 512 |
| 9 | GT3 | 68 | (United States) United Autosports | (South Africa) Mark Patterson (Sweden) Stefan Johansson (Hong Kong) Alain Li (United States) Emil Assentato | Audi R8 LMS | M | 503 |
| 9 | GT3 | 68 | (United States) United Autosports | (South Africa) Mark Patterson (Sweden) Stefan Johansson (Hong Kong) Alain Li (United States) Emil Assentato | Audi 5.2 L V10 | M | 503 |
| 10 | GT3 | 67 | (United States) United Autosports | (United States) Eddie Cheever (United States) Zak Brown (United Kingdom) Richard Dean (United Kingdom) Mark Blundell | Audi R8 LMS | M | 501 |
| 10 | GT3 | 67 | (United States) United Autosports | (United States) Eddie Cheever (United States) Zak Brown (United Kingdom) Richard Dean (United Kingdom) Mark Blundell | Audi 5.2 L V10 | M | 501 |
| 11 | GT2 | 7 | (United Kingdom) Trackspeed | (United Kingdom) David Ashburn (Sweden) Carl Rosenblad (Germany) Sebastian Asch (Germany) Tim Bergmeister | Porsche 997 GT3-RSR | A | 500 |
| 11 | GT2 | 7 | (United Kingdom) Trackspeed | (United Kingdom) David Ashburn (Sweden) Carl Rosenblad (Germany) Sebastian Asch (Germany) Tim Bergmeister | Porsche 4.0 L Flat-6 | A | 500 |
| 12 | GT2 | 17 | (France) IMSA Performance Matmut | (France) Jean-Philippe Belloc (France) Richard Balandras (France) Christophe Bourret (France) Pascal Gibon | Porsche 997 GT3-RSR | M | 498 |
| 12 | GT2 | 17 | (France) IMSA Performance Matmut | (France) Jean-Philippe Belloc (France) Richard Balandras (France) Christophe Bourret (France) Pascal Gibon | Porsche 4.0 L Flat-6 | M | 498 |
| 13 | GT3 | 73 | (Belgium) WRT Belgian Audi Club | (Monaco) Stéphane Ortelli (Belgium) Stéphane Lémeret (Belgium) François Verbist (Belgium) Kurt Mollekens | Audi R8 LMS | M | 497 |
| 13 | GT3 | 73 | (Belgium) WRT Belgian Audi Club | (Monaco) Stéphane Ortelli (Belgium) Stéphane Lémeret (Belgium) François Verbist (Belgium) Kurt Mollekens | Audi 5.2 L V10 | M | 497 |
| 14 | GT3 | 71 | (United Kingdom) Team RPM | (United Kingdom) Alex Mortimer (United Kingdom) Peter Bamford (Republic of Ireland) Matt Griffin | Ford GT GT3 | M | 492 |
| 14 | GT3 | 71 | (United Kingdom) Team RPM | (United Kingdom) Alex Mortimer (United Kingdom) Peter Bamford (Republic of Ireland) Matt Griffin | Ford 5.0 L V8 | M | 492 |
| 15 | GT3 | 60 | (Belgium) Prospeed Competition | (Netherlands) Jos Menten (Belgium) Julien Schroyen (Belgium) Maxime Soulet (Belgium) Oskar Slingerland | Porsche 997 GT3-R | M | 488 |
| 15 | GT3 | 60 | (Belgium) Prospeed Competition | (Netherlands) Jos Menten (Belgium) Julien Schroyen (Belgium) Maxime Soulet (Belgium) Oskar Slingerland | Porsche 4.0 L Flat-6 | M | 488 |
| 16 | GTN | 81 | (Belgium) Gravity International | (France) Romain Grosjean (Belgium) Vincent Radermecker (Netherlands) Ron Marchal (Italy) Diego Alessi | Mosler MT900R | M | 466 |
| 16 | GTN | 81 | (Belgium) Gravity International | (France) Romain Grosjean (Belgium) Vincent Radermecker (Netherlands) Ron Marchal (Italy) Diego Alessi | Chevrolet LS1 5.7 L V8 | M | 466 |
| 17 | GTN | 66 | (Austria) Jetalliance Racing | (Austria) Lukas Lichtner-Hoyer (Austria) Vitus Eckert (Germany) Marco Seefried (United Kingdom) Martin Rich | Porsche 997 GT3 Cup | M | 461 |
| 17 | GTN | 66 | (Austria) Jetalliance Racing | (Austria) Lukas Lichtner-Hoyer (Austria) Vitus Eckert (Germany) Marco Seefried (United Kingdom) Martin Rich | Porsche 3.6 L Flat-6 | M | 461 |
| 18 | GT3 | 56 | (France) Sport Garage | (France) André-Alain Corbel (France) Thomas Duchene (France) Christian Beroujon | BMW Alpina B6 GT3 | M | 441 |
| 18 | GT3 | 56 | (France) Sport Garage | (France) André-Alain Corbel (France) Thomas Duchene (France) Christian Beroujon | BMW 4.4 L Supercharged V8 | M | 441 |
| 19 | GTN | 58 | (Belgium) VDS Racing Adventures | (Belgium) Raphaël van der Straten (Belgium) Eric Qvick (Belgium) José Close (Saudi Arabia) Karim Al-Azhari | Ford Mustang FR500GT3 | M | 431 |
| 19 | GTN | 58 | (Belgium) VDS Racing Adventures | (Belgium) Raphaël van der Straten (Belgium) Eric Qvick (Belgium) José Close (Saudi Arabia) Karim Al-Azhari | Ford 5.0 L V8 | M | 431 |
| 20 | GT3 | 86 | (United Arab Emirates) Gulf Team First | (France) Didier André (France) Grégoire de Moustier (United Kingdom) Michael Wainwright (Germany) Roald Goethe | Lamborghini Gallardo LP560 GT3 | M | 410 |
| 20 | GT3 | 86 | (United Arab Emirates) Gulf Team First | (France) Didier André (France) Grégoire de Moustier (United Kingdom) Michael Wainwright (Germany) Roald Goethe | Lamborghini 5.2 L V10 | M | 410 |
| 21 | GT4 | 59 | (United Kingdom) Jota Sport | (United Kingdom) Sam Hancock (United Kingdom) Simon Dolan (New Zealand) Roger Wills (United Kingdom) Joe Twyman | Aston Martin V8 Vantage GT4 | M | 376 |
| 21 | GT4 | 59 | (United Kingdom) Jota Sport | (United Kingdom) Sam Hancock (United Kingdom) Simon Dolan (New Zealand) Roger Wills (United Kingdom) Joe Twyman | Aston Martin 4.7 L V8 | M | 376 |
| 22 | GT4 | 70 | (Belgium) Excelsior | (France) Sébastian Viale (Belgium) Michel de Coster (Belgium) Pascal Nelissen-Grade (Belgium) Rik Renmans | Aston Martin V8 Vantage GT4 | M | 338 |
| 22 | GT4 | 70 | (Belgium) Excelsior | (France) Sébastian Viale (Belgium) Michel de Coster (Belgium) Pascal Nelissen-Grade (Belgium) Rik Renmans | Aston Martin 4.7 L V8 | M | 338 |
| 23 | GT4 | 69 | (Belgium) Speed Lover | (Belgium) Patrick Deblauwe (Belgium) René Brugmans (Belgium) Didier Grandjean (Belgium) Jean-Michel Gérome | Porsche 997 GT3 | M | 333 |
| 23 | GT4 | 69 | (Belgium) Speed Lover | (Belgium) Patrick Deblauwe (Belgium) René Brugmans (Belgium) Didier Grandjean (Belgium) Jean-Michel Gérome | Porsche 3.6 L Flat-6 | M | 333 |
| 24 DNF | GT3 | 55 | (France) Sport Garage | (France) Gäel Lesoudier (France) Thierry Prignaud (France) Thierry Stépec (France) Romain Brandela | BMW Alpina B6 GT3 | M | 417 |
| 24 DNF | GT3 | 55 | (France) Sport Garage | (France) Gäel Lesoudier (France) Thierry Prignaud (France) Thierry Stépec (France) Romain Brandela | BMW 4.4 L Supercharged V8 | M | 417 |
| 25 DNF | GT3 | 85 | (United Arab Emirates) Gulf Team First | (France) Fabien Giroix (France) Frédéric Fatien (France) Anthony Beltoise (France) Jean-Pierre Valentini | Lamborghini Gallardo LP560 GT3 | M | 374 |
| 25 DNF | GT3 | 85 | (United Arab Emirates) Gulf Team First | (France) Fabien Giroix (France) Frédéric Fatien (France) Anthony Beltoise (France) Jean-Pierre Valentini | Lamborghini 5.2 L V10 | M | 374 |
| 26 DNF | GT3 | 64 | (Belgium) Brussels Racing | (Belgium) Eddy Renard (Belgium) Tim Verbergt (Belgium) Koen Wauters (Belgium) Jeffrey van Hooydonk | Aston Martin DBRS9 | M | 328 |
| 26 DNF | GT3 | 64 | (Belgium) Brussels Racing | (Belgium) Eddy Renard (Belgium) Tim Verbergt (Belgium) Koen Wauters (Belgium) Jeffrey van Hooydonk | Aston Martin 6.0 L V12 | M | 328 |
| 27 DNF | GT3 | 51 | (Germany) Phoenix Racing | (Italy) Andrea Piccini (Germany) Marc Hennerici (Switzerland) Henri Moser (Greece) Alexandros Margaritis | Audi R8 LMS | M | 325 |
| 27 DNF | GT3 | 51 | (Germany) Phoenix Racing | (Italy) Andrea Piccini (Germany) Marc Hennerici (Switzerland) Henri Moser (Greece) Alexandros Margaritis | Audi 5.2 L V10 | M | 325 |
| 28 DNF | GT2 | 2 | (Italy) AF Corse (Germany) ALD Team Vitaphone | (Belgium) Eric van de Poele (Belgium) Bert Longin (Italy) Gianmaria Bruni (Finland) Toni Vilander | Ferrari F430 GTE | M | 295 |
| 28 DNF | GT2 | 2 | (Italy) AF Corse (Germany) ALD Team Vitaphone | (Belgium) Eric van de Poele (Belgium) Bert Longin (Italy) Gianmaria Bruni (Finland) Toni Vilander | Ferrari 4.0 L V8 | M | 295 |
| 29 DNF | GT3 | 50 | (Germany) Phoenix Racing | (Germany) Mike Rockenfeller (Germany) Lucas Luhr (Switzerland) Marcel Fässler (Belgium) Anthony Kumpen | Audi R8 LMS | M | 294 |
| 29 DNF | GT3 | 50 | (Germany) Phoenix Racing | (Germany) Mike Rockenfeller (Germany) Lucas Luhr (Switzerland) Marcel Fässler (Belgium) Anthony Kumpen | Audi 5.2 L V10 | M | 294 |
| 30 DNF | GT3 | 98 | (Belgium) Marc VDS Racing Team | (Belgium) Eric De Doncker (Belgium) Renaud Kuppens (Finland) Markus Palttala | Ford GT GT3 | M | 249 |
| 30 DNF | GT3 | 98 | (Belgium) Marc VDS Racing Team | (Belgium) Eric De Doncker (Belgium) Renaud Kuppens (Finland) Markus Palttala | Ford 5.0 L V8 | M | 249 |
| 31 DNF | GTN | 91 | (Belgium) Level Racing | (Belgium) Philippe Broodcooren (Belgium) René Marin (Belgium) Christoff Corten (Italy) Bruno Barbaro | Porsche 997 GT3 Cup | M | 235 |
| 31 DNF | GTN | 91 | (Belgium) Level Racing | (Belgium) Philippe Broodcooren (Belgium) René Marin (Belgium) Christoff Corten (Italy) Bruno Barbaro | Porsche 3.6 L Flat-6 | M | 235 |
| 32 DNF | GT2 | 13 | (Belgium) Prospeed Competition | (Germany) Marco Holzer (Germany) Marc Lieb (United Kingdom) Richard Westbrook (Belgium) Marc Goossens | Porsche 997 GT3-RSR | M | 207 |
| 32 DNF | GT2 | 13 | (Belgium) Prospeed Competition | (Germany) Marco Holzer (Germany) Marc Lieb (United Kingdom) Richard Westbrook (Belgium) Marc Goossens | Porsche 4.0 L Flat-6 | M | 207 |
| 33 DNF | GT3 | 52 | (Belgium) Mühlner Motorsport | (Belgium) Armand Fumal (Belgium) Jérôme Thiry (Canada) Mark Thomas (Italy) Gianluca De Lorenzi | Porsche 997 GT3-R | M | 135 |
| 33 DNF | GT3 | 52 | (Belgium) Mühlner Motorsport | (Belgium) Armand Fumal (Belgium) Jérôme Thiry (Canada) Mark Thomas (Italy) Gianluca De Lorenzi | Porsche 4.0 L Flat-6 | M | 135 |
| 34 DNF | GT3 | 74 | (Belgium) WRT Belgian Audi Club | (France) David Tuchbant (France) Jean-Luc Blanchemain (Belgium) Christian Kelders (Belgium) Frédéric Bouvy | Audi R8 LMS | M | 127 |
| 34 DNF | GT3 | 74 | (Belgium) WRT Belgian Audi Club | (France) David Tuchbant (France) Jean-Luc Blanchemain (Belgium) Christian Kelders (Belgium) Frédéric Bouvy | Audi 5.2 L V10 | M | 127 |
| 35 DNF | GTN | 100 | (Belgium) First Motorsport | (Netherlands) Hoevert Vos (Netherlands) Jeroen Schothorst (Netherlands) Raymond Coronel (Netherlands) Harrie Kolen | Porsche 997 GT3 Cup S | M | 91 |
| 35 DNF | GTN | 100 | (Belgium) First Motorsport | (Netherlands) Hoevert Vos (Netherlands) Jeroen Schothorst (Netherlands) Raymond Coronel (Netherlands) Harrie Kolen | Porsche 3.6 L Flat-6 | M | 91 |
| 36 DNF | GT3 | 84 | (Germany) Reiter Engineering | (Netherlands) Peter Kox (Germany) Marc Hayek (Italy) Ettore Bonaldi (Taiwan) Jeffrey Lee | Lamborghini Gallardo LP560 GT3 | M | 63 |
| 36 DNF | GT3 | 84 | (Germany) Reiter Engineering | (Netherlands) Peter Kox (Germany) Marc Hayek (Italy) Ettore Bonaldi (Taiwan) Jeffrey Lee | Lamborghini 5.2 L V10 | M | 63 |
| 37 DNF | GT3 | 72 | (Belgium) WRT Belgian Audi Club | (Germany) Frank Biela (Germany) Frank Stippler (Belgium) Vincent Vosse (Belgium) Grégory Franchi | Audi R8 LMS | M | 57 |
| 37 DNF | GT3 | 72 | (Belgium) WRT Belgian Audi Club | (Germany) Frank Biela (Germany) Frank Stippler (Belgium) Vincent Vosse (Belgium) Grégory Franchi | Audi 5.2 L V10 | M | 57 |
| 38 DNF | GT3 | 61 | (Belgium) Prospeed Competition | (France) Philippe Nozière (France) Remy Brouard (Belgium) Christophe Kerkhove | Porsche 997 GT3-R | M | 43 |
| 38 DNF | GT3 | 61 | (Belgium) Prospeed Competition | (France) Philippe Nozière (France) Remy Brouard (Belgium) Christophe Kerkhove | Porsche 4.0 L Flat-6 | M | 43 |
| 39 DNF | GT3 | 63 | (Belgium) Brussels Racing | (Belgium) Pierre Grivegnée (Belgium) Christophe D'Ansembourg (France) Jérôme Demay | Aston Martin DBRS9 | M | 25 |
| 39 DNF | GT3 | 63 | (Belgium) Brussels Racing | (Belgium) Pierre Grivegnée (Belgium) Christophe D'Ansembourg (France) Jérôme Demay | Aston Martin 6.0 L V12 | M | 25 |
| 40 DNF | GT4 | 62 | (United Kingdom) RJN Motorsport | (United Kingdom) Rob Barff (United Kingdom) Alex Buncombe (United Kingdom) Chris Buncombe (Spain) Lucas Ordoñez | Nissan 370Z GT4 | M | 23 |
| 40 DNF | GT4 | 62 | (United Kingdom) RJN Motorsport | (United Kingdom) Rob Barff (United Kingdom) Alex Buncombe (United Kingdom) Chris Buncombe (Spain) Lucas Ordoñez | Nissan 3.8 L V6 | M | 23 |
| DNS | GTN | 92 | (Switzerland) G2 Racing | (Germany) Björn Grossmann (Switzerland) Claudio Sdanewitsch (France) Stéphane Clareton (France) Cédric Mézard | Ferrari F430 GT3 | M | – |
| DNS | GTN | 92 | (Switzerland) G2 Racing | (Germany) Björn Grossmann (Switzerland) Claudio Sdanewitsch (France) Stéphane Clareton (France) Cédric Mézard | Ferrari 4.3 L V8 | M | – |
