= 2021 Gulf 12 Hours =

10th Gulf 12 Hours endurance race

Race details
Date	9 January 2021
Official name	Gulf 12 Hours
Location	Sakhir, Bahrain
Course	Permanent circuit 5.412 km (3.363 mi)
Distance	Race; 12 hours
- Qualifying

Pole
Driver	(United Kingdom) Ben Barnicoat	2 Seas Motorsport
Time	1:59.716
- Race After 6 Hours

Fastest lap
Driver	(United Kingdom) Ben Barnicoat	2 Seas Motorsport
Time	2:00.675 (on lap 2)

Podium
First	(Bahrain) Isa Al-Khalifa (United Kingdom) Ben Barnicoat (Croatia) Martin Kodrić	2 Seas Motorsport
Second	(United Kingdom) Chris Froggatt (United Kingdom) Ian Loggie (United Kingdom) Callum MacLeod	Ram Racing
Third	(Italy) Mauro Calamia (Switzerland) Stefano Monaco (Italy) Roberto Pampanini	Dinamic Motorsport
- Race After 12 Hours

Fastest lap
Driver	(Croatia) Martin Kodrić	2 Seas Motorsport
Time	2:00.882 (on lap 110)

Podium
First	(Bahrain) Isa Al-Khalifa (United Kingdom) Ben Barnicoat (Croatia) Martin Kodrić	2 Seas Motorsport
Second	(Italy) Mauro Calamia (Switzerland) Stefano Monaco (Italy) Roberto Pampanini	Dinamic Motorsport
Third	(United Kingdom) Chris Froggatt (United Kingdom) Ian Loggie (United Kingdom) Callum MacLeod	Ram Racing

The 2021 Gulf 12 Hours was the tenth edition of the Gulf 12 Hours held at Bahrain International Circuit on 9 January 2021. The race was contested with GT3-spec cars and GT4-spec cars. The event promoters were the Driving Force Events (DFE). The event had been relocated from Abu Dhabi's Yas Marina Circuit to Bahrain International Circuit and postponed from 2020.

== Entry list ==
GT3
Team	Car	Engine	No.	Drivers	Class
(United Kingdom) Ram Racing	Mercedes-AMG GT3 Evo	Mercedes-AMG M159 6.2 L V8	3	(United Kingdom) Chris Froggatt	PA
(United Kingdom) Ram Racing	Mercedes-AMG GT3 Evo	Mercedes-AMG M159 6.2 L V8	3	(United Kingdom) Ian Loggie	PA
(United Kingdom) Ram Racing	Mercedes-AMG GT3 Evo	Mercedes-AMG M159 6.2 L V8	3	(United Kingdom) Callum MacLeod	PA
(Bahrain) 2 Seas Motorsport	McLaren 720S GT3	McLaren M840T 4.0 L Turbo V8	7	(United Arab Emirates) Ed Jones	P
(Bahrain) 2 Seas Motorsport	McLaren 720S GT3	McLaren M840T 4.0 L Turbo V8	7	(Luxembourg) Dylan Pereira	P
(Bahrain) 2 Seas Motorsport	McLaren 720S GT3	McLaren M840T 4.0 L Turbo V8	7	(United Kingdom) Lewis Williamson	P
(Bahrain) 2 Seas Motorsport	McLaren 720S GT3	McLaren M840T 4.0 L Turbo V8	33	(Bahrain) Isa Al-Khalifa	P
(Bahrain) 2 Seas Motorsport	McLaren 720S GT3	McLaren M840T 4.0 L Turbo V8	33	(United Kingdom) Ben Barnicoat	P
(Bahrain) 2 Seas Motorsport	McLaren 720S GT3	McLaren M840T 4.0 L Turbo V8	33	(Croatia) Martin Kodrić	P
(Switzerland) Kessel Racing	Ferrari 488 GT3	Ferrari 3.9 L Twin-Turbo V8	8	(Italy) Alessandro Cutrera	PA
(Switzerland) Kessel Racing	Ferrari 488 GT3	Ferrari 3.9 L Twin-Turbo V8	8	(Italy) Marco Frezza	PA
(Switzerland) Kessel Racing	Ferrari 488 GT3	Ferrari 3.9 L Twin-Turbo V8	8	(Italy) LMDV	PA
(Switzerland) Kessel Racing	Ferrari 488 GT3	Ferrari 3.9 L Twin-Turbo V8	8	(Italy) Nicola Cadei	PA
(Switzerland) Kessel Racing	Ferrari 488 GT3	Ferrari 3.9 L Twin-Turbo V8	27	(Turkey) Murat Cuhadaroglu	G
(Switzerland) Kessel Racing	Ferrari 488 GT3	Ferrari 3.9 L Twin-Turbo V8	27	(Italy) David Fumanelli	G
(Switzerland) Kessel Racing	Ferrari 488 GT3	Ferrari 3.9 L Twin-Turbo V8	27	(Italy) Emanuele Tabacchi	G
(Switzerland) Kessel Racing	Ferrari 488 GT3	Ferrari 3.9 L Twin-Turbo V8	27	(Italy) Francesco Zollo	G
(Italy) Monster VR46 Kessel Racing	Ferrari 488 GT3	Ferrari 3.9 L Twin-Turbo V8	46	(Italy) Luca Marini	PA
(Italy) Monster VR46 Kessel Racing	Ferrari 488 GT3	Ferrari 3.9 L Twin-Turbo V8	46	(Italy) Valentino Rossi	PA
(Italy) Monster VR46 Kessel Racing	Ferrari 488 GT3	Ferrari 3.9 L Twin-Turbo V8	46	(Italy) Alessio Salucci	PA
(United Kingdom) Team Parker Racing	Bentley Continental GT3	Bentley 4.0 L Turbo V8	31	(United Kingdom) Euan McKay	PA
(United Kingdom) Team Parker Racing	Bentley Continental GT3	Bentley 4.0 L Turbo V8	31	(United Kingdom) Andy Meyrick	PA
(United Kingdom) Team Parker Racing	Bentley Continental GT3	Bentley 4.0 L Turbo V8	31	(United Kingdom) Derek Pierce	PA
(Italy) Dinamic Motorsport	Porsche 911 GT3 R	Porsche 4.0 L Flat-6	67	(Italy) Mauro Calamia	PA
(Italy) Dinamic Motorsport	Porsche 911 GT3 R	Porsche 4.0 L Flat-6	67	(Switzerland) Stefano Monaco	PA
(Italy) Dinamic Motorsport	Porsche 911 GT3 R	Porsche 4.0 L Flat-6	67	(Italy) Roberto Pampanini	PA
(United Kingdom) Inception Racing with Optimum Motorsport	McLaren 720S GT3	McLaren M840T 4.0 L Turbo V8	72	(United States) Brendan Iribe	PA
(United Kingdom) Inception Racing with Optimum Motorsport	McLaren 720S GT3	McLaren M840T 4.0 L Turbo V8	72	(United Kingdom) Ollie Millroy	PA
(United Kingdom) Inception Racing with Optimum Motorsport	McLaren 720S GT3	McLaren M840T 4.0 L Turbo V8	72	(United Kingdom) Nick Moss	PA
(United Kingdom) Inception Racing with Optimum Motorsport	McLaren 720S GT3	McLaren M840T 4.0 L Turbo V8	72	(United Kingdom) Joe Osborne	PA
GT4
Team	Car	Engine	No.	Drivers	Class
(Spain) SVC Sport Management	Maserati GranTurismo MC GT4	Maserati 4.7 L V8	50	(Poland) Antoni Chodzen	GT4
(Spain) SVC Sport Management	Maserati GranTurismo MC GT4	Maserati 4.7 L V8	50	(Poland) Piotr Chodzen	GT4
(Spain) SVC Sport Management	Maserati GranTurismo MC GT4	Maserati 4.7 L V8	50	(Italy) Patrick Zamparini	GT4
(United Kingdom) Optimum Motorsport	McLaren 570S GT4	McLaren 3.8 L Turbo V8	77	(Germany) Lars Dahmann	GT4
(United Kingdom) Optimum Motorsport	McLaren 570S GT4	McLaren 3.8 L Turbo V8	77	(United Kingdom) Warren Hughes	GT4
(United Kingdom) Optimum Motorsport	McLaren 570S GT4	McLaren 3.8 L Turbo V8	77	(United Kingdom) Charlie Hollings	GT4
(United Kingdom) Optimum Motorsport	McLaren 570S GT4	McLaren 3.8 L Turbo V8	77	(Germany) Jan Klingelnberg	GT4
(Italy) Villorba Corse	Mercedes-AMG GT4	Mercedes-AMG M159 6.2 L V8	90	(Switzerland) Jean-Luc D‘Auria	GT4
(Italy) Villorba Corse	Mercedes-AMG GT4	Mercedes-AMG M159 6.2 L V8	90	(Italy) Michele Camarlinghi	GT4
(Italy) Villorba Corse	Mercedes-AMG GT4	Mercedes-AMG M159 6.2 L V8	90	(Italy) Piero Randazzo	GT4
(Italy) Villorba Corse	Mercedes-AMG GT4	Mercedes-AMG M159 6.2 L V8	90	(Italy) Benedetto Strignano	GT4

Icon	Class
P	Pro
PA	Pro-Am
G	Gentleman
GT4	GT4 Cars

== Results ==
=== Results after 6 hours ===
Class winners denoted in bold.

Pos	Class	No.	Team / Entrant	Drivers	Chassis	Laps	Time/Retired
Pos	Class	No.	Team / Entrant	Drivers	Engine	Laps	Time/Retired
1	**GT Pro**	**33**	**(Bahrain) 2 Seas Motorsport**	**(Bahrain) Isa Al-Khalifa (United Kingdom) Ben Barnicoat (Croatia) Martin Kodrić**	**McLaren 720S GT3**	**169**	**6:01:09.012**
1	**GT Pro**	**33**	**(Bahrain) 2 Seas Motorsport**	**(Bahrain) Isa Al-Khalifa (United Kingdom) Ben Barnicoat (Croatia) Martin Kodrić**	**McLaren M840T 4.0 L Turbo V8**	**169**	**6:01:09.012**
2	**GT Pro-Am**	**3**	**(United Kingdom) Ram Racing**	**(United Kingdom) Chris Froggatt (United Kingdom) Ian Loggie (United Kingdom) Callum MacLeod**	**Mercedes-AMG GT3 Evo**	**169**	**+29.568**
2	**GT Pro-Am**	**3**	**(United Kingdom) Ram Racing**	**(United Kingdom) Chris Froggatt (United Kingdom) Ian Loggie (United Kingdom) Callum MacLeod**	**Mercedes-AMG M159 6.2 L V8**	**169**	**+29.568**
3	GT Pro-Am	67	(Italy) Dinamic Motorsport	(Italy) Mauro Calamia (Switzerland) Stefano Monaco (Italy) Roberto Pampanini	Porsche 911 GT3 R	169	+55.273
3	GT Pro-Am	67	(Italy) Dinamic Motorsport	(Italy) Mauro Calamia (Switzerland) Stefano Monaco (Italy) Roberto Pampanini	Porsche 4.0 L Flat-6	169	+55.273
4	GT Pro-Am	31	(United Kingdom) Team Parker Racing	(United Kingdom) Euan McKay (United Kingdom) Andy Meyrick (United Kingdom) Derek Pierce	Bentley Continental GT3	169	+58.882
4	GT Pro-Am	31	(United Kingdom) Team Parker Racing	(United Kingdom) Euan McKay (United Kingdom) Andy Meyrick (United Kingdom) Derek Pierce	Bentley 4.0 L Turbo V8	169	+58.882
5	GT Pro-Am	46	(Italy) Monster VR46 Kessel Racing	(Italy) Luca Marini (Italy) Valentino Rossi (Italy) Alessio Salucci	Ferrari 488 GT3	168	+1 lap
5	GT Pro-Am	46	(Italy) Monster VR46 Kessel Racing	(Italy) Luca Marini (Italy) Valentino Rossi (Italy) Alessio Salucci	Ferrari 3.9 L Twin-Turbo V8	168	+1 lap
6	**GT Gentleman**	**27**	**(Switzerland) Kessel Racing**	**(Turkey) Murat Cuhadaroglu (Italy) David Fumanelli (Italy) Emanuele Tabacchi (Italy) Francesco Zollo**	**Ferrari 488 GT3**	**168**	**+1 lap**
6	**GT Gentleman**	**27**	**(Switzerland) Kessel Racing**	**(Turkey) Murat Cuhadaroglu (Italy) David Fumanelli (Italy) Emanuele Tabacchi (Italy) Francesco Zollo**	**Ferrari 3.9 L Twin-Turbo V8**	**168**	**+1 lap**
7	GT Pro-Am	8	(Switzerland) Kessel Racing	(Italy) Alessandro Cutrera (Italy) Marco Frezza (Italy) Leonardo-Maria del Vecchio (Italy) Nicola Cadei	Ferrari 488 GT3	161	+7 laps
7	GT Pro-Am	8	(Switzerland) Kessel Racing	(Italy) Alessandro Cutrera (Italy) Marco Frezza (Italy) Leonardo-Maria del Vecchio (Italy) Nicola Cadei	Ferrari 3.9 L Twin-Turbo V8	161	+7 laps
8	**GT4**	**77**	**(United Kingdom) Optimum Motorsport**	**(Germany) Lars Dahmann (United Kingdom) Warren Hughes (United Kingdom) Charlie Hollings (Germany) Jan Klingelnberg**	**McLaren 570S GT4**	**153**	**+15 laps**
8	**GT4**	**77**	**(United Kingdom) Optimum Motorsport**	**(Germany) Lars Dahmann (United Kingdom) Warren Hughes (United Kingdom) Charlie Hollings (Germany) Jan Klingelnberg**	**McLaren 3.8 L Turbo V8**	**153**	**+15 laps**
9	GT4	90	(Italy) Villorba Corse	(Switzerland) Jean-Luc D‘Auria (Italy) Michele Camarlinghi (Italy) Piero Randazzo (Italy) Benedetto Strignano	Mercedes-AMG GT4	153	+15 laps
9	GT4	90	(Italy) Villorba Corse	(Switzerland) Jean-Luc D‘Auria (Italy) Michele Camarlinghi (Italy) Piero Randazzo (Italy) Benedetto Strignano	Mercedes-AMG M159 6.2 L V8	153	+15 laps
10	GT4	50	(Spain) SVC Sport Management	(Poland) Antoni Chodzen (Poland) Piotr Chodzen (Italy) Patrick Zamparini	Maserati GranTurismo MC GT4	140	+28 laps
10	GT4	50	(Spain) SVC Sport Management	(Poland) Antoni Chodzen (Poland) Piotr Chodzen (Italy) Patrick Zamparini	Maserati 4.7 L V8	140	+28 laps
11	GT Pro-Am	72	(United Kingdom) Inception Racing with Optimum Motorsport	(United States) Brendan Iribe (United Kingdom) Ollie Millroy (United Kingdom) Nick Moss (United Kingdom) Joe Osborne	McLaren 720S GT3	75	Did not finish
11	GT Pro-Am	72	(United Kingdom) Inception Racing with Optimum Motorsport	(United States) Brendan Iribe (United Kingdom) Ollie Millroy (United Kingdom) Nick Moss (United Kingdom) Joe Osborne	McLaren M840T 4.0 L Turbo V8	75	Did not finish
12	GT Pro	7	(Bahrain) 2 Seas Motorsport	(United Arab Emirates) Ed Jones (Luxembourg) Dylan Pereira (United Kingdom) Lewis Williamson	McLaren 720S GT3	26	Did not finish
12	GT Pro	7	(Bahrain) 2 Seas Motorsport	(United Arab Emirates) Ed Jones (Luxembourg) Dylan Pereira (United Kingdom) Lewis Williamson	McLaren M840T 4.0 L Turbo V8	26	Did not finish

=== Final results ===
Class winners denoted in bold.

Pos	Class	No.	Team / Entrant	Drivers	Chassis	Laps	Time/Retired
Pos	Class	No.	Team / Entrant	Drivers	Engine	Laps	Time/Retired
1	**GT Pro**	**33**	**(Bahrain) 2 Seas Motorsport**	**(Bahrain) Isa Al-Khalifa (United Kingdom) Ben Barnicoat (Croatia) Martin Kodrić**	**McLaren 720S GT3**	**341**	**6:00:34.143**
1	**GT Pro**	**33**	**(Bahrain) 2 Seas Motorsport**	**(Bahrain) Isa Al-Khalifa (United Kingdom) Ben Barnicoat (Croatia) Martin Kodrić**	**McLaren M840T 4.0 L Turbo V8**	**341**	**6:00:34.143**
2	**GT Pro-Am**	**67**	**(Italy) Dinamic Motorsport**	**(Italy) Mauro Calamia (Switzerland) Stefano Monaco (Italy) Roberto Pampanini**	**Porsche 911 GT3 R**	**340**	**+1 lap**
2	**GT Pro-Am**	**67**	**(Italy) Dinamic Motorsport**	**(Italy) Mauro Calamia (Switzerland) Stefano Monaco (Italy) Roberto Pampanini**	**Porsche 4.0 L Flat-6**	**340**	**+1 lap**
3	GT Pro-Am	3	(United Kingdom) Ram Racing	(United Kingdom) Chris Froggatt (United Kingdom) Ian Loggie (United Kingdom) Callum MacLeod	Mercedes-AMG GT3 Evo	339	+2 laps
3	GT Pro-Am	3	(United Kingdom) Ram Racing	(United Kingdom) Chris Froggatt (United Kingdom) Ian Loggie (United Kingdom) Callum MacLeod	Mercedes-AMG M159 6.2 L V8	339	+2 laps
4	GT Pro-Am	46	(Italy) Monster VR46 Kessel Racing	(Italy) Luca Marini (Italy) Valentino Rossi (Italy) Alessio Salucci	Ferrari 488 GT3	339	+2 laps
4	GT Pro-Am	46	(Italy) Monster VR46 Kessel Racing	(Italy) Luca Marini (Italy) Valentino Rossi (Italy) Alessio Salucci	Ferrari 3.9 L Twin-Turbo V8	339	+2 laps
5	GT Pro-Am	31	(United Kingdom) Team Parker Racing	(United Kingdom) Euan McKay (United Kingdom) Andy Meyrick (United Kingdom) Derek Pierce	Bentley Continental GT3	338	+3 laps
5	GT Pro-Am	31	(United Kingdom) Team Parker Racing	(United Kingdom) Euan McKay (United Kingdom) Andy Meyrick (United Kingdom) Derek Pierce	Bentley 4.0 L Turbo V8	338	+3 laps
6	**GT Gentleman**	**27**	**(Switzerland) Kessel Racing**	**(Turkey) Murat Cuhadaroglu (Italy) David Fumanelli (Italy) Emanuele Tabacchi (Italy) Francesco Zollo**	**Ferrari 488 GT3**	**337**	**+4 laps**
6	**GT Gentleman**	**27**	**(Switzerland) Kessel Racing**	**(Turkey) Murat Cuhadaroglu (Italy) David Fumanelli (Italy) Emanuele Tabacchi (Italy) Francesco Zollo**	**Ferrari 3.9 L Twin-Turbo V8**	**337**	**+4 laps**
7	GT Pro-Am	8	(Switzerland) Kessel Racing	(Italy) Alessandro Cutrera (Italy) Marco Frezza (Italy) Leonardo-Maria del Vecchio (Italy) Nicola Cadei	Ferrari 488 GT3	325	+16 laps
7	GT Pro-Am	8	(Switzerland) Kessel Racing	(Italy) Alessandro Cutrera (Italy) Marco Frezza (Italy) Leonardo-Maria del Vecchio (Italy) Nicola Cadei	Ferrari 3.9 L Twin-Turbo V8	325	+16 laps
8	**GT4**	**90**	**(Italy) Villorba Corse**	**(Switzerland) Jean-Luc D‘Auria (Italy) Michele Camarlinghi (Italy) Piero Randazzo (Italy) Benedetto Strignano**	**Mercedes-AMG GT4**	**307**	**+34 laps**
8	**GT4**	**90**	**(Italy) Villorba Corse**	**(Switzerland) Jean-Luc D‘Auria (Italy) Michele Camarlinghi (Italy) Piero Randazzo (Italy) Benedetto Strignano**	**Mercedes-AMG M159 6.2 L V8**	**307**	**+34 laps**
9	GT4	50	(Spain) SVC Sport Management	(Poland) Antoni Chodzen (Poland) Piotr Chodzen (Italy) Patrick Zamparini	Maserati GranTurismo MC GT4	291	+50 laps
9	GT4	50	(Spain) SVC Sport Management	(Poland) Antoni Chodzen (Poland) Piotr Chodzen (Italy) Patrick Zamparini	Maserati 4.7 L V8	291	+50 laps
10	GT4	77	(United Kingdom) Optimum Motorsport	(Germany) Lars Dahmann (United Kingdom) Warren Hughes (United Kingdom) Charlie Hollings (Germany) Jan Klingelnberg	McLaren 570S GT4	279	+62 laps
10	GT4	77	(United Kingdom) Optimum Motorsport	(Germany) Lars Dahmann (United Kingdom) Warren Hughes (United Kingdom) Charlie Hollings (Germany) Jan Klingelnberg	McLaren 3.8 L Turbo V8	279	+62 laps
11	GT Pro-Am	72	(United Kingdom) Inception Racing with Optimum Motorsport	(United States) Brendan Iribe (United Kingdom) Ollie Millroy (United Kingdom) Nick Moss (United Kingdom) Joe Osborne	McLaren 720S GT3	75	Did not finish
11	GT Pro-Am	72	(United Kingdom) Inception Racing with Optimum Motorsport	(United States) Brendan Iribe (United Kingdom) Ollie Millroy (United Kingdom) Nick Moss (United Kingdom) Joe Osborne	McLaren M840T 4.0 L Turbo V8	75	Did not finish
12	GT Pro	7	(Bahrain) 2 Seas Motorsport	(United Arab Emirates) Ed Jones (Luxembourg) Dylan Pereira (United Kingdom) Lewis Williamson	McLaren 720S GT3	26	Did not finish
12	GT Pro	7	(Bahrain) 2 Seas Motorsport	(United Arab Emirates) Ed Jones (Luxembourg) Dylan Pereira (United Kingdom) Lewis Williamson	McLaren M840T 4.0 L Turbo V8	26	Did not finish
