= Niki Cadei =

Italian racing driver (born 1977)

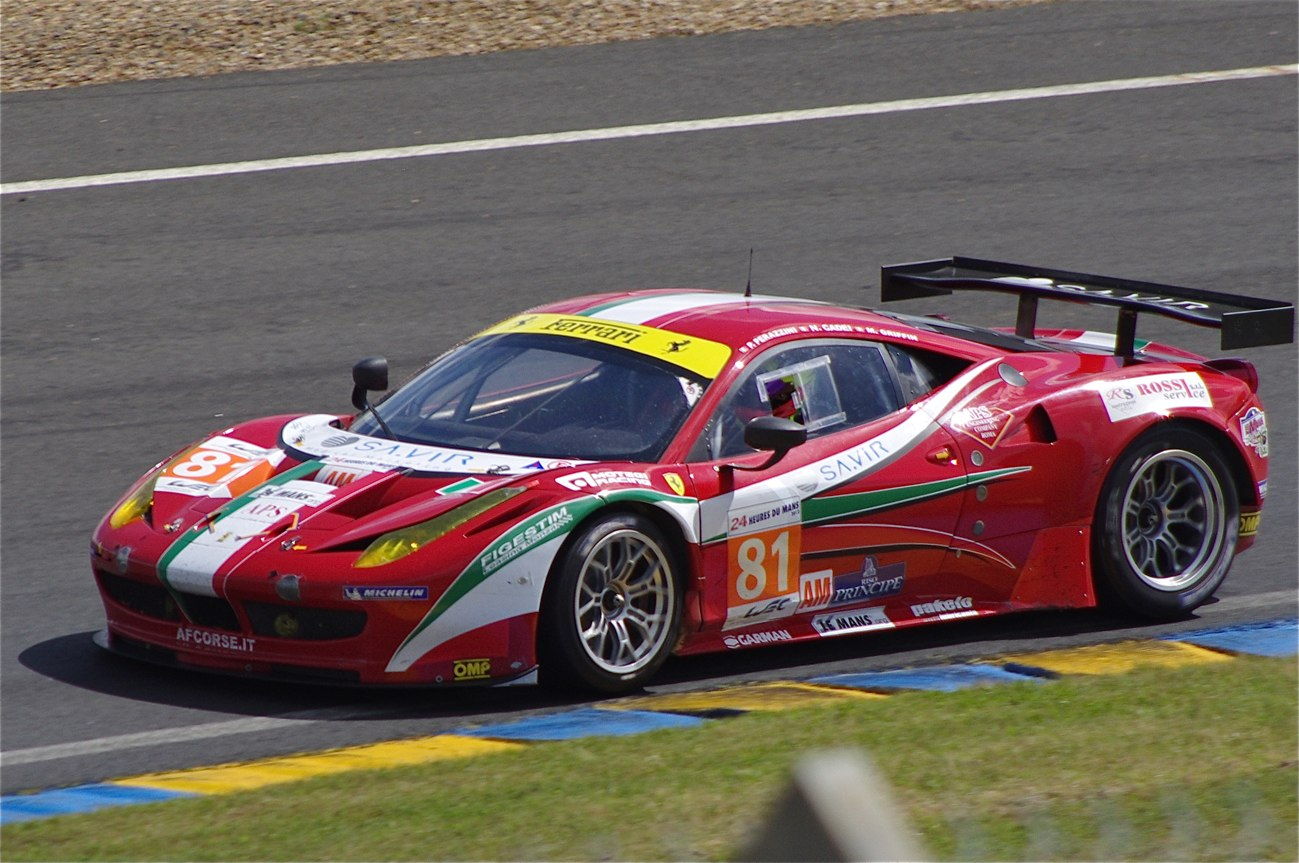
- Cadei in 2012
- Nationality: (Italy) Italian
- Born: 30 October 1977 (age 49) Sarnico, Italy
- Categorisation: FIA Gold (until 2013); FIA Silver (2014–)

Championship titles
- 2011 2008 2004: International GTSprint Series – GT3; Ferrari Challenge Italy – Trofeo Pirelli; Ferrari Challenge World Finals – Trofeo Pirelli

Nicola "Niki" Cadei (born 30 October 1977) is an Italian racing driver who last competed in the 24H Series for Kessel Racing. He is a Ferrari sports car veteran, and an FIA GT and ELMS race winner.

== Career ==
Cadei began competing in single-seaters in 1996, doing so in the Italian Formula Three Championship. In his three seasons in the series, Cadei picked up two wins, as well as a best points finish of fifth in 1997, before progressing to Euro Open by Nissan in 1999. After racing a handful of times in 2000 and spending 2001 on the sidelines, Cadei made the full-time transition to sports cars, by racing in Ferrari Challenge Italy across the next two seasons. Towards the end of 2003, Cadei was set to make his Spa 24 Hours debut in a BMS Scuderia Italia–entered Care Racing Ferrari 550-GTS Maranello, but ultimately did not start the race following a crash in qualifying with Thomas Biagi at the wheel. The following year, Cadei won the Ferrari Challenge World Finals in the Trofeo Pirelli class, before making his FIA GT Championship debut at Zhuhai for BMS Scuderia Italia.

Continuing in Ferrari Challenge competition for 2005, Cadei mainly raced in the Italian series, in which he finished runner-up in the Trofeo Pirelli standings. In 2006, Cadei joined Scuderia Playteam Sarafree to compete in the GT2 class of the Italian GT Championship, taking six wins and finishing on the podium in all but one race to secure a third-place points finish. Returning to Ferrari Challenge Italy for the next two seasons with Rossocorsa, Cadei finished runner-up in Trofeo Pirelli in 2007, before winning the title the following year. During 2008, Cadei also raced part-time for Ferrari-fielding Kessel Racing in the FIA GT3 European Championship, FIA GT Championship and ADAC GT Masters, most notably taking a podium on his debut in the latter at the Nürburgring.

Switching to AF Corse for 2009, Cadei raced a Ferrari F430 GTC in the GT2 class of the FIA GT Championship alongside Álvaro Barba. Starting the season off with a podium at Adria, Cadei then took his only win of the season at Algarve and his third podium of the season at Le Castellet to end the year fourth in points. Remaining with AF Corse for 2010, Cadei switched to the Superstars GTSprint Series alongside Cédric Sbirrazzuoli. After kicking off the season with wins at Monza and Algarve, Cadei then took further victories at the Hockenheimring and Le Castellet to secure runner-up honours in both the overall and GT2 standings. During 2010, Cadei also finished third in the GT2 class of the 24 Hours of Spa in an AF Corse/Vitaphone Racing alliance.

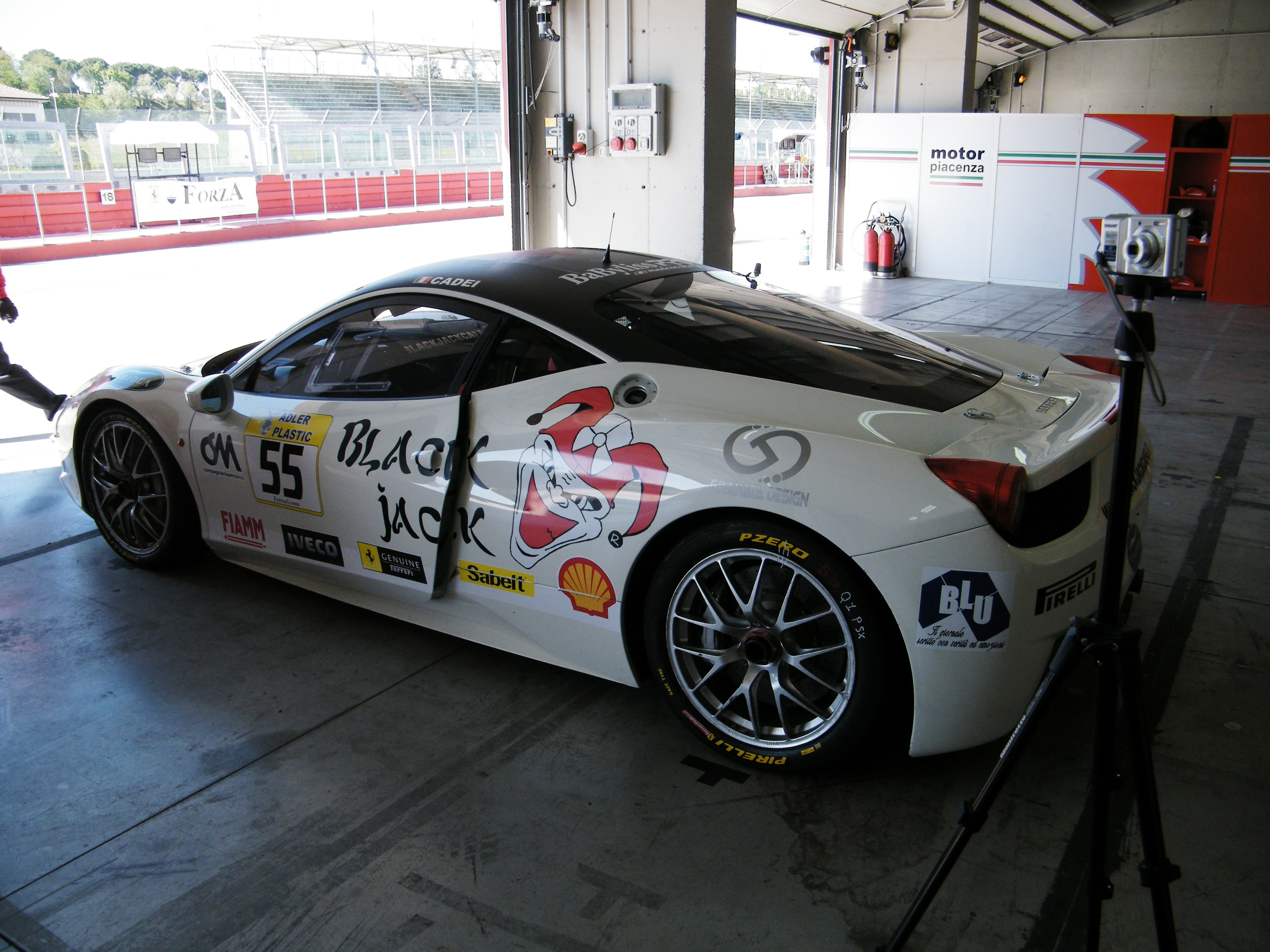
Cadei's Ferrari 458 Challenge at Imola in 2012.

Staying in the newly-rebranded International GTSprint Series for 2011, albeit in the GT3 class, Cadei took overall wins at Valencia and Spa to finish third in the overall points and secure the GT3 title with Fabio Mancini. During 2011, Cadei also finished third in the GT3 Pro-Am class of the 24 Hours of Spa for the same team. The following year, Cadei primarily competed for Motor Piacenza in Ferrari Challenge Europe, taking a lone win at Imola and finishing eighth in the Trofeo Pirelli standings. During 2012, Cadei also joined AF Corse for his 24 Hours of Le Mans debut in LMGTE Am, where he retired after a spectacular crash for Piergiuseppe Perazzini, and took a lone GTS class win in a one-off appearance in International GT Open at Algarve. In 2013, Cadei scaled back his racing programmes, as he raced part-time in the Trofeo Maserati World Series, taking a lone podium at Le Castellet to end the year 12th in points.

After scoring a Gentlemen class podium at the 2015 Gulf 12 Hours for Kessel Racing, Cadei won the 24 Hours of Spa in the Am class with the team in both 2016 and 2017. A GT3 Gent class win then ensued in the 2018 Gulf 12 Hours with Kessel, before making a cameo in the 2019 European Le Mans Series at Silverstone, where he finished third in LMGTE. Continuing with the team through 2020, Cadei raced a Ferrari 488 GTE Evo in select rounds of the European Le Mans Series season, taking a win at Monza en route to a fourth-place points finish. In 2021, Cadei raced for Kessel Racing at the Gulf 12 Hours, as well as the 24H GT Series at Le Castellet.

== Karting record ==
=== Karting career summary ===
| Season | Series | Team | Position |
|---|---|---|---|
| 1992 | Torneo Delle Industrie — 100 Junior | | 16th |
| 1993 | Karting World Cup — Junior A | | 24th |

== Racing record ==
=== Racing career summary ===
| Season | Series | Team | Races | Wins | Poles | F/Laps | Podiums | Points | Position |
|---|---|---|---|---|---|---|---|---|---|
| 1996 | Italian Formula Three Championship | Team Ghinzani | 10 | 0 | 0 | 0 | 0 | 6 | 17th |
| 1997 | Italian Formula Three Championship | Team Ghinzani | 10 | 1 | 0 | 0 | 4 | 80 | 5th |
| 1997 | Monaco Grand Prix Formula Three | Team Ghinzani | 1 | 0 | 0 | 0 | 0 | —N/a | 9th |
| 1997 | Masters of Formula 3 | Team Ghinzani | 1 | 0 | 0 | 0 | 0 | —N/a | 25th |
| 1998 | Italian Formula Three Championship | RC Motorsport | 10 | 1 | 3 | 0 | 2 | 58 | 6th |
| 1999 | Euro Open by Nissan | Auto in Motorsport | 16 | 0 | 0 | 0 | 1 | 38 | 11th |
| 2000 | Renault Clio Trophy Europe | | | | | | | 4 | 30th |
| 2000 | Formula Renault 2000 Italia | Door's Engineering | 1 | 0 | 0 | 0 | 0 | 0 | NC |
| 2002 | Ferrari Challenge Italy – Trofeo Pirelli | | | | | | | | |
| 2003 | Ferrari Challenge Italy – Trofeo Pirelli | | | | | | | | |
| 2003 | FIA GT Championship – GT | Care Racing | 0 | 0 | 0 | 0 | 0 | 0 | NC |
| 2004 | Ferrari Challenge World Finals – Trofeo Pirelli | | | | | | | | **1st** |
| 2004 | FIA GT Championship – GT | BMS Scuderia Italia | 1 | 0 | 0 | 0 | 0 | 0 | NC |
| 2005 | Ferrari Challenge Italy – Trofeo Pirelli | | | | | | | 162 | **2nd** |
| 2005 | Spanish GT Championship – GTA | | | | | | | 14 | 13th |
| 2006 | Italian GT Championship – GT2 | Scuderia Playteam Sarafree | 16 | 6 | 6 | 7 | 15 | 253 | **3rd** |
| 2007 | Ferrari Challenge Italy – Trofeo Pirelli | Rossocorsa | | | | | | 286 | **2nd** |
| 2008 | Ferrari Challenge Italy – Trofeo Pirelli | Rossocorsa | | | | | | 328 | **1st** |
| 2008 | FIA GT3 European Championship | Kessel Racing | 6 | 0 | 0 | 0 | 0 | 11 | 18th |
| 2008 | ADAC GT Masters | Kessel Racing | 2 | 0 | 0 | 0 | 1 | 10 | 22nd |
| 2008 | FIA GT Championship – GT2 | Kessel Racing | 1 | 0 | 0 | 0 | 0 | 1 | 33rd |
| 2009 | FIA GT Championship – GT2 | AF Corse | 8 | 1 | 0 | 0 | 3 | 34 | 4th |
| 2009 | Le Mans Series – GT2 | FBR | 1 | 0 | 0 | 0 | 0 | 3 | 21st |
| 2009 | International GT Open – GTS | Kessel Racing | 2 | 0 | 1 | 1 | 0 | 0 | NC |
| 2010 | Dubai 24 Hour – SP2 | AF Corse | 1 | 0 | 0 | 0 | 0 | —N/a | DNF |
| 2010 | Superstars GTSprint Series – GT2 | AF Corse | 12 | 5 | 2 | 5 | 12 | 202 | **2nd** |
| 2010 | Italian GT Championship – GT2 | AF Corse | 4 | 0 | 0 | 1 | 1 | 22 | 13th |
| 2010 | 24 Hours of Spa – GT2 | AF Corse - ALD Team Vitaphone | 1 | 0 | 0 | 0 | 1 | —N/a | **3rd** |
| 2010 | International GT Open – GTS | Kessel Racing | 4 | 3 | 0 | 0 | 3 | 30 | 9th |
| 2011 | International GTSprint Series | AF Corse | 12 | 2 | 1 | 3 | 7 | 143 | **3rd** |
| 2011 | Blancpain Endurance Series – GT3 Pro-Am | AF Corse | 1 | 0 | 0 | 0 | 1 | 19 | 14th |
| 2011 | International GT Open – GTS | Kessel Racing | 2 | 0 | 1 | 0 | 0 | 4 | 30th |
| 2012 | Dubai 24 Hour – SP2 | AF Corse | 1 | 0 | 0 | 0 | 0 | —N/a | DNF |
| 2012 | International GT Open – GTS | AF Corse | 2 | 1 | 0 | 1 | 2 | 18 | 16th |
| 2012 | FIA World Endurance Championship – LMGTE Am | AF Corse | 1 | 0 | 0 | 0 | 0 | 0 | NC |
| 2012 | 24 Hours of Le Mans – LMGTE Am | AF Corse | 1 | 0 | 0 | 0 | 0 | —N/a | DNF |
| 2012 | Ferrari Challenge Europe – Trofeo Pirelli | Motor Piacenza | 7 | 1 | 2 | 3 | 3 | 91 | 8th |
| 2012 | Blancpain Endurance Series – Pro-Am | MTECH | 1 | 0 | 0 | 0 | 0 | 3 | 36th |
| 2012 | Gulf 12 Hours – GT3 | Kessel Chicco d'oro | 1 | 0 | 0 | 0 | 0 | —N/a | 7th |
| 2013 | Trofeo Maserati World Series | | 5 | 0 | 0 | 0 | 1 | 53 | 12th |
| 2015 | Gulf 12 Hours – Gent | Kessel Racing | 1 | 0 | 0 | 0 | 1 | —N/a | **2nd** |
| 2016 | Blancpain GT Series Endurance Cup – Am | Kessel Racing | 1 | 1 | 1 | 1 | 1 | 47 | 7th |
| 2016 | International GT Open – Pro-Am | Kessel Racing | 2 | 0 | 0 | 0 | 0 | 0 | NC† |
| 2017 | Blancpain GT Series Endurance Cup – Am | Kessel Racing | 1 | 1 | 1 | 0 | 1 | 50 | 7th |
| 2017 | Intercontinental GT Challenge | Kessel Racing | 1 | 0 | 0 | 0 | 0 | 0 | NC |
| 2018 | Gulf 12 Hours – GT3 Gent | Kessel Racing | 1 | 1 | 0 | 0 | 1 | —N/a | **1st** |
| 2019 | European Le Mans Series – LMGTE | Kessel Racing | 1 | 0 | 0 | 0 | 1 | 15 | 16th |
| 2020 | European Le Mans Series – LMGTE | Kessel Racing | 3 | 1 | 1 | 0 | 3 | 62 | 4th |
| 2020 | Le Mans Cup – GT3 | Kessel Racing | 2 | 0 | 0 | 0 | 0 | 13 | 13th |
| 2021 | Gulf 12 Hours – GT Pro-Am | Kessel Racing | 1 | 0 | 0 | 0 | 0 | —N/a | 5th |
| 2021 | 24H GT Series – GT3 Am | Kessel Racing | 1 | 0 | 0 | 0 | 0 | 0 | NC |

^{†} As Cadei was a guest driver, he was ineligible to score points.

=== Complete FIA GT Championship results ===
(key) (Races in bold indicate pole position) (Races in italics indicate fastest lap)

| Year | Team | Car | Class | 1 | 2 | 3 | 4 | 5 | 6 | 7 | 8 | 9 | 10 | 11 | 12 | 13 | Pos. | Pts |
|---|---|---|---|---|---|---|---|---|---|---|---|---|---|---|---|---|---|---|
| 2003 | Care Racing | Ferrari 550-GTS Maranello | GT | CAT | MAG | PER | BRN | DON | SPA; 6H; DNS | SPA; 12H; DNS | SPA; 24H; DNS | AND | OSC | EST | MNZ | | NC | 0 |
| 2004 | BMS Scuderia Italia | Ferrari 550-GTS Maranello | GT | MNZ | VAL | MAG | HOC | BRN | DON | SPA; 6H | SPA; 12H | SPA; 24H | IMO | OSC | DUB | ZHU; 10 | NC | 0 |
| 2008 | Kessel Racing | Ferrari F430 GTC | GT2 | SIL | MNZ | ADR | OSC | SPA; 6H | SPA; 12H | SPA; 24H | BUC; 1 | BUC; 2 | BRN | NOG | ZOL | SAN; 8 | 33rd | 1 |
| 2009 | AF Corse | Ferrari F430 GTC | GT2 | SIL; 5 | ADR; 3 | OSC; 7 | SPA; 6H ? | SPA; 12H ? | SPA; 24H; Ret | BUD; 5 | ALG; 1 | LEC; 3 | ZOL; 7 | | | | 4th | 34 |

=== Complete FIA GT3 European Championship results ===
(key) (Races in bold indicate pole position; races in italics indicate fastest lap)

| Year | Entrant | Chassis | Engine | 1 | 2 | 3 | 4 | 5 | 6 | 7 | 8 | 9 | 10 | 11 | 12 | Pos. | Points |
|---|---|---|---|---|---|---|---|---|---|---|---|---|---|---|---|---|---|
| 2008 | Kessel Racing | Ferrari F430 GT3 | Ferrari F136 4.3 L V8 | SIL; 1; 4 | SIL; 2; 6 | MNZ; 1 | MNZ; 2 | OSC; 1; 20 | OSC; 2; 6 | BRN; 1 Ret | BRN; 2 DNS | NOG; 1 | NOG; 2 | DUB; 1 Ret | DUB; 2 DNS | 18th | 11 |

=== Complete European Le Mans Series results ===
(key) (Races in bold indicate pole position; results in italics indicate fastest lap)

| Year | Entrant | Class | Chassis | Engine | 1 | 2 | 3 | 4 | 5 | 6 | Rank | Points |
|---|---|---|---|---|---|---|---|---|---|---|---|---|
| 2009 | FBR | GT2 | Ferrari F430 GT2 | Ferrari 4.0 L V8 | CAT | SPA | ALG | NUR | SIL; 6 | | 21st | 3 |
| 2019 | Kessel Racing | LMGTE | Ferrari 488 GTE Evo | Ferrari F154CB 3.9 L Turbo V8 | LEC | MNZ | CAT | SIL; 3 | SPA | ALG | 16th | 15 |
| 2020 | Kessel Racing | LMGTE | Ferrari 488 GTE Evo | Ferrari F154CB 3.9 L Turbo V8 | **LEC**; 2 | SPA | LEC | MNZ; 1 | ALG; 2 | | 4th | 62 |

=== Complete GT World Challenge Europe results ===
==== GT World Challenge Europe Endurance Cup ====
(key) (Races in bold indicate pole position) (Races in italics indicate fastest lap)

| Year | Team | Car | Class | 1 | 2 | 3 | 4 | 5 | 6 | 7 | 8 | Pos. | Points |
|---|---|---|---|---|---|---|---|---|---|---|---|---|---|
| 2011 | AF Corse | Ferrari 458 Italia GT3 | Pro-Am | MNZ | NAV | SPA; 6H ? | SPA; 12H ? | SPA; 24H; 9 | MAG | SIL | | 14th | 19 |
| 2012 | MTECH | Ferrari 458 Italia GT3 | Pro-Am | MNZ | SIL | LEC | SPA; 6H ? | SPA; 12H ? | SPA; 24H; Ret | NÜR | NAV | 36th | 3 |
| 2016 | Kessel Racing | Ferrari 458 Italia GT3 | Am | MNZ | SIL | LEC | **SPA**; **6H**; 43 | **SPA**; **12H**; 36 | **SPA**; **24H**; 32 | NÜR | | 7th | 47 |
| 2017 | Kessel Racing | Ferrari 488 GT3 | Am | MNZ | SIL | LEC | **SPA**; **6H**; 29 | SPA; 12H; 26 | SPA; 24H; 22 | CAT | | 7th | 50 |

=== Complete 24 Hours of Le Mans results ===
| Year | Team | Co-Drivers | Car | Class | Laps | Pos. | Class Pos. |
|---|---|---|---|---|---|---|---|
| 2012 | (Italy) AF Corse | (Republic of Ireland) Matt Griffin (Italy) Piergiuseppe Perazzini | Ferrari 458 Italia GT2 | LMGTE Am | 70 | DNF | DNF |
