= Mario Ferraris =

Italian racing driver

- Nationality: Italian
- Born: 4 January 1968 (age 58) Vaprio d'Adda, Italy

TCR International Series career
- Debut season: 2016
- Current team: Mulsanne Racing
- Car number: 20
- Starts: 2

Previous series
- 2014 2012 2010 2009, 15 2008-09 2008-10 1996: Zhuhai Pan Delta Series; Peugeot RCZ Racing Cup; Superstars GTSprint Series; Campionato Italiano Turismo Endurance; International GT Open; Italian GT Championship; Italian Historical Car Championship

Championship titles
- 2014 2012 2009 1996: Zhuhai Pan Delta Series; Peugeot RCZ Racing Cup; Italian GT Championship; Italian Historical Car Championship, Class 1300

Mario Ferraris (born 4 January 1968) is an Italian racing driver currently competing in the TCR International Series. Having previously competed in the Superstars GTSprint Series, Campionato Italiano Turismo Endurance and International GT Open amongst others.

== Racing career ==
Ferraris started racing in 1996. He raced an Alfa Romeo Giulietta in the Italian Historical Car Championship winning the 1300 class title that year. Following a hiatus, he switched to the Italian GT Championship for 2008 finishing seventh in the standings that year. He stayed in the series up until 2010, winning the championship in 2009. He also raced in the International GT Open from 2008-2009. In 2009 he switched to the Campionato Italiano Turismo Endurance, he returned to the series in 2015. In 2010 he raced in the Superstars GTSprint Series, he only took part in three races that season, as he also raced in the Italian GT that year. He switched to the Peugeot RCZ Racing Cup for 2012, winning the championship that year. In 2014 he raced his Mercedes C63 AMG in the Zhuhai Pan Delta Series, winning the title that year.

In September 2016 it was announced that he would race in the TCR International Series, driving an Alfa Romeo Giulietta TCR for Mulsanne Racing.

== Racing record ==
=== Complete TCR International Series results ===
(key) (Races in bold indicate pole position) (Races in italics indicate fastest lap)

| Year | Team | Car | 1 | 2 | 3 | 4 | 5 | 6 | 7 | 8 | 9 | 10 | 11 | 12 | 13 | 14 | 15 | 16 | 17 | 18 | 19 | 20 | 21 | 22 | DC | Points |
|---|---|---|---|---|---|---|---|---|---|---|---|---|---|---|---|---|---|---|---|---|---|---|---|---|---|---|
| 2016 | Mulsanne Racing | Alfa Romeo Giulietta TCR | BHR; 1 | BHR; 2 | POR; 1 | POR; 2 | BEL; 1 | BEL; 2 | ITA; 1 | ITA; 2 | AUT; 1 | AUT; 2 | GER; 1 | GER; 2 | RUS; 1 | RUS; 2 | THA; 1 | THA; 2 | SIN; 1 | SIN; 2 | MYS; 1 Ret | MYS; 2; 14 | MAC; 1 | MAC; 2 | NC | 0 |
