= Race Team Alliance =

American business organization

- Formation: July 7, 2014
- Headquarters: Charlotte, North Carolina
- Executive director: Jonathan Marshall
- Chairman: Vacant (Rob Kauffman announced plans to step down in April 2026; a successor had not yet been named)
- Website: www.raceteamalliance.com

The Race Team Alliance (RTA) is a 501(c)(6) organization based in Charlotte, North Carolina, founded by businessman and former NASCAR team stakeholder Rob Kauffman. The organization currently consists of 15 NASCAR Cup Series teams and is led by Jonathan Marshall. Chairman Rob Kauffman announced in April 2026 that he was planning to step down from his chairmanship, with a successor not yet named at that time. The organization negotiates with NASCAR on major topics within the league on behalf of NASCAR race teams in said topics, including the implementation of the charter system and negotiating media rights deals. The organization within recent years has also overseen expansion, including the purchase of a motorsports news site along with a now-defunct NASCAR esports league.

The RTA has seen mixed reception throughout the NASCAR landscape; particularly for its influence in creating the charter system and the system's consequences within NASCAR. In recent years, while the system has received praise from some drivers and larger race teams for providing teams with needed tangible assets, the system has also seen mounting criticism from other smaller, independent teams who claim that the system drives out smaller teams, stunting the growth of smaller teams while also favoring larger teams. The organization has also seen criticism from NASCAR businessmen, including Brian France and Bruton Smith, deeming the organization as unnecessary.

== History ==
=== Beginnings ===
On July 7, 2014, the Race Team Alliance (RTA) was officially announced by then-Michael Waltrip Racing stakeholder Rob Kauffman. At the time of the initial announcement, the RTA had nine teams, with the RTA being formed to negotiate with NASCAR to increase the value and cut costs on behalf of NASCAR teams. Immediately afterwards, the organization came under scrutiny from NASCAR businessmen, including Bruton Smith and Brian France, who found it to be unnecessary and thought that NASCAR was sufficiently supporting them regardless. However, by August, the RTA expanded to include every full-time team with the exception of Furniture Row Racing. By 2015, Kauffman declared that his objectives were "overplayed", instead comparing the RTA to being in "kind of in the background and there's not much to talk about" despite possibilities of the RTA negotiating with NASCAR for increased financial aid. Within the same year, the RTA also partnered with DraftKings and Rev the Vote to expand marketing deals. By July, Kauffman stated that negotiations with NASCAR had "gone very well so far", praising an uptick in communication between the two organizations.

=== Implementation of the charter system ===
In 2015, Hendrick Motorsports owner Rick Hendrick stated that negotiations with NASCAR to "create some sort of permanent value for the teams" were occurring in response to a phenomenon where if a team shut down, the owners would most likely go into debt as they could not sell off their equipment for their proper worth. By December, the RTA and NASCAR COO Brent Dewar were "cautiously optimistic" that a franchising deal that would guarantee an unspecified number of starting spots per race along with some of the television revenue from media rights deals would be made. The next month, Kauffman reported that the two sides were nearing an official deal.

On February 9, 2016, a week before the 2016 Daytona 500, the RTA and NASCAR announced the implementation of the charter system, which sought to cut costs and increase profits for teams. With the system, a 36 charters were allotted to teams; this would guarantee them a starting spot in every race along with increased purse money for chartered teams. In addition, the NASCAR Cup Series field was limited to 40 cars and a team owner's council was formed. Teams also had the opportunity to sell or lease (only for a year) their charters. Three days later, Wood Brothers Racing left the organization as they did not receive a charter. In later years, in response to open teams entering races, Kauffman defended the charter system, claiming that part-time teams devalued the worth of a NASCAR race team and that only chartered teams should enter races. NASCAR later implemented a rule reserving their right to repossess charters belonging to teams finishing in the bottom three of owner points for three seasons in a row at NASCAR's discretion; although, as of 2023, no teams have lost a charter that way. Teams may also possess no more than four charters per NASCAR's four car limit in the Cup Series; in 2025, the number of allowed charters per team was reduced to three, with Hendrick Motorsports and Joe Gibbs Racing being grandfathered in and chartered teams being allowed to run an open fourth car (such as in the case of Trackhouse Racing's Project91 cars).

=== Business expansion ===
In January 2018, Sports Business Journal's Adam Stern reported that the RTA and NASCAR were collaborating on creating an esports league on iRacing, an online racing simulation video game. By the end of the year, the esports league was officially announced; although, the league took place on NASCAR Heat 3. Within 2018, the RTA also appointed Jonathan Marshall to run the organization. In October 2019, the RTA purchased Speed51, a motorsport news site that primarily covers short track races. The acquisition saw mixed reception; in an analysis from reporters from fellow motorsports news site Frontstretch, some thought the purchase could expand the marketing potential of NASCAR teams, while others thought it would suppress opinions that NASCAR teams did not agree with. In 2021, the RTA rebranded Speed51 to become Racing America, along with promises of expanded content from NASCAR teams on Racing America.

=== Disputes with NASCAR, fears of league-splitting ===
In October 2022, the RTA went public with their thoughts on equitable revenue distribution within NASCAR, declaring that they thought current economic model that NASCAR was using had "little to no chance of long-term stability". Under the economic model, the $8.2 billion, 10-year media deal signed in 2015 allotted 65% of the deal to tracks, 25% to teams, and 10% to NASCAR. The RTA declared that while they would honor the current deal, in the next media deal that was to be made in 2024, they demanded more revenue to "cover baseline costs". The next month, the RTA stated that they were exploring the idea of holding exhibition events that were not sanctioned by NASCAR in response to "struggling to turn a profit... thus forcing them to investigate other sources of revenue". Despite a clause in the current deal prohibiting it, the exploration of the idea led to fears of a potential split similar to American open-wheel car racing between Championship Auto Racing Teams (CART) and the Indy Racing League (IRL) that occurred in the late 1990s.

By April 2023, the RTA and its members were boycotting quarterly meetings with NASCAR, stating further displeasure with the revenue sharing system. However, by the next month, the teams backtracked and requested "meaningful dialog", wanting permanent charters instead of requiring charter renewal along with previously stated economic concerns. Part-stakeholder in 23XI Racing, Denny Hamlin, declared that making charters permanent would protect investors and give "security" to their investments to a team. By February 2024, the RTA hired an antitrust lawyer, along with Hendrick Motorsports' vice chairman Jeff Gordon claiming that the team, despite being one of the most successful, had not made a profit within the last decade. In October, 23XI Racing and Front Row Motorsports, who declined to sign the 2025 charter agreement, filed a lawsuit against NASCAR on antitrust grounds regarding the charter system. On December 18, a judge granted a preliminary injunction that ensured both 23XI Racing and Front Row Motorsports would continue to compete as chartered teams in 2025. The injunction was overturned on June 5, 2025, meaning both teams lost their chartered status for the period of the lawsuit. As a result of the proceedings process, the 2025 charter agreement became public in October 2025.

=== New era of charters ===
On December 11, 2025 the Lawsuit between 23XI/FRM and NASCAR ended with a settlement. In that settlement, charters became permanent, and the "three-strike rule" that was originally removed from the 2025 charter agreement got reinserted and expanded to five strikes.

== Critical reception ==
Immediately after the organization was formed, it faced criticism from leaders and businessmen within the NASCAR landscape; particularly to fears of the RTA stunting NASCAR's growth. Three days after the organization was announced, Speedway Motorsports, Inc. (SMI) founder Bruton Smith heavily criticized both the organization and its founder Rob Kauffman, stating that NASCAR had already been supporting the teams sufficiently, declaring that he did not "know anything about it that's good for what we do. I don't see anything that's going to be good for the sport. Nothing." Ten days later, the organization saw further criticism from then-NASCAR CEO Brian France, with him declaring that listening to one combined organization instead of hearing organizations separately "would probably be the worst thing we could ever do", calling the organization "unnecessary". In 2018, in statements given on NASCAR Race Hub, former NASCAR crew chief Larry McReynolds stated his belief that the RTA was "chasing something that I'm not sure we're chasing", believing its existence was not "the healthiest thing for the sport".

The RTA during its formation saw defense from longtime NASCAR personality and team owner Richard Petty, whose team was in the RTA. In interviews, Petty claimed that the RTA only wanted to spur the growth of NASCAR, claiming that "anything we do to tear NASCAR down is cutting our own throats". NASCAR's president at the time, Mike Helton, later released a press statement on behalf of NASCAR in July 2014, declaring that the RTA did not pose a threat to NASCAR. Helton later reaffirmed this position in February 2015, stating that while NASCAR preferred to talk to each owner individually, he had "respect for what the owners do through their business models". Driver Tony Stewart gave comments of praise to the RTA's willingness to collaborate with NASCAR in an interview in July 2015.

=== Charter system ===
The charter system has drawn both praise and criticism from various personalities in NASCAR, with the system itself becoming a highly polarizing topic. Then-NASCAR president Steve Phelps praised the system at the time, stating that NASCAR was "all-in" on the system and that the system was "valuable to the sport overall" despite also saying the current system was not profitable to teams that had a charter. Phelps later became NASCAR's first Commissioner in 2025 before stepping away from the role in January 2026. His duties were subsequently assumed by NASCAR President Steve O'Donnell. The system has also seen praise from multiple beat reporters; when the system was first announced, The Evening Tribune's Ryan Papaserge defended it, stating that the implementation of it was "NASCAR adapting to the 21st century", defending how owners could have more freedom negotiating with sponsors or NASCAR leadership. In 2023, Sportcasting's John Moriello declared that removing the system would "diminish the value of teams faster than cryptocurrencies can devour a retirement nest egg", repelling potential investors.

Criticism of the charter system has come from various groups; particularly from smaller, single-car teams. After the system was implemented in 2016, Mike Hillman and his team, Hillman-Circle Sport, criticized the implementation of the system, which was officially implemented one week before the 2016 Daytona 500. When Germain Racing sold its charter and announced that it would be closing in 2020, the driver at the time, Ty Dillon, stated that he believed that the charter system had made it difficult for single-car teams who had not been "at the top level of the sport or [had] an incredible amount of money to leapfrog into the top spot". Another owner that shut down his team in the same year, Leavine Family Racing's Bob Leavine, stated that he blamed the charter system along with the pandemic as reasons for shutting down, while also stating that he did not get enough from selling his charter than what Leavine put into it. The guaranteed entries for chartered teams also raised comparisons to Indy Racing League's controversial "25/8 rule" for the 1996 Indianapolis 500 by The Indianapolis Star's Curt Cavin.

== Members ==
=== Current members ===
Team	Joined	Cars	Notes
23XI Racing	2021	3	
Front Row Motorsports	2014; 2022	3	Left in 2016, rejoined in 2022 (retained charters throughout)
Haas Factory Team	2025	1	
Hendrick Motorsports	2014	4	Founding member
Hyak Motorsports	2014	1	Formerly known as JTG Daugherty Racing
Joe Gibbs Racing	2014	4	Founding member
Kaulig Racing	2022	2	
Legacy Motor Club	2021	2	Formerly known as Petty GMS Motorsports
Richard Childress Racing	2014	2	Founding member
Rick Ware Racing	2022	1	Leasing a charter to RFK Racing in 2026
RFK Racing	2014	3	Founding member; formerly known as Roush Fenway Racing
Spire Motorsports	2021	3	
Team Penske	2014	3	Founding member
Trackhouse Racing	2022	3	
Wood Brothers Racing	2019	1	

=== Former members ===
Team	Joined	Left	Notes
BK Racing	2014	2018	Closed; assets sold to Front Row Motorsports
Chip Ganassi Racing	2014	2021	Founding member; team and its two charters sold to Trackhouse Racing
Circle Sport	2014	2016	Closed
Germain Racing	2014	2020	Closed; charter sold to 23XI Racing
Go Fas Racing	2014	2020	Closed; charter sold to Live Fast Motorsports
HScott Motorsports	2014	2016	Closed; two charters sold: one to Premium Motorsports after leasing charter from Premium in 2016, and one to Furniture Row Racing
Leavine Family Racing	2017	2020	Closed; previously bought from Tommy Baldwin Racing in 2016, charter later sold to Spire Motorsports
Live Fast Motorsports	2021	2023	Runs part-time schedule; sold charter to Spire Motorsports
Michael Waltrip Racing	2014	2015	Founding member; closed; two charters sold, one each to Stewart–Haas Racing and Joe Gibbs Racing in 2016
Phil Parsons Racing	2014	2015	Closed; assets sold to Premium Motorsports
Premium Motorsports	2017	2020	Closed; previously bought from HScott Motorsports, sold to Rick Ware Racing
Richard Petty Motorsports	2014	2021	Founding member; merged with GMS Racing to form Petty GMS Motorsports
Stewart–Haas Racing	2014	2024	Founding member; closed; charters sold to 23XI Racing, Front Row Motorsports and Trackhouse Racing. Co-owner Gene Haas retained a charter for new team Haas Factory Team.
Tommy Baldwin Racing	2014	2016	Closed; charter sold to Leavine Family Racing
