= Alessandra Neri =

Italian racing driver

- Nationality: Italian
- Born: 10 April 1988 (age 38) Forlì, Italy

TCR International Series career
- Debut season: 2016
- Current team: B.D. Racing
- Car number: 42
- Starts: 2

Previous series
- 2011 2010-11 2009, 12 2009 2008 2006-07 1997-05: Trofeo Maserati Europe; International GTSprint Series; Italian GT Championship; Spanish GT Championship; Endurance GT Series; Formula Azzurra; Karting

Alessandra Neri (born 10 April 1988) is an Italian racing driver currently competing in the TCR International Series. She previously competed in the International GTSprint Series, Italian GT Championship & Formula Azzurra amongst others.

== Racing career ==
Neri began her career in 1997 in Karting. She raced there for many seasons up until 2005. In 2006, she switched to the Italian Formula Azzurra Championship; she raced there up until 2007, finishing 8th in the championship standings that year. She switched to the Endurance GT Series for 2008. She made a one-off appearance in the Spanish GT Championship, while also racing in the Italian GT Championship in 2009. For 2010, she switched to the International GTSprint Series championship, finishing 2nd in the GTCup class standings in 2010 and 3rd in 2011. She made a one-off appearance in the 2011 Trofeo Maserati Europe series. In 2012, she returned to the Italian GT Championship, finishing 19th in the championship standings.

In May 2016, it was announced that she would race in the TCR International Series, driving a SEAT León Cup Racer for B.D. Racing.

== Racing record ==
=== Complete TCR International Series results ===
(key) (Races in bold indicate pole position) (Races in italics indicate fastest lap)

Year	Team	Car	1	2	3	4	5	6	7	8	9	10	11	12	13	14	15	16	17	18	19	20	21	22	DC	Points
2016	B.D. Racing	SEAT León Cup Racer	BHR; 1	BHR; 2	POR; 1	POR; 2	BEL; 1	BEL; 2	ITA; 1; 10	ITA; 2; 12	AUT; 1	AUT; 2	GER; 1	GER; 2	RUS; 1	RUS; 2	THA; 1	THA; 2	SIN; 1	SIN; 2	MYS; 1	MYS; 2	MAC; 1	MAC; 2	35th	1
