= Rob Kauffman (businessman) =

American businessman

- Born: Robert Kauffman; June 6, 1964 (age 62); Sharon, Connecticut, U.S.
- Occupations: Investment banker, racing team owner and driver
- Organization(s): Fortress Investment Group; Michael Waltrip Racing; Chip Ganassi Racing
- Title: Investor, Chip Ganassi Racing; Chairman, Race Team Alliance

Rolex Sports Car Series
- Categorisation: FIA Bronze
- Years active: 2012–2013
- Car number: 56
- Former teams: AF Waltrip
- Starts: 7
- Wins: 0
- Poles: 0
- Best finish: 39th in 2012, 2013

24 Hours of Le Mans career
- Years: 2012–2013
- Teams: AF Corse, AF Waltrip
- Best finish: 31st (2013)
- Class wins: 0

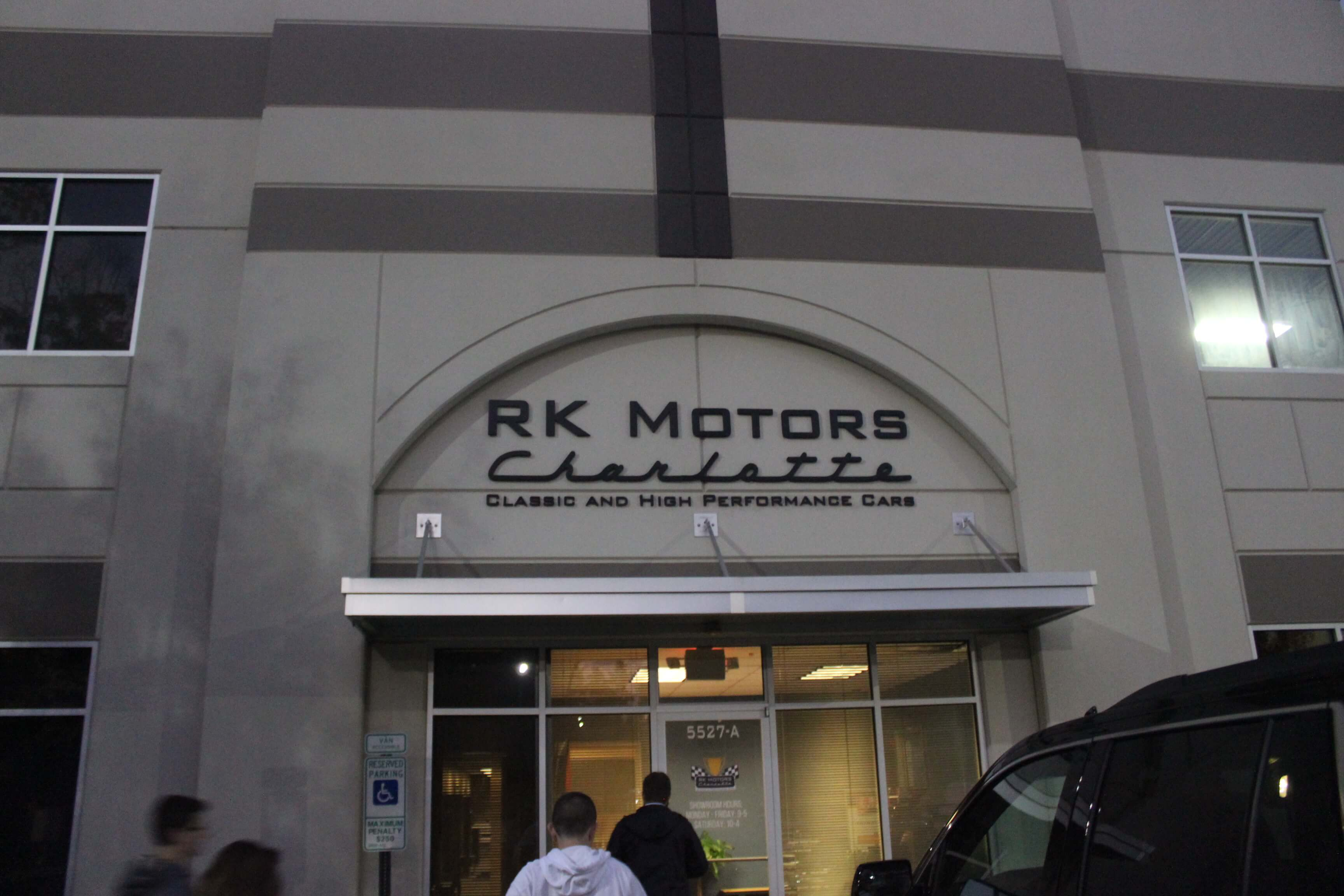
The entrance to RK Motors Charlotte, one of Kauffman's subsidiaries.

Robert Kauffman (born June 6, 1964) is an American businessman, investment banker, racing team owner and racing driver. Founder of Fortress Investment Group, Kauffman retired from investing in 2012.

== Motorsports ==
In October 2007, Kauffman purchased part ownership of Michael Waltrip Racing, a NASCAR Sprint Cup Series team. Kaufman also owns RK Motors, a car collection in Charlotte, North Carolina, where he resides; he also competes in sports car racing events and has competed in the 2011 and 2012 24 Hours of Le Mans, the 2012 and 2013 24 Hours of Daytona, and in the Rolex Sports Car Series. On July 7, 2014, Kauffman was named the chairman of the Race Team Alliance, a partnership between eighteen Cup teams.

In July 2015, SportsBusiness Daily reported that Kauffman was interested in purchasing a stake in Chip Ganassi Racing. It was verified the next day, when Kauffman confirmed that he was now a part of Ganassi's organization.

On January 8, 2024, Kauffman, alongside fellow former NASCAR team owner Ray Evernham, purchased the brand rights for International Race of Champions.

== Motorsports career results ==
=== Sports car racing ===
(key) (Races in bold indicate pole position, Results are overall/class)

==== 24 Hours of Le Mans results ====
24 Hours of Le Mans results
Year	Team	Co-Drivers	Car	Class	Laps	Pos.	Class Pos.
2011	(Italy) AF Corse	(United States) Michael Waltrip (Portugal) Rui Águas	Ferrari 458 Italia GTC	GTE; Pro	178	DNF	DNF
2012	(Italy) AF Waltrip	(United States) Brian Vickers (Portugal) Rui Águas	Ferrari 458 Italia GTC	GTE; Am	294	31st	6th

==== 24 Hours of Daytona ====
24 Hours of Daytona results
Year	Class	No	Team	Car	Co-drivers	Laps	Position	Class Pos.
2012	GT	56	(Italy) AF Waltrip	Ferrari 458	(Portugal) Rui Águas (United States) Michael Waltrip (United States) Travis Pastrana	645	35	22
2013	GT	56	(Italy) AF Waltrip	Ferrari 458	(Portugal) Rui Águas (United States) Michael Waltrip (United States) Clint Bowyer	677	16	8
