= 2004 FIA GT Hockenheim 500km =

Layout of the Hockenheimring

The 2004 FIA GT Hockenheim 500 km was the fourth round the 2004 FIA GT Championship season. It took place at the Hockenheimring, Germany, on May 16, 2004.

== Official results ==
Class winners in bold. Cars failing to complete 70% of winner's distance marked as Not Classified (NC).

Pos	Class	No	Team	Drivers	Chassis	Tyre	Laps
Pos	Class	No	Team	Drivers	Engine	Tyre	Laps
1	**GT**	**1**	**(Italy) BMS Scuderia Italia**	**(Italy) Matteo Bobbi (Switzerland) Gabriele Gardel**	**Ferrari 550-GTS Maranello**	MI	**105**
1	**GT**	**1**	**(Italy) BMS Scuderia Italia**	**(Italy) Matteo Bobbi (Switzerland) Gabriele Gardel**	**Ferrari 5.9L V12**	MI	**105**
2	GT	2	(Italy) BMS Scuderia Italia	(Italy) Fabrizio Gollin (Italy) Luca Cappellari	Ferrari 550-GTS Maranello	MI	105
2	GT	2	(Italy) BMS Scuderia Italia	(Italy) Fabrizio Gollin (Italy) Luca Cappellari	Ferrari 5.9L V12	MI	105
3	GT	3	(United Kingdom) Care Racing Developments (Italy) BMS Scuderia Italia	(Italy) Stefano Livio (Switzerland) Enzo Calderari (Switzerland) Lilian Bryner	Ferrari 550-GTS Maranello	MI	105
3	GT	3	(United Kingdom) Care Racing Developments (Italy) BMS Scuderia Italia	(Italy) Stefano Livio (Switzerland) Enzo Calderari (Switzerland) Lilian Bryner	Ferrari 5.9L V12	MI	105
4	GT	27	(United Kingdom) Creation Autosportif	(United Kingdom) Jamie Campbell-Walter (United Kingdom) Jamie Derbyshire	Lister Storm	D	105
4	GT	27	(United Kingdom) Creation Autosportif	(United Kingdom) Jamie Campbell-Walter (United Kingdom) Jamie Derbyshire	Jaguar 7.0L V12	D	105
5	GT	13	(Italy) G.P.C. Giesse Squadra Corse	(Italy) Emanuele Naspetti (Netherlands) Mike Hezemans	Ferrari 575-GTC Maranello	P	105
5	GT	13	(Italy) G.P.C. Giesse Squadra Corse	(Italy) Emanuele Naspetti (Netherlands) Mike Hezemans	Ferrari 6.0L V12	P	105
6	GT	11	(Italy) G.P.C. Giesse Squadra Corse	(Austria) Philipp Peter (Italy) Fabio Babini	Ferrari 575-GTC Maranello	P	105
6	GT	11	(Italy) G.P.C. Giesse Squadra Corse	(Austria) Philipp Peter (Italy) Fabio Babini	Ferrari 6.0L V12	P	105
7	GT	10	(Netherlands) Zwaans GTR Racing Team	(France) Christophe Bouchut (Sweden) Henrik Roos (Netherlands) Arjan van der Zwaan	Chrysler Viper GTS-R	D	104
7	GT	10	(Netherlands) Zwaans GTR Racing Team	(France) Christophe Bouchut (Sweden) Henrik Roos (Netherlands) Arjan van der Zwaan	Chrysler 8.0L V10	D	104
8	**N-GT**	**99**	**(Germany) Freisinger Motorsport**	**(Germany) Sascha Maassen (Germany) Lucas Luhr**	**Porsche 911 GT3-RSR**	MI	**103**
8	**N-GT**	**99**	**(Germany) Freisinger Motorsport**	**(Germany) Sascha Maassen (Germany) Lucas Luhr**	**Porsche 3.6L Flat-6**	MI	**103**
9	N-GT	50	(Germany) Yukos Freisinger Motorsport	(France) Emmanuel Collard (Monaco) Stéphane Ortelli	Porsche 911 GT3-RSR	MI	103
9	N-GT	50	(Germany) Yukos Freisinger Motorsport	(France) Emmanuel Collard (Monaco) Stéphane Ortelli	Porsche 3.6L Flat-6	MI	103
10	N-GT	62	(Italy) G.P.C. Giesse Squadra Corse	(Italy) Fabrizio de Simone (Italy) Christian Pescatori	Ferrari 360 Modena GTC	P	103
10	N-GT	62	(Italy) G.P.C. Giesse Squadra Corse	(Italy) Fabrizio de Simone (Italy) Christian Pescatori	Ferrari 3.6L V8	P	103
11	GT	8	(United Kingdom) Ray Mallock Ltd.	(United Kingdom) Chris Goodwin (Portugal) João Barbosa	Saleen S7-R	D	102
11	GT	8	(United Kingdom) Ray Mallock Ltd.	(United Kingdom) Chris Goodwin (Portugal) João Barbosa	Ford 7.0L V8	D	102
12	GT	18	(Monaco) JMB Racing	(United Kingdom) Ian Khan (Belgium) Bert Longin (Austria) Thomas Bleiner	Ferrari 575-GTC Maranello	MI	101
12	GT	18	(Monaco) JMB Racing	(United Kingdom) Ian Khan (Belgium) Bert Longin (Austria) Thomas Bleiner	Ferrari 6.0L V12	MI	101
13	GT	19	(Monaco) JMB	(France) Stéphane Daoudi (France) Antoine Gosse (Netherlands) Peter Kutemann	Ferrari 575-GTC Maranello	MI	99
13	GT	19	(Monaco) JMB	(France) Stéphane Daoudi (France) Antoine Gosse (Netherlands) Peter Kutemann	Ferrari 6.0L V12	MI	99
14	N-GT	69	(Germany) Proton Competition	(Germany) Gerold Ried (Germany) Christian Ried	Porsche 911 GT3-RS	D	95
14	N-GT	69	(Germany) Proton Competition	(Germany) Gerold Ried (Germany) Christian Ried	Porsche 3.6L Flat-6	D	95
15	GT	17	(Monaco) JMB Racing	(Austria) Karl Wendlinger (Austria) Toto Wolff (Austria) Robert Lechner	Ferrari 575-GTC Maranello	MI	92
15	GT	17	(Monaco) JMB Racing	(Austria) Karl Wendlinger (Austria) Toto Wolff (Austria) Robert Lechner	Ferrari 6.0L V12	MI	92
16	GT	14	(United Kingdom) Lister Racing	(United Kingdom) Patrick Pearce (Netherlands) Tom Coronel	Lister Storm	D	81
16	GT	14	(United Kingdom) Lister Racing	(United Kingdom) Patrick Pearce (Netherlands) Tom Coronel	Jaguar 7.0L V12	D	81
17	GT	5	(Germany) Vitaphone Racing Team (Germany) Konrad Motorsport	(Germany) Michael Bartels (Germany) Uwe Alzen	Saleen S7-R	P	80
17	GT	5	(Germany) Vitaphone Racing Team (Germany) Konrad Motorsport	(Germany) Michael Bartels (Germany) Uwe Alzen	Ford 7.0L V8	P	80
18	N-GT	56	(Italy) AB Motorsport	(Italy) Bruno Barbaro (Italy) Antonio De Castro (Italy) Renato Premoli	Porsche 911 GT3-RS	D	74
18	N-GT	56	(Italy) AB Motorsport	(Italy) Bruno Barbaro (Italy) Antonio De Castro (Italy) Renato Premoli	Porsche 3.6L Flat-6	D	74
19 DNF	N-GT	57	(Czech Republic) Vonka Racing	(Czech Republic) Jan Vonka (Italy) Mauro Casadei	Porsche 911 GT3-R	P	65
19 DNF	N-GT	57	(Czech Republic) Vonka Racing	(Czech Republic) Jan Vonka (Italy) Mauro Casadei	Porsche 3.6L Flat-6	P	65
20 DNF	GT	28	(United Kingdom) Graham Nash Motorsport	(Italy) Paolo Ruberti (Italy) Gabriele Lancieri (Germany) Wolfgang Kaufmann	Saleen S7-R	D	63
20 DNF	GT	28	(United Kingdom) Graham Nash Motorsport	(Italy) Paolo Ruberti (Italy) Gabriele Lancieri (Germany) Wolfgang Kaufmann	Ford 7.0L V8	D	63
21 DNF	GT	7	(United Kingdom) Ray Mallock Ltd.	(United Kingdom) Mike Newton (Brazil) Thomas Erdos	Saleen S7-R	D	62
21 DNF	GT	7	(United Kingdom) Ray Mallock Ltd.	(United Kingdom) Mike Newton (Brazil) Thomas Erdos	Ford 7.0L V8	D	62
22 DNF	GT	9	(Netherlands) Zwaans GTR Racing Team	(Germany) Klaus Abbelen (Belgium) Val Hillebrand (Netherlands) Rob van der Zwaan	Chrysler Viper GTS-R	D	29
22 DNF	GT	9	(Netherlands) Zwaans GTR Racing Team	(Germany) Klaus Abbelen (Belgium) Val Hillebrand (Netherlands) Rob van der Zwaan	Chrysler 8.0L V10	D	29
23 DNF	GT	4	(Germany) Konrad Motorsport	(Austria) Franz Konrad (Austria) Walter Lechner, Jr. (Switzerland) Toni Seiler	Saleen S7-R	P	27
23 DNF	GT	4	(Germany) Konrad Motorsport	(Austria) Franz Konrad (Austria) Walter Lechner, Jr. (Switzerland) Toni Seiler	Ford 7.0L V8	P	27
24 DNF	N-GT	77	(Germany) Yukos Freisinger Motorsport	(Russia) Nikolai Fomenko (Russia) Alexey Vasilyev	Porsche 911 GT3-RSR	MI	25
24 DNF	N-GT	77	(Germany) Yukos Freisinger Motorsport	(Russia) Nikolai Fomenko (Russia) Alexey Vasilyev	Porsche 3.6L Flat-6	MI	25
DNS	N-GT	59	(Germany) Jens Petersen Racing	(Germany) Jens Petersen (Germany) Kersten Jodexnis (Germany) Jan-Dirk Lueders	Porsche 911 GT3-RS	MI	–
DNS	N-GT	59	(Germany) Jens Petersen Racing	(Germany) Jens Petersen (Germany) Kersten Jodexnis (Germany) Jan-Dirk Lueders	Porsche 3.6L Flat-6	MI	–

== Statistics ==
- Pole position – #4 Konrad Motorsport – 1:37.132
- Fastest lap – #17 JMB Racing – 1:38.151
- Race winner average speed – 158.800 km/h

FIA GT Championship
Previous race: 2004 FIA GT Magny-Cours 500km	2004 season	Next race: 2004 FIA GT Brno 500km
