= 2004 FIA GT Valencia 500km =

Layout of the Circuit Ricardo Tormo

The 2004 FIA GT Valencia 500 km was the second round the 2004 FIA GT Championship season. It took place at the Circuit de Valencia, Spain, on April 18, 2004.

== Official results ==
Class winners in bold. Cars failing to complete 70% of winner's distance marked as Not Classified (NC).

Pos	Class	No	Team	Drivers	Chassis	Tyre	Laps
Pos	Class	No	Team	Drivers	Engine	Tyre	Laps
1	**GT**	**2**	**(Italy) BMS Scuderia Italia**	**(Italy) Fabrizio Gollin (Italy) Luca Cappellari**	**Ferrari 550-GTS Maranello**	MI	**112**
1	**GT**	**2**	**(Italy) BMS Scuderia Italia**	**(Italy) Fabrizio Gollin (Italy) Luca Cappellari**	**Ferrari 5.9L V12**	MI	**112**
2	GT	1	(Italy) BMS Scuderia Italia	(Italy) Matteo Bobbi (Switzerland) Gabriele Gardel	Ferrari 550-GTS Maranello	MI	112
2	GT	1	(Italy) BMS Scuderia Italia	(Italy) Matteo Bobbi (Switzerland) Gabriele Gardel	Ferrari 5.9L V12	MI	112
3	GT	29	(Germany) Reiter Engineering	(United Kingdom) Oliver Gavin (Netherlands) Peter Kox	Lamborghini Murciélago R-GT	MI	112
3	GT	29	(Germany) Reiter Engineering	(United Kingdom) Oliver Gavin (Netherlands) Peter Kox	Lamborghini 6.0L V12	MI	112
4	GT	17	(Monaco) JMB Racing	(Austria) Karl Wendlinger (Austria) Toto Wolff (Austria) Robert Lechner	Ferrari 575-GTC Maranello	MI	112
4	GT	17	(Monaco) JMB Racing	(Austria) Karl Wendlinger (Austria) Toto Wolff (Austria) Robert Lechner	Ferrari 6.0L V12	MI	112
5	GT	27	(United Kingdom) Creation Autosportif	(United Kingdom) Jamie Campbell-Walter (United Kingdom) Jamie Derbyshire	Lister Storm	D	111
5	GT	27	(United Kingdom) Creation Autosportif	(United Kingdom) Jamie Campbell-Walter (United Kingdom) Jamie Derbyshire	Jaguar 7.0L V12	D	111
6	GT	7	(United Kingdom) Ray Mallock Ltd.	(United Kingdom) Mike Newton (Brazil) Thomas Erdos	Saleen S7-R	D	110
6	GT	7	(United Kingdom) Ray Mallock Ltd.	(United Kingdom) Mike Newton (Brazil) Thomas Erdos	Ford 7.0L V8	D	110
7	**N-GT**	**99**	**(Germany) Freisinger Motorsport**	**(Germany) Sascha Maassen (Germany) Lucas Luhr**	**Porsche 911 GT3-RSR**	MI	**110**
7	**N-GT**	**99**	**(Germany) Freisinger Motorsport**	**(Germany) Sascha Maassen (Germany) Lucas Luhr**	**Porsche 3.6L Flat-6**	MI	**110**
8	GT	18	(Monaco) JMB Racing	(United Kingdom) Ian Khan (Belgium) Bert Longin (Austria) Thomas Bleiner	Ferrari 575-GTC Maranello	MI	110
8	GT	18	(Monaco) JMB Racing	(United Kingdom) Ian Khan (Belgium) Bert Longin (Austria) Thomas Bleiner	Ferrari 6.0L V12	MI	110
9	GT	19	(Monaco) JMB	(France) Stéphane Daoudi (France) Antoine Gosse (Italy) Andrea Garbagnati	Ferrari 575-GTC Maranello	MI	108
9	GT	19	(Monaco) JMB	(France) Stéphane Daoudi (France) Antoine Gosse (Italy) Andrea Garbagnati	Ferrari 6.0L V12	MI	108
10	N-GT	62	(Italy) G.P.C. Giesse Squadra Corse	(Italy) Fabrizio de Simone (Italy) Christian Pescatori	Ferrari 360 Modena GTC	P	107
10	N-GT	62	(Italy) G.P.C. Giesse Squadra Corse	(Italy) Fabrizio de Simone (Italy) Christian Pescatori	Ferrari 3.6L V8	P	107
11	GT	10	(Netherlands) Zwaans GTR Racing Team	(France) Christophe Bouchut (Belgium) Val Hillebrand (Netherlands) Arjan van der Zwaan	Chrysler Viper GTS-R	D	106
11	GT	10	(Netherlands) Zwaans GTR Racing Team	(France) Christophe Bouchut (Belgium) Val Hillebrand (Netherlands) Arjan van der Zwaan	Chrysler 8.0L V10	D	106
12	N-GT	50	(Germany) Yukos Freisinger Motorsport	(France) Emmanuel Collard (Monaco) Stéphane Ortelli	Porsche 911 GT3-RSR	MI	106
12	N-GT	50	(Germany) Yukos Freisinger Motorsport	(France) Emmanuel Collard (Monaco) Stéphane Ortelli	Porsche 3.6L Flat-6	MI	106
13	N-GT	77	(Germany) Yukos Freisinger Motorsport	(Russia) Nikolai Fomenko (Russia) Alexey Vasilyev	Porsche 911 GT3-RSR	MI	102
13	N-GT	77	(Germany) Yukos Freisinger Motorsport	(Russia) Nikolai Fomenko (Russia) Alexey Vasilyev	Porsche 3.6L Flat-6	MI	102
14	GT	8	(United Kingdom) Ray Mallock Ltd.	(United Kingdom) Chris Goodwin (Portugal) Miguel Ramos	Saleen S7-R	D	102
14	GT	8	(United Kingdom) Ray Mallock Ltd.	(United Kingdom) Chris Goodwin (Portugal) Miguel Ramos	Ford 7.0L V8	D	102
15	N-GT	69	(Germany) Proton Competition	(Germany) Gerold Ried (Germany) Christian Ried (Poland) Maciej Marcinkiewicz	Porsche 911 GT3-RS	D	102
15	N-GT	69	(Germany) Proton Competition	(Germany) Gerold Ried (Germany) Christian Ried (Poland) Maciej Marcinkiewicz	Porsche 3.6L Flat-6	D	102
16	N-GT	57	(Czech Republic) Vonka Racing	(Czech Republic) Jan Vonka (Slovakia) Miro Konopka	Porsche 911 GT3-R	P	99
16	N-GT	57	(Czech Republic) Vonka Racing	(Czech Republic) Jan Vonka (Slovakia) Miro Konopka	Porsche 3.6L Flat-6	P	99
17	GT	4	(Germany) Konrad Motorsport	(Austria) Franz Konrad (Austria) Walter Lechner, Jr. (Switzerland) Toni Seiler	Saleen S7-R	P	94
17	GT	4	(Germany) Konrad Motorsport	(Austria) Franz Konrad (Austria) Walter Lechner, Jr. (Switzerland) Toni Seiler	Ford 7.0L V8	P	94
18	GT	28	(United Kingdom) Graham Nash Motorsport	(Italy) Paolo Ruberti (Italy) Gabriele Lancieri (Spain) Jesús Diez de Villaroel	Saleen S7-R	D	92
18	GT	28	(United Kingdom) Graham Nash Motorsport	(Italy) Paolo Ruberti (Italy) Gabriele Lancieri (Spain) Jesús Diez de Villaroel	Ford 7.0L V8	D	92
19	GT	9	(Netherlands) Zwaans GTR Racing Team	(Germany) Klaus Abbelen (Sweden) Henrik Roos (Netherlands) Rob van der Zwaan	Chrysler Viper GTS-R	D	79
19	GT	9	(Netherlands) Zwaans GTR Racing Team	(Germany) Klaus Abbelen (Sweden) Henrik Roos (Netherlands) Rob van der Zwaan	Chrysler 8.0L V10	D	79
20 DNF	GT	11	(Italy) G.P.C. Giesse Squadra Corse	(Austria) Philipp Peter (Italy) Fabio Babini	Ferrari 575-GTC Maranello	P	66
20 DNF	GT	11	(Italy) G.P.C. Giesse Squadra Corse	(Austria) Philipp Peter (Italy) Fabio Babini	Ferrari 6.0L V12	P	66
21 DNF	GT	13	(Italy) G.P.C. Giesse Squadra Corse	(Italy) Emanuele Naspetti (Netherlands) Mike Hezemans	Ferrari 575-GTC Maranello	P	59
21 DNF	GT	13	(Italy) G.P.C. Giesse Squadra Corse	(Italy) Emanuele Naspetti (Netherlands) Mike Hezemans	Ferrari 6.0L V12	P	59
22 DNF	GT	22	(Germany) Wieth Racing	(Germany) Wolfgang Kaufmann (Spain) Miguel Ángel de Castro	Ferrari 550 Maranello	D	58
22 DNF	GT	22	(Germany) Wieth Racing	(Germany) Wolfgang Kaufmann (Spain) Miguel Ángel de Castro	Ferrari 6.0L V12	D	58
23 DNF	N-GT	58	(Spain) Darro Motor Racing	(Spain) Gines Vivancos (Spain) Luis Miguel Reyes	Ferrari 360 Modena GT	P	45
23 DNF	N-GT	58	(Spain) Darro Motor Racing	(Spain) Gines Vivancos (Spain) Luis Miguel Reyes	Ferrari 3.6L V8	P	45
24 DNF	GT	3	(United Kingdom) Care Racing Developments (Italy) BMS Scuderia Italia	(Italy) Stefano Livio (Switzerland) Enzo Calderari (Switzerland) Lilian Bryner	Ferrari 550-GTS Maranello	MI	33
24 DNF	GT	3	(United Kingdom) Care Racing Developments (Italy) BMS Scuderia Italia	(Italy) Stefano Livio (Switzerland) Enzo Calderari (Switzerland) Lilian Bryner	Ferrari 5.9L V12	MI	33
25 DNF	GT	14	(United Kingdom) Lister Cars	(United Kingdom) Patrick Pearce (United Kingdom) Paul Knapfield (Netherlands) Tom Coronel	Lister Storm	D	28
25 DNF	GT	14	(United Kingdom) Lister Cars	(United Kingdom) Patrick Pearce (United Kingdom) Paul Knapfield (Netherlands) Tom Coronel	Jaguar 7.0L V12	D	28
26 DNF	GT	5	(Germany) Vitaphone Racing Team (Germany) Konrad Motorsport	(Germany) Michael Bartels (Germany) Uwe Alzen	Saleen S7-R	P	8
26 DNF	GT	5	(Germany) Vitaphone Racing Team (Germany) Konrad Motorsport	(Germany) Michael Bartels (Germany) Uwe Alzen	Ford 7.0L V8	P	8

== Statistics ==
- Pole position – #5 Vitaphone Racing Team – 1:31.368
- Fastest lap – #5 Vitaphone Racing Team – 1:32.241
- Race winner average speed – 148.670 km/h

FIA GT Championship
Previous race: 2004 FIA GT Monza 500km	2004 season	Next race: 2004 FIA GT Magny-Cours 500km
