= 2004 FIA GT Brno 500km =

Layout of the Brno Circuit

The 2004 FIA GT Brno 500 km was the fifth round the 2004 FIA GT Championship season. It took place at the Brno Circuit, Czech Republic, on May 30, 2004.

== Official results ==
Class winners in bold. Cars failing to complete 70% of winner's distance marked as Not Classified (NC).

Pos	Class	No	Team	Drivers	Chassis	Tyre	Laps
Pos	Class	No	Team	Drivers	Engine	Tyre	Laps
1	**GT**	**5**	**(Germany) Vitaphone Racing Team (Germany) Konrad Motorsport**	**(Germany) Michael Bartels (Germany) Uwe Alzen**	**Saleen S7-R**	P	**87**
1	**GT**	**5**	**(Germany) Vitaphone Racing Team (Germany) Konrad Motorsport**	**(Germany) Michael Bartels (Germany) Uwe Alzen**	**Ford 7.0L V8**	P	**87**
2	GT	17	(Monaco) JMB Racing	(Austria) Karl Wendlinger (Brazil) Jaime Melo	Ferrari 575-GTC Maranello	MI	87
2	GT	17	(Monaco) JMB Racing	(Austria) Karl Wendlinger (Brazil) Jaime Melo	Ferrari 6.0L V12	MI	87
3	GT	2	(Italy) BMS Scuderia Italia	(Italy) Fabrizio Gollin (Italy) Luca Cappellari	Ferrari 550-GTS Maranello	MI	87
3	GT	2	(Italy) BMS Scuderia Italia	(Italy) Fabrizio Gollin (Italy) Luca Cappellari	Ferrari 5.9L V12	MI	87
4	GT	11	(Italy) G.P.C. Giesse Squadra Corse	(Austria) Philipp Peter (Italy) Fabio Babini	Ferrari 575-GTC Maranello	P	86
4	GT	11	(Italy) G.P.C. Giesse Squadra Corse	(Austria) Philipp Peter (Italy) Fabio Babini	Ferrari 6.0L V12	P	86
5	GT	27	(United Kingdom) Creation Autosportif	(United Kingdom) Jamie Campbell-Walter (United Kingdom) Jamie Derbyshire	Lister Storm	D	86
5	GT	27	(United Kingdom) Creation Autosportif	(United Kingdom) Jamie Campbell-Walter (United Kingdom) Jamie Derbyshire	Jaguar 7.0L V12	D	86
6	GT	4	(Germany) Konrad Motorsport	(Austria) Franz Konrad (Germany) Harald Becker (Switzerland) Toni Seiler	Saleen S7-R	P	86
6	GT	4	(Germany) Konrad Motorsport	(Austria) Franz Konrad (Germany) Harald Becker (Switzerland) Toni Seiler	Ford 7.0L V8	P	86
7	GT	3	(United Kingdom) Care Racing Developments (Italy) BMS Scuderia Italia	(Italy) Stefano Livio (Switzerland) Enzo Calderari (Switzerland) Lilian Bryner	Ferrari 550-GTS Maranello	MI	85
7	GT	3	(United Kingdom) Care Racing Developments (Italy) BMS Scuderia Italia	(Italy) Stefano Livio (Switzerland) Enzo Calderari (Switzerland) Lilian Bryner	Ferrari 5.9L V12	MI	85
8	GT	18	(Monaco) JMB Racing	(United Kingdom) Ian Khan (Belgium) Bert Longin (Austria) Robert Lechner	Ferrari 575-GTC Maranello	MI	85
8	GT	18	(Monaco) JMB Racing	(United Kingdom) Ian Khan (Belgium) Bert Longin (Austria) Robert Lechner	Ferrari 6.0L V12	MI	85
9	GT	10	(Netherlands) Zwaans GTR Racing Team	(Belgium) Stéphane Lemeret (Sweden) Henrik Roos (Netherlands) Arjan van der Zwaan	Chrysler Viper GTS-R	D	85
9	GT	10	(Netherlands) Zwaans GTR Racing Team	(Belgium) Stéphane Lemeret (Sweden) Henrik Roos (Netherlands) Arjan van der Zwaan	Chrysler 8.0L V10	D	85
10	**N-GT**	**62**	**(Italy) G.P.C. Giesse Squadra Corse**	**(Italy) Fabrizio de Simone (Italy) Christian Pescatori**	**Ferrari 360 Modena GTC**	P	**85**
10	**N-GT**	**62**	**(Italy) G.P.C. Giesse Squadra Corse**	**(Italy) Fabrizio de Simone (Italy) Christian Pescatori**	**Ferrari 3.6L V8**	P	**85**
11	GT	28	(United Kingdom) Graham Nash Motorsport	(Italy) Paolo Ruberti (Italy) Gabriele Lancieri (Belgium) Anthony Kumpen	Saleen S7-R	D	85
11	GT	28	(United Kingdom) Graham Nash Motorsport	(Italy) Paolo Ruberti (Italy) Gabriele Lancieri (Belgium) Anthony Kumpen	Ford 7.0L V8	D	85
12	N-GT	99	(Germany) Freisinger Motorsport	(Germany) Sascha Maassen (Germany) Lucas Luhr	Porsche 911 GT3-RSR	MI	85
12	N-GT	99	(Germany) Freisinger Motorsport	(Germany) Sascha Maassen (Germany) Lucas Luhr	Porsche 3.6L Flat-6	MI	85
13	N-GT	50	(Germany) Yukos Freisinger Motorsport	(France) Emmanuel Collard (Monaco) Stéphane Ortelli	Porsche 911 GT3-RSR	MI	85
13	N-GT	50	(Germany) Yukos Freisinger Motorsport	(France) Emmanuel Collard (Monaco) Stéphane Ortelli	Porsche 3.6L Flat-6	MI	85
14	GT	1	(Italy) BMS Scuderia Italia	(Italy) Matteo Bobbi (Switzerland) Gabriele Gardel	Ferrari 550-GTS Maranello	MI	84
14	GT	1	(Italy) BMS Scuderia Italia	(Italy) Matteo Bobbi (Switzerland) Gabriele Gardel	Ferrari 5.9L V12	MI	84
15	GT	7	(United Kingdom) Ray Mallock Ltd.	(United Kingdom) Mike Newton (Brazil) Thomas Erdos	Saleen S7-R	D	84
15	GT	7	(United Kingdom) Ray Mallock Ltd.	(United Kingdom) Mike Newton (Brazil) Thomas Erdos	Ford 7.0L V8	D	84
16	GT	8	(United Kingdom) Ray Mallock Ltd.	(United Kingdom) Chris Goodwin (Portugal) Miguel Ramos	Saleen S7-R	D	83
16	GT	8	(United Kingdom) Ray Mallock Ltd.	(United Kingdom) Chris Goodwin (Portugal) Miguel Ramos	Ford 7.0L V8	D	83
17	N-GT	77	(Germany) Yukos Freisinger Motorsport	(Russia) Nikolai Fomenko (Russia) Alexey Vasilyev	Porsche 911 GT3-RSR	MI	83
17	N-GT	77	(Germany) Yukos Freisinger Motorsport	(Russia) Nikolai Fomenko (Russia) Alexey Vasilyev	Porsche 3.6L Flat-6	MI	83
18	GT	19	(Monaco) JMB	(France) Stéphane Daoudi (France) Antoine Gosse (Netherlands) Peter Kutemann	Ferrari 575-GTC Maranello	MI	82
18	GT	19	(Monaco) JMB	(France) Stéphane Daoudi (France) Antoine Gosse (Netherlands) Peter Kutemann	Ferrari 6.0L V12	MI	82
19	N-GT	69	(Germany) Proton Competition	(Germany) Gerold Ried (Germany) Christian Ried	Porsche 911 GT3-RS	D	80
19	N-GT	69	(Germany) Proton Competition	(Germany) Gerold Ried (Germany) Christian Ried	Porsche 3.6L Flat-6	D	80
20	N-GT	57	(Czech Republic) Vonka Racing	(Czech Republic) Jan Vonka (Slovakia) Miro Konopka	Porsche 911 GT3-R	P	79
20	N-GT	57	(Czech Republic) Vonka Racing	(Czech Republic) Jan Vonka (Slovakia) Miro Konopka	Porsche 3.6L Flat-6	P	79
21	N-GT	63	(Germany) JVG Racing	(Austria) Horst Felbermayr, Sr. (Austria) Horst Felbermayr, Jr.	Porsche 911 GT3-RS	D	78
21	N-GT	63	(Germany) JVG Racing	(Austria) Horst Felbermayr, Sr. (Austria) Horst Felbermayr, Jr.	Porsche 3.6L Flat-6	D	78
22	N-GT	60	(Slovakia) Machánek Racing	(Czech Republic) Jaroslav Hozník (Slovakia) Rudolf Machánek	Porsche 911 GT3-RSR	D	76
22	N-GT	60	(Slovakia) Machánek Racing	(Czech Republic) Jaroslav Hozník (Slovakia) Rudolf Machánek	Porsche 3.6L Flat-6	D	76
23 DNF	N-GT	61	(Slovakia) Machánek Racing	(Czech Republic) Josef Venc (Hungary) Istvan Racz	Porsche 911 GT3-RS	D	50
23 DNF	N-GT	61	(Slovakia) Machánek Racing	(Czech Republic) Josef Venc (Hungary) Istvan Racz	Porsche 3.6L Flat-6	D	50
24 DNF	GT	13	(Italy) G.P.C. Giesse Squadra Corse	(Italy) Emanuele Naspetti (Netherlands) Mike Hezemans	Ferrari 575-GTC Maranello	P	41
24 DNF	GT	13	(Italy) G.P.C. Giesse Squadra Corse	(Italy) Emanuele Naspetti (Netherlands) Mike Hezemans	Ferrari 6.0L V12	P	41
22 DNF	GT	9	(Netherlands) Zwaans GTR Racing Team	(Germany) Klaus Abbelen (Belgium) Val Hillebrand (Netherlands) Rob van der Zwaan	Chrysler Viper GTS-R	D	6
22 DNF	GT	9	(Netherlands) Zwaans GTR Racing Team	(Germany) Klaus Abbelen (Belgium) Val Hillebrand (Netherlands) Rob van der Zwaan	Chrysler 8.0L V10	D	6

== Statistics ==
- Pole position – #1 BMS Scuderia Italia – 1:56.654
- Fastest lap – #5 Vitaphone Racing Team – 1:59.417
- Average speed – 156.480 km/h

FIA GT Championship
Previous race: 2004 FIA GT Hockenheim 500km	2004 season	Next race: 2004 FIA GT Donington 500km
