= 2004 FIA GT Oschersleben 500km =

Layout of the Motorsport Arena Oschersleben

The 2004 FIA GT Oschersleben 500 km was the ninth round the 2004 FIA GT Championship season. It took place at the Motorsport Arena Oschersleben, Germany, on September 19, 2004.

Following the debut of the MC12 at the previous round in Imola, AF Corse scored their maiden victory here in Oschersleben. The team and their drivers were however still ineligible to score points due to the MC12's homologations problems.

== Official results ==
Class winners in bold. Cars failing to complete 70% of winner's distance marked as Not Classified (NC).

Pos	Class	No	Team	Drivers	Chassis	Tyre	Laps
Pos	Class	No	Team	Drivers	Engine	Tyre	Laps
1	**GT**	**33**	**(Italy) AF Corse**	**(Italy) Andrea Bertolini (Finland) Mika Salo**	**Maserati MC12 GT1**	P	**118**
1	**GT**	**33**	**(Italy) AF Corse**	**(Italy) Andrea Bertolini (Finland) Mika Salo**	**Maserati 6.0L V12**	P	**118**
2	GT	2	(Italy) BMS Scuderia Italia	(Italy) Fabrizio Gollin (Italy) Luca Cappellari	Ferrari 550-GTS Maranello	MI	117
2	GT	2	(Italy) BMS Scuderia Italia	(Italy) Fabrizio Gollin (Italy) Luca Cappellari	Ferrari 5.9L V12	MI	117
3	GT	8	(United Kingdom) Ray Mallock Ltd.	(United Kingdom) Chris Goodwin (Portugal) José Pedro Fontes	Saleen S7-R	D	117
3	GT	8	(United Kingdom) Ray Mallock Ltd.	(United Kingdom) Chris Goodwin (Portugal) José Pedro Fontes	Ford 7.0L V8	D	117
4	GT	17	(Monaco) JMB Racing	(Austria) Karl Wendlinger (Brazil) Jaime Melo	Ferrari 575-GTC Maranello	MI	117
4	GT	17	(Monaco) JMB Racing	(Austria) Karl Wendlinger (Brazil) Jaime Melo	Ferrari 6.0L V12	MI	117
5	GT	1	(Italy) BMS Scuderia Italia	(Italy) Matteo Bobbi (Switzerland) Gabriele Gardel	Ferrari 550-GTS Maranello	MI	116
5	GT	1	(Italy) BMS Scuderia Italia	(Italy) Matteo Bobbi (Switzerland) Gabriele Gardel	Ferrari 5.9L V12	MI	116
6	GT	3	(United Kingdom) Care Racing Developments (Italy) BMS Scuderia Italia	(Italy) Stefano Livio (Switzerland) Enzo Calderari (Switzerland) Lilian Bryner	Ferrari 550-GTS Maranello	MI	116
6	GT	3	(United Kingdom) Care Racing Developments (Italy) BMS Scuderia Italia	(Italy) Stefano Livio (Switzerland) Enzo Calderari (Switzerland) Lilian Bryner	Ferrari 5.9L V12	MI	116
7	GT	7	(United Kingdom) Ray Mallock Ltd.	(United Kingdom) Mike Newton (Brazil) Thomas Erdos	Saleen S7-R	D	116
7	GT	7	(United Kingdom) Ray Mallock Ltd.	(United Kingdom) Mike Newton (Brazil) Thomas Erdos	Ford 7.0L V8	D	116
8	GT	34	(Italy) AF Corse	(Italy) Fabrizio de Simone (United Kingdom) Johnny Herbert	Maserati MC12 GT1	P	116
8	GT	34	(Italy) AF Corse	(Italy) Fabrizio de Simone (United Kingdom) Johnny Herbert	Maserati 6.0L V12	P	116
9	**N-GT**	**99**	**(Germany) Freisinger Motorsport**	**(Germany) Lucas Luhr (Germany) Sascha Maassen**	**Porsche 911 GT3-RSR**	MI	**116**
9	**N-GT**	**99**	**(Germany) Freisinger Motorsport**	**(Germany) Lucas Luhr (Germany) Sascha Maassen**	**Porsche 3.6L Flat-6**	MI	**116**
10	N-GT	50	(Germany) Yukos Freisinger Motorsport	(France) Emmanuel Collard (Monaco) Stéphane Ortelli	Porsche 911 GT3-RSR	MI	115
10	N-GT	50	(Germany) Yukos Freisinger Motorsport	(France) Emmanuel Collard (Monaco) Stéphane Ortelli	Porsche 3.6L Flat-6	MI	115
11	GT	11	(Italy) G.P.C. Giesse Squadra Corse	(Austria) Philipp Peter (Italy) Fabio Babini	Ferrari 575-GTC Maranello	P	115
11	GT	11	(Italy) G.P.C. Giesse Squadra Corse	(Austria) Philipp Peter (Italy) Fabio Babini	Ferrari 6.0L V12	P	115
12	GT	18	(Monaco) JMB Racing	(United Kingdom) Chris Buncombe (Belgium) Bert Longin (Russia) Sergei Zlobin	Ferrari 575-GTC Maranello	MI	115
12	GT	18	(Monaco) JMB Racing	(United Kingdom) Chris Buncombe (Belgium) Bert Longin (Russia) Sergei Zlobin	Ferrari 6.0L V12	MI	115
13	N-GT	62	(Italy) G.P.C. Giesse Squadra Corse	(Belgium) Vincent Vosse (Italy) Christian Pescatori	Ferrari 360 Modena GTC	P	115
13	N-GT	62	(Italy) G.P.C. Giesse Squadra Corse	(Belgium) Vincent Vosse (Italy) Christian Pescatori	Ferrari 3.6L V8	P	115
14	GT	28	(United Kingdom) Graham Nash Motorsport	(Italy) Paolo Ruberti (Germany) Wolfgang Kaufmann (United Kingdom) Jamie Wall	Saleen S7-R	D	113
14	GT	28	(United Kingdom) Graham Nash Motorsport	(Italy) Paolo Ruberti (Germany) Wolfgang Kaufmann (United Kingdom) Jamie Wall	Ford 7.0L V8	D	113
15	N-GT	77	(Germany) Yukos Freisinger Motorsport	(Russia) Nikolai Fomenko (Russia) Alexey Vasilyev	Porsche 911 GT3-RSR	MI	113
15	N-GT	77	(Germany) Yukos Freisinger Motorsport	(Russia) Nikolai Fomenko (Russia) Alexey Vasilyev	Porsche 3.6L Flat-6	MI	113
16	GT	10	(Netherlands) Zwaans GTR Racing Team	(Belgium) Val Hillebrand (Sweden) Henrik Roos (Netherlands) Rob van der Zwaan	Chrysler Viper GTS-R	D	112
16	GT	10	(Netherlands) Zwaans GTR Racing Team	(Belgium) Val Hillebrand (Sweden) Henrik Roos (Netherlands) Rob van der Zwaan	Chrysler 8.0L V10	D	112
17	GT	19	(Monaco) JMB	(France) Stéphane Daoudi (France) Antoine Gosse (Netherlands) Peter Kutemann	Ferrari 575-GTC Maranello	MI	112
17	GT	19	(Monaco) JMB	(France) Stéphane Daoudi (France) Antoine Gosse (Netherlands) Peter Kutemann	Ferrari 6.0L V12	MI	112
18	GT	26	(France) DAMS	(Italy) Beppe Gabbiani (Bolivia) Filipe Ortiz	Lamborghini Murciélago R-GT	MI	109
18	GT	26	(France) DAMS	(Italy) Beppe Gabbiani (Bolivia) Filipe Ortiz	Lamborghini 6.0L V12	MI	109
19	GT	4	(Germany) Konrad Motorsport	(Austria) Franz Konrad (Austria) Walter Lechner, Jr. (Switzerland) Toni Seiler	Saleen S7-R	P	108
19	GT	4	(Germany) Konrad Motorsport	(Austria) Franz Konrad (Austria) Walter Lechner, Jr. (Switzerland) Toni Seiler	Ford 7.0L V8	P	108
20	N-GT	69	(Germany) Proton Competition	(Germany) Gerold Ried (Germany) Christian Ried (Poland) Maciej Marcinkiewicz	Porsche 911 GT3-RS	D	108
20	N-GT	69	(Germany) Proton Competition	(Germany) Gerold Ried (Germany) Christian Ried (Poland) Maciej Marcinkiewicz	Porsche 3.6L Flat-6	D	108
21	N-GT	59	(Germany) Jens Petersen Racing	(Germany) Jens Petersen (Germany) Kersten Jodexnis (Germany) Jan-Dirk Lueders	Porsche 911 GT3-RS	MI	106
21	N-GT	59	(Germany) Jens Petersen Racing	(Germany) Jens Petersen (Germany) Kersten Jodexnis (Germany) Jan-Dirk Lueders	Porsche 3.6L Flat-6	MI	106
22	N-GT	57	(Czech Republic) Vonka Racing	(Czech Republic) Jan Vonka (Italy) Mauro Casadei	Porsche 911 GT3-R	P	105
22	N-GT	57	(Czech Republic) Vonka Racing	(Czech Republic) Jan Vonka (Italy) Mauro Casadei	Porsche 3.6L Flat-6	P	105
23	GT	5	(Germany) Vitaphone Racing Team (Germany) Konrad Motorsport	(Germany) Michael Bartels (Germany) Uwe Alzen	Saleen S7-R	P	105
23	GT	5	(Germany) Vitaphone Racing Team (Germany) Konrad Motorsport	(Germany) Michael Bartels (Germany) Uwe Alzen	Ford 7.0L V8	P	105
24 DNF	GT	24	(France) DAMS	(Italy) Andrea Piccini (Switzerland) Jean-Denis Délétraz	Lamborghini Murciélago R-GT	MI	79
24 DNF	GT	24	(France) DAMS	(Italy) Andrea Piccini (Switzerland) Jean-Denis Délétraz	Lamborghini 6.0L V12	MI	79
25 DNF	GT	13	(Italy) G.P.C. Giesse Squadra Corse	(Italy) Emanuele Naspetti (Italy) Gianni Morbidelli	Ferrari 575-GTC Maranello	P	40
25 DNF	GT	13	(Italy) G.P.C. Giesse Squadra Corse	(Italy) Emanuele Naspetti (Italy) Gianni Morbidelli	Ferrari 6.0L V12	P	40

== Statistics ==
- Pole position – #4 Konrad Motorsport – 1:23.543
- Fastest lap – #5 Vitaphone Racing Team – 1:24.701
- Average speed – 143.810 km/h

FIA GT Championship
Previous race: 2004 FIA GT Imola 500km	2004 season	Next race: 2004 FIA GT Dubai 500km
