= 2004 FIA GT Championship =

Sports season

Seasons
- ← 2003 2005 →

The 2004 FIA GT Championship season was the 8th season of the FIA GT Championship. It was a series contested by Grand Touring style cars broken into two classes based on power and manufacturer involvement, called GT and N-GT. It began on 28 March 2004 and ended 14 November 2004 after 11 races.

== Schedule ==
Rnd	Race	Circuit	Date
1	(Italy) LG Super Racing Weekend Monza	Autodromo Nazionale Monza	28 March
2	(Spain) LG Super Racing Weekend Valencia	Circuit de Valencia	18 April
3	(France) LG Super Racing Weekend Magny-Cours	Circuit de Nevers Magny-Cours	2 May
4	(Germany) LG Super Racing Weekend Hockenheim	Hockenheimring	16 May
5	(Czech Republic) LG Super Racing Weekend Brno	Autodrom Brno Masaryk	30 May
6	(United Kingdom) LG Super Racing Weekend Donington	Donington Park	27 June
7	(Belgium) Proximus Spa 24 Hours	Circuit de Spa-Francorchamps	31 July; 1 August
8	(Italy) LG Super Racing Weekend Imola	Autodromo Enzo e Dino Ferrari	5 September
9	(Germany) LG Super Racing Weekend Oschersleben	Motopark Oschersleben	19 September
10	(United Arab Emirates) LG Super Racing Weekend Dubai	Dubai Autodrome	8 October
11	(China) LG Super Racing Weekend Zhuhai	Zhuhai International Circuit	14 November

== Entries ==
=== GT ===
Entrant	Car	Engine	Tyre	No.	Drivers	Rounds
(Italy) BMS Scuderia Italia	Ferrari 550-GTS Maranello	Ferrari F133 5.9 L V12	M	1	(Italy) Matteo Bobbi	All
(Italy) BMS Scuderia Italia	Ferrari 550-GTS Maranello	Ferrari F133 5.9 L V12	M	1	(Switzerland) Gabriele Gardel	All
(Italy) BMS Scuderia Italia	Ferrari 550-GTS Maranello	Ferrari F133 5.9 L V12	M	1	(Italy) Stefano Livio	7
(Italy) BMS Scuderia Italia	Ferrari 550-GTS Maranello	Ferrari F133 5.9 L V12	M	1	(Spain) Miguel Ángel de Castro	7
(Italy) BMS Scuderia Italia	Ferrari 550-GTS Maranello	Ferrari F133 5.9 L V12	M	2	(Italy) Fabrizio Gollin	1–10
(Italy) BMS Scuderia Italia	Ferrari 550-GTS Maranello	Ferrari F133 5.9 L V12	M	2	(Italy) Luca Cappellari	1–10
(Italy) BMS Scuderia Italia	Ferrari 550-GTS Maranello	Ferrari F133 5.9 L V12	M	2	(Switzerland) Lilian Bryner	7
(Italy) BMS Scuderia Italia	Ferrari 550-GTS Maranello	Ferrari F133 5.9 L V12	M	2	(Switzerland) Enzo Calderari	7
(Italy) BMS Scuderia Italia	Ferrari 550-GTS Maranello	Ferrari F133 5.9 L V12	M	2	(Italy) Luca Drudi	11
(Italy) BMS Scuderia Italia	Ferrari 550-GTS Maranello	Ferrari F133 5.9 L V12	M	2	(Italy) Nicola Cadei	11
(Italy) BMS Scuderia Italia	Ferrari 550-GTS Maranello	Ferrari F133 5.9 L V12	M	2	(Switzerland) Frédéric Dor	11
(United Kingdom) Care Racing	Ferrari 550-GTS Maranello	Ferrari F133 5.9 L V12	M	3	(Switzerland) Lilian Bryner	1–6, 8–11
(United Kingdom) Care Racing	Ferrari 550-GTS Maranello	Ferrari F133 5.9 L V12	M	3	(Switzerland) Enzo Calderari	1–6, 8–11
(United Kingdom) Care Racing	Ferrari 550-GTS Maranello	Ferrari F133 5.9 L V12	M	3	(Italy) Stefano Livio	1–6, 8–9
(United Kingdom) Care Racing	Ferrari 550-GTS Maranello	Ferrari F133 5.9 L V12	M	3	(Italy) Thomas Biagi	10
(United Kingdom) Care Racing	Ferrari 550-GTS Maranello	Ferrari F133 5.9 L V12	M	3	(France) Christophe Bouchut	11
(Germany) Konrad Motorsport	Saleen S7-R	Ford 6.9 L V8	P	4	(Switzerland) Toni Seiler	1–10
(Germany) Konrad Motorsport	Saleen S7-R	Ford 6.9 L V8	P	4	(Austria) Walter Lechner Jr.	1–4, 7–11
(Germany) Konrad Motorsport	Saleen S7-R	Ford 6.9 L V8	P	4	(Austria) Franz Konrad	1–2, 4–5, 8, 11
(Germany) Konrad Motorsport	Saleen S7-R	Ford 6.9 L V8	P	4	(Germany) Harald Becker	5–6
(Germany) Konrad Motorsport	Saleen S7-R	Ford 6.9 L V8	P	4	(United Kingdom) Paul Knapfield	6–7
(Germany) Konrad Motorsport	Saleen S7-R	Ford 6.9 L V8	P	4	(Austria) Wolfgang Treml	7
(Germany) Konrad Motorsport	Saleen S7-R	Ford 6.9 L V8	P	4	(Greece) Alexandros Margaritis	10–11
(Germany) Vitaphone Racing Team	Saleen S7-R	Ford 6.9 L V8	P	5	(Germany) Michael Bartels	All
(Germany) Vitaphone Racing Team	Saleen S7-R	Ford 6.9 L V8	P	5	(Germany) Uwe Alzen	All
(Germany) Vitaphone Racing Team	Saleen S7-R	Ford 6.9 L V8	P	5	(Austria) Franz Konrad	7
(Germany) Vitaphone Racing Team	Saleen S7-R	Ford 6.9 L V8	P	5	(Belgium) Eric van de Poele	7
(United Kingdom) RML	Saleen S7-R	Ford 6.9 L V8	D	7	(Brazil) Thomas Erdos	All
(United Kingdom) RML	Saleen S7-R	Ford 6.9 L V8	D	7	(United Kingdom) Mike Newton	All
(United Kingdom) RML	Saleen S7-R	Ford 6.9 L V8	D	7	(United Kingdom) Chris Goodwin	7
(United Kingdom) RML	Saleen S7-R	Ford 6.9 L V8	D	7	(Portugal) Miguel Ramos	7
(United Kingdom) RML	Saleen S7-R	Ford 6.9 L V8	D	8	(United Kingdom) Chris Goodwin	1–6, 8–11
(United Kingdom) RML	Saleen S7-R	Ford 6.9 L V8	D	8	(Portugal) Miguel Ramos	1–3, 5–6, 8
(United Kingdom) RML	Saleen S7-R	Ford 6.9 L V8	D	8	(Portugal) João Barbosa	4
(United Kingdom) RML	Saleen S7-R	Ford 6.9 L V8	D	8	(United Kingdom) Michael Mallock	7, 11
(United Kingdom) RML	Saleen S7-R	Ford 6.9 L V8	D	8	(United Kingdom) Ray Mallock	7
(United Kingdom) RML	Saleen S7-R	Ford 6.9 L V8	D	8	(United Kingdom) Adam Wiseberg	7
(United Kingdom) RML	Saleen S7-R	Ford 6.9 L V8	D	8	(Portugal) José Pedro Fontes	9–10
(Netherlands) Zwaans GTR Racing Team	Chrysler Viper GTS-R	Chrysler 356-T6 8.0 L V10	D	9	(Netherlands) Rob van der Zwaan	1–7
(Netherlands) Zwaans GTR Racing Team	Chrysler Viper GTS-R	Chrysler 356-T6 8.0 L V10	D	9	(Germany) Klaus Abbelen	1–5
(Netherlands) Zwaans GTR Racing Team	Chrysler Viper GTS-R	Chrysler 356-T6 8.0 L V10	D	9	(Sweden) Henrik Roos	1–2, 7
(Netherlands) Zwaans GTR Racing Team	Chrysler Viper GTS-R	Chrysler 356-T6 8.0 L V10	D	9	(Belgium) Val Hillebrand	4–7
(Netherlands) Zwaans GTR Racing Team	Chrysler Viper GTS-R	Chrysler 356-T6 8.0 L V10	D	9	(Netherlands) Arjan van der Zwaan	7
(Netherlands) Zwaans GTR Racing Team	Chrysler Viper GTS-R	Chrysler 356-T6 8.0 L V10	D	10	(Netherlands) Arjan van der Zwaan	1–6
(Netherlands) Zwaans GTR Racing Team	Chrysler Viper GTS-R	Chrysler 356-T6 8.0 L V10	D	10	(France) Christophe Bouchut	1–4, 8
(Netherlands) Zwaans GTR Racing Team	Chrysler Viper GTS-R	Chrysler 356-T6 8.0 L V10	D	10	(Belgium) Marc Goossens	1
(Netherlands) Zwaans GTR Racing Team	Chrysler Viper GTS-R	Chrysler 356-T6 8.0 L V10	D	10	(Belgium) Val Hillebrand	2, 8–11
(Netherlands) Zwaans GTR Racing Team	Chrysler Viper GTS-R	Chrysler 356-T6 8.0 L V10	D	10	(Sweden) Henrik Roos	3–6, 9–10
(Netherlands) Zwaans GTR Racing Team	Chrysler Viper GTS-R	Chrysler 356-T6 8.0 L V10	D	10	(Belgium) Stéphane Lémeret	5–8, 10
(Netherlands) Zwaans GTR Racing Team	Chrysler Viper GTS-R	Chrysler 356-T6 8.0 L V10	D	10	(Belgium) Marc Duez	7
(Netherlands) Zwaans GTR Racing Team	Chrysler Viper GTS-R	Chrysler 356-T6 8.0 L V10	D	10	(Belgium) Fanny Duchâteau	7
(Netherlands) Zwaans GTR Racing Team	Chrysler Viper GTS-R	Chrysler 356-T6 8.0 L V10	D	10	(Belgium) Loïc Deman	7
(Netherlands) Zwaans GTR Racing Team	Chrysler Viper GTS-R	Chrysler 356-T6 8.0 L V10	D	10	(Netherlands) Rob van der Zwaan	9, 11
(Italy) GPC Giesse Squadra Corse	Ferrari 575 GTC	Ferrari F133 GT 6.0 L V12	P	11	(Italy) Fabio Babini	All
(Italy) GPC Giesse Squadra Corse	Ferrari 575 GTC	Ferrari F133 GT 6.0 L V12	P	11	(Austria) Philipp Peter	1–9
(Italy) GPC Giesse Squadra Corse	Ferrari 575 GTC	Ferrari F133 GT 6.0 L V12	P	11	(Finland) Mika Salo	7
(Italy) GPC Giesse Squadra Corse	Ferrari 575 GTC	Ferrari F133 GT 6.0 L V12	P	11	(Belgium) Vincent Vosse	7
(Italy) GPC Giesse Squadra Corse	Ferrari 575 GTC	Ferrari F133 GT 6.0 L V12	P	11	(Italy) Gianni Morbidelli	10–11
(Italy) GPC Giesse Squadra Corse	Ferrari 575 GTC	Ferrari F133 GT 6.0 L V12	P	13	(Italy) Emanuele Naspetti	All
(Italy) GPC Giesse Squadra Corse	Ferrari 575 GTC	Ferrari F133 GT 6.0 L V12	P	13	(Netherlands) Mike Hezemans	1–5
(Italy) GPC Giesse Squadra Corse	Ferrari 575 GTC	Ferrari F133 GT 6.0 L V12	P	13	(Italy) Gianni Morbidelli	6–9
(Italy) GPC Giesse Squadra Corse	Ferrari 575 GTC	Ferrari F133 GT 6.0 L V12	P	13	(Belgium) Didier Defourny	7
(Italy) GPC Giesse Squadra Corse	Ferrari 575 GTC	Ferrari F133 GT 6.0 L V12	P	13	(Belgium) Frédéric Bouvy	7
(Italy) GPC Giesse Squadra Corse	Ferrari 575 GTC	Ferrari F133 GT 6.0 L V12	P	13	(Austria) Philipp Peter	10–11
(United Kingdom) Lister Racing	Lister Storm GTM	Jaguar 7.0 L V12	D	14	(United Kingdom) Patrick Pearce	1–2, 4
(United Kingdom) Lister Racing	Lister Storm GTM	Jaguar 7.0 L V12	D	14	(Netherlands) Tom Coronel	1–2, 4
(United Kingdom) Lister Racing	Lister Storm GTM	Jaguar 7.0 L V12	D	14	(United Kingdom) Paul Knapfield	1–2
(United Kingdom) Lister Racing	Lister Storm GTM	Jaguar 7.0 L V12	D	14	(United Kingdom) Gregor Fisken	7
(United Kingdom) Lister Racing	Lister Storm GTM	Jaguar 7.0 L V12	D	14	(United Kingdom) Ian Donaldson	7
(United Kingdom) Lister Racing	Lister Storm GTM	Jaguar 7.0 L V12	D	14	(United Kingdom) Robert Schirle	7
(Monaco) JMB Racing	Ferrari 575 GTC	Ferrari F133 GT 6.0 L V12	M	17	(Austria) Karl Wendlinger	All
(Monaco) JMB Racing	Ferrari 575 GTC	Ferrari F133 GT 6.0 L V12	M	17	(Austria) Toto Wolff	1–4
(Monaco) JMB Racing	Ferrari 575 GTC	Ferrari F133 GT 6.0 L V12	M	17	(Austria) Robert Lechner	1–4
(Monaco) JMB Racing	Ferrari 575 GTC	Ferrari F133 GT 6.0 L V12	M	17	(Brazil) Jaime Melo	5–6, 8
(Monaco) JMB Racing	Ferrari 575 GTC	Ferrari F133 GT 6.0 L V12	M	17	(Belgium) Bert Longin	7
(Monaco) JMB Racing	Ferrari 575 GTC	Ferrari F133 GT 6.0 L V12	M	17	(Belgium) Pierre-Yves Corthals	7
(Monaco) JMB Racing	Ferrari 575 GTC	Ferrari F133 GT 6.0 L V12	M	17	(Germany) Alex Müller	7
(Monaco) JMB Racing	Ferrari 575 GTC	Ferrari F133 GT 6.0 L V12	M	17	(Brazil) Tarso Marques	9–11
(Monaco) JMB Racing	Ferrari 575 GTC	Ferrari F133 GT 6.0 L V12	M	17	(Switzerland) Iradj Alexander	11
(Monaco) JMB Racing	Ferrari 575 GTC	Ferrari F133 GT 6.0 L V12	M	18	(Belgium) Bert Longin	1–6, 8–11
(Monaco) JMB Racing	Ferrari 575 GTC	Ferrari F133 GT 6.0 L V12	M	18	(United Kingdom) Ian Khan	1–5
(Monaco) JMB Racing	Ferrari 575 GTC	Ferrari F133 GT 6.0 L V12	M	18	(France) Christophe Pillon	1
(Monaco) JMB Racing	Ferrari 575 GTC	Ferrari F133 GT 6.0 L V12	M	18	(Austria) Thomas Bleiner	2–4
(Monaco) JMB Racing	Ferrari 575 GTC	Ferrari F133 GT 6.0 L V12	M	18	(Austria) Robert Lechner	5
(Monaco) JMB Racing	Ferrari 575 GTC	Ferrari F133 GT 6.0 L V12	M	18	(Italy) Lorenzo Casè	6
(Monaco) JMB Racing	Ferrari 575 GTC	Ferrari F133 GT 6.0 L V12	M	18	(Italy) Matteo Malucelli	6
(Monaco) JMB Racing	Ferrari 575 GTC	Ferrari F133 GT 6.0 L V12	M	18	(Netherlands) Peter Kutemann	7
(Monaco) JMB Racing	Ferrari 575 GTC	Ferrari F133 GT 6.0 L V12	M	18	(Italy) Andrea Garbagnati	7
(Monaco) JMB Racing	Ferrari 575 GTC	Ferrari F133 GT 6.0 L V12	M	18	(France) Antoine Gosse	7
(Monaco) JMB Racing	Ferrari 575 GTC	Ferrari F133 GT 6.0 L V12	M	18	(Russia) Sergey Zlobin	8–11
(Monaco) JMB Racing	Ferrari 575 GTC	Ferrari F133 GT 6.0 L V12	M	18	(United Kingdom) Chris Buncombe	8–10
(Monaco) JMB Racing	Ferrari 575 GTC	Ferrari F133 GT 6.0 L V12	M	18	(Italy) Maurizio Mediani	11
(Monaco) JMB	Ferrari 575 GTC	Ferrari F133 GT 6.0 L V12	M	19	(France) Antoine Gosse	1–6, 8–9
(Monaco) JMB	Ferrari 575 GTC	Ferrari F133 GT 6.0 L V12	M	19	(France) Stéphane Daoudi	1–5, 9–11
(Monaco) JMB	Ferrari 575 GTC	Ferrari F133 GT 6.0 L V12	M	19	(Netherlands) Peter Kutemann	1, 3–5, 8–11
(Monaco) JMB	Ferrari 575 GTC	Ferrari F133 GT 6.0 L V12	M	19	(Italy) Andrea Garbagnati	2, 6, 10
(Monaco) JMB	Ferrari 575 GTC	Ferrari F133 GT 6.0 L V12	M	19	(Italy) Mauro Casadei	6, 11
(Monaco) JMB	Ferrari 575 GTC	Ferrari F133 GT 6.0 L V12	M	19	(Italy) Matteo Malucelli	8
(Germany) Wieth Racing	Ferrari 550 GTS	Ferrari F133 6.0 L V12	D	22	(Germany) Wolfgang Kaufmann	1–3, 6
(Germany) Wieth Racing	Ferrari 550 GTS	Ferrari F133 6.0 L V12	D	22	(Italy) Vittorio Zoboli	1, 3
(Germany) Wieth Racing	Ferrari 550 GTS	Ferrari F133 6.0 L V12	D	22	(Italy) Paolo Biglieri	1
(Germany) Wieth Racing	Ferrari 550 GTS	Ferrari F133 6.0 L V12	D	22	(Spain) Miguel Ángel de Castro	2
(Germany) Wieth Racing	Ferrari 550 GTS	Ferrari F133 6.0 L V12	D	22	(United Kingdom) Mark Mayall	6
(Germany) Wieth Racing	Ferrari 550 GTS	Ferrari F133 6.0 L V12	D	22	(United Kingdom) Rob Croydon	6
(France) DAMS	Lamborghini Murciélago R-GT	Lamborghini 6.0 L V12	M	24	(Italy) Andrea Piccini	8–10
(France) DAMS	Lamborghini Murciélago R-GT	Lamborghini 6.0 L V12	M	24	(Switzerland) Jean-Denis Délétraz	8–10
(France) DAMS	Lamborghini Murciélago R-GT	Lamborghini 6.0 L V12	M	24	(Switzerland) Neel Jani	10
(France) DAMS	Lamborghini Murciélago R-GT	Lamborghini 6.0 L V12	M	24	(Hong Kong) Philip Ma	11
(France) DAMS	Lamborghini Murciélago R-GT	Lamborghini 6.0 L V12	M	24	(Hong Kong) Samson Chan	11
(France) DAMS	Lamborghini Murciélago R-GT	Lamborghini 6.0 L V12	M	24	(China) Michael Choi Koon Ming	11
(France) DAMS	Lamborghini Murciélago R-GT	Lamborghini 6.0 L V12	M	26	(Italy) Beppe Gabbiani	8–10
(France) DAMS	Lamborghini Murciélago R-GT	Lamborghini 6.0 L V12	M	26	(Bolivia) Filipe Ortiz	8–10
(France) DAMS	Lamborghini Murciélago R-GT	Lamborghini 6.0 L V12	M	26	(Italy) Andrea Piccini	11
(France) DAMS	Lamborghini Murciélago R-GT	Lamborghini 6.0 L V12	M	26	(Switzerland) Jean-Denis Délétraz	11
(United Kingdom) Creation Autosportif	Lister Storm GTM	Jaguar 7.0 L V12	D	27	(United Kingdom) Jamie Campbell-Walter	1–8
(United Kingdom) Creation Autosportif	Lister Storm GTM	Jaguar 7.0 L V12	D	27	(United Kingdom) Jamie Derbyshire	1–8
(United Kingdom) Creation Autosportif	Lister Storm GTM	Jaguar 7.0 L V12	D	27	(United Kingdom) Bobby Verdon-Roe	6–7
(United Kingdom) Creation Autosportif	Lister Storm GTM	Jaguar 7.0 L V12	D	27	(United Kingdom) Peter Snowdon	7
(United Kingdom) Graham Nash Motorsport	Saleen S7-R	Ford 6.9 L V8	D	28	(Italy) Paolo Ruberti	All
(United Kingdom) Graham Nash Motorsport	Saleen S7-R	Ford 6.9 L V8	D	28	(Spain) Jesús Diez de Villaroel	1–3
(United Kingdom) Graham Nash Motorsport	Saleen S7-R	Ford 6.9 L V8	D	28	(Germany) Harald Becker	1
(United Kingdom) Graham Nash Motorsport	Saleen S7-R	Ford 6.9 L V8	D	28	(Italy) Gabriele Lancieri	2, 4–5, 8, 10
(United Kingdom) Graham Nash Motorsport	Saleen S7-R	Ford 6.9 L V8	D	28	(Italy) Luca Pirri	3, 8, 11
(United Kingdom) Graham Nash Motorsport	Saleen S7-R	Ford 6.9 L V8	D	28	(Germany) Wolfgang Kaufmann	4, 9
(United Kingdom) Graham Nash Motorsport	Saleen S7-R	Ford 6.9 L V8	D	28	(Belgium) Anthony Kumpen	5
(United Kingdom) Graham Nash Motorsport	Saleen S7-R	Ford 6.9 L V8	D	28	(United Kingdom) David Leslie	6
(United Kingdom) Graham Nash Motorsport	Saleen S7-R	Ford 6.9 L V8	D	28	(United Kingdom) Paul Whight	6
(United Kingdom) Graham Nash Motorsport	Saleen S7-R	Ford 6.9 L V8	D	28	(Russia) Sergey Zlobin	7
(United Kingdom) Graham Nash Motorsport	Saleen S7-R	Ford 6.9 L V8	D	28	(Belgium) Christophe Geoffroy	7
(United Kingdom) Graham Nash Motorsport	Saleen S7-R	Ford 6.9 L V8	D	28	(Italy) Gian Maria Gabbiani	7
(United Kingdom) Graham Nash Motorsport	Saleen S7-R	Ford 6.9 L V8	D	28	(United Kingdom) Jamie Wall	9
(United Kingdom) Graham Nash Motorsport	Saleen S7-R	Ford 6.9 L V8	D	28	(Italy) Rocky Agusta	10–11
(Germany) Reiter Engineering	Lamborghini Murciélago R-GT	Lamborghini 6.0 L V12	M	29	(United Kingdom) Oliver Gavin	2
(Germany) Reiter Engineering	Lamborghini Murciélago R-GT	Lamborghini 6.0 L V12	M	29	(Netherlands) Peter Kox	2
(France) Force One Racing Festina	Chrysler Viper GTS-R	Chrysler 356-T6 8.0 L V10	P	32	(Switzerland) François Labhardt	7
(France) Force One Racing Festina	Chrysler Viper GTS-R	Chrysler 356-T6 8.0 L V10	P	32	(France) Julien Gilbert	7
(France) Force One Racing Festina	Chrysler Viper GTS-R	Chrysler 356-T6 8.0 L V10	P	32	(France) François Jakubowski	7
(France) Force One Racing Festina	Chrysler Viper GTS-R	Chrysler 356-T6 8.0 L V10	P	32	(France) Philippe Alliot	7
(Italy) AF Corse (Note: AF Corse's Maserati MC12s were not approved for homologation when they entered the series; this homologation was later approved prior to Round 11. The team and drivers were therefore ineligible to score championship points until Round 11.)	Maserati MC12 GT1	Maserati 6.0 L V12	P	33	(Italy) Andrea Bertolini	8–11
(Italy) AF Corse	Maserati MC12 GT1	Maserati 6.0 L V12	P	33	(Finland) Mika Salo	8–11
(Italy) AF Corse	Maserati MC12 GT1	Maserati 6.0 L V12	P	34	(Italy) Fabrizio de Simone	8–11
(Italy) AF Corse	Maserati MC12 GT1	Maserati 6.0 L V12	P	34	(United Kingdom) Johnny Herbert	8–11
(Italy) Scuderia Veregra	Chrysler Viper GTS-R	Chrysler 8.0 L V10	P	35	(Italy) Valerio Scarsellati	8
(Italy) Scuderia Veregra	Chrysler Viper GTS-R	Chrysler 8.0 L V10	P	35	(Italy) Angelo Lancelotti	8
(Italy) Scuderia Veregra	Chrysler Viper GTS-R	Chrysler 8.0 L V10	P	35	(Italy) "Base Up"	8
(Italy) Scuderia Veregra	Chrysler Viper GTS-R	Chrysler 8.0 L V10	P	35	(France) Anthony Beltoise	10
(Italy) Scuderia Veregra	Chrysler Viper GTS-R	Chrysler 8.0 L V10	P	35	(India) Narain Karthikeyan	10
(Italy) Scuderia Veregra	Chrysler Viper GTS-R	Chrysler 8.0 L V10	P	35	(United Arab Emirates) Maktoum Hasher Al Maktoum	10
(Italy) Scuderia Veregra	Chrysler Viper GTS-R	Chrysler 8.0 L V10	P	35	(France) Marco Saviozzi	11
(Italy) Scuderia Veregra	Chrysler Viper GTS-R	Chrysler 8.0 L V10	P	35	(France) David Terrien	11
(Italy) Scuderia Veregra	Chrysler Viper GTS-R	Chrysler 8.0 L V10	P	35	(France) Jean-Yves Mallat	11

=== N-GT ===
Entrant	Car	Engine	Tyre	No.	Drivers	Rounds
(Germany) Yukos Freisinger Motorsport	Porsche 911 GT3-RSR	Porsche 3.6 L Flat-6	M	50	(Monaco) Stéphane Ortelli	All
(Germany) Yukos Freisinger Motorsport	Porsche 911 GT3-RSR	Porsche 3.6 L Flat-6	M	50	(France) Emmanuel Collard	All
(Germany) Yukos Freisinger Motorsport	Porsche 911 GT3-RSR	Porsche 3.6 L Flat-6	M	50	(France) Romain Dumas	7
(Germany) Yukos Freisinger Motorsport	Porsche 911 GT3-RSR	Porsche 3.6 L Flat-6	M	77	(Russia) Aleksey Vasilyev	All
(Germany) Yukos Freisinger Motorsport	Porsche 911 GT3-RSR	Porsche 3.6 L Flat-6	M	77	(Russia) Nikolai Fomenko	1–6, 9–11
(Germany) Yukos Freisinger Motorsport	Porsche 911 GT3-RSR	Porsche 3.6 L Flat-6	M	77	(Germany) Jörg Bergmeister	7–8
(Germany) Yukos Freisinger Motorsport	Porsche 911 GT3-RSR	Porsche 3.6 L Flat-6	M	77	(Germany) Timo Bernhard	7
(Germany) Freisinger Motorsport	Porsche 911 GT3-RSR	Porsche 3.6 L Flat-6	M	99	(Germany) Sascha Maassen	All
(Germany) Freisinger Motorsport	Porsche 911 GT3-RSR	Porsche 3.6 L Flat-6	M	99	(Germany) Lucas Luhr	All
(Germany) Freisinger Motorsport	Porsche 911 GT3-RSR	Porsche 3.6 L Flat-6	M	99	(Germany) Marc Lieb	7
(Italy) AB Motorsport	Porsche 911 GT3-RS	Porsche 3.6 L Flat-6	D	56	(Italy) Bruno Barbaro	1, 3–4, 8
(Italy) AB Motorsport	Porsche 911 GT3-RS	Porsche 3.6 L Flat-6	D	56	(Italy) Antonio De Castro	1, 3–4, 8
(Italy) AB Motorsport	Porsche 911 GT3-RS	Porsche 3.6 L Flat-6	D	56	(Italy) Renato Premoli	1, 3–4, 8
(Czech Republic) Vonka Racing	Porsche 911 GT3-R	Porsche 3.6 L Flat-6	P	57	(Czech Republic) Jan Vonka	2–5, 8–11
(Czech Republic) Vonka Racing	Porsche 911 GT3-R	Porsche 3.6 L Flat-6	P	57	(Slovakia) Miroslav Konôpka	2, 5, 10–11
(Czech Republic) Vonka Racing	Porsche 911 GT3-R	Porsche 3.6 L Flat-6	P	57	(Italy) Mauro Casadei	3–4, 9
(Czech Republic) Vonka Racing	Porsche 911 GT3-R	Porsche 3.6 L Flat-6	P	57	(Italy) Marco Panzavuota	8
(Czech Republic) Vonka Racing	Porsche 911 GT3-R	Porsche 3.6 L Flat-6	P	57	(Italy) Massimiliano Degiovanni	8
(Spain) Darro Motor Racing	Ferrari 360 Modena N-GT	Ferrari 3.6 L V8	P	58	(Spain) Gines Vivancos	2
(Spain) Darro Motor Racing	Ferrari 360 Modena N-GT	Ferrari 3.6 L V8	P	58	(Spain) Luis Miguel Reyes	2
(Germany) JP Racing	Porsche 911 GT3-RS	Porsche 3.6 L Flat-6	D	59	(Germany) Jens Petersen	3–4, 6, 8–9
(Germany) JP Racing	Porsche 911 GT3-RS	Porsche 3.6 L Flat-6	D	59	(Germany) Jan-Dirk Lueders	3–4, 6, 8–9
(Germany) JP Racing	Porsche 911 GT3-RS	Porsche 3.6 L Flat-6	D	59	(Germany) Oliver Mathai	3, 6, 8
(Germany) JP Racing	Porsche 911 GT3-RS	Porsche 3.6 L Flat-6	D	59	(Germany) Kersten Jodexnis	4, 9
(Slovakia) Machánek Racing	Porsche 911 GT3-RS; Porsche 911 GT3-RSR	Porsche 3.6 L Flat-6	D	60	(Slovakia) Rudolf Machánek	5
(Slovakia) Machánek Racing	Porsche 911 GT3-RS; Porsche 911 GT3-RSR	Porsche 3.6 L Flat-6	D	60	(Czech Republic) Jaroslav Honzík	5
(Slovakia) Machánek Racing	Porsche 911 GT3-RS; Porsche 911 GT3-RSR	Porsche 3.6 L Flat-6	D	61	(Czech Republic) Josef Venč	5
(Slovakia) Machánek Racing	Porsche 911 GT3-RS; Porsche 911 GT3-RSR	Porsche 3.6 L Flat-6	D	61	(Hungary) Istvan Racz	5
(Italy) GPC Giesse Squadra Corse	Ferrari 360 Modena N-GT; Ferrari 360 Modena GTC	Ferrari 3.6 L V8	P	62	(Italy) Christian Pescatori	All
(Italy) GPC Giesse Squadra Corse	Ferrari 360 Modena N-GT; Ferrari 360 Modena GTC	Ferrari 3.6 L V8	P	62	(Italy) Fabrizio de Simone	1–7
(Italy) GPC Giesse Squadra Corse	Ferrari 360 Modena N-GT; Ferrari 360 Modena GTC	Ferrari 3.6 L V8	P	62	(Italy) Andrea Bertolini	7
(Italy) GPC Giesse Squadra Corse	Ferrari 360 Modena N-GT; Ferrari 360 Modena GTC	Ferrari 3.6 L V8	P	62	(Switzerland) Iradj Alexander	8
(Italy) GPC Giesse Squadra Corse	Ferrari 360 Modena N-GT; Ferrari 360 Modena GTC	Ferrari 3.6 L V8	P	62	(Belgium) Vincent Vosse	9
(Italy) GPC Giesse Squadra Corse	Ferrari 360 Modena N-GT; Ferrari 360 Modena GTC	Ferrari 3.6 L V8	P	62	(Brazil) Jaime Melo	10–11
(Italy) GPC Giesse Squadra Corse	Ferrari 360 Modena N-GT; Ferrari 360 Modena GTC	Ferrari 3.6 L V8	P	64	(Italy) Luca Drudi	10
(Italy) GPC Giesse Squadra Corse	Ferrari 360 Modena N-GT; Ferrari 360 Modena GTC	Ferrari 3.6 L V8	P	64	(Italy) Marco Lambertini	10
(Italy) GPC Giesse Squadra Corse	Ferrari 360 Modena N-GT; Ferrari 360 Modena GTC	Ferrari 3.6 L V8	P	64	(Belgium) Vincent Vosse	10
(Italy) GPC Giesse Squadra Corse	Ferrari 360 Modena N-GT; Ferrari 360 Modena GTC	Ferrari 3.6 L V8	P	64	(Hong Kong) Matthew Marsh	11
(Italy) GPC Giesse Squadra Corse	Ferrari 360 Modena N-GT; Ferrari 360 Modena GTC	Ferrari 3.6 L V8	P	64	(Hong Kong) Charles Kwan	11
(Germany) JVG Racing	Porsche 911 GT3-RS	Porsche 3.6 L Flat-6	D	63	(Austria) Horst Felbermayr	5
(Germany) JVG Racing	Porsche 911 GT3-RS	Porsche 3.6 L Flat-6	D	63	(Austria) Horst Felbermayr Jr.	5
(United Kingdom) Scuderia Ecosse	Ferrari 360 Modena GTC	Ferrari 3.6 L V8	P	65	(United Kingdom) Andrew Kirkaldy	6
(United Kingdom) Scuderia Ecosse	Ferrari 360 Modena GTC	Ferrari 3.6 L V8	P	65	(United Kingdom) Nathan Kinch	6
(Italy) Autorlando Sport	Porsche 911 GT3-RSR	Porsche 3.6 L Flat-6	P	66	(Italy) Luigi Moccia	7
(Italy) Autorlando Sport	Porsche 911 GT3-RSR	Porsche 3.6 L Flat-6	P	66	(Italy) Morendo Soli	7
(Italy) Autorlando Sport	Porsche 911 GT3-RSR	Porsche 3.6 L Flat-6	P	66	(Italy) Franco Groppi	7
(Italy) Autorlando Sport	Porsche 911 GT3-RSR	Porsche 3.6 L Flat-6	P	66	(United States) Liz Halliday	7
(Germany) Proton Competition	Porsche 911 GT3-RS	Porsche 3.6 L Flat-6	D	68	(Austria) Horst Felbermayr	10–11
(Germany) Proton Competition	Porsche 911 GT3-RS	Porsche 3.6 L Flat-6	D	68	(Austria) Horst Felbermayr Jr.	10–11
(Germany) Proton Competition	Porsche 911 GT3-RS	Porsche 3.6 L Flat-6	D	69	(Germany) Christian Ried	All
(Germany) Proton Competition	Porsche 911 GT3-RS	Porsche 3.6 L Flat-6	D	69	(Germany) Gerold Ried	All
(Germany) Proton Competition	Porsche 911 GT3-RS	Porsche 3.6 L Flat-6	D	69	(Poland) Maciej Marcinkiewicz	1–2, 5, 9
(Germany) Proton Competition	Porsche 911 GT3-RS	Porsche 3.6 L Flat-6	D	69	(Austria) Horst Felbermayr	7
(Germany) Proton Competition	Porsche 911 GT3-RS	Porsche 3.6 L Flat-6	D	69	(Austria) Horst Felbermayr Jr.	7
(United Kingdom) Graham Nash Motorsport	Porsche 911 GT3-R	Porsche 3.6 L Flat-6	D	70	(Italy) Edy Gay	7
(United Kingdom) Graham Nash Motorsport	Porsche 911 GT3-R	Porsche 3.6 L Flat-6	D	70	(Belgium) Armand Fumal	7
(United Kingdom) Graham Nash Motorsport	Porsche 911 GT3-R	Porsche 3.6 L Flat-6	D	70	(Belgium) Steve Van Bellingen	7
(United Kingdom) Graham Nash Motorsport	Porsche 911 GT3-R	Porsche 3.6 L Flat-6	D	70	(France) Michel Orts	7
(United Kingdom) Graham Nash Motorsport	Porsche 911 GT3-R	Porsche 3.6 L Flat-6	D	70	(United Kingdom) Rob Croydon	10
(United Kingdom) Graham Nash Motorsport	Porsche 911 GT3-R	Porsche 3.6 L Flat-6	D	70	(United Kingdom) Del Bennett	10
(United Kingdom) Graham Nash Motorsport	Porsche 911 GT3-R	Porsche 3.6 L Flat-6	D	70	(United Kingdom) David Ovey	10
(United Kingdom) Graham Nash Motorsport	Porsche 911 GT3-R	Porsche 3.6 L Flat-6	D	70	(United Kingdom) Stephen Stokoe	11
(United Kingdom) Graham Nash Motorsport	Porsche 911 GT3-R	Porsche 3.6 L Flat-6	D	70	(United Kingdom) Ken McAlpine	11
(United Kingdom) Graham Nash Motorsport	Porsche 911 GT3-R	Porsche 3.6 L Flat-6	D	70	(United States) Ben Orcutt	11
(United Kingdom) JWR	Porsche 911 GT3-RS	Porsche 3.6 L Flat-6	D	71	(United Kingdom) Mike Jordan	6–7
(United Kingdom) JWR	Porsche 911 GT3-RS	Porsche 3.6 L Flat-6	D	71	(United Kingdom) David Warnock	6
(United Kingdom) JWR	Porsche 911 GT3-RS	Porsche 3.6 L Flat-6	D	71	(United Kingdom) Godfrey Jones	7
(United Kingdom) JWR	Porsche 911 GT3-RS	Porsche 3.6 L Flat-6	D	71	(United Kingdom) David Jones	7
(United Kingdom) Cirtek Motorsport	Ferrari 360 Modena GTC	Ferrari 3.6 L V8	D	72	(United Kingdom) Frank Mountain	7
(United Kingdom) Cirtek Motorsport	Ferrari 360 Modena GTC	Ferrari 3.6 L V8	D	72	(New Zealand) Rob Wilson	7
(United Kingdom) Cirtek Motorsport	Ferrari 360 Modena GTC	Ferrari 3.6 L V8	D	72	(Italy) Maurizio Fabris	7
(United Kingdom) Cirtek Motorsport	Ferrari 360 Modena GTC	Ferrari 3.6 L V8	D	72	(Saudi Arabia) Karim Ojjeh	7
(United Kingdom) Cirtek Motorsport	Porsche 911 GT3-RS	Porsche 3.6 L Flat-6	D	73	(United Kingdom) Adam Jones	7–8
(United Kingdom) Cirtek Motorsport	Porsche 911 GT3-RS	Porsche 3.6 L Flat-6	D	73	(Russia) Nikolai Fomenko	7–8
(United Kingdom) Cirtek Motorsport	Porsche 911 GT3-RS	Porsche 3.6 L Flat-6	D	73	(United Kingdom) John Grant	7
(United Kingdom) Cirtek Motorsport	Porsche 911 GT3-RS	Porsche 3.6 L Flat-6	D	73	(United States) Vic Rice	7
(Germany) Seikel Motorsport	Porsche 911 GT3-RS	Porsche 3.6 L Flat-6	Y	75	(Italy) Alex Caffi	7
(Germany) Seikel Motorsport	Porsche 911 GT3-RS	Porsche 3.6 L Flat-6	Y	75	(Italy) Luca Drudi	7
(Germany) Seikel Motorsport	Porsche 911 GT3-RS	Porsche 3.6 L Flat-6	Y	75	(Italy) Gabrio Rosa	7
(Germany) Seikel Motorsport	Porsche 911 GT3-RS	Porsche 3.6 L Flat-6	Y	75	(United Kingdom) Robin Liddell	7
(United Kingdom) RJN Motorsport	Nissan 350Z	Nissan 3.5 L V6	D	85	(New Zealand) Neil Cunningham	7, 11
(United Kingdom) RJN Motorsport	Nissan 350Z	Nissan 3.5 L V6	D	85	(United Kingdom) Chris Buncombe	7
(United Kingdom) RJN Motorsport	Nissan 350Z	Nissan 3.5 L V6	D	85	(Sweden) Carl Rosenblad	7
(United Kingdom) RJN Motorsport	Nissan 350Z	Nissan 3.5 L V6	D	85	(Belgium) Vincent Radermecker	7
(United Kingdom) RJN Motorsport	Nissan 350Z	Nissan 3.5 L V6	D	85	(United Kingdom) Ben Collins	11
(Italy) MIK Corse	Ferrari 360 Modena GTC	Ferrari 3.6 L V8	P	87	(Italy) Alessandro Piccolo	8
(Italy) MIK Corse	Ferrari 360 Modena GTC	Ferrari 3.6 L V8	P	87	(Italy) Giovanni Berton	8
(United Kingdom) GruppeM Europe	Porsche 911 GT3-RSR	Porsche 3.6 L Flat-6	D	88	(United Kingdom) Tim Mullen	6–7
(United Kingdom) GruppeM Europe	Porsche 911 GT3-RSR	Porsche 3.6 L Flat-6	D	88	(United Kingdom) Jonny Cocker	6–7
(United Kingdom) GruppeM Europe	Porsche 911 GT3-RSR	Porsche 3.6 L Flat-6	D	88	(United Kingdom) Tim Sugden	7, 10–11
(United Kingdom) GruppeM Europe	Porsche 911 GT3-RSR	Porsche 3.6 L Flat-6	D	88	(United Kingdom) Warren Hughes	7
(United Kingdom) GruppeM Europe	Porsche 911 GT3-RSR	Porsche 3.6 L Flat-6	D	88	(Germany) Marc Lieb	10–11
(Italy) Scuderia Veregra	Porsche 911 GT3-RS	Porsche 3.6 L Flat-6	P	89	(Italy) Beppe Orlandi	8
(Italy) Scuderia Veregra	Porsche 911 GT3-RS	Porsche 3.6 L Flat-6	P	89	(Italy) Roberto Castagna	8

== Season results ==
Overall winners in bold.

Rnd	Circuit	GT Winning Team	N-GT Winning Team	Results
Rnd	Circuit	GT Winning Drivers	N-GT Winning Drivers	Results
1	Monza	**(Italy) #2 BMS Scuderia Italia**	(Germany) #50 Yukos Freisinger	Results
1	Monza	(Italy) **Fabrizio Gollin** (Italy) **Luca Cappellari**	(Monaco) Stéphane Ortelli (France) Emmanuel Collard	Results
2	Valencia	**(Italy) #2 BMS Scuderia Italia**	(Germany) #99 Freisinger Motorsport	Results
2	Valencia	(Italy) **Fabrizio Gollin** (Italy) **Luca Cappellari**	(Germany) Lucas Luhr (Germany) Sascha Maassen	Results
3	Magny-Cours	**(Germany) #5 Vitaphone Racing Team**	(Germany) #99 Freisinger Motorsport	Results
3	Magny-Cours	(Germany) **Michael Bartels** (Germany) **Uwe Alzen**	(Germany) Lucas Luhr (Germany) Sascha Maassen	Results
4	Hockenheimring	**(Italy) #1 BMS Scuderia Italia**	(Germany) #99 Freisinger Motorsport	Results
4	Hockenheimring	(Italy) **Matteo Bobbi** (Switzerland) **Gabriele Gardel**	(Germany) Lucas Luhr (Germany) Sascha Maassen	Results
5	Brno	**(Germany) #5 Vitaphone Racing Team**	(Italy) #62 G.P.C. Giesse	Results
5	Brno	(Germany) **Michael Bartels** (Germany) **Uwe Alzen**	(Italy) Christian Pescatori (Italy) Fabrizio De Simone	Results
6	Donington	**(Monaco) #17 JMB Racing**	(Germany) #50 Yukos Freisinger	Results
6	Donington	(Brazil) **Jaime Melo** (Austria) **Karl Wendlinger**	(Monaco) Stéphane Ortelli (France) Emmanuel Collard	Results
7	Spa	**(Italy) #2 BMS Scuderia Italia**	(Germany) #50 Yukos Freisinger	Results
7	Spa	(Italy) **Fabrizio Gollin** (Italy) **Luca Cappellari** (Switzerland) **Enzo Calderari** (Switzerland) **Lilian Bryner**	(Monaco) Stéphane Ortelli (France) Emmanuel Collard (France) Romain Dumas	Results
8	Imola	**(Germany) #5 Vitaphone Racing Team**	(Germany) #99 Freisinger Motorsport	Results
8	Imola	(Germany) **Michael Bartels** (Germany) **Uwe Alzen**	(Germany) Lucas Luhr (Germany) Sascha Maassen	Results
9	Oschersleben	**(Italy) #33 AF Corse**	(Germany) #99 Freisinger Motorsport	Results
9	Oschersleben	(Finland) **Mika Salo** (Italy) **Andrea Bertolini**	(Germany) Lucas Luhr (Germany) Sascha Maassen	Results
10	Dubai	**(Italy) #1 BMS Scuderia Italia**	(Germany) #99 Freisinger Motorsport	Results
10	Dubai	(Italy) **Matteo Bobbi** (Switzerland) **Gabriele Gardel**	(Germany) Lucas Luhr (Germany) Sascha Maassen	Results
11	Zhuhai	**(Italy) #33 AF Corse**	(Italy) #62 G.P.C. Giesse	Results
11	Zhuhai	(Finland) **Mika Salo** (Italy) **Andrea Bertolini**	(Italy) Christian Pescatori (Brazil) Jaime Melo	Results

== Drivers Championship ==
=== GT standings ===
The GT Drivers Championship was won jointly by Luca Cappellari and Fabrizio Gollin who shared a Ferrari 550 Maranello entered by BMS Scuderia Italia.

Pos.	Driver	Team	MON (Italy)	VAL (Spain)	MAG (France)	HOC (Germany)	BRN (Czech Republic)	DON (United Kingdom)	SPA (Belgium)			IMO (Italy)	OSC (Germany)	DUB (United Arab Emirates)	ZHU (China)	Total points
Pos.	Driver	Team	MON (Italy)	VAL (Spain)	MAG (France)	HOC (Germany)	BRN (Czech Republic)	DON (United Kingdom)	6H	12H	24H	IMO (Italy)	OSC (Germany)	DUB (United Arab Emirates)	ZHU (China)	Total points
1	(Italy) Luca Cappellari	(Italy) BMS Scuderia Italia	1	1	3	2	3	5	3	1	1	2	1	4		85
1	(Italy) Fabrizio Gollin	(Italy) BMS Scuderia Italia	1	1	3	2	3	5	3	1	1	2	1	4		85
2	(Italy) Matteo Bobbi	(Italy) BMS Scuderia Italia	2	2	4	1	11	4	2	4	3	4	4	1	3	74.5
2	(Switzerland) Gabriele Gardel	(Italy) BMS Scuderia Italia	2	2	4	1	11	4	2	4	3	4	4	1	3	74.5
3	(Switzerland) Enzo Calderari	(United Kingdom) Care Racing	5	Ret	Ret	3	7	7				3	5	2	4	55
3	(Switzerland) Enzo Calderari	(Italy) BMS Scuderia Italia							3	1	1					55
3	(Switzerland) Lilian Bryner	(United Kingdom) Care Racing	5	Ret	Ret	3	7	7				3	5	2	4	55
3	(Switzerland) Lilian Bryner	(Italy) BMS Scuderia Italia							3	1	1					55
4	(Italy) Fabio Babini	(Italy) GPC Giesse Squadra Corse	3	Ret	6	6	4	3	1	2	2	5	7	5	8	51
5	(Austria) Karl Wendlinger	(Monaco) JMB Racing	Ret	4	2	11	2	1	8	5	4	7	3	Ret	5	50.5
6	(Austria) Philipp Peter	(Italy) GPC Giesse Squadra Corse	3	Ret	6	6	4	3	1	2	2	5	7	9	6	49
7	(Germany) Michael Bartels	(Germany) Vitaphone Racing Team	Ret	Ret	1	13	1	2	Ret	Ret	Ret	1	14	3	Ret	44
7	(Germany) Uwe Alzen	(Germany) Vitaphone Racing Team	Ret	Ret	1	13	1	2	Ret	Ret	Ret	1	14	3	Ret	44
8	(Italy) Stefano Livio	(United Kingdom) Care Racing	5	Ret	Ret	3	7	7				3	5			36.5
8	(Italy) Stefano Livio	(Italy) BMS Scuderia Italia							2	4	3					36.5
9	(Finland) Mika Salo	(Italy) GPC Giesse Squadra Corse							1	2	2					27
9	(Finland) Mika Salo	(Italy) AF Corse										NC	NC	Ret	1	27
10	(Italy) Emanuele Naspetti	(Italy) GPC Giesse Squadra Corse	4	Ret	13	5	Ret	6	10	9	6	6	Ret	9	6	21
11	(Brazil) Jaime Melo	(Monaco) JMB Racing					2	1				7				20
12	(Belgium) Vincent Vosse	(Italy) GPC Giesse Squadra Corse							1	2	2					17
13	(United Kingdom) Jamie Campbell-Walter	(United Kingdom) Creation Autosportif	Ret	5	7	4	5	15	9	7	Ret	Ret				16
13	(United Kingdom) Jamie Derbyshire	(United Kingdom) Creation Autosportif	Ret	5	7	4	5	15	9	7	Ret	Ret				16
14	(United Kingdom) Chris Goodwin	(United Kingdom) RML	8	10	10	8	13	9	4	8	Ret	Ret	2	Ret	7	15
15	(Austria) Robert Lechner	(Monaco) JMB Racing	Ret	4	2	11	8									14
16	(Italy) Gianni Morbidelli	(Italy) GPC Giesse Squadra Corse						6	10	9	6	6	Ret	5	8	14
17	(United Kingdom) Mike Newton	(United Kingdom) RML	9	6	Ret	Ret	12	8	4	8	Ret	8	6	6	12	14
17	(Brazil) Thomas Erdos	(United Kingdom) RML	9	6	Ret	Ret	12	8	4	8	Ret	8	6	6	12	14
18	(Belgium) Bert Longin	(Monaco) JMB Racing	7	7	Ret	9	8	10	8	5	4	11	8	13	9	13.5
19	(Austria) Toto Wolff	(Monaco) JMB Racing	Ret	4	2	11										13
20	(Spain) Miguel Ángel de Castro	(Germany) Wieth Racing		Ret												12.5
20	(Spain) Miguel Ángel de Castro	(Italy) BMS Scuderia Italia							2	4	3					12.5
21	(France) Christophe Bouchut	(Netherlands) Zwaans GTR Racing Team	6	9	8	7						13				11
21	(France) Christophe Bouchut	(United Kingdom) Care Racing													4	11
22	(Italy) Andrea Bertolini	(Italy) AF Corse										NC	NC	Ret	1	10
23	(Brazil) Tarso Marques	(Monaco) JMB Racing											3	Ret	5	10
24	(Netherlands) Mike Hezemans	(Italy) GPC Giesse Squadra Corse	4	Ret	13	5	Ret									9
25	(Italy) Fabrizio de Simone	(Italy) AF Corse										NC	NC	NC	2	8
25	(United Kingdom) Johnny Herbert	(Italy) AF Corse										NC	NC	NC	2	8
26	(Portugal) José Pedro Fontes	(United Kingdom) RML											2	Ret		8
26	(Italy) Thomas Biagi	(United Kingdom) Care Racing												2		8
27	(Germany) Alex Müller	(Monaco) JMB Racing							8	5	4					7.5
27	(Belgium) Pierre-Yves Corthals	(Monaco) JMB Racing							8	5	4					7.5
28	(Switzerland) Toni Seiler	(Germany) Konrad Motorsport	Ret	11	5	Ret	6	14	Ret	Ret	Ret	Ret	13	12		7
29	(United Kingdom) Oliver Gavin	(Germany) Reiter Engineering		3												6
29	(Netherlands) Peter Kox	(Germany) Reiter Engineering		3												6
30	(Netherlands) Arjan van der Zwaan	(Netherlands) Zwaans GTR Racing Team	6	9	8	7	9	11	Ret	Ret	Ret					6
31	(France) Philippe Alliot	(France) Force One Racing Festina							12	6	5					5.5
31	(France) Julien Gilbert	(France) Force One Racing Festina							12	6	5					5.5
31	(France) François Jakubowski	(France) Force One Racing Festina							12	6	5					5.5
31	(Switzerland) François Labhardt	(France) Force One Racing Festina							12	6	5					5.5
32	(Italy) Andrea Garbagnati	(Monaco) JMB		8				12						8		5.5
32	(Italy) Andrea Garbagnati	(Monaco) JMB Racing							6	10	NC					5.5
33	(United Kingdom) Ian Khan	(Monaco) JMB Racing	7	7	Ret	9	8									5
34	(Belgium) Stéphane Lémeret	(Netherlands) Zwaans GTR Racing Team							5	3	Ret					5
34	(Belgium) Marc Duez	(Netherlands) Zwaans GTR Racing Team							5	3	Ret					5
34	(Belgium) Fanny Duchâteau	(Netherlands) Zwaans GTR Racing Team							5	3	Ret					5
34	(Belgium) Loïc Deman	(Netherlands) Zwaans GTR Racing Team							5	3	Ret					5
35	(Netherlands) Peter Kutemann	(Monaco) JMB	Ret		11	10	14					9	11	8	11	4.5
35	(Netherlands) Peter Kutemann	(Monaco) JMB Racing							6	10	NC					4.5
36	(France) Antoine Gosse	(Monaco) JMB	Ret	8	11	10	14	12				9	11			4.5
36	(France) Antoine Gosse	(Monaco) JMB Racing							6	10	NC					4.5
37	(Austria) Walter Lechner Jr.	(Germany) Konrad Motorsport	Ret	11	5	Ret			Ret	Ret	Ret	Ret	13	12	Ret	4
38	(Switzerland) Iradj Alexander	(Monaco) JMB Racing													5	4
39	(Portugal) Miguel Ramos	(United Kingdom) RML	8	10	10		13	9	4	8	Ret	Ret				4
40	(Germany) Harald Becker	(United Kingdom) Graham Nash Motorsport	10													3
40	(Germany) Harald Becker	(Germany) Konrad Motorsport					6	14								3
41	(Austria) Franz Konrad	(Germany) Konrad Motorsport	Ret	11		Ret	6					Ret			Ret	3
41	(Austria) Franz Konrad	(Germany) Vitaphone Racing Team							Ret	Ret	Ret					3
42	(Belgium) Marc Goossens	(Netherlands) Zwaans GTR Racing Team	6													3
42	(Belgium) Didier Defourny	(Italy) GPC Giesse Squadra Corse							10	9	6					3
42	(Belgium) Frédéric Bouvy	(Italy) GPC Giesse Squadra Corse							10	9	6					3
43	(Sweden) Henrik Roos	(Netherlands) Zwaans GTR Racing Team			8	7	9	11					10	11		3
44	(Italy) Paolo Ruberti	(United Kingdom) Graham Nash Motorsport	10	12	NC	Ret	10	12	11	Ret	Ret	10	9	7	Ret	2
45	(Austria) Thomas Bleiner	(Monaco) JMB Racing		7	Ret	9										2
46	(Italy) Gabriele Lancieri	(United Kingdom) Graham Nash Motorsport		12		Ret	10					10		7		2
47	(France) Christophe Pillon	(Monaco) JMB Racing	7													2
47	(Italy) Rocky Agusta	(United Kingdom) Graham Nash Motorsport												7	Ret	2
47	(United Kingdom) Michael Mallock	(United Kingdom) RML							Ret	Ret	Ret				7	2
48	(France) Stéphane Daoudi	(Monaco) JMB	Ret	8	11	10	14						11	8	11	2
49	(United Kingdom) Chris Buncombe	(Monaco) JMB Racing										11	8	13	9	1
50	(Russia) Sergey Zlobin	(United Kingdom) Graham Nash Motorsport							11	Ret	Ret					1
50	(Russia) Sergey Zlobin	(Monaco) JMB Racing										11	8	13		1
51	(Portugal) João Barbosa	(United Kingdom) RML				8										1
52	(United Kingdom) Bobby Verdon-Roe	(United Kingdom) Creation Autosportif						15	9	7	Ret					1
53	(United Kingdom) Peter Snowdon	(United Kingdom) Creation Autosportif							9	7	Ret					1
53	(United Kingdom) Gregor Fisken	(United Kingdom) Lister Racing							7	Ret	Ret					1
53	(United Kingdom) Ian Donaldson	(United Kingdom) Lister Racing							7	Ret	Ret					1
53	(United Kingdom) Robert Schirle	(United Kingdom) Lister Racing							7	Ret	Ret					1
54	(India) Narain Karthikeyan	(Italy) Scuderia Veregra												11		0
Pos.	Driver	Team	MON (Italy)	VAL (Spain)	MAG (France)	HOC (Germany)	BRN (Czech Republic)	DON (United Kingdom)	6H	12H	24H	IMO (Italy)	OSC (Germany)	DUB (United Arab Emirates)	ZHU (China)	Total points
Pos.	Driver	Team	MON (Italy)	VAL (Spain)	MAG (France)	HOC (Germany)	BRN (Czech Republic)	DON (United Kingdom)	SPA (Belgium)			IMO (Italy)	OSC (Germany)	DUB (United Arab Emirates)	ZHU (China)	Total points

Colour	Result
Gold	Winner
Silver	Second place
Bronze	Third place
Green	Points classification
Blue	Non-points classification
Blue	Non-classified finish (NC)
Purple	Retired, not classified (Ret)
Red	Did not qualify (DNQ)
Red	Did not pre-qualify (DNPQ)
Black	Disqualified (DSQ)
White	Did not start (DNS)
White	Withdrew (WD)
White	Race cancelled (C)
Blank	Did not practice (DNP)
Blank	Did not arrive (DNA)
Blank	Excluded (EX)

=== N-GT standings ===
The N-GT Drivers Championship was won jointly by Sascha Maassen and Lucas Luhr who shared a Porsche 996 GT3 RSR entered by Freisinger Motorsport.

Pos.	Driver	Team	MON (Italy)	VAL (Spain)	MAG (France)	HOC (Germany)	BRN (Czech Republic)	DON (United Kingdom)	SPA (Belgium)			IMO (Italy)	OSC (Germany)	DUB (United Arab Emirates)	ZHU (China)	Total points
Pos.	Driver	Team	MON (Italy)	VAL (Spain)	MAG (France)	HOC (Germany)	BRN (Czech Republic)	DON (United Kingdom)	6H	12H	24H	IMO (Italy)	OSC (Germany)	DUB (United Arab Emirates)	ZHU (China)	Total points
1	(Germany) Sascha Maassen	(Germany) Freisinger Motorsport	NC	1	1	1	2	2	8	3	3	1	1	1	2	93.5
1	(Germany) Lucas Luhr	(Germany) Freisinger Motorsport	NC	1	1	1	2	2	8	3	3	1	1	1	2	93.5
2	(Monaco) Stéphane Ortelli	(Germany) Yukos Freisinger Motorsport	1	3	2	2	3	1	2	2	1	2	2	2	Ret	90
2	(France) Emmanuel Collard	(Germany) Yukos Freisinger Motorsport	1	3	2	2	3	1	2	2	1	2	2	2	Ret	90
3	(Italy) Christian Pescatori	(Italy) GPC Giesse Squadra Corse	2	2	Ret	3	1	5	Ret	Ret	Ret	DSQ	3	3	1	58
4	(Russia) Aleksey Vasilyev	(Germany) Yukos Freisinger Motorsport	Ret	4	3	Ret	4	Ret	1	1	2	3	4	6	Ret	48
5	(Germany) Gerold Ried	(Germany) Proton Competition	3	5	4	4	5	8	5	7	5	7	5	7	5	44
5	(Germany) Christian Ried	(Germany) Proton Competition	3	5	4	4	5	8	5	7	5	7	5	7	5	44
6	(Italy) Fabrizio de Simone	(Italy) GPC Giesse Squadra Corse	2	2	Ret	3	1	5	Ret	Ret	Ret					36
7	(Russia) Nikolai Fomenko	(Germany) Yukos Freisinger Motorsport	Ret	4	3	Ret	4	Ret					4	6	Ret	26
7	(Russia) Nikolai Fomenko	(United Kingdom) Cirtek Motorsport							10	10	7	9				26
8	(Germany) Jörg Bergmeister	(Germany) Yukos Freisinger Motorsport							1	1	2	3				24
9	(Czech Republic) Jan Vonka	(Czech Republic) Vonka Racing		6	5	Ret	6					8	7	9	3	19
10	(France) Romain Dumas	(Germany) Yukos Freisinger Motorsport							2	2	1					18
11	(Germany) Timo Bernhard	(Germany) Yukos Freisinger Motorsport							1	1	2					18
12	(Germany) Marc Lieb	(Germany) Freisinger Motorsport							8	3	3					17.5
12	(Germany) Marc Lieb	(United Kingdom) GruppeM Europe												4	6	17.5
13	(Brazil) Jaime Melo	(Italy) GPC Giesse Squadra Corse												3	1	16
14	(United Kingdom) Tim Sugden	(United Kingdom) GruppeM Europe							3	4	Ret			4	6	13.5
15	(Slovakia) Miroslav Konôpka	(Czech Republic) Vonka Racing		6			6							9	3	12
16	(Italy) Bruno Barbaro	(Italy) AB Motorsport	4		NC	5						6				12
16	(Italy) Antonio De Castro	(Italy) AB Motorsport	4		NC	5						6				12
16	(Italy) Renato Premoli	(Italy) AB Motorsport	4		NC	5						6				12
17	(United Kingdom) Mike Jordan	(United Kingdom) JWR						6	4	6	4					12
18	(Poland) Maciej Marcinkiewicz	(Germany) Proton Competition	DNS	5			5						5			12
19	(United Kingdom) Tim Mullen	(United Kingdom) GruppeM Europe						3	3	4	Ret					11.5
19	(United Kingdom) Jonny Cocker	(United Kingdom) GruppeM Europe						3	3	4	Ret					11.5
20	(Belgium) Vincent Vosse	(Italy) GPC Giesse Squadra Corse											3	5		10
21	(Austria) Horst Felbermayr	(Germany) JVG Racing					7									10
21	(Austria) Horst Felbermayr	(Germany) Proton Competition							5	7	5			8	Ret	10
21	(Austria) Horst Felbermayr Jr.	(Germany) JVG Racing					7									10
21	(Austria) Horst Felbermayr Jr.	(Germany) Proton Competition							5	7	5			8	Ret	10
22	(United Kingdom) Godfrey Jones	(United Kingdom) JWR							4	6	4					9
22	(United Kingdom) David Jones	(United Kingdom) JWR							4	6	4					9
23	(Germany) Jens Petersen	(Germany) JP Racing			Ret	DNS		7				5	6			9
23	(Germany) Jan-Dirk Lueders	(Germany) JP Racing			Ret	DNS		7				5	6			9
24	(Italy) Luca Drudi	(Germany) Seikel Motorsport							7	5	Ret					7
24	(Italy) Luca Drudi	(Italy) GPC Giesse Squadra Corse												5		7
25	(Italy) Mauro Casadei	(Czech Republic) Vonka Racing			5	Ret							7			6
25	(Germany) Oliver Mathai	(Germany) JP Racing			Ret			7				5				6
26	(United Kingdom) Warren Hughes	(United Kingdom) GruppeM Europe							3	4	Ret					5.5
27	(United Kingdom) Andrew Kirkaldy	(United Kingdom) Scuderia Ecosse						4								5
27	(United Kingdom) Nathan Kinch	(United Kingdom) Scuderia Ecosse						4								5
27	(Italy) Alessandro Piccolo	(Italy) MIK Corse										4				5
27	(Italy) Giovanni Berton	(Italy) MIK Corse										4				5
27	(Hong Kong) Matthew Marsh	(Italy) GPC Giesse Squadra Corse													4	5
27	(Hong Kong) Charles Kwan	(Italy) GPC Giesse Squadra Corse													4	5
28	(United States) Liz Halliday	(Italy) Autorlando Sport							6	8	6					5
28	(Italy) Luigi Moccia	(Italy) Autorlando Sport							6	8	6					5
28	(Italy) Morendo Soli	(Italy) Autorlando Sport							6	8	6					5
28	(Italy) Franco Groppi	(Italy) Autorlando Sport							6	8	6					5
29	(Italy) Marco Lambertini	(Italy) GPC Giesse Squadra Corse												5		4
30	(United Kingdom) David Warnock	(United Kingdom) JWR						6								3
30	(Germany) Kersten Jodexnis	(Germany) JP Racing				DNS							6			3
31	(Italy) Alex Caffi	(Germany) Seikel Motorsport							7	5	Ret					3
31	(Italy) Gabrio Rosa	(Germany) Seikel Motorsport							7	5	Ret					3
31	(United Kingdom) Robin Liddell	(Germany) Seikel Motorsport							7	5	Ret					3
32	(United Kingdom) Adam Jones	(United Kingdom) Cirtek Motorsport							10	10	7	9				2
33	(United States) Vic Rice	(United Kingdom) Cirtek Motorsport							10	10	7					2
33	(United Kingdom) John Grant	(United Kingdom) Cirtek Motorsport							10	10	7					2
34	(Slovakia) Rudolf Machánek	(Slovakia) Machánek Racing					8									1
34	(Czech Republic) Jaroslav Honzík	(Slovakia) Machánek Racing					8									1
34	(Italy) Marco Panzavuota	(Czech Republic) Vonka Racing										8				1
34	(Italy) Massimiliano Degiovanni	(Czech Republic) Vonka Racing										8				1
Pos.	Driver	Team	MON (Italy)	VAL (Spain)	MAG (France)	HOC (Germany)	BRN (Czech Republic)	DON (United Kingdom)	6H	12H	24H	IMO (Italy)	OSC (Germany)	DUB (United Arab Emirates)	ZHU (China)	Total points
Pos.	Driver	Team	MON (Italy)	VAL (Spain)	MAG (France)	HOC (Germany)	BRN (Czech Republic)	DON (United Kingdom)	SPA (Belgium)			IMO (Italy)	OSC (Germany)	DUB (United Arab Emirates)	ZHU (China)	Total points

== Teams Championship ==
Points were awarded separately in both GT and N-GT to the top 8 class finishers in the order of 10–8–6–5–4–3–2–1. At the Spa 24 Hours only, half points were also granted to the leading eight cars at the 12-hour mark. Both cars scored points towards the championship.

=== GT Standings ===
Due to the Maserati MC12 not being homologated, AF Corse was not eligible to score points from Round 8 through Round 10. Championship points were redistributed to other GT competitors, ignoring the placing of the AF Corse cars. At Round 11 the homologation was approved and AF Corse was then allowed to score points.

Pos.	Team	MON (Italy)	VAL (Spain)	MAG (France)	HOC (Germany)	BRN (Czech Republic)	DON (United Kingdom)	SPA (Belgium)			IMO (Italy)	OSC (Germany)	DUB (United Arab Emirates)	ZHU (China)	Total points
Pos.	Team	MON (Italy)	VAL (Spain)	MAG (France)	HOC (Germany)	BRN (Czech Republic)	DON (United Kingdom)	6H	12H	24H	IMO (Italy)	OSC (Germany)	DUB (United Arab Emirates)	ZHU (China)	Total points
1	(Italy) BMS Scuderia Italia	1	1	3	1	3	4	3	1	1	2	1	1	3	159.5
1	(Italy) BMS Scuderia Italia	2	2	4	2	11	5	2	4	3	4	4	4	10	159.5
2	(Italy) GPC Giesse Squadra Corse	3	Ret	6	5	4	3	1	2	2	5	7	5	6	72
2	(Italy) GPC Giesse Squadra Corse	4	Ret	13	6	Ret	6	10	9	6	6	Ret	9	8	72
3	(Monaco) JMB Racing	7	4	2	9	2	1	8	5	4	7	3	13	5	60
3	(Monaco) JMB Racing	Ret	7	Ret	11	8	10	6	10	NC	11	8	Ret	9	60
4	(Germany) Vitaphone Racing Team	Ret	Ret	1	13	1	2	Ret	Ret	Ret	1	14	3	Ret	44
5	(United Kingdom) Care Racing	5	Ret	Ret	3	7	7				3	5	2	4	37
6	(United Kingdom) RML	8	6	10	8	12	8	4	8	Ret	8	2	6	7	26
6	(United Kingdom) RML	9	10	Ret	Ret	13	9	Ret	Ret	Ret	Ret	6	Ret	12	26
7	(Italy) AF Corse										NC	NC	NC	1	18
7	(Italy) AF Corse										NC	NC	Ret	2	18
8	(United Kingdom) Creation Autosportif	Ret	5	7	4	5	15	9	7	Ret	Ret				16
9	(Netherlands) Zwaans GTR Racing Team	6	9	8	7	9	11	5	3	Ret	13	10	11	13	11
9	(Netherlands) Zwaans GTR Racing Team	Ret	13	9	Ret	Ret	Ret	Ret	Ret	Ret					11
10	(Germany) Konrad Motorsport	Ret	11	5	Ret	6	14	Ret	Ret	Ret	Ret	13	12	Ret	7
11	(Germany) Reiter Engineering		3												6
12	(France) Force One Racing Festina							12	6	5					5.5
13	(United Kingdom) Graham Nash Motorsport	10	12	NC	Ret	10	13	11	Ret	Ret	10	9	7	Ret	2
14	(Monaco) JMB	Ret	8	11	10	14	12				9	11	8	11	2
15	(United Kingdom) Lister Racing	Ret	Ret		12			7	Ret	Ret					1
-	(Italy) Scuderia Veregra										Ret		10	Ret	0
-	(France) DAMS										12	12	Ret	14	0
-	(France) DAMS										Ret	Ret	Ret	Ret	0
-	(Germany) Wieth Racing	DNS	Ret	12			Ret								0

Colour	Result
Gold	Winner
Silver	Second place
Bronze	Third place
Green	Points classification
Blue	Non-points classification
Blue	Non-classified finish (NC)
Purple	Retired, not classified (Ret)
Red	Did not qualify (DNQ)
Red	Did not pre-qualify (DNPQ)
Black	Disqualified (DSQ)
White	Did not start (DNS)
White	Withdrew (WD)
White	Race cancelled (C)
Blank	Did not practice (DNP)
Blank	Did not arrive (DNA)
Blank	Excluded (EX)

=== N-GT Standings ===
Pos.	Team	MON (Italy)	VAL (Spain)	MAG (France)	HOC (Germany)	BRN (Czech Republic)	DON (United Kingdom)	SPA (Belgium)			IMO (Italy)	OSC (Germany)	DUB (United Arab Emirates)	ZHU (China)	Total points
Pos.	Team	MON (Italy)	VAL (Spain)	MAG (France)	HOC (Germany)	BRN (Czech Republic)	DON (United Kingdom)	6H	12H	24H	IMO (Italy)	OSC (Germany)	DUB (United Arab Emirates)	ZHU (China)	Total points
1	(Germany) Yukos Freisinger Motorsport	1	3	2	2	3	1	2	2	1	2	2	2	Ret	138
1	(Germany) Yukos Freisinger Motorsport	Ret	4	3	Ret	4	Ret	1	1	2	3	4	6	Ret	138
2	(Germany) Freisinger Motorsport	NC	1	1	1	2	2	8	3	3	1	1	1	2	93.5
3	(Italy) GPC Giesse Squadra Corse	2	2	Ret	3	1	5	Ret	Ret	Ret	DSQ	3	3	1	67
3	(Italy) GPC Giesse Squadra Corse												5	4	67
4	(Germany) Proton Competition	3	5	4	4	5	8	5	7	5	7	5	7	5	45
4	(Germany) Proton Competition												8	Ret	45
5	(United Kingdom) GruppeM Europe						3	3	4	Ret			4	6	19.5
6	(Czech Republic) Vonka Racing		6	5	Ret	6					8	7	9	3	19
7	(Italy) AB Motorsport	4		NC	5						6				12
8	(United Kingdom) JWR						6	4	6	4					12
9	(Germany) JP Racing			Ret	DNS		7				5	6			9
10	(United Kingdom) Scuderia Ecosse						4								5
10	(Italy) MIK Corse										4				5
11	(Italy) Autorlando Sport							6	8	6					5
12	(Germany) Seikel Motorsport							7	5	Ret					3
13	(United Kingdom) Cirtek Motorsport							10	10	7	9				2
13	(United Kingdom) Cirtek Motorsport							DNS	DNS	DNS					2
14	(Germany) JVG Racing					7									2
15	(Slovakia) Machánek Racing					8									1
15	(Slovakia) Machánek Racing					Ret									1
-	(United Kingdom) Graham Nash Motorsport							9	9	Ret			10	DNS	0
-	(Spain) Darro Motor Racing		Ret												0
-	(United Kingdom) RJN Motorsport							Ret	Ret	Ret				Ret	0
-	(Italy) Scuderia Veregra										DNS				0

== Bibliography ==
- Asselberghs, Denis; Richardson, Frederic (2004). 2004 FIA GT Championship Annual. Brussels: Apach Media. ISBN 978-2930354286.
