= 2004 FIA GT Monza 500km =

Layout of the Autodromo Nazionale Monza

The 2004 FIA GT Monza 500 km was the first round the 2004 FIA GT Championship season. It took place at the Autodromo Nazionale Monza, Italy, on March 28, 2004.

== Official results ==
Class winners in bold. Cars failing to complete 70% of winner's distance marked as Not Classified (NC).

Pos	Class	No	Team	Drivers	Chassis	Tyre	Laps
Pos	Class	No	Team	Drivers	Engine	Tyre	Laps
1	**GT**	**2**	**(Italy) BMS Scuderia Italia**	**(Italy) Fabrizio Gollin (Italy) Luca Cappellari**	**Ferrari 550-GTS Maranello**	MI	**87**
1	**GT**	**2**	**(Italy) BMS Scuderia Italia**	**(Italy) Fabrizio Gollin (Italy) Luca Cappellari**	**Ferrari 5.9L V12**	MI	**87**
2	GT	1	(Italy) BMS Scuderia Italia	(Italy) Matteo Bobbi (Switzerland) Gabriele Gardel	Ferrari 550-GTS Maranello	MI	87
2	GT	1	(Italy) BMS Scuderia Italia	(Italy) Matteo Bobbi (Switzerland) Gabriele Gardel	Ferrari 5.9L V12	MI	87
3	GT	11	(Italy) G.P.C. Giesse Squadra Corse	(Austria) Philipp Peter (Italy) Fabio Babini	Ferrari 575-GTC Maranello	P	87
3	GT	11	(Italy) G.P.C. Giesse Squadra Corse	(Austria) Philipp Peter (Italy) Fabio Babini	Ferrari 6.0L V12	P	87
4	GT	13	(Italy) G.P.C. Giesse Squadra Corse	(Italy) Emanuele Naspetti (Netherlands) Mike Hezemans	Ferrari 575-GTC Maranello	P	86
4	GT	13	(Italy) G.P.C. Giesse Squadra Corse	(Italy) Emanuele Naspetti (Netherlands) Mike Hezemans	Ferrari 6.0L V12	P	86
5	GT	3	(United Kingdom) Care Racing Developments (Italy) BMS Scuderia Italia	(Italy) Stefano Livio (Switzerland) Enzo Calderari (Switzerland) Lilian Bryner	Ferrari 550-GTS Maranello	MI	85
5	GT	3	(United Kingdom) Care Racing Developments (Italy) BMS Scuderia Italia	(Italy) Stefano Livio (Switzerland) Enzo Calderari (Switzerland) Lilian Bryner	Ferrari 5.9L V12	MI	85
6	GT	10	(Netherlands) Zwaans GTR Racing Team	(France) Christophe Bouchut (Belgium) Marc Goossens (Netherlands) Arjan van der Zwaan	Chrysler Viper GTS-R	D	84
6	GT	10	(Netherlands) Zwaans GTR Racing Team	(France) Christophe Bouchut (Belgium) Marc Goossens (Netherlands) Arjan van der Zwaan	Chrysler 8.0L V10	D	84
7	**N-GT**	**50**	**(Germany) Yukos Freisinger Motorsport**	**(France) Emmanuel Collard (Monaco) Stéphane Ortelli**	**Porsche 911 GT3-RSR**	MI	**84**
7	**N-GT**	**50**	**(Germany) Yukos Freisinger Motorsport**	**(France) Emmanuel Collard (Monaco) Stéphane Ortelli**	**Porsche 3.6L Flat-6**	MI	**84**
8	N-GT	62	(Italy) G.P.C. Giesse Squadra Corse	(Italy) Fabrizio de Simone (Italy) Christian Pescatori	Ferrari 360 Modena GTC	P	84
8	N-GT	62	(Italy) G.P.C. Giesse Squadra Corse	(Italy) Fabrizio de Simone (Italy) Christian Pescatori	Ferrari 3.6L V8	P	84
9	GT	18	(Monaco) JMB Racing	(United Kingdom) Ian Khan (Belgium) Bert Longin (France) Christophe Pillon	Ferrari 575-GTC Maranello	MI	83
9	GT	18	(Monaco) JMB Racing	(United Kingdom) Ian Khan (Belgium) Bert Longin (France) Christophe Pillon	Ferrari 6.0L V12	MI	83
10	GT	8	(United Kingdom) Ray Mallock Ltd.	(United Kingdom) Chris Goodwin (Portugal) Miguel Ramos	Saleen S7-R	D	81
10	GT	8	(United Kingdom) Ray Mallock Ltd.	(United Kingdom) Chris Goodwin (Portugal) Miguel Ramos	Ford 7.0L V8	D	81
11	N-GT	69	(Germany) Proton Competition	(Germany) Gerold Ried (Germany) Christian Ried (Poland) Maciej Marcinkiewicz	Porsche 911 GT3-RS	D	79
11	N-GT	69	(Germany) Proton Competition	(Germany) Gerold Ried (Germany) Christian Ried (Poland) Maciej Marcinkiewicz	Porsche 3.6L Flat-6	D	79
12	GT	7	(United Kingdom) Ray Mallock Ltd.	(United Kingdom) Mike Newton (Brazil) Thomas Erdos	Saleen S7-R	D	78
12	GT	7	(United Kingdom) Ray Mallock Ltd.	(United Kingdom) Mike Newton (Brazil) Thomas Erdos	Ford 7.0L V8	D	78
13	N-GT	56	(Italy) AB Motorsport	(Italy) Bruno Barbaro (Italy) Antonio De Castro (Italy) Renato Premoli	Porsche 911 GT3-RS	D	78
13	N-GT	56	(Italy) AB Motorsport	(Italy) Bruno Barbaro (Italy) Antonio De Castro (Italy) Renato Premoli	Porsche 3.6L Flat-6	D	78
14	GT	28	(United Kingdom) Graham Nash Motorsport	(Italy) Paolo Ruberti (Germany) Harold Becker (Spain) Jesús Diez de Villaroel	Saleen S7-R	D	60
14	GT	28	(United Kingdom) Graham Nash Motorsport	(Italy) Paolo Ruberti (Germany) Harold Becker (Spain) Jesús Diez de Villaroel	Ford 7.0L V8	D	60
15 NC	N-GT	99	(Germany) Freisinger Motorsport	(Germany) Sascha Maassen (Germany) Lucas Luhr	Porsche 911 GT3-RSR	MI	49
15 NC	N-GT	99	(Germany) Freisinger Motorsport	(Germany) Sascha Maassen (Germany) Lucas Luhr	Porsche 3.6L Flat-6	MI	49
16 DNF	GT	9	(Netherlands) Zwaans GTR Racing Team	(Germany) Klaus Abbelen (Sweden) Henrik Roos (Netherlands) Rob van der Zwaan	Chrysler Viper GTS-R	D	47
16 DNF	GT	9	(Netherlands) Zwaans GTR Racing Team	(Germany) Klaus Abbelen (Sweden) Henrik Roos (Netherlands) Rob van der Zwaan	Chrysler 8.0L V10	D	47
17 DNF	N-GT	77	(Germany) Yukos Freisinger Motorsport	(Russia) Nikolai Fomenko (Russia) Alexey Vasilyev	Porsche 911 GT3-RSR	MI	45
17 DNF	N-GT	77	(Germany) Yukos Freisinger Motorsport	(Russia) Nikolai Fomenko (Russia) Alexey Vasilyev	Porsche 3.6L Flat-6	MI	45
18 DNF	GT	27	(United Kingdom) Creation Autosportif	(United Kingdom) Jamie Campbell-Walter (United Kingdom) Jamie Derbyshire	Lister Storm	D	29
18 DNF	GT	27	(United Kingdom) Creation Autosportif	(United Kingdom) Jamie Campbell-Walter (United Kingdom) Jamie Derbyshire	Jaguar 7.0L V12	D	29
19 DNF	GT	19	(Monaco) JMB	(France) Stéphane Daoudi (France) Antoine Gosse (Netherlands) Peter Kutemann	Ferrari 575-GTC Maranello	MI	28
19 DNF	GT	19	(Monaco) JMB	(France) Stéphane Daoudi (France) Antoine Gosse (Netherlands) Peter Kutemann	Ferrari 6.0L V12	MI	28
20 DNF	GT	14	(United Kingdom) Lister Cars	(United Kingdom) Patrick Pearce (United Kingdom) Paul Knapfield (Netherlands) Tom Coronel	Lister Storm	D	19
20 DNF	GT	14	(United Kingdom) Lister Cars	(United Kingdom) Patrick Pearce (United Kingdom) Paul Knapfield (Netherlands) Tom Coronel	Jaguar 7.0L V12	D	19
21 DNF	GT	5	(Germany) Vitaphone Racing Team (Germany) Konrad Motorsport	(Germany) Michael Bartels (Germany) Uwe Alzen	Saleen S7-R	P	10
21 DNF	GT	5	(Germany) Vitaphone Racing Team (Germany) Konrad Motorsport	(Germany) Michael Bartels (Germany) Uwe Alzen	Ford 7.0L V8	P	10
22 DNF	GT	17	(Monaco) JMB Racing	(Austria) Karl Wendlinger (Austria) Toto Wolff (Austria) Robert Lechner	Ferrari 575-GTC Maranello	MI	2
22 DNF	GT	17	(Monaco) JMB Racing	(Austria) Karl Wendlinger (Austria) Toto Wolff (Austria) Robert Lechner	Ferrari 6.0L V12	MI	2
23 DNF	GT	4	(Germany) Konrad Motorsport	(Austria) Franz Konrad (Austria) Walter Lechner, Jr. (Switzerland) Toni Seiler	Saleen S7-R	P	1
23 DNF	GT	4	(Germany) Konrad Motorsport	(Austria) Franz Konrad (Austria) Walter Lechner, Jr. (Switzerland) Toni Seiler	Ford 7.0L V8	P	1
DNS	GT	22	(Germany) Wieth Racing	(Germany) Wolfgang Kaufmann (Italy) Paolo Biglieri (Italy) Vittorio Zoboli	Ferrari 550 Maranello	D	–
DNS	GT	22	(Germany) Wieth Racing	(Germany) Wolfgang Kaufmann (Italy) Paolo Biglieri (Italy) Vittorio Zoboli	Ferrari 6.0L V12	D	–

== Statistics ==
- Pole position – #2 BMS Scuderia Italia – 1:43.509
- Fastest lap – #5 Vitaphone Racing Team – 1:44.708
- Race winner average speed – 189.060 km/h

FIA GT Championship
Previous race: None	2004 season	Next race: 2004 FIA GT Valencia 500km
