= 2004 FIA GT Donington 500km =

Layout of the Donington Park

The 2004 FIA GT Donington 500 km was the sixth round of the 2004 FIA GT Championship season. It took place at the Donington Park, United Kingdom, on 27 June 2004.

Several competitors from the British GT Championship participated in this event, although the TVR Tuscans were required to run in a separate special class due to the cars not meeting N-GT homologation requirements. The #5 Vitaphone Saleen overtook the #17 JMB Ferrari for the lead, then quickly built up a gap of 8 seconds. In the last lap at the chicane, the #5 had come together with the #99 Porsche and the former suffered a puncture. The damage to the Saleen was enough to lose the win as Jaime Melo retook the lead in the final corner. Matteo Bobbi was able to unlap the #17 Ferrari on the final corner as well and gained a lap advantage.

== Official results ==
Class winners in bold. Cars failing to complete 70% of winner's distance marked as Not Classified (NC).

Pos	Class	No	Team	Drivers	Chassis	Tyre	Laps
Pos	Class	No	Team	Drivers	Engine	Tyre	Laps
1	**GT**	**17**	**(Monaco) JMB Racing**	**(Austria) Karl Wendlinger (Brazil) Jaime Melo**	**Ferrari 575-GTC Maranello**	MI	**117**
1	**GT**	**17**	**(Monaco) JMB Racing**	**(Austria) Karl Wendlinger (Brazil) Jaime Melo**	**Ferrari 6.0L V12**	MI	**117**
2	GT	5	(Germany) Vitaphone Racing Team (Germany) Konrad Motorsport	(Germany) Michael Bartels (Germany) Uwe Alzen	Saleen S7-R	P	117
2	GT	5	(Germany) Vitaphone Racing Team (Germany) Konrad Motorsport	(Germany) Michael Bartels (Germany) Uwe Alzen	Ford 7.0L V8	P	117
3	GT	11	(Italy) G.P.C. Giesse Squadra Corse	(Austria) Philipp Peter (Italy) Fabio Babini	Ferrari 575-GTC Maranello	P	117
3	GT	11	(Italy) G.P.C. Giesse Squadra Corse	(Austria) Philipp Peter (Italy) Fabio Babini	Ferrari 6.0L V12	P	117
4	GT	1	(Italy) BMS Scuderia Italia	(Italy) Matteo Bobbi (Switzerland) Gabriele Gardel	Ferrari 550-GTS Maranello	MI	117
4	GT	1	(Italy) BMS Scuderia Italia	(Italy) Matteo Bobbi (Switzerland) Gabriele Gardel	Ferrari 5.9L V12	MI	117
5	GT	2	(Italy) BMS Scuderia Italia	(Italy) Fabrizio Gollin (Italy) Luca Cappellari	Ferrari 550-GTS Maranello	MI	117
5	GT	2	(Italy) BMS Scuderia Italia	(Italy) Fabrizio Gollin (Italy) Luca Cappellari	Ferrari 5.9L V12	MI	117
6	GT	13	(Italy) G.P.C. Giesse Squadra Corse	(Italy) Emanuele Naspetti (Italy) Gianni Morbidelli	Ferrari 575-GTC Maranello	P	116
6	GT	13	(Italy) G.P.C. Giesse Squadra Corse	(Italy) Emanuele Naspetti (Italy) Gianni Morbidelli	Ferrari 6.0L V12	P	116
7	GT	3	(United Kingdom) Care Racing Developments (Italy) BMS Scuderia Italia	(Italy) Stefano Livio (Switzerland) Enzo Calderari (Switzerland) Lilian Bryner	Ferrari 550-GTS Maranello	MI	116
7	GT	3	(United Kingdom) Care Racing Developments (Italy) BMS Scuderia Italia	(Italy) Stefano Livio (Switzerland) Enzo Calderari (Switzerland) Lilian Bryner	Ferrari 5.9L V12	MI	116
8	GT	7	(United Kingdom) Ray Mallock Ltd.	(United Kingdom) Mike Newton (Brazil) Thomas Erdos	Saleen S7-R	D	116
8	GT	7	(United Kingdom) Ray Mallock Ltd.	(United Kingdom) Mike Newton (Brazil) Thomas Erdos	Ford 7.0L V8	D	116
9	GT	8	(United Kingdom) Ray Mallock Ltd.	(United Kingdom) Chris Goodwin (Portugal) Miguel Ramos	Saleen S7-R	D	115
9	GT	8	(United Kingdom) Ray Mallock Ltd.	(United Kingdom) Chris Goodwin (Portugal) Miguel Ramos	Ford 7.0L V8	D	115
10	**N-GT**	**50**	**(Germany) Yukos Freisinger Motorsport**	**(France) Emmanuel Collard (Monaco) Stéphane Ortelli**	**Porsche 911 GT3-RSR**	MI	**114**
10	**N-GT**	**50**	**(Germany) Yukos Freisinger Motorsport**	**(France) Emmanuel Collard (Monaco) Stéphane Ortelli**	**Porsche 3.6L Flat-6**	MI	**114**
11	N-GT	99	(Germany) Freisinger Motorsport	(Germany) Sascha Maassen (Germany) Lucas Luhr	Porsche 911 GT3-RSR	MI	114
11	N-GT	99	(Germany) Freisinger Motorsport	(Germany) Sascha Maassen (Germany) Lucas Luhr	Porsche 3.6L Flat-6	MI	114
12	GT	18	(Monaco) JMB Racing	(Belgium) Bert Longin (Italy) Lorenzo Casè (Italy) Matteo Malucelli	Ferrari 575-GTC Maranello	MI	113
12	GT	18	(Monaco) JMB Racing	(Belgium) Bert Longin (Italy) Lorenzo Casè (Italy) Matteo Malucelli	Ferrari 6.0L V12	MI	113
13	GT	10	(Netherlands) Zwaans GTR Racing Team	(Belgium) Stéphane Lemeret (Sweden) Henrik Roos (Netherlands) Arjan van der Zwaan	Chrysler Viper GTS-R	D	113
13	GT	10	(Netherlands) Zwaans GTR Racing Team	(Belgium) Stéphane Lemeret (Sweden) Henrik Roos (Netherlands) Arjan van der Zwaan	Chrysler 8.0L V10	D	113
14	N-GT	88	(United Kingdom) GruppeM	(United Kingdom) Tim Mullen (United Kingdom) Jonathan Cocker	Porsche 911 GT3-RSR	D	112
14	N-GT	88	(United Kingdom) GruppeM	(United Kingdom) Tim Mullen (United Kingdom) Jonathan Cocker	Porsche 3.6L Flat-6	D	112
15	N-GT	65	(United Kingdom) Scuderia Ecosse	(United Kingdom) Andrew Kirkaldy (United Kingdom) Nathan Kinch	Ferrari 360 Modena GTC	P	111
15	N-GT	65	(United Kingdom) Scuderia Ecosse	(United Kingdom) Andrew Kirkaldy (United Kingdom) Nathan Kinch	Ferrari 3.6L V8	P	111
16	GT	19	(Monaco) JMB	(Italy) Mauro Casadei (Italy) Andrea Garbagnati (France) Antoine Gosse	Ferrari 575-GTC Maranello	MI	111
16	GT	19	(Monaco) JMB	(Italy) Mauro Casadei (Italy) Andrea Garbagnati (France) Antoine Gosse	Ferrari 6.0L V12	MI	111
17	N-GT	62	(Italy) G.P.C. Giesse Squadra Corse	(Italy) Fabrizio de Simone (Italy) Christian Pescatori	Ferrari 360 Modena GTC	P	110
17	N-GT	62	(Italy) G.P.C. Giesse Squadra Corse	(Italy) Fabrizio de Simone (Italy) Christian Pescatori	Ferrari 3.6L V8	P	110
18	**SP2**	**153**	**(United Kingdom) RSR**	**(United Kingdom) Lawrence Tomlinson (United Kingdom) Nigel Greensall**	**TVR Tuscan T400R**	D	**110**
18	**SP2**	**153**	**(United Kingdom) RSR**	**(United Kingdom) Lawrence Tomlinson (United Kingdom) Nigel Greensall**	**TVR Speed Six 4.0L I6**	D	**110**
19	N-GT	71	(United Kingdom) JWR	(United Kingdom) Mike Jordan (United Kingdom) David Warnock	Porsche 911 GT3-RS	D	109
19	N-GT	71	(United Kingdom) JWR	(United Kingdom) Mike Jordan (United Kingdom) David Warnock	Porsche 3.6L Flat-6	D	109
20	N-GT	59	(Germany) Jens Petersen Racing	(Germany) Jens Petersen (Germany) Oliver Mathai (Germany) Jan-Dirk Lueders	Porsche 911 GT3-RS	MI	106
20	N-GT	59	(Germany) Jens Petersen Racing	(Germany) Jens Petersen (Germany) Oliver Mathai (Germany) Jan-Dirk Lueders	Porsche 3.6L Flat-6	MI	106
21	GT	28	(United Kingdom) Graham Nash Motorsport	(Italy) Paolo Ruberti (United Kingdom) Paul Whight (United Kingdom) David Leslie	Saleen S7-R	D	106
21	GT	28	(United Kingdom) Graham Nash Motorsport	(Italy) Paolo Ruberti (United Kingdom) Paul Whight (United Kingdom) David Leslie	Ford 7.0L V8	D	106
22	GT	4	(Germany) Konrad Motorsport	(United Kingdom) Paul Knapfield (Germany) Harald Becker (Switzerland) Toni Seiler	Saleen S7-R	P	104
22	GT	4	(Germany) Konrad Motorsport	(United Kingdom) Paul Knapfield (Germany) Harald Becker (Switzerland) Toni Seiler	Ford 7.0L V8	P	104
23	N-GT	69	(Germany) Proton Competition	(Germany) Gerold Ried (Germany) Christian Ried	Porsche 911 GT3-RS	D	80
23	N-GT	69	(Germany) Proton Competition	(Germany) Gerold Ried (Germany) Christian Ried	Porsche 3.6L Flat-6	D	80
24	GT	27	(United Kingdom) Creation Autosportif	(United Kingdom) Jamie Campbell-Walter (United Kingdom) Jamie Derbyshire (United Kingdom) Bobby Verdon-Roe	Lister Storm	D	83
24	GT	27	(United Kingdom) Creation Autosportif	(United Kingdom) Jamie Campbell-Walter (United Kingdom) Jamie Derbyshire (United Kingdom) Bobby Verdon-Roe	Jaguar 7.0L V12	D	83
25 DNF	N-GT	77	(Germany) Yukos Freisinger Motorsport	(Russia) Nikolai Fomenko (Russia) Alexey Vasilyev	Porsche 911 GT3-RSR	MI	83
25 DNF	N-GT	77	(Germany) Yukos Freisinger Motorsport	(Russia) Nikolai Fomenko (Russia) Alexey Vasilyev	Porsche 3.6L Flat-6	MI	83
26 DNF	GT	9	(Netherlands) Zwaans GTR Racing Team	(Belgium) Val Hillebrand (Netherlands) Rob van der Zwaan	Chrysler Viper GTS-R	D	56
26 DNF	GT	9	(Netherlands) Zwaans GTR Racing Team	(Belgium) Val Hillebrand (Netherlands) Rob van der Zwaan	Chrysler 8.0L V10	D	56
27 DNF	SP2	154	(United Kingdom) Synergy Motorsport	(United Kingdom) Bob Berridge (United Kingdom) Lee Caroline (United Kingdom) Christopher Stockton	TVR Tuscan T400R	D	51
27 DNF	SP2	154	(United Kingdom) Synergy Motorsport	(United Kingdom) Bob Berridge (United Kingdom) Lee Caroline (United Kingdom) Christopher Stockton	TVR Speed Six 4.0L I6	D	51
28 DNF	GT	22	(Germany) Wieth Racing	(Germany) Wolfgang Kaufmann (United Kingdom) Mark Mayall (United Kingdom) Rob Croydon	Ferrari 550 Maranello	D	36
28 DNF	GT	22	(Germany) Wieth Racing	(Germany) Wolfgang Kaufmann (United Kingdom) Mark Mayall (United Kingdom) Rob Croydon	Ferrari 6.0L V12	D	36

== Statistics ==
- Pole position – #4 Konrad Motorsport – 1:40.747
- Fastest lap – #5 Vitaphone Racing Team – 1:28.906
- Average speed – 156.670 km/h

FIA GT Championship
Previous race: 2004 FIA GT Brno 500km	2004 season	Next race: 2004 Spa 24 Hours
