= 2004 FIA GT Magny-Cours 500km =

Layout of the Circuit de Nevers Magny-Cours

The 2004 FIA GT Magny-Cours 500 km was the third round the 2004 FIA GT Championship season. It took place at the Circuit de Nevers Magny-Cours, France, on 2 May 2004.

== Official results ==
Class winners in bold. Cars failing to complete 70% of winner's distance marked as Not Classified (NC).

Pos	Class	No	Team	Drivers	Chassis	Tyre	Laps
Pos	Class	No	Team	Drivers	Engine	Tyre	Laps
1	**GT**	**5**	**(Germany) Vitaphone Racing Team (Germany) Konrad Motorsport**	**(Germany) Michael Bartels (Germany) Uwe Alzen**	**Saleen S7-R**	P	**105**
1	**GT**	**5**	**(Germany) Vitaphone Racing Team (Germany) Konrad Motorsport**	**(Germany) Michael Bartels (Germany) Uwe Alzen**	**Ford 7.0L V8**	P	**105**
2	GT	17	(Monaco) JMB Racing	(Austria) Karl Wendlinger (Austria) Toto Wolff (Austria) Robert Lechner	Ferrari 575-GTC Maranello	MI	105
2	GT	17	(Monaco) JMB Racing	(Austria) Karl Wendlinger (Austria) Toto Wolff (Austria) Robert Lechner	Ferrari 6.0L V12	MI	105
3	GT	2	(Italy) BMS Scuderia Italia	(Italy) Fabrizio Gollin (Italy) Luca Cappellari	Ferrari 550-GTS Maranello	MI	105
3	GT	2	(Italy) BMS Scuderia Italia	(Italy) Fabrizio Gollin (Italy) Luca Cappellari	Ferrari 5.9L V12	MI	105
4	GT	1	(Italy) BMS Scuderia Italia	(Italy) Matteo Bobbi (Switzerland) Gabriele Gardel	Ferrari 550-GTS Maranello	MI	105
4	GT	1	(Italy) BMS Scuderia Italia	(Italy) Matteo Bobbi (Switzerland) Gabriele Gardel	Ferrari 5.9L V12	MI	105
5	GT	4	(Germany) Konrad Motorsport	(Austria) Franz Konrad (Austria) Walter Lechner Jr. (Switzerland) Toni Seiler	Saleen S7-R	P	105
5	GT	4	(Germany) Konrad Motorsport	(Austria) Franz Konrad (Austria) Walter Lechner Jr. (Switzerland) Toni Seiler	Ford 7.0L V8	P	105
6	GT	11	(Italy) G.P.C. Giesse Squadra Corse	(Austria) Philipp Peter (Italy) Fabio Babini	Ferrari 575-GTC Maranello	P	104
6	GT	11	(Italy) G.P.C. Giesse Squadra Corse	(Austria) Philipp Peter (Italy) Fabio Babini	Ferrari 6.0L V12	P	104
7	GT	27	(United Kingdom) Creation Autosportif	(United Kingdom) Jamie Campbell-Walter (United Kingdom) Jamie Derbyshire	Lister Storm	D	103
7	GT	27	(United Kingdom) Creation Autosportif	(United Kingdom) Jamie Campbell-Walter (United Kingdom) Jamie Derbyshire	Jaguar 7.0L V12	D	103
8	**N-GT**	**99**	**(Germany) Freisinger Motorsport**	**(Germany) Sascha Maassen (Germany) Lucas Luhr**	**Porsche 911 GT3-RSR**	MI	**103**
8	**N-GT**	**99**	**(Germany) Freisinger Motorsport**	**(Germany) Sascha Maassen (Germany) Lucas Luhr**	**Porsche 3.6L Flat-6**	MI	**103**
9	N-GT	50	(Germany) Yukos Freisinger Motorsport	(France) Emmanuel Collard (Monaco) Stéphane Ortelli	Porsche 911 GT3-RSR	MI	102
9	N-GT	50	(Germany) Yukos Freisinger Motorsport	(France) Emmanuel Collard (Monaco) Stéphane Ortelli	Porsche 3.6L Flat-6	MI	102
10	GT	10	(Netherlands) Zwaans GTR Racing Team	(France) Christophe Bouchut (Sweden) Henrik Roos (Netherlands) Arjan van der Zwaan	Chrysler Viper GTS-R	D	101
10	GT	10	(Netherlands) Zwaans GTR Racing Team	(France) Christophe Bouchut (Sweden) Henrik Roos (Netherlands) Arjan van der Zwaan	Chrysler 8.0L V10	D	101
11	GT	9	(Netherlands) Zwaans GTR Racing Team	(Germany) Klaus Abbelen (Netherlands) Rob van der Zwaan	Chrysler Viper GTS-R	D	101
11	GT	9	(Netherlands) Zwaans GTR Racing Team	(Germany) Klaus Abbelen (Netherlands) Rob van der Zwaan	Chrysler 8.0L V10	D	101
12	GT	8	(United Kingdom) Ray Mallock Ltd.	(United Kingdom) Chris Goodwin (Portugal) Miguel Ramos	Saleen S7-R	D	101
12	GT	8	(United Kingdom) Ray Mallock Ltd.	(United Kingdom) Chris Goodwin (Portugal) Miguel Ramos	Ford 7.0L V8	D	101
13	GT	19	(Monaco) JMB	(France) Stéphane Daoudi (France) Antoine Gosse (Netherlands) Peter Kutemann	Ferrari 575-GTC Maranello	MI	100
13	GT	19	(Monaco) JMB	(France) Stéphane Daoudi (France) Antoine Gosse (Netherlands) Peter Kutemann	Ferrari 6.0L V12	MI	100
14	N-GT	77	(Germany) Yukos Freisinger Motorsport	(Russia) Nikolai Fomenko (Russia) Alexey Vasilyev	Porsche 911 GT3-RSR	MI	98
14	N-GT	77	(Germany) Yukos Freisinger Motorsport	(Russia) Nikolai Fomenko (Russia) Alexey Vasilyev	Porsche 3.6L Flat-6	MI	98
15	GT	22	(Germany) Wieth Racing	(Germany) Wolfgang Kaufmann (Italy) Vittorio Zoboli	Ferrari 550 Maranello	D	96
15	GT	22	(Germany) Wieth Racing	(Germany) Wolfgang Kaufmann (Italy) Vittorio Zoboli	Ferrari 6.0L V12	D	96
16	N-GT	69	(Germany) Proton Competition	(Germany) Gerold Ried (Germany) Christian Ried	Porsche 911 GT3-RS	D	96
16	N-GT	69	(Germany) Proton Competition	(Germany) Gerold Ried (Germany) Christian Ried	Porsche 3.6L Flat-6	D	96
17	GT	13	(Italy) G.P.C. Giesse Squadra Corse	(Italy) Emanuele Naspetti (Netherlands) Mike Hezemans	Ferrari 575-GTC Maranello	P	91
17	GT	13	(Italy) G.P.C. Giesse Squadra Corse	(Italy) Emanuele Naspetti (Netherlands) Mike Hezemans	Ferrari 6.0L V12	P	91
18	N-GT	57	(Czech Republic) Vonka Racing	(Czech Republic) Jan Vonka (Italy) Mauro Casadei	Porsche 911 GT3-R	P	84
18	N-GT	57	(Czech Republic) Vonka Racing	(Czech Republic) Jan Vonka (Italy) Mauro Casadei	Porsche 3.6L Flat-6	P	84
19 NC	GT	28	(United Kingdom) Graham Nash Motorsport	(Italy) Paolo Ruberti (Italy) Luca Pirri-Ardizzone (Spain) Jesús Diez de Villaroel	Saleen S7-R	D	56
19 NC	GT	28	(United Kingdom) Graham Nash Motorsport	(Italy) Paolo Ruberti (Italy) Luca Pirri-Ardizzone (Spain) Jesús Diez de Villaroel	Ford 7.0L V8	D	56
20 NC	N-GT	56	(Italy) AB Motorsport	(Italy) Bruno Barbaro (Italy) Antonio De Castro (Italy) Renato Premoli	Porsche 911 GT3-RS	D	28
20 NC	N-GT	56	(Italy) AB Motorsport	(Italy) Bruno Barbaro (Italy) Antonio De Castro (Italy) Renato Premoli	Porsche 3.6L Flat-6	D	28
21 DNF	N-GT	59	(Germany) Jens Petersen Racing	(Germany) Jens Petersen (Germany) Oliver Mathai (Germany) Jan-Dirk Lueders	Porsche 911 GT3-RS	D	70
21 DNF	N-GT	59	(Germany) Jens Petersen Racing	(Germany) Jens Petersen (Germany) Oliver Mathai (Germany) Jan-Dirk Lueders	Porsche 3.6L Flat-6	D	70
22 DNF	GT	18	(Monaco) JMB Racing	(United Kingdom) Ian Khan (Belgium) Bert Longin (Austria) Thomas Bleiner	Ferrari 575-GTC Maranello	MI	69
22 DNF	GT	18	(Monaco) JMB Racing	(United Kingdom) Ian Khan (Belgium) Bert Longin (Austria) Thomas Bleiner	Ferrari 6.0L V12	MI	69
23 DNF	N-GT	62	(Italy) G.P.C. Giesse Squadra Corse	(Italy) Fabrizio de Simone (Italy) Christian Pescatori	Ferrari 360 Modena GTC	P	67
23 DNF	N-GT	62	(Italy) G.P.C. Giesse Squadra Corse	(Italy) Fabrizio de Simone (Italy) Christian Pescatori	Ferrari 3.6L V8	P	67
24 DNF	GT	3	(United Kingdom) Care Racing Developments (Italy) BMS Scuderia Italia	(Italy) Stefano Livio (Switzerland) Enzo Calderari (Switzerland) Lilian Bryner	Ferrari 550-GTS Maranello	MI	44
24 DNF	GT	3	(United Kingdom) Care Racing Developments (Italy) BMS Scuderia Italia	(Italy) Stefano Livio (Switzerland) Enzo Calderari (Switzerland) Lilian Bryner	Ferrari 5.9L V12	MI	44
25 DNF	GT	7	(United Kingdom) Ray Mallock Ltd.	(United Kingdom) Mike Newton (Brazil) Thomas Erdos	Saleen S7-R	D	1
25 DNF	GT	7	(United Kingdom) Ray Mallock Ltd.	(United Kingdom) Mike Newton (Brazil) Thomas Erdos	Ford 7.0L V8	D	1

== Statistics ==
- Pole position – #4 Konrad Motorsport – 1:36.174
- Fastest lap – #5 Vitaphone Racing Team – 1:39.093
- Race winner average speed – 154.130 km/h

FIA GT Championship
Previous race: 2004 FIA GT Valencia 500 km	2004 season	Next race: 2004 FIA GT Hockenheim 500 km
