= Thomas Bleiner =

Austrian racing driver

- Thomas at FIA GT Championship, Magny Cours 2004.
- Nationality: Austrian

Thomas Bleiner (born 30 December 1969) is an Austrian racing driver, inventor and businessman. He is the inventor of the laser anticrash system “All Weather Light”, a safety device for poor visibility conditions. In 2004, he was invited to the Global Road Safety, United Nations in New York, in order to promote safety in the automotive field. Lately, he is caring about renewable energy, especially about photovoltaic applications.

== Sports career ==
- 1992: German Formula 3 KMS TEAM
- 2000: Formula 3000 Italian Championship
- 2001: Porsche Pirelli Supercup KADACH TEAM
- 2001: Spider Renault
- 2002: Porsche Supercup KADACH TEAM and FIA GT
- 2003: Porsche Supercup DEWALT TEAM
- 2004: FIA GT with Ferrari 575 Maranello JMB TEAM

== Business career ==
- 1990: Commercial Director for Gamko BV
- 1992: “All Weather Light” laser Patent
- 1993-1996: Development of the laser Patent in USA
- 1997: Marine Engine Manager at Lamborghini Automobili SPA
- 2002: Founder of Astron Group Technologies SA
- 2004: Member of the Global Road Safety (UN)
- 2005: Joint Venture between Astron Group Technologie SA and FIAMM SPA
- 2006: Incorporation of Astron FIAMM Safety SPA
- 2007: CEO of Genius Sight LTD
- 2008: President of Bleiner AG
