= GTR – FIA GT Racing Game =

2005 video game

- European cover art
- Developer: Simbin Studios AB
- Publisher: 10tacle Publishing
- Designers: William Ian Bell; Stephen Viljoen
- Programmer: Andy Garton
- Artist: Eric Boosman
- Composer: Stephen Baysted
- Engine: ISImotor
- Platform: Microsoft Windows
- Release: EU: March 11, 2005; NA: May 3, 2005; AU: October 5, 2007
- Genre: Sim racing
- Modes: Single-player, multiplayer

GTR – FIA GT Racing Game is a sports car racing simulator developed by SimBin Studios AB (later Sector3 Studios and KW Studios) and published by 10tacle Publishing for the x86 PC in 2005. Simbin has also released an "add-on pack" called "Kings of Ovals" which contains a set of new oval-style tracks. The game uses the engine that was used for Sports Car GT (1999). A sequel, GTR 2 – FIA GT Racing Game, was released in 2006.

== Gameplay ==
The game features 10 real-life circuits and over 70 cars, including models from BMW, Ferrari and Porsche.

== Reception ==
GameSpot said: "Despite its blemishes, GTR is the breath of fresh air this genre so badly needed". They awarded the game a score of 8.8 (Great). IGN also praised the game and gave a score of 8.5 (Great).

GTR won PC Gamer US's "Best Racing Game 2005" award. The magazine's Andy Mahood wrote: "With its licensed field of exotic sports and GT machines, exquisitely rendered European circuits, and outstanding vehicle physics, GTR advanced the technology of racing simulations to hitherto unseen levels". It was also a runner-up for Computer Games Magazine's list of the top 10 computer games of 2005.
