= 2003 FIA GT Brno 500km =

Layout of the Brno Circuit

The 2003 FIA GT Brno 500 km was the fourth round the 2003 FIA GT Championship. It took place at the Brno Circuit, Czech Republic, on 25 May 2003.

== Official results ==
Class winners in bold. Cars failing to complete 70% of winner's distance marked as Not Classified (NC).

Pos	Class	No	Team	Drivers	Chassis	Tyre	Laps
Pos	Class	No	Team	Drivers	Engine	Tyre	Laps
1	**GT**	**23**	**(Italy) BMS Scuderia Italia**	**(Italy) Matteo Bobbi (Italy) Thomas Biagi**	**Ferrari 550-GTS Maranello**	MI	**87**
1	**GT**	**23**	**(Italy) BMS Scuderia Italia**	**(Italy) Matteo Bobbi (Italy) Thomas Biagi**	**Ferrari 5.9L V12**	MI	**87**
2	GT	15	(United Kingdom) Lister Storm Racing	(Italy) Andrea Piccini (Switzerland) Jean-Denis Délétraz	Lister Storm	D	87
2	GT	15	(United Kingdom) Lister Storm Racing	(Italy) Andrea Piccini (Switzerland) Jean-Denis Délétraz	Jaguar 7.0L V12	D	87
3	GT	22	(Italy) BMS Scuderia Italia	(Italy) Fabrizio Gollin (Italy) Luca Cappellari	Ferrari 550-GTS Maranello	MI	87
3	GT	22	(Italy) BMS Scuderia Italia	(Italy) Fabrizio Gollin (Italy) Luca Cappellari	Ferrari 5.9L V12	MI	87
4	GT	14	(United Kingdom) Lister Storm Racing	(United Kingdom) Jamie Campbell-Walter (United Kingdom) Nathan Kinch	Lister Storm	D	87
4	GT	14	(United Kingdom) Lister Storm Racing	(United Kingdom) Jamie Campbell-Walter (United Kingdom) Nathan Kinch	Jaguar 7.0L V12	D	87
5	GT	21	(United Kingdom) Care Racing (Italy) BMS Scuderia Italia	(Italy) Stefano Livio (Switzerland) Lilian Bryner (Switzerland) Enzo Calderari	Ferrari 550-GTS Maranello	MI	87
5	GT	21	(United Kingdom) Care Racing (Italy) BMS Scuderia Italia	(Italy) Stefano Livio (Switzerland) Lilian Bryner (Switzerland) Enzo Calderari	Ferrari 5.9L V12	MI	87
6	GT	6	(United Kingdom) Creation Autosportif	(United Kingdom) Bobby Verdon-Roe (Italy) Marco Zadra	Lister Storm	D	86
6	GT	6	(United Kingdom) Creation Autosportif	(United Kingdom) Bobby Verdon-Roe (Italy) Marco Zadra	Jaguar 7.0L V12	D	86
7	GT	8	(United Kingdom) Graham Nash Motorsport	(Portugal) Miguel Ramos (Portugal) Ni Amorim (Portugal) Pedro Chaves	Saleen S7-R	D	84
7	GT	8	(United Kingdom) Graham Nash Motorsport	(Portugal) Miguel Ramos (Portugal) Ni Amorim (Portugal) Pedro Chaves	Ford 7.0L V8	D	84
8	**N-GT**	**50**	**(Germany) Freisinger Motorsport**	**(Germany) Marc Lieb (France) Stéphane Ortelli**	**Porsche 911 GT3-RS**	D	**84**
8	**N-GT**	**50**	**(Germany) Freisinger Motorsport**	**(Germany) Marc Lieb (France) Stéphane Ortelli**	**Porsche 3.6L Flat-6**	D	**84**
9	N-GT	52	(France) JMB Racing	(Italy) Andrea Bertolini (Italy) Fabrizio de Simone	Ferrari 360 Modena GT	P	84
9	N-GT	52	(France) JMB Racing	(Italy) Andrea Bertolini (Italy) Fabrizio de Simone	Ferrari 3.6L V8	P	84
10	N-GT	88	(United Kingdom) Team Maranello Concessionaires	(United Kingdom) Tim Mullen (United Kingdom) Jamie Davies	Ferrari 360 Modena GT	D	84
10	N-GT	88	(United Kingdom) Team Maranello Concessionaires	(United Kingdom) Tim Mullen (United Kingdom) Jamie Davies	Ferrari 3.6L V8	D	84
11	N-GT	61	(United Kingdom) EMKA Racing	(United Kingdom) Martin Short (United Kingdom) Tim Sugden	Porsche 911 GT3-R	D	84
11	N-GT	61	(United Kingdom) EMKA Racing	(United Kingdom) Martin Short (United Kingdom) Tim Sugden	Porsche 3.6L Flat-6	D	84
12	GT	11	(Sweden) Roos Optima Racing Team	(Sweden) Henrik Roos (Sweden) Magnus Wallinder	Chrysler Viper GTS-R	D	83
12	GT	11	(Sweden) Roos Optima Racing Team	(Sweden) Henrik Roos (Sweden) Magnus Wallinder	Chrysler 8.0L V10	D	83
13	N-GT	57	(Czech Republic) MenX	(Czech Republic) Tomáš Enge (Czech Republic) Robert Pergl	Ferrari 360 Modena GT	D	83
13	N-GT	57	(Czech Republic) MenX	(Czech Republic) Tomáš Enge (Czech Republic) Robert Pergl	Ferrari 3.6L V8	D	83
14	N-GT	51	(Germany) Freisinger Motorsport	(Belgium) Bert Longin (Switzerland) Gabriele Gardel	Porsche 911 GT3-RS	D	83
14	N-GT	51	(Germany) Freisinger Motorsport	(Belgium) Bert Longin (Switzerland) Gabriele Gardel	Porsche 3.6L Flat-6	D	83
15	GT	2	(Germany) Konrad Motorsport	(Austria) Franz Konrad (Switzerland) Toni Seiler (France) Jean-Marc Gounon	Saleen S7-R	D	83
15	GT	2	(Germany) Konrad Motorsport	(Austria) Franz Konrad (Switzerland) Toni Seiler (France) Jean-Marc Gounon	Ford 7.0L V8	D	83
16	N-GT	75	(United Kingdom) Team Eurotech	(United Kingdom) David Jones (United Kingdom) Godfrey Jones	Porsche 911 GT3-R	D	82
16	N-GT	75	(United Kingdom) Team Eurotech	(United Kingdom) David Jones (United Kingdom) Godfrey Jones	Porsche 3.6L Flat-6	D	82
17	N-GT	74	(United Kingdom) Team Eurotech	(United Kingdom) Mike Jordan (United Kingdom) Mark Sumpter	Porsche 911 GT3-RS	D	81
17	N-GT	74	(United Kingdom) Team Eurotech	(United Kingdom) Mike Jordan (United Kingdom) Mark Sumpter	Porsche 3.6L Flat-6	D	81
18	N-GT	69	(Germany) Proton Competition	(Germany) Christian Ried (Germany) Gerold Ried	Porsche 911 GT3-RS	D	79
18	N-GT	69	(Germany) Proton Competition	(Germany) Christian Ried (Germany) Gerold Ried	Porsche 3.6L Flat-6	D	79
19	N-GT	89	(United Kingdom) Team Maranello Concessionaires	(United Kingdom) Darren Turner (United Kingdom) Kelvin Burt	Ferrari 360 Modena N-GT	D	79
19	N-GT	89	(United Kingdom) Team Maranello Concessionaires	(United Kingdom) Darren Turner (United Kingdom) Kelvin Burt	Ferrari 3.6L V8	D	79
20	N-GT	53	(France) JMB Racing	(France) Antoine Gosse (Netherlands) Peter Kutemann	Ferrari 360 Modena N-GT	P	78
20	N-GT	53	(France) JMB Racing	(France) Antoine Gosse (Netherlands) Peter Kutemann	Ferrari 3.6L V8	P	78
21	N-GT	56	(Poland) Alda Motorsport	(Poland) Andrzej Dziurka (Poland) Wojciech Dobrzanski	Porsche 911 GT3-RS	D	78
21	N-GT	56	(Poland) Alda Motorsport	(Poland) Andrzej Dziurka (Poland) Wojciech Dobrzanski	Porsche 3.6L Flat-6	D	78
22	N-GT	99	(Germany) RWS Yukos Motorsport	(Austria) Walter Lechner, Jr. (France) Stéphane Daoudi	Porsche 911 GT3-R	P	72
22	N-GT	99	(Germany) RWS Yukos Motorsport	(Austria) Walter Lechner, Jr. (France) Stéphane Daoudi	Porsche 3.6L Flat-6	P	72
23	GT	18	(Netherlands) Zwaan's Racing	(Netherlands) Arjan van der Zwaan (Netherlands) Rob van der Zwaan (Germany) Klaus Abbelen	Chrysler Viper GTS-R	D	61
23	GT	18	(Netherlands) Zwaan's Racing	(Netherlands) Arjan van der Zwaan (Netherlands) Rob van der Zwaan (Germany) Klaus Abbelen	Chrysler 8.0L V10	D	61
24	GT	16	(Germany) Wieth Racing	(Germany) Wolfgang Kaufmann (Germany) Niko Wieth	Ferrari 550 Maranello	D	61
24	GT	16	(Germany) Wieth Racing	(Germany) Wolfgang Kaufmann (Germany) Niko Wieth	Ferrari 6.0L V12	D	61
25 DNF	N-GT	58	(France) Auto Palace Compétition	(France) Steeve Hiesse (France) Guillaume Gomez	Ferrari 360 Modena GT	P	52
25 DNF	N-GT	58	(France) Auto Palace Compétition	(France) Steeve Hiesse (France) Guillaume Gomez	Ferrari 3.6L V8	P	52
26 DNF	GT	4	(Switzerland) Force One Racing Festina	(France) Philippe Alliot (France) David Hallyday (Switzerland) Steve Zacchia	Chrysler Viper GTS-R	P	33
26 DNF	GT	4	(Switzerland) Force One Racing Festina	(France) Philippe Alliot (France) David Hallyday (Switzerland) Steve Zacchia	Chrysler 8.0L V10	P	33
27 DNF	N-GT	54	(United Kingdom) Cirtek Motorsport	(United Kingdom) Ian Khan (United Kingdom) Mark Mayall	Porsche 911 GT3-R	D	31
27 DNF	N-GT	54	(United Kingdom) Cirtek Motorsport	(United Kingdom) Ian Khan (United Kingdom) Mark Mayall	Porsche 3.6L Flat-6	D	31
28 DNF	GT	5	(Switzerland) Force One Racing Festina (Netherlands) Carsport Holland	(Netherlands) Mike Hezemans (Belgium) Anthony Kumpen	Chrysler Viper GTS-R	P	30
28 DNF	GT	5	(Switzerland) Force One Racing Festina (Netherlands) Carsport Holland	(Netherlands) Mike Hezemans (Belgium) Anthony Kumpen	Chrysler 8.0L V10	P	30
29 DNF	GT	9	(France) JMB Racing	(Austria) Philipp Peter (Italy) Fabio Babini	Ferrari 550 Maranello	P	27
29 DNF	GT	9	(France) JMB Racing	(Austria) Philipp Peter (Italy) Fabio Babini	Ferrari 6.0L V12	P	27
30 DNF	GT	12	(Germany) Proton Competition	(Italy) Mauro Casadei (Italy) Moreno Soli (Poland) Maciej Marcinkiewicz	Porsche 911 GT2	Y	17
30 DNF	GT	12	(Germany) Proton Competition	(Italy) Mauro Casadei (Italy) Moreno Soli (Poland) Maciej Marcinkiewicz	Porsche 3.6L Turbo Flat-6	Y	17
31 DNF	N-GT	77	(Germany) RWS Yukos Motorsport	(Russia) Nikolai Fomenko (Russia) Alexey Vasilyev	Porsche 911 GT3-RS	P	8
31 DNF	N-GT	77	(Germany) RWS Yukos Motorsport	(Russia) Nikolai Fomenko (Russia) Alexey Vasilyev	Porsche 3.6L Flat-6	P	8
32 DNF	GT	10	(France) JMB Racing	(France) Boris Derichebourg (France) David Terrien (Italy) Christian Pescatori	Ferrari 550 Maranello	P	0
32 DNF	GT	10	(France) JMB Racing	(France) Boris Derichebourg (France) David Terrien (Italy) Christian Pescatori	Ferrari 6.0L V12	P	0
DSQ^{†}	GT	7	(United Kingdom) Graham Nash Motorsport	(United Kingdom) Mike Newton (Brazil) Thomas Erdos	Saleen S7-R	D	86
DSQ^{†}	GT	7	(United Kingdom) Graham Nash Motorsport	(United Kingdom) Mike Newton (Brazil) Thomas Erdos	Ford 7.0L V8	D	86

† – #8 Graham Nash Motorsport was disqualified for failing post-race technical inspection. The car was found to have a fuel tank larger than regulations allowed.

== Statistics ==
- Pole position – #2 Konrad Motorsport – 1:56.695
- Fastest lap – #2 Konrad Motorsport – 1:59.171
- Average speed – 155.140 km/h

FIA GT Championship
Previous race: 2003 FIA GT Pergusa 500km	2003 season	Next race: 2003 FIA GT Donington 500km
