= 2003 FIA GT Estoril 500km =

Layout of the Autódromo do Estoril

The 2003 FIA GT Estoril 500 km was the ninth round the 2003 FIA GT Championship. It took place at the Autódromo do Estoril, Portugal, on 5 October 2003.

== Official results ==
Class winners in bold. Cars failing to complete 70% of winner's distance marked as Not Classified (NC).

Pos	Class	No	Team	Drivers	Chassis	Tyre	Laps
Pos	Class	No	Team	Drivers	Engine	Tyre	Laps
1	**GT**	**9**	**(France) JMB Racing**	**(Austria) Philipp Peter (Italy) Fabio Babini**	**Ferrari 575-GTC Maranello**	P	**106**
1	**GT**	**9**	**(France) JMB Racing**	**(Austria) Philipp Peter (Italy) Fabio Babini**	**Ferrari 6.0L V12**	P	**106**
2	GT	22	(Italy) BMS Scuderia Italia	(Italy) Fabrizio Gollin (Italy) Luca Cappellari	Ferrari 550-GTS Maranello	MI	106
2	GT	22	(Italy) BMS Scuderia Italia	(Italy) Fabrizio Gollin (Italy) Luca Cappellari	Ferrari 5.9L V12	MI	106
3	GT	23	(Italy) BMS Scuderia Italia	(Italy) Matteo Bobbi (Italy) Thomas Biagi	Ferrari 550-GTS Maranello	MI	106
3	GT	23	(Italy) BMS Scuderia Italia	(Italy) Matteo Bobbi (Italy) Thomas Biagi	Ferrari 5.9L V12	MI	106
4	GT	2	(Germany) Konrad Motorsport	(Austria) Franz Konrad (Austria) Walter Lechner, Jr. (Switzerland) Toni Seiler	Saleen S7-R	D	104
4	GT	2	(Germany) Konrad Motorsport	(Austria) Franz Konrad (Austria) Walter Lechner, Jr. (Switzerland) Toni Seiler	Ford 7.0L V8	D	104
5	GT	18	(Netherlands) Zwaan's Racing	(Netherlands) Arjan van der Zwaan (Netherlands) Rob van der Zwaan (Germany) Klaus Abbelen	Chrysler Viper GTS-R	D	104
5	GT	18	(Netherlands) Zwaan's Racing	(Netherlands) Arjan van der Zwaan (Netherlands) Rob van der Zwaan (Germany) Klaus Abbelen	Chrysler 8.0L V10	D	104
6	GT	11	(Sweden) Roos Optima Racing Team	(Sweden) Henrik Roos (Sweden) Magnus Wallinder	Chrysler Viper GTS-R	D	104
6	GT	11	(Sweden) Roos Optima Racing Team	(Sweden) Henrik Roos (Sweden) Magnus Wallinder	Chrysler 8.0L V10	D	104
7	GT	7	(United Kingdom) Graham Nash Motorsport	(United Kingdom) Mike Newton (Brazil) Thomas Erdos	Saleen S7-R	D	103
7	GT	7	(United Kingdom) Graham Nash Motorsport	(United Kingdom) Mike Newton (Brazil) Thomas Erdos	Ford 7.0L V8	D	103
8	**N-GT**	**52**	**(France) JMB Racing**	**(Italy) Andrea Bertolini (Italy) Fabrizio de Simone**	**Ferrari 360 Modena GT**	P	**103**
8	**N-GT**	**52**	**(France) JMB Racing**	**(Italy) Andrea Bertolini (Italy) Fabrizio de Simone**	**Ferrari 3.6L V8**	P	**103**
9	N-GT	88	(United Kingdom) Team Maranello Concessionaires	(United Kingdom) Darren Turner (United Kingdom) Jamie Davies	Ferrari 360 Modena N-GT	D	103
9	N-GT	88	(United Kingdom) Team Maranello Concessionaires	(United Kingdom) Darren Turner (United Kingdom) Jamie Davies	Ferrari 3.6L V8	D	103
10	N-GT	61	(United Kingdom) EMKA Racing	(France) Emmanuel Collard (United Kingdom) Tim Sugden	Porsche 911 GT3-R	D	102
10	N-GT	61	(United Kingdom) EMKA Racing	(France) Emmanuel Collard (United Kingdom) Tim Sugden	Porsche 3.6L Flat-6	D	102
11	GT	8	(United Kingdom) Graham Nash Motorsport	(Portugal) Ni Amorim (Portugal) Miguel Ramos (Portugal) António Coimbra	Saleen S7-R	D	102
11	GT	8	(United Kingdom) Graham Nash Motorsport	(Portugal) Ni Amorim (Portugal) Miguel Ramos (Portugal) António Coimbra	Ford 7.0L V8	D	102
12	N-GT	50	(Germany) Freisinger Motorsport	(Germany) Marc Lieb (France) Stéphane Ortelli	Porsche 911 GT3-RS	D	101
12	N-GT	50	(Germany) Freisinger Motorsport	(Germany) Marc Lieb (France) Stéphane Ortelli	Porsche 3.6L Flat-6	D	101
13	N-GT	57	(Czech Republic) MenX	(Czech Republic) Jaroslav Janiš (Czech Republic) Robert Pergl	Ferrari 360 Modena GT	D	101
13	N-GT	57	(Czech Republic) MenX	(Czech Republic) Jaroslav Janiš (Czech Republic) Robert Pergl	Ferrari 3.6L V8	D	101
14	N-GT	74	(United Kingdom) Team Eurotech	(United Kingdom) Mike Jordan (United Kingdom) Mark Sumpter	Porsche 911 GT3-RS	D	114
14	N-GT	74	(United Kingdom) Team Eurotech	(United Kingdom) Mike Jordan (United Kingdom) Mark Sumpter	Porsche 3.6L Flat-6	D	114
15	N-GT	85	(Germany) JVG Racing	(United Kingdom) Ian Khan (United Kingdom) Mark Mayall	Porsche 911 GT3-R	P	99
15	N-GT	85	(Germany) JVG Racing	(United Kingdom) Ian Khan (United Kingdom) Mark Mayall	Porsche 3.6L Flat-6	P	99
16	N-GT	66	(Italy) Autorlando Sport	(Italy) Diego Alessi (Italy) Maurizio Mediani (Italy) Edy Gay	Porsche 911 GT3-RS	P	97
16	N-GT	66	(Italy) Autorlando Sport	(Italy) Diego Alessi (Italy) Maurizio Mediani (Italy) Edy Gay	Porsche 3.6L Flat-6	P	97
17	N-GT	89	(United Kingdom) Team Maranello Concessionaires	(United Kingdom) Kelvin Burt (United Kingdom) Tim Mullen	Ferrari 360 Modena GT	D	95
17	N-GT	89	(United Kingdom) Team Maranello Concessionaires	(United Kingdom) Kelvin Burt (United Kingdom) Tim Mullen	Ferrari 3.6L V8	D	95
18	N-GT	99	(Germany) RWS Yukos Motorsport	(Austria) Toto Wolff (France) Stéphane Daoudi	Porsche 911 GT3-RS	P	95
18	N-GT	99	(Germany) RWS Yukos Motorsport	(Austria) Toto Wolff (France) Stéphane Daoudi	Porsche 3.6L Flat-6	P	95
19	N-GT	53	(France) JMB Racing	(Netherlands) Peter Kutemann (France) Antoine Gosse	Ferrari 360 Modena N-GT	P	94
19	N-GT	53	(France) JMB Racing	(Netherlands) Peter Kutemann (France) Antoine Gosse	Ferrari 3.6L V8	P	94
20	N-GT	51	(Germany) Freisinger Motorsport	(Belgium) Bert Longin (Switzerland) Gabriele Gardel	Porsche 911 GT3-RS	D	91
20	N-GT	51	(Germany) Freisinger Motorsport	(Belgium) Bert Longin (Switzerland) Gabriele Gardel	Porsche 3.6L Flat-6	D	91
21	N-GT	77	(Germany) RWS Yukos Motorsport	(Russia) Nikolai Fomenko (Russia) Alexey Vasilyev	Porsche 911 GT3-RS	P	89
21	N-GT	77	(Germany) RWS Yukos Motorsport	(Russia) Nikolai Fomenko (Russia) Alexey Vasilyev	Porsche 3.6L Flat-6	P	89
22	GT	21	(United Kingdom) Care Racing (Italy) BMS Scuderia Italia	(Italy) Stefano Livio (Switzerland) Lilian Bryner (Switzerland) Enzo Calderari	Ferrari 550-GTS Maranello	MI	85
22	GT	21	(United Kingdom) Care Racing (Italy) BMS Scuderia Italia	(Italy) Stefano Livio (Switzerland) Lilian Bryner (Switzerland) Enzo Calderari	Ferrari 5.9L V12	MI	85
23 DNF	GT	10	(France) JMB Racing	(France) Boris Derichebourg (Italy) Christian Pescatori	Ferrari 575-GTC Maranello	P	61
23 DNF	GT	10	(France) JMB Racing	(France) Boris Derichebourg (Italy) Christian Pescatori	Ferrari 6.0L V12	P	61
24 DNF	GT	5	(Switzerland) Force One Racing Festina (Netherlands) Carsport Holland	(Netherlands) Mike Hezemans (Belgium) Anthony Kumpen (France) Philippe Alliot	Chrysler Viper GTS-R	P	59
24 DNF	GT	5	(Switzerland) Force One Racing Festina (Netherlands) Carsport Holland	(Netherlands) Mike Hezemans (Belgium) Anthony Kumpen (France) Philippe Alliot	Chrysler 8.0L V10	P	59
25 DNF	GT	15	(United Kingdom) Lister Storm Racing	(Italy) Andrea Piccini (Belgium) David Sterckx	Lister Storm	D	49
25 DNF	GT	15	(United Kingdom) Lister Storm Racing	(Italy) Andrea Piccini (Belgium) David Sterckx	Jaguar 7.0L V12	D	49
26 DNF	N-GT	70	(Italy) Yellow Racing	(Italy) Fabio Venier (Portugal) Pedro Névoa	Ferrari 360 Challenge	P	43
26 DNF	N-GT	70	(Italy) Yellow Racing	(Italy) Fabio Venier (Portugal) Pedro Névoa	Ferrari 3.6L V8	P	43
27 DNF	GT	14	(United Kingdom) Lister Storm Racing	(United Kingdom) Jamie Campbell-Walter (United Kingdom) Nathan Kinch	Lister Storm	D	38
27 DNF	GT	14	(United Kingdom) Lister Storm Racing	(United Kingdom) Jamie Campbell-Walter (United Kingdom) Nathan Kinch	Jaguar 7.0L V12	D	38
28 DNF	N-GT	75	(United Kingdom) Team Eurotech	(United Kingdom) Godfrey Jones (United Kingdom) David Jones	Porsche 911 GT3-RS	D	38
28 DNF	N-GT	75	(United Kingdom) Team Eurotech	(United Kingdom) Godfrey Jones (United Kingdom) David Jones	Porsche 3.6L Flat-6	D	38
29 DNF	GT	16	(Germany) Wieth Racing	(Germany) Wolfgang Kaufmann (Germany) Niko Wieth	Ferrari 550 Maranello	D	34
29 DNF	GT	16	(Germany) Wieth Racing	(Germany) Wolfgang Kaufmann (Germany) Niko Wieth	Ferrari 6.0L V12	D	34
30 DNF	N-GT	69	(Germany) Proton Competition	(Germany) Christian Ried (Germany) Gerold Ried	Porsche 911 GT3-RS	D	9
30 DNF	N-GT	69	(Germany) Proton Competition	(Germany) Christian Ried (Germany) Gerold Ried	Porsche 3.6L Flat-6	D	9
31 DNF	GT	6	(United Kingdom) Creation Autosportif	(United Kingdom) Bobby Verdon-Roe (Italy) Marco Zadra	Lister Storm	D	3
31 DNF	GT	6	(United Kingdom) Creation Autosportif	(United Kingdom) Bobby Verdon-Roe (Italy) Marco Zadra	Jaguar 7.0L V12	D	3
DNS	GT	19	(United Kingdom) Creation Autosportif	(United Kingdom) Paul Knapfield (France) Jean-Marc Gounon	Lister Storm	D	–
DNS	GT	19	(United Kingdom) Creation Autosportif	(United Kingdom) Paul Knapfield (France) Jean-Marc Gounon	Jaguar 7.0L V12	D	–

== Statistics ==
- Pole position – #5 Force One Racing Festina – 1:36.222
- Fastest lap – #22 BMS Scuderia Italia – 1:37.708
- Average speed – 147.120 km/h

FIA GT Championship
Previous race: 2003 FIA GT Oschersleben 500km	2003 season	Next race: 2003 FIA GT Monza 500km
