= 2003 FIA GT Pergusa 500km =

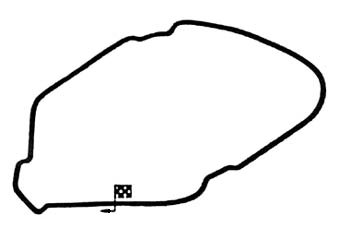
Layout of the Autodromo di Pergusa

The 2003 FIA GT Pergusa 500 km was the third round the 2003 FIA GT Championship. It took place at the Autodromo di Pergusa, Italy, on 11 May 2003.

== Official results ==
Class winners in bold. Cars failing to complete 70% of winner's distance marked as Not Classified (NC).

| Pos | Class | No | Team | Drivers | Chassis | Tyre | Laps |
| Pos | Class | No | Team | Drivers | Engine | Tyre | Laps |
|---|---|---|---|---|---|---|---|
| 1 | **GT** | **23** | **(Italy) BMS Scuderia Italia** | **(Italy) Matteo Bobbi (Italy) Thomas Biagi** | **Ferrari 550-GTS Maranello** | MI | **102** |
| 1 | **GT** | **23** | **(Italy) BMS Scuderia Italia** | **(Italy) Matteo Bobbi (Italy) Thomas Biagi** | **Ferrari 5.9L V12** | MI | **102** |
| 2 | GT | 14 | (United Kingdom) Lister Storm Racing | (United Kingdom) Jamie Campbell-Walter (United Kingdom) Nathan Kinch | Lister Storm | D | 102 |
| 2 | GT | 14 | (United Kingdom) Lister Storm Racing | (United Kingdom) Jamie Campbell-Walter (United Kingdom) Nathan Kinch | Jaguar 7.0L V12 | D | 102 |
| 3 | GT | 21 | (United Kingdom) Care Racing (Italy) BMS Scuderia Italia | (Italy) Stefano Livio (Switzerland) Lilian Bryner (Switzerland) Enzo Calderari | Ferrari 550-GTS Maranello | MI | 101 |
| 3 | GT | 21 | (United Kingdom) Care Racing (Italy) BMS Scuderia Italia | (Italy) Stefano Livio (Switzerland) Lilian Bryner (Switzerland) Enzo Calderari | Ferrari 5.9L V12 | MI | 101 |
| 4 | GT | 6 | (United Kingdom) Creation Autosportif | (United Kingdom) Bobby Verdon-Roe (Italy) Marco Zadra | Lister Storm | D | 101 |
| 4 | GT | 6 | (United Kingdom) Creation Autosportif | (United Kingdom) Bobby Verdon-Roe (Italy) Marco Zadra | Jaguar 7.0L V12 | D | 101 |
| 5 | GT | 15 | (United Kingdom) Lister Storm Racing | (Italy) Andrea Piccini (Switzerland) Jean-Denis Délétraz | Lister Storm | D | 100 |
| 5 | GT | 15 | (United Kingdom) Lister Storm Racing | (Italy) Andrea Piccini (Switzerland) Jean-Denis Délétraz | Jaguar 7.0L V12 | D | 100 |
| 6 | GT | 4 | (Switzerland) Force One Racing Festina | (France) Philippe Alliot (Switzerland) Steve Zacchia | Chrysler Viper GTS-R | P | 99 |
| 6 | GT | 4 | (Switzerland) Force One Racing Festina | (France) Philippe Alliot (Switzerland) Steve Zacchia | Chrysler 8.0L V10 | P | 99 |
| 7 | **N-GT** | **61** | **(United Kingdom) EMKA Racing** | **(United Kingdom) Martin Short (United Kingdom) Tim Sugden** | **Porsche 911 GT3-R** | D | **99** |
| 7 | **N-GT** | **61** | **(United Kingdom) EMKA Racing** | **(United Kingdom) Martin Short (United Kingdom) Tim Sugden** | **Porsche 3.6L Flat-6** | D | **99** |
| 8 | N-GT | 52 | (France) JMB Racing | (Italy) Andrea Bertolini (Italy) Fabrizio de Simone | Ferrari 360 Modena GT | P | 99 |
| 8 | N-GT | 52 | (France) JMB Racing | (Italy) Andrea Bertolini (Italy) Fabrizio de Simone | Ferrari 3.6L V8 | P | 99 |
| 9 | GT | 8 | (United Kingdom) Graham Nash Motorsport | (Portugal) Miguel Ramos (Portugal) Ni Amorim (Portugal) Pedro Chaves | Saleen S7-R | D | 97 |
| 9 | GT | 8 | (United Kingdom) Graham Nash Motorsport | (Portugal) Miguel Ramos (Portugal) Ni Amorim (Portugal) Pedro Chaves | Ford 7.0L V8 | D | 97 |
| 10 | N-GT | 75 | (United Kingdom) Team Eurotech | (United Kingdom) David Jones (United Kingdom) Godfrey Jones | Porsche 911 GT3-R | D | 97 |
| 10 | N-GT | 75 | (United Kingdom) Team Eurotech | (United Kingdom) David Jones (United Kingdom) Godfrey Jones | Porsche 3.6L Flat-6 | D | 97 |
| 11 | GT | 18 | (Netherlands) Zwaan's Racing | (Netherlands) Arjan van der Zwaan (Netherlands) Rob van der Zwaan (Germany) Klaus Abbelen | Chrysler Viper GTS-R | D | 96 |
| 11 | GT | 18 | (Netherlands) Zwaan's Racing | (Netherlands) Arjan van der Zwaan (Netherlands) Rob van der Zwaan (Germany) Klaus Abbelen | Chrysler 8.0L V10 | D | 96 |
| 12 | N-GT | 77 | (Germany) RWS Yukos Motorsport | (Russia) Nikolai Fomenko (Russia) Alexey Vasilyev | Porsche 911 GT3-RS | P | 95 |
| 12 | N-GT | 77 | (Germany) RWS Yukos Motorsport | (Russia) Nikolai Fomenko (Russia) Alexey Vasilyev | Porsche 3.6L Flat-6 | P | 95 |
| 13 | N-GT | 56 | (Poland) Alda Motorsport | (Poland) Andrzej Dziurka (Poland) Wojciech Dobrzanski | Porsche 911 GT3-RS | D | 95 |
| 13 | N-GT | 56 | (Poland) Alda Motorsport | (Poland) Andrzej Dziurka (Poland) Wojciech Dobrzanski | Porsche 3.6L Flat-6 | D | 95 |
| 14 | N-GT | 53 | (France) JMB Racing | (France) Antoine Gosse (Netherlands) Peter Kutemann | Ferrari 360 Modena N-GT | P | 94 |
| 14 | N-GT | 53 | (France) JMB Racing | (France) Antoine Gosse (Netherlands) Peter Kutemann | Ferrari 3.6L V8 | P | 94 |
| 15 | N-GT | 88 | (United Kingdom) Team Maranello Concessionaires | (United Kingdom) Tim Mullen (United Kingdom) Jamie Davies | Ferrari 360 Modena GT | D | 84 |
| 15 | N-GT | 88 | (United Kingdom) Team Maranello Concessionaires | (United Kingdom) Tim Mullen (United Kingdom) Jamie Davies | Ferrari 3.6L V8 | D | 84 |
| 16 | N-GT | 89 | (United Kingdom) Team Maranello Concessionaires | (United Kingdom) Darren Turner (United Kingdom) Kelvin Burt | Ferrari 360 Modena N-GT | D | 81 |
| 16 | N-GT | 89 | (United Kingdom) Team Maranello Concessionaires | (United Kingdom) Darren Turner (United Kingdom) Kelvin Burt | Ferrari 3.6L V8 | D | 81 |
| 17 DNF | GT | 2 | (Germany) Konrad Motorsport | (Austria) Franz Konrad (Switzerland) Toni Seiler (France) Jean-Marc Gounon | Saleen S7-R | D | 65 |
| 17 DNF | GT | 2 | (Germany) Konrad Motorsport | (Austria) Franz Konrad (Switzerland) Toni Seiler (France) Jean-Marc Gounon | Ford 7.0L V8 | D | 65 |
| 18 DNF | N-GT | 58 | (France) Auto Palace Compétition | (France) Steeve Hiesse (France) Guillaume Gomez | Ferrari 360 Modena GT | P | 45 |
| 18 DNF | N-GT | 58 | (France) Auto Palace Compétition | (France) Steeve Hiesse (France) Guillaume Gomez | Ferrari 3.6L V8 | P | 45 |
| 19 DNF | N-GT | 74 | (United Kingdom) Team Eurotech | (United Kingdom) Mike Jordan (United Kingdom) Mark Sumpter | Porsche 911 GT3-RS | D | 45 |
| 19 DNF | N-GT | 74 | (United Kingdom) Team Eurotech | (United Kingdom) Mike Jordan (United Kingdom) Mark Sumpter | Porsche 3.6L Flat-6 | D | 45 |
| 20 DNF | GT | 9 | (France) JMB Racing | (Austria) Philipp Peter (Italy) Fabio Babini | Ferrari 550 Maranello | P | 41 |
| 20 DNF | GT | 9 | (France) JMB Racing | (Austria) Philipp Peter (Italy) Fabio Babini | Ferrari 6.0L V12 | P | 41 |
| 21 DNF | N-GT | 51 | (Germany) Freisinger Motorsport | (Belgium) Bert Longin (Switzerland) Gabriele Gardel | Porsche 911 GT3-RS | D | 40 |
| 21 DNF | N-GT | 51 | (Germany) Freisinger Motorsport | (Belgium) Bert Longin (Switzerland) Gabriele Gardel | Porsche 3.6L Flat-6 | D | 40 |
| 22 DNF | N-GT | 57 | (Czech Republic) MenX | (Czech Republic) Tomáš Enge (Czech Republic) Robert Pergl | Ferrari 360 Modena GT | D | 39 |
| 22 DNF | N-GT | 57 | (Czech Republic) MenX | (Czech Republic) Tomáš Enge (Czech Republic) Robert Pergl | Ferrari 3.6L V8 | D | 39 |
| 23 DNF | N-GT | 99 | (Germany) RWS Yukos Motorsport | (Austria) Walter Lechner Jr. (France) Stéphane Daoudi | Porsche 911 GT3-R | P | 23 |
| 23 DNF | N-GT | 99 | (Germany) RWS Yukos Motorsport | (Austria) Walter Lechner Jr. (France) Stéphane Daoudi | Porsche 3.6L Flat-6 | P | 23 |
| 24 DNF | GT | 16 | (Germany) Wieth Racing | (Germany) Wolfgang Kaufmann (Germany) Niko Wieth (Italy) Vittorio Zoboli | Ferrari 550 Maranello | D | 18 |
| 24 DNF | GT | 16 | (Germany) Wieth Racing | (Germany) Wolfgang Kaufmann (Germany) Niko Wieth (Italy) Vittorio Zoboli | Ferrari 6.0L V12 | D | 18 |
| 25 DNF | N-GT | 50 | (Germany) Freisinger Motorsport | (Germany) Marc Lieb (France) Stéphane Ortelli | Porsche 911 GT3-RS | D | 16 |
| 25 DNF | N-GT | 50 | (Germany) Freisinger Motorsport | (Germany) Marc Lieb (France) Stéphane Ortelli | Porsche 3.6L Flat-6 | D | 16 |
| 26 DNF | GT | 10 | (France) JMB Racing | (France) Boris Derichebourg (France) David Terrien (Italy) Christian Pescatori | Ferrari 550 Maranello | P | 14 |
| 26 DNF | GT | 10 | (France) JMB Racing | (France) Boris Derichebourg (France) David Terrien (Italy) Christian Pescatori | Ferrari 6.0L V12 | P | 14 |
| 27 DNF | GT | 11 | (Sweden) Roos Optima Racing Team | (Sweden) Henrik Roos (Sweden) Magnus Wallinder | Chrysler Viper GTS-R | D | 11 |
| 27 DNF | GT | 11 | (Sweden) Roos Optima Racing Team | (Sweden) Henrik Roos (Sweden) Magnus Wallinder | Chrysler 8.0L V10 | D | 11 |
| 28 DNF | GT | 12 | (Germany) Proton Competition | (Germany) Christian Ried (Germany) Gerold Ried | Porsche 911 GT2 | Y | 10 |
| 28 DNF | GT | 12 | (Germany) Proton Competition | (Germany) Christian Ried (Germany) Gerold Ried | Porsche 3.6L Turbo Flat-6 | Y | 10 |
| 29 DNF | GT | 5 | (Switzerland) Force One Racing Festina (Netherlands) Carsport Holland | (Netherlands) Mike Hezemans (Belgium) Anthony Kumpen | Chrysler Viper GTS-R | P | 5 |
| 29 DNF | GT | 5 | (Switzerland) Force One Racing Festina (Netherlands) Carsport Holland | (Netherlands) Mike Hezemans (Belgium) Anthony Kumpen | Chrysler 8.0L V10 | P | 5 |
| DSQ^{†} | GT | 22 | (Italy) BMS Scuderia Italia | (Italy) Fabrizio Gollin (Italy) Luca Cappellari | Ferrari 550-GTS Maranello | MI | 102 |
| DSQ^{†} | GT | 22 | (Italy) BMS Scuderia Italia | (Italy) Fabrizio Gollin (Italy) Luca Cappellari | Ferrari 5.9L V12 | MI | 102 |
| DNS | GT | 7 | (United Kingdom) Graham Nash Motorsport | (United Kingdom) Mike Newton (Brazil) Thomas Erdos | Saleen S7-R | D | - |
| DNS | GT | 7 | (United Kingdom) Graham Nash Motorsport | (United Kingdom) Mike Newton (Brazil) Thomas Erdos | Ford 7.0L V8 | D | - |

† - #22 BMS Scuderia Italia was disqualified for failing post-race technical inspection. The car was found to have an airbox which allowed air to leak back out.

== Statistics ==
- Pole position - #2 Konrad Motorsport - 1:34.939
- Fastest lap - #50 Freisinger Motorsport - 1:40.755
- Average speed - 171.320 km/h

FIA GT Championship
| Previous race: 2003 FIA GT Magny-Cours 500km | 2003 season | Next race: 2003 FIA GT Brno 500km |
