= 2003 FIA GT Anderstorp 500km =

Layout of the Anderstorp Raceway

The 2003 FIA GT Anderstorp 500 km was the seventh round the 2003 FIA GT Championship. It took place at the Scandinavian Raceway, Sweden, on 7 September 2003.

== Official results ==
Class winners in bold. Cars failing to complete 70% of winner's distance marked as Not Classified (NC).

Pos	Class	No	Team	Drivers	Chassis	Tyre	Laps
Pos	Class	No	Team	Drivers	Engine	Tyre	Laps
1	**GT**	**14**	**(United Kingdom) Lister Storm Racing**	**(United Kingdom) Jamie Campbell-Walter (United Kingdom) Nathan Kinch**	**Lister Storm**	D	**114**
1	**GT**	**14**	**(United Kingdom) Lister Storm Racing**	**(United Kingdom) Jamie Campbell-Walter (United Kingdom) Nathan Kinch**	**Jaguar 7.0L V12**	D	**114**
2	GT	2	(Germany) Konrad Motorsport	(Austria) Franz Konrad (Austria) Walter Lechner Jr. (Switzerland) Toni Seiler	Saleen S7-R	D	114
2	GT	2	(Germany) Konrad Motorsport	(Austria) Franz Konrad (Austria) Walter Lechner Jr. (Switzerland) Toni Seiler	Ford 7.0L V8	D	114
3	GT	15	(United Kingdom) Lister Storm Racing	(Italy) Andrea Piccini (Belgium) David Sterckx	Lister Storm	D	113
3	GT	15	(United Kingdom) Lister Storm Racing	(Italy) Andrea Piccini (Belgium) David Sterckx	Jaguar 7.0L V12	D	113
4	GT	22	(Italy) BMS Scuderia Italia	(Italy) Fabrizio Gollin (Italy) Luca Cappellari	Ferrari 550-GTS Maranello	MI	113
4	GT	22	(Italy) BMS Scuderia Italia	(Italy) Fabrizio Gollin (Italy) Luca Cappellari	Ferrari 5.9L V12	MI	113
5	GT	21	(United Kingdom) Care Racing (Italy) BMS Scuderia Italia	(Italy) Stefano Livio (Switzerland) Lilian Bryner (Switzerland) Enzo Calderari	Ferrari 550-GTS Maranello	MI	112
5	GT	21	(United Kingdom) Care Racing (Italy) BMS Scuderia Italia	(Italy) Stefano Livio (Switzerland) Lilian Bryner (Switzerland) Enzo Calderari	Ferrari 5.9L V12	MI	112
6	**N-GT**	**61**	**(United Kingdom) EMKA Racing**	**(France) Emmanuel Collard (United Kingdom) Tim Sugden**	**Porsche 911 GT3-R**	D	**111**
6	**N-GT**	**61**	**(United Kingdom) EMKA Racing**	**(France) Emmanuel Collard (United Kingdom) Tim Sugden**	**Porsche 3.6L Flat-6**	D	**111**
7	GT	18	(Netherlands) Zwaan's Racing	(Netherlands) Arjan van der Zwaan (Netherlands) Rob van der Zwaan (Germany) Klaus Abbelen	Chrysler Viper GTS-R	D	111
7	GT	18	(Netherlands) Zwaan's Racing	(Netherlands) Arjan van der Zwaan (Netherlands) Rob van der Zwaan (Germany) Klaus Abbelen	Chrysler 8.0L V10	D	111
8	N-GT	50	(Germany) Freisinger Motorsport	(Germany) Marc Lieb (France) Stéphane Ortelli	Porsche 911 GT3-RS	D	110
8	N-GT	50	(Germany) Freisinger Motorsport	(Germany) Marc Lieb (France) Stéphane Ortelli	Porsche 3.6L Flat-6	D	110
9	N-GT	88	(United Kingdom) Team Maranello Concessionaires	(United Kingdom) Darren Turner (United Kingdom) Jamie Davies	Ferrari 360 Modena N-GT	D	110
9	N-GT	88	(United Kingdom) Team Maranello Concessionaires	(United Kingdom) Darren Turner (United Kingdom) Jamie Davies	Ferrari 3.6L V8	D	110
10	N-GT	99	(Germany) RWS Yukos Motorsport	(United Kingdom) Adam Jones (France) Stéphane Daoudi	Porsche 911 GT3-RS	P	109
10	N-GT	99	(Germany) RWS Yukos Motorsport	(United Kingdom) Adam Jones (France) Stéphane Daoudi	Porsche 3.6L Flat-6	P	109
11	N-GT	51	(Germany) Freisinger Motorsport	(Belgium) Bert Longin (Switzerland) Gabriele Gardel	Porsche 911 GT3-RS	D	109
11	N-GT	51	(Germany) Freisinger Motorsport	(Belgium) Bert Longin (Switzerland) Gabriele Gardel	Porsche 3.6L Flat-6	D	109
12	N-GT	74	(United Kingdom) Team Eurotech	(United Kingdom) Mark Mayall (Germany) Jürgen von Gartzen	Porsche 911 GT3-RS	D	109
12	N-GT	74	(United Kingdom) Team Eurotech	(United Kingdom) Mark Mayall (Germany) Jürgen von Gartzen	Porsche 3.6L Flat-6	D	109
13	N-GT	57	(Czech Republic) MenX	(Czech Republic) Jaroslav Janiš (Czech Republic) Robert Pergl	Ferrari 360 Modena GT	D	108
13	N-GT	57	(Czech Republic) MenX	(Czech Republic) Jaroslav Janiš (Czech Republic) Robert Pergl	Ferrari 3.6L V8	D	108
14	N-GT	77	(Germany) RWS Yukos Motorsport	(Russia) Nikolai Fomenko (Russia) Alexey Vasilyev	Porsche 911 GT3-RS	P	106
14	N-GT	77	(Germany) RWS Yukos Motorsport	(Russia) Nikolai Fomenko (Russia) Alexey Vasilyev	Porsche 3.6L Flat-6	P	106
15	GT	19	(United Kingdom) Creation Autosportif	(United Kingdom) Paul Knapfield (France) Jean-Marc Gounon	Lister Storm	D	104
15	GT	19	(United Kingdom) Creation Autosportif	(United Kingdom) Paul Knapfield (France) Jean-Marc Gounon	Jaguar 7.0L V12	D	104
16	N-GT	69	(Germany) Proton Competition	(Germany) Christian Ried (Germany) Gerold Ried	Porsche 911 GT3-RS	D	102
16	N-GT	69	(Germany) Proton Competition	(Germany) Christian Ried (Germany) Gerold Ried	Porsche 3.6L Flat-6	D	102
17	N-GT	52	(France) JMB Racing	(Italy) Andrea Bertolini (Italy) Fabrizio de Simone	Ferrari 360 Modena GT	P	102
17	N-GT	52	(France) JMB Racing	(Italy) Andrea Bertolini (Italy) Fabrizio de Simone	Ferrari 3.6L V8	P	102
18	N-GT	53	(France) JMB Racing	(Netherlands) Peter Kutemann (France) Antoine Gosse	Ferrari 360 Modena N-GT	P	102
18	N-GT	53	(France) JMB Racing	(Netherlands) Peter Kutemann (France) Antoine Gosse	Ferrari 3.6L V8	P	102
19	GT	9	(France) JMB Racing	(Austria) Philipp Peter (Italy) Fabio Babini	Ferrari 550 Maranello	P	99
19	GT	9	(France) JMB Racing	(Austria) Philipp Peter (Italy) Fabio Babini	Ferrari 6.0L V12	P	99
20	GT	16	(Germany) Wieth Racing	(Germany) Wolfgang Kaufmann (Sweden) Tony Ring	Ferrari 550 Maranello	D	91
20	GT	16	(Germany) Wieth Racing	(Germany) Wolfgang Kaufmann (Sweden) Tony Ring	Ferrari 6.0L V12	D	91
21	GT	8	(United Kingdom) Graham Nash Motorsport	(Portugal) Ni Amorim (Portugal) Miguel Ramos (Portugal) Pedro Chaves	Saleen S7-R	D	88
21	GT	8	(United Kingdom) Graham Nash Motorsport	(Portugal) Ni Amorim (Portugal) Miguel Ramos (Portugal) Pedro Chaves	Ford 7.0L V8	D	88
22	GT	4	(Switzerland) Force One Racing Festina	(France) Philippe Alliot (Switzerland) Steve Zacchia	Chrysler Viper GTS-R	P	79
22	GT	4	(Switzerland) Force One Racing Festina	(France) Philippe Alliot (Switzerland) Steve Zacchia	Chrysler 8.0L V10	P	79
23 DNF	N-GT	89	(United Kingdom) Team Maranello Concessionaires	(United Kingdom) Kelvin Burt (United Kingdom) Tim Mullen	Ferrari 360 Modena GT	D	64
23 DNF	N-GT	89	(United Kingdom) Team Maranello Concessionaires	(United Kingdom) Kelvin Burt (United Kingdom) Tim Mullen	Ferrari 3.6L V8	D	64
24 DNF	GT	6	(United Kingdom) Creation Autosportif	(United Kingdom) Bobby Verdon-Roe (Italy) Marco Zadra	Lister Storm	D	60
24 DNF	GT	6	(United Kingdom) Creation Autosportif	(United Kingdom) Bobby Verdon-Roe (Italy) Marco Zadra	Jaguar 7.0L V12	D	60
25 DNF	GT	7	(United Kingdom) Graham Nash Motorsport	(United Kingdom) Mike Newton (Brazil) Thomas Erdos	Saleen S7-R	D	49
25 DNF	GT	7	(United Kingdom) Graham Nash Motorsport	(United Kingdom) Mike Newton (Brazil) Thomas Erdos	Ford 7.0L V8	D	49
26 DNF	GT	11	(Sweden) Roos Optima Racing Team	(Sweden) Henrik Roos (Sweden) Magnus Wallinder	Chrysler Viper GTS-R	D	44
26 DNF	GT	11	(Sweden) Roos Optima Racing Team	(Sweden) Henrik Roos (Sweden) Magnus Wallinder	Chrysler 8.0L V10	D	44
27 DNF	GT	5	(Switzerland) Force One Racing Festina (Netherlands) Carsport Holland	(Netherlands) Mike Hezemans (Belgium) Anthony Kumpen	Chrysler Viper GTS-R	P	35
27 DNF	GT	5	(Switzerland) Force One Racing Festina (Netherlands) Carsport Holland	(Netherlands) Mike Hezemans (Belgium) Anthony Kumpen	Chrysler 8.0L V10	P	35
28 DNF	GT	10	(France) JMB Racing	(France) Boris Derichebourg (Italy) Christian Pescatori	Ferrari 550 Maranello	P	13
28 DNF	GT	10	(France) JMB Racing	(France) Boris Derichebourg (Italy) Christian Pescatori	Ferrari 6.0L V12	P	13
29 DNF	GT	23	(Italy) BMS Scuderia Italia	(Italy) Matteo Bobbi (Italy) Thomas Biagi	Ferrari 550-GTS Maranello	MI	0
29 DNF	GT	23	(Italy) BMS Scuderia Italia	(Italy) Matteo Bobbi (Italy) Thomas Biagi	Ferrari 5.9L V12	MI	0

== Statistics ==
- Pole position – #2 Konrad Motorsport – 1:28.899
- Fastest lap – #2 Konrad Motorsport – 1:31.424
- Average speed – 152.700 km/h

FIA GT Championship
Previous race: 2003 Spa 24 Hours	2003 season	Next race: 2003 FIA GT Oschersleben 500km
