= 2003 FIA GT Donington 500km =

Layout of the Donington Park

The 2003 FIA GT Donington 500 km was the fifth round the 2003 FIA GT Championship. It took place at Donington Park, United Kingdom, on 29 June 2003.

== Official results ==
Class winners in bold. Cars failing to complete 70% of winner's distance marked as Not Classified (NC).

Pos	Class	No	Team	Drivers	Chassis	Tyre	Laps
Pos	Class	No	Team	Drivers	Engine	Tyre	Laps
1	**GT**	**23**	**(Italy) BMS Scuderia Italia**	**(Italy) Matteo Bobbi (Italy) Thomas Biagi**	**Ferrari 550-GTS Maranello**	MI	**112**
1	**GT**	**23**	**(Italy) BMS Scuderia Italia**	**(Italy) Matteo Bobbi (Italy) Thomas Biagi**	**Ferrari 5.9L V12**	MI	**112**
2	GT	21	(United Kingdom) Care Racing (Italy) BMS Scuderia Italia	(Italy) Stefano Livio (Switzerland) Lilian Bryner (Switzerland) Enzo Calderari	Ferrari 550-GTS Maranello	MI	111
2	GT	21	(United Kingdom) Care Racing (Italy) BMS Scuderia Italia	(Italy) Stefano Livio (Switzerland) Lilian Bryner (Switzerland) Enzo Calderari	Ferrari 5.9L V12	MI	111
3	GT	4	(Switzerland) Force One Racing Festina	(France) Philippe Alliot (France) David Hallyday (Switzerland) Steve Zacchia	Chrysler Viper GTS-R	P	111
3	GT	4	(Switzerland) Force One Racing Festina	(France) Philippe Alliot (France) David Hallyday (Switzerland) Steve Zacchia	Chrysler 8.0L V10	P	111
4	GT	7	(United Kingdom) Graham Nash Motorsport	(United Kingdom) Mike Newton (Brazil) Thomas Erdos	Saleen S7-R	D	110
4	GT	7	(United Kingdom) Graham Nash Motorsport	(United Kingdom) Mike Newton (Brazil) Thomas Erdos	Ford 7.0L V8	D	110
5	GT	6	(United Kingdom) Creation Autosportif	(United Kingdom) Bobby Verdon-Roe (Italy) Marco Zadra	Lister Storm	D	110
5	GT	6	(United Kingdom) Creation Autosportif	(United Kingdom) Bobby Verdon-Roe (Italy) Marco Zadra	Jaguar 7.0L V12	D	110
6	**N-GT**	**50**	**(Germany) Freisinger Motorsport**	**(Germany) Marc Lieb (France) Stéphane Ortelli**	**Porsche 911 GT3-RS**	D	**109**
6	**N-GT**	**50**	**(Germany) Freisinger Motorsport**	**(Germany) Marc Lieb (France) Stéphane Ortelli**	**Porsche 3.6L Flat-6**	D	**109**
7	GT	2	(Germany) Konrad Motorsport	(Austria) Franz Konrad (Switzerland) Toni Seiler (France) Jean-Marc Gounon	Saleen S7-R	D	109
7	GT	2	(Germany) Konrad Motorsport	(Austria) Franz Konrad (Switzerland) Toni Seiler (France) Jean-Marc Gounon	Ford 7.0L V8	D	109
8	GT	11	(Sweden) Roos Optima Racing Team	(Sweden) Henrik Roos (Sweden) Magnus Wallinder	Chrysler Viper GTS-R	D	109
8	GT	11	(Sweden) Roos Optima Racing Team	(Sweden) Henrik Roos (Sweden) Magnus Wallinder	Chrysler 8.0L V10	D	109
9	N-GT	99	(Germany) RWS Yukos Motorsport	(United Kingdom) Johnny Mowlem (France) Stéphane Daoudi	Porsche 911 GT3-R	P	108
9	N-GT	99	(Germany) RWS Yukos Motorsport	(United Kingdom) Johnny Mowlem (France) Stéphane Daoudi	Porsche 3.6L Flat-6	P	108
10	N-GT	51	(Germany) Freisinger Motorsport	(Belgium) Bert Longin (Switzerland) Gabriele Gardel	Porsche 911 GT3-RS	D	108
10	N-GT	51	(Germany) Freisinger Motorsport	(Belgium) Bert Longin (Switzerland) Gabriele Gardel	Porsche 3.6L Flat-6	D	108
11	N-GT	75	(United Kingdom) Team Eurotech	(United Kingdom) David Jones (United Kingdom) Godfrey Jones	Porsche 911 GT3-R	D	107
11	N-GT	75	(United Kingdom) Team Eurotech	(United Kingdom) David Jones (United Kingdom) Godfrey Jones	Porsche 3.6L Flat-6	D	107
12	GT	22	(Italy) BMS Scuderia Italia	(Italy) Fabrizio Gollin (Italy) Luca Cappellari	Ferrari 550-GTS Maranello	MI	107
12	GT	22	(Italy) BMS Scuderia Italia	(Italy) Fabrizio Gollin (Italy) Luca Cappellari	Ferrari 5.9L V12	MI	107
13	GT	15	(United Kingdom) Lister Storm Racing	(Italy) Andrea Piccini (Switzerland) Jean-Denis Délétraz	Lister Storm	D	106
13	GT	15	(United Kingdom) Lister Storm Racing	(Italy) Andrea Piccini (Switzerland) Jean-Denis Délétraz	Jaguar 7.0L V12	D	106
14	N-GT	88	(United Kingdom) Team Maranello Concessionaires	(United Kingdom) Tim Mullen (United Kingdom) Jamie Davies	Ferrari 360 Modena GT	D	106
14	N-GT	88	(United Kingdom) Team Maranello Concessionaires	(United Kingdom) Tim Mullen (United Kingdom) Jamie Davies	Ferrari 3.6L V8	D	106
15	N-GT	80	(United Kingdom) Veloqx Motorsport	(United Kingdom) Guy Smith (United Kingdom) Andrew Kirkaldy	Ferrari 360 Modena GT	D	106
15	N-GT	80	(United Kingdom) Veloqx Motorsport	(United Kingdom) Guy Smith (United Kingdom) Andrew Kirkaldy	Ferrari 3.6L V8	D	106
16	N-GT	77	(Germany) RWS Yukos Motorsport	(Russia) Nikolai Fomenko (Russia) Alexey Vasilyev	Porsche 911 GT3-RS	P	105
16	N-GT	77	(Germany) RWS Yukos Motorsport	(Russia) Nikolai Fomenko (Russia) Alexey Vasilyev	Porsche 3.6L Flat-6	P	105
17	N-GT	53	(France) JMB Racing	(France) Antoine Gosse (Netherlands) Peter Kutemann	Ferrari 360 Modena N-GT	P	103
17	N-GT	53	(France) JMB Racing	(France) Antoine Gosse (Netherlands) Peter Kutemann	Ferrari 3.6L V8	P	103
18	GT	9	(France) JMB Racing	(Austria) Philipp Peter (Italy) Fabio Babini	Ferrari 550 Maranello	P	101
18	GT	9	(France) JMB Racing	(Austria) Philipp Peter (Italy) Fabio Babini	Ferrari 6.0L V12	P	101
19	N-GT	61	(United Kingdom) EMKA Racing	(France) Emmanuel Collard (United Kingdom) Tim Sugden	Porsche 911 GT3-R	D	100
19	N-GT	61	(United Kingdom) EMKA Racing	(France) Emmanuel Collard (United Kingdom) Tim Sugden	Porsche 3.6L Flat-6	D	100
20	N-GT	69	(Germany) Proton Competition	(Germany) Christian Ried (Germany) Gerold Ried (Poland) Maciej Marcinkiewicz	Porsche 911 GT3-RS	D	86
20	N-GT	69	(Germany) Proton Competition	(Germany) Christian Ried (Germany) Gerold Ried (Poland) Maciej Marcinkiewicz	Porsche 3.6L Flat-6	D	86
21	GT	10	(France) JMB Racing	(France) Boris Derichebourg (France) David Terrien (Italy) Christian Pescatori	Ferrari 550 Maranello	P	82
21	GT	10	(France) JMB Racing	(France) Boris Derichebourg (France) David Terrien (Italy) Christian Pescatori	Ferrari 6.0L V12	P	82
22 NC	GT	16	(Germany) Wieth Racing	(Germany) Wolfgang Kaufmann (Italy) Vittorio Zoboli	Ferrari 550 Maranello	D	58
22 NC	GT	16	(Germany) Wieth Racing	(Germany) Wolfgang Kaufmann (Italy) Vittorio Zoboli	Ferrari 6.0L V12	D	58
23 DNF	N-GT	52	(France) JMB Racing	(Italy) Andrea Bertolini (Italy) Fabrizio de Simone	Ferrari 360 Modena GT	P	74
23 DNF	N-GT	52	(France) JMB Racing	(Italy) Andrea Bertolini (Italy) Fabrizio de Simone	Ferrari 3.6L V8	P	74
24 DNF	GT	14	(United Kingdom) Lister Storm Racing	(United Kingdom) Jamie Campbell-Walter (United Kingdom) Nathan Kinch (Netherlands) Tom Coronel	Lister Storm	D	50
24 DNF	GT	14	(United Kingdom) Lister Storm Racing	(United Kingdom) Jamie Campbell-Walter (United Kingdom) Nathan Kinch (Netherlands) Tom Coronel	Jaguar 7.0L V12	D	50
25 DNF	N-GT	74	(United Kingdom) Team Eurotech	(United Kingdom) Mike Jordan (United Kingdom) Mark Sumpter	Porsche 911 GT3-RS	D	42
25 DNF	N-GT	74	(United Kingdom) Team Eurotech	(United Kingdom) Mike Jordan (United Kingdom) Mark Sumpter	Porsche 3.6L Flat-6	D	42
26 DNF	N-GT	89	(United Kingdom) Team Maranello Concessionaires	(United Kingdom) Darren Turner (United Kingdom) Kelvin Burt	Ferrari 360 Modena N-GT	D	37
26 DNF	N-GT	89	(United Kingdom) Team Maranello Concessionaires	(United Kingdom) Darren Turner (United Kingdom) Kelvin Burt	Ferrari 3.6L V8	D	37
27 DNF	GT	5	(Switzerland) Force One Racing Festina (Netherlands) Carsport Holland	(Netherlands) Mike Hezemans (Belgium) Anthony Kumpen	Chrysler Viper GTS-R	P	26
27 DNF	GT	5	(Switzerland) Force One Racing Festina (Netherlands) Carsport Holland	(Netherlands) Mike Hezemans (Belgium) Anthony Kumpen	Chrysler 8.0L V10	P	26
DSQ^{†}	GT	18	(Netherlands) Zwaan's Racing	(Netherlands) Arjan van der Zwaan (Netherlands) Rob van der Zwaan (Germany) Klaus Abbelen	Chrysler Viper GTS-R	D	111
DSQ^{†}	GT	18	(Netherlands) Zwaan's Racing	(Netherlands) Arjan van der Zwaan (Netherlands) Rob van der Zwaan (Germany) Klaus Abbelen	Chrysler 8.0L V10	D	111
DNS	GT	8	(United Kingdom) Graham Nash Motorsport	(Portugal) Miguel Ramos (Portugal) Ni Amorim (Portugal) Pedro Chaves	Saleen S7-R	D	–
DNS	GT	8	(United Kingdom) Graham Nash Motorsport	(Portugal) Miguel Ramos (Portugal) Ni Amorim (Portugal) Pedro Chaves	Ford 7.0L V8	D	–

† – #18 Zwaan's Racing was disqualified for failing post-race technical inspection. The car was found to have an illegal fuel cooling device in use.

== Statistics ==
- Pole position – #4 Force One Racing Festina – 1:29.361
- Fastest lap – #2 Konrad Motorsport – 1:30.802
- Average speed – 149.950 km/h

FIA GT Championship
Previous race: 2003 FIA GT Brno 500km	2003 season	Next race: 2003 Spa 24 Hours
