= 2003 FIA GT Oschersleben 500km =

Layout of the Motorsport Arena Oschersleben

The 2003 FIA GT Oschersleben 500 km was the eighth round the 2003 FIA GT Championship. It took place at the Motorsport Arena Oschersleben, Germany, on 21 September 2003.

== Official results ==
Class winners in bold. Cars failing to complete 70% of winner's distance marked as Not Classified (NC).

Pos	Class	No	Team	Drivers	Chassis	Tyre	Laps
Pos	Class	No	Team	Drivers	Engine	Tyre	Laps
1	**GT**	**23**	**(Italy) BMS Scuderia Italia**	**(Italy) Matteo Bobbi (Italy) Thomas Biagi**	**Ferrari 550-GTS Maranello**	MI	**119**
1	**GT**	**23**	**(Italy) BMS Scuderia Italia**	**(Italy) Matteo Bobbi (Italy) Thomas Biagi**	**Ferrari 5.9L V12**	MI	**119**
2	GT	6	(United Kingdom) Creation Autosportif	(United Kingdom) Bobby Verdon-Roe (Italy) Marco Zadra	Lister Storm	D	118
2	GT	6	(United Kingdom) Creation Autosportif	(United Kingdom) Bobby Verdon-Roe (Italy) Marco Zadra	Jaguar 7.0L V12	D	118
3	GT	21	(United Kingdom) Care Racing (Italy) BMS Scuderia Italia	(Italy) Stefano Livio (Switzerland) Lilian Bryner (Switzerland) Enzo Calderari	Ferrari 550-GTS Maranello	MI	118
3	GT	21	(United Kingdom) Care Racing (Italy) BMS Scuderia Italia	(Italy) Stefano Livio (Switzerland) Lilian Bryner (Switzerland) Enzo Calderari	Ferrari 5.9L V12	MI	118
4	GT	7	(United Kingdom) Graham Nash Motorsport	(United Kingdom) Mike Newton (Brazil) Thomas Erdos	Saleen S7-R	D	117
4	GT	7	(United Kingdom) Graham Nash Motorsport	(United Kingdom) Mike Newton (Brazil) Thomas Erdos	Ford 7.0L V8	D	117
5	**N-GT**	**52**	**(France) JMB Racing**	**(Italy) Andrea Bertolini (Italy) Fabrizio de Simone**	**Ferrari 360 Modena GT**	P	**117**
5	**N-GT**	**52**	**(France) JMB Racing**	**(Italy) Andrea Bertolini (Italy) Fabrizio de Simone**	**Ferrari 3.6L V8**	P	**117**
6	N-GT	88	(United Kingdom) Team Maranello Concessionaires	(United Kingdom) Darren Turner (United Kingdom) Jamie Davies	Ferrari 360 Modena N-GT	D	117
6	N-GT	88	(United Kingdom) Team Maranello Concessionaires	(United Kingdom) Darren Turner (United Kingdom) Jamie Davies	Ferrari 3.6L V8	D	117
7	N-GT	89	(United Kingdom) Team Maranello Concessionaires	(United Kingdom) Kelvin Burt (United Kingdom) Tim Mullen	Ferrari 360 Modena GT	D	117
7	N-GT	89	(United Kingdom) Team Maranello Concessionaires	(United Kingdom) Kelvin Burt (United Kingdom) Tim Mullen	Ferrari 3.6L V8	D	117
8	N-GT	61	(United Kingdom) EMKA Racing	(France) Emmanuel Collard (United Kingdom) Tim Sugden	Porsche 911 GT3-R	D	116
8	N-GT	61	(United Kingdom) EMKA Racing	(France) Emmanuel Collard (United Kingdom) Tim Sugden	Porsche 3.6L Flat-6	D	116
9	GT	18	(Netherlands) Zwaan's Racing	(Netherlands) Arjan van der Zwaan (Netherlands) Rob van der Zwaan (Germany) Klaus Abbelen	Chrysler Viper GTS-R	D	116
9	GT	18	(Netherlands) Zwaan's Racing	(Netherlands) Arjan van der Zwaan (Netherlands) Rob van der Zwaan (Germany) Klaus Abbelen	Chrysler 8.0L V10	D	116
10	N-GT	50	(Germany) Freisinger Motorsport	(Germany) Marc Lieb (France) Stéphane Ortelli	Porsche 911 GT3-RS	D	116
10	N-GT	50	(Germany) Freisinger Motorsport	(Germany) Marc Lieb (France) Stéphane Ortelli	Porsche 3.6L Flat-6	D	116
11	GT	8	(United Kingdom) Graham Nash Motorsport	(Portugal) Ni Amorim (Portugal) Miguel Ramos (Portugal) Pedro Chaves	Saleen S7-R	D	115
11	GT	8	(United Kingdom) Graham Nash Motorsport	(Portugal) Ni Amorim (Portugal) Miguel Ramos (Portugal) Pedro Chaves	Ford 7.0L V8	D	115
12	GT	16	(Germany) Wieth Racing	(Germany) Wolfgang Kaufmann (Germany) Elmar Grimm (Italy) Paolo Biglieri	Ferrari 550 Maranello	D	115
12	GT	16	(Germany) Wieth Racing	(Germany) Wolfgang Kaufmann (Germany) Elmar Grimm (Italy) Paolo Biglieri	Ferrari 6.0L V12	D	115
13	N-GT	74	(United Kingdom) Team Eurotech	(United Kingdom) Mike Jordan (United Kingdom) Mark Sumpter	Porsche 911 GT3-RS	D	114
13	N-GT	74	(United Kingdom) Team Eurotech	(United Kingdom) Mike Jordan (United Kingdom) Mark Sumpter	Porsche 3.6L Flat-6	D	114
14	N-GT	99	(Germany) RWS Yukos Motorsport	(Austria) Toto Wolff (France) Stéphane Daoudi	Porsche 911 GT3-RS	P	114
14	N-GT	99	(Germany) RWS Yukos Motorsport	(Austria) Toto Wolff (France) Stéphane Daoudi	Porsche 3.6L Flat-6	P	114
15	N-GT	51	(Germany) Freisinger Motorsport	(Belgium) Bert Longin (Switzerland) Gabriele Gardel	Porsche 911 GT3-RS	D	114
15	N-GT	51	(Germany) Freisinger Motorsport	(Belgium) Bert Longin (Switzerland) Gabriele Gardel	Porsche 3.6L Flat-6	D	114
16	GT	10	(France) JMB Racing	(France) Boris Derichebourg (Italy) Christian Pescatori	Ferrari 550 Maranello	P	113
16	GT	10	(France) JMB Racing	(France) Boris Derichebourg (Italy) Christian Pescatori	Ferrari 6.0L V12	P	113
17	N-GT	77	(Germany) RWS Yukos Motorsport	(Russia) Nikolai Fomenko (Russia) Alexey Vasilyev	Porsche 911 GT3-RS	P	113
17	N-GT	77	(Germany) RWS Yukos Motorsport	(Russia) Nikolai Fomenko (Russia) Alexey Vasilyev	Porsche 3.6L Flat-6	P	113
18	N-GT	57	(Czech Republic) MenX	(Czech Republic) Tomáš Enge (Czech Republic) Robert Pergl	Ferrari 360 Modena GT	D	112
18	N-GT	57	(Czech Republic) MenX	(Czech Republic) Tomáš Enge (Czech Republic) Robert Pergl	Ferrari 3.6L V8	D	112
19	N-GT	75	(United Kingdom) Team Eurotech	(United Kingdom) Godfrey Jones (United Kingdom) David Jones	Porsche 911 GT3-RS	D	111
19	N-GT	75	(United Kingdom) Team Eurotech	(United Kingdom) Godfrey Jones (United Kingdom) David Jones	Porsche 3.6L Flat-6	D	111
20	N-GT	86	(Germany) JVG Racing	(Germany) Jürgen van Gartzen (Austria) Horst Felbermayr, Sr. (Austria) Horst Felbermayr, Jr.	Porsche 911 GT3-RS	P	110
20	N-GT	86	(Germany) JVG Racing	(Germany) Jürgen van Gartzen (Austria) Horst Felbermayr, Sr. (Austria) Horst Felbermayr, Jr.	Porsche 3.6L Flat-6	P	110
21	N-GT	69	(Germany) Proton Competition	(Germany) Christian Ried (Germany) Gerold Ried	Porsche 911 GT3-RS	D	107
21	N-GT	69	(Germany) Proton Competition	(Germany) Christian Ried (Germany) Gerold Ried	Porsche 3.6L Flat-6	D	107
22	GT	11	(Sweden) Roos Optima Racing Team	(Sweden) Henrik Roos (Sweden) Magnus Wallinder	Chrysler Viper GTS-R	D	104
22	GT	11	(Sweden) Roos Optima Racing Team	(Sweden) Henrik Roos (Sweden) Magnus Wallinder	Chrysler 8.0L V10	D	104
23	GT	4	(Switzerland) Force One Racing Festina	(France) Philippe Alliot (France) David Hallyday	Chrysler Viper GTS-R	P	101
23	GT	4	(Switzerland) Force One Racing Festina	(France) Philippe Alliot (France) David Hallyday	Chrysler 8.0L V10	P	101
24 DNF	GT	22	(Italy) BMS Scuderia Italia	(Italy) Fabrizio Gollin (Italy) Luca Cappellari	Ferrari 550-GTS Maranello	MI	74
24 DNF	GT	22	(Italy) BMS Scuderia Italia	(Italy) Fabrizio Gollin (Italy) Luca Cappellari	Ferrari 5.9L V12	MI	74
25 DNF	GT	5	(Switzerland) Force One Racing Festina (Netherlands) Carsport Holland	(Netherlands) Mike Hezemans (Belgium) Anthony Kumpen	Chrysler Viper GTS-R	P	71
25 DNF	GT	5	(Switzerland) Force One Racing Festina (Netherlands) Carsport Holland	(Netherlands) Mike Hezemans (Belgium) Anthony Kumpen	Chrysler 8.0L V10	P	71
26 DNF	GT	15	(United Kingdom) Lister Storm Racing	(Italy) Andrea Piccini (Belgium) David Sterckx	Lister Storm	D	66
26 DNF	GT	15	(United Kingdom) Lister Storm Racing	(Italy) Andrea Piccini (Belgium) David Sterckx	Jaguar 7.0L V12	D	66
27 DNF	GT	19	(United Kingdom) Creation Autosportif	(United Kingdom) Paul Knapfield (France) Jean-Marc Gounon	Lister Storm	D	47
27 DNF	GT	19	(United Kingdom) Creation Autosportif	(United Kingdom) Paul Knapfield (France) Jean-Marc Gounon	Jaguar 7.0L V12	D	47
28 DNF	N-GT	53	(France) JMB Racing	(Netherlands) Peter Kutemann (France) Antoine Gosse	Ferrari 360 Modena N-GT	P	43
28 DNF	N-GT	53	(France) JMB Racing	(Netherlands) Peter Kutemann (France) Antoine Gosse	Ferrari 3.6L V8	P	43
DSQ^{†}	GT	14	(United Kingdom) Lister Storm Racing	(United Kingdom) Jamie Campbell-Walter (United Kingdom) Nathan Kinch	Lister Storm	D	119
DSQ^{†}	GT	14	(United Kingdom) Lister Storm Racing	(United Kingdom) Jamie Campbell-Walter (United Kingdom) Nathan Kinch	Jaguar 7.0L V12	D	119
DSQ^{‡}	GT	2	(Germany) Konrad Motorsport	(Austria) Franz Konrad (Austria) Walter Lechner, Jr. (Switzerland) Toni Seiler	Saleen S7-R	D	117
DSQ^{‡}	GT	2	(Germany) Konrad Motorsport	(Austria) Franz Konrad (Austria) Walter Lechner, Jr. (Switzerland) Toni Seiler	Ford 7.0L V8	D	117
DNS	GT	9	(France) JMB Racing	(Austria) Philipp Peter (Italy) Fabio Babini	Ferrari 550 Maranello	P	–
DNS	GT	9	(France) JMB Racing	(Austria) Philipp Peter (Italy) Fabio Babini	Ferrari 6.0L V12	P	–
DNS	N-GT	85	(Germany) JVG Racing	(United Kingdom) Ian Khan (United Kingdom) Mark Mayall	Porsche 911 GT3-R	P	–
DNS	N-GT	85	(Germany) JVG Racing	(United Kingdom) Ian Khan (United Kingdom) Mark Mayall	Porsche 3.6L Flat-6	P	–

† – #14 Lister Racing was disqualified following the race. Officials deemed the car made avoidable contact with the #4 Force One Racing Festina entry during the race.

‡ – #2 Konrad Motorsport was disqualified following the race. Officials deemed the car had made dangerous maneuvers while behind the safety car.

== Statistics ==
- Pole position – #2 Konrad Motorsport – 1:23.869
- Fastest lap – #7 Graham Nash Motorsport – 1:26.361
- Average speed – 144.110 km/h

FIA GT Championship
Previous race: 2003 FIA GT Anderstorp 500km	2003 season	Next race: 2003 FIA GT Estoril 500km
