= 2003 FIA GT Championship =

Motorsports championship

Seasons
- ← 2002 2004 →

The 2003 FIA GT Championship was the seventh FIA GT Championship. It comprised the FIA GT Championship for Drivers, the N-GT Cup for Drivers, the FIA GT Championship for Teams and the N-GT Cup for Teams. The four titles were contested over a ten event series open to Grand Touring cars broken into two classes, GT and N-GT, based on power and manufacturer involvement. The championship began on 6 April 2003 and ended on 19 October 2003.

== Schedule ==
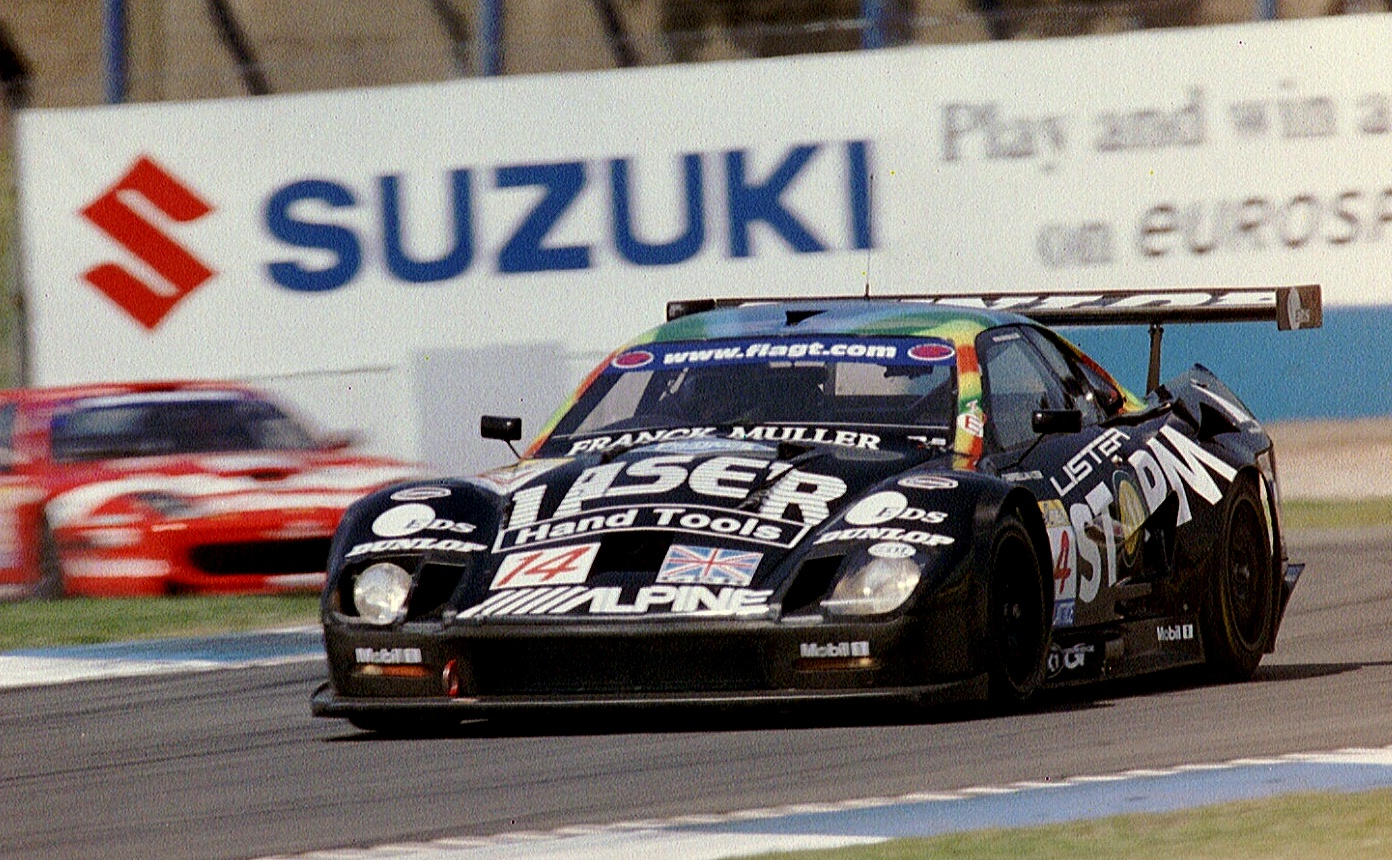
Lister Racing placed second in the FIA GT Championship for Teams.

Rnd	Race	Circuit	Date
1	(Spain) LG Super Racing Weekend Barcelona	Circuit de Catalunya	6 April
2	(France) LG Super Racing Weekend Magny-Cours	Circuit de Nevers Magny-Cours	27 April
3	(Italy) LG Super Racing Weekend Pergusa	Autodromo di Pergusa	11 May
4	(Czech Republic) LG Super Racing Weekend Brno	Autodrom Brno Masaryk	25 May
5	(United Kingdom) LG Super Racing Weekend Donington	Donington Park	29 June
6	(Belgium) Proximus Spa 24 Hours	Circuit de Spa-Francorchamps	26 July; 27 July
7	(Sweden) LG Super Racing Weekend Anderstorp	Scandinavian Raceway	7 September
8	(Germany) LG Super Racing Weekend Oschersleben	Motopark Oschersleben	21 September
9	(Portugal) LG Super Racing Weekend Estoril	Autódromo do Estoril	5 October
10	(Italy) LG Super Racing Weekend Monza	Autodromo Nazionale Monza	19 October

== Entries ==
=== GT ===
Entrant	Car	Engine	Tyre	No.	Drivers	Rounds
(France) Larbre Compétition	Chrysler Viper GTS-R	Chrysler 356-T6 8.0 L V10	M	1	(France) Christophe Bouchut	1–2, 6
(France) Larbre Compétition	Chrysler Viper GTS-R	Chrysler 356-T6 8.0 L V10	M	1	(France) Jean-Philippe Belloc	1–2
(France) Larbre Compétition	Chrysler Viper GTS-R	Chrysler 356-T6 8.0 L V10	M	1	(France) Sébastien Dumez	6
(France) Larbre Compétition	Chrysler Viper GTS-R	Chrysler 356-T6 8.0 L V10	M	1	(Belgium) Vincent Vosse	6
(France) Larbre Compétition	Chrysler Viper GTS-R	Chrysler 356-T6 8.0 L V10	M	1	(Netherlands) Patrick Huisman	6
(France) Larbre Compétition	Chrysler Viper GTS-R	Chrysler 356-T6 8.0 L V10	M	17	(France) Jean-Luc Blanchemain	6
(France) Larbre Compétition	Chrysler Viper GTS-R	Chrysler 356-T6 8.0 L V10	M	17	(Belgium) Vanina Ickx	6
(France) Larbre Compétition	Chrysler Viper GTS-R	Chrysler 356-T6 8.0 L V10	M	17	(Italy) Stefano Zonca	6
(France) Larbre Compétition	Chrysler Viper GTS-R	Chrysler 356-T6 8.0 L V10	M	17	(Finland) Pertti Kuismanen	6
(Germany) Konrad Motorsport	Saleen S7-R	Ford 6.9 L V8	D	2	(Austria) Franz Konrad	All
(Germany) Konrad Motorsport	Saleen S7-R	Ford 6.9 L V8	D	2	(Switzerland) Toni Seiler	All
(Germany) Konrad Motorsport	Saleen S7-R	Ford 6.9 L V8	D	2	(France) Jean-Marc Gounon	2–5
(Germany) Konrad Motorsport	Saleen S7-R	Ford 6.9 L V8	D	2	(Austria) Walter Lechner Jr.	6–10
(Germany) Konrad Motorsport	Saleen S7-R	Ford 6.9 L V8	D	2	(Belgium) Eric van de Poele	6
(France) Force One Racing Festina	Chrysler Viper GTS-R	Chrysler 356-T6 8.0 L V10	P	4	(France) Philippe Alliot	1–8
(France) Force One Racing Festina	Chrysler Viper GTS-R	Chrysler 356-T6 8.0 L V10	P	4	(Switzerland) Steve Zacchia	1–5, 7
(France) Force One Racing Festina	Chrysler Viper GTS-R	Chrysler 356-T6 8.0 L V10	P	4	(France) David Hallyday	1–2, 4–5, 8
(France) Force One Racing Festina	Chrysler Viper GTS-R	Chrysler 356-T6 8.0 L V10	P	4	(Netherlands) Mike Hezemans	6
(France) Force One Racing Festina	Chrysler Viper GTS-R	Chrysler 356-T6 8.0 L V10	P	4	(Netherlands) David Hart	6
(France) Force One Racing Festina	Chrysler Viper GTS-R	Chrysler 356-T6 8.0 L V10	P	4	(Belgium) Anthony Kumpen	6
(France) Force One Racing Festina	Chrysler Viper GTS-R	Chrysler 356-T6 8.0 L V10	P	5	(Netherlands) Mike Hezemans	1–5, 7–10
(France) Force One Racing Festina	Chrysler Viper GTS-R	Chrysler 356-T6 8.0 L V10	P	5	(Belgium) Anthony Kumpen	1–5, 7–10
(France) Force One Racing Festina	Chrysler Viper GTS-R	Chrysler 356-T6 8.0 L V10	P	5	(Switzerland) Steve Zacchia	6
(France) Force One Racing Festina	Chrysler Viper GTS-R	Chrysler 356-T6 8.0 L V10	P	5	(France) David Hallyday	6
(France) Force One Racing Festina	Chrysler Viper GTS-R	Chrysler 356-T6 8.0 L V10	P	5	(France) François Jakubowski	6
(France) Force One Racing Festina	Chrysler Viper GTS-R	Chrysler 356-T6 8.0 L V10	P	5	(France) Julien Gilbert	6
(France) Force One Racing Festina	Chrysler Viper GTS-R	Chrysler 356-T6 8.0 L V10	P	5	(France) Philippe Alliot	9–10
(United Kingdom) Creation Autosportif	Lister Storm GTM	Jaguar 7.0 L V12	D	6	(United Kingdom) Bobby Verdon-Roe	All
(United Kingdom) Creation Autosportif	Lister Storm GTM	Jaguar 7.0 L V12	D	6	(United Kingdom) Peter Snowdon	1
(United Kingdom) Creation Autosportif	Lister Storm GTM	Jaguar 7.0 L V12	D	6	(Italy) Marco Zadra	2–10
(United Kingdom) Creation Autosportif	Lister Storm GTM	Jaguar 7.0 L V12	D	6	(Netherlands) Duncan Huisman	6
(United Kingdom) Creation Autosportif	Lister Storm GTM	Jaguar 7.0 L V12	D	6	(France) Jean-Marc Gounon	6
(United Kingdom) Creation Autosportif	Lister Storm GTM	Jaguar 7.0 L V12	D	19	(United Kingdom) Paul Knapfield	7–10
(United Kingdom) Creation Autosportif	Lister Storm GTM	Jaguar 7.0 L V12	D	19	(France) Jean-Marc Gounon	7–10
(United Kingdom) Graham Nash Motorsport	Saleen S7-R	Ford 6.9 L V8	D	7	(United Kingdom) Mike Newton	All
(United Kingdom) Graham Nash Motorsport	Saleen S7-R	Ford 6.9 L V8	D	7	(Brazil) Thomas Erdos	All
(United Kingdom) Graham Nash Motorsport	Saleen S7-R	Ford 6.9 L V8	D	7	(Portugal) Miguel Ramos	6
(United Kingdom) Graham Nash Motorsport	Saleen S7-R	Ford 6.9 L V8	D	7	(Portugal) Pedro Chaves	6
(United Kingdom) Graham Nash Motorsport	Saleen S7-R	Ford 6.9 L V8	D	8	(Portugal) Miguel Ramos	1–5, 7–10
(United Kingdom) Graham Nash Motorsport	Saleen S7-R	Ford 6.9 L V8	D	8	(Portugal) Ni Amorim	1–5, 7–10
(United Kingdom) Graham Nash Motorsport	Saleen S7-R	Ford 6.9 L V8	D	8	(Portugal) Pedro Chaves	1–5, 7–8
(United Kingdom) Graham Nash Motorsport	Saleen S7-R	Ford 6.9 L V8	D	8	(Portugal) António Coimbra	9–10
(France) JMB Racing	Ferrari 550 Millennio; Ferrari 550 GT; Ferrari 575 GTC	Ferrari F133 GT 6.0 L V12	P	9	(Austria) Philipp Peter	All
(France) JMB Racing	Ferrari 550 Millennio; Ferrari 550 GT; Ferrari 575 GTC	Ferrari F133 GT 6.0 L V12	P	9	(Italy) Fabio Babini	All
(France) JMB Racing	Ferrari 550 Millennio; Ferrari 550 GT; Ferrari 575 GTC	Ferrari F133 GT 6.0 L V12	P	9	(France) Boris Derichebourg	6
(France) JMB Racing	Ferrari 550 Millennio; Ferrari 550 GT; Ferrari 575 GTC	Ferrari F133 GT 6.0 L V12	P	10	(France) Boris Derichebourg	1–5, 7–10
(France) JMB Racing	Ferrari 550 Millennio; Ferrari 550 GT; Ferrari 575 GTC	Ferrari F133 GT 6.0 L V12	P	10	(Italy) Christian Pescatori	1–5, 7–10
(France) JMB Racing	Ferrari 550 Millennio; Ferrari 550 GT; Ferrari 575 GTC	Ferrari F133 GT 6.0 L V12	P	10	(France) David Terrien	1–5
(Sweden) Roos Optima Racing Team	Chrysler Viper GTS-R	Chrysler 356-T6 8.0 L V10	D	11	(Sweden) Henrik Roos	All
(Sweden) Roos Optima Racing Team	Chrysler Viper GTS-R	Chrysler 356-T6 8.0 L V10	D	11	(Sweden) Magnus Wallinder	All
(Sweden) Roos Optima Racing Team	Chrysler Viper GTS-R	Chrysler 356-T6 8.0 L V10	D	11	(Belgium) Vincent Dupont	6
(Sweden) Roos Optima Racing Team	Chrysler Viper GTS-R	Chrysler 356-T6 8.0 L V10	D	11	(United Kingdom) Peter Snowdon	6
(Germany) Proton Competition	Porsche 911 GT2	Porsche 3.6 L Turbo Flat-6	Y	12	(Germany) Gerold Ried	1–3
(Germany) Proton Competition	Porsche 911 GT2	Porsche 3.6 L Turbo Flat-6	Y	12	(Germany) Christian Ried	1–3
(Germany) Proton Competition	Porsche 911 GT2	Porsche 3.6 L Turbo Flat-6	Y	12	(Italy) Mauro Casadei	4
(Germany) Proton Competition	Porsche 911 GT2	Porsche 3.6 L Turbo Flat-6	Y	12	(Italy) Moreno Soli	4
(Germany) Proton Competition	Porsche 911 GT2	Porsche 3.6 L Turbo Flat-6	Y	12	(Poland) Maciej Marcinkiewicz	4
(United Kingdom) Lister Racing	Lister Storm GTM	Jaguar 7.0 L V12	D	14	(United Kingdom) Jamie Campbell-Walter	All
(United Kingdom) Lister Racing	Lister Storm GTM	Jaguar 7.0 L V12	D	14	(United Kingdom) Nathan Kinch	All
(United Kingdom) Lister Racing	Lister Storm GTM	Jaguar 7.0 L V12	D	14	(Netherlands) Tom Coronel	5–6
(United Kingdom) Lister Racing	Lister Storm GTM	Jaguar 7.0 L V12	D	14	(United Kingdom) Robert Schirle	6
(United Kingdom) Lister Racing	Lister Storm GTM	Jaguar 7.0 L V12	D	15	(Italy) Andrea Piccini	All
(United Kingdom) Lister Racing	Lister Storm GTM	Jaguar 7.0 L V12	D	15	(Switzerland) Jean-Denis Délétraz	1–5
(United Kingdom) Lister Racing	Lister Storm GTM	Jaguar 7.0 L V12	D	15	(Belgium) David Sterckx	6–10
(United Kingdom) Lister Racing	Lister Storm GTM	Jaguar 7.0 L V12	D	15	(Italy) Gabriele Lancieri	6, 10
(United Kingdom) Lister Racing	Lister Storm GTM	Jaguar 7.0 L V12	D	15	(United Kingdom) Gavin Pickering	6
(Germany) Wieth Racing	Ferrari 550 GTS	Ferrari F133 6.0 L V12	D	16	(Germany) Wolfgang Kaufmann	All
(Germany) Wieth Racing	Ferrari 550 GTS	Ferrari F133 6.0 L V12	D	16	(Germany) Niko Wieth	1–4, 6, 9
(Germany) Wieth Racing	Ferrari 550 GTS	Ferrari F133 6.0 L V12	D	16	(Italy) Vittorio Zoboli	1–3, 5, 10
(Germany) Wieth Racing	Ferrari 550 GTS	Ferrari F133 6.0 L V12	D	16	(Germany) Elmar Grimm	6, 8
(Germany) Wieth Racing	Ferrari 550 GTS	Ferrari F133 6.0 L V12	D	16	(France) Thierry Stépec	6
(Germany) Wieth Racing	Ferrari 550 GTS	Ferrari F133 6.0 L V12	D	16	(Sweden) Tony Ring	7
(Germany) Wieth Racing	Ferrari 550 GTS	Ferrari F133 6.0 L V12	D	16	(Italy) Paolo Biglieri	8
(Germany) Wieth Racing	Ferrari 550 GTS	Ferrari F133 6.0 L V12	D	16	(Italy) Massimo Carli	10
(Netherlands) Zwaan's Racing	Chrysler Viper GTS-R	Chrysler 356-T6 8.0 L V10	D	18	(Netherlands) Arjan van der Zwaan	All
(Netherlands) Zwaan's Racing	Chrysler Viper GTS-R	Chrysler 356-T6 8.0 L V10	D	18	(Netherlands) Rob van der Zwaan	All
(Netherlands) Zwaan's Racing	Chrysler Viper GTS-R	Chrysler 356-T6 8.0 L V10	D	18	(Germany) Klaus Abbelen	All
(Netherlands) Zwaan's Racing	Chrysler Viper GTS-R	Chrysler 356-T6 8.0 L V10	D	18	(Belgium) Marc Goossens	6
(United Kingdom) Care Racing	Ferrari 550-GTS Maranello	Ferrari F133 5.9 L V12	M	21	(Switzerland) Lilian Bryner	1–5, 7–10
(United Kingdom) Care Racing	Ferrari 550-GTS Maranello	Ferrari F133 5.9 L V12	M	21	(Switzerland) Enzo Calderari	1–5, 7–10
(United Kingdom) Care Racing	Ferrari 550-GTS Maranello	Ferrari F133 5.9 L V12	M	21	(Italy) Stefano Livio	1–5, 7–10
(United Kingdom) Care Racing	Ferrari 550-GTS Maranello	Ferrari F133 5.9 L V12	M	21	(France) Jean-Marc Gounon	6
(United Kingdom) Care Racing	Ferrari 550-GTS Maranello	Ferrari F133 5.9 L V12	M	21	(France) Jérôme Policand	6
(United Kingdom) Care Racing	Ferrari 550-GTS Maranello	Ferrari F133 5.9 L V12	M	21	(Italy) Nicola Cadei	6
(Italy) BMS Scuderia Italia	Ferrari 550-GTS Maranello	Ferrari F133 5.9 L V12	M	22	(Italy) Fabrizio Gollin	All
(Italy) BMS Scuderia Italia	Ferrari 550-GTS Maranello	Ferrari F133 5.9 L V12	M	22	(Italy) Luca Cappellari	All
(Italy) BMS Scuderia Italia	Ferrari 550-GTS Maranello	Ferrari F133 5.9 L V12	M	22	(Switzerland) Enzo Calderari	6
(Italy) BMS Scuderia Italia	Ferrari 550-GTS Maranello	Ferrari F133 5.9 L V12	M	22	(Switzerland) Lilian Bryner	6
(Italy) BMS Scuderia Italia	Ferrari 550-GTS Maranello	Ferrari F133 5.9 L V12	M	23	(Italy) Matteo Bobbi	All
(Italy) BMS Scuderia Italia	Ferrari 550-GTS Maranello	Ferrari F133 5.9 L V12	M	23	(Italy) Thomas Biagi	All
(Italy) BMS Scuderia Italia	Ferrari 550-GTS Maranello	Ferrari F133 5.9 L V12	M	23	(Italy) Stefano Livio	6
(Italy) BMS Scuderia Italia	Ferrari 550-GTS Maranello	Ferrari F133 5.9 L V12	M	23	(Italy) Ettore Bonaldi	6
(France) Paul Belmondo Racing	Chrysler Viper GTS-R	Chrysler 356-T6 8.0 L V10	P	24	(France) Paul Belmondo	6
(France) Paul Belmondo Racing	Chrysler Viper GTS-R	Chrysler 356-T6 8.0 L V10	P	24	(France) Yann Clairay	6
(France) Paul Belmondo Racing	Chrysler Viper GTS-R	Chrysler 356-T6 8.0 L V10	P	24	(France) Emmanuel Clérico	6
(France) Paul Belmondo Racing	Chrysler Viper GTS-R	Chrysler 356-T6 8.0 L V10	P	24	(Belgium) Pierre-Yves Corthals	6
(France) Paul Belmondo Racing	Chrysler Viper GTS-R	Chrysler 356-T6 8.0 L V10	P	25	(France) Claude-Yves Gosselin	6
(France) Paul Belmondo Racing	Chrysler Viper GTS-R	Chrysler 356-T6 8.0 L V10	P	25	(France) Olivier Dupard	6
(France) Paul Belmondo Racing	Chrysler Viper GTS-R	Chrysler 356-T6 8.0 L V10	P	25	(France) Marco Saviozzi	6
(France) Paul Belmondo Racing	Chrysler Viper GTS-R	Chrysler 356-T6 8.0 L V10	P	25	(France) Pierre Ragues	6
(Germany) Reiter Engineering	Lamborghini Murciélago R-GT	Lamborghini 6.0 L V12	M	36	(Denmark) Tom Kristensen	10
(Germany) Reiter Engineering	Lamborghini Murciélago R-GT	Lamborghini 6.0 L V12	M	36	(Italy) Rinaldo Capello	10
(Italy) Megadrive	Chrysler Viper GTS-R	Chrysler 356-T6 8.0 L V10	P	37	(Italy) Stefano Zonca	10
(Italy) Megadrive	Chrysler Viper GTS-R	Chrysler 356-T6 8.0 L V10	P	37	(Italy) Piergiuseppe Perazzini	10
(Italy) Megadrive	Chrysler Viper GTS-R	Chrysler 356-T6 8.0 L V10	P	37	(Italy) Gabriele Matteuzzi	10
(Poland) Alda Motorsport	Porsche 911 GT2	Porsche 3.8 L Turbo Flat-6	D	38	(Poland) Maciej Stanco	10
(Poland) Alda Motorsport	Porsche 911 GT2	Porsche 3.8 L Turbo Flat-6	D	38	(Italy) Mauro Casadei	10
(Poland) Alda Motorsport	Porsche 911 GT2	Porsche 3.8 L Turbo Flat-6	D	38	(Italy) Moreno Soli	10

=== N-GT ===
Entrant	Car	Engine	Tyre	No.	Drivers	Rounds
(Germany) Freisinger Motorsport	Porsche 911 GT3-RS	Porsche 3.6 L Flat-6	D	50	(Germany) Marc Lieb	All
(Germany) Freisinger Motorsport	Porsche 911 GT3-RS	Porsche 3.6 L Flat-6	D	50	(Germany) Sascha Maassen	1
(Germany) Freisinger Motorsport	Porsche 911 GT3-RS	Porsche 3.6 L Flat-6	D	50	(Monaco) Stéphane Ortelli	2–10
(Germany) Freisinger Motorsport	Porsche 911 GT3-RS	Porsche 3.6 L Flat-6	D	50	(France) Romain Dumas	6
(Germany) Freisinger Motorsport	Porsche 911 GT3-RS	Porsche 3.6 L Flat-6	D	51	(Switzerland) Gabriele Gardel	All
(Germany) Freisinger Motorsport	Porsche 911 GT3-RS	Porsche 3.6 L Flat-6	D	51	(Belgium) Bert Longin	All
(Germany) Freisinger Motorsport	Porsche 911 GT3-RS	Porsche 3.6 L Flat-6	D	51	(Belgium) Jeffrey van Hooydonk	6
(Germany) Freisinger Motorsport	Porsche 911 GT3-RS	Porsche 3.6 L Flat-6	D	51	(France) Guillaume Gomez	6
(France) JMB Racing	Ferrari 360 Modena N-GT; Ferrari 360 Modena GT	Ferrari 3.6 L V8	P	52	(Italy) Andrea Bertolini	All
(France) JMB Racing	Ferrari 360 Modena N-GT; Ferrari 360 Modena GT	Ferrari 3.6 L V8	P	52	(Italy) Fabrizio de Simone	1–5, 7–10
(France) JMB Racing	Ferrari 360 Modena N-GT; Ferrari 360 Modena GT	Ferrari 3.6 L V8	P	52	(Italy) Christian Pescatori	6
(France) JMB Racing	Ferrari 360 Modena N-GT; Ferrari 360 Modena GT	Ferrari 3.6 L V8	P	52	(France) David Terrien	6
(France) JMB Racing	Ferrari 360 Modena N-GT; Ferrari 360 Modena GT	Ferrari 3.6 L V8	P	53	(Netherlands) Peter Kutemann	1–5, 7–10
(France) JMB Racing	Ferrari 360 Modena N-GT; Ferrari 360 Modena GT	Ferrari 3.6 L V8	P	53	(France) Antoine Gosse	1–5, 7–10
(France) JMB Racing	Ferrari 360 Modena N-GT; Ferrari 360 Modena GT	Ferrari 3.6 L V8	P	53	(Switzerland) Iradj Alexander	6
(France) JMB Racing	Ferrari 360 Modena N-GT; Ferrari 360 Modena GT	Ferrari 3.6 L V8	P	53	(Italy) Fabrizio de Simone	6
(France) JMB Racing	Ferrari 360 Modena N-GT; Ferrari 360 Modena GT	Ferrari 3.6 L V8	P	53	(Brazil) Luciano Burti	6
(Netherlands) Peter Kutemann	Ferrari 360 Modena N-GT; Ferrari 360 Modena GT	Ferrari 3.6 L V8	P	68	(Netherlands) Peter Kutemann	6
(Netherlands) Peter Kutemann	Ferrari 360 Modena N-GT; Ferrari 360 Modena GT	Ferrari 3.6 L V8	P	68	(France) Antoine Gosse	6
(Netherlands) Peter Kutemann	Ferrari 360 Modena N-GT; Ferrari 360 Modena GT	Ferrari 3.6 L V8	P	68	(United States) Stephen Earle	6
(Netherlands) Peter Kutemann	Ferrari 360 Modena N-GT; Ferrari 360 Modena GT	Ferrari 3.6 L V8	P	68	(Italy) Batti Pregliasco	6
(United Kingdom) Cirtek Motorsport	Porsche 911 GT3-R	Porsche 3.6 L Flat-6	D	54	(United Kingdom) Mark Mayall	1, 4
(United Kingdom) Cirtek Motorsport	Porsche 911 GT3-R	Porsche 3.6 L Flat-6	D	54	(Italy) Marco Zadra	1
(United Kingdom) Cirtek Motorsport	Porsche 911 GT3-R	Porsche 3.6 L Flat-6	D	54	(France) Xavier Pompidou	2
(United Kingdom) Cirtek Motorsport	Porsche 911 GT3-R	Porsche 3.6 L Flat-6	D	54	(United Kingdom) Richard Kaye	2
(United Kingdom) Cirtek Motorsport	Porsche 911 GT3-R	Porsche 3.6 L Flat-6	D	54	(United Kingdom) Ian Khan	4
(United Kingdom) Cirtek Motorsport	Porsche 911 GT3-R	Porsche 3.6 L Flat-6	D	55	(United Kingdom) Ian Khan	1–2
(United Kingdom) Cirtek Motorsport	Porsche 911 GT3-R	Porsche 3.6 L Flat-6	D	55	(United Kingdom) Adam Jones	1–2
(Poland) Alda Motorsport	Porsche 911 GT3-RS	Porsche 3.6 L Flat-6	D	56	(Poland) Andrzej Dziurka	1–4
(Poland) Alda Motorsport	Porsche 911 GT3-RS	Porsche 3.6 L Flat-6	D	56	(Poland) Wojciech Dobrzanski	1–4
(Czech Republic) MenX	Ferrari 360 Modena GT	Ferrari 3.6 L V8	D	57	(Czech Republic) Robert Pergl	1–4, 6–10
(Czech Republic) MenX	Ferrari 360 Modena GT	Ferrari 3.6 L V8	D	57	(Czech Republic) Tomáš Enge	1–4, 8
(Czech Republic) MenX	Ferrari 360 Modena GT	Ferrari 3.6 L V8	D	57	(Czech Republic) Jaroslav Janiš	6–7, 9–10
(Czech Republic) MenX	Ferrari 360 Modena GT	Ferrari 3.6 L V8	D	57	(France) Yannick Schroeder	6
(France) Auto Palace	Ferrari 360 Modena GT	Ferrari 3.6 L V8	P	58	(France) Steeve Hiesse	1–4, 10
(France) Auto Palace	Ferrari 360 Modena GT	Ferrari 3.6 L V8	P	58	(France) Guillaume Gomez	1–4
(France) Auto Palace	Ferrari 360 Modena GT	Ferrari 3.6 L V8	P	58	(Italy) Gianluca Ermolli	10
(United Kingdom) EMKA Racing	Porsche 911 GT3-R	Porsche 3.6 L Flat-6	D	61	(United Kingdom) Tim Sugden	All
(United Kingdom) EMKA Racing	Porsche 911 GT3-R	Porsche 3.6 L Flat-6	D	61	(United Kingdom) Martin Short	1–4
(United Kingdom) EMKA Racing	Porsche 911 GT3-R	Porsche 3.6 L Flat-6	D	61	(France) Emmanuel Collard	5–10
(United Kingdom) EMKA Racing	Porsche 911 GT3-R	Porsche 3.6 L Flat-6	D	61	(United Kingdom) Chris Goodwin	6
(Spain) G-Tec	Porsche 911 GT3-R	Porsche 3.6 L Flat-6	D	62	(United Kingdom) Richard Kaye	1
(Spain) G-Tec	Porsche 911 GT3-R	Porsche 3.6 L Flat-6	D	62	(Russia) Rustem Teregulov	1
(Spain) Motor Competición	Porsche 911 GT3-RS	Porsche 3.6 L Flat-6	D	63	(Spain) Luis Villalba	1
(Spain) Motor Competición	Porsche 911 GT3-RS	Porsche 3.6 L Flat-6	D	63	(Spain) Francesc Gutiérrez	1
(Italy) AB Motorsport	Porsche 911 GT3-RS	Porsche 3.6 L Flat-6	P	64	(Italy) Renato Premoli	1–2, 10
(Italy) AB Motorsport	Porsche 911 GT3-RS	Porsche 3.6 L Flat-6	P	64	(Italy) Bruno Barbaro	1–2, 10
(Italy) AB Motorsport	Porsche 911 GT3-RS	Porsche 3.6 L Flat-6	P	64	(Italy) Antonio De Castro	1–2, 10
(France) Protonic Desbruères	Porsche 911 GT3-RS	Porsche 3.6 L Flat-6	P	65	(France) Christopher Campbell	2
(France) Protonic Desbruères	Porsche 911 GT3-RS	Porsche 3.6 L Flat-6	P	65	(France) Philippe Brocard	2
(France) Protonic Desbruères	Porsche 911 GT3-RS	Porsche 3.6 L Flat-6	P	65	(France) Daniel Desbruères	2
(Italy) Autorlando Sport	Porsche 911 GT3-RS	Porsche 3.6 L Flat-6	P	66	(Italy) Diego Alessi	6, 9
(Italy) Autorlando Sport	Porsche 911 GT3-RS	Porsche 3.6 L Flat-6	P	66	(Italy) Edy Gay	6, 9
(Italy) Autorlando Sport	Porsche 911 GT3-RS	Porsche 3.6 L Flat-6	P	66	(Italy) Maurizio Mediani	6, 9
(Italy) Autorlando Sport	Porsche 911 GT3-RS	Porsche 3.6 L Flat-6	P	66	(France) Michael Orts	6
(Italy) Autorlando Sport	Porsche 911 GT3-RS	Porsche 3.6 L Flat-6	P	67	(Italy) Bruno Corradi	6
(Italy) Autorlando Sport	Porsche 911 GT3-RS	Porsche 3.6 L Flat-6	P	67	(Italy) Moreno Soli	6
(Italy) Autorlando Sport	Porsche 911 GT3-RS	Porsche 3.6 L Flat-6	P	67	(Italy) Marco Facchetti	6
(Italy) Autorlando Sport	Porsche 911 GT3-RS	Porsche 3.6 L Flat-6	P	67	(Italy) Giampaolo Tenchini	6
(Italy) Autorlando Sport	Porsche 911 GT3-RS	Porsche 3.6 L Flat-6	P	67	(Italy) Marco Spinelli	10
(Italy) Autorlando Sport	Porsche 911 GT3-RS	Porsche 3.6 L Flat-6	P	67	(Italy) Gabriele Sabatini	10
(Germany) Proton Competition	Porsche 911 GT3-RS	Porsche 3.6 L Flat-6	D	69	(Germany) Christian Ried	4–10
(Germany) Proton Competition	Porsche 911 GT3-RS	Porsche 3.6 L Flat-6	D	69	(Germany) Gerold Ried	4–10
(Germany) Proton Competition	Porsche 911 GT3-RS	Porsche 3.6 L Flat-6	D	69	(Poland) Maciej Marcinkiewicz	5, 10
(Germany) Proton Competition	Porsche 911 GT3-RS	Porsche 3.6 L Flat-6	D	69	(Austria) Horst Felbermayr	6
(Germany) Proton Competition	Porsche 911 GT3-RS	Porsche 3.6 L Flat-6	D	69	(Austria) Horst Felbermayr Jr.	6
(Italy) Yellow Racing	Ferrari 360 Modena	Ferrari 3.6 L V8	P	70	(Italy) Fabio Venier	9–10
(Italy) Yellow Racing	Ferrari 360 Modena	Ferrari 3.6 L V8	P	70	(Portugal) Pedro Névoa	9
(Italy) Yellow Racing	Ferrari 360 Modena	Ferrari 3.6 L V8	P	70	(France) Jonathan Cochet	10
(Italy) Mastercar	Ferrari 360 Modena N-GT	Ferrari 3.6 L V8	Y	71	(Italy) Franco Bertoli	10
(Italy) Mastercar	Ferrari 360 Modena N-GT	Ferrari 3.6 L V8	Y	71	(Italy) Andrea Montermini	10
(Italy) Mastercar	Ferrari 360 Modena N-GT	Ferrari 3.6 L V8	Y	71	(Italy) "Base Up"	10
(Germany) Seikel Motorsport	Porsche 911 GT3-RS	Porsche 3.6 L Flat-6	Y	72	(Switzerland) Andrea Chiesa	6
(Germany) Seikel Motorsport	Porsche 911 GT3-RS	Porsche 3.6 L Flat-6	Y	72	(Italy) Alex Caffi	6
(Germany) Seikel Motorsport	Porsche 911 GT3-RS	Porsche 3.6 L Flat-6	Y	72	(Italy) Luca Drudi	6
(Germany) Seikel Motorsport	Porsche 911 GT3-RS	Porsche 3.6 L Flat-6	Y	72	(Italy) Gabrio Rosa	6
(Germany) Seikel Motorsport	Porsche 911 GT3-RS	Porsche 3.6 L Flat-6	Y	73	(Canada) Tony Burgess	6
(Germany) Seikel Motorsport	Porsche 911 GT3-RS	Porsche 3.6 L Flat-6	Y	73	(United States) John Lloyd	6
(Germany) Seikel Motorsport	Porsche 911 GT3-RS	Porsche 3.6 L Flat-6	Y	73	(United States) Philip Collin	6
(Germany) Seikel Motorsport	Porsche 911 GT3-RS	Porsche 3.6 L Flat-6	Y	73	(Germany) Tim Bergmeister	6
(United Kingdom) Team Eurotech	Porsche 911 GT3-R; Porsche 911 GT3-RS	Porsche 3.6 L Flat-6	D	74	(United Kingdom) Mike Jordan	1–5, 8–10
(United Kingdom) Team Eurotech	Porsche 911 GT3-R; Porsche 911 GT3-RS	Porsche 3.6 L Flat-6	D	74	(United Kingdom) Mark Sumpter	1–5, 8–9
(United Kingdom) Team Eurotech	Porsche 911 GT3-R; Porsche 911 GT3-RS	Porsche 3.6 L Flat-6	D	74	(United Kingdom) Mark Mayall	6–7
(United Kingdom) Team Eurotech	Porsche 911 GT3-R; Porsche 911 GT3-RS	Porsche 3.6 L Flat-6	D	74	(Germany) Jürgen von Gartzen	6–7
(United Kingdom) Team Eurotech	Porsche 911 GT3-R; Porsche 911 GT3-RS	Porsche 3.6 L Flat-6	D	74	(United Kingdom) Ian Khan	6
(United Kingdom) Team Eurotech	Porsche 911 GT3-R; Porsche 911 GT3-RS	Porsche 3.6 L Flat-6	D	74	(United Kingdom) Nigel Smith	6
(United Kingdom) Team Eurotech	Porsche 911 GT3-R; Porsche 911 GT3-RS	Porsche 3.6 L Flat-6	D	74	(United Kingdom) Rob Barff	10
(United Kingdom) Team Eurotech	Porsche 911 GT3-R; Porsche 911 GT3-RS	Porsche 3.6 L Flat-6	D	75	(United Kingdom) David Jones	1–6, 8–10
(United Kingdom) Team Eurotech	Porsche 911 GT3-R; Porsche 911 GT3-RS	Porsche 3.6 L Flat-6	D	75	(United Kingdom) Godfrey Jones	1–6, 8–10
(United Kingdom) Team Eurotech	Porsche 911 GT3-R; Porsche 911 GT3-RS	Porsche 3.6 L Flat-6	D	75	(United Kingdom) Mike Jordan	6
(United Kingdom) Team Eurotech	Porsche 911 GT3-R; Porsche 911 GT3-RS	Porsche 3.6 L Flat-6	D	75	(United Kingdom) Mark Sumpter	6
(Germany) RWS Yukos Motorsport	Porsche 911 GT3-R; Porsche 911 GT3-RS	Porsche 3.6 L Flat-6	P	77	(Russia) Aleksey Vasilyev	All
(Germany) RWS Yukos Motorsport	Porsche 911 GT3-R; Porsche 911 GT3-RS	Porsche 3.6 L Flat-6	P	77	(Russia) Nikolai Fomenko	All
(Germany) RWS Yukos Motorsport	Porsche 911 GT3-R; Porsche 911 GT3-RS	Porsche 3.6 L Flat-6	P	77	(United Kingdom) Adam Jones	6
(Germany) RWS Yukos Motorsport	Porsche 911 GT3-R; Porsche 911 GT3-RS	Porsche 3.6 L Flat-6	P	77	(France) Stéphane Daoudi	6
(Germany) RWS Yukos Motorsport	Porsche 911 GT3-R; Porsche 911 GT3-RS	Porsche 3.6 L Flat-6	P	99	(France) Stéphane Daoudi	1–5, 7–10
(Germany) RWS Yukos Motorsport	Porsche 911 GT3-R; Porsche 911 GT3-RS	Porsche 3.6 L Flat-6	P	99	(Austria) Walter Lechner Jr.	1–4
(Germany) RWS Yukos Motorsport	Porsche 911 GT3-R; Porsche 911 GT3-RS	Porsche 3.6 L Flat-6	P	99	(United Kingdom) Johnny Mowlem	5
(Germany) RWS Yukos Motorsport	Porsche 911 GT3-R; Porsche 911 GT3-RS	Porsche 3.6 L Flat-6	P	99	(United Kingdom) Adam Jones	7
(Germany) RWS Yukos Motorsport	Porsche 911 GT3-R; Porsche 911 GT3-RS	Porsche 3.6 L Flat-6	P	99	(Austria) Toto Wolff	8–10
(United Kingdom) Veloqx Racing	Ferrari 360 Modena N-GT; Ferrari 360 Modena GT	Ferrari 3.6 L V8	D	80	(United Kingdom) Andrew Kirkaldy	5
(United Kingdom) Veloqx Racing	Ferrari 360 Modena N-GT; Ferrari 360 Modena GT	Ferrari 3.6 L V8	D	80	(United Kingdom) Guy Smith	5
(United Kingdom) Team Maranello Concessionaires	Ferrari 360 Modena N-GT; Ferrari 360 Modena GT	Ferrari 3.6 L V8	D	88	(United Kingdom) Tim Mullen	1–6
(United Kingdom) Team Maranello Concessionaires	Ferrari 360 Modena N-GT; Ferrari 360 Modena GT	Ferrari 3.6 L V8	D	88	(United Kingdom) Jamie Davies	1–5, 7–10
(United Kingdom) Team Maranello Concessionaires	Ferrari 360 Modena N-GT; Ferrari 360 Modena GT	Ferrari 3.6 L V8	D	88	(United Kingdom) Andrew Kirkaldy	6
(United Kingdom) Team Maranello Concessionaires	Ferrari 360 Modena N-GT; Ferrari 360 Modena GT	Ferrari 3.6 L V8	D	88	(United Kingdom) Kelvin Burt	6
(United Kingdom) Team Maranello Concessionaires	Ferrari 360 Modena N-GT; Ferrari 360 Modena GT	Ferrari 3.6 L V8	D	88	(United Kingdom) Darren Turner	7–10
(United Kingdom) Team Maranello Concessionaires	Ferrari 360 Modena N-GT; Ferrari 360 Modena GT	Ferrari 3.6 L V8	D	89	(United Kingdom) Darren Turner	1–6
(United Kingdom) Team Maranello Concessionaires	Ferrari 360 Modena N-GT; Ferrari 360 Modena GT	Ferrari 3.6 L V8	D	89	(United Kingdom) Kelvin Burt	1–5, 7–10
(United Kingdom) Team Maranello Concessionaires	Ferrari 360 Modena N-GT; Ferrari 360 Modena GT	Ferrari 3.6 L V8	D	89	(United Kingdom) Guy Smith	6
(United Kingdom) Team Maranello Concessionaires	Ferrari 360 Modena N-GT; Ferrari 360 Modena GT	Ferrari 3.6 L V8	D	89	(United Kingdom) Jamie Davies	6
(United Kingdom) Team Maranello Concessionaires	Ferrari 360 Modena N-GT; Ferrari 360 Modena GT	Ferrari 3.6 L V8	D	89	(United Kingdom) Tim Mullen	7–10
(Germany) T2M – Kaneko	Porsche 911 GT3-R	Porsche 3.6 L Flat-6	D	84	(Germany) Frank Hahn	6
(Germany) T2M – Kaneko	Porsche 911 GT3-R	Porsche 3.6 L Flat-6	D	84	(United Kingdom) Paul Daniels	6
(Germany) T2M – Kaneko	Porsche 911 GT3-R	Porsche 3.6 L Flat-6	D	84	(Belgium) Christophe Geoffroy	6
(Germany) T2M – Kaneko	Porsche 911 GT3-R	Porsche 3.6 L Flat-6	D	84	(Belgium) Wim Coekelberghs	6
(Germany) JVG Racing	Porsche 911 GT3-R; Porsche 911 GT3-RS	Porsche 3.6 L Flat-6	P	85	(United Kingdom) Ian Khan	8–10
(Germany) JVG Racing	Porsche 911 GT3-R; Porsche 911 GT3-RS	Porsche 3.6 L Flat-6	P	85	(United Kingdom) Mark Mayall	8–10
(Germany) JVG Racing	Porsche 911 GT3-R; Porsche 911 GT3-RS	Porsche 3.6 L Flat-6	P	85	(Belgium) Michel Neugarten	10
(Germany) JVG Racing	Porsche 911 GT3-R; Porsche 911 GT3-RS	Porsche 3.6 L Flat-6	P	86	(Germany) Jürgen van Gartzen	8, 10
(Germany) JVG Racing	Porsche 911 GT3-R; Porsche 911 GT3-RS	Porsche 3.6 L Flat-6	P	86	(Austria) Horst Felbermayr	8, 10
(Germany) JVG Racing	Porsche 911 GT3-R; Porsche 911 GT3-RS	Porsche 3.6 L Flat-6	P	86	(Austria) Horst Felbermayr Jr.	8, 10
(Italy) MAC Racing	Porsche 911 GT3-R	Porsche 3.6 L Flat-6	P	90	(France) Olivier Dupard	10
(Italy) MAC Racing	Porsche 911 GT3-R	Porsche 3.6 L Flat-6	P	90	(France) Pierre Bes	10
(Italy) MAC Racing	Porsche 911 GT3-R	Porsche 3.6 L Flat-6	P	90	(France) Marco Saviozzi	10

== Season results ==
Overall winners in bold.

Rnd	Circuit	GT Winning Team	N-GT Winning Team	Results
Rnd	Circuit	GT Winning Drivers	N-GT Winning Drivers	Results
1	Catalunya	**(Italy) #23 BMS Scuderia Italia**	(France) #52 JMB Racing	Results
1	Catalunya	(Italy) **Thomas Biagi** (Italy) **Matteo Bobbi**	(Italy) Andrea Bertolini (Italy) Fabrizio De Simone	Results
2	Magny-Cours	**(Italy) #23 BMS Scuderia Italia**	(United Kingdom) #88 Team Maranello	Results
2	Magny-Cours	(Italy) **Thomas Biagi** (Italy) **Matteo Bobbi**	(United Kingdom) Tim Mullen (United Kingdom) Jamie Davies	Results
3	Pergusa	**(Italy) #23 BMS Scuderia Italia**	(United Kingdom) #61 EMKA Racing	Results
3	Pergusa	(Italy) **Thomas Biagi** (Italy) **Matteo Bobbi**	(United Kingdom) Tim Sugden (United Kingdom) Martin Short	Results
4	Brno	**(Italy) #23 BMS Scuderia Italia**	(Germany) #50 Freisinger Motorsport	Results
4	Brno	(Italy) **Thomas Biagi** (Italy) **Matteo Bobbi**	(Germany) Marc Lieb (France) Stéphane Ortelli	Results
5	Donington	**(Italy) #23 BMS Scuderia Italia**	(Germany) #50 Freisinger Motorsport	Results
5	Donington	(Italy) **Thomas Biagi** (Italy) **Matteo Bobbi**	(Germany) Marc Lieb (France) Stéphane Ortelli	Results
6	Spa	(Italy) #22 BMS Scuderia Italia	**(Germany) #50 Freisinger Motorsport**	Results
6	Spa	(Italy) Fabrizio Gollin (Italy) Luca Cappellari (Switzerland) Enzo Calderari (Switzerland) Lilian Bryner	(Germany) **Marc Lieb** (France) **Stéphane Ortelli** (France) **Romain Dumas**	Results
7	Anderstorp	**(United Kingdom) #14 Lister Racing**	(United Kingdom) #61 EMKA Racing	Results
7	Anderstorp	(United Kingdom) **Jamie Campbell-Walter** (United Kingdom) **Nathan Kinch**	(United Kingdom) Tim Sugden (France) Emmanuel Collard	Results
8	Oschersleben	**(Italy) #23 BMS Scuderia Italia**	(France) #52 JMB Racing	Results
8	Oschersleben	(Italy) **Thomas Biagi** (Italy) **Matteo Bobbi**	(Italy) Andrea Bertolini (Italy) Fabrizio De Simone	Results
9	Estoril	**(France) #9 JMB Racing**	(France) #52 JMB Racing	Results
9	Estoril	(Italy) **Fabio Babini** (Austria) **Philipp Peter**	(Italy) Andrea Bertolini (Italy) Fabrizio De Simone	Results
10	Monza	**(Italy) #22 BMS Scuderia Italia**	(France) #52 JMB Racing	Results
10	Monza	(Italy) **Fabrizio Gollin** (Italy) **Luca Cappellari**	(Italy) Andrea Bertolini (Italy) Fabrizio De Simone	Results

== Drivers' Championship ==
=== FIA GT Championship for Drivers ===
The 2003 FIA GT Championship for Drivers was won by Matteo Bobbi & Thomas Biagi driving a Ferrari 550 Maranello for BMS Scuderia Italia.

Pos.	Driver	Team	BAR (Spain)	MAG (France)	PER (Italy)	BRN (Czech Republic)	DON (United Kingdom)	SPA (Belgium)			AND (Sweden)	OSC (Germany)	EST (Portugal)	MON (Italy)	Total points
Pos.	Driver	Team	BAR (Spain)	MAG (France)	PER (Italy)	BRN (Czech Republic)	DON (United Kingdom)	6H	12H	24H	AND (Sweden)	OSC (Germany)	EST (Portugal)	MON (Italy)	Total points
1	(Italy) Matteo Bobbi	(Italy) BMS Scuderia Italia	1	1	1	1	1	Ret	Ret	Ret	Ret	1	3	6	69
1	(Italy) Thomas Biagi	(Italy) BMS Scuderia Italia	1	1	1	1	1	Ret	Ret	Ret	Ret	1	3	6	69
2	(Italy) Luca Cappellari	(Italy) BMS Scuderia Italia	2	2	DSQ	3	8	3	5	1	4	Ret	2	1	61
2	(Italy) Fabrizio Gollin	(Italy) BMS Scuderia Italia	2	2	DSQ	3	8	3	5	1	4	Ret	2	1	61
3	(Switzerland) Enzo Calderari	(United Kingdom) Care Racing	3	Ret	3	5	2				5	3	9	2	57
3	(Switzerland) Enzo Calderari	(Italy) BMS Scuderia Italia						3	5	1					57
3	(Switzerland) Lilian Bryner	(United Kingdom) Care Racing	3	Ret	3	5	2				5	3	9	2	57
3	(Switzerland) Lilian Bryner	(Italy) BMS Scuderia Italia						3	5	1					57
4	(Italy) Andrea Piccini	(United Kingdom) Lister Racing	4	3	5	2	9	8	4	4	3	Ret	Ret	7	39
5	(Italy) Stefano Livio	(United Kingdom) Care Racing	3	Ret	3	5	2				5	3	9	2	38
5	(Italy) Stefano Livio	(Italy) BMS Scuderia Italia						Ret	Ret	Ret					38
6	(United Kingdom) Jamie Campbell-Walter	(United Kingdom) Lister Racing	Ret	6	2	4	Ret	Ret	Ret	Ret	1	DSQ	Ret	3	32
6	(United Kingdom) Nathan Kinch	(United Kingdom) Lister Racing	Ret	6	2	4	Ret	Ret	Ret	Ret	1	DSQ	Ret	3	32
7	(United Kingdom) Bobby Verdon-Roe	(United Kingdom) Creation Autosportif	5	7	4	6	5	7	Ret	Ret	7	2	Ret	8	28
8	(Italy) Fabio Babini	(France) JMB Racing	Ret	Ret	Ret	Ret	10	1	2	Ret	8	DNS	1	4	25
8	(Austria) Philipp Peter	(France) JMB Racing	Ret	Ret	Ret	Ret	10	1	2	Ret	8	DNS	1	4	25
9	(Italy) Marco Zadra	(United Kingdom) Creation Autosportif		7	4	6	5	7	Ret	Ret	7	2	Ret	8	24
10	(Switzerland) Jean-Denis Délétraz	(United Kingdom) Lister Racing	4	3	5	2	9								23
11	(Austria) Franz Konrad	(Germany) Konrad Motorsport	8	Ret	Ret	9	6	Ret	Ret	Ret	2	DSQ	4	11	17
11	(Switzerland) Toni Seiler	(Germany) Konrad Motorsport	8	Ret	Ret	9	6	Ret	Ret	Ret	2	DSQ	4	11	17
12	(France) Christophe Bouchut	(France) Larbre Compétition	Ret	Ret				2	1	2					17
12	(France) Sébastien Dumez	(France) Larbre Compétition						2	1	2					17
12	(Belgium) Vincent Vosse	(France) Larbre Compétition						2	1	2					17
12	(Netherlands) Patrick Huisman	(France) Larbre Compétition						2	1	2					17
13	(Sweden) Henrik Roos	(Sweden) Roos Optima Racing Team	6	4	Ret	8	7	9	7	7	Ret	9	6	12	17
13	(Sweden) Magnus Wallinder	(Sweden) Roos Optima Racing Team	6	4	Ret	8	7	9	7	7	Ret	9	6	12	17
14	(United Kingdom) Mike Newton	(United Kingdom) Graham Nash Motorsport	9	NC	DNS	DSQ	4	10	8	5	Ret	4	7	10	16.5
14	(Brazil) Thomas Erdos	(United Kingdom) Graham Nash Motorsport	9	NC	DNS	DSQ	4	10	8	5	Ret	4	7	10	16.5
15	(Portugal) Miguel Ramos	(United Kingdom) Graham Nash Motorsport	Ret	5	7	7	DNS	10	8	5	10	6	8	Ret	16.5
16	(Belgium) David Sterckx	(United Kingdom) Lister Racing						8	4	4	3	Ret	Ret	7	16
17	(Portugal) Pedro Chaves	(United Kingdom) Graham Nash Motorsport	Ret	5	7	7	DNS	10	8	5	10	6			15.5
18	(Switzerland) Steve Zacchia	(France) Force One Racing Festina	Ret	Ret	6	Ret	3	5	9	6	11				14
19	(Netherlands) Arjan van der Zwaan	(Netherlands) Zwaan's Racing	7	Ret	8	10	DSQ	Ret	Ret	Ret	6	5	5	Ret	14
19	(Netherlands) Rob van der Zwaan	(Netherlands) Zwaan's Racing	7	Ret	8	10	DSQ	Ret	Ret	Ret	6	5	5	Ret	14
19	(Germany) Klaus Abbelen	(Netherlands) Zwaan's Racing	7	Ret	8	10	DSQ	Ret	Ret	Ret	6	5	5	Ret	14
20	(France) Boris Derichebourg	(France) JMB Racing	DNS	Ret	Ret	Ret	11	1	2	Ret	Ret	8	Ret	5	14
21	(Austria) Walter Lechner Jr.	(Germany) Konrad Motorsport						Ret	Ret	Ret	2	DSQ	4	11	13
22	(Portugal) Ni Amorim	(United Kingdom) Graham Nash Motorsport	Ret	5	7	7	DNS				10	6	8	Ret	12
23	(France) David Hallyday	(France) Force One Racing Festina	Ret	Ret		Ret	3	5	9	6		10			11
24	(France) Paul Belmondo	(France) Paul Belmondo Racing						6	3	3					10.5
24	(France) Yann Clairay	(France) Paul Belmondo Racing						6	3	3					10.5
24	(France) Emmanuel Clérico	(France) Paul Belmondo Racing						6	3	3					10.5
24	(Belgium) Pierre-Yves Corthals	(France) Paul Belmondo Racing						6	3	3					10.5
25	(Italy) Gabriele Lancieri	(United Kingdom) Lister Racing						8	4	4				7	10
26	(France) Philippe Alliot	(France) Force One Racing Festina	Ret	Ret	6	Ret	3	Ret	Ret	Ret	11	10	Ret	Ret	9
27	(United Kingdom) Gavin Pickering	(United Kingdom) Lister Racing						8	4	4					8
28	(United Kingdom) Peter Snowdon	(United Kingdom) Creation Autosportif	5												7
28	(United Kingdom) Peter Snowdon	(Sweden) Roos Optima Racing Team						9	7	7					7
29	(France) Jean-Marc Gounon	(Germany) Konrad Motorsport		Ret	Ret	9	6								6
29	(France) Jean-Marc Gounon	(United Kingdom) Care Racing						WD	WD	WD					6
29	(France) Jean-Marc Gounon	(United Kingdom) Creation Autosportif						7	Ret	Ret	7	Ret	DNS	Ret	6
30	(Italy) Christian Pescatori	(France) JMB Racing	DNS	Ret	Ret	Ret	11				Ret	8	Ret	5	5
31	(France) François Jakubowski	(France) Force One Racing Festina						5	9	6					5
31	(France) Julien Gilbert	(France) Force One Racing Festina						5	9	6					5
32	(Italy) Stefano Zonca	(France) Larbre Compétition						4	6	Ret					4
32	(Italy) Stefano Zonca	(Italy) Megadrive												13	4
33	(France) Jean-Luc Blanchemain	(France) Larbre Compétition						4	6	Ret					4
33	(Belgium) Vanina Ickx	(France) Larbre Compétition						4	6	Ret					4
33	(Finland) Pertti Kuismanen	(France) Larbre Compétition						4	6	Ret					4
34	(Germany) Wolfgang Kaufmann	(Germany) Wieth Racing	Ret	8	Ret	11	NC	Ret	Ret	Ret	9	7	Ret	Ret	3
35	(Belgium) Vincent Dupont	(Sweden) Roos Optima Racing Team						9	7	7					3
36	(United Kingdom) Paul Knapfield	(United Kingdom) Creation Autosportif									7	Ret	DNS	Ret	2
37	(Germany) Elmar Grimm	(Germany) Wieth Racing						Ret	Ret	Ret		7			2
37	(Italy) Paolo Biglieri	(Germany) Wieth Racing										7			2
38	(Germany) Niko Wieth	(Germany) Wieth Racing	Ret	8	Ret	11		Ret	Ret	Ret			Ret		1
39	(Italy) Vitorio Zoboli	(Germany) Wieth Racing	Ret	8	Ret		NC							Ret	1
40	(Portugal) António Coimbra	(United Kingdom) Graham Nash Motorsport											8	Ret	1
41	(Netherlands) Duncan Huisman	(United Kingdom) Creation Autosportif						7	Ret	Ret					1
Pos.	Driver	Team	BAR (Spain)	MAG (France)	PER (Italy)	BRN (Czech Republic)	DON (United Kingdom)	6H	12H	24H	AND (Sweden)	OSC (Germany)	EST (Portugal)	MON (Italy)	Total points
Pos.	Driver	Team	BAR (Spain)	MAG (France)	PER (Italy)	BRN (Czech Republic)	DON (United Kingdom)	SPA (Belgium)			AND (Sweden)	OSC (Germany)	EST (Portugal)	MON (Italy)	Total points

Colour	Result
Gold	Winner
Silver	Second place
Bronze	Third place
Green	Points classification
Blue	Non-points classification
Blue	Non-classified finish (NC)
Purple	Retired, not classified (Ret)
Red	Did not qualify (DNQ)
Red	Did not pre-qualify (DNPQ)
Black	Disqualified (DSQ)
White	Did not start (DNS)
White	Withdrew (WD)
White	Race cancelled (C)
Blank	Did not practice (DNP)
Blank	Did not arrive (DNA)
Blank	Excluded (EX)

=== N-GT Cup for Drivers ===
The 2003 N-GT Cup for Drivers was won by Marc Lieb & Stéphane Ortelli driving a Porsche 911 GT3-RS for Freisinger Motorsport.

Pos.	Driver	Team	BAR (Spain)	MAG (France)	PER (Italy)	BRN (Czech Republic)	DON (United Kingdom)	SPA (Belgium)			AND (Sweden)	OSC (Germany)	EST (Portugal)	MON (Italy)	Total points
Pos.	Driver	Team	BAR (Spain)	MAG (France)	PER (Italy)	BRN (Czech Republic)	DON (United Kingdom)	6H	12H	24H	AND (Sweden)	OSC (Germany)	EST (Portugal)	MON (Italy)	Total points
1	(Germany) Marc Lieb	(Germany) Freisinger Motorsport	Ret	2	Ret	1	1	1	1	1	2	5	4	2	73
1	(Monaco) Stéphane Ortelli	(Germany) Freisinger Motorsport		2	Ret	1	1	1	1	1	2	5	4	2	73
2	(Italy) Fabrizio de Simone	(France) JMB Racing	1	6	2	2	Ret	12	7	4	10	1	1	1	65
3	(Italy) Andrea Bertolini	(France) JMB Racing	1	6	2	2	Ret	Ret	Ret	Ret	10	1	1	1	59
4	(United Kingdom) Jamie Davies	(United Kingdom) Team Maranello Concessionaires	2	1	7	3	5	7	8	7	3	2	2	9	55.5
5	(United Kingdom) Tim Sugden	(United Kingdom) EMKA Racing	Ret	13	1	4	9	2	3	Ret	1	4	3	Ret	43
6	(United Kingdom) Tim Mullen	(United Kingdom) Team Maranello Concessionaires	2	1	7	3	5	6	Ret	Ret	Ret	3	9	NC	37.5
7	(United Kingdom) Darren Turner	(United Kingdom) Team Maranello Concessionaires	3	DSQ	8	10	Ret	7	8	7	3	2	2	9	32.5
8	(France) Emmanuel Collard	(United Kingdom) EMKA Racing					9	2	3	Ret	1	4	3	Ret	28
9	(Czech Republic) Robert Pergl	(Czech Republic) MenX	6	Ret	Ret	5		3	4	3	7	10	5	Ret	24.5
10	(France) Stéphane Daoudi	(Germany) RWS Yukos Motorsport	5	8	Ret	13	2	5	5	Ret	4	7	10	Ret	24
11	(France) Romain Dumas	(Germany) Freisinger Motorsport						1	1	1					20
12	(Switzerland) Gabriele Gardel	(Germany) Freisinger Motorsport	Ret	4	Ret	6	3	Ret	Ret	Ret	5	8	12	10	19
12	(Belgium) Bert Longin	(Germany) Freisinger Motorsport	Ret	4	Ret	6	3	Ret	Ret	Ret	5	8	12	10	19
13	(Czech Republic) Jaroslav Janiš	(Czech Republic) MenX						3	4	3	7		5	Ret	17.5
14	(United Kingdom) Mark Mayall	(United Kingdom) Cirtek Motorsport	8			Ret									17
14	(United Kingdom) Mark Mayall	(United Kingdom) Team Eurotech						8	6	5	6				17
14	(United Kingdom) Mark Mayall	(Germany) JVG Racing										DNS	7	4	17
15	(Russia) Aleksey Vasilyev	(Germany) RWS Yukos Motorsport	7	9	4	Ret	7	5	5	Ret	8	9	13	6	17
15	(Russia) Nikolai Fomenko	(Germany) RWS Yukos Motorsport	7	9	4	Ret	7	5	5	Ret	8	9	13	6	17
16	(United Kingdom) Martin Short	(United Kingdom) EMKA Racing	Ret	13	1	4									15
17	(United Kingdom) Mike Jordan	(United Kingdom) Team Eurotech	9	7	Ret	8	Ret	Ret	Ret	Ret		6	6	3	15
18	(Italy) Alex Caffi	(Germany) Seikel Motorsport						4	2	2					14.5
18	(Italy) Luca Drudi	(Germany) Seikel Motorsport						4	2	2					14.5
18	(Italy) Gabrio Rosa	(Germany) Seikel Motorsport						4	2	2					14.5
18	(Switzerland) Andrea Chiesa	(Germany) Seikel Motorsport						4	2	2					14.5
19	(United Kingdom) Kelvin Burt	(United Kingdom) Team Maranello Concessionaires	3	DSQ	8	10	Ret	6	Ret	Ret	Ret	3	9	NC	14.5
20	(United Kingdom) Godfrey Jones	(United Kingdom) Team Eurotech	DNS	Ret	3	7	4	Ret	Ret	Ret		11	Ret	Ret	13
20	(United Kingdom) David Jones	(United Kingdom) Team Eurotech	DNS	Ret	3	7	4	Ret	Ret	Ret		11	Ret	Ret	13
21	(United Kingdom) Ian Khan	(United Kingdom) Cirtek Motorsport	Ret	Ret		Ret									13
21	(United Kingdom) Ian Khan	(United Kingdom) Team Eurotech						8	6	5					13
21	(United Kingdom) Ian Khan	(Germany) JVG Racing										DNS	7	4	13
22	(France) Yannick Schroeder	(Czech Republic) MenX						3	4	3					11.5
23	(France) Steeve Hiesse	(France) Auto Palace	4	3	Ret	Ret								12	11
24	(France) Guillaume Gomez	(France) Auto Palace	4	3	Ret	Ret									11
24	(France) Guillaume Gomez	(Germany) Freisinger Motorsport						Ret	Ret	Ret					11
25	(United Kingdom) Adam Jones	(United Kingdom) Cirtek Motorsport	Ret	Ret											9
25	(United Kingdom) Adam Jones	(Germany) RWS Yukos Motorsport						5	5	Ret	4				9
26	(Germany) Jürgen von Gartzen	(United Kingdom) Team Eurotech						8	6	5	6				9
26	(Germany) Jürgen von Gartzen	(Germany) JVG Racing										12		13	9
27	(United Kingdom) Mark Sumpter	(United Kingdom) Team Eurotech	9	7	Ret	8	Ret	Ret	Ret	Ret		6	6		9
28	(United Kingdom) Johnny Mowlem	(Germany) RWS Yukos Motorsport					2								8
29	(Czech Republic) Tomáš Enge	(Czech Republic) MenX	6	Ret	Ret	5						10			7
30	(United Kingdom) Chris Goodwin	(United Kingdom) EMKA Racing						2	3	Ret					7
31	(United Kingdom) Guy Smith	(United Kingdom) Veloqx Racing					6								6.5
31	(United Kingdom) Guy Smith	(United Kingdom) Team Maranello Concessionaires						7	8	7					6.5
32	(United Kingdom) Rob Barff	(United Kingdom) Team Eurotech												3	6
33	(Switzerland) Iradj Alexander	(France) JMB Racing						12	7	4					6
33	(Brazil) Luciano Burti	(France) JMB Racing						12	7	4					6
34	(United Kingdom) Nigel Smith	(United Kingdom) Team Eurotech						8	6	5					6
35	(Netherlands) Peter Kutemann	(France) JMB Racing	10	11	6	11	8				11	Ret	11	7	6
35	(Netherlands) Peter Kutemann	(Netherlands) Peter Kutemann						13	Ret	Ret					6
35	(France) Antoine Gosse	(France) JMB Racing	10	11	6	11	8				11	Ret	11	7	6
35	(France) Antoine Gosse	(Netherlands) Peter Kutemann						13	Ret	Ret					6
36	(Belgium) Michel Neugarten	(Germany) JVG Racing												4	5
37	(Austria) Walter Lechner Jr.	(Germany) RWS Yukos Motorsport	5	8	Ret	13									5
38	(United Kingdom) Andrew Kirkaldy	(United Kingdom) Veloqx Racing					6								4.5
38	(United Kingdom) Andrew Kirkaldy	(United Kingdom) Team Maranello Concessionaires						6	Ret	Ret					4.5
39	(Poland) Andrzej Dziurka	(Poland) Alda Motorsport	11	10	5	12									4
39	(Poland) Wojciech Dobrzanski	(Poland) Alda Motorsport	11	10	5	12									4
40	(United Kingdom) Richard Kaye	(Spain) G-Tec	13												4
40	(United Kingdom) Richard Kaye	(United Kingdom) Cirtek Motorsport		5											4
41	(France) Xavier Pompidou	(United Kingdom) Cirtek Motorsport		5											4
41	(Italy) Gabriele Sabatini	(Italy) Autorlando Sport												5	4
41	(Italy) Marco Spinelli	(Italy) Autorlando Sport												5	4
42	(Italy) Diego Alessi	(Italy) Autorlando Sport						11	10	6			8		4
42	(Italy) Edy Gay	(Italy) Autorlando Sport						11	10	6			8		4
42	(Italy) Maurizio Mediani	(Italy) Autorlando Sport						11	10	6			8		4
43	(France) Michael Orts	(Italy) Autorlando Sport						11	10	6					3
44	(Austria) Toto Wolff	(Germany) RWS Yukos Motorsport										7	10	Ret	2
45	(Germany) Gerold Ried	(Germany) Proton Competition				9	10	15	9	Ret	9	13	Ret	8	1
45	(Germany) Christian Ried	(Germany) Proton Competition				9	10	15	9	Ret	9	13	Ret	8	1
46	(Poland) Maciej Marcinkiewicz	(Germany) Proton Competition					10							8	1
47	(Italy) Marco Zadra	(United Kingdom) Cirtek Motorsport	8												1
Pos.	Driver	Team	BAR (Spain)	MAG (France)	PER (Italy)	BRN (Czech Republic)	DON (United Kingdom)	6H	12H	24H	AND (Sweden)	OSC (Germany)	EST (Portugal)	MON (Italy)	Total points
Pos.	Driver	Team	BAR (Spain)	MAG (France)	PER (Italy)	BRN (Czech Republic)	DON (United Kingdom)	SPA (Belgium)			AND (Sweden)	OSC (Germany)	EST (Portugal)	MON (Italy)	Total points

== Teams Championship ==
Points were awarded to the top 8 finishers in the order of 10–8–6–5–4–3–2–1 except at the Spa 24 Hours, where an additional allocation of half points were awarded to the leaders at both the six-hour mark and the twelve-hour mark. Both cars scored points towards the championship regardless of finishing position.

=== FIA GT Championship for Teams ===
Pos.	Team	BAR (Spain)	MAG (France)	PER (Italy)	BRN (Czech Republic)	DON (United Kingdom)	SPA (Belgium)			AND (Sweden)	OSC (Germany)	EST (Portugal)	MON (Italy)	Total points
Pos.	Team	BAR (Spain)	MAG (France)	PER (Italy)	BRN (Czech Republic)	DON (United Kingdom)	6H	12H	24H	AND (Sweden)	OSC (Germany)	EST (Portugal)	MON (Italy)	Total points
1	(Italy) BMS Scuderia Italia	1	1	1	1	1	3	5	1	4	1	2	1	130
1	(Italy) BMS Scuderia Italia	2	2	DSQ	3	8	Ret	Ret	Ret	Ret	Ret	3	6	130
2	(United Kingdom) Lister Racing	4	3	2	2	9	8	4	4	1	Ret	Ret	3	71
2	(United Kingdom) Lister Racing	Ret	6	5	4	Ret	Ret	Ret	Ret	3	DSQ	Ret	7	71
3	(United Kingdom) Care Racing	3	Ret	3	5	2	DNS	DNS	DNS	5	3	9	2	42
4	(France) JMB Racing	Ret	Ret	Ret	Ret	10	1	2	Ret	8	8	1	4	30
4	(France) JMB Racing	DNS	Ret	Ret	Ret	11				Ret	DNS	Ret	5	30
5	(United Kingdom) Creation Autosportif	5	7	4	6	5	7	Ret	Ret	7	2	Ret	8	30
5	(United Kingdom) Creation Autosportif									Ret	Ret	DNS	Ret	30
6	(United Kingdom) Graham Nash Motorsport	9	5	7	7	4	10	8	5	10	4	7	10	28.5
6	(United Kingdom) Graham Nash Motorsport	Ret	NC	DNS	DSQ	DNS				Ret	6	8	Ret	28.5
7	(France) Larbre Compétition	Ret	Ret				2	1	2					21
7	(France) Larbre Compétition						4	6	Ret					21
8	(Germany) Konrad Motorsport	8	Ret	Ret	9	6	Ret	Ret	Ret	2	DSQ	4	11	17
9	(Sweden) Roos Optima Racing Team	6	4	Ret	8	7	9	7	7	Ret	9	6	12	17
10	(France) Force One Racing Festina	Ret	Ret	6	Ret	3	5	9	6	11	10	Ret	Ret	14
10	(France) Force One Racing Festina	Ret	Ret	Ret	Ret	Ret	Ret	Ret	Ret	Ret	Ret			14
11	(Netherlands) Zwaan's Racing	7	Ret	8	10	DSQ	Ret	Ret	Ret	6	5	5	Ret	14
12	(France) Paul Belmondo Racing						6	3	3					10.5
12	(France) Paul Belmondo Racing						11	Ret	Ret					10.5
13	(Germany) Wieth Racing	Ret	8	Ret	11	NC	Ret	Ret	Ret	9	7	Ret	Ret	3
-	(Poland) Alda Motorsport												9	0
-	(Germany) Proton Competition	10	Ret	Ret	Ret									0
-	(Italy) Megadrive												13	0
-	(Germany) Reiter Engineering												DNS	0

Colour	Result
Gold	Winner
Silver	Second place
Bronze	Third place
Green	Points classification
Blue	Non-points classification
Blue	Non-classified finish (NC)
Purple	Retired, not classified (Ret)
Red	Did not qualify (DNQ)
Red	Did not pre-qualify (DNPQ)
Black	Disqualified (DSQ)
White	Did not start (DNS)
White	Withdrew (WD)
White	Race cancelled (C)
Blank	Did not practice (DNP)
Blank	Did not arrive (DNA)
Blank	Excluded (EX)

=== N-GT Cup for Teams ===
Pos.	Team	BAR (Spain)	MAG (France)	PER (Italy)	BRN (Czech Republic)	DON (United Kingdom)	SPA (Belgium)			AND (Sweden)	OSC (Germany)	EST (Portugal)	MON (Italy)	Total points
Pos.	Team	BAR (Spain)	MAG (France)	PER (Italy)	BRN (Czech Republic)	DON (United Kingdom)	6H	12H	24H	AND (Sweden)	OSC (Germany)	EST (Portugal)	MON (Italy)	Total points
1	(Germany) Freisinger Motorsport	Ret	2	Ret	1	1	1	1	1	2	5	4	2	92
1	(Germany) Freisinger Motorsport	Ret	4	Ret	6	3	Ret	Ret	Ret	5	8	12	10	92
2	(France) JMB Racing	1	6	2	2	8	12	7	4	10	1	1	1	71
2	(France) JMB Racing	10	11	6	11	Ret	Ret	Ret	Ret	11	Ret	11	7	71
3	(United Kingdom) Team Maranello Concessionaires	2	1	7	3	5	7	8	7	3	2	2	9	70
3	(United Kingdom) Team Maranello Concessionaires	3	DSQ	8	10	Ret	6	Ret	Ret	Ret	3	9	NC	70
4	(United Kingdom) EMKA Racing	Ret	13	1	4	9	2	3	Ret	1	4	3	Ret	43
5	(Germany) RWS Yukos Motorsport	5	8	4	13	2	5	5	Ret	4	7	10	6	37
5	(Germany) RWS Yukos Motorsport	7	9	Ret	Ret	7				8	9	13	Ret	37
6	(United Kingdom) Team Eurotech	9	7	3	7	4	8	6	5	6	6	6	3	37
6	(United Kingdom) Team Eurotech	DNS	Ret	Ret	8	Ret	Ret	Ret	Ret		11	Ret	Ret	37
7	(Czech Republic) MenX	6	Ret	Ret	5		3	4	3	7	10	5	Ret	24.5
8	(Germany) Seikel Motorsport						4	2	2					14.5
8	(Germany) Seikel Motorsport						10	Ret	Ret					14.5
9	(France) Auto Palace	4	3	Ret	Ret								12	11
10	(Italy) Autorlando Sport						11	10	6			8	5	8
10	(Italy) Autorlando Sport						9	Ret	Ret					8
11	(Germany) JVG Racing										12	7	4	7
11	(Germany) JVG Racing										DNS		13	7
12	(United Kingdom) Cirtek Motorsport	8	5		Ret									5
12	(United Kingdom) Cirtek Motorsport	Ret	Ret											5
13	(Poland) Alda Motorsport	11	10	5	12									4
14	(United Kingdom) Veloqx Racing					6								3
15	(Germany) Proton Competition				9	10	15	9	Ret	9	13	Ret	8	1
-	(Italy) MAC Racing												11	0
-	(Italy) AB Motorsport	12	Ret										Ret	0
-	(France) Protonic Desbruères		12											0
-	(Spain) G-Tec	13												0
-	(Spain) Motor Competición	14												0
-	(Netherlands) Peter Kutemann						13	Ret	Ret					0
-	(Germany) T2M – Kaneko						14	Ret	Ret					0
-	(Italy) Yellow Racing											Ret	DNS	0
-	(Italy) Mastercar												Ret	0

== Bibliography ==
- Asselberghs, Denis; Richardson, Frederic (2003). 2003 FIA GT Championship Annual. Brussels: Apach Media. ISBN 978-2930354217.
