= 2004 FIA GT Zhuhai 500km =

The Track map of Zhuhai International Circuit

The 2004 FIA GT Zhuhai 500 km was the eleventh and final round the 2004 FIA GT Championship season. It took place at the Zhuhai International Circuit, China, on November 14, 2004.

Following three straight races in which AF Corse's Maserati MC12s were allowed to race but ineligible for points, the FIA finally approved the car for homologation. Although this meant that the MC12s were still restricted, Maserati was able to score their first and only points all season.

== Official results ==
Class winners in bold. Cars failing to complete 70% of winner's distance marked as Not Classified (NC).

Pos	Class	No	Team	Drivers	Chassis	Tyre	Laps
Pos	Class	No	Team	Drivers	Engine	Tyre	Laps
1	**GT**	**33**	**(Italy) AF Corse**	**(Italy) Andrea Bertolini (Finland) Mika Salo**	**Maserati MC12 GT1**	P	**113**
1	**GT**	**33**	**(Italy) AF Corse**	**(Italy) Andrea Bertolini (Finland) Mika Salo**	**Maserati 6.0L V12**	P	**113**
2	GT	34	(Italy) AF Corse	(Italy) Fabrizio de Simone (United Kingdom) Johnny Herbert	Maserati MC12 GT1	P	113
2	GT	34	(Italy) AF Corse	(Italy) Fabrizio de Simone (United Kingdom) Johnny Herbert	Maserati 6.0L V12	P	113
3	GT	1	(Italy) BMS Scuderia Italia	(Italy) Matteo Bobbi (Switzerland) Gabriele Gardel	Ferrari 550-GTS Maranello	MI	113
3	GT	1	(Italy) BMS Scuderia Italia	(Italy) Matteo Bobbi (Switzerland) Gabriele Gardel	Ferrari 5.9L V12	MI	113
4	GT	3	(United Kingdom) Care Racing Developments (Italy) BMS Scuderia Italia	(France) Christophe Bouchut (Switzerland) Enzo Calderari (Switzerland) Lilian Bryner	Ferrari 550-GTS Maranello	MI	112
4	GT	3	(United Kingdom) Care Racing Developments (Italy) BMS Scuderia Italia	(France) Christophe Bouchut (Switzerland) Enzo Calderari (Switzerland) Lilian Bryner	Ferrari 5.9L V12	MI	112
5	GT	17	(Monaco) JMB Racing	(Austria) Karl Wendlinger (Brazil) Tarso Marques (Switzerland) Iradj Alexander	Ferrari 575-GTC Maranello	MI	112
5	GT	17	(Monaco) JMB Racing	(Austria) Karl Wendlinger (Brazil) Tarso Marques (Switzerland) Iradj Alexander	Ferrari 6.0L V12	MI	112
6	GT	13	(Italy) G.P.C. Giesse Squadra Corse	(Italy) Emanuele Naspetti (Austria) Philipp Peter	Ferrari 575-GTC Maranello	P	111
6	GT	13	(Italy) G.P.C. Giesse Squadra Corse	(Italy) Emanuele Naspetti (Austria) Philipp Peter	Ferrari 6.0L V12	P	111
7	GT	8	(United Kingdom) Ray Mallock Ltd.	(United Kingdom) Chris Goodwin (United Kingdom) Michael Mallock	Saleen S7-R	D	111
7	GT	8	(United Kingdom) Ray Mallock Ltd.	(United Kingdom) Chris Goodwin (United Kingdom) Michael Mallock	Ford 7.0L V8	D	111
8	GT	11	(Italy) G.P.C. Giesse Squadra Corse	(Italy) Gianni Morbidelli (Italy) Fabio Babini	Ferrari 575-GTC Maranello	P	110
8	GT	11	(Italy) G.P.C. Giesse Squadra Corse	(Italy) Gianni Morbidelli (Italy) Fabio Babini	Ferrari 6.0L V12	P	110
9	GT	18	(Monaco) JMB Racing	(Italy) Maurizio Mediani (Belgium) Bert Longin (Russia) Sergei Zlobin	Ferrari 575-GTC Maranello	MI	109
9	GT	18	(Monaco) JMB Racing	(Italy) Maurizio Mediani (Belgium) Bert Longin (Russia) Sergei Zlobin	Ferrari 6.0L V12	MI	109
10	**N-GT**	**62**	**(Italy) G.P.C. Giesse Squadra Corse**	**(Brazil) Jaime Melo (Italy) Christian Pescatori**	**Ferrari 360 Modena GTC**	P	**109**
10	**N-GT**	**62**	**(Italy) G.P.C. Giesse Squadra Corse**	**(Brazil) Jaime Melo (Italy) Christian Pescatori**	**Ferrari 3.6L V8**	P	**109**
11	N-GT	99	(Germany) Freisinger Motorsport	(Germany) Lucas Luhr (Germany) Sascha Maassen	Porsche 911 GT3-RSR	MI	108
11	N-GT	99	(Germany) Freisinger Motorsport	(Germany) Lucas Luhr (Germany) Sascha Maassen	Porsche 3.6L Flat-6	MI	108
12	GT	2	(Italy) BMS Scuderia Italia	(Italy) Luca Drudi (Italy) Nicola Cadei (Switzerland) Frédéric Dor	Ferrari 550-GTS Maranello	MI	108
12	GT	2	(Italy) BMS Scuderia Italia	(Italy) Luca Drudi (Italy) Nicola Cadei (Switzerland) Frédéric Dor	Ferrari 5.9L V12	MI	108
13	GT	19	(Monaco) JMB	(France) Stéphane Daoudi (Italy) Mauro Casadei (Netherlands) Peter Kutemann	Ferrari 575-GTC Maranello	MI	107
13	GT	19	(Monaco) JMB	(France) Stéphane Daoudi (Italy) Mauro Casadei (Netherlands) Peter Kutemann	Ferrari 6.0L V12	MI	107
14	GT	7	(United Kingdom) Ray Mallock Ltd.	(United Kingdom) Mike Newton (Brazil) Thomas Erdos	Saleen S7-R	D	105
14	GT	7	(United Kingdom) Ray Mallock Ltd.	(United Kingdom) Mike Newton (Brazil) Thomas Erdos	Ford 7.0L V8	D	105
15	GT	10	(Netherlands) Zwaans GTR Racing Team	(Belgium) Val Hillebrand (Netherlands) Rob van der Zwaan	Chrysler Viper GTS-R	D	102
15	GT	10	(Netherlands) Zwaans GTR Racing Team	(Belgium) Val Hillebrand (Netherlands) Rob van der Zwaan	Chrysler 8.0L V10	D	102
16	N-GT	57	(Czech Republic) Vonka Racing	(Czech Republic) Jan Vonka (Slovakia) Miro Konopka	Porsche 911 GT3-R	P	100
16	N-GT	57	(Czech Republic) Vonka Racing	(Czech Republic) Jan Vonka (Slovakia) Miro Konopka	Porsche 3.6L Flat-6	P	100
17	N-GT	64	(Italy) G.P.C. Giesse Squadra Corse	(Hong Kong) Charles Kwan (United Kingdom) Matthew Marsh	Ferrari 360 Modena GT	P	99
17	N-GT	64	(Italy) G.P.C. Giesse Squadra Corse	(Hong Kong) Charles Kwan (United Kingdom) Matthew Marsh	Ferrari 3.6L V8	P	99
18	N-GT	69	(Germany) Proton Competition	(Germany) Gerold Ried (Germany) Christian Ried	Porsche 911 GT3-RS	D	97
18	N-GT	69	(Germany) Proton Competition	(Germany) Gerold Ried (Germany) Christian Ried	Porsche 3.6L Flat-6	D	97
19	GT	24	(France) DAMS	(Hong Kong) Philip Ma (China) Michael Choi Koon Ming (China) Samson Chan	Lamborghini Murciélago R-GT	MI	94
19	GT	24	(France) DAMS	(Hong Kong) Philip Ma (China) Michael Choi Koon Ming (China) Samson Chan	Lamborghini 6.0L V12	MI	94
20	GT	88	(United Kingdom) GruppeM Europe	(Germany) Marc Lieb (United Kingdom) Tim Sugden	Porsche 911 GT3-RSR	D	87
20	GT	88	(United Kingdom) GruppeM Europe	(Germany) Marc Lieb (United Kingdom) Tim Sugden	Porsche 3.6L Flat-6	D	87
21 DNF	GT	4	(Germany) Konrad Motorsport	(Greece) Alexandros Margaritis (Austria) Walter Lechner, Jr. (Austria) Franz Konrad	Saleen S7-R	P	60
21 DNF	GT	4	(Germany) Konrad Motorsport	(Greece) Alexandros Margaritis (Austria) Walter Lechner, Jr. (Austria) Franz Konrad	Ford 7.0L V8	P	60
22 DNF	N-GT	50	(Germany) Yukos Freisinger Motorsport	(France) Emmanuel Collard (Monaco) Stéphane Ortelli	Porsche 911 GT3-RSR	MI	57
22 DNF	N-GT	50	(Germany) Yukos Freisinger Motorsport	(France) Emmanuel Collard (Monaco) Stéphane Ortelli	Porsche 3.6L Flat-6	MI	57
23 DNF	N-GT	68	(Germany) Proton Competition	(Austria) Horst Felbermayr, Sr. (Austria) Horst Felbermayr, Jr.	Porsche 911 GT3-RS	D	48
23 DNF	N-GT	68	(Germany) Proton Competition	(Austria) Horst Felbermayr, Sr. (Austria) Horst Felbermayr, Jr.	Porsche 3.6L Flat-6	D	48
24 DNF	GT	28	(United Kingdom) Graham Nash Motorsport	(Italy) Paolo Ruberti (Italy) Luca Pirri-Ardizzone (Italy) Rocky Agusta	Saleen S7-R	D	45
24 DNF	GT	28	(United Kingdom) Graham Nash Motorsport	(Italy) Paolo Ruberti (Italy) Luca Pirri-Ardizzone (Italy) Rocky Agusta	Ford 7.0L V8	D	45
25 DNF	GT	5	(Germany) Vitaphone Racing Team (Germany) Konrad Motorsport	(Germany) Michael Bartels (Germany) Uwe Alzen	Saleen S7-R	P	31
25 DNF	GT	5	(Germany) Vitaphone Racing Team (Germany) Konrad Motorsport	(Germany) Michael Bartels (Germany) Uwe Alzen	Ford 7.0L V8	P	31
26 DNF	N-GT	85	(United Kingdom) RJN Motorsport	(New Zealand) Neil Cunningham (United Kingdom) Ben Collins	Nissan 350Z	D	27
26 DNF	N-GT	85	(United Kingdom) RJN Motorsport	(New Zealand) Neil Cunningham (United Kingdom) Ben Collins	Nissan VQ35 3.5L V6	D	27
27 DNF	GT	26	(France) DAMS	(Italy) Andrea Piccini (Switzerland) Jean-Denis Délétraz	Lamborghini Murciélago R-GT	MI	15
27 DNF	GT	26	(France) DAMS	(Italy) Andrea Piccini (Switzerland) Jean-Denis Délétraz	Lamborghini 6.0L V12	MI	15
28 DNF	GT	35	(Italy) Scuderia Veregra	(France) Marco Saviozzi (France) David Terrien (Lebanon) Jean-Yves Mallat	Chrysler Viper GTS-R	P	8
28 DNF	GT	35	(Italy) Scuderia Veregra	(France) Marco Saviozzi (France) David Terrien (Lebanon) Jean-Yves Mallat	Chrysler 8.0L V10	P	8
29 DNF	N-GT	77	(Germany) Yukos Freisinger Motorsport	(Russia) Nikolai Fomenko (Russia) Alexey Vasilyev	Porsche 911 GT3-RSR	MI	8
29 DNF	N-GT	77	(Germany) Yukos Freisinger Motorsport	(Russia) Nikolai Fomenko (Russia) Alexey Vasilyev	Porsche 3.6L Flat-6	MI	8
DNS	N-GT	70	(United Kingdom) Graham Nash Motorsport	(United Kingdom) Stephen Stokoe (United Kingdom) Ken McAlpine (United States) Ben Orcutt	Porsche 911 GT3-R	D	–
DNS	N-GT	70	(United Kingdom) Graham Nash Motorsport	(United Kingdom) Stephen Stokoe (United Kingdom) Ken McAlpine (United States) Ben Orcutt	Porsche 3.6L Flat-6	D	–

== Statistics ==
- Pole position – #1 BMS Scuderia Italia – 1:31.121
- Fastest lap – #1 BMS Scuderia Italia – 1:32.490
- Average speed – 160.850 km/h

FIA GT Championship
Previous race: 2004 FIA GT Dubai 500km	2004 season	Next race: None
