= 2003 FIA GT Monza 500km =

Layout of the Autodromo Nazionale Monza

The 2003 FIA GT Monza 500 km was the tenth and final round the 2003 FIA GT Championship. It took place at the Autodromo Nazionale Monza, Italy, on 19 October 2003.

== Official results ==
Class winners in bold. Cars failing to complete 70% of winner's distance marked as Not Classified (NC).

Pos	Class	No	Team	Drivers	Chassis	Tyre	Laps
Pos	Class	No	Team	Drivers	Engine	Tyre	Laps
1	**GT**	**22**	**(Italy) BMS Scuderia Italia**	**(Italy) Fabrizio Gollin (Italy) Luca Cappellari**	**Ferrari 550-GTS Maranello**	MI	**87**
1	**GT**	**22**	**(Italy) BMS Scuderia Italia**	**(Italy) Fabrizio Gollin (Italy) Luca Cappellari**	**Ferrari 5.9L V12**	MI	**87**
2	GT	21	(United Kingdom) Care Racing (Italy) BMS Scuderia Italia	(Italy) Stefano Livio (Switzerland) Lilian Bryner (Switzerland) Enzo Calderari	Ferrari 550-GTS Maranello	MI	87
2	GT	21	(United Kingdom) Care Racing (Italy) BMS Scuderia Italia	(Italy) Stefano Livio (Switzerland) Lilian Bryner (Switzerland) Enzo Calderari	Ferrari 5.9L V12	MI	87
3	GT	14	(United Kingdom) Lister Storm Racing	(United Kingdom) Jamie Campbell-Walter (United Kingdom) Nathan Kinch	Lister Storm	D	87
3	GT	14	(United Kingdom) Lister Storm Racing	(United Kingdom) Jamie Campbell-Walter (United Kingdom) Nathan Kinch	Jaguar 7.0L V12	D	87
4	GT	9	(France) JMB Racing	(Austria) Philipp Peter (Italy) Fabio Babini	Ferrari 575-GTC Maranello	P	86
4	GT	9	(France) JMB Racing	(Austria) Philipp Peter (Italy) Fabio Babini	Ferrari 6.0L V12	P	86
5	GT	10	(France) JMB Racing	(France) Boris Derichebourg (Italy) Christian Pescatori	Ferrari 575-GTC Maranello	P	86
5	GT	10	(France) JMB Racing	(France) Boris Derichebourg (Italy) Christian Pescatori	Ferrari 6.0L V12	P	86
6	GT	23	(Italy) BMS Scuderia Italia	(Italy) Matteo Bobbi (Italy) Thomas Biagi	Ferrari 550-GTS Maranello	MI	86
6	GT	23	(Italy) BMS Scuderia Italia	(Italy) Matteo Bobbi (Italy) Thomas Biagi	Ferrari 5.9L V12	MI	86
7	GT	15	(United Kingdom) Lister Storm Racing	(Italy) Andrea Piccini (Italy) Gabriele Lancieri (Belgium) David Sterckx	Lister Storm	D	86
7	GT	15	(United Kingdom) Lister Storm Racing	(Italy) Andrea Piccini (Italy) Gabriele Lancieri (Belgium) David Sterckx	Jaguar 7.0L V12	D	86
8	GT	6	(United Kingdom) Creation Autosportif	(United Kingdom) Bobby Verdon-Roe (Italy) Marco Zadra	Lister Storm	D	86
8	GT	6	(United Kingdom) Creation Autosportif	(United Kingdom) Bobby Verdon-Roe (Italy) Marco Zadra	Jaguar 7.0L V12	D	86
9	**N-GT**	**52**	**(France) JMB Racing**	**(Italy) Andrea Bertolini (Italy) Fabrizio de Simone**	**Ferrari 360 Modena GT**	P	**83**
9	**N-GT**	**52**	**(France) JMB Racing**	**(Italy) Andrea Bertolini (Italy) Fabrizio de Simone**	**Ferrari 3.6L V8**	P	**83**
10	N-GT	50	(Germany) Freisinger Motorsport	(Germany) Marc Lieb (France) Stéphane Ortelli	Porsche 911 GT3-RS	D	82
10	N-GT	50	(Germany) Freisinger Motorsport	(Germany) Marc Lieb (France) Stéphane Ortelli	Porsche 3.6L Flat-6	D	82
11	N-GT	74	(United Kingdom) Team Eurotech	(United Kingdom) Mike Jordan (United Kingdom) Rob Barff	Porsche 911 GT3-RS	D	82
11	N-GT	74	(United Kingdom) Team Eurotech	(United Kingdom) Mike Jordan (United Kingdom) Rob Barff	Porsche 3.6L Flat-6	D	82
12	N-GT	85	(Germany) JVG Racing	(United Kingdom) Ian Khan (United Kingdom) Mark Mayall (Belgium) Michel Neugarten	Porsche 911 GT3-R	P	81
12	N-GT	85	(Germany) JVG Racing	(United Kingdom) Ian Khan (United Kingdom) Mark Mayall (Belgium) Michel Neugarten	Porsche 3.6L Flat-6	P	81
13	N-GT	67	(Italy) Autorlando Sport	(Italy) Marco Spinelli (Italy) Gabriele Sabatini	Porsche 911 GT3-RS	P	81
13	N-GT	67	(Italy) Autorlando Sport	(Italy) Marco Spinelli (Italy) Gabriele Sabatini	Porsche 3.6L Flat-6	P	81
14	N-GT	77	(Germany) RWS Yukos Motorsport	(Russia) Nikolai Fomenko (Russia) Alexey Vasilyev	Porsche 911 GT3-RS	P	80
14	N-GT	77	(Germany) RWS Yukos Motorsport	(Russia) Nikolai Fomenko (Russia) Alexey Vasilyev	Porsche 3.6L Flat-6	P	80
15	N-GT	53	(France) JMB Racing	(Netherlands) Peter Kutemann (France) Antoine Gosse	Ferrari 360 Modena N-GT	P	79
15	N-GT	53	(France) JMB Racing	(Netherlands) Peter Kutemann (France) Antoine Gosse	Ferrari 3.6L V8	P	79
16	GT	38	(Poland) Alda Motorsport	(Poland) Maciej Stanco (Italy) Mauro Casadei (Italy) Moreno Soli	Porsche 911 GT2	D	79
16	GT	38	(Poland) Alda Motorsport	(Poland) Maciej Stanco (Italy) Mauro Casadei (Italy) Moreno Soli	Porsche 3.8L Turbo Flat-6	D	79
17	GT	7	(United Kingdom) Graham Nash Motorsport	(United Kingdom) Mike Newton (Brazil) Thomas Erdos	Saleen S7-R	D	78
17	GT	7	(United Kingdom) Graham Nash Motorsport	(United Kingdom) Mike Newton (Brazil) Thomas Erdos	Ford 7.0L V8	D	78
18	N-GT	69	(Germany) Proton Competition	(Germany) Christian Ried (Germany) Gerold Ried (Poland) Maciej Marcinkiewicz	Porsche 911 GT3-RS	D	78
18	N-GT	69	(Germany) Proton Competition	(Germany) Christian Ried (Germany) Gerold Ried (Poland) Maciej Marcinkiewicz	Porsche 3.6L Flat-6	D	78
19	N-GT	88	(United Kingdom) Team Maranello Concessionaires	(United Kingdom) Darren Turner (United Kingdom) Jamie Davies	Ferrari 360 Modena N-GT	D	77
19	N-GT	88	(United Kingdom) Team Maranello Concessionaires	(United Kingdom) Darren Turner (United Kingdom) Jamie Davies	Ferrari 3.6L V8	D	77
20	N-GT	51	(Germany) Freisinger Motorsport	(Belgium) Bert Longin (Switzerland) Gabriele Gardel	Porsche 911 GT3-RS	D	76
20	N-GT	51	(Germany) Freisinger Motorsport	(Belgium) Bert Longin (Switzerland) Gabriele Gardel	Porsche 3.6L Flat-6	D	76
21	N-GT	90	(Italy) MAC Racing (Italy) Scuderia Veregra	(France) Olivier Dupard (France) Pierre Bes (France) Marco Saviozzi	Porsche 911 GT3-R	P	75
21	N-GT	90	(Italy) MAC Racing (Italy) Scuderia Veregra	(France) Olivier Dupard (France) Pierre Bes (France) Marco Saviozzi	Porsche 3.6L Flat-6	P	75
22	GT	2	(Germany) Konrad Motorsport	(Austria) Franz Konrad (Austria) Walter Lechner, Jr. (Switzerland) Toni Seiler	Saleen S7-R	D	72
22	GT	2	(Germany) Konrad Motorsport	(Austria) Franz Konrad (Austria) Walter Lechner, Jr. (Switzerland) Toni Seiler	Ford 7.0L V8	D	72
23	GT	11	(Sweden) Roos Optima Racing Team	(Sweden) Henrik Roos (Sweden) Magnus Wallinder	Chrysler Viper GTS-R	D	70
23	GT	11	(Sweden) Roos Optima Racing Team	(Sweden) Henrik Roos (Sweden) Magnus Wallinder	Chrysler 8.0L V10	D	70
24	N-GT	58	(France) Auto Palace Competition	(France) Steeve Hiesse (Italy) Gianluca Ermolli	Ferrari 360 Modena GT	P	63
24	N-GT	58	(France) Auto Palace Competition	(France) Steeve Hiesse (Italy) Gianluca Ermolli	Ferrari 3.6L V8	P	63
25	N-GT	86	(Germany) JVG Racing	(Germany) Jürgen von Gartzen (Austria) Horst Felbermayr, Sr. (Austria) Horst Felbermayr, Jr.	Porsche 911 GT3-R	P	62
25	N-GT	86	(Germany) JVG Racing	(Germany) Jürgen von Gartzen (Austria) Horst Felbermayr, Sr. (Austria) Horst Felbermayr, Jr.	Porsche 3.6L Flat-6	P	62
26	GT	37	(Italy) Megadrive (Italy) Racing Box	(Italy) Stefano Zonca (Italy) Piergiuseppe Perazzini (Italy) Gabriele Matteuzzi	Chrysler Viper GTS-R	P	61
26	GT	37	(Italy) Megadrive (Italy) Racing Box	(Italy) Stefano Zonca (Italy) Piergiuseppe Perazzini (Italy) Gabriele Matteuzzi	Chrysler 8.0L V10	P	61
27 NC	N-GT	89	(United Kingdom) Team Maranello Concessionaires	(United Kingdom) Kelvin Burt (United Kingdom) Tim Mullen	Ferrari 360 Modena GT	D	58
27 NC	N-GT	89	(United Kingdom) Team Maranello Concessionaires	(United Kingdom) Kelvin Burt (United Kingdom) Tim Mullen	Ferrari 3.6L V8	D	58
28 DNF	N-GT	71	(Italy) Mastercar	(Italy) Franco Bertoli (Italy) Andrea Montermini (Italy) "Base Up"	Ferrari 360 Modena N-GT	Y	55
28 DNF	N-GT	71	(Italy) Mastercar	(Italy) Franco Bertoli (Italy) Andrea Montermini (Italy) "Base Up"	Ferrari 3.6L V8	Y	55
29 DNF	GT	5	(Switzerland) Force One Racing Festina (Netherlands) Carsport Holland	(Netherlands) Mike Hezemans (Belgium) Anthony Kumpen (France) Philippe Alliot	Chrysler Viper GTS-R	P	50
29 DNF	GT	5	(Switzerland) Force One Racing Festina (Netherlands) Carsport Holland	(Netherlands) Mike Hezemans (Belgium) Anthony Kumpen (France) Philippe Alliot	Chrysler 8.0L V10	P	50
30 DNF	N-GT	99	(Germany) RWS Yukos Motorsport	(Austria) Toto Wolff (France) Stéphane Daoudi	Porsche 911 GT3-RS	P	44
30 DNF	N-GT	99	(Germany) RWS Yukos Motorsport	(Austria) Toto Wolff (France) Stéphane Daoudi	Porsche 3.6L Flat-6	P	44
31 DNF	GT	16	(Germany) Wieth Racing	(Germany) Wolfgang Kaufmann (Italy) Vittorio Zoboli (Italy) Massimo Carli	Ferrari 550 Maranello	D	42
31 DNF	GT	16	(Germany) Wieth Racing	(Germany) Wolfgang Kaufmann (Italy) Vittorio Zoboli (Italy) Massimo Carli	Ferrari 6.0L V12	D	42
32 DNF	N-GT	64	(Italy) AB Motorsport	(Italy) Renato Premoli (Italy) Bruno Barbaro (Italy) Antonio De Castro	Porsche 911 GT3-RS	D	40
32 DNF	N-GT	64	(Italy) AB Motorsport	(Italy) Renato Premoli (Italy) Bruno Barbaro (Italy) Antonio De Castro	Porsche 3.6L Flat-6	D	40
33 DNF	N-GT	75	(United Kingdom) Team Eurotech	(United Kingdom) Godfrey Jones (United Kingdom) David Jones	Porsche 911 GT3-RS	D	28
33 DNF	N-GT	75	(United Kingdom) Team Eurotech	(United Kingdom) Godfrey Jones (United Kingdom) David Jones	Porsche 3.6L Flat-6	D	28
34 DNF	GT	18	(Netherlands) Zwaan's Racing	(Netherlands) Arjan van der Zwaan (Netherlands) Rob van der Zwaan (Germany) Klaus Abbelen	Chrysler Viper GTS-R	D	14
34 DNF	GT	18	(Netherlands) Zwaan's Racing	(Netherlands) Arjan van der Zwaan (Netherlands) Rob van der Zwaan (Germany) Klaus Abbelen	Chrysler 8.0L V10	D	14
35 DNF	GT	19	(United Kingdom) Creation Autosportif	(United Kingdom) Paul Knapfield (France) Jean-Marc Gounon	Lister Storm	D	14
35 DNF	GT	19	(United Kingdom) Creation Autosportif	(United Kingdom) Paul Knapfield (France) Jean-Marc Gounon	Jaguar 7.0L V12	D	14
36 DNF	N-GT	61	(United Kingdom) EMKA Racing	(France) Emmanuel Collard (United Kingdom) Tim Sugden	Porsche 911 GT3-R	D	10
36 DNF	N-GT	61	(United Kingdom) EMKA Racing	(France) Emmanuel Collard (United Kingdom) Tim Sugden	Porsche 3.6L Flat-6	D	10
37 DNF	GT	8	(United Kingdom) Graham Nash Motorsport	(Portugal) Ni Amorim (Portugal) Miguel Ramos (Portugal) António Coimbra	Saleen S7-R	D	5
37 DNF	GT	8	(United Kingdom) Graham Nash Motorsport	(Portugal) Ni Amorim (Portugal) Miguel Ramos (Portugal) António Coimbra	Ford 7.0L V8	D	5
38 DNF	N-GT	57	(Czech Republic) MenX	(Czech Republic) Jaroslav Janiš (Czech Republic) Robert Pergl	Ferrari 360 Modena GT	D	2
38 DNF	N-GT	57	(Czech Republic) MenX	(Czech Republic) Jaroslav Janiš (Czech Republic) Robert Pergl	Ferrari 3.6L V8	D	2
DNS	GT	36	(Germany) Reiter Engineering	(Italy) Rinaldo Capello (Denmark) Tom Kristensen	Lamborghini Murciélago R-GT	MI	–
DNS	GT	36	(Germany) Reiter Engineering	(Italy) Rinaldo Capello (Denmark) Tom Kristensen	Lamborghini 6.0L V12	MI	–
DNS	N-GT	70	(Italy) Yellow Racing	(Italy) Fabio Venier (France) Jonathan Cochet	Ferrari 360 Challenge	P	–
DNS	N-GT	70	(Italy) Yellow Racing	(Italy) Fabio Venier (France) Jonathan Cochet	Ferrari 3.6L V8	P	–

== Statistics ==
- Pole position – #5 Force One Racing Festina – 1:43.559
- Fastest lap – #2 Konrad Motorsport – 1:45.649
- Average speed – 188.720 km/h

FIA GT Championship
Previous race: 2003 FIA GT Estoril 500km	2003 season	Next race: None
