= 2004 FIA GT Dubai 500km =

The layout of the Dubai Autodrome.

The 2004 FIA GT Dubai 500 km was the tenth round the 2004 FIA GT Championship season. It took place at the Dubai Autodrome, United Arab Emirates, on October 8, 2004.

== Official results ==
Class winners in bold. Cars failing to complete 70% of winner's distance marked as Not Classified (NC).

| Pos | Class | No | Team | Drivers | Chassis | Tyre | Laps |
| Pos | Class | No | Team | Drivers | Engine | Tyre | Laps |
|---|---|---|---|---|---|---|---|
| 1 | **GT** | **1** | **(Italy) BMS Scuderia Italia** | **(Italy) Matteo Bobbi (Switzerland) Gabriele Gardel** | **Ferrari 550-GTS Maranello** | MI | **88** |
| 1 | **GT** | **1** | **(Italy) BMS Scuderia Italia** | **(Italy) Matteo Bobbi (Switzerland) Gabriele Gardel** | **Ferrari 5.9L V12** | MI | **88** |
| 2 | GT | 34 | (Italy) AF Corse | (Italy) Fabrizio de Simone (United Kingdom) Johnny Herbert | Maserati MC12 GT1 | P | 88 |
| 2 | GT | 34 | (Italy) AF Corse | (Italy) Fabrizio de Simone (United Kingdom) Johnny Herbert | Maserati 6.0L V12 | P | 88 |
| 3 | GT | 3 | (United Kingdom) Care Racing Developments (Italy) BMS Scuderia Italia | (Italy) Thomas Biagi (Switzerland) Enzo Calderari (Switzerland) Lilian Bryner | Ferrari 550-GTS Maranello | MI | 88 |
| 3 | GT | 3 | (United Kingdom) Care Racing Developments (Italy) BMS Scuderia Italia | (Italy) Thomas Biagi (Switzerland) Enzo Calderari (Switzerland) Lilian Bryner | Ferrari 5.9L V12 | MI | 88 |
| 4 | GT | 5 | (Germany) Vitaphone Racing Team (Germany) Konrad Motorsport | (Germany) Michael Bartels (Germany) Uwe Alzen | Saleen S7-R | P | 88 |
| 4 | GT | 5 | (Germany) Vitaphone Racing Team (Germany) Konrad Motorsport | (Germany) Michael Bartels (Germany) Uwe Alzen | Ford 7.0L V8 | P | 88 |
| 5 | GT | 2 | (Italy) BMS Scuderia Italia | (Italy) Fabrizio Gollin (Italy) Luca Cappellari | Ferrari 550-GTS Maranello | MI | 87 |
| 5 | GT | 2 | (Italy) BMS Scuderia Italia | (Italy) Fabrizio Gollin (Italy) Luca Cappellari | Ferrari 5.9L V12 | MI | 87 |
| 6 | GT | 11 | (Italy) G.P.C. Giesse Squadra Corse | (Italy) Gianni Morbidelli (Italy) Fabio Babini | Ferrari 575-GTC Maranello | P | 86 |
| 6 | GT | 11 | (Italy) G.P.C. Giesse Squadra Corse | (Italy) Gianni Morbidelli (Italy) Fabio Babini | Ferrari 6.0L V12 | P | 86 |
| 7 | **N-GT** | **99** | **(Germany) Freisinger Motorsport** | **(Germany) Lucas Luhr (Germany) Sascha Maassen** | **Porsche 911 GT3-RSR** | MI | **86** |
| 7 | **N-GT** | **99** | **(Germany) Freisinger Motorsport** | **(Germany) Lucas Luhr (Germany) Sascha Maassen** | **Porsche 3.6L Flat-6** | MI | **86** |
| 8 | N-GT | 50 | (Germany) Yukos Freisinger Motorsport | (France) Emmanuel Collard (Monaco) Stéphane Ortelli | Porsche 911 GT3-RSR | MI | 85 |
| 8 | N-GT | 50 | (Germany) Yukos Freisinger Motorsport | (France) Emmanuel Collard (Monaco) Stéphane Ortelli | Porsche 3.6L Flat-6 | MI | 85 |
| 9 | GT | 7 | (United Kingdom) Ray Mallock Ltd. | (United Kingdom) Mike Newton (Brazil) Thomas Erdos | Saleen S7-R | D | 85 |
| 9 | GT | 7 | (United Kingdom) Ray Mallock Ltd. | (United Kingdom) Mike Newton (Brazil) Thomas Erdos | Ford 7.0L V8 | D | 85 |
| 10 | N-GT | 62 | (Italy) G.P.C. Giesse Squadra Corse | (Brazil) Jaime Melo (Italy) Christian Pescatori | Ferrari 360 Modena GTC | P | 85 |
| 10 | N-GT | 62 | (Italy) G.P.C. Giesse Squadra Corse | (Brazil) Jaime Melo (Italy) Christian Pescatori | Ferrari 3.6L V8 | P | 85 |
| 11 | GT | 28 | (United Kingdom) Graham Nash Motorsport | (Italy) Paolo Ruberti (Italy) Gabriele Lancieri (Italy) Rocky Agusta | Saleen S7-R | D | 84 |
| 11 | GT | 28 | (United Kingdom) Graham Nash Motorsport | (Italy) Paolo Ruberti (Italy) Gabriele Lancieri (Italy) Rocky Agusta | Ford 7.0L V8 | D | 84 |
| 12 | N-GT | 88 | (United Kingdom) GruppeM Europe | (Germany) Marc Lieb (United Kingdom) Tim Sugden | Porsche 911 GT3-RSR | D | 84 |
| 12 | N-GT | 88 | (United Kingdom) GruppeM Europe | (Germany) Marc Lieb (United Kingdom) Tim Sugden | Porsche 3.6L Flat-6 | D | 84 |
| 13 | GT | 19 | (Monaco) JMB | (France) Stéphane Daoudi (Italy) Andrea Garbagnati (Netherlands) Peter Kutemann | Ferrari 575-GTC Maranello | MI | 82 |
| 13 | GT | 19 | (Monaco) JMB | (France) Stéphane Daoudi (Italy) Andrea Garbagnati (Netherlands) Peter Kutemann | Ferrari 6.0L V12 | MI | 82 |
| 14 | N-GT | 64 | (Italy) G.P.C. Giesse Squadra Corse | (Italy) Luca Drudi (Italy) Marco Lambertini (Belgium) Vincent Vosse | Ferrari 360 Modena GT | P | 82 |
| 14 | N-GT | 64 | (Italy) G.P.C. Giesse Squadra Corse | (Italy) Luca Drudi (Italy) Marco Lambertini (Belgium) Vincent Vosse | Ferrari 3.6L V8 | P | 82 |
| 15 | N-GT | 77 | (Germany) Yukos Freisinger Motorsport | (Russia) Nikolai Fomenko (Russia) Alexey Vasilyev | Porsche 911 GT3-RSR | MI | 82 |
| 15 | N-GT | 77 | (Germany) Yukos Freisinger Motorsport | (Russia) Nikolai Fomenko (Russia) Alexey Vasilyev | Porsche 3.6L Flat-6 | MI | 82 |
| 16 | GT | 13 | (Italy) G.P.C. Giesse Squadra Corse | (Italy) Emanuele Naspetti (Austria) Philipp Peter | Ferrari 575-GTC Maranello | P | 81 |
| 16 | GT | 13 | (Italy) G.P.C. Giesse Squadra Corse | (Italy) Emanuele Naspetti (Austria) Philipp Peter | Ferrari 6.0L V12 | P | 81 |
| 17 | N-GT | 69 | (Germany) Proton Competition | (Germany) Gerold Ried (Germany) Christian Ried | Porsche 911 GT3-RS | D | 80 |
| 17 | N-GT | 69 | (Germany) Proton Competition | (Germany) Gerold Ried (Germany) Christian Ried | Porsche 3.6L Flat-6 | D | 80 |
| 18 | N-GT | 68 | (Germany) Proton Competition | (Austria) Horst Felbermayr, Sr. (Austria) Horst Felbermayr, Jr. | Porsche 911 GT3-RS | D | 78 |
| 18 | N-GT | 68 | (Germany) Proton Competition | (Austria) Horst Felbermayr, Sr. (Austria) Horst Felbermayr, Jr. | Porsche 3.6L Flat-6 | D | 78 |
| 19 | GT | 35 | (Italy) Scuderia Veregra | (France) Anthony Beltoise (India) Narain Karthikeyan (United Arab Emirates) Maktoum Hasher Al Maktoum | Chrysler Viper GTS-R | P | 78 |
| 19 | GT | 35 | (Italy) Scuderia Veregra | (France) Anthony Beltoise (India) Narain Karthikeyan (United Arab Emirates) Maktoum Hasher Al Maktoum | Chrysler 8.0L V10 | P | 78 |
| 20 | N-GT | 57 | (Czech Republic) Vonka Racing | (Czech Republic) Jan Vonka (Slovakia) Miro Konopka | Porsche 911 GT3-R | P | 77 |
| 20 | N-GT | 57 | (Czech Republic) Vonka Racing | (Czech Republic) Jan Vonka (Slovakia) Miro Konopka | Porsche 3.6L Flat-6 | P | 77 |
| 21 | N-GT | 70 | (United Kingdom) Graham Nash Motorsport | (United Kingdom) Rob Croydon (United Kingdom) Del Bennett (United Kingdom) David Ovey | Porsche 911 GT3-R | D | 76 |
| 21 | N-GT | 70 | (United Kingdom) Graham Nash Motorsport | (United Kingdom) Rob Croydon (United Kingdom) Del Bennett (United Kingdom) David Ovey | Porsche 3.6L Flat-6 | D | 76 |
| 22 | GT | 10 | (Netherlands) Zwaans GTR Racing Team | (Belgium) Val Hillebrand (Belgium) Stéphane Lemeret (Sweden) Henrik Roos | Chrysler Viper GTS-R | D | 69 |
| 22 | GT | 10 | (Netherlands) Zwaans GTR Racing Team | (Belgium) Val Hillebrand (Belgium) Stéphane Lemeret (Sweden) Henrik Roos | Chrysler 8.0L V10 | D | 69 |
| 23 | GT | 4 | (Germany) Konrad Motorsport | (Greece) Alexandros Margaritis (Austria) Walter Lechner, Jr. (Switzerland) Toni Seiler | Saleen S7-R | P | 67 |
| 23 | GT | 4 | (Germany) Konrad Motorsport | (Greece) Alexandros Margaritis (Austria) Walter Lechner, Jr. (Switzerland) Toni Seiler | Ford 7.0L V8 | P | 67 |
| 24 | GT | 18 | (Monaco) JMB Racing | (United Kingdom) Chris Buncombe (Belgium) Bert Longin (Russia) Sergei Zlobin | Ferrari 575-GTC Maranello | MI | 67 |
| 24 | GT | 18 | (Monaco) JMB Racing | (United Kingdom) Chris Buncombe (Belgium) Bert Longin (Russia) Sergei Zlobin | Ferrari 6.0L V12 | MI | 67 |
| 25 DNF | GT | 8 | (United Kingdom) Ray Mallock Ltd. | (United Kingdom) Chris Goodwin (Portugal) José Pedro Fontes | Saleen S7-R | D | 58 |
| 25 DNF | GT | 8 | (United Kingdom) Ray Mallock Ltd. | (United Kingdom) Chris Goodwin (Portugal) José Pedro Fontes | Ford 7.0L V8 | D | 58 |
| 26 DNF | GT | 24 | (France) DAMS | (Italy) Andrea Piccini (Switzerland) Jean-Denis Délétraz (Switzerland) Neel Jani | Lamborghini Murciélago R-GT | MI | 55 |
| 26 DNF | GT | 24 | (France) DAMS | (Italy) Andrea Piccini (Switzerland) Jean-Denis Délétraz (Switzerland) Neel Jani | Lamborghini 6.0L V12 | MI | 55 |
| 27 DNF | GT | 17 | (Monaco) JMB Racing | (Austria) Karl Wendlinger (Brazil) Tarso Marques | Ferrari 575-GTC Maranello | MI | 47 |
| 27 DNF | GT | 17 | (Monaco) JMB Racing | (Austria) Karl Wendlinger (Brazil) Tarso Marques | Ferrari 6.0L V12 | MI | 47 |
| 28 DNF | GT | 33 | (Italy) AF Corse | (Italy) Andrea Bertolini (Finland) Mika Salo | Maserati MC12 GT1 | P | 42 |
| 28 DNF | GT | 33 | (Italy) AF Corse | (Italy) Andrea Bertolini (Finland) Mika Salo | Maserati 6.0L V12 | P | 42 |
| 29 DNF | GT | 26 | (France) DAMS | (Italy) Beppe Gabbiani (Bolivia) Filipe Ortiz | Lamborghini Murciélago R-GT | MI | 28 |
| 29 DNF | GT | 26 | (France) DAMS | (Italy) Beppe Gabbiani (Bolivia) Filipe Ortiz | Lamborghini 6.0L V12 | MI | 28 |

== Statistics ==
- Pole position – #1 BMS Scuderia Italia – 1:56.182
- Fastest lap – #1 BMS Scuderia Italia – 1:56.936
- Average speed – 158.060 km/h

FIA GT Championship
| Previous race: 2004 FIA GT Oschersleben 500km | 2004 season | Next race: 2004 FIA GT Zhuhai 500km |
