= Fabio Babini =

Italian professional racing driver

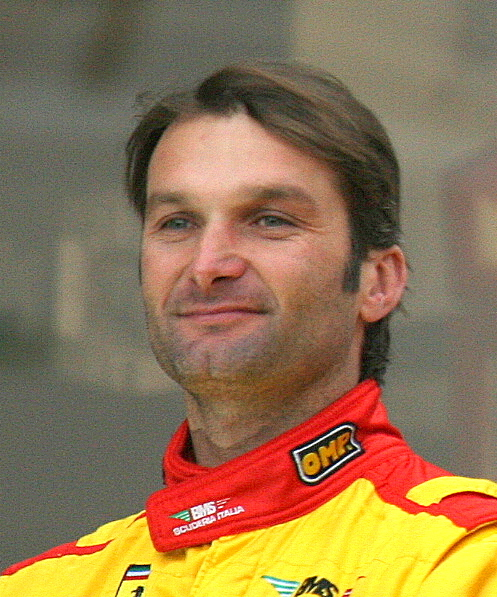
- Babini during the 2008 24 Hours of Le Mans
- Nationality: (Italy) Italian
- Born: 3 November 1969 (age 57) Faenza, Italy
- Categorisation: FIA Platinum (until 2016); FIA Gold (2017–2025); FIA Silver (2026–)

24 Hours of Le Mans career
- Years: 2000 – 2001, 2003, 2006 – 2009. 2018
- Teams: Haberthur Racing, Seikel Motorsport, JMB Racing, BMS Scuderia Italia
- Best finish: 6th (2001)
- Class wins: 1 (2001)

Fabio Babini (born 3 November 1969) is an Italian professional racing driver and entrepreneur.

Born in Faenza, Babini started his career in single-seaters in Italian F3, becoming a test driver for the Reynard brand before moving on to the Italian GT Series (1995–1997) and Russian Formula Three (1997–1999).

Upon switching to sports car racing, Babini won the 2000 24 Hours of Daytona and 2001 24 Hours of Le Mans in class and soon became a mainstay of the FIA GT Championship. He raced prominently for Porsche, Chrysler, Ferrari, Maserati and Aston Martin from 2001 to 2009. Babini later served as a Lamborghini works driver, winning titles in Super Trofeo Europe (2009, 2011) and Le Mans Cup (2017), as well as the 2015 Blancpain Endurance Series opener.

== Racing record ==
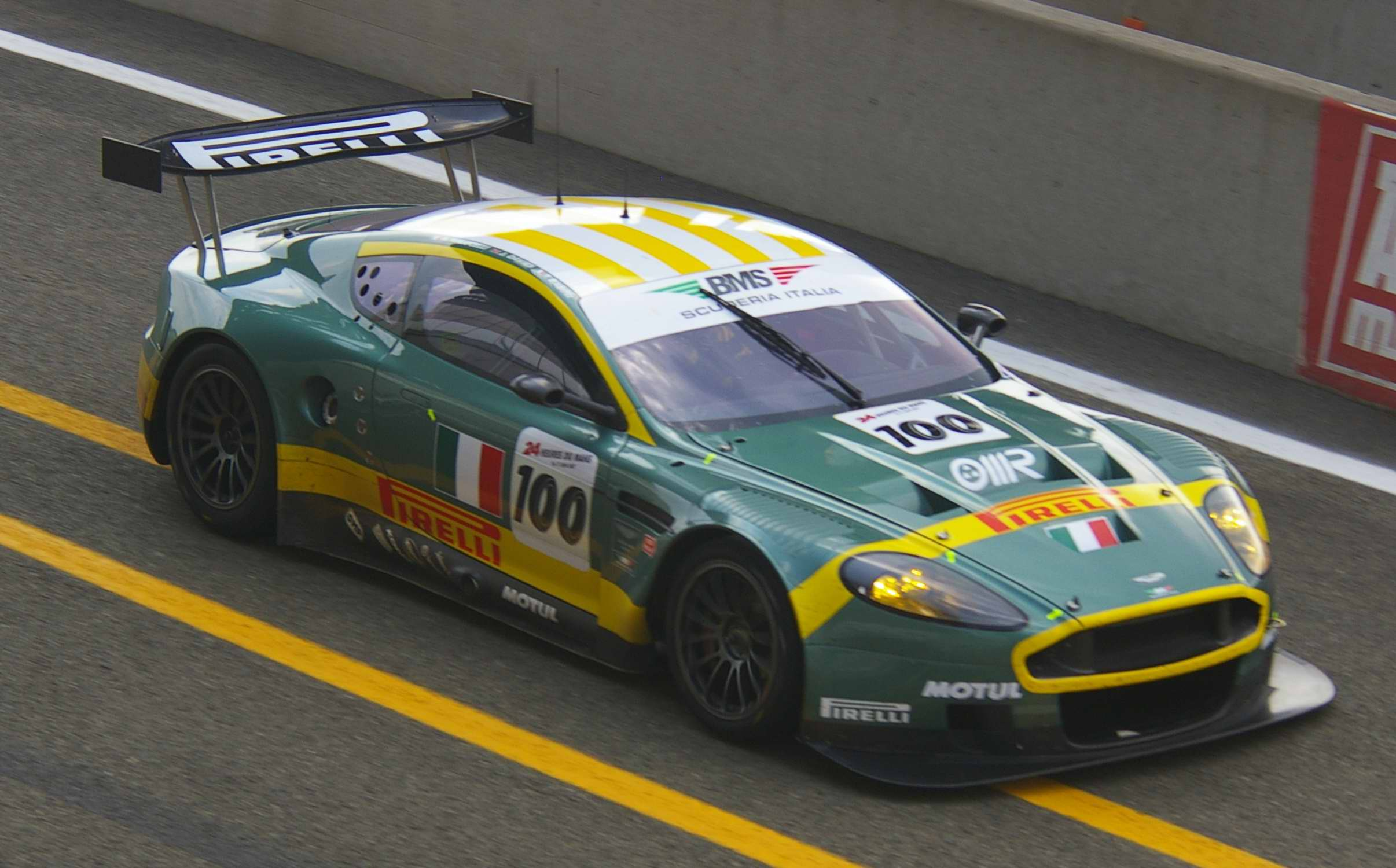
Babini's No. 100 Aston Martin DBR9 during the 2007 24 Hours of Le Mans

=== Complete FIA GT Championship results ===
(key) (Races in bold indicate pole position) (Races in italics indicate fastest lap)

| Year | Team | Car | Class | 1 | 2 | 3 | 4 | 5 | 6 | 7 | 8 | 9 | 10 | 11 | Pos. | Pts |
|---|---|---|---|---|---|---|---|---|---|---|---|---|---|---|---|---|
| 1999 | Ebimotors | Porsche 911 GT2 | GT | MNZ; Ret | SIL | HOC | HUN | ZOL | OSC | DON | HMS | WGL | ZHU | | NC | 0 |
| 2000 | Haberthur Racing | Porsche 911 GT3-R | N-GT | VAL | EST | MNZ; Ret | SIL | HUN | ZOL | A1R | LAU | BRN | MAG | | NC | 0 |
| 2001 | ART Engineering | Porsche 911 GT3-RS | N-GT | MNZ; 4 | BRN; 9 | MAG; Ret | SIL; 2 | ZOL; 1 | HUN; 3 | SPA; 5 | A1R; 7 | NÜR; Ret | JAR; 3 | EST; 5 | 6th | 33 |
| 2002 | Paul Belmondo Racing | Chrysler Viper GTS-R | GT | MAG; Ret | SIL; 1 | BRN; 5 | JAR; 11 | AND; Ret | OSC; 3 | SPA; 4 | PER; 3 | DON; 3 | EST; 6 | | 6th | 33 |
| 2003 | JMB Racing | Ferrari 550 Maranello | GT | CAT; Ret | MAG; Ret | PER; Ret | BRN; Ret | DON; 10 | SPA; Ret | AND; 8 | OSC; DNS | EST; 1 | MNZ; 4 | | 8th | 25 |
| 2004 | GPC Giesse Squadra Corse | Ferrari 575 GTC | GT | MNZ; 3 | VAL; Ret | MAG; 6 | HOC; 6 | BRN; 4 | DON; 3 | SPA; 2 | IMO; 5 | OSC; 7 | DUB; 5 | ZHU; 8 | 4th | 51 |
| 2005 | Vitaphone Racing Team | Maserati MC12 GT1 | GT1 | MNZ; 3 | MAG; 3 | SIL; 1 | IMO; 3 | BRN; Ret | SPA; Ret | OSC; 1 | IST; 2 | ZHU; 4 | DUB; 5 | BHR; 9 | 4th | 63 |
| 2006 | Aston Martin Racing BMS | Aston Martin DBR9 | GT1 | SIL; 3 | BRN; 3 | OSC; 5 | SPA; 4 | LEC; 5 | DIJ; 6 | MUG; 5 | HUN; 3 | ADR; 4 | **DUB**; 4 | | 6th | 51 |
| 2007 | Aston Martin Racing BMS | Aston Martin DBR9 | GT1 | ZHU; 4 | SIL; 7 | BUC; 7 | MNZ; 6 | OSC; 3 | SPA; Ret | ADR; 3 | BRN; 11 | NOG; 4 | ZOL; Ret | | 8th | 30 |
| 2008 | Scuderia Ecosse | Ferrari F430 GTC | GT2 | SIL; 10 | MNZ; 4 | ADR; 4 | OSC; 10 | SPA; 8 | BUC1; 7 | BUC1; 4 | BRN; 8 | NOG; 6 | ZOL; 8 | SAN; 7 | 12th | 24.5 |
| 2009 | BMS Scuderia Italia | Ferrari F430 GTC | GT2 | SIL | ADR | OSC | SPA; Ret | HUN | POR | LEC | ZOL | | | | NC | 0 |

=== 24 Hours of Le Mans results ===
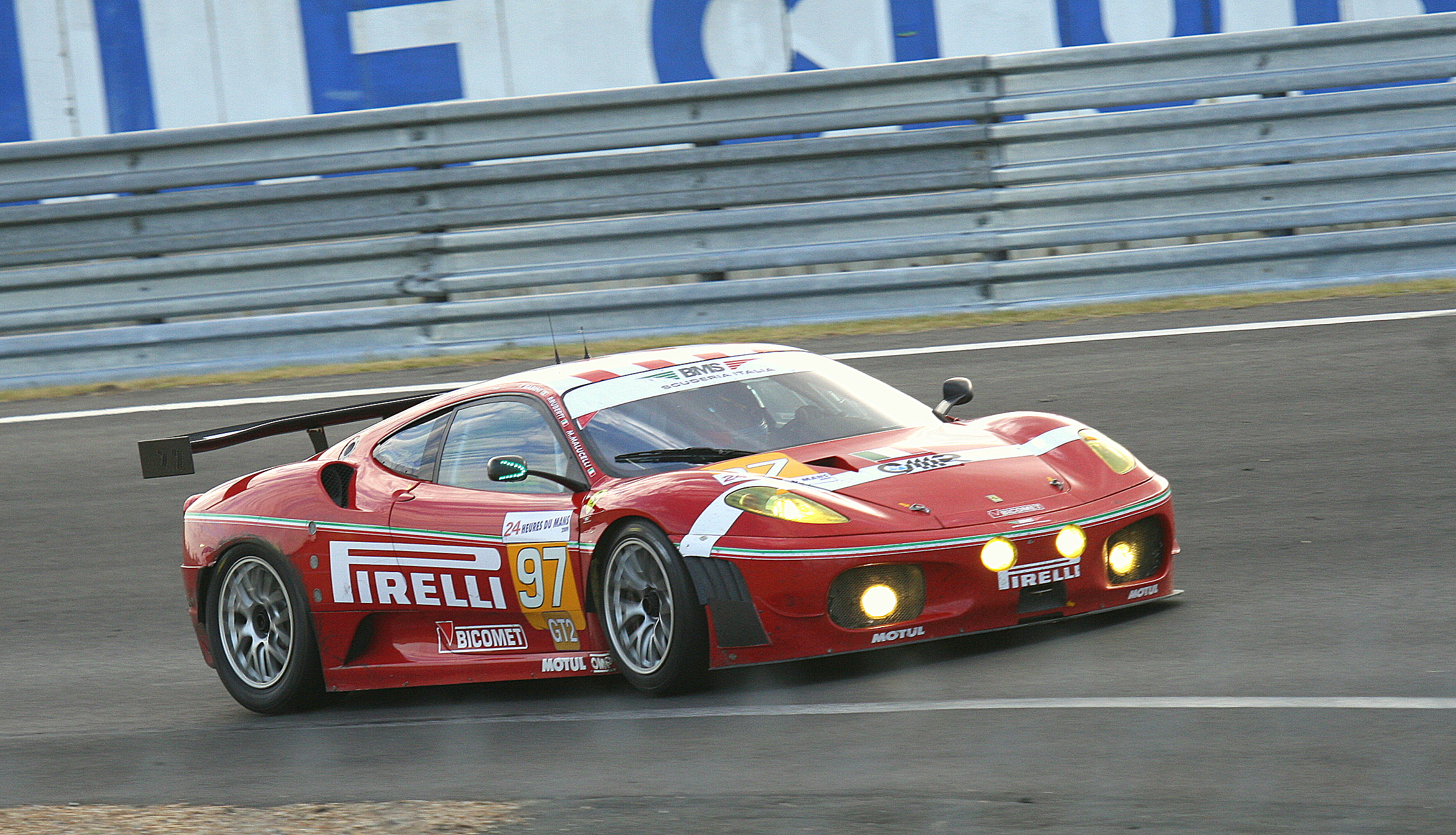
Babini's No. 97 Ferrari F430 GT2 during the 2008 24 Hours of Le Mans

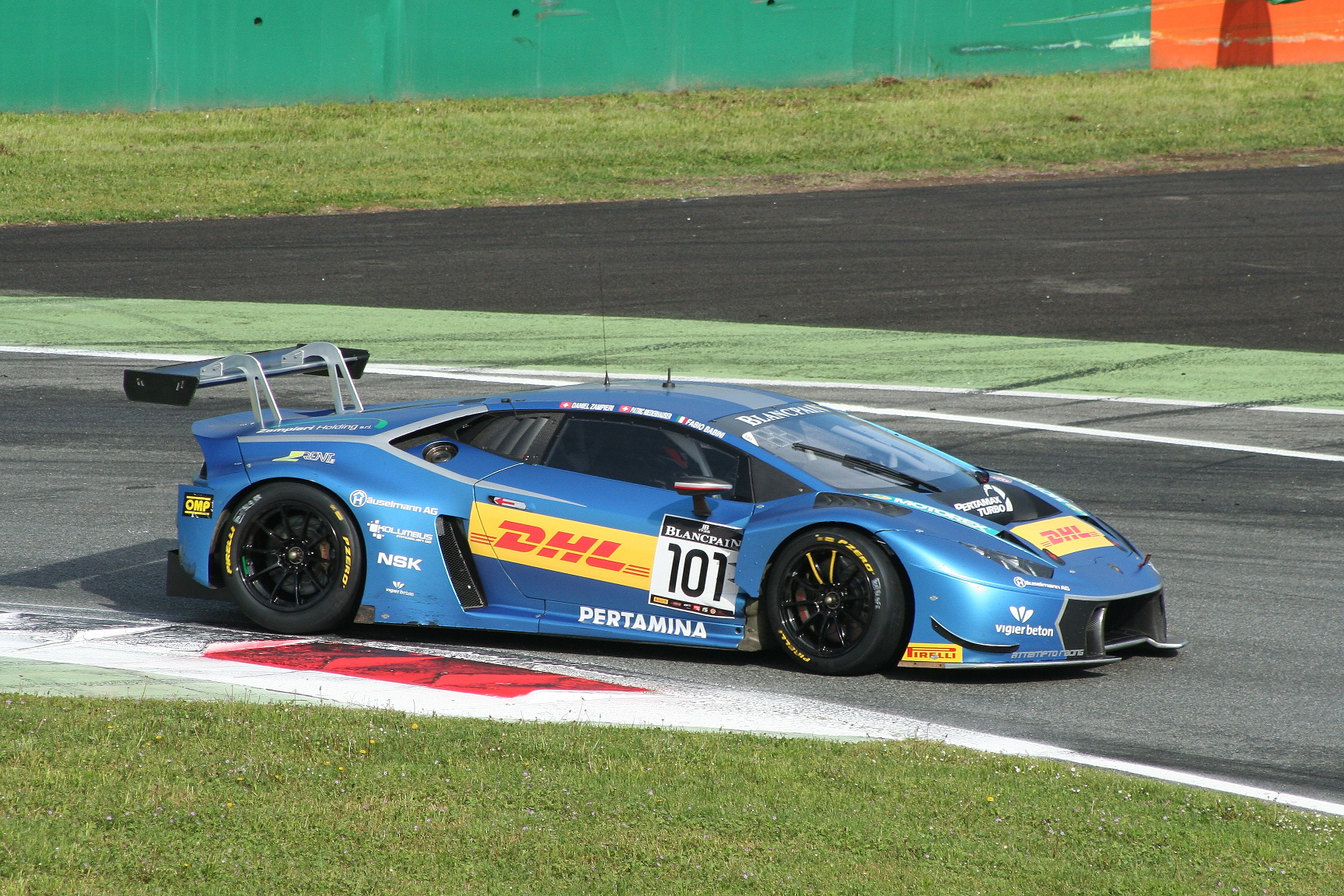
Babini at the wheel of a Lamborghini Huracán GT3 at Monza in 2016

| Year | Team | Co-Drivers | Car | Class | Laps | Pos. | Class Pos. |
|---|---|---|---|---|---|---|---|
| 2000 | (Switzerland) Haberthur Racing | (Italy) Gabrio Rosa (France) Michele Ligonnet | Porsche 911 GT3-R | GT | 310 | DNF | DNF |
| 2001 | (Germany) Seikel Motorsport | (Italy) Gabrio Rosa (Italy) Luca Drudi | Porsche 911 GT3-RS | GT | 283 | 6th | **1st** |
| 2003 | (France) JMB Racing | (France) David Terrien (Italy) Fabrizio de Simone | Ferrari 360 Modena GT | GT | 273 | 25th | 7th |
| 2006 | (Italy) BMS Scuderia Italia | (Italy) Fabrizio Gollin (Italy) Christian Pescatori | Aston Martin DBR9 | GT1 | 3 | DNF | DNF |
| 2007 | (Italy) Aston Martin Racing BMS | (United Kingdom) Jamie Davies (Italy) Matteo Malucelli | Aston Martin DBR9 | GT1 | 336 | 11th | 6th |
| 2008 | (Italy) BMS Scuderia Italia | (Italy) Matteo Malucelli (Italy) Paolo Ruberti | Ferrari F430 GT2 | GT2 | 318 | 22nd | **2nd** |
| 2009 | (Italy) BMS Scuderia Italia | (Italy) Matteo Malucelli (Italy) Paolo Ruberti | Ferrari F430 GT2 | GT2 | 327 | 19th | **2nd** |
| 2018 | (Italy) Ebimotors | (Denmark) Christina Nielsen (France) Erik Maris | Porsche 911 RSR | GTE; Am | 332 | 31st | 6th |
