= Ferrari Maranello Series =

The Ferrari Maranello name refers to two models:

- 1996–2001: Ferrari 550 Maranello, the original 5.5 litre V12 engined Ferrari Maranello car
- 2002–2006: Ferrari 575M Maranello, an updated 550 Maranello with a bigger 5.7 litre engine, and some minor styling tweaks.
