= Ferrari 575M Maranello =

Grand Tourer produced by Ferrari from 2002–2006 as a successor to the Ferrari 550

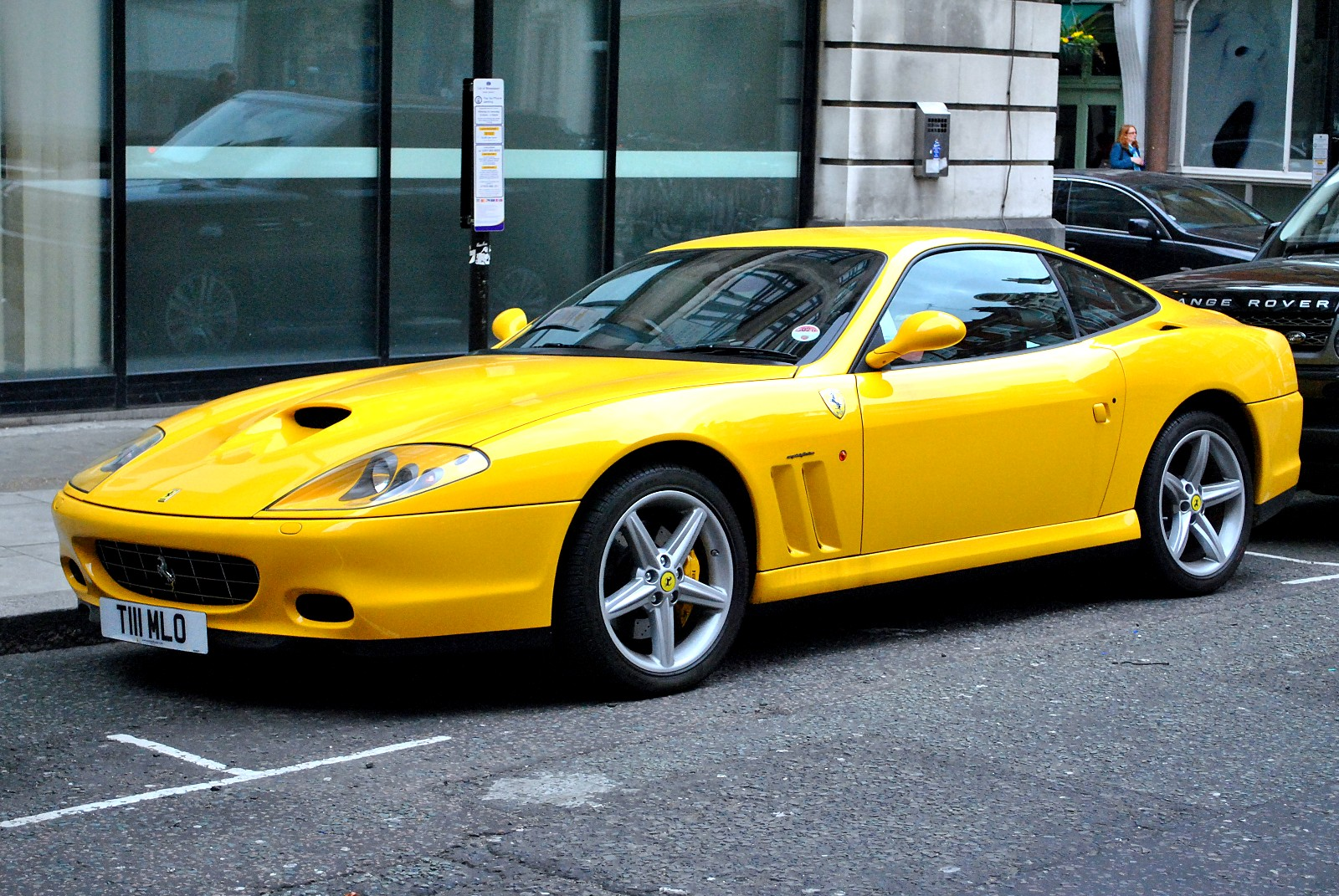

Overview
- Manufacturer: Ferrari
- Production: 2002–2006; 2,056 produced
- Assembly: Italy: Maranello
- Designer: Lorenzo Ramaciotti at Pininfarina

Body and chassis
- Class: Grand tourer (S)
- Body style: 2-door berlinetta 2-door retractable hard-top convertible (Superamerica)
- Layout: Front-engine, rear-wheel-drive

Powertrain
- Engine: 5.7 L F133 E/G V12
- Power output: 575M Maranello: 515 PS (379 kW; 508 hp); Superamerica: 540 PS (397 kW; 533 hp)
- Transmission: 6-speed manual 6-speed "F1" Graziano automated manual

Dimensions
- Wheelbase: 2,500 mm (98.4 in)
- Length: 4,550 mm (179.1 in)
- Width: 1,935 mm (76.2 in)
- Height: 1,277 mm (50.3 in)
- Curb weight: 1,853 kg (4,085 lb); 1,905 kg (4,200 lb) (Superamerica)

Chronology
- Predecessor: Ferrari 550 Maranello
- Successor: Ferrari 599 GTB Fiorano

The Ferrari 575M Maranello (Type F133) is a two-seat, two-door, grand tourer manufactured by Italian automobile manufacturer Ferrari. Launched in 2002, it is essentially an updated 550 Maranello featuring minor styling changes from Pininfarina. The 575M was replaced by the 599 GTB in the first half of 2006.

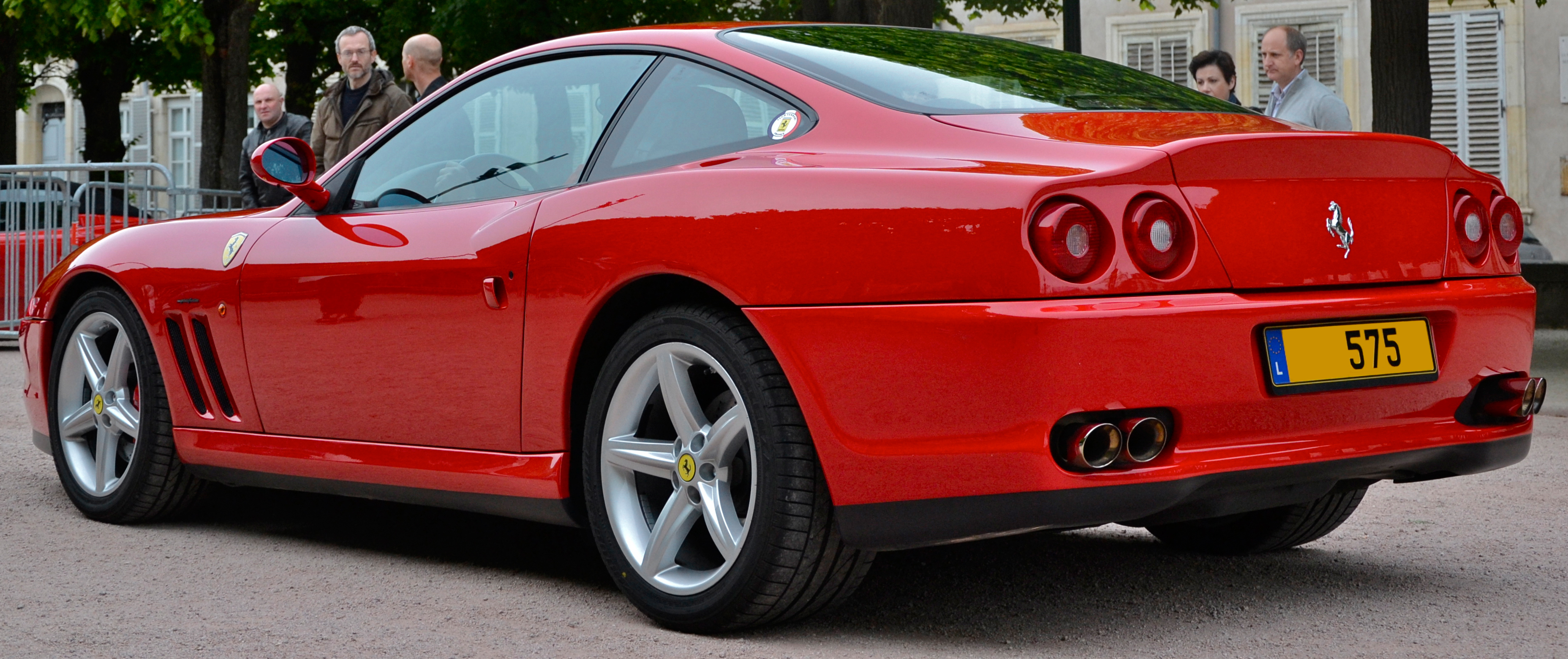
Ferrari 575M Maranello (rear)

Updates from the 550 included a redesigned interior as well as a number of mechanical improvements, including bigger brake discs, a larger and more powerful engine, improved weight distribution, refined aerodynamics and fluid-dynamics along with an adaptive suspension set-up (the four independent suspensions are also controlled by the gearbox, to minimize pitch throughout the 200-milliseconds shift time). Two six-speed transmissions were offered: a conventional gated manual and, for the first time on a Ferrari V12, an "F1" automated manual gearbox built by Graziano Trasmissioni. Both used the same single-clutch transmission unit, but the F1 system's electro-hydraulic actuation made it 50% quicker, completing gear changes in 200 milliseconds compared with 300 milliseconds for the manual. The F1 transmission was Ferrari's first model to have "launch control." The F1 transmission added $10,000 to the price of a new car.

The 575 model number refers to total engine displacement in centiliters, whilst the 'M' is an abbreviation of modificata ("modified").

For 2005, the company released a GTC handling package and a Superamerica version (a limited run of 559 retractable hardtop variants of the coupé), along with raising the power from 515 PS (379 kW; 508 hp) to 540 PS (397 kW; 533 hp).

A total of 2,056 cars were produced, including 246 with manual transmissions.

== Specifications ==
=== Engine ===
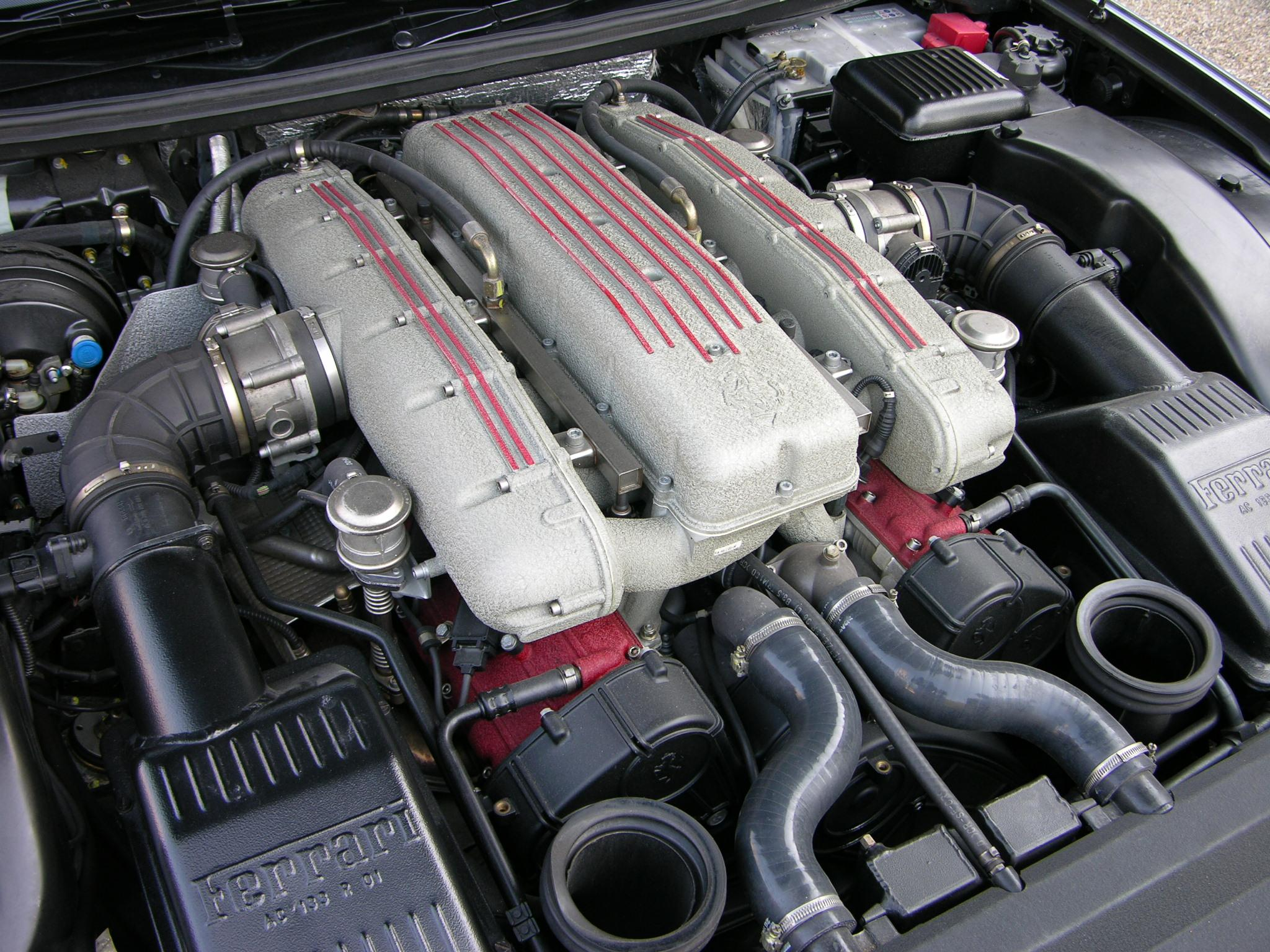
The F133E V12 engine

Sources:

- Configuration: Longitudinally-mounted Front-engine, rear-wheel-drive layout 65° V12
- Aspiration: naturally aspirated
- Fuel feed: Bosch Motronic M 5.2 fuel injection
- Displacement: 5,748 cc (5.7 L; 350.8 cu in)
- Bore X stroke: 89 mm × 77 mm (3.50 in × 3.03 in)
- Valvetrain: DOHC per bank, 4 valves per cylinder
- Lubrication: dry sump
- Maximum power: 515 PS (379 kW; 508 hp) at 7,250 rpm
- Maximum torque: 588 N⋅m (434 lb⋅ft) at 5,250 rpm

=== Performance ===
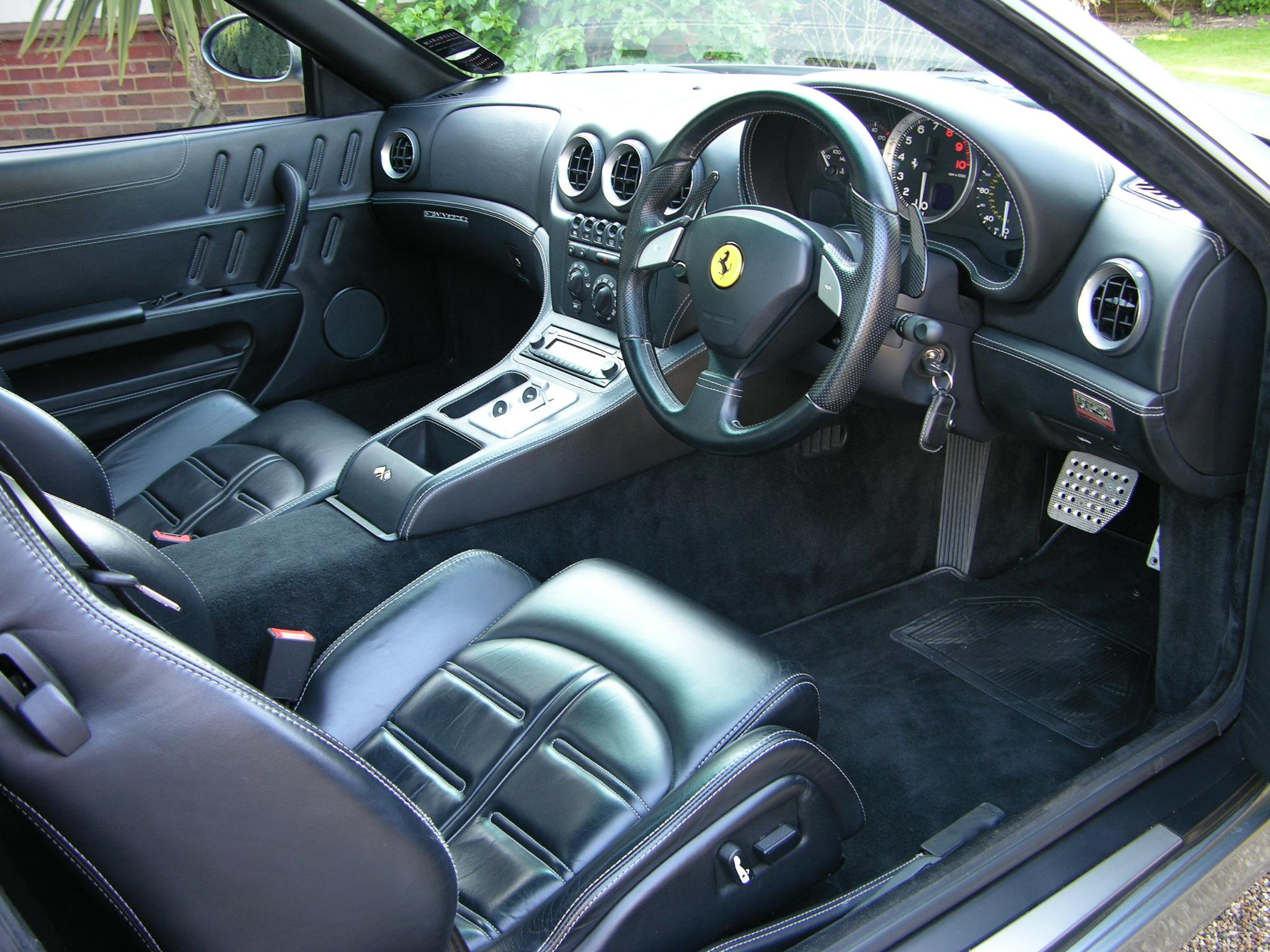
Interior with F1 paddleshift gearbox

- Maximum speed: 325 km/h (202 mph)
- 0 to 100 km/h (62 mph): 4.2 seconds
- 0–400 m: 12.25 seconds
- 0-1,000 m: 21.9 seconds

All figures for F1 gearbox (+0.05 second for the manual gearbox)

=== Dimensions ===
- Front track: 1,632 mm (64.3 in)
- Rear track: 1,586 mm (62.4 in)
- Fuel capacity: 105 L (27.7 US gal)

=== Tyres ===
- Front: 8.5"X18 Wheels. 255/40 ZR18 P-ZERO ROSSOd
- Rear: 10"X18 Wheels. 295/35 R18 P-ZERO ROSSO

== Handling GTC package - HGTC ==
The HGTC package included Ferrari's fourth Carbon fibre-reinforced Silicon Carbide (C/SiC) composite ceramic brake system, made by Brembo (the first 3 being featured on the Challenge Stradale, F430 and Enzo) as well as a more performance-tuned suspension system, with stiffer springs, revised dampers and a substantially stiffer rear anti-roll bar - together with a lowered ride height. The car was fitted with a titanium low-restriction exhaust system, and unique for the HGTC 19 inch 3 piece speedline wheels. The new brakes were based on the company's Formula One technology. The massive ceramic discs measuring 15.7 inches (398 mm) with six-piston calipers at the front and discs measuring 14.2 inches (360 mm) with four-piston calipers at the rear. The car also received a revised F1 gearbox calibration for faster gear changes. Chassis and steering revisions including a higher-ratio steering rack to give the car a more immediate race inspired response.

The HGTC package improved on the 575M while preserving its identity as a front-engined naturally aspirated V12 grand tourer. Inspired by Ferrari’s competition program and the 575 GTC race car, it was advertised as a racing-quality performance upgrade. Priced at approximately £16,450 (€22,620) when new the HGTC was a significant investment compared with the more much common Fiorano Handling Package at around £2,215 (€2900). Of approximately 2,056 Ferrari 575M Maranellos produced just 98 received the factory HGTC package. Only eight were equipped with the six-speed gated manual gearbox and just six HGTC (RHD) cars were delivered to the UK.

In hindsight the HGTC can be seen as a precursor to Ferrari’s later Speciale and GTO models including the 458 Speciale and 599 GTO: more focused factory-developed versions of existing production cars with a stronger connection to motorsport. Its combination of engineering substance and extreme rarity makes it a particularly significant chapter in Ferrari’s evolution.

== Superamerica ==
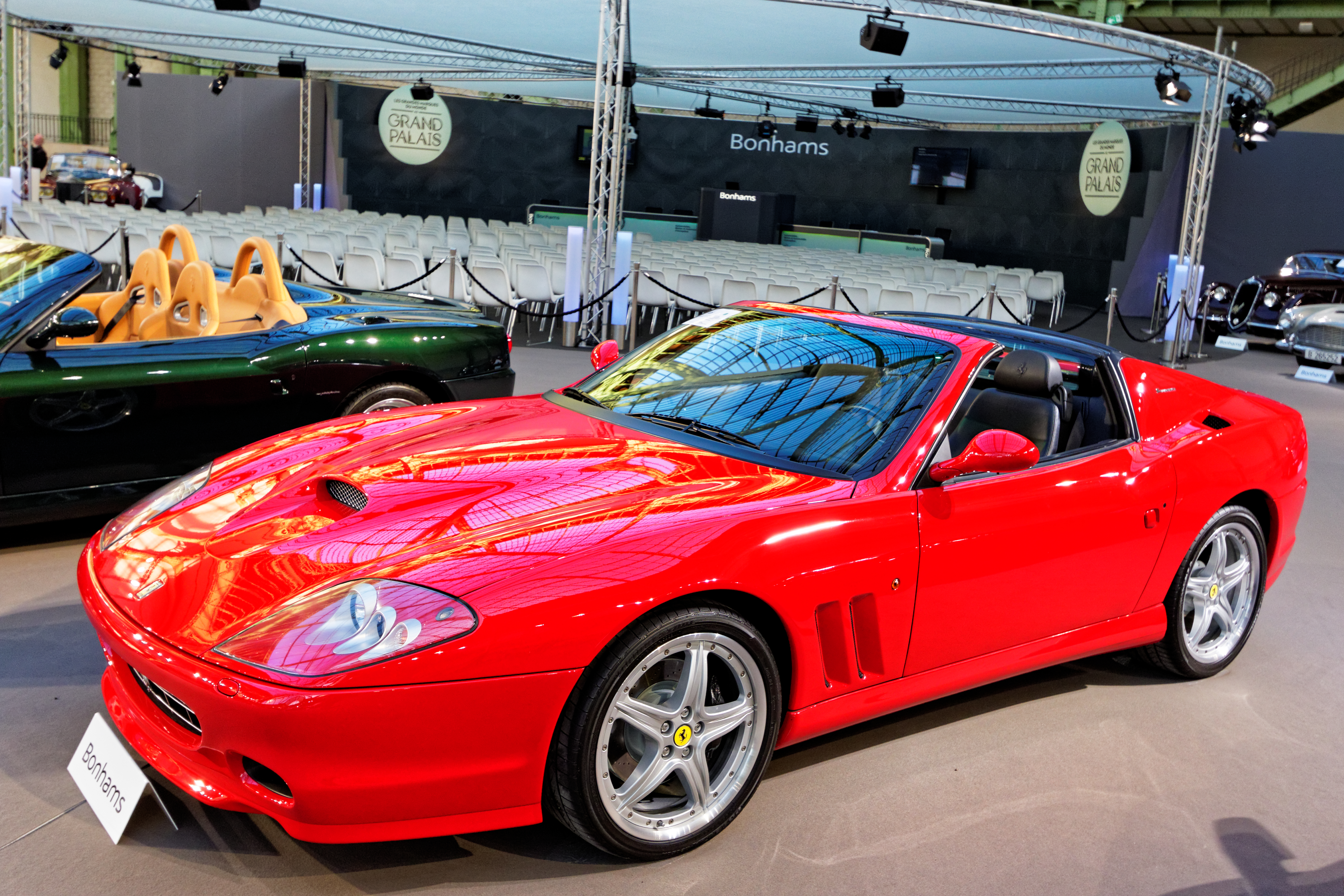
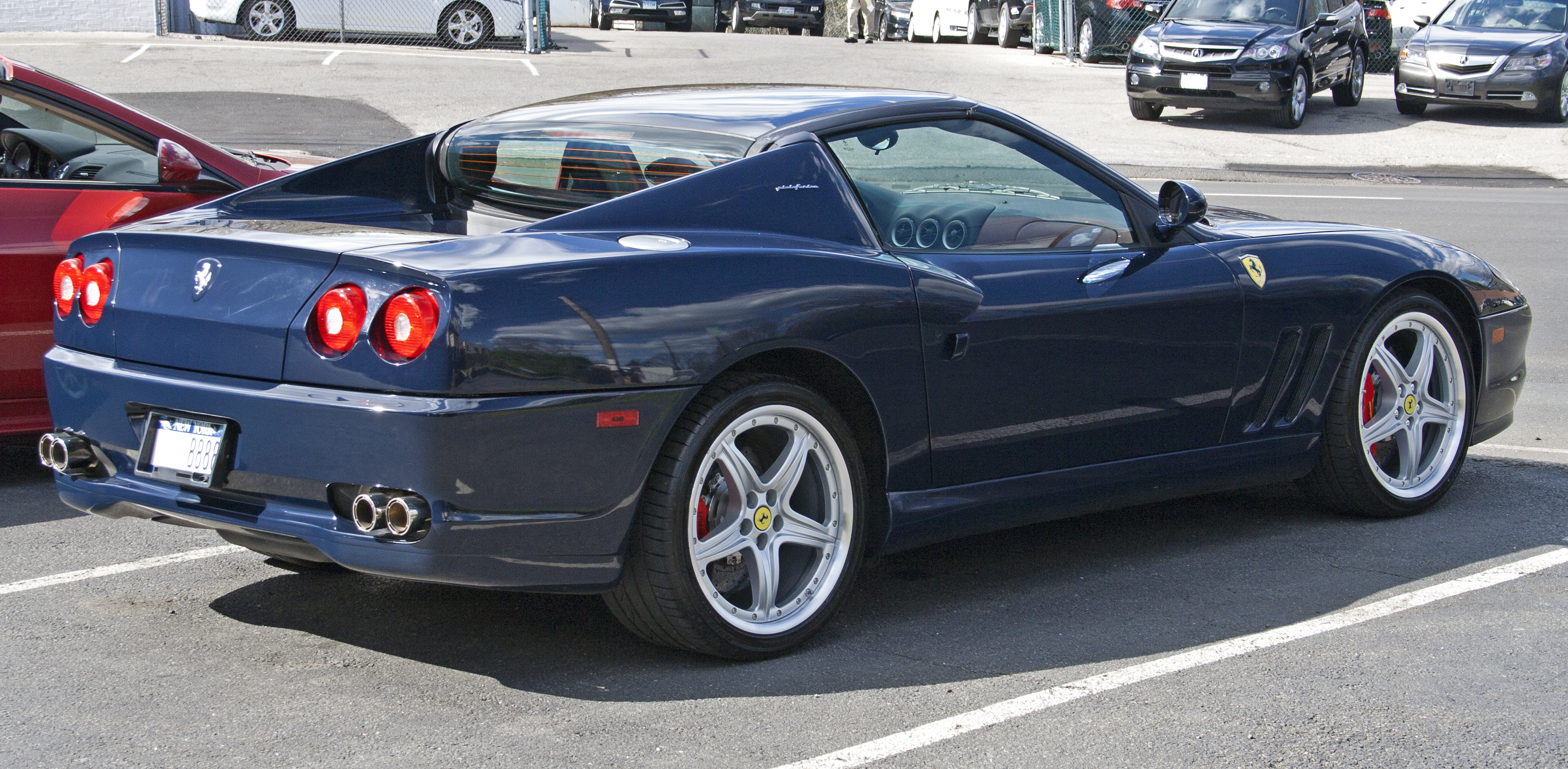
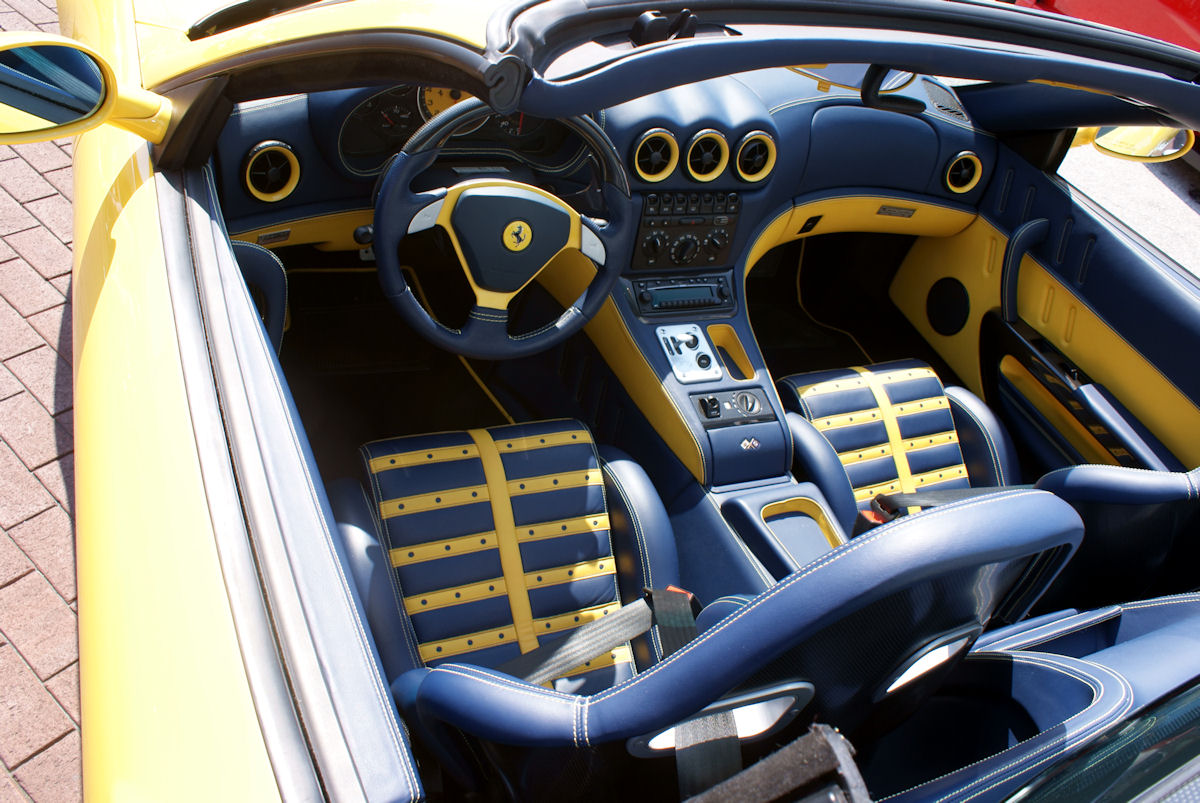
Ferrari Superamerica

Introduced in 2005, the Ferrari Superamerica is a convertible version of the 575M Maranello; it featured an electrochromic glass panel roof which rotated 180° at the rear to lie flat over the boot taking 60 seconds for operation. Patented as Revocromico, the roof incorporates a carbon-fiber structure that is hinged on the single axis with a luggage compartment lid, allowing access to the latter even with an open roof. The roof was manufactured in collaboration with French glass specialist Saint Gobain. With the roof open, the rear window, apart from holding the third stoplight, also acts as a wind deflector. This roof design was previously used on a 2000 Alfa Romeo Vola, designed by Leonardo Fioravanti. The Superamerica used the higher-output tune of the V12 engine used on the 575M, codenamed the F133 G, rated at 540 PS (397 kW; 533 hp) and Ferrari marketed it as the world's fastest convertible car, with a top speed of 320 km/h (199 mph). The GTC handling package was optional.

Total production amounted to 559 units; this number followed Enzo Ferrari's philosophy that there should always be one fewer car available than what the market demanded; only 43 of those had a manual gearbox.

== 575 GTZ ==
A special 575M was built by Zagato for Japanese Ferrari collector Yoshiyuki Hayashi, and announced at the 2006 Geneva Motor Show. Designed to recall the 250 GT Berlinetta Zagato and commemorate the 50th anniversary of the 250 range, the GTZ was officially endorsed by Ferrari and includes Zagato's trademark double-bubble roofline, the custom coachbuilt bodywork recalling the styling of the Ferrari models of the 1960s and two-tone paint scheme. Six cars were built in total, that were later supplemented by three open variants based on an earlier 550 model. The mechanical components were unchanged.

| VIN | Assembly date | Assembly number | Specification | Exterior color | Interior color | Origin | Notes |
|---|---|---|---|---|---|---|---|
| ZFFBT55B000127928 | 2002 | 45210 | EU | Dark grey metallic with light grey metallic top | Cream | Italy | Offered for sale in May 2014 at RM Sotheby's Monaco auction. |
| ZFFBV55AX50140719 | January 2005 | 58239 | US | Dark blue with white top | Brown | Florida, USA | Offered for sale in August 2020 at RM Sotheby's Monterey auction. |
| ZFFBV55A740136920 | 2006 | ? | US | Dark grey metallic top and bottom | Red (Bordeaux) | Arizona, USA | |
| ZFFBT55B000130838 | ? | ? | EU | White (Bianco Fuji) with dark brown top | Black | Italy | |
| ZFFBV55A420127394 | 2002 | 44689 | US | Dark grey metallic with light grey metallic top | Brown | Japan | Built for Yoshiyuki Hayashi |
| ZFFBT55J000134936 | October 2003 | 52403 | JP | Black top and bottom | Green | Japan | Built for Yoshiyuki Hayashi. Offered for sale in 2026 by Motorenn in Los Angeles, CA. |

== Motorsports ==
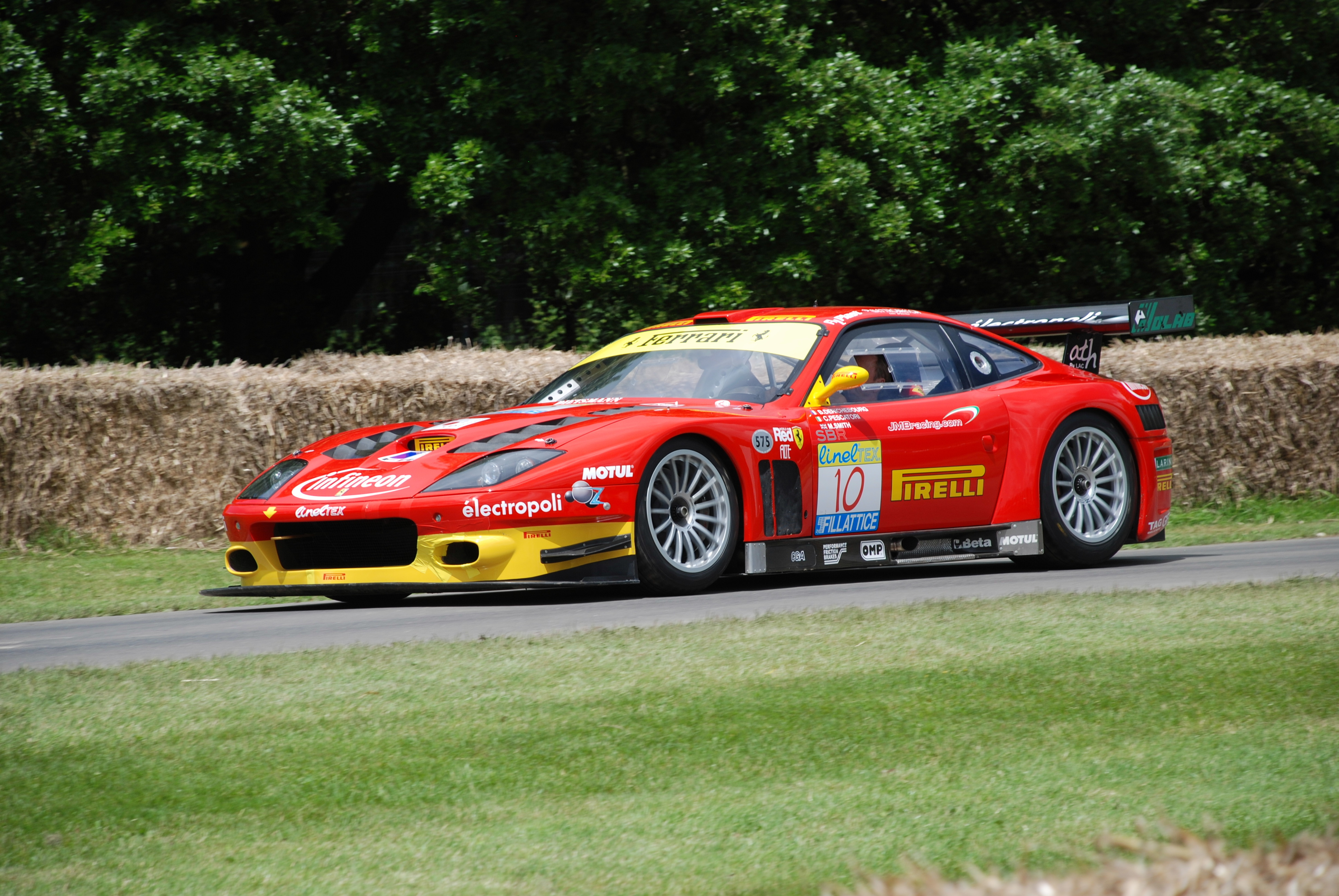
Ferrari 575 GTC

In 2003, Ferrari announced the sale of several 575M-based racing cars, known as the 575 GTC (not to be confused with the 575M GTC Handling Package). Following the success of Prodrive built 550 based racing cars, Ferrari wished to offer their own racing car to customers. Introduced at the 2003 Frankfurt Motor Show, the 575 GTC was a modified 575M specially developed for the FIA GT Championship in collaboration with N Technology. Changes to the car included additional cooling vents on the front in order to cool the larger 6.0-liter V12 engine, an integrated roll-cage, a wider rear track, carbon-fiber body panels, a large fixed rear wing with a Gurney flap, a front splitter, and rear diffuser, a 6-speed Xtrac sequential manual transmission and the use of carbon-fiber racing seats and Lexan windows. The modifications allowed the car to achieve the dry weight of 1,148 kg (2,530 lb). The GTC shared the same tubular steel structure as the 575M.

The modified engine was shared with the 550 GTS and generated a power output of 608 PS (447 kW; 600 hp) at 6,000 rpm and 730 N⋅m (538 lb⋅ft) of torque at 5,200 rpm. The increase in power was achieved by installing new camshafts and using a Magneti Marelli fuel injection system in place of the Bosch Motronic unit. A top speed of 335 km/h (208 mph) was possible albeit modifications in the aerodynamic components.

Used primarily in the FIA GT Championship, the 575 GTC managed to take a single win in its first season, the Estoril 2003 race, followed by another lone win in 2004. Unfortunately the 575 GTC was not as capable as the Prodrive-built 550 GTS, and would fall from use by the end of 2005.

The 575 GTC was used as a testbed in the development of the Ferrari XX program.

=== Racing results ===
(key)

==== European Le Mans Series ====
| Year | Entrants | No. | 1 | 2 | 3 | 4 | 5 | 6 |
| 2004 | — | | MNZ (Italy) | LMS (France) | NÜR (Germany) | SIL^{†} (United Kingdom) | SPA (Belgium) | |
|---|---|---|---|---|---|---|---|---|
| 2004 | (Netherlands) Barron Connor Racing | 61 | 2 | Ret | 4 | 4 | 4 | |
| 2004 | (Netherlands) Barron Connor Racing | 62 | Ret | Ret | 5 | 2 | 3 | |
| 2005 | — | | SPA (Belgium) | LMS (France) | MNZ (Italy) | SIL (United Kingdom) | NÜR (Germany) | IST (Turkey) |
| 2005 | (France) JMB Racing | 68 | Ret | Ret | 5 | Ret | Ret | 5 |

==== FIA GT Championship ====
| Year | Entrants | No. | 1 | 2 | 3 | 4 | 5 | 6 | 7 | 8 | 9 | 10 | 11 | 12 | 13 |
| 2003 | — | | BAR (Spain) | MAG (France) | PER (Italy) | BRN (Czech Republic) | DON (United Kingdom) | SPA (Belgium) | | | AND (Sweden) | OSC (Germany) | EST (Portugal) | MON (Italy) | |
| 2003 | — | | BAR (Spain) | MAG (France) | PER (Italy) | BRN (Czech Republic) | DON (United Kingdom) | 6H | 12H | 24H | AND (Sweden) | OSC (Germany) | EST (Portugal) | MON (Italy) | |
|---|---|---|---|---|---|---|---|---|---|---|---|---|---|---|---|
| 2003 | (France) JMB Racing | 9 | | | | | | | | | | | 1 | 4 | |
| 2003 | (France) JMB Racing | 10 | | | | | | | | | | | Ret | 5 | |
| 2004 | — | | MON (Italy) | VAL (Spain) | MAG (France) | HOC (Germany) | BRN (Czech Republic) | DON (United Kingdom) | SPA (Belgium) | | | IMO (Italy) | OSC (Germany) | DUB (United Arab Emirates) | ZHU (China) |
| 2004 | — | | MON (Italy) | VAL (Spain) | MAG (France) | HOC (Germany) | BRN (Czech Republic) | DON (United Kingdom) | 6H | 12H | 24H | IMO (Italy) | OSC (Germany) | DUB (United Arab Emirates) | ZHU (China) |
| 2004 | (Italy) GPC Giesse Squadra Corse | 11 | 3 | Ret | 6 | 6 | 4 | 3 | 1 | 2 | 2 | 5 | 7 | 5 | 8 |
| 2004 | (Italy) GPC Giesse Squadra Corse | 13 | 4 | Ret | 13 | 5 | Ret | 6 | 10 | 9 | 6 | 6 | Ret | 9 | 6 |
| 2004 | (Monaco) JMB Racing | 17 | Ret | 4 | 2 | 11 | 2 | 1 | 8 | 5 | 4 | 7 | 3 | Ret | 5 |
| 2004 | (Monaco) JMB Racing | 18 | 7 | 7 | Ret | 9 | 8 | 10 | 6 | 10 | NC | 11 | 8 | 13 | 9 |
| 2004 | (Monaco) JMB Racing | 19 | Ret | 8 | 11 | 10 | 14 | 12 | | | | 9 | 11 | 8 | 11 |
| 2005 | — | | MON (Italy) | MAG (France) | SIL (United Kingdom) | IMO (Italy) | BRN (Czech Republic) | SPA (Belgium) | | | OSC (Germany) | IST (Turkey) | ZHU (China) | DUB (United Arab Emirates) | BHR (Bahrain) |
| 2005 | — | | MON (Italy) | MAG (France) | SIL (United Kingdom) | IMO (Italy) | BRN (Czech Republic) | 6H | 12H | 24H | OSC (Germany) | IST (Turkey) | ZHU (China) | DUB (United Arab Emirates) | BHR (Bahrain) |
| 2005 | (Italy) GPC Sport | 2 | Ret | 9 | 5 | Ret | Ret | Ret | Ret | Ret | 6 | 4 | 5 | 6 | 12 |
| 2005 | (Italy) GPC Sport | 3 | 13 | | Ret | 6 | 3 | 9 | 8 | 7 | 12 | | | Ret | 6 |
| 2005 | (Czech Republic) Rock Media Motors | 24 | | | | | 9 | | | | | | | | |
