= JMB Racing =

Sports car racing team from Monaco

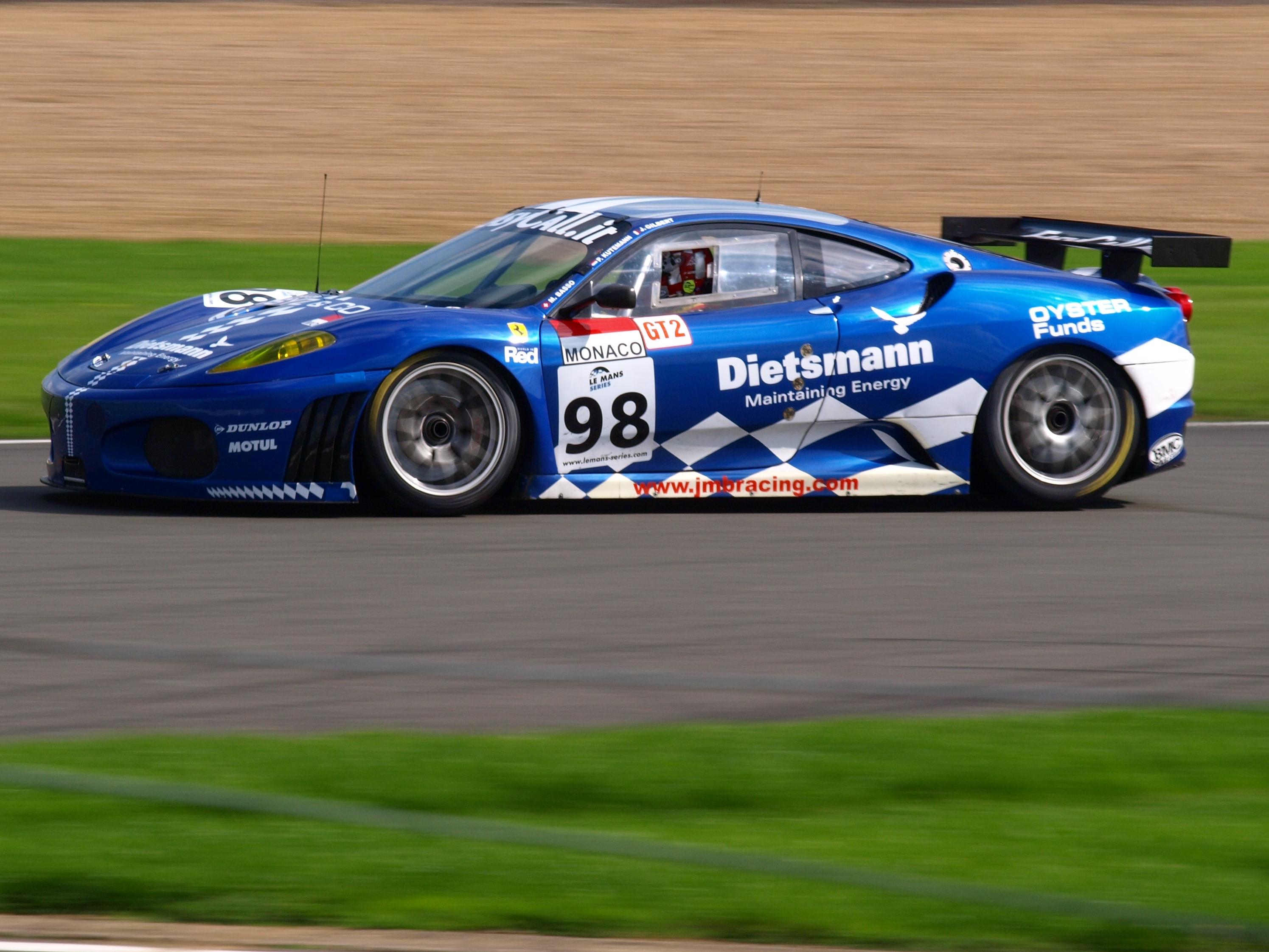
A JMB Racing Ferrari F430 GT2 which competed in the Le Mans Series

JMB Racing is a racing team from Monaco that competes in sports car racing. It was founded in Nice, France, in 1995 as JB Racing by Jean-Michel Bouresche and Jean-Pierre Jabouille. It was renamed JMB (Bouresche's initials) in 2000 after Jabouille left the partnership. JMB relocated its headquarters to Monaco in 2004, racing with a Monegasque license since then.

== History ==
The team first raced in the Andros Trophy and the Porsche Pirelli Supercup in the 1995 season, winning the 2 litre class in the first with Jean-Pierre Malcher and Jacques Laffite, and taking the title in the second with Malcher, repeating the win the following year with Emmanuel Collard.

For 1997, Bouresche and Jabouille went international, purchasing a Porsche 911 GT1 to race in the brand new FIA GT Championship, with Emmanuel Collard and Jürgen von Gartzen, also taking part in Le Mans. The team was backed by the primary sponsor Marlboro.

The increased presence of factory teams drove JB Racing away from the FIA GT Championship, so instead the team purchased two Ferrari 333 SPs to race in the International Sports Racing Series from 1998, dropping Marlboro as a sponsor in place of Italian manufacturing firm Giesse. The French team stayed in this sports-prototype championship for three years, winning the drivers titles with Collard and Vincenzo Sospiri in 1998 and 1999 and David Terrien and Christian Pescatori in 2000, in addition to taking the teams titles for three years in a row. The team ran one Ferrari in the 24 Hours of Le Mans in 1998 and 1999.

In 2000 JB, now called JMB, also made a return to GT racing with the new Ferrari 360 Modena as the official Ferrari demonstrator, taking second place overall in the 6 Hours of Vallelunga. In 2001 they switched full-time to GTs, winning the N-GT class in the FIA GT Championship, once more with Terrien and Pescatori, who also won the title in 2002. On both occasions, the team title was also retained. JMB also ran two cars in the 24 Hours of Le Mans, and Bouresche created the JMB Racing USA operation to run cars in the international American races, such as the Daytona 24 Hours and Sebring 12 Hours.

In 2003, in addition to taking second place in the N-GT category with Andrea Bertolini and Fabrizio De Simone, JMB Racing graduated to the main GT category with a Ferrari 550 Maranello. However, the French team used the car developed by N.Technology, more troublesome than the Prodrive version, and drivers Pescatori and Boris Derichebourg were only competitive after upgrading to the 575 GTC.

In 2004, JMB Racing changed its address to Monaco and began racing under the Monegasque flag. The team however retained their workshops in Nice. The team scored third place in the FIA GT Championship with two 575 GTCs, in spite of a lack of consistency due to several drivers changes, but still won the Donington race with Karl Wendlinger and Jaime Melo. JMB also took the Drivers title in the Le Mans Endurance Series with Roman Rusinov in a 360 Modena and was third in the Italian GT Championship, with the old 550 Maranello.

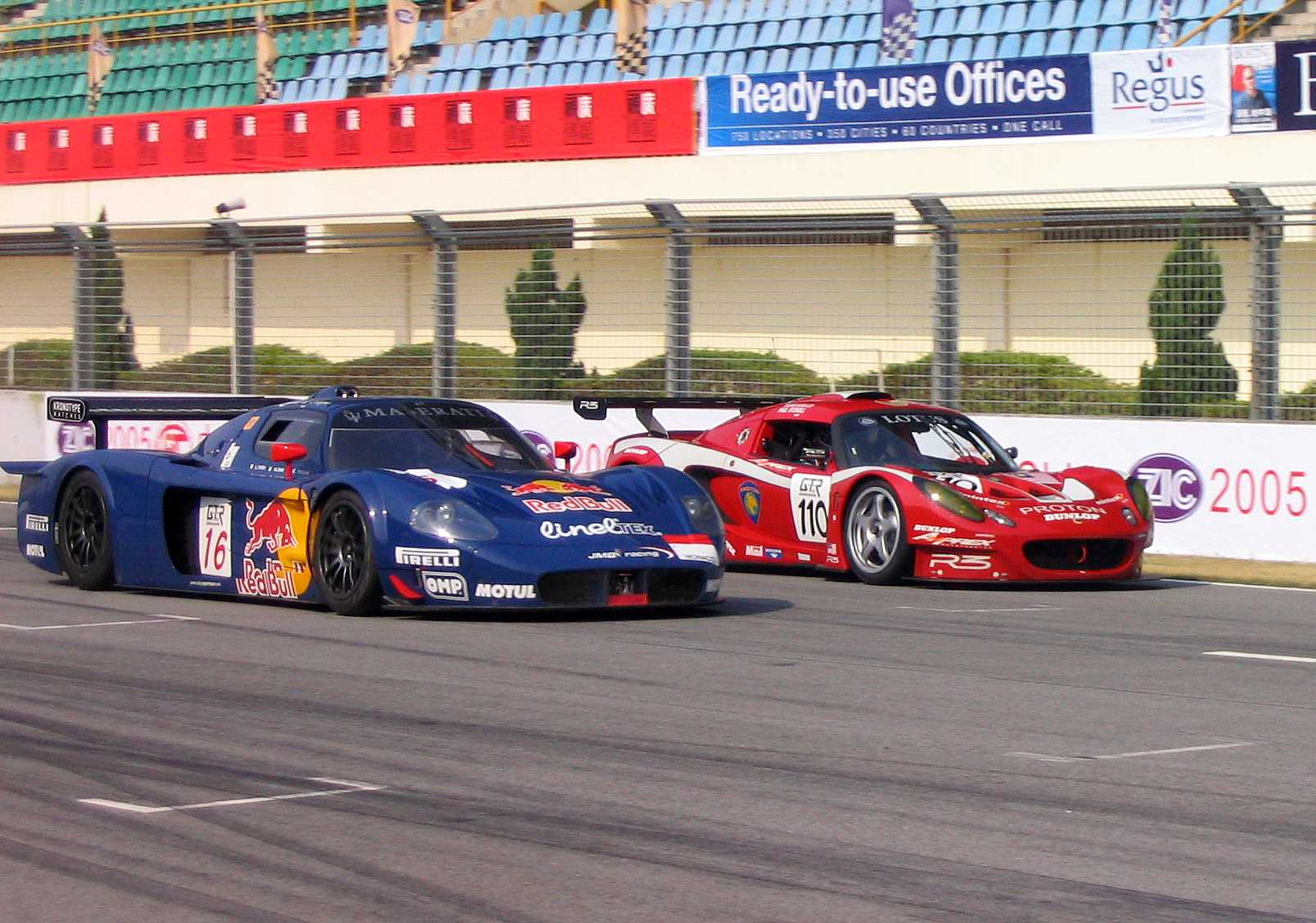
A JMB Racing Maserati MC12 and an Amprez Motorsports Lotus Exige at the Zhuhai round of the 2005 FIA GT Championship

JMB was one of the first teams in the FIA GT to race the brand new Maserati MC12 in 2005. Wendlinger and Bertolini won at Magny-Cours but missed the win at the Spa 24 Hours by two laps, taking third place at the end of the year for the driver's championship, with the team reaching second place. The 575 was also used in the LMES as well as at Le Mans. In 2006, JMB went back to the GT2 class with the new Ferrari 430, but in spite of a win in Silverstone, were outclassed by rivals Scuderia Ecosse as well as the Porsche teams and managed only fourth place in the team's championship at the end. JMB also entered three cars in the new FIA GT3 European Championship.

In 2007, JMB divided its time between the FIA GT, European GT3 and the Le Mans Series. The highlight of the year was Ben Aucott's win of the Citation Cup, a series within the FIA GT for gentleman drivers. The team also won one race in the European GT3 series and took second and third in the final round of the LMS at Interlagos.

== Racing record ==
=== 24 Hours of Le Mans results ===
Year	Entrant	No.	Car	Drivers	Class	Laps	Pos.	Class Pos.
1997	(France) JB Racing	29	Porsche 911 GT1	(France) Alain Ferté (Germany) Jürgen von Gartzen (France) Olivier Thévenin	LMGT1	236	DNF	DNF
1998	(France) JB Racing	5	Ferrari 333 SP-98	(France) Jean-Christophe Boullion (France) Jérôme Policand (Italy) Vincenzo Sospiri	LMP1	187	DNF	DNF
1999	(France) JB Racing	29	Ferrari 333 SP	(Italy) Mauro Baldi (Italy) Christian Pescatori (France) Jérôme Policand	LMP900	71	DNF	DNF
2002	(France) JMB Racing	70	Ferrari 360 Modena GT	(United Kingdom) Sam Hancock (United Kingdom) Martin Short (United States) Cort Wagner	LMGT	16	DNF	DNF
2002	(France) JMB Racing	71	Ferrari 360 Modena GT	(United States) Steve Earle (United States) Chris MacAllister (United States) Gary Schultheis	LMGT	85	DNF	DNF
2003	(France) JMB Racing	70	Ferrari 360 Modena GT	(Italy) Fabio Babini (Italy) Fabrizio De Simone (France) David Terrien	LMGT	273	25th	7th
2004	(France) JMB Racing	70	Ferrari 360 Modena GTC	(France) Stéphane Daoudi (France) Jean-René de Fournoux (Brazil) Jaime Melo	LMGT	133	DNF	DNF
2005	(Monaco) JMB Racing	69	Ferrari 575 GTC	(France) Stéphane Daoudi (France) Jean-René de Fournoux (United States) Jim Matthews	LMGT1	84	DNF	DNF
2008	(Monaco) JMB Racing (United Kingdom) Aucott Racing	99	Ferrari F430 GT2	(United Kingdom) Ben Aucott (France) Stéphane Daoudi (France) Alain Ferté	LMGT2	312	25th	4th
2009	(Monaco) JMB Racing	99	Ferrari F430 GT2	(France) Christophe Bouchut (France) Yvan Lebon (France) Manuel Rodrigues	LMGT2	304	29th	8th
2011	(Monaco) JMB Racing	83	Ferrari F430 GTE	(France) Nicolas Marroc (France) Jean-Marc Menahem (France) Manuel Rodrigues	LMGTE Am	272	27th	4th
2012	(Monaco) JMB Racing	83	Ferrari 458 Italia GT2	(France) Alain Ferté (France) Philippe Illiano (Portugal) Manuel Rodrigues	LMGTE Am	292	32nd	7th
