= Chrysler Viper GTS-R =

Racing variant of the Dodge Viper

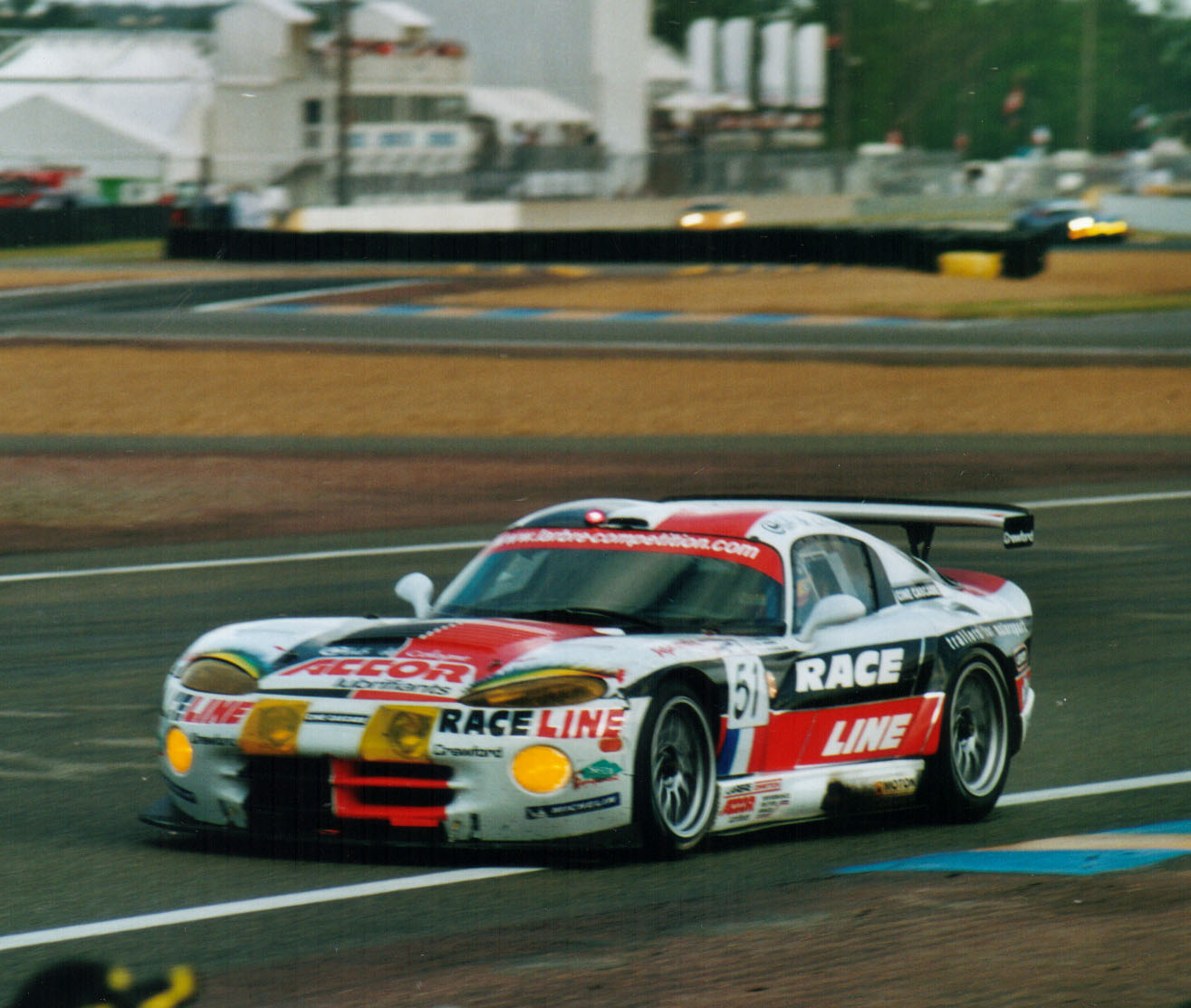
- Category: GT2
- Designer: Bob Lutz
- Production: 1996-2005
- Successor: Dodge Viper Competition Coupe GT3

Technical specifications
- Chassis: Unitary steel spaceframe
- Suspension (front): Double wishbones, coil springs, and adjustable dampers, with carbon-fiber anti-roll bars
- Suspension (rear): Double wishbones, coil springs, and adjustable dampers, with steel anti-roll bars
- Length: 4,548 mm (179.1 in)
- Width: 1,924 mm (75.7 in)
- Height: 1,146 mm (45.1 in)
- Axle track: 1,658 mm (65.3 in) (front); 1,688 mm (66.5 in) (rear)
- Wheelbase: 2,243 mm (88.3 in)
- Engine: Chrysler EWB 8.0 L (490 cu in) (7,998 cc) OHV V10 naturally-aspirated, front-engined, rear-wheel drive Viper-derived Chrysler LA 6.2 L (380 cu in) OHV V8 naturally-aspirated, front-engined, rear-wheel drive (1998-2002 #1 Zakspeed Racing Viper GTS-R only)
- Transmission: BorgWarner T56 or TREMEC 6-speed manual
- Power: 600–770 hp (450–570 kW); 535–729 lb⋅ft (725–988 N⋅m) torque
- Weight: 1,150 kg (2,540 lb)
- Tires: Michelin; Pirelli (privateer teams); Yokohama (Team Taisan)

Competition history
- Notable entrants: (France) Larbre Compétition (France) Paul Belmondo Racing (France) Viper Team Oreca (United Kingdom) Hayles Racing (United Kingdom) Orion Motorsport (United States) Canaska-Southwind (United States) Viperacing (Japan) Team Taisan (Germany) Zakspeed Racing
- Notable drivers: (France) Alain Prost (France) Paul Belmondo (United Kingdom) Kurt Luby (United Kingdom) Richard Dean (Monaco) Olivier Beretta
- Debut: 1996 24 Hours of Daytona
- First win: 1998 British GT Championship Silverstone
- Last win: 2006 FFSA GT Magny-Cours
- Last event: 2008 Monza 2 Hours
Races	Wins	Podiums	Poles	F/Laps
445	162	213	117	N/A
- Constructors' Championships: 23
- Drivers' Championships: 24

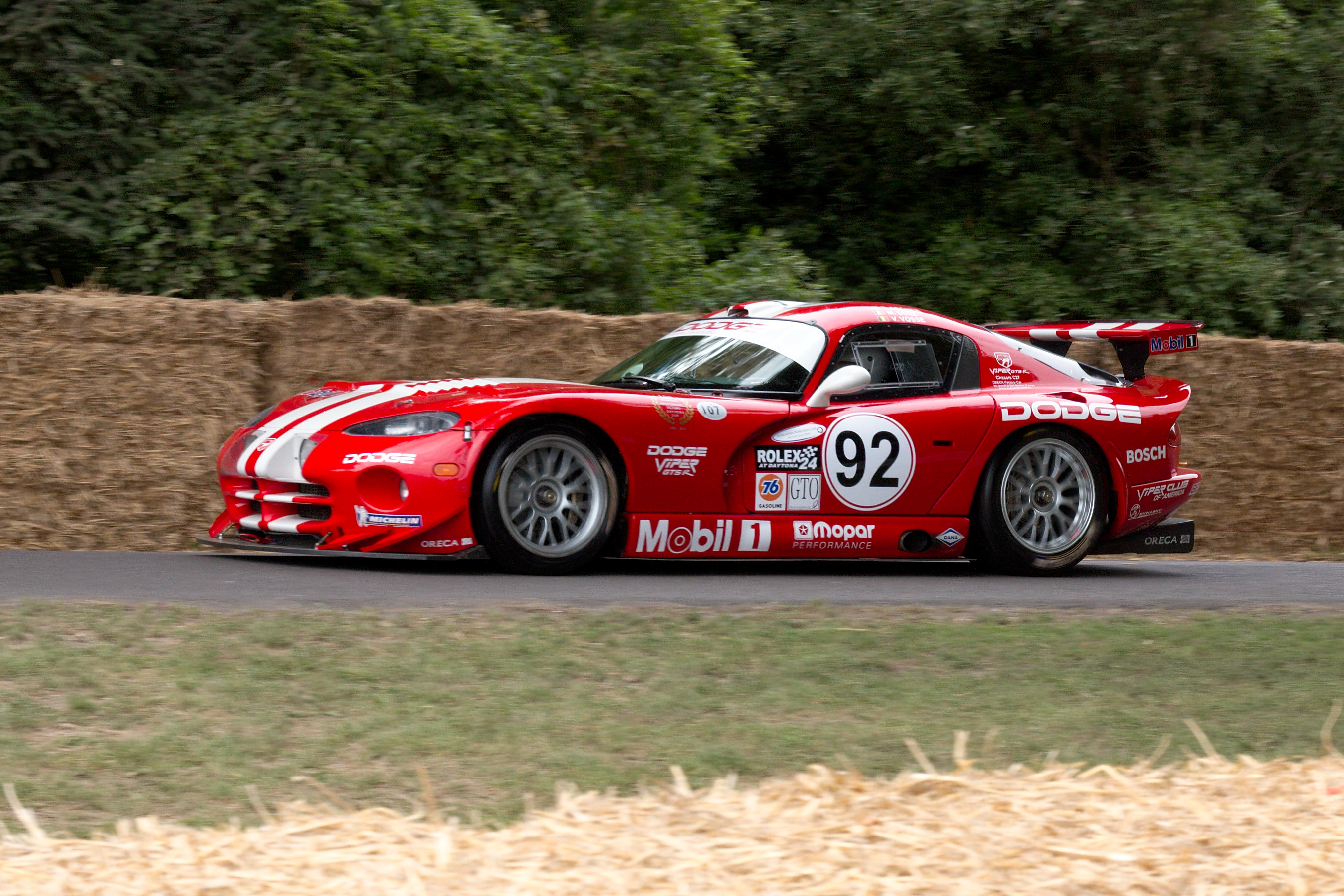
2000 Team Oreca #92 Chrysler Viper GTS-R at Goodwood in 2010

The Chrysler Viper GTS-R (also known as the Dodge Viper GTS-R when raced in North America) was a successful racing variant of the Dodge Viper developed in conjunction with Chrysler of North America, Oreca of France and Reynard Motorsport of the United Kingdom. Officially unveiled at the 1995 Pebble Beach Concours, it has won numerous championships and famous events in its history.

== Development ==
In the early 1990s, first-generation Dodge Viper RT/10s had been modified by racing teams for use in GT racing in North America and Europe without much success. Although its V10 engine was powerful, the car was not adapted to racing and teams lacked the funding to build a car that could compete with factory efforts. One key issue was that the Viper was a roadster, therefore lacking the rigidity that a coupe bodystyle would have. However, following the sales success of the first generation Viper, Dodge began redesigning the car in 1995, upgrading the roadster while at the same time adding a new coupe, known as the Viper GTS.

Although the first generation Vipers had sold well, Dodge wished to showcase the potential capabilities of the new car, mostly in the realm of handling. At the same time, Dodge also hoped to increase sales in Europe where importation of the Viper had struggled. Dodge's parent, Chrysler, therefore approved the development of a racing program centering on the Viper GTS which was still in development at the time. This co-development would allow for elements of the racing car to be adapted to the road car, and vice versa, for each car's mutual improvement.

Chrysler believed that in order to adapt their car not only for North American but also European circuits, they would require outside assistance. An agreement was made with the French racing and engineering firm Oreca, who had many years of experience in sports car racing as well as assistance in the Mazda 787B's win in the 1991 24 Hours of Le Mans. Oreca would construct and maintain the racing cars in their shops, as well as run Chrysler's official factory teams in Europe. For North America, Chrysler would recruit the Canaska / Southwind Team to operate the factory effort.

Although Oreca would construct the cars, key elements would come from British engineering firm Reynard Motorsport. This would mainly consist of the construction of the car's basic chassis and other integral parts before they were shipped to Oreca for assembly. As for the Viper's engine, it was ideally suited for competition at the time due to limits of 8000 cc being just beyond the Viper's 7998.5 cc. Modifications were therefore light for the 356-T6 V10, with concentration on redesigned intakes for horsepower and reinforcements for endurance.

In terms of design much of the bodywork of the Viper GTS was retained on the race car. Mandatory elements such as a rear wing, rear diffuser and front splitter were added for aerodynamics, while initial cars had their fog lights covered over before being put back for increased visibility at night. To aid in lighting, optional lights were able to be placed in square notches above the grille. The exhaust would also be routed out the side of the car, just under the doors, about halfway between the front and rear wheel wells. Side exhausts had been a feature of the first generation American-market RT/10s, but were no longer used on the GTS. Vents were also added to the hood for cooling the engine, while intakes were placed on the roof and rear fenders.

In total, 57 Viper GTS-Rs would be built. After the production of an initial five prototypes for testing and early usage by Oreca and Canaska / Southwind, 52 more cars would be built. Oreca built a total of 18 chassis. Although some would be used by the factory teams, most would be sold directly to customers for use in whatever series would allow them. Viper GTS-Rs continued to be built into 2005, after which Oreca concentrated on maintaining and supporting the existing Viper GTS-R fleet.

=== Naming ===
Although the production cars have mostly been known as Dodge Vipers, the Dodge brand did not sell the Viper in Europe. Because the new cars, named GTS-R, were built in Europe, they were mostly known as Chrysler Viper GTS-R. However, cars racing in North America usually ran under the Dodge banner, making them Dodge Viper GTS-Rs. This naming difference therefore depends on location and region. The cars themselves actually carried no badging for either Chrysler or Dodge, with only the Viper GTS-R name appearing on the side of the bonnet.

=== GT2 Champion Edition ===
With the FIA GT2 Team and Driver championship wins in October 1997, Team Viper set forth with the creation of a unique Viper called the GT2 Champion Edition. There would be 100 cars offered through the top Dodge Viper dealers, featuring the same white with blue stripes paint scheme as the race cars, as well as a large rear wing, front dive planes and splitter, side sills, BBS rims and GTS-R badging. The GT2 also features an Oreca 5-point racing harness, and the center dash plaque with the vehicle's unique production number.

== Racing history ==
Debuting in 1996, two racing teams separately developed the Chrysler Viper GTS-R coupe for competition. Canaska Southwind started in the North American IMSA GT Championship GTS-1 class at the 1996 24 Hours of Daytona, managing to finish in 29th place. However, the team would improve with a twelfth-place finish at the 12 Hours of Sebring. Viper Team Oreca would also run a limited schedule beginning with the 24 Hours of Le Mans.

Both teams appeared at the Le Mans with two entries each. Three of those four cars managed to finish with Canaska Southwind earning the best result in tenth place. The two teams returned to their respective series afterwards. Viper Team Oreca concluded the year with three races in the BPR Global GT Series earning eighth place at Brands Hatch, ninth at Spa, and sixth at Nogaro. Canaska Southwind concluded the season by finishing second in class at Mosport and sixth overall.

The Canaska Southwind team would end their involvement in the Viper program in 1997. This meant Oreca would make the only appearance for a Viper in IMSA GT by submitting a lone entry at the Rolex 24 at Daytona, finishing in 12th place. After Daytona, the team returned to Europe to concentrate on the new FIA GT Championship which had replaced the BPR series. The team would switch to the less powerful GT2 class due to the strength of the Porsche and Mercedes-Benz teams which were entering GT1, while at the same time being joined by the customer Chamberlain Engineering team. Oreca began the season strong with a 1-2 finish in their class ahead of the Roock Racing Porsches, and would go on to take six more victories in the eleven race season and winning the GT2 championship. The team also returned to Le Mans with three cars, although they would only finish in 14th place, fifth in their class. Another customer Viper would also appear in the All Japan Grand Touring Car Championship for Team Taisan, making two appearances with a best finish of eighth.

The Oreca team would strengthen their dominance in FIA GT in 1998, as the team managed to win all but one event in the ten race schedule. Oreca would also take their first class victory at Le Mans with an eleventh place overall finish. Chamberlain continued as a privateer in FIA GT earning several points, as well as earning a 14th-place finish at Daytona. Meanwhile, the Orion Motorsport would purchase a Viper GTS-R and go on to score six class wins in the British GT Championship, including an overall race win at Silverstone and earning Kurt Luby and Richard Dean the drivers' championship.

For 1999, Oreca's efforts were expanded further, as the team now operated in two championships: A two-car team in the new American Le Mans Series and the existing two car team already competing in FIA GT. FIA GT saw the Vipers once again sweep the series with nine wins for Oreca, and a lone win for the Paul Belmondo Viper. Chamberlain improved their team to finish second in the championship, while GLPK Carsport would be the fourth Viper squad to compete. A similar story occurred in the ALMS, with Oreca winning six races and taking that championship as well. Oreca would also earn their second straight win at Le Mans, with various Vipers finishing in the top six positions in their class. The FFSA GT Championship would see the appearance of Belmondo's Vipers, earning two victories over the season, and the 24 Hours Nürburgring would see Zakspeed claiming overall victory.

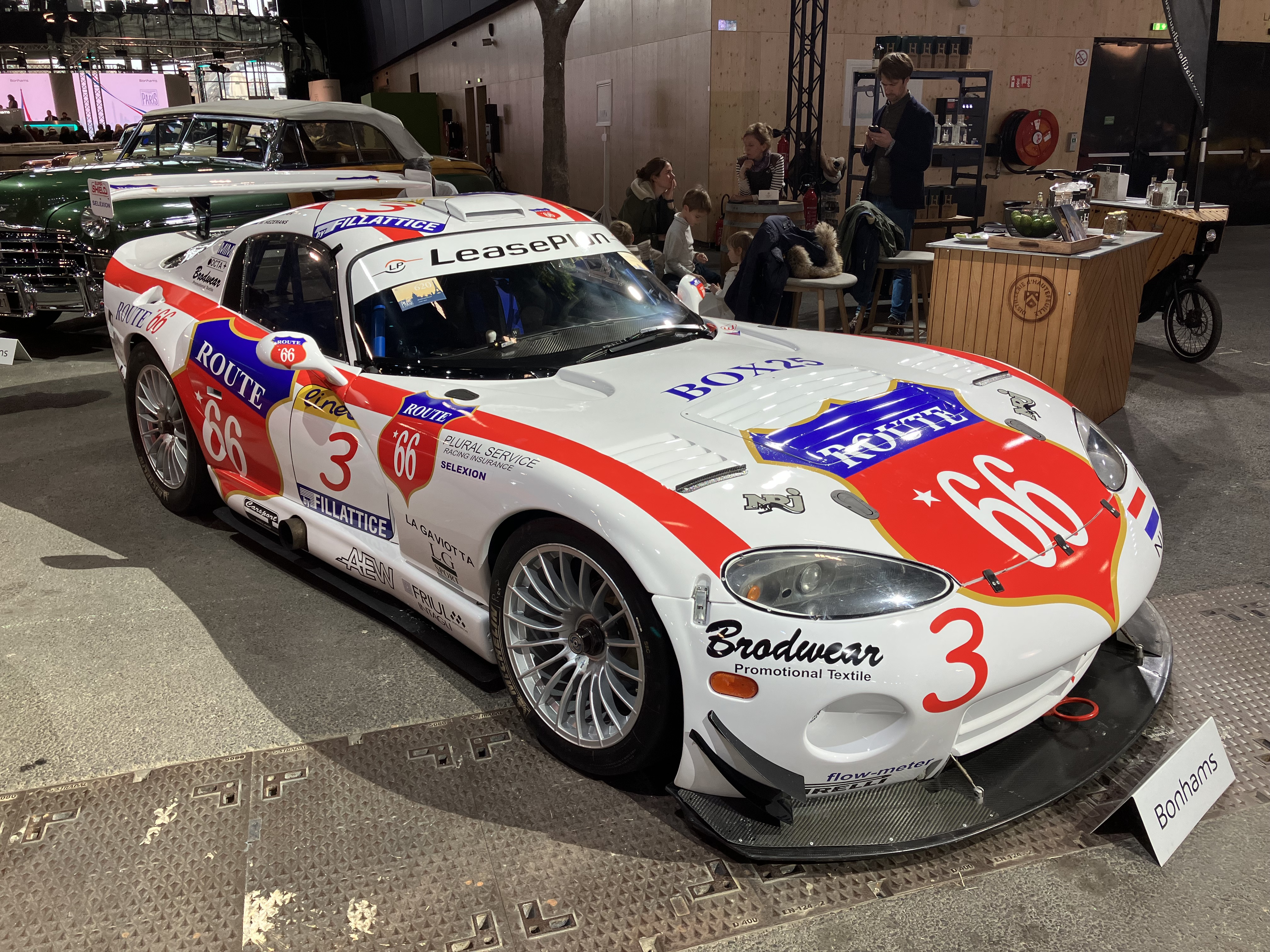
2000 Team Carsport Holland's #3 Viper GTS-R

For 2000, Oreca chose to concentrate on North America, leaving the FIA GT Championship to privateers. The team opened the season with one of their most notable victories, winning the 24 Hours of Daytona by a small margin over the new Chevrolet Corvette factory team. Oreca went on to win ten races in the American Le Mans Series, eventually falling to Corvette in two rounds late in the season but once again securing the championship. Oreca would also outperform Corvette at Le Mans, winning their third straight class victory with a seventh-place finish. In FIA GT, the Paul Belmondo and new Carsport Holland teams would run strong and win a collective four races, but would not be able to overcome the five victories by the Lister Storm, forcing the two teams to settle for second and third in the championship. In French GT, the DDO, ART, and MMI squads would combine for a total of eight Viper victories.

The backing by Chrysler officially ended in 2001, as Chrysler and Oreca had begun work the previous year on developing a Le Mans Prototype, forcing Oreca to abandon their Viper teams. The American Viperacing squad would be the sole contender in the American Le Mans Series, scoring no victories and finishing the season in third for the championship. FIA GT would however see a blossoming of teams, as eight different Viper squads competed over the season. Larbre Compétition would win three events (including the Spa 24 Hours) and win the championship, while Carsport Holland won two races and finished second. Hayles Racing would win four races in British GT to win that championship by two points over Lister, while the DDO team would win five French GT events, and Zakspeed would manage to win the 24 Hours Nürburgring for the second time. Le Mans however would not see the Vipers repeat their past success, as the factory Corvette squad won the class and only a lone Viper finished.

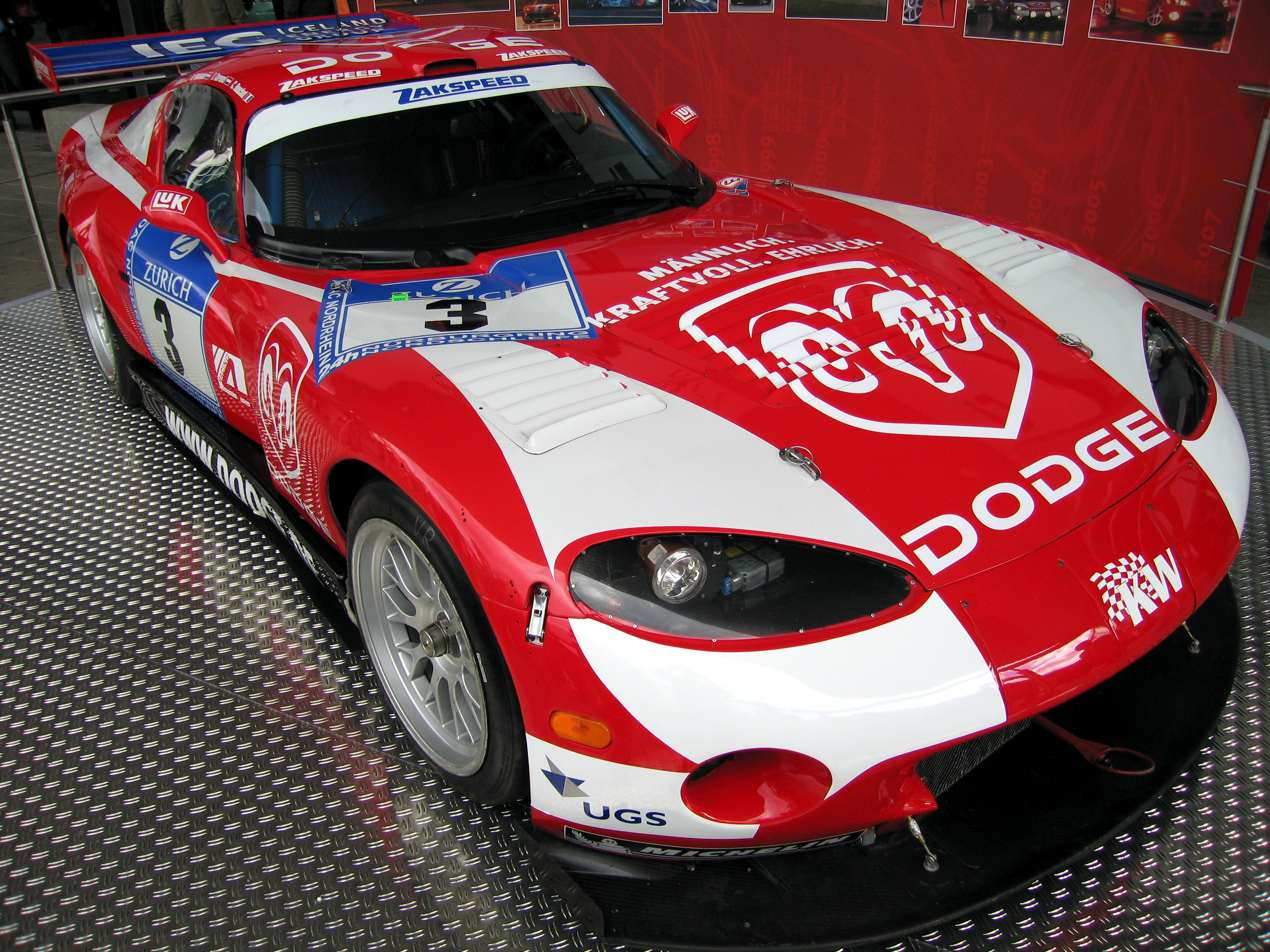
One of Zakspeed's Viper GTS-Rs from the 24 Hours of Nürburgring, advertising the new presence of Dodge in Europe

Larbre was able to defend their FIA GT championship in 2002, but were only able to win one race in the process. Carsport Holland and Paul Belmondo also managed single victories, while the new Ferrari 550s showed their potential with four wins. The only other victories for Vipers that season came in French GT, with four earned by DDO, and a third victory at the Nürburgring for Zakspeed. An Oreca-backed entry at Le Mans would manage to finish on the class podium, although several laps behind the two factory Corvettes.

In 2003, the dominance of the Prodrive-built Ferraris began. Vipers were unable to win any races in FIA GT, leaving Larbre as the best finishing Viper in the championship, a distant seventh. Some victories were still scored by Vipers however, as Larbre took six wins in French GT and Force One Racing a further two. The Team Taisan Viper in JGTC would also manage its first class victory in an event at Fuji Speedway. Vipers would compete for the first time in Italian GT, winning all but three races during the season. However at the same time, Vipers would make their final appearance at Le Mans, with Larbre finishing fourth in their class.

2004 would see the Viper GTS-Rs begin to be phased out. Only Zwaan's Racing would be entered in the full FIA GT season, earning ninth in the championship. Vipers would remain dominant in FFSA GT and Italian GT, winning eleven and five races respectively. For 2005, the only Viper entry in FIA GT would be a single entry at the Spa 24 Hours, finishing 12th, while Italian GT would see only three teams competing and unable to score any victories. French GT became the only series in which Vipers were competitive, which lured former Formula One champion Alain Prost to run Viper GTS-R chassis #C50 in the series as part of his 50th birthday, eventually winning one race as part of the Vipers nine victories that season.

In 2006, Viper GTS-Rs continue in French GT and Italian GT, although their victories continued to diminish. By 2007, the homologation of the Viper GTS-Rs would come to an end as the Viper GTS bodystyle had been replaced nearly seven years prior. Few privateers entered Vipers in French and Italian GT, while Red Racing would enter a lone car in select rounds of the FIA GT Championship as part of the amateur Citation Cup but would be unable to even finish any of its events. In 2008 Italian team Lanza Motorsport entered a GTS-R in the Italian round of the FIA GT Championship, but the car did not finish the race.

In 2007, a Viper GTS-R was first raced during a historic event at Magny-Cours by Florent Moulin. The then-new GT90s Revival series accepts former FIA GT racers from 1990 to 2000. The car was chassis C23, the FIA GT Championship-winning car from 1999, as driven by Karl Wendlinger and Olivier Beretta, completely restored into original 1999 Oreca specifications. The same car was invited to the Goodwood Festival of Speed in 2008 and driven by its period driver Justin Bell, in its Le Mans 1999 livery, when Justin drove this very car to second place in GTS. In November 2008 Florent Moulin entered it again in the GT90s Revival race at Paul Ricard, co-driven by another of its period drivers from Le Mans 1999, Marc Duez. In 2010, chassis 27 participated in the Goodwood Festival of Speed to celebrate the tenth anniversary 24 Hours of Daytona victory. One of the Viper GTS-Rs run by Oreca in the 1997 24 Hours of Le Mans was purchased by Ken Finneran and entered in the 2007 24 Hours of Silverstone race organised by Britcar. It was entered by KTF Group and completed 142 laps before retiring. The drivers were Phil Bennett, Mark Dwyer, Finneran, Robert Huff and Adam Sharpe.

== Achievements ==
Since its racing debut in 1996, the Viper GTS-R has achieved many victories or class wins in competition, as well as many series championships. This is a list of some of the more notable victories by the Viper GTS-Rs.

Overall victory
Type	Event	Years
Overall	24 Hours Nürburgring	1999, 2001, 2002
Overall	Rolex 24 at Daytona	2000
Overall	Spa 24 Hours	2001, 2002
Class victory	24 Hours of Le Mans	1998, 1999, 2000
Class victory	12 Hours of Sebring	2000
Class victory	Petit Le Mans	1999
Class victory	Fuji 1000 km	1999
Class victory	Mil Milhas Brasileiras	2004
Class victory	24 Hours Nürburgring	2005, 2006, 2007
Series Championships	FIA GT Championship	1997, 1998, 1999, 2001, 2002
Series Championships	American Le Mans Series	1999, 2000
Series Championships	FFSA GT Championship	2001, 2003, 2004, 2005
Series Championships	Belgian GT Championship	2001, 2002, 2003, 2004, 2009
Series Championships	British GT Championship	1998
Series Championships	Italian GT Championship	2003, 2004
Series Championships	Swedish GTR Championship	2001, 2002, 2003
Series Championships	VLN Championship	1999
Series Championships	Euro GT Series	2003

== Replacement ==
Following Dodge's official end of their factory-backed racing program in 2001, as well as the redesigning of the Viper in 2003, the first generation GTS-Rs were retired. Nonetheless, Dodge persevered in motorsports competition by backing a different type of racing endeavor. Unlike before, there would be no factory team. These racing vehicles, known as Dodge Viper Competition Coupes, would be sold to those customers who wanted a ready-made track car. Because they complied with the FIA GT3 regulations, these vehicles were prevented from exhibiting the same level of extreme performance characteristic of the earlier Viper GTS-Rs which ran in GT1. In this instance, Oreca ran the Viper Competition Coupe program, building the cars for Dodge.

Attempts were made by Oreca as well as privateers Racing Box and Woodhouse Performance to modify Viper Competition Coupes to run in the faster GT2 class. Although this did not receive official support from Dodge, they did express interest in exploring the idea.

Coinciding with the release of the fifth generation Viper road car in 2012, Chrysler returned to motorsports competition under the SRT Motorsports banner in the American Le Mans Series with the SRT Viper GTS-R race car. After winning the GTLM Class of the Tudor United Sportscar Championship in 2014, factory support was again terminated. Nevertheless, private racing teams were still able to compete with the 2013 release of the Dodge Viper SRT GT3-R which was FIA GT3 homologated as GT3-036.
