= Lumin =

Lumin may refer to the following:

- Changan Lumin, an electric city car by Chinece manufacturer Changan
- Lumin Tsukiboshi, the VTuber singer alias of Diana Garnet

Lumin is also a transliteration of multiple Chinese given names. Notable people with these names include:

- He Lumin (born 1981), Chinese taekwondo practitioner
- Wang Lumin (born 1990), Chinese Greco-Roman wrestler
- Zhou Lumin (born 1956), Chinese volleyball player

== See also ==
- Luminism (disambiguation)
- Luminescence (disambiguation)
- Luminosity (disambiguation)
- Luminous (disambiguation)
- Luminal (disambiguation)
- Lumen (disambiguation)
- LuminAID, solar-rechargeable light
- Journal of Luminescence (abbreviation: J. Lumin.), monthly peer-reviewed scientific journal
