= Luminus (disambiguation) =

Luminus is a Belgian electricity and natural gas company.

Luminus may also refer to:

- Luminus (comics), a DC Animated Universe character
- Luminus Arena, now Cegeka Arena, in Genk, Belgium

== See also ==
- Luminous (disambiguation)
- Sono Luminus, a classical music record label
