= Gothic Revival decorative arts =

Besides architecture, the Gothic Revival also manifested in furniture, metalworks, ceramics and other decorative arts during the 19th century. In France, it was the first reaction against the hegemony of Neoclassicism. At the end of the Restoration (1814–1830) and during the Louis-Philippe period (1830-1848), Gothic Revival motifs started to appear in France, together with revivals of the Renaissance and of Rococo. During these two periods, the vogue for medieval things led craftsmen to adopt Gothic decorative motifs in their work, such as bell turrets, lancet arches, trefoils, Gothic tracery and rose windows. This style was also as "Cathedral style" ("À la catédrale") or "Troubadour style" ("style troubadour").

For a long time, it was believed that romanticism was the cause of the return to the Gothic style in French decorative arts and that it was appropriate to look for its origin there. This is actually much further away. At the time of the French Revolution, an archaeologist, Alexandre Lenoir, was appointed curator of the Petits-Augustins depot, where sculptures, statues and tombs removed from churches, abbeys and convents had been transported. Lenoir organized the Museum of French Monuments (1795-1816). He was the first to restore the taste for the works of the Middle Ages, which progressed slowly to flourish a quarter of a century later. In fact, romanticism only spread to the public the themes dear to archaeologists.

== Gallery ==
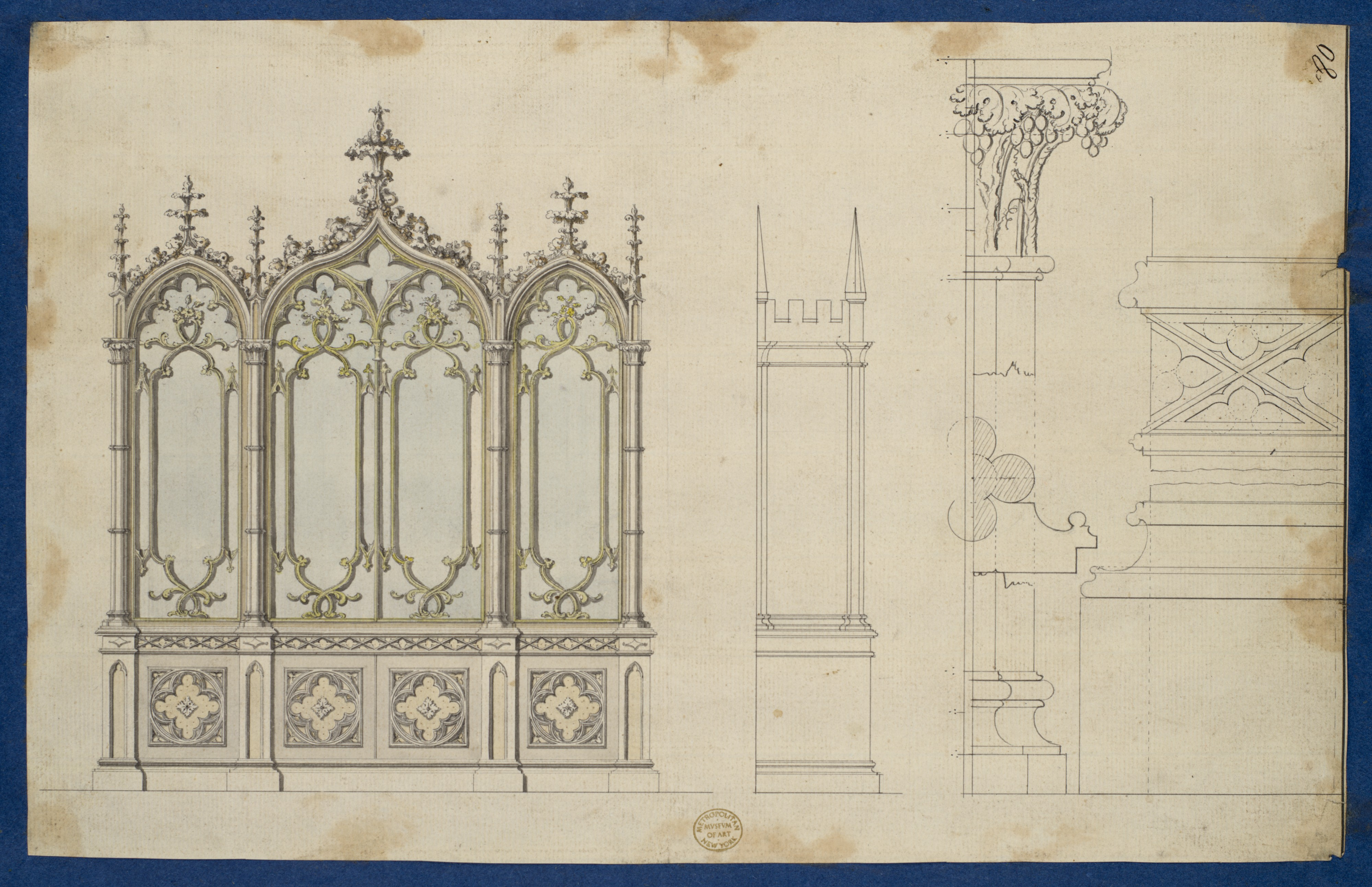
Design for a display case, by Thomas Chippendale, c.1753–1754, black ink and gray wash, Metropolitan Museum of Art, New York City

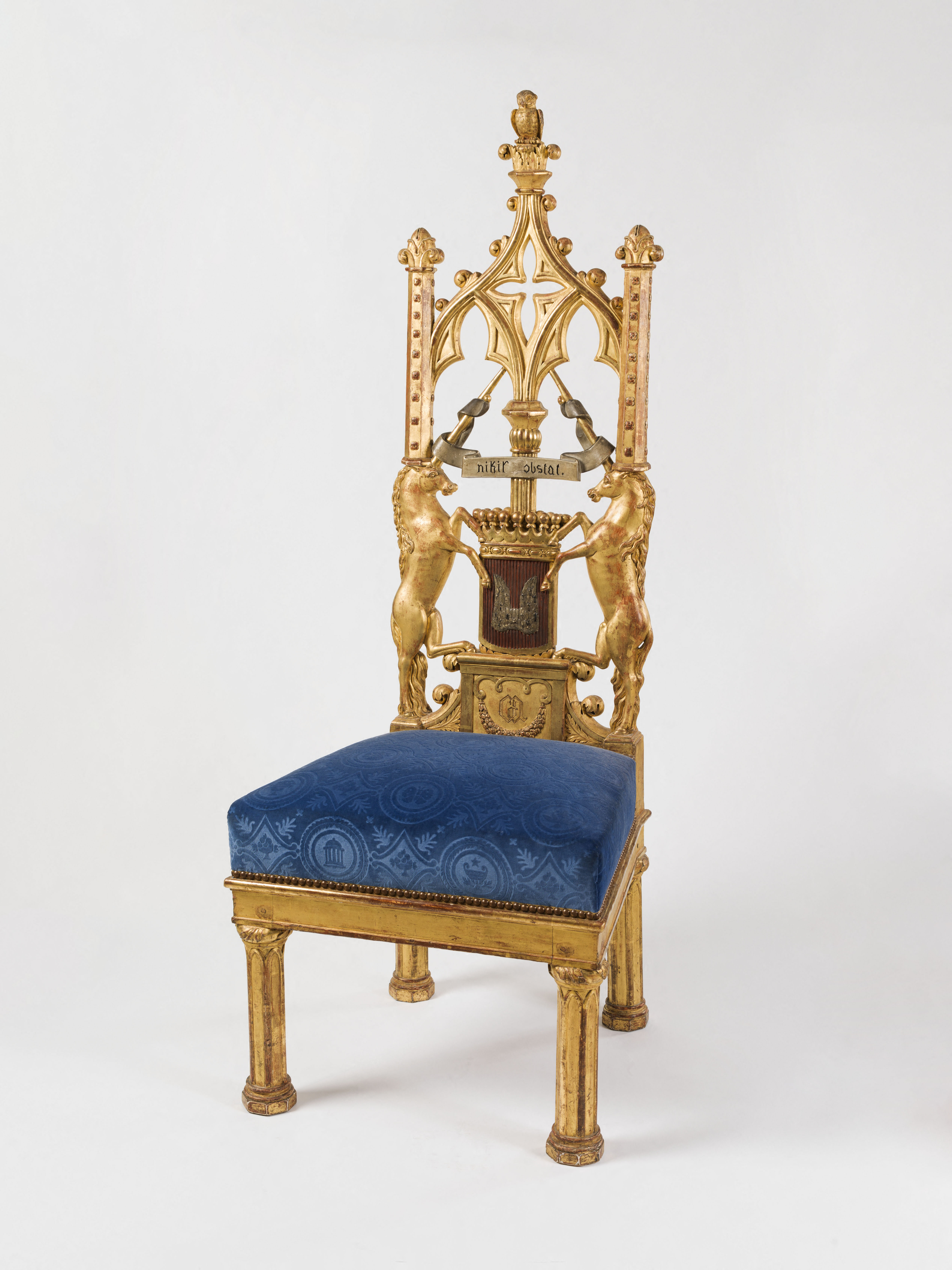
Chair from the Gothic Cabinet of the Osmond Countess, by François-Honoré-Georges Jacob-Desmalter, c.1817-1820, gilt wood, Petit Palais, Paris

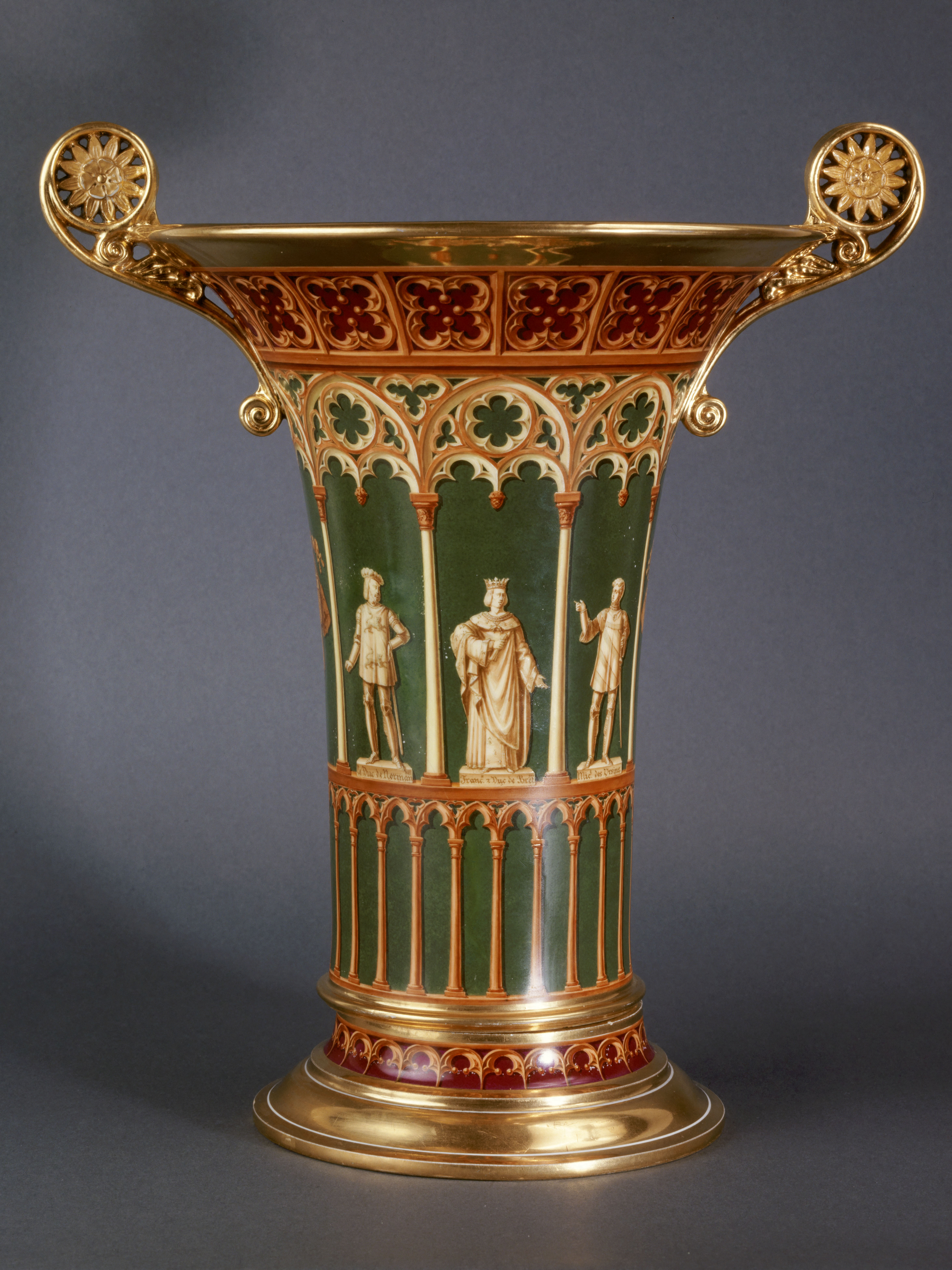
Jasmin-Percier Vase, painted by J. Vigné, gilded by Jean-Sébastien Sorel, and produced by the Sèvres Porcelain Manufactory, 1822, ceramic, Petit Palais

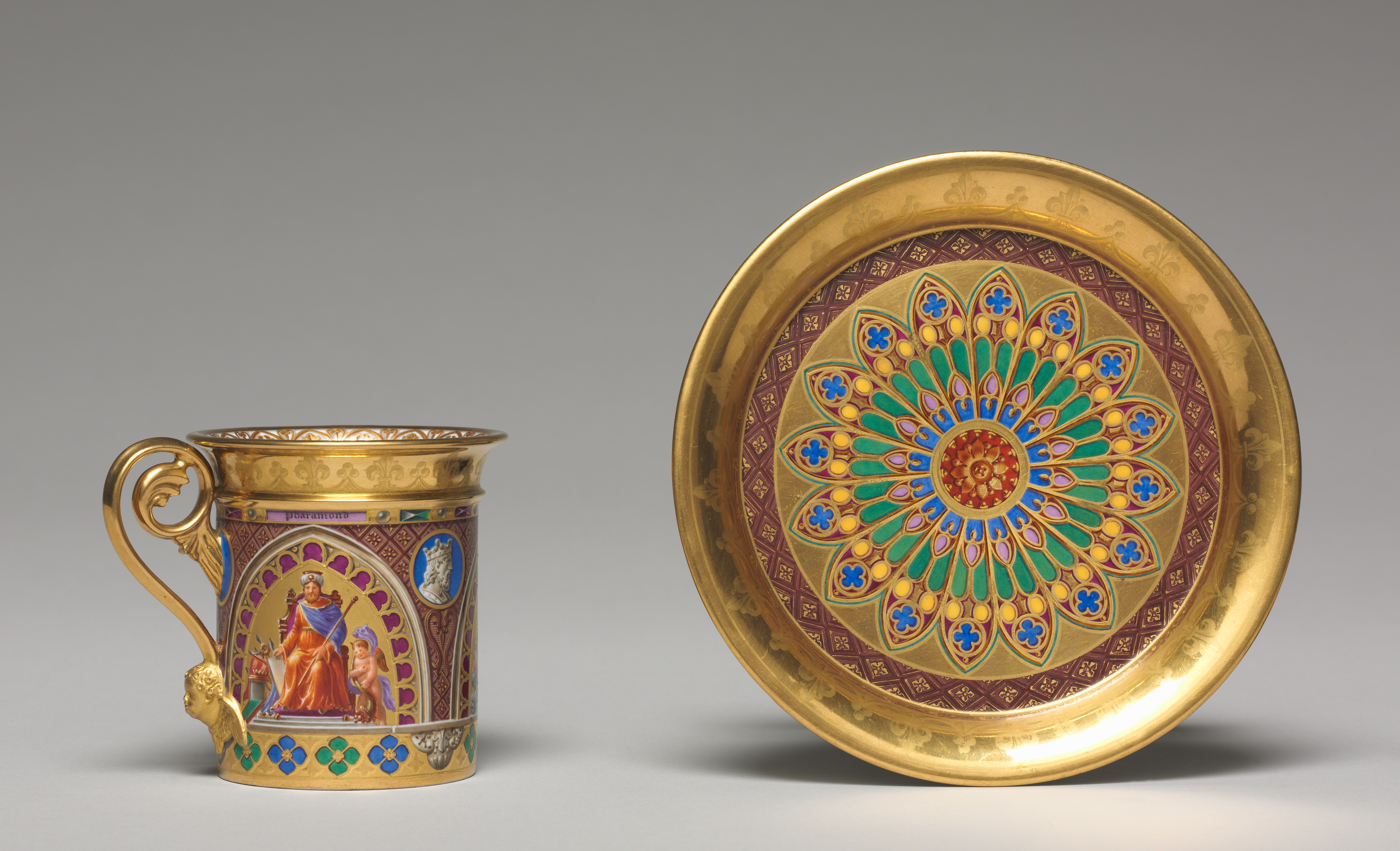
Cup and saucer, produced by the Sèvres Porcelain Manufactory and decorated by Pierre Huard, 1827, porcelain, Cleveland Museum of Art, Cleveland, Ohio, US

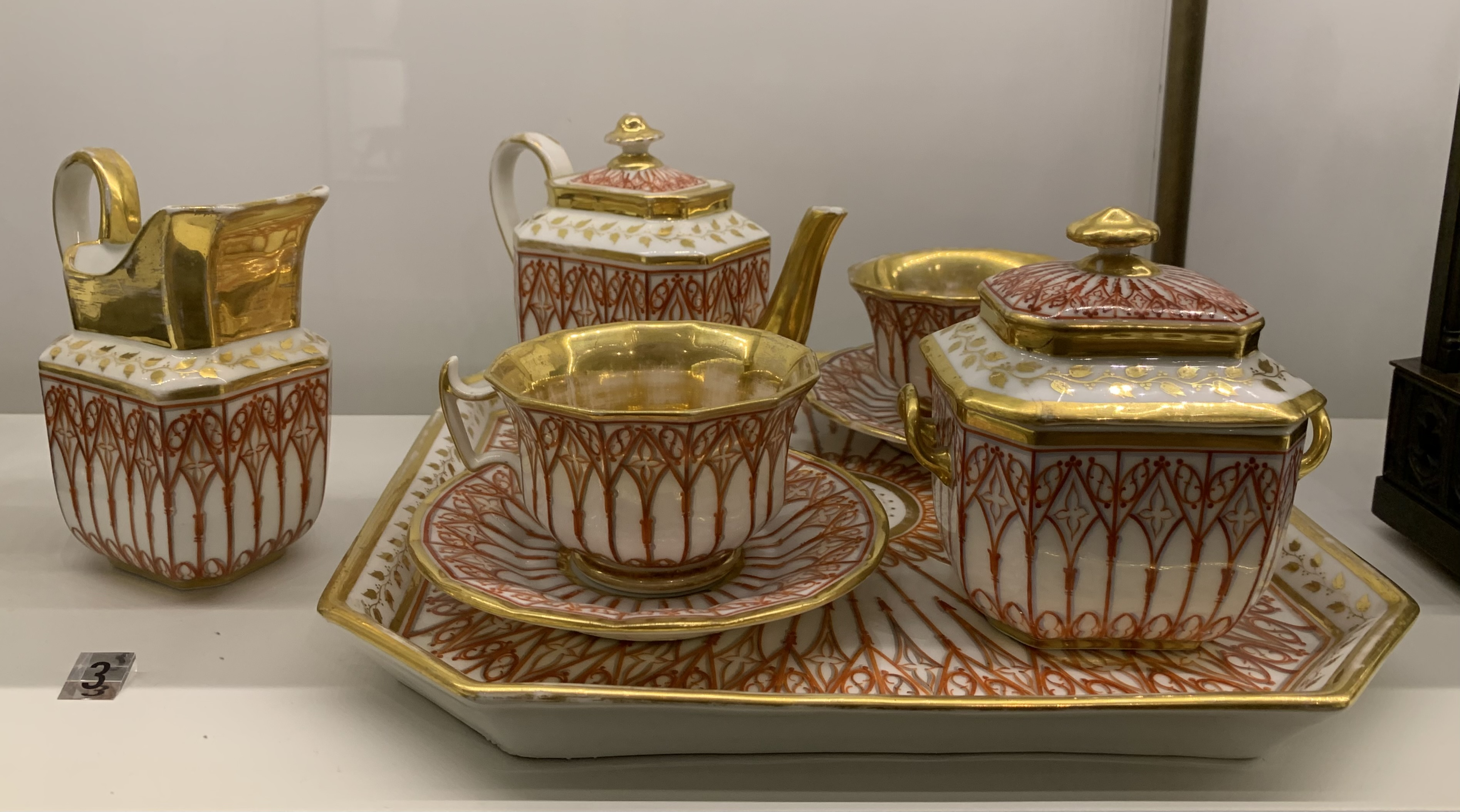
Set, unknown French maker, c.1830, hard-paste porcelain, Museum of Decorative Arts, Paris

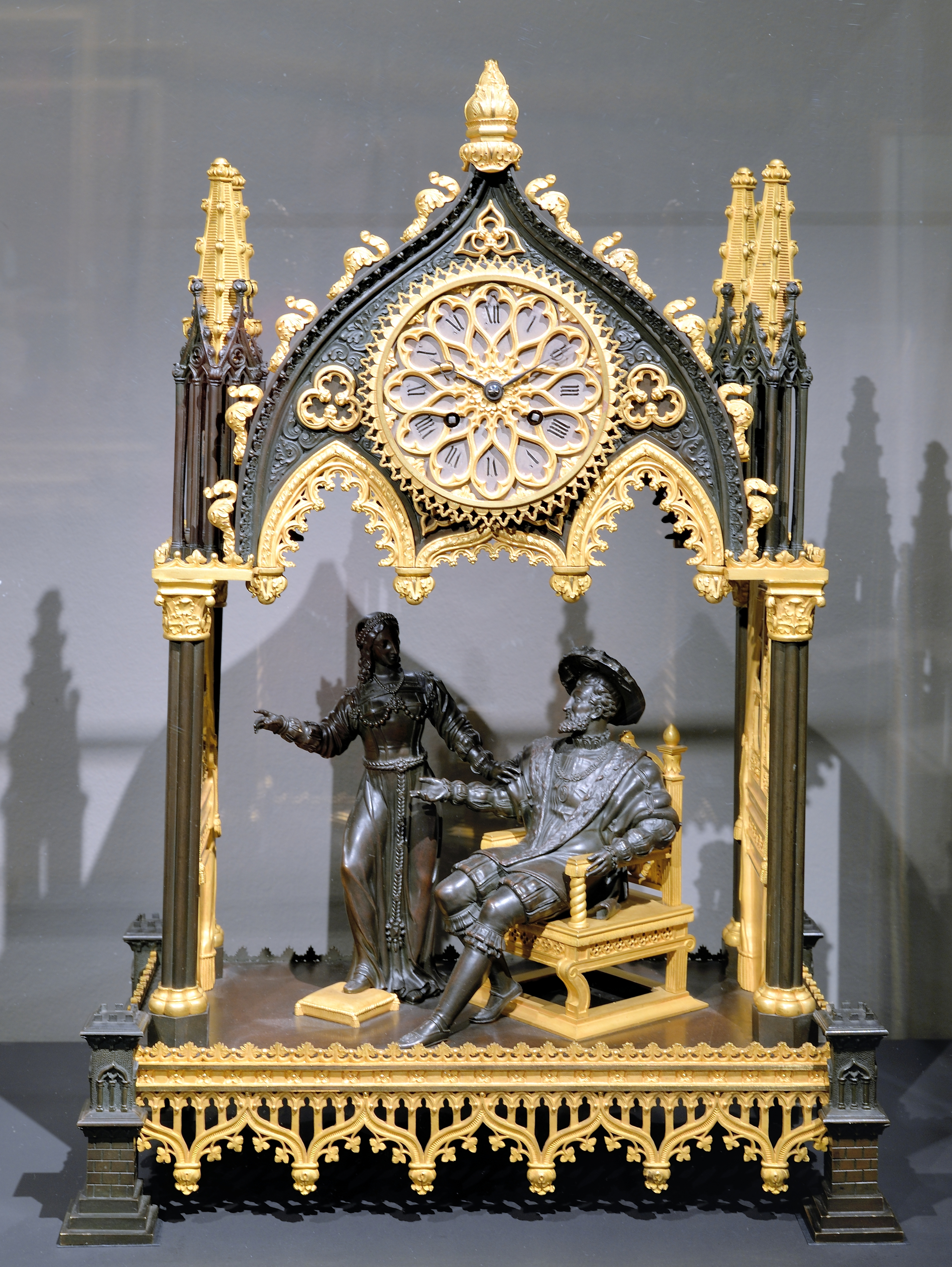
Clock with a group of François I and Marguerite de Navarre, after the François Ier montre à Marguerite de Navarre painting by Fleury François Richard, c.1830-1840, gilt and patinated bronze, Mobilier National

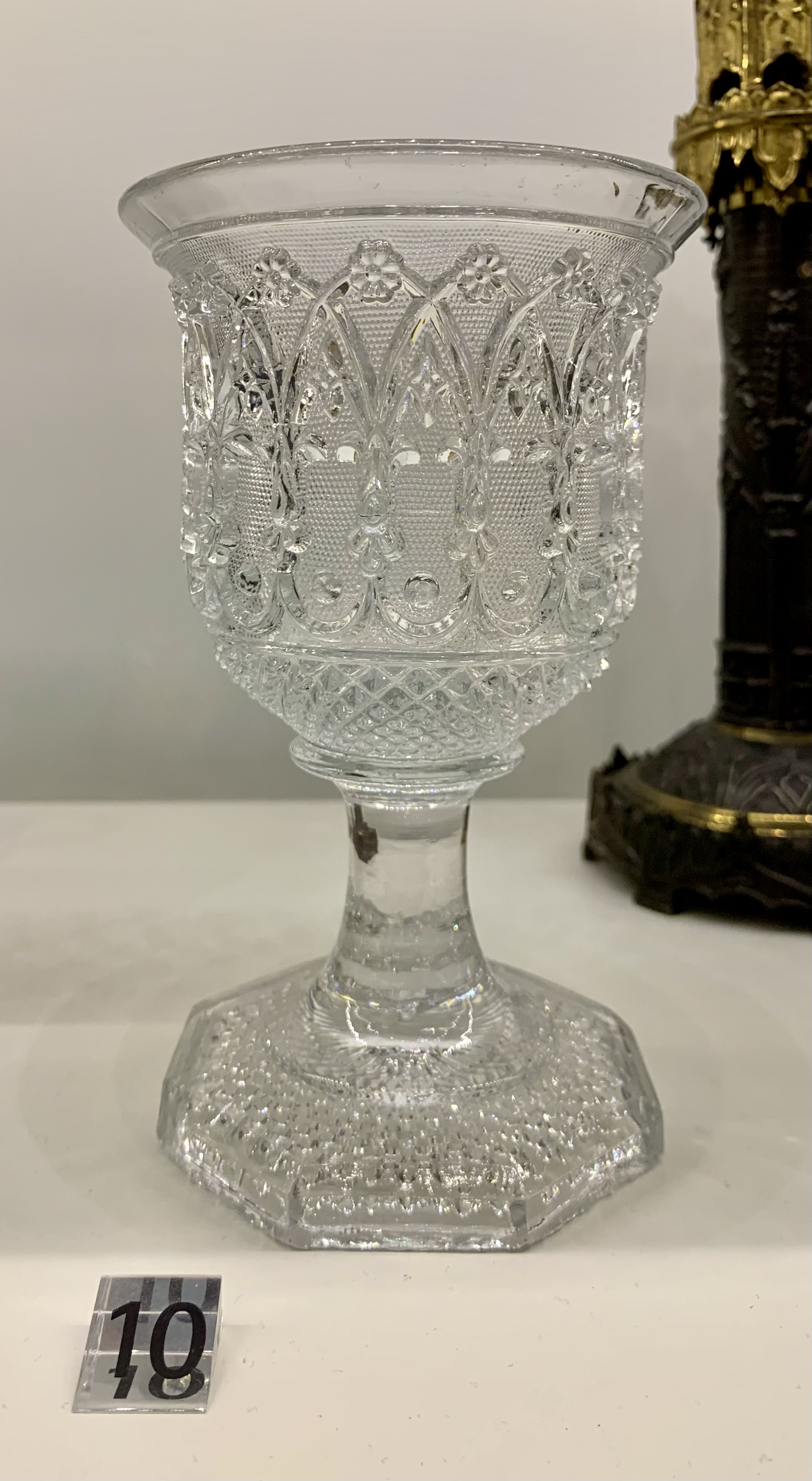
Goblet, by the Cristallerie de Saint-Louis, c.1834, mold-pressed crystal, Museum of Decorative Arts, Paris

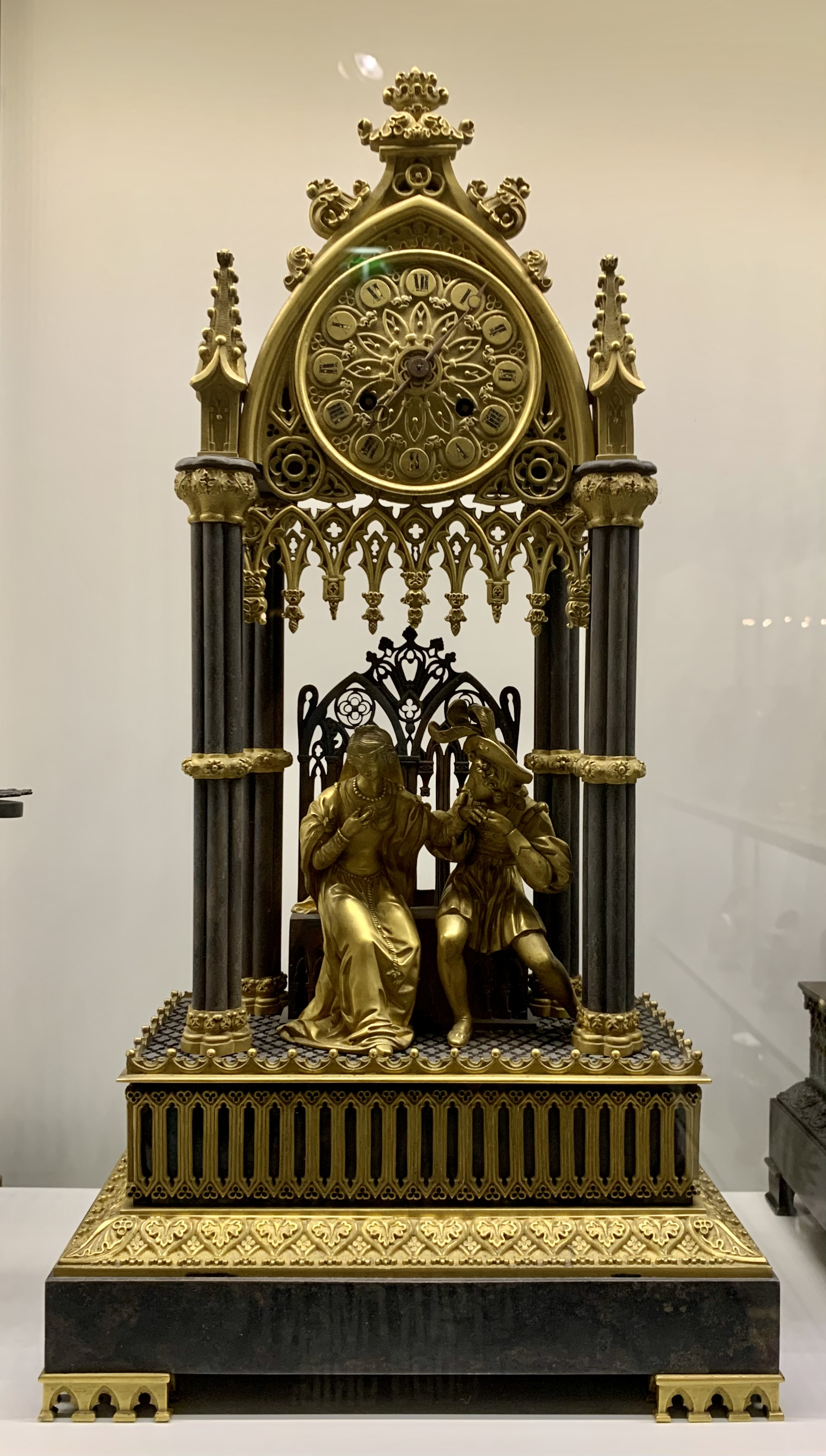
Clock, unknown French maker, c.1835-1840, gilt and patinated bronze, Museum of Decorative Arts, Paris

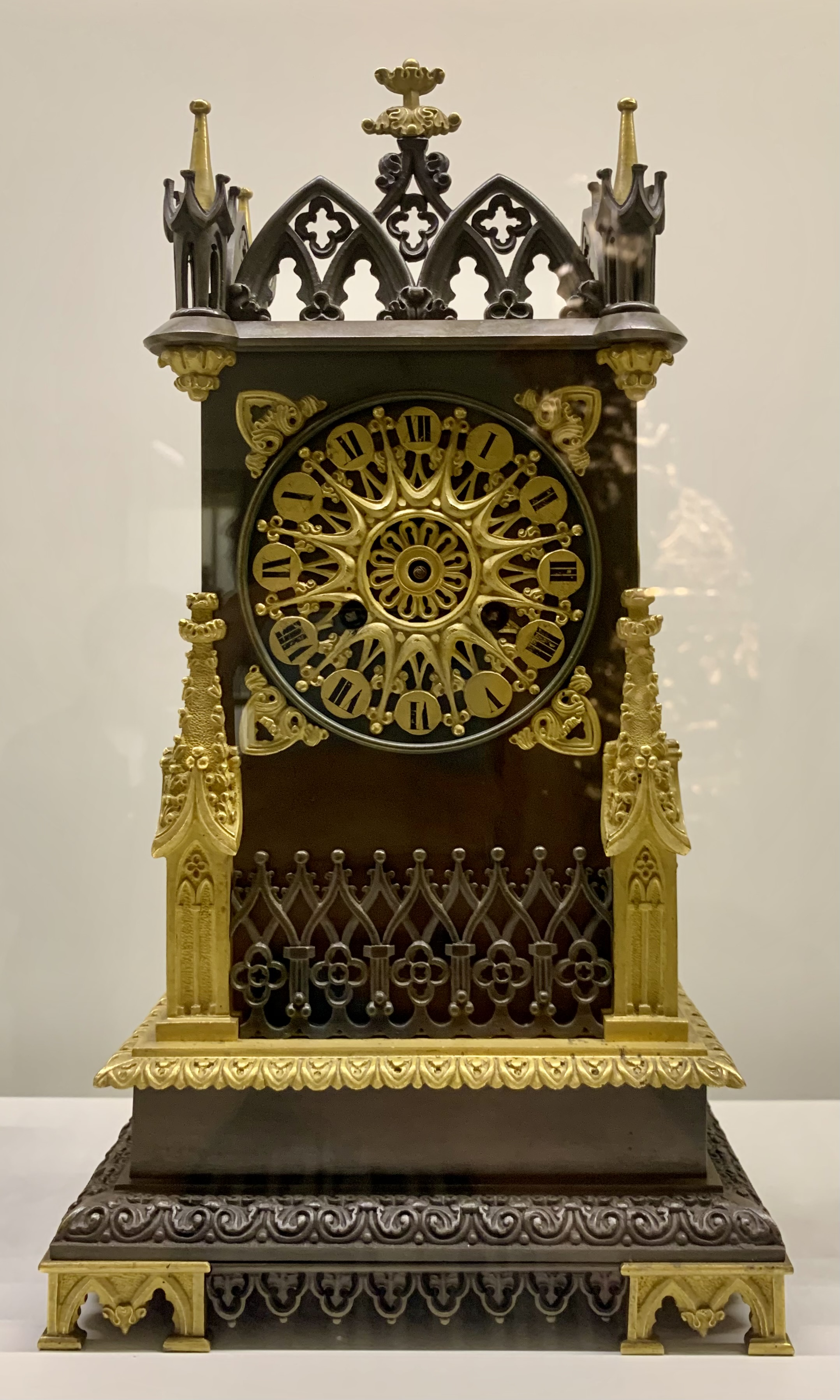
Clock, unknown French maker, c.1835-1850, gilt and patinated bronze, Museum of Decorative Arts, Paris

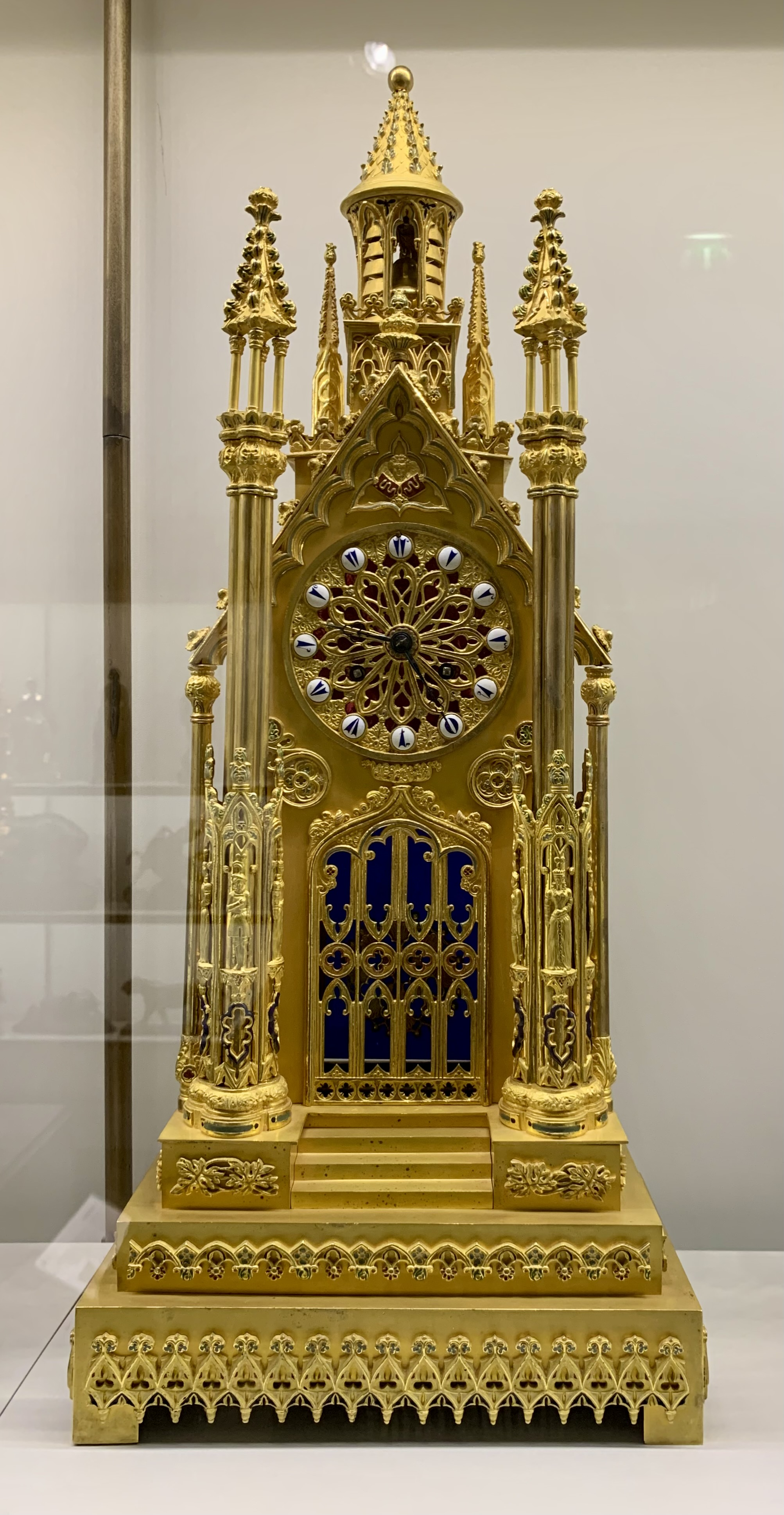
Clock, unknown French maker, c.1835-1850, gilt and enamelled copper, Museum of Decorative Arts, Paris

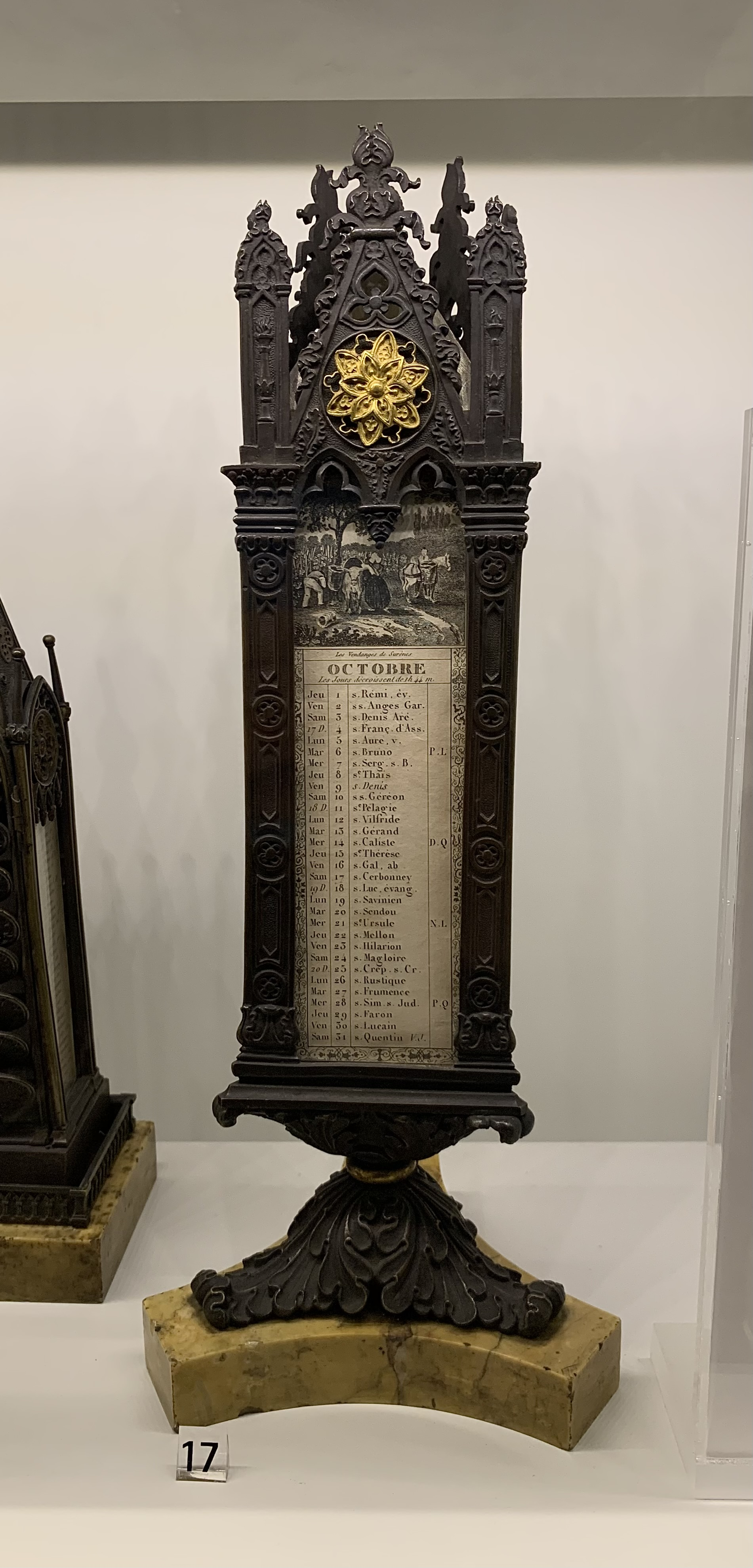
Office object with weekly, thermometer and calendar, unknown French maker, c.1835-1850, patinated and gilt bronze, paper background, glass, mercury, and marble pedestal, Museum of Decorative Arts, Paris

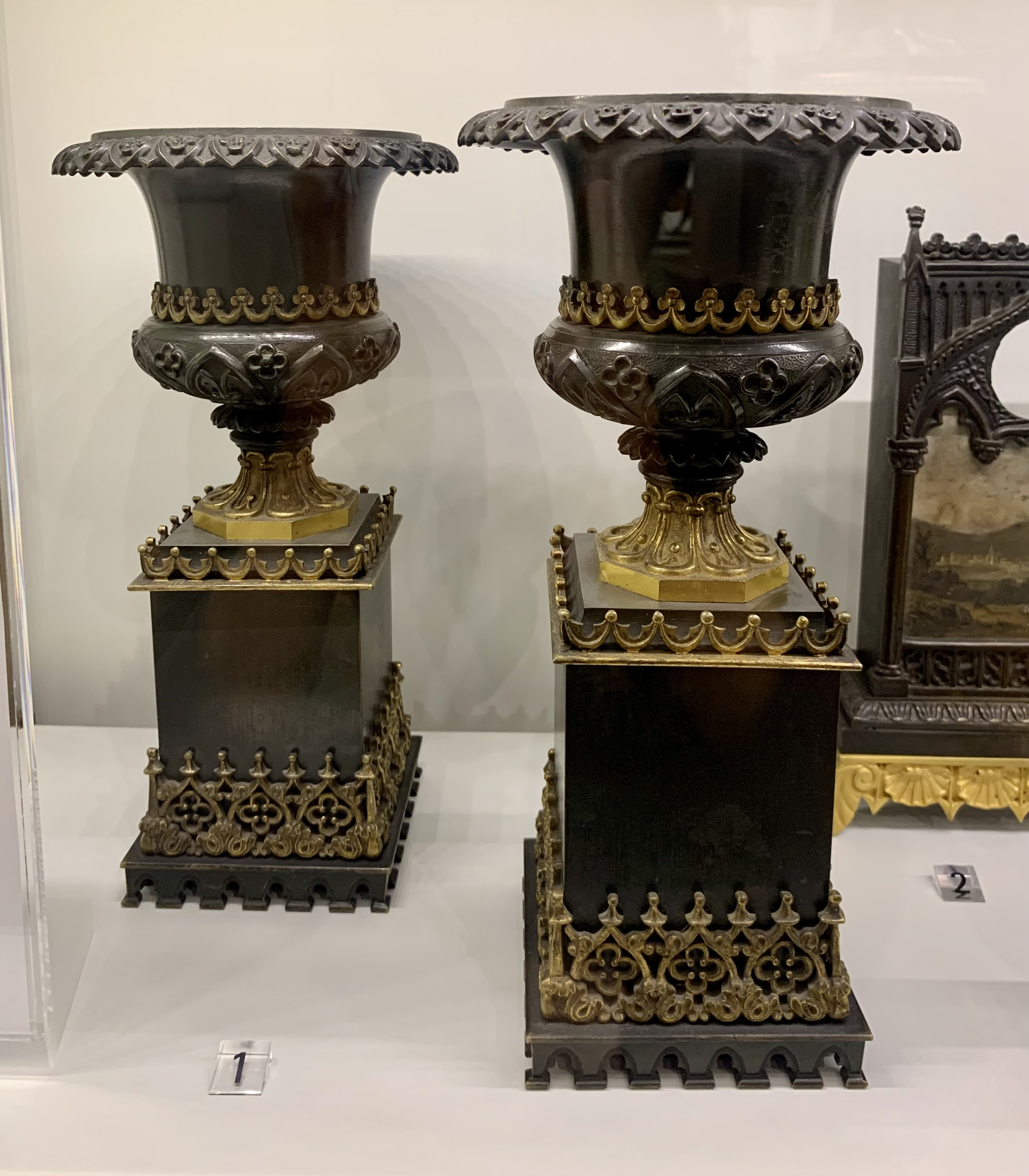
Pair of Medici vases, unknown French maker, c.1835-1850, patinated and gilt bronze, Museum of Decorative Arts, Paris

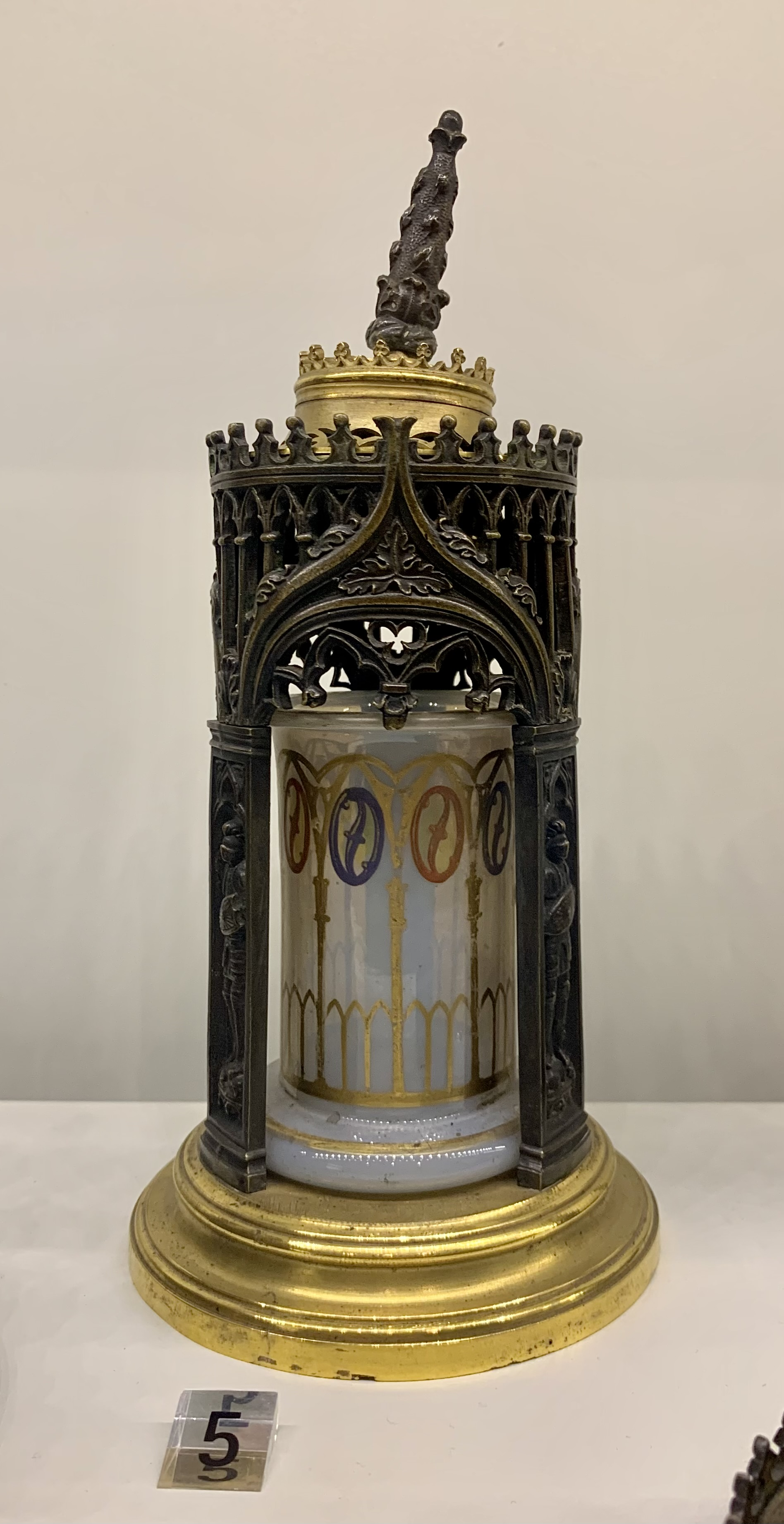
Night light, unknown French maker, c.1835-1850, patinated and gilt bronze, and opaline, Museum of Decorative Arts, Paris

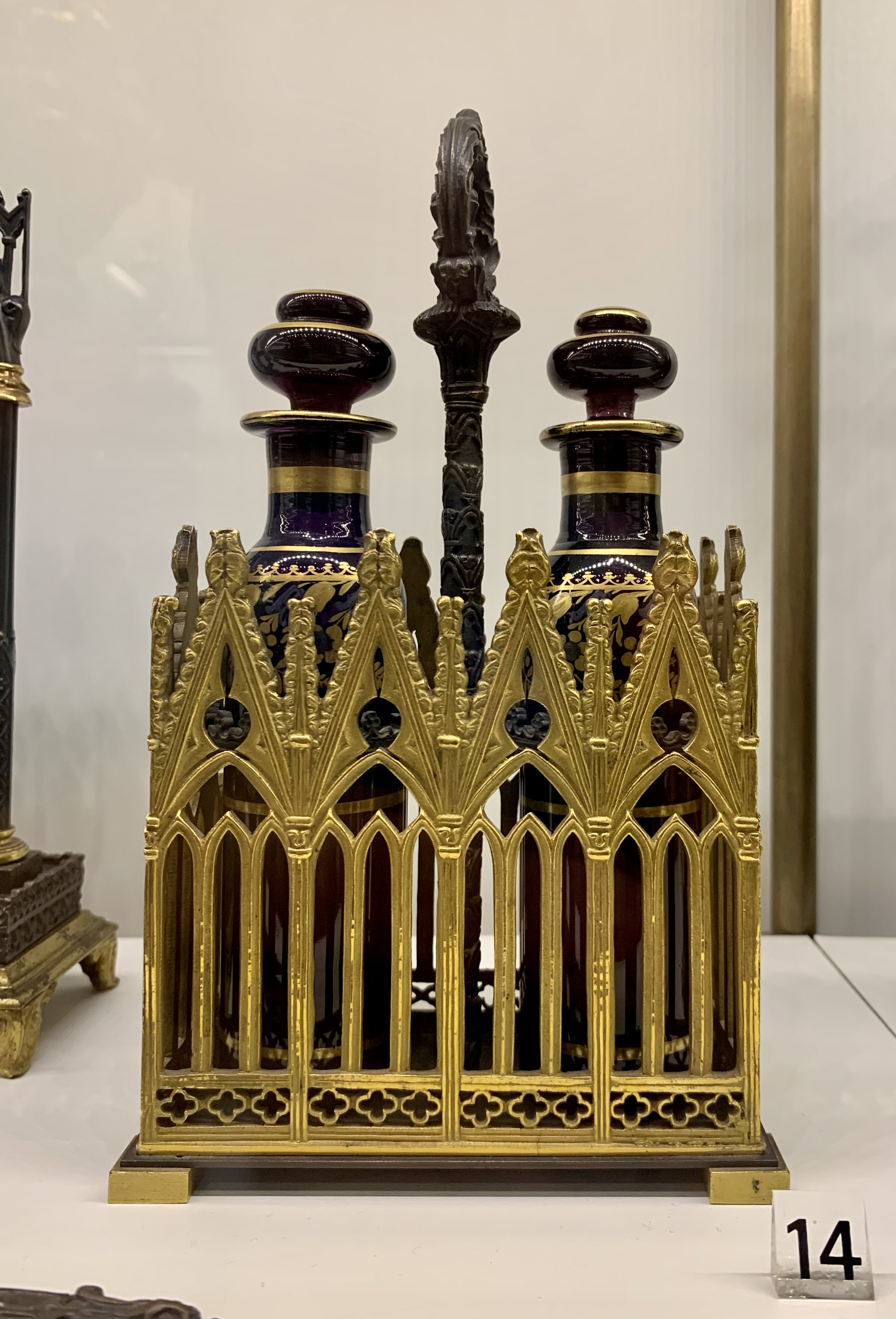
Cruets with flasks, unknown French maker, c.1835-1850, patinated and gilt bronze, silver?, flasks made of coloured glass, Museum of Decorative Arts, Paris

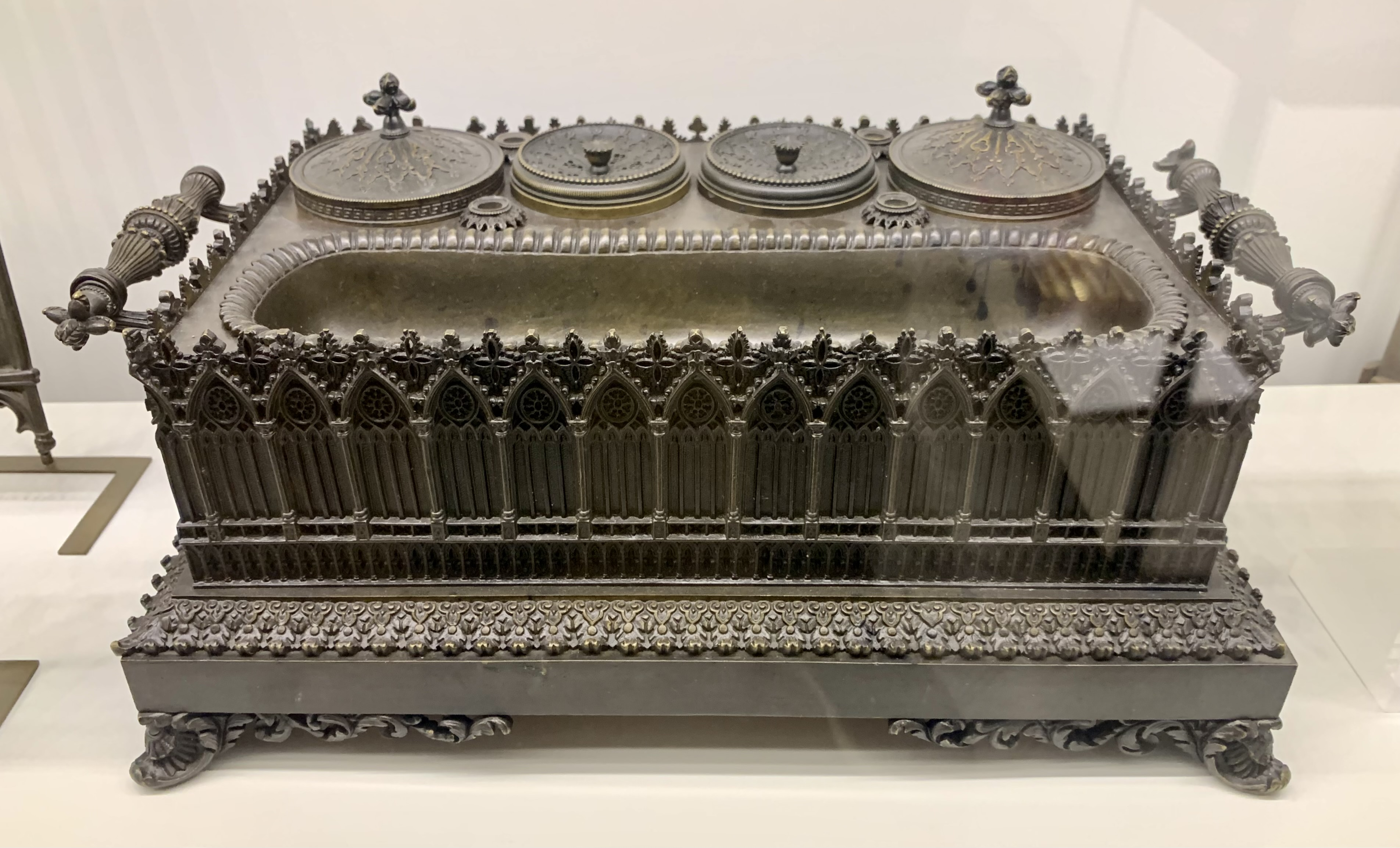
Ink pot, unknown French maker, c.1835-1850, patinated bronze, and porcelain buckets, Museum of Decorative Arts, Paris

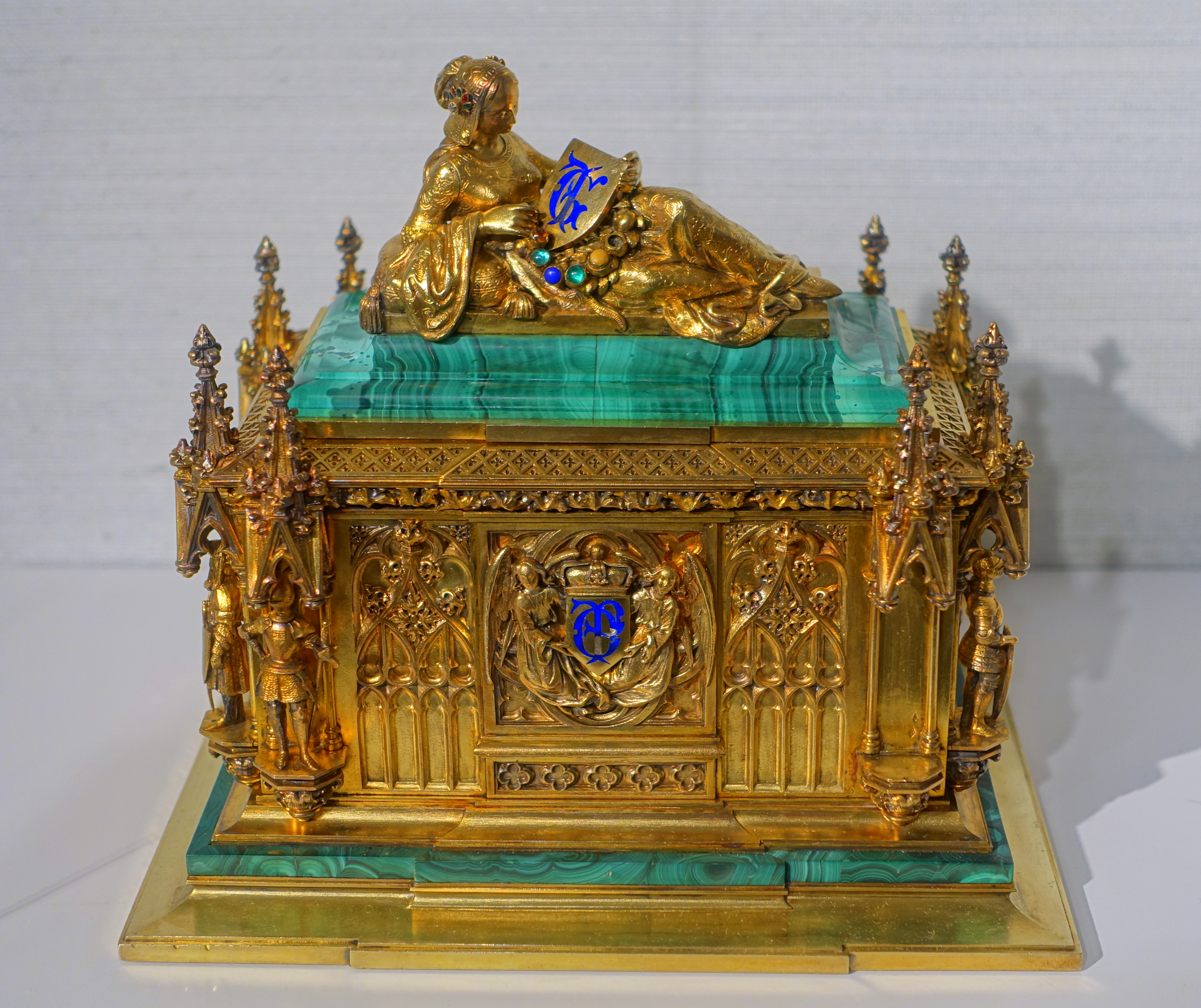
Ceremonial box for the wedding of Helene von Mecklenburg to Prince Ferdinand Philippe, by Fossin & Fils, 1837, gilt silver, malachite and enamel, Hessisches Landesmuseum Darmstadt, Darmstadt, Germany

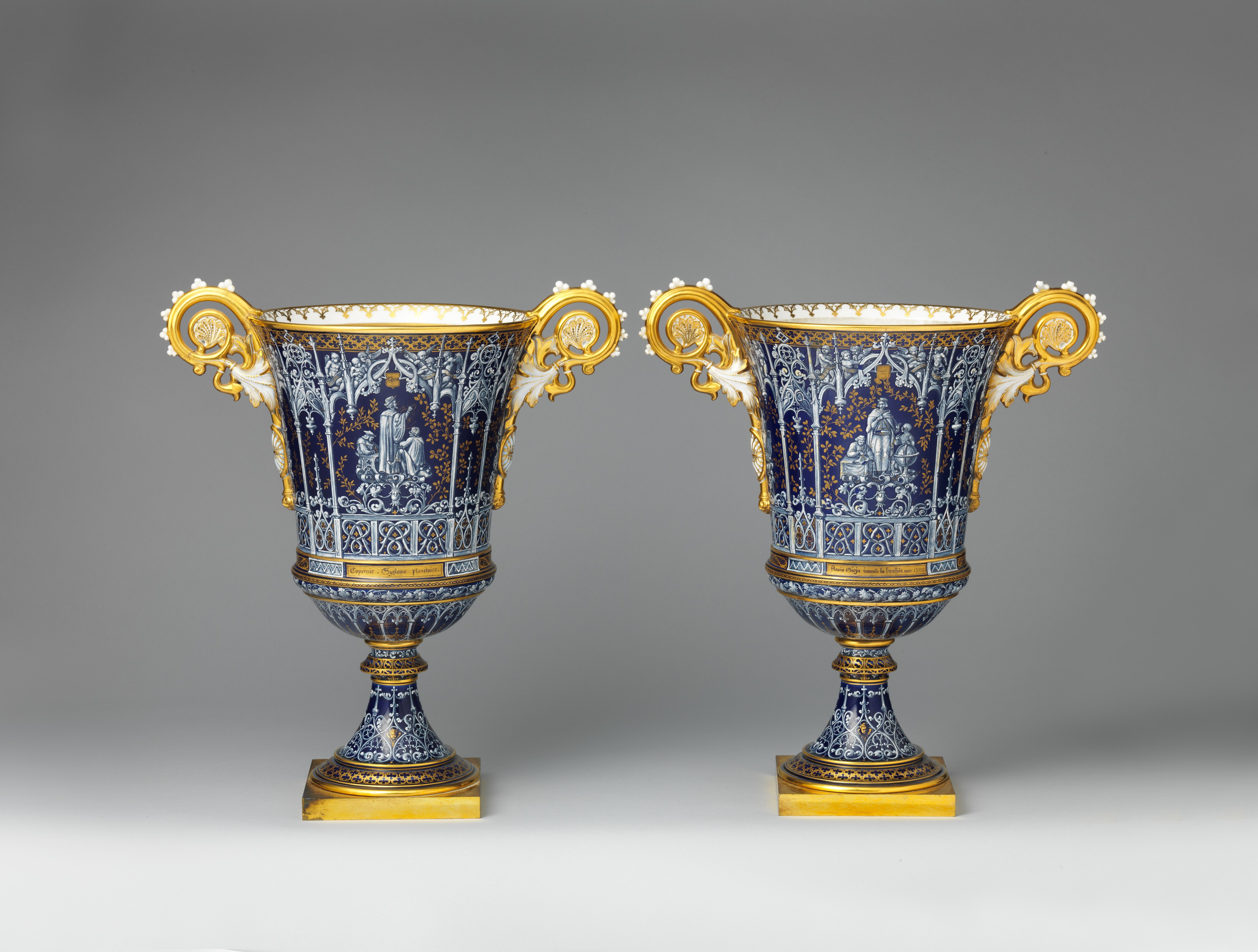
Pair of vases, by Alexandre-Évariste Fragonard and the Sèvres porcelain factory, manufactured in 1832, decorated in 1844, hard-paste porcelain, Metropolitan Museum of Art

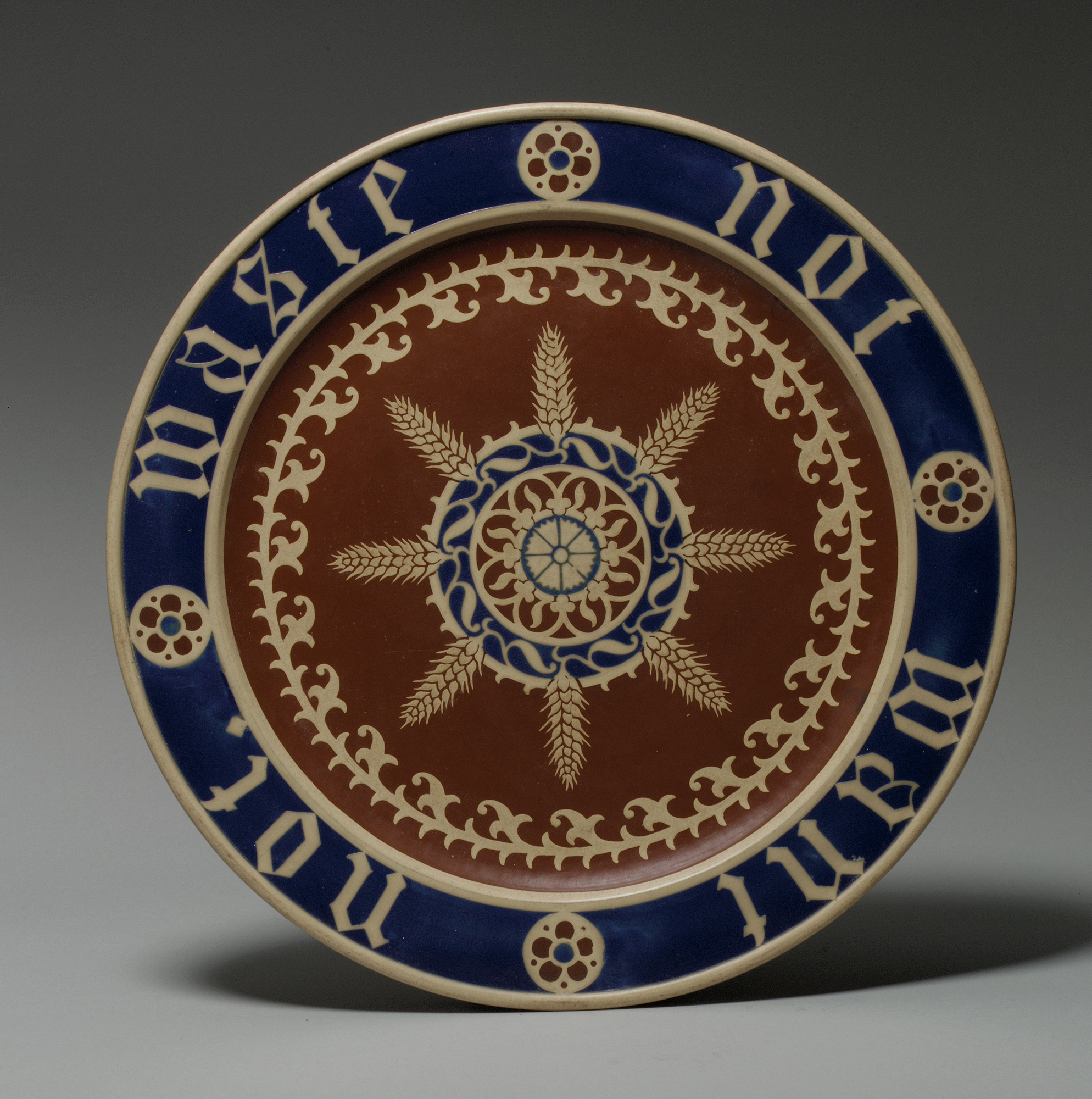
Bread plate, by Augustus Pugin, 1850, stoneware, Metropolitan Museum of Art

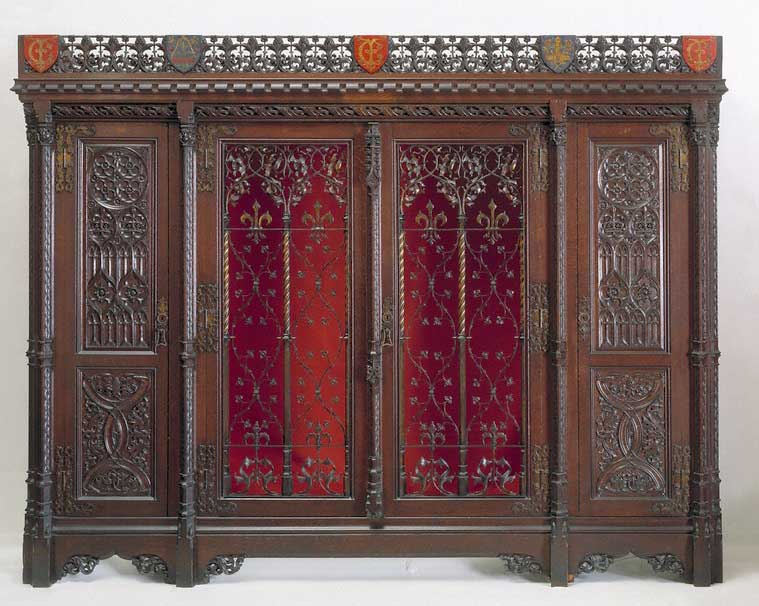
Armoire, designed by Augustus Pugin and made by John Gregory Crace, 1850, wood and glass, Victoria and Albert Museum, London

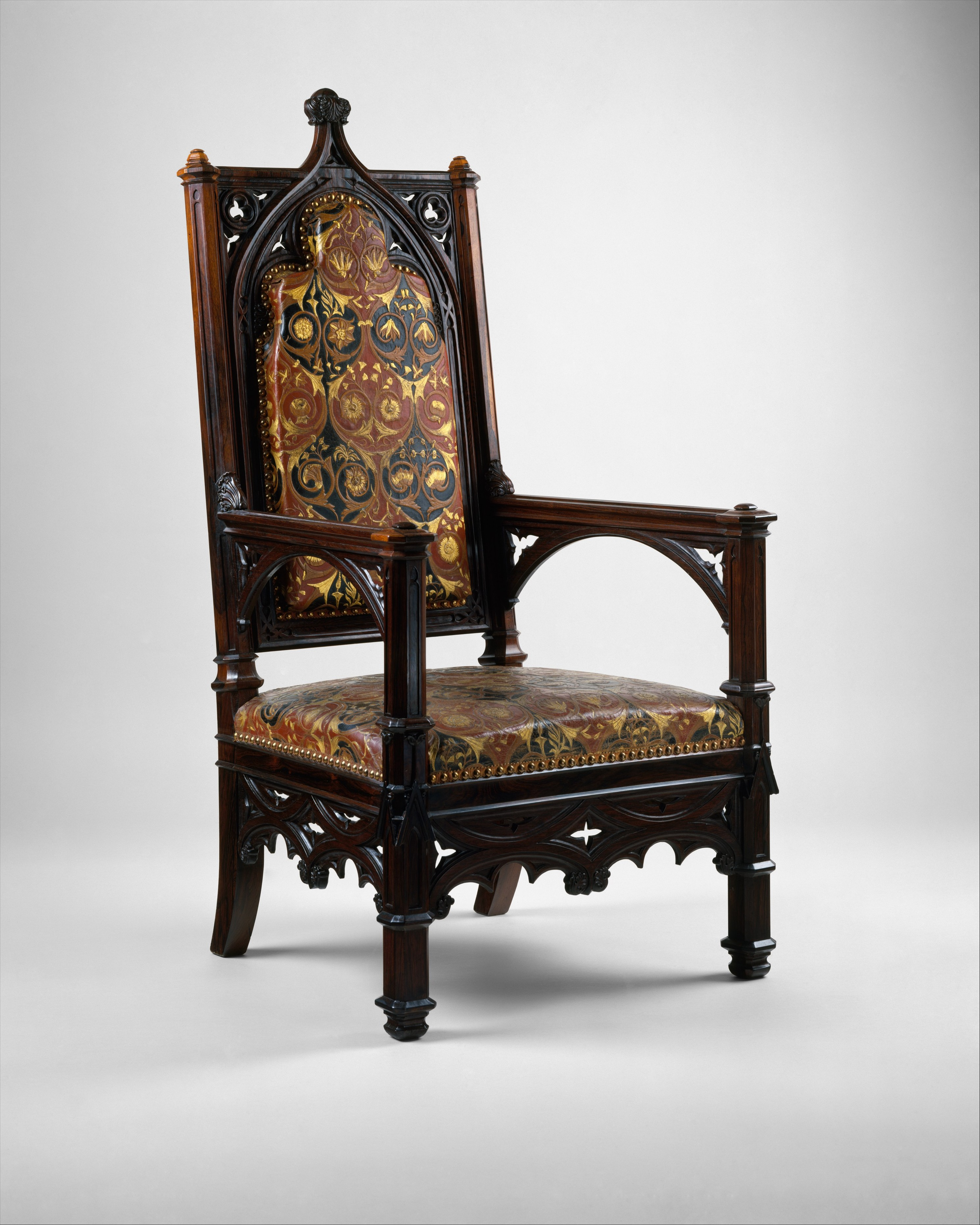
Armchair, by Joseph-Pierre- François Jeanselme and Jacques-Michel Dulud, c.1850, carved rosewood, leather, silk and serge, overall: 130.8 × 65.1 × 62.2 cm, Metropolitan Museum of Art

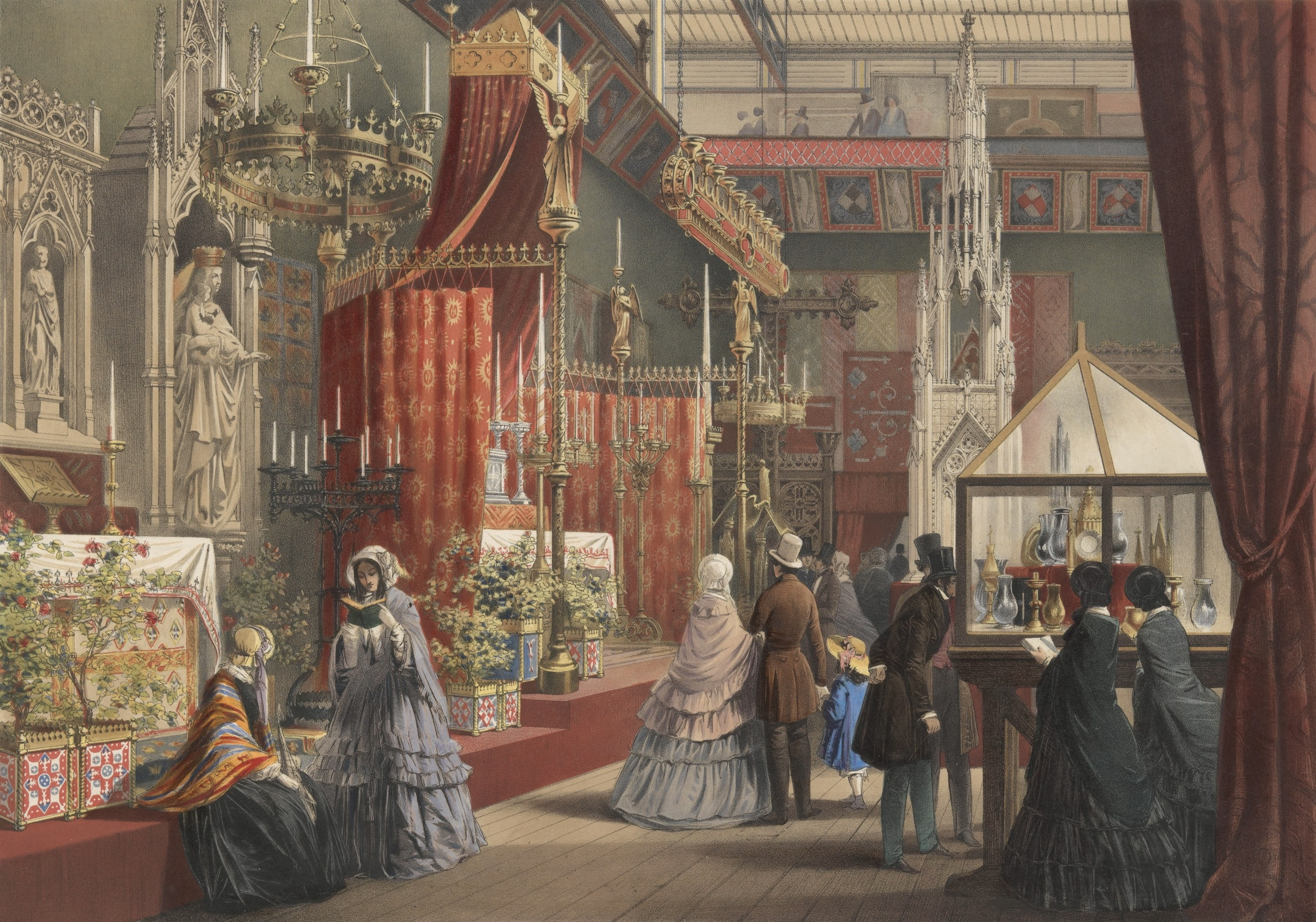
Augustus Pugin's Mediaeval Court at the Great Exhibition of 1851

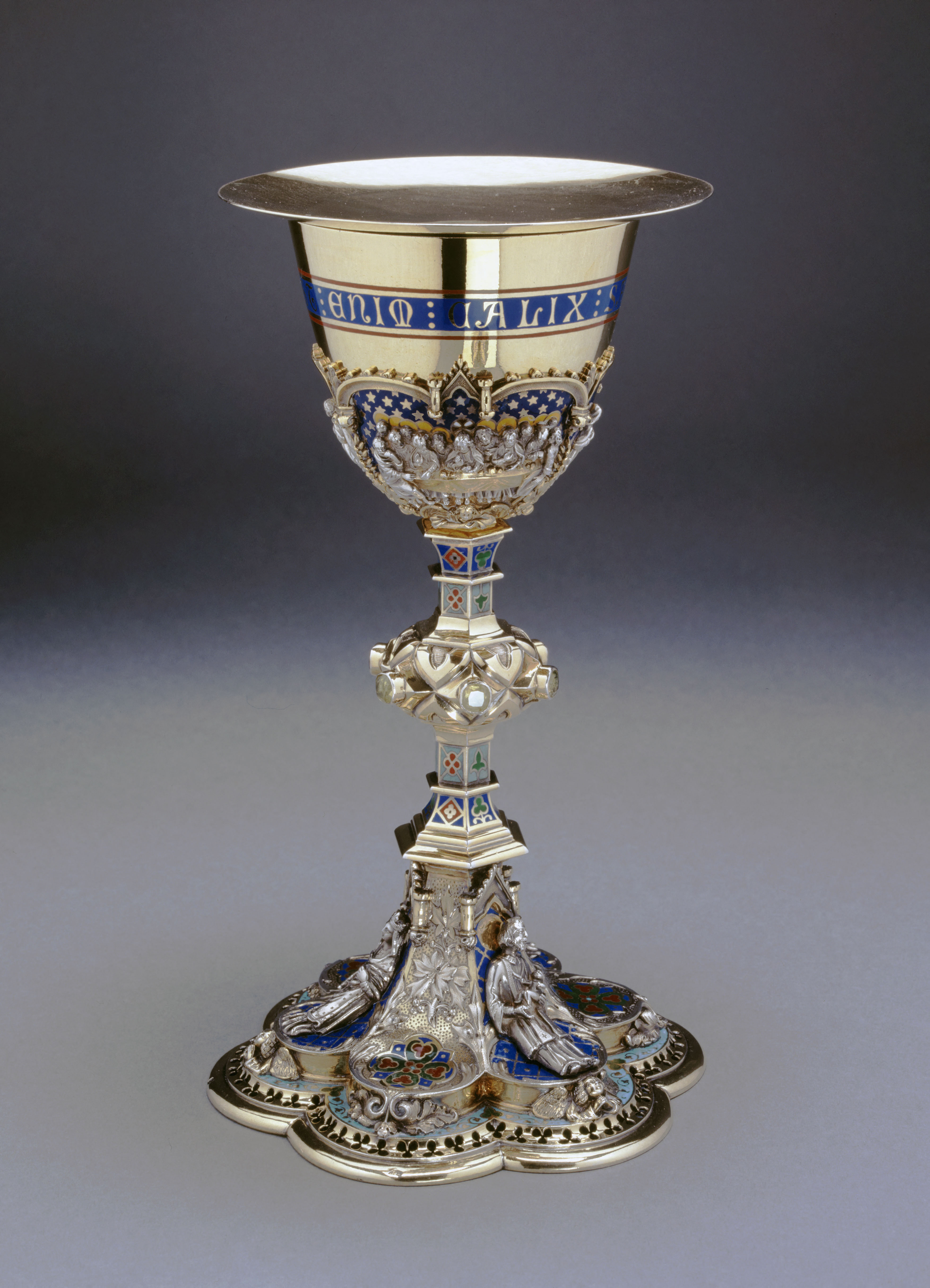
Chalice, by Charles-Eugène Trioullier, 1863-1875, enamelled silvered and stones, Petit Palais

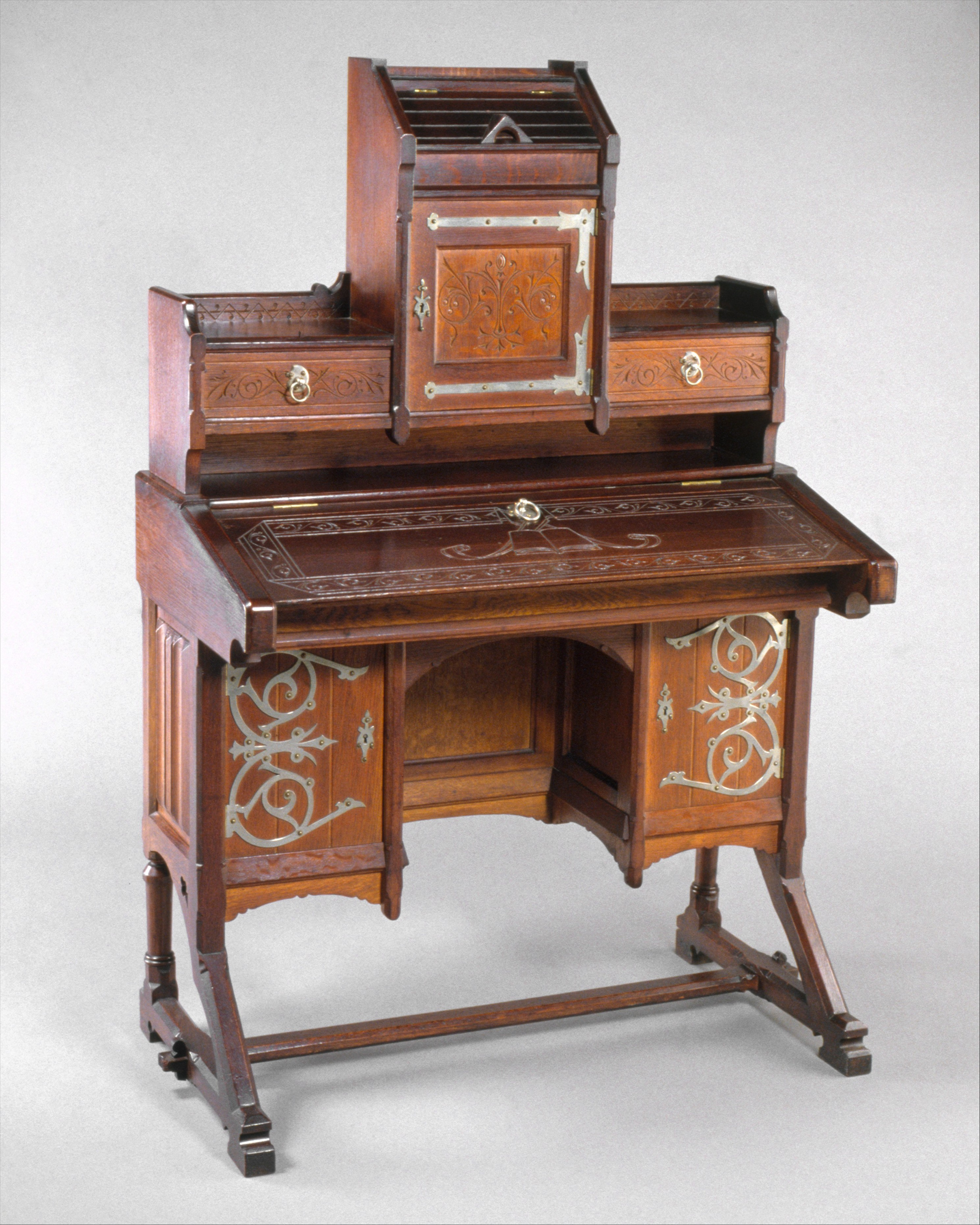
Desk, by Kimbel and Cabus, c.1877, oak, nickel-plated brass and iron hardware, Metropolitan Museum of Art

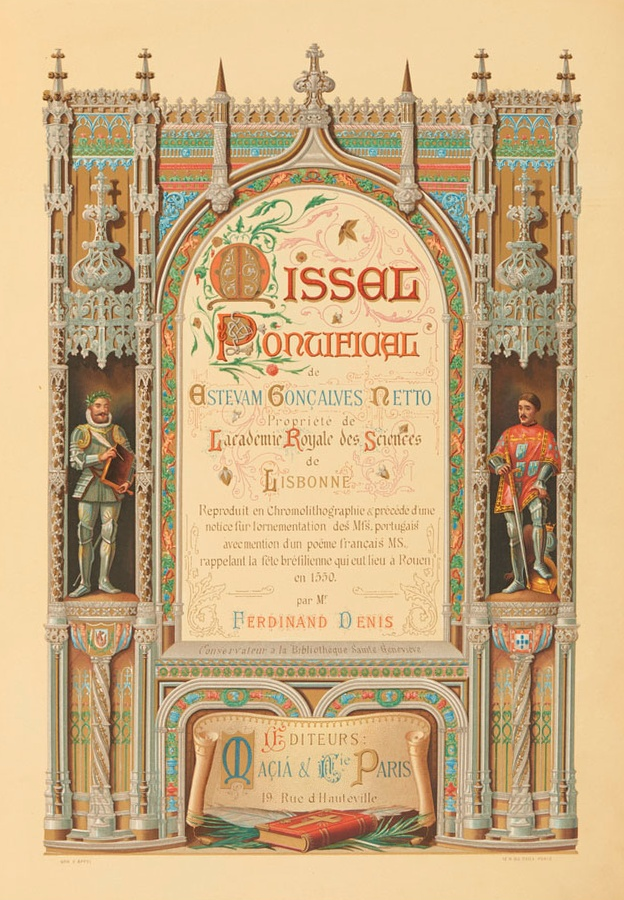
Frontispiece of the Missal of the Academy of Sciences, published by Maciá & Cie, 1879, chromolithographic facsimile, unknown location

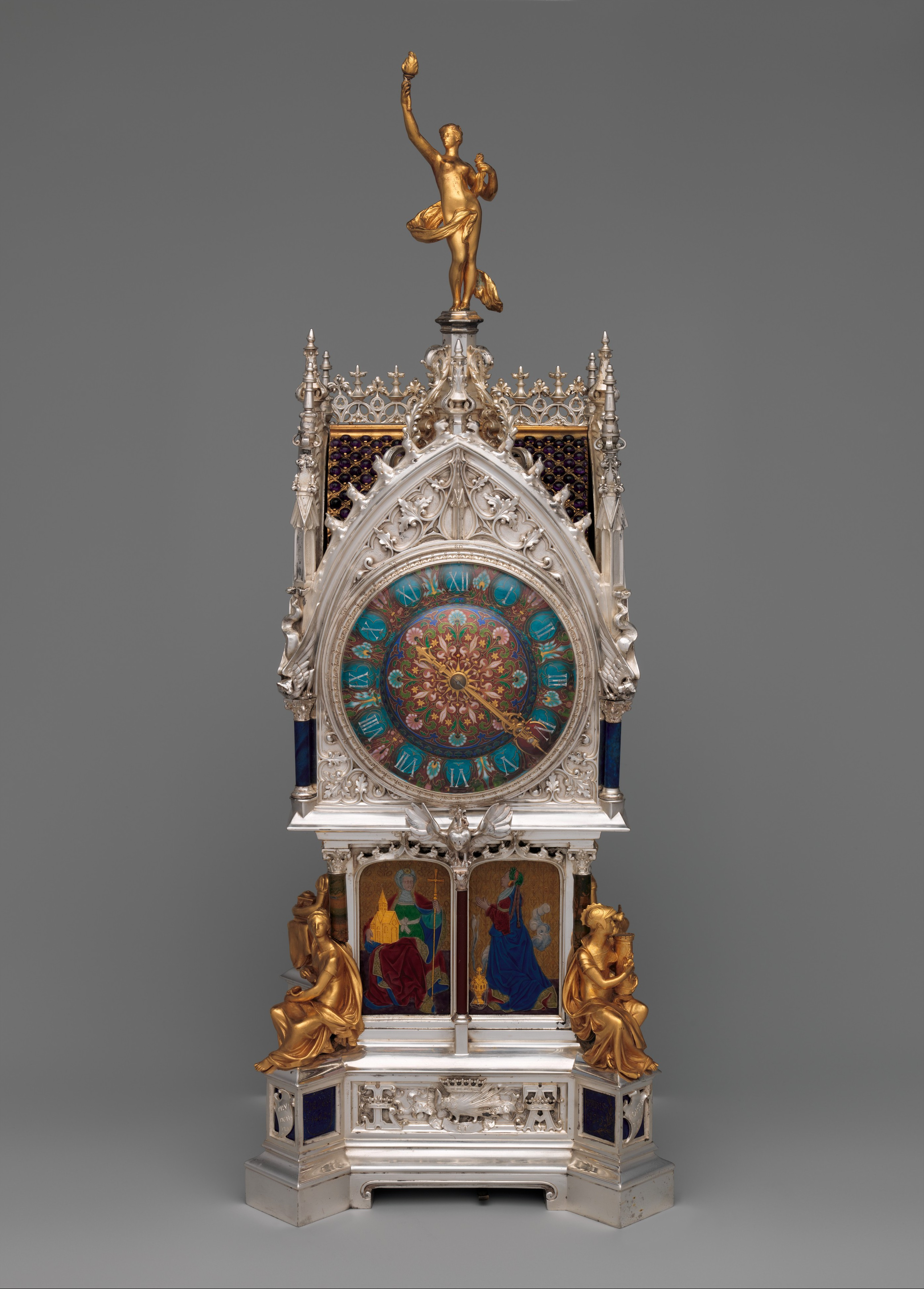
Table clock with calendar, by the Bapst & Falize firm of Lucien Falize, Germain Bapst, Léon Chédeville and the firm of Le Roy et fils, 1881, silver, partly enameled gold, hardstones, rock crystal, amethysts, and diamonds, Metropolitan Museum of Art

== See also ==
- Gothic Revival architecture
- Gothic literature
- Historicism (art)
