= Lumen =

Lumen may refer to:

- Lumen (unit), the SI unit of luminous flux
- Lumen (anatomy), the cavity or channel within a tubular structure
- Lumen (band), a Russian rock band
- Lumen (branding agency), a design and branding company headquartered in Milan, Italy
- The Lumen (Cleveland), a skyscraper in downtown Cleveland
- Lumen (website), a database of Digital Millennium Copyright Act takedown requests
- 141 Lumen, an asteroid
- Lumen Martin Winter (1908–1982), American artist
- Lumen metabolism tracker, a health and wellness product
- Lumen Pierce, a fictional character in the television series Dexter
- Lumen Technologies, telecommunications company formerly known as CenturyLink
- Stellar Lumens, a cryptocurrency and payment network
- USS Lumen (AKA-30), a US Navy ship
- Lumen (dating app), a dating app for people over fifty
- Lumen, an office building in Warsaw, Poland, part of Złote Tarasy complex
- Lumen, an 1887 novel by Camille Flammarion

== See also ==
- Luminal (disambiguation)
