= Abraham-Louis Perrelet =

Swiss horologist (1729–1826)

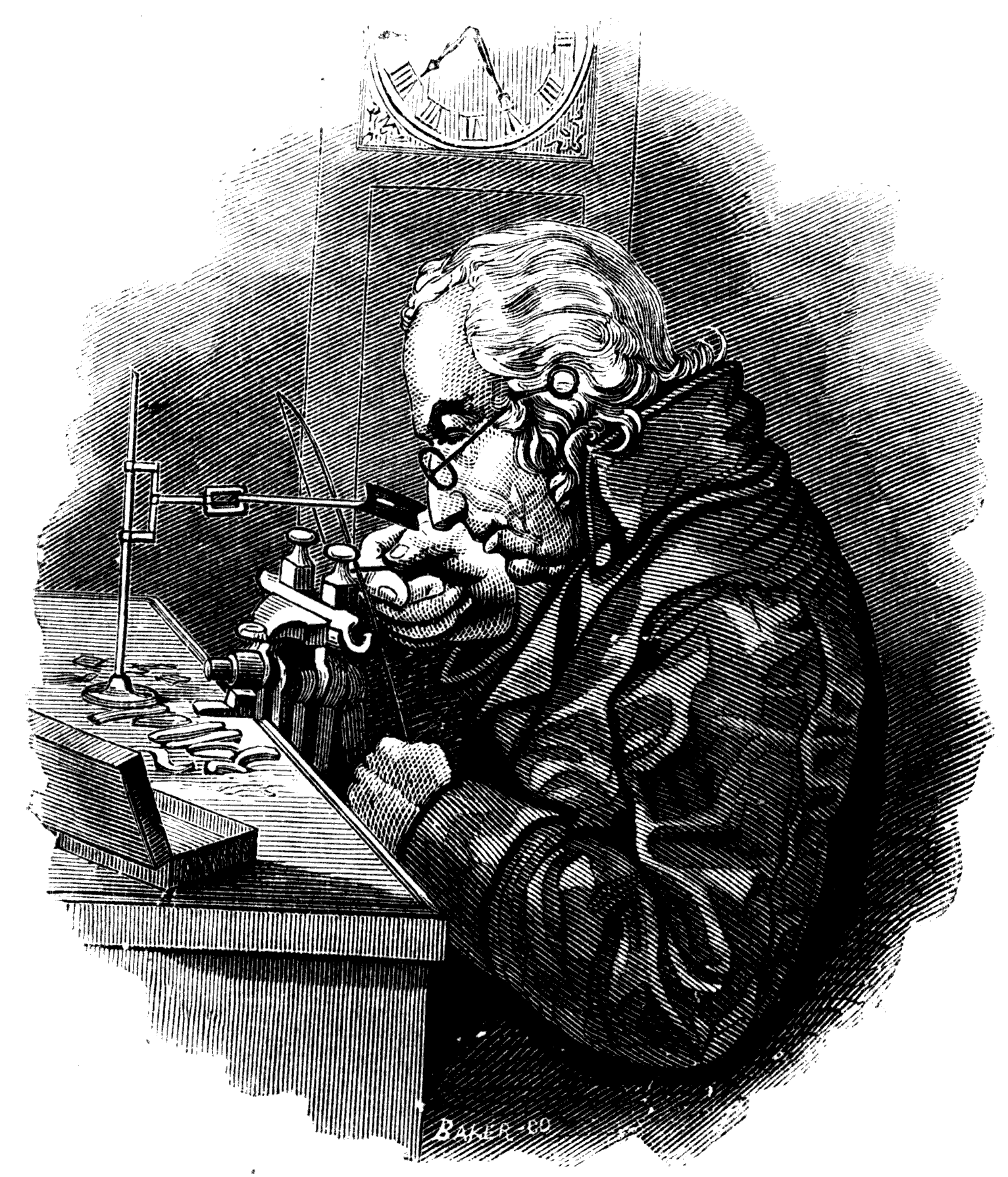
- Born: December 1728; Le Locle, Principality of Neuchâtel
- Died: 4 February 1826 (aged 97); Le Locle, Canton of Neuchâtel, Switzerland
- Occupations: Horologist, inventor
- Notable work: Automatic watch

Abraham-Louis Perrelet (December 1728 – 4 February 1826) was a Swiss horologist.

== Early life ==
Perrelet was born in Le Locle, then in the Principality of Neuchâtel. His father, Daniel Perrelet, was a carpenter and a farmer and as soon as the young man was in a position to do some favours, he helped his parents on the farm. At the age of twenty years he gave up his modest work to learn watchmaking. After an apprenticeship of fifteen days at one named Prince, in Le Locle, who worked little and very badly, and where he learnt absolutely nothing, he started to work independently and so became his own master.

== Self-winding watch ==
About the beginning of 1777, Perrelet invented a self-winding mechanism for automatic watches. It worked on the same principle as a modern wristwatch, and was designed to wind as the owner walked, using an oscillating weight inside the large watch that moved up and down.

The Geneva Society of Arts reported in 1777 that fifteen minutes walking was necessary to wind the watch sufficiently for eight days, and the following year reported that it was selling well. Perrelet is thus widely acknowledged as the inventor of the "automatic" watch. However, his watch probably used a weight pivoting at the side of the movement. The first drawing and accurate description of an automatic watch with a central rotor was created in 1778 by the watchmaker Hubert Sarton and that design is attributed to him. Following the work of Perrelet, other watchmakers also created automatic watches from about 1777 on.

== Breguet ==
Perrelet sold some of his watches to a contemporary watchmaking luminary, Abraham-Louis Breguet around 1780, who improved upon the mechanism in his own version of the design, calling his watches "perpetuelles", the French word for perpetual. They did not work reliably and Breguet stopped producing them around 1810.

== Famous grandson ==
Louis-Frédéric Perrelet (1781–1852), a grandson of Abraham-Louis Perrelet, was trained by his grandfather and went into business in Paris. Louis-Frédéric invented marine watches with measuring instruments and a split-second precision chronograph. He won one of three Lalande awards for 1830.

== Brand ==
Perrelet SA
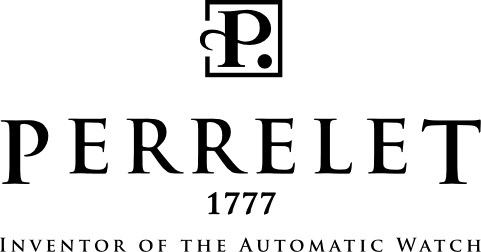
- Type: Private
- Industry: Luxury watch manufacturing
- Founded: 1777 (Abraham-Louis Perrelet - Perrelet.)
- Founder: Abraham-Louis Perrelet
- Headquarters: PERRELET SA Rue Bubenberg 7 2502 Biel/Bienne Suisse, Switzerland
- Area served: Worldwide
- Key people: Miguel Rodriguez, President
- Parent: Festina Group
- Website: perrelet.com

Perrelet SA is a Swiss luxury watchmaker based in Biel/Bienne, Switzerland. Founded in 1777 by Abraham-Louis Perrelet, the inventor of the automatic watch. After his death in 1826 his famous grandson Louis-Frédéric Perrelet followed his footsteps and took the prestige Perrelet name further. The grandson of Mr. Perrelet, Louis-Frédérick Perrelet died in 1852. The company claims that it has been constantly active since and returned to visibility in 1990.

The House of Perrelet develops in 1990, Working on the concept of a Dial-side rotor / Double rotor. Perrelet produced its first Double rotor model in 1995 and filed a patent for the design. The Perrelet name was revived that year with the introduction of the Double Rotor. This timepiece featured a single rotor visible on the dial side and a second one lying beneath it, enabling the wearer to see the mechanism in motion through the front of the watch. The Double Rotor model is Perrelet's most famous timepiece and resulted from a collaboration with AHCI master watchmaker Paul Gerber.

Moving forward the brand had to fight against overpowering competitors. Over the next decade, Perrelet suffered financial difficulties and was relaunched one more time in 2004 by the Festina Group. Acquired in 2004 by Miguel Rodriguez of the Festina Group, appointed Marc Bernhardt as CEO of Perrelet in 2007, and under his direction, the company released a few highly regarded watches. These included watches with retrograde, jumping hour, and double-rotor complications. Introduction of these unique complications was met with resounding success compared to the initial 1995 revival.

In 2009 the first Perrelet Turbine watch was presented. The Turbine model became a massive global success. It took its inspiration from the aviation world, based on a Jet Engine turbine. The successful double rotor movement was reused with a bit of a twist – the oscillating weight on the dial side is a propeller, like a jet engine turbine. The 12 blades of the “propeller” rotate just like a jet turbine, creating a striking visual display. Perrelet also released this popular model for women, first as XS and now the current Lady Turbine.

In the same year Perrelet released an iconic watch for women called the "Diamond Flower" with a slogan "Designed by women for women". equipped with a "double rotor" movement. Set with diamonds and rubies on a "hanging" flower set as the front rotor. This name with age-old overtones is inspired by the history of the hanging gardens of Babylon. With its original Diamond Flower Amytis collection, Perrelet thereby pays tribute to one of the seven wonders of the ancient world and doubtless the most beautiful, while evoking the grace and beauty of Amytis of Media, Queen of Babylon.

The Turbine quickly became a flagship look and model for Perrelet. The introduction of the Turbine model paved a way for many other successful lines and editions based on the Turbine, includes Turbine Chrono, tourbillons, Evo, Pilot and Yacht Diver. Perrelet has since released many specialty and limited edition Turbine models like the popular Poker, Paranoia, Camo and even a Hentai Erotic model with a Backdrop dial featuring adult oriented erotic Hentai images. Every year Perrelet releases a Limited edition Turbine for the Chinese New Year with an backdrop dial featuring an animal representing the Chinese zodiac sign.

Other notable Perrelet watches & Collections: TI (Titanium) Collection, Seacraft Diver collection, Big Central Moon Phase Watch A3013, Maestro 5-Minute Repeater, Flying Tourbillon, Perpetual Calendar, 5-Minute Repeater A3010, Regulator Retrograde, Skeleton Chronograph and The First Class Collection.

=== Movements ===
Perrelets In-House movements and caliber are entirely developed and produced within its workshops. Previously Perrelet had always used ETA base movements for its timepieces. One of its most popular wristwatches, the skeletonized double time zone chronograph, is powered by the Valjoux 7750 base. When the company was acquired in 2004, owner of the H5 group / Festina Group, Miguel Rodriguez, purchased the STM holding group, giving Perrelet links to the movement manufacturer, Soprod. Perrelet can also take advantage of relationships with its sister companies in the Group, such as MM Ineltec, MHVJ and Astral, which produce various components for watch movements.

In 2021 Perrelet introduced its caliber P-331-MH. Perrelet received both COSC certification and the chronofiable certification, issued by the Laboratory Dubois of La Chaux-de-Fonds.

=== Ownership ===
The Festina Group, a private company, headquartered in Barcelona, owns Perrelet. The group also owns L. Leroy, Candino, Festina, Lotus, Jaguar, and Calypso, with a combined annual sales exceeding five million watches a year. Perrelet is based in Bienne, Switzerland, and produces an estimated 30,000 watches annually.

=== Pricing ===
In terms of pricing, Bernhardt positioned Perrelet in the middle of the luxury market, with most of their releases priced between five and ten thousand (US) dollars. Their upper-range watches featuring costlier complications, such as tourbillons or minute-repeaters, typically retailed in the forty to hundred thousand (US) dollar range, with some limited pieces at hundred forty thousand (US) dollars.

== Citations ==
- Watkins, Richard (2013). The Origins of Self-Winding Watches, 1773 to 1779 (PDF).
