= Lumen (branding agency) =

Smith Lumen Srl.
- Company type: Limited liability company
- Industry: Branding, design, advertising
- Founded: 2003
- Successor: Drew Smith
- Headquarters: Milan, Italy
- Key people: Drew Smith
- Website: www.smithlumen.com
- Footnotes / references Drew Smith acquired the company in 2014 changing its name to Smith Lumen

Lumen is a Milan-based multi-disciplined creative and design consulting agency, founded by Pietro Rovatti and Drew Smith in 2003. Drew Smith acquired the agency in 2014, changing the name from Lumen to Smith Lumen.

== History ==
Lumen was founded in 2003 by the Canadian-born Drew Charles Smith, a consumer branding and packaging specialist, and the Italian Pietro Rovatti, a corporate identity and branding specialist. Previously, Smith had been Creative Director at Carré Noir, Robilant & Associati and, eventually, at FutureBrand Gio Rossi Associati, while Rovatti was Senior Art Director at Sudler & Hennessey and later Creative Director at FutureBrand Giò Rossi Associati.

== Growth ==
Lumen's approach was called branding innovation and, according to its founders, this is what made the agency quickly growing internationally, by opening a branch office in London (UK) in 2006 and establishing strategic partnerships in the same year with Mildberry, the first branding network in Russia, and in 2011 with 1.618, a Hong Kong-based branding agency. At its climax in 2011, the agency had 50 employees of 18 different nationalities.

Lumen offered a wide range of services for corporate ad private clients, such as brand strategy, packaging design, corporate & brand identity, brand management, retail design, environmental design, interactive media, point of sale and merchandise design.

== Clients ==
Lumen had worldwide-known clients from multiple business sectors, like Ferrero, AC Milan, Campari, Diageo. Autogrill, Bonduelle, Karl Zuegg, Unilever, Club Med, Illy, Parmalat, Gancia, Sky, Bticino, Barclays, Kellogg's, Heinz, Henkel, Festina and Rolex.

== Awards ==
Some Lumen's works have been awarded due to their style and the use of innovative materials. The project realized for the rum Zacapa Centenario Etiqueta Negra has been focused on the "emotional involvement of the material used in the packaging" (in this case, palm fibers reproducing the motif of the south-American petate on the pack): a reason that prompted the Material Connexion research institute to show the product at the "Materiali innovativi e imprese 2009" exhibition, organized under the patronage of the Chamber of Commerce of Milan at the design museum Triennale di Milano.

A list of the most notable honours the agency received when still was known as Lumen:

Competition	Year	Country	Award Category	Product	Client	Result
Grandprix Pubblicità Italia	2011	Italy	Luxury Packaging Award	Zacapa XO	Diageo	Winner
Grandprix Pubblicità Italia	2011	Italy	Brand Manual Award		Fedrigoni	Winner
Grandprix Pubblicità Italia	2011	Italy	Pharmaceutical Packaging Award	Rilastil	Istituto Ganassini	Winner
Designpreis Deutschland	2011	Germany		Prelius	Compagnia di Volpaia	Nominee
Mediastar	2011	Italy	Internet Entertainment Award	giOXO Digital Entertainment	OXO	Winner
Grandprix Pubblicità Italia	2010	Italy	Beverage Packaging Award	Cinzano Vermouth	Cinzano	Winner
Grandprix Pubblicità Italia	2010	Italy	Luxury Packaging Award	Yacht Club Case	Diageo	Winner
Grandprix Pubblicità Italia	2010	Italy	Corporate Literature Award		Bottega Verde	Winner
Red Dot	2009	Germany	Best of the Best: Packaging Design Award	Prelius	Compagnia di Volpaia	Winner
Grandprix Pubblicità Italia	2008	Italy	Corporate Identity Award		AC Milan	Winner
Grandprix Pubblicità Italia	2008	Italy	Cosmetics Packaging Award	Bio Clin	Istituto Ganassini	Winner
Grandprix Pubblicità Italia	2008	Italy	Publishing Design Award	Gazzetta dello Sport	RCS MediaGroup	Winner
Grandprix Pubblicità Italia	2008	Italy	Best Logo Design Award		Fondazione Cariplo	Winner
Grandprix Pubblicità Italia	2007	Italy	Beverage Packaging Award	Boario	Ferrarelle S.p.A.	Winner
Grandprix Pubblicità Italia	2007	Italy	Food Packaging Award	Canned Vegetables Bonduelle	Bonduelle	Winner
Pentawards	2007	United States	Bottled Waters	Ferrarelle Special Edition	Ferrarelle S.p.A.	Bronze

== See also ==
- Lippincott (brand consultancy)
