= Luminism =

Luminism may refer to

- Luminism (American art style), a current in North American painting
- Light art
- Luminism (Impressionism), a neo-impressionist style in painting
