= Luminosity (disambiguation) =

Luminosity is the total amount of energy radiated by an object per unit time.

Luminosity may also refer to:

- Luminosity (scattering theory), the number of particles per unit area per unit time times the opacity of the target
- Luminosity (yacht), an 107.6 meter hybrid yacht
- Luminosity — Ignite the Night!, a former Cedar Point amusement park show that was shown from 2012 to 2017.
- Luminosity function (astronomy), a function of the number of stars or galaxies per luminosity interval
- Luminosity Gaming, an e-sports team
- Luminosity Entertainment, an Australian video production service

== Other uses ==
- Luminance a measure of light, spectrally weighted per the Luminous efficiency function.
- Luminous efficiency function, in colorimetry, the curve which defines the visual sensitivity of the human eye to light of different wavelengths. In the early 20th century this was briefly referred to as the luminosity function but that use was depreciated to avoid confusion with the term as used in astronomy.
- Luminous flux

=== Games ===
- Luma (video) a gamma encoded signal of the luminance component of an image.
- Lumosity, a series of brain training exercises
- Lumino City, a puzzle game

== See also ==
- HSL color space
