= Le Roy et fils =

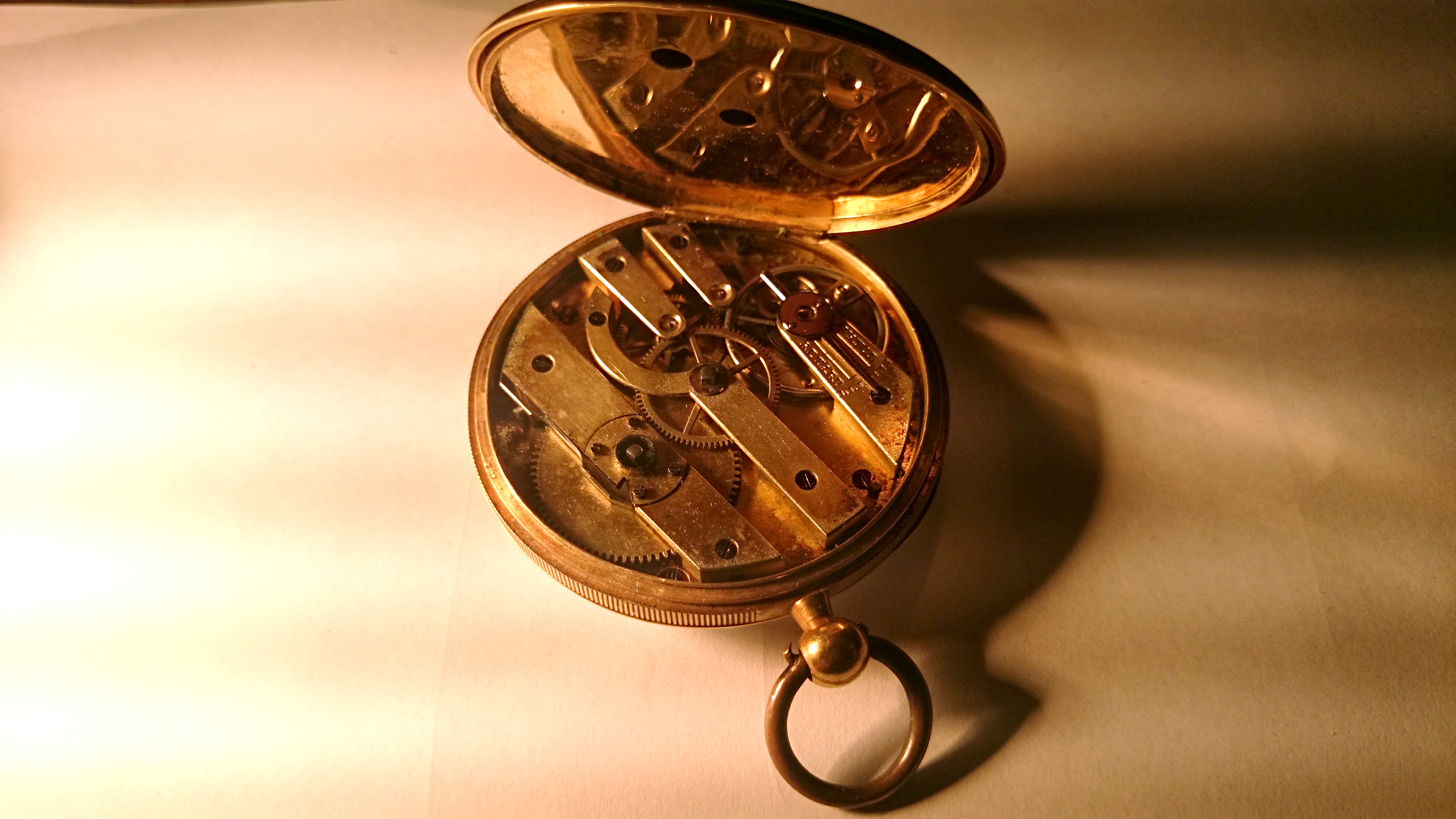
An antique Leroy & Fils pocket watch

Le Roy et fils was a French company making clocks and watches. The company was founded in 1785 by Basile Charles le Roy (1765–1839), who later passed it on to his son, Charles-Louis Le Roy.

Le Roy et Fils became successful and survived the turmoils of the French Revolution. It became clockmaker to Napoleon I, his sister Princess Pauline, Mme Mere and the King of Westphalia. After the restoration of the Bourbon monarchy, it was a warrant holder for the Duke of Bourbon.

A shop was opened in London, in 1854 at 296 Regent Street under the name of Le Roy and Son. The name was later changed to Le Roy and Fils. A second shop was opened in London in 1885 at 57 New Bond Street. Le Roy and Fils was a British Royal Warrant holder to Queen Victoria, and was the only foreign clockmaker that held a British royal warrant.

== Modern revival ==
=== Under Festina management ===
Montres Leroy SA
- Company type: Private
- Headquarters: Le Sentier, Vallée de Joux, Switzerland
- Website: www.montres-leroy.com
