= Luminal =

Luminal may refer to:

- A trade name for the anti-epileptic drug phenobarbital
- Luminal (film), a 2004 film by Italian director Andrea Vecchiato starring Denis Lavant
- In biology, pertaining to the lumen, the interior of a hollow structure
- A misspelling of the chemical luminol, commonly used in forensics
- Luminal (album), 2025 album by Brian Eno and Beatie Wolfe

== See also ==
- Lumen (disambiguation)
