= Festina =

Spanish watch maker

- Company type: Private
- Industry: Watchmaking
- Founded: 1902; 124 years ago in Switzerland
- Founder: Stüdi family
- Headquarters: Madrid, Spain
- Area served: Worldwide
- Products: Watches
- Website: festina.com

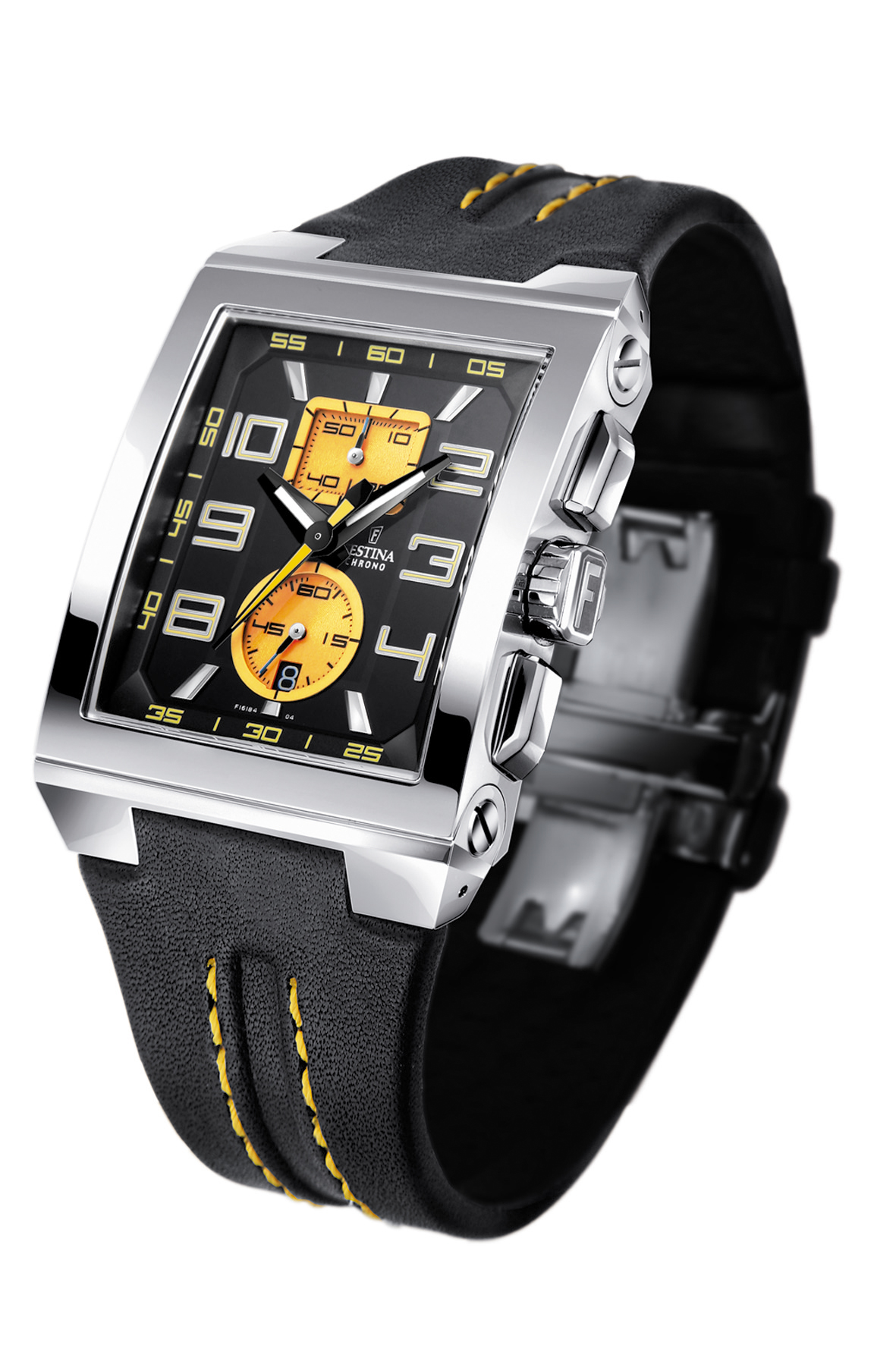
Festina F16184, 2007

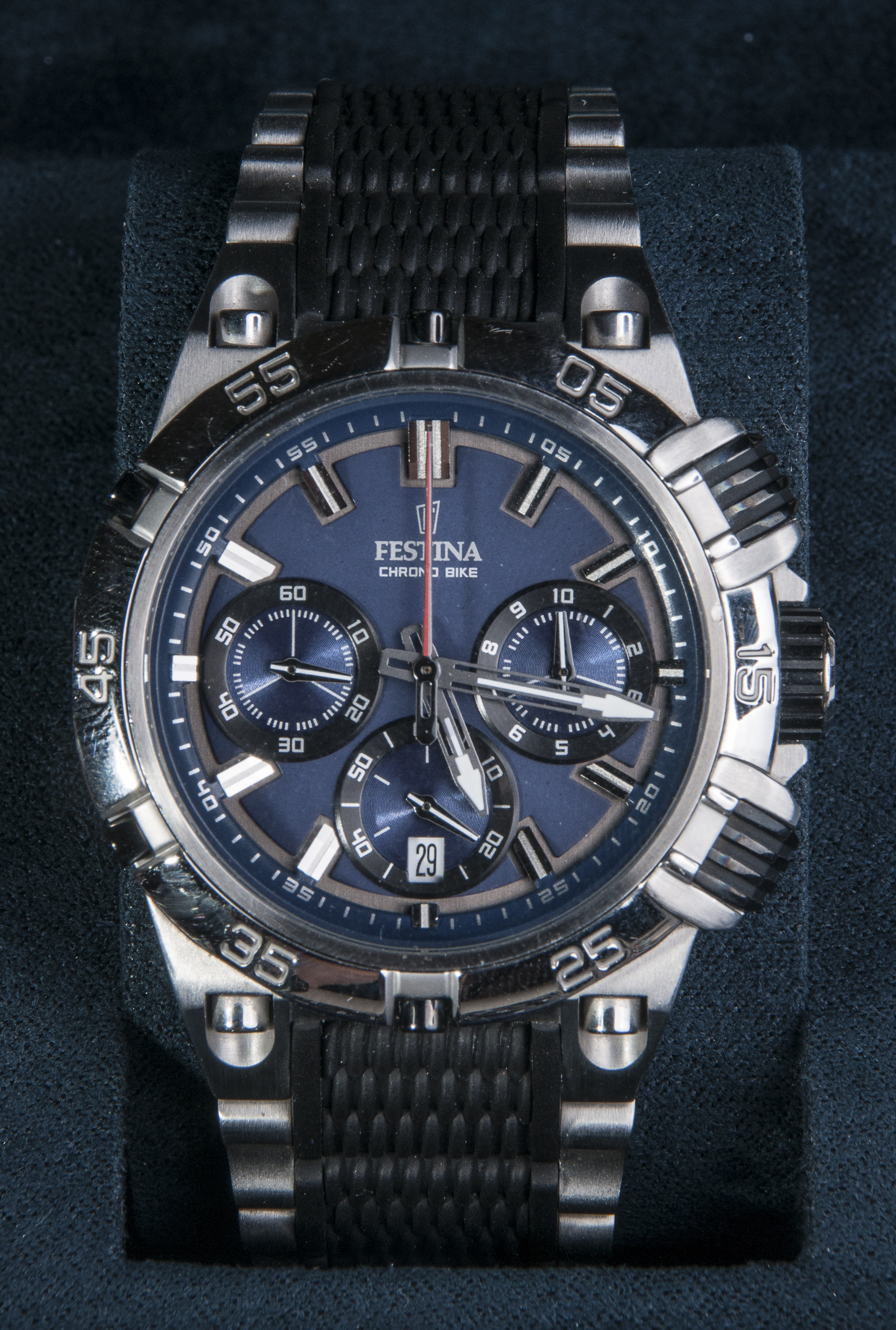
Festina Tour de France, 2014

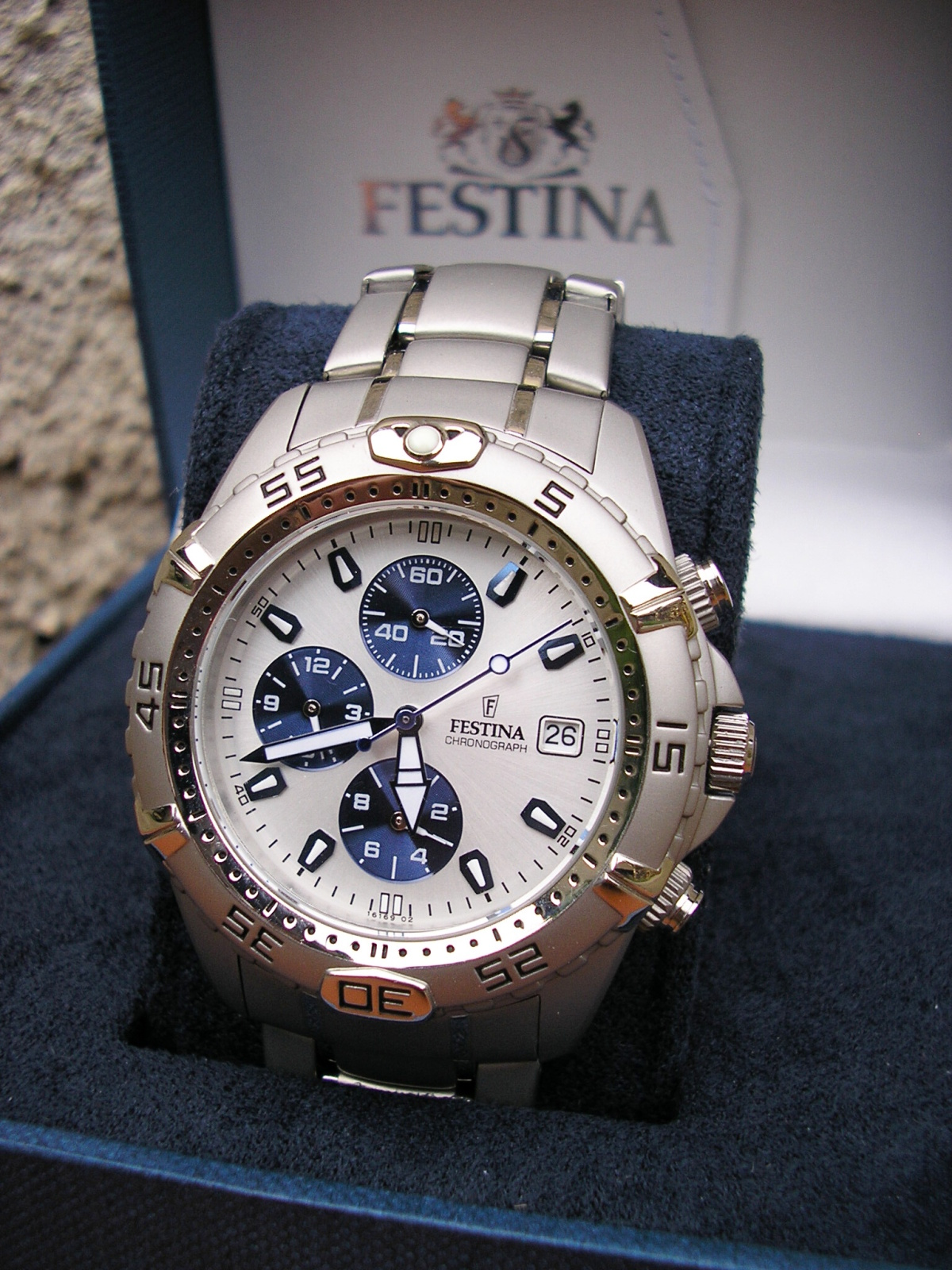
Festina Chronograph, 2009

Festina is a Spanish watch conglomerate. In 1985, businessman Miguel Rodríguez acquired Festina, a brand founded in Switzerland in 1902, thus forming the Festina-Lotus Group.

== History ==
Festina was created in 1902 by the Stüdi family in the city of La Chaux-de-Fonds, in Switzerland. In 1935, the founding family sold the brand to businessman, Willy Burkhard von Wilhelm. During World War II, the business was relocated to Barcelona, Spain.

In 1975, Georges Uhlmann, an entrepreneur who had a significant presence in the Spanish and Italian markets, acquired the firm. In 1984, the Spanish businessman Miguel Rodríguez, from La Linea de la Concepción (Cadiz), acquired the Festina brand and all its rights.

The Festina name is derived from the Latin "Festina lente" which means: "Make haste, slowly", a phrase that, according to Roman historian, Suetonius, is attributed to Augustus Caesar, known for his prudence: "Walk slowly if you want to arrive at a well-done job sooner".

The Festina Group brands Jaguar, Candino and Perrelet are Swiss made. In 2002, Festina acquired the Swiss watch brand Candino.In 2004, Festina acquired the luxury watch brand, Perrelet, founded in 1777 by the prestigious watchmaker Abraham-Louis Perrelet.

== Marketing ==
From 1992 to 2016, Festina was the official timekeeper of the Tour de France, becoming closely linked to the world of cycling as a sponsor / timekeeper of the most important events of the cycling agenda (Tour of Spain, Tour of Britain, etc.).

Festina sponsored the German football club TSV 1860 Munich between 2005 and 2006.

In 2016, actor Gerard Butler became an ambassador for the brand and its campaigns worldwide positioned it in the lifestyle category.

== Festina Group ==
With more than 30 years of history, Festina Group is today an international company specialising in the production of watches and precision parts in a commercial price range.

The Group currently owns seven different brands of watches. Calypso, Lotus, Festina, Jaguar and Candino, and two luxury brands, Perrelet and L.Leroy. Festina also owns two jewellery brands, Lotus Style and Lotus Silver.

The headquarters of the group is in Madrid, with a logistics centre in Barcelona. Its main production centres are in Switzerland and Spain. The Group, which has seven subsidiaries (France, Germany, Italy, Benelux, Switzerland, Czech Republic, Poland and Chile), is present in more than 90 countries on five continents with more than five million watches sold per year.

- Festina
- Candino
- Jaguar
- Perrelet
- L.Leroy
- Joseph Chevalier
- Soprod - manufacturer of Swiss-made mechanical and quartz watch movements
- Manufacture Horlogere de la Vallée de Joux (MHVJ)
- Calypso
- Lotus
- Kronaby
