= Lumen metabolism tracker =

Wellness device

Lumen
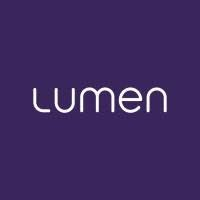
- Type: Health and wellness product
- Manufacturer: Lumen (MetaFlow Ltd.)
- Available: 2018; 8 years ago
- Website: lumen.me

The Lumen metabolism tracker is a product for measuring metabolism, developed and marketed by MetaFlow Ltd., which operates under the trade name Lumen.

== Overview ==
Lumen is a health and wellness technology company founded in 2018 by twin sisters Merav and Michal Mor. The company produces a handheld device that estimates metabolic flexibility via breath analysis. Lumen also provides dietary recommendations based on that through their app. Lumen's headquarters are located in Tel Aviv, with additional offices in New York and London.

Lumen received initial funding through a combination of venture capital investments and a crowdfunding campaign on Indiegogo.

Lumen held another fundraising round in 2022, securing $62 million.

== Technology ==
Lumen's technology is based on the concept of metabolic flexibility, which refers to the body's ability to switch between burning carbohydrates and fats for fuel. The device measures the concentration of carbon dioxide (CO_{2}) in a user's breath, which helps determine the type of fuel being utilized by the body. Higher CO_{2} levels typically indicate carbohydrate metabolism, while lower levels suggest fat metabolism. While metabolic flexibility is associated with fitness level, experts asked by Outside magazine indicated there is no evidence following meal plans to increase it will provide any benefit, and there is no indication it can help achieve weight-loss goals in practice.

=== Scientific evidence ===
Two studies conducted in 2021, both involving researchers employed by MetaFlow Ltd. or serving as scientific advisors to the company, found that Lumen's device could detect changes in metabolic fuel utilization. However, while readings were correlated, Lumen is less accurate. No independent studies have been conducted.
