= Luminous =

Luminous may refer to:

== Music ==
- Luminous (group), a South Korean boy band
- Luminous (EP), a 2004 EP by Cesium_137
- Luminous (John Hicks and Elise Wood album), 1985–88
- Luminous (The Horrors album), 2014
- Luminous, an album by Chris Murphy
- Luminous, an album by Bill Nelson, 1991
- Luminous, an album by Scandal, 2024
- "Luminous" (ClariS song), 2012
- "Luminous" (Jedward song), 2012

== Other uses ==
- Luminous (book), a 1998 short story collection by Greg Egan
- Luminous (novel), 2025 novel by Silvia Park
- Luminous (typeface), a foundry type made by Ludwig & Mayer
- Luminous flame, a flame emitting visible light
- Luminous mind, a term used in Buddhist doctrine
- Luminous Mysteries, meditations on the Rosary in the Catholic Church
- Luminous Productions, a defunct video game developer
  - Luminous Engine, a video game engine
- Luminous: The Symphony of Us, a fireworks-based nighttime spectacular at Disney's Epcot theme park
- Project Luminous, a project by The Walt Disney Company that became the sub franchise Star Wars: High Republic

== See also ==
- Luminance
- Luminescence
- Luminosity
- Lumines, a video game
