= List of FIA GT Champions =

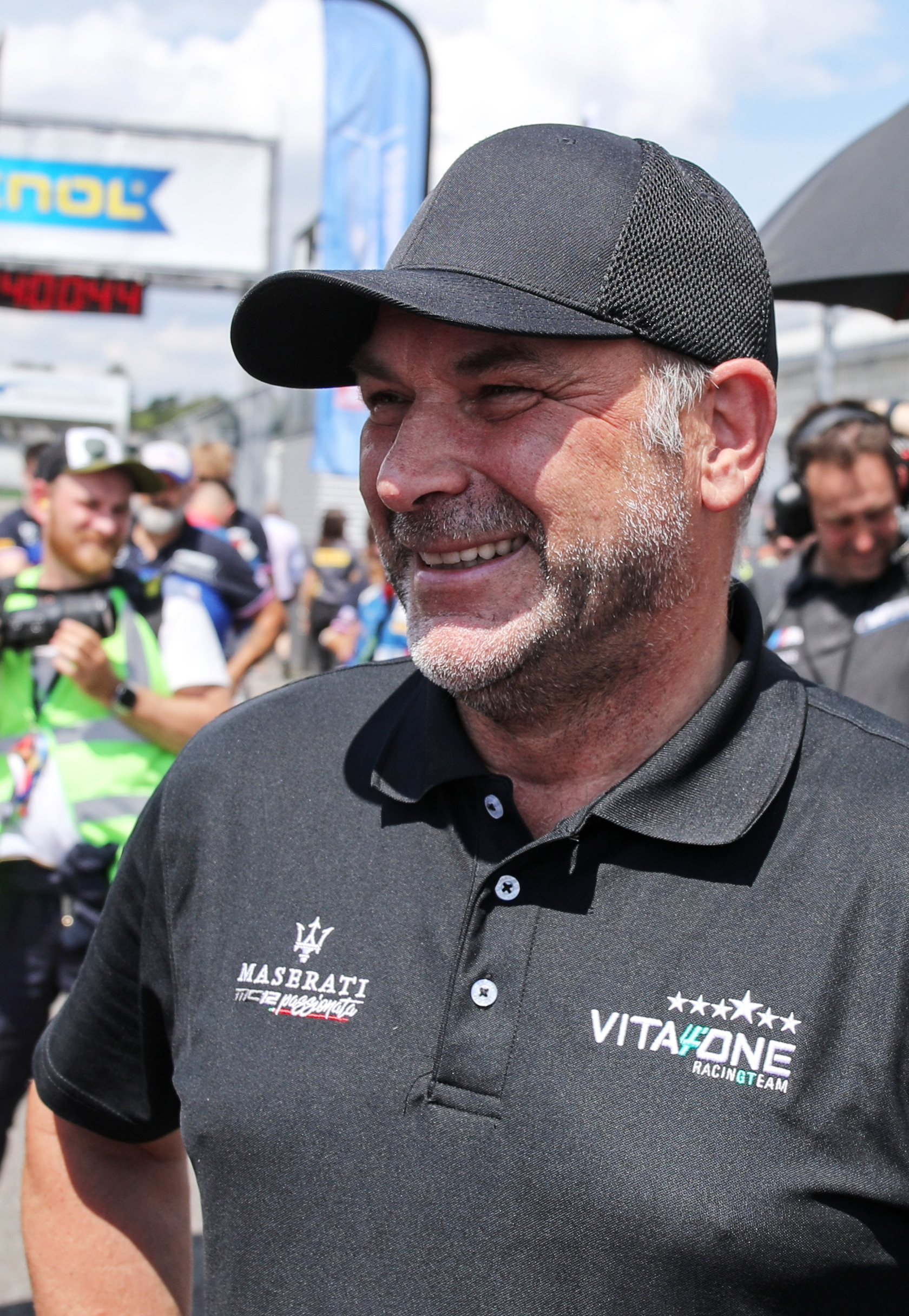
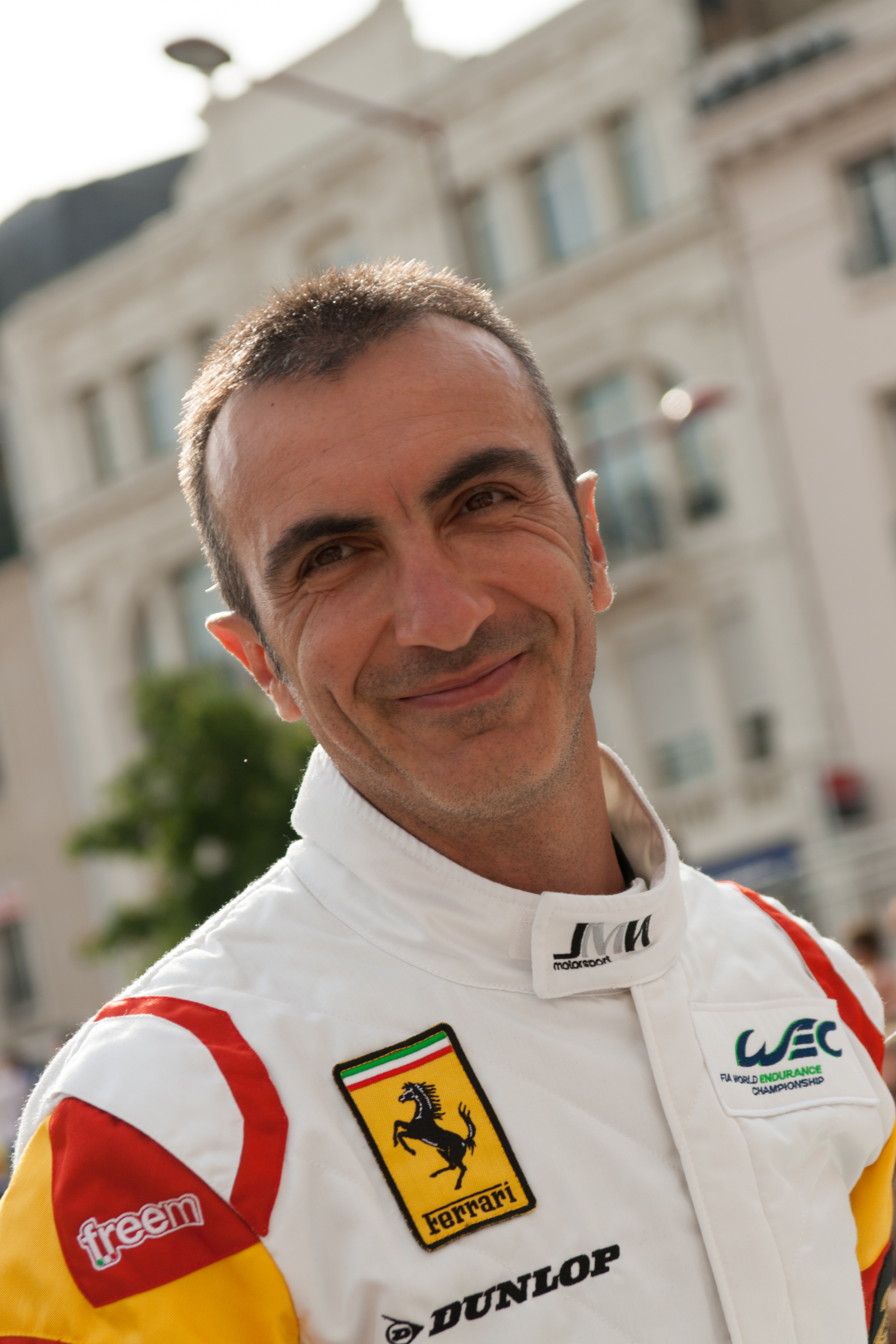
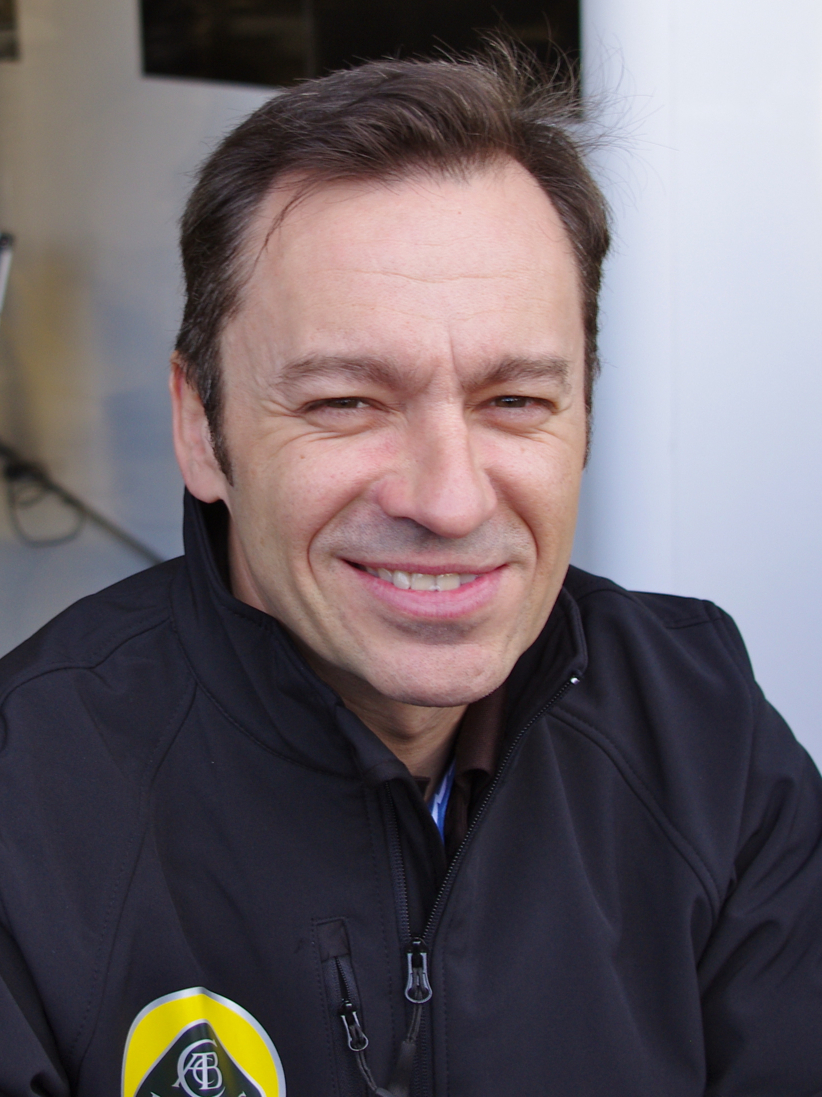
Michael Bartels (left), Andrea Bertolini (centre) and Christophe Bouchut (right) are the three drivers to have won three FIA GT Championship Drivers' titles.

The FIA GT Championship was a sports car racing series for Grand Touring (GT) cars administered by the Fédération Internationale de l'Automobile (FIA), motor sport's regulatory body, and promoted by the Stéphane Ratel Organisation (SRO). It was founded in 1997 by the SRO and FIA vice-president Bernie Ecclestone as the successor to the BPR Global GT Series, and it was the third motor racing championship to bear the FIA name. There were two classes when the series was launched in 1997: Grand Touring 1 (GT1) and Grand Touring 2 (GT2). The GT1 category was dropped following the 1998 season because of rising costs and GT2 was re-branded as GT in 1999. In 2000, the N-GT category was introduced as a secondary category to the GT class. For 2005, the two categories reverted to the GT1 and GT2 titles, and the series was superseded by the FIA GT1 World Championship at the end of the 2009 season.

The series awarded international championships or cups to the most successful drivers, teams, and manufacturers in each of the series' categories over the course of a season. Points were awarded based on individual race results, with the highest tally of points winning the respective championship or cup. Points were awarded to the top six finishers from 1997 to 2002. This was modified in 2003 to allow the top eight finishers to earn points. Bonus points were awarded to participants who had completed six and twelve hours of the Spa 24 Hours race from 2002 until 2008. The highest awards in the series were the FIA GT1 Drivers' Championship and the FIA GT1 Teams' Championship, both of which centered around participants in the GT1 category. The champions were not officially crowned until the FIA Prize Giving Ceremony held in Monaco in December following the conclusion of the season.

At the end of the 2009 season, 30 drivers won an FIA GT title. There were 17 drivers who won a Drivers' Championship in either of the GT1 or GT2 categories and there were 15 racers who won titles in either of the GT or N-GT classes. Michael Bartels, Andrea Bertolini and Christophe Bouchut were the most successful FIA GT Championship drivers with three championships each. In six seasons, only one driver was crowned champion in their category, rather than two, because their regular co-driver did not participate in all of the races. German drivers won more titles than any other nationality with eleven, followed by Italian racers with ten and French drivers with six. Vitaphone Racing Team won the most Teams' Championships in any category with five and AF Corse were in second place with four championships. Ferrari were the most successful car manufacturer in the series with three Manufacturers' Cup titles, ahead of Maserati with two.

== Key ==
Tyre manufacturers
Symbol	Tyre manufacturer
B	Bridgestone
D	Dunlop
MI	Michelin
P	Pirelli

== Drivers' Championships ==
=== GT1 ===
Winners of the GT1 Drivers' Championship
Season	Drivers	Team	Manufacturer	Tyre	Poles	Wins	Podiums	Points	Clinched	Margin	Ref
1997	Bernd Schneider (DEU)	AMG-Mercedes (DEU)	Mercedes-Benz (DEU)	B	5	6	8	72	Race 11 of 11	13	
1998	Klaus Ludwig (DEU)	AMG-Mercedes (DEU)	Mercedes-Benz (DEU)	B	4	5	9	77	Race 10 of 10	8	
1998	Ricardo Zonta (BRA)	AMG-Mercedes (DEU)	Mercedes-Benz (DEU)	B	4	5	9	77	Race 10 of 10	8	
2005	Gabriele Gardel (CHE) (Note: Michael Bartels and Timo Scheider were declared provisional champions after Gardel's car was disqualified by the stewards from the season-ending round in Bahrain. An appeal by Larbre Compétition was upheld by the FIA, reinstating Gardel's GT1 Drivers' Championship win.)	Larbre Compétition (FRA)	Ferrari (ITA)	MI	0	3	6	75	Race 11 of 11	1	
2006	Michael Bartels (DEU)	Vitaphone Racing Team (DEU)	Maserati (ITA)	P	2	3	5	71	Race 9 of 10	9	
2006	Andrea Bertolini (ITA)	Vitaphone Racing Team (DEU)	Maserati (ITA)	P	2	3	5	71	Race 9 of 10	9	
2007	Thomas Biagi (ITA)	Vitaphone Racing Team (DEU)	Maserati (ITA)	MI	3	2	5	61	Race 10 of 10	4	
2008	Michael Bartels (DEU)	Vitaphone Racing Team (DEU)	Maserati (ITA)	MI	0	2	6	70	Race 10 of 10	4	
2008	Andrea Bertolini (ITA)	Vitaphone Racing Team (DEU)	Maserati (ITA)	MI	0	2	6	70	Race 10 of 10	4	
2009	Michael Bartels (DEU)	Vitaphone Racing Team (DEU)	Maserati (ITA)	MI	1	2	5	55	Race 8 of 8	2	
2009	Andrea Bertolini (ITA)	Vitaphone Racing Team (DEU)	Maserati (ITA)	MI	1	2	5	55	Race 8 of 8	2	

=== GT2 ===
Winners of the GT2 Drivers' Championship
Season	Drivers	Team	Manufacturer	Tyre	Poles	Wins	Podiums	Points	Clinched	Margin	Ref
1997	Justin Bell (GBR)	Viper Team Oreca (FRA)	Chrysler (USA)	MI	1	3	10	66	Race 11 of 11	1	
1998	Olivier Beretta (MON)	Viper Team Oreca (FRA)	Chrysler (USA)	MI	2	8	10	92	Race 7 of 10	54	
1998	Pedro Lamy (PRT)	Viper Team Oreca (FRA)	Chrysler (USA)	MI	2	8	10	92	Race 7 of 10	54	
2005	Marc Lieb (DEU)	GruppeM Racing (GBR)	Porsche (DEU)	MI	6	6	9	102	Race 9 of 11	24	
2005	Mike Rockenfeller (DEU)	GruppeM Racing (GBR)	Porsche (DEU)	MI	6	6	9	102	Race 9 of 11	24	
2006	Jaime Melo (BRA)	AF Corse (ITA)	Ferrari (ITA)	P	0	2	7	79	Race 9 of 10	8	
2007	Dirk Müller (DEU)	AF Corse Motorola (ITA)	Ferrari (ITA)	MI	3	6	7	73	Race 10 of 10	6	
2007	Toni Vilander (FIN)	AF Corse Motorola (ITA)	Ferrari (ITA)	MI	3	6	7	73	Race 10 of 10	6	
2008	Gianmaria Bruni (ITA)	AF Corse (ITA)	Ferrari (ITA)	MI	3	5	11	93	Race 8 of 10	32.5	
2008	Toni Vilander (FIN)	AF Corse (ITA)	Ferrari (ITA)	MI	3	5	11	93	Race 8 of 10	32.5	
2009	Richard Westbrook (GBR)	Prospeed Competition (DEU)	Porsche (DEU)	MI	0	4	6	56	Race 8 of 8	2	

=== GT ===
Winners of the GT Drivers' Championship
Season	Drivers	Team	Manufacturer	Tyre	Poles	Wins	Podiums	Points	Clinched	Margin	Ref
1999	Olivier Beretta (MON)	Chrysler Viper Team Oreca (FRA)	Chrysler (USA)	MI	4	6	9	78	Race 8 of 10	25	
1999	Karl Wendlinger (AUT)	Chrysler Viper Team Oreca (FRA)	Chrysler (USA)	MI	4	6	9	78	Race 8 of 10	25	
2000	Julian Bailey (GBR)	Lister Storm Racing (GBR)	Lister (GBR)	MI	5	5	8	59	Race 10 of 10	8.5	
2000	Jamie Campbell-Walter (GBR)	Lister Storm Racing (GBR)	Lister (GBR)	MI	5	5	8	59	Race 10 of 10	8.5	
2001	Christophe Bouchut (FRA)	Larbre Compétition-Chereau (FRA)	Chrysler (USA)	MI	3	4	8	77	Race 7 of 11	35	
2001	Jean-Philippe Belloc (FRA)	Larbre Compétition-Chereau (FRA)	Chrysler (USA)	MI	3	4	8	77	Race 7 of 11	35	
2002	Christophe Bouchut (FRA)	Larbre Compétition-Chereau (FRA)	Chrysler (USA)	MI	0	1	6	49	Race 10 of 10	1	
2003	Thomas Biagi (ITA)	BMS Scuderia Italia (ITA)	Ferrari (ITA)	MI	1	6	7	69	Race 9 of 10	8	
2003	Matteo Bobbi (ITA)	BMS Scuderia Italia (ITA)	Ferrari (ITA)	MI	1	6	7	69	Race 9 of 10	8	
2004	Luca Cappellari (ITA)	BMS Scuderia Italia (ITA)	Ferrari (ITA)	MI	3	4	8	85	Race 9 of 11	10.5	
2004	Fabrizio Gollin (ITA)	BMS Scuderia Italia (ITA)	Ferrari (ITA)	MI	3	4	8	85	Race 9 of 11	10.5	

=== N-GT ===
Winners of the N-GT Cup for Drivers
Season	Drivers	Team	Manufacturer	Tyre	Poles	Wins	Podiums	Points	Clinched	Margin	Ref
2000	Christophe Bouchut (FRA)	Larbre Compétition Chereau (FRA)	Porsche (DEU)	MI	4	6	9	72	Race 8 of 10	29	
2000	Patrice Goueslard (FRA)	Larbre Compétition Chereau (FRA)	Porsche (DEU)	MI	4	6	9	72	Race 8 of 10	29	
2001	Christian Pescatori (ITA)	JMB Competition (FRA)	Ferrari (ITA)	MI	4	5	7	60	Race 11 of 11	3	
2001	David Terrien (FRA)	JMB Competition (FRA)	Ferrari (ITA)	MI	4	5	7	60	Race 11 of 11	3	
2002	Stéphane Ortelli (MON)	Freisinger Motorsport (DEU)	Porsche (DEU)	D	6	7	7	80	Race 9 of 10	24.5	
2003	Marc Lieb (DEU)	Freisinger Motorsport (DEU)	Porsche (DEU)	D	3	3	6	73	Race 10 of 10	5	
2003	Stéphane Ortelli (MON)	Freisinger Motorsport (DEU)	Porsche (DEU)	D	3	3	6	73	Race 10 of 10	5	
2004	Lucas Luhr (DEU)	Freisinger Motorsport (DEU)	Porsche (DEU)	MI	2	6	10	93.5	Race 11 of 11	3.5	
2004	Sascha Maassen (DEU)	Freisinger Motorsport (DEU)	Porsche (DEU)	MI	2	6	10	93.5	Race 11 of 11	3.5	

== Teams' Championships ==
=== GT1 ===
Winners of the GT1 Teams' Championship
Season	Team	Cars	Tyre	Poles	Wins	Podiums	Points	Clinched	Margin	Ref
1997	AMG-Mercedes (DEU)	Mercedes-Benz CLK GTR	B	7	6	13	110	Race 11 of 11	25	
1998	AMG-Mercedes (DEU)	Mercedes-Benz CLK GTR	B	8	10	17	146	Race 7 of 10	97	
1998	AMG-Mercedes (DEU)	Mercedes-Benz CLK LM	B	8	10	17	146	Race 7 of 10	97	
2005	Vitaphone Racing Team (DEU)	Maserati MC12 GT1	P	2	4	13	137	Race 10 of 11	34	
2006	Vitaphone Racing Team (DEU)	Maserati MC12 GT1	P	2	5	11	125	Race 8 of 10	51.5	
2007	Vitaphone Racing Team (DEU)	Maserati MC12 GT1	MI	3	3	9	115	Race 9 of 10	52	
2008	Vitaphone Racing Team (DEU)	Maserati MC12 GT1	MI	0	3	9	122.5	Race 9 of 10	15.5	
2009	Vitaphone Racing Team (DEU)	Maserati MC12 GT1	MI	5	2	9	86	Race 7 of 8	33	

=== GT2 ===
Winners of the GT2 Teams' Championship
Season	Team	Cars	Tyre	Poles	Wins	Podiums	Points	Clinched	Margin	Ref
1997	Viper Team Oreca (FRA)	Chrysler Viper GTS-R	MI	9	7	18	126	Race 10 of 11	43	
1998	Viper Team Oreca (FRA)	Chrysler Viper GTS-R	MI	2	9	16	130	Race 7 of 10	99	
2005	GruppeM Racing (GBR)	Porsche 911 GT3-RSR	MI	11	11	17	180	Race 8 of 11	135	
2006	AF Corse (ITA)	Ferrari F430 GTC	P	0	3	12	140	Race 9 of 10	36.5	
2007	AF Corse Motorola (ITA)	Ferrari F430 GTC	MI	4	9	14	139	Race 8 of 10	75	
2008	AF Corse (ITA)	Ferrari F430 GTC	MI	4	5	15	138	Race 8 of 10	62	
2009	AF Corse (ITA)	Ferrari F430 GTC	MI	5	4	8	88	Race 7 of 8	18	

=== GT ===
Winners of the GT Teams' Championship
Season	Team	Cars	Tyre	Poles	Wins	Podiums	Points	Clinched	Margin	Ref
1999	Chrysler Viper Team Oreca (FRA)	Chrysler Viper GTS-R	MI	5	9	16	137	Race 8 of 10	97	
2000	Lister Storm Racing (GBR)	Lister Storm GTM	MI	7	5	10	72	Race 10 of 10	10	
2001	Larbre Compétition-Chereau (FRA)	Chrysler Viper GTS-R	MI	3	4	9	89	Race 10 of 11	29	
2002	Larbre Compétition-Chereau (FRA)	Chrysler Viper GTS-R	MI	0	1	7	67.5	Race 10 of 10	4.5	
2003	BMS Scuderia Italia (ITA)	Ferrari 550-GTS Maranello	MI	2	8	13	130	Race 9 of 10	59	
2004	BMS Scuderia Italia (ITA)	Ferrari 550-GTS Maranello	MI	6	6	14	159.5	Race 8 of 11	87.5	

=== N-GT ===
Winners of the N-GT Cup for Teams
Season	Team	Cars	Tyre	Poles	Wins	Podiums	Points	Clinched	Margin	Ref
2000	Larbre Compétition Chereau (FRA)	Porsche 911 GT3-R	MI	4	6	10	89	Race 8 of 10	32	
2001	JMB Competition (FRA)	Ferrari 360 Modena N-GT	MI	4	5	7	62	Race 11 of 11	0 (Note: Both JMB Competition and RWS Motorsport were tied on points at the end of the 2001 season. JMB were declared champions because they won five races to RWS's two.)	
2002	Freisinger Motorsport (DEU)	Porsche 911 GT3-RS	D	6	7	9	103	Race 10 of 10	22.5	
2003	Freisinger Motorsport (DEU)	Porsche 911 GT3-RS	D	3	3	7	92	Race 10 of 10	21	
2004	Yukos Freisinger Motorsport (DEU)	Porsche 911 GT3-RS	MI	3	3	13	138	Race 8 of 11	44.5	

== Manufacturers' Cups ==
A Manufacturers' Cup was introduced for the 2005 season and was awarded in both the GT1 and GT2 categories through 2007; it was not awarded in 2008 and was limited to the GT2 class in 2009.

=== GT1 ===
Winners of the GT1 Manufacturers' Cup
Season	Manufacturer	Cars	Tyre	Poles	Wins	Podiums	Points	Clinched	Margin	Ref(s)
2005	Maserati (ITA)	Maserati MC12 GT1	P	4	5	22	239	Race 8 of 11	114	
2006	Aston Martin (GBR)	Aston Martin DBR9	D/MI/P	1	2	10	173	Race 9 of 10	54	
2007	Maserati (ITA)	Maserati MC12 GT1	MI/P	4	4	14	182.5	Race 8 of 10	67	

=== GT2 ===
Winners of the GT2 Manufacturers' Cup
Season	Manufacturer	Cars	Tyre	Poles	Wins	Podiums	Points	Clinched	Margin	Ref(s)
2005	Porsche (DEU)	Porsche 911 GT3-R	D/MI/P	11	11	27	324	Race 6 of 11	283	
2005	Porsche (DEU)	Porsche 911 GT3-RS	D/MI/P	11	11	27	324	Race 6 of 11	283	
2005	Porsche (DEU)	Porsche 911 GT3-RSR	D/MI/P	11	11	27	324	Race 6 of 11	283	
2006	Ferrari (ITA)	Ferrari F430 GTC	MI/P	9	9	28	288	Race 7 of 10	189.5	
2007	Ferrari (ITA)	Ferrari F430 GTC	MI/P	9	9	22	251.5	Race 8 of 10	95	
2009	Ferrari (ITA)	Ferrari F430 GTC	MI/P	6	4	17	150	Race 7 of 8	45	

== Citation Cup ==
The Citation Cup was introduced by the SRO in partnership with Cessna Citation in 2007 for non-professional racing drivers participating in the GT1 category over a series of eight rounds. There was a lack of eligible non-professional drivers throughout the 2008 season, so the FIA moved it to the GT2 class for seven races in 2009.

Winners of the Citation Cup
Season	Drivers	Team	Manufacturer	Tyre	Poles	Wins	Podiums	Points	Clinched	Margin	Ref(s)
2007	Ben Aucott (GBR)	JMB Racing (GBR)	Maserati (ITA)	MI	0	5	8	74	Race 7 of 8	22	
2008	Wolfgang Kaufmann (DEU)	AT Racing (AUT)	Chevrolet (USA)	MI	0	2	2	20	Race 2 of 2	12	
2008	Alexander Talkanitsa (BLR)	AT Racing (AUT)	Chevrolet (USA)	MI	0	2	2	20	Race 2 of 2	12	
2009	Chris Niarchos (CAN)	CRS Racing (GBR)	Ferrari (ITA)	MI	0	2	5	52	Race 7 of 7	4	
