= 2003 Spa 24 Hours =

2003 Proximus Spa 24 Hours

Seasons
- ← 2002 2004 →

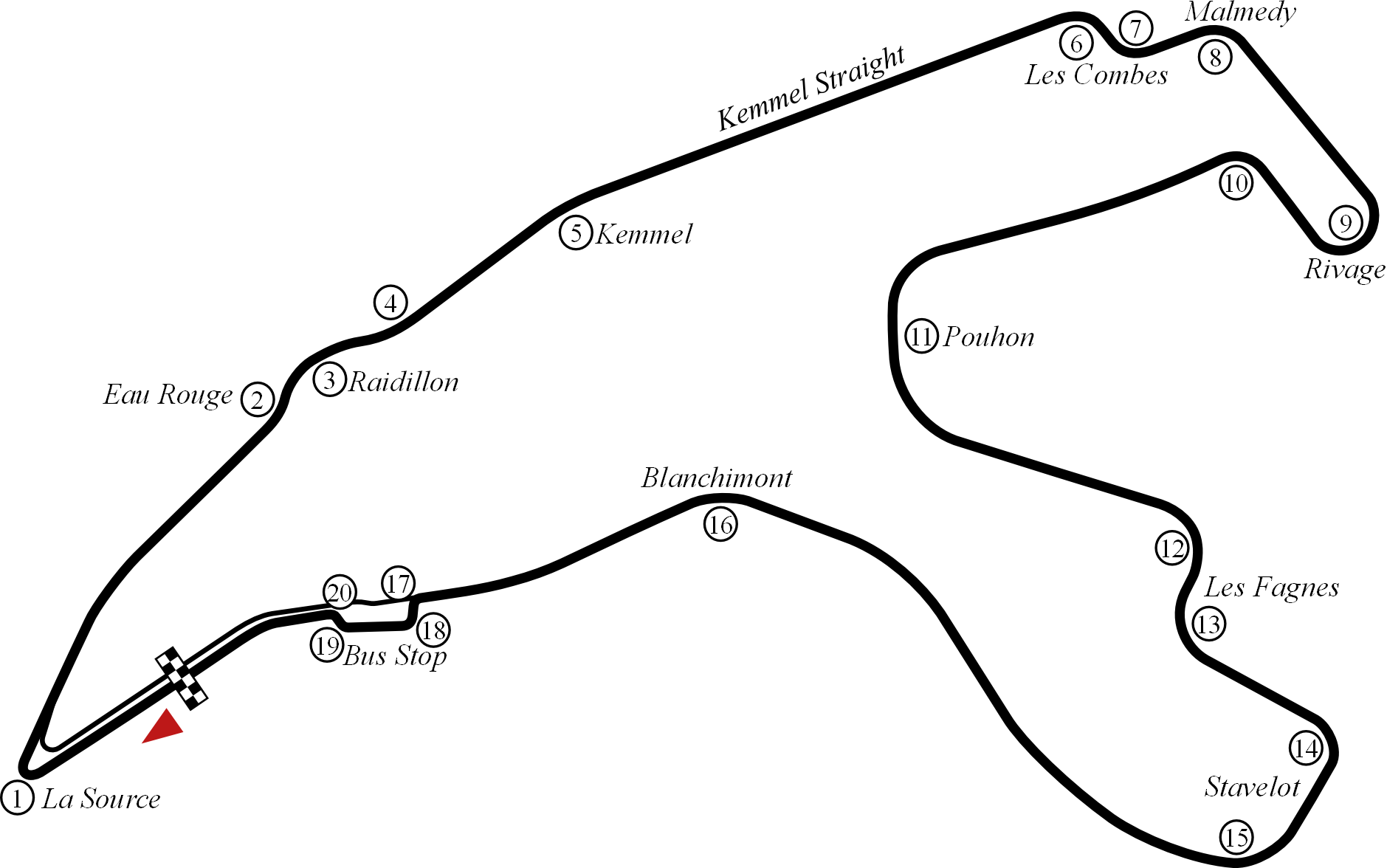
Layout of the Circuit de Spa-Francorchamps (1995-2003)

The 2003 Proximus 24 Spa was the 56th running of the Spa 24 Hours and the sixth round the 2003 FIA GT Championship. This event combined the FIA GT's two classes (GT and N-GT) with cars from national series and one-make series, designated G2 and G3. It took place at the Circuit de Spa-Francorchamps, Belgium, on 25 and 26 July 2003.

This race marked the only time in the history of the FIA GT Championship that the slower of the two classes (N-GT in this case) managed to win a race overall.

== Half-point leaders ==
For the FIA GT Championship, the top eight cars in the GT and N-GT classes are awarded half points for their positions after six hours and twelve hours into the race. Points to the top eight were awarded in the order of 5.0 - 4.0 – 3.0 – 2.5 – 2.0 – 1.5 – 1.0 – 0.5.

=== 6 Hour leaders in GT ===
Pos	No	Team	Laps
1	9	(France) JMB Racing	107
2	1	(France) Larbre Compétition	107
3	22	(Italy) BMS Scuderia Italia	105
4	17	(France) Larbre Compétition	105
5	5	(Switzerland) Force One Racing Festina	105
6	24	(France) Paul Belmondo Racing	105
7	6	(United Kingdom) Creation Autosportif	105
8	15	(United Kingdom) Lister Racing	104

=== 6 Hour leaders in N-GT ===
Pos	No	Team	Laps
1	50	(Germany) Freisinger Motorsport	107
2	61	(United Kingdom) EMKA Racing	106
3	57	(Czech Republic) MenX	105
4	72	(Germany) Seikel Motorsport	105
5	77	(Germany) RWS Yukos Motorsport	105
6	88	(United Kingdom) Team Maranello Concessionaires	104
7	89	(United Kingdom) Team Maranello Concessionaires	104
8	74	(United Kingdom) Team Eurotech	104

=== 12 Hour leaders in GT ===
Pos	No	Team	Laps
1	1	(France) Larbre Compétition	220
2	9	(France) JMB Racing	217
3	24	(France) Paul Belmondo Racing	216
4	15	(United Kingdom) Lister Racing	215
5	22	(Italy) BMS Scuderia Italia	214
6	17	(France) Larbre Compétition	213
7	11	(Sweden) Roos Optima Racing Team	203
8	7	(United Kingdom) Graham Nash Motorsport	195

=== 12 Hour leaders in N-GT ===
Pos	No	Team	Laps
1	50	(Germany) Freisinger Motorsport	220
2	72	(Germany) Seikel Motorsport	216
3	61	(United Kingdom) EMKA Racing	214
4	57	(Czech Republic) MenX	213
5	77	(Germany) RWS Yukos Motorsport	213
6	74	(United Kingdom) Team Eurotech	207
7	53	(France) JMB Racing	203
8	89	(United Kingdom) Team Maranello Concessionaires	203

== Official results ==
Class winners in bold. Cars failing to complete 70% of winner's distance marked as Not Classified (NC).

Pos	Class	No	Team	Drivers	Chassis	Tyre	Laps
Pos	Class	No	Team	Drivers	Engine	Tyre	Laps
1	**N-GT**	**50**	**(Germany) Freisinger Motorsport**	**(Germany) Marc Lieb (France) Stéphane Ortelli (France) Romain Dumas**	**Porsche 911 GT3-RS**	D	**479**
1	**N-GT**	**50**	**(Germany) Freisinger Motorsport**	**(Germany) Marc Lieb (France) Stéphane Ortelli (France) Romain Dumas**	**Porsche 3.6L Flat-6**	D	**479**
2	**GT**	**22**	**(Italy) BMS Scuderia Italia**	**(Italy) Fabrizio Gollin (Italy) Luca Cappellari (Switzerland) Enzo Calderari (Switzerland) Lilian Bryner**	**Ferrari 550-GTS Maranello**	M	**471**
2	**GT**	**22**	**(Italy) BMS Scuderia Italia**	**(Italy) Fabrizio Gollin (Italy) Luca Cappellari (Switzerland) Enzo Calderari (Switzerland) Lilian Bryner**	**Ferrari 5.9L V12**	M	**471**
3	N-GT	72	(Germany) Seikel Motorsport	(Switzerland) Andrea Chiesa (Italy) Alex Caffi (Italy) Luca Drudi (Italy) Gabrio Rosa	Porsche 911 GT3-RS	Y	470
3	N-GT	72	(Germany) Seikel Motorsport	(Switzerland) Andrea Chiesa (Italy) Alex Caffi (Italy) Luca Drudi (Italy) Gabrio Rosa	Porsche 3.6L Flat-6	Y	470
4	GT	1	(France) Larbre Compétition	(France) Christophe Bouchut (France) Sébastien Dumez (Belgium) Vincent Vosse (Netherlands) Patrick Huisman	Chrysler Viper GTS-R	M	469
4	GT	1	(France) Larbre Compétition	(France) Christophe Bouchut (France) Sébastien Dumez (Belgium) Vincent Vosse (Netherlands) Patrick Huisman	Chrysler 8.0L V10	M	469
5	**G2**	**126**	**(Germany) Zakspeed**	**(Belgium) Kurt Mollekens (Belgium) Didier de Radiguès (Portugal) Pedro Lamy**	**Chrysler Viper GTS-R**	D	**468**
5	**G2**	**126**	**(Germany) Zakspeed**	**(Belgium) Kurt Mollekens (Belgium) Didier de Radiguès (Portugal) Pedro Lamy**	**Chrysler 8.0L V10**	D	**468**
6	GT	24	(France) Paul Belmondo Racing	(France) Paul Belmondo (France) Yann Clairay (France) Emmanuel Clérico (Belgium) Pierre-Yves Corthals	Chrysler Viper GTS-R	P	466
6	GT	24	(France) Paul Belmondo Racing	(France) Paul Belmondo (France) Yann Clairay (France) Emmanuel Clérico (Belgium) Pierre-Yves Corthals	Chrysler 8.0L V10	P	466
7	N-GT	57	(Czech Republic) MenX	(Czech Republic) Jaroslav Janiš (Czech Republic) Robert Pergl (France) Yannick Schroeder	Ferrari 360 Modena GT	D	466
7	N-GT	57	(Czech Republic) MenX	(Czech Republic) Jaroslav Janiš (Czech Republic) Robert Pergl (France) Yannick Schroeder	Ferrari 3.6L V8	D	466
8	N-GT	53	(France) JMB Racing	(Switzerland) Iradj Alexander (Italy) Fabrizio de Simone (Brazil) Luciano Burti	Ferrari 360 Modena N-GT	P	461
8	N-GT	53	(France) JMB Racing	(Switzerland) Iradj Alexander (Italy) Fabrizio de Simone (Brazil) Luciano Burti	Ferrari 3.6L V8	P	461
9	G2	102	(Belgium) AD Sport	(Belgium) Koen Wauters (Belgium) Kris Wauters (Belgium) Albert Vanierschot (Netherlands) Jos Menten	Porsche 911 Bi-Turbo	P	457
9	G2	102	(Belgium) AD Sport	(Belgium) Koen Wauters (Belgium) Kris Wauters (Belgium) Albert Vanierschot (Netherlands) Jos Menten	Porsche 3.6L Turbo Flat-6	P	457
10	GT	15	(United Kingdom) Lister Storm Racing	(Italy) Andrea Piccini (Italy) Gabriele Lancieri (Belgium) David Sterckx (United Kingdom) Gavin Pickering	Lister Storm	D	455
10	GT	15	(United Kingdom) Lister Storm Racing	(Italy) Andrea Piccini (Italy) Gabriele Lancieri (Belgium) David Sterckx (United Kingdom) Gavin Pickering	Jaguar 7.0L V12	D	455
11	N-GT	74	(United Kingdom) Team Eurotech (Germany) JVG Racing	(United Kingdom) Ian Khan (United Kingdom) Nigel Smith (United Kingdom) Mark Mayall (Germany) Jürgen von Gartzen	Porsche 911 GT3-RS	D	455
11	N-GT	74	(United Kingdom) Team Eurotech (Germany) JVG Racing	(United Kingdom) Ian Khan (United Kingdom) Nigel Smith (United Kingdom) Mark Mayall (Germany) Jürgen von Gartzen	Porsche 3.6L Flat-6	D	455
12	**G3**	**117**	**(Germany) Land Motorsport**	**(Germany) Christian Land (Germany) Peter Scharmach (Belgium) Loïc Deman (Belgium) Sylvie Delcour**	**Porsche 911 GT3 Cup**	P	**454**
12	**G3**	**117**	**(Germany) Land Motorsport**	**(Germany) Christian Land (Germany) Peter Scharmach (Belgium) Loïc Deman (Belgium) Sylvie Delcour**	**Porsche 3.6L Flat-6**	P	**454**
13	N-GT	66	(Italy) Autorlando Sport	(Italy) Diego Alessi (Italy) Edy Gay (Italy) Maurizio Mediani (France) Michel Orts	Porsche 911 GT3-RS	P	445
13	N-GT	66	(Italy) Autorlando Sport	(Italy) Diego Alessi (Italy) Edy Gay (Italy) Maurizio Mediani (France) Michel Orts	Porsche 3.6L Flat-6	P	445
14	G2	105	(Belgium) De Bokkenrijders (Belgium) RTM Racing	(Belgium) Pascal Nelissen Grade (Belgium) Steve Van Bellingen (France) Nicolas de Gastines	Porsche 911 GT3 Cup	P	443
14	G2	105	(Belgium) De Bokkenrijders (Belgium) RTM Racing	(Belgium) Pascal Nelissen Grade (Belgium) Steve Van Bellingen (France) Nicolas de Gastines	Porsche 3.6L Flat-6	P	443
15	G2	160	(Belgium) Track Promotion (Belgium) Ice Pol Racing Team	(Belgium) Christian Lefort (Belgium) Yves Lambert (Italy) Renato Premoli (Italy) Antonio De Castro	Porsche 911 GT3-RS	D	441
15	G2	160	(Belgium) Track Promotion (Belgium) Ice Pol Racing Team	(Belgium) Christian Lefort (Belgium) Yves Lambert (Italy) Renato Premoli (Italy) Antonio De Castro	Porsche 3.6L Flat-6	D	441
16	G3	110	(France) Alméras Frères	(France) Philippe Almèras (France) Marc Sourd (France) Steeve Hiesse (France) Pierre Martinet	Porsche 911 GT3 Cup	P	438
16	G3	110	(France) Alméras Frères	(France) Philippe Almèras (France) Marc Sourd (France) Steeve Hiesse (France) Pierre Martinet	Porsche 3.6L Flat-6	P	438
17	GT	7	(United Kingdom) Graham Nash Motorsport	(United Kingdom) Mike Newton (Brazil) Thomas Erdos (Portugal) Miguel Ramos (Portugal) Pedro Chaves	Saleen S7-R	D	432
17	GT	7	(United Kingdom) Graham Nash Motorsport	(United Kingdom) Mike Newton (Brazil) Thomas Erdos (Portugal) Miguel Ramos (Portugal) Pedro Chaves	Ford 7.0L V8	D	432
18	G2	106	(Belgium) Excelsior	(Belgium) Patrick Selleslagh (Belgium) Alain Corbisier (Belgium) Marc Vannerum (Belgium) Frédéric Bouvy	Chevrolet Corvette C5-R	D	431
18	G2	106	(Belgium) Excelsior	(Belgium) Patrick Selleslagh (Belgium) Alain Corbisier (Belgium) Marc Vannerum (Belgium) Frédéric Bouvy	Chevrolet 7.0L V8	D	431
19	G3	113	(France) Ruffier Racing	(France) James Ruffier (France) Eric Mouez (France) Éric Hélary (France) Stéphane Pereira	Porsche 911 GT3 Cup	P	431
19	G3	113	(France) Ruffier Racing	(France) James Ruffier (France) Eric Mouez (France) Éric Hélary (France) Stéphane Pereira	Porsche 3.6L Flat-6	P	431
20	N-GT	89	(United Kingdom) Team Maranello Concessionaires	(United Kingdom) Darren Turner (United Kingdom) Guy Smith (United Kingdom) Jamie Davies	Ferrari 360 Modena N-GT	D	426
20	N-GT	89	(United Kingdom) Team Maranello Concessionaires	(United Kingdom) Darren Turner (United Kingdom) Guy Smith (United Kingdom) Jamie Davies	Ferrari 3.6L V8	D	426
21	G3	111	(Belgium) Signa Racing Team	(Belgium) Patrick Chaillet (Belgium) Rafaël Coenen (Italy) Bruno Giovanni	Porsche 911 GT3 Cup	P	417
21	G3	111	(Belgium) Signa Racing Team	(Belgium) Patrick Chaillet (Belgium) Rafaël Coenen (Italy) Bruno Giovanni	Porsche 3.6L Flat-6	P	417
22	GT	5	(Switzerland) Force One Racing Festina	(France) David Hallyday (France) François Jakubowski (France) Julien Gilbert (Switzerland) Steve Zacchia	Chrysler Viper GTS-R	P	412
22	GT	5	(Switzerland) Force One Racing Festina	(France) David Hallyday (France) François Jakubowski (France) Julien Gilbert (Switzerland) Steve Zacchia	Chrysler 8.0L V10	P	412
23	G2	171	(France) Emeraude Racing	(France) Didier Caradec (France) Olivier Baron (France) André-Alain Corbel (France) Gérard Tremblay	Porsche 911 GT3-R	P	393
23	G2	171	(France) Emeraude Racing	(France) Didier Caradec (France) Olivier Baron (France) André-Alain Corbel (France) Gérard Tremblay	Porsche 3.6L Flat-6	P	393
24	G3	118	(Belgium) Campus Automobile	(Belgium) Philippe Menage (Belgium) José Close (Italy) Lino Pecoraro	Lotus Elise	Y	389
24	G3	118	(Belgium) Campus Automobile	(Belgium) Philippe Menage (Belgium) José Close (Italy) Lino Pecoraro	Rover K18 1.8L I4	Y	389
25	GT	11	(Sweden) Roos Optima Racing Team	(Sweden) Henrik Roos (Sweden) Magnus Wallinder (Belgium) Vincent Dupont (United Kingdom) Peter Snowdon	Chrysler Viper GTS-R	D	375
25	GT	11	(Sweden) Roos Optima Racing Team	(Sweden) Henrik Roos (Sweden) Magnus Wallinder (Belgium) Vincent Dupont (United Kingdom) Peter Snowdon	Chrysler 8.0L V10	D	375
26	G2	100	Racing Team Belgium	(Belgium) Sébastien Ugeux (Belgium) Renaud Kuppens (Belgium) Stéphane Lémeret	Gillet Vertigo Streiff	D	360
26	G2	100	Racing Team Belgium	(Belgium) Sébastien Ugeux (Belgium) Renaud Kuppens (Belgium) Stéphane Lémeret	Alfa Romeo 3.0L V6	D	360
27 DNF	GT	9	(France) JMB Racing	(Austria) Philipp Peter (Italy) Fabio Babini (France) Boris Derichebourg	Ferrari 550 Maranello	P	326
27 DNF	GT	9	(France) JMB Racing	(Austria) Philipp Peter (Italy) Fabio Babini (France) Boris Derichebourg	Ferrari 6.0L V12	P	326
28 DNF	N-GT	69	(Germany) Proton Competition	(Germany) Christian Ried (Germany) Gerold Ried (Austria) Horst Felbermayr, Sr. (Austria) Horst Felbermayr, Jr.	Porsche 911 GT3-RS	D	303
28 DNF	N-GT	69	(Germany) Proton Competition	(Germany) Christian Ried (Germany) Gerold Ried (Austria) Horst Felbermayr, Sr. (Austria) Horst Felbermayr, Jr.	Porsche 3.6L Flat-6	D	303
29 DNF	N-GT	61	(United Kingdom) EMKA Racing	(France) Emmanuel Collard (United Kingdom) Tim Sugden (United Kingdom) Chris Goodwin	Porsche 911 GT3-R	D	268
29 DNF	N-GT	61	(United Kingdom) EMKA Racing	(France) Emmanuel Collard (United Kingdom) Tim Sugden (United Kingdom) Chris Goodwin	Porsche 3.6L Flat-6	D	268
30 DNF	N-GT	77	(Germany) RWS Yukos Motorsport	(Russia) Nikolai Fomenko (Russia) Alexey Vasilyev (United Kingdom) Adam Jones (France) Stéphane Daoudi	Porsche 911 GT3-RS	P	240
30 DNF	N-GT	77	(Germany) RWS Yukos Motorsport	(Russia) Nikolai Fomenko (Russia) Alexey Vasilyev (United Kingdom) Adam Jones (France) Stéphane Daoudi	Porsche 3.6L Flat-6	P	240
31 DNF	GT	17	(France) Larbre Compétition	(France) Jean-Luc Blanchemain (Belgium) Vanina Ickx (Italy) Stefano Zonca (Finland) Pertti Kuismanen	Chrysler Viper GTS-R	M	234
31 DNF	GT	17	(France) Larbre Compétition	(France) Jean-Luc Blanchemain (Belgium) Vanina Ickx (Italy) Stefano Zonca (Finland) Pertti Kuismanen	Chrysler 8.0L V10	M	234
32 DNF	GT	25	(France) Paul Belmondo Racing	(France) Claude-Yves Gosselin (France) Olivier Dupard (France) Marco Saviozzi (France) Pierre Ragues	Chrysler Viper GTS-R	P	164
32 DNF	GT	25	(France) Paul Belmondo Racing	(France) Claude-Yves Gosselin (France) Olivier Dupard (France) Marco Saviozzi (France) Pierre Ragues	Chrysler 8.0L V10	P	164
33 DNF	N-GT	67	(Italy) Autorlando Sport	(Italy) Bruno Corradi (Italy) Moreno Soli (Italy) Marco Facchetti (Italy) Giampaolo Tenchini	Porsche 911 GT3-RS	P	162
33 DNF	N-GT	67	(Italy) Autorlando Sport	(Italy) Bruno Corradi (Italy) Moreno Soli (Italy) Marco Facchetti (Italy) Giampaolo Tenchini	Porsche 3.6L Flat-6	P	162
34 DNF	GT	6	(United Kingdom) Creation Autosportif	(United Kingdom) Bobby Verdon-Roe (Italy) Marco Zadra (Netherlands) Duncan Huisman (France) Jean-Marc Gounon	Lister Storm	D	152
34 DNF	GT	6	(United Kingdom) Creation Autosportif	(United Kingdom) Bobby Verdon-Roe (Italy) Marco Zadra (Netherlands) Duncan Huisman (France) Jean-Marc Gounon	Jaguar 7.0L V12	D	152
35 DNF	G2	109	(Belgium) Laurent Van Moerkerke	(Belgium) Laurent Van Moerkerke (Belgium) Marc Schoonbroodt (Belgium) Pierre-Yves Rosoux (Belgium) Bernard de Dryver	Porsche 911 GT3 Cup	D	146
35 DNF	G2	109	(Belgium) Laurent Van Moerkerke	(Belgium) Laurent Van Moerkerke (Belgium) Marc Schoonbroodt (Belgium) Pierre-Yves Rosoux (Belgium) Bernard de Dryver	Porsche 3.6L Flat-6	D	146
36 DNF	N-GT	84	(Germany) T2M – Kaneko	(Germany) Frank Hahn (United Kingdom) Paul Daniels (Belgium) Christophe Geoffroy (Belgium) Wim Coekelberghs	Porsche 911 GT3-R	D	128
36 DNF	N-GT	84	(Germany) T2M – Kaneko	(Germany) Frank Hahn (United Kingdom) Paul Daniels (Belgium) Christophe Geoffroy (Belgium) Wim Coekelberghs	Porsche 3.6L Flat-6	D	128
37 DNF	N-GT	73	(Germany) Seikel Motorsport	(Canada) Tony Burgess (United States) John Lloyd (United States) Philip Collin (Germany) Tim Bergmeister	Porsche 911 GT3-RS	Y	115
37 DNF	N-GT	73	(Germany) Seikel Motorsport	(Canada) Tony Burgess (United States) John Lloyd (United States) Philip Collin (Germany) Tim Bergmeister	Porsche 3.6L Flat-6	Y	115
38 DNF	N-GT	68	(Netherlands) Peter Kutemann (France) JMB Racing	(Netherlands) Peter Kutemann (France) Antoine Gosse (United States) Stephen Earle (Italy) Batti Pregliasco	Ferrari 360 Modena N-GT	P	111
38 DNF	N-GT	68	(Netherlands) Peter Kutemann (France) JMB Racing	(Netherlands) Peter Kutemann (France) Antoine Gosse (United States) Stephen Earle (Italy) Batti Pregliasco	Ferrari 3.6L V8	P	111
39 DNF	N-GT	88	(United Kingdom) Team Maranello Concessionaires	(United Kingdom) Tim Mullen (United Kingdom) Kelvin Burt (United Kingdom) Andrew Kirkaldy	Ferrari 360 Modena GT	D	104
39 DNF	N-GT	88	(United Kingdom) Team Maranello Concessionaires	(United Kingdom) Tim Mullen (United Kingdom) Kelvin Burt (United Kingdom) Andrew Kirkaldy	Ferrari 3.6L V8	D	104
40 DNF	N-GT	52	(France) JMB Racing	(Italy) Andrea Bertolini (Italy) Christian Pescatori (France) David Terrien	Ferrari 360 Modena GT	P	96
40 DNF	N-GT	52	(France) JMB Racing	(Italy) Andrea Bertolini (Italy) Christian Pescatori (France) David Terrien	Ferrari 3.6L V8	P	96
41 DNF	GT	14	(United Kingdom) Lister Storm Racing	(United Kingdom) Jamie Campbell-Walter (United Kingdom) Nathan Kinch (United Kingdom) Robert Schirle (Netherlands) Tom Coronel	Lister Storm	D	93
41 DNF	GT	14	(United Kingdom) Lister Storm Racing	(United Kingdom) Jamie Campbell-Walter (United Kingdom) Nathan Kinch (United Kingdom) Robert Schirle (Netherlands) Tom Coronel	Jaguar 7.0L V12	D	93
42 DNF	GT	16	(Germany) Wieth Racing	(Germany) Wolfgang Kaufmann (Germany) Niko Wieth (Germany) Elmar Grimm (France) Thierry Stépec	Ferrari 550 Maranello	D	87
42 DNF	GT	16	(Germany) Wieth Racing	(Germany) Wolfgang Kaufmann (Germany) Niko Wieth (Germany) Elmar Grimm (France) Thierry Stépec	Ferrari 6.0L V12	D	87
43 DNF	GT	23	(Italy) BMS Scuderia Italia	(Italy) Matteo Bobbi (Italy) Thomas Biagi (Italy) Ettore Bonaldi (Italy) Stefano Livio	Ferrari 550-GTS Maranello	M	81
43 DNF	GT	23	(Italy) BMS Scuderia Italia	(Italy) Matteo Bobbi (Italy) Thomas Biagi (Italy) Ettore Bonaldi (Italy) Stefano Livio	Ferrari 5.9L V12	M	81
44 DNF	G2	104	(France) Perspective Racing	(France) Thierry Perrier (Philippines) Angelo Barretto (Belgium) Michel Neugarten (Portugal) João Barbosa	Mosler MT900R	D	75
44 DNF	G2	104	(France) Perspective Racing	(France) Thierry Perrier (Philippines) Angelo Barretto (Belgium) Michel Neugarten (Portugal) João Barbosa	Chevrolet LS1 5.7L V8	D	75
45 DNF	GT	2	(Germany) Konrad Motorsport	(Austria) Franz Konrad (Austria) Walter Lechner, Jr. (Switzerland) Toni Seiler (Belgium) Eric van de Poele	Saleen S7-R	D	74
45 DNF	GT	2	(Germany) Konrad Motorsport	(Austria) Franz Konrad (Austria) Walter Lechner, Jr. (Switzerland) Toni Seiler (Belgium) Eric van de Poele	Ford 7.0L V8	D	74
46 DNF	N-GT	51	(Germany) Freisinger Motorsport	(Belgium) Bert Longin (Belgium) Jeffrey van Hooydonk (Switzerland) Gabriele Gardel (France) Guillaume Gomez	Porsche 911 GT3-RS	D	52
46 DNF	N-GT	51	(Germany) Freisinger Motorsport	(Belgium) Bert Longin (Belgium) Jeffrey van Hooydonk (Switzerland) Gabriele Gardel (France) Guillaume Gomez	Porsche 3.6L Flat-6	D	52
47 DNF	G2	107	(United Kingdom) Aero Racing	(United Kingdom) Paula Cook (New Zealand) Neil Cunningham (France) Jacques Laffite	Morgan Aero 8R	D	45
47 DNF	G2	107	(United Kingdom) Aero Racing	(United Kingdom) Paula Cook (New Zealand) Neil Cunningham (France) Jacques Laffite	BMW (Mader) 4.5L V8	D	45
48 DNF	G2	103	(Spain) Darro Motor Racing (Spain) SEAT Sport	(Spain) Miguel Ángel de Castro (Belgium) Didier Defourny (France) Christian Lavieille	SEAT Toledo GT	D	38
48 DNF	G2	103	(Spain) Darro Motor Racing (Spain) SEAT Sport	(Spain) Miguel Ángel de Castro (Belgium) Didier Defourny (France) Christian Lavieille	SEAT 3.0L Turbo V6	D	38
49 DNF	N-GT	75	(United Kingdom) Team Eurotech	(United Kingdom) David Jones (United Kingdom) Godfrey Jones (United Kingdom) Mike Jordan (United Kingdom) Mark Sumpter	Porsche 911 GT3-R	D	33
49 DNF	N-GT	75	(United Kingdom) Team Eurotech	(United Kingdom) David Jones (United Kingdom) Godfrey Jones (United Kingdom) Mike Jordan (United Kingdom) Mark Sumpter	Porsche 3.6L Flat-6	D	33
50 DNF	G3	115	(Belgium) JMT Racing	(Belgium) Stany Linnertz (Belgium) Mike Janssen (Belgium) Jérôme Naveaux (Belgium) Olivier Bouche	BMW Z3 M	P	23
50 DNF	G3	115	(Belgium) JMT Racing	(Belgium) Stany Linnertz (Belgium) Mike Janssen (Belgium) Jérôme Naveaux (Belgium) Olivier Bouche	BMW 3.2L I6	P	23
51 DNF	GT	18	(Netherlands) Zwaan's Racing	(Netherlands) Arjan van der Zwaan (Netherlands) Rob van der Zwaan (Germany) Klaus Abbelen (Belgium) Marc Goossens	Chrysler Viper GTS-R	D	17
51 DNF	GT	18	(Netherlands) Zwaan's Racing	(Netherlands) Arjan van der Zwaan (Netherlands) Rob van der Zwaan (Germany) Klaus Abbelen (Belgium) Marc Goossens	Chrysler 8.0L V10	D	17
52 DNF	GT	4	(Switzerland) Force One Racing Festina (Netherlands) Carsport Holland	(Netherlands) Mike Hezemans (Netherlands) David Hart (Belgium) Anthony Kumpen (France) Philippe Alliot	Chrysler Viper GTS-R	P	12
52 DNF	GT	4	(Switzerland) Force One Racing Festina (Netherlands) Carsport Holland	(Netherlands) Mike Hezemans (Netherlands) David Hart (Belgium) Anthony Kumpen (France) Philippe Alliot	Chrysler 8.0L V10	P	12
53 DNF	G2	101	(United Kingdom) Rollcentre Racing	(United Kingdom) Martin Short (United Kingdom) Rob Barff (United Kingdom) Tom Herridge (United Kingdom) Patrick Pearce	Mosler MT900R	D	0
53 DNF	G2	101	(United Kingdom) Rollcentre Racing	(United Kingdom) Martin Short (United Kingdom) Rob Barff (United Kingdom) Tom Herridge (United Kingdom) Patrick Pearce	Chevrolet LS1 5.7L V8	D	0
DNS	GT	21	(United Kingdom) Care Racing (Italy) BMS Scuderia Italia	(France) Jean-Marc Gounon (France) Jérôme Policand (Italy) Nicola Cadei	Ferrari 550-GTS Maranello	M	–
DNS	GT	21	(United Kingdom) Care Racing (Italy) BMS Scuderia Italia	(France) Jean-Marc Gounon (France) Jérôme Policand (Italy) Nicola Cadei	Ferrari 5.9L V12	M	–

== Statistics ==
- Pole position – #22 BMS Scuderia Italia – 2:15.718
- Fastest lap – #14 Lister Racing – 2:19.453
- Distance – 3327.613 km
- Average speed – 138.557 km/h

FIA GT Championship
Previous race: 2003 FIA GT Donington 500km	2003 season	Next race: 2003 FIA GT Anderstorp 500km
