= 2004 Spa 24 Hours =

Endurance car race

2004 Proximus Spa 24 Hours

Seasons
- ← 2003 2005 →

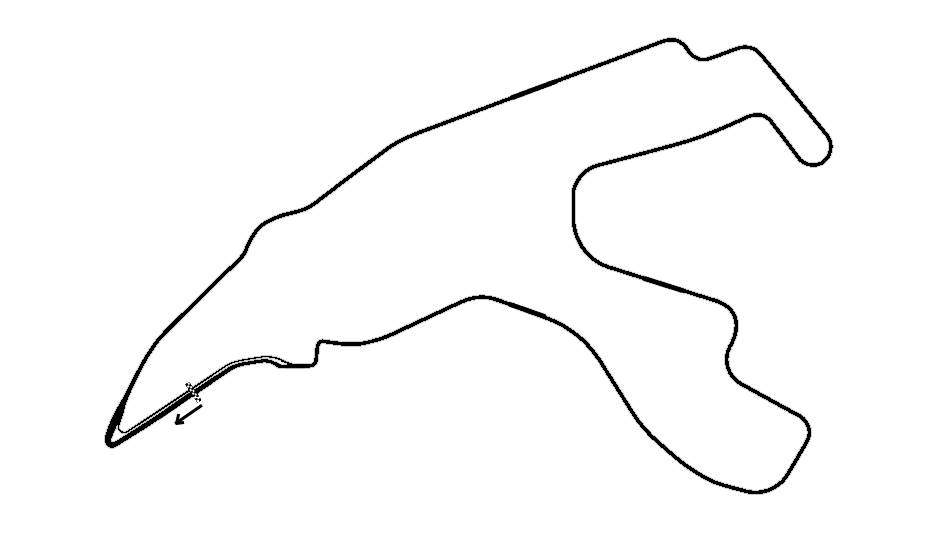
Layout of the Circuit de Spa-Francorchamps (2004–2006)

The 2004 Proximus Spa 24 Hours was the 57th running of the Spa 24 Hours and the seventh round the 2004 FIA GT Championship season. This event combined the FIA GT's two classes (GT and N-GT) with cars from national series and one-make series, designated G2 and G3. It took place at the Circuit de Spa-Francorchamps, Belgium, from 31 July to 1 August 2004.

== Half-point leaders ==
For the FIA GT Championship, the top eight cars in the GT and N-GT classes are awarded half points for their positions after six hours and twelve hours into the race. Points to the top eight were awarded in the order of 4.0 – 3.0 – 2.5 – 2.0 – 1.5 – 1.0 – 0.5.

=== 6 Hour leaders in GT ===
Pos	No	Team	Laps
1	11	(Italy) G.P.C. Giesse Squadra Corse	145
2	1	(Italy) BMS Scuderia Italia	145
3	2	(Italy) BMS Scuderia Italia	145
4	7	(United Kingdom) Ray Mallock Ltd.	141
5	10	(Netherlands) Zwaans GTR Racing Team	141
6	18	(Monaco) JMB Racing	136
7	14	(United Kingdom) Lister Racing	135
8	17	(Monaco) JMB Racing	128

=== 6 Hour leaders in N-GT ===
Pos	No	Team	Laps
1	77	(Germany) Yukos Freisinger Motorsport	143
2	50	(Germany) Yukos Freisinger Motorsport	141
3	88	(United Kingdom) GruppeM	138
4	71	(United Kingdom) JWR	135
5	69	(Germany) Proton Competition	134
6	66	(Italy) Autorlando Sport	133
7	75	(Germany) Seikel Motorsport	132
8	99	(Germany) Freisinger Motorsport	130

=== 12 Hour leaders in GT ===
Pos	No	Team	Laps
1	2	(Italy) BMS Scuderia Italia	286
2	11	(Italy) G.P.C. Giesse Squadra Corse	286
3	10	(Netherlands) Zwaans GTR Racing Team	275
4	1	(Italy) BMS Scuderia Italia	267
5	17	(Monaco) JMB Racing	266
6	32	(Switzerland) Force One Racing Festina	236
7	27	(United Kingdom) Creation Autosportif	226
8	7	(United Kingdom) Ray Mallock Ltd.	220

=== 12 Hour leaders in N-GT ===
Pos	No	Team	Laps
1	77	(Germany) Yukos Freisinger Motorsport	283
2	50	(Germany) Yukos Freisinger Motorsport	280
3	99	(Germany) Freisinger Motorsport	271
4	88	(United Kingdom) GruppeM	269
5	75	(Germany) Seikel Motorsport	268
6	71	(United Kingdom) JWR	267
7	69	(Germany) Proton Competition	261
8	66	(Italy) Autorlando Sport	259

== Official results ==
Class winners in bold. Cars failing to complete 70% of winner's distance marked as Not Classified (NC).

Pos	Class	No	Team	Drivers	Chassis	Tyre	Laps
Pos	Class	No	Team	Drivers	Engine	Tyre	Laps
1	**GT**	**2**	**(Italy) BMS Scuderia Italia**	**(Italy) Fabrizio Gollin (Italy) Luca Cappellari (Switzerland) Lilian Bryner (Switzerland) Enzo Calderari**	**Ferrari 550-GTS Maranello**	M	**558**
1	**GT**	**2**	**(Italy) BMS Scuderia Italia**	**(Italy) Fabrizio Gollin (Italy) Luca Cappellari (Switzerland) Lilian Bryner (Switzerland) Enzo Calderari**	**Ferrari 5.9L V12**	M	**558**
2	GT	11	(Italy) G.P.C. Giesse Squadra Corse	(Austria) Philipp Peter (Italy) Fabio Babini (Finland) Mika Salo (Belgium) Vincent Vosse	Ferrari 575-GTC Maranello	P	557
2	GT	11	(Italy) G.P.C. Giesse Squadra Corse	(Austria) Philipp Peter (Italy) Fabio Babini (Finland) Mika Salo (Belgium) Vincent Vosse	Ferrari 6.0L V12	P	557
3	**N-GT**	**50**	**(Germany) Yukos Freisinger Motorsport**	**(France) Emmanuel Collard (France) Romain Dumas (Monaco) Stéphane Ortelli**	**Porsche 911 GT3-RSR**	M	**545**
3	**N-GT**	**50**	**(Germany) Yukos Freisinger Motorsport**	**(France) Emmanuel Collard (France) Romain Dumas (Monaco) Stéphane Ortelli**	**Porsche 3.6L Flat-6**	M	**545**
4	N-GT	77	(Germany) Yukos Freisinger Motorsport	(Germany) Jörg Bergmeister (Germany) Timo Bernhard (Russia) Alexey Vasilyev	Porsche 911 GT3-RSR	M	543
4	N-GT	77	(Germany) Yukos Freisinger Motorsport	(Germany) Jörg Bergmeister (Germany) Timo Bernhard (Russia) Alexey Vasilyev	Porsche 3.6L Flat-6	M	543
5	N-GT	99	(Germany) Freisinger Motorsport	(Germany) Marc Lieb (Germany) Lucas Luhr (Germany) Sascha Maassen	Porsche 911 GT3-RSR	M	528
5	N-GT	99	(Germany) Freisinger Motorsport	(Germany) Marc Lieb (Germany) Lucas Luhr (Germany) Sascha Maassen	Porsche 3.6L Flat-6	M	528
6	**G2**	**142**	**(Germany) BMW Motorsport**	**(Germany) Jörg Müller (Germany) Dirk Müller (Germany) Hans-Joachim Stuck**	**BMW M3 GTR**	M	**525**
6	**G2**	**142**	**(Germany) BMW Motorsport**	**(Germany) Jörg Müller (Germany) Dirk Müller (Germany) Hans-Joachim Stuck**	**BMW 4.0L V8**	M	**525**
7	GT	1	(Italy) BMS Scuderia Italia	(Italy) Matteo Bobbi (Italy) Stefano Livio (Switzerland) Gabriele Gardel (Spain) Miguel Ángel de Castro	Ferrari 550-GTS Maranello	M	524
7	GT	1	(Italy) BMS Scuderia Italia	(Italy) Matteo Bobbi (Italy) Stefano Livio (Switzerland) Gabriele Gardel (Spain) Miguel Ángel de Castro	Ferrari 5.9L V12	M	524
8	N-GT	71	(United Kingdom) JWR	(United Kingdom) Mike Jordan (United Kingdom) Godfrey Jones (United Kingdom) David Jones	Porsche 911 GT3-RS	D	521
8	N-GT	71	(United Kingdom) JWR	(United Kingdom) Mike Jordan (United Kingdom) Godfrey Jones (United Kingdom) David Jones	Porsche 3.6L Flat-6	D	521
9	N-GT	69	(Germany) Proton Competition	(Germany) Gerold Ried (Germany) Christian Ried (Austria) Horst Felbermayr Sr. (Austria) Horst Felbermayr Jr.	Porsche 911 GT3-RS	D	513
9	N-GT	69	(Germany) Proton Competition	(Germany) Gerold Ried (Germany) Christian Ried (Austria) Horst Felbermayr Sr. (Austria) Horst Felbermayr Jr.	Porsche 3.6L Flat-6	D	513
10	**G3**	**123**	**(Belgium) Mühlner Motorsport**	**(Belgium) Vanina Ickx (Switzerland) Peter Wyss (Belgium) Jean-François Hemroulle**	**Porsche 911 GT3 Cup**	M	**507**
10	**G3**	**123**	**(Belgium) Mühlner Motorsport**	**(Belgium) Vanina Ickx (Switzerland) Peter Wyss (Belgium) Jean-François Hemroulle**	**Porsche 3.6L Flat-6**	M	**507**
11	G3	124	(Belgium) Mühlner Motorsport	(Germany) Helmut Reis (Germany) Heinz-Josef Bermes (Denmark) Kurt Thiim	Porsche 911 GT3 Cup	M	503
11	G3	124	(Belgium) Mühlner Motorsport	(Germany) Helmut Reis (Germany) Heinz-Josef Bermes (Denmark) Kurt Thiim	Porsche 3.6L Flat-6	M	503
12	G2	186	(Belgium) EBRT	(Belgium) Eric Jamar (Belgium) Rudi Penders (Belgium) Jean André (France) Nicolas de Gastines	Porsche 911 GT3-R	D	494
12	G2	186	(Belgium) EBRT	(Belgium) Eric Jamar (Belgium) Rudi Penders (Belgium) Jean André (France) Nicolas de Gastines	Porsche 3.6L Flat-6	D	494
13	G2	100	(Belgium) Belgian Racing	(Belgium) Renaud Kuppens (Belgium) Bas Leinders (Belgium) Sébastien Ugeux	Gillet Vertigo Streiff	D	491
13	G2	100	(Belgium) Belgian Racing	(Belgium) Renaud Kuppens (Belgium) Bas Leinders (Belgium) Sébastien Ugeux	Alfa Romeo 3.0L V6	D	491
14	N-GT	66	(Italy) Autorlando Sport	(Italy) Luigi Moccia (Italy) Moreno Soli (United States) Liz Halliday	Porsche 911 GT3-RSR	P	483
14	N-GT	66	(Italy) Autorlando Sport	(Italy) Luigi Moccia (Italy) Moreno Soli (United States) Liz Halliday	Porsche 3.6L Flat-6	P	483
15	G2	121	(Belgium) Renstal Excelsior (Belgium) Markant Racing	(Belgium) Bert Van Rossem (Belgium) Marc Sluszny (Belgium) Joost Vollebergh (Belgium) Patrick Schreurs	Porsche 911 GT3 Cup	D	483
15	G2	121	(Belgium) Renstal Excelsior (Belgium) Markant Racing	(Belgium) Bert Van Rossem (Belgium) Marc Sluszny (Belgium) Joost Vollebergh (Belgium) Patrick Schreurs	Porsche 3.6L Flat-6	D	483
16	GT	17	(Monaco) JMB Racing	(Austria) Karl Wendlinger (Belgium) Bert Longin (Belgium) Pierre-Yves Corthals (Germany) Alex Müller	Ferrari 575-GTC Maranello	M	480
16	GT	17	(Monaco) JMB Racing	(Austria) Karl Wendlinger (Belgium) Bert Longin (Belgium) Pierre-Yves Corthals (Germany) Alex Müller	Ferrari 6.0L V12	M	480
17	GT	32	(Switzerland) Force One Racing Festina	(Switzerland) François Labhardt (France) Julien Gilbert (France) François Jakubowski (France) Philippe Alliot	Chrysler Viper GTS-R	P	477
17	GT	32	(Switzerland) Force One Racing Festina	(Switzerland) François Labhardt (France) Julien Gilbert (France) François Jakubowski (France) Philippe Alliot	Chrysler 8.0L V10	P	477
18	G2	103	(Belgium) PSI Motorsport	(Belgium) Leo Van Sande (France) Marc Sourd (France) Pierre Martinet (France) Philippe Tillie	Porsche 911 Bi-Turbo	D	457
18	G2	103	(Belgium) PSI Motorsport	(Belgium) Leo Van Sande (France) Marc Sourd (France) Pierre Martinet (France) Philippe Tillie	Porsche 3.6L Turbo Flat-6	D	457
19	GT	13	(Italy) G.P.C. Giesse Squadra Corse	(Italy) Emanuele Naspetti (Italy) Gianni Morbidelli (Belgium) Didier Defourny (Belgium) Frédéric Bouvy	Ferrari 575-GTC Maranello	P	420
19	GT	13	(Italy) G.P.C. Giesse Squadra Corse	(Italy) Emanuele Naspetti (Italy) Gianni Morbidelli (Belgium) Didier Defourny (Belgium) Frédéric Bouvy	Ferrari 6.0L V12	P	420
20	N-GT	73	(United Kingdom) Cirtek Motorsport	(United Kingdom) Adam Jones (United Kingdom) John Grant (United States) Vic Rice (Russia) Nikolai Fomenko	Porsche 911 GT3-RS	D	418
20	N-GT	73	(United Kingdom) Cirtek Motorsport	(United Kingdom) Adam Jones (United Kingdom) John Grant (United States) Vic Rice (Russia) Nikolai Fomenko	Porsche 3.6L Flat-6	D	418
21 NC	G3	116	(Belgium) EBRT	(Belgium) Philippe Menage (Belgium) Sylvie Delcour (Belgium) José Close (Italy) Lino Pecoraro	Lotus Elise	Y	341
21 NC	G3	116	(Belgium) EBRT	(Belgium) Philippe Menage (Belgium) Sylvie Delcour (Belgium) José Close (Italy) Lino Pecoraro	Rover K18 1.8L I4	Y	341
22 NC	GT	18	(Monaco) JMB Racing	(Italy) Andrea Garbagnati (France) Antoine Gosse (Netherlands) Peter Kutemann	Ferrari 575-GTC Maranello	M	154
22 NC	GT	18	(Monaco) JMB Racing	(Italy) Andrea Garbagnati (France) Antoine Gosse (Netherlands) Peter Kutemann	Ferrari 6.0L V12	M	154
23 DNF	GT	10	(Netherlands) Zwaans GTR Racing Team	(Belgium) Stéphane Lémeret (Belgium) Marc Duez (Belgium) Fanny Duchâteau (Belgium) Loïc Deman	Chrysler Viper GTS-R	D	365
23 DNF	GT	10	(Netherlands) Zwaans GTR Racing Team	(Belgium) Stéphane Lémeret (Belgium) Marc Duez (Belgium) Fanny Duchâteau (Belgium) Loïc Deman	Chrysler 8.0L V10	D	365
24 DNF	N-GT	75	(Germany) Seikel Motorsport	(Italy) Luca Riccitelli (Italy) Alex Caffi (Italy) Gabrio Rosa (United Kingdom) Robin Liddell	Porsche 911 GT3-RS	Y	360
24 DNF	N-GT	75	(Germany) Seikel Motorsport	(Italy) Luca Riccitelli (Italy) Alex Caffi (Italy) Gabrio Rosa (United Kingdom) Robin Liddell	Porsche 3.6L Flat-6	Y	360
25 DNF	GT	27	(United Kingdom) Creation Autosportif	(United Kingdom) Jamie Campbell-Walter (United Kingdom) Jamie Derbyshire (United Kingdom) Bobby Verdon-Roe (United Kingdom) Peter Snowden	Lister Storm	D	350
25 DNF	GT	27	(United Kingdom) Creation Autosportif	(United Kingdom) Jamie Campbell-Walter (United Kingdom) Jamie Derbyshire (United Kingdom) Bobby Verdon-Roe (United Kingdom) Peter Snowden	Jaguar 7.0L V12	D	350
26 DNF	G3	115	(Netherlands) US Carworld Racing	(Netherlands) Roger Grouwels (Netherlands) Rob Frijns (Netherlands) René Wijnen (Netherlands) Xavier Maassen	Dodge Viper Competition Coupe	D	323
26 DNF	G3	115	(Netherlands) US Carworld Racing	(Netherlands) Roger Grouwels (Netherlands) Rob Frijns (Netherlands) René Wijnen (Netherlands) Xavier Maassen	Dodge 8.3L V10	D	323
27 DNF	N-GT	88	(United Kingdom) GruppeM	(United Kingdom) Tim Mullen (United Kingdom) Jonathan Cocker (United Kingdom) Tim Sugden (United Kingdom) Warren Hughes	Porsche 911 GT3-RSR	D	301
27 DNF	N-GT	88	(United Kingdom) GruppeM	(United Kingdom) Tim Mullen (United Kingdom) Jonathan Cocker (United Kingdom) Tim Sugden (United Kingdom) Warren Hughes	Porsche 3.6L Flat-6	D	301
28 DNF	G2	108	(Belgium) Renstal Excelsior	(Belgium) Marc Goossens (Belgium) Anthony Kumpen (France) Yvan Lebon (France) Éric Cayrolle	Chevrolet Corvette C5-R	M	295
28 DNF	G2	108	(Belgium) Renstal Excelsior	(Belgium) Marc Goossens (Belgium) Anthony Kumpen (France) Yvan Lebon (France) Éric Cayrolle	Chevrolet 7.0L V8	M	295
29 DNF	G2	143	(Germany) BMW Motorsport	(United Kingdom) Andy Priaulx (Belgium) Kurt Mollekens (Portugal) Pedro Lamy (Spain) Antonio García	BMW M3 GTR	M	278
29 DNF	G2	143	(Germany) BMW Motorsport	(United Kingdom) Andy Priaulx (Belgium) Kurt Mollekens (Portugal) Pedro Lamy (Spain) Antonio García	BMW 4.0L V8	M	278
30 DNF	N-GT	70	(United Kingdom) Graham Nash Motorsport	(Italy) Edy Gay (Belgium) Armand Fumal (Belgium) Steve Van Bellingen (France) Michel Orts	Porsche 911 GT3-R	D	221
30 DNF	N-GT	70	(United Kingdom) Graham Nash Motorsport	(Italy) Edy Gay (Belgium) Armand Fumal (Belgium) Steve Van Bellingen (France) Michel Orts	Porsche 3.6L Flat-6	D	221
31 DNF	GT	7	(United Kingdom) Ray Mallock Ltd.	(United Kingdom) Mike Newton (United Kingdom) Chris Goodwin (Brazil) Thomas Erdos (Portugal) Miguel Ramos	Saleen S7-R	D	220
31 DNF	GT	7	(United Kingdom) Ray Mallock Ltd.	(United Kingdom) Mike Newton (United Kingdom) Chris Goodwin (Brazil) Thomas Erdos (Portugal) Miguel Ramos	Ford 7.0L V8	D	220
32 DNF	GT	14	(United Kingdom) Lister Racing	(United Kingdom) Gregor Fisken (United Kingdom) Ian Donaldson (United Kingdom) Robert Schirle	Lister Storm	D	216
32 DNF	GT	14	(United Kingdom) Lister Racing	(United Kingdom) Gregor Fisken (United Kingdom) Ian Donaldson (United Kingdom) Robert Schirle	Jaguar 7.0L V12	D	216
33 DNF	GT	28	(United Kingdom) Graham Nash Motorsport	(Italy) Paolo Ruberti (Italy) Gian Maria Gabbiani (Belgium) Christophe Geoffroy (Russia) Sergei Zlobin	Saleen S7-R	D	110
33 DNF	GT	28	(United Kingdom) Graham Nash Motorsport	(Italy) Paolo Ruberti (Italy) Gian Maria Gabbiani (Belgium) Christophe Geoffroy (Russia) Sergei Zlobin	Ford 7.0L V8	D	110
34 DNF	G3	111	(Belgium) Signa Racing	(Belgium) Patrick Chaillet (Belgium) Rafaël Coenen (Italy) Giovanni Bruno	Porsche 911 GT3 Cup	P	93
34 DNF	G3	111	(Belgium) Signa Racing	(Belgium) Patrick Chaillet (Belgium) Rafaël Coenen (Italy) Giovanni Bruno	Porsche 3.6L Flat-6	P	93
35 DNF	GT	5	(Germany) Vitaphone Racing Team (Germany) Konrad Motorsport	(Germany) Michael Bartels (Germany) Uwe Alzen (Austria) Franz Konrad (Belgium) Eric van de Poele	Saleen S7-R	P	78
35 DNF	GT	5	(Germany) Vitaphone Racing Team (Germany) Konrad Motorsport	(Germany) Michael Bartels (Germany) Uwe Alzen (Austria) Franz Konrad (Belgium) Eric van de Poele	Ford 7.0L V8	P	78
36 DNF	GT	8	(United Kingdom) Ray Mallock Ltd.	(United Kingdom) Michael Mallock (United Kingdom) Ray Mallock (United Kingdom) Adam Wiseberg	Saleen S7-R	D	50
36 DNF	GT	8	(United Kingdom) Ray Mallock Ltd.	(United Kingdom) Michael Mallock (United Kingdom) Ray Mallock (United Kingdom) Adam Wiseberg	Ford 7.0L V8	D	50
37 DNF	N-GT	85	(United Kingdom) RJN Motorsport	(United Kingdom) Chris Buncombe (New Zealand) Neil Cunningham (Sweden) Carl Rosenblad (Belgium) Vincent Radermecker	Nissan 350Z	D	49
37 DNF	N-GT	85	(United Kingdom) RJN Motorsport	(United Kingdom) Chris Buncombe (New Zealand) Neil Cunningham (Sweden) Carl Rosenblad (Belgium) Vincent Radermecker	Nissan VQ35 3.5L V6	D	49
38 DNF	GT	4	(Germany) Konrad Motorsport	(United Kingdom) Paul Knapfield (Austria) Walter Lechner Jr. (Austria) Wolfgang Treml (Switzerland) Toni Seiler	Saleen S7-R	P	43
38 DNF	GT	4	(Germany) Konrad Motorsport	(United Kingdom) Paul Knapfield (Austria) Walter Lechner Jr. (Austria) Wolfgang Treml (Switzerland) Toni Seiler	Ford 7.0L V8	P	43
39 DNF	G2	105	(France) Emeraude Racing	(France) Olivier Baron (France) Christophe Bigourie (France) Gérard Tremblay (France) André-Alain Corbel	Porsche 911 GT3-R	D	35
39 DNF	G2	105	(France) Emeraude Racing	(France) Olivier Baron (France) Christophe Bigourie (France) Gérard Tremblay (France) André-Alain Corbel	Porsche 3.6L Flat-6	D	35
40 DNF	G2	101	(Belgium) Ice Pol Racing Team	(Belgium) Yves Lambert (Belgium) Christian Lefort (Belgium) Jean-Pierre van de Wauwer	Gillet Vertigo Streiff	D	23
40 DNF	G2	101	(Belgium) Ice Pol Racing Team	(Belgium) Yves Lambert (Belgium) Christian Lefort (Belgium) Jean-Pierre van de Wauwer	Alfa Romeo 3.4L V6	D	23
41 DNF	N-GT	62	(Italy) G.P.C. Giesse Squadra Corse	(Italy) Fabrizio de Simone (Italy) Christian Pescatori (Italy) Andrea Bertolini	Ferrari 360 Modena GTC	P	7
41 DNF	N-GT	62	(Italy) G.P.C. Giesse Squadra Corse	(Italy) Fabrizio de Simone (Italy) Christian Pescatori (Italy) Andrea Bertolini	Ferrari 3.6L V8	P	7
42 DNF	GT	9	(Netherlands) Zwaans GTR Racing Team	(Belgium) Val Hillebrand (Sweden) Henrik Roos (Netherlands) Rob van der Zwaan (Netherlands) Arjan van der Zwaan	Chrysler Viper GTS-R	D	0
42 DNF	GT	9	(Netherlands) Zwaans GTR Racing Team	(Belgium) Val Hillebrand (Sweden) Henrik Roos (Netherlands) Rob van der Zwaan (Netherlands) Arjan van der Zwaan	Chrysler 8.0L V10	D	0
DNS	N-GT	72	(United Kingdom) Cirtek Motorsport	(United Kingdom) Frank Mountain (New Zealand) Rob Wilson (Italy) Maurizio Fabris (Saudi Arabia) Karim Ojjeh	Ferrari 360 Modena GTC	D	–
DNS	N-GT	72	(United Kingdom) Cirtek Motorsport	(United Kingdom) Frank Mountain (New Zealand) Rob Wilson (Italy) Maurizio Fabris (Saudi Arabia) Karim Ojjeh	Ferrari 3.6L V8	D	–
DNS	G2	104	(Belgium) PSI Motorsport	(Germany) Wolfgang Kaufmann (Netherlands) Jos Menten (Finland) Markus Palttala (France) Romain Bera	Porsche 911 Bi-Turbo	D	–
DNS	G2	104	(Belgium) PSI Motorsport	(Germany) Wolfgang Kaufmann (Netherlands) Jos Menten (Finland) Markus Palttala (France) Romain Bera	Porsche 3.6L Turbo Flat-6	D	–

== Statistics ==
- Pole position – #2 BMS Scuderia Italia – 2:15.047
- Fastest lap – #13 G.P.C. Giesse Squadra Corse – 2:18.111
- Average speed – 161.974 km/h

FIA GT Championship
Previous race: 2004 FIA GT Donington 500km	2004 season	Next race: 2004 FIA GT Imola 500km
