= Luca Cappellari =

Italian racing driver (born 1963)

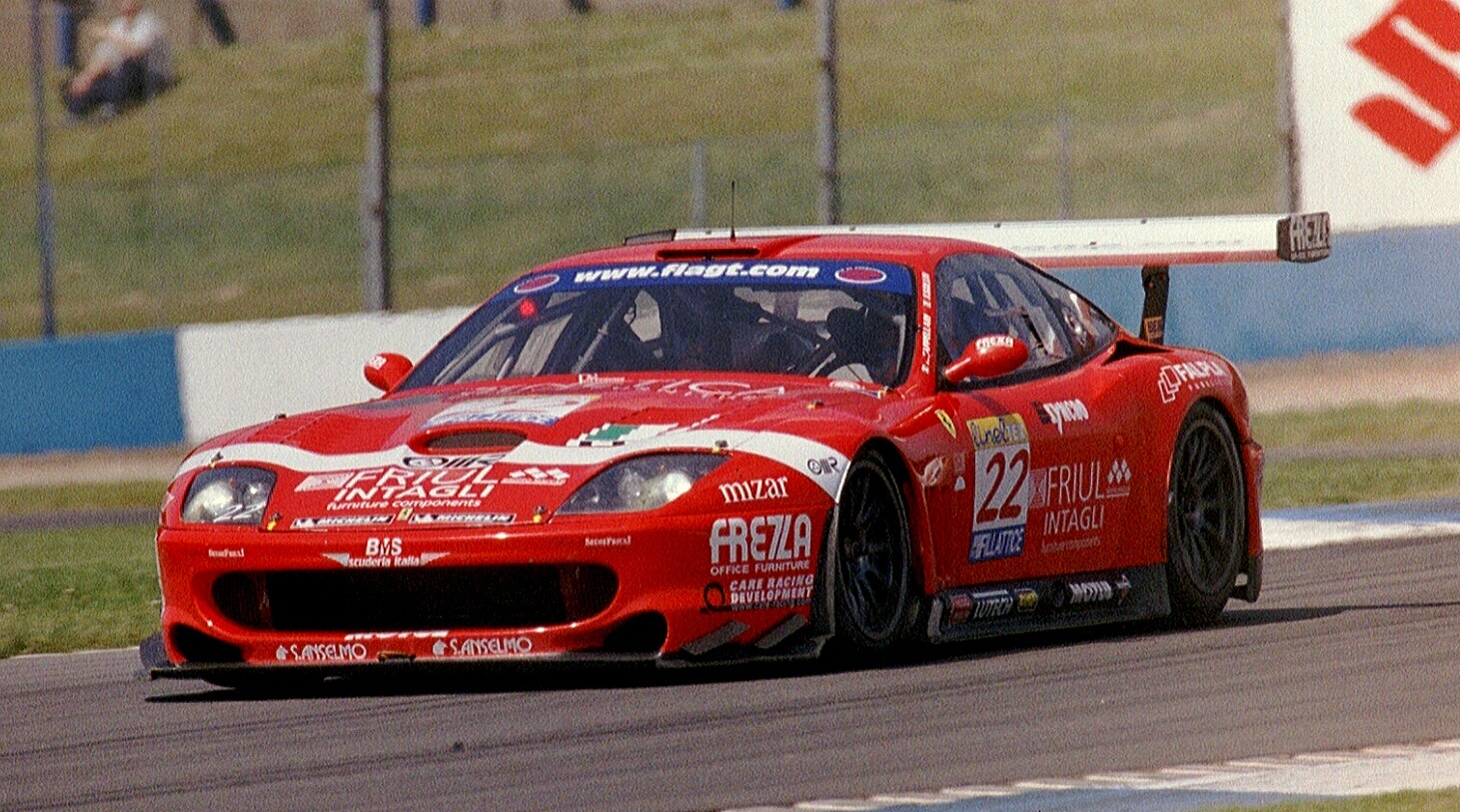
- Cappellari in 2003
- Nationality: (Italy) Italian
- Born: January 22, 1963 (age 63) Udine, Italy

FIA GT Championship career
- Categorisation: FIA Gold
- Years active: 1999–2004
- Teams: Haberthur Racing; Racing Box; Carsport Holland; BMS Scuderia Italia
- Starts: 53
- Wins: 5
- Podiums: 15
- Poles: 5
- Fastest laps: 0
- Best finish: 1st in 2004

Championship titles
- 2008 2004: Campionato Italiano Turismo Endurance; FIA GT Championship – GT

Luca Cappellari (born 22 January 1963) is an Italian racing driver who last competed for Audi Race Experience in the 2012 24 Hours of Nürburgring.

In 2004, Cappellari and his teammate, Fabrizio Gollin, won the FIA GT Championship, whilst driving for BMS Scuderia Italia.

== Racing record ==
=== Career summary ===
Season	Series	Team	Races	Wins	Poles	F/Laps	Podiums	Points	Position
1997	24 Hours of Nürburgring – Class 2		1	0	0	0	0	N/A	6th
1998	24 Hours of Nürburgring – Class 16	Düller Motorsport	1	0	0	0	0	N/A	**1st**
1998	GT Italian Challenge		1	0	0	0	0	?	?
1999	FIA GT Championship – GT	Haberthur Racing	9	0	0	0	0	0	NC
1999	FFSA GT Championship – GT2	Haberthur Racing	1	0	0	0	0	0	NC
2000	FIA GT Championship – GT	Racing Box	7	0	0	0	0	0	NC
2000	24 Hours of Nürburgring – Si4	Düller Motorsport, Österreich	1	0	0	0	0	N/A	DNF
2001	FIA GT Championship – GT	Racing Box	9	0	0	0	0	1	33rd
2001	FFSA GT Championship	Racing Box	2	0	0	0	0	0	NC
2002	FIA GT Championship – GT	Team Carsport Holland	10	0	1	0	2	23	9th
2002	American Le Mans Series – GTS	Carsport Holland	1	0	0	0	0	17	34th
2003	FIA GT Championship – GT	BMS Scuderia Italia	10	2	1	0	7	61	**2nd**
2004	FIA GT Championship – GT	BMS Scuderia Italia	10	3	3	0	8	85	**1st**
2005	Italian GT Championship – GT1	BMS Scuderia Italia	14	3	5	0	10	174	5th
2006	Italian GT Championship – GT1	Racing Box	13	3	3	5	10	165	4th
2006	International GT Open – GTS	Racing Box	2	1	1	0	2	?	?
2007	24 Hours of Nürburgring – SP9	Düller Motorsport	1	0	0	0	1	N/A	**3rd**
2008	Campionato Italiano Turismo Endurance	Düller Motorsport	8	2	?	?	6	132	**1st**
2009	Campionato Italiano Turismo Endurance	Düller Motorsport	15	1	?	?	7	128	**3rd**
2010	International Superstars Series	Team BMW Italia	20	1	0	1	1	42	10th
2011	24 Hours of Nürburgring – E1-XP2	Scuderia Cameron Glickenhaus	1	0	0	0	1	N/A	**2nd**
2012	24 Hours of Nürburgring – SP9	Audi Race Experience	1	0	0	0	0	N/A	DNF

=== Complete FIA GT Championship results ===
(key) (Races in bold indicate pole position) (Races in italics indicate fastest lap)

Year	Team	Car	Class	1	2	3	4	5	6	7	8	9	10	11	Pos.	Pts
1999	Haberthur Racing	Porsche 911 GT2	GT	MNZ; 7	SIL; Ret	HOC; 8	HUN; 12	ZOL; Ret	OSC; 7	DON; Ret	HOM; 8	GLN; 10	ZHU		NC	0
2000	Racing Box	Chrysler Viper GTS-R	GT	VAL; 13	EST; 11	MNZ; Ret	SIL; Ret	HUN; Ret	ZOL; 7	A1R; Ret	LAU; 13	BRN; 12	MAG; Ret		NC	0
2001	Racing Box	Chrysler Viper GTS-R	GT	MNZ; DNS	BRN; Ret	MAG; 8	SIL; 7	ZOL; 6	HUN; 8	SPA	A1R; 7	NÜR; 11	JAR; Ret	EST; Ret	33rd	1
2002	Team Carsport Holland	Chrysler Viper GTS-R	GT	MAG; 4	SIL; 5	BRN; 3	JAR; Ret	AND; 4	OSC; 5	SPA; Ret	**PER**; 2	DON; 4	EST; 13		9th	23
2003	BMS Scuderia Italia	Ferrari 550-GTS Maranello	GT	CAT; 2	MAG; 2	PER; DSQ	BRN; 3	DON; 8	**SPA**; 1	AND; 4	OSC; Ret	EST; 2	MNZ; 1		2nd	61
2004	BMS Scuderia Italia	Ferrari 550-GTS Maranello	GT	**MNZ**; 1	VAL; 1	MAG; 3	HOC; 2	BRN; 3	DON; 5	**SPA**; 1	**IMO**; 2	OSC; 1	DUB; 4	ZHU	1st	85
