= 2002 FIA GT Donington 500 km =

Layout of the Donington Park

The 2002 FIA GT Donington 500 km was the ninth round the 2002 FIA GT Championship season. It took place at Donington Park, United Kingdom, on 6 October 2002.

== Official results ==
Class winners in bold. Cars failing to complete 70% of winner's distance marked as Not Classified (NC).

Pos	Class	No	Team	Drivers	Chassis	Tyre	Laps
Pos	Class	No	Team	Drivers	Engine	Tyre	Laps
1	**GT**	**3**	**(Netherlands) Team Carsport Holland (Italy) Racing Box**	**(Netherlands) Mike Hezemans (Belgium) Anthony Kumpen**	**Chrysler Viper GTS-R**	P	**113**
1	**GT**	**3**	**(Netherlands) Team Carsport Holland (Italy) Racing Box**	**(Netherlands) Mike Hezemans (Belgium) Anthony Kumpen**	**Chrysler 8.0L V10**	P	**113**
2	GT	22	(Italy) BMS Scuderia Italia	(France) Jean-Marc Gounon (Switzerland) Enzo Calderari (Switzerland) Lilian Bryner	Ferrari 550-GTS Maranello	MI	113
2	GT	22	(Italy) BMS Scuderia Italia	(France) Jean-Marc Gounon (Switzerland) Enzo Calderari (Switzerland) Lilian Bryner	Ferrari 5.9L V12	MI	113
3	GT	12	(France) Paul Belmondo Racing	(Italy) Fabio Babini (Portugal) Ni Amorim	Chrysler Viper GTS-R	P	113
3	GT	12	(France) Paul Belmondo Racing	(Italy) Fabio Babini (Portugal) Ni Amorim	Chrysler 8.0L V10	P	113
4	GT	4	(Netherlands) Team Carsport Holland (Italy) Racing Box	(Italy) Fabrizio Gollin (Italy) Luca Cappellari	Chrysler Viper GTS-R	P	112
4	GT	4	(Netherlands) Team Carsport Holland (Italy) Racing Box	(Italy) Fabrizio Gollin (Italy) Luca Cappellari	Chrysler 8.0L V10	P	112
5	GT	2	(France) Larbre Compétition Chereau	(France) David Terrien (Sweden) Carl Rosenblad	Chrysler Viper GTS-R	MI	112
5	GT	2	(France) Larbre Compétition Chereau	(France) David Terrien (Sweden) Carl Rosenblad	Chrysler 8.0L V10	MI	112
6	**N-GT**	**54**	**(Germany) Freisinger Motorsport**	**(France) Romain Dumas (Monaco) Stéphane Ortelli**	**Porsche 911 GT3-RS**	D	**109**
6	**N-GT**	**54**	**(Germany) Freisinger Motorsport**	**(France) Romain Dumas (Monaco) Stéphane Ortelli**	**Porsche 3.6L Flat-6**	D	**109**
7	N-GT	76	(Germany) RWS Motorsport	(Austria) Horst Flbermayr, Jr. (Spain) Antonio García	Porsche 911 GT3-R	P	109
7	N-GT	76	(Germany) RWS Motorsport	(Austria) Horst Flbermayr, Jr. (Spain) Antonio García	Porsche 3.6L Flat-6	P	109
8	N-GT	50	(France) JMB Racing	(Italy) Christian Pescatori (Italy) Andrea Bertolini	Ferrari 360 Modena N-GT	P	108
8	N-GT	50	(France) JMB Racing	(Italy) Christian Pescatori (Italy) Andrea Bertolini	Ferrari 3.6L V8	P	108
9	N-GT	60	(Germany) JVG Racing	(United Kingdom) Ian Khan (United Kingdom) Johnny Mowlem	Porsche 911 GT3-RS	P	108
9	N-GT	60	(Germany) JVG Racing	(United Kingdom) Ian Khan (United Kingdom) Johnny Mowlem	Porsche 3.6L Flat-6	P	108
10	N-GT	58	(Italy) Autorlando Sport	(Austria) Philipp Peter (Austria) Toto Wolff	Porsche 911 GT3-RS	P	108
10	N-GT	58	(Italy) Autorlando Sport	(Austria) Philipp Peter (Austria) Toto Wolff	Porsche 3.6L Flat-6	P	108
11	N-GT	77	(Germany) RWS Motorsport	(Russia) Alexey Vasilyev (Russia) Nikolai Fomenko	Porsche 911 GT3-R	P	106
11	N-GT	77	(Germany) RWS Motorsport	(Russia) Alexey Vasilyev (Russia) Nikolai Fomenko	Porsche 3.6L Flat-6	P	106
12	GT	16	(Germany) Proton Competition	(Germany) Gerold Ried (Germany) Christian Ried (Italy) Mauro Casadei	Porsche 911 GT2	Y	105
12	GT	16	(Germany) Proton Competition	(Germany) Gerold Ried (Germany) Christian Ried (Italy) Mauro Casadei	Porsche 3.8L Turbo Flat-6	Y	105
13	N-GT	53	(France) JMB Competition	(Netherlands) Peter Kutemann (France) Batti Pregliasco	Ferrari 360 Modena N-GT	P	104
13	N-GT	53	(France) JMB Competition	(Netherlands) Peter Kutemann (France) Batti Pregliasco	Ferrari 3.6L V8	P	104
14	N-GT	88	(United Kingdom) Team Eurotech	(United Kingdom) Mike Jordan (United Kingdom) Mark Sumpter	Porsche 911 GT3-R	D	102
14	N-GT	88	(United Kingdom) Team Eurotech	(United Kingdom) Mike Jordan (United Kingdom) Mark Sumpter	Porsche 3.6L Flat-6	D	102
15	N-GT	62	(United Kingdom) Cirtek Motorsport	(Italy) Stephen Stokoe (United Kingdom) Adam Jones	Porsche 911 GT3-RS	D	99
15	N-GT	62	(United Kingdom) Cirtek Motorsport	(Italy) Stephen Stokoe (United Kingdom) Adam Jones	Porsche 3.6L Flat-6	D	99
16	N-GT	89	(United Kingdom) Team Eurotech	(United Kingdom) David Jones (United Kingdom) Godfrey Jones	Porsche 911 GT3-R	D	98
16	N-GT	89	(United Kingdom) Team Eurotech	(United Kingdom) David Jones (United Kingdom) Godfrey Jones	Porsche 3.6L Flat-6	D	98
17	N-GT	64	(United Kingdom) Cirtek Motorsport	(Italy) Francesco Merendino (France) Nicolas Poulain	Porsche 911 GT3-R	D	91
17	N-GT	64	(United Kingdom) Cirtek Motorsport	(Italy) Francesco Merendino (France) Nicolas Poulain	Porsche 3.6L Flat-6	D	91
18	N-GT	82	(United Kingdom) Team Veloqx	(United Kingdom) Jamie Davies (Italy) Ivan Capelli	Ferrari 360 Modena N-GT	D	90
18	N-GT	82	(United Kingdom) Team Veloqx	(United Kingdom) Jamie Davies (Italy) Ivan Capelli	Ferrari 3.6L V8	D	90
19	GT	14	(United Kingdom) Lister Storm Racing	(United Kingdom) Jamie Campbell-Walter (Germany) Nicolaus Springer	Lister Storm	D	87
19	GT	14	(United Kingdom) Lister Storm Racing	(United Kingdom) Jamie Campbell-Walter (Germany) Nicolaus Springer	Jaguar 7.0L V12	D	87
20	GT	29	(Sweden) Henrik Roos Team	(Sweden) Henrik Roos (Sweden) Magnus Wallinder	Chrysler Viper GTS-R	D	85
20	GT	29	(Sweden) Henrik Roos Team	(Sweden) Henrik Roos (Sweden) Magnus Wallinder	Chrysler 8.0L V10	D	85
21 DNF	N-GT	52	(France) JMB Competition	(Italy) Pietro Gianni (France) Andrea Garbagnati	Ferrari 360 Modena N-GT	P	77
21 DNF	N-GT	52	(France) JMB Competition	(Italy) Pietro Gianni (France) Andrea Garbagnati	Ferrari 3.6L V8	P	77
22 DNF	N-GT	56	(United Kingdom) EMKA Racing	(United Kingdom) Steve O'Rourke (United Kingdom) Robin Liddell	Porsche 911 GT3-R	D	69
22 DNF	N-GT	56	(United Kingdom) EMKA Racing	(United Kingdom) Steve O'Rourke (United Kingdom) Robin Liddell	Porsche 3.6L Flat-6	D	69
23 DNF	GT	5	(France) Force One Racing Team	(France) David Hallyday (France) Philippe Alliot	Chrysler Viper GTS-R	MI	68
23 DNF	GT	5	(France) Force One Racing Team	(France) David Hallyday (France) Philippe Alliot	Chrysler 8.0L V10	MI	68
24 DNF	GT	1	(France) Larbre Compétition Chereau	(France) Christophe Bouchut (Belgium) Vincent Vosse	Chrysler Viper GTS-R	MI	66
24 DNF	GT	1	(France) Larbre Compétition Chereau	(France) Christophe Bouchut (Belgium) Vincent Vosse	Chrysler 8.0L V10	MI	66
25 DNF	N-GT	55	(Germany) Freisinger Motorsport	(France) Stéphane Daoudi (France) Cyrille Sauvage	Porsche 911 GT3-RS	D	63
25 DNF	N-GT	55	(Germany) Freisinger Motorsport	(France) Stéphane Daoudi (France) Cyrille Sauvage	Porsche 3.6L Flat-6	D	63
26 DNF	N-GT	83	(United Kingdom) Team Veloqx	(United Kingdom) Andrew Kirkaldy (United Kingdom) Tim Sugden	Ferrari 360 Modena	D	63
26 DNF	N-GT	83	(United Kingdom) Team Veloqx	(United Kingdom) Andrew Kirkaldy (United Kingdom) Tim Sugden	Ferrari 3.6L V8	D	63
27 DNF	GT	11	(France) Paul Belmondo Racing	(Belgium) Marc Duez (France) Claude-Yves Gosselin	Chrysler Viper GTS-R	P	61
27 DNF	GT	11	(France) Paul Belmondo Racing	(Belgium) Marc Duez (France) Claude-Yves Gosselin	Chrysler 8.0L V10	P	61
28 DNF	GT	9	(France) Team A.R.T.	(France) Jean-Pierre Jarier (France) François Lafon	Chrysler Viper GTS-R	P	57
28 DNF	GT	9	(France) Team A.R.T.	(France) Jean-Pierre Jarier (France) François Lafon	Chrysler 8.0L V10	P	57
29 DNF	N-GT	51	(France) JMB Racing	(Italy) Andrea Montermini (Switzerland) Iradj Alexander	Ferrari 360 Modena N-GT	P	50
29 DNF	N-GT	51	(France) JMB Racing	(Italy) Andrea Montermini (Switzerland) Iradj Alexander	Ferrari 3.6L V8	P	50
30 DNF	GT	23	(Italy) BMS Scuderia Italia	(Italy) Andrea Piccini (Switzerland) Jean-Denis Délétraz	Ferrari 550-GTS Maranello	MI	45
30 DNF	GT	23	(Italy) BMS Scuderia Italia	(Italy) Andrea Piccini (Switzerland) Jean-Denis Délétraz	Ferrari 5.9L V12	MI	45
31 DNF	GT	15	(United Kingdom) Lister Storm Racing	(United Kingdom) Bobby Verdon-Roe (United Kingdom) David Warnock (United Kingdom) Ian McKellar	Lister Storm	D	44
31 DNF	GT	15	(United Kingdom) Lister Storm Racing	(United Kingdom) Bobby Verdon-Roe (United Kingdom) David Warnock (United Kingdom) Ian McKellar	Jaguar 7.0L V12	D	44
32 DNF	GT	32	(Italy) Dart Racing	(Italy) Luca Riccitelli (Austria) Dieter Quester	Ferrari 550 Maranello	P	3
32 DNF	GT	32	(Italy) Dart Racing	(Italy) Luca Riccitelli (Austria) Dieter Quester	Ferrari 6.0L V12	P	3
DNS	N-GT	74	(United Kingdom) Cirtek Motorsport	(United Kingdom) Peter Cook (United Kingdom) Jamie Wall	Porsche 911 GT3-RS	D	–
DNS	N-GT	74	(United Kingdom) Cirtek Motorsport	(United Kingdom) Peter Cook (United Kingdom) Jamie Wall	Porsche 3.6L Flat-6	D	–

== Statistics ==
- Pole position – #22 BMS Scuderia Italia – 1:28.982
- Fastest lap – #22 BMS Scuderia Italia – 1:30.444
- Average speed – 151.100 km/h

FIA GT Championship
Previous race: 2002 FIA GT Pergusa 500km	2002 season	Next race: 2002 FIA GT Estoril 500km
