= 2002 FIA GT Estoril 500km =

Layout of the Autódromo do Estoril

The 2002 FIA GT Estoril 500 km was the tenth and final round the 2002 FIA GT Championship season. It took place at the Autódromo do Estoril, Portugal, on 20 October 2002.

== Official results ==
Class winners in bold. Cars failing to complete 70% of winner's distance marked as Not Classified (NC).

Pos	Class	No	Team	Drivers	Chassis	Tyre	Laps
Pos	Class	No	Team	Drivers	Engine	Tyre	Laps
1	**GT**	**23**	**(Italy) BMS Scuderia Italia**	**(Italy) Andrea Piccini (Switzerland) Jean-Denis Délétraz**	**Ferrari 550-GTS Maranello**	MI	**100**
1	**GT**	**23**	**(Italy) BMS Scuderia Italia**	**(Italy) Andrea Piccini (Switzerland) Jean-Denis Délétraz**	**Ferrari 5.9L V12**	MI	**100**
2	GT	3	(Netherlands) Team Carsport Holland (Italy) Racing Box	(Netherlands) Mike Hezemans (Belgium) Anthony Kumpen	Chrysler Viper GTS-R	P	100
2	GT	3	(Netherlands) Team Carsport Holland (Italy) Racing Box	(Netherlands) Mike Hezemans (Belgium) Anthony Kumpen	Chrysler 8.0L V10	P	100
3	GT	14	(United Kingdom) Lister Storm Racing	(United Kingdom) Jamie Campbell-Walter (Germany) Nicolaus Springer	Lister Storm	D	100
3	GT	14	(United Kingdom) Lister Storm Racing	(United Kingdom) Jamie Campbell-Walter (Germany) Nicolaus Springer	Jaguar 7.0L V12	D	100
4	GT	1	(France) Larbre Compétition Chéreau	(France) Christophe Bouchut (Belgium) Vincent Vosse	Chrysler Viper GTS-R	MI	100
4	GT	1	(France) Larbre Compétition Chéreau	(France) Christophe Bouchut (Belgium) Vincent Vosse	Chrysler 8.0L V10	MI	100
5	GT	22	(Italy) BMS Scuderia Italia	(France) Jean-Marc Gounon (Switzerland) Enzo Calderari (Switzerland) Lilian Bryner	Ferrari 550-GTS Maranello	MI	99
5	GT	22	(Italy) BMS Scuderia Italia	(France) Jean-Marc Gounon (Switzerland) Enzo Calderari (Switzerland) Lilian Bryner	Ferrari 5.9L V12	MI	99
6	GT	12	(France) Paul Belmondo Racing	(Italy) Fabio Babini (Portugal) Ni Amorim	Chrysler Viper GTS-R	P	99
6	GT	12	(France) Paul Belmondo Racing	(Italy) Fabio Babini (Portugal) Ni Amorim	Chrysler 8.0L V10	P	99
7	N-GT	54	(Germany) Freisinger Motorsport	(Germany) Sascha Maassen (Monaco) Stéphane Ortelli	Porsche 911 GT3-RS	D	98
7	N-GT	54	(Germany) Freisinger Motorsport	(Germany) Sascha Maassen (Monaco) Stéphane Ortelli	Porsche 3.6L Flat-6	D	98
8	N-GT	62	(United Kingdom) Cirtek Motorsport	(France) Romain Dumas (United Kingdom) Adam Jones	Porsche 911 GT3-RS	D	98
8	N-GT	62	(United Kingdom) Cirtek Motorsport	(France) Romain Dumas (United Kingdom) Adam Jones	Porsche 3.6L Flat-6	D	98
9	GT	9	(France) Team A.R.T.	(France) Jean-Pierre Jarier (France) François Lafon	Chrysler Viper GTS-R	P	97
9	GT	9	(France) Team A.R.T.	(France) Jean-Pierre Jarier (France) François Lafon	Chrysler 8.0L V10	P	97
10	N-GT	83	(United Kingdom) Team Veloqx	(United Kingdom) Andrew Kirkaldy (United Kingdom) Tim Sugden	Ferrari 360 Modena	D	96
10	N-GT	83	(United Kingdom) Team Veloqx	(United Kingdom) Andrew Kirkaldy (United Kingdom) Tim Sugden	Ferrari 3.6L V8	D	96
11	N-GT	50	(France) JMB Racing	(Italy) Christian Pescatori (Italy) Andrea Bertolini	Ferrari 360 Modena N-GT	P	96
11	N-GT	50	(France) JMB Racing	(Italy) Christian Pescatori (Italy) Andrea Bertolini	Ferrari 3.6L V8	P	96
12	GT	34	(Netherlands) Zwaan's Racing	(Netherlands) Arjan van der Zwaan (Netherlands) Rob van der Zwaan	Chrysler Viper GTS-R	D	96
12	GT	34	(Netherlands) Zwaan's Racing	(Netherlands) Arjan van der Zwaan (Netherlands) Rob van der Zwaan	Chrysler 8.0L V10	D	96
13	N-GT	60	(Germany) JVG Racing	(United Kingdom) Ian Khan (United Kingdom) Johnny Mowlem	Porsche 911 GT3-RS	P	96
13	N-GT	60	(Germany) JVG Racing	(United Kingdom) Ian Khan (United Kingdom) Johnny Mowlem	Porsche 3.6L Flat-6	P	96
14	N-GT	55	(Germany) Freisinger Motorsport	(France) Stéphane Daoudi (Belgium) Bert Longin	Porsche 911 GT3-RS	D	95
14	N-GT	55	(Germany) Freisinger Motorsport	(France) Stéphane Daoudi (Belgium) Bert Longin	Porsche 3.6L Flat-6	D	95
15	N-GT	58	(Italy) Autorlando Sport	(Austria) Philipp Peter (Austria) Toto Wolff	Porsche 911 GT3-RS	P	95
15	N-GT	58	(Italy) Autorlando Sport	(Austria) Philipp Peter (Austria) Toto Wolff	Porsche 3.6L Flat-6	P	95
16	GT	31	(Germany) Reiter Engineering	(France) Emmanuel Clérico (United Kingdom) Lee Cunningham	Lamborghini Diablo GTR	P	95
16	GT	31	(Germany) Reiter Engineering	(France) Emmanuel Clérico (United Kingdom) Lee Cunningham	Lamborghini 6.0L V12	P	95
17	GT	5	(France) Force One Racing	(France) David Hallyday (France) Philippe Alliot	Chrysler Viper GTS-R	MI	95
17	GT	5	(France) Force One Racing	(France) David Hallyday (France) Philippe Alliot	Chrysler 8.0L V10	MI	95
18	N-GT	76	(Germany) RWS Motorsport	(Germany) Norman Simon (United Kingdom) Paul Knapfield	Porsche 911 GT3-R	P	94
18	N-GT	76	(Germany) RWS Motorsport	(Germany) Norman Simon (United Kingdom) Paul Knapfield	Porsche 3.6L Flat-6	P	94
19	N-GT	51	(France) JMB Racing	(Italy) Andrea Montermini (Italy) Andrea Garbagnati	Ferrari 360 Modena N-GT	P	93
19	N-GT	51	(France) JMB Racing	(Italy) Andrea Montermini (Italy) Andrea Garbagnati	Ferrari 3.6L V8	P	93
20	N-GT	64	(United Kingdom) Cirtek Motorsport	(Portugal) Pedro Névoa (United Kingdom) Roger Walters	Porsche 911 GT3-R	D	91
20	N-GT	64	(United Kingdom) Cirtek Motorsport	(Portugal) Pedro Névoa (United Kingdom) Roger Walters	Porsche 3.6L Flat-6	D	91
21	GT	15	(United Kingdom) Lister Storm Racing	(United Kingdom) Bobby Verdon-Roe (United Kingdom) David Warnock (United Kingdom) Ian McKellar	Lister Storm	D	84
21	GT	15	(United Kingdom) Lister Storm Racing	(United Kingdom) Bobby Verdon-Roe (United Kingdom) David Warnock (United Kingdom) Ian McKellar	Jaguar 7.0L V12	D	84
22	GT	16	(Germany) Proton Competition	(Germany) Gerold Ried (Germany) Christian Ried (Italy) Raffaele Sangiuolo	Porsche 911 GT2	Y	76
22	GT	16	(Germany) Proton Competition	(Germany) Gerold Ried (Germany) Christian Ried (Italy) Raffaele Sangiuolo	Porsche 3.8L Turbo Flat-6	Y	76
23	GT	4	(Netherlands) Team Carsport Holland (Italy) Racing Box	(Italy) Fabrizio Gollin (Italy) Luca Cappellari	Chrysler Viper GTS-R	P	71
23	GT	4	(Netherlands) Team Carsport Holland (Italy) Racing Box	(Italy) Fabrizio Gollin (Italy) Luca Cappellari	Chrysler 8.0L V10	P	71
24 DNF	N-GT	52	(France) JMB Competition	(Italy) Pietro Gianni (Switzerland) Iradj Alexander	Ferrari 360 Modena N-GT	P	59
24 DNF	N-GT	52	(France) JMB Competition	(Italy) Pietro Gianni (Switzerland) Iradj Alexander	Ferrari 3.6L V8	P	59
25 DNF	N-GT	74	(United Kingdom) Cirtek Motorsport	(Austria) Thomas Bleiner (United Kingdom) Jamie Wall	Porsche 911 GT3-RS	D	57
25 DNF	N-GT	74	(United Kingdom) Cirtek Motorsport	(Austria) Thomas Bleiner (United Kingdom) Jamie Wall	Porsche 3.6L Flat-6	D	57
26 DNF	N-GT	77	(Germany) RWS Motorsport	(Russia) Alexey Vasilyev (Russia) Nikolai Fomenko	Porsche 911 GT3-R	P	41
26 DNF	N-GT	77	(Germany) RWS Motorsport	(Russia) Alexey Vasilyev (Russia) Nikolai Fomenko	Porsche 3.6L Flat-6	P	41
27 DNF	GT	32	(Italy) Dart Racing	(Italy) Luca Riccitelli (Austria) Dieter Quester	Ferrari 550 Maranello	P	36
27 DNF	GT	32	(Italy) Dart Racing	(Italy) Luca Riccitelli (Austria) Dieter Quester	Ferrari 6.0L V12	P	36
28 DNF	GT	11	(France) Paul Belmondo Racing	(France) Paul Belmondo (France) Claude-Yves Gosselin	Chrysler Viper GTS-R	P	35
28 DNF	GT	11	(France) Paul Belmondo Racing	(France) Paul Belmondo (France) Claude-Yves Gosselin	Chrysler 8.0L V10	P	35
29 DNF	N-GT	82	(United Kingdom) Team Veloqx	(United Kingdom) Jamie Davies (Italy) Ivan Capelli	Ferrari 360 Modena N-GT	D	24
29 DNF	N-GT	82	(United Kingdom) Team Veloqx	(United Kingdom) Jamie Davies (Italy) Ivan Capelli	Ferrari 3.6L V8	D	24
30 DNF	GT	17	(Germany) Proton Competition	(Austria) Horst Felbermayr, Sr. (Austria) Horst Felbermayr, Jr.	Porsche 911 GT2	Y	16
30 DNF	GT	17	(Germany) Proton Competition	(Austria) Horst Felbermayr, Sr. (Austria) Horst Felbermayr, Jr.	Porsche 3.8L Turbo Flat-6	Y	16
31 DNF	GT	2	(France) Larbre Compétition Chéreau	(France) David Terrien (France) Sébastien Bourdais (Sweden) Carl Rosenblad	Chrysler Viper GTS-R	MI	1
31 DNF	GT	2	(France) Larbre Compétition Chéreau	(France) David Terrien (France) Sébastien Bourdais (Sweden) Carl Rosenblad	Chrysler 8.0L V10	MI	1
DNS	N-GT	53	(France) JMB Competition	(France) Jean-Pierre Malcher (France) Batti Pregliasco	Ferrari 360 Modena N-GT	P	–
DNS	N-GT	53	(France) JMB Competition	(France) Jean-Pierre Malcher (France) Batti Pregliasco	Ferrari 3.6L V8	P	–

== Statistics ==
- Pole position – #23 BMS Scuderia Italia – 1:37.073
- Fastest lap – #23 BMS Scuderia Italia – 1:40.099
- Average speed – 138.880 km/h

FIA GT Championship
Previous race: 2002 FIA GT Donington 500km	2002 season	Next race: None
