= Lilian Bryner =

Racing Driver in Switzerland

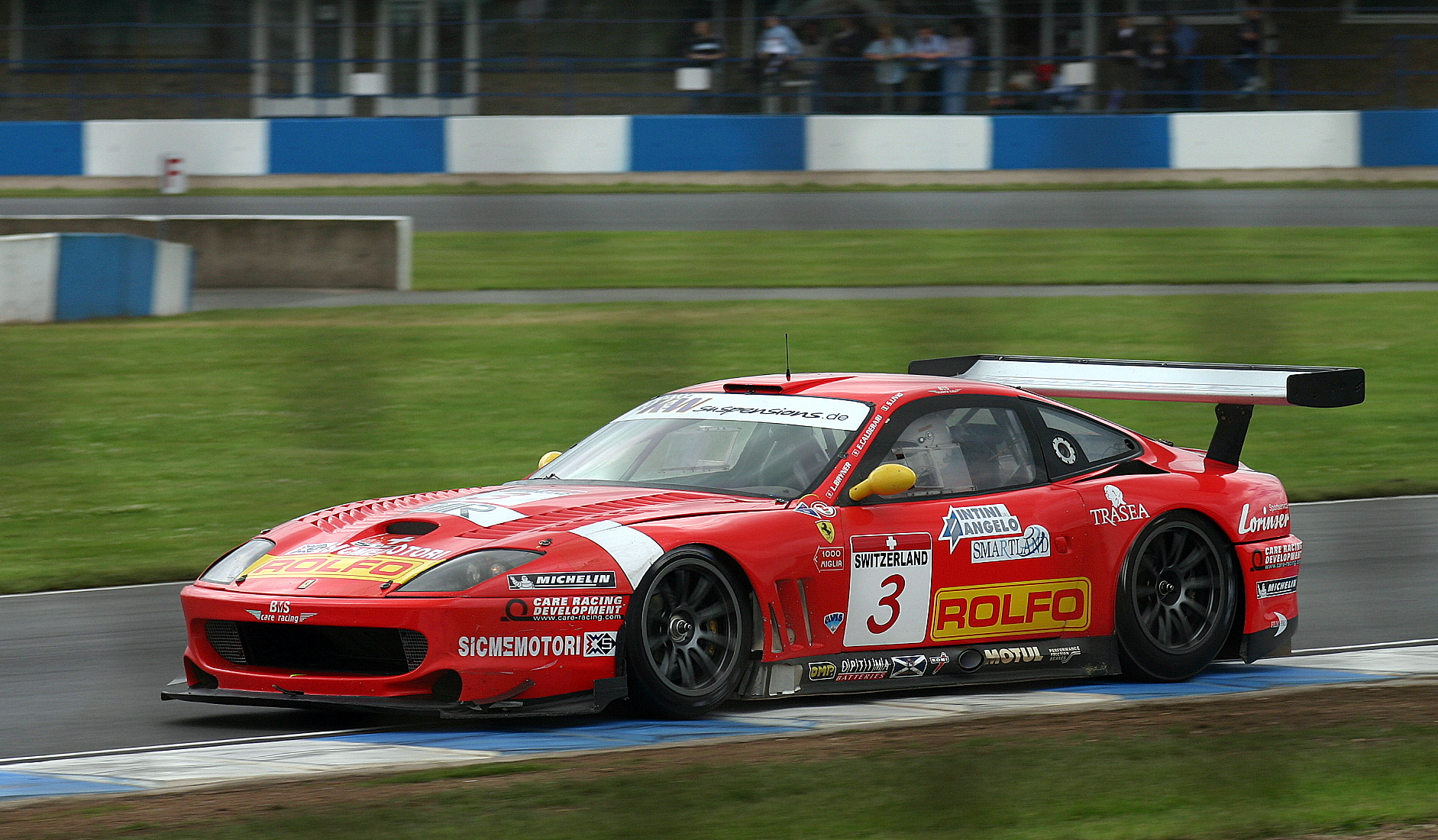
- Bryner in 2004
- Nationality: Switzerland
- Born: 21 April 1959 (age 67); Milan, Italy

24 Hours of Le Mans career
- Years: 1993 – 1995, 1997
- Teams: Cartronic Motorsport, Écurie Biennoise, Stadler Motorpsort
- Best finish: 9th (1994)
- Class wins: 0

Lilian Bryner-Keller (born 21 April 1959) is a racing driver from Switzerland.

== Career ==
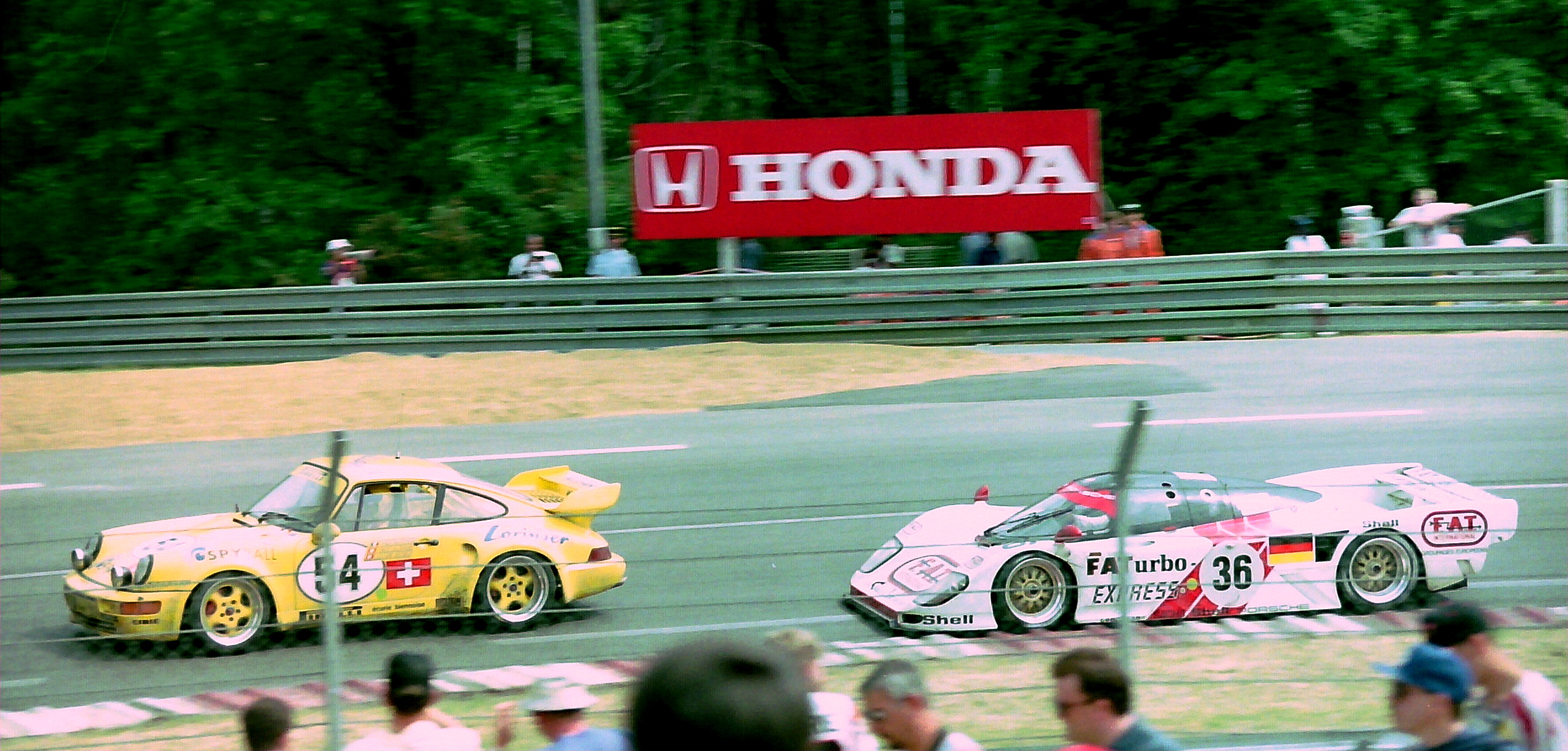
Bryner's yellow Porsche ahead of the race-winning Dauer 962 Le Mans at the 1994 24 Hours of Le Mans.

Bryner has mainly raced in the FIA GT Championship from 1997 until 2005 and has raced in the 24 Hours of Le Mans. Her first race at Le Mans was in 1993, but her most successful was finishing second in the GT2 class with Ecurie Biennoise and ninth overall in 1994. In 1995, she joined Stadler Motorsport, but in the 1995 24 Hours of Le Mans, her No. 79 Porsche 911 GT2 retired completing 81 laps. In the same year, she entered in the BPR Global GT Series and finished third in the standings taking one podium. Bryner won the Porsche Cup, an annual award presented by Porsche AG to recognize the world's most successful privateer racing driver competing with Porsche machinery in a customer racing team, in 1995 together with her teammate Enzo Calderari.

Bryner did not race at Le Mans until 1997 where she once again retired completing 98 laps. That year, she raced with Stadler Motorsport in the inaugural FIA GT season but only three times and picking up the only two points the team got in their class due to the domination of Oreca.

In 1998, Bryner raced in the 1998 International Sports Racing Series season with Autosport Racing until 1999, where she took two podiums before joining BMS Scuderia Italia for the 2001 FIA Sportscar Championship season, picking up 50 points and two podiums.

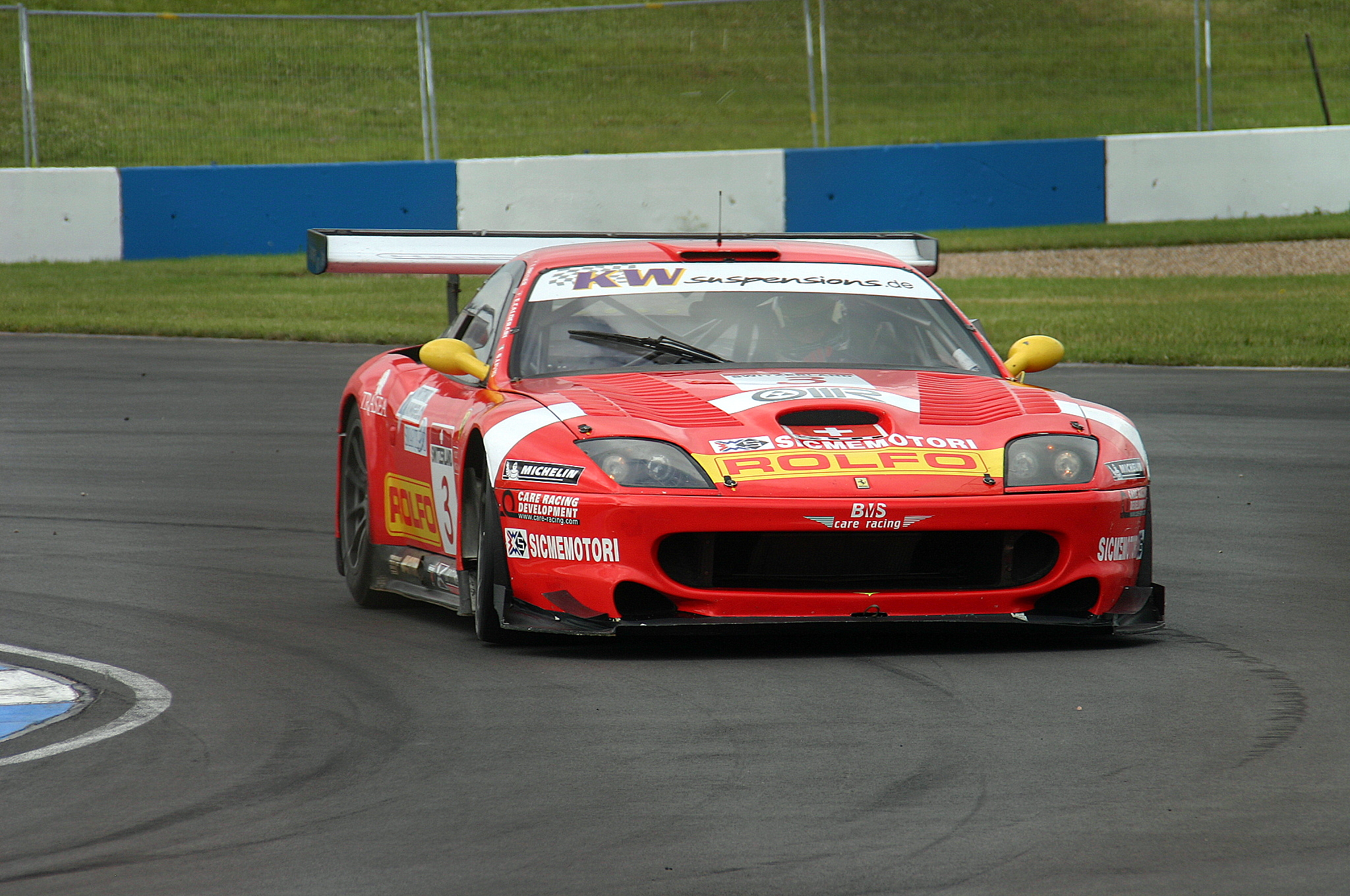
Bryner racing her Ferrari 550 Maranello at Donington in 2004, the year she won the Spa 24 Hours.

Bryner's first full season in FIA GT Championship was in 2003 when she raced with Care Racing. She took one pole position and six podiums helping Care Racing and their Ferrari 550 Maranello to third place in the championship. In the 2004 FIA GT Championship season, she joined BMS Scuderia Italia and took two wins that season, including the crown jewel 24 Hours of Spa, and five podiums. Bryner remains the only woman to have ever won the Spa 24 Hours.

Bryner's final season in FIA GT Championship was in 2005 where she only raced three times with Larbre Compétition.

== Racing record ==
=== 24 Hours of Le Mans results ===
Year	Team	Co-Drivers	Car	Class	Laps	Pos.	Class Pos.
1993	(Switzerland) Cartronic Motorsport	(Switzerland) Enzo Calderari (Italy) Luigino Pagotto	Porsche 911 Carrera 2 Cup	Category 4	64	DNF	DNF
1994	(Switzerland) Écurie Biennoise (private entrant)	(Switzerland) Enzo Calderari (Italy) Renato Mastropietro	Porsche 911 Carrera RSR	LMGT2	299	9th	2nd
1995	(Switzerland) Stadler Motorsport	(Switzerland) Enzo Calderari (Germany) Andreas Fuchs	Porsche 911 GT2	LMGT2	81	DNF	DNF
1996	(Switzerland) Stadler Motorsport	(Switzerland) Enzo Calderari (Germany) Ulrich Richter	Porsche 911 GT2	LMGT2	0	DNS	DNS
1997	(Switzerland) Stadler Motorsport	(Switzerland) Enzo Calderari (Italy) Angelo Zadra	Porsche 911 GT2	LMGT2	98	DNF	DNF

=== 24 Hours of Spa ===
Year	Team	Co-Drivers	Car	Class	Laps	Pos.	Class Pos.
1993	(Germany) Chrzanowski & Klein Racing	(Switzerland) Enzo Calderari (Italy) Luigino Pagotto	Porsche 911 Carrera RS	Pro GT	292	9th	8th
2002	(Italy) BMS Scuderia Italia	(Switzerland) Jean-Denis Delétraz (Italy) Andrea Piccini (Italy) Marco Zadra	Ferrari 550-GTS Maranello	GT	94	DNF	DNF
2003	(Italy) BMS Scuderia Italia	(Switzerland) Enzo Calderari (Italy) Luca Cappellari (Italy) Fabrizio Gollin	Ferrari 550-GTS Maranello	GT	471	2nd	1st
2004	(Italy) BMS Scuderia Italia	(Switzerland) Enzo Calderari (Italy) Luca Cappellari (Italy) Fabrizio Gollin	Ferrari 550-GTS Maranello	GT	558	1st	1st
2005	(France) Larbre Compétition	(Belgium) Frédéric Bouvy (Switzerland) Enzo Calderari (Switzerland) Steve Zacchia	Ferrari 550-GTS Maranello	GT1	562	4th	4th
