= 2000 FIA GT Magny-Cours 500km =

Layout of the Circuit de Nevers Magny-Cours (1992-2002)

The 2000 FIA GT Magny-Cours 500 km was the tenth and final round the 2000 FIA GT Championship season. It took place at the Circuit de Nevers Magny-Cours, France, on October 22, 2000.

== Official results ==
Class winners in bold. Cars failing to complete 70% of winner's distance marked as Not Classified (NC).

Pos	Class	No	Team	Drivers	Chassis	Tyre	Laps
Pos	Class	No	Team	Drivers	Engine	Tyre	Laps
1	**GT**	**14**	**(United Kingdom) Lister Storm Racing**	**(United Kingdom) Jamie Campbell-Walter (United Kingdom) Julian Bailey**	**Lister Storm**	**MI**	**106**
1	**GT**	**14**	**(United Kingdom) Lister Storm Racing**	**(United Kingdom) Jamie Campbell-Walter (United Kingdom) Julian Bailey**	**Jaguar 7.0L V12**	**MI**	**106**
2	GT	25	(Netherlands) Carsport Holland	(Netherlands) Mike Hezemans (Netherlands) Tom Coronel	Chrysler Viper GTS-R	**MI**	106
2	GT	25	(Netherlands) Carsport Holland	(Netherlands) Mike Hezemans (Netherlands) Tom Coronel	Chrysler 8.0L V10	**MI**	106
3	GT	11	(France) Paul Belmondo Racing	(France) Paul Belmondo (Belgium) Marc Duez	Chrysler Viper GTS-R	**D**	106
3	GT	11	(France) Paul Belmondo Racing	(France) Paul Belmondo (Belgium) Marc Duez	Chrysler 8.0L V10	**D**	106
4	GT	10	(France) Paul Belmondo Competition	(Belgium) Anthony Kumpen (France) Claude-Yves Gosselin	Chrysler Viper GTS-R	**D**	105
4	GT	10	(France) Paul Belmondo Competition	(Belgium) Anthony Kumpen (France) Claude-Yves Gosselin	Chrysler 8.0L V10	**D**	105
5	GT	15	(United Kingdom) Lister Storm Racing	(Germany) Nicolaus Springer (Switzerland) Philippe Favre	Lister Storm	**MI**	104
5	GT	15	(United Kingdom) Lister Storm Racing	(Germany) Nicolaus Springer (Switzerland) Philippe Favre	Jaguar 7.0L V12	**MI**	104
6	GT	3	(Germany) Freisinger Motorsport	(Germany) Michael Trunk (Germany) Wolfgang Kaufmann	Porsche 911 GT2	**D**	102
6	GT	3	(Germany) Freisinger Motorsport	(Germany) Michael Trunk (Germany) Wolfgang Kaufmann	Porsche 3.8L Turbo Flat-6	**D**	102
7	GT	22	(Germany) Wieth Racing	(Germany) Niko Wieth (Germany) Franz Wieth	Porsche 911 GT2	**D**	102
7	GT	22	(Germany) Wieth Racing	(Germany) Niko Wieth (Germany) Franz Wieth	Porsche 3.8L Turbo Flat-6	**D**	102
8	**N-GT**	**52**	**(France) Larbre Compétition Chéreau**	**(France) Christophe Bouchut (France) Patrice Goueslard**	**Porsche 911 GT3-R**	**MI**	**102**
8	**N-GT**	**52**	**(France) Larbre Compétition Chéreau**	**(France) Christophe Bouchut (France) Patrice Goueslard**	**Porsche 3.6L Flat-6**	**MI**	**102**
9	N-GT	77	(Germany) RWS Red Bull Racing	(Italy) Luca Riccitelli (Austria) Dieter Quester	Porsche 911 GT3-R	**MI**	102
9	N-GT	77	(Germany) RWS Red Bull Racing	(Italy) Luca Riccitelli (Austria) Dieter Quester	Porsche 3.6L Flat-6	**MI**	102
10	N-GT	50	(United Kingdom) Pennzoil Quaker State G-Force	(United Kingdom) Nigel Smith (Sweden) Magnus Wallinder	Porsche 911 GT3-R	**D**	101
10	N-GT	50	(United Kingdom) Pennzoil Quaker State G-Force	(United Kingdom) Nigel Smith (Sweden) Magnus Wallinder	Porsche 3.6L Flat-6	**D**	101
11	GT	27	(Italy) Autorlando	(Italy) Marco Spinelli (Italy) Gabriele Sabatini (Italy) Fabio Villa	Porsche 911 GT2	**P**	100
11	GT	27	(Italy) Autorlando	(Italy) Marco Spinelli (Italy) Gabriele Sabatini (Italy) Fabio Villa	Porsche 3.8L Turbo Flat-6	**P**	100
12	N-GT	64	(France) Perspective Racing	(France) Thierry Perrier (France) Jean-Paul Richard (Belgium) Michel Neugarten	Porsche 911 GT3-R	**P**	100
12	N-GT	64	(France) Perspective Racing	(France) Thierry Perrier (France) Jean-Paul Richard (Belgium) Michel Neugarten	Porsche 3.6L Flat-6	**P**	100
13	N-GT	79	(Germany) RWS Red Bull Racing	(France) Bob Wollek (Austria) Hans-Jörg Hofer	Porsche 911 GT3-R	**MI**	100
13	N-GT	79	(Germany) RWS Red Bull Racing	(France) Bob Wollek (Austria) Hans-Jörg Hofer	Porsche 3.6L Flat-6	**MI**	100
14	N-GT	60	(Switzerland) Haberthur Racing	(France) Michel Ligonnet (France) Jean-Charles Cartier	Porsche 911 GT3-R	**D**	100
14	N-GT	60	(Switzerland) Haberthur Racing	(France) Michel Ligonnet (France) Jean-Charles Cartier	Porsche 3.6L Flat-6	**D**	100
15	N-GT	55	(Italy) ART Engineering	(Italy) Franco Bertoli (Italy) Paolo Rapetti	Porsche 911 GT3-R	**P**	99
15	N-GT	55	(Italy) ART Engineering	(Italy) Franco Bertoli (Italy) Paolo Rapetti	Porsche 3.6L Flat-6	**P**	99
16	N-GT	57	(Italy) ART Engineering	(Italy) Fabio Mancini (Italy) Gianni Collini	Porsche 911 GT3-R	**P**	99
16	N-GT	57	(Italy) ART Engineering	(Italy) Fabio Mancini (Italy) Gianni Collini	Porsche 3.6L Flat-6	**P**	99
17	N-GT	53	(France) Larbre Compétition Chéreau	(France) Ferdinand de Lesseps (France) Jean-Luc Chéreau (Germany) André Ahrlé	Porsche 911 GT3-R	**MI**	98
17	N-GT	53	(France) Larbre Compétition Chéreau	(France) Ferdinand de Lesseps (France) Jean-Luc Chéreau (Germany) André Ahrlé	Porsche 3.6L Flat-6	**MI**	98
18	N-GT	71	(France) JMB Competition	(France) Philippe Alliot (Netherlands) Peter Kutemann	Ferrari 360 Modena N-GT	**P**	96
18	N-GT	71	(France) JMB Competition	(France) Philippe Alliot (Netherlands) Peter Kutemann	Ferrari 3.6L V8	**P**	96
19	GT	36	(France) Estoril Racing	(Portugal) Michel Monteiro (Portugal) Manuel Monteiro	Porsche 911 GT2	**D**	95
19	GT	36	(France) Estoril Racing	(Portugal) Michel Monteiro (Portugal) Manuel Monteiro	Porsche 3.8L Turbo Flat-6	**D**	95
20	N-GT	70	(France) JMB Competition	(Italy) Batti Pregliasco (Italy) Christian Pescatori (Italy) Marco Lambertini	Ferrari 360 Modena N-GT	**P**	94
20	N-GT	70	(France) JMB Competition	(Italy) Batti Pregliasco (Italy) Christian Pescatori (Italy) Marco Lambertini	Ferrari 3.6L V8	**P**	94
21 DNF	GT	4	(Germany) Freisinger Motorsport	(Germany) Ernst Palmberger (Japan) Yukihiro Hane	Porsche 911 GT2	**D**	95
21 DNF	GT	4	(Germany) Freisinger Motorsport	(Germany) Ernst Palmberger (Japan) Yukihiro Hane	Porsche 3.8L Turbo Flat-6	**D**	95
22 DNF	GT	39	(Netherlands) Carsport Holland	(Netherlands) David Hart (Netherlands) Peter Kox	Chrysler Viper GTS-R	**MI**	67
22 DNF	GT	39	(Netherlands) Carsport Holland	(Netherlands) David Hart (Netherlands) Peter Kox	Chrysler 8.0L V10	**MI**	67
23 DNF	GT	21	(Italy) Racing Box	(Italy) Luca Cappellari (Italy) Angelo Zadra (Italy) Gabriele Matteuzzi	Chrysler Viper GTS-R	**D**	65
23 DNF	GT	21	(Italy) Racing Box	(Italy) Luca Cappellari (Italy) Angelo Zadra (Italy) Gabriele Matteuzzi	Chrysler 8.0L V10	**D**	65
24 DNF	N-GT	58	(Germany) Freisinger Motorsport	(Russia) Nikolai Fomenko (Russia) Alexey Vasilyev	Porsche 911 GT3-R	**D**	64
24 DNF	N-GT	58	(Germany) Freisinger Motorsport	(Russia) Nikolai Fomenko (Russia) Alexey Vasilyev	Porsche 3.6L Flat-6	**D**	64
25 DNF	N-GT	56	(United Kingdom) EMKA GTC	(United Kingdom) Steve O'Rourke (United Kingdom) Tim Sugden	Porsche 911 GT3-R	**P**	48
25 DNF	N-GT	56	(United Kingdom) EMKA GTC	(United Kingdom) Steve O'Rourke (United Kingdom) Tim Sugden	Porsche 3.6L Flat-6	**P**	48
26 DNF	N-GT	51	(United Kingdom) Pennzoil Quaker State G-Force	(United Kingdom) Richard Nearn (United Kingdom) Geoff Lister	Porsche 911 GT3-R	**D**	37
26 DNF	N-GT	51	(United Kingdom) Pennzoil Quaker State G-Force	(United Kingdom) Richard Nearn (United Kingdom) Geoff Lister	Porsche 3.6L Flat-6	**D**	37
27 DNF	GT	7	(Germany) Proton Competition	(Germany) Gerold Ried (Germany) Christian Ried	Porsche 911 GT2	**Y**	16
27 DNF	GT	7	(Germany) Proton Competition	(Germany) Gerold Ried (Germany) Christian Ried	Porsche 3.6L Turbo Flat-6	**Y**	16
28 DNF	GT	38	(Germany) Rupert Atzberger	(Germany) Rupert Atzberger (Germany) Siegfried Kaser	Porsche 911 GT2	?	2
28 DNF	GT	38	(Germany) Rupert Atzberger	(Germany) Rupert Atzberger (Germany) Siegfried Kaser	Porsche 3.8L Turbo Flat-6	?	2
29 DNF	GT	12	(France) Paul Belmondo Racing	(France) Boris Derichebourg (Belgium) Vincent Vosse	Chrysler Viper GTS-R	**D**	0
29 DNF	GT	12	(France) Paul Belmondo Racing	(France) Boris Derichebourg (Belgium) Vincent Vosse	Chrysler 8.0L V10	**D**	0
30 DNF	GT	16	(Switzerland) First Racing	(France) Fabien Giroix (Switzerland) Jean-Denis Délétraz	Ferrari 550 Maranello	**D**	0
30 DNF	GT	16	(Switzerland) First Racing	(France) Fabien Giroix (Switzerland) Jean-Denis Délétraz	Ferrari 6.0L V12	**D**	0
DNS	GT	8	(Switzerland) Haberthur Racing	(France) Patrick Vuillaume (Italy) Mauro Casadei	Porsche 911 GT2	**D**	–
DNS	GT	8	(Switzerland) Haberthur Racing	(France) Patrick Vuillaume (Italy) Mauro Casadei	Porsche 3.8L Turbo Flat-6	**D**	–

== Statistics ==
- Pole position – #15 Lister Storm Racing – 1:36.215
- Fastest lap – #15 Lister Storm Racing – 1:37.249
- Average speed – 149.760 km/h

FIA GT Championship
Previous race: 2000 FIA GT Brno 500km	2000 season	Next race: None
