= Fabrizio Gollin =

Italian racing driver

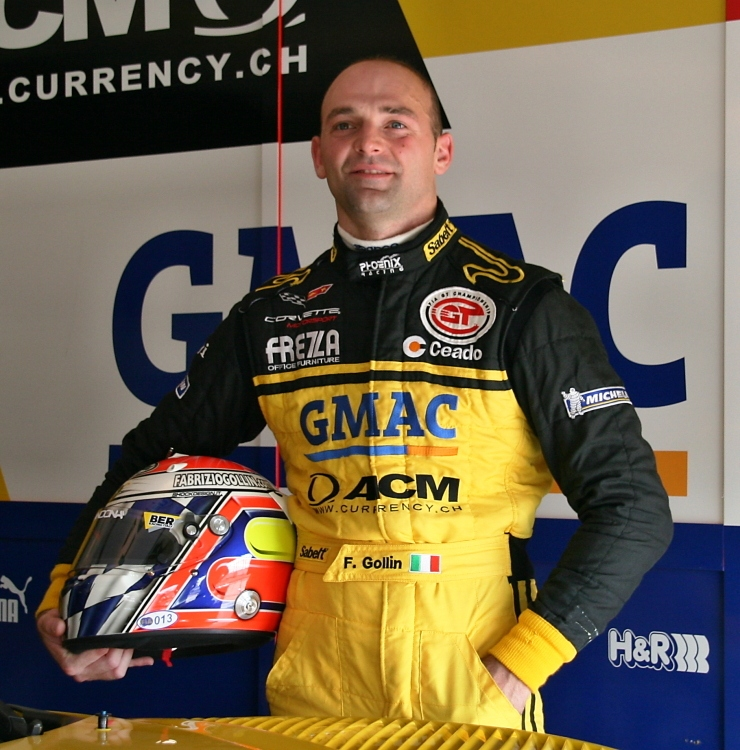
- Nationality: (Italy) Italian
- Born: 28 March 1975 (age 51) Camposampiero (Italy)

FIA GT Championship career
- Debut season: 2002
- Current team: Phoenix Carsport (Corvette C6R)
- Car number: 6
- Former teams: BMS Scuderia Italia; Larbre Compétition; Vitaphone Racing
- Starts: 54
- Wins: 8
- Poles: 5
- Best finish: 1st in 2004

Previous series
- 1993 1994-95 1996-2001 2005 2005: Formula Europa Boxer; Italian F3; F3000; Rolex Sports Car Series; Le Mans Series

Championship titles
- 2004 1998: FIA GT Championship; Bologna Motorshow F3000 Sprint

Fabrizio Gollin (born 28 March 1975 in Camposampiero, Province of Padua) is an Italian racing driver who shared the FIA GT Championship with Luca Cappellari in 2004 while driving for BMS Scuderia Italia. He also is a winner of the Spa 24 Hours in 2004 & 2007. In 2008, he raced for the Phoenix Carsport Team in a Chevrolet Corvette C6-R, and raced in the Daytona 24 Hours for Doran Racing in a Ford Daytona Prototype.

== Racing record ==
=== Complete International Formula 3000 results ===
(key) (Races in bold indicate pole position; races in italics indicate fastest lap.)

Year	Entrant	Chassis	Engine	1	2	3	4	5	6	7	8	9	10	11	12	Pos.	Pts
1996	Durango Équipe	Lola T96/50	Zytek-Judd	NÜR; Ret	PAU; 10	PER; 9	HOC; Ret	SIL; 9	SPA; 11	MAG; Ret	EST; 5	MUG; 22†	HOC; DNQ			16th	2
1997	Apomatox	Lola T96/50	Zytek-Judd	SIL; Ret	PAU; Ret	HEL; Ret	NÜR	PER	HOC	A1R	SPA	MUG; 13	JER			34th	0
1998	GS Team	Lola T96/50	Zytek-Judd	OSC; DNQ	IMO; 17	CAT; DNQ	SIL; Ret	MON; Ret	PAU; DNQ	A1R; 21	HOC; DNQ	HUN; Ret	SPA; DNQ	PER; 14	NÜR; Ret	35th	0
1999	GP Racing	Lola T99/50	Zytek	IMO; DNQ	MON; 11	CAT; 12	MAG; 11	SIL; DNQ	A1R; Ret	HOC; Ret	HUN; 11	SPA; 13	NÜR; 18			NC	0
2000	Coloni F3000	Lola T99/50	Zytek	IMO; 6	SIL; DNQ	CAT; 17	NÜR; 2	MON; 10	MAG; 14	A1R; DNQ	HOC; Ret	HUN; 18	SPA; Ret			10th	7
2001	Coloni F3000	Lola T99/50	Zytek	INT; 6	IMO; 8	CAT; 17	A1R; Ret	MON; 8	NÜR; 20	MAG; 12	SIL; 10	HOC; Ret	HUN; Ret	SPA; 12	MNZ; 11	19th	1

=== Complete 24 Hours of Le Mans results ===
Year	Team	Co-Drivers	Car	Class	Laps	Pos.	Class Pos.
2005	(Italy) BMS Scuderia Italia	(Italy) Christian Pescatori (Portugal) Miguel Ramos	Ferrari 550-GTS Maranello	GT1	67	DNF	DNF
2006	(Italy) BMS Scuderia Italia	(Italy) Fabio Babini (Italy) Christian Pescatori	Aston Martin DBR9	GT1	3	DNF	DNF
2007	(France) Aston Martin Racing Larbre	(France) Christophe Bouchut (Denmark) Casper Elgaard	Aston Martin DBR9	GT1	341	7th	**3rd**

Sporting positions
Preceded by Thomas Biagi; Matteo Bobbi	FIA GT Champion; 2004 with: Luca Cappellari	Succeeded by Gabriele Gardel
