= 2002 FIA GT Championship =

Motorsport season

Seasons
- ← 2001 2003 →

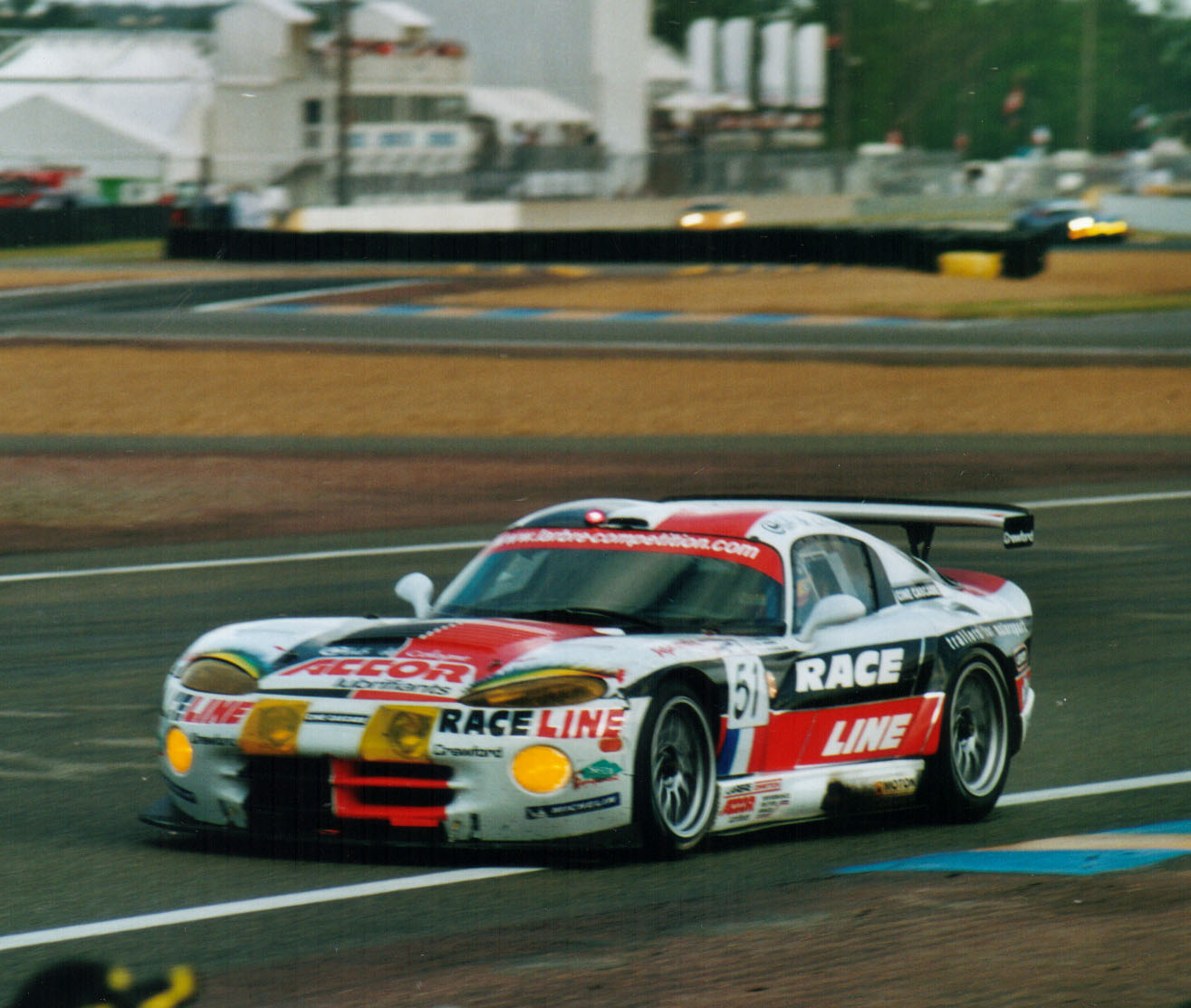
Larbre Compétition-Chereau won the GT Teams Championship with its Chrysler Viper GTS-Rs (pictured at non-championship race)

The 2002 FIA GT Championship was the sixth season of the FIA GT Championship, an auto racing series regulated by the Fédération Internationale de l'Automobile (FIA) and organized by the Stéphane Ratel Organisation (SRO). The races featured grand touring cars divided into two categories and awarded championships and cups for drivers and teams in each category. The season commenced on 21 April 2002 and concluded on 20 October 2002 with ten races held through Europe.

Christophe Bouchut won his second consecutive GT Drivers' Championship by a single point over Larbre Compétition-Chereau teammate David Terrien. Larbre also secured the team championship, beating Lister Storm Racing The N-GT Cup was won by Porsche driver Stéphane Ortelli after he won seven races, while his Freisinger Motorsport squad earned the teams title.

== Schedule ==
The FIA GT Championship retained its partnership with Eurosport and the European Touring Car Championship, sharing their schedule and race weekends under the Super Racing Weekend moniker, now with sponsorship from LG Corporation. The ETCC also added a support event for the Spa 24 Hours for the first time, instead of the FIA GT series running on its own. Several races were however dropped or replaced for 2002, with the schedule shortened to ten rounds from eleven. Monza was replaced by the Autodromo di Pergusa for the Italian round, and Oschersleben became the German round for the first time since 1999, replacing the Nürburgring. Donington Park became the second British round, as it too had been used in 1999. The Hungaroring, Zolder, and A1-Ring were all removed from the calendar, while Anderstorp marked the first Scandinavian event held since Helsinki Thunder in 1997. All events, with exception of Spa, retained their 500 km (310 mi) race distance.

| Rnd | Race | Circuit | Date |
|---|---|---|---|
| 1 | LG Super Racing Weekend Magny-Cours | Circuit de Nevers Magny-Cours, Magny-Cours, France | 21 April |
| 2 | LG Super Racing Weekend Silverstone | Silverstone Circuit, Silverstone, United Kingdom | 5 May |
| 3 | LG Super Racing Weekend Brno | Automotodrom Brno, Brno, Czech Republic | 19 May |
| 4 | LG Super Racing Weekend Jarama | Circuito Permanente Del Jarama, San Sebastián de los Reyes, Spain | 2 June |
| 5 | LG Super Racing Weekend Anderstorp | Scandinavian Raceway, Anderstorp, Sweden | 30 June |
| 6 | LG Super Racing Weekend Oschersleben | Motopark Oschersleben, Oschersleben, Germany | 14 July |
| 7 | Proximus 24H of Spa | Circuit de Spa-Francorchamps, Stavelot, Belgium | 3–4 August |
| 8 | LG Super Racing Weekend Enna-Pergusa | Autodromo di Pergusa, Pergusa, Italy | 22 September |
| 9 | LG Super Racing Weekend Donington Park | Donington Park, Leicestershire, United Kingdom | 6 October |
| 10 | LG Super Racing Weekend Estoril | Autódromo do Estoril, Estoril, Portugal | 20 October |

== Entries ==
=== GT ===
| Entrant | Car | Engine | Tyre | No. | Drivers | Rounds |
|---|---|---|---|---|---|---|
| (France) Larbre Compétition-Chereau | Chrysler Viper GTS-R | Chrysler 356-T6 8.0 L V10 | M | 1 | (France) Christophe Bouchut | All |
| (France) Larbre Compétition-Chereau | Chrysler Viper GTS-R | Chrysler 356-T6 8.0 L V10 | M | 1 | (France) David Terrien | 1–8 |
| (France) Larbre Compétition-Chereau | Chrysler Viper GTS-R | Chrysler 356-T6 8.0 L V10 | M | 1 | (Belgium) Vincent Vosse | 2, 7, 9–10 |
| (France) Larbre Compétition-Chereau | Chrysler Viper GTS-R | Chrysler 356-T6 8.0 L V10 | M | 1 | (France) Sébastien Bourdais | 7 |
| (France) Larbre Compétition-Chereau | Chrysler Viper GTS-R | Chrysler 356-T6 8.0 L V10 | M | 2 | (Sweden) Carl Rosenblad | 1, 3–10 |
| (France) Larbre Compétition-Chereau | Chrysler Viper GTS-R | Chrysler 356-T6 8.0 L V10 | M | 2 | (Belgium) Vincent Vosse | 1, 3–6, 8 |
| (France) Larbre Compétition-Chereau | Chrysler Viper GTS-R | Chrysler 356-T6 8.0 L V10 | M | 2 | (France) Jean-Luc Chéreau | 7 |
| (France) Larbre Compétition-Chereau | Chrysler Viper GTS-R | Chrysler 356-T6 8.0 L V10 | M | 2 | (France) Jean-Claude Lagniez | 7 |
| (France) Larbre Compétition-Chereau | Chrysler Viper GTS-R | Chrysler 356-T6 8.0 L V10 | M | 2 | (Belgium) Didier Defourny | 7 |
| (France) Larbre Compétition-Chereau | Chrysler Viper GTS-R | Chrysler 356-T6 8.0 L V10 | M | 2 | (France) David Terrien | 9–10 |
| (France) Larbre Compétition-Chereau | Chrysler Viper GTS-R | Chrysler 356-T6 8.0 L V10 | M | 2 | (France) Sébastien Bourdais | 10 |
| (Netherlands) Team Carsport Holland | Chrysler Viper GTS-R | Chrysler 356-T6 8.0 L V10 | P | 3 | (Netherlands) Mike Hezemans | All |
| (Netherlands) Team Carsport Holland | Chrysler Viper GTS-R | Chrysler 356-T6 8.0 L V10 | P | 3 | (Belgium) Anthony Kumpen | All |
| (Netherlands) Team Carsport Holland | Chrysler Viper GTS-R | Chrysler 356-T6 8.0 L V10 | P | 3 | (Belgium) Thierry Tassin | 7 |
| (Netherlands) Team Carsport Holland | Chrysler Viper GTS-R | Chrysler 356-T6 8.0 L V10 | P | 4 | (Italy) Fabrizio Gollin | All |
| (Netherlands) Team Carsport Holland | Chrysler Viper GTS-R | Chrysler 356-T6 8.0 L V10 | P | 4 | (Italy) Luca Cappellari | All |
| (Netherlands) Team Carsport Holland | Chrysler Viper GTS-R | Chrysler 356-T6 8.0 L V10 | P | 4 | (Belgium) Bas Leinders | 7 |
| (France) Force One Racing | Ferrari 550 Millennio; Chrysler Viper GTS-R (Note: Force One Racing switched from a Ferrari to a Chrysler Viper from Round 9 onward.) | Ferrari F133 6.0 L V12; Chrysler 356-T6 8.0 L V10 | M | 5 | (France) David Hallyday | 1–4, 6–7, 9–10 |
| (France) Force One Racing | Ferrari 550 Millennio; Chrysler Viper GTS-R | Ferrari F133 6.0 L V12; Chrysler 356-T6 8.0 L V10 | M | 5 | (France) Philippe Alliot | 1–4, 6–7, 9–10 |
| (France) Force One Racing | Ferrari 550 Millennio; Chrysler Viper GTS-R | Ferrari F133 6.0 L V12; Chrysler 356-T6 8.0 L V10 | M | 5 | (France) François Jakubowski | 7 |
| (France) Force One Racing | Ferrari 550 Millennio; Chrysler Viper GTS-R | Ferrari F133 6.0 L V12; Chrysler 356-T6 8.0 L V10 | M | 5 | (Italy) Vittorio Zoboli | 7 |
| (Germany) RWS Motorsport | Porsche 911 GT | Porsche 3.9 L Flat-6 | P | 7 | (Austria) Dieter Quester | 1–3 |
| (Germany) RWS Motorsport | Porsche 911 GT | Porsche 3.9 L Flat-6 | P | 7 | (Italy) Luca Riccitelli | 1–3 |
| (France) Team ART | Chrysler Viper GTS-R | Chrysler 356-T6 8.0 L V10 | P | 9 | (France) Jean-Pierre Jarier | 1–5, 9–10 |
| (France) Team ART | Chrysler Viper GTS-R | Chrysler 356-T6 8.0 L V10 | P | 9 | (France) François Lafon | 1–2, 4–5, 9–10 |
| (France) Team ART | Chrysler Viper GTS-R | Chrysler 356-T6 8.0 L V10 | P | 9 | (Monaco) Olivier Beretta | 3 |
| (France) Paul Belmondo Racing | Chrysler Viper GTS-R | Chrysler 356-T6 8.0 L V10 | P | 11 | (France) Paul Belmondo | 1–8, 10 |
| (France) Paul Belmondo Racing | Chrysler Viper GTS-R | Chrysler 356-T6 8.0 L V10 | P | 11 | (France) Claude-Yves Gosselin | 1–2, 4–7, 9–10 |
| (France) Paul Belmondo Racing | Chrysler Viper GTS-R | Chrysler 356-T6 8.0 L V10 | P | 11 | (Belgium) Robert Dierick | 3 |
| (France) Paul Belmondo Racing | Chrysler Viper GTS-R | Chrysler 356-T6 8.0 L V10 | P | 11 | (Japan) Ryō Fukuda | 7 |
| (France) Paul Belmondo Racing | Chrysler Viper GTS-R | Chrysler 356-T6 8.0 L V10 | P | 11 | (France) Boris Derichebourg | 8 |
| (France) Paul Belmondo Racing | Chrysler Viper GTS-R | Chrysler 356-T6 8.0 L V10 | P | 11 | (Belgium) Marc Duez | 9 |
| (France) Paul Belmondo Racing | Chrysler Viper GTS-R | Chrysler 356-T6 8.0 L V10 | P | 12 | (Italy) Fabio Babini | All |
| (France) Paul Belmondo Racing | Chrysler Viper GTS-R | Chrysler 356-T6 8.0 L V10 | P | 12 | (Belgium) Marc Duez | 1–8 |
| (France) Paul Belmondo Racing | Chrysler Viper GTS-R | Chrysler 356-T6 8.0 L V10 | P | 12 | (France) Boris Derichebourg | 7 |
| (France) Paul Belmondo Racing | Chrysler Viper GTS-R | Chrysler 356-T6 8.0 L V10 | P | 12 | (Portugal) Ni Amorim | 9–10 |
| (United Kingdom) Lister Storm Racing | Lister Storm GTM | Jaguar 7.0 L V12 | D | 14 | (United Kingdom) Jamie Campbell-Walter | All |
| (United Kingdom) Lister Storm Racing | Lister Storm GTM | Jaguar 7.0 L V12 | D | 14 | (Germany) Nicolaus Springer | All |
| (United Kingdom) Lister Storm Racing | Lister Storm GTM | Jaguar 7.0 L V12 | D | 14 | (United Kingdom) Andy Wallace | 7 |
| (United Kingdom) Lister Storm Racing | Lister Storm GTM | Jaguar 7.0 L V12 | D | 14 | (Belgium) Eric van de Poele | 7 |
| (United Kingdom) Lister Storm Racing | Lister Storm GTM | Jaguar 7.0 L V12 | D | 15 | (United Kingdom) Bobby Verdon-Roe | All |
| (United Kingdom) Lister Storm Racing | Lister Storm GTM | Jaguar 7.0 L V12 | D | 15 | (United Kingdom) Paul Knapfield | 1–6 |
| (United Kingdom) Lister Storm Racing | Lister Storm GTM | Jaguar 7.0 L V12 | D | 15 | (Spain) Miguel Ángel de Castro | 7–8 |
| (United Kingdom) Lister Storm Racing | Lister Storm GTM | Jaguar 7.0 L V12 | D | 15 | (United Kingdom) Justin Law | 7 |
| (United Kingdom) Lister Storm Racing | Lister Storm GTM | Jaguar 7.0 L V12 | D | 15 | (Belgium) David Sterckx | 7 |
| (United Kingdom) Lister Storm Racing | Lister Storm GTM | Jaguar 7.0 L V12 | D | 15 | (United Kingdom) David Warnock | 9–10 |
| (United Kingdom) Lister Storm Racing | Lister Storm GTM | Jaguar 7.0 L V12 | D | 15 | (United Kingdom) Ian McKellar | 9–10 |
| (Germany) Proton Competition | Porsche 911 GT2 | Porsche 3.6 L Turbo Flat-6 | Y | 16 | (Germany) Gerold Ried | All |
| (Germany) Proton Competition | Porsche 911 GT2 | Porsche 3.6 L Turbo Flat-6 | Y | 16 | (Italy) Mauro Casadei | 1, 3, 9 |
| (Germany) Proton Competition | Porsche 911 GT2 | Porsche 3.6 L Turbo Flat-6 | Y | 16 | (Austria) Manfred Jurasz | 1 |
| (Germany) Proton Competition | Porsche 911 GT2 | Porsche 3.6 L Turbo Flat-6 | Y | 16 | (Germany) Klaus Horn | 2 |
| (Germany) Proton Competition | Porsche 911 GT2 | Porsche 3.6 L Turbo Flat-6 | Y | 16 | (Germany) Christian Ried | 4–10 |
| (Germany) Proton Competition | Porsche 911 GT2 | Porsche 3.6 L Turbo Flat-6 | Y | 16 | (Austria) Horst Felbermayr | 7 |
| (Germany) Proton Competition | Porsche 911 GT2 | Porsche 3.6 L Turbo Flat-6 | Y | 16 | (Austria) Horst Felbermayr Jr. | 7 |
| (Germany) Proton Competition | Porsche 911 GT2 | Porsche 3.6 L Turbo Flat-6 | Y | 16 | (Italy) Raffaele Sangiuolo | 10 |
| (Germany) Proton Competition | Porsche 911 GT2 | Porsche 3.6 L Turbo Flat-6 | Y | 17 | (Austria) Horst Felbermayr | 1, 3–4, 6, 8, 10 |
| (Germany) Proton Competition | Porsche 911 GT2 | Porsche 3.6 L Turbo Flat-6 | Y | 17 | (Austria) Horst Felbermayr Jr. | 1, 3–4, 10 |
| (Germany) Proton Competition | Porsche 911 GT2 | Porsche 3.6 L Turbo Flat-6 | Y | 17 | (Italy) Mauro Casadei | 6, 8 |
| (Germany) Proton Competition | Porsche 911 GT2 | Porsche 3.6 L Turbo Flat-6 | Y | 17 | (Italy) Giovanni Caligaris | 6 |
| (Germany) Proton Competition | Porsche 911 GT2 | Porsche 3.6 L Turbo Flat-6 | Y | 17 | (Austria) Manfred Jurasz | 8 |
| (Italy) BMS Scuderia Italia | Ferrari 550-GTS Maranello | Ferrari F133 5.9 L V12 | M | 22 | (Switzerland) Enzo Calderari | 1–5, 7–10 |
| (Italy) BMS Scuderia Italia | Ferrari 550-GTS Maranello | Ferrari F133 5.9 L V12 | M | 22 | (Switzerland) Lilian Bryner | 1–5, 8–10 |
| (Italy) BMS Scuderia Italia | Ferrari 550-GTS Maranello | Ferrari F133 5.9 L V12 | M | 22 | (Switzerland) Frédéric Dor | 1–4, 7 |
| (Italy) BMS Scuderia Italia | Ferrari 550-GTS Maranello | Ferrari F133 5.9 L V12 | M | 22 | (Netherlands) Peter Kox | 7 |
| (Italy) BMS Scuderia Italia | Ferrari 550-GTS Maranello | Ferrari F133 5.9 L V12 | M | 22 | (France) Jean-Marc Gounon | 8–10 |
| (Italy) BMS Scuderia Italia | Ferrari 550-GTS Maranello | Ferrari F133 5.9 L V12 | M | 23 | (Italy) Andrea Piccini | All |
| (Italy) BMS Scuderia Italia | Ferrari 550-GTS Maranello | Ferrari F133 5.9 L V12 | M | 23 | (Switzerland) Jean-Denis Délétraz | All |
| (Italy) BMS Scuderia Italia | Ferrari 550-GTS Maranello | Ferrari F133 5.9 L V12 | M | 23 | (Czech Republic) Tomáš Enge | 3 |
| (Italy) BMS Scuderia Italia | Ferrari 550-GTS Maranello | Ferrari F133 5.9 L V12 | M | 23 | (Italy) Marco Zadra | 7 |
| (Italy) BMS Scuderia Italia | Ferrari 550-GTS Maranello | Ferrari F133 5.9 L V12 | M | 23 | (Switzerland) Lilian Bryner | 7 |
| (Poland) Alda Motorsport | Porsche 911 GT2 | Porsche 3.8 L Turbo Flat-6 | D | 24 | (Poland) Maciej Stanco | 1, 3 |
| (Poland) Alda Motorsport | Porsche 911 GT2 | Porsche 3.8 L Turbo Flat-6 | D | 24 | (Poland) Andrzej Dziurka | 1, 3 |
| (Poland) Alda Motorsport | Porsche 911 GT2 | Porsche 3.8 L Turbo Flat-6 | D | 24 | (Poland) Wojciech Dobrzanski | 1 |
| (Poland) Alda Motorsport | Porsche 911 GT2 | Porsche 3.8 L Turbo Flat-6 | D | 24 | (Poland) Maciej Marcinkiewicz | 3 |
| (Belgium) PSI Motorsport | Porsche 911 Bi-Turbo | Porsche 3.6 L Turbo Flat-6 | D | 25 | (Belgium) Kurt Mollekens | 2, 4–5, 7 |
| (Belgium) PSI Motorsport | Porsche 911 Bi-Turbo | Porsche 3.6 L Turbo Flat-6 | D | 25 | (Finland) Markus Palttala | 2, 4–5, 7 |
| (Belgium) PSI Motorsport | Porsche 911 Bi-Turbo | Porsche 3.6 L Turbo Flat-6 | D | 25 | (Belgium) Eric Geboers | 7 |
| (United Kingdom) Cirtek Motorsport | Chrysler Viper GTS-R | Chrysler 356-T6 8.0 L V10 | D | 26 | (United Kingdom) Peter Cook | 2 |
| (United Kingdom) Cirtek Motorsport | Chrysler Viper GTS-R | Chrysler 356-T6 8.0 L V10 | D | 26 | (New Zealand) Neil Cunningham | 2 |
| (United Kingdom) Cirtek Motorsport | Chrysler Viper GTS-R | Chrysler 356-T6 8.0 L V10 | D | 26 | (Sweden) Carl Rosenblad | 2 |
| (France) DDO | Chrysler Viper GTS-R | Chrysler 356-T6 8.0 L V10 | | 27 | (France) Dominique Dupuy | 4 |
| (France) DDO | Chrysler Viper GTS-R | Chrysler 356-T6 8.0 L V10 | | 27 | (France) Miguel Barbany | 4 |
| (Sweden) JPS Porsche Racing Team | Porsche 911 Bi-Turbo | Porsche 3.6 L Turbo Flat-6 | D | 28 | (Sweden) Bo Jonasson | 5 |
| (Sweden) JPS Porsche Racing Team | Porsche 911 Bi-Turbo | Porsche 3.6 L Turbo Flat-6 | D | 28 | (Sweden) Claés Lund | 5 |
| (Sweden) JPS Porsche Racing Team | Porsche 911 Bi-Turbo | Porsche 3.6 L Turbo Flat-6 | D | 28 | (Sweden) Anders Levin | 5 |
| (Sweden) Henrik Roos Team | Chrysler Viper GTS-R | Chrysler 356-T6 8.0 L V10 | D | 29 | (Sweden) Henrik Roos | 5, 9 |
| (Sweden) Henrik Roos Team | Chrysler Viper GTS-R | Chrysler 356-T6 8.0 L V10 | D | 29 | (Sweden) Magnus Wallinder | 5, 9 |
| (Germany) Reiter Engineering | Lamborghini Diablo GTR | Lamborghini 6.0 L V12 | P | 31 | (France) Emmanuel Clérico | 8, 10 |
| (Germany) Reiter Engineering | Lamborghini Diablo GTR | Lamborghini 6.0 L V12 | P | 31 | (United Kingdom) Oliver Gavin | 8 |
| (Germany) Reiter Engineering | Lamborghini Diablo GTR | Lamborghini 6.0 L V12 | P | 31 | (United Kingdom) Lee Cunningham | 10 |
| (Italy) Dart Racing | Ferrari 550 Millennio | Ferrari F133 6.0 L V12 | P | 32 | (Austria) Dieter Quester | 8–10 |
| (Italy) Dart Racing | Ferrari 550 Millennio | Ferrari F133 6.0 L V12 | P | 32 | (Italy) Luca Riccitelli | 8–10 |
| (Netherlands) Zwaan's Racing | Chrysler Viper GTS-R | Chrysler 356-T6 8.0 L V10 | D | 34 | (Netherlands) Arjan van der Zwaan | 10 |
| (Netherlands) Zwaan's Racing | Chrysler Viper GTS-R | Chrysler 356-T6 8.0 L V10 | D | 34 | (Netherlands) Rob van der Zwaan | 10 |

=== N-GT ===
| Entrant | Car | Engine | Tyre | No. | Drivers | Rounds |
|---|---|---|---|---|---|---|
| (France) JMB Racing | Ferrari 360 Modena N-GT | Ferrari 3.6 L V8 | P | 50 | (Italy) Christian Pescatori | All |
| (France) JMB Racing | Ferrari 360 Modena N-GT | Ferrari 3.6 L V8 | P | 50 | (Italy) Andrea Montermini | 1–7 |
| (France) JMB Racing | Ferrari 360 Modena N-GT | Ferrari 3.6 L V8 | P | 50 | (Italy) Andrea Bertolini | 7–10 |
| (France) JMB Racing | Ferrari 360 Modena N-GT | Ferrari 3.6 L V8 | P | 50 | (Italy) Andrea Garbagnati | 7 |
| (France) JMB Racing | Ferrari 360 Modena N-GT | Ferrari 3.6 L V8 | P | 51 | (Italy) Andrea Garbagnati | 1–6, 10 |
| (France) JMB Racing | Ferrari 360 Modena N-GT | Ferrari 3.6 L V8 | P | 51 | (Italy) Andrea Bertolini | 1–6 |
| (France) JMB Racing | Ferrari 360 Modena N-GT | Ferrari 3.6 L V8 | P | 51 | (Switzerland) Iradj Alexander | 7–9 |
| (France) JMB Racing | Ferrari 360 Modena N-GT | Ferrari 3.6 L V8 | P | 51 | (Netherlands) Peter Kutemann | 7 |
| (France) JMB Racing | Ferrari 360 Modena N-GT | Ferrari 3.6 L V8 | P | 51 | (Belgium) Geoffroy Herion | 7 |
| (France) JMB Racing | Ferrari 360 Modena N-GT | Ferrari 3.6 L V8 | P | 51 | (United States) Stephen Earle | 7 |
| (France) JMB Racing | Ferrari 360 Modena N-GT | Ferrari 3.6 L V8 | P | 51 | (Italy) Andrea Montermini | 8–10 |
| (France) JMB Competition | Ferrari 360 Modena N-GT | Ferrari 3.6 L V8 | P | 52 | (Italy) Pietro Gianni | 1–2, 4–6, 8–10 |
| (France) JMB Competition | Ferrari 360 Modena N-GT | Ferrari 3.6 L V8 | P | 52 | (Italy) Gianluca Giraudi | 1–2, 4 |
| (France) JMB Competition | Ferrari 360 Modena N-GT | Ferrari 3.6 L V8 | P | 52 | (Sweden) Tony Ring | 5 |
| (France) JMB Competition | Ferrari 360 Modena N-GT | Ferrari 3.6 L V8 | P | 52 | (France) Jean-Philippe Belloc | 6 |
| (France) JMB Competition | Ferrari 360 Modena N-GT | Ferrari 3.6 L V8 | P | 52 | (Italy) Ludovico Manfredi | 7 |
| (France) JMB Competition | Ferrari 360 Modena N-GT | Ferrari 3.6 L V8 | P | 52 | (Italy) Batti Pregliasco | 7 |
| (France) JMB Competition | Ferrari 360 Modena N-GT | Ferrari 3.6 L V8 | P | 52 | (Italy) Andrea Garbagnati | 8–9 |
| (France) JMB Competition | Ferrari 360 Modena N-GT | Ferrari 3.6 L V8 | P | 52 | (Switzerland) Iradj Alexander | 10 |
| (France) JMB Competition | Ferrari 360 Modena N-GT | Ferrari 3.6 L V8 | P | 53 | (Italy) Batti Pregliasco | 1–4, 6, 8–10 |
| (France) JMB Competition | Ferrari 360 Modena N-GT | Ferrari 3.6 L V8 | P | 53 | (Switzerland) Iradj Alexander | 1–2, 4–6 |
| (France) JMB Competition | Ferrari 360 Modena N-GT | Ferrari 3.6 L V8 | P | 53 | (Netherlands) Peter Kutemann | 1, 5–6, 8–9 |
| (France) JMB Competition | Ferrari 360 Modena N-GT | Ferrari 3.6 L V8 | P | 53 | (Italy) Marco Lambertini | 2–4 |
| (France) JMB Competition | Ferrari 360 Modena N-GT | Ferrari 3.6 L V8 | P | 53 | (France) Jean-Pierre Malcher | 10 |
| (Germany) Freisinger Motorsport | Porsche 911 GT3-RS | Porsche 3.6 L Flat-6 | D | 54 | (Monaco) Stéphane Ortelli | All |
| (Germany) Freisinger Motorsport | Porsche 911 GT3-RS | Porsche 3.6 L Flat-6 | D | 54 | (Portugal) Ni Amorim | 1–2 |
| (Germany) Freisinger Motorsport | Porsche 911 GT3-RS | Porsche 3.6 L Flat-6 | D | 54 | (Germany) Marc Lieb | 3, 8 |
| (Germany) Freisinger Motorsport | Porsche 911 GT3-RS | Porsche 3.6 L Flat-6 | D | 54 | (Germany) Sascha Maassen | 4, 6, 10 |
| (Germany) Freisinger Motorsport | Porsche 911 GT3-RS | Porsche 3.6 L Flat-6 | D | 54 | (France) Emmanuel Collard | 5, 7 |
| (Germany) Freisinger Motorsport | Porsche 911 GT3-RS | Porsche 3.6 L Flat-6 | D | 54 | (France) Romain Dumas | 7, 9 |
| (Germany) Freisinger Motorsport | Porsche 911 GT3-RS | Porsche 3.6 L Flat-6 | D | 55 | (France) Stéphane Daoudi | 1–6, 8–10 |
| (Germany) Freisinger Motorsport | Porsche 911 GT3-RS | Porsche 3.6 L Flat-6 | D | 55 | (Slovakia) Jirko Malchárek | 1 |
| (Germany) Freisinger Motorsport | Porsche 911 GT3-RS | Porsche 3.6 L Flat-6 | D | 55 | (Belgium) Bert Longin | 2–7, 10 |
| (Germany) Freisinger Motorsport | Porsche 911 GT3-RS | Porsche 3.6 L Flat-6 | D | 55 | (Germany) Marc Lieb | 7 |
| (Germany) Freisinger Motorsport | Porsche 911 GT3-RS | Porsche 3.6 L Flat-6 | D | 55 | (Germany) André Lotterer | 7 |
| (Germany) Freisinger Motorsport | Porsche 911 GT3-RS | Porsche 3.6 L Flat-6 | D | 55 | (France) Georges Forgeois | 7 |
| (Germany) Freisinger Motorsport | Porsche 911 GT3-RS | Porsche 3.6 L Flat-6 | D | 55 | (France) Cyrille Sauvage | 8–9 |
| (United Kingdom) EMKA Racing | Porsche 911 GT3-R | Porsche 3.6 L Flat-6 | D | 56 | (United Kingdom) Steve O'Rourke | 9 |
| (United Kingdom) EMKA Racing | Porsche 911 GT3-R | Porsche 3.6 L Flat-6 | D | 56 | (United Kingdom) Robin Liddell | 9 |
| (Italy) Autorlando Sport | Porsche 911 GT3-RS | Porsche 3.6 L Flat-6 | P | 58 | (Austria) Toto Wolff | 1–6, 8–10 |
| (Italy) Autorlando Sport | Porsche 911 GT3-RS | Porsche 3.6 L Flat-6 | P | 58 | (Austria) Philipp Peter | 1, 3–4, 6, 8–10 |
| (Italy) Autorlando Sport | Porsche 911 GT3-RS | Porsche 3.6 L Flat-6 | P | 58 | (United Kingdom) Johnny Mowlem | 2 |
| (Italy) Autorlando Sport | Porsche 911 GT3-RS | Porsche 3.6 L Flat-6 | P | 58 | (Austria) Walter Lechner Jr. | 5 |
| (Italy) Autorlando Sport | Porsche 911 GT3-RS | Porsche 3.6 L Flat-6 | P | 58 | (Germany) Ulrich Schumacher | 7 |
| (Italy) Autorlando Sport | Porsche 911 GT3-RS | Porsche 3.6 L Flat-6 | P | 58 | (Germany) Udo Schneider | 7 |
| (Italy) Autorlando Sport | Porsche 911 GT3-RS | Porsche 3.6 L Flat-6 | P | 58 | (Germany) Stefan Jentzsch | 7 |
| (Italy) Autorlando Sport | Porsche 911 GT3-RS | Porsche 3.6 L Flat-6 | P | 58 | (Germany) Andreas von Zitzewitz | 7 |
| (Italy) Autorlando Sport | Porsche 911 GT3-RS | Porsche 3.6 L Flat-6 | P | 59 | (Italy) Luca Rangoni | 4 |
| (Italy) Autorlando Sport | Porsche 911 GT3-RS | Porsche 3.6 L Flat-6 | P | 59 | (Switzerland) Joël Camathias | 4 |
| (Germany) JVG Racing | Porsche 911 GT3-RS | Porsche 3.6 L Flat-6 | P | 60 | (United Kingdom) Ian Khan | 1–6, 9–10 |
| (Germany) JVG Racing | Porsche 911 GT3-RS | Porsche 3.6 L Flat-6 | P | 60 | (Germany) Jürgen von Gartzen | 1–6 |
| (Germany) JVG Racing | Porsche 911 GT3-RS | Porsche 3.6 L Flat-6 | P | 60 | (Italy) Michele Merendino | 8 |
| (Germany) JVG Racing | Porsche 911 GT3-RS | Porsche 3.6 L Flat-6 | P | 60 | (Italy) Francesco Merendino | 8 |
| (Germany) JVG Racing | Porsche 911 GT3-RS | Porsche 3.6 L Flat-6 | P | 60 | (United Kingdom) Johnny Mowlem | 9–10 |
| (United Kingdom) Cirtek Motorsport | Porsche 911 GT3-R; Porsche 911 GT3-RS | Porsche 3.6 L Flat-6 | D | 62 | (Italy) Raffaele Sangiuolo | 1, 4, 6–7 |
| (United Kingdom) Cirtek Motorsport | Porsche 911 GT3-R; Porsche 911 GT3-RS | Porsche 3.6 L Flat-6 | D | 62 | (Germany) Hans Fertl | 1 |
| (United Kingdom) Cirtek Motorsport | Porsche 911 GT3-R; Porsche 911 GT3-RS | Porsche 3.6 L Flat-6 | D | 62 | (Slovakia) Jirko Malchárek | 2–3 |
| (United Kingdom) Cirtek Motorsport | Porsche 911 GT3-R; Porsche 911 GT3-RS | Porsche 3.6 L Flat-6 | D | 62 | (United Kingdom) Adam Jones | 2, 8–10 |
| (United Kingdom) Cirtek Motorsport | Porsche 911 GT3-R; Porsche 911 GT3-RS | Porsche 3.6 L Flat-6 | D | 62 | (United Kingdom) Kelvin Burt | 3 |
| (United Kingdom) Cirtek Motorsport | Porsche 911 GT3-R; Porsche 911 GT3-RS | Porsche 3.6 L Flat-6 | D | 62 | (France) Jean-Marc Gounon | 4 |
| (United Kingdom) Cirtek Motorsport | Porsche 911 GT3-R; Porsche 911 GT3-RS | Porsche 3.6 L Flat-6 | D | 62 | (Denmark) John Nielsen | 5 |
| (United Kingdom) Cirtek Motorsport | Porsche 911 GT3-R; Porsche 911 GT3-RS | Porsche 3.6 L Flat-6 | D | 62 | (United Kingdom) Robin Liddell | 5 |
| (United Kingdom) Cirtek Motorsport | Porsche 911 GT3-R; Porsche 911 GT3-RS | Porsche 3.6 L Flat-6 | D | 62 | (Italy) Thomas Pichler | 6 |
| (United Kingdom) Cirtek Motorsport | Porsche 911 GT3-R; Porsche 911 GT3-RS | Porsche 3.6 L Flat-6 | D | 62 | (Italy) Roberto Papini | 7 |
| (United Kingdom) Cirtek Motorsport | Porsche 911 GT3-R; Porsche 911 GT3-RS | Porsche 3.6 L Flat-6 | D | 62 | (Belgium) Leo Van Sande | 7 |
| (United Kingdom) Cirtek Motorsport | Porsche 911 GT3-R; Porsche 911 GT3-RS | Porsche 3.6 L Flat-6 | D | 62 | (Belgium) Tom Zurstrassen | 7 |
| (United Kingdom) Cirtek Motorsport | Porsche 911 GT3-R; Porsche 911 GT3-RS | Porsche 3.6 L Flat-6 | D | 62 | (Italy) Moreno Soli | 8 |
| (United Kingdom) Cirtek Motorsport | Porsche 911 GT3-R; Porsche 911 GT3-RS | Porsche 3.6 L Flat-6 | D | 62 | (Italy) Stephen Stokoe | 9 |
| (United Kingdom) Cirtek Motorsport | Porsche 911 GT3-R; Porsche 911 GT3-RS | Porsche 3.6 L Flat-6 | D | 62 | (France) Romain Dumas | 10 |
| (United Kingdom) Cirtek Motorsport | Porsche 911 GT3-R; Porsche 911 GT3-RS | Porsche 3.6 L Flat-6 | D | 64 | (France) Marco Saviozzi | 1, 4 |
| (United Kingdom) Cirtek Motorsport | Porsche 911 GT3-R; Porsche 911 GT3-RS | Porsche 3.6 L Flat-6 | D | 64 | (France) Jean-Luc Blanchemain | 1 |
| (United Kingdom) Cirtek Motorsport | Porsche 911 GT3-R; Porsche 911 GT3-RS | Porsche 3.6 L Flat-6 | D | 64 | (France) Thomas Leriche | 1 |
| (United Kingdom) Cirtek Motorsport | Porsche 911 GT3-R; Porsche 911 GT3-RS | Porsche 3.6 L Flat-6 | D | 64 | (Italy) Raffaele Sangiuolo | 2, 5 |
| (United Kingdom) Cirtek Motorsport | Porsche 911 GT3-R; Porsche 911 GT3-RS | Porsche 3.6 L Flat-6 | D | 64 | (Italy) Roberto Papini | 2 |
| (United Kingdom) Cirtek Motorsport | Porsche 911 GT3-R; Porsche 911 GT3-RS | Porsche 3.6 L Flat-6 | D | 64 | (Germany) Klaus Horn | 4 |
| (United Kingdom) Cirtek Motorsport | Porsche 911 GT3-R; Porsche 911 GT3-RS | Porsche 3.6 L Flat-6 | D | 64 | (United Kingdom) Tim Lawrence | 4 |
| (United Kingdom) Cirtek Motorsport | Porsche 911 GT3-R; Porsche 911 GT3-RS | Porsche 3.6 L Flat-6 | D | 64 | (Italy) Thomas Pichler | 5 |
| (United Kingdom) Cirtek Motorsport | Porsche 911 GT3-R; Porsche 911 GT3-RS | Porsche 3.6 L Flat-6 | D | 64 | (Austria) Manfred Jurasz | 7 |
| (United Kingdom) Cirtek Motorsport | Porsche 911 GT3-R; Porsche 911 GT3-RS | Porsche 3.6 L Flat-6 | D | 64 | (France) Stéphane Daoudi | 7 |
| (United Kingdom) Cirtek Motorsport | Porsche 911 GT3-R; Porsche 911 GT3-RS | Porsche 3.6 L Flat-6 | D | 64 | (France) Julien Piquet | 7 |
| (United Kingdom) Cirtek Motorsport | Porsche 911 GT3-R; Porsche 911 GT3-RS | Porsche 3.6 L Flat-6 | D | 64 | (United States) Vic Rice | 7 |
| (United Kingdom) Cirtek Motorsport | Porsche 911 GT3-R; Porsche 911 GT3-RS | Porsche 3.6 L Flat-6 | D | 64 | (Italy) Francesco Merendino | 9 |
| (United Kingdom) Cirtek Motorsport | Porsche 911 GT3-R; Porsche 911 GT3-RS | Porsche 3.6 L Flat-6 | D | 64 | (France) Nicolas Poulain | 9 |
| (United Kingdom) Cirtek Motorsport | Porsche 911 GT3-R; Porsche 911 GT3-RS | Porsche 3.6 L Flat-6 | D | 64 | (United Kingdom) Roger Walters | 10 |
| (United Kingdom) Cirtek Motorsport | Porsche 911 GT3-R; Porsche 911 GT3-RS | Porsche 3.6 L Flat-6 | D | 64 | (Portugal) Pedro Névoa | 10 |
| (United Kingdom) Cirtek Racing | Porsche 911 GT3-R; Porsche 911 GT3-RS | Porsche 3.6 L Flat-6 | D | 74 | (United Kingdom) Jamie Wall | 9–10 |
| (United Kingdom) Cirtek Racing | Porsche 911 GT3-R; Porsche 911 GT3-RS | Porsche 3.6 L Flat-6 | D | 74 | (United Kingdom) Peter Cook | 9 |
| (United Kingdom) Cirtek Racing | Porsche 911 GT3-R; Porsche 911 GT3-RS | Porsche 3.6 L Flat-6 | D | 74 | (Austria) Thomas Bleiner | 10 |
| (Netherlands) System Force Motorsport | Porsche 911 GT3-RS | Porsche 3.6 L Flat-6 | P | 63 | (Netherlands) Peter van Merksteijn | 1–4, 7 |
| (Netherlands) System Force Motorsport | Porsche 911 GT3-RS | Porsche 3.6 L Flat-6 | P | 63 | (Netherlands) Phil Bastiaans | 1–4, 7 |
| (Netherlands) System Force Motorsport | Porsche 911 GT3-RS | Porsche 3.6 L Flat-6 | P | 63 | (Belgium) Stéphane Vancampenhoudt | 7 |
| (United Kingdom) Sebah Automotive | Porsche 911 GT3-R | Porsche 3.6 L Flat-6 | D | 65 | (United Kingdom) Bart Hayden | 2 |
| (United Kingdom) Sebah Automotive | Porsche 911 GT3-R | Porsche 3.6 L Flat-6 | D | 65 | (United Kingdom) Hugh Hayden | 2 |
| (Italy) MAC Racing | Porsche 911 GT3-R; Porsche 911 GT3-RS | Porsche 3.6 L Flat-6 | P | 66 | (Italy) Francesco Merendino | 2, 4 |
| (Italy) MAC Racing | Porsche 911 GT3-R; Porsche 911 GT3-RS | Porsche 3.6 L Flat-6 | P | 66 | (Italy) Michele Merendino | 2, 4 |
| (Italy) MAC Racing | Porsche 911 GT3-R; Porsche 911 GT3-RS | Porsche 3.6 L Flat-6 | P | 66 | (Switzerland) Fabio Venier | 6 |
| (Italy) MAC Racing | Porsche 911 GT3-R; Porsche 911 GT3-RS | Porsche 3.6 L Flat-6 | P | 66 | (Italy) Moreno Soli | 6 |
| (Italy) MAC Racing | Porsche 911 GT3-R; Porsche 911 GT3-RS | Porsche 3.6 L Flat-6 | P | 66 | (France) Marco Saviozzi | 7 |
| (Italy) MAC Racing | Porsche 911 GT3-R; Porsche 911 GT3-RS | Porsche 3.6 L Flat-6 | P | 66 | (France) Pierre Bes | 7 |
| (Italy) MAC Racing | Porsche 911 GT3-R; Porsche 911 GT3-RS | Porsche 3.6 L Flat-6 | P | 66 | (France) Emmanuel Moinel Delalande | 7 |
| (Italy) MAC Racing | Porsche 911 GT3-R; Porsche 911 GT3-RS | Porsche 3.6 L Flat-6 | P | 66 | (France) Didier Moinel Delalande | 7 |
| (Italy) MAC Racing | Porsche 911 GT3-R; Porsche 911 GT3-RS | Porsche 3.6 L Flat-6 | P | 66 | (Italy) Raffaele Sangiuolo | 8 |
| (Italy) MAC Racing | Porsche 911 GT3-R; Porsche 911 GT3-RS | Porsche 3.6 L Flat-6 | P | 66 | (Italy) Thomas Pichler | 8 |
| (Italy) MAC Racing | Porsche 911 GT3-R; Porsche 911 GT3-RS | Porsche 3.6 L Flat-6 | P | 70 | (Italy) Mauro Casadei | 4 |
| (Italy) MAC Racing | Porsche 911 GT3-R; Porsche 911 GT3-RS | Porsche 3.6 L Flat-6 | P | 70 | (Italy) Moreno Soli | 4 |
| (Italy) MAC Racing | Porsche 911 GT3-R; Porsche 911 GT3-RS | Porsche 3.6 L Flat-6 | P | 70 | (Italy) Francesco Merendino | 6 |
| (Italy) MAC Racing | Porsche 911 GT3-R; Porsche 911 GT3-RS | Porsche 3.6 L Flat-6 | P | 70 | (Italy) Michele Merendino | 6 |
| (Italy) MAC Racing | Porsche 911 GT3-R; Porsche 911 GT3-RS | Porsche 3.6 L Flat-6 | P | 70 | (Italy) Domenico Guagliardo | 8 |
| (Italy) MAC Racing | Porsche 911 GT3-R; Porsche 911 GT3-RS | Porsche 3.6 L Flat-6 | P | 70 | (Italy) Giovanni Ceraulo | 8 |
| (Slovakia) Malchárek Racing | Porsche 911 GT3-RS | Porsche 3.6 L Flat-6 | D | 67 | (Slovakia) Andrej Studenic | 3 |
| (Slovakia) Malchárek Racing | Porsche 911 GT3-RS | Porsche 3.6 L Flat-6 | D | 67 | (Slovakia) Rudolf Machánek | 3 |
| (Czech Republic) Sport Team NH Car | Porsche 911 GT3-RS | Porsche 3.6 L Flat-6 | D | 68 | (Czech Republic) Josef Venč | 3 |
| (Czech Republic) Sport Team NH Car | Porsche 911 GT3-RS | Porsche 3.6 L Flat-6 | D | 68 | (Czech Republic) Václav Nimč | 3 |
| (Czech Republic) Vonka Racing | Porsche 911 GT3-R | Porsche 3.6 L Flat-6 | P | 69 | (Czech Republic) Jan Vonka | 3 |
| (Czech Republic) Vonka Racing | Porsche 911 GT3-R | Porsche 3.6 L Flat-6 | P | 69 | (Czech Republic) Michel Dolák | 3 |
| (Sweden) Podium Racing | Porsche 911 GT3-RS | Porsche 3.6 L Flat-6 | D | 72 | (Sweden) Johan Sturesson | 5 |
| (Sweden) Podium Racing | Porsche 911 GT3-RS | Porsche 3.6 L Flat-6 | D | 72 | (Sweden) Hubert Bergh | 5 |
| (Sweden) Podium Racing | Porsche 911 GT3-RS | Porsche 3.6 L Flat-6 | D | 73 | (Sweden) Marcus Gustavsson | 5 |
| (Sweden) Podium Racing | Porsche 911 GT3-RS | Porsche 3.6 L Flat-6 | D | 73 | (Sweden) Tomas Nyström | 5 |
| (Sweden) Team Eurotech Scandinavian | Porsche 911 GT3-RS | Porsche 3.6 L Flat-6 | D | 75 | (Sweden) Pontus Mörth | 5 |
| (Sweden) Team Eurotech Scandinavian | Porsche 911 GT3-RS | Porsche 3.6 L Flat-6 | D | 75 | (Norway) Thomas Faraas | 5 |
| (Germany) RWS Motorsport | Porsche 911 GT3-R | Porsche 3.6 L Flat-6 | P | 76 | (Spain) Antonio García | 4–6, 8–9 |
| (Germany) RWS Motorsport | Porsche 911 GT3-R | Porsche 3.6 L Flat-6 | P | 76 | (Germany) Hans Fertl | 4 |
| (Germany) RWS Motorsport | Porsche 911 GT3-R | Porsche 3.6 L Flat-6 | P | 76 | (Italy) Michele Merendino | 5 |
| (Germany) RWS Motorsport | Porsche 911 GT3-R | Porsche 3.6 L Flat-6 | P | 76 | (Austria) Horst Felbermayr Jr. | 6, 8–9 |
| (Germany) RWS Motorsport | Porsche 911 GT3-R | Porsche 3.6 L Flat-6 | P | 76 | (Austria) Philipp Peter | 7 |
| (Germany) RWS Motorsport | Porsche 911 GT3-R | Porsche 3.6 L Flat-6 | P | 76 | (Austria) Dieter Quester | 7 |
| (Germany) RWS Motorsport | Porsche 911 GT3-R | Porsche 3.6 L Flat-6 | P | 76 | (Austria) Toto Wolff | 7 |
| (Germany) RWS Motorsport | Porsche 911 GT3-R | Porsche 3.6 L Flat-6 | P | 76 | (Italy) Luca Riccitelli | 7 |
| (Germany) RWS Motorsport | Porsche 911 GT3-R | Porsche 3.6 L Flat-6 | P | 76 | (Germany) Norman Simon | 10 |
| (Germany) RWS Motorsport | Porsche 911 GT3-R | Porsche 3.6 L Flat-6 | P | 76 | (United Kingdom) Paul Knapfield | 10 |
| (Germany) RWS Motorsport | Porsche 911 GT3-R | Porsche 3.6 L Flat-6 | P | 77 | (Russia) Aleksey Vasilyev | All |
| (Germany) RWS Motorsport | Porsche 911 GT3-R | Porsche 3.6 L Flat-6 | P | 77 | (Russia) Nikolai Fomenko | All |
| (Germany) RWS Motorsport | Porsche 911 GT3-R | Porsche 3.6 L Flat-6 | P | 77 | (Spain) Jesús Diaz de Villarroel | 7 |
| (Germany) RWS Motorsport | Porsche 911 GT3-R | Porsche 3.6 L Flat-6 | P | 77 | (Spain) Antonio García | 7 |
| (Germany) Seikel Motorsport | Porsche 911 GT3-RS | Porsche 3.6 L Flat-6 | Y | 78 | (Italy) Luca Drudi | 7 |
| (Germany) Seikel Motorsport | Porsche 911 GT3-RS | Porsche 3.6 L Flat-6 | Y | 78 | (Italy) Gabrio Rosa | 7 |
| (Germany) Seikel Motorsport | Porsche 911 GT3-RS | Porsche 3.6 L Flat-6 | Y | 78 | (New Zealand) Andrew Bagnall | 7 |
| (Germany) Seikel Motorsport | Porsche 911 GT3-RS | Porsche 3.6 L Flat-6 | Y | 78 | (United States) Philip Collin | 7 |
| (Switzerland) Swiss GT Racing | Porsche 911 GT3-R | Porsche 3.6 L Flat-6 | D | 80 | (France) Luc Alphand | 7 |
| (Switzerland) Swiss GT Racing | Porsche 911 GT3-R | Porsche 3.6 L Flat-6 | D | 80 | (France) Sylvain Noël | 7 |
| (Switzerland) Swiss GT Racing | Porsche 911 GT3-R | Porsche 3.6 L Flat-6 | D | 80 | (France) Christian Lavielle | 7 |
| (Switzerland) Swiss GT Racing | Porsche 911 GT3-R | Porsche 3.6 L Flat-6 | D | 80 | (France) Stéphane Echallard | 7 |
| (Switzerland) Swiss GT Racing | Porsche 911 GT3-R | Porsche 3.6 L Flat-6 | D | 81 | (Belgium) Alain Corbisier | 7 |
| (Switzerland) Swiss GT Racing | Porsche 911 GT3-R | Porsche 3.6 L Flat-6 | D | 81 | (Belgium) Luc Pensis | 7 |
| (Switzerland) Swiss GT Racing | Porsche 911 GT3-R | Porsche 3.6 L Flat-6 | D | 81 | (Belgium) Steve Van Bellingen | 7 |
| (United Kingdom) Team Veloqx | Ferrari 360 Modena N-GT; Ferrari 360 Modena GT | Ferrari 3.6 L V8 | D | 82 | (United Kingdom) Jamie Davies | 9–10 |
| (United Kingdom) Team Veloqx | Ferrari 360 Modena N-GT; Ferrari 360 Modena GT | Ferrari 3.6 L V8 | D | 82 | (Italy) Ivan Capelli | 9–10 |
| (United Kingdom) Team Veloqx | Ferrari 360 Modena N-GT; Ferrari 360 Modena GT | Ferrari 3.6 L V8 | D | 83 | (United Kingdom) Andrew Kirkaldy | 9–10 |
| (United Kingdom) Team Veloqx | Ferrari 360 Modena N-GT; Ferrari 360 Modena GT | Ferrari 3.6 L V8 | D | 83 | (United Kingdom) Tim Sugden | 9–10 |
| (Italy) Mastercar | Ferrari 360 Modena | Ferrari 3.6 L V8 | D | 84 | (Italy) Franco Bertoli | 8 |
| (Italy) Mastercar | Ferrari 360 Modena | Ferrari 3.6 L V8 | D | 84 | (Italy) Santi Di Fillipis | 8 |
| (Italy) Mastercar | Ferrari 360 Modena | Ferrari 3.6 L V8 | D | 84 | (Italy) Carlo Commis | 8 |
| (United Kingdom) Team Eurotech | Porsche 911 GT3-R | Porsche 3.6 L Flat-6 | D | 88 | (United Kingdom) Mike Jordan | 9 |
| (United Kingdom) Team Eurotech | Porsche 911 GT3-R | Porsche 3.6 L Flat-6 | D | 88 | (United Kingdom) Mark Sumpter | 9 |
| (United Kingdom) Team Eurotech | Porsche 911 GT3-R | Porsche 3.6 L Flat-6 | D | 89 | (United Kingdom) David Jones | 9 |
| (United Kingdom) Team Eurotech | Porsche 911 GT3-R | Porsche 3.6 L Flat-6 | D | 89 | (United Kingdom) Godfrey Jones | 9 |

== Results and standings ==
=== Race results ===
| Rnd | Circuit | GT Winning Team | N-GT Winning Team | Report |
| Rnd | Circuit | GT Winning Drivers | N-GT Winning Drivers | Report |
|---|---|---|---|---|
| 1 | Magny-Cours | (United Kingdom) No. 14 Lister Storm Racing | (France) No. 50 JMB Racing | Report |
| 1 | Magny-Cours | (United Kingdom) Jamie Campbell-Walter (Germany) Nicolaus Springer | (Italy) Christian Pescatori (Italy) Andrea Montermini | Report |
| 2 | Silverstone | (France) No. 12 Paul Belmondo Racing | (France) No. 50 JMB Racing | Report |
| 2 | Silverstone | (Italy) Fabio Babini (Belgium) Marc Duez | (Italy) Christian Pescatori (Italy) Andrea Montermini | Report |
| 3 | Brno | (United Kingdom) No. 14 Lister Storm Racing | (Germany) No. 54 Freisinger Motorsport | Report |
| 3 | Brno | (United Kingdom) Jamie Campbell-Walter (Germany) Nicolaus Springer | (Germany) Marc Lieb (Monaco) Stéphane Ortelli | Report |
| 4 | Jarama | (Italy) No. 23 BMS Scuderia Italia | (Germany) No. 54 Freisinger Motorsport | Report |
| 4 | Jarama | (Italy) Andrea Piccini (Switzerland) Jean-Denis Délétraz | (Germany) Sascha Maassen (Monaco) Stéphane Ortelli | Report |
| 5 | Anderstorp | (Italy) No. 23 BMS Scuderia Italia | (Germany) No. 54 Freisinger Motorsport | Report |
| 5 | Anderstorp | (Italy) Andrea Piccini (Switzerland) Jean-Denis Délétraz | (France) Emmanuel Collard (Monaco) Stéphane Ortelli | Report |
| 6 | Oschersleben | (Italy) No. 23 BMS Scuderia Italia | (Italy) No. 58 Autorlando Sport | Report |
| 6 | Oschersleben | (Italy) Andrea Piccini (Switzerland) Jean-Denis Délétraz | (Austria) Toto Wolff (Austria) Philipp Peter | Report |
| 7 | Spa | (France) No. 1 Larbre Compétition-Chereau | (Germany) No. 54 Freisinger Motorsport | Report |
| 7 | Spa | (France) Christophe Bouchut (France) Sébastien Bourdais (France) David Terrien (Belgium) Vincent Vosse | (Monaco) Stéphane Ortelli (France) Emmanuel Collard (France) Romain Dumas | Report |
| 8 | Pergusa | (United Kingdom) No. 14 Lister Storm Racing | (Germany) No. 54 Freisinger Motorsport | Report |
| 8 | Pergusa | (United Kingdom) Jamie Campbell-Walter (Germany) Nicolaus Springer | (Germany) Marc Lieb (Monaco) Stéphane Ortelli | Report |
| 9 | Donington | (Netherlands) No. 3 Team Carsport Holland | (Germany) No. 54 Freisinger Motorsport | Report |
| 9 | Donington | (Netherlands) Mike Hezemans (Belgium) Anthony Kumpen | (Monaco) Stéphane Ortelli (France) Romain Dumas | Report |
| 10 | Estoril | (Italy) No. 23 BMS Scuderia Italia | (Germany) No. 54 Freisinger Motorsport | Report |
| 10 | Estoril | (Italy) Andrea Piccini (Switzerland) Jean-Denis Délétraz | (Germany) Sascha Maassen (Monaco) Stéphane Ortelli | Report |

Points were awarded to the top six finishers in each category. Entries were required to complete 75% of the race distance in order to be classified as a finisher and earn points. Drivers were required to complete 20% of the total race distance for their car to earn points. Teams scored points for all cars that finished a race. For the Spa 24 Hours, half points were awarded to the top six in each category at the end of six and twelve hours of the race; full points were then awarded at the race's end.

Points system
| Event | 1st | 2nd | 3rd | 4th | 5th | 6th |
|---|---|---|---|---|---|---|
| Races | 10 | 6 | 4 | 3 | 2 | 1 |
| Spa 6 and 12 hours | 5 | 3 | 2 | 1.5 | 1 | 0.5 |

=== Driver championships ===
==== GT Championship ====
The GT Drivers Championship was won by Christophe Bouchut driving a Larbre Compétition-Chereau Chrysler Viper GTS-R.

| Pos. | Driver | Team | MAG (France) | SIL (United Kingdom) | BRN (Czech Republic) | JAR (Spain) | AND (Sweden) | OSC (Germany) | SPA (Belgium) | PER (Italy) | DON (United Kingdom) | EST (Portugal) | Total points |
|---|---|---|---|---|---|---|---|---|---|---|---|---|---|
| 1 | (France) Christophe Bouchut | (France) Larbre Compétition-Chereau | 3 | 3 | 2 | 3 | 2 | Ret | 1 | 5 | Ret | 4 | 49 |
| 2 | (France) David Terrien | (France) Larbre Compétition-Chereau | 3 | 3 | 2 | 3 | 2 | Ret | 1 | 5 | 5 | Ret | 48 |
| 3 | (United Kingdom) Jamie Campbell-Walter | (United Kingdom) Lister Storm Racing | 1 | 4 | 1 | 6 | Ret | 2 | Ret | 1 | 7 | 3 | 46.5 |
| 3 | (Germany) Nicolaus Springer | (United Kingdom) Lister Storm Racing | 1 | 4 | 1 | 6 | Ret | 2 | Ret | 1 | 7 | 3 | 46.5 |
| 4 | (Italy) Andrea Piccini | (Italy) BMS Scuderia Italia | 6 | Ret | Ret | 1 | 1 | 1 | Ret | 10 | Ret | 1 | 41 |
| 4 | (Switzerland) Jean-Denis Délétraz | (Italy) BMS Scuderia Italia | 6 | Ret | Ret | 1 | 1 | 1 | Ret | 10 | Ret | 1 | 41 |
| 5 | (Belgium) Vincent Vosse | (France) Larbre Compétition-Chereau | 5 | 3 | 4 | 4 | 6 | 4 | 1 | 8 | Ret | 4 | 39 |
| 6 | (Belgium) Anthony Kumpen | (Netherlands) Team Carsport Holland | 2 | Ret | 9 | 2 | 3 | 9 | Ret | 6 | 1 | 2 | 36 |
| 6 | (Netherlands) Mike Hezemans | (Netherlands) Team Carsport Holland | 2 | Ret | 9 | 2 | 3 | 9 | Ret | 6 | 1 | 2 | 36 |
| 7 | (Italy) Fabio Babini | (France) Paul Belmondo Racing | Ret | 1 | 5 | 11 | Ret | 3 | 4 | 3 | 3 | 6 | 33 |
| 8 | (Belgium) Marc Duez | (France) Paul Belmondo Racing | Ret | 1 | 5 | 11 | Ret | 3 | 4 | 3 | Ret | | 28 |
| 9 | (Italy) Fabrizio Gollin | (Netherlands) Team Carsport Holland | 4 | 5 | 3 | Ret | 4 | 5 | Ret | 2 | 4 | 13 | 23 |
| 9 | (Italy) Luca Cappellari | (Netherlands) Team Carsport Holland | 4 | 5 | 3 | Ret | 4 | 5 | Ret | 2 | 4 | 13 | 23 |
| 10 | (France) Sébastien Bourdais | (France) Larbre Compétition-Chereau | | | | | | | 1 | | | Ret | 20 |
| 11 | (Sweden) Carl Rosenblad | (France) Larbre Compétition-Chereau | 5 | | 4 | 4 | 6 | 4 | 3 | 8 | 5 | Ret | 18.5 |
| 12 | (United Kingdom) Bobby Verdon-Roe | (United Kingdom) Lister Storm Racing | Ret | 2 | Ret | Ret | Ret | 6 | 2 | 7 | Ret | 11 | 16.5 |
| 13 | (France) Boris Derichebourg | (France) Paul Belmondo Racing | | | | | | | 4 | 4 | | | 11 |
| 14 | (France) Paul Belmondo | (France) Paul Belmondo Racing | 7 | 6 | 6 | 5 | 7 | 7 | 5 | 4 | | Ret | 10.5 |
| 15 | (Switzerland) Enzo Calderari | (Italy) BMS Scuderia Italia | Ret | 10 | Ret | Ret | 5 | | Ret | 9 | 2 | 5 | 10 |
| 15 | (Switzerland) Lilian Bryner | (Italy) BMS Scuderia Italia | Ret | 10 | Ret | Ret | 5 | | Ret | 9 | 2 | 5 | 10 |
| 16 | (Spain) Miguel Ángel de Castro | (United Kingdom) Lister Storm Racing | | | | | | | 2 | 7 | | | 9.5 |
| 17 | (United Kingdom) Justin Law | (United Kingdom) Lister Storm Racing | | | | | | | 2 | | | | 9.5 |
| 17 | (Belgium) David Sterckx | (United Kingdom) Lister Storm Racing | | | | | | | 2 | | | | 9.5 |
| 18 | (France) Jean-Marc Gounon | (Italy) BMS Scuderia Italia | | | | | | | | 9 | 2 | 5 | 8 |
| 19 | (United Kingdom) Paul Knapfield | (United Kingdom) Lister Storm Racing | Ret | 2 | Ret | Ret | Ret | 6 | | | | | 7 |
| 20 | (France) Claude-Yves Gosselin | (France) Paul Belmondo Racing | 7 | 6 | | 5 | 7 | 7 | 5 | | Ret | Ret | 6.5 |
| 21 | (Portugal) Ni Amorim | (France) Paul Belmondo Racing | | | | | | | | | 3 | 6 | 5 |
| 22 | (France) Jean-Luc Chéreau | (France) Larbre Compétition-Chereau | | | | | | | 3 | | | | 4.5 |
| 22 | (France) Jean-Cluade Lagniez | (France) Larbre Compétition-Chereau | | | | | | | 3 | | | | 4.5 |
| 22 | (Belgium) Didier Defourny | (France) Larbre Compétition-Chereau | | | | | | | 3 | | | | 4.5 |
| 23 | (Japan) Ryō Fukuda | (France) Paul Belmondo Racing | | | | | | | 5 | | | | 3.5 |
| 24 | (Belgium) Thierry Tassin | (Netherlands) Team Carsport Holland | | | | | | | Ret | | | | 3 |
| 25 | (United Kingdom) Andy Wallace | (United Kingdom) Lister Storm Racing | | | | | | | Ret | | | | 2.5 |
| 25 | (Belgium) Eric van de Poele | (United Kingdom) Lister Storm Racing | | | | | | | Ret | | | | 2.5 |
| 26 | (Germany) Gerold Ried | (Germany) Proton Competition | 8 | Ret | 7 | 10 | 11 | 8 | Ret | Ret | 6 | 12 | 1 |
| 27 | (Italy) Mauro Casadei | (Germany) Proton Competition | 8 | | 7 | | | | | | 6 | | 1 |
| 28 | (Germany) Christian Ried | (Germany) Proton Competition | | | | 10 | 11 | 8 | Ret | Ret | 6 | 12 | 1 |
| 29 | (Belgium) Robert Dierick | (France) Paul Belmondo Racing | | | 6 | | | | | | | | 1 |
| Pos. | Driver | Team | MAG (France) | SIL (United Kingdom) | BRN (Czech Republic) | JAR (Spain) | AND (Sweden) | OSC (Germany) | SPA (Belgium) | PER (Italy) | DON (United Kingdom) | EST (Portugal) | Total points |

| Colour | Result |
|---|---|
| Gold | Winner |
| Silver | Second place |
| Bronze | Third place |
| Green | Points classification |
| Blue | Non-points classification |
| Blue | Non-classified finish (NC) |
| Purple | Retired, not classified (Ret) |
| Red | Did not qualify (DNQ) |
| Red | Did not pre-qualify (DNPQ) |
| Black | Disqualified (DSQ) |
| White | Did not start (DNS) |
| White | Withdrew (WD) |
| White | Race cancelled (C) |
| Blank | Did not practice (DNP) |
| Blank | Did not arrive (DNA) |
| Blank | Excluded (EX) |

==== N-GT Cup ====
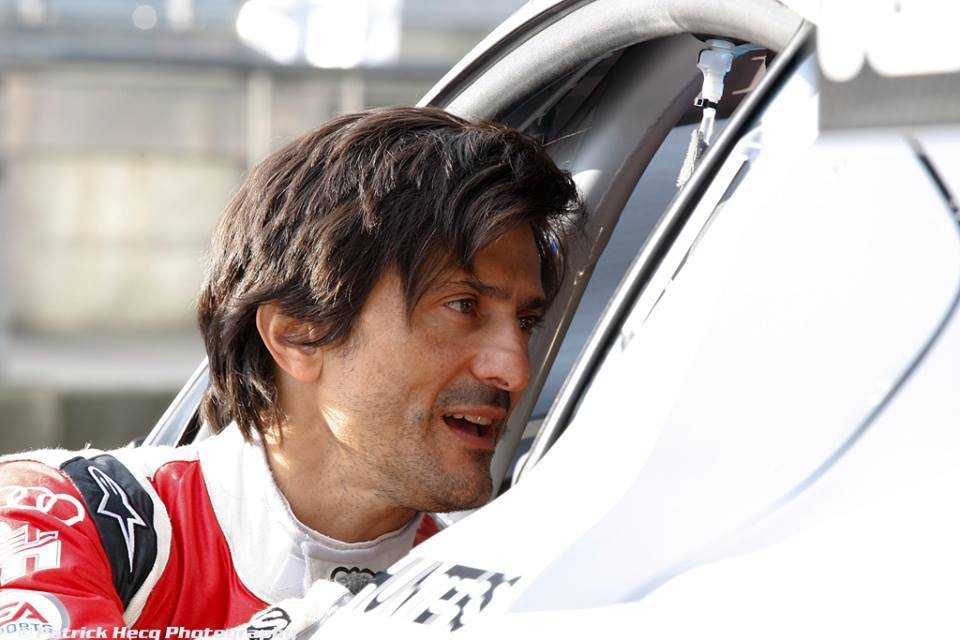
Stéphane Ortelli won the N-GT Cup for Drivers with seven victories

The N-GT Drivers title was won by Stéphane Ortelli driving a Freisinger Motorsport Porsche 911 GT3-RS.

| Pos. | Driver | Team | MAG (France) | SIL (United Kingdom) | BRN (Czech Republic) | JAR (Spain) | AND (Sweden) | OSC (Germany) | SPA (Belgium) | PER (Italy) | DON (United Kingdom) | EST (Portugal) | Total points |
|---|---|---|---|---|---|---|---|---|---|---|---|---|---|
| 1 | (Monaco) Stéphane Ortelli | (Germany) Freisinger Motorsport | DSQ | 7 | 1 | 1 | 1 | Ret | 1 | 1 | 1 | 1 | 80 |
| 2 | (Italy) Christian Pescatori | (France) JMB Racing | 1 | 1 | 2 | 2 | 4 | 7 | 2 | 4 | 3 | 4 | 55.5 |
| 3 | (Italy) Andrea Montermini | (France) JMB Racing | 1 | 1 | 2 | 2 | 4 | 7 | 2 | 3 | Ret | 9 | 49.5 |
| 4 | (Italy) Andrea Bertolini | (France) JMB Racing | 3 | 3 | Ret | 4 | 2 | 3 | 2 | 4 | 3 | 4 | 41.5 |
| 5 | (France) Romain Dumas | (Germany) Freisinger Motorsport | | | | | | | 1 | | 1 | | 36 |
| 5 | (France) Romain Dumas | (United Kingdom) Cirtek Motorsport | | | | | | | | | | 2 | 36 |
| 6 | (Austria) Toto Wolff | (Italy) Autorlando Sport | 5 | 2 | 3 | 7 | 3 | 1 | | Ret | 5 | 7 | 31.5 |
| 6 | (Austria) Toto Wolff | (Germany) RWS Motorsport | | | | | | | Ret | | | | 31.5 |
| 7 | (Italy) Andrea Garbagnati | (France) JMB Racing | 3 | 3 | Ret | 4 | 2 | 3 | 2 | | | 9 | 31.5 |
| 7 | (Italy) Andrea Garbagnati | (France) JMB Competition | | | | | | | | 8 | Ret | | 31.5 |
| 8 | (France) Emmanuel Collard | (Germany) Freisinger Motorsport | | | | | 1 | | 1 | | | | 30 |
| 9 | (Germany) Marc Lieb | (Germany) Freisinger Motorsport | | | 1 | | | | 3 | 1 | | | 29 |
| 10 | (Austria) Philipp Peter | (Italy) Autorlando Sport | 5 | | 3 | 7 | | 1 | | Ret | 5 | 7 | 21.5 |
| 10 | (Austria) Philipp Peter | (Germany) RWS Motorsport | | | | | | | Ret | | | | 21.5 |
| 11 | (Germany) Sascha Maassen | (Germany) Freisinger Motorsport | | | | 1 | | Ret | | | | 1 | 20 |
| 12 | (United Kingdom) Ian Khan | (Germany) JVG Racing | 2 | 4 | 4 | 6 | Ret | 6 | | | 4 | 5 | 19 |
| 13 | (Spain) Antonio García | (Germany) RWS Motorsport | | | | 3 | 14 | 2 | 8 | 5 | 2 | | 18 |
| 14 | (France) Stéphane Daoudi | (Germany) Freisinger Motorsport | 7 | 5 | 9 | 5 | 10 | 4 | | 2 | Ret | 6 | 17.5 |
| 14 | (France) Stéphane Daoudi | (United Kingdom) Cirtek Motorsport | | | | | | | 4 | | | | 17.5 |
| 15 | (Belgium) Bert Longin | (Germany) Freisinger Motorsport | | 5 | 9 | 5 | 10 | 4 | 3 | | | 6 | 17 |
| 16 | (Austria) Horst Felbermayr Jr. | (Germany) RWS Motorsport | | | | | | 2 | | 5 | 2 | | 14 |
| 17 | (Germany) Jürgen von Gartzen | (Germany) JVG Racing | 2 | 4 | 4 | 6 | Ret | 6 | | | | | 14 |
| 18 | (United Kingdom) Johnny Mowlem | (Italy) Autorlando Sport | | 2 | | | | | | | | | 11 |
| 18 | (United Kingdom) Johnny Mowlem | (Germany) JVG Racing | | | | | | | | | 4 | 5 | 11 |
| 19 | (Germany) André Lotterer | (Germany) Freisinger Motorsport | | | | | | | 3 | | | | 9 |
| 19 | (France) Georges Forgeois | (Germany) Freisinger Motorsport | | | | | | | 3 | | | | 9 |
| 20 | (United Kingdom) Adam Jones | (United Kingdom) Cirtek Motorsport | | Ret | | | | | | 6 | 9 | 2 | 7 |
| 21 | (France) Cyrille Sauvage | (Germany) Freisinger Motorsport | | | | | | | | 2 | Ret | | 6 |
| 22 | (Switzerland) Iradj Alexander | (France) JMB Competition | 6 | 6 | | 12 | 12 | 8 | | | | Ret | 5 |
| 22 | (Switzerland) Iradj Alexander | (France) JMB Racing | | | | | | | Ret | 3 | Ret | | 5 |
| 23 | (Germany) Hans Fertl | (United Kingdom) Cirtek Motorsport | Ret | | | | | | | | | | 4 |
| 23 | (Germany) Hans Fertl | (Germany) RWS Motorsport | | | | 3 | | | | | | | 4 |
| 23 | (United Kingdom) Tim Sugden | (United Kingdom) Team Veloqx | | | | | | | | | Ret | 3 | 4 |
| 23 | (United Kingdom) Andrew Kirkaldy | (United Kingdom) Team Veloqx | | | | | | | | | Ret | 3 | 4 |
| 24 | (Austria) Walter Lechner Jr. | (Italy) Autorlando Sport | | | | | 3 | | | | | | 4 |
| 25 | (United States) Vic Rice | (United Kingdom) Cirtek Motorsport | | | | | | | 4 | | | | 3.5 |
| 25 | (France) Julien Piquet | (United Kingdom) Cirtek Motorsport | | | | | | | 4 | | | | 3.5 |
| 25 | (Austria) Manfred Jurasz | (United Kingdom) Cirtek Motorsport | | | | | | | 4 | | | | 3.5 |
| 26 | (Italy) Pietro Gianni | (France) JMB Competition | 4 | DNS | | Ret | 13 | Ret | | 8 | Ret | Ret | 3 |
| 27 | (Italy) Gianluca Giraudi | (France) JMB Competition | 4 | DNS | | Ret | | | | | | | 3 |
| 28 | (Italy) Batti Pregliasco | (France) JMB Competition | 6 | 6 | 5 | 12 | | 8 | Ret | 9 | 7 | DNS | 3 |
| 29 | (Italy) Marco Lambertini | (France) JMB Competition | | 6 | 5 | 12 | | | | | | | 3 |
| 30 | (Italy) Raffaele Sangioulo | (United Kingdom) Cirtek Motorsport | Ret | Ret | | Ret | 6 | 5 | Ret | | | | 3 |
| 30 | (Italy) Raffaele Sangioulo | (Italy) MAC Racing | | | | | | | | Ret | | | 3 |
| 30 | (Italy) Thomas Pichler | (United Kingdom) Cirtek Motorsport | | | | | 6 | 5 | | | | | 3 |
| 30 | (Italy) Thomas Pichler | (Italy) MAC Racing | | | | | | | | Ret | | | 3 |
| 31 | (Netherlands) Peter van Merksteijn | (Netherlands) System Force Motorsport | 9 | DSQ | 6 | 10 | | | Ret | | | | 3 |
| 31 | (Netherlands) Phil Bastiaans | (Netherlands) System Force Motorsport | 9 | DSQ | 6 | 10 | | | Ret | | | | 3 |
| 32 | (Italy) Luca Drudi | (Germany) Seikel Motorsport | | | | | | | 5 | | | | 2.5 |
| 32 | (Italy) Gabrio Rosa | (Germany) Seikel Motorsport | | | | | | | 5 | | | | 2.5 |
| 32 | (New Zealand) Andrew Bagnall | (Germany) Seikel Motorsport | | | | | | | 5 | | | | 2.5 |
| 32 | (United States) Philip Collin | (Germany) Seikel Motorsport | | | | | | | 5 | | | | 2.5 |
| 33 | (United Kingdom) Robin Liddell | (United Kingdom) Cirtek Motorsport | | | | | 5 | | | | | | 2 |
| 33 | (Denmark) John Nielsen | (United Kingdom) Cirtek Motorsport | | | | | 5 | | | | | | 2 |
| 34 | (Belgium) Stéphane Vancampenhoudt | (Netherlands) System Force Motorsport | | | | | | | Ret | | | | 2 |
| 35 | (Netherlands) Peter Kutemann | (France) JMB Competition | 6 | | | | 12 | 8 | | 9 | 7 | | 1 |
| 35 | (Netherlands) Peter Kutemann | (France) JMB Racing | | | | | | | Ret | | | | 1 |
| 36 | (Russia) Aleksey Vasilyev | (Germany) RWS Motorsport | 8 | 8 | 8 | Ret | 9 | 9 | 8 | 10 | 6 | Ret | 1 |
| 36 | (Russia) Nikolai Fomenko | (Germany) RWS Motorsport | 8 | 8 | 8 | Ret | 9 | 9 | 8 | 10 | 6 | Ret | 1 |
| 37 | (Italy) Moreno Soli | (Italy) MAC Racing | | | | 9 | | 10 | | | | | 1 |
| 37 | (Italy) Moreno Soli | (United Kingdom) Cirtek Motorsport | | | | | | | | 6 | | | 1 |
| 38 | (France) Pierre Bes | (Italy) MAC Racing | | | | | | | 6 | | | | 1 |
| 38 | (France) Marco Saviozzi | (Italy) MAC Racing | | | | | | | 6 | | | | 1 |
| 38 | (France) Emmanuel Moinel Delalande | (Italy) MAC Racing | | | | | | | 6 | | | | 1 |
| 38 | (France) Didier Moinel Delalande | (Italy) MAC Racing | | | | | | | 6 | | | | 1 |
| Pos. | Driver | Team | MAG (France) | SIL (United Kingdom) | BRN (Czech Republic) | JAR (Spain) | AND (Sweden) | OSC (Germany) | SPA (Belgium) | PER (Italy) | DON (United Kingdom) | EST (Portugal) | Total points |

=== Teams championships ===
==== GT Championship ====
| Pos. | Team | MAG (France) | SIL (United Kingdom) | BRN (Czech Republic) | JAR (Spain) | AND (Sweden) | OSC (Germany) | SPA (Belgium) | PER (Italy) | DON (United Kingdom) | EST (Portugal) | Total points |
|---|---|---|---|---|---|---|---|---|---|---|---|---|
| 1 | (France) Larbre Compétition-Chereau | 3 | 3 | 2 | 3 | 2 | 4 | 1 | 5 | 5 | 4 | 67.5 |
| 1 | (France) Larbre Compétition-Chereau | 5 | | 4 | 4 | 6 | Ret | 3 | 8 | Ret | Ret | 67.5 |
| 2 | (United Kingdom) Lister Storm Racing | 1 | 2 | 1 | 6 | Ret | 2 | 2 | 1 | 7 | 3 | 63 |
| 2 | (United Kingdom) Lister Storm Racing | Ret | 4 | Ret | Ret | Ret | 6 | Ret | 7 | Ret | 11 | 63 |
| 3 | (Netherlands) Team Carsport Holland | 2 | 5 | 3 | 2 | 3 | 5 | Ret | 2 | 1 | 2 | 59 |
| 3 | (Netherlands) Team Carsport Holland | 4 | Ret | 9 | Ret | 4 | 9 | Ret | 6 | 4 | 13 | 59 |
| 4 | (Italy) BMS Scuderia Italia | 6 | 10 | Ret | 1 | 1 | 1 | Ret | 9 | 2 | 1 | 51 |
| 4 | (Italy) BMS Scuderia Italia | Ret | Ret | Ret | Ret | 5 | | Ret | 10 | Ret | 5 | 51 |
| 5 | (France) Paul Belmondo Racing | 7 | 1 | 5 | 5 | 7 | 3 | 4 | 3 | 3 | 6 | 43.5 |
| 5 | (France) Paul Belmondo Racing | Ret | 6 | 6 | 11 | Ret | 7 | 5 | 4 | Ret | Ret | 43.5 |
| 6 | (Germany) Proton Competition | 8 | Ret | 7 | 9 | 11 | 8 | Ret | Ret | 6 | 12 | 1 |
| 6 | (Germany) Proton Competition | Ret | | NC | 10 | | Ret | | Ret | | Ret | 1 |
| - | (France) Team ART | Ret | 8 | Ret | 8 | 8 | | | | Ret | 7 | 0 |
| - | (Belgium) PSI Motorsport | | 12 | | 7 | 9 | | Ret | | | | 0 |
| - | (Germany) RWS Motorsport | Ret | 7 | 10 | | | | | | | | 0 |
| - | (Poland) Alda Motorsport | 9 | | 8 | | | | | | | | 0 |
| - | (Sweden) Henrik Roos Team | | | | | Ret | | | | 8 | | 0 |
| - | (Netherlands) Zwaan's Racing | | | | | | | | | | 8 | 0 |
| - | (Germany) Reiter Engineering | | | | | | | | Ret | | 9 | 0 |
| - | (United Kingdom) Cirtek Motorsport | | 9 | | | | | | | | | 0 |
| - | (France) Force One Racing | DNS | 11 | DNS | Ret | | Ret | Ret | | Ret | 10 | 0 |
| - | (Sweden) JPS Porsche Racing Team | | | | | 10 | | | | | | 0 |
| - | (France) DDO | | | | Ret | | | | | | | 0 |
| - | (Italy) Dart Racing | | | | | | | | Ret | Ret | Ret | 0 |

| Colour | Result |
|---|---|
| Gold | Winner |
| Silver | Second place |
| Bronze | Third place |
| Green | Points classification |
| Blue | Non-points classification |
| Blue | Non-classified finish (NC) |
| Purple | Retired, not classified (Ret) |
| Red | Did not qualify (DNQ) |
| Red | Did not pre-qualify (DNPQ) |
| Black | Disqualified (DSQ) |
| White | Did not start (DNS) |
| White | Withdrew (WD) |
| White | Race cancelled (C) |
| Blank | Did not practice (DNP) |
| Blank | Did not arrive (DNA) |
| Blank | Excluded (EX) |

==== N-GT Cup ====
| Pos. | Team | MAG (France) | SIL (United Kingdom) | BRN (Czech Republic) | JAR (Spain) | AND (Sweden) | OSC (Germany) | SPA (Belgium) | PER (Italy) | DON (United Kingdom) | EST (Portugal) | Total points |
|---|---|---|---|---|---|---|---|---|---|---|---|---|
| 1 | (Germany) Freisinger Motorsport | 7 | 5 | 1 | 1 | 1 | 4 | 1 | 1 | 1 | 1 | 103 |
| 1 | (Germany) Freisinger Motorsport | DSQ | 7 | 9 | 5 | 10 | Ret | 3 | 2 | Ret | 6 | 103 |
| 2 | (France) JMB Racing | 1 | 1 | 2 | 2 | 2 | 3 | 2 | 3 | 3 | 4 | 80.5 |
| 2 | (France) JMB Racing | 3 | 3 | Ret | 4 | 4 | 7 | Ret | 4 | Ret | 9 | 80.5 |
| 3 | (Italy) Autorlando Sport | 5 | 2 | 3 | 7 | 3 | 1 | Ret | Ret | 5 | 7 | 28 |
| 3 | (Italy) Autorlando Sport | | | | 8 | | | | | | | 28 |
| 4 | (Germany) RWS Motorsport | 8 | 8 | 8 | 3 | 9 | 2 | 8 | 5 | 2 | 8 | 22.5 |
| 4 | (Germany) RWS Motorsport | | | | Ret | 14 | 9 | Ret | 10 | 6 | Ret | 22.5 |
| 5 | (Germany) JVG Racing | 2 | 4 | 4 | 6 | Ret | 6 | | Ret | 4 | 5 | 19 |
| 6 | (United Kingdom) Cirtek Motorsport | 10 | Ret | 7 | 11 | 5 | 5 | 4 | 6 | 9 | 2 | 15.5 |
| 6 | (United Kingdom) Cirtek Motorsport | Ret | Ret | | Ret | 6 | | Ret | | 11 | 10 | 15.5 |
| 7 | (France) JMB Competition | 4 | 6 | 5 | 12 | 12 | 8 | Ret | 8 | 7 | Ret | 7 |
| 7 | (France) JMB Competition | 6 | DNS | | Ret | 13 | Ret | | 9 | Ret | DNS | 7 |
| 8 | (United Kingdom) Team Veloqx | | | | | | | | | 12 | 3 | 4 |
| 8 | (United Kingdom) Team Veloqx | | | | | | | | | Ret | Ret | 4 |
| 9 | (Netherlands) System Force Racing | 9 | DSQ | 6 | 10 | | | Ret | | | | 3 |
| 10 | (Germany) Seikel Motorsport | | | | | | | 5 | | | | 2.5 |
| 11 | (Italy) MAC Racing | | Ret | | 9 | | 10 | 6 | 7 | | | 1 |
| 11 | (Italy) MAC Racing | | | | Ret | | 11 | | Ret | | | 1 |
| - | (Sweden) Podium Racing | | | | | 7 | | | | | | 0 |
| - | (Sweden) Podium Racing | | | | | 8 | | | | | | 0 |
| - | (Switzerland) Swiss GT Racing | | | | | | | 7 | | | | 0 |
| - | (Switzerland) Swiss GT Racing | | | | | | | Ret | | | | 0 |
| - | (United Kingdom) Team Eurotech | | | | | | | | | 8 | | 0 |
| - | (United Kingdom) Team Eurotech | | | | | | | | | 10 | | 0 |
| - | (Czech Republic) Sport Team NH Car | | | 10 | | | | | | | | 0 |
| - | (Slovakia) Malchárek Racing | | | 11 | | | | | | | | 0 |
| - | (Sweden) Team Eurotech Scandinavian | | | | | 11 | | | | | | 0 |
| - | (Italy) Mastercar | | | | | | | | 11 | | | 0 |
| - | (United Kingdom) Sebah Automotive | | Ret | | | | | | | | | 0 |
| - | (Czech Republic) Vonka Racing | | | Ret | | | | | | | | 0 |
| - | (United Kingdom) EMKA Racing | | | | | | | | | Ret | | 0 |
| - | (United Kingdom) Cirtek Racing | | | | | | | | | DNS | Ret | 0 |

== Bibliography ==
- Asselberghs, Denis; Richardson, Frederic (2002). 2002 FIA GT Championship Annual. Brussels: Apach Media. ISBN 978-2930354149.
