= 2002 FIA GT Pergusa 500km =

8th race of the 2002 FIA GT Championship

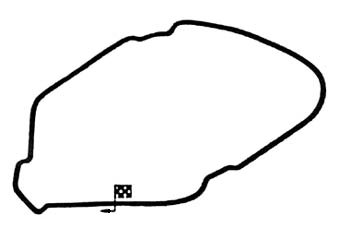
Layout of the Autodromo di Pergusa

The 2002 FIA GT Pergusa 500 km was the eighth round the 2002 FIA GT Championship season. It took place at the Autodromo di Pergusa, Italy, on 22 September 2002.

== Official results ==
Class winners in bold. Cars failing to complete 70% of winner's distance marked as Not Classified (NC).

Pos	Class	No	Team	Drivers	Chassis	Tyre	Laps
Pos	Class	No	Team	Drivers	Engine	Tyre	Laps
1	**GT**	**14**	**(United Kingdom) Lister Storm Racing**	**(United Kingdom) Jamie Campbell-Walter (Germany) Nicolaus Springer**	**Lister Storm**	D	**101**
1	**GT**	**14**	**(United Kingdom) Lister Storm Racing**	**(United Kingdom) Jamie Campbell-Walter (Germany) Nicolaus Springer**	**Jaguar 7.0L V12**	D	**101**
2	GT	4	(Netherlands) Team Carsport Holland (Italy) Racing Box	(Italy) Fabrizio Gollin (Italy) Luca Cappellari	Chrysler Viper GTS-R	P	101
2	GT	4	(Netherlands) Team Carsport Holland (Italy) Racing Box	(Italy) Fabrizio Gollin (Italy) Luca Cappellari	Chrysler 8.0L V10	P	101
3	GT	12	(France) Paul Belmondo Racing	(Italy) Fabio Babini (Belgium) Marc Duez	Chrysler Viper GTS-R	P	101
3	GT	12	(France) Paul Belmondo Racing	(Italy) Fabio Babini (Belgium) Marc Duez	Chrysler 8.0L V10	P	101
4	GT	11	(France) Paul Belmondo Racing	(France) Paul Belmondo (France) Boris Derichebourg	Chrysler Viper GTS-R	P	101
4	GT	11	(France) Paul Belmondo Racing	(France) Paul Belmondo (France) Boris Derichebourg	Chrysler 8.0L V10	P	101
5	GT	1	(France) Larbre Compétition Chereau	(France) Christophe Bouchut (France) David Terrien	Chrysler Viper GTS-R	MI	100
5	GT	1	(France) Larbre Compétition Chereau	(France) Christophe Bouchut (France) David Terrien	Chrysler 8.0L V10	MI	100
6	GT	3	(Netherlands) Team Carsport Holland (Italy) Racing Box	(Netherlands) Mike Hezemans (Belgium) Anthony Kumpen	Chrysler Viper GTS-R	P	99
6	GT	3	(Netherlands) Team Carsport Holland (Italy) Racing Box	(Netherlands) Mike Hezemans (Belgium) Anthony Kumpen	Chrysler 8.0L V10	P	99
7	GT	15	(United Kingdom) Lister Storm Racing	(United Kingdom) Bobby Verdon-Roe (Spain) Miguel Ángel de Castro	Lister Storm	D	99
7	GT	15	(United Kingdom) Lister Storm Racing	(United Kingdom) Bobby Verdon-Roe (Spain) Miguel Ángel de Castro	Jaguar 7.0L V12	D	99
8	**N-GT**	**54**	**(Germany) Freisinger Motorsport**	**(Germany) Marc Lieb (Monaco) Stéphane Ortelli**	**Porsche 911 GT3-RS**	D	**99**
8	**N-GT**	**54**	**(Germany) Freisinger Motorsport**	**(Germany) Marc Lieb (Monaco) Stéphane Ortelli**	**Porsche 3.6L Flat-6**	D	**99**
9	N-GT	55	(Germany) Freisinger Motorsport	(France) Stéphane Daoudi (France) Cyrille Sauvage	Porsche 911 GT3-RS	D	99
9	N-GT	55	(Germany) Freisinger Motorsport	(France) Stéphane Daoudi (France) Cyrille Sauvage	Porsche 3.6L Flat-6	D	99
10	N-GT	51	(France) JMB Racing	(Italy) Andrea Montermini (Switzerland) Iradj Alexander	Ferrari 360 Modena N-GT	P	98
10	N-GT	51	(France) JMB Racing	(Italy) Andrea Montermini (Switzerland) Iradj Alexander	Ferrari 3.6L V8	P	98
11	N-GT	50	(France) JMB Racing	(Italy) Christian Pescatori (Italy) Andrea Bertolini	Ferrari 360 Modena N-GT	P	98
11	N-GT	50	(France) JMB Racing	(Italy) Christian Pescatori (Italy) Andrea Bertolini	Ferrari 3.6L V8	P	98
12	GT	2	(France) Larbre Compétition Chereau	(Belgium) Vincent Vosse (Sweden) Carl Rosenblad	Chrysler Viper GTS-R	MI	97
12	GT	2	(France) Larbre Compétition Chereau	(Belgium) Vincent Vosse (Sweden) Carl Rosenblad	Chrysler 8.0L V10	MI	97
13	N-GT	76	(Germany) RWS Motorsport	(Austria) Horst Flbermayr, Jr. (Spain) Antonio García	Porsche 911 GT3-R	P	97
13	N-GT	76	(Germany) RWS Motorsport	(Austria) Horst Flbermayr, Jr. (Spain) Antonio García	Porsche 3.6L Flat-6	P	97
14	N-GT	62	(United Kingdom) Cirtek Motorsport	(Italy) Moreno Soli (United Kingdom) Adam Jones	Porsche 911 GT3-RS	D	96
14	N-GT	62	(United Kingdom) Cirtek Motorsport	(Italy) Moreno Soli (United Kingdom) Adam Jones	Porsche 3.6L Flat-6	D	96
15	N-GT	70	(Italy) MAC Racing (Italy) Scuderia Veregra	(Italy) Domenico Guagliardo (Italy) Giovanni Ceraulo	Porsche 911 GT3-R	D	95
15	N-GT	70	(Italy) MAC Racing (Italy) Scuderia Veregra	(Italy) Domenico Guagliardo (Italy) Giovanni Ceraulo	Porsche 3.6L Flat-6	D	95
16	N-GT	52	(France) JMB Competition	(Italy) Pietro Gianni (France) Andrea Garbagnati	Ferrari 360 Modena N-GT	P	95
16	N-GT	52	(France) JMB Competition	(Italy) Pietro Gianni (France) Andrea Garbagnati	Ferrari 3.6L V8	P	95
17	N-GT	53	(France) JMB Competition	(Netherlands) Peter Kutemann (France) Batti Pregliasco	Ferrari 360 Modena N-GT	P	94
17	N-GT	53	(France) JMB Competition	(Netherlands) Peter Kutemann (France) Batti Pregliasco	Ferrari 3.6L V8	P	94
18	N-GT	77	(Germany) RWS Motorsport	(Russia) Alexey Vasilyev (Russia) Nikolai Fomenko	Porsche 911 GT3-R	P	91
18	N-GT	77	(Germany) RWS Motorsport	(Russia) Alexey Vasilyev (Russia) Nikolai Fomenko	Porsche 3.6L Flat-6	P	91
19	GT	22	(Italy) BMS Scuderia Italia	(France) Jean-Marc Gounon (Switzerland) Enzo Calderari (Switzerland) Lilian Bryner	Ferrari 550-GTS Maranello	MI	84
19	GT	22	(Italy) BMS Scuderia Italia	(France) Jean-Marc Gounon (Switzerland) Enzo Calderari (Switzerland) Lilian Bryner	Ferrari 5.9L V12	MI	84
20	GT	23	(Italy) BMS Scuderia Italia	(Italy) Andrea Piccini (Switzerland) Jean-Denis Délétraz	Ferrari 550-GTS Maranello	MI	81
20	GT	23	(Italy) BMS Scuderia Italia	(Italy) Andrea Piccini (Switzerland) Jean-Denis Délétraz	Ferrari 5.9L V12	MI	81
21	N-GT	84	(Italy) Mastercar	(Italy) Franco Bertoli (Italy) Santi Di Fillipis (Italy) Carlo Commis	Ferrari 360 Modena	D	81
21	N-GT	84	(Italy) Mastercar	(Italy) Franco Bertoli (Italy) Santi Di Fillipis (Italy) Carlo Commis	Ferrari 3.6L V8	D	81
22 DNF	GT	16	(Germany) Proton Competition	(Germany) Gerold Ried (Germany) Christian Ried	Porsche 911 GT2	Y	40
22 DNF	GT	16	(Germany) Proton Competition	(Germany) Gerold Ried (Germany) Christian Ried	Porsche 3.8L Turbo Flat-6	Y	40
23 DNF	N-GT	58	(Italy) Autorlando Sport	(Austria) Philipp Peter (Austria) Toto Wolff	Porsche 911 GT3-RS	P	34
23 DNF	N-GT	58	(Italy) Autorlando Sport	(Austria) Philipp Peter (Austria) Toto Wolff	Porsche 3.6L Flat-6	P	34
24 DNF	GT	31	(Germany) Reiter Engineering	(France) Emmanuel Clérico (United Kingdom) Oliver Gavin	Lamborghini Diablo GTR	P	31
24 DNF	GT	31	(Germany) Reiter Engineering	(France) Emmanuel Clérico (United Kingdom) Oliver Gavin	Lamborghini 6.0L V12	P	31
25 DNF	GT	32	(Italy) Dart Racing	(Italy) Luca Riccitelli (Austria) Dieter Quester	Ferrari 550 Maranello	P	22
25 DNF	GT	32	(Italy) Dart Racing	(Italy) Luca Riccitelli (Austria) Dieter Quester	Ferrari 6.0L V12	P	22
26 DNF	N-GT	66	(Italy) MAC Racing (Italy) Scuderia Veregra	(Italy) Raffaele Sangiuolo (Italy) Thomas Pichler	Porsche 911 GT3-R	D	18
26 DNF	N-GT	66	(Italy) MAC Racing (Italy) Scuderia Veregra	(Italy) Raffaele Sangiuolo (Italy) Thomas Pichler	Porsche 3.6L Flat-6	D	18
27 DNF	N-GT	60	(Germany) JVG Racing	(Italy) Michele Merendino (Italy) Francesco Merendino	Porsche 911 GT3-RS	P	10
27 DNF	N-GT	60	(Germany) JVG Racing	(Italy) Michele Merendino (Italy) Francesco Merendino	Porsche 3.6L Flat-6	P	10
28 DNF	GT	17	(Germany) Proton Competition	(Austria) Horst Felbermayr, Sr. (Austria) Manfred Jurasz (Italy) Mauro Casadei	Porsche 911 GT2	Y	0
28 DNF	GT	17	(Germany) Proton Competition	(Austria) Horst Felbermayr, Sr. (Austria) Manfred Jurasz (Italy) Mauro Casadei	Porsche 3.8L Turbo Flat-6	Y	0

== Statistics ==
- Pole position – #4 Team Carsport Holland – 1:35.633
- Fastest lap – #4 Team Carsport Holland – 1:36.594
- Average speed – 166.390 km/h

FIA GT Championship
Previous race: 2002 Spa 24 Hours	2002 season	Next race: 2002 FIA GT Donington 500km
