= 2002 FIA GT Magny-Cours 500km =

Motor race

Layout of the Circuit de Nevers Magny-Cours (1992-2002)

The 2002 FIA GT Magny-Cours 500 km was the opening round the 2002 FIA GT Championship season. It took place at the Circuit de Nevers Magny-Cours, France, on 21 April 2002.

== Official results ==
Class winners in bold. Cars failing to complete 70% of winner's distance marked as Not Classified (NC).

Pos	Class	No	Team	Drivers	Chassis	Tyre	Laps
Pos	Class	No	Team	Drivers	Engine	Tyre	Laps
1	**GT**	**14**	**(United Kingdom) Lister Storm Racing**	**(United Kingdom) Jamie Campbell-Walter (Germany) Nicolaus Springer**	**Lister Storm**	D	**108**
1	**GT**	**14**	**(United Kingdom) Lister Storm Racing**	**(United Kingdom) Jamie Campbell-Walter (Germany) Nicolaus Springer**	**Jaguar 7.0L V12**	D	**108**
2	GT	3	(Netherlands) Team Carsport Holland (Italy) Racing Box	(Netherlands) Mike Hezemans (Belgium) Anthony Kumpen	Chrysler Viper GTS-R	P	108
2	GT	3	(Netherlands) Team Carsport Holland (Italy) Racing Box	(Netherlands) Mike Hezemans (Belgium) Anthony Kumpen	Chrysler 8.0L V10	P	108
3	GT	1	(France) Larbre Compétition Chereau	(France) Christophe Bouchut (France) David Terrien	Chrysler Viper GTS-R	MI	108
3	GT	1	(France) Larbre Compétition Chereau	(France) Christophe Bouchut (France) David Terrien	Chrysler 8.0L V10	MI	108
4	GT	4	(Netherlands) Team Carsport Holland (Italy) Racing Box	(Italy) Fabrizio Gollin (Italy) Luca Cappellari	Chrysler Viper GTS-R	P	107
4	GT	4	(Netherlands) Team Carsport Holland (Italy) Racing Box	(Italy) Fabrizio Gollin (Italy) Luca Cappellari	Chrysler 8.0L V10	P	107
5	GT	2	(France) Larbre Compétition Chereau	(Belgium) Vincent Vosse (Sweden) Carl Rosenblad	Chrysler Viper GTS-R	MI	107
5	GT	2	(France) Larbre Compétition Chereau	(Belgium) Vincent Vosse (Sweden) Carl Rosenblad	Chrysler 8.0L V10	MI	107
6	GT	23	(Italy) BMS Scuderia Italia	(Italy) Andrea Piccini (Switzerland) Jean-Denis Délétraz	Ferrari 550-GTS Maranello	MI	106
6	GT	23	(Italy) BMS Scuderia Italia	(Italy) Andrea Piccini (Switzerland) Jean-Denis Délétraz	Ferrari 5.9L V12	MI	106
7	GT	11	(France) Paul Belmondo Racing	(France) Paul Belmondo (France) Claude-Yves Gosselin	Chrysler Viper GTS-R	P	104
7	GT	11	(France) Paul Belmondo Racing	(France) Paul Belmondo (France) Claude-Yves Gosselin	Chrysler 8.0L V10	P	104
8	**N-GT**	**50**	**(France) JMB Racing**	**(Italy) Christian Pescatori (Italy) Andrea Montermini**	**Ferrari 360 Modena N-GT**	P	**103**
8	**N-GT**	**50**	**(France) JMB Racing**	**(Italy) Christian Pescatori (Italy) Andrea Montermini**	**Ferrari 3.6L V8**	P	**103**
9	N-GT	60	(Germany) JVG Racing	(Germany) Jürgen von Gartzen (United Kingdom) Ian Khan	Porsche 911 GT3-RS	P	102
9	N-GT	60	(Germany) JVG Racing	(Germany) Jürgen von Gartzen (United Kingdom) Ian Khan	Porsche 3.6L Flat-6	P	102
10	N-GT	51	(France) JMB Racing	(Italy) Andrea Bertolini (Italy) Andrea Garbagnati	Ferrari 360 Modena N-GT	P	102
10	N-GT	51	(France) JMB Racing	(Italy) Andrea Bertolini (Italy) Andrea Garbagnati	Ferrari 3.6L V8	P	102
11	N-GT	52	(France) JMB Competition	(Italy) Gianluca Giraudi (Italy) Pietro Gianni	Ferrari 360 Modena N-GT	P	102
11	N-GT	52	(France) JMB Competition	(Italy) Gianluca Giraudi (Italy) Pietro Gianni	Ferrari 3.6L V8	P	102
12	N-GT	58	(Italy) Autorlando Sport	(Austria) Philipp Peter (Austria) Toto Wolff	Porsche 911 GT3-RS	P	101
12	N-GT	58	(Italy) Autorlando Sport	(Austria) Philipp Peter (Austria) Toto Wolff	Porsche 3.6L Flat-6	P	101
13	N-GT	53	(France) JMB Competition	(Netherlands) Peter Kutemann (Italy) Batti Pregliasco (Switzerland) Iradj Alexander	Ferrari 360 Modena N-GT	P	100
13	N-GT	53	(France) JMB Competition	(Netherlands) Peter Kutemann (Italy) Batti Pregliasco (Switzerland) Iradj Alexander	Ferrari 3.6L V8	P	100
14	N-GT	55	(Germany) Freisinger Motorsport	(France) Stéphane Daoudi (Slovakia) Jirko Malchárek	Porsche 911 GT3-RS	D	100
14	N-GT	55	(Germany) Freisinger Motorsport	(France) Stéphane Daoudi (Slovakia) Jirko Malchárek	Porsche 3.6L Flat-6	D	100
15	N-GT	77	(Germany) RWS Motorsport	(Russia) Alexey Vasilyev (Russia) Nikolai Fomenko	Porsche 911 GT3-R	P	99
15	N-GT	77	(Germany) RWS Motorsport	(Russia) Alexey Vasilyev (Russia) Nikolai Fomenko	Porsche 3.6L Flat-6	P	99
16	N-GT	63	(Netherlands) System Force Motorsport	(Netherlands) Phil Bastiaans (Netherlands) Peter Van Merksteijn	Porsche 911 GT3-RS	P	98
16	N-GT	63	(Netherlands) System Force Motorsport	(Netherlands) Phil Bastiaans (Netherlands) Peter Van Merksteijn	Porsche 3.6L Flat-6	P	98
17	N-GT	64	(United Kingdom) Cirtek Motorsport	(France) Jean-Luc Blanchemain (France) Marco Saviozzi (France) Thomas Leriche	Porsche 911 GT3-R	D	97
17	N-GT	64	(United Kingdom) Cirtek Motorsport	(France) Jean-Luc Blanchemain (France) Marco Saviozzi (France) Thomas Leriche	Porsche 3.6L Flat-6	D	97
18	GT	16	(Germany) Proton Competition	(Germany) Gerold Ried (Austria) Manfred Jurasz (Italy) Mauro Casadei	Porsche 911 GT2	Y	97
18	GT	16	(Germany) Proton Competition	(Germany) Gerold Ried (Austria) Manfred Jurasz (Italy) Mauro Casadei	Porsche 3.6L Turbo Flat-6	Y	97
19	GT	24	(Poland) Alda Motorsport	(Poland) Maciej Stanco (Poland) Wojciech Dobrzanski (Poland) Andrzej Dziurka	Porsche 911 GT2	D	94
19	GT	24	(Poland) Alda Motorsport	(Poland) Maciej Stanco (Poland) Wojciech Dobrzanski (Poland) Andrzej Dziurka	Porsche 3.8L Turbo Flat-6	D	94
20 DNF	GT	9	(France) Team A.R.T.	(France) Jean-Pierre Jarier (France) François Lafon	Chrysler Viper GTS-R	P	65
20 DNF	GT	9	(France) Team A.R.T.	(France) Jean-Pierre Jarier (France) François Lafon	Chrysler 8.0L V10	P	65
21 DNF	GT	17	(Germany) Proton Competition	(Austria) Horst Felbermayr, Sr. (Austria) Horst Felbermayr, Jr.	Porsche 911 GT2	Y	65
21 DNF	GT	17	(Germany) Proton Competition	(Austria) Horst Felbermayr, Sr. (Austria) Horst Felbermayr, Jr.	Porsche 3.6L Turbo Flat-6	Y	65
22 DNF	GT	15	(United Kingdom) Lister Storm Racing	(United Kingdom) Bobby Verdon-Roe (United Kingdom) Paul Knapfield	Lister Storm	D	63
22 DNF	GT	15	(United Kingdom) Lister Storm Racing	(United Kingdom) Bobby Verdon-Roe (United Kingdom) Paul Knapfield	Jaguar 7.0L V12	D	63
23 DNF	GT	7	(Germany) RWS Motorsport	(Austria) Dieter Quester (Italy) Luca Riccitelli	Porsche 911 GT	P	34
23 DNF	GT	7	(Germany) RWS Motorsport	(Austria) Dieter Quester (Italy) Luca Riccitelli	Porsche 3.9L Flat-6	P	34
24 DNF	N-GT	62	(United Kingdom) Cirtek Motorsport	(Germany) Hans Fertl (Italy) Raffaele Sangiuolo	Porsche 911 GT3-RS	D	28
24 DNF	N-GT	62	(United Kingdom) Cirtek Motorsport	(Germany) Hans Fertl (Italy) Raffaele Sangiuolo	Porsche 3.6L Flat-6	D	28
25 DNF	GT	12	(France) Paul Belmondo Racing	(Italy) Fabio Babini (Belgium) Marc Duez	Chrysler Viper GTS-R	P	14
25 DNF	GT	12	(France) Paul Belmondo Racing	(Italy) Fabio Babini (Belgium) Marc Duez	Chrysler 8.0L V10	P	14
26 DNF	GT	22	(Italy) BMS Scuderia Italia	(Switzerland) Enzo Calderari (Switzerland) Lilian Bryner (Switzerland) Frédéric Dor	Ferrari 550-GTS Maranello	MI	10
26 DNF	GT	22	(Italy) BMS Scuderia Italia	(Switzerland) Enzo Calderari (Switzerland) Lilian Bryner (Switzerland) Frédéric Dor	Ferrari 5.9L V12	MI	10
DSQ^{†}	N-GT	54	(Germany) Freisinger Motorsport	(Portugal) Ni Amorim (Monaco) Stéphane Ortelli	Porsche 911 GT3-RS	D	103
DSQ^{†}	N-GT	54	(Germany) Freisinger Motorsport	(Portugal) Ni Amorim (Monaco) Stéphane Ortelli	Porsche 3.6L Flat-6	D	103
DNS	GT	5	(France) Force One Racing	(France) David Hallyday (France) Philippe Alliot	Ferrari 550 Maranello	MI	–
DNS	GT	5	(France) Force One Racing	(France) David Hallyday (France) Philippe Alliot	Ferrari 6.0L V12	MI	–

† – #54 Freisinger Motorsport was disqualified after failing post-race technical inspection. The car was found to have a fuel tank larger than the rules allowed.

== Statistics ==
- Pole position – #14 Lister Storm Racing – 1:33.974
- Fastest lap – #14 Lister Storm Racing – 1:35.313
- Average speed – 152.694 km/h

FIA GT Championship
Previous race: None	2002 season	Next race: 2002 FIA GT Silverstone 500km
