= 2002 FIA GT Oschersleben 500km =

Layout of the Motorsport Arena Oschersleben

The 2002 FIA GT Oschersleben 500 km was the sixth round the 2002 FIA GT Championship season. It took place at the Motorsport Arena Oschersleben, Germany, on 14 July 2002.

== Official results ==
Class winners in bold. Cars failing to complete 70% of winner's distance marked as Not Classified (NC).

Pos	Class	No	Team	Drivers	Chassis	Tyre	Laps
Pos	Class	No	Team	Drivers	Engine	Tyre	Laps
1	**GT**	**23**	**(Italy) BMS Scuderia Italia**	**(Italy) Andrea Piccini (Switzerland) Jean-Denis Délétraz**	**Ferrari 550-GTS Maranello**	MI	**120**
1	**GT**	**23**	**(Italy) BMS Scuderia Italia**	**(Italy) Andrea Piccini (Switzerland) Jean-Denis Délétraz**	**Ferrari 5.9L V12**	MI	**120**
2	GT	14	(United Kingdom) Lister Storm Racing	(United Kingdom) Jamie Campbell-Walter (Germany) Nicolaus Springer	Lister Storm	D	120
2	GT	14	(United Kingdom) Lister Storm Racing	(United Kingdom) Jamie Campbell-Walter (Germany) Nicolaus Springer	Jaguar 7.0L V12	D	120
3	GT	12	(France) Paul Belmondo Racing	(Italy) Fabio Babini (Belgium) Marc Duez	Chrysler Viper GTS-R	P	120
3	GT	12	(France) Paul Belmondo Racing	(Italy) Fabio Babini (Belgium) Marc Duez	Chrysler 8.0L V10	P	120
4	GT	2	(France) Larbre Compétition Chereau	(Belgium) Vincent Vosse (Sweden) Carl Rosenblad	Chrysler Viper GTS-R	MI	120
4	GT	2	(France) Larbre Compétition Chereau	(Belgium) Vincent Vosse (Sweden) Carl Rosenblad	Chrysler 8.0L V10	MI	120
5	GT	4	(Netherlands) Team Carsport Holland (Italy) Racing Box	(Italy) Fabrizio Gollin (Italy) Luca Cappellari	Chrysler Viper GTS-R	P	119
5	GT	4	(Netherlands) Team Carsport Holland (Italy) Racing Box	(Italy) Fabrizio Gollin (Italy) Luca Cappellari	Chrysler 8.0L V10	P	119
6	GT	15	(United Kingdom) Lister Storm Racing	(United Kingdom) Bobby Verdon-Roe (United Kingdom) Paul Knapfield	Lister Storm	D	119
6	GT	15	(United Kingdom) Lister Storm Racing	(United Kingdom) Bobby Verdon-Roe (United Kingdom) Paul Knapfield	Jaguar 7.0L V12	D	119
7	GT	11	(France) Paul Belmondo Racing	(France) Paul Belmondo (France) Claude-Yves Gosselin	Chrysler Viper GTS-R	P	118
7	GT	11	(France) Paul Belmondo Racing	(France) Paul Belmondo (France) Claude-Yves Gosselin	Chrysler 8.0L V10	P	118
8	**N-GT**	**58**	**(Italy) Autorlando Sport**	**(Austria) Philipp Peter (Austria) Toto Wolff**	**Porsche 911 GT3-RS**	P	**115**
8	**N-GT**	**58**	**(Italy) Autorlando Sport**	**(Austria) Philipp Peter (Austria) Toto Wolff**	**Porsche 3.6L Flat-6**	P	**115**
9	N-GT	76	(Germany) RWS Motorsport	(Austria) Horst Felbermayr, Jr. (Spain) Antonio García	Porsche 911 GT3-R	P	115
9	N-GT	76	(Germany) RWS Motorsport	(Austria) Horst Felbermayr, Jr. (Spain) Antonio García	Porsche 3.6L Flat-6	P	115
10	N-GT	51	(France) JMB Racing	(Italy) Andrea Bertolini (Italy) Andrea Garbagnati	Ferrari 360 Modena N-GT	P	114
10	N-GT	51	(France) JMB Racing	(Italy) Andrea Bertolini (Italy) Andrea Garbagnati	Ferrari 3.6L V8	P	114
11	N-GT	55	(Germany) Freisinger Motorsport	(France) Stéphane Daoudi (Belgium) Bert Longin	Porsche 911 GT3-RS	D	113
11	N-GT	55	(Germany) Freisinger Motorsport	(France) Stéphane Daoudi (Belgium) Bert Longin	Porsche 3.6L Flat-6	D	113
12	N-GT	62	(United Kingdom) Cirtek Motorsport	(Italy) Thomas Pichler (Italy) Raffale Sangiuolo	Porsche 911 GT3-RS	D	113
12	N-GT	62	(United Kingdom) Cirtek Motorsport	(Italy) Thomas Pichler (Italy) Raffale Sangiuolo	Porsche 3.6L Flat-6	D	113
13	N-GT	60	(Germany) JVG Racing	(Germany) Jürgen von Gartzen (United Kingdom) Ian Khan	Porsche 911 GT3-RS	P	113
13	N-GT	60	(Germany) JVG Racing	(Germany) Jürgen von Gartzen (United Kingdom) Ian Khan	Porsche 3.6L Flat-6	P	113
14	GT	16	(Germany) Proton Competition	(Germany) Gerold Ried (Germany) Christian Ried	Porsche 911 GT2	Y	112
14	GT	16	(Germany) Proton Competition	(Germany) Gerold Ried (Germany) Christian Ried	Porsche 3.6L Turbo Flat-6	Y	112
15	N-GT	50	(France) JMB Racing	(Italy) Christian Pescatori (Italy) Andrea Montermini	Ferrari 360 Modena N-GT	P	112
15	N-GT	50	(France) JMB Racing	(Italy) Christian Pescatori (Italy) Andrea Montermini	Ferrari 3.6L V8	P	112
16	N-GT	53	(France) JMB Competition	(Netherlands) Peter Kutemann (Italy) Batti Pregliasco (Switzerland) Iradj Alexander	Ferrari 360 Modena N-GT	P	112
16	N-GT	53	(France) JMB Competition	(Netherlands) Peter Kutemann (Italy) Batti Pregliasco (Switzerland) Iradj Alexander	Ferrari 3.6L V8	P	112
17	N-GT	77	(Germany) RWS Motorsport	(Russia) Alexey Vasilyev (Russia) Nikolai Fomenko	Porsche 911 GT3-R	P	108
17	N-GT	77	(Germany) RWS Motorsport	(Russia) Alexey Vasilyev (Russia) Nikolai Fomenko	Porsche 3.6L Flat-6	P	108
18	N-GT	66	(Italy) MAC Racing (Italy) Scuderia Veregra	(Italy) Fabio Venier (Italy) Moreno Soli	Porsche 911 GT3-R	D	105
18	N-GT	66	(Italy) MAC Racing (Italy) Scuderia Veregra	(Italy) Fabio Venier (Italy) Moreno Soli	Porsche 3.6L Flat-6	D	105
19	GT	3	(Netherlands) Team Carsport Holland (Italy) Racing Box	(Netherlands) Mike Hezemans (Belgium) Anthony Kumpen	Chrysler Viper GTS-R	P	99
19	GT	3	(Netherlands) Team Carsport Holland (Italy) Racing Box	(Netherlands) Mike Hezemans (Belgium) Anthony Kumpen	Chrysler 8.0L V10	P	99
20	N-GT	70	(Italy) MAC Racing (Italy) Scuderia Veregra	(Italy) Francesco Merendino (Italy) Michele Merendino	Porsche 911 GT3-RS	D	88
20	N-GT	70	(Italy) MAC Racing (Italy) Scuderia Veregra	(Italy) Francesco Merendino (Italy) Michele Merendino	Porsche 3.6L Flat-6	D	88
21 NC	GT	17	(Germany) Proton Competition	(Austria) Horst Felbermayr, Sr. (Italy) Mauro Casadei (Italy) Giovanni Caligaris	Porsche 911 GT2	Y	83
21 NC	GT	17	(Germany) Proton Competition	(Austria) Horst Felbermayr, Sr. (Italy) Mauro Casadei (Italy) Giovanni Caligaris	Porsche 3.6L Turbo Flat-6	Y	83
22 DNF	GT	5	(France) Force One Racing	(France) David Hallyday (France) Philippe Alliot	Ferrari 550 Maranello	MI	62
22 DNF	GT	5	(France) Force One Racing	(France) David Hallyday (France) Philippe Alliot	Ferrari 6.0L V12	MI	62
23 DNF	GT	1	(France) Larbre Compétition Chereau	(France) Christophe Bouchut (France) David Terrien	Chrysler Viper GTS-R	MI	52
23 DNF	GT	1	(France) Larbre Compétition Chereau	(France) Christophe Bouchut (France) David Terrien	Chrysler 8.0L V10	MI	52
24 DNF	N-GT	52	(France) JMB Competition	(Italy) Pietro Gianni (France) Jean-Philippe Belloc	Ferrari 360 Modena N-GT	P	44
24 DNF	N-GT	52	(France) JMB Competition	(Italy) Pietro Gianni (France) Jean-Philippe Belloc	Ferrari 3.6L V8	P	44
25 DNF	N-GT	54	(Germany) Freisinger Motorsport	(Germany) Sascha Maassen (Monaco) Stéphane Ortelli	Porsche 911 GT3-RS	D	25
25 DNF	N-GT	54	(Germany) Freisinger Motorsport	(Germany) Sascha Maassen (Monaco) Stéphane Ortelli	Porsche 3.6L Flat-6	D	25

== Statistics ==
- Pole position – #14 Lister Storm Racing – 1:24.992
- Fastest lap – #14 Lister Storm Racing – 1:25.746
- Average speed – 146.410 km/h

FIA GT Championship
Previous race: 2002 FIA GT Anderstorp 500km	2002 season	Next race: 2002 Spa 24 Hours
