= 2002 FIA GT Anderstorp 500km =

Layout of the Anderstorp Raceway

The 2002 FIA GT Anderstorp 500 km was the fifth round the 2002 FIA GT Championship season. It took place at the Scandinavian Raceway, Sweden, on 30 June 2002.

== Official results ==
Class winners in bold. Cars failing to complete 70% of winner's distance marked as Not Classified (NC).

Pos	Class	No	Team	Drivers	Chassis	Tyre	Laps
Pos	Class	No	Team	Drivers	Engine	Tyre	Laps
1	**GT**	**23**	**(Italy) BMS Scuderia Italia**	**(Italy) Andrea Piccini (Switzerland) Jean-Denis Délétraz**	**Ferrari 550-GTS Maranello**	M	**84**
1	**GT**	**23**	**(Italy) BMS Scuderia Italia**	**(Italy) Andrea Piccini (Switzerland) Jean-Denis Délétraz**	**Ferrari 5.9L V12**	M	**84**
2	GT	1	(France) Larbre Compétition Chereau	(France) Christophe Bouchut (France) David Terrien	Chrysler Viper GTS-R	M	84
2	GT	1	(France) Larbre Compétition Chereau	(France) Christophe Bouchut (France) David Terrien	Chrysler 8.0L V10	M	84
3	GT	3	(Netherlands) Team Carsport Holland (Italy) Racing Box	(Netherlands) Mike Hezemans (Belgium) Anthony Kumpen	Chrysler Viper GTS-R	P	84
3	GT	3	(Netherlands) Team Carsport Holland (Italy) Racing Box	(Netherlands) Mike Hezemans (Belgium) Anthony Kumpen	Chrysler 8.0L V10	P	84
4	GT	4	(Netherlands) Team Carsport Holland (Italy) Racing Box	(Italy) Fabrizio Gollin (Italy) Luca Cappellari	Chrysler Viper GTS-R	P	84
4	GT	4	(Netherlands) Team Carsport Holland (Italy) Racing Box	(Italy) Fabrizio Gollin (Italy) Luca Cappellari	Chrysler 8.0L V10	P	84
5	GT	22	(Italy) BMS Scuderia Italia	(Switzerland) Enzo Calderari (Switzerland) Lilian Bryner	Ferrari 550-GTS Maranello	M	83
5	GT	22	(Italy) BMS Scuderia Italia	(Switzerland) Enzo Calderari (Switzerland) Lilian Bryner	Ferrari 5.9L V12	M	83
6	GT	2	(France) Larbre Compétition Chereau	(Belgium) Vincent Vosse (Sweden) Carl Rosenblad	Chrysler Viper GTS-R	M	83
6	GT	2	(France) Larbre Compétition Chereau	(Belgium) Vincent Vosse (Sweden) Carl Rosenblad	Chrysler 8.0L V10	M	83
7	GT	11	(France) Paul Belmondo Racing	(France) Paul Belmondo (France) Claude-Yves Gosselin	Chrysler Viper GTS-R	P	83
7	GT	11	(France) Paul Belmondo Racing	(France) Paul Belmondo (France) Claude-Yves Gosselin	Chrysler 8.0L V10	P	83
8	**N-GT**	**54**	**(Germany) Freisinger Motorsport**	**(France) Emmanuel Collard (Monaco) Stéphane Ortelli**	**Porsche 911 GT3-RS**	D	**83**
8	**N-GT**	**54**	**(Germany) Freisinger Motorsport**	**(France) Emmanuel Collard (Monaco) Stéphane Ortelli**	**Porsche 3.6L Flat-6**	D	**83**
9	GT	9	(France) Team A.R.T.	(France) Jean-Pierre Jarier (France) François Lafon	Chrysler Viper GTS-R	P	82
9	GT	9	(France) Team A.R.T.	(France) Jean-Pierre Jarier (France) François Lafon	Chrysler 8.0L V10	P	82
10	N-GT	51	(France) JMB Racing	(Italy) Andrea Bertolini (Italy) Andrea Garbagnati	Ferrari 360 Modena N-GT	P	82
10	N-GT	51	(France) JMB Racing	(Italy) Andrea Bertolini (Italy) Andrea Garbagnati	Ferrari 3.6L V8	P	82
11	GT	25	(Belgium) PSI Motorsport	(Belgium) Kurt Mollekens (Finland) Markus Palttala	Porsche 911 Bi-Turbo	D	82
11	GT	25	(Belgium) PSI Motorsport	(Belgium) Kurt Mollekens (Finland) Markus Palttala	Porsche 3.6L Turbo Flat-6	D	82
12	N-GT	58	(Italy) Autorlando Sport	(Austria) Walter Lechner Jr. (Austria) Toto Wolff	Porsche 911 GT3-RS	P	82
12	N-GT	58	(Italy) Autorlando Sport	(Austria) Walter Lechner Jr. (Austria) Toto Wolff	Porsche 3.6L Flat-6	P	82
13	N-GT	50	(France) JMB Racing	(Italy) Christian Pescatori (Italy) Andrea Montermini	Ferrari 360 Modena N-GT	P	82
13	N-GT	50	(France) JMB Racing	(Italy) Christian Pescatori (Italy) Andrea Montermini	Ferrari 3.6L V8	P	82
14	N-GT	62	(United Kingdom) Cirtek Motorsport	(Denmark) John Nielsen (United Kingdom) Robin Liddell	Porsche 911 GT3-RS	D	82
14	N-GT	62	(United Kingdom) Cirtek Motorsport	(Denmark) John Nielsen (United Kingdom) Robin Liddell	Porsche 3.6L Flat-6	D	82
15	N-GT	64	(United Kingdom) Cirtek Motorsport	(Italy) Thomas Pichler (Italy) Raffaele Sangiuolo	Porsche 911 GT3-R	D	81
15	N-GT	64	(United Kingdom) Cirtek Motorsport	(Italy) Thomas Pichler (Italy) Raffaele Sangiuolo	Porsche 3.6L Flat-6	D	81
16	N-GT	72	(Sweden) Podium Racing	(Sweden) Johan Sturesson (Sweden) Hubert Bergh	Porsche 911 GT3-RS	D	81
16	N-GT	72	(Sweden) Podium Racing	(Sweden) Johan Sturesson (Sweden) Hubert Bergh	Porsche 3.6L Flat-6	D	81
17	N-GT	73	(Sweden) Podium Racing	(Sweden) Marcus Gustavsson (Sweden) Tomas Nyström	Porsche 911 GT3-RS	D	81
17	N-GT	73	(Sweden) Podium Racing	(Sweden) Marcus Gustavsson (Sweden) Tomas Nyström	Porsche 3.6L Flat-6	D	81
18	N-GT	77	(Germany) RWS Motorsport	(Russia) Alexey Vasilyev (Russia) Nikolai Fomenko	Porsche 911 GT3-R	P	80
18	N-GT	77	(Germany) RWS Motorsport	(Russia) Alexey Vasilyev (Russia) Nikolai Fomenko	Porsche 3.6L Flat-6	P	80
19	N-GT	55	(Germany) Freisinger Motorsport	(France) Stéphane Daoudi (Belgium) Bert Longin	Porsche 911 GT3-RS	D	80
19	N-GT	55	(Germany) Freisinger Motorsport	(France) Stéphane Daoudi (Belgium) Bert Longin	Porsche 3.6L Flat-6	D	80
20	GT	28	(Sweden) JPS Porsche Racing Team	(Sweden) Bo Jonasson (Sweden) Claés Lund (Sweden) Anders Levin	Porsche 911 Bi-Turbo	D	79
20	GT	28	(Sweden) JPS Porsche Racing Team	(Sweden) Bo Jonasson (Sweden) Claés Lund (Sweden) Anders Levin	Porsche 3.6L Turbo Flat-6	D	79
21	N-GT	75	(Sweden) Team Eurotech Scandinavian	(Sweden) Pontus Mörth (Norway) Thomas Faraas	Porsche 911 GT3-RS	D	78
21	N-GT	75	(Sweden) Team Eurotech Scandinavian	(Sweden) Pontus Mörth (Norway) Thomas Faraas	Porsche 3.6L Flat-6	D	78
22	N-GT	53	(France) JMB Competition	(Netherlands) Peter Kutemann (Switzerland) Iradj Alexander	Ferrari 360 Modena N-GT	P	75
22	N-GT	53	(France) JMB Competition	(Netherlands) Peter Kutemann (Switzerland) Iradj Alexander	Ferrari 3.6L V8	P	75
23	GT	16	(Germany) Proton Competition	(Germany) Gerold Ried (Germany) Christian Ried	Porsche 911 GT2	Y	75
23	GT	16	(Germany) Proton Competition	(Germany) Gerold Ried (Germany) Christian Ried	Porsche 3.6L Turbo Flat-6	Y	75
24	N-GT	52	(France) JMB Competition	(Italy) Pietro Gianni (Sweden) Tony Ring	Ferrari 360 Modena N-GT	P	73
24	N-GT	52	(France) JMB Competition	(Italy) Pietro Gianni (Sweden) Tony Ring	Ferrari 3.6L V8	P	73
25	N-GT	76	(Germany) RWS Motorsport	(Italy) Michele Merendino (Spain) Antonio García	Porsche 911 GT3-R	P	64
25	N-GT	76	(Germany) RWS Motorsport	(Italy) Michele Merendino (Spain) Antonio García	Porsche 3.6L Flat-6	P	64
26 DNF	GT	15	(United Kingdom) Lister Storm Racing	(United Kingdom) Bobby Verdon-Roe (United Kingdom) Paul Knapfield	Lister Storm	D	42
26 DNF	GT	15	(United Kingdom) Lister Storm Racing	(United Kingdom) Bobby Verdon-Roe (United Kingdom) Paul Knapfield	Jaguar 7.0L V12	D	42
27 DNF	GT	29	(Sweden) Henrik Roos Team	(Sweden) Henrik Roos (Sweden) Magnus Wallinder	Chrysler Viper GTS-R	D	42
27 DNF	GT	29	(Sweden) Henrik Roos Team	(Sweden) Henrik Roos (Sweden) Magnus Wallinder	Chrysler 8.0L V10	D	42
28 DNF	GT	14	(United Kingdom) Lister Storm Racing	(United Kingdom) Jamie Campbell-Walter (Germany) Nicolaus Springer	Lister Storm	D	25
28 DNF	GT	14	(United Kingdom) Lister Storm Racing	(United Kingdom) Jamie Campbell-Walter (Germany) Nicolaus Springer	Jaguar 7.0L V12	D	25
29 DNF	N-GT	60	(Germany) JVG Racing	(Germany) Jürgen von Gartzen (United Kingdom) Ian Khan	Porsche 911 GT3-RS	P	25
29 DNF	N-GT	60	(Germany) JVG Racing	(Germany) Jürgen von Gartzen (United Kingdom) Ian Khan	Porsche 3.6L Flat-6	P	25
30 DNF	GT	12	(France) Paul Belmondo Racing	(Italy) Fabio Babini (Belgium) Marc Duez	Chrysler Viper GTS-R	P	24
30 DNF	GT	12	(France) Paul Belmondo Racing	(Italy) Fabio Babini (Belgium) Marc Duez	Chrysler 8.0L V10	P	24

== Statistics ==
- Pole position – #14 Lister Storm Racing – 1:30.601
- Fastest lap – #23 BMS Scuderia Italia – 1:41.603
- Average speed – 111.900 km/h

FIA GT Championship
Previous race: 2002 FIA GT Jarama 500km	2002 season	Next race: 2002 FIA GT Oschersleben 500km
