= 2002 FIA GT Silverstone 500km =

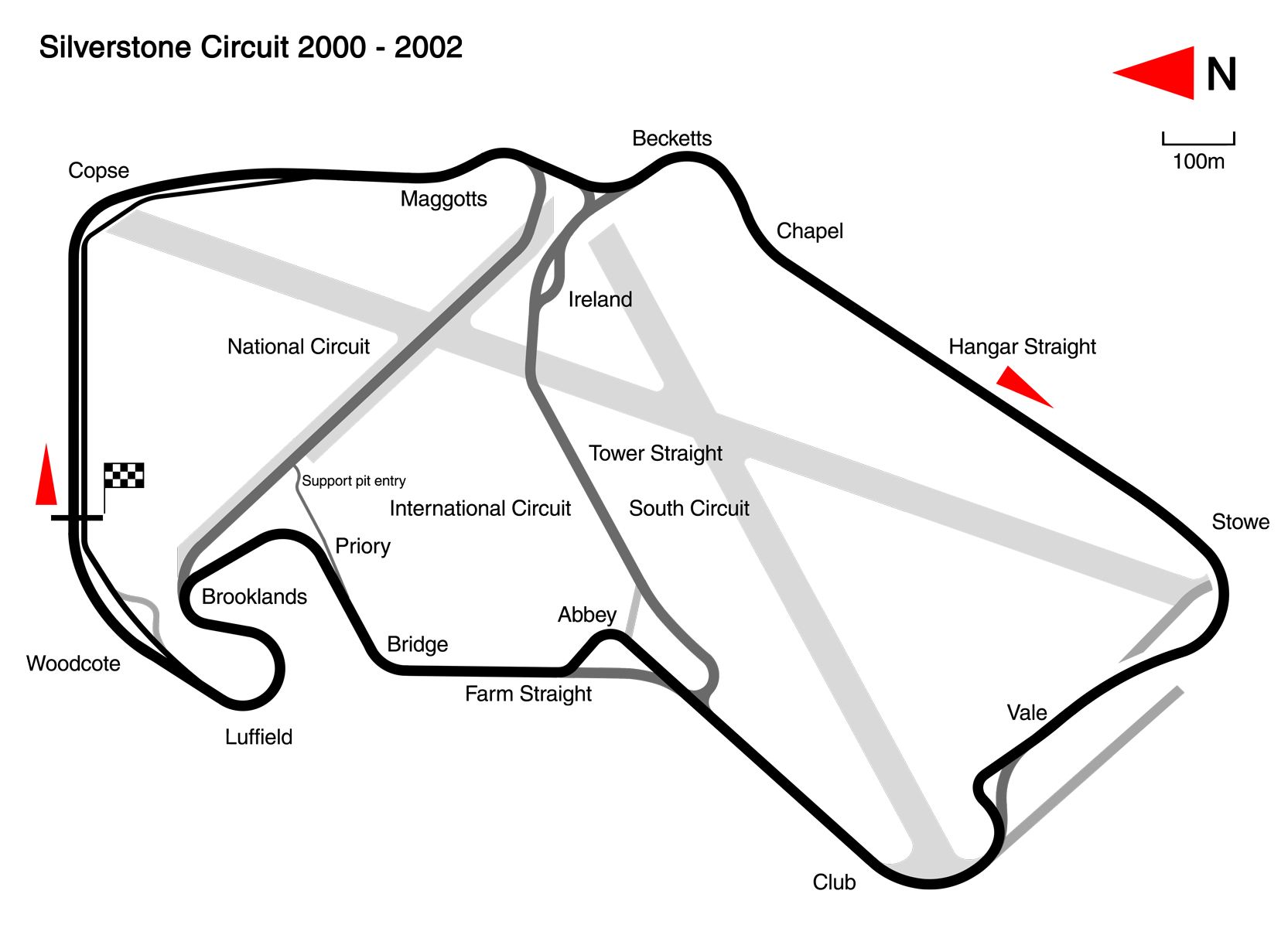
Map of the Silverstone Circuit (2000–2002)

The 2002 FIA GT Silverstone 500 km was the second round the 2002 FIA GT Championship season. It took place at the Silverstone Circuit, United Kingdom, on 5 May 2002.

== Official results ==
Class winners in bold. Cars failing to complete 70% of winner's distance marked as Not Classified (NC).

Pos	Class	No	Team	Drivers	Chassis	Tyre	Laps
Pos	Class	No	Team	Drivers	Engine	Tyre	Laps
1	**GT**	**12**	**(France) Paul Belmondo Racing**	**(Italy) Fabio Babini (Belgium) Marc Duez**	**Chrysler Viper GTS-R**	**P**	**96**
1	**GT**	**12**	**(France) Paul Belmondo Racing**	**(Italy) Fabio Babini (Belgium) Marc Duez**	**Chrysler 8.0L V10**	**P**	**96**
2	GT	15	(United Kingdom) Lister Storm Racing	(United Kingdom) Bobby Verdon-Roe (United Kingdom) Paul Knapfield	Lister Storm	**D**	96
2	GT	15	(United Kingdom) Lister Storm Racing	(United Kingdom) Bobby Verdon-Roe (United Kingdom) Paul Knapfield	Jaguar 7.0L V12	**D**	96
3	GT	1	(France) Larbre Compétition Chereau	(France) Christophe Bouchut (France) David Terrien (Belgium) Vincent Vosse	Chrysler Viper GTS-R	**MI**	96
3	GT	1	(France) Larbre Compétition Chereau	(France) Christophe Bouchut (France) David Terrien (Belgium) Vincent Vosse	Chrysler 8.0L V10	**MI**	96
4	GT	14	(United Kingdom) Lister Storm Racing	(United Kingdom) Jamie Campbell-Walter (Germany) Nicolaus Springer	Lister Storm	**D**	96
4	GT	14	(United Kingdom) Lister Storm Racing	(United Kingdom) Jamie Campbell-Walter (Germany) Nicolaus Springer	Jaguar 7.0L V12	**D**	96
5	GT	4	(Netherlands) Team Carsport Holland (Italy) Racing Box	(Italy) Fabrizio Gollin (Italy) Luca Cappellari	Chrysler Viper GTS-R	**P**	95
5	GT	4	(Netherlands) Team Carsport Holland (Italy) Racing Box	(Italy) Fabrizio Gollin (Italy) Luca Cappellari	Chrysler 8.0L V10	**P**	95
6	GT	11	(France) Paul Belmondo Racing	(France) Paul Belmondo (France) Claude-Yves Gosselin	Chrysler Viper GTS-R	**P**	95
6	GT	11	(France) Paul Belmondo Racing	(France) Paul Belmondo (France) Claude-Yves Gosselin	Chrysler 8.0L V10	**P**	95
7	GT	7	(Germany) RWS Motorsport	(Austria) Dieter Quester (Italy) Luca Riccitelli	Porsche 911 GT	**P**	94
7	GT	7	(Germany) RWS Motorsport	(Austria) Dieter Quester (Italy) Luca Riccitelli	Porsche 3.9L Flat-6	**P**	94
8	GT	9	(France) Team A.R.T.	(France) Jean-Pierre Jarier (France) François Lafon	Chrysler Viper GTS-R	**P**	93
8	GT	9	(France) Team A.R.T.	(France) Jean-Pierre Jarier (France) François Lafon	Chrysler 8.0L V10	**P**	93
9	**N-GT**	**50**	**(France) JMB Racing**	**(Italy) Christian Pescatori (Italy) Andrea Montermini**	**Ferrari 360 Modena N-GT**	**P**	**92**
9	**N-GT**	**50**	**(France) JMB Racing**	**(Italy) Christian Pescatori (Italy) Andrea Montermini**	**Ferrari 3.6L V8**	**P**	**92**
10	GT	26	(United Kingdom) Cirtek Motorsport	(United Kingdom) Peter Cook (New Zealand) Neil Cunningham (Sweden) Carl Rosenblad	Chrysler Viper GTS-R	**D**	92
10	GT	26	(United Kingdom) Cirtek Motorsport	(United Kingdom) Peter Cook (New Zealand) Neil Cunningham (Sweden) Carl Rosenblad	Chrysler 8.0L V10	**D**	92
11	GT	22	(Italy) BMS Scuderia Italia	(Switzerland) Enzo Calderari (Switzerland) Lilian Bryner (Switzerland) Frédéric Dor	Ferrari 550-GTS Maranello	**MI**	92
11	GT	22	(Italy) BMS Scuderia Italia	(Switzerland) Enzo Calderari (Switzerland) Lilian Bryner (Switzerland) Frédéric Dor	Ferrari 5.9L V12	**MI**	92
12	GT	5	(France) Force One Racing	(France) David Hallyday (France) Philippe Alliot	Ferrari 550 Maranello	**MI**	91
12	GT	5	(France) Force One Racing	(France) David Hallyday (France) Philippe Alliot	Ferrari 6.0L V12	**MI**	91
13	N-GT	58	(Italy) Autorlando Sport	(United Kingdom) Johnny Mowlem (Austria) Toto Wolff	Porsche 911 GT3-RS	**P**	91
13	N-GT	58	(Italy) Autorlando Sport	(United Kingdom) Johnny Mowlem (Austria) Toto Wolff	Porsche 3.6L Flat-6	**P**	91
14	N-GT	51	(France) JMB Racing	(Italy) Andrea Bertolini (Italy) Andrea Garbagnati	Ferrari 360 Modena N-GT	**P**	91
14	N-GT	51	(France) JMB Racing	(Italy) Andrea Bertolini (Italy) Andrea Garbagnati	Ferrari 3.6L V8	**P**	91
15	N-GT	60	(Germany) JVG Racing	(Germany) Jürgen von Gartzen (United Kingdom) Ian Khan	Porsche 911 GT3-RS	**P**	91
15	N-GT	60	(Germany) JVG Racing	(Germany) Jürgen von Gartzen (United Kingdom) Ian Khan	Porsche 3.6L Flat-6	**P**	91
16	N-GT	55	(Germany) Freisinger Motorsport	(France) Stéphane Daoudi (Belgium) Bert Longin	Porsche 911 GT3-RS	**D**	90
16	N-GT	55	(Germany) Freisinger Motorsport	(France) Stéphane Daoudi (Belgium) Bert Longin	Porsche 3.6L Flat-6	**D**	90
17	N-GT	53	(France) JMB Competition	(Italy) Marco Lambertini (Italy) Batti Pregliasco (Switzerland) Iradj Alexander	Ferrari 360 Modena N-GT	**P**	89
17	N-GT	53	(France) JMB Competition	(Italy) Marco Lambertini (Italy) Batti Pregliasco (Switzerland) Iradj Alexander	Ferrari 3.6L V8	**P**	89
18	N-GT	54	(Germany) Freisinger Motorsport	(Portugal) Ni Amorim (Monaco) Stéphane Ortelli	Porsche 911 GT3-RS	**D**	88
18	N-GT	54	(Germany) Freisinger Motorsport	(Portugal) Ni Amorim (Monaco) Stéphane Ortelli	Porsche 3.6L Flat-6	**D**	88
19	N-GT	77	(Germany) RWS Motorsport	(Russia) Alexey Vasilyev (Russia) Nikolai Fomenko	Porsche 911 GT3-R	**P**	86
19	N-GT	77	(Germany) RWS Motorsport	(Russia) Alexey Vasilyev (Russia) Nikolai Fomenko	Porsche 3.6L Flat-6	**P**	86
20	GT	25	(Belgium) PSI Motorsport	(Belgium) Kurt Mollekens (Finland) Markus Palttala	Porsche 911 Bi-Turbo	**D**	71
20	GT	25	(Belgium) PSI Motorsport	(Belgium) Kurt Mollekens (Finland) Markus Palttala	Porsche 3.6L Turbo Flat-6	**D**	71
21 DNF	N-GT	66	(Italy) MAC Racing (Italy) Scuderia Veregra	(Italy) Francesco Merendino (Italy) Michele Merendino	Porsche 911 GT3-R	**D**	59
21 DNF	N-GT	66	(Italy) MAC Racing (Italy) Scuderia Veregra	(Italy) Francesco Merendino (Italy) Michele Merendino	Porsche 3.6L Flat-6	**D**	59
22 DNF	GT	3	(Netherlands) Team Carsport Holland (Italy) Racing Box	(Netherlands) Mike Hezemans (Belgium) Anthony Kumpen	Chrysler Viper GTS-R	**P**	58
22 DNF	GT	3	(Netherlands) Team Carsport Holland (Italy) Racing Box	(Netherlands) Mike Hezemans (Belgium) Anthony Kumpen	Chrysler 8.0L V10	**P**	58
23 DNF	N-GT	62	(United Kingdom) Cirtek Motorsport	(United Kingdom) Adam Jones (Slovakia) Jirko Malchárek	Porsche 911 GT3-RS	**D**	46
23 DNF	N-GT	62	(United Kingdom) Cirtek Motorsport	(United Kingdom) Adam Jones (Slovakia) Jirko Malchárek	Porsche 3.6L Flat-6	**D**	46
24 DNF	N-GT	65	(United Kingdom) Sebah Automotive	(United Kingdom) Hugh Hayden (United Kingdom) Bart Hayden	Porsche 911 GT3-R	?	46
24 DNF	N-GT	65	(United Kingdom) Sebah Automotive	(United Kingdom) Hugh Hayden (United Kingdom) Bart Hayden	Porsche 3.6L Flat-6	?	46
25 DNF	GT	23	(Italy) BMS Scuderia Italia	(Italy) Andrea Piccini (Switzerland) Jean-Denis Délétraz	Ferrari 550-GTS Maranello	**MI**	39
25 DNF	GT	23	(Italy) BMS Scuderia Italia	(Italy) Andrea Piccini (Switzerland) Jean-Denis Délétraz	Ferrari 5.9L V12	**MI**	39
26 DNF	N-GT	64	(United Kingdom) Cirtek Motorsport	(Italy) Roberto Papini (Italy) Raffaele Sangiuolo	Porsche 911 GT3-R	**D**	28
26 DNF	N-GT	64	(United Kingdom) Cirtek Motorsport	(Italy) Roberto Papini (Italy) Raffaele Sangiuolo	Porsche 3.6L Flat-6	**D**	28
27 DNF	GT	16	(Germany) Proton Competition	(Germany) Gerold Ried (Germany) Klaus Horn	Porsche 911 GT2	**Y**	15
27 DNF	GT	16	(Germany) Proton Competition	(Germany) Gerold Ried (Germany) Klaus Horn	Porsche 3.6L Turbo Flat-6	**Y**	15
DSQ^{†}	N-GT	63	(Netherlands) System Force Motorsport	(Netherlands) Phil Bastiaans (Netherlands) Peter Van Merksteijn	Porsche 911 GT3-RS	**P**	90
DSQ^{†}	N-GT	63	(Netherlands) System Force Motorsport	(Netherlands) Phil Bastiaans (Netherlands) Peter Van Merksteijn	Porsche 3.6L Flat-6	**P**	90
DNS	N-GT	52	(France) JMB Competition	(Italy) Gianluca Giraudi (Italy) Pietro Gianni	Ferrari 360 Modena N-GT	**P**	–
DNS	N-GT	52	(France) JMB Competition	(Italy) Gianluca Giraudi (Italy) Pietro Gianni	Ferrari 3.6L V8	**P**	–

† – #63 System Force Motorsport was disqualified from the race for failing to respond to a black flag.

== Statistics ==
- Pole position – #14 Lister Storm Racing – 1:46.644
- Fastest lap – #14 Lister Storm Racing – 1:47.430
- Average speed – 162.530 km/h

FIA GT Championship
Previous race: 2002 FIA GT Magny-Cours 500km	2002 season	Next race: 2002 FIA GT Brno 500km
