= Marco Saviozzi =

French-Italian businessman (born 1967)

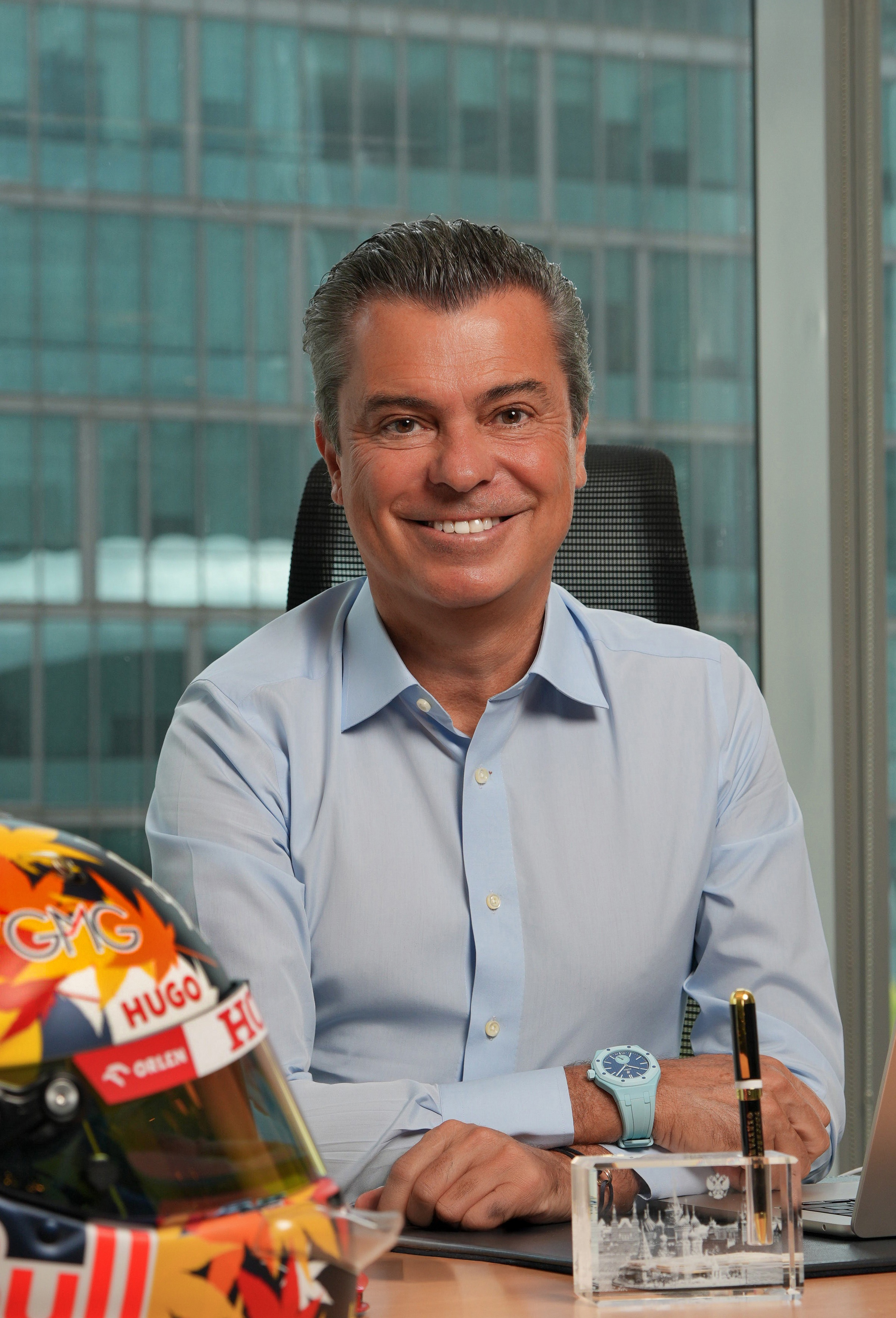
- Born: Marco Saviozzi; 27 September 1967 (age 58); Levallois-Perret, France
- Occupations: Founder, Director & CEO of the GMG Group Limited
- Spouse: Maria
- Children: 4

Marco Saviozzi (born 27 September 1967) is a French-Italian businessman who is the founder of GMG Group, a financial trading firm. He is also director & CEO of GMG (Dubai) Limited, Director of GMG Brokers and Non-Executive Director of GMG Europe B.V.

== Personal life ==
Marco Saviozzi was born in Levallois-Perret, France to a French mother and Italian father. He has four children, two daughters and two sons. He married his wife Maria in 2007 and they reside in Dubai, UAE with their children. When he's not on the trading floor he can be found pursuing one of his favorite hobbies including motorsports, golf or horseracing.

== Career ==
Saviozzi completed his education in Paris and Geneva graduating from Institut European de Management, Paris with a Bachelor's in Business Administration. He then completed a postgraduate degree at Institut European de Management, Geneva, and holds a master's degree in Business Administration.

On completing his education, Saviozzi started his career at Rank Xerox and then Viel et Compagnie SA, both in Paris, before joining Intercapital, London, in 1994.

In 2005, Saviozzi moved to New York where he headed the Equity Derivatives team for ICAP. In 2007, Saviozzi relocated to the UAE and was managing director of Trading with Newedge, Dubai. In 2008, he co-founded GMG Group.

GMG has 200 institutional clients, which include banks, broker-dealers, investment banks, trading firms, corporations, and investment firms. The company has expanded its international presence with offices in London, Dubai, Amsterdam, Prague and Johannesburg.

The company has been named as the official partner for the Formula 1 team, Scuderia AlphaTauri and driver Yuki Tsunoda in previous seasons. In the past 2 years, the company expanded its Formula 1 involvement through sponsorship activities connected with Visa Cash App RB, supporting driver Isack Hadjar. The partnership continues as Hadjar joined Red Bull Racing in 2026.

== Philanthropy ==
Saviozzi has supported various philanthropic initiatives through GMG, with a focus on healthcare, education, and community development. During the COVID-19 pandemic, GMG provided ongoing financial support to King’s College Hospital Dubai, contributing to the hospital’s healthcare initiatives during a period of increased demand on medical services.

Beyond healthcare support, Saviozzi and GMG have also been involved in education-focused initiatives through their support of the Gary and Viviane Player Foundation. This includes contributions towards the Blair Atholl Pre-Primary School in Johannesburg, South Africa, which provides educational opportunities and support for children in the local community.

== Achievements ==
Motor Racing:

- Won 24 Hours of Magny-Cours (Formule France)
- Competed twice in the 24 Hours of Daytona with Porsche (Mac Racing)
- Competed twice in the 24 Hours of Spa, including a 5th place class finish, with Porsche (Mac Racing) and Paul Belmondo Racing (Chrysler Viper)
- Competed in two seasons of the French GT Championship, achieving podium finishes at Magny-Cours and Val de Vienne
- Won Spanish GT Championship with Paul Belmondo Racing (Chrysler Viper)
- Won FIA GT Championship seasons with Cirtek, Freisinger Porsche, and Conrad Racing (Saleen)
- Competed in the Le Mans Series, including participation in the 24 Hours of Le Mans (LMP2 class) with Courage Compétition
- Achieved a podium finish at the 24 Hours Dubai Renault Mégane Prototype

Horse Racing:

- Owner of horse Nadette, a listed race winner and also competed in the Group 1 Prix de Diane

Golf:

- Participated twice in the Alfred Dunhill Championship alongside professional golfers including Miguel Ángel Jiménez and Marc Fraser
- Sponsor of players on the European Tour and Sunshine Tour
- Member of Emirates Golf Club and Les Bordes Golf Club
