= 2002 Spa 24 Hours =

2002 Proximus Spa 24 Hours

Seasons
- ← 2001 2003 →

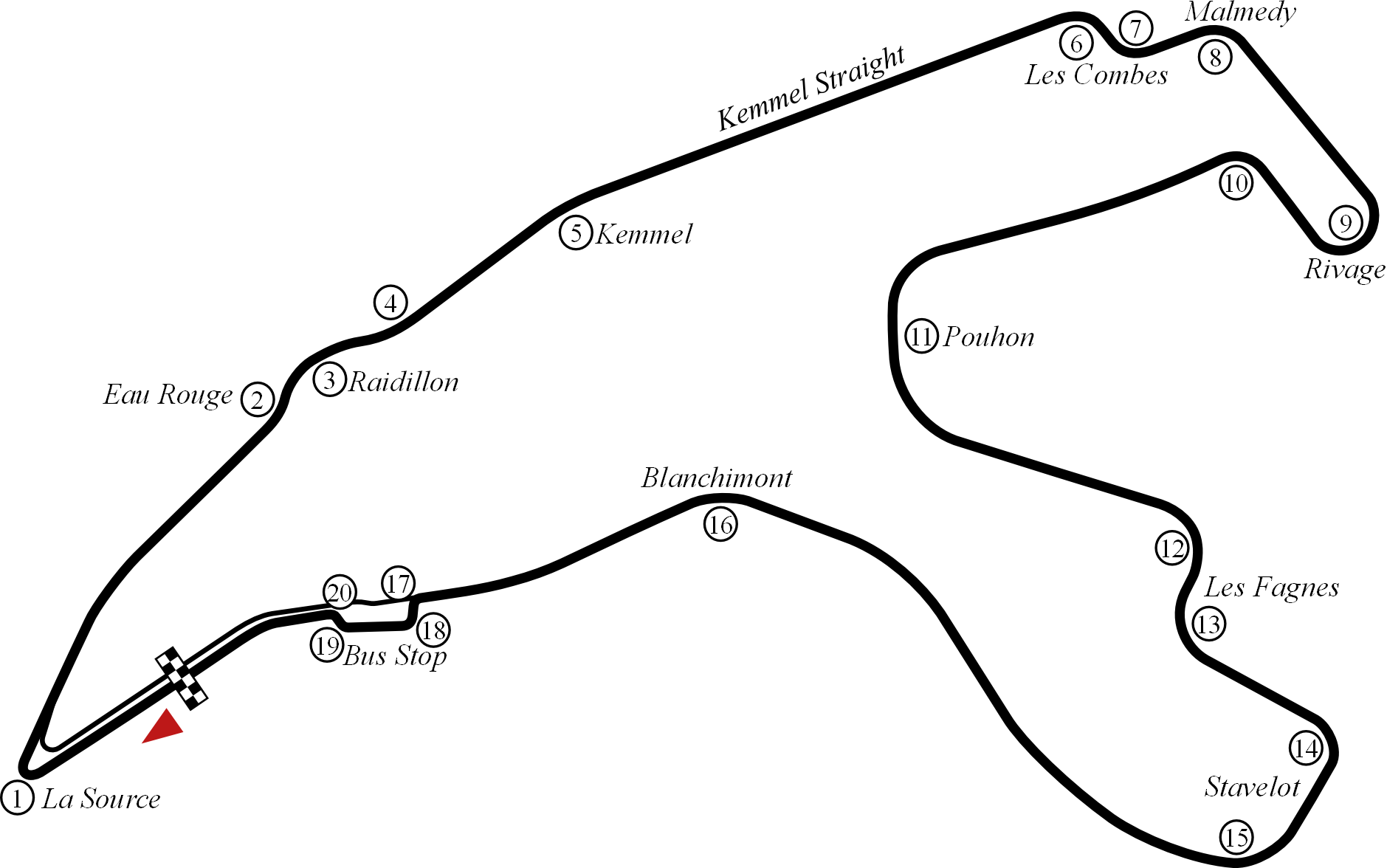
Layout of the Circuit de Spa-Francorchamps (1995-2003)

The 2002 Proximus 24 Spa was the 56th running of the Spa 24 Hours and the seventh round the 2002 FIA GT Championship. This event combined the FIA GT's two classes (GT and N-GT) with cars from smaller national series designated GTN and single-make series designated SMM. An additional class was added for cars confirming to N-GT but with engines under 2000 cc. It took place at the Circuit de Spa-Francorchamps, Belgium, on 3 and 4 August 2002.

== Official results ==
Class winners in bold. Cars failing to complete 70% of winner's distance marked as Not Classified (NC).

Pos	Class	No	Team	Drivers	Chassis	Tyre	Laps
Pos	Class	No	Team	Drivers	Engine	Tyre	Laps
1	**GT**	**1**	**(France) Larbre Compétition Chereau**	**(France) Christophe Bouchut (France) David Terrien (France) Sébastien Bourdais (Belgium) Vincent Vosse**	**Chrysler Viper GTS-R**	M	**526**
1	**GT**	**1**	**(France) Larbre Compétition Chereau**	**(France) Christophe Bouchut (France) David Terrien (France) Sébastien Bourdais (Belgium) Vincent Vosse**	**Chrysler 8.0L V10**	M	**526**
2	GT	15	(United Kingdom) Lister Storm Racing	(United Kingdom) Bobby Verdon-Roe (United Kingdom) Justin Law (Belgium) David Sterckx (Spain) Miguel Ángel de Castro	Lister Storm	D	521
2	GT	15	(United Kingdom) Lister Storm Racing	(United Kingdom) Bobby Verdon-Roe (United Kingdom) Justin Law (Belgium) David Sterckx (Spain) Miguel Ángel de Castro	Jaguar 7.0L V12	D	521
3	**N-GT**	**54**	**(Germany) Freisinger Motorsport**	**(France) Romain Dumas (Monaco) Stéphane Ortelli (France) Emmanuel Collard**	**Porsche 911 GT3-RS**	D	**519**
3	**N-GT**	**54**	**(Germany) Freisinger Motorsport**	**(France) Romain Dumas (Monaco) Stéphane Ortelli (France) Emmanuel Collard**	**Porsche 3.6L Flat-6**	D	**519**
4	N-GT	50	(France) JMB Racing	(Italy) Christian Pescatori (Italy) Andrea Montermini (Italy) Andrea Bertolini (Italy) Andrea Garbagnati	Ferrari 360 Modena N-GT	P	514
4	N-GT	50	(France) JMB Racing	(Italy) Christian Pescatori (Italy) Andrea Montermini (Italy) Andrea Bertolini (Italy) Andrea Garbagnati	Ferrari 3.6L V8	P	514
5	N-GT	55	(Germany) Freisinger Motorsport	(Germany) Marc Lieb (Germany) André Lotterer (France) Georges Forgeois (Belgium) Bert Longin	Porsche 911 GT3-RS	D	508
5	N-GT	55	(Germany) Freisinger Motorsport	(Germany) Marc Lieb (Germany) André Lotterer (France) Georges Forgeois (Belgium) Bert Longin	Porsche 3.6L Flat-6	D	508
6	GT	2	(France) Larbre Compétition Chereau	(France) Jean-Luc Chéreau (France) Jean-Claude Lagniez (Belgium) Didier Defourny (Sweden) Carl Rosenblad	Chrysler Viper GTS-R	M	497
6	GT	2	(France) Larbre Compétition Chereau	(France) Jean-Luc Chéreau (France) Jean-Claude Lagniez (Belgium) Didier Defourny (Sweden) Carl Rosenblad	Chrysler 8.0L V10	M	497
7	N-GT	64	(United Kingdom) Cirtek Motorsport	(United States) Vic Rice (France) Stéphane Daoudi (France) Julien Piquet (Austria) Manfred Jurasz	Porsche 911 GT3-R	D	495
7	N-GT	64	(United Kingdom) Cirtek Motorsport	(United States) Vic Rice (France) Stéphane Daoudi (France) Julien Piquet (Austria) Manfred Jurasz	Porsche 3.6L Flat-6	D	495
8	GT	12	(France) Paul Belmondo Racing	(Italy) Fabio Babini (Belgium) Marc Duez (France) Boris Derichebourg	Chrysler Viper GTS-R	P	494
8	GT	12	(France) Paul Belmondo Racing	(Italy) Fabio Babini (Belgium) Marc Duez (France) Boris Derichebourg	Chrysler 8.0L V10	P	494
9	N-GT	78	(Germany) Seikel Motorsport	(Italy) Luca Drudi (Italy) Gabrio Rosa (United States) Philip Collin (New Zealand) Andrew Bagnall	Porsche 911 GT3-RS	Y	493
9	N-GT	78	(Germany) Seikel Motorsport	(Italy) Luca Drudi (Italy) Gabrio Rosa (United States) Philip Collin (New Zealand) Andrew Bagnall	Porsche 3.6L Flat-6	Y	493
10	**GTN**	**100**	**(Italy) Scuderia Sant'Ambreous**	**(Italy) Alex Caffi (Italy) Emanuele Moncini (Italy) "Yah-Man" (Switzerland) Andrea Chiesa**	**Ferrari 360 Modena N-GT**	Y	**489**
10	**GTN**	**100**	**(Italy) Scuderia Sant'Ambreous**	**(Italy) Alex Caffi (Italy) Emanuele Moncini (Italy) "Yah-Man" (Switzerland) Andrea Chiesa**	**Ferrari 3.6L V8**	Y	**489**
11	GTN	93	(Belgium) Track Promotion	(Belgium) Yves Lambert (Belgium) Christian Lefort (Italy) Antonio De Castro (Italy) Renato Premoli	Porsche 911 GT3 Cup	D	480
11	GTN	93	(Belgium) Track Promotion	(Belgium) Yves Lambert (Belgium) Christian Lefort (Italy) Antonio De Castro (Italy) Renato Premoli	Porsche 3.6L Flat-6	D	480
12	**SMM**	**116**	**(Belgium) AD Sport**	**(Belgium) Patrick Schruers (Belgium) Albert Vanierschot (Belgium) Peter Van Delm (Belgium) Kris Wauters**	**Porsche 911 GT3 Cup**	P	**478**
12	**SMM**	**116**	**(Belgium) AD Sport**	**(Belgium) Patrick Schruers (Belgium) Albert Vanierschot (Belgium) Peter Van Delm (Belgium) Kris Wauters**	**Porsche 3.6L Flat-6**	P	**478**
13	SMM	130	(Belgium) BMW Dealer Team	(Belgium) Guino Kenis (Belgium) Patrick Beliën (Belgium) Peter Beckers	BMW Z3 GT	P	478
13	SMM	130	(Belgium) BMW Dealer Team	(Belgium) Guino Kenis (Belgium) Patrick Beliën (Belgium) Peter Beckers	BMW 3.2L I6	P	478
14	GT	11	(France) Paul Belmondo Racing	(France) Paul Belmondo (France) Claude-Yves Gosselin (Japan) Ryo Fukuda	Chrysler Viper GTS-R	P	476
14	GT	11	(France) Paul Belmondo Racing	(France) Paul Belmondo (France) Claude-Yves Gosselin (Japan) Ryo Fukuda	Chrysler 8.0L V10	P	476
15	GTN	96	(Belgium) AD Sport	(Belgium) Koen Wauters (Belgium) Bert Lambrecht (Belgium) Patrick Selleslagh	Porsche 911 Bi-Turbo	P	476
15	GTN	96	(Belgium) AD Sport	(Belgium) Koen Wauters (Belgium) Bert Lambrecht (Belgium) Patrick Selleslagh	Porsche 3.6L Turbo Flat-6	P	476
16	N-GT	66	(Italy) MAC Racing (Italy) Scuderia Veregra	(France) Marco Saviozzi (France) Pierre Bes (France) Emmanuel Moinel Delalande (France) Didier Moinel Delalande	Porsche 911 GT3-R	D	474
16	N-GT	66	(Italy) MAC Racing (Italy) Scuderia Veregra	(France) Marco Saviozzi (France) Pierre Bes (France) Emmanuel Moinel Delalande (France) Didier Moinel Delalande	Porsche 3.6L Flat-6	D	474
17	SMM	111	(Switzerland) Alexander Frei	(Switzerland) Alexander Frei (France) David Velay (Belgium) Cédric Lorent	Lamborghini Diablo GTR	P	466
17	SMM	111	(Switzerland) Alexander Frei	(Switzerland) Alexander Frei (France) David Velay (Belgium) Cédric Lorent	Lamborghini 6.0L V12	P	466
18	GTN	95	(Belgium) Ice Pol Racing Team	(Belgium) René Franchi (Belgium) Amaury Heurckmans (Belgium) Mark Delobe (Belgium) Stéphane Lémeret	Porsche 911 GT3-RS	D	466
18	GTN	95	(Belgium) Ice Pol Racing Team	(Belgium) René Franchi (Belgium) Amaury Heurckmans (Belgium) Mark Delobe (Belgium) Stéphane Lémeret	Porsche 3.6L Flat-6	D	466
19	SMM	119	(France) Ruffier Events	(France) James Ruffier (France) Jean-Claude Ruffier (France) Rudolphe Hauchard (France) Frédéric Hauchard	Porsche 911 GT3 Cup	P	466
19	SMM	119	(France) Ruffier Events	(France) James Ruffier (France) Jean-Claude Ruffier (France) Rudolphe Hauchard (France) Frédéric Hauchard	Porsche 3.6L Flat-6	P	466
20	SMM	118	(France) SMG	(France) Philippe Gache (France) Jean-Luc Blanchemain (France) Hervé Clément (France) José Garcia	Porsche 911 GT3 Cup	M	463
20	SMM	118	(France) SMG	(France) Philippe Gache (France) Jean-Luc Blanchemain (France) Hervé Clément (France) José Garcia	Porsche 3.6L Flat-6	M	463
21	SMM	115	(Belgium) PSI Motorsport	(Belgium) Philippe Tollenaire (Belgium) Sylvie Delcour (Belgium) Loïc Deman	Porsche 911 GT3 Supercup	D	463
21	SMM	115	(Belgium) PSI Motorsport	(Belgium) Philippe Tollenaire (Belgium) Sylvie Delcour (Belgium) Loïc Deman	Porsche 3.6L Flat-6	D	463
22	N-GT	81	(Switzerland) Swiss GT Racing	(Belgium) Alain Corbisier (Belgium) Luc Pensis (Belgium) Steve Van Bellingen	Porsche 911 GT3-R	D	421
22	N-GT	81	(Switzerland) Swiss GT Racing	(Belgium) Alain Corbisier (Belgium) Luc Pensis (Belgium) Steve Van Bellingen	Porsche 3.6L Flat-6	D	421
23	N-GT	77	(Germany) RWS Motorsport	(Russia) Alexey Vasilyev (Russia) Nikolai Fomenko (Spain) Antonio García (Spain) Jesús Díez Villarroel	Porsche 911 GT3-R	P	417
23	N-GT	77	(Germany) RWS Motorsport	(Russia) Alexey Vasilyev (Russia) Nikolai Fomenko (Spain) Antonio García (Spain) Jesús Díez Villarroel	Porsche 3.6L Flat-6	P	417
24	SMM	120	(France) Banking Compétition	(France) Philippe Tillie (France) Didier Ortion (Canada) Sylvain Tremblay (Belgium) Didier Miquee	Porsche 911 GT3 Cup	P	409
24	SMM	120	(France) Banking Compétition	(France) Philippe Tillie (France) Didier Ortion (Canada) Sylvain Tremblay (Belgium) Didier Miquee	Porsche 3.6L Flat-6	P	409
25	GTN	122	(United Kingdom) Veryplast Belgium (United Kingdom) Rollcentre Racing	(United Kingdom) Martin Short (United Kingdom) Rob Barff (United Kingdom) Simon Pullan	TVR Cerbera Speed Six	D	401
25	GTN	122	(United Kingdom) Veryplast Belgium (United Kingdom) Rollcentre Racing	(United Kingdom) Martin Short (United Kingdom) Rob Barff (United Kingdom) Simon Pullan	TVR Speed Six 4.0L I6	D	401
26	GTN	92	Racing Team Belgium	(Belgium) Fanny Duchâteau (Belgium) Jean-François Hemroulle (Belgium) Jeffrey van Hooydonk	Gillet Vertigo Streiff	Y	377
26	GTN	92	Racing Team Belgium	(Belgium) Fanny Duchâteau (Belgium) Jean-François Hemroulle (Belgium) Jeffrey van Hooydonk	Alfa Romeo 3.0L V6	Y	377
27 DNF	GT	14	(United Kingdom) Lister Storm Racing	(United Kingdom) Jamie Campbell-Walter (United Kingdom) Andy Wallace (Germany) Nicolaus Springer (Belgium) Eric van de Poele	Lister Storm	D	424
27 DNF	GT	14	(United Kingdom) Lister Storm Racing	(United Kingdom) Jamie Campbell-Walter (United Kingdom) Andy Wallace (Germany) Nicolaus Springer (Belgium) Eric van de Poele	Jaguar 7.0L V12	D	424
28 DNF	N-GT	76	(Germany) RWS Motorsport	(Austria) Philipp Peter (Austria) Dieter Quester (Austria) Toto Wolff (Italy) Luca Riccitelli	Porsche 911 GT3-R	P	351
28 DNF	N-GT	76	(Germany) RWS Motorsport	(Austria) Philipp Peter (Austria) Dieter Quester (Austria) Toto Wolff (Italy) Luca Riccitelli	Porsche 3.6L Flat-6	P	351
29 DNF	GTN	91	Racing Team Belgium	(Belgium) Vanina Ickx (Belgium) David Saelens (Belgium) Renaud Kuppens	Gillet Vertigo Streiff	Y	350
29 DNF	GTN	91	Racing Team Belgium	(Belgium) Vanina Ickx (Belgium) David Saelens (Belgium) Renaud Kuppens	Alfa Romeo 3.0L V6	Y	350
30 DNF	N-GT	63	(Netherlands) System Force Motorsport	(Netherlands) Peter Van Merksteijn (Netherlands) Phil Bastiaans (Belgium) Stéphane Vancampenhoudt	Porsche 911 GT3-RS	P	338
30 DNF	N-GT	63	(Netherlands) System Force Motorsport	(Netherlands) Peter Van Merksteijn (Netherlands) Phil Bastiaans (Belgium) Stéphane Vancampenhoudt	Porsche 3.6L Flat-6	P	338
31 DNF	GT	25	(Belgium) PSI Motorsport	(Belgium) Kurt Mollekens (Belgium) Eric Geboers (Finland) Markus Palttala	Porsche 911 Bi-Turbo	D	312
31 DNF	GT	25	(Belgium) PSI Motorsport	(Belgium) Kurt Mollekens (Belgium) Eric Geboers (Finland) Markus Palttala	Porsche 3.6L Flat-6	D	312
32 DNF	GTN	98	(Belgium) Markant Racing	(Belgium) Franck Tardivet (Belgium) Bert Van Rossem (Belgium) Wim Meulders (France) Nicolas de Gastines	Porsche 911 GT3 Cup	D	271
32 DNF	GTN	98	(Belgium) Markant Racing	(Belgium) Franck Tardivet (Belgium) Bert Van Rossem (Belgium) Wim Meulders (France) Nicolas de Gastines	Porsche 3.6L Flat-6	D	271
33 DNF	N-GT	80	(Switzerland) Swiss GT Racing	(France) Luc Alphand (France) Sylvain Noël (France) Christian Lavieille (France) Stéphane Echallard	Porsche 911 GT3-R	D	269
33 DNF	N-GT	80	(Switzerland) Swiss GT Racing	(France) Luc Alphand (France) Sylvain Noël (France) Christian Lavieille (France) Stéphane Echallard	Porsche 3.6L Flat-6	D	269
34 DNF	GT	3	(Netherlands) Team Carsport Holland (Italy) Racing Box	(Netherlands) Mike Hezemans (Belgium) Anthony Kumpen (Belgium) Thierry Tassin	Chrysler Viper GTS-R	P	204
34 DNF	GT	3	(Netherlands) Team Carsport Holland (Italy) Racing Box	(Netherlands) Mike Hezemans (Belgium) Anthony Kumpen (Belgium) Thierry Tassin	Chrysler 8.0L V10	P	204
35 DNF	N-GT	62	(United Kingdom) Cirtek Motorsport	(Italy) Roberto Papini (Italy) Raffale Sangiuolo (Belgium) Leo Van Sande (Belgium) Tom Zurstrassen	Porsche 911 GT3-RS	D	190
35 DNF	N-GT	62	(United Kingdom) Cirtek Motorsport	(Italy) Roberto Papini (Italy) Raffale Sangiuolo (Belgium) Leo Van Sande (Belgium) Tom Zurstrassen	Porsche 3.6L Flat-6	D	190
36 DNF	N-GT	58	(Italy) Autorlando Sport	(Germany) Ulrich Schumacher (Germany) Udo Schneider (Germany) Stefan Jentzsch (Germany) Andreas von Zitzewitz	Porsche 911 GT3-RS	P	189
36 DNF	N-GT	58	(Italy) Autorlando Sport	(Germany) Ulrich Schumacher (Germany) Udo Schneider (Germany) Stefan Jentzsch (Germany) Andreas von Zitzewitz	Porsche 3.6L Flat-6	P	189
37 DNF	GT	4	(Netherlands) Team Carsport Holland (Italy) Racing Box	(Italy) Fabrizio Gollin (Italy) Luca Cappellari (Belgium) Bas Leinders	Chrysler Viper GTS-R	P	115
37 DNF	GT	4	(Netherlands) Team Carsport Holland (Italy) Racing Box	(Italy) Fabrizio Gollin (Italy) Luca Cappellari (Belgium) Bas Leinders	Chrysler 8.0L V10	P	115
38 DNF	N-GT	51	(France) JMB Racing	(Netherlands) Peter Kutemann (United States) Stephen Earle (Belgium) Geoffroy Horion (Switzerland) Iradj Alexander	Ferrari 360 Modena N-GT	P	100
38 DNF	N-GT	51	(France) JMB Racing	(Netherlands) Peter Kutemann (United States) Stephen Earle (Belgium) Geoffroy Horion (Switzerland) Iradj Alexander	Ferrari 3.6L V8	P	100
39 DNF	GT	23	(Italy) BMS Scuderia Italia	(Italy) Andrea Piccini (Italy) Marco Zadra (Switzerland) Jean-Denis Délétraz (Switzerland) Lilian Bryner	Ferrari 550-GTS Maranello	M	94
39 DNF	GT	23	(Italy) BMS Scuderia Italia	(Italy) Andrea Piccini (Italy) Marco Zadra (Switzerland) Jean-Denis Délétraz (Switzerland) Lilian Bryner	Ferrari 5.9L V12	M	94
40 DNF	GTN	97	(Belgium) PSI Motorsport	(Belgium) Frédéric Bouvy (Belgium) Nicolas Kropp (Belgium) Jean-Michel Martin	Porsche 911 GT3-R	D	83
40 DNF	GTN	97	(Belgium) PSI Motorsport	(Belgium) Frédéric Bouvy (Belgium) Nicolas Kropp (Belgium) Jean-Michel Martin	Porsche 3.6L Flat-6	D	83
41 DNF	GTN	90	(Netherlands) Zwaan's Racing	(Netherlands) Arjan van der Zwaan (Netherlands) Rob van der Zwaan (Belgium) Marc Goossens	Chrysler Viper GTS-R	D	80
41 DNF	GTN	90	(Netherlands) Zwaan's Racing	(Netherlands) Arjan van der Zwaan (Netherlands) Rob van der Zwaan (Belgium) Marc Goossens	Chrysler 8.0L V10	D	80
42 DNF	GTN	94	(Belgium) Ice Pol Racing Team	(Belgium) Philippe Menage (Belgium) Christophe Geoffroy (Belgium) Philippe de Cornelis (Belgium) Michel Duquesnoy	Porsche 911 GT2	D	78
42 DNF	GTN	94	(Belgium) Ice Pol Racing Team	(Belgium) Philippe Menage (Belgium) Christophe Geoffroy (Belgium) Philippe de Cornelis (Belgium) Michel Duquesnoy	Porsche 3.8L Turbo Flat-6	D	78
43 DNF	SMM	113	(France) Emeraude Racing	(France) Didier Caradec (France) Olivier Baron (France) Christophe Huet (France) André-Alain Corbel	BMW Z3	P	75
43 DNF	SMM	113	(France) Emeraude Racing	(France) Didier Caradec (France) Olivier Baron (France) Christophe Huet (France) André-Alain Corbel	BMW 3.2L I6	P	75
44 DNF	GTN	99	(Belgium) Widi Racing	(Belgium) Bernard de Dryver (Belgium) Max Weisenburger (Finland) Risto Virtanen	Marcos Mantara LM600	M	74
44 DNF	GTN	99	(Belgium) Widi Racing	(Belgium) Bernard de Dryver (Belgium) Max Weisenburger (Finland) Risto Virtanen	Chevrolet 5.9L V8	M	74
45 DNF	SMM	117	(Germany) Land Motorsport	(Germany) Peter Scharmach (Germany) Wolfgang Destree (Germany) Kersten Jodexnis (Germany) Wolfgang Haugg	Porsche 911 GT3 Cup	D	57
45 DNF	SMM	117	(Germany) Land Motorsport	(Germany) Peter Scharmach (Germany) Wolfgang Destree (Germany) Kersten Jodexnis (Germany) Wolfgang Haugg	Porsche 3.6L Flat-6	D	57
46 DNF	GT	22	(Italy) BMS Scuderia Italia	(Netherlands) Peter Kox (Switzerland) Enzo Calderari (Switzerland) Frédéric Dor	Ferrari 550-GTS Maranello	M	41
46 DNF	GT	22	(Italy) BMS Scuderia Italia	(Netherlands) Peter Kox (Switzerland) Enzo Calderari (Switzerland) Frédéric Dor	Ferrari 5.9L V12	M	41
47 DNF	GT	5	(France) Force One Racing	(France) David Hallyday (France) Philippe Alliot (France) François Jakubowski (Italy) Vittorio Zoboli	Ferrari 550 Maranello	M	33
47 DNF	GT	5	(France) Force One Racing	(France) David Hallyday (France) Philippe Alliot (France) François Jakubowski (Italy) Vittorio Zoboli	Ferrari 6.0L V12	M	33
48 DNF	N-GT	52	(France) JMB Competition	(Italy) Ludovico Manfredi (France) Batti Pregliasco	Ferrari 360 Modena N-GT	P	32
48 DNF	N-GT	52	(France) JMB Competition	(Italy) Ludovico Manfredi (France) Batti Pregliasco	Ferrari 3.6L V8	P	32
49 DNF	N-GT; 2L	125	(France) Signa Driving School	(Belgium) Patrick Chaillet (Belgium) Thierry de Bonhomme (Italy) Giovanni Bruno	Renault Spider	M	31
49 DNF	N-GT; 2L	125	(France) Signa Driving School	(Belgium) Patrick Chaillet (Belgium) Thierry de Bonhomme (Italy) Giovanni Bruno	Renault 2.0L I4	M	31
50 DNF	GT	16	(Germany) Proton Competition	(Germany) Gerold Ried (Germany) Christian Ried (Austria) Horst Felbermayr Sr. (Austria) Horst Felbermayr Jr.	Porsche 911 GT2	Y	14
50 DNF	GT	16	(Germany) Proton Competition	(Germany) Gerold Ried (Germany) Christian Ried (Austria) Horst Felbermayr Sr. (Austria) Horst Felbermayr Jr.	Porsche 3.8L Turbo Flat-6	Y	14

== Statistics ==
- Pole position – #23 BMS Scuderia Italia – 2:16.393
- Fastest lap – #23 BMS Scuderia Italia – 2:18.745
- Distance – 3665.168 km
- Average speed – 152.478 km/h

FIA GT Championship
Previous race: 2002 FIA GT Oschersleben 500km	2002 season	Next race: 2002 FIA GT Pergusa 500km
