= Horst Felbermayr Jr. =

Austrian racing driver (born 1970)

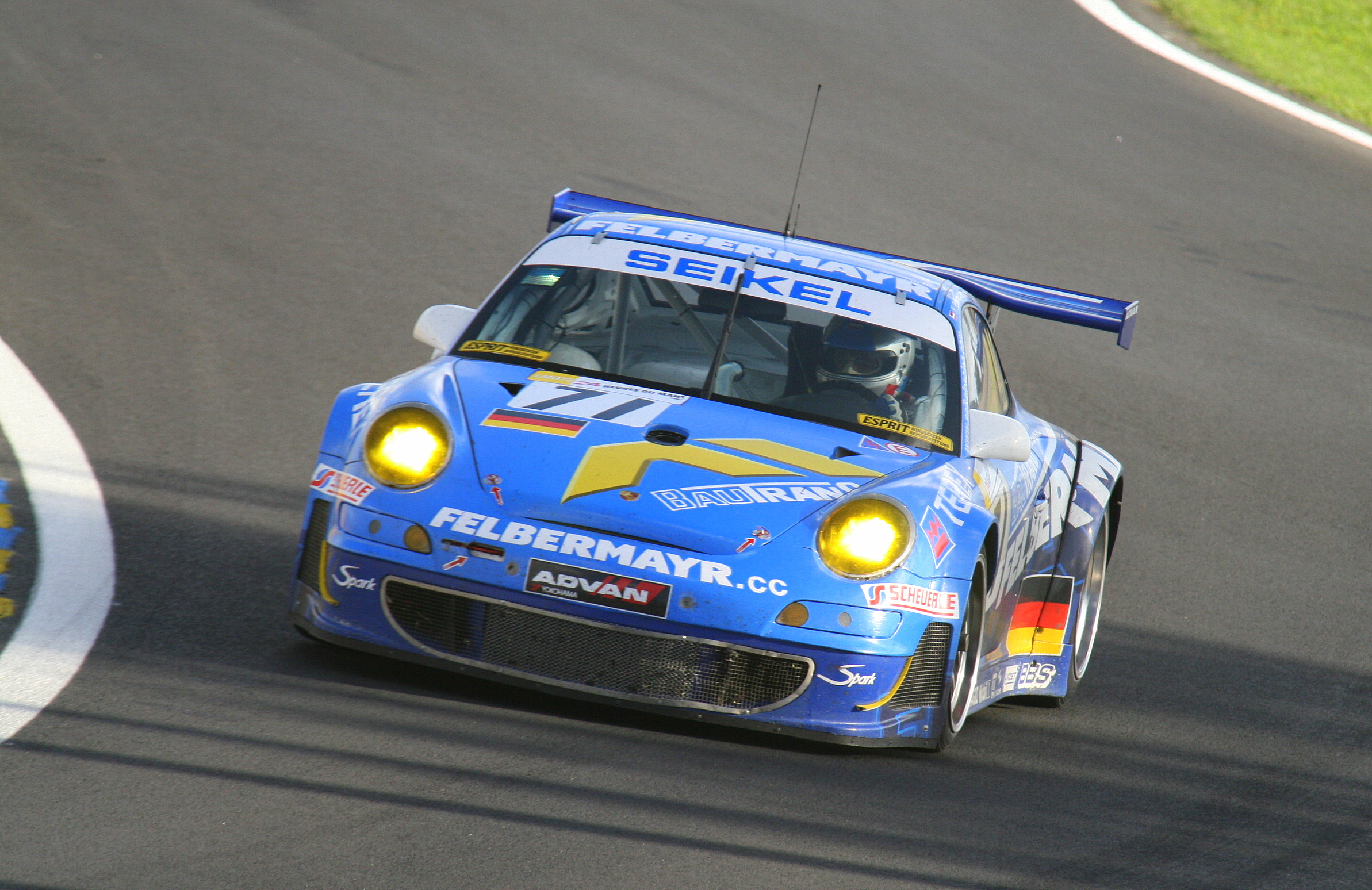
- Felbermayr in 2007
- Nationality: (Austria) Austrian
- Born: Horst Rainer Felbermayr Jr. 30 November 1970 (age 55) Wels, Austria
- Relatives: Horst Felbermayr (father); Horst Felix Felbermayr (son); Emma Felbermayr (daughter)
- Categorisation: FIA Silver (until 2016); FIA Bronze (2017–)

Championship titles
- 2008: Radical European Masters – SR3

Horst Rainer Felbermayr Jr. (born 30 November 1970) is an Austrian businessman and racing driver who last competed in the LMP2 Pro-Am class of the European Le Mans Series for Proton Competition.

== Business ventures and personal life ==
Since 2015, Felbermayr has been the CEO of the Felbermayr construction and transport company, which was founded by his grandfather Franz in 1942. His late father Horst Sr. raced with him at the 24 Hours of Le Mans multiple times, while his children Horst Felix and Emma are also racing drivers.

== Career ==
Felbermayr made his car racing debut in 1997, racing for Augustin Motorsport in the GT1 class of the FIA GT Championship. Remaining in the series on a part-time basis for the following four seasons, Felbermayr primarily drove a Porsche 911 in the GT class, but scored his best result of seventh at the A1 Ring in 2000 driving a Chrysler Viper GTS-R for Chamberlain Motorsport. During this period, Felbermayr also raced at the 24 Hours of Daytona for Porsche-affiliated Proton Competition in 2000 and 2001 in the GTO and GTS classes, respectively.

The following year, Felbermayr returned to the 24 Hours of Daytona with RWS Motorsport in the GT class, before returning to the team for select appearances in the N-GT class of the FIA GT Championship, in which he finished second at Oschersleben and Donington Park. Felbermayr then remained in the N-GT class for the following two seasons, as he made select appearances for Proton Competition and JVG Racing in both seasons, taking a best result of fifth at the 2004 Spa 24 Hours for the former.

Joining Seikel Motorsport to race in the GT2 class of the Le Mans Endurance Series for 2005, Felbermayr scored a pair ot third-place finishes at Monza and Istanbul Park to finish fourth in points. During 2005, Felbermayr also raced at the Spa 24 Hours for Proton Competition, in which he finished third in the GT2 class. Continuing with the newly rebranded Team Felbermayr-Proton race in the FIA GT Championship in 2006, scoring a best result of fourth at Silverstone and Dijon to end the year 11th in the GT2 standings in his only full-time season in FIA GT. Remaining with the team for 2007, Felbermayr mainly raced in the Le Mans Series, in which he scored a best result of fourth at Valencia to finish 16th in the GT2 standings. During 2007, Felbermayr also raced for the same team at the 24 Hours of Le Mans, as well as a one-off appearance in the FIA GT Championship at Bucharest, in which he finished third in GT2.

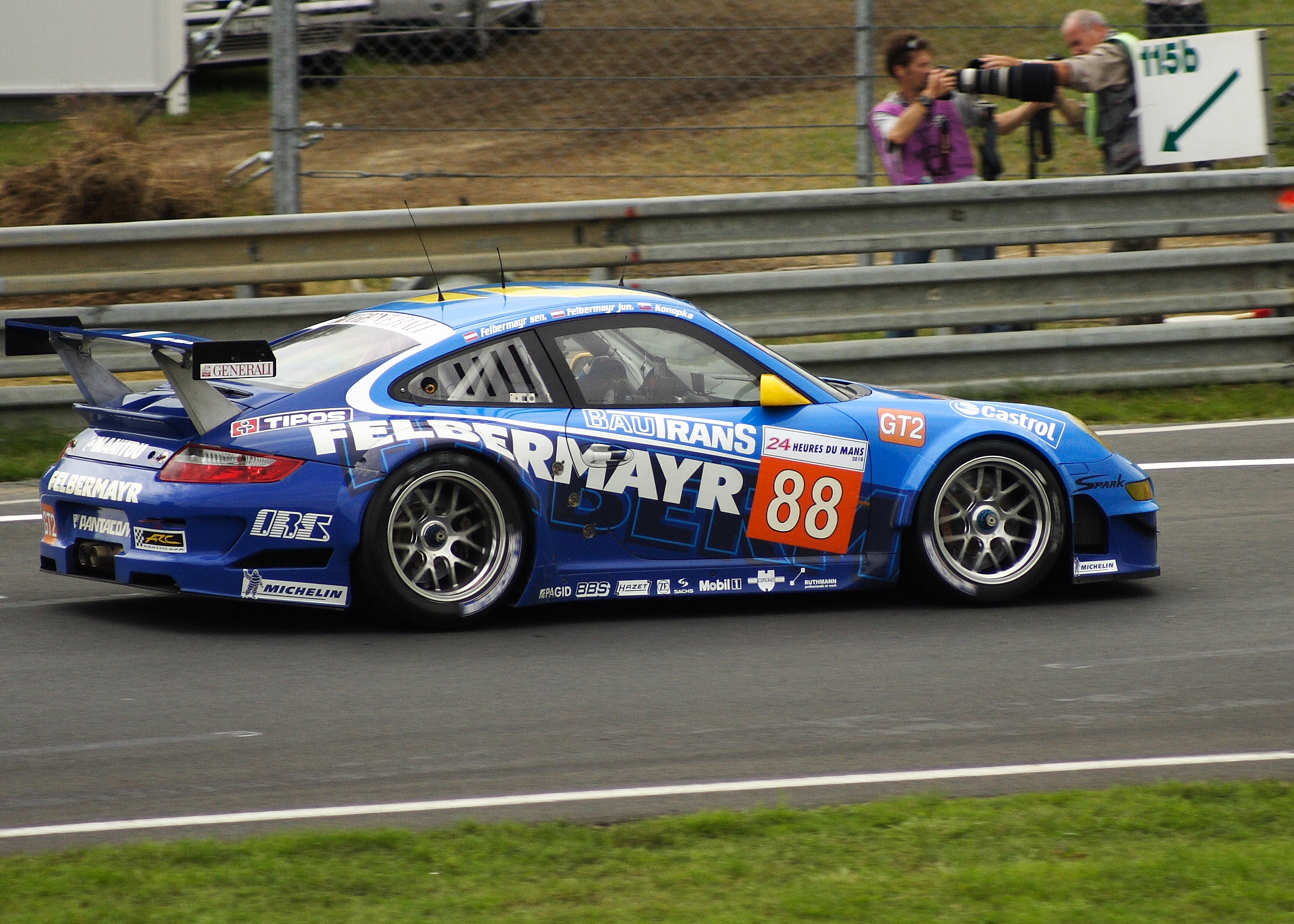
Felbermayr's No. 88 Proton Competition Porsche at the 2010 24 Hours of Le Mans.

Continuing with Proton for 2008, Felbermayr took a best result of third at Spa, which helped him end the year 14th in the GT2 standings. In parallel, Felbermayr raced in the Radical European Masters for Rübig Motorsport, in which he took the SR3 title with two wins to his name. Another season in the Le Mans Series then ensued, during which he returned to the 24 Hours of Le Mans, before only racing at the French enduro and the 1000 km of Hungaroring the following year. In 2011, Felbermayr made his full-time return to the Le Mans Series in the then-new LMGTE Am class, scoring a lone win at Le Castellet and a podium at Estoril to finish third in points. During 2011, Felbermayr also made his fourth appearance at the 24 Hours of Le Mans for the same team.

After spending 2012 on the sidelines, Felbermayr raced at the 3 Hours of Red Bull Ring in both 2013 and 2014 for Proton in LMGTE, as well as his debut in the 24 Hours of Nürburgring in the latter year for Car Collection Motorsport in the SP9 class. Following another year on the sidelines, Felbermayr returned to Car Collection Motorsport as it began fielding an Audi R8 LMS, partaking in select races of the 24H Series and the Blancpain GT Series Endurance Cup. Returning to the team for a part-time schedule in the 24H Series for 2017, Felbermayr scored an overall win at the 12 Hours of Imola alongside Max Edelhoff, Toni Forné and Dimitri Parhofer. In 2018, Felbermayr returned to Car Collection Motorsport to race at the 12 Hours of Imola, as making a one-off appearance in the GT4 European Series at the Nürburgring for Reiter.

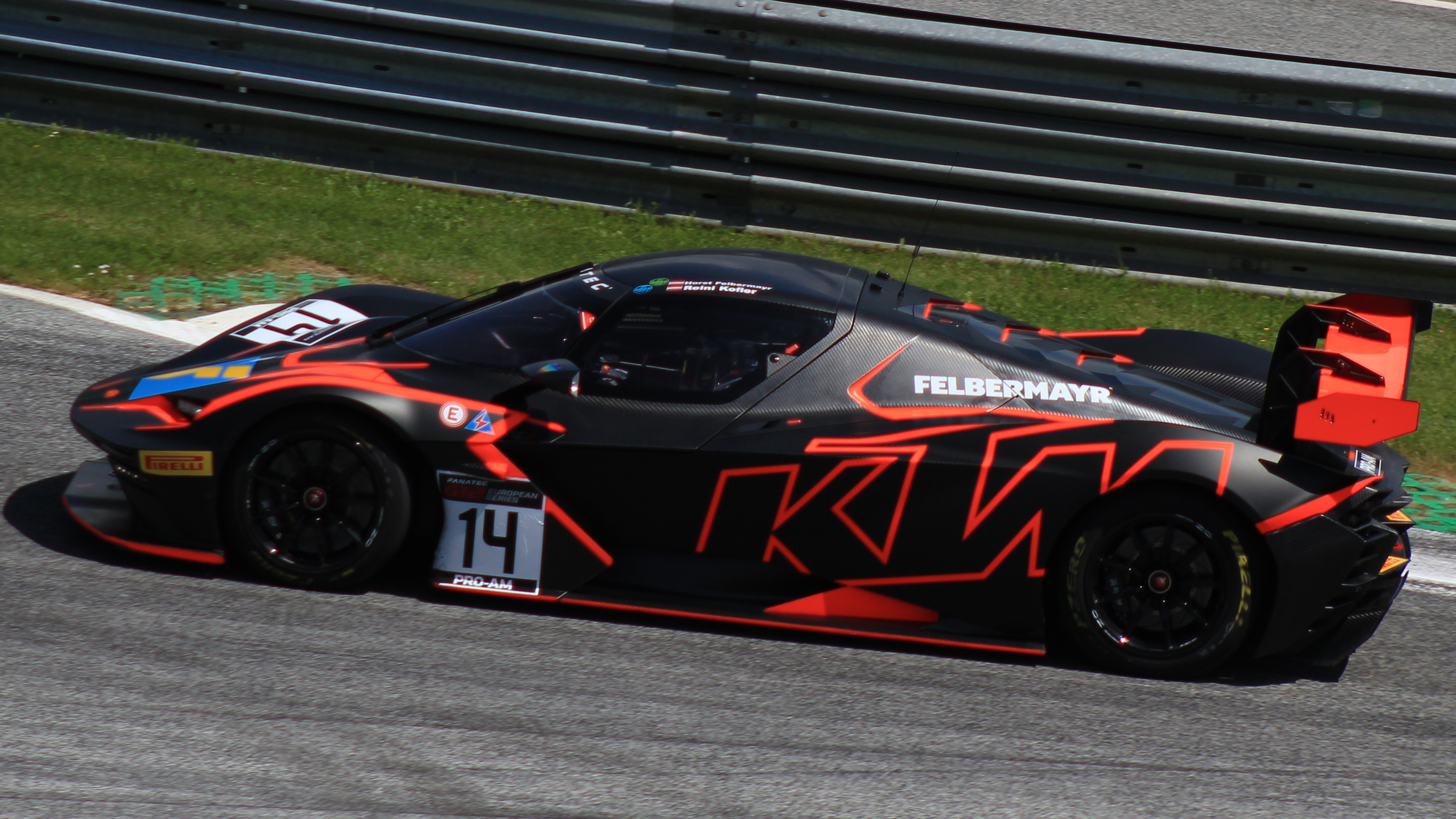
Felbermayr made a GT2 cameo at the Red Bull Ring in 2022 in a KTM X-Bow.

Returning to Proton for 2019, Felbermayr only raced in the season-opening 4 Hours of Le Castellet of the European Le Mans Series in LMGTE. The following year, Felbermayr returned to the 24 Hours of Le Mans, racing for Proton in LMGTE Am alongside Michele Beretta and Max van Splunteren. In 2021, Felbermayr returned to KTM-affiliated Reiter Engineering to race in the GTX class of the 24H GT Series, scoring wins at Mugello, Le Castellet and Barcelona to secure runner-up honors in the class standings. Felbermayr then joined RLR MSport to race in the LMP3 class of the European Le Mans Series the following year, as well as select rounds of the Le Mans Cup. During 2022, Felbermayr also made a one-off appearance in the GT2 European Series for KTM True Racing at the Red Bull Ring, where he finished on the Pro-Am podium in both races.

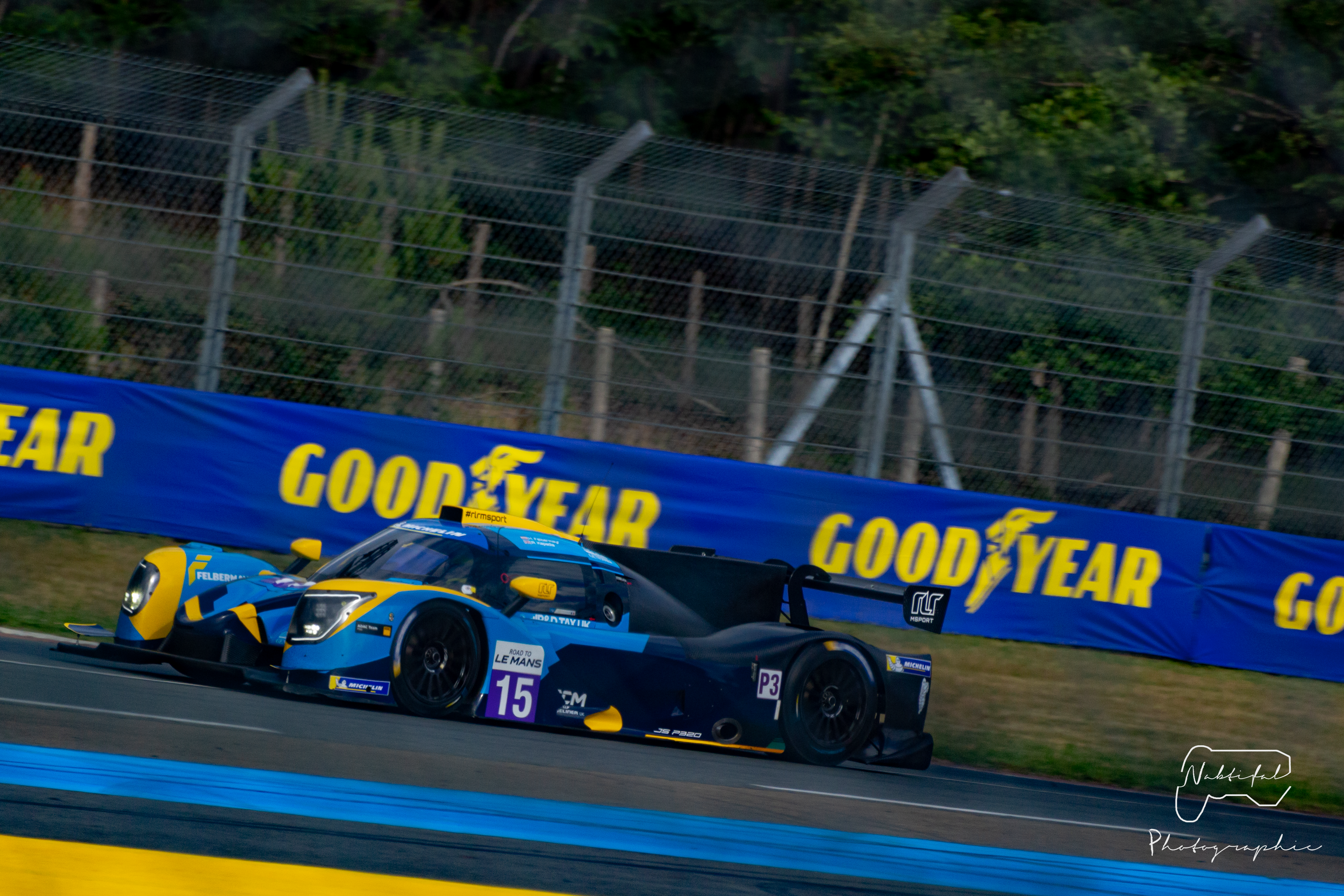
Felbermayr racing for RLR MSport in LMP3 at the 2022 Road to Le Mans.

Remaining in LMP3 competition for 2023, Felbermayr returned to RLR MSport to once again race in the European Le Mans Series, in which he took a best result of fourth twice and ended the year seventh in points. Felbermayr then switched to the Le Mans Cup and Reiter Engineering for the following year, taking a best result of seventh at Algarve but wasn't eligible for points as he was a guest driver. Continuing with the team in the series for 2025, Felbermayr was joined by his son Horst Felix as they raced in the LMP3 Pro-Am class, taking a best class result of fifth at Barcelona to end the year 13th in points. During 2025, Felbermayr also returned to Proton Competition to compete in the final two rounds of that year's European Le Mans Series in LMGT3.

At the end of 2025, Felbermayr remained with Proton to race in the LMP2 class of the 2025–26 Asian Le Mans Series, scoring a best result of fifth in race two at Sepang to end the season 15th in points. Felbermayr stayed with the team for the rest of 2026, to race in the LMP2 Pro-Am class of the European Le Mans Series, taking four points finishes and ending the season 16th in the standings. Felbermayr then remained with Proton at the end of the year, as he returned to the 2026–27 Asian Le Mans Series to race in the LMP2 class.

== Racing record ==
=== Racing career summary ===
Season	Series	Team	Races	Wins	Poles	F/Laps	Podiums	Points	Position
1997	FIA GT Championship – GT1	Augustin Motorsport	2	0	0	0	0	0	NC
1998	FIA GT Championship – GT2	Proton Competition	7	0	0	0	0	0	NC
1999	FIA GT Championship – GT2	RWS	7	0	0	0	0	0	NC
1999	French GT Championship – GT2	RWS	1	0	0	0	0	0	NC
2000	24 Hours of Daytona – GTO	Proton Competition	1	0	0	0	0	—N/a	12th
2000	FIA GT Championship – GT	RWS	4	0	0	0	0	0	NC
2000	FIA GT Championship – GT	Felbermayr	1	0	0	0	0	0	NC
2000	FIA GT Championship – GT	Chamberlain Motorsport	1	0	0	0	0	0	NC
2000	American Le Mans Series – GTS	Chamberlain Motorsport	1	0	0	0	0	12	49th
2001	24 Hours of Daytona – GTS	Proton Competition	1	0	0	0	0	—N/a	9th
2001	FIA GT Championship – GT	Proton Competition	4	0	0	0	0	0	NC
2002	24 Hours of Daytona – GT	RWS Motorsport	1	0	0	0	0	—N/a	DNF
2002	FIA GT Championship – GT	Proton Competition	5	0	0	0	0	0	NC
2002	FIA GT Championship – N-GT	RWS Motorsport	3	0	0	0	2	14	16th
2003	FIA GT Championship – N-GT	Proton Competition	1	0	0	0	0	0	NC
2003	FIA GT Championship – N-GT	JVG Racing	2	0	0	0	0	0	NC
2004	FIA GT Championship – N-GT	JVG Racing	1	0	0	0	0	10	21st
2004	FIA GT Championship – N-GT	Proton Competition	3	0	0	0	0	10	21st
2005	Le Mans Endurance Series – GT2	Seikel Motorsport	5	0	0	0	2	18	4th
2005	FIA GT Championship – GT2	Proton Competition	1	0	0	0	1	11	17th
2006	FIA GT Championship – GT2	Team Felbermayr-Proton	10	0	0	0	0	25.5	11th
2007	Le Mans Series – GT2	Team Felbermayr-Proton	5	0	0	0	0	7	16th
2007	FIA GT Championship – GT2	Team Felbermayr-Proton	1	0	0	0	1	6	27th
2007	24 Hours of Le Mans – GT2	Seikel Motorsport	1	0	0	0	0	—N/a	DNF
2008	Le Mans Series – GT2	Team Felbermayr-Proton	5	0	0	0	1	10	14th
2008	FIA GT Championship – GT2	Team Felbermayr-Proton	2	0	0	0	0	0	NC
2008	Radical European Masters – SR3	Rübig Motorsport	12	2	3	1	5	222	**1st**
2009	Le Mans Series – GT2	Team Felbermayr-Proton	5	0	0	0	0	5	16th
2009	24 Hours of Le Mans – GT2	IMSA Performance Matmut	1	0	0	0	0	—N/a	DNF
2010	24 Hours of Le Mans – LMGT2	Team Felbermayr-Proton	1	0	0	0	0	—N/a	8th
2010	Le Mans Series – GT2	Team Felbermayr-Proton	1	0	0	0	0	4	22nd
2011	Le Mans Series – LMGTE Am	Team Felbermayr-Proton	5	1	4	0	2	44	**3rd**
2011	Intercontinental Le Mans Cup – LMGTE Am	Team Felbermayr-Proton	4	0	0	0	0	0	NC
2011	24 Hours of Le Mans – LMGTE Pro	Team Felbermayr-Proton	1	0	0	0	0	—N/a	DNF
2013	European Le Mans Series – LMGTE	Proton Competition	1	0	0	0	0	8	13th
2014	European Le Mans Series – LMGTE	Proton Competition	1	0	0	0	0	0.5	27th
2014	24 Hours of Nürburgring – SP9	Car Collection Motorsport	1	0	0	0	0	—N/a	NC
2016	24H Series – A6	Car Collection Motorsport	3	0	0	0	0	0	NC
2016	Blancpain GT Series Endurance Cup – Pro-Am	Car Collection Motorsport	1	0	0	0	0	0	NC
2017	24H Series – A6	Car Collection Motorsport	4	1	0	0	1	0	NC
2018	24H GT Series – A6-Am	Car Collection Motorsport	1	0	0	0	0	7	NC
2018	GT4 European Series – Pro-Am	Felbermayr - Reiter	2	0	0	0	0	0	NC
2019	European Le Mans Series – LMGTE	Proton Competition	1	0	0	0	0	6	19th
2020	24 Hours of Le Mans – LMGTE Am	Proton Competition	1	0	0	0	0	—N/a	12th
2021	24H GT Series – GTX	Reiter Engineering	4	3	0	0	4	81	**2nd**
2021	Le Mans Cup – LMP3	RLR MSport	1	0	0	0	0	0	NC†
2022	European Le Mans Series – LMP3	RLR MSport	6	0	0	0	0	18	15th
2022	Le Mans Cup – LMP3	RLR MSport	3	0	0	0	0	0	46th
2022	GT2 European Series – Pro-Am	KTM True Racing	2	0	0	0	2	33	8th
2023	European Le Mans Series – LMP3	RLR MSport	6	0	1	0	0	51	7th
2023	Prototype Cup Germany	Reiter Engineering	2	0	0	0	0	0	NC
2024	Le Mans Cup – LMP3	Reiter Engineering	7	0	0	0	0	0	NC†
2025	Le Mans Cup – LMP3 Pro-Am	Reiter Engineering	6	0	0	0	0	28	13th
2025	European Le Mans Series – LMGT3	Proton Competition	2	0	0	0	0	10	19th
2025–26	Asian Le Mans Series – LMP2	Proton Competition	6	0	0	0	0	19	15th
2026	European Le Mans Series – LMP2 Pro-Am	Proton Competition	6	0	0	0	0	6	16th
2026	24 Hours of Le Mans – LMP2 Pro-Am	Proton Competition	1	0	0	0	0	—N/a	6th
2026–27	Asian Le Mans Series – LMP2	Proton Competition						*	*

^{†} As Felbermayr was a guest driver, he was ineligible to score points.

=== Complete FIA GT Championship results ===
(key) (Races in bold indicate pole position) (Races in italics indicate fastest lap)

Year	Team	Car	Class	1	2	3	4	5	6	7	8	9	10	11	12	13	Pos.	Pts
1997	Augustin Motorsport	Porsche 911 GT2	GT1	HOC	SIL	HEL	NÜR	SPA	A1R; Ret	SUZ	DON; 16	MUG	SEB	LAG			NC	0
1998	Proton Competition	Porsche 911 GT2	GT2	OSC; 11	SIL; Ret	HOC; 8	DIJ; 8	HUN; 10	SUZ	DON; 8	A1R; 12	HOM	LAG				NC	0
1999	RWS	Porsche 911 GT2	GT	MNZ; 12	SIL; 11	HOC; Ret	HUN; 15	ZOL; Ret	OSC; 11	DON; Ret	HOM	GLN	ZHU				NC	0
2000	RWS	Porsche 911 GT2	GT	VAL; 10	EST; 13	MNZ; Ret		HUN; 11	ZOL								NC	0
2000	Felbermayr	Chrysler Viper GTS-R	GT				SIL; 10										NC	0
2000	Chamberlain Motorsport	Chrysler Viper GTS-R	GT							A1R; 7	LAU	BRN	MAG				NC	0
2001	Proton Competition	Porsche 911 GT2	GT	MNZ	BRN	MAG	SIL	ZOL	HUN; Ret	SPA; 6H	SPA; 12H	SPA; 24H	A1R; NC	NÜR	JAR; Ret	EST; 8	NC	0
2002	Proton Competition	Porsche 911 GT2	GT	MAG; Ret	SIL	BRN; NC	JAR; 9	AND		SPA; 6H ?	SPA; 12H ?	SPA; 24H; Ret			EST; Ret		NC	0
2002	RWS Motorsport	Porsche 911 GT3-R	N-GT						OSC; 2				PER; 5	DON; 2			16th	14
2003	Proton Competition	Porsche 911 GT3-RS	N-GT	CAT	MAG	PER	BRN	DON	SPA; 6H; 15	SPA; 12H; 9	SPA; 24H; Ret	AND					NC	0
2003	JVG Racing	Porsche 911 GT3-RS	N-GT										OSC; 12	EST	MNZ; 13		NC	0
2004	JVG Racing	Porsche 911 GT3 RS	N-GT	MNZ	VAL	MAG	HOC	BRN; 7	DON								21st	10
2004	Proton Competition	Porsche 911 GT3 RS	N-GT							SPA; 6H; 5	SPA; 12H; 7	SPA; 24H; 5	IMO	OSC	DUB; 8	ZHU; Ret	21st	10
2005	Proton Competition	Porsche 911 GT3 RSR	GT2	MNZ	MAG	SIL	IMO	BRN	SPA; 6H; 5	SPA; 12H; 3	SPA; 24H; 3	OSC	IST	ZHU	DUB	BHR	17th	11
2006	Team Felbermayr-Proton	Porsche 911 GT3 RSR	GT2	SIL; 4	BRN; 7	OSC; 7	SPA; 6H; 9	SPA; 12H; 8	SPA; 24H; 5	LEC; Ret	DIJ; 4	MUG; 6	HUN; 6	ADR; Ret	DUB; 8		11th	25.5
2007	Team Felbermayr-Proton	Porsche 911 GT3 RSR	GT2	ZHU	SIL	BUC; 3	MNZ	OSC	SPA; 6H	SPA; 12H	SPA; 24H	ADR	BRN	NOG	ZOL		27th	6
2008	Team Felbermayr-Proton	Porsche 911 GT3 RSR	GT2	SIL	MNZ	ADR	OSC	SPA; 6H	SPA; 12H	SPA; 24H	BUC; 1; 17	BUC; 2 Ret	BRN	NOG	ZOL	SAN	NC	0

=== Complete European Le Mans Series results ===
(key) (Races in bold indicate pole position; results in italics indicate fastest lap)

Year	Entrant	Class	Chassis	Engine	1	2	3	4	5	6	Rank	Points
2005	Seikel Motorsport	GT2	Porsche 997 GT3-RSR	Porsche 3.8 L Flat-6	SPA; 4	MNZ; 3	SIL; 8	NÜR; Ret	IST; 3		4th	18
2007	Team Felbermayr-Proton	GT2	Porsche 997 GT3-RSR	Porsche 3.8 L Flat-6	MNZ; Ret	VAL; 5	NÜR; 13	SPA; 7	SIL; Ret	INT; 8	16th	7
2008	Team Felbermayr-Proton	GT2	Porsche 997 GT3-RSR	Porsche 3.8 L Flat-6	CAT; 9	MNZ; Ret	SPA; 3	NÜR; 9	SIL; 5		14th	10
2009	Team Felbermayr-Proton	GT2	Porsche 997 GT3-RSR	Porsche 4.0 L Flat-6	CAT; 7	SPA; 11	ALG; Ret	NÜR; 7	SIL; 8		16th	5
2010	Team Felbermayr-Proton	GT2	Porsche 997 GT3-RSR	Porsche 4.0 L Flat-6	LEC	SPA	ALG	HUN; 11	SIL		22nd	4
2011	Team Felbermayr-Proton	LMGTE Am	Porsche 997 GT3-RSR	Porsche 4.0 L Flat-6	LEC; 1	SPA; 5	IMO; NC	SIL; 6	EST; 3		3rd	44
2013	Proton Competition	LMGTE	Porsche 997 GT3-RSR	Porsche 4.0 L Flat-6	SIL	IMO	RBR; 6	HUN	LEC		13th	8
2014	Proton Competition	LMGTE	Porsche 997 GT3-RSR	Porsche M97/74 4.0 L Flat-6	SIL	IMO	RBR; 11	LEC	EST		27th	0.5
2019	Proton Competition	LMGTE	Porsche 911 RSR	Porsche 4.0 L Flat-6	LEC; 7	MNZ	CAT	SIL	SPA	ALG	19th	6
2022	RLR MSport	LMP3	Ligier JS P320	Nissan VK56DE 5.6L V8	LEC; Ret	IMO; 6	MNZ; Ret	CAT; 8	SPA; Ret	ALG; 7	15th	18
2023	RLR MSport	LMP3	Ligier JS P320	Nissan VK56DE 5.6L V8	CAT; 9	LEC; 4	ARA; 4	SPA; 6	PRT; 6	**ALG**; 6	7th	51
2025	Proton Competition	LMGT3	Porsche 911 GT3 R (992)	Porsche M97/80 4.2 L Flat-6	CAT	LEC	IMO	SPA	SIL; 5	ALG; 13	19th	10
2026	Proton Competition	LMP2 Pro-Am	Oreca 07	Gibson GK428 4.2 L V8	CAT; 9	LEC; 12	IMO; 10	SPA; 9	SIL; 12	ALG; 10	16th	6

=== 24 Hours of Le Mans results ===
Year	Team	Co-Drivers	Car	Class	Laps	Pos.	Class Pos.
2007	(Germany) Seikel Motorsport	(United States) Philip Collin (Austria) Horst Felbermayr	Porsche 997 GT3-RSR	GT2	68	DNF	DNF
2009	(France) IMSA Performance Matmut (Germany) Team Felbermayr-Proton	(Austria) Horst Felbermayr (France) Michel Lecourt	Porsche 997 GT3-RSR	GT2	102	DNF	DNF
2010	(Germany) Team Felbermayr-Proton	(Austria) Horst Felbermayr (Slovakia) Miro Konôpka	Porsche 997 GT3-RSR	GT2	304	24th	8th
2011	(Germany) Proton Competition	(Austria) Horst Felbermayr (Germany) Christian Ried	Porsche 997 GT3-RSR	LMGTE Am	199	DNF	DNF
2020	(Germany) Proton Competition	(Italy) Michele Beretta (Netherlands) Max van Splunteren	Porsche 911 RSR	LMGTE Am	330	38th	12th
2026	(Germany) Proton Competition	(Austria) Horst Felix Felbermayr (Spain) Lorenzo Fluxá	Oreca 07-Gibson	LMP2	354	28th	14th
2026	(Germany) Proton Competition	(Austria) Horst Felix Felbermayr (Spain) Lorenzo Fluxá	Oreca 07-Gibson	LMP2 Pro-Am	354	28th	6th

=== Complete GT World Challenge Europe results ===
==== GT World Challenge Europe Endurance Cup ====
(Races in bold indicate pole position) (Races in italics indicate fastest lap)

Year	Team	Car	Class	1	2	3	4	5	6	7	Pos.	Points
2016	Car Collection Motorsport	Audi R8 LMS	Pro-Am	MNZ	SIL	LEC	SPA; 6H	SPA; 12H	SPA; 24H	NÜR; 40	NC	0

=== Complete Le Mans Cup results ===
(key) (Races in bold indicate pole position; results in italics indicate fastest lap)

Year	Entrant	Class	Chassis	1	2	3	4	5	6	7	Rank	Points
2021	RLR MSport	LMP3	Ligier JS P320	BAR	LEC	MNZ	LMS; 1	LMS; 2	SPA	POR; 6	NC†	0†
2022	RLR MSport	LMP3	Ligier JS P320	LEC	IMO	LMS; 1; 16	LMS; 2; 21	MNZ	SPA; Ret	ALG	46th	0
2024	Reiter Engineering	LMP3	Ligier JS P320	CAT; 22	LEC; 9	LMS; 1 Ret	LMS; 2 Ret	SPA; 13	MUG; 14	ALG; 7	NC†	0†
2025	Reiter Engineering	LMP3 Pro-Am	Ligier JS P325	BAR; 5	LEC; 8	LMS; 1; 6	LMS; 2; 11	SPA; Ret	SIL	POR; 6	13th	28

^{†} As Felbermayr was a guest driver, he was ineligible to score points.

=== Complete Asian Le Mans Series results ===
(key) (Races in bold indicate pole position; results in italics indicate fastest lap)

Year	Entrant	Class	Chassis	Engine	1	2	3	4	5	6	Rank	Points
2025–26	Proton Competition	LMP2	Oreca 07	Gibson GK428 4.2 L V8	SEP; 1; 9	SEP; 2; 5	DUB; 1; 10	DUB; 2; 13	ABU; 1; 7	ABU; 2; 13	15th	19
