= Horst Felbermayr =

Austrian racing driver (1945–2020)

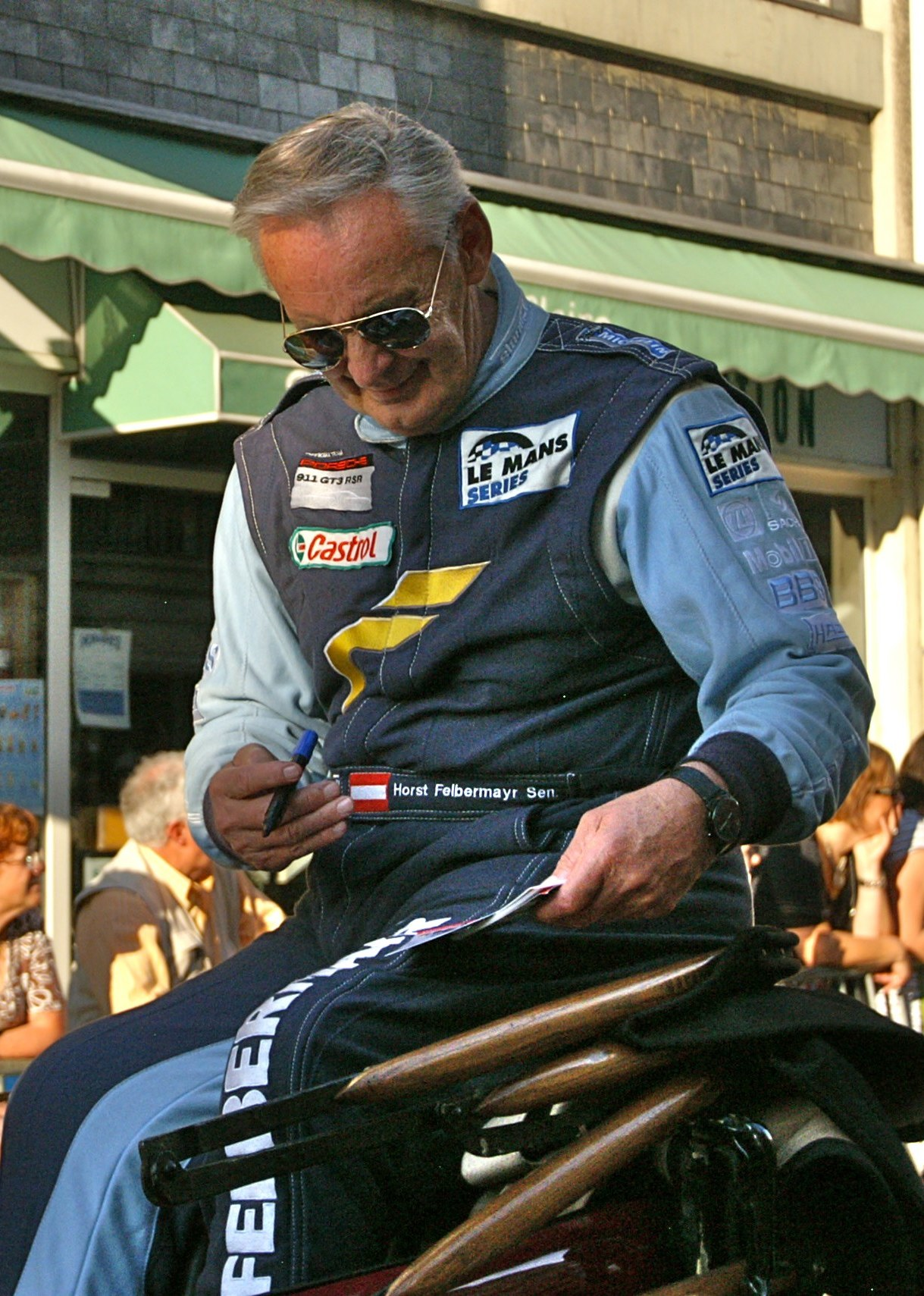
- Felbermayr at the 2010 24 Hours of Le Mans.
- Born: 19 February 1945; Ried im Innkreis, Austria
- Died: 17 March 2020 (aged 75); Wels, Austria
- Occupations: Industrialist; Racing driver
- Categorisation: FIA Bronze
- Relatives: Horst Felbermayr Jr. (son); Emma Felbermayr (granddaughter); Horst Felix Felbermayr (grandson)

Horst Felbermayr Sr. (19 February 1945 – 17 March 2020) was an Austrian industrialist, businessman, and amateur racing driver who participated in six different 24 Hours of Le Mans.

== Biography ==
Felbermayr was a frequent collaborator with the racing team Proton Competition via the Felbermayr construction and transport company, which he led from 1967 until 2015.

Felbermayr died on 17 March 2020 at the age of 75. Felbermayr's son Horst Jr. and grandchildren, Horst Felix and Emma, are also racing drivers.

== Racing results ==
=== 24 Hours of Le Mans results ===
| Year | Team | Co-Drivers | Car | Class | Laps | Pos. | Class Pos. |
|---|---|---|---|---|---|---|---|
| 2005 | (Germany) Seikel Motorsport | (United States) Philip Collin (Canada) David Shep | Porsche 911 GT3-RSR | GT2 | 274 | 23rd | 7th |
| 2007 | (Germany) Seikel Motorsport | (United States) Philip Collin (Austria) Horst Felbermayr Jr. | Porsche 997 GT3-RSR | GT2 | 68 | DNF | DNF |
| 2008 | (Germany) Team Felbermayr-Proton | (Australia) Alex Davison (Germany) Wolf Henzler | Porsche 997 GT3-RSR | GT2 | 309 | 27th | 5th |
| 2009 | (France) IMSA Performance Matmut (Germany) Team Felbermayr-Proton | (Austria) Horst Felbermayr Jr. (France) Michel Lecourt | Porsche 997 GT3-RSR | GT2 | 102 | DNF | DNF |
| 2010 | (Germany) Team Felbermayr-Proton | (Austria) Horst Felbermayr Jr. (Slovakia) Miro Konôpka | Porsche 997 GT3-RSR | GT2 | 304 | 24th | 8th |
| 2011 | (Germany) Proton Competition | (Austria) Horst Felbermayr Jr. (Germany) Christian Ried | Porsche 997 GT3-RSR | LMGTE; Am | 199 | DNF | DNF |
