= Proton Competition =

German auto racing team

(Germany) Proton Competition
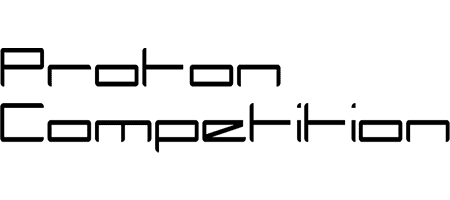
- Founded: 1996
- Base: Ummendorf, Baden-Württemberg, Germany
- Team principal(s): Christian Ried
- Current series: FIA World Endurance Championship; European Le Mans Series; IMSA Sportscar Championship; GT World Challenge Europe
- Former series: BPR Global GT Series; FIA GT Championship; Asian Le Mans Series; Intercontinental Le Mans Cup; Le Mans Series
- Current drivers: (Germany) Christopher Mies (Norway) Dennis Olsen (Belgium) Frédéric Vervisch (Italy) Gianmaria Bruni (Belgium) Alessio Picariello (United States) Ryan Hardwick (Italy) Giammarco Levorato (United States) Corey Lewis (United Kingdom) Ben Barker (Canada) Zacharie Robichon (Denmark) Mikkel O. Pedersen (Italy) Giorgio Roda (Italy) Matteo Cairoli (France) Macéo Capietto (Germany) Jonas Ried (Austria) René Binder (Netherlands) Bent Viscaal (France) Julien Andlauer (Italy) Matteo Cressoni (Italy) Claudio Schiavoni (Switzerland) Neel Jani (United Kingdom) Harry Tincknell (Chile) Nicolás Pino (Argentina) Nicolás Varrone
- Teams' Championships: 5 (LMS 2009, 2010, ILMC 2010) GT2, (ELMS 2018, 2020, 2023) GTE
- Drivers' Championships: 3 (LMS 2009, 2010) GT2, (ELMS 2020) GTE
- Website: http://proton-competition.com

Proton Competition (also formerly racing as Dempsey-Proton Racing or Team Felbermayr-Proton) is a German auto racing team based in Ummendorf, Baden-Württemberg. It was founded by Gerold Ried, and is currently owned by his son Christian Ried. The team currently competes in the FIA World Endurance Championship with a customer Porsche 963 and a factory-supported Ford Mustang GT3. It also competes in the European Le Mans Series with the Oreca 07 and the Porsche 911. They also have a racing program in the IMSA SportsCar Championship, racing with a customer Porsche 963 and a factory-supported Ford Mustang GT3 and prepare Porsche 911s for the Iron Dames program.

== History ==
=== Beginnings and early years ===
The team was founded in 1996 by Gerold Ried. Ried entered two GT2-spec Porsche 911 GT2 to compete it in the BPR Global GT Series. Both cars #51 and #69 got six points each in the Teams Championship. 1997 saw Proton compete in the inaugural FIA GT Championship season running one 911 GT2. The team earned only one point throughout the season. Proton also competed at that year's Daytona 24 Hours which saw the team finish 27th overall. Between 1998 and 2002 saw little success for the team. They competed in the same 911 GT2 between these years mostly with the father/son partnership of Gerold and Christian Ried. The team raced the same car in the first few races of the 2003 season before moving down a class from GT to N-GT after purchasing a Porsche 996 GT3-RS They only picked up one point in the season at the final round in Monza.

=== 2004–2006 ===
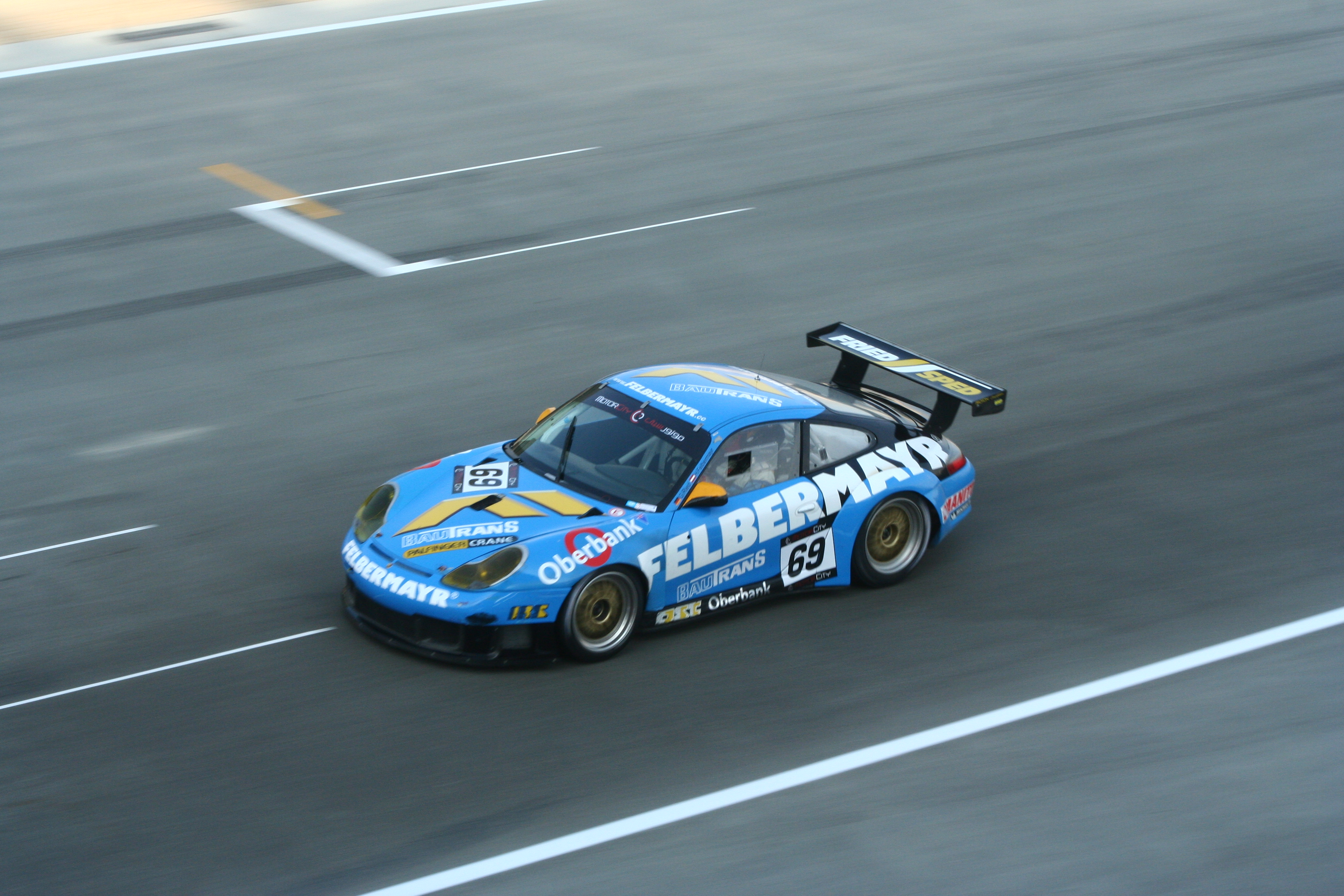
Team Felbermayr-Proton Porsche 996 GT3-RS at the 2006 FIA GT Dubai 500km

Things picked up for the team in 2004 where the team finished fourth in the Teams Championship. Their best race finish was third at the opening round in Monza, the same venue where they scored their only point in the 2003 season. 2005 saw Proton finish second in the Teams Championship, although in a GT2 class that was simply dominated by Gruppe M Racing who won every race in the GT2 class that season. Proton earned 45 points, some 135 points behind Gruppe M. Team Cytosport finished fourth in the LMP1 teams championship. The team changed its name for the upcoming 2006 season to Team Felbermayr-Proton after Horst Felbermayr Sr. became part of the team. A new colour scheme was also introduced changing from the orange/red and black to a light blue livery, a similar livery to the one used by the team now. It did not bring them as much success as 2005 however, with the team finishing fifth in the Teams Championship. The driver pairing of Christian Ried and Horst Felbermayr Jr. finished eleventh in the Drivers Championship.

=== 2007 ===
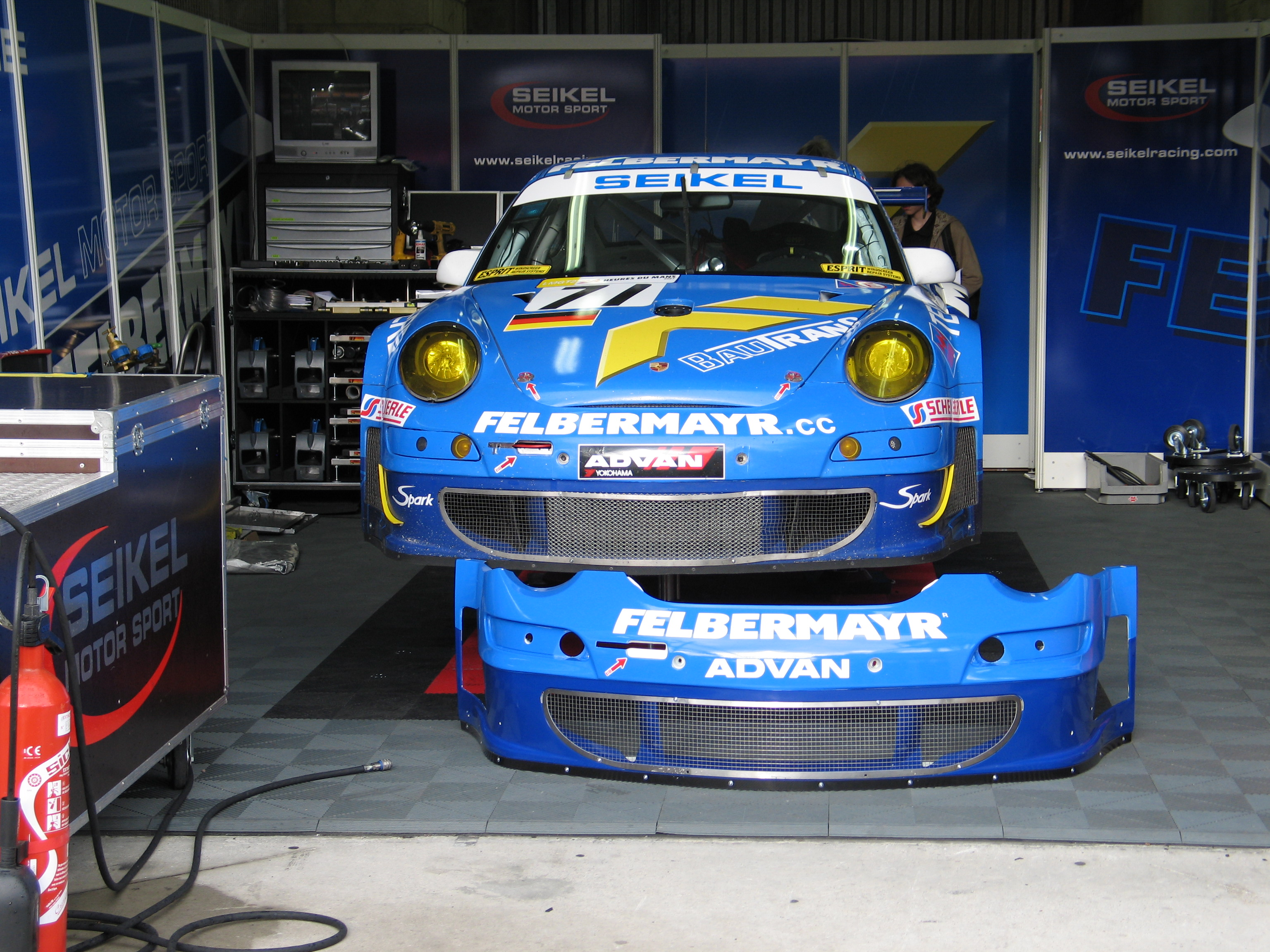
Seikel Motorsport/Team Felbermayr-Proton Porsche 997 GT3-RSR in the pit garage at the 2007 24 Hours of Le Mans

2007 was the year that the team progressed into the Le Mans Series. They competed with three cars in the 2007 season in the GT2 class; No. 77 was a Porsche 997 GT3-RSR driven by Marc Lieb and Xavier Pompidou, No. 79 a 996 GT3-RSR driven by Gerold Ried, Horst Felbermayr Sr. and Philip Collin, and No. 88 a 997 GT3-RSR driven by Christian Ried and Horst Felbermayr Jr. accompanied by a third driver in some races which included Thomas Grüber, Marc Basseng and Johannes Stuck.

The best of these trio of cars was No. 77 which took second place in the Teams Championship only three points behind winners Virgo Motorsport. The driver pairing of Lieb and Pompidou also took second in the Drivers Championship, 9 points behind Rob Bell of Virgo Motorsport and JMB Racing. Car 77 won three of the six races in the season. Car No. 88 only managed to pick up seven points finishing eleventh in the Teams Championship level on points with JMB Racing. Car No. 79 did not pick up any points.

The team also contested selected rounds in the FIA GT Championship that year finishing with only one points scoring race which was eight points at the Bucharest 2 Hours with cars No. 66 and 69 finishing second and seventh respectively.

2007 was also the year that the team made their début at the 24 Hours of Le Mans. The team contested the 75th running of the famous event partnering Seikel Motorsport. The father and son partnership of Horst Felbermayr Jr. and Sr. alongside Philip Collin were the drivers in car No. 71. Qualifying didn't go well with the car qualifying in 52nd position out of 54 cars. The race didn't last long either with the car retiring after 68 laps due to a problem with the electrics.

=== 2008 ===
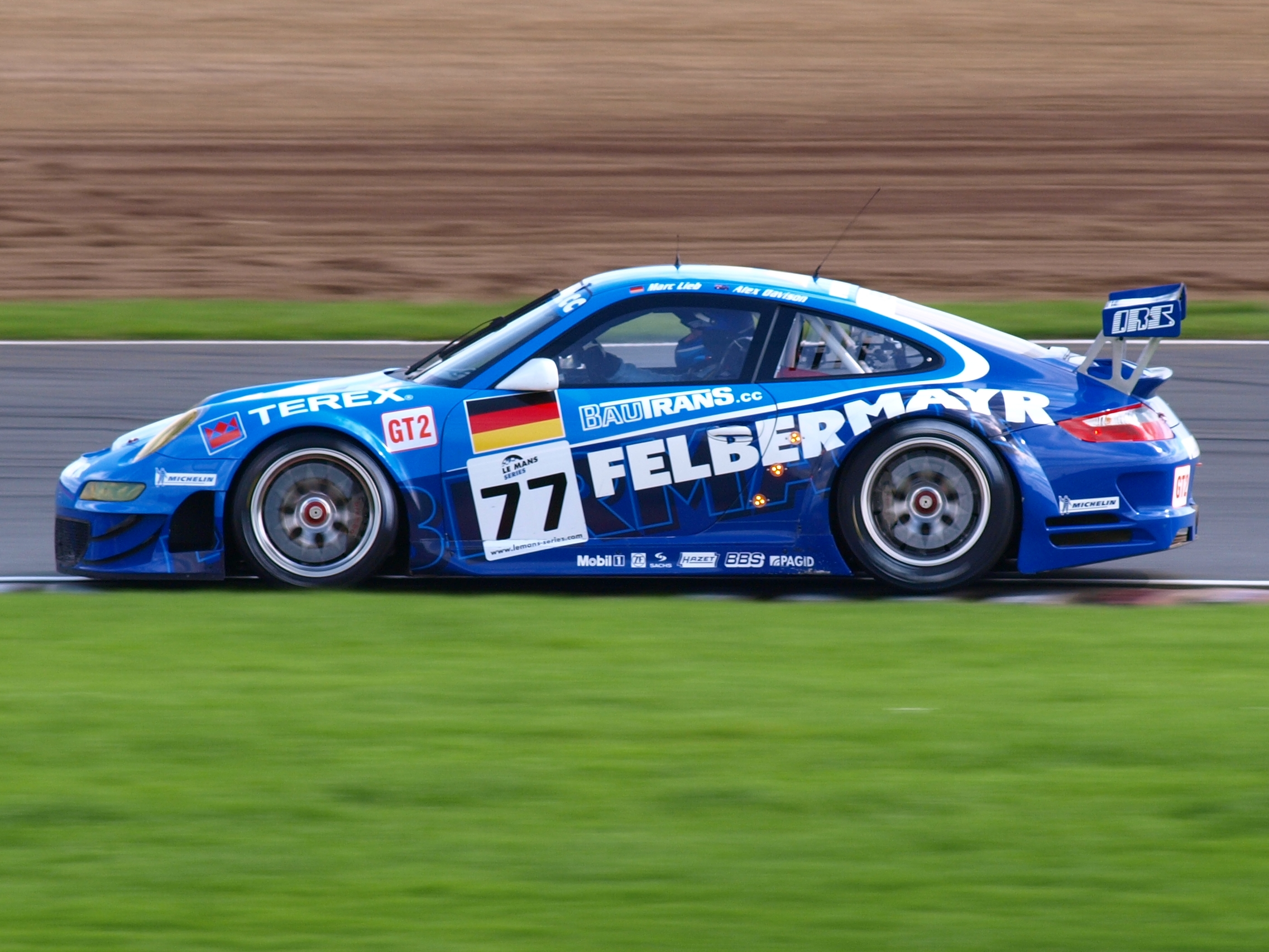
Team Felbermayr-Proton Porsche 997 GT3-RSR at the 2008 1000km of Silverstone

Team Felbermayr-Proton's 2008 campaign was similar to 2007's. They would compete every round of the Le Mans Series, selected round in the FIA GT Championship and compete at the Le Mans 24 Hours. The team raced two cars in the LMS rather than three in 2007 with Marc Lieb joined by Alex Davison in car No. 77 while car No. 88 was piloted by the two Horst Felbermayrs and Christian Ried. Despite not winning any races, car 77 finished second in the Teams Championship finishing once again behind Virgo Motorsport with a gap of 5 points this time round. Car 88 finished eighth place with ten points, level with Farnbacher Racing.

The team only competed one round in FIA GT which was the FIA GT Bucharest 2 Hours. The team scored no points in either of the two races that weekend.

The team made its full début at Le Mans with no partnership from Seikel Motorsport this time round. The teams' line up for Le Mans was Horst Felbermayr Sr., Alex Davison and Wolf Henzler. Qualifying went well with car 77 qualifying in second place in the GT2 class behind 2007 class winners IMSA Performance Matmut. They were not able to retain their second place qualifying position during the race but finished a respectable fifth place in class and 27th overall.

=== 2009 ===
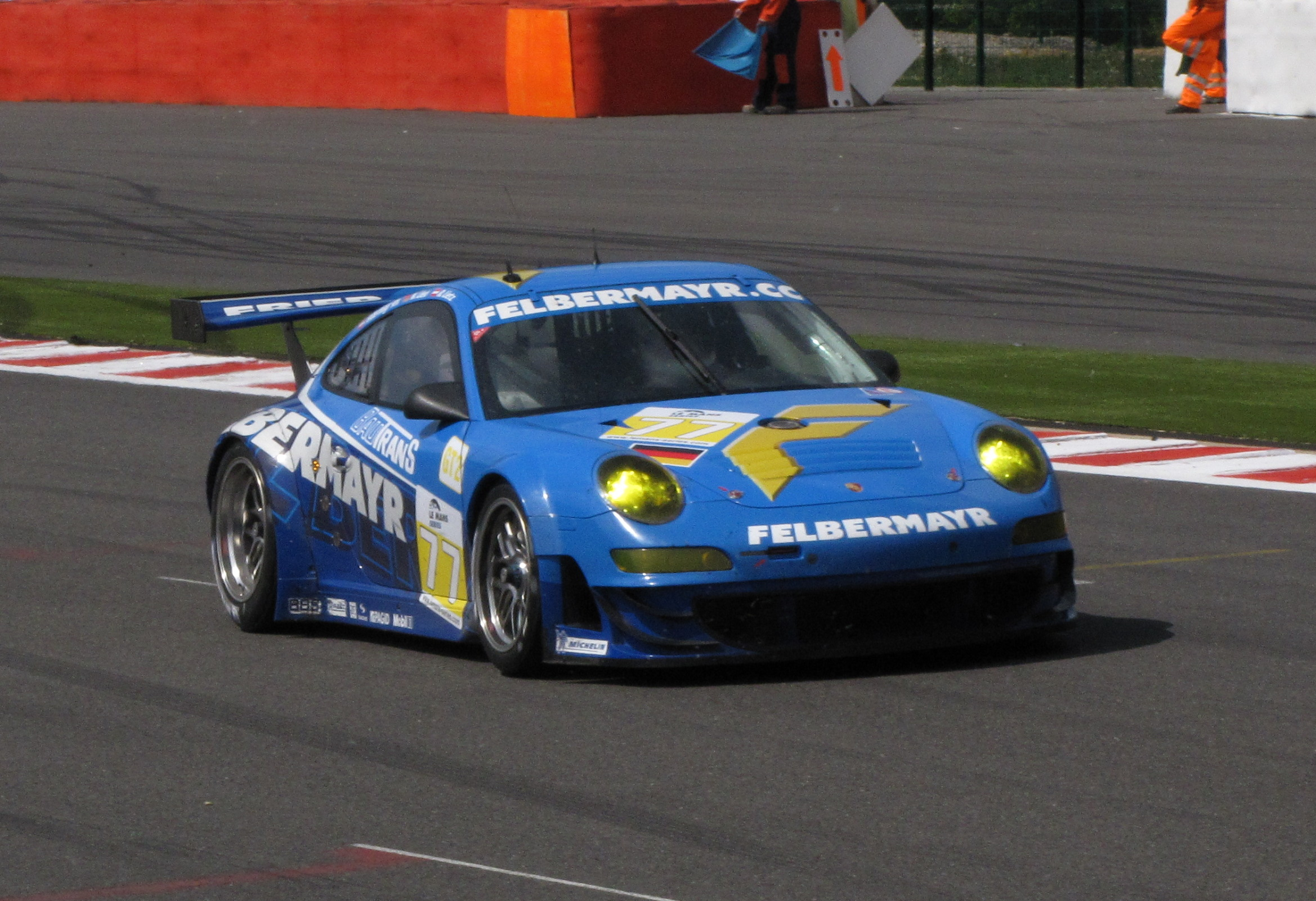
Team Felbermayr-Proton Porsche 997 GT3-RSR at the 2009 1000 km of Spa

The 2009 season was Felbermayr-Proton's most successful season to date. Marc Lieb remained in car 77 for the 2009 season with Richard Lietz becoming his teammate replacing Alex Davison. Horst Felbermayr Jr. and Christian Ried remained in car 88 with Felbermayr Sr. replaced by Francisco Cruz Martins. It was car 77 that earned all of the success for the team winning three of the five races and winning the Teams Championship by just one point ahead of JMW Motorsport, with car 88 finishing tenth in the standings earning five points. The pair drivers of Lieb and Lietz also won the Drivers Championship beating JMW drivers Rob Bell and Gianmaria Bruni by a point. The team entered the 2009 24 Hours of Le Mans with essentially two cars with No. 77 driven by LMS regulars Lieb and Lietz, who were joined by Wolf Henzler. They also partnered IMSA Performance Matmut who are long time Porsche competitors with car No. 70 with the two Felbermayrs racing alongside Matmut driver Michel Lecourt. The team were pretty confident going into the race after qualifying where they repeated their 2008 qualifying position of second in the GT2 class. The team narrowly missed out on pole position by only 0.030 seconds behind American Porsche competitors Flying Lizard Motorsports. Unfortunately their race came to a very early end after just 24 laps when car 77 ran out of fuel. The IMSA/Felbermayr car 70 soon followed by retiring on the 102nd lap. Felbermayr-Proton wrapped up their season when they contested the inaugural round of the Asian Le Mans Series and indeed the only round of the season in Asia. The race was at Okayama in Japan and the team brought over the two cars but mixed the driver pairings up a bit. All four drivers were German. Marc Lieb was joined by Le Mans teammate Wolf Henzler in No. 77 and Christian Ried was joined in No. 88 by Marco Holzer. Both cars finished second and fourth in class respectively.

=== 2010 ===
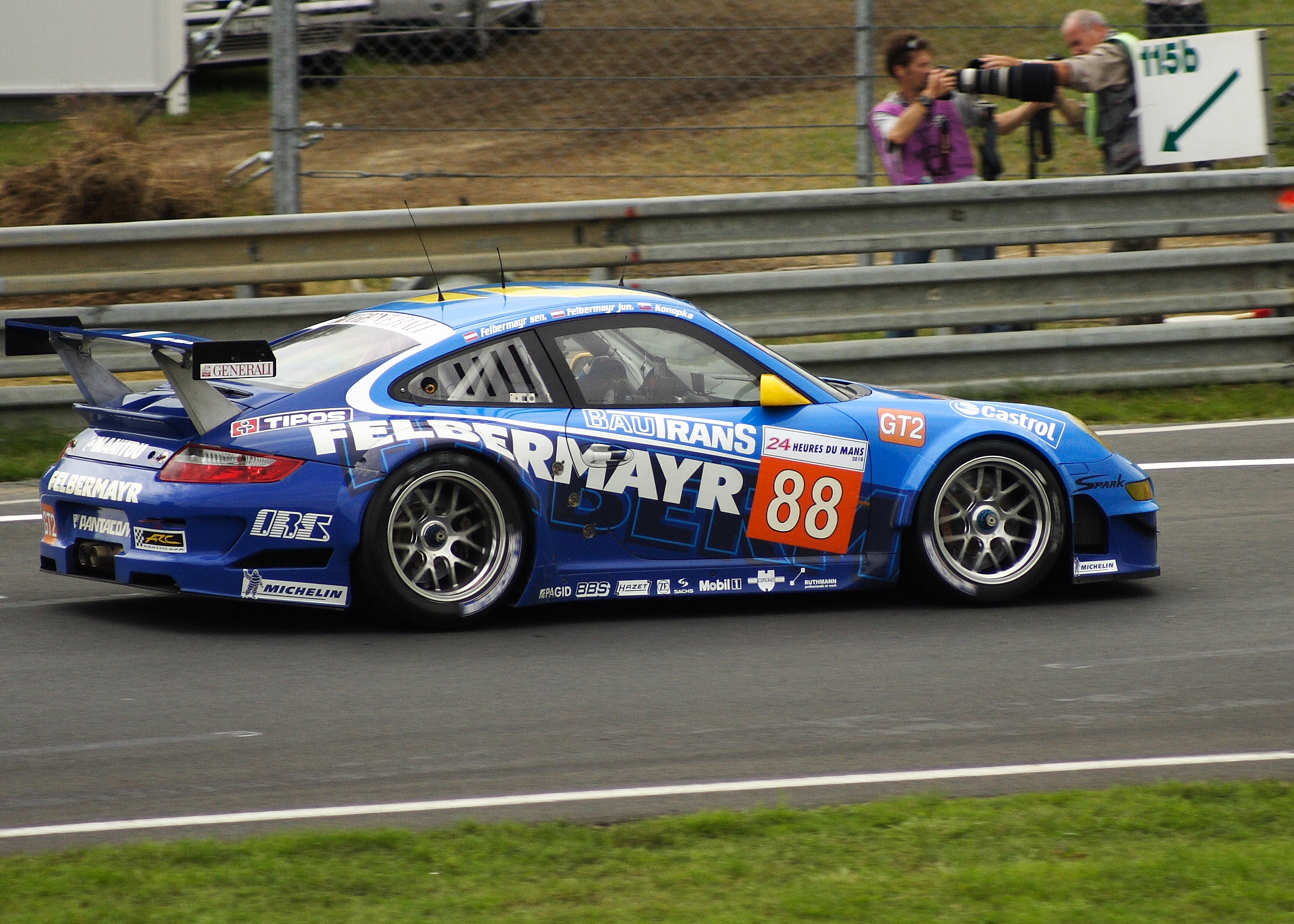
Car No. 88 Porsche 997 GT3-RSR at the 2010 24 Hours of Le Mans

The team hoped to continue their 2009 success in 2010. The team retained their No. 77 championship winning line up of Lieb and Lietz for the 2010 season with Christian Ried retaining his No. 88 seat alongside Martin Ragginger for the season. Porsche factory drivers Patrick Long and Romain Dumas also joined car 88 for a few of the LMS events. Car 77 once again was the force to be reckoned with winning three of the five races and once again winning the Teams Championship. They finished a comfortable 21 points ahead of second place team AF Corse. Car 88 was a lot more competitive than in previous years finishing fourth in the standings. Lieb and Lietz also retained their Drivers Championship titles beating the AF Corse trio of Jean Alesi, Giancarlo Fisichella and Toni Vilander by 21 points.

2010 was the inaugural season of the Intercontinental Le Mans Cup, a global endurance racing series that mixes in with events like the Le Mans Series and the American Le Mans Series. It is the first of its kind since the World Sportscar Championship last run in 1992. The 2010 edition was a sort of prologue to a proper season with three events with one event in Europe, America and Asia. Felbermayr-Proton took part in the European and Asian rounds at Silverstone and Zhuhai. The team won the championship with 72 points, 15 points ahead of LMS rivals AF Corse. As it was a series for teams and manufacturers, a drivers championship was not awarded.

For the 2010 24 Hours of Le Mans, the team hoped that their championship winning car could prove its status this time round after a disappointing early exit in last years edition. The previous year's car 77 trio of Lieb, Lietz and Henzler remained while car 88 saw the father/son duo of the Felbermayrs return being joined by Slovakian racer Miro Konopka. Qualifying went reasonably well for No. 77 qualifying fourth in class while No. 88 started second last. The race however was a completely different story with car 77 taking the GT2 class victory at Le Mans in 2010 beating Ferrari, Corvette and fellow Porsche factory teams. It was Marc Lieb's second class victory, winning the 2005 24 Hours of Le Mans in the GT2 category with Alex Job Racing. Richard Lietz also won his second class victory in 2010 after winning the GT2 class in his first Le Mans race in 2007 with IMSA Performance Matmut. It was Wolf Henzler's first class victory at Le Mans. Car 88 did reasonably well finishing eighth in a highly competitive GT2 class.

=== 2011 ===
The 2011 Le Mans Series season saw the GT2 class split to two classes LM GTE Pro and LM GTE Am. GTE Pro was for teams using 2011 spec cars or older and were allowed have a fully professional (gold and platinum) driver line up. GTE Am was for teams with 2010 spec cars or older and could only have one professional or gold category driver in the line up. The team raced with two cars with once in each class. Car 77 was a 2011 spec Porsche 997 GT3-RSR in LM GTE Pro driven by champions Lieb and Lietz. Car 88 was an older spec GT3-RSR competing in the LM GTE Am class and was driven by Horst Felbermayr Jr. and Christian Ried with appearances from Felbermayr Sr. and Bryce Miller in some of the rounds. In GTE Pro, the team finished third in the Teams Championship, sadly not earning three championships in a row. The GTE Am Porsche also finished third in the championship out of four competitors and picked up a win in the opening round at Paul Ricard.

The team competed in that year's ILMC but only in the GTE Am class and restoring the old Proton Competition name of yesteryear. The car used was No. 63 and had many different driver combinations throughout the seven-round season with Christian Ried racing in all but one of the events. Proton finished third in the championship with 52 points.

The team went into the 2011 24 Hours of Le Mans in two classes as well as being the reigning GT2 Le Mans winners. They kept the Lieb/Lietz/Henzler alliance that won Le Mans in 2010 for their No. 77 GTE Pro car while the GTE Am car No. 63 was driven by team boss Christian Ried and the two Felbermayrs. Proton also operated an extra 911 GT3-RSR No. 88 in the Pro class, driven by Nick Tandy, Abdulaziz al-Faisal and Bryce Miller. The two Pro cars qualified in the middle of the pack while the Am car qualified second fastest in class. Out of the three cars, No. 77 was the only one that finished which was fourth in class. Car No. 63's race came to an end near dawn on the 199th lap when the No. 74 Corvette Racing car in GTE Pro went to lap the Proton Competition car driven by Felbermayr Sr. at the time. Corvette driver Jan Magnussen who was leading in the Pro class at the time, tried to lap the Porsche on the inside of the final part of the Porsche Curves rather than around the outside. The Corvette C6.R went onto the grass and spun hitting the driver's side of the Porsche head on injuring Felbermayr Sr., who was the oldest driver competing at Le Mans in 2011. Car No. 88 retired thirty laps previously.

=== 2012 ===
Proton Competition announced plans to campaign in the inaugural season of the FIA World Endurance Championship in 2012 with two cars in GTE Pro and GTE Am. Marc Lieb and Richard Lietz would be the regular season pair in the GTE Pro car while Christian Ried and Gianluca Roda were scheduled to compete in the GTE Am Porsche.

=== 2015 ===
Proton Competition teamed with Dempsey Racing at the 2015 24 Hours of Le Mans. The team qualified 5th and finished 2nd in the LM GTE-AM class with drivers Marco Seefried, Patrick Long, and Patrick Dempsey driving the number 77 Dempsey/Proton Racing Porsche 911 RSR.

== Racing record ==
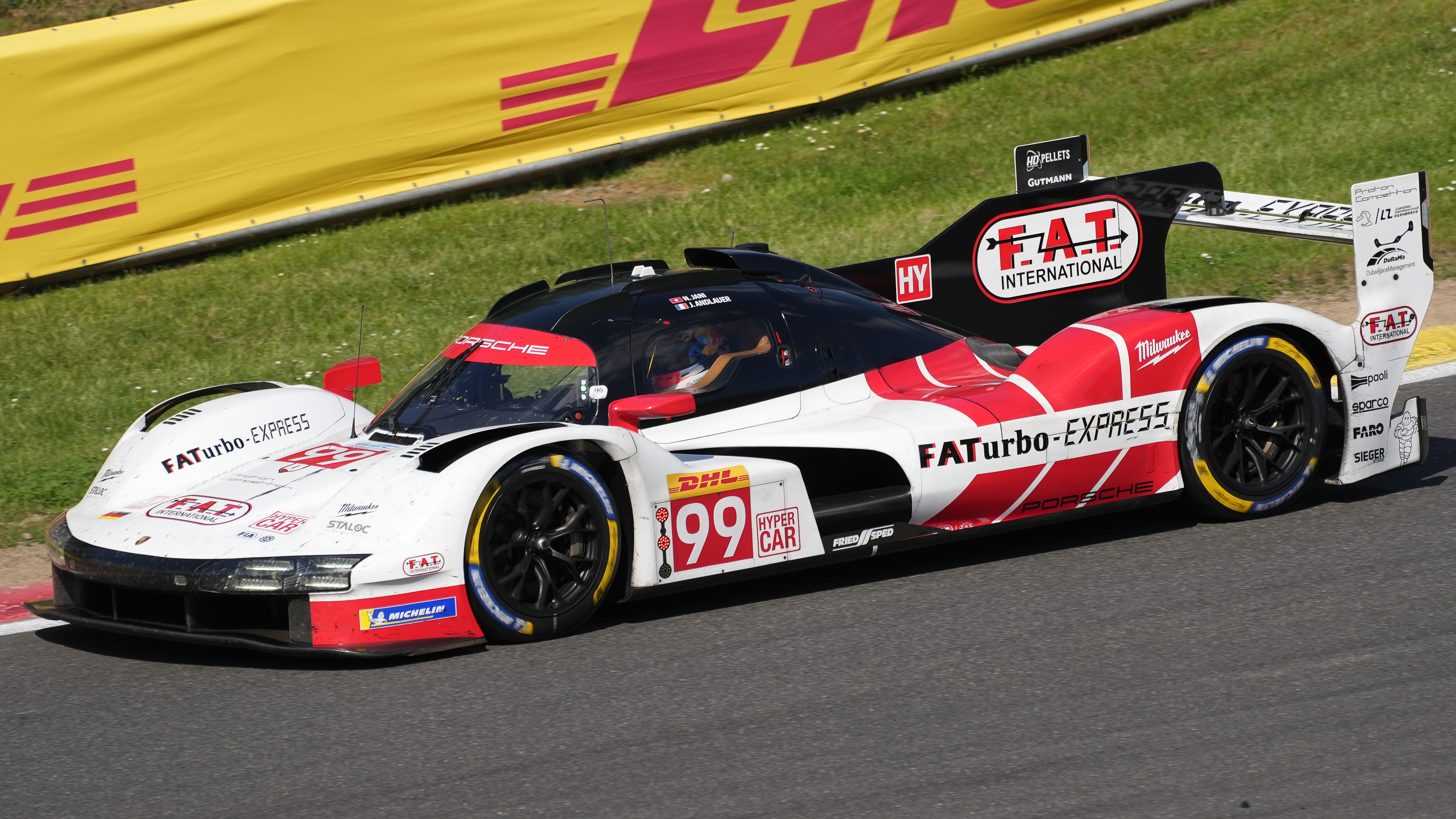
Proton Competition's Porsche 963 at the 2024 6 Hours of Spa-Francorchamps

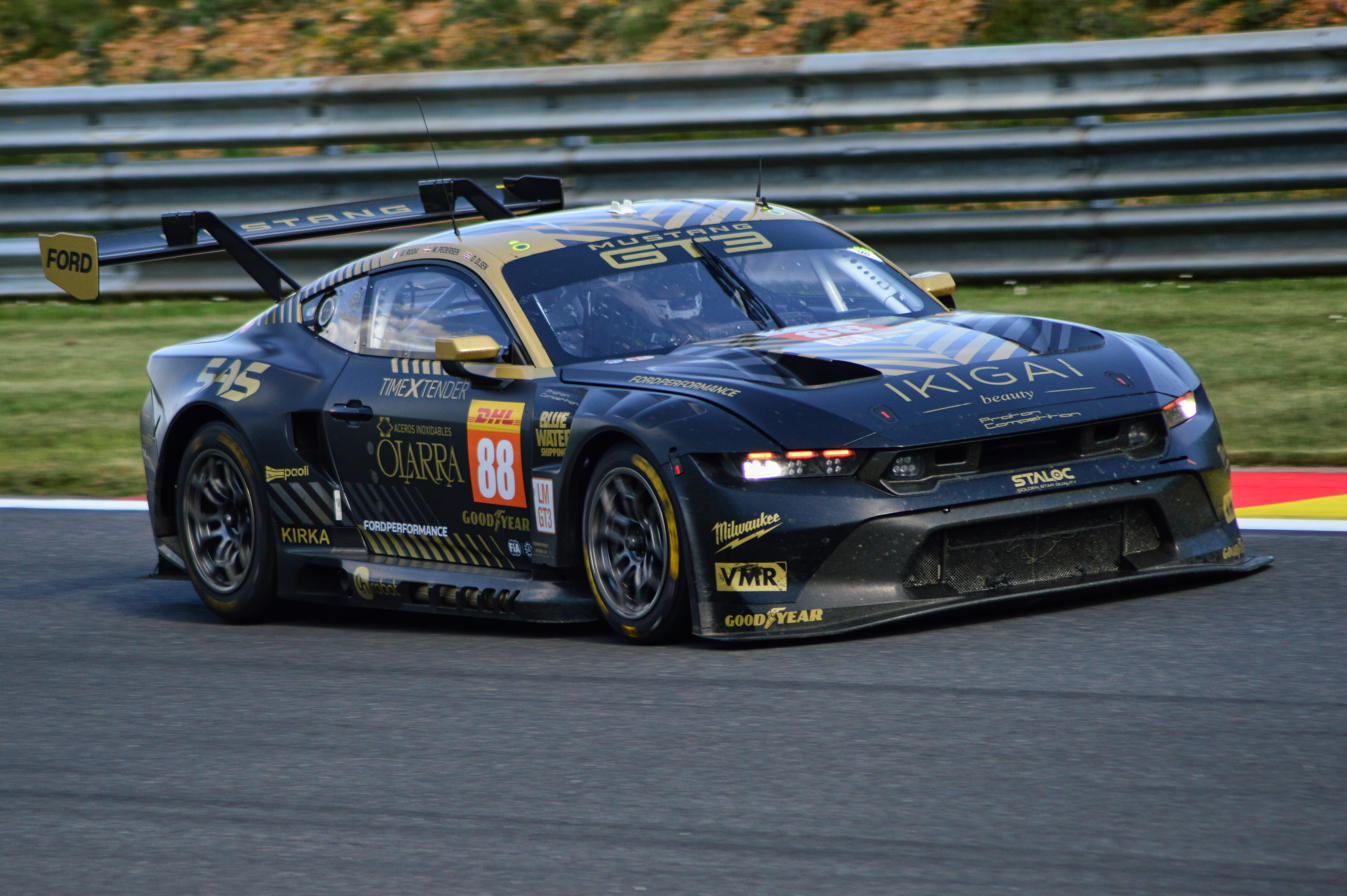
Proton Competition's Ford Mustang GT3 at the 2024 6 Hours of Spa-Francorchamps

=== 24 Hours of Le Mans results ===
Year	Entrant	No.	Car	Drivers	Class	Laps	Pos.	Class Pos.
2008	(Germany) Team Felbermayr-Proton	77	Porsche 997 GT3-RSR	(Australia) Alex Davison (Austria) Horst Felbermayr (Germany) Wolf Henzler	LMGT2	309	27th	5th
2009	(France) IMSA Performance Matmut (Germany) Team Felbermayr-Proton	70	Porsche 997 GT3-RSR	(Austria) Horst Felbermayr (Austria) Horst Felbermayr Jr. (France) Michel Lecourt	LMGT2	102	DNF	DNF
2009	(Germany) Team Felbermayr-Proton	77	Porsche 997 GT3-RSR	(Germany) Wolf Henzler (Germany) Marc Lieb (Austria) Richard Lietz	LMGT2	24	DNF	DNF
2010	(Germany) Team Felbermayr-Proton	77	Porsche 997 GT3-RSR	(Germany) Wolf Henzler (Germany) Marc Lieb (Austria) Richard Lietz	LMGT2	338	11th	1st
2010	(Germany) Team Felbermayr-Proton	88	Porsche 997 GT3-RSR	(Austria) Horst Felbermayr (Austria) Horst Felbermayr Jr. (Slovakia) Miro Konôpka	LMGT2	304	24th	8th
2011	(Germany) Team Felbermayr-Proton	77	Porsche 997 GT3-RSR	(Germany) Wolf Henzler (Germany) Marc Lieb (Austria) Richard Lietz	LMGTE Pro	312	16th	4th
2011	(Germany) Team Felbermayr-Proton	88	Porsche 997 GT3-RSR	(Saudi Arabia) Abdulaziz Al Faisal (United States) Bryce Miller (United Kingdom) Nick Tandy	LMGTE Pro	169	DNF	DNF
2011	(Germany) Proton Competition	63	Porsche 997 GT3-RSR	(Austria) Horst Felbermayr (Austria) Horst Felbermayr Jr. (Germany) Christian Ried	LMGTE Am	199	DNF	DNF
2012	(Germany) Team Felbermayr-Proton	77	Porsche 997 GT3-RSR	(Germany) Wolf Henzler (Germany) Marc Lieb (Austria) Richard Lietz	LMGTE Pro	185	DNF	DNF
2012	(Germany) Team Felbermayr-Proton	88	Porsche 997 GT3-RSR	(Germany) Christian Ried (Italy) Gianluca Roda (Italy) Paolo Ruberti	LMGTE Am	222	DNF	DNF
2013	(United States) Dempsey Del Piero-Proton	77	Porsche 997 GT3-RSR	(United States) Patrick Dempsey (United States) Joe Foster (United States) Patrick Long	LMGTE Am	305	28th	4th
2013	(Germany) Proton Competition	88	Porsche 997 GT3-RSR	(Germany) Christian Ried (Italy) Gianluca Roda (Italy) Paolo Ruberti	LMGTE Am	300	35th	8th
2014	(United States) Dempsey Racing-Proton	77	Porsche 911 RSR	(United States) Patrick Dempsey (United States) Joe Foster (United States) Patrick Long	LMGTE Am	329	24th	5th
2014	(Germany) Proton Competition	88	Porsche 911 RSR	(United Arab Emirates) Khaled Al Qubaisi (Austria) Klaus Bachler (Germany) Christian Ried	LMGTE Am	332	21st	2nd
2015	(Germany) Dempsey-Proton Racing	77	Porsche 911 RSR	(United States) Patrick Dempsey (United States) Patrick Long (Germany) Marco Seefried	LMGTE Am	331	22nd	2nd
2015	(Germany) Abu Dhabi-Proton Racing	88	Porsche 911 RSR	(United Arab Emirates) Khaled Al Qubaisi (Austria) Klaus Bachler (Germany) Christian Ried	LMGTE Am	44	DNF	DNF
2016	(Germany) Dempsey-Proton Racing	77	Porsche 911 RSR	(Denmark) Michael Christensen (Austria) Philipp Eng (Austria) Richard Lietz	LMGTE Pro	329	31st	8th
2016	(United Arab Emirates) Abu Dhabi-Proton Racing	88	Porsche 911 RSR	(United Arab Emirates) Khaled Al Qubaisi (Denmark) David Heinemeier Hansson (United States) Patrick Long	LMGTE Am	330	28th	3rd
2016	(Germany) Proton Competition	89	Porsche 911 RSR	(United States) Leh Keen (United States) ~~Cooper MacNeil~~ (Note: Cooper MacNeil was not allowed to drive the No. 89 Proton Porsche after becoming ill before the race. A last minute switch to reserve driver Gunnar Jeannette was denied by the ACO. The entry was allowed by the ACO to compete with only two drivers.) (United States) Marc Miller	LMGTE Am	50	DNF	DNF
2016	(Hong Kong) KCMG	78	Porsche 911 RSR	(Switzerland) Joël Camathias (Germany) Wolf Henzler (Germany) Christian Ried	LMGTE Am	300	41st	10th
2017	(Germany) Dempsey-Proton Racing	77	Porsche 911 RSR	(Italy) Matteo Cairoli (Germany) Marvin Dienst (Germany) Christian Ried	LMGTE Am	329	34th	6th
2017	(Germany) Proton Competition	88	Porsche 911 RSR	(United Arab Emirates) Khaled Al Qubaisi (Austria) Klaus Bachler (Belgium) Stéphane Lémeret	LMGTE Am	18	DNF	DNF
2017	(Germany) Proton Competition	93	Porsche 911 RSR	(Saudi Arabia) Abdulaziz Al Faisal (United States) Mike Hedlund (United States) Patrick Long	LMGTE Am	329	37th	9th
2018	(Germany) Dempsey-Proton Racing	77	Porsche 911 RSR	(France) Julien Andlauer (Australia) Matt Campbell (Germany) Christian Ried	LMGTE Am	335	25th	1st
2018	(Germany) Dempsey-Proton Racing	88	Porsche 911 RSR	(United Arab Emirates) Khaled Al Qubaisi (Italy) Matteo Cairoli (Italy) Giorgio Roda	LMGTE Am	225	DNF	DNF
2018	(Germany) Proton Competition	99	Porsche 911 RSR	(United States) Patrick Long (United States) Tim Pappas (United States) Spencer Pumpelly	LMGTE Am	334	29th	4th
2018	(Italy) Ebimotors	80	Porsche 911 RSR	(Italy) Fabio Babini (France) Erik Maris (Denmark) Christina Nielsen	LMGTE Am	332	31st	6th
2019	(Germany) Dempsey-Proton Racing	77	Porsche 911 RSR	(France) Julien Andlauer (Australia) Matt Campbell (Germany) Christian Ried	LMGTE Am	332	34th	4th
2019	(Germany) Dempsey-Proton Racing	88	Porsche 911 RSR	(Italy) Matteo Cairoli (Japan) Satoshi Hoshino (Italy) Giorgio Roda	LMGTE Am	79	DNF	DNF
2019	(Germany) Dempsey-Proton Racing	99	Porsche 911 RSR	(Sweden) Niclas Jönsson (United States) Tracy Krohn (United States) Patrick Long	LMGTE Am	0	WD	WD
2019	(Germany) Proton Competition	78	Porsche 911 RSR	(Monaco) Vincent Abril (Monaco) Louis Prette (Monaco) Philippe Prette	LMGTE Am	332	36th	6th
2020	(Germany) Dempsey-Proton Racing	77	Porsche 911 RSR	(Australia) Matt Campbell (Italy) Riccardo Pera (Germany) Christian Ried	LMGTE Am	339	25th	2nd
2020	(Germany) Dempsey-Proton Racing	88	Porsche 911 RSR	(United States) Dominique Bastien (Belgium) Adrien de Leener (Austria) Thomas Preining	LMGTE Am	238	NC	NC
2020	(Germany) Dempsey-Proton Racing	99	Porsche 911 RSR	(France) Julien Andlauer (Thailand) Vutthikorn Inthraphuvasak (Switzerland) Lucas Légeret	LMGTE Am	331	36th	10th
2020	(Germany) Proton Competition	78	Porsche 911 RSR	(Italy) Michele Beretta (Austria) Horst Felbermayr Jr. (Netherlands) Max van Splunteren	LMGTE Am	330	38th	12th
2021	(United States) WeatherTech Racing	79	Porsche 911 RSR-19	(New Zealand) Earl Bamber (United States) Cooper MacNeil (Belgium) Laurens Vanthoor	LMGTE Pro	139	DNF	DNF
2021	(Germany) Dempsey-Proton Racing	77	Porsche 911 RSR-19	(Australia) Matt Campbell (New Zealand) Jaxon Evans (Germany) Christian Ried	LMGTE Am	335	31st	5th
2021	(Germany) Dempsey-Proton Racing	88	Porsche 911 RSR-19	(France) Julien Andlauer (Germany) Lance David Arnold (United States) Dominique Bastien	LMGTE Am	327	42nd	13th
2021	(Germany) Proton Competition	99	Porsche 911 RSR-19	(Thailand) Vutthikorn Inthraphuvasak (France) Florian Latorre (United Kingdom) Harry Tincknell	LMGTE Am	66	DNF	DNF
2021	(Germany) Absolute Racing	18	Porsche 911 RSR-19	(Indonesia) Andrew Haryanto (Belgium) Alessio Picariello (Germany) Marco Seefried	LMGTE Am	332	34th	7th
2022	(Germany) Dempsey-Proton Racing	77	Porsche 911 RSR-19	(United Kingdom) Sebastian Priaulx (Germany) Christian Ried (United Kingdom) Harry Tincknell	LMGTE Am	336	47th	14th
2022	(Germany) Dempsey-Proton Racing	88	Porsche 911 RSR-19	(Belgium) Jan Heylen (United States) Fred Poordad (United States) Maxwell Root	LMGTE Am	340	38th	5th
2022	(Germany) Proton Competition	93	Porsche 911 RSR-19	(Australia) Matt Campbell (Republic of Ireland) Michael Fassbender (Canada) Zacharie Robichon	LMGTE Am	329	51st	16th
2022	(United States) WeatherTech Racing	79	Porsche 911 RSR-19	(France) Julien Andlauer (United States) Cooper MacNeil (United States) Thomas Merrill	LMGTE Am	343	35th	2nd
2022	(United States) Hardpoint Motorsport (Note: Rob Ferriol, owner/driver of Hardpoint Motorsport who had received an automatic invitation via IMSA, withdrew his LMGTE Am-category Porsche 911 RSR-19 and relinquished the entry to Proton Competition. Proton gave it to the Absolute Racing customer squad, which raced under the Hardpoint Motorsport name in accordance with ACO regulations.)	99	Porsche 911 RSR-19	(Indonesia) Andrew Haryanto (Belgium) Alessio Picariello (Estonia) Martin Rump	LMGTE Am	338	44th	11th
2023	(Germany) Proton Competition	16	Porsche 911 RSR-19	(United States) Ryan Hardwick (Belgium) Jan Heylen (Canada) Zacharie Robichon	LMGTE Am	28	DNF	DNF
2023	(Germany) Proton Competition	88	Porsche 911 RSR-19	(Germany) Jonas Ried (United Kingdom) Harry Tincknell (United States) Don Yount	LMGTE Am	170	DNF	DNF
2023	(Germany) Proton Competition	911	Porsche 911 RSR-19	(Republic of Ireland) Michael Fassbender (Austria) Richard Lietz (Estonia) Martin Rump	LMGTE Am	246	DNF	DNF
2023	(Germany) Dempsey-Proton Racing	77	Porsche 911 RSR-19	(France) Julien Andlauer (Denmark) Mikkel O. Pedersen (Germany) Christian Ried	LMGTE Am	118	DNF	DNF
2023	(Italy) Iron Lynx	60	Porsche 911 RSR-19	(Italy) Matteo Cressoni (Belgium) Alessio Picariello (Italy) Claudio Schiavoni	LMGTE Am	28	DNF	DNF
2023	(Italy) Iron Dames	85	Porsche 911 RSR-19	(Belgium) Sarah Bovy (Switzerland) Rahel Frey (Denmark) Michelle Gatting	LMGTE Am	312	30th	4th
2024	(Germany) Proton Competition	99	Porsche 963	(France) Julien Andlauer (Switzerland) Neel Jani (United Kingdom) Harry Tincknell	Hypercar	251	45th	16th
2024	(Germany) Proton Competition	9	Oreca 07-Gibson	(France) Macéo Capietto (Germany) Jonas Ried (Netherlands) Bent Viscaal	LMP2	86	DNF	DNF
2024	(Germany) Proton Competition	44	Ford Mustang GT3	(United Kingdom) John Hartshorne (Germany) Christopher Mies (United Kingdom) Ben Tuck	LMGT3	280	31st	4th
2024	(Germany) Proton Competition	77	Ford Mustang GT3	(United Kingdom) Ben Barker (United States) Ryan Hardwick (Canada) Zacharie Robichon	LMGT3	227	46th	17th
2024	(Germany) Proton Competition	88	Ford Mustang GT3	(Norway) Dennis Olsen (Denmark) Mikkel O. Pedersen (Italy) Giorgio Roda	LMGT3	280	30th	3rd
2025	(Germany) Proton Competition	99	Porsche 963	(Switzerland) Neel Jani (Chile) Nico Pino (Argentina) Nicolás Varrone	Hypercar	383	13th	13th
2025	(Germany) Iron Lynx – Proton	9	Oreca 07-Gibson	(France) Macéo Capietto (France) Reshad de Gerus (Germany) Jonas Ried	LMP2	365	21st	4th
2025	(Germany) Proton Competition	11	Oreca 07-Gibson	(Austria) René Binder (Italy) Giorgio Roda (Netherlands) Bent Viscaal	LMP2 (Pro-Am)	365	23rd	3rd
2025	(Germany) Proton Competition	77	Ford Mustang GT3	(United Kingdom) Ben Barker (Portugal) Bernardo Sousa (United Kingdom) Ben Tuck	LMGT3	338	41st	9th
2025	(Germany) Proton Competition	88	Ford Mustang GT3	(Italy) Stefano Gattuso (Italy) Giammarco Levorato (Norway) Dennis Olsen	LMGT3	46	DNF	DNF
2026	(Germany) Proton Competition	9	Oreca 07-Gibson	(United Kingdom) Harry King (Japan) Kakunoshin Ohta (Germany) Jonas Ried	LMP2	356	25th	11th
2026	(Germany) Proton Competition	44	Oreca 07-Gibson	(Austria) Horst Felbermayr Jr. (Austria) Horst Felix Felbermayr (Spain) Lorenzo Fluxá	LMP2 (Pro-Am)	354	28th	6th
2026	(Germany) Proton Competition	77	Ford Mustang GT3 Evo	(United States) Eric Powell (United Kingdom) Sebastian Priaulx (United Kingdom) Ben Tuck	LMGT3	244	DNF	DNF
2026	(Germany) Proton Competition	88	Ford Mustang GT3 Evo	(Italy) Stefano Gattuso (Italy) Giammarco Levorato (United States) Logan Sargeant	LMGT3	323	49th	17th

=== Complete FIA World Endurance Championship results ===
Year	Entrant	Class	No	Chassis	Engine	Drivers	Rounds									Pos.	Pts
Year	Entrant	Class	No	Chassis	Engine	Drivers	1	2	3	4	5	6	7	8	9	Pos.	Pts
2012							SEB	SPA	LMS	SIL	SAO	BHR	FUJ	SHA			
2012	(Germany) Team Felbermayr-Proton	LMGTE Pro	77	Porsche 997 GT3-RSR	Porsche 4.0 L Flat-6	(Germany) Marc Lieb (Austria) Richard Lietz (France) Patrick Pilet (Germany) Wolf Henzler	2	1	Ret	4	3	3	1	2		3rd	133
2012	(Germany) Team Felbermayr-Proton	LMGTE Am	88	Porsche 997 GT3-RSR	Porsche 4.0 L Flat-6	(Germany) Christian Ried (Italy) Gianluca Roda (Italy) Paolo Ruberti	1	2	Ret	2	1	1	3	2		2nd	153
2013							SIL	SPA	LMS	SÃO	COA	FUJ	SHA	BHR			
2013	(Germany) Proton Competition	LMGTE Am	88	Porsche 997 GT3-RSR	Porsche 4.0 L Flat-6	(Germany) Christian Ried (Italy) Gianluca Roda (Italy) Paolo Ruberti	5	5	8	3	5	3	4	Ret		6th	84.5
2014							SIL	SPA	LMS	COA	FUJ	SHA	BHR	SÃO			
2014	(Germany) Proton Competition	LMGTE Am	88	Porsche 911 RSR	Porsche 4.0 L Flat-6	(Germany) Christian Ried (United Arab Emirates) Khaled Al Qubaisi (Austria) Klaus Bachler (Germany) Wolf Henzler	4	4	2	3	4	5	4	4		3rd	121
2015							SIL	SPA	LMS	NÜR	COA	FUJ	SHA	BHR			
2015	(Germany) Dempsey Racing-Proton	LMGTE Am	77	Porsche 911 RSR	Porsche 4.0 L Flat-6	(Germany) Marco Seefried (United States) Patrick Long (United States) Patrick Dempsey (Germany) Christian Ried	6	5	2	4	4	1	4	3		4th	131
2015	(Germany) Abu Dhabi-Proton Racing	LMGTE Am	88	Porsche 911 RSR	Porsche 4.0 L Flat-6	(United Arab Emirates) Khaled Al Qubaisi (Germany) Christian Ried (Austria) Klaus Bachler (New Zealand) Earl Bamber (Italy) Marco Mapelli	5	4	Ret	6	2	5	7	2		5th	82
2016							SIL	SPA	LMN	NÜR	MEX	COA	FUJ	SHA	BHR		
2016	(Germany) Dempsey-Proton Racing	LMGTE Pro	77	Porsche 911 RSR	Porsche 4.0 L Flat-6	(Austria) Richard Lietz (Denmark) Michael Christensen (Austria) Philipp Eng	6	4	8	6	6	6	7	6	7	7th	88
2016	(United Arab Emirates) Abu Dhabi-Proton Racing	LMGTE Am	88	Porsche 911 RSR	Porsche 4.0 L Flat-6	(United Arab Emirates) Khaled Al Qubaisi (Denmark) David Heinemeier Hansson (Austria) Klaus Bachler (United States) Patrick Long (France) Kévin Estre	5	6	3	4	1	5	5	4	1	2nd	151
2017							SIL	SPA	LMS	NÜR	MEX	COA	FUJ	SHA	BHR		
2017	(Germany) Dempsey-Proton Racing	LMGTE Am	77	Porsche 911 RSR	Porsche 4.0 L Flat-6	(Germany) Christian Ried (Germany) Marvin Dienst (Italy) Matteo Cairoli	3	2	6	1	1	4	3	3	4	3rd	174
2018-19							SPA	LMS	SIL	FUJ	SHA	SEB	SPA	LMS			
2018-19	(Germany) Dempsey-Proton Racing	LMGTE Am	77	Porsche 911 RSR	Porsche 4.0 L Flat-6	(Australia) Matt Campbell (Germany) Christian Ried (France) Julien Andlauer (Italy) Riccardo Pera	4	1	1	DSQ	1	1	1	4		2nd	110
2018-19	(Germany) Dempsey-Proton Racing	LMGTE Am	88	Porsche 911 RSR	Porsche 4.0 L Flat-6	(Italy) Matteo Cairoli (Italy) Giorgio Roda (United Arab Emirates) Khaled Al Qubaisi (Italy) Gianluca Roda (Japan) Satoshi Hoshino (Italy) Riccardo Pera	6	Ret	8	DSQ	3	7	9	Ret		9th	26
2019-20							SIL	FUJ	SHA	BHR	COA	SPA	LMN	BHR			
2019-20	(Germany) Dempsey-Proton Racing	LMGTE Am	77	Porsche 911 RSR	Porsche 4.0 L Flat-6	(Italy) Riccardo Pera (Germany) Christian Ried (Australia) Matt Campbell (Norway) Dennis Olsen	5	5	11	6	5	2	2	7		4th	107.5
2019-20	(Germany) Dempsey-Proton Racing	LMGTE Am	88	Porsche 911 RSR	Porsche 4.0 L Flat-6	(Austria) Thomas Preining (Italy) Gianluca Giraudi (Mexico) Ricardo Sánchez (Japan) Satoshi Hoshino (Belgium) Adrien de Leener (New Zealand) Will Bamber (Italy) Angelo Negro (United Arab Emirates) Khaled Al Qubaisi (United States) Bret Curtis (Switzerland) Lucas Légeret (United States) Dominique Bastien (Germany) Marco Holzer (New Zealand) Jaxon Evans	11	9	6	Ret	9	5	NC	3		9th	45.5
2021							SPA	POR	MNZ	LMN	BHR	BHR					
2021	(Germany) Dempsey-Proton Racing	LMGTE Am	77	Porsche 911 RSR-19	Porsche 4.2 L Flat-6	(Australia) Matt Campbell (New Zealand) Jaxon Evans (Germany) Christian Ried	Ret	Ret	5	4	2	2				79	3rd
2021	(Germany) Dempsey-Proton Racing	LMGTE Am	88	Porsche 911 RSR-19	Porsche 4.2 L Flat-6	(Germany) Marco Seefried (Indonesia) Andrew Haryanto (Belgium) Alessio Picariello (France) Julien Andlauer (United States) Dominique Bastien (Germany) Lance Arnold (United Arab Emirates) Khaled Al Qubaisi (Belgium) Adrien De Leener (Zimbabwe) Axcil Jefferies	5	9	6	8	12	Ret				21	16th
2022							SEB	SPA	LMN	MON	FUJ	BAH					
2022	(Germany) Dempsey-Proton Racing	LMGTE Am	77	Porsche 911 RSR-19	Porsche 4.2 L Flat-6	(United Kingdom) Sebastian Priaulx (Germany) Christian Ried (United Kingdom) Harry Tincknell	4	1	14	1	Ret	8				83	6th
2022	(Germany) Dempsey-Proton Racing	LMGTE Am	88	Porsche 911 RSR-19	Porsche 4.2 L Flat-6	(United States) Fred Poordad (United States) Patrick Lindsey (France) Julien Andlauer (Belgium) Jan Heylen (United States) Maxwell Root	10	9	5	6	9	12				38	12th
2023							SEB	POR	SPA	LMN	MZA	FUJ	BHR				
2023	(Germany) Proton Competition	Hypercar	99	Porsche 963	Porsche 9RD 4.6 L Turbo V8	(Italy) Gianmaria Bruni (United Kingdom) Harry Tincknell (Switzerland) Neel Jani					Ret	9	10			20th	4
2023	(Germany) Dempsey-Proton Racing	LMGTE Am	77	Porsche 911 RSR-19	Porsche 4.2 L Flat-6	(France) Julien Andlauer (Germany) Christian Ried (Denmark) Mikkel O. Pedersen	2	7	9	Ret	1	6	6			4th	80
2023	(Germany) Proton Competition	LMGTE Am	88	Porsche 911 RSR-19	Porsche 4.2 L Flat-6	(United Kingdom) Harry Tincknell (United States) Ryan Hardwick (Canada) Zacharie Robichon (Germany) Jonas Ried (United States) Don Yount	SEB; WD	9	4	Ret						14th	14
2024							QAT	IMO	SPA	LMN	SAP	COA	FUJ	BHR			
2024	(Germany) Proton Competition	Hypercar	99	Porsche 963	Porsche 9RD 4.6 L Turbo V8	(France) Julien Andlauer (Switzerland) Neel Jani (United Kingdom) Harry Tincknell	9	Ret	5	14	15	11	11	12		15th	13
2024	(Germany) Proton Competition	LMGT3	77	Ford Mustang GT3	Ford Coyote 5.4 L V8	(United Kingdom) Ben Barker (United States) Ryan Hardwick (Canada) Zacharie Robichon	11	9	9	13	7	6	15	Ret		17th	8
2024	(Germany) Proton Competition	LMGT3	88	Ford Mustang GT3	Ford Coyote 5.4 L V8	(Norway) Dennis Olsen (Denmark) Mikkel O. Pedersen (Italy) Giorgio Roda (Germany) Christian Ried (United States) Ben Keating (Italy) Giammarco Levorato	9	Ret	8	3	13	NC	16	Ret		13th	37
2025*							QAT	ITA	SPA	LMS	SÃO	COA	FUJ	BHR			
2025*	(Germany) Proton Competition	Hypercar	99	Porsche 963	Porsche 9RD 4.6 L Turbo V8	(Switzerland) Neel Jani (Chile) Nico Pino (Argentina) Nicolás Varrone	15	14	Ret	12	10	13	12			2nd	135
2025*	(Germany) Proton Competition	LMGT3	77	Ford Mustang GT3	Ford Coyote 5.4 L V8	(United Kingdom) Ben Barker (Portugal) Bernardo Sousa (United Kingdom) Ben Tuck	Ret	10	4	7	Ret	6	12			13th	33
2025*	(Germany) Proton Competition	LMGT3	88	Ford Mustang GT3	Ford Coyote 5.4 L V8	(Italy) Stefano Gattuso (Italy) Giammarco Levorato (Norway) Dennis Olsen	10	16	2	Ret	Ret	8	NC			15th	25

* Championship ongoing.

=== Complete IMSA SportsCar Championship results ===
Year	Entrant	Class	No	Chassis	Engine	Drivers	Rounds													Pos.	Pts
Year	Entrant	Class	No	Chassis	Engine	Drivers	1	2	3	4	5	6	7	8	9	10	11	12	13	Pos.	Pts
2021							DAY		SEB	BEL	WGL1	WGL2	LIM	ELK	LGA	LBH	VIR	ATL			
2021							Q	R	SEB	BEL	WGL1	WGL2	LIM	ELK	LGA	LBH	VIR	ATL			
2021	(United States) WeatherTech Racing	GTLM	79	Porsche 911 RSR-19	Porsche 4.2 L Flat-6	(United States) Cooper MacNeil (France) Kévin Estre (Italy) Gianmaria Bruni (Austria) Richard Lietz (Australia) Matt Campbell (France) Mathieu Jaminet	3	6	1		Ret	3	3	1	3	3	3	1		3rd	3356
2021	(United States) WeatherTech Racing	GTLM	97	Porsche 911 RSR-19	Porsche 4.2 L Flat-6	(France) Frederic Makowiecki (France) Kévin Estre (Denmark) Michael Christensen												2		6th	348
2022							DAY		SEB	LBH	LGA	MOH	BEL	WGL	MOS	LIM	ELK	VIR	ATL		
2022							Q	R	SEB	LBH	LGA	MOH	BEL	WGL	MOS	LIM	ELK	VIR	ATL		
2022	(Germany) Proton USA	GTD Pro	15	Mercedes-AMG GT3 Evo	Mercedes-AMG M159 6.2 L V8	(Germany) Patrick Assenheimer (United States) Austin Cindric (Germany) Dirk Müller	3	5												12th	290
2022	(United States) WeatherTech Racing	GTD Pro	79	Porsche 911 GT3 R	Porsche M97/80 4.0 L Flat-6	(France) Julien Andlauer (United States) Cooper MacNeil (Belgium) Alessio Picariello (Italy) Matteo Cairoli	8	8	6											6th	1976
2022	(United States) WeatherTech Racing	GTD Pro	79	Mercedes-AMG GT3 Evo	Mercedes-AMG M159 6.2 L V8	(United States) Cooper MacNeil (Italy) Raffaele Marciello (Spain) Daniel Juncadella (Canada) Mikaël Grenier (Germany) Maro Engel (Germany) Maximilian Buhk (Germany) Maximilian Götz				4	6			5	4				6	6th	1976
2022	(United States) WeatherTech Racing	GTD Pro	97	Mercedes-AMG GT3 Evo	Mercedes-AMG M159 6.2 L V8	(Germany) Maro Engel (France) Jules Gounon (United States) Cooper MacNeil (Spain) Daniel Juncadella	9	Ret	3											9th	542
2022	(United States) WeatherTech Racing	GTD	79	Mercedes-AMG GT3 Evo	Mercedes-AMG M159 6.2 L V8	(United States) Cooper MacNeil (France) Jules Gounon (Spain) Daniel Juncadella										7	11	6		17th	756
2023							DAY	SEB	LBH	LGA	WGL	MOS	LIM	ELK	VIR	IMS	ATL				
2023	(Germany) Proton Competition	GTP	59	Porsche 963	Porsche 9RD 4.6 L Turbo V8	(Italy) Gianmaria Bruni (United Kingdom) Harry Tincknell (Switzerland) Neel Jani								8		9	3			10th	814
2023	(Germany) Proton Competition	LMP2	55	Oreca 07	Gibson GK428 V8	(Australia) James Allen (Italy) Gianmaria Bruni (Italy) Francesco Pizzi (United States) Fred Poordad	1													10th	0
2023	(United States) WeatherTech Racing	GTD Pro	79	Mercedes-AMG GT3 Evo	Mercedes-AMG M159 6.2 L V8	(Andorra) Jules Gounon (Spain) Daniel Juncadella (Germany) Maro Engel (United States) Cooper MacNeil	1	3	5	1	4	3	5	5	5	1	1			2nd	3648
2024							DAY	SEB	LBH	LGA	DET	WGL	MOS	ELK	VIR	IMS	ATL				
2024	(Germany) Proton Competition Mustang Sampling	GTP	5	Porsche 963	Porsche 9RD 4.6 L twin-turbo V8	(Italy) Gianmaria Bruni (Netherlands) Bent Viscaal (Belgium) Alessio Picariello (France) Romain Dumas (Switzerland) Neel Jani (France) Julien Andlauer (Germany) Mike Rockenfeller	5	8	5	Ret	Ret	7		5		5	6			9th	2372
2024	(Germany) Proton Competition	GTD	55	Ford Mustang GT3	Ford Coyote 5.4 L V8	(Italy) Giammarco Levorato (United States) Corey Lewis (United States) Ryan Hardwick (Norway) Dennis Olsen (United Kingdom) Ben Barker	Ret	Ret	5	7		17	12	8	7	Ret	Ret			13th	2072
2025*							DAY	SEB	LBH	LGA	DET	WGL	MOS	ELK	VIR	IMS	ATL				
2025*	(Germany) Proton Competition	GTP	5	Porsche 963	Porsche 9RD 4.6 L turbo V8	(Switzerland) Neel Jani (Chile) Nico Pino (France) Tristan Vautier (France) Julien Andlauer (Argentina) Nicolás Varrone	Ret	6				Ret								12th	705
2025*	(Germany) Proton Competition	GTD Pro	20	Porsche 911 GT3 R (992)	Porsche M97/80 4.2 L Flat-6	(Italy) Matteo Cressoni (Austria) Richard Lietz (Italy) Claudio Schiavoni (Austria) Thomas Preining	10	8												11th	477

* Championship ongoing.
