= Seikel Motorsport =

German auto racing team

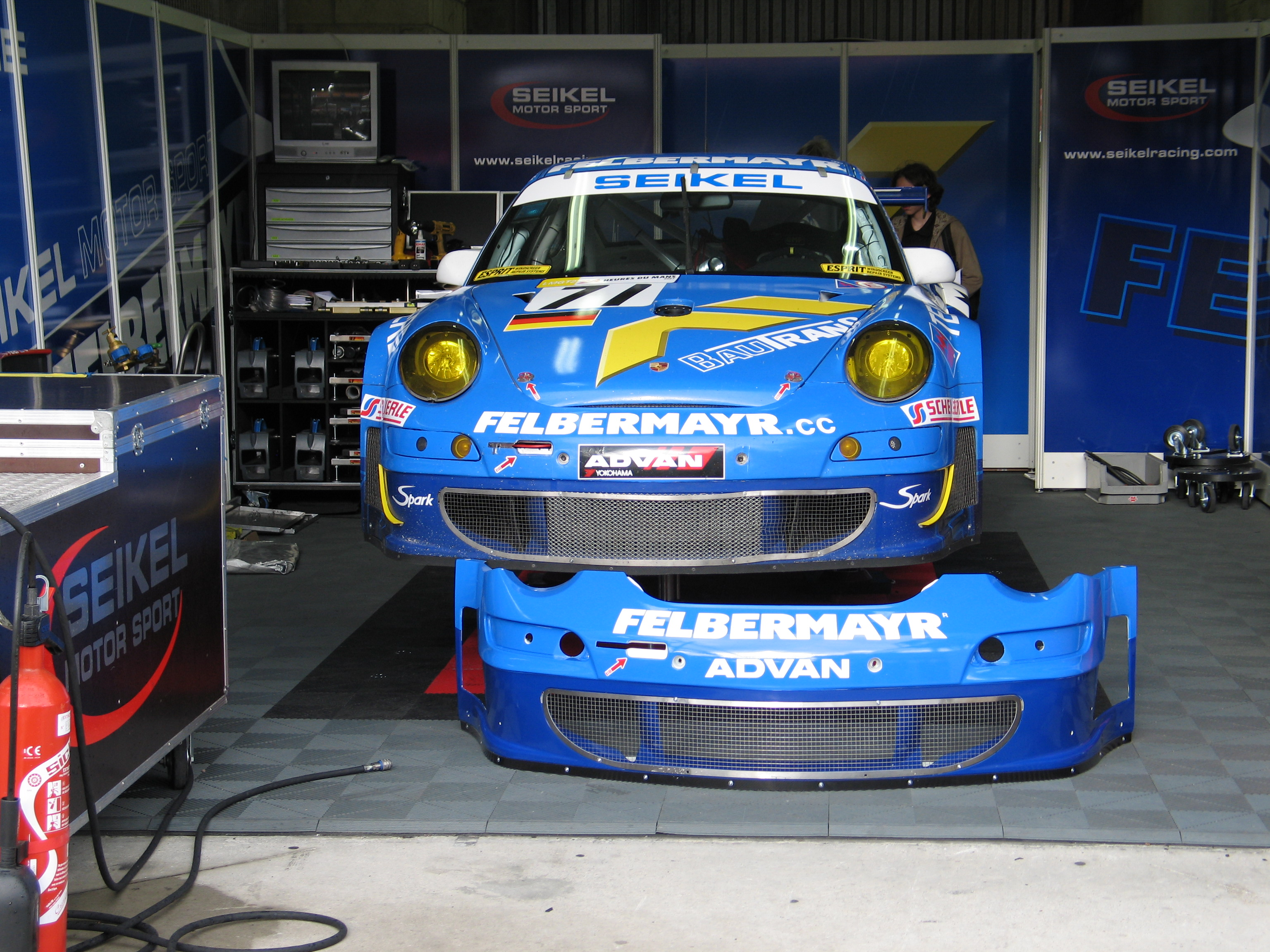
Seikel's final motorsports entry, a Porsche 997 GT3-RSR, at the 2007 24 Hours of Le Mans.

Seikel Motorsport was a German auto racing team founded by Peter Seikel in 1968. After running national series, the team moved on to touring car racing before finally grand tourer racing. Peter Seikel officially retired in 2007 at the 24 Hours of Le Mans, officially ending the team as well.

Following a move to international motorsports in 1978, Seikel was part of Audi's presence in the European Touring Car Championship. They aided Audi in winning the 1980 constructors championship, while Peter Seikel himself had taken the Group N drivers championship in 1979. The team would later move to running BMWs, Fords, and Toyotas in the championship until it was dissolved in 1988.

Seikel would then be hired by Honda to develop the Civic for touring car racing, then running an NSX in the German national GT series. However, in 1994 Seikel would move to Porsche, and concentrate on the new BPR Global GT Series, as well as running the 24 Hours of Le Mans. The team ran BPR, as well as its later incarnation the FIA GT Championship until 1998 before concentrating solely on endurances races. The team would earn class wins at the 6 Hours of Vallelunga and 1000km Monza. However the team's best achievement would be a class win at the 2001 24 Hours of Le Mans.

With the creation of the new Le Mans Endurance Series in 2004, the team would concentrate on the series will also running Le Mans. However, Peter Seikel decided to retire from motorsports at the end of 2006. In 2007, Seikel contested their final race, having earned an automatic invitation from the 24 Hours of Le Mans organisers for their result the previous year. Seikel would reach an agreement with Team Felbermayr-Proton to use their drivers while Seikel's men prepared the car. The car would be unable to finish the race, marking the end of Seikel's racing career.

Peter Seikel also runs an off-road 4x4 company and rally team under the name Auto Seikel.

== Racing record ==
=== 24 Hours of Le Mans results ===
Year	Entrant	No.	Car	Drivers	Class	Laps	Pos.	Class Pos.
1994	(West Germany) Seikel Motorsport	58	Porsche 968 RS	(West Germany) Thomas Bscher (Denmark) John Nielsen (United Kingdom) Lindsay Owen-Jones	LM GT2	84	DNF	DNF
1995	(West Germany) Seikel Motorsport	77	Porsche 911 GT2	(Czech Republic) Karel Dolejší (France) Guy Kuster (Germany) Peter Seikel	LM GT2	263	15th	4th
1996	(West Germany) Seikel Motorsport	77	Porsche 911 GT2	(France) Guy Fuster (Austria) Manfred Jurasz (Japan) Takaji Suzuki	LM GT2	297	18th	5th
1996	(New Zealand) New Hardware PARR Motorsport (West Germany) Seikel Motorsport	83	Porsche 911 GT2	(New Zealand) Andrew Bagnall (Monaco) Stéphane Ortelli (United States) Andy Pilgrim	LM GT2	299	17th	4th
2000	(West Germany) Seikel Motorsport	76	Porsche 911 GT3-R	(Canada) Anthony Burgess (Morocco) Max Cohen-Olivar (Belgium) Michel Neugarten	LMGT	302	18th	3rd
2001	(West Germany) Seikel Motorsport	82	Porsche 911 GT3-RS	(New Zealand) Andrew Bagnall (Canada) Anthony Burgess (Morocco) Max Cohen-Olivar	LMGT	272	12th	6th
2001	(West Germany) Seikel Motorsport	83	Porsche 911 GT3-RS	(Italy) Fabio Babini (Italy) Luca Drudi (Italy) Gabrio Rosa	LMGT	283	6th	1st
2002	(West Germany) Seikel Motorsport	82	Porsche 911 GT3-RS	(Italy) Luca Drudi (Italy) Luca Riccitelli (Italy) Gabrio Rosa	LMGT	315	22nd	4th
2003	(West Germany) Seikel Motorsport	83	Porsche 911 GT3-RS	(New Zealand) Andrew Bagnall (Canada) Anthony Burgess (Canada) David Shep	LMGT	134	DNF	DNF
2004	(West Germany) Seikel Motorsport	83	Porsche 911 GT3-RS	(Italy) Alex Caffi (Netherlands) Peter van Merksteijn (Italy) Gabrio Rosa	LMGT	148	DNF	DNF
2004	(West Germany) Seikel Motorsport	84	Porsche 911 GT3-RS	(New Zealand) Andrew Bagnall (Canada) Anthony Burgess (United States) Philip Collin	LMGT	317	15th	4th
2005	(West Germany) Seikel Motorsport	83	Porsche 911 GT3-RSR	(United States) Philip Collin (Canada) David Shep (Austria) Horst Felbermayr	GT2	274	23rd	7th
2006	(West Germany) Seikel Motorsport (West Germany) Farnbacher Racing	83	Porsche 911 GT3-RS	(Germany) Pierre Ehret (Germany) Dominik Farnbacher (Denmark) Lars-Erik Nielsen	GT2	320	16th	2nd
2007	(West Germany) Seikel Motorsport (West Germany) Team Felbermayr-Proton	71	Porsche 997 GT3-RSR	(United States) Philip Collin (Austria) Horst Felbermayr (Austria) Horst Felbermayr Jr.	GT2	68	DNF	DNF
