= List of Dallara cars =

This is a list of cars produced by Dallara.

Year	Car	Picture	Class
1973	Dallara 1300		Group 5 Sports Cars
1974	Dallara 1600		Group 5 Sports Cars
1975	Dallara Icsunonove		Group 5 Special Production
1976	Dallara/Wolf WD1		Can-Am
1978	Emiliani 380		Formula 3
1981	Dallara 381		Formula 3
1982	Dallara 382		Formula 3
1982	Lancia LC1		Group 6
1983	Dallara 383		Formula 3
1983	Lancia LC2		Group C
1984	Dallara 384		Formula 3
1985	Dallara F385		Formula 3
1986	Dallara F386		Formula 3
1987	Dallara F387		Formula 3
1988	Dallara 3087		International Formula 3000; Formula 1
1988	Dallara F388		Formula 3
1988	Dallara F188		Formula 1
1989	Dallara F189		Formula 1
1989	Dallara F389		Formula 3
1990	Dallara F190		Formula 1
1990	Dallara F390		Formula 3
1991	Dallara F191		Formula 1
1991	Dallara F391		Formula 3
1992	Dallara F192		Formula 1
1992	Dallara F392		Formula 3
1993	Dallara F393		Formula 3
1993	Ferrari 333 SP		Le Mans Prototype
1994	Dallara F394		Formula 3
1995	Dallara F395		Formula 3
1996	Dallara F396		Formula 3
1996	Ferrari F50 GT		Group GT1 (unraced)
1997	Dallara F397		Formula 3
1997	Dallara IR-7		Indy Racing League
1998	Dallara F398		Formula 3
1998	Honda RA099		Formula 1 prototype
1999	Dallara F399		Formula 3
1999	Toyota GT-One		LMGTP
2000	Dallara F300		Formula 3 Euroformula Open
2000	Dallara IR-00		Indy Racing League
2001	Dallara F301		Formula 3
2002	Dallara F302		Formula 3
2002	Dallara GC21		LMP2
2002	Dallara IPS		IRL Infiniti Pro Series
2002	Dallara SN01		World Series by Nissan
2002	Dallara SP1		LMP900
	Audi R8		LMP900
2003	Dallara F303		Formula 3
2003	Dallara IR-03		IndyCar Series
2004	Dallara F304		Formula 3
2005	Dallara F305		Formula 3 Euroformula Open
2005	Dallara GP2/05		GP2 Series
2005	Dallara T05		Formula Renault 3.5
2006	Dallara F306		Formula 3
2007	Dallara F307		Formula 3
2008	Dallara DP01		Daytona Prototype Gen2
2008	Dallara F308		Formula 3 Euroformula Open
2008	Dallara Formulino Basic		ADAC Formel Masters
2008	Dallara Formulino Plus		ADAC Formel Masters
2008	Dallara Formulino Pro		MRF Formula 2000
2008	Dallara GP2/08		GP2 Series
2008	Dallara T08		Formula Renault 3.5
2008	KTM X-Bow		ultra-light sports car
2008	Dallara IR-05		IndyCar Series
2009	Dallara F309		Formula 3
2010	Dallara F310		Formula 3
2010	Hispania F110		Formula 1
2010	Dallara GP3/10		GP3 Series
2011	Dallara F311		Formula 3
2011	Dallara GP2/11		GP2 Series; GP2 Asia Series; FIA Formula 2 Championship
2011	Dallara P217		LMP2
2012	Dallara DW12		IndyCar Series
2012	Dallara F312		Formula 3 Euroformula Open
2012	Dallara T12		Formula Renault 3.5
2013	Dallara F313		Formula 3
2013	Dallara GP3/13		GP3 Series
2014	Dallara F314		Formula 3
2014	Dallara SF14		Super Formula
2014	Spark-Renault SRT 01E		Formula E
2015	Dallara IL-15		Indy Lights
2015	Lamborghini Huracán LP620-2 Super Trofeo		Lamborghini Super Trofeo
2015	Lamborghini Huracán GT3		Group GT3
2015	Renault Sport R.S. 01		Renault Sport Trophy
2016	Dallara GP3/16		GP3 Series
2016	Haas VF-16		Formula 1
2017	Cadillac DPi-V.R		Daytona Prototype International
2017	Dallara F317		Formula 3
2017	Dallara P217		LMP2
2017	Dallara Stradale		none
2017	Haas VF-17		Formula 1
2018	BR Engineering BR1		LMP1
2018	Dallara F2 2018		FIA Formula 2 Championship
2018	Dallara F318		Formula 3
2018	Haas VF-18		Formula 1
2018	Spark SRT05e		Formula E
2019	Dallara F3 2019		FIA Formula 3 Championship
2019	Dallara SF19		Super Formula
2019	Haas VF-19		Formula 1
2020	Dallara 320		SF Lights; Euroformula Open
2020	Haas VF-20		Formula 1
2021	Dallara AV-21		Indy Autonomous Challenge
2021	Haas VF-21		Formula 1
2022	Haas VF-22		Formula 1
2023	BMW M Hybrid V8		LMDh
2023	Cadillac V-Series.R		LMDh
2023	Dallara SF23		Super Formula
2023	Ferrari 499P		LMH
2023	Haas VF-23		Formula 1
2024	Dallara 324		SF Lights; Euroformula Open
2024	Dallara EAV24		Abu Dhabi Autonomous Racing League
2024	Dallara F2 2024		FIA Formula 2 Championship
2024	Haas VF-24		Formula 1
2024	IAC AV-24		Indy Autonomous Challenge
2025	Dallara F3 2025		FIA Formula 3 Championship
2025	Haas VF-25		Formula 1
2026	Dallara 326		Eurocup-3
2026	Haas VF-26		Formula 1
2027	McLaren LMDh		LMDh
2028	Dallara IR-28		IndyCar Series
