= Dallara F192 =

Formula One racing car

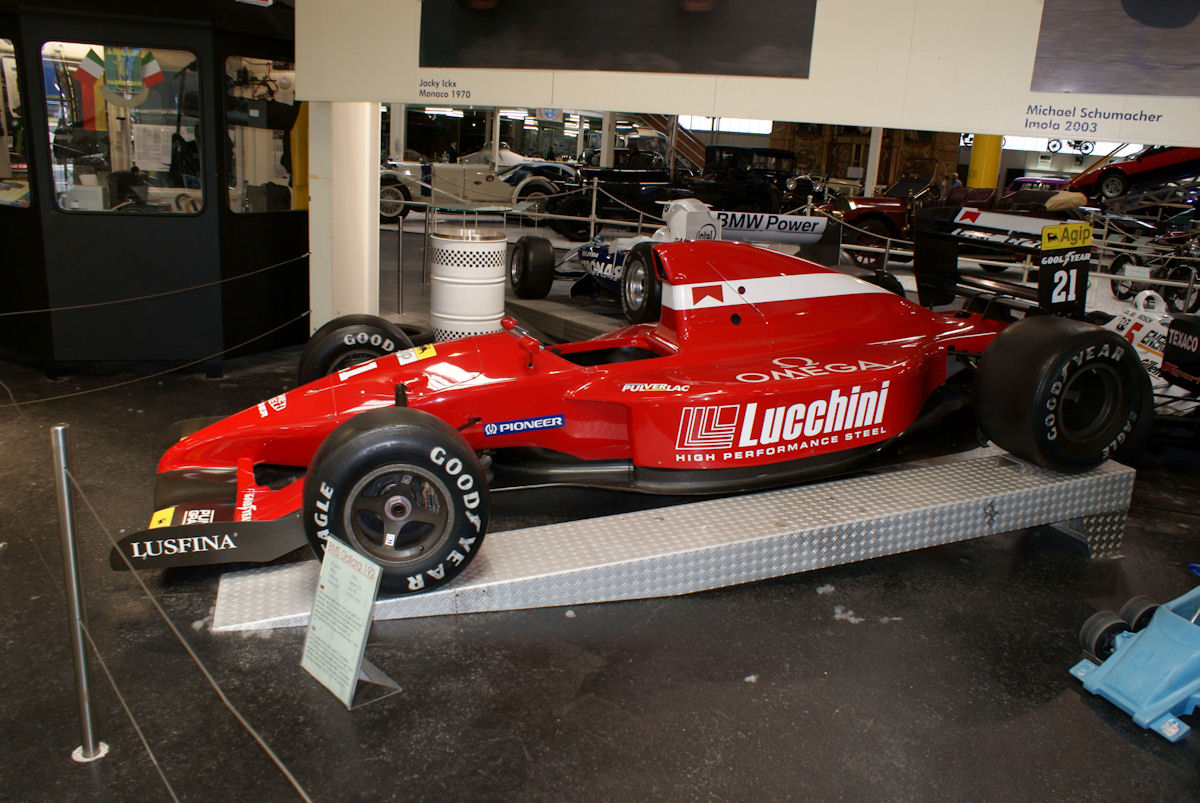
- The car's 1992 livery showcased on a Fondmetal GR02.
- Category: Formula One
- Constructor: Dallara
- Designer: Giampaolo Dallara
- Predecessor: Dallara F191
- Successor: Lola T93/30 (Scuderia Italia)

Technical specifications
- Chassis: Carbon Fibre Monocoque
- Axle track: Front: 1,817 mm (71.5 in); Rear: 1,616 mm (63.6 in)
- Wheelbase: 2,960 mm (117 in)
- Engine: Ferrari Tipo 037 3,499 cc (213.5 cu in), V12, NA, mid-engine, longitudinally-mounted
- Transmission: Dallara 6-speed transverse
- Power: 710–720 hp @ 13,800 rpm
- Weight: 505kg
- Fuel: Agip
- Tyres: Goodyear

Competition history
- Notable entrants: BMS Scuderia Italia
- Notable drivers: 21. (Finland) JJ Lehto; 22. (Italy) Pierluigi Martini
- Debut: 1992 South African Grand Prix
Races	Wins	Poles	F/Laps
16	0	0	0

The Dallara F192 was a Formula One car designed by Giampaolo Dallara, of Dallara, and used by the BMS Scuderia Italia team during the 1992 Formula One season. The car was powered by the Ferrari V12 engine and ran on Goodyear tyres.

First raced in the South African Grand Prix, the F192's best finish was two 6th places, both achieved by Pierluigi Martini, at the Spanish Grand Prix and San Marino Grand Prix respectively. It was the last Dallara chassis to be used by Scuderia Italia and the final Formula One chassis made by Dallara until 2016.

== Design and development ==
For the 1992 season, team owner Giuseppe Lucchini took over Ferrari's engine supply arrangement with Minardi. This arrangement provided the team with Ferrari 3.5 litres (3,500 cc) V12 engines, although to 1991 specification. The chassis, designed by Giampaolo Dallara, was a development of the previous year's car but adapted for use with the new engine, which required a larger fuel cell. It was the only 1992 car to use a high front wing with deep end plates which, after the first race of the year, were supported by cables.

The car's monocoque chassis was of carbon fibre and provided with Dallara's own six-speed transverse gearbox. The F192 was configured with double wishbone pushrod suspension having a single damper at the front but dual dampers at the rear. Partway through the season, the front suspension was switched to a dual damper system. Brakes were by Brembo with Carbone Industrie pads. The steering was of a Momo design and the car ran on Goodyear tyres. Its wheelbase was 2,960 millimetres (116.5 in), the front track was 1,817 millimetres (71.5 in) while the rear track was 1,616 millimetres (63.6 in). The capacity of the fuel tank was 225 litres (49.5 imp gal) and fuel and oil was supplied by Agip. The overall weight of the car was 505 kilograms (1,113.3 lb).

Presented in a largely red colour with white trim, the F192 carried sponsorship from cigarette brand Marlboro, SPAL, Fin-Eco, the fuel concern Agip and Lucchini's own steel manufacturing concern.

The team's drivers both complained about the handling of the car and consequently aerodynamics and the suspension were refined continuously throughout the year. The suspension was particularly sensitive, and the original Koni dampers were laterally swapped out for Penske product and then Dynamic Suspension units. The results achieved by the end of the European stage of the season were not what was expected and for the following season, Lucchini decided to use a chassis designed by Lola. This ended a five-year relationship with Dallara.

== Race history ==
For the 1992 season, Scuderia Italia had recruited Pierluigi Martini, who had driven the previous year for Minardi. His teammate was JJ Lehto, who had driven for Scuderia Italia the previous year. The F192 made its debut at the first race of the 1992 season at the South African Grand Prix, qualifying 24th (Lehto) and 25th (Martini) fastest. There were a number of technical issues in qualifying that affected the team's performance. In the race itself, the drivers both retired. Lehto was running in 11th when his driveshaft failed on lap 47. Martini, following a collision with Mauricio Gugelmin's Jordan-Yamaha on lap 1, was in last place when he retired on lap 57.

Some of the technical issues that had affected the F192 in South Africa had largely been resolved for the next race, Lehto qualifying in 7th and Martini in 9th, ahead of both the works Ferrari cars. Only Lehto finished the race, in 8th, having to change tires partway through due to heavy steering. Martini was even more affected by the steering, making three stops for tires before retiring from last place on lap 37. At the Brazilian Grand Prix, Martini qualified in 8th while Lehto was 16th on the grid. During the race, Martini was running in the points before retiring on lap 17 with clutch failure. Lehto finished 8th, having to make an extra tire stop following a puncture.

The Spanish Grand Prix saw Lehto and Martini qualifying 12th and 13th respectively. Martini capitalised on late race retirements to finish in 6th place, earning Scuderia Italia's first point of the season. Lehto made an error on lap 58, spinning out while holding 8th place. At San Marino, the team received uprated Ferrari engines but both cars had handling and driveshaft issues during qualifying, with Martini and Lehto placing 15th and 16th on the grid. In the race itself, the duo ran most of the race behind Michele Alboreto's Footwork-Mugen and by lap 57 was holding 6th and 7th, when Lehto retired with a blown engine. He was still classified, in 11th place, while Martini went on to finish in 6th again. At Monaco, Martini qualified in 18th and Lehto 20th. The latter went on to finish the race in 9th, two laps down on the winner while Martini was pushed out of the race on lap 1 by Stefano Modena in the Jordan-Yamaha.

At the Canadian race, both drivers found the handling of the F192 to be particularly dire. Martini ended up qualifying 15th on the grid but Lehto was 23rd. In the race, both drivers finished in 8th (Martini) and 9th (Lehto) respectively. The team had another double finish in the following French Grand Prix, Lehto in 9th with Martini a place behind, having been penalised 10 seconds for jumping the start. They had qualified in 17th and 25th respectively, Lehto ahead of Martini. At the British Grand Prix, Lehto, using a new double damper system on his front suspension, qualified in 19th while Martini was 22nd on the grid. On race day, both cars finished although out of the points, in 13th (Lehto) and 15th (Martini).

In Germany Martini qualified 18th, now also running the dual damper system on the front suspension, while Lehto was further behind in 21st place. Both cars finished, Lehto in 10th ahead of his teammate, who was a lapped 11th. In the Hungarian race, the team's drivers struggled. Martini only just made the grid in 26th and last place while Lehto failed entirely. Martini retired while running in 14th and last place on lap 40, having been penalised 10 seconds for holding up race leader Nigel Mansell.

Lehto qualified for the Belgian Grand Prix in 16th place, three places ahead of Martini. The latter had an accident at the Eau Rouge corner during practice which badly damaged his car. He failed to last a lap in the race itself, retiring after stalling his engine trying to restart after a spin. Lehto finished in 7th place although he had been in a points paying position until he was caught by Ayrton Senna and Johnny Herbert towards the end of the race. For his and the team's home race, Martini finished in 8th place having qualified in 22nd place. Lehto had run as high as 7th, having started from 14th on the grid, but towards the end of the race suffered electrical problems and end up classified in 11th, 6 laps down on the race winner.

In Portugal, Lehto qualified in 19th and Martini in 21st, even with the benefit of a new front wing which improved the F192's aerodynamic performance. During the race, both drivers picked up debris from Riccardo Patrese's lap 44 accident on the main straight; Martini punctured two tires and retired on lap 44 while Lehto similarly retired after running over a portion of the driveshaft of Patrese's Williams FW14 which penetrated the tub of his F192. At the Japanese Grand Prix, Martini placed 19th on the grid but went on to finish 10th. Lehto qualified in 22nd but finished ahead of his teammate in 9th.

At the final race of the year, the Australian Grand Prix, Martini started from 14th on the grid but retired from the race, after Olivier Grouillard, in the Tyrrell, collided with him at the first corner. Qualifying 24th fastest, Lehto ran as high as 12th before retiring towards the end of the race with gearbox failure.

Martini placed 14th equal in the 1992 Driver's Championship with two points, while Lehto failed to place at all. Scuderia Italia's total of two points saw it finish 10th in the Constructor's Championship.

== Complete Formula One results ==
(key) (results in bold indicate pole position; results in italics indicate fastest lap)

Year	Chassis	Engine(s)	Tyres	Drivers	1	2	3	4	5	6	7	8	9	10	11	12	13	14	15	16	Points	WCC
1992	Dallara F192	Ferrari V12 037	**G**		RSA	MEX	BRA	ESP	SMR	MON	CAN	FRA	GBR	GER	HUN	BEL	ITA	POR	JPN	AUS	**2**	**10th**
1992	Dallara F192	Ferrari V12 037	**G**	JJ Lehto	Ret	8	8	Ret	11*	9	9	9	13	10	DNQ	7	Ret	Ret	9	Ret	**2**	**10th**
1992	Dallara F192	Ferrari V12 037	**G**	Pierluigi Martini	Ret	Ret	Ret	6	6	Ret	8	10	15	11	Ret	Ret	8	Ret	10	Ret	**2**	**10th**
