= BMS Scuderia Italia =

Italian auto racing team

(Italy) BMS Scuderia Italia
- Founded: 1983
- Base: Brescia, Lombardy, Italy
- Team principal(s): Giuseppe Lucchini
- Former series: Formula Renault 2.0 NEC; Eurocup Mégane Trophy; Italian Rally Championship; World Touring Car; Formula One; Super Tourenwagen Cup; Italian Superturismo; Le Mans Series; International GT Open; FIA GT Championship; FIA GT3 Championship; Italian GT Championship; Formula Renault 2.0 Alps
- Teams' Championships: 2001 FIA Sportscar; 2003 FIA GT; 2004 FIA GT; 2005 LMS
- Drivers' Championships: 2001 FIA Sportscar (Zadra); 2003 FIA GT (Biaggi/Bobbi); 2004 FIA GT (Gollin/Cappellari); 2005 LMS (Bartyan/Pescatori/Seiler)
- Website: http://www.scuderiaitalia.it/

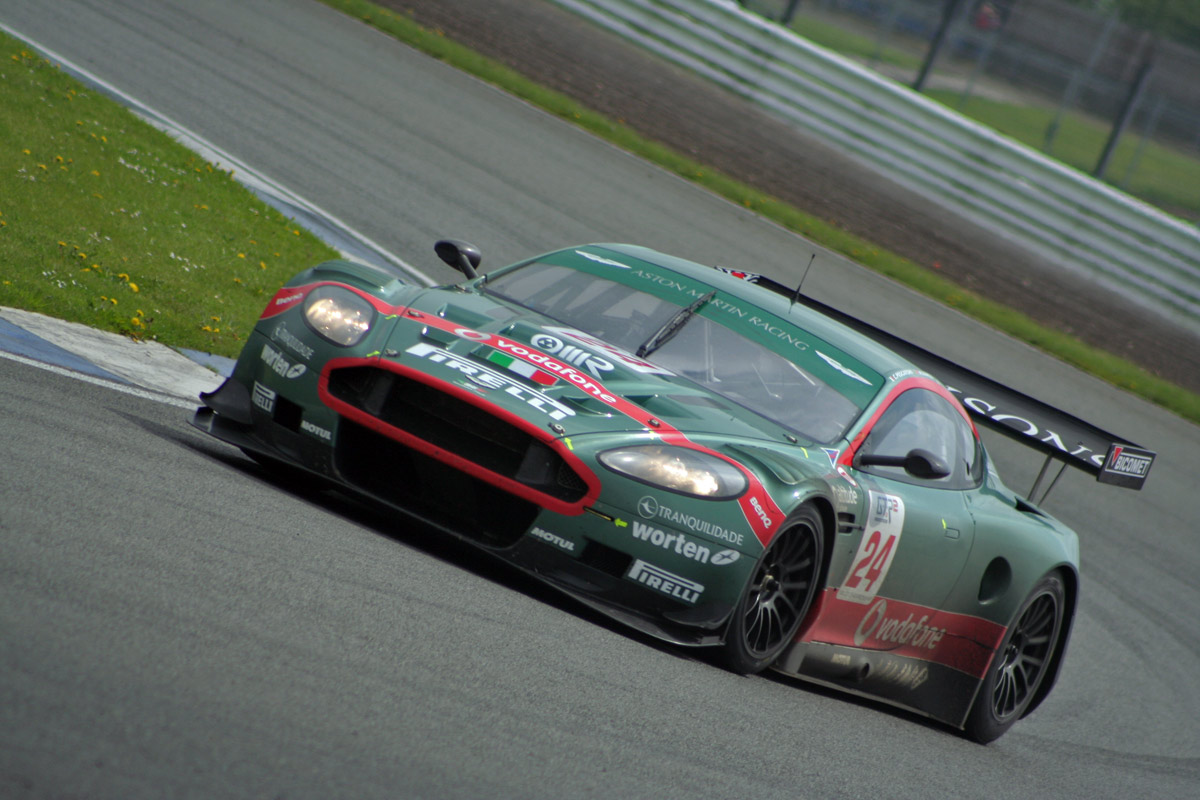
An Aston Martin DBR9 entered by BMS Scuderia Italia. The team's cars traditionally feature a large stripe painted across the nose or bonnet.

BMS Scuderia Italia SpA (sometimes referred to as simply Scuderia Italia) is an auto racing team founded in 1983 in Brescia by Italian businessman and motorsports enthusiast Giuseppe Lucchini. Originally named Brixia Motor Sport (BMS), the team initially competed in the World Touring Car Championship. The team's name was altered to BMS Scuderia Italia upon its entrance into Formula One in 1988. After departing Formula One in 1993, BMS Scuderia Italia has continued to be involved in other categories such as touring car racing and sports car racing.

Scuderia Italia has been associated with many automobile manufacturers, including Alfa Romeo, Lancia, Ferrari, Nissan, Porsche, and Aston Martin. The team raced Ferrari F430s in the FIA GT Championship, while their Brixia Racing arm competed in the FIA GT3 European Championship and Italian GT Championship with Aston Martin DBRS9s.

== Brixia Motor Sport ==
Giuseppe Lucchini started his career in motor racing in the late 1970s with Osella. He later moved on to Mirabella Racing, where he oversaw the team's efforts in the Italian Group 6 Championship and the World Endurance Championship. In 1983, Lucchini decided to form his own team. Named after the original Latin name for the team's base of Brescia, Brixia Motor Sport campaigned an Alfa Romeo GTV6 in the Italian Rally Championship before replacing it with a Lancia 037 in 1985. Brixia returned to Alfa Romeo in 1987 as the team expanded to enter the new Alfa Romeo 75 in both the World Touring Car Championship and the Italian Rally Championship.

== Formula One ==
Scuderia Italia
- Full name: BMS Scuderia Italia
- Founder(s): Giuseppe Lucchini
- Noted drivers: (Italy) Alex Caffi (Italy) Andrea de Cesaris (Italy) Gianni Morbidelli (Italy) Emanuele Pirro (Finland) JJ Lehto (Italy) Pierluigi Martini (Italy) Michele Alboreto (Italy) Luca Badoer

Formula One World Championship career
- First entry: 1988 Brazilian Grand Prix
- Races entered: 96
- Constructors: Dallara-Ford, Dallara-Judd, Dallara-Ferrari, Lola-Ferrari
- Constructors' Championships: 0 (best finish: 8th, 1989 and 1991)
- Drivers' Championships: 0
- Race victories: 0 (best finish: 3rd, 1989 Canadian Grand Prix and 1991 San Marino Grand Prix)
- Podiums: 2
- Pole positions: 0 (best grid position: 3rd, 1989 Hungarian Grand Prix and 1990 United States Grand Prix)
- Fastest laps: 0
- Final entry: 1993 Portuguese Grand Prix

When Alfa Romeo chose to withdraw from the World Touring Car Championship in 1987, Lucchini set his sights on entering the Formula One World Championship in the coming year. Brixia brokered a deal with Dallara owner Giampaolo Dallara to build a new chassis based on their experience as a Formula 3000 entry. Lucchini renamed his team BMS Scuderia Italia (with Dallara being the listed constructor for the purposes of the World Constructors' Championship standings) and hired former Scuderia Mirabella owner Vittorio Palazzani as sporting director. Sergio Rinland designed the new Dallara F188 and also served as the team's chief engineer. Cosworth provided their Ford DFZ V8 and Italian Alex Caffi was signed to drive the team's sole entry. The car was late being completed, forcing the team to bring a Dallara Formula 3000 car to the first meeting in Brazil. The team was unable to score any points, but qualified for fourteen of sixteen races during the year. Caffi earned a best finish of seventh at the Portuguese Grand Prix, one position outside of the points.

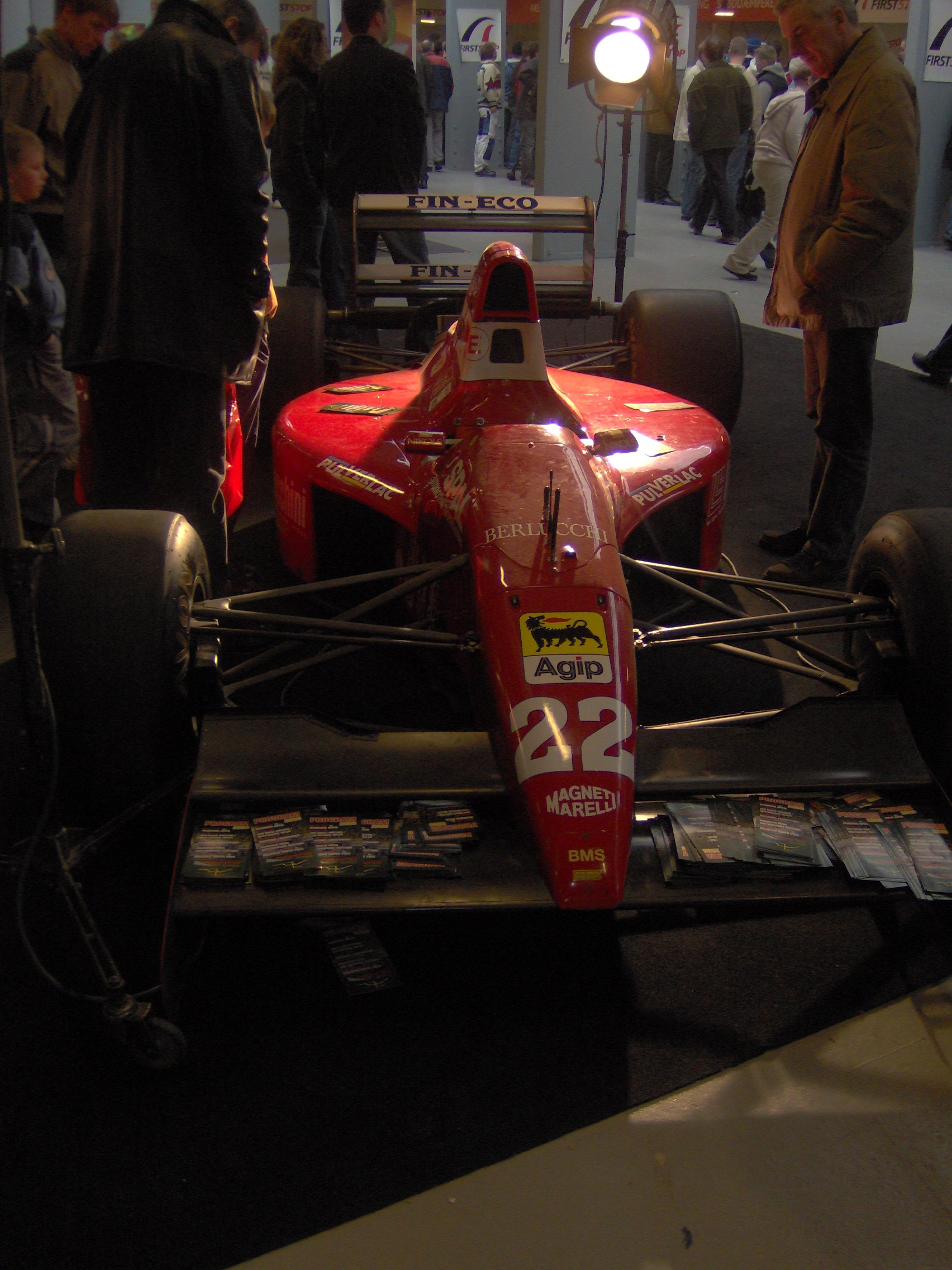
JJ Lehto's Dallara F191-Judd entered by BMS Scuderia Italia in 1991.

Returning for 1989, BMS Scuderia Italia entered a second car for the experienced Italian Andrea de Cesaris alongside Caffi. The team's new Dallara F189s were designed by new engineer Mario Tolentino. At the third race of the year, the Monaco Grand Prix, Caffi earned the team's first points finish when he came home in fourth. Later that season, at the Canadian Grand Prix, the team scored points with both drivers, De Cesaris earning the team's first podium by finishing third and Caffi by finishing sixth. There were no more point finishes for the rest of the season, although Caffi qualified an outstanding third in the Hungarian Grand Prix and both cars qualified in the top 10 in the season-ending Australian Grand Prix. De Cesaris and Caffi were thus ranked 17th in the Drivers' Championship, while the combined total of eight points earned Dallara eighth in the Constructors' Championship.

In 1990, team manager Patrizio Cantù departed the team and was replaced by former Ferrari engineer Pierpaolo Gardella. Alex Caffi also left the team, moving to Arrows. Emanuele Pirro was signed as his replacement, although Gianni Morbidelli raced for the first two races of the season when Pirro was unwell. The team struggled throughout the year, unable to earn points in any races (although de Cesaris started 3rd in the season-opening United States Grand Prix) and was only able to complete seven of the sixteen Grands Prix on the calendar.

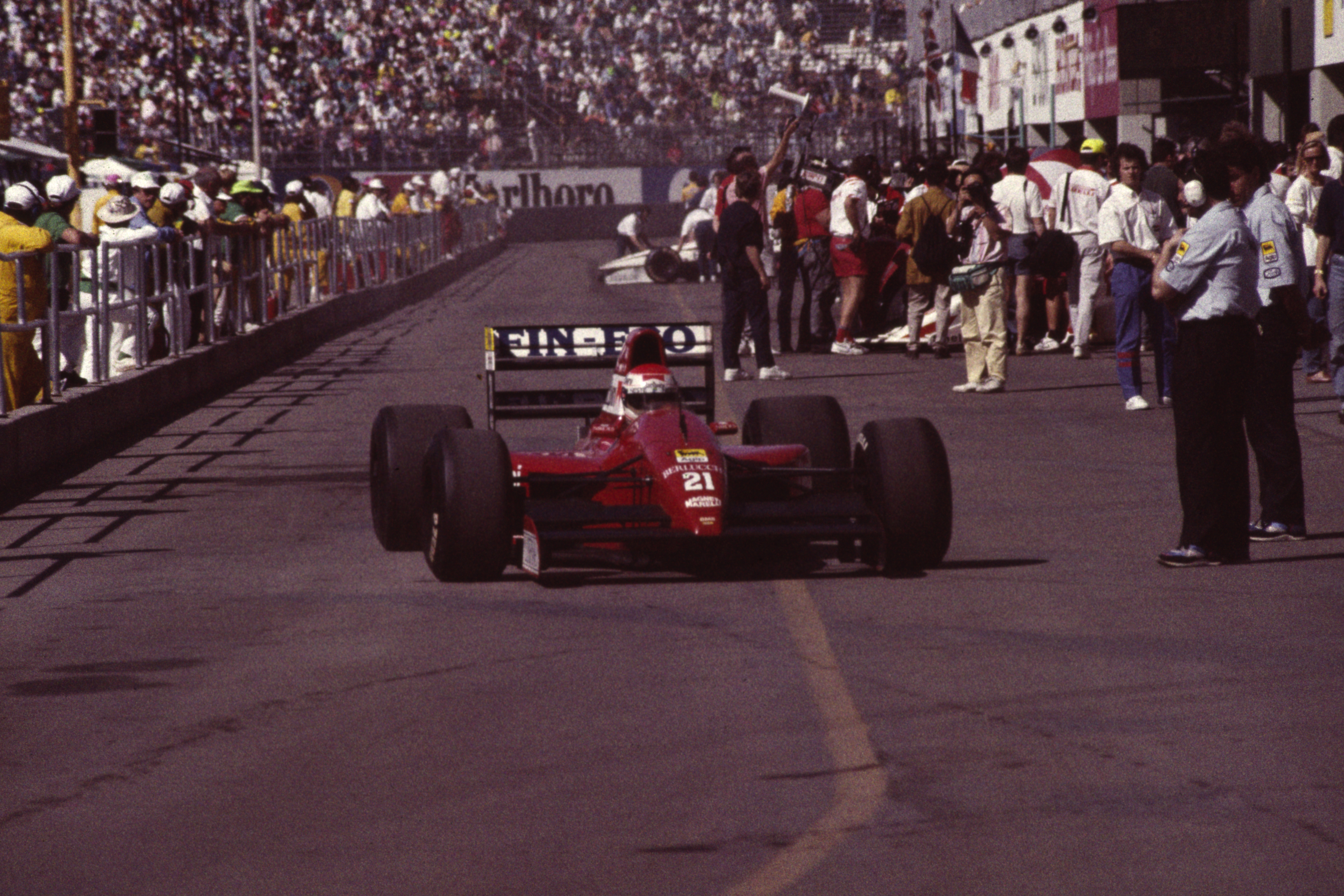
Emanuele Pirro driving BMS Scuderia Italia's Dallara-Judd at the 1991 United States Grand Prix

Disappointed with the Dallara F190, Lucchini replaced Tolentino with Nigel Cowperthwaite in 1991 for the design of the F191, and the team's Ford Cosworth engines were replaced by new Judd V10s. Jyrki Järvilehto, otherwise known as JJ Lehto, was signed to replace De Cesaris, who had moved to Jordan, and gained BMS Scuderia Italia their first points of the season by finishing third at the San Marino Grand Prix. Pirro scored his first points by finishing sixth at the Monaco Grand Prix. Dallara once again finished eighth in the Constructors' Championship standings.

In 1992, Lucchini was able to negotiate the use of year-old Ferrari V12 engines for the 1992 season and hired Pierluigi Martini as a replacement for Pirro, who had been released by the team. Martini scored the team's only points of the year with two consecutive sixth-place finishes at the Spanish Grand Prix and San Marino Grand Prix, earning him sixteenth in the Drivers' Championship and Dallara tenth in the Constructors' Championship.

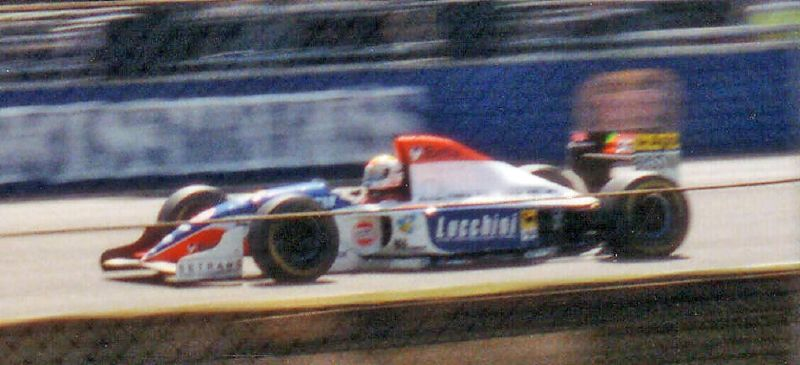
A Minardi M194 features sponsorship from Giuseppe Lucchini's steel company after BMS Scuderia Italia merged with Minardi

At the end of 1992, Lucchini announced that the cars for the 1993 season would be built by Lola Cars in Britain, with Ferrari remaining as the engine supplier. The team secured a sponsorship deal with Chesterfield cigarettes, and Lucchini signed Michele Alboreto and rookie Luca Badoer as drivers.

The team's switch to Lola, however, did not improve the team's results. The chassis was not competitive, and despite good engine power, Alboreto and Badoer struggled to qualify for several races due to a rule lasting until Germany that limited the race grid to 25 starters. Badoer had the team's best finish of the year at the San Marino Grand Prix with a seventh place, ensuring the team finished ahead of Tyrrell Racing, whose best finish was Ukyo Katayama's tenth place at Hungaroring, in the Constructors' standings. By the end of the season the team was financially strained and chose to withdraw from the last two events in Japan and Australia. The team did however attend the 1993 Formula One Indoor Trophy, but were eliminated in the semi-finals.

At the end of the 1993 season Minardi was also struggling for money, and Giancarlo Minardi and Giuseppe Lucchini decided to merge their teams in order to continue into the 1994 season. The merged team returned to earning points in 1994 as well as 1995 before Lucchini chose to exit the venture in order to concentrate BMS Scuderia Italia on other programs.

== Return to touring cars ==
When Lucchini's Formula One program came to an end in 1993, Nissan approached BMS Scuderia Italia to campaign the company's Primeras in the new German Super Tourenwagen Cup, which was announced for 1994. German Michael Bartels and Italian Ivan Capelli were hired and completed the season sixth and eleventh in the drivers' championship. The team expanded to three cars in 1995, with Capelli joined by Sascha Maassen and Kieth O'Dor. O'Dor won the team's only race of the season at AVUS and finished tenth in the drivers' championship; however, he was killed in a collision during the second race at AVUS that weekend.

Anthony Reid replaced O'Dor on the squad in 1996, but the team chose not to run the full season with all cars. Maassen led the team in the drivers' championship by finishing sixteenth, but by then Giuseppe Lucchini had decided to move out of the Super Tourenwagen Cup, leaving Nissan to move to Team Rosberg. BMS Scuderia Italia made a brief return to touring car racing in 1998 when they entered a pair of Alfa Romeo 155s for Christian Pescatori and Emanuele Moncini in the Italian Superturismo Championship, but withdrew once more the following season.

== Sportscar ==
=== 1997–2001 ===
After the departure from the Super Tourenwagen Cup, Giuseppe Lucchini became one of the first customers of Porsche's new racing car, the 911 GT1. One of the team's former Formula One drivers, Pierluigi Martini, returned to the company and shared the new car with Christian Pescatori in the brand new FIA GT Championship for 1997. The duo scored a best finish of sixth at Helsinki, earning them a single point to tie for ninth in the Teams Championship. BMS Scuderia Italia also entered the 24 Hours of Le Mans for the first time with the 911 GT1, Brazilian Antônio Hermann de Azevedo joining Martini and Pescatori. The team finished in eighth place overall and fourth in their class.

In 1999, the company returned to sports car racing, this time purchasing a pair of Ferrari 333 SP sports prototype for use in the Sports Racing World Cup. Pescatori and Moncini were retained from the team's Italian Superturismo entry the previous year, while father and son, Angelo and Marco Zadra shared the second entry. Pescatori and Moncini scored a win at the Autodromo di Pergusa, eventually finishing third and fourth respectively in the drivers' championship. The team earned second in the Teams Championship, fourteen points shy of JB Racing.

For the 2000 season, Austrian Philipp Peter and Swiss Lilian Bryner and Enzo Calderari joined the two Zadras in the Ferraris. A class win was earned by Bryner, Calderari, and Angelo Zadra at the Circuit de Spa-Francorchamps, although they did not win the race overall. The team finished the season second in the Teams Championship once again, while Marco Zadra and Philipp Peter tied for third in the drivers' championship. Christian Pescatori briefly returned to the squad at the start of the 2001 season of what was now known as the FIA Sportscar Championship, winning alongside Marco Zadra in the first race of the year. Pescatori was eventually replaced by Jean-Marc Gounon, who also earned a victory for the team. BMS Scuderia Italia was able to secure the Teams Championship by a margin of 22 points, while Marco Zadra also won the Drivers' Championship.

=== 2002–2005 ===
With the 333 SP outdated, BMS Scuderia Italia returned to the FIA GT Championship, continuing to campaign for Ferrari by racing two Prodrive-built Ferrari 550 Maranellos in the series. Andrea Piccini and Jean-Denis Délétraz shared the team's primary car, while the other car featured Lilian Bryner, Enzo Calderari, and Frédéric Dor, who was eventually replaced by Jean-Marc Gounon. After only three races, Piccini and Délétraz began a streak of consecutive victories, winning at Jarama, Anderstorp, and Oschersleben. A further fourth victory ended the year at Estoril. Even with four race victories, multiple races without points hurt the team and they were scored fourth in the Teams Championship. Piccini and Délétraz shared third in the drivers' championship.

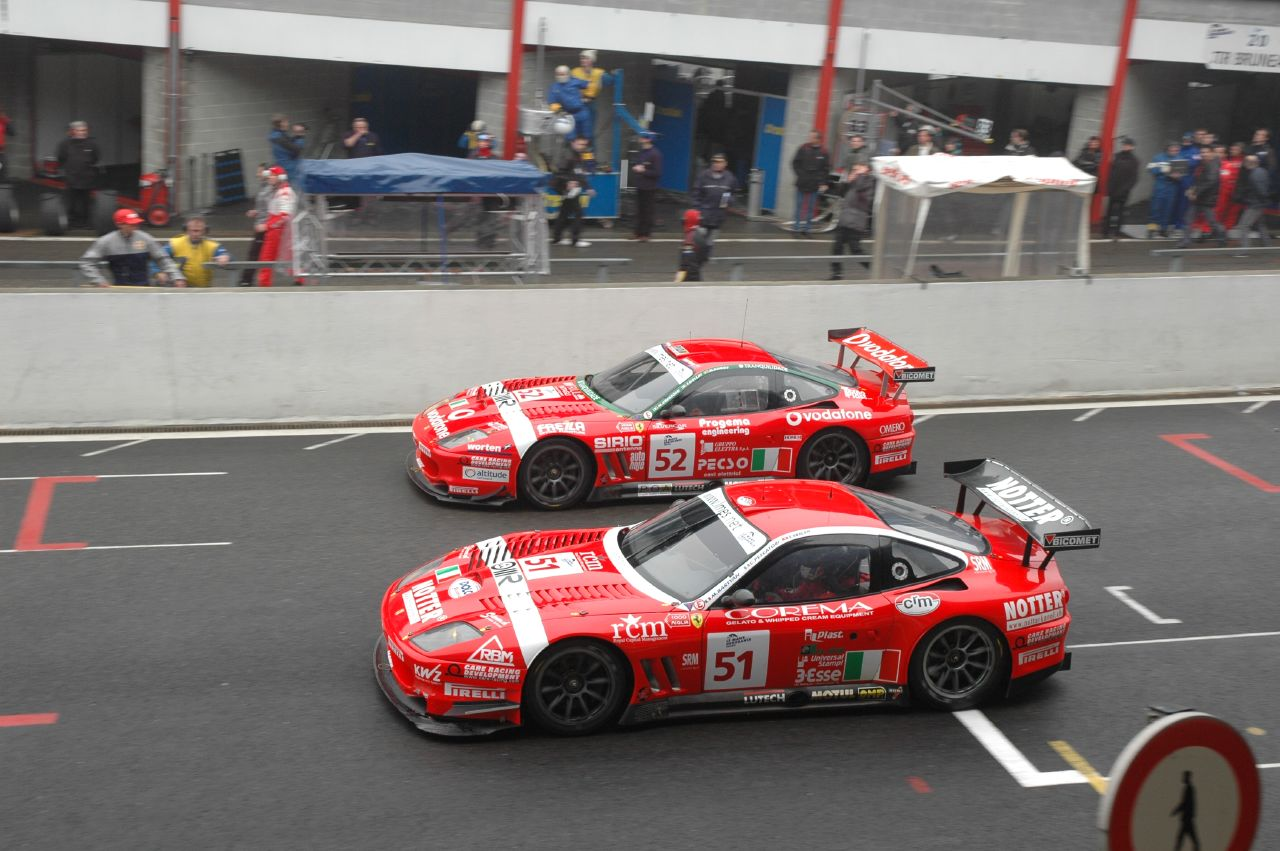
BMS Scuderia Italia's two Ferrari 550 Maranellos earning victory at the 2005 1000 km of Spa

Under the guidance of new Technical Director Marco Gadola, the team expanded greatly in 2003 as a third car was added to their effort, running under the Care Racing banner. The team's driver pairings included Matteo Bobbi and Thomas Biagi, Fabrizio Gollin and Luca Cappellari, and Bryner and Calderari sharing the Care entry with Stefano Livio. The team opened the year on top by finishing first, second, and third at their first race. Bobbi and Biagi dominated the field by winning the next four races in a row, followed by a class win and second overall at the Spa 24 Hours for Gollin, Cappellari, Bryner, and Calderari. Two more wins were earned in the remaining events of the season, giving the team a total of eight victories in ten races, not only earning the Teams Championship for BMS Scuderia Italia, but also third for the Care Racing banner as well. Bobbi and Biagi shared the drivers' championship, Gollin and Cappellari second in the championship, and Bryner and Calderari third.

The three Ferraris returned to defend their Championships in 2004, retaining much of their driver lineup. Gabriele Gardel was the only replacement, taking over from Thomas Biagi as Bobbi's co-driver. The year started well for BMS Scuderia Italia once more as Gollin and Cappellari earned two consecutive victories, while Gardel and Bobbi earned their first at the fourth round of the season. The team also improved on their previous result at the Spa 24 Hours, winning the race overall with Gollin and Cappellari sharing with Bryner and Calderari. Lilian Bryner was therefore the first female driver ever to win an international 24 hours event. The team finished the season with five total victories, winning their second Teams Championship, while Gollin and Cappellari earned the drivers' championship that year.

Although BMS Scuderia Italia was the defending two-time FIA GT Champion, Giuseppe Lucchini decided to switch series in order to concentrate on endurance racing. Two of the team's Ferraris were entered in the new Le Mans Endurance Series as well as the national Italian GT Championship. Christian Pescatori returned to the team, joined by newcomers Michele Bartyan, Toni Seiler, Matteo Cressoni, and Miguel Ramos. The Gollin, Cressoni, and Ramos trio won the opening Le Mans race of the year while Pescatori, Bartyan, and Seiler won two of the remaining four events. In Italian GT, the team won five of the seven races over the year, as well as two races in the GT2 class with a Ferrari 360 Modena GTC run in partnership with Racing Team Edil Cris. Teams Championships were secured in both Le Mans and Italian GT's GT1 classes, earning the squad their third consecutive victorious year with the Ferrari 550. The two 550s were also entered in the 24 Hours of Le Mans for the second time in the team's history. Both however failed to finish the race, retiring early.

=== 2006–2007 ===
After the team's success with Prodrive's customer version of the Ferrari 550, BMS Scuderia Italia was one of two teams selected by Prodrive to become a factory-backed entry for Aston Martin and their new DBR9 race car. Prodrive's own team was concentrating on the 24 Hours of Le Mans, while Larbre Compétition was tasked with competing in the Le Mans Series. This left BMS Scuderia Italia, now running under the Aston Martin Racing BMS banner, to return to the FIA GT Championship as Aston Martin's representative. Former FIA GT champion Fabrizio Gollin was partnered with Fabio Babini, while former Le Mans Series champions Pescatori and Ramos shared the second Aston Martin. A trio of new Aston Martin DBRS9s were also entered by the team in the new FIA GT3 European Championship for amateur drivers.

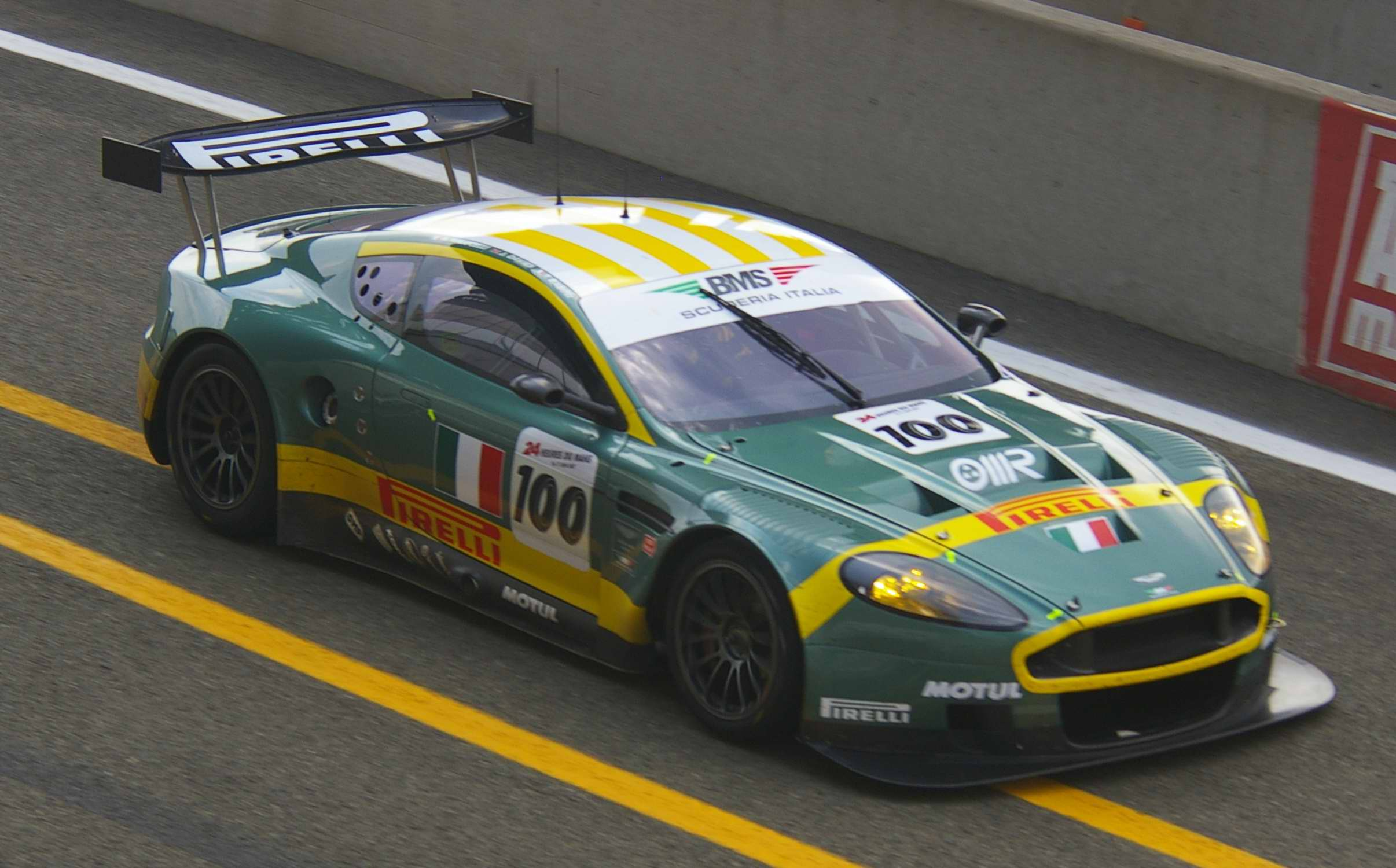
One of the team's Aston Martin DBR9s, here entered in the 2007 24 Hours of Le Mans

The squad however did not return to the FIA GT Championship in the same fashion in which they had left it in 2004. The team was unable to score any victories, and in fact was unable to finish any better than third on multiple occasions. However, even though the team lacked victories, they were able to consistently score points, enough to finish second in the teams' championship. Fabio Babini was the team's highest scoring driving, earning ninth in the drivers' championship. The team's 24 Hours of Le Mans entry was also short-lived as their lone Aston Martin crashed heavily after only three laps. BMS Scuderia Italia's FIA GT3 effort earned a single win for fourth place in the teams' championship.

For the 2007 season, BMS Scuderia Italia remained Aston Martin's primary team in the FIA GT Championship, but the team also purchased a Porsche 997 GT3-RSR for the series' lower GT2 class. Porsche factory driver Emmanuel Collard drove alongside Matteo Malucelli, earning a class win at the Spa 24 Hours and finishing the season second in the GT2 Teams Championship. The primary GT1 team however struggled throughout the year, earning no victories and earning sixth in the Teams Championship. The team's DBR9 however was able to have a strong performance at the 24 Hours of Le Mans by finishing eleventh overall and sixth in GT1. In FIA GT3, the DBRS9 won the final event of the year and the team secured third place in the Teams Championship.

Following the 2007 season, Aston Martin and Prodrive's changing efforts in GT1 led BMS Scuderia Italia to end their partnership as a factory team. However, BMS Scuderia Italia's private efforts with Aston Martins in the FIA GT3 European Championship remain as the team has resurrected the Brixia Racing name. Drivers Marcello Zani and Matteo Malucelli founded the team to concentrate solely on not just the FIA GT3 series, but also the smaller national Italian GT Championship with the company's Aston Martin DBRS9s.

In FIA GT, BMS Scuderia Italia has moved on from both Aston Martin and Porsche, as the team purchased two Ferrari F430s for the GT2 Championship. Paolo Ruberti and Matteo Malucelli share the team's #77 entry, while Davide Rigon is partnered with Joël Camathias in the #78. The team also entered one of their Ferraris in the 2008 and 2009 24 Hours of Le Mans races finishing second in the GT2 class in both those years' races, aided by the return of Fabio Babini.

== Results summary ==
Year	Championship	Car	Races	Wins	Poles	Fastest laps	Drivers Championship	Teams Championship
1983	Italian Rally Championship	Alfa Romeo GTV6	?	?	N/A	N/A	?	?
1984	Italian Rally Championship	Alfa Romeo GTV6	?	?	N/A	N/A	?	?
1985	Italian Rally Championship	Lancia 037	?	3	N/A	N/A	?	?
1986	Italian Rally Championship	Lancia 037; Lancia Delta S4	?	4	N/A	N/A	3rd (Bossini)	?
1987	Italian Rally Championship	Alfa Romeo 75 Turbo	?	?	N/A	N/A	?	?
1987	World Touring Car Championship	Alfa Romeo 75 Turbo	7	0	0	0	Withdrew	Withdrew
1988	Formula One World Championship	Dallara 3087-Ford; Dallara F188-Ford	14	0	0	0	Not Classified	Not Classified
1989	Formula One World Championship	Dallara F189-Ford	15	0	0	0	17th (de Cesaris)	8th
1990	Formula One World Championship	Dallara F190-Ford	16	0	0	0	Not Classified	Not Classified
1991	Formula One World Championship	Dallara F191-Judd	16	0	0	0	12th (Lehto)	8th
1992	Formula One World Championship	Dallara F192-Ferrari	16	0	0	0	16th (Martini)	10th
1993	Formula One World Championship	Lola T93/30-Ferrari	14	0	0	0	Not Classified	Not Classified
1994	Super Tourenwagen Cup	Nissan Primera	8	0	0	?	6th (Bartels)	?
1995	Super Tourenwagen Cup	Nissan Primera	12	1	1	?	10th (O'Dor)	?
1996	Super Tourenwagen Cup	Nissan Primera	16	0	0	?	16th (Maassen)	?
1997	FIA GT Championship	Porsche 911 GT1	8	0	0	0	33rd (Pescatori & Martini)	9th
1998	Italian Superturismo Championship	Alfa Romeo 155	20	0	?	?	4th (Pescatori)	?
1999	Sports Racing World Cup	Ferrari 333 SP	9	1	2	1	3rd (Pescatori & Moncini)	2nd
2000	Sports Racing World Cup	Ferrari 333 SP	8	1	0	0	3rd (M. Zadra & Peter)	2nd
2001	FIA Sportscar Championship	Ferrari 333 SP	8	2	2	2	1st (M. Zadra)	1st
2002	FIA GT Championship	Ferrari 550-GTS Maranello	10	4	5	6	5th (Délétraz & Piccini)	4th
2003	FIA GT Championship	Ferrari 550-GTS Maranello	10	8	2	2	1st (Bobbi & Biagi)	1st
2004	FIA GT Championship	Ferrari 550-GTS Maranello	11	5	5	2	1st (Gollin & Cappellari)	1st
2005	Le Mans Endurance Series	Ferrari 550-GTS Maranello	5	3	2	?	1st (Bartyan, Pescatori, & Seiler)	1st
2005	Italian GT Championship (GT1)	Ferrari 550-GTS Maranello	7	5	6	3	1st (Malucelli & Ramos)	1st
2005	Italian GT Championship (GT2)	Ferrari 360 Modena GTC	7	2	1	?	3rd (Pescatori & Bartyan)	?
2006	FIA GT Championship	Aston Martin DBR9	10	0	0	1	9th (Babini)	2nd
2006	FIA GT3 European Championship	Aston Martin DBRS9	10	1	2	0	6th (Seiler & Groppi)	4th
2006	International GT Open	Aston Martin DBRS9	4	0	0	?	?	?
2007	FIA GT Championship (GT1)	Aston Martin DBR9	10	0	0	0	13th (Babini & Davies)	6th
2007	FIA GT Championship (GT2)	Porsche 997 GT3-RSR	10	1	1	?	5th (Collard & Malucelli)	2nd
2007	FIA GT3 European Championship	Aston Martin DBRS9	10	1	0	1	6th (Alessi & Frassinetti)	3rd
2007	Italian GT Championship	Aston Martin DBRS9	?	?	?	?	?	?

=== Complete Formula One results ===
(key) (results in bold indicate pole position)

Year	Chassis	Engine(s)	Tyres	Drivers	1	2	3	4	5	6	7	8	9	10	11	12	13	14	15	16	Points	WCC
1988	Dallara 3087	Ford DFV 3.0 V8	G		BRA	SMR	MON	MEX	CAN	DET	FRA	GBR	GER	HUN	BEL	ITA	POR	ESP	JPN	AUS	0	NC
1988	Dallara 3087	Ford DFV 3.0 V8	G	(Italy) Alex Caffi	DNPQ																0	NC
1988	Dallara F188	Ford DFZ 3.5 V8	G	(Italy) Alex Caffi		Ret	Ret	Ret	DNPQ	8	12	11	15	Ret	8	Ret	7	10	Ret	Ret	0	NC
1989	Dallara F189	Ford DFR 3.5 V8	P		BRA	SMR	MON	MEX	USA	CAN	FRA	GBR	GER	HUN	BEL	ITA	POR	ESP	JPN	AUS	8	8th
1989	Dallara F189	Ford DFR 3.5 V8	P	(Italy) Alex Caffi	DNPQ	7	4	13	Ret	6	Ret	DNPQ	Ret	7	Ret	11	Ret	Ret	9	Ret	8	8th
1989	Dallara F189	Ford DFR 3.5 V8	P	(Italy) Andrea de Cesaris	13	10	13	Ret	8	3	DNQ	Ret	7	Ret	11	Ret	Ret	7	10	Ret	8	8th
1990	Dallara F190	Ford DFR 3.5 V8	P		USA	BRA	SMR	MON	CAN	MEX	FRA	GBR	GER	HUN	BEL	ITA	POR	ESP	JPN	AUS	0	NC
1990	Dallara F190	Ford DFR 3.5 V8	P	(Italy) Emanuele Pirro			Ret	Ret	Ret	Ret	Ret	11	Ret	10	Ret	Ret	15	Ret	Ret	Ret	0	NC
1990	Dallara F190	Ford DFR 3.5 V8	P	(Italy) Andrea de Cesaris	Ret	Ret	Ret	Ret	Ret	13	DSQ	Ret	DNQ	Ret	Ret	10	Ret	Ret	Ret	Ret	0	NC
1990	Dallara F190	Ford DFR 3.5 V8	P	(Italy) Gianni Morbidelli	DNQ	14															0	NC
1991	Dallara F191	Judd GV 3.5 V10	P		USA	BRA	SMR	MON	CAN	MEX	FRA	GBR	GER	HUN	BEL	ITA	POR	ESP	JPN	AUS	5	8th
1991	Dallara F191	Judd GV 3.5 V10	P	(Italy) Emanuele Pirro	Ret	11	DNPQ	6	9	DNPQ	DNQ	10	10	Ret	8	10	Ret	15	Ret	7	5	8th
1991	Dallara F191	Judd GV 3.5 V10	P	(Finland) JJ Lehto	Ret	Ret	3	11	Ret	Ret	Ret	13	Ret	Ret	Ret	Ret	Ret	8	Ret	12	5	8th
1992	Dallara F192	Ferrari 037 3.5 V12	G		RSA	MEX	BRA	ESP	SMR	MON	CAN	FRA	GBR	GER	HUN	BEL	ITA	POR	JPN	AUS	2	10th
1992	Dallara F192	Ferrari 037 3.5 V12	G	(Finland) JJ Lehto	Ret	8	8	Ret	11	9	9	9	13	10	DNQ	7	11	Ret	9	Ret	2	10th
1992	Dallara F192	Ferrari 037 3.5 V12	G	(Italy) Pierluigi Martini	Ret	Ret	Ret	6	6	Ret	8	10	15	11	Ret	Ret	8	Ret	10	Ret	2	10th
1993	Lola T93/30	Ferrari 040 3.5 V12	G		RSA	BRA	EUR	SMR	ESP	MON	CAN	FRA	GBR	GER	HUN	BEL	ITA	POR	JPN	AUS	0	NC
1993	Lola T93/30	Ferrari 040 3.5 V12	G	(Italy) Michele Alboreto	Ret	11	11	DNQ	DNQ	Ret	DNQ	DNQ	DNQ	16	Ret	14	Ret	Ret			0	NC
1993	Lola T93/30	Ferrari 040 3.5 V12	G	(Italy) Luca Badoer	Ret	12	DNQ	7	Ret	DNQ	15	Ret	Ret	Ret	Ret	13	10	14			0	NC

=== 24 Hours of Le Mans results ===
Year	Entrant	No.	Car	Drivers	Class	Laps	Pos.	Class Pos.
1997	(Italy) BMS Scuderia Italia	27	Porsche 911 GT1	(Brazil) Antônio Hermann de Azevedo (Italy) Pierluigi Martini (Italy) Christian Pescatori	LMGT1	317	8th	4th
2005	(Italy) BMS Scuderia Italia	51	Ferrari 550-GTS Maranello	(Italy) Fabrizio Gollin (Italy) Christian Pescatori (Portugal) Miguel Ramos	LMGT1	67	DNF	DNF
2005	(Italy) BMS Scuderia Italia	52	Ferrari 550-GTS Maranello	(Italy) Michele Bartyan (Italy) Matteo Malucelli (Switzerland) Toni Seiler	LMGT1	60	DNF	DNF
2006	(Italy) BMS Scuderia Italia	69	Aston Martin DBR9	(Italy) Fabio Babini (Italy) Fabrizio Gollin (Italy) Christian Pescatori	LMGT1	3	DNF	DNF
2007	(Italy) Aston Martin Racing BMS	100	Aston Martin DBR9	(Italy) Fabio Babini (United Kingdom) Jamie Davies (Italy) Matteo Malucelli	LMGT1	336	11th	6th
2008	(Italy) BMS Scuderia Italia	97	Ferrari F430 GT2	(Italy) Fabio Babini (Italy) Matteo Malucelli (Italy) Paolo Ruberti	LMGT2	318	22nd	**2nd**
2009	(Italy) BMS Scuderia Italia	97	Ferrari F430 GT2	(Italy) Fabio Babini (Italy) Matteo Malucelli (Italy) Paolo Ruberti	LMGT2	327	19th	**2nd**
2010	(Italy) BMS Scuderia Italia SpA	97	Porsche 997 GT3-RSR	(Germany) Marco Holzer (Germany) Timo Scheider (United Kingdom) Richard Westbrook	LMGT2	327	14th	**3rd**
