= Wolf WD1 =

Can-Am cars

- Category: Can-Am
- Constructor: Dallara
- Designer: Giampaolo Dallara
- Successor: Emiliani 380

Technical specifications
- Chassis: Aluminum monocoque
- Engine: Chevrolet 5,000 cc (305.1 cu in) V8 engine naturally-aspirated mid-engined
- Transmission: Hewland FT-200 5-speed manual
- Power: 550 hp (410 kW)

Competition history
- Notable entrants: Walter Wolf Racing
- Notable drivers: Chris Amon; Gilles Villeneuve
- Debut: 1977 Can-Am St. Jovite
Races	Podiums
6	1

The Wolf WD1, also known as the Wolf-Dallara WD1, was a sports prototype race car, designed, developed, and built by British-Canadian constructor, Walter Wolf Racing, in partnership with Italian manufacturer, constructor, and design company, Dallara. It was designed to compete in the revived Can-Am series, in 1977. It was driven by Chris Amon and Gilles Villeneuve. Its best result was a 3rd-place podium finish, at Road America in 1977; being driven by Villeneuve. As with most Can-Am cars of the time, it was powered by the commonly used 5.0 L (310 cu in) Chevrolet small-block engine tuned by Falconer & Dunn. To meet the Can-Am regulations, it was a sports car design with fully enclosed wheels, but the single seat was along the centerline.

After competing in the Can-Am series, it was later converted to an open-wheel Formula 3 car in 1978, and was raced by Bobby Rahal in the European F3 series in 1978. The F3 version was powered by a naturally-aspirated 2.0 L (120 cu in) Novamotor 2T-G four-cylinder engine, producing 170 PS (125 kW; 168 bhp), and 233 N⋅m (172 lb⋅ft) of torque.
