= Dallara F191 =

Formula One racing car

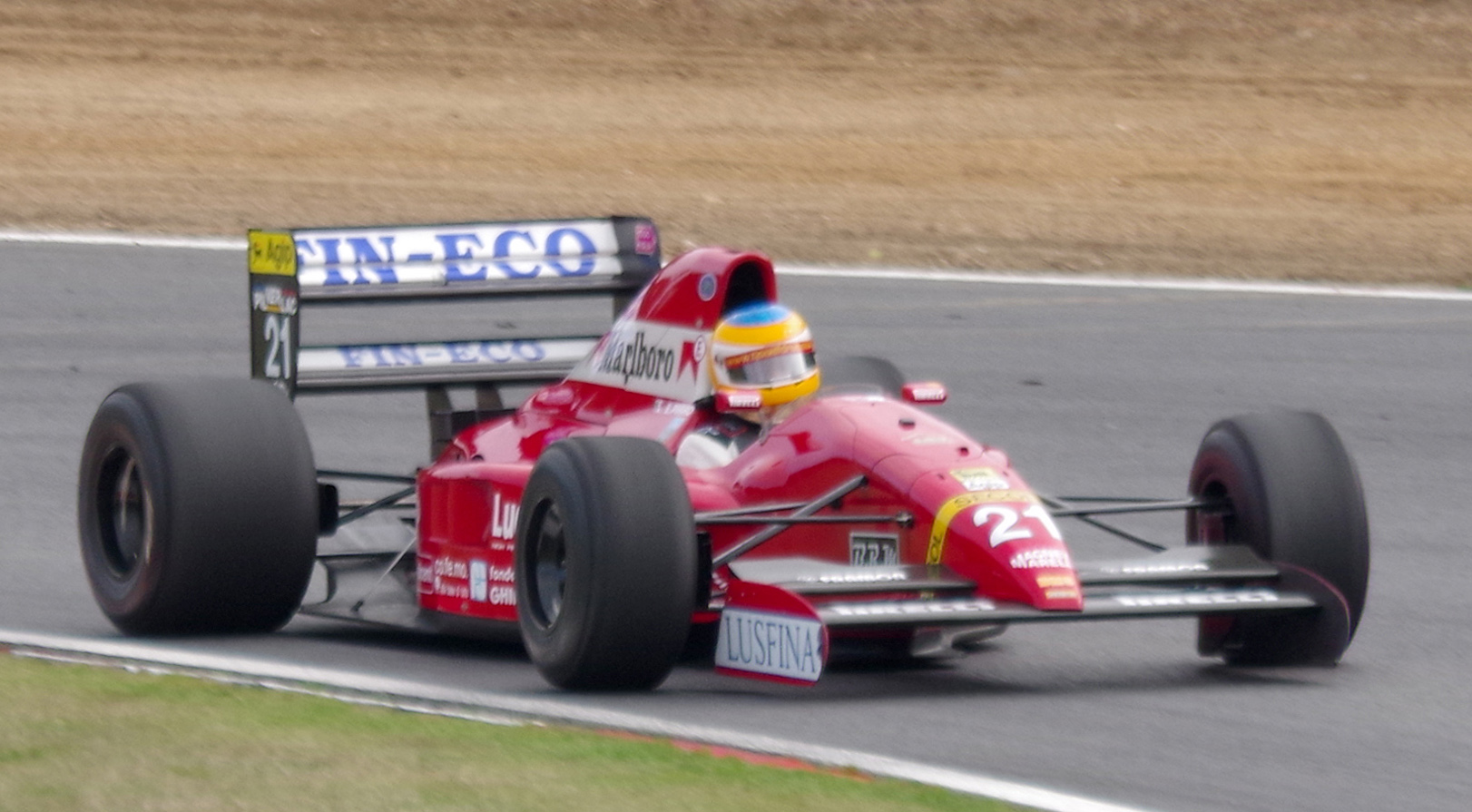
- Emanuele Pirro's Dallara 191-Judd
- Category: Formula One
- Constructor: Dallara
- Designers: Giampaolo Dallara (Technical Director); Nigel Cowperthwaite (Chief Designer)
- Predecessor: F190
- Successor: F192

Technical specifications
- Chassis: Carbon Fibre Monocoque
- Axle track: Front: 1,805 mm (71.1 in); Rear: 1,675 mm (65.9 in)
- Wheelbase: 2,950 mm (116.1 in)
- Engine: Judd GV 3,496 cc (213.3 cu in), V10, NA, mid-engine, longitudinally-mounted
- Transmission: Dallara/Hewland 6-speed
- Power: 660-750 hp @ 13,500 rpm
- Weight: 505kg
- Fuel: Agip
- Tyres: Pirelli

Competition history
- Notable entrants: BMS Scuderia Italia
- Notable drivers: 21. (Italy) Emanuele Pirro; 22. (Finland) JJ Lehto
- Debut: 1991 United States Grand Prix
Races	Wins	Podiums	Poles	F/Laps
16	0	1	0	0

The Dallara F191 was a Formula One car designed by Giampaolo Dallara and Nigel Cowperthwaite for use by the BMS Scuderia Italia team during the 1991 Formula One season. The car was powered by the Judd V10 engine and ran on Pirelli tyres. Its best finish was at the San Marino Grand Prix when JJ Lehto drove it to third place.

== Design and development ==
The Dallara F191 car was designed for the BMS Scuderia Italia team by Giampaolo Dallara and Nigel Cowperthwaite and was an entirely new albeit conventional car rather than simply a development of the previous year's car. The Cosworth DFR from 1990 was discarded and instead an exclusive supply of Judd V10 engines was sourced from Engine Developments Limited. The new engine, which weighed 137 kilograms (302 lb) and was thus similar to the Ilmor 2175 V10 used by fellow Formula 1 team, Leyton House, was developed by John Judd and generated plenty of power. At the start of the year it was achieving 660 bhp and by the end of the season it was putting out over 700 bhp.

The car's monocoque chassis was of carbon fibre and provided with a six-speed transverse gearbox developed by Dallara. The F191 was configured with double wishbone pushrod suspension having inboard dampers. Brakes were by Brembo with Carbone Industrie pads. The steering was designed in house by Dallara and the car ran on Pirelli tyres. These proved to be quite variable, with grip deteriorating inconsistently across a race distance. The wheelbase of the chassis was 2,950 millimetres (116.1 in), the front track was 1,805 millimetres (71.1 in) while the rear track was 1,675 millimetres (65.9 in). The capacity of the fuel tank was 210 litres (46.2 imp gal) and fuel and oil was supplied by Agip. The overall weight of the car was 505 kilograms (1,113.3 lb). Like the cars of most other teams, the F191 had a high nose configuration.

The F191 was presented in a red colour, with a white band running horizontally along the engine cover. It carried sponsorship from cigarette brand Marlboro, Fin-Eco, the fuel concern Agip and Lucchini's own steel manufacturing concern.

== Race history ==
The Scuderia Italia drivers for 1991 were Emanuele Pirro, who had driven for the team the previous year, and JJ Lehto. During pre-season testing at the Paul Ricard circuit in France, Lehto crashed the F191 heavily. This was believed to be caused by an issue with the rear brakes. Scuderia Italia's failure to score any points the previous year, together with the number of teams attempting to qualify for races in the current season, meant that for the first half of the year, both drivers were forced to pre-qualify.

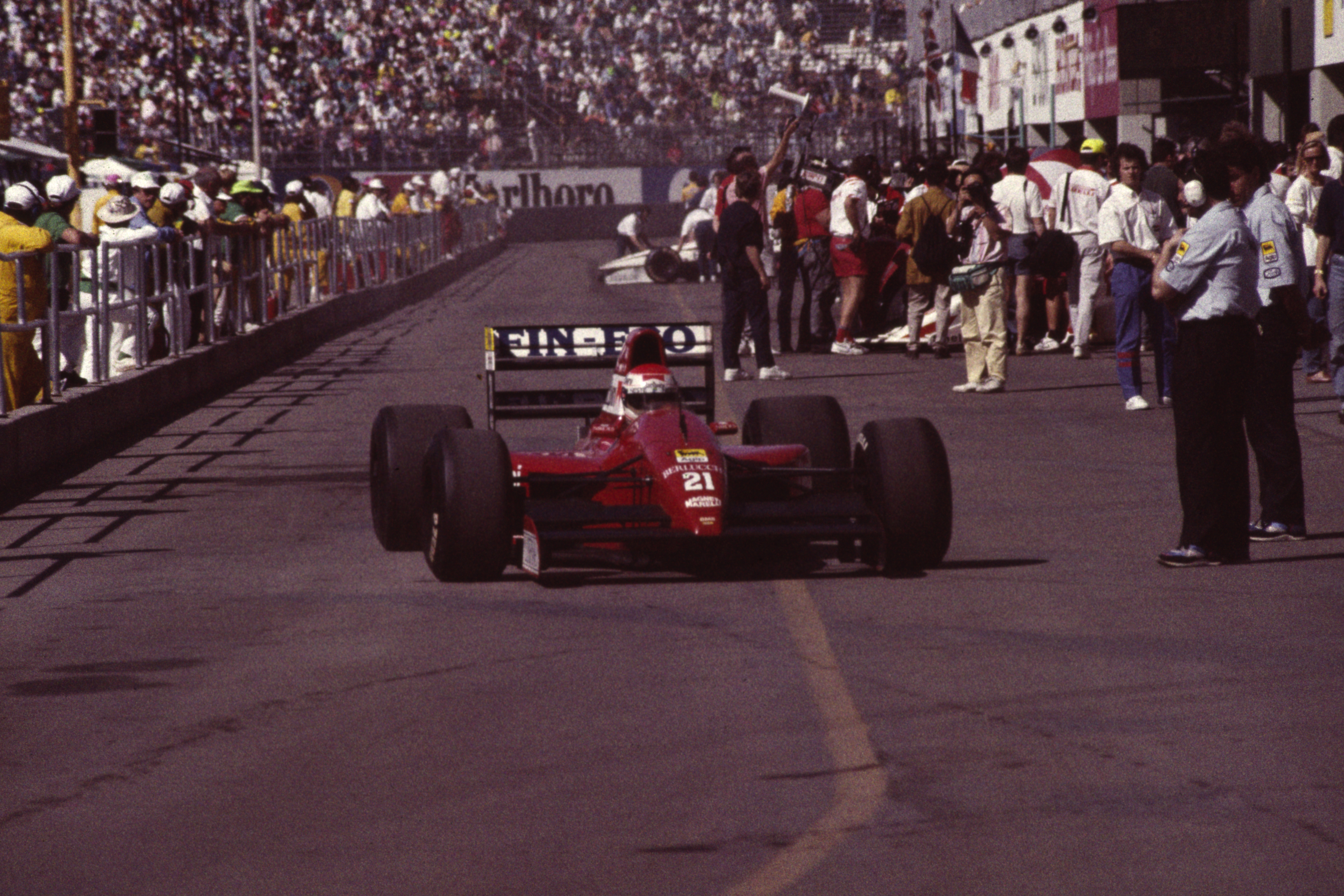
Emanuele Pirro in the F191 at the 1991 United States Grand Prix

In pre-qualifying for the season-opening race in the United States, Pirro and Lehto were first and second fastest respectively, and then qualified 9th and 10th. In the race itself, Lehto retired on lap 13 due to clutch problems. Pirro was running in 10th place when he retired four laps later with gearbox issues. Lehto was the fastest pre-qualifier at the Brazilian Grand Prix but placed 19th on the grid. Pirro was 4th fastest in pre-qualifying and 12th on the grid. He went onto finish in 11th in the race after a start line incident. Lehto retired from 13th place on lap 23 with an alternator failure.

At the San Marino Grand Prix, Pirro failed to pre-qualify but Lehto passed through, placing 16th on the grid for the race itself. In the damp conditions in which the race started, Lehto quickly moved through the field to 6th place by lap 22 and was 3rd at the conclusion of the event. It was only the second time in the team's history that a Scuderia Italia driver had finished on the podium. Both Scuderia Italia drivers easily passed through pre-qualifying at the race in Monaco, and placed 12th and 13th on the grid, Lehto ahead of Pirro. The former made a good start in the race and by lap 43 was holding 6th place but then had gearbox issues that saw him drop back to 11th at the end of the race. Pirro had a steady run and finished in 6th place for one point.

Pirro and Lehto, having been the best of the pre-qualifiers for the Canadian Grand Prix, started the race from 10th and 17th respectively. After a collision with Andrea de Cesaris's Jordan 191 on lap 1, Pirro had handling issues for the remainder of the race and eventually placed 9th. Lehto ran as high as 4th, but retired on lap 51 with engine failure. In Mexico, Pirro did not pre-qualify for the race and while Lehto did, and started from 16th, he retired halfway through with another engine failure. At the French Grand Prix, Pirro again failed to pre-qualify. Lehto was second fastest in pre-qualifying but was in last place on the grid for the race. Gaining six places at the start of the race, he retired on lap 40 when his tyre broke up.

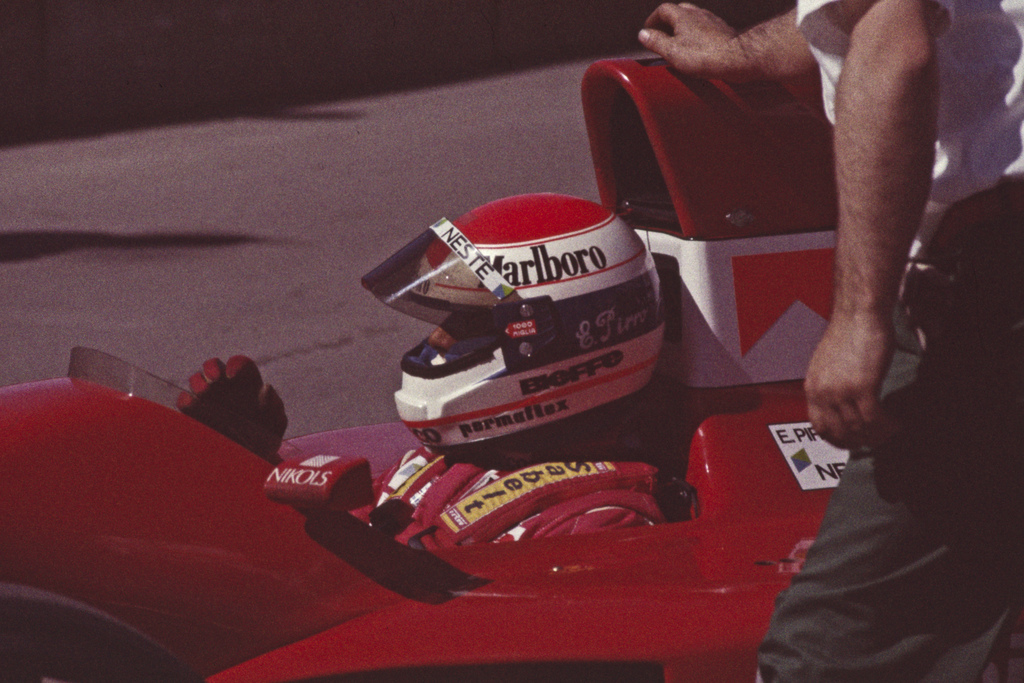
Pirro in the cockpit of the F191

The British Grand Prix was the final time that Lehto and Pirro had to pre-qualify; the points earned from the San Marino and Monaco races meant that from the next race, in Germany, the pair had direct entry to qualifying. Both drivers went through pre-qualifying, Lehto as the fastest. They qualified 11th (Lehto) and 18th (Pirro). The latter was involved in a minor start line incident with Bertrand Gachot in the Jordan, but went on to finish 10th. Lehto was 13th after being delayed with electrical problems. In Germany, the pair qualified 18th and 20th, Pirro ahead of Lehto. The former finished the race in 10th while Lehto retired with engine issues.

For the Hungarian Grand Prix, Pirro qualified in 7th while Lehto was in 12th. Pirro collided with Stefano Modena's Tyrrell 020 at the race start, damaging the suspension of his F191. He raced at the rear of the field until retiring on lap 38 with low oil pressure. Lehto retired from 16th several laps later, having run as high as 7th before being slowed with various problems. Lehto qualified 14th for the Belgian Grand Prix, while Pirro was further back in 25th. He finished in 8th but Lehto retired with engine problems. At the team's home race in Italy, Pirro qualified 16th and finished 10th. Lehto started from 20th and had progressed to 12th place by lap 35 when he got a puncture. He attempted to drive the car to the pits but the suspension was damaged by the flailing tyre and he retired.

Both drivers retired from the Portuguese Grand Prix, having started the event from 17th (Pirro) and 18th (Lehto) on the grid. In Lehto's case, this was due to his gear selection lever being inadequately secured by a mechanic and working itself loose during the race. In the next race, in Spain, Pirro qualified in 9th and Lehto in 15th. Pirro collided with Ivan Capelli's Leyton House CG911 on lap 2 but recovered after some remedial work in the pits to place 15th. Lehto also had a mid-race collision, with the Brabham BT60 of Martin Brundle, on lap 18 but got away lightly and finished 8th. He had run as high as 5th until he stopped for fresh tyres. On lap 2 of the Japanese race, after Pirro and Lehto qualified 12th and 16th, both drivers were eliminated in a crash with de Cesaris. In the season-ending race in Australia, which was afflicted with heavy rain and only ran for 14 laps, Lehto qualified in 11th with Pirro two places back on the grid. The latter finished in 7th, less than two seconds behind the 6th-placed Gianni Morbidelli in the Ferrari 643. Lehto was in 12th place when the race ended.

Lehto, with his four points from his 3rd place finish in San Marino placed equal 12th in the 1991 Driver's Championship. Pirro's single point saw him placed equal 18th. The team's five points saw Scuderia Italia finish 8th in the Constructor's Championship.

== Complete Formula One results ==
(key) (results in bold indicate pole position; results in italics indicate fastest lap)

Year	Chassis	Engine(s)	Tyres	Drivers	1	2	3	4	5	6	7	8	9	10	11	12	13	14	15	16	Points	WCC
1991	Dallara F191	Judd V10 GV	**P**		USA	BRA	SMR	MON	CAN	MEX	FRA	GBR	GER	HUN	BEL	ITA	POR	ESP	JPN	AUS	**5**	**8th**
1991	Dallara F191	Judd V10 GV	**P**	Emanuele Pirro	Ret	11	DNPQ	6	9	DNPQ	DNPQ	10	10	Ret	8	10	Ret	15	Ret	7	**5**	**8th**
1991	Dallara F191	Judd V10 GV	**P**	JJ Lehto	Ret	Ret	3	11	Ret	Ret	Ret	13	Ret	Ret	Ret	Ret	Ret	8	Ret	12	**5**	**8th**
