= 1991 United States Grand Prix =

Coordinates: 33°26′53″N 112°04′29″W

- Race 1 of 16 in the 1991 Formula One World Championship

Race details
- Date: March 10, 1991
- Official name: XXVIII Iceberg United States Grand Prix
- Location: Phoenix Street Circuit; Phoenix, Arizona
- Course: Temporary road course
- Course length: 3.721 km (2.312 miles)
- Distance: 81 laps, 301.401 km (187.272 miles)
- Scheduled distance: 82 laps, 305.122 km (189.584 miles)
- Weather: Overcast; 25 °C (77 °F)

Pole position
Driver	(Brazil) Ayrton Senna	McLaren-Honda
- Time: 1:21.434

Fastest lap
Driver	(France) Jean Alesi	Ferrari
- Time: 1:26.758 on lap 49

Podium
First	(Brazil) Ayrton Senna	McLaren-Honda
Second	(France) Alain Prost	Ferrari
Third	(Brazil) Nelson Piquet	Benetton-Ford

The 1991 United States Grand Prix (formally the XXVIII Iceberg United States Grand Prix) was a Formula One motor race held on March 10, 1991 in Phoenix, Arizona. It was the first race of the 1991 Formula One World Championship. The 81-lap race was won from pole position by Ayrton Senna, driving a McLaren-Honda, with Alain Prost second in a Ferrari and Nelson Piquet third in a Benetton-Ford.

The race marked the respective debuts of future double World Champion Mika Häkkinen and the Jordan team. It was also the first F1 World Championship race in which ten points were awarded for a win rather than nine, as part of a revised scoring system introduced for 1991. However, it was also to be the last United States Grand Prix until 2000, due to poor attendances.

In the two previous years, the championship had been decided when Senna and Prost tangled at Suzuka. In 1989, their collision as team-mates secured Prost's third World Championship; in 1990, with Prost driving for Ferrari and still in title contention, it handed Senna his second crown. Controversy regarding the nature of the 1990 incident had created great anticipation for the rematch.

== Qualifying ==
=== Pre-qualifying report ===
Several teams were required to participate in the Friday morning pre-qualifying sessions during 1991, in order to reduce the field to thirty cars for the main qualifying sessions on Friday afternoon and Saturday. At the midway point of the season, the pre-qualifying group was to be reassessed, with the more successful teams (over a twelve-month period consisting of the second half of 1990 and the first half of 1991) being allowed to avoid pre-qualifying thereafter, and less successful teams being required to pre-qualify from mid-season onwards.

Eight cars were to take part in pre-qualifying sessions during the first half of the 1991 season, after 1990 ended with no pre-qualifying sessions at the last two Grands Prix, due to the withdrawal of the EuroBrun and Life teams. Pre-qualifying was necessary again in 1991 due to the arrival of two new entrants: Jordan and Modena, which were entirely new teams, running two cars each. Another new name, Fondmetal, was essentially a continuation of the defunct Osella team and was running a single car. Also involved in pre-qualifying were Coloni, running one car, and Scuderia Italia, running two cars. These were the two least successful surviving teams over the past two half seasons. The fastest four cars would go through to the main qualifying sessions.

Jordan had signed veteran Italian driver Andrea de Cesaris, plus last season's Coloni driver Bertrand Gachot, who had much experience in pre-qualifying sessions. Their car was the all-new 191 powered by a Cosworth V8 engine. Modena's drivers were Italian Nicola Larini, another driver well used to pre-qualifying, and Belgian debutant Eric van de Poele. They would be driving the Lamborghini V12-engined Lambo 291, so named for the team's strong Lamborghini connections. Fondmetal had retained the French Osella driver Olivier Grouillard, and were starting the season with the Cosworth V8-powered Fondmetal FA1M-E, effectively last year's Osella, which itself was an update of their 1989 car. Coloni had brought the C4, a modified version of the C3 used in 1989 and 1990, which also had a Cosworth V8 engine. Their driver was the 1990 British Formula 3000 champion Pedro Chaves, from Portugal. Scuderia Italia were campaigning a Dallara chassis as usual, the all-new F191, powered by Judd V10 engines. The team retained Italian Emanuele Pirro, and hired Finnish driver JJ Lehto, who had driven for Onyx in 1990.

In pre-qualifying in Phoenix, the Dallaras were easily the fastest cars in the session, with Pirro half a second faster than Lehto. Nearly two seconds slower in third was Larini in the Modena Lambo, and the fourth pre-qualifier was Gachot in the Jordan. Missing out in fifth place was de Cesaris in the other Jordan, who made a gear selection error on a faster lap, just ahead of Chaves, who crashed the Coloni during the session. Grouillard was seventh in the Fondmetal, complaining of a lack of grip, but bottom of the time sheets, nearly five seconds adrift of Grouillard, was van de Poele in the other Lambo. The Belgian had encountered a protester on the track during one run, after which his engine failed.

=== Pre-qualifying classification ===
Pos	No	Driver	Constructor	Time	Gap
1	21	(Italy) Emanuele Pirro	Dallara-Judd	1:28.288	
2	22	(Finland) JJ Lehto	Dallara-Judd	1:28.792	+0.504
3	34	(Italy) Nicola Larini	Lambo-Lamborghini	1:30.244	+1.956
4	32	(Belgium) Bertrand Gachot	Jordan-Ford	1:30.304	+2.016
5	33	(Italy) Andrea de Cesaris	Jordan-Ford	1:30.937	+2.649
6	31	(Portugal) Pedro Chaves	Coloni-Ford	1:31.113	+2.825
7	14	(France) Olivier Grouillard	Fondmetal-Ford	1:32.126	+3.838
8	35	(Belgium) Eric van de Poele	Lambo-Lamborghini	1:37.046	+8.758

=== Qualifying report ===
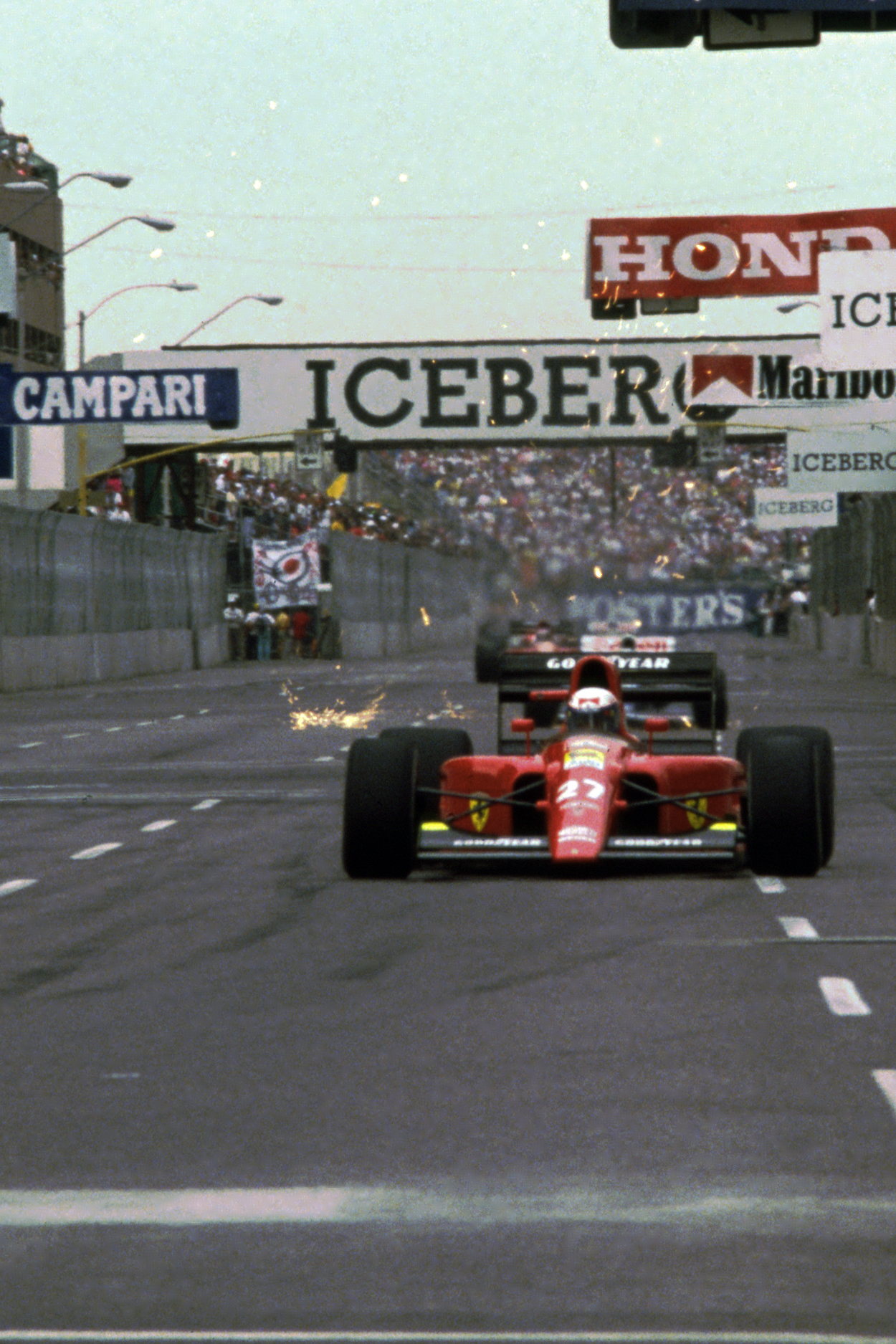
Alain Prost in his Ferrari 642 on the opening lap.

Prior to arriving in Phoenix, the 1991 McLaren chassis had had only had one brief test session, and the two race cars were completed about 4 am Friday, six hours before the first practice session. Working to prepare the new car, Ayrton Senna claimed he had never gotten totally comfortable with the increasing complexity of the sport since helping Lotus introduce the first active suspension car in 1987, and he still found it hard to embrace the huge role of computers in achieving a proper setup. "Friday, to understand and interpret things properly, I worked with the engineers into the evening," Senna said. "It has been a long time since I did that. The engineers and I talked our way around the circuit, then we compared this with what the computer predicted. It was great because the computer confirmed almost everything, and it also showed where there was room for improvement."

The Ferraris of Alain Prost and Jean Alesi were expected to be the strongest team, but their V-12s and 7-speed semi-automatic gearboxes were not well suited to the tight turns and short straights of the street circuit. As it turned out, they were not the only ones plagued by gearbox problems throughout the race. To add insult to injury, Alesi, who had clinched the fastest time on Friday, ended his qualifying session clipping the tire barrier with his rear right wheel, ensuring he would qualify no higher than fifth place.

=== Qualifying classification ===
Pos	No	Driver	Constructor	Q1	Q2	Gap
1	1	(Brazil) Ayrton Senna	McLaren-Honda	1:23.530	1:21.434	
2	27	(France) Alain Prost	Ferrari	1:24.507	1:22.555	+1.121
3	6	(Italy) Riccardo Patrese	Williams-Renault	1:24.726	1:22.833	+1.399
4	5	(United Kingdom) Nigel Mansell	Williams-Renault	1:25.277	1:23.218	+1.784
5	20	(Brazil) Nelson Piquet	Benetton-Ford	1:25.026	1:23.384	+1.950
6	28	(France) Jean Alesi	Ferrari	1:23.519	1:23.805	+2.085
7	2	(Austria) Gerhard Berger	McLaren-Honda	1:25.914	1:23.742	+2.308
8	19	(Brazil) Roberto Moreno	Benetton-Ford	1:25.170	1:23.881	+2.447
9	21	(Italy) Emanuele Pirro	Dallara-Judd	1:24.876	1:24.792	+3.358
10	22	(Finland) JJ Lehto	Dallara-Judd	1:26.765	1:24.891	+3.457
11	4	(Italy) Stefano Modena	Tyrrell-Honda	1:25.065	1:25.557	+3.631
12	7	(United Kingdom) Martin Brundle	Brabham-Yamaha	1:27.184	1:25.385	+3.951
13	11	(Finland) Mika Häkkinen	Lotus-Judd	1:27.976	1:25.448	+4.014
14	32	(Belgium) Bertrand Gachot	Jordan-Ford	1:27.568	1:25.701	+4.267
15	23	(Italy) Pierluigi Martini	Minardi-Ferrari	1:25.815	1:25.715	+4.281
16	3	(Japan) Satoru Nakajima	Tyrrell-Honda	1:26.058	1:25.752	+4.318
17	34	(Italy) Nicola Larini	Lambo-Lamborghini	1:27.761	1:25.791	+4.357
18	16	(Italy) Ivan Capelli	Leyton House-Ilmor	1:54.845	1:26.121	+4.687
19	29	(France) Éric Bernard	Lola-Ford	1:27.446	1:26.425	+4.991
20	25	(Belgium) Thierry Boutsen	Ligier-Lamborghini	1:27.984	1:26.500	+5.066
21	30	(Japan) Aguri Suzuki	Lola-Ford	1:26.987	1:26.548	+5.114
22	17	(Italy) Gabriele Tarquini	AGS-Ford	1:27.164	1:26.851	+5.417
23	15	(Brazil) Maurício Gugelmin	Leyton House-Ilmor	1:26.865	1:26.875	+5.431
24	8	(United Kingdom) Mark Blundell	Brabham-Yamaha	1:30.061	1:26.915	+5.481
25	9	(Italy) Michele Alboreto	Footwork-Porsche	1:29.067	1:27.015	+5.581
26	24	(Italy) Gianni Morbidelli	Minardi-Ferrari	1:27.625	1:27.042	+5.608
27	26	(France) Érik Comas	Ligier-Lamborghini	1:28.904	1:27.159	+5.725
28	10	(Italy) Alex Caffi	Footwork-Porsche	1:29.388	1:27.519	+6.085
29	18	(Sweden) Stefan Johansson	AGS-Ford	1:29.857	1:27.753	+6.319
30	12	(United Kingdom) Julian Bailey	Lotus-Judd	1:30.758	1:28.570	+7.136

== Race ==
=== Race report ===
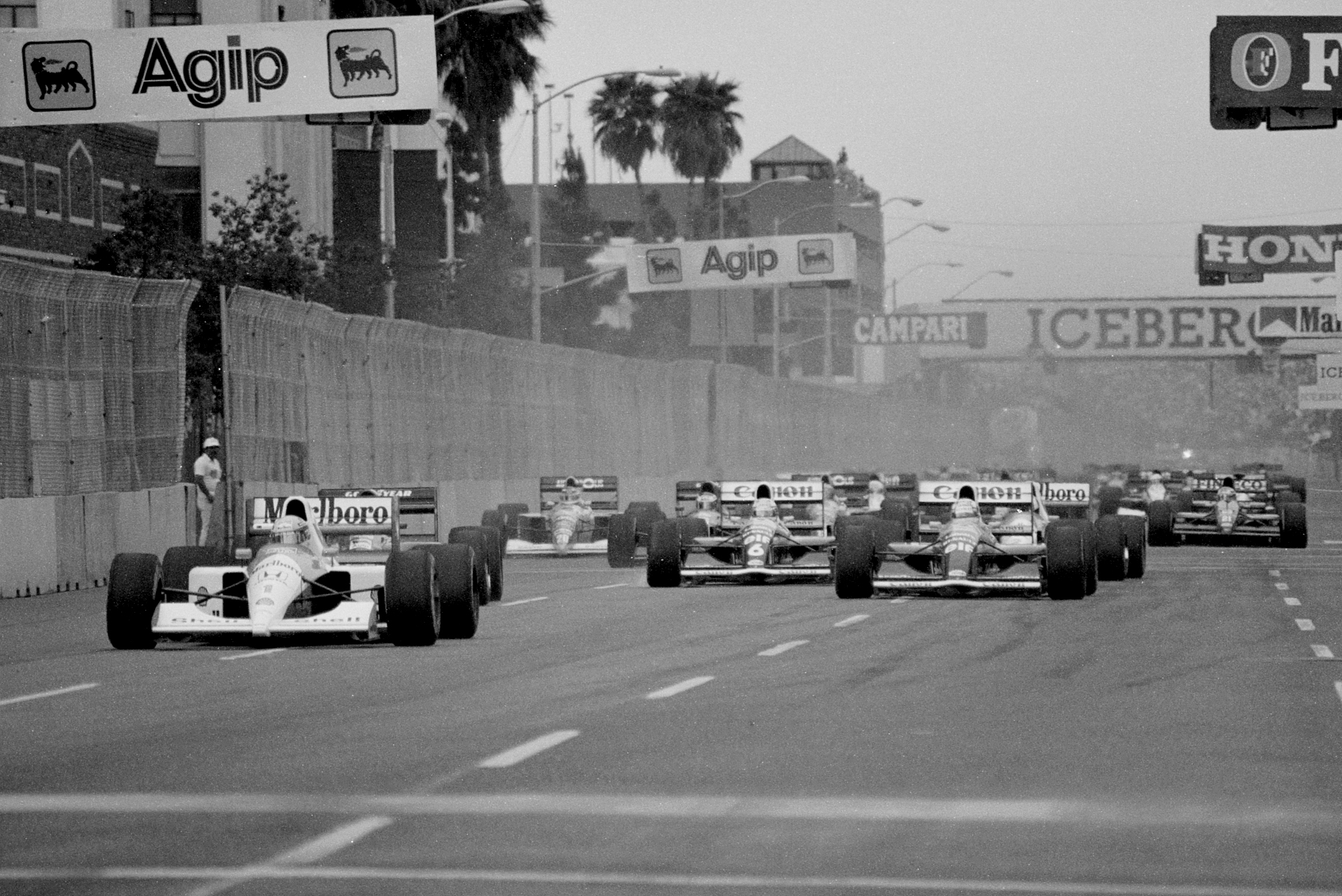
The start of the race, with Ayrton Senna leading the field.

On Sunday, Prost began his second season at Ferrari alongside Senna on the front row. At the start, he fell in behind the Brazilian, with Nigel Mansell slipping ahead of Riccardo Patrese. Alesi and Gerhard Berger followed, then Nelson Piquet, Roberto Moreno, Stefano Modena and Emanuele Pirro. A lap later, Alesi, in his first race for Ferrari, swept past Patrese, but by then Senna was pulling away. After ten laps, he had a lead of ten seconds over Prost.

Behind Senna, Patrese was involved in two successive three-way battles. First, after getting back by Alesi for fourth on lap 16, Patrese closed on Mansell who was immediately behind Prost. By lap 22, Patrese was close enough to attack his Williams team-mate but overshot onto the escape road, as Mansell swerved to avoid him. Upon rejoining, Patrese quickly latched onto Alesi and Berger, as the new three-car train now covered fourth through sixth places. Patrese had gotten past Berger when, suddenly, two of the top six runners retired on consecutive laps. On lap 35, Mansell pulled over when the Williams's new semi-automatic gearbox failed, and on the next time around, Berger's race ended as well.

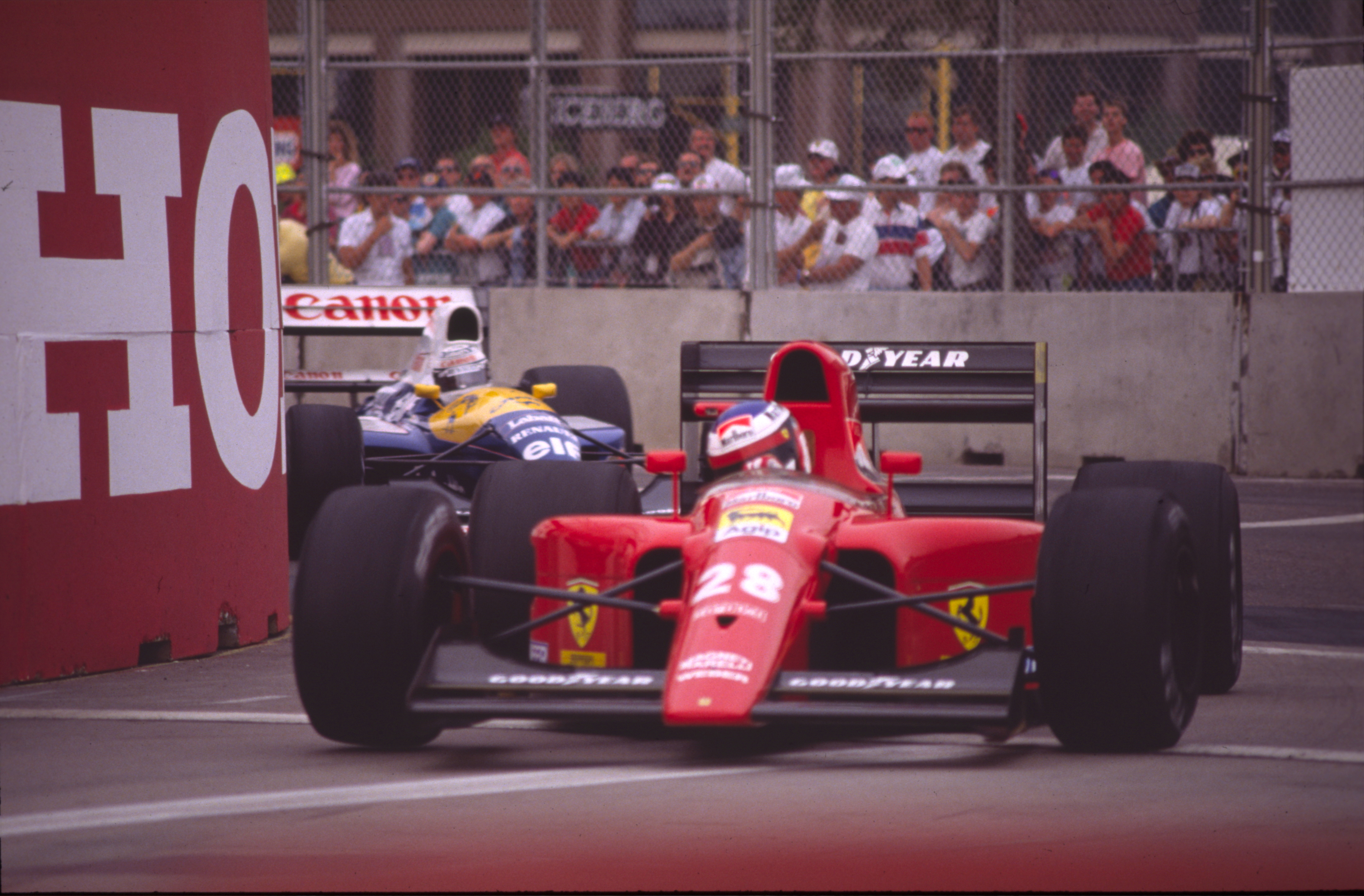
Prost's teammate Jean Alesi is pursued by Riccardo Patrese in the Williams FW14.

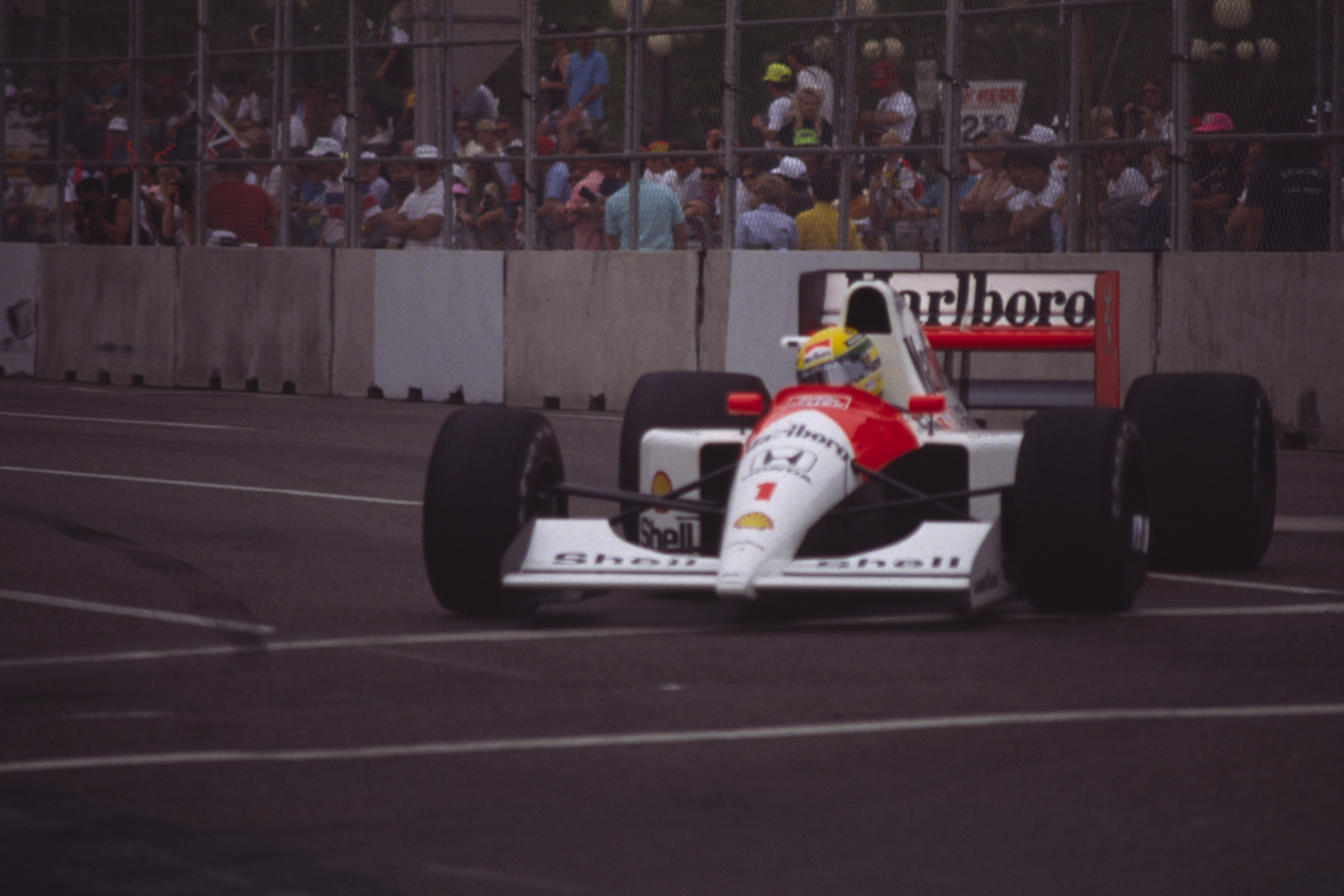
Ayrton Senna took a comfortable win in his McLaren MP4/6.

Patrese passed Alesi for the second time, and Alesi pitted for new Goodyear tires on lap 43. He rejoined in seventh. Three laps later, Prost was being hounded by Patrese, and he also pitted, ceding second spot to the Williams. When the Ferrari crew had problems changing his right rear tire, the Frenchman dropped to seventh behind Modena's Tyrrell-Honda.

On lap 48, Senna pitted without giving up the lead. Like Mansell, Patrese was having problems with the gearbox in his Williams, and when it selected neutral midway through Turn Seven, it caused him to spin out of second place. The car stopped on the outside of the track, perpendicular to the racing line. Piquet and Mika Häkkinen (making his F1 debut) barely managed to avoid him as they passed, but before Patrese could get out of the car, Moreno, in the second Benetton, went straight across the bow of the Williams, removing the nose of Patrese's car and the right front wheel of the Benetton. Neither driver was injured. Patrese and Moreno's cars remained on the course throughout the race, and Bertrand Gachot, driving the first race for the new Jordan team and challenging Satoru Nakajima, spun later after swerving to avoid them.

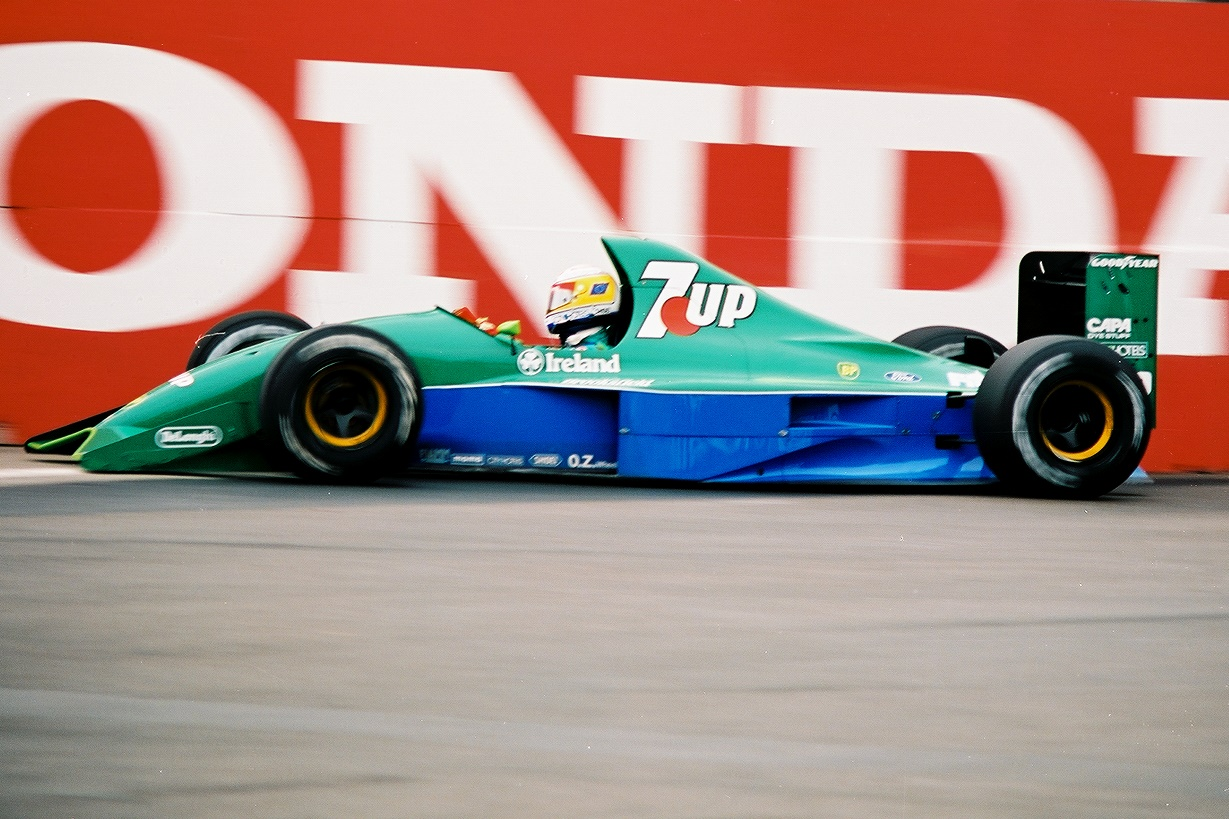
The race marked the debut of the Jordan team in F1. Bertrand Gachot was classified tenth after a late-race engine failure prevented him from finishing.

With Patrese out, Senna led Piquet, who was having to hold off Alesi, by over a minute. Alesi squeezed up to second on lap 53, while four laps later Prost disposed of Modena. Then on lap 70, Prost went from fourth to second in one move at turn five. With Alesi and Piquet running second and third, Piquet's Benetton pulled alongside Alesi– who had set the race's fastest lap while Prost was in the pits– in Turn Four, but could not get by. Down the straight, however, Piquet passed Alesi for second place. Prost also went by his new teammate on the left, and then sliced back to the right, between Alesi and Piquet, beating Piquet to the apex of Turn Five and regaining second place. By now Senna led by 40 seconds.

Gearbox troubles dropped Alesi to fifth before he retired less than 10 laps from the finish, leaving third place to Piquet who, like the two Tyrrells following, had never pitted for tires. Martini was pressing Satoru Nakajima for fifth, only to have his engine let go after 75 laps. A similar problem removed Gachot from eighth on the same lap, promoting Aguri Suzuki to sixth. The race ended a lap short of the planned 82 as the two-hour limit was reached, Senna taking the win having led every lap. This was the twenty-seventh Grand Prix victory of Senna's career.

After the race, Senna assessed his new car's performance: "I had small problems with the gearbox, and the car balance was not optimum, so it was very difficult to drive. I'm looking forward to running a proper circuit with proper conditions and see what the car can do."

=== Race classification ===
Pos	No	Driver	Constructor	Tyre	Laps	Time/Retired	Grid	Points
1	1	(Brazil) Ayrton Senna	McLaren-Honda	G	81	2:00:47.828	1	10
2	27	(France) Alain Prost	Ferrari	G	81	+ 16.322	2	6
3	20	(Brazil) Nelson Piquet	Benetton-Ford	P	81	+ 17.376	5	4
4	4	(Italy) Stefano Modena	Tyrrell-Honda	P	81	+ 25.409	11	3
5	3	(Japan) Satoru Nakajima	Tyrrell-Honda	P	80	+ 1 lap	16	2
6	30	(Japan) Aguri Suzuki	Lola-Ford	G	79	+ 2 laps	21	1
7	34	(Italy) Nicola Larini	Lambo-Lamborghini	G	78	+ 3 laps	17	
8	17	(Italy) Gabriele Tarquini	AGS-Ford	G	77	+ 4 laps	22	
9	23	(Italy) Pierluigi Martini	Minardi-Ferrari	G	75	Engine	15	
10	32	(Belgium) Bertrand Gachot	Jordan-Ford	G	75	Engine	14	
11	7	(United Kingdom) Martin Brundle	Brabham-Yamaha	P	73	+ 8 laps	12	
12	28	(France) Jean Alesi	Ferrari	G	72	Gearbox	6	
Ret	11	(Finland) Mika Häkkinen	Lotus-Judd	G	59	Engine	13	
Ret	6	(Italy) Riccardo Patrese	Williams-Renault	G	49	Gearbox	3	
Ret	19	(Brazil) Roberto Moreno	Benetton-Ford	P	49	Collision	8	
Ret	9	(Italy) Michele Alboreto	Footwork-Porsche	G	41	Engine	25	
Ret	16	(Italy) Ivan Capelli	Leyton House-Ilmor	G	40	Gearbox	18	
Ret	25	(Belgium) Thierry Boutsen	Ligier-Lamborghini	G	40	Engine	20	
Ret	2	(Austria) Gerhard Berger	McLaren-Honda	G	36	Fuel pump	7	
Ret	5	(United Kingdom) Nigel Mansell	Williams-Renault	G	35	Gearbox	4	
Ret	15	(Brazil) Maurício Gugelmin	Leyton House-Ilmor	G	34	Gearbox	23	
Ret	8	(United Kingdom) Mark Blundell	Brabham-Yamaha	P	32	Spun off	24	
Ret	21	(Italy) Emanuele Pirro	Dallara-Judd	P	16	Gearbox	9	
Ret	24	(Italy) Gianni Morbidelli	Minardi-Ferrari	G	15	Gearbox	26	
Ret	22	(Finland) JJ Lehto	Dallara-Judd	P	12	Gearbox	10	
Ret	29	(France) Éric Bernard	Lola-Ford	G	4	Engine	19	
DNQ	26	(France) Érik Comas	Ligier-Lamborghini	G				
DNQ	10	(Italy) Alex Caffi	Footwork-Porsche	G				
DNQ	18	(Sweden) Stefan Johansson	AGS-Ford	G				
DNQ	12	(United Kingdom) Julian Bailey	Lotus-Judd	G				
DNPQ	33	(Italy) Andrea de Cesaris	Jordan-Ford	G				
DNPQ	31	(Portugal) Pedro Chaves	Coloni-Ford	G				
DNPQ	14	(France) Olivier Grouillard	Fondmetal-Ford	G				
DNPQ	35	(Belgium) Eric van de Poele	Lambo-Lamborghini	G				

== Championship standings after the race ==
Drivers' Championship standings

Pos	Driver	Points
1	(Brazil) Ayrton Senna	10
2	(France) Alain Prost	6
3	(Brazil) Nelson Piquet	4
4	(Italy) Stefano Modena	3
5	(Japan) Satoru Nakajima	2

Constructors' Championship standings

Pos	Constructor	Points
1	(United Kingdom) McLaren-Honda	10
2	(Italy) Ferrari	6
3	(United Kingdom) Tyrrell-Honda	5
4	(United Kingdom) Benetton-Ford	4
5	(United Kingdom) Lola-Ford	1

- Note: Only the top five positions are included for both sets of standings.

Previous race: 1990 Australian Grand Prix	FIA Formula One World Championship; 1991 season	Next race: 1991 Brazilian Grand Prix
Previous race: 1990 United States Grand Prix	United States Grand Prix	Next race: 2000 United States Grand Prix
