= Dallara F189 =

Formula One racing car

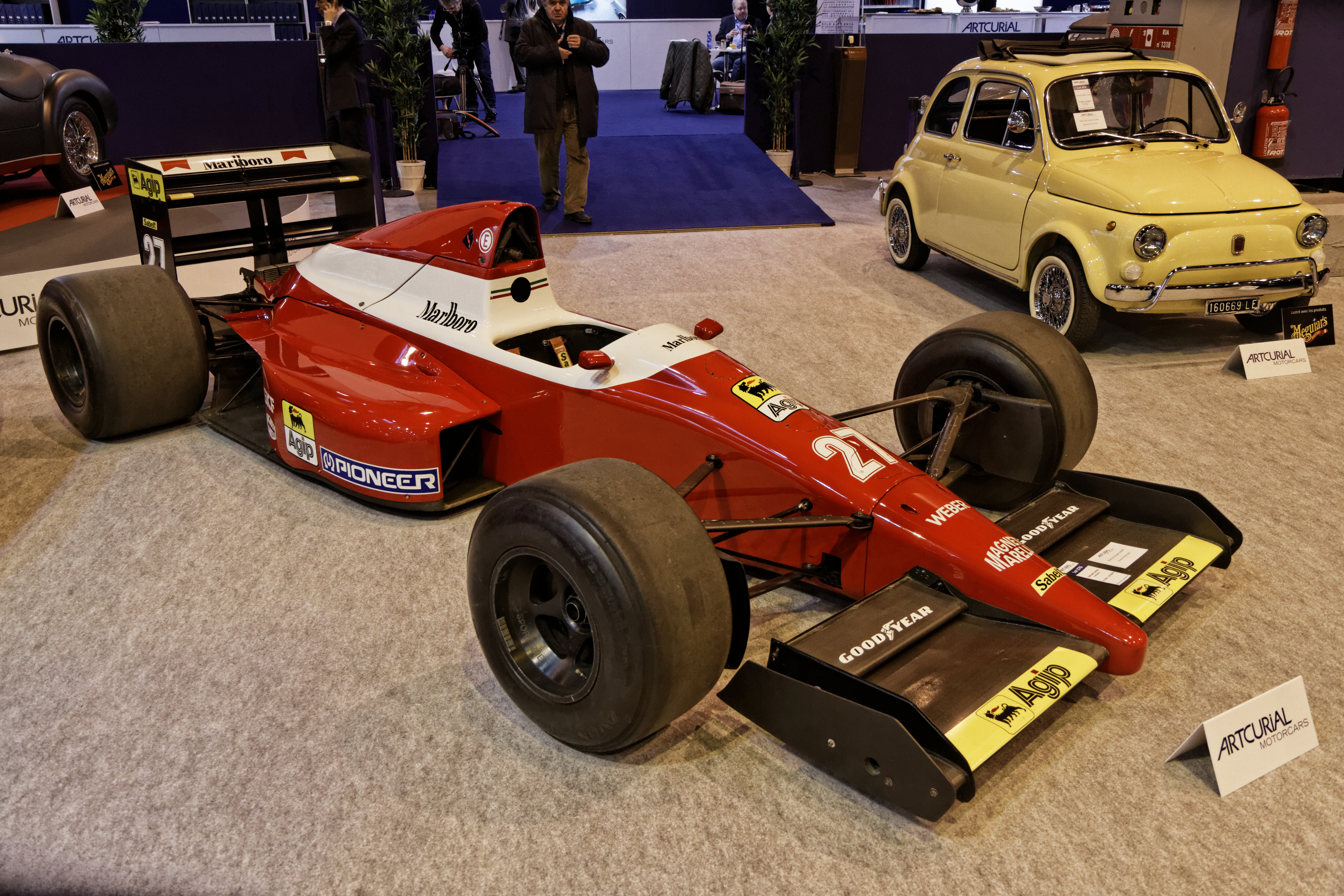
- Dallara F189 on display, repainted to mimic a 1993 Ferrari F93A
- Category: Formula One
- Constructor: Dallara
- Designers: Giampaolo Dallara (Technical Director); Mario Tollentino (Chief Designer)
- Predecessor: Dallara F188
- Successor: Dallara F190

Technical specifications
- Chassis: Carbon fibre/Kevlar monocoque
- Axle track: Front: 1,792 mm (70.6 in); Rear: 1,676 mm (66.0 in)
- Wheelbase: 2,858 mm (112.5 in)
- Engine: Cosworth DFR 3,494 cc (213.2 cu in), V8, NA, mid-engine, longitudinally-mounted
- Transmission: BMS / Hewland 6-speed manual
- Power: 595 hp (443.7 kW)
- Fuel: 500 kg (1,100 lb)
- Lubricants: Agip
- Tyres: Pirelli

Competition history
- Notable entrants: BMS Scuderia Italia
- Notable drivers: (Italy) Alex Caffi (Italy) Andrea de Cesaris
- Debut: 1989 Brazilian Grand Prix
Races	Wins	Poles	F/Laps
16	0	0	0
- Constructors' Championships: 0
- Drivers' Championships: 0

The Dallara F189 was a Formula One car designed by Giampaolo Dallara and Mario Tollentino for use by the BMS Scuderia Italia team during the 1989 Formula One season. Its best finish was achieved by Andrea de Cesaris when he finished third at the Canadian Grand Prix.

== Development ==
The Dallara F189, designed by Giampaolo Dallara and Mario Tollentino, was an evolution of the previous year's Dallara F188. It was powered by Cosworth DFR V8 engines prepared by Heini Mader.

== Race history ==
For 1989, BMS Scuderia Italia expanded to a two car team. Alex Caffi remained on the roster, joined by the very experienced Andrea de Cesaris. As Caffi scored no points in 1988, and de Cesaris had scored three points for Rial, this actually meant that Caffi was bumped into pre-qualifying for the first half of the season. However, with a good car and Pirelli's generally strong qualifying tyres this normally was not much of a problem for Caffi.

In the team's other entry, de Cesaris qualified in 15th place for the season opening Brazilian Grand Prix and was classified 13th even though engine problems meant he failed to finish. His best race was in Canada when, in a rain-affected event, he finished third from ninth on the grid (his best qualifying performance of the year). This, his only points finish of the year, was the first of two podiums achieved by Scuderia Italia in Formula One and would prove to be de Cesaris' last podium finish in the category. At the following race in France he failed to qualify, though he made every other race, mostly in the second half of the grid.

Caffi in the meantime failed to pre-qualify in Brazil and he would repeat this feat later in the year at the British Grand Prix. These proved to be anomalies as he made the field for the other 14 races of the season, usually ahead of De Cesaris, and in some cases well inside the top half of the grid. He qualified sixth in Phoenix and ran as high as second at one point before retiring after suffering suspension damage when he was pushed into a concrete barrier while attempting to lap his own team mate Andrea de Cesaris. Later in the year, in Hungary, Caffi did even better by placing his F189 third on the grid behind only the McLaren-Honda of defending World Champion Ayrton Senna and the pole winning Williams-Renault of Riccardo Patrese, both using more powerful V10 engines (immediately behind Caffi on the grid were Patrese's team mate Thierry Boutsen and Senna's team mate, 1989 World Champion Alain Prost). This failed to translate into points however, and he was only seventh in the race itself. Caffi finished in the points on two occasions; fourth at Monaco and sixth in Canada, the only race at which both Dallara drivers finished in the points. These points saw Caffi 'graduate' and not have to pre-qualify for the second half of the season.

By the end of the season, Caffi was ranked 13th, alongside De Cesaris, in the Drivers' Championship with four points. Meanwhile, BMS Scuderia Italia's eight points in total placed them eighth in the Constructors' Championship.

== Complete Formula One results ==
(key) (results in bold indicate pole position; results in italics indicate fastest lap)

Year	Team	Engine	Tyres	Drivers	1	2	3	4	5	6	7	8	9	10	11	12	13	14	15	16	Pts.	WCC
1989	BMS Scuderia Italia	Cosworth DFR V8	**P**		BRA	SMR	MON	MEX	USA	CAN	FRA	GBR	GER	HUN	BEL	ITA	POR	ESP	JPN	AUS	**8**	**8th**
1989	BMS Scuderia Italia	Cosworth DFR V8	**P**	Alex Caffi	DNPQ	7	4	13	Ret	6	Ret	DNPQ	Ret	7	Ret	Ret	Ret	Ret	9	Ret	**8**	**8th**
1989	BMS Scuderia Italia	Cosworth DFR V8	**P**	Andrea de Cesaris	13*	10	13	Ret	8*	3	DNQ	Ret	7	Ret	11	Ret	Ret	7	10	Ret	**8**	**8th**
