= Dallara F188 =

Formula One racing car

- Category: Formula One
- Constructor: Dallara
- Designers: Giampaolo Dallara (Technical Director); Sergio Rinland (Chief Designer)
- Predecessor: Dallara 3087
- Successor: Dallara F189

Technical specifications
- Chassis: Carbon fibre monocoque
- Axle track: Front: 1,792 mm (70.6 in); Rear: 1,672 mm (65.8 in)
- Wheelbase: 2,880 mm (113 in)
- Engine: Ford-Cosworth DFZ 3,494 cc (213.2 cu in), V8, NA, mid-engine, longitudinally mounted
- Transmission: BMS / Hewland 6-speed manual
- Fuel: 500 kg (1,100 lb)
- Lubricants: Castrol
- Tyres: Goodyear

Competition history
- Notable entrants: BMS Scuderia Italia
- Notable drivers: 36. (Italy) Alex Caffi
- Debut: 1988 San Marino Grand Prix
Races	Wins	Poles	F/Laps
14	0	0	0
- Constructors' Championships: 0
- Drivers' Championships: 0

The Dallara F188 was a Formula One car designed by Giampaolo Dallara and Sergio Rinland for use by the BMS Scuderia Italia team during the 1988 Formula One season. Driven by Italian Alex Caffi, it failed to score any points for the team.

== Development ==
Dallara was contracted by Beppe Lucchini to design a car for his new BMS Scuderia Italia racing team, which was to participate in the 1988 Formula One season. The F188, powered by a Cosworth DFZ V8 engine, was designed by Giampaolo Dallara in conjunction with Sergio Rinland. With the longest wheelbase of all the Formula One cars entered for 1988, the F188 was a well-regarded car given the resources available to Dallara. A total of three chassis were built during the year.

== Race history ==
Scuderia Italia ran a single entry through 1988 for Italian Alex Caffi. The F188 was not quite ready to start the season and a F3000 chassis, the Dallara 3087, was used for the opening race in Brazil. Caffi debuted the F188 at San Marino where he qualified in 24th but retired from the race itself. He put in a creditable performance throughout the year and qualified for all but one race with the F188, with a best of 10th in Hungary. No points finishes were scored, but Caffi did manage a best placing of seventh, at the Portuguese Grand Prix.

== Complete Formula One results ==
(key) (results in bold indicate pole position; results in italics indicate fastest lap)

Year	Team	Engine	Tyres	Drivers	1	2	3	4	5	6	7	8	9	10	11	12	13	14	15	16	Points	WCC
1988	BMS Scuderia Italia	Ford DFZ 3.5 V8	**G**		BRA	SMR	MON	MEX	CAN	DET	FRA	GBR	GER	HUN	BEL	ITA	POR	ESP	JPN	AUS	**0**	**NC**
1988	BMS Scuderia Italia	Ford DFZ 3.5 V8	**G**	Alex Caffi		Ret	Ret	Ret	DNPQ	8	12	11	15	Ret	8	Ret	7	10	Ret	Ret	**0**	**NC**
