= Dallara F190 =

Formula One racing car

- Category: Formula One
- Constructor: Dallara
- Designers: Giampaolo Dallara (Technical Director); Christian Vanderpleyn (Chief Designer)
- Predecessor: Dallara F189
- Successor: Dallara F191

Technical specifications
- Chassis: Carbon Fibre Monocoque
- Axle track: Front: 1,816 mm (71.5 in); Rear: 1,686 mm (66.4 in)
- Wheelbase: 2,898 mm (114.1 in)
- Engine: Cosworth DFR 3,493 cc (213.2 cu in), V8, NA, mid-engine, longitudinally mounted
- Transmission: Dallara/Hewland 6-speed
- Fuel: Agip
- Tyres: Pirelli

Competition history
- Notable entrants: BMS Scuderia Italia
- Notable drivers: 21. (Italy) Gianni Morbidelli; 21. (Italy) Emanuele Pirro; 22. (Italy) Andrea de Cesaris
- Debut: 1990 United States Grand Prix
Races	Wins	Poles	F/Laps
16	0	0	0

The Dallara F190 was a Formula One car designed by Giampaolo Dallara and Christian Vanderpleyn for use by the BMS Scuderia Italia team during the 1990 Formula One season. It was powered by the 3.5L Cosworth DFR engine. It failed to score any points for the team.

== Race history ==
Driven by Italians Andrea de Cesaris and Emanuele Pirro (Gianni Morbidelli drove in the first two races of the season when Pirro had been diagnosed with hepatitis), the car debuted at the 1990 United States Grand Prix, where de Cesaris qualified third on the grid. He was running in fifth place when he retired with engine problems.

BMS Scuderia Italia failed to earn any points with the F190 during the season. Reliability was poor and the team's drivers were only able to reach the finish in seven of the season's sixteen Grands Prix, although one of these finishes (de Cesaris in France) was later disqualified. The best results for the F190 were a pair of 10th places, one for Pirro in Hungary and the other by de Cesaris in Italy.

== Complete Formula One results ==
(key)

Year	Team	Engine(s)	Tyres	Drivers	1	2	3	4	5	6	7	8	9	10	11	12	13	14	15	16	Points	WCC
1990	BMS Scuderia Italia	Ford DFR 3.5 V8	P		USA	BRA	SMR	MON	CAN	MEX	FRA	GBR	GER	HUN	BEL	ITA	POR	ESP	JPN	AUS	0	NC
1990	BMS Scuderia Italia	Ford DFR 3.5 V8	P	Gianni Morbidelli	DNQ	14															0	NC
1990	BMS Scuderia Italia	Ford DFR 3.5 V8	P	Emanuele Pirro			Ret	Ret	Ret	Ret	Ret	11	Ret	10	Ret	Ret	15	Ret	Ret	Ret	0	NC
1990	BMS Scuderia Italia	Ford DFR 3.5 V8	P	Andrea de Cesaris	Ret	Ret	Ret	Ret	Ret	13	DSQ	Ret	DNQ	Ret	Ret	10	Ret	Ret	Ret	Ret	0	NC
