= Emiliani 380 =

Emiliani 380 Dallara F380
- Category: Formula Three
- Designer: Giampaolo Dallara
- Predecessor: Wolf WD1
- Successor: Dallara 381

Technical specifications
- Length: 3,999 millimetres (157.4 in)
- Width: 1,496 millimetres (58.9 in)
- Height: 999 millimetres (39.3 in)
- Wheelbase: 1,897 millimetres (74.7 in)
- Engine: Toyota 2T-G 1,997 cubic centimetres (121.9 cu in) I4 NA Mid Engine, RWD
- Transmission: 5-speed manual
- Power: 173 brake horsepower (129 kW) @ 6,000 rpm 225 newton-metres (166 lbf⋅ft) @ 5,100 rpm
- Weight: 450 kilograms (990 lb)

Competition history
- Notable entrants: Scuderia Emiliani; Walter Wolf Racing
- Notable drivers: Guido Pardini; Massimo Valentini
- Debut: 1979 Vallelunga Italian Formula 3 Round
- Last event: 1980 Vallelunga Italian Formula 3 Round
Races	Wins	Podiums	F/Laps	Titles
36	8	12	21	1
- Teams' Championships: 1
- Constructors' Championships: 1

The Emiliani 380 is the first Formula Three car built by Dallara. The original chassis, that of a Wolf WD1, would be taken by Giampaolo Dallara, and fitted with a more aerodynamic body, this however, meant that the car would be a one-off given the rarity of the parts. The engine was a Toyota 2T-G, and the car was raced successfully in the Italian Formula Three Championship, where Guido Pardini won the 1980 championship.
