= Giuseppe Lucchini =

Italian businessman and car collector

Giuseppe Lucchini (born 1952) is an Italian businessman, cars collector, and chairman of the family-owned Lucchini RS.

Giuseppe Lucchini was born in Brescia in 1952. His family was involved with the steel-making industry. He was educated at the University of Pavia, where he received a bachelor's degree in politics and economics.

In 1983, he founded the auto racing team BMS Scuderia Italia (sometimes referred to as simply Scuderia Italia). Initially named Brixia Motor Sport (BMS) and briefly entering the World Touring Car Championship, the team's name was altered to BMS Scuderia Italia upon their entrance into Formula One in 1988. After departing Formula One in 1993, BMS Scuderia Italia has been involved in touring and sports car racing.

Lucchini owns one of only 39 Ferrari 250 GTOs built.
