= Giampaolo Dallara =

Italian businessman

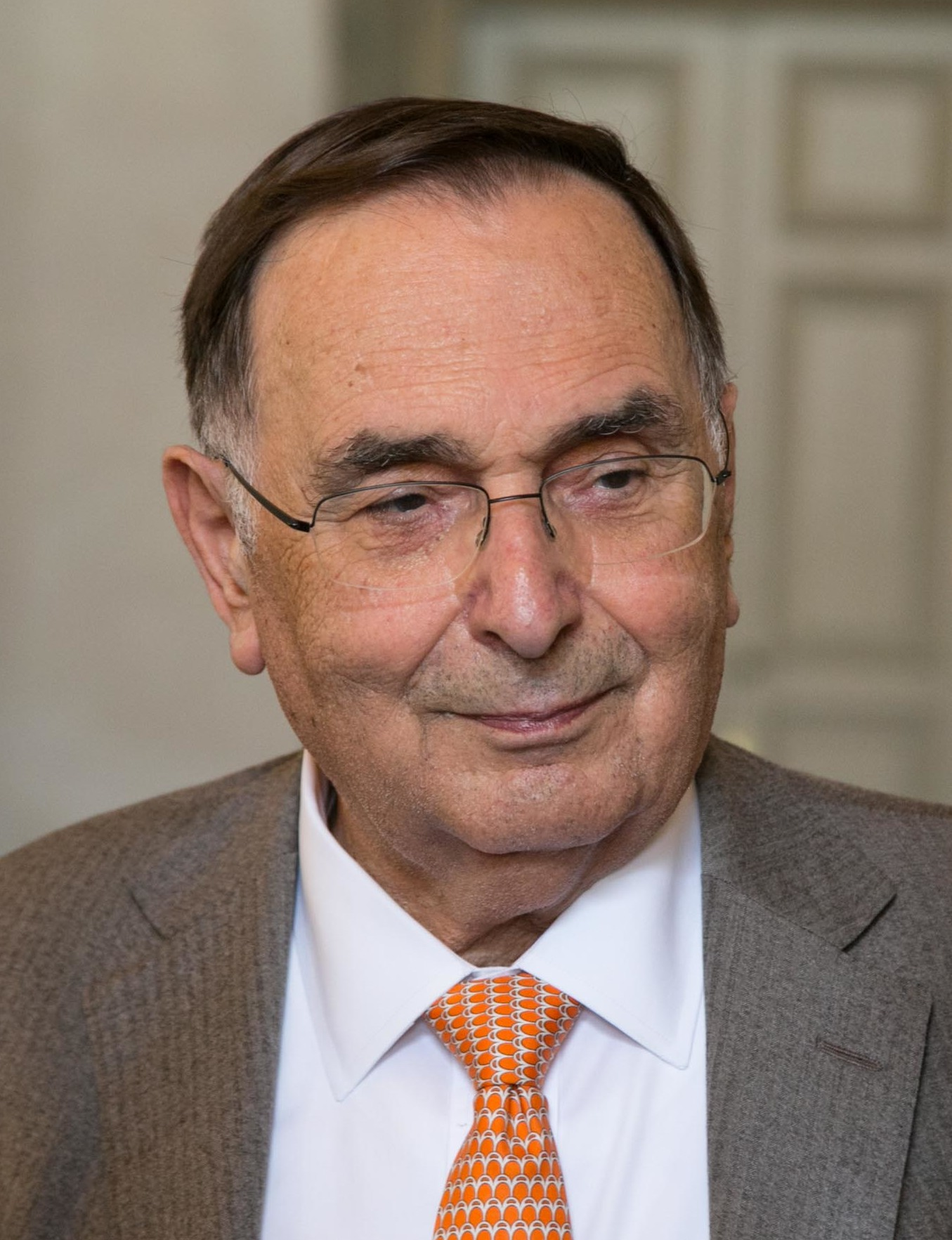
- Giampaolo Dallara in 2016
- Born: 16 November 1936 (age 89); Parma, Italy
- Education: Polytechnic University of Milan
- Known for: Founder of Dallara

Giampaolo Dallara (born 16 November 1936) is an Italian businessman and motorsports engineer. He is the owner of Dallara Motorsports, a company that develops racing cars.

== Biography ==
=== Early life ===
Dallara was born in Parma.

=== Automotive and motorsport ===
Dallara graduated from Politecnico di Milano, majoring in aeronautical engineering. He joined Ferrari in 1960, and next year moved to Maserati. In 1963, he was hired by Lamborghini as their chief designer, where he (along with Paolo Stanzani, and Bob Wallace) designed the chassis of the Lamborghini Espada and Miura. In 1969, he started to design race cars for Frank Williams, founder and manager of the Williams Formula One team. That year, Dallara also co-founded Autodromo Riccardo Paletti in the town of Varano, near Parma, Italy.

In 1972, Dallara founded and established Dallara Automobili in Varano. Starting from 1974, Dallara and his company started designing a Formula One car, the Iso-Marlboro IR, for the Williams Team. Another project included designing a race car to Formula 3 standards. This resulted in victories in Italy, France, England, Switzerland, Germany, Japan, United States, Russia, and Austria.

In 1997, Dallara and his company expanded into IndyCar racing, with many victories from 1998, until 2003. Since 2007, Dallara has been the single chassis supplier for IndyCar.

Dallara branched out into F1 projects in the mid-1990s, and at the end of 1998, Honda, considering a return to F1 as a constructor, called on Dallara to design their new F1 chassis. Honda later cancelled the project.

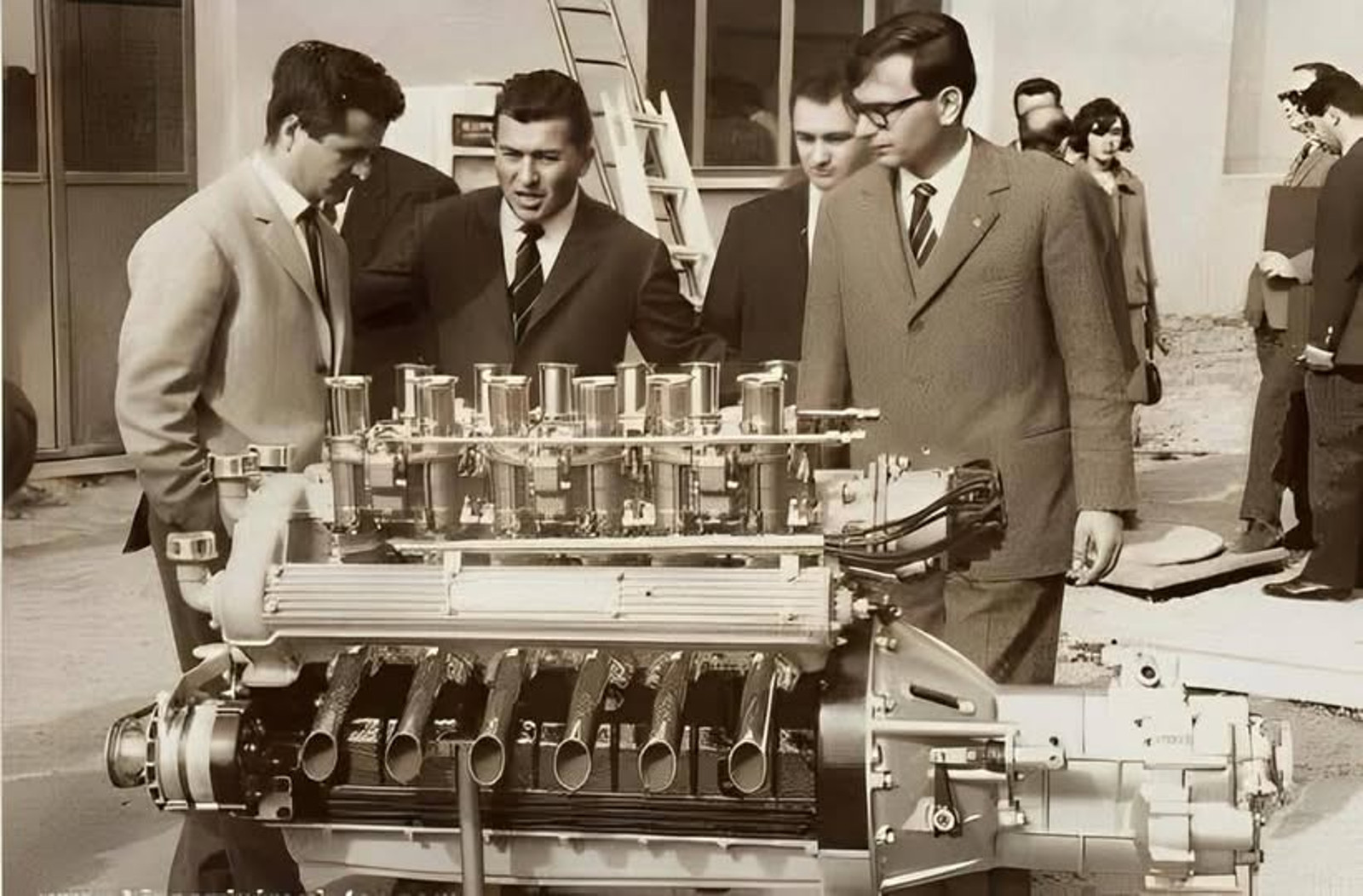
Giotto Bizzarrini, Ferruccio Lamborghini and Dallara at Sant'Agata Bolognese in 1963, with a Lamborghini V12 engine prototype.

Beginning in 2000, after the cancellation of the Honda project, Dallara embarked on a new project. He and his team were to build a race car for French team Oreca, in the Le Mans series. In August 2004, it was announced that Dallara and his team were signed by Alex Shnaider to build a chassis for the erstwhile Jordan team, Midland. Later, Dallara brought along Gary Anderson to handle this project. But by mid-2005, Dallara pulled out from the project.

In 2009, Dallara and his team began a project building an F1 chassis for the new team, Campos Grand Prix, later known as Hispania.

=== Association Football ===
In 2015 Dallara became investor in the phoenix club Parma Calcio 1913 along with Guido Barilla and Mauro Del Rio.
