= 2014 European Stock 1000 Series =

The 2014 European Stock 1000 Series season was a motorcycle racing series that started over 2–4 May 2014 in Navarra, Spain and ended over 4–6 July at the Automotodróm Slovakia Ring, Slovakia. European Stock 1000, abbreviated as ACC 1000, was a part of Acceleration 2014, a series of festivals combining top class car and bike racing with music and entertainment. Next to ACC 1000, there was the Formula Acceleration 1, based on the former A1 Grand Prix, the MW-V6 Pickup Series, which used modified BRL V6 cars, the Legend SuperCup, based on legends car racing, and the European Stock 600 Series, which featured slightly slower bikes and slightly younger riders than the ACC 1000. As for the music, on Friday evenings, David Hasselhoff hosted "Celebrate the 80's and the 90's with The Hoff", a dance party featuring 2 Unlimited, Haddaway, Kim Wilde, and others. Saturday evenings saw performances of international DJs.

Two different riders won the races that were held towards the championship. At Navarra, Juan Mari Olías won ahead of Oscar Borrajo Rodriguez and Rafael Samper Izco. While at the Slovakia Ring, Radoslav Dulík won ahead of Ladislav Miklánek and Roman Kučera.

== Calendar ==
The 2014 calendar consisted of two races. Originally, seven were planned. However, Acceleration in Zolder, Acceleration at Paul Ricard, and Acceleration at Grobnik were cancelled on 27 June 2014 and Acceleration at Hungaroring was cancelled on 20 August 2014. Finally, during Acceleration in Assen, the European Stock 1000 Series was replaced by the national Open Wegrace Cup series, whose riders were not eligible to score points for the Acceleration championship.

Date	Event	Circuit	City
2–4 May 2014	Acceleration at Navarra	Circuito de Navarra	Navarra, Spain
4–6 Jul 2014	Acceleration at Slovakia Ring	Automotodróm Slovakia Ring	Orechová Potôň, Slovakia

== Technical specifications ==
- Engine:
  4-cylinder (600–1000 cc) 4-stroke
  3-cylinder (750–1000 cc) 4-stroke
  2-cylinder (850–1200 cc) 4-stroke
- Minimum weight: 165 kg
- Tyres: Michelin

== Standings ==
Scoring system

Points were awarded to the top 15 classified riders. Riders did not have to finish to be eligible for points, but had to complete 75% of the race. At the end of the season, the ACC 1000 Riders' title was awarded to the rider with the highest number of points.

Points allocation

Position	**1st**	**2nd**	**3rd**	**4th**	**5th**	**6th**	**7th**	**8th**	**9th**	**10th**	**11th**	**12th**	**13th**	**14th**	**15th**
Points	25	20	16	13	11	10	9	8	7	6	5	4	3	2	1

=== Riders' championship ===
Pos.	Rider	No.	Motorcycle	Races		Points
Pos.	Rider	No.	Motorcycle	NAV (Spain)	SVK (Slovakia)	Points
1	Juan Mari Olías Meler	88	Kawasaki	1		25
2	Radoslav Dulík	10	Kawasaki		**1**	25
3	Oscar Borrajo Rodriguez	76	BMW	**2**		20
4	Ladislav Miklánek	48	BMW		2	20
5	Rafael Samper Izco	23	Kawasaki	3		16
6	Roman Kučera	333	BMW		3	16
7	Javier Salillas Santos	7	BMW	4		13
8	Rezniciek	83			4	13
9	Mikel Aragunde Lopez	11	Ducati	5		11
10	Miro Bucko	001	BMW		5	11
11	Juan de Dios Mariscal Guerrero	79	Yamaha	6		10
12	Peter Surina	59	BMW		6	10
13	Rubén Gallego Palacio	53	Suzuki	7		9
14	Edmund Grégr	88	Yamaha		7	9
15	Jacob Alvaro Mata	28	BMW	8		8
16	Jaroslav Beran	6			8	8
17	Mario Peru Beramendi	35	Kawasaki	9		7
–	Pedro Arnaiz Campo	30	Yamaha	Ret		0
–	Ruben Borrajo Rodriguez	82	BMW	WD		0
–	Ibon Melendez Gutierrez	17	Honda	WD		0
–	Jonathan Garcia Narros	27	Yamaha	WD		0
–	Alexander Garcia Ponce	31	Yamaha	WD		0
–	Oscar San Emeterio Lezcano	16	Kawasaki	WD		0
–	Klimits	239			WD	0
–	Marek Lewandowski	14	BMW		WD	0
–	Palenik	44			WD	0
–	Andrej Hudec	39	BMW		WD	0
–	Robert Dimcev	144	Honda		WD	0
–	Lukáš Jasenský	9	Kawasaki		WD	0
–	Bartlomiej Lewandowski	14	BMW		WD	0
–	Petr Plevac	77			WD	0
–	Martin Klich	8			WD	0
Pos.	Rider	No.	Motorcycle	NAV (Spain)	SVK (Slovakia)	Points
Pos.	Rider	No.	Motorcycle	Races		Points

Colour	Result
Gold	Winner
Silver	Second place
Bronze	Third place
Green	Points classification
Blue	Non-points classification
Blue	Non-classified finish (NC)
Purple	Retired, not classified (Ret)
Red	Did not qualify (DNQ)
Red	Did not pre-qualify (DNPQ)
Black	Disqualified (DSQ)
White	Did not start (DNS)
White	Withdrew (WD)
White	Race cancelled (C)
Blank	Did not practice (DNP)
Blank	Did not arrive (DNA)
Blank	Excluded (EX)

**Bold** – Pole
Italics – Fastest Lap
