= 2014 Formula Acceleration 1 season =

The 2014 Formula Acceleration 1 season was a formula racing series that started over 25–27 April in Portimao, Portugal and ended over 17–19 October at the TT Circuit Assen, Netherlands. The series featured 12 teams that represented the nations in which they were founded. Their drivers did not have that nationality per sé, but the car represented the flag. This concept was similar to the one used in the former A1 Grand Prix series, whose vehicles were used in FA1. To attract young, yet serious, racing drivers, the 2014 winning driver/team was promised the full budget for the 2015 FA1 season and a test day in a GP2 Series car in Abu Dhabi.

Formula Acceleration 1 (FA1) was the most prominent part of Acceleration 2014, a series of festivals combining top class car and bike racing with music and entertainment. Next to FA1, there was the MW-V6 Pickup Series, based on the former Dutch racing series BRL V6, the Legend SuperCup, based on legends car racing, and the European Stock 600 and 1000 Series, which featured motorcycle racing for 15- and 16-year-olds. As for the music, on Friday evenings, David Hasselhoff hosted "Celebrate the 80's and the 90's with The Hoff", a dance party featuring 2 Unlimited, Haddaway, Kim Wilde, and others. Saturday evenings saw performances from international DJs.

The championship was dominated by Nigel Melker and Mirko Bortolotti, taking eight of the ten race victories between them. Melker clinched the championship title after Bortolotti skipped the final round at Assen. Third place in the championship went to Richard Gonda, who achieved a trio of podium finishes but without victory. Indeed, the only other driver to take a race victory besides Melker and Bortolotti was Felix Rosenqvist, who completed a double at Monza; he finished the season in fifth place, three points behind Sebastian Balthasar. Netherlands won the nations' championship by 10.5 points ahead of Italy.

On 22 December 2014, it was announced that the series would be merged with Auto GP in 2015, to ensure that at least 18 cars will participate in each race. It was also announced that the 2015 champion will be granted a Formula One test.

== Calendar ==
The 2014 calendar consisted of five race weekends. Originally, nine were planned. However, Acceleration in Zolder, Acceleration at Paul Ricard, and Acceleration at Grobnik were cancelled on 27 June 2014 and Acceleration at Hungaroring was cancelled on 20 August 2014.

Date	Event	Circuit	City
29–30 Nov 2013	Testing	Circuito de Navarra	Navarra, Spain
26–27 Mar 2014	Testing	Circuit Ricardo Tormo	Valencia, Spain
22–23 Apr 2014	Testing	Autódromo Internacional do Algarve	Portimão, Portugal
25–27 Apr 2014	Acceleration at Portimão	Autódromo Internacional do Algarve	Portimão, Portugal
2–4 May 2014	Acceleration at Navarra	Circuito de Navarra	Navarra, Spain
23–25 May 2014	Acceleration at Nürburgring	Nürburgring	Nürburg, Germany
6–8 Jun 2014	Acceleration in Monza	Autodromo Nazionale Monza	Monza, Italy
17–19 Oct 2014	Acceleration in Assen	TT Circuit Assen	Assen, Netherlands

=== Race format ===
Day	Duration	Event
Friday	30 min	Free practice 1
Friday	30 min	Free practice 2
Friday	30 min	Qualifying for race 1 (1 point for pole position)
Saturday	30 min	Qualifying for race 2 (1 point for pole position)
Saturday	30 min	Race 1 (1 mandatory pit stop)
Sunday	45 min	Race 2 (2 mandatory pit stops)

== Entrants ==
Entrant (Team)	No.	Driver	Rounds
China; Moma Motorsport; Team Lazarus	8	(Netherlands) Steijn Schothorst	4
China; Moma Motorsport; Team Lazarus	29	(Spain) Oliver Campos-Hull	1
China; Moma Motorsport; Team Lazarus	29	(Portugal) Armando Parente	2–3
China; Moma Motorsport; Team Lazarus	32	(France) Nathanaël Berthon	5
France; Azerti Motorsport	17	(Belgium) Alessio Picariello	3–5
France; Azerti Motorsport	32	(Italy) Sergio Campana	1
France; Azerti Motorsport	32	(France) Nathanaël Berthon	2
Germany; Performance Racing; MP Motorsport	4	(Germany) Sebastian Balthasar	All
Italy; Team Ghinzani; Team Lazarus	16	(Italy) Mirko Bortolotti	1–4
Italy; Team Ghinzani; Team Lazarus	18	(Italy) Gian Maria Gabbiani	5
Italy; Team Ghinzani; Team Lazarus	42	(Italy) Sergio Campana	5
Mexico; RC Motorsport; NBC Motorsport; MP Motorsport; Kraan Motorsport	22	(Sweden) Kevin Kleveros	5
Mexico; RC Motorsport; NBC Motorsport; MP Motorsport; Kraan Motorsport	38	(Mexico) Luis Michael Dörrbecker	All
Mexico; RC Motorsport; NBC Motorsport; MP Motorsport; Kraan Motorsport	39	(Mexico) Picho Toledano	1–4
Netherlands; Azerti Motorsport; MP Motorsport	6	(Netherlands) Bas Schouten	5
Netherlands; Azerti Motorsport; MP Motorsport	7	(Netherlands) Nigel Melker	All
Portugal; Team Ghinzani	21	(Netherlands) Jeroen Mul	5
Portugal; Team Ghinzani	42	(Portugal) Armando Parente	1
Portugal; Team Ghinzani	42	(Italy) Sergio Campana	2–4
Slovakia; Team Ghinzani	64	(Slovakia) Richard Gonda	All
Spain; Moma Motorsport	10	(Spain) Victor Garcia	1
Spain; Moma Motorsport	10	(Spain) Oliver Campos-Hull	2–3
Spain; Moma Motorsport	11	(Spain) Marco Barba	4–5
Sweden; Performance Racing	19	(United Kingdom) Craig Dolby	5
Sweden; Performance Racing	23	(Sweden) Felix Rosenqvist	1, 4
Sweden; Performance Racing	24	(Sweden) Jimmy Eriksson	3
Sweden; Performance Racing	45	(Denmark) Dennis Lind	2
United Kingdom; Moma Motorsport	69	(Spain) Dani Clos	5
Venezuela; RC Motorsport; Team Lazarus	20	(Venezuela) Rodolfo González	1–2
Venezuela; RC Motorsport; Team Lazarus	45	(Denmark) Dennis Lind	3–4

Notes

- Portimao: Picho Toledano was entered for the inaugural weekend but withdrew due to technical problems without competing in a session.
- Navarra: Nathanaël Berthon replaced Sergio Campana at Acceleration Team France. Campana replaced Armando Parente and drove for Portugal, while Parente joined the Chinese team. Oliver Campos-Hull therefore moved to Team Spain, replacing Victor Garcia. Finally, the Danish-born Dennis Lind took Felix Rosenqvist's seat at the Swedish team.
- Nürburgring: Alessio Picariello replaced Nathanaël Berthon at Acceleration Team France. Jimmy Eriksson replaced Dennis Lind at the Swedish team. Lind moved to Acceleration Team Venezuela, replacing Rodolfo González.
- Monza: Marco Barba replaced Oliver Campos-Hull at Acceleration Team Spain. Felix Rosenqvist came back to the Swedish team, taking over from Jimmy Eriksson. Steijn Schothorst made his debut for Acceleration Team China, run by the Venezuelan Team Lazarus, which also employed Dennis Lind for the race.
- Assen: Nathanaël Berthon drove for China. Italy entered two cars, for Gian Maria Gabbiani and Sergio Campana, who was replaced by Dutchman Jeroen Mul at Acceleration Team Portugal. The Swede Kevin Kleveros took over from Picho Toledano and Craig Dolby drove for Sweden instead of Felix Rosenqvist. Acceleration Team Netherlands also entered a second car for Bas Schouten, who previously entered MW-V6. Finally, Acceleration Team United Kingdom entered this race with Dani Clos at the wheel.

== Technical specifications ==
All cars were mechanically identical and were built with reducing costs in mind, which led to an approximate price for the whole season of €450,000. FA1 used the Lola B05/52, used in A1 Grand Prix between 2005 and 2008.

- Engine: 3.4L V8 Zytek ZA1348
- Horsepower: 550 hp
- Chassis: carbon fibre and aluminium honeycomb
- Wheelbase: 3,000 mm (118.1 in)
- Weight: 698 kg (driver included)
- Suspension: double wishbone suspension with push-rod
- Dampers: Öhlins TT44 3-Way, adjustable
- Gearbox: Xtrac, electronic, six gears
- Brakes: AP calipers with four pistons, steel discs
- Tyres: Michelin

== Championship standings ==
Scoring system

Points were awarded to the top 10 drivers in both races, regardless of whether the driver finished or not. The pole-sitter for each race received one point, and one point was also given to the driver who set the fastest lap in each race. At the end of the season, the FA1 Drivers' title was awarded to the driver with the highest number of points. There was also a Nations' championship, which grouped the represented nations by totalling the average of the points scored by the drivers of the same nationality (e.g.: with 5 Dutch drivers competing in a race, the Netherlands scored in that race the addition of the points scored by each driver divided by 5).

Sprint race points

Position	**1st**	**2nd**	**3rd**	**4th**	**5th**	**6th**	**7th**	**8th**	**9th**	**10th**	**Pole**	**FL**
Points	20	15	12	10	8	6	4	3	2	1	1	1

Feature race points

Position	**1st**	**2nd**	**3rd**	**4th**	**5th**	**6th**	**7th**	**8th**	**9th**	**10th**	**Pole**	**FL**
Points	25	18	15	12	10	8	6	4	2	1	1	1

=== Drivers' championship ===
Pos.	Driver	No.	Team	Races										Points
Pos.	Driver	No.	Team	ALG (Portugal)		NAV (Spain)		NÜR (Germany)		MNZ (Italy)		ASS (Netherlands)		Points
1	(Netherlands) Nigel Melker	7	Netherlands	2	2	**1**	1	**1**	**DNS**	2	2	**1**	1	183
2	(Italy) Mirko Bortolotti	16	Italy	**1**	**1**	2	**2**	2	1	3	11			135
3	(Slovakia) Richard Gonda	64	Slovakia	5	9	3	11	4	2	4	4	3	6	94
4	(Germany) Sebastian Balthasar	4	Germany	3	4	7	3	12	5	9	3	7	9	76
5	(Sweden) Felix Rosenqvist	23	Sweden	4	3					**1**	1			73
6	(Italy) Sergio Campana	32	France	8	7									72
6	(Italy) Sergio Campana	42	Portugal			6	12	11	3	5	**9**			72
6	(Italy) Sergio Campana	42	Italy									2	3	72
7	(Portugal) Armando Parente	42	Portugal	6	5									40
7	(Portugal) Armando Parente	29	China			9	4	5	9					40
8	(Belgium) Alessio Picariello	17	France					4	4	8	6	12	14	34
9	(Mexico) Luis Michael Dörrbecker	38	Mexico	9	10	8	5	6	8	10	7	11	12	33
10	(Spain) Dani Clos	69	United Kingdom									5	**2**	28
11	(Denmark) Dennis Lind	45	Sweden			4	7							24
11	(Denmark) Dennis Lind	45	Venezuela					9	10	7	10			24
12	(France) Nathanaël Berthon	32	France			10	10							22
12	(France) Nathanaël Berthon	32	China									4	5	22
13	(Spain) Oliver Campos-Hull	29	China	7	6									20
13	(Spain) Oliver Campos-Hull	10	Spain			11	8	7	11					20
14	(Mexico) Picho Toledano	39	Mexico	WD	WD	12	6	10	7	12	8			19
15	(United Kingdom) Craig Dolby	19	Sweden									14	4	12
16	(Sweden) Jimmy Eriksson	24	Sweden					8	6					11
17	(Venezuela) Rodolfo González	20	Venezuela	11	11	5	9							10
18	(Netherlands) Steijn Schothorst	8	China							11	5			10
19	(Spain) Marco Barba	11	Spain							6	12	13	8	10
20	(Sweden) Kevin Kleveros	22	Mexico									8	7	9
21	(Netherlands) Jeroen Mul	21	Portugal									6	13	6
22	(Spain) Victor Garcia	10	Spain	10	8									5
23	(Netherlands) Bas Schouten	6	Netherlands									9	10	3
24	(Italy) Gian Maria Gabbiani	18	Italy									10	11	1
Pos.	Driver	No.	Team	ALG (Portugal)		NAV (Spain)		NÜR (Germany)		MNZ (Italy)		ASS (Netherlands)		Points
Pos.	Driver	No.	Team	Races										Points

Colour	Result
Gold	Winner
Silver	Second place
Bronze	Third place
Green	Points classification
Blue	Non-points classification
Blue	Non-classified finish (NC)
Purple	Retired, not classified (Ret)
Red	Did not qualify (DNQ)
Red	Did not pre-qualify (DNPQ)
Black	Disqualified (DSQ)
White	Did not start (DNS)
White	Withdrew (WD)
White	Race cancelled (C)
Blank	Did not practice (DNP)
Blank	Did not arrive (DNA)
Blank	Excluded (EX)

**Bold** – Pole
Italics – Fastest Lap

=== Teams' championship ===
Pos.	Team	No.	Races										Points
Pos.	Team	No.	ALG (Portugal)		NAV (Spain)		NÜR (Germany)		MNZ (Italy)		ASS (Netherlands)		Points
1	Netherlands	6									9	10	161
1	Netherlands	7	2	2	**1**	1	**1**	**DNS**	2	2	**1**	1	161
2	Italy	16	**1**	**1**	2	**2**	2	1	3	11			150.5
2	Italy	18									10	11	150.5
2	Italy	42									2	3	150.5
3	Sweden	19									14	4	112
3	Sweden	23	4	3					**1**	1			112
3	Sweden	24					8	6					112
3	Sweden	45			4	7							112
4	Slovakia	64	5	9	3	11	4	2	4	4	3	6	94
5	Germany	4	3	4	7	3	12	5	9	3	7	9	76
6	China	8							11	5			66
6	China	29	7	6	9	4	5	9					66
6	China	32									4	5	66
7	Portugal	21									6	13	55
7	Portugal	42	6	5	6	12	11	3	5	**9**			55
8	France	17					4	4	8	6	12	14	45
8	France	32	8	7	10	10							45
9	Mexico	22									8	7	32
9	Mexico	38	9	10	8	5	6	8	10	7	11	12	32
9	Mexico	39	WD	WD	12	6	10	7	12	8			32
10	United Kingdom	69									5	**2**	28
11	Spain	10	10	8	11	8	7	11					23
11	Spain	11							6	12	13	8	23
12	Venezuela	20	11	11	5	9							18
12	Venezuela	45					9	10	7	10			18
Pos.	Driver	No.	ALG (Portugal)		NAV (Spain)		NÜR (Germany)		MNZ (Italy)		ASS (Netherlands)		Points
Pos.	Driver	No.	Races										Points

Colour	Result
Gold	Winner
Silver	Second place
Bronze	Third place
Green	Points classification
Blue	Non-points classification
Blue	Non-classified finish (NC)
Purple	Retired, not classified (Ret)
Red	Did not qualify (DNQ)
Red	Did not pre-qualify (DNPQ)
Black	Disqualified (DSQ)
White	Did not start (DNS)
White	Withdrew (WD)
White	Race cancelled (C)
Blank	Did not practice (DNP)
Blank	Did not arrive (DNA)
Blank	Excluded (EX)

**Bold** – Pole
Italics – Fastest Lap
