= 2014 European Stock 600 Series =

The 2014 European Stock 600 Series season was a motorcycle racing series that started over 2–4 May 2014 in Navarra, Spain and ended over 4–6 July at the Automotodróm Slovakia Ring, Slovakia. European Stock 600, abbreviated as ACC 600, was a part of Acceleration 2014, a series of festivals combining top class car and bike racing with music and entertainment. Next to ACC 600, there was the Formula Acceleration 1, based on the former A1 Grand Prix, the MW-V6 Pickup Series, which used modified BRL V6 cars, the Legend SuperCup, based on legends car racing, and the European Stock 1000 Series, which featured slightly faster bikes and slightly older riders than the ACC 1000. As for the music, on Friday evenings, David Hasselhoff hosted "Celebrate the 80's and the 90's with The Hoff", a dance party featuring 2 Unlimited, Haddaway, Kim Wilde, and others. Saturday evenings saw performances of international DJs.

Two different riders won the races that were held towards the championship. At Navarra, Paco Morales Aibar won ahead of Jesus Ordás Aguado and Pedro Pérez Soto. While at the Slovakia Ring, only three riders competed in the class; here, Roman Kudlik won ahead of Pavol Grman and Jozef Bielik.

== Calendar ==
The 2014 calendar consisted of two races. Originally, seven were planned. However, Acceleration in Zolder, Acceleration at Paul Ricard, and Acceleration at Grobnik were cancelled on 27 June 2014 and Acceleration at Hungaroring was cancelled on 20 August 2014. Finally, during Acceleration in Assen, the European Stock 600 Series was replaced by the national Open Wegrace Cup series, whose riders were not eligible to score points for the Acceleration championship.

Date	Event	Circuit	City
2–4 May 2014	Acceleration at Navarra	Circuito de Navarra	Navarra, Spain
4–6 Jul 2014	Acceleration at Slovakia Ring	Automotodróm Slovakia Ring	Orechová Potôň, Slovakia

== Technical specifications ==
- Engine:
  4-cylinder (401–600 cc) 4-stroke
  3-cylinder (401–675 cc) 4-stroke
  2-cylinder (401–750 cc) 4-stroke
- Minimum weight: 165 kg
- Tyres: Michelin

== Championship standings ==
Scoring system

Points were awarded to the top 15 classified riders. Riders did not have to finish to be eligible for points, but had to complete 75% of the race. At the end of the season, the ACC 600 Riders' title was awarded to the rider with the highest number of points.

Points allocation

Position	**1st**	**2nd**	**3rd**	**4th**	**5th**	**6th**	**7th**	**8th**	**9th**	**10th**	**11th**	**12th**	**13th**	**14th**	**15th**
Points	25	20	16	13	11	10	9	8	7	6	5	4	3	2	1

=== Riders' championship ===
Pos.	Rider	No.	Motorcycle	Races		Points
Pos.	Rider	No.	Motorcycle	NAV (Spain)	SVK (Slovakia)	Points
1	Paco Morales Aibar	96	Honda	**1**		25
2	Roman Kudlik	3	Yamaha		**1**	25
3	Jesus Ordás Aguado	74	Yamaha	2		20
4	Pavol Grman	13	Yamaha		2	20
5	Pedro Perez Soto	26	Yamaha	3		16
6	Jozef Bielik	27	Suzuki		3	16
7	Valentin Carroza	67	Yamaha	4		13
8	Juan Carlos Perez Tapia	93	Yamaha	5		11
9	Sergio Villar Azofra	34	Yamaha	6		10
10	Josu Nuñez Yurrita	57	Yamaha	7		9
11	Enrique Carreras Pinto	5	Yamaha	8		8
12	Aurelio Hernandez Herrera	21	Kawasaki	9		7
13	Cristina Juarranz Chamarro	19	Suzuki	10		6
14	Jose Manuel Martinez Gonzalez	33	Suzuki	11		5
15	Jorge Marcaida Zugazaga	52	Kawasaki	12		4
16	Dolors Ros Janoher	30	Yamaha	13		3
17	Joaquin Chivite Cornago	8	Kawasaki	14		2
18	Jesus Jimenez Navascues	68	Honda	15		1
–	Arkaitz Biota Llano	4	Yamaha	Ret		0
–	Miguel Garcia Gutierrez	18	Yamaha	DSQ		0
–	David Gomez Sanchez	27	Suzuki	WD		0
–	Milan Kris	36	Yamaha		WD	0
Pos.	Rider	No.	Motorcycle	NAV (Spain)	SVK (Slovakia)	Points
Pos.	Rider	No.	Motorcycle	Races		Points

Colour	Result
Gold	Winner
Silver	Second place
Bronze	Third place
Green	Points classification
Blue	Non-points classification
Blue	Non-classified finish (NC)
Purple	Retired, not classified (Ret)
Red	Did not qualify (DNQ)
Red	Did not pre-qualify (DNPQ)
Black	Disqualified (DSQ)
White	Did not start (DNS)
White	Withdrew (WD)
White	Race cancelled (C)
Blank	Did not practice (DNP)
Blank	Did not arrive (DNA)
Blank	Excluded (EX)

**Bold** – Pole
Italics – Fastest Lap
