= 2014 Legend SuperCup =

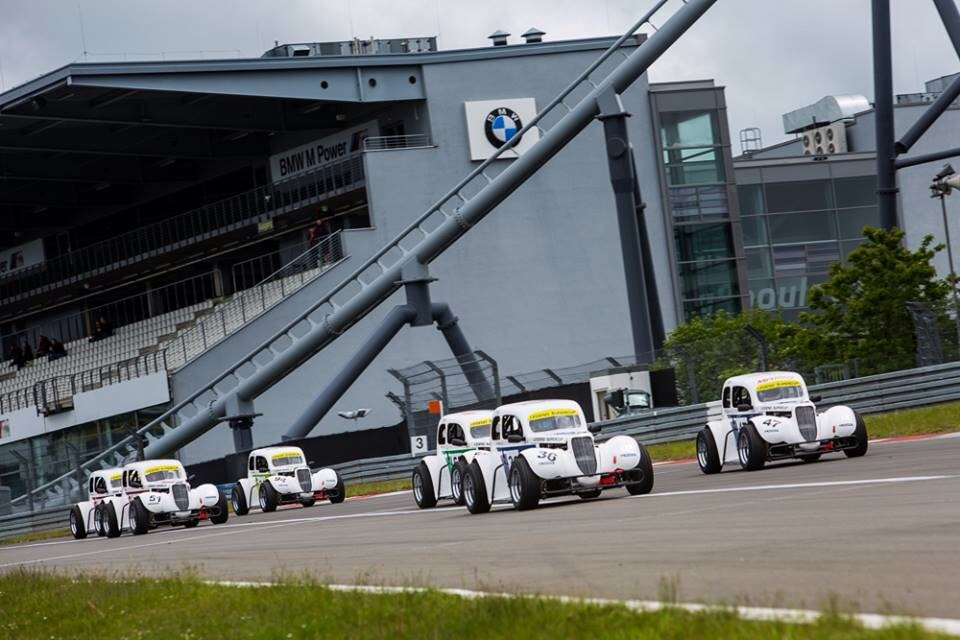
Legend Supercup during Acceleration 2014 at the Nürburgring

The 2014 Legend SuperCup season was a legends car racing series that started over 25–27 April in Portimão, Portugal and ended over 17–19 October at the TT Circuit Assen, Netherlands. Legend SuperCup (LSC) was a part of Acceleration 2014, a series of festivals combining top class car and bike racing with music and entertainment. Next to LSC, there was the Formula Acceleration 1, based on the former A1 Grand Prix, the MW-V6 Pickup Series, based on the former Dutch racing series BRL V6, and the European Stock 600 and 1000 Series, which featured motorcycle racing for 15- and 16-year-olds. To attract young, yet serious, racing drivers, the 2014 LSC drivers' champion was promised half the budget for the 2015 MW-V6 Pickup Series season plus a test day in the MW-V6 car. As for the music, on Friday evenings, David Hasselhoff hosted "Celebrate the 80's and the 90's with The Hoff", a dance party featuring 2 Unlimited, Haddaway, Kim Wilde, and others. Saturday evenings saw performances of international DJs.

The drivers' championship was won by Georgia's Davit Kajaia, after winning 11 races out of 24. Kajaia finished over 400 points clear of his closest rival and fellow Georgian, Konstantin Koliashvili. Koliashvili was the only other driver to compete in every meeting, and his best finish was a third place on two occasions. Third in the championship was Niki Meredith, who won 3 races during the season, all at the Nürburgring. Other race winners during the season were Ferry Monster, Daniel Campos-Hull, and Yannick Mettler. The nations' championship was won by Georgia, finishing over 200 points clear of the Netherlands.

On 22 December 2014, it was announced that the FA1 series would be merged with Auto GP in 2015, to ensure that at least 18 cars participate in each race. The fate of the supporting Acceleration series was not specified.

== Calendar ==
The 2014 calendar consisted of six race weekends. Originally, ten were planned. However, Acceleration in Zolder, Acceleration at Paul Ricard, and Acceleration at Grobnik were cancelled on 27 June 2014 and Acceleration at Hungaroring was cancelled on 20 August 2014.

| Date | Event | Circuit | City |
|---|---|---|---|
| 29–30 Nov 2013 | Testing | Circuito de Navarra | Navarra, Spain |
| 26–27 Mar 2014 | Testing | Circuit Ricardo Tormo | Valencia, Spain |
| 25–27 Apr 2014 | Acceleration at Portimão | Autódromo Internacional do Algarve | Portimão, Portugal |
| 2–4 May 2014 | Acceleration at Navarra | Circuito de Navarra | Navarra, Spain |
| 23–25 May 2014 | Acceleration at Nürburgring | Nürburgring | Nürburg, Germany |
| 6–8 Jun 2014 | Acceleration in Monza | Autodromo Nazionale Monza | Monza, Italy |
| 4–6 Jul 2014 | Acceleration at Slovakia Ring | Automotodróm Slovakia Ring | Orechová Potôň, Slovakia |
| 17–19 Oct 2014 | Acceleration in Assen | TT Circuit Assen | Assen, Netherlands |

== Race format ==
| Day | Duration | Event |
|---|---|---|
| Friday | 30 min | Free practice 1 |
| Friday | 30 min | Free practice 2 |
| Saturday | 20 min | Race 1 (Rolling start) |
| Saturday | 20 min | Race 2 (Rolling start) |
| Sunday | 20 min | Race 3 (Rolling start) |
| Sunday | 20 min | Race 4 (Rolling start) |

Lots were drawn by the drivers during the briefing to determine the starting grid for Sprint Race 1. The starting grid for Sprint Race 2 was the reversed Race 1 starting grid. The starting grid for Sprint Race 3 corresponded to the points scored in Races 1 and 2 (the driver who scored the highest number of points started on pole). In case of even results when adding points of races 1 and 2, the fastest lap of races 1 and 2 decided between the drivers.

== Technical specifications ==
The cars were based on those used in legends car racing.

- Engine: Fuel-injected Yamaha 1250 cc (with or without carburretor)
- Gearbox: 5-speed sequential
- Tubular frame, polyester body
- Brakes: 4 Brembo rotors, Willwood callipers
- Weight empty: 520 kg
- Length, width, height: 3.17 m, 1.52 m, 1.2 m
- Power: 136 hp at 10,000 rpm
- Acceleration: 0–100 km/h in 3.7 sec
- Top speed: 200 km/h
- Tyres: Michelin/Falken Tires

== Championship standings ==
Points allocation

Points were awarded to the top 25 classified drivers in all four races, even if the driver did not finish the race. The driver that scored the fastest lap of the weekend received one extra point. At the end of the season, the LSC Drivers' title was awarded to the driver with the highest number of points.

| Position | **1st** | **2nd** | **3rd** | **4th** | **5th** | **6th** | **7th** | **8th** | **9th** | **10th** | **11th** | **12th** | **13th** | **14th** | **15th** | **16th** | **17th** | **18th** | **19th** | **20th** | **21st** | **22nd** | **23rd** | **24th** | **25th** |
| Points | 50 | 40 | 32 | 26 | 22 | 20 | 19 | 18 | 17 | 16 | 15 | 14 | 13 | 12 | 11 | 10 | 9 | 8 | 7 | 6 | 5 | 4 | 3 | 2 | 1 |

There was also a Nations' championship, which grouped the represented nations by totalling the average of the points scored by the drivers of the same nationality (e.g.: with 5 Dutch drivers in a race, the Netherlands scored in that race the addition of the points scored by each driver divided by 5).

=== Drivers' championship ===
| Pos. | Driver | No. | Races | | | | | | | | | | | | | | | | | | | | | | | | Points |
| Pos. | Driver | No. | ALG (Portugal) | | | | NAV (Spain) | | | | NÜR (Germany) | | | | MNZ (Italy) | | | | SVK (Slovakia) | | | | ASS (Netherlands) | | | | Points |
|---|---|---|---|---|---|---|---|---|---|---|---|---|---|---|---|---|---|---|---|---|---|---|---|---|---|---|---|
| 1 | (Georgia (country)) Davit Kajaia | 47 | 2 | 1 | 2 | 2 | 3 | 9 | 1 | 1 | 1 | WD | 2 | 2 | 1 | 1 | **1** | **1** | 6 | **1** | 1 | **2** | 3 | 2 | 1 | 8 | 950 |
| 2 | (Georgia (country)) Konstantin Koliashvili | 48 | 7 | 10 | 6 | 5 | 8 | 6 | **8** | 5 | 6 | 8 | 6 | **4** | 4 | **4** | 4 | 3 | 3 | 4 | 6 | 6 | 7 | 5 | 6 | 6 | 528 |
| 3 | (Republic of Ireland) Niki Meredith | 53 | 10 | 4 | 3 | 9 | **2** | 2 | 6 | 7 | 3 | 1 | 1 | 1 | 2 | 3 | 3 | 6 | | | | | | | | | 516 |
| 4 | (Netherlands) Ferry Monster | 5 | 9 | 9 | 8 | 8 | 9 | 7 | 7 | **6** | | | | | | | | | 1 | 3 | **2** | 4 | 1 | 1 | **2** | **1** | 484 |
| 5 | (United Kingdom) James Holman | 36 | 3 | 3 | 4 | 3 | 7 | **8** | 9 | WD | **7** | 2 | 3 | WD | **3** | 2 | 2 | 2 | | | | | | | | | 421 |
| 6 | (Spain) Daniel Campos-Hull | 11 | 1 | 2 | 1 | 1 | 1 | 1 | 3 | 2 | | | | | | | | | | | | | | | | | 363 |
| 7 | (Netherlands) Johan Kraan | 44 | | | | | | | | | WD | WD | WD | 3 | 6 | 5 | 5 | 4 | **7** | 6 | 5 | 7 | | | | | 202 |
| 8 | (Netherlands) Joris Schouten | 7 | | | | | | | | | 4 | 4 | 5 | 6 | | | | | | | | | 4 | 4 | 4 | 9 | 189 |
| 9 | (Spain) Carlos Gonzalez | 10 | 5 | **5** | 5 | 6 | 6 | 5 | 4 | 8 | | | | | | | | | | | | | | | | | 172 |
| 10 | (Netherlands) Maik Barten | 20 | | | | | | | | | | | | | | | | | | | | | 2 | 3 | 3 | 2 | 144 |
| 11 | (Switzerland) Yannick Mettler | 30 | | | | | | | | | | | | | | | | | 4 | 2 | 7 | 1 | | | | | 135 |
| 12 | (United States) Jeremiah Wagner | 68 | | | | | 4 | 3 | 2 | 3 | | | | | | | | | | | | | | | | | 130 |
| 13 | (Switzerland) Giorgio Maggi | 31 | | | | | | | | | | | | | | | | | 2 | 5 | 3 | 3 | | | | | 127 |
| 14 | (Denmark) Frederik Nymark | 51 | | | | | | | | | **2** | **3** | 4 | 5 | | | | | | | | | | | | | 120 |
| 15 | (Italy) Gian Maria Gabbiani | 94 | | | | | | | | | 5 | 5 | 8 | WD | 7 | 7 | WD | WD | | | | | | | | | 100 |
| 16 | (Spain) Francesc Gutiérrez | 12 | | | | | 5 | 4 | 5 | 4 | | | | | | | | | | | | | | | | | 96 |
| 17 | (Netherlands) Cees Visser | 18 | | | | | | | | | | | | | | | | | | | | | 6 | 7 | 5 | 3 | 93 |
| 18 | (Slovakia) Samuel Sladecka | 29 | | | | | | | | | | | | | | | | | 5 | 7 | 4 | 5 | | | | | 89 |
| 19 | (United Kingdom) John Mickel | 37 | **4** | 7 | 10 | 4 | | | | | | | | | | | | | | | | | | | | | 87 |
| 20 | (Belgium) Claude Watteyene | 16 | | | | | | | | | | | | | | | | | | | | | 5 | 6 | 7 | 4 | 87 |
| 21 | (Netherlands) Jurgen Nel | 9 | | | | | | | | | | | | | 8 | 6 | 6 | 5 | | | | | | | | | 80 |
| 22 | (Netherlands) Jan-Paul van Dongen | 8 | | | | | | | | | | | | | 5 | 8 | 7 | 7 | | | | | | | | | 78 |
| 23 | (Scotland) John Paterson | 54 | 6 | 6 | 7 | 7 | | | | | | | | | | | | | | | | | | | | | 78 |
| 24 | (Netherlands) Aart Jan Ringelberg | 19 | | | | | | | | | | | | | | | | | | | | | 8 | **9** | 9 | 5 | 74 |
| 25 | (Netherlands) Frederic Cornec | 77 | | | | | | | | | | | | | | | | | | | | | **9** | 8 | 8 | 7 | 72 |
| 26 | (Denmark) Emil Andersen | 50 | 8 | 8 | **9** | **10** | | | | | | | | | | | | | | | | | | | | | 69 |
| 27 | (Italy) Luca Bettini | 15 | | | | | | | | | 9 | 6 | WD | 7 | | | | | | | | | | | | | 56 |
| 28 | (Netherlands) Leon Zappij | 6 | | | | | | | | | | 7 | **7** | WD | | | | | | | | | | | | | 38 |
| 29 | (Netherlands) Michael Verhagen | 6 | | | | | | | | | 8 | | | | | | | | | | | | | | | | 18 |
| 30 | (France) Thomas David | 42 | | | | | 10 | WD | WD | WD | | | | | | | | | | | | | | | | | 16 |
| – | (France) Fred Depresle | 14 | | | | | WD | WD | WD | WD | | | | | | | | | | | | | | | | | – |
| – | (Netherlands) Danny van Dongen | 4 | | | | | | | | | | | | | | | | | WD | WD | WD | WD | | | | | – |
| Pos. | Driver | No. | ALG (Portugal) | | | | NAV (Spain) | | | | NÜR (Germany) | | | | MNZ (Italy) | | | | SVK (Slovakia) | | | | ASS (Netherlands) | | | | Points |
| Pos. | Driver | No. | Races | | | | | | | | | | | | | | | | | | | | | | | | Points |

| Colour | Result |
|---|---|
| Gold | Winner |
| Silver | Second place |
| Bronze | Third place |
| Green | Points classification |
| Blue | Non-points classification |
| Blue | Non-classified finish (NC) |
| Purple | Retired, not classified (Ret) |
| Red | Did not qualify (DNQ) |
| Red | Did not pre-qualify (DNPQ) |
| Black | Disqualified (DSQ) |
| White | Did not start (DNS) |
| White | Withdrew (WD) |
| White | Race cancelled (C) |
| Blank | Did not practice (DNP) |
| Blank | Did not arrive (DNA) |
| Blank | Excluded (EX) |

**Bold** – Pole
Italics – Fastest Lap
Underlined – Fastest Lap of the Weekend, one extra point

=== Nations' championship ===
| Pos. | Nation | No. | Races | | | | | | | | | | | | | | | | | | | | | | | | Points |
| Pos. | Nation | No. | ALG (Portugal) | | | | NAV (Spain) | | | | NÜR (Germany) | | | | MNZ (Italy) | | | | SVK (Slovakia) | | | | ASS (Netherlands) | | | | Points |
|---|---|---|---|---|---|---|---|---|---|---|---|---|---|---|---|---|---|---|---|---|---|---|---|---|---|---|---|
| 1 | Georgia | 47 | 2 | 1 | 2 | 2 | 3 | 9 | 1 | 1 | 1 | WD | 2 | 2 | 1 | 1 | **1** | **1** | 6 | **1** | 1 | **2** | 3 | 2 | 1 | 8 | 748 |
| 1 | Georgia | 48 | 7 | 10 | 6 | 5 | 8 | 6 | **8** | 5 | 6 | 8 | 6 | **4** | 4 | **4** | 4 | 3 | 3 | 4 | 6 | 6 | 7 | 5 | 6 | 6 | 748 |
| 2 | Netherlands | 5 | 9 | 9 | 8 | 8 | 9 | 7 | 7 | **6** | | | | | | | | | 1 | 3 | **2** | 4 | 1 | 1 | **2** | **1** | 544.17 |
| 2 | Netherlands | 6 | | | | | | | | | 8 | 7 | **7** | WD | | | | | | | | | | | | | 544.17 |
| 2 | Netherlands | 7 | | | | | | | | | 4 | 4 | 5 | 6 | | | | | | | | | 4 | 4 | 4 | 9 | 544.17 |
| 2 | Netherlands | 8 | | | | | | | | | | | | | 5 | 8 | 7 | 7 | | | | | | | | | 544.17 |
| 2 | Netherlands | 9 | | | | | | | | | | | | | 8 | 6 | 6 | 5 | | | | | | | | | 544.17 |
| 2 | Netherlands | 18 | | | | | | | | | | | | | | | | | | | | | 6 | 7 | 5 | 3 | 544.17 |
| 2 | Netherlands | 19 | | | | | | | | | | | | | | | | | | | | | 8 | **9** | 9 | 4 | 544.17 |
| 2 | Netherlands | 20 | | | | | | | | | | | | | | | | | | | | | 2 | 3 | 3 | 2 | 544.17 |
| 2 | Netherlands | 44 | | | | | | | | | WD | WD | WD | 3 | 5 | 5 | 5 | 4 | **7** | 6 | 5 | 7 | | | | | 544.17 |
| 2 | Netherlands | 77 | | | | | | | | | | | | | | | | | | | | | **9** | 8 | 8 | 7 | 544.17 |
| 3 | Ireland | 53 | 10 | 4 | 3 | 9 | **2** | 2 | 6 | 7 | 3 | 1 | 1 | 1 | 2 | 3 | 3 | 6 | | | | | | | | | 516 |
| 4 | Great Britain | 36 | 3 | 3 | 4 | 3 | 7 | **8** | 9 | WD | **7** | 2 | 3 | **3** | 2 | 2 | 2 | | | | | | | | | | 402.5 |
| 4 | Great Britain | 37 | **4** | 7 | 10 | 4 | | | | | | | | | | | | | | | | | | | | | 402.5 |
| 5 | Spain | 10 | 5 | **5** | 5 | 6 | 6 | 5 | 4 | 8 | | | | | | | | | | | | | | | | | 256.33 |
| 5 | Spain | 11 | 1 | 2 | 1 | 1 | 1 | 1 | 3 | 2 | | | | | | | | | | | | | | | | | 256.33 |
| 5 | Spain | 12 | | | | | 5 | 4 | 5 | 4 | | | | | | | | | | | | | | | | | 256.33 |
| 6 | Denmark | 50 | 8 | 8 | **9** | **10** | | | | | | | | | | | | | | | | | | | | | 189 |
| 6 | Denmark | 51 | | | | | | | | | **2** | **3** | 4 | 5 | | | | | | | | | | | | | 189 |
| 7 | Switzerland | 30 | | | | | | | | | | | | | | | | | 4 | 2 | 7 | 1 | | | | | 130.5 |
| 7 | Switzerland | 31 | | | | | | | | | | | | | | | | | 2 | 5 | 3 | 3 | | | | | 130.5 |
| 8 | United States | 68 | | | | | 4 | 3 | 2 | 3 | | | | | | | | | | | | | | | | | 130 |
| 9 | Italy | 15 | | | | | | | | | 9 | 6 | WD | 7 | | | | | | | | | | | | | 96.5 |
| 9 | Italy | 94 | | | | | | | | | 5 | 5 | 8 | WD | 7 | 7 | WD | WD | | | | | | | | | 96.5 |
| 10 | Slovakia | 29 | | | | | | | | | | | | | | | | | 5 | 7 | 4 | 5 | | | | | 89 |
| 11 | Belgium | 16 | | | | | | | | | | | | | | | | | | | | | 5 | 6 | 7 | 4 | 87 |
| 12 | Scotland | 54 | 6 | 6 | 7 | 7 | | | | | | | | | | | | | | | | | | | | | 78 |
| 13 | France | 42 | | | | | 10 | WD | WD | WD | | | | | | | | | | | | | | | | | 16 |
| Pos. | Driver | No. | ALG (Portugal) | | | | NAV (Spain) | | | | NÜR (Germany) | | | | MNZ (Italy) | | | | SVK (Slovakia) | | | | ASS (Netherlands) | | | | Points |
| Pos. | Driver | No. | Races | | | | | | | | | | | | | | | | | | | | | | | | Points |

| Colour | Result |
|---|---|
| Gold | Winner |
| Silver | Second place |
| Bronze | Third place |
| Green | Points classification |
| Blue | Non-points classification |
| Blue | Non-classified finish (NC) |
| Purple | Retired, not classified (Ret) |
| Red | Did not qualify (DNQ) |
| Red | Did not pre-qualify (DNPQ) |
| Black | Disqualified (DSQ) |
| White | Did not start (DNS) |
| White | Withdrew (WD) |
| White | Race cancelled (C) |
| Blank | Did not practice (DNP) |
| Blank | Did not arrive (DNA) |
| Blank | Excluded (EX) |

**Bold** – Pole
Italics – Fastest Lap
Underlined – Fastest Lap of the Weekend, one extra point
