= Alfonso Toledano Jr. =

Mexican racing driver

Alfonso ("Picho") Toledano Jr. (Mexico City, 18 Aug 1989) is a Mexican racing driver. He is the son of Alfonso Toledano, former Formula 3 driver.

== Career ==
Toledano started his racing career in karting. In 2003, he was second in the 100cc class, beating among others future Formula One driver Sergio Pérez. The year after, he became champion. 2005 saw his debut in formula racing; he became tenth in Formula Renault Campus.

In 2006, Toledano switched to the Panam GP Series and finished thirteenth. He also drove three out of five races of the International Formula Challenge, which got him to a seventh place in the championship. His 2007 Panam GP season was more successful; he scored two victories, which led to a third place in championship. However, in the fall of 2007, Toledano had a severe racing accident. It happened during a pre-season test for A1 Team Mexico in Ponce, Puerto Rico. Toledano entered a blind corner at high speed and lost his brakes before impacting another car, which had come to a full stop due to a previous incident. Both of Toledano's legs sustained multiple fractures.

After eighteen surgeries and ten months of being immobile, Toledano tried his hand at Formula BMW. He ran four races in the Formula BMW USA and two races in the Formula BMW Pacific Series in order to prepare for the 2008 World Final at the Autodromo Hermanos Rodriguez in Mexico City. He finished sixteenth.

After this, Toledano did not race until 2011, when he did a few pre-season GP3 Series tests. He fully returned to racing in 2012, when he joined the Panam GP Series, finishing fifteenth and thirteenth in the first two races of the year. In 2013, he was eighteenth in the summer and fourteenth in the winter championship of Panam GP.

The following year, he made a switch to Formula Acceleration 1, part of Acceleration 2014, driving for Acceleration Team Mexico. He is currently twelfth in the championship.
