= 2014 MW-V6 Pickup Series =

The 2014 MW-V6 Pickup Series season was a pickup truck racing series that started over 25–27 April in Portimão, Portugal and ended over 17–19 October at the TT Circuit Assen, Netherlands. MW-V6 was a part of Acceleration 2014, a series of festivals combining top class car and bike racing with music and entertainment. Next to MW-V6, there was the Formula Acceleration 1, based on the former A1 Grand Prix, the Legend SuperCup, based on legends car racing, and the European Stock 600 and 1000 Series, which featured motorcycle racing for 15- and 16-year-olds. To attract young, yet serious, racing drivers, the 2014 MW-V6 winning driver was promised half the budget for the 2015 FA1 season and a test day in the FA1 car, or the full budget for the 2015 MW-V6 season plus an FA1 test. As for the music, on Friday evenings, David Hasselhoff hosted "Celebrate the 80's and the 90's with The Hoff", a dance party featuring 2 Unlimited, Haddaway, Kim Wilde, and others. Saturday evenings saw performances of international DJs.

The drivers' championship was won by Danny van Dongen, after he won seven races during the season. He had trailed Eoin Murray by five points after four meetings, but Murray did not contest the final two meetings. This resulted in van Dongen winning the championship by 122 points. Murray, with five wins, still amassed enough points to finish as the championship runner-up, while Alx Danielsson finished third in the series, eight points in arrears of Murray. Danielsson was a two-time race winner at Portimão, while three other drivers took race victories during the season; Jacky van der Ende won twice at the Nürburgring, Daniël de Jong was a race winner at Assen, while Davit Kajaia took a race victory at the Slovakia Ring. The nations' championship was won by the Netherlands, finishing 32.63 points clear of Sweden.

On 22 December 2014, it was announced that the FA1 series would be merged with Auto GP in 2015, to ensure that at least 18 cars participate in each race. The fate of the supporting Acceleration series was not specified.

== Calendar ==
The 2014 calendar consisted of six race weekends. Originally, ten were planned. However, Acceleration in Zolder, Acceleration at Paul Ricard, and Acceleration at Grobnik were cancelled on 27 June 2014 and Acceleration at Hungaroring was cancelled on 20 August 2014.

| Date | Event | Circuit | City |
|---|---|---|---|
| 29–30 Nov 2013 | Testing | Circuito de Navarra | Navarra, Spain |
| 26–27 Mar 2014 | Testing | Circuit Ricardo Tormo | Valencia, Spain |
| 10 Apr 2014 | Testing | Circuit Park Zandvoort | Zandvoort, Netherlands |
| 25–27 Apr 2014 | Acceleration at Portimão | Autódromo Internacional do Algarve | Portimão, Portugal |
| 2–4 May 2014 | Acceleration at Navarra | Circuito de Navarra | Navarra, Spain |
| 23–25 May 2014 | Acceleration at Nürburgring | Nürburgring | Nürburg, Germany |
| 6–8 Jun 2014 | Acceleration in Monza | Autodromo Nazionale Monza | Monza, Italy |
| 4–6 Jul 2014 | Acceleration at Slovakia Ring | Automotodróm Slovakia Ring | Orechová Potôň, Slovakia |
| 17–19 Oct 2014 | Acceleration in Assen | TT Circuit Assen | Assen, Netherlands |

=== Race format ===
| Day | Duration | Event |
|---|---|---|
| Friday | 30 min | Free practice 1 |
| Friday | 30 min | Free practice 2 |
| Friday | 20 min | Qualifying for race 1 |
| Saturday | 20 min | Qualifying for race 2 |
| Saturday | 25 min | Race 1 (Rolling start) |
| Saturday | 25 min | Race 2 (Rolling start) |
| Sunday | 40 min | Race 3 (Rolling start and mandatory pitstop) |

The starting order of race 3 was decided by a combined result of Q1 and Q2 with the first 8 reversed.

== Technical specifications ==
The cars were based on those used in the Dutch racing series BRL V6 and BRL Light.

- Engine: 4.0L V6 Ford, 325 hp
- Gearbox: Drenth DG 400
- Minimum weight: 950 kg
- Tyres: Michelin

== Championship standings ==
Scoring system

Points were awarded to the top 10 classified finishers in all three races. The pole-sitter for race 1 and 2 received one point, and one point was also given to the driver who set the fastest lap in each race. At the end of the season, the MW-V6 Drivers' title was awarded to the driver with the highest number of points.

Points allocation for race 1 and 2

| Position | **1st** | **2nd** | **3rd** | **4th** | **5th** | **6th** | **7th** | **8th** | **9th** | **10th** | **Pole** | **FL** |
| Points | 20 | 15 | 12 | 10 | 8 | 6 | 4 | 3 | 2 | 1 | 1 | 1 |

Points allocation for race 3

| Position | **1st** | **2nd** | **3rd** | **4th** | **5th** | **6th** | **7th** | **8th** | **9th** | **10th** | **FL** |
| Points | 25 | 18 | 15 | 12 | 10 | 8 | 6 | 4 | 2 | 1 | 1 |

There was also a Nations' championship, which grouped the represented nations by totalling the average of the points scored by the drivers of the same nationality (e.g.: with 5 Dutch drivers competing in a race, the Netherlands scored in that race the addition of the points scored by each driver divided by 5).

=== Drivers' championship ===
| Pos. | No. | Driver | Races | | | | | | | | | | | | | | | | | | Points |
| Pos. | No. | Driver | ALG (Portugal) | | | NAV (Spain) | | | NÜR (Germany) | | | MNZ (Italy) | | | SVK (Slovakia) | | | ASS (Netherlands) | | | Points |
|---|---|---|---|---|---|---|---|---|---|---|---|---|---|---|---|---|---|---|---|---|---|
| 1 | 4 | (Netherlands) Danny van Dongen | 9 | 2 | 11 | 2 | 4 | 3 | 1 | 5 | 4 | 3 | **1** | 1 | **2** | **1** | 1 | 1 | **2** | 1 | 282 |
| 2 | 44 | (Republic of Ireland) Eoin Murray | 11 | **1** | 2 | **1** | **1** | 1 | 13 | **11** | DNS | **1** | 3 | 3 | | | | | | | 160 |
| 3 | 23 | (Sweden) Alx Danielsson | **1** | 10 | 1 | WD | 2 | 2 | 5 | 2 | 8 | | | | | | | 3 | 3 | 2 | 152 |
| 4 | 80 | (Netherlands) Daniël de Jong | 10 | 5 | 4 | | | | | | | | | | | | | **2** | 1 | 4 | 70 |
| 5 | 87 | (Netherlands) Jacky van der Ende | | | | | | | 2 | 1 | 1 | | | | | | | | | | 61 |
| 6 | 10 | (Spain) Carlos Alvarez | 3 | 3 | 3 | 9 | 10 | 5 | | | | | | | | | | | | | 52 |
| 7 | 16 | (Italy) Giacomo Ricci | | | | | | | | | | 2 | 2 | 2 | | | | | | | 51 |
| 8 | 47 | (Georgia (country)) Davit Kajaia | | | | | | | | | | | | | 1 | 2 | 3 | | | | 50 |
| 9 | 90 | (Netherlands) Pim van Riet | | | | | | | 4 | 3 | 2 | | | | | | | | | | 41 |
| 10 | 41 | (Netherlands) Bas Koeten | 5 | 6 | 8 | | | | | | | | | | 5 | | 4 | | | | 38 |
| 11 | 83 | (Spain) Mikel Azcona | | | | 3 | 3 | 4 | | | | | | | | | | | | | 36 |
| 12 | 17 | (Netherlands) Niels Bouwhuis | | | | | | | | | | | | | | | | 4 | 4 | **3** | 35 |
| 13 | 93 | (Netherlands) Jan-Paul van Dongen | | | | | | | 8 | 6 | 10 | 5 | 5 | 6 | | | | | | | 34 |
| 14 | 7 | (Netherlands) Leon Rijnbeek | 8 | 8 | 9 | | | | 10 | 8 | 7 | 7 | 6 | **8** | | | | | | | 32 |
| 15 | 9 | (Netherlands) Kelvin Snoeks | 2 | 4 | 7 | | | | | | | | | | | | | | | | 31 |
| 16 | 6 | (Germany) Andreas Gulden | | | | | | | 6 | 4 | 3 | | | | | | | | | | 31 |
| 17 | 30 | (Slovakia) Filip Sladecka | | | | | | | | | | | | | 6 | 6 | 2 | | | | 30 |
| 18 | 5 | (Austria) Bernd Herndlhofer | | | | | | | | | | 4 | 4 | 5 | | | | | | | 30 |
| 19 | 92 | (Belgium) Fréderique Jonckheere | | | | | | | 3 | 7 | 5 | | | | | | | | | | 26 |
| 20 | 32 | (Czech Republic) Christian Malchárek | | | | | | | | | | | | | 3 | 7 | 5 | | | | 26 |
| 21 | 31 | (Hungary) Attila Barta | | | | | | | | | | | | | 7 | 3 | 6 | | | | 24 |
| 22 | 8 | (Netherlands) Bas Schouten | | | | 5 | 5 | **7** | **14** | 12 | **11** | | | | | | | | | | 23 |
| 23 | 94 | (Italy) Gian Maria Gabbiani | | | | | | | 7 | WD | WD | 8 | 8 | 4 | | | | | | | 22 |
| 24 | 88 | (Netherlands) Priscilla Speelman | | | | | | | 9 | 10 | 9 | 6 | 7 | 7 | | | | | | | 21 |
| 25 | 50 | (Denmark) Tom Pedersen | 4 | 11 | 5 | | | | | | | | | | | | | | | | 20 |
| 26 | 18 | (Belgium) Erik Qvick | | | | | | | | | | | | | | | | 6 | 5 | 7 | 20 |
| 27 | 48 | (Georgia (country)) Konstantine Koliashvili | | | | | | | | | | | | | 4 | 5 | WD | | | | 18 |
| 28 | 8 | (Netherlands) Bert de Heus | 12 | 9 | 10 | | | | | | | | | | | | | 9 | 9 | 5 | 17 |
| 29 | 68 | (United States) Jeremiah Wagner | | | | 4 | 9 | 8 | | | | | | | | | | | | | 16 |
| 30 | 19 | (Netherlands) Johan Kraan | | | | | | | | | | | | | | | | 5 | 6 | 9 | 16 |
| 31 | 85 | (Spain) Javier Morcillo | | | | 7 | 8 | 6 | | | | | | | | | | | | | 15 |
| 32 | 12 | (Netherlands) Joey Affolter | | | | | | | | | | | | | | | | 8 | 8 | 6 | 14 |
| 33 | 35 | (United Kingdom) John Mickel | 7 | 12 | 6 | | | | | | | | | | | | | | | | 12 |
| 34 | 16 | (Netherlands) Herman Peene | | | | | | | | | | | | | | | | 7 | 7 | 8 | 12 |
| 35 | 45 | (Republic of Ireland) Michael Devaney | | | | 6 | 7 | 10 | | | | | | | | | | | | | 11 |
| 36 | 12 | (Spain) Francesc Gutiérrez | | | | 8 | 6 | 9 | | | | | | | | | | | | | 11 |
| 37 | 41 | (Netherlands) Michel Schaap | | | | | | | | | | | | | | 4 | | | | | 10 |
| 38 | 14 | (Netherlands) Maik Barten | 6 | 7 | WD | | | | | | | | | | | | | | | | 10 |
| 39 | 24 | (Sweden) Will Wright | | | | | | | 12 | 9 | 6 | | | | | | | | | | 10 |
| 40 | 17 | (Italy) Alberto Cola | | | | | | | | | | 9 | WD | WD | | | | | | | 2 |
| 41 | 84 | (Spain) Joaquin Egozkcue de los Santos | | | | 10 | 11 | WD | | | | | | | | | | | | | 1 |
| 42 | 96 | (Belgium) Ward Sluys (Netherlands) Fred Cavanagh | | | | | | | 11 | WD | WD | | | | | | | | | | 0 |
| 43 | 11 | (Spain) Christian Cano | 13 | WD | **12** | | | | | | | | | | | | | | | | 0 |
| – | 95 | (Netherlands) Melvin de Groot (Belgium) Steve van Bellingen | | | | | | | WD | WD | WD | | | | | | | | | | – |
| – | 33 | (Slovakia) Lubomir Jakubik | | | | | | | | | | | | | WD | WD | **WD** | | | | – |
| – | 99 | (Netherlands) Huub Delnoij | | | | | | | | | | | | | | | | WD | WD | WD | – |
| Pos. | No. | Driver | ALG (Portugal) | | | NAV (Spain) | | | NÜR (Germany) | | | MNZ (Italy) | | | SVK (Slovakia) | | | ASS (Netherlands) | | | Points |
| Pos. | No. | Driver | Races | | | | | | | | | | | | | | | | | | Points |

| Colour | Result |
|---|---|
| Gold | Winner |
| Silver | Second place |
| Bronze | Third place |
| Green | Points classification |
| Blue | Non-points classification |
| Blue | Non-classified finish (NC) |
| Purple | Retired, not classified (Ret) |
| Red | Did not qualify (DNQ) |
| Red | Did not pre-qualify (DNPQ) |
| Black | Disqualified (DSQ) |
| White | Did not start (DNS) |
| White | Withdrew (WD) |
| White | Race cancelled (C) |
| Blank | Did not practice (DNP) |
| Blank | Did not arrive (DNA) |
| Blank | Excluded (EX) |

**Bold** – Pole
Italics – Fastest Lap

=== Nations' championship ===
| Pos. | Nation | No. | Races | | | | | | | | | | | | | | | | | | Points |
| Pos. | Nation | No. | ALG (Portugal) | | | NAV (Spain) | | | NÜR (Germany) | | | MNZ (Italy) | | | SVK (Slovakia) | | | ASS (Netherlands) | | | Points |
|---|---|---|---|---|---|---|---|---|---|---|---|---|---|---|---|---|---|---|---|---|---|
| 1 | The Netherlands | 4 | 9 | 2 | 11 | 2 | 4 | 3 | 1 | 5 | 4 | 3 | **1** | 1 | **2** | **1** | 1 | 1 | **2** | 1 | 175.63 |
| 1 | The Netherlands | 7 | 8 | 8 | 9 | | | | 10 | 8 | 7 | 7 | 6 | **8** | | | | | | | 175.63 |
| 1 | The Netherlands | 8 | 12 | 9 | 10 | 5 | 5 | **7** | **14** | 12 | **11** | | | | | | | 9 | 9 | 5 | 175.63 |
| 1 | The Netherlands | 9 | 2 | 4 | 7 | | | | | | | | | | | | | | | | 175.63 |
| 1 | The Netherlands | 12 | | | | | | | | | | | | | | | | 8 | 8 | 6 | 175.63 |
| 1 | The Netherlands | 14 | 6 | 7 | WD | | | | | | | | | | | | | | | | 175.63 |
| 1 | The Netherlands | 16 | | | | | | | | | | | | | | | | 7 | 7 | 8 | 175.63 |
| 1 | The Netherlands | 17 | | | | | | | | | | | | | | | | 4 | 4 | **3** | 175.63 |
| 1 | The Netherlands | 19 | | | | | | | | | | | | | | | | 5 | 6 | 9 | 175.63 |
| 1 | The Netherlands | 41 | 5 | 6 | 8 | | | | | | | | | | 5 | 4 | 4 | | | | 175.63 |
| 1 | The Netherlands | 80 | 10 | 5 | 4 | | | | | | | | | | | | | **2** | 1 | 4 | 175.63 |
| 1 | The Netherlands | 87 | | | | | | | 2 | 1 | 1 | | | | | | | | | | 175.63 |
| 1 | The Netherlands | 88 | | | | | | | 9 | 10 | 9 | 6 | 7 | 7 | | | | | | | 175.63 |
| 1 | The Netherlands | 90 | | | | | | | 4 | 3 | 2 | | | | | | | | | | 175.63 |
| 1 | The Netherlands | 93 | | | | | | | 8 | 6 | 10 | 5 | 5 | 6 | | | | | | | 175.63 |
| 1 | The Netherlands | 95 | | | | | | | WD | WD | WD | | | | | | | | | | 175.63 |
| 1 | The Netherlands | 99 | | | | | | | | | | | | | | | | WD | WD | WD | 175.63 |
| 2 | Sweden | 23 | **1** | 10 | 1 | WD | 2 | 2 | 5 | 2 | 8 | | | | | | | 3 | 3 | 2 | 143 |
| 2 | Sweden | 24 | | | | | | | 12 | 9 | 6 | | | | | | | | | | 143 |
| 3 | Ireland | 44 | 11 | **1** | 2 | **1** | **1** | 1 | 13 | **11** | DNS | **1** | 3 | 3 | | | | | | | 130.5 |
| 3 | Ireland | 45 | | | | 6 | 7 | 10 | | | | | | | | | | | | | 130.5 |
| 4 | Spain | 10 | 3 | 3 | 3 | 9 | 10 | 5 | | | | | | | | | | | | | 42.3 |
| 4 | Spain | 11 | 13 | WD | **12** | | | | | | | | | | | | | | | | 42.3 |
| 4 | Spain | 12 | | | | 8 | 6 | 9 | | | | | | | | | | | | | 42.3 |
| 4 | Spain | 83 | | | | 3 | 3 | 4 | | | | | | | | | | | | | 42.3 |
| 4 | Spain | 84 | | | | 10 | 11 | WD | | | | | | | | | | | | | 42.3 |
| 4 | Spain | 85 | | | | 7 | 8 | 6 | | | | | | | | | | | | | 42.3 |
| 5 | Georgia | 47 | | | | | | | | | | | | | 1 | 2 | 3 | | | | 41.5 |
| 5 | Georgia | 48 | | | | | | | | | | | | | 4 | 5 | WD | | | | 41.5 |
| 6 | Belgium | 18 | | | | | | | | | | | | | | | | 6 | 5 | 7 | 40 |
| 6 | Belgium | 92 | | | | | | | 3 | 7 | 5 | | | | | | | | | | 40 |
| 6 | Belgium | 96 | | | | | | | 11 | WD | WD | | | | | | | | | | 40 |
| 7 | Italy | 16 | | | | | | | | | | 2 | 2 | 2 | | | | | | | 35.5 |
| 7 | Italy | 17 | | | | | | | | | | 9 | WD | WD | | | | | | | 35.5 |
| 7 | Italy | 94 | | | | | | | 7 | WD | WD | 8 | 8 | 4 | | | | | | | 35.5 |
| 8 | Germany | 6 | | | | | | | 6 | 4 | 3 | | | | | | | | | | 31 |
| 9 | Slovakia | 30 | | | | | | | | | | | | | 6 | 6 | 2 | | | | 30 |
| 9 | Slovakia | 33 | | | | | | | | | | | | | WD | WD | **WD** | | | | 30 |
| 10 | Austria | 5 | | | | | | | | | | 4 | 4 | 5 | | | | | | | 30 |
| 11 | Czech Republic | 32 | | | | | | | | | | | | | 3 | 7 | 5 | | | | 26 |
| 12 | Hungary | 31 | | | | | | | | | | | | | 7 | 3 | 6 | | | | 24 |
| 13 | Denmark | 50 | 4 | 11 | 5 | | | | | | | | | | | | | | | | 20 |
| 14 | Great Britain | 35 | 7 | 12 | 6 | | | | | | | | | | | | | | | | 12 |
| Pos. | Nation | No. | ALG (Portugal) | | | NAV (Spain) | | | NÜR (Germany) | | | MNZ (Italy) | | | SVK (Slovakia) | | | ASS (Netherlands) | | | Points |
| Pos. | Nation | No. | Races | | | | | | | | | | | | | | | | | | Points |

| Colour | Result |
|---|---|
| Gold | Winner |
| Silver | Second place |
| Bronze | Third place |
| Green | Points classification |
| Blue | Non-points classification |
| Blue | Non-classified finish (NC) |
| Purple | Retired, not classified (Ret) |
| Red | Did not qualify (DNQ) |
| Red | Did not pre-qualify (DNPQ) |
| Black | Disqualified (DSQ) |
| White | Did not start (DNS) |
| White | Withdrew (WD) |
| White | Race cancelled (C) |
| Blank | Did not practice (DNP) |
| Blank | Did not arrive (DNA) |
| Blank | Excluded (EX) |

**Bold** – Pole
Italics – Fastest Lap
