= Racepark Meppen =

Racing circuit near Meppen, Germany

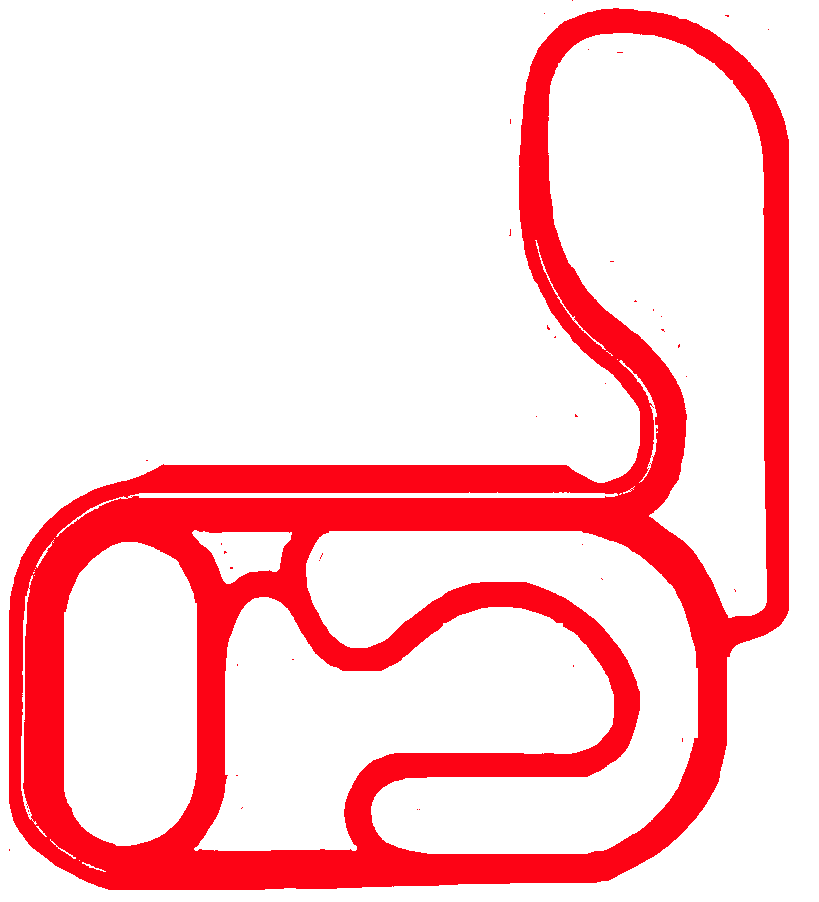
- Location: Meppen, Lower Saxony, Germany
- Coordinates: 52°45′15″N 7°16′44″E
- Owner: Harry Maessen
- Operator: Racepark Meppen Management GmbH
- Broke ground: 2008
- Opened: 18 June 2016; 9 years ago
- Major events: 12H Meppen

Circuit
- Surface: Asphalt
- Length: 2.15 km (1.34 mi)
- Turns: 10

1-km Oval
- Surface: Asphalt
- Length: 1.00 km (0.62 mi)
- Turns: 4

Short Oval
- Surface: Asphalt
- Length: 0.40 km (0.25 mi)
- Turns: 4

Racepark Meppen is a racing circuit located near Meppen, Lower Saxony, Germany. The racetrack is located on the grounds of the former Kraftwerk Meppen-Hüntel energy plant. The first event was run on 18 June 2016.

== History ==
Dutch entrepreneur Hennie van der Most bought 60 hectare of the former Kraftwerk Meppen-Hüntel power plant in 2004, four years after its closure. Van der Most planned to build an automotive theme park with a racetrack. The opening was scheduled for 2009. If the park was not opened in 2009 the Emsland municipality could claim €1,286,000 from Van der Most. Initially the opening was scheduled in the first half of 2008. However, the 2008 financial crisis halted construction in August 2008. The first races of the BRL V6 and BRL Light which were scheduled in 2009, had to be rescheduled. Van der Most reached an agreement with the municipality to postpone the opening of the Funpark to 2015.

In 2014, 20 acres of the Funpark Meppen were bought by Harry Maessen, owner of Raceway Venray, to develop the racing circuit. The new configuration would include a racetrack, as well as a 1 kilometer and a 400-meter oval track. In July 2015 the track was paved and races for 2016 were announced. Two months later, the first cars were taken to the track to test the new layout.

In February 2016 it was announced that the Touring Car Endurance Series would host a 12-hour endurance race, 12H Meppen, at the German track. Due to the installation of noise monitoring equipment at Race Park Meppen, and by too few participant, CREVENTIC and Race Park Meppen have jointly decided to postpone the 2016 Hankook 12H MEPPEN, a twelve-hour race for touring cars, scheduled for September 23–24, 2016, to a date that will be announced in due time.
