= Bas Schouten =

Dutch racing driver

- Nationality: (Netherlands) Dutch
- Born: October 19, 1994 (age 32) Hoorn, Netherlands
- Relatives: Dirk Schouten (cousin)

Previous series
- 2014 2014 2013 2012 2010-2012 2010: MW-V6 Pickup Series; Dutch Supercar Challenge Super GT; Dutch Supercar Challenge Supersport; Benelux Radical Cup; Dutch Formula Ford Championship; BMW E30 Cup

Awards
- 2010: KNAF Talent First

Bas Schouten (born 19 October 1994 in Hoorn) is a Dutch auto racing driver. Schouten has raced in various international racing series such as the TCR International Series and Acceleration 2014.

== Career ==
After a career in karting in his home country, Schouten made his auto racing debut in 2010. He was included in the KNAF Talent First programme together with Steijn Schothorst and Dennis van de Laar. De 15-year-old Dutch driver ran in the amateur BMW E30 Cup in a BMW 325i E30 entered by Bas Koeten Racing. Schouten also ran six races in the Dutch Formula Ford Duratec championship. The best result for Schouten was fifth at Circuit Park Zandvoort. The following year, Schouten finished third in the Formula Ford championship. At the annual Formula Ford Festival Schouten finished eighth out of 25 drivers. In 2012, he raced in the Formula Ford and the Benelux Radical SR3 Cup. In the Radical Cup Schouten ended up in the runner-up position in the championship.

For 2013, Schouten turned to GT racing. He drove a full season in the Dutch Supercar Challenge Supersport division in a BMW 1 Series GTR. Schouten shared the car with other Dutch drivers such as Jeroen Mul and Joey van Splunteren. Schouten finished third in the championship. The following year, he raced in the Dutch Supercar Challenge Super GT class. Schouten raced in a Vicora V8, a car derived from the Chevrolet Corvette, entered by Raceway Venray. Running only a partial season, Schouten also raced six races in the MW-V6 Pickup Series. At 2014 Acceleration at Navarra, Schouten finished fifth in the first two races. He also made return to single seater racing in the Formula Acceleration 1 at Assen. Racing for Acceleration Team Netherlands, Schouten finished both races in the top-ten.

== Racing record ==
=== Complete Formula Acceleration 1 results ===
(key) (Races in bold indicate pole position) (Races in italics indicate fastest lap)

Year	Team	1	2	3	4	5	6	7	8	9	10	Pos	Points
2014	Netherlands	ALG; 1	ALG; 2	NAV; 1	NAV; 2	NÜR; 1	NÜR; 2	MNZ; 1	MNZ; 2	ASS; 1; 9	ASS; 2; 10	**23rd**	**3**

=== Complete TCR International Series results ===
(key) (Races in bold indicate pole position) (Races in italics indicate fastest lap)

Year	Team	Car	1	2	3	4	5	6	7	8	9	10	11	12	13	14	15	16	17	18	19	20	21	22	DC	Points
2015	Bas Koeten Racing	SEAT León Cup Racer	MYS; 1	MYS; 2	CHN; 1	CHN; 2	ESP; 1; 9	ESP; 2; 8†	POR; 1	POR; 2	ITA; 1	ITA; 2	AUT; 1; 9	AUT; 2; 9	RUS; 1	RUS; 2	RBR; 1	RBR; 2	SIN; 1	SIN; 2	THA; 1	THA; 2	MAC; 1	MAC; 2	25th	10

^{†} Driver did not finish the race, but was classified as he completed over 90% of the race distance.
