= Andrew Varona =

American race car driver

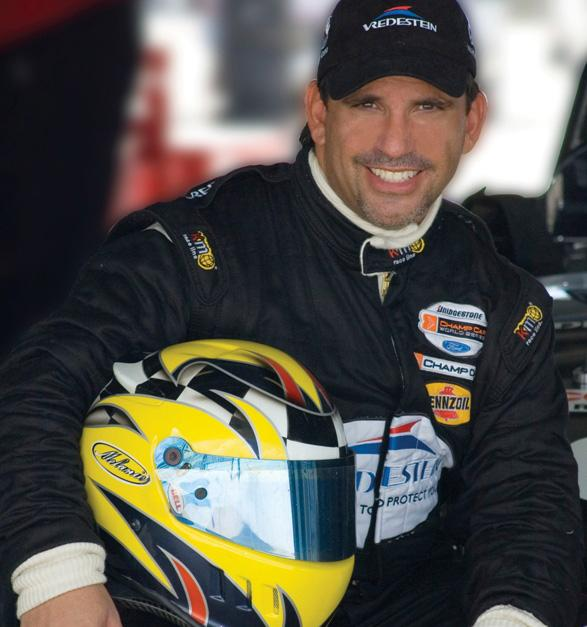
Andrew Varona - Race Car Driver

Andrew Varona is an American auto racing driver.

== Early life and education ==
Andrew Varona was born in Louisiana. He graduated with an undergraduate degree in political science and received his J.D. degree in 1997.

== Karting ==
Debuting in karting in 2000, Varona finished second in the Monaco Kart Cup in Formula A in 2000, and third in the Spanish Elite Championship. Since starting to race cars, Varona has continued to compete in karts.

== Racing career ==
Varona started his racing career in 2000 and soon won the Monaco Kart Cup. In 2009, he began racing on the Formula Atlantic circuit and placed first in points for the FARA Open Wheel that year. In 2011, he began racing for Argent Racing on the Le Mans Series. Between 2012 and 2013, Varona placed first in nine races between the ALMS, FARA, and A1GP circuits. He continued to race, and performed on the European Le Mans Series circuit in 2018. In 2019, Varona placed first in points in the FP-1 Spring Championship. Varona has also worked as a sportscaster for Mundo Fox.

== Sports cars ==
In 2006, Andrew Varona started in sports car racing, contesting the LMP2 class of the Le Mans Series and 24 Hours of Le Mans for Vredestein Racing Group. After his brief return to single-seaters in 2008, he raced in nine events and finished fifth in the Le Mans Series LMP2 drivers' standings and third in class at Le Mans. In 2009, Andrew Varona started his relationship with the Bacardi racing team. They finished 11th overall, tenth in LMP1 at the 2009 24 Hours of Le Mans, and seventh in the Le Mans Series. Varona switched to a Lola-Aston Martin B09/60 for 2010, and the team finished second in the LMS teams' championship with their drivers in fourth place. In 2011, Andrew Varona switched back to the Vredestein Racing team. He finished tenth overall and fourth in LMP2 at the 2011 24 Hours of Le Mans.

== Formula 3000 ==
In 2007, Varona joined Alliance Racing and won four races with the Euroseries 3000 championship with two top-five finishes.

== A1 GP ==
Varona drove in 11 races in 2008–2010 for RPM Racing. He was promoted to be their top racing driver for the end of the season. The team issued a statement at the end of the season that he should be driving the entire 2011 season.

== European Le Mans Series ==
In 2009, he participated in the European Le Mans Series for the Arco Racing Team alongside Ben Johnston. Since 2010, he has been racing in the European Le Mans Series.

== FARA ==
Varona and Danny van Dongen won the 2019 & 2020 Championship in the P2 Prototype Series of the FARA Sport Prototype Championship.
