= Davit Kajaia =

Georgian racing driver (born 1984)

Data Kajaia
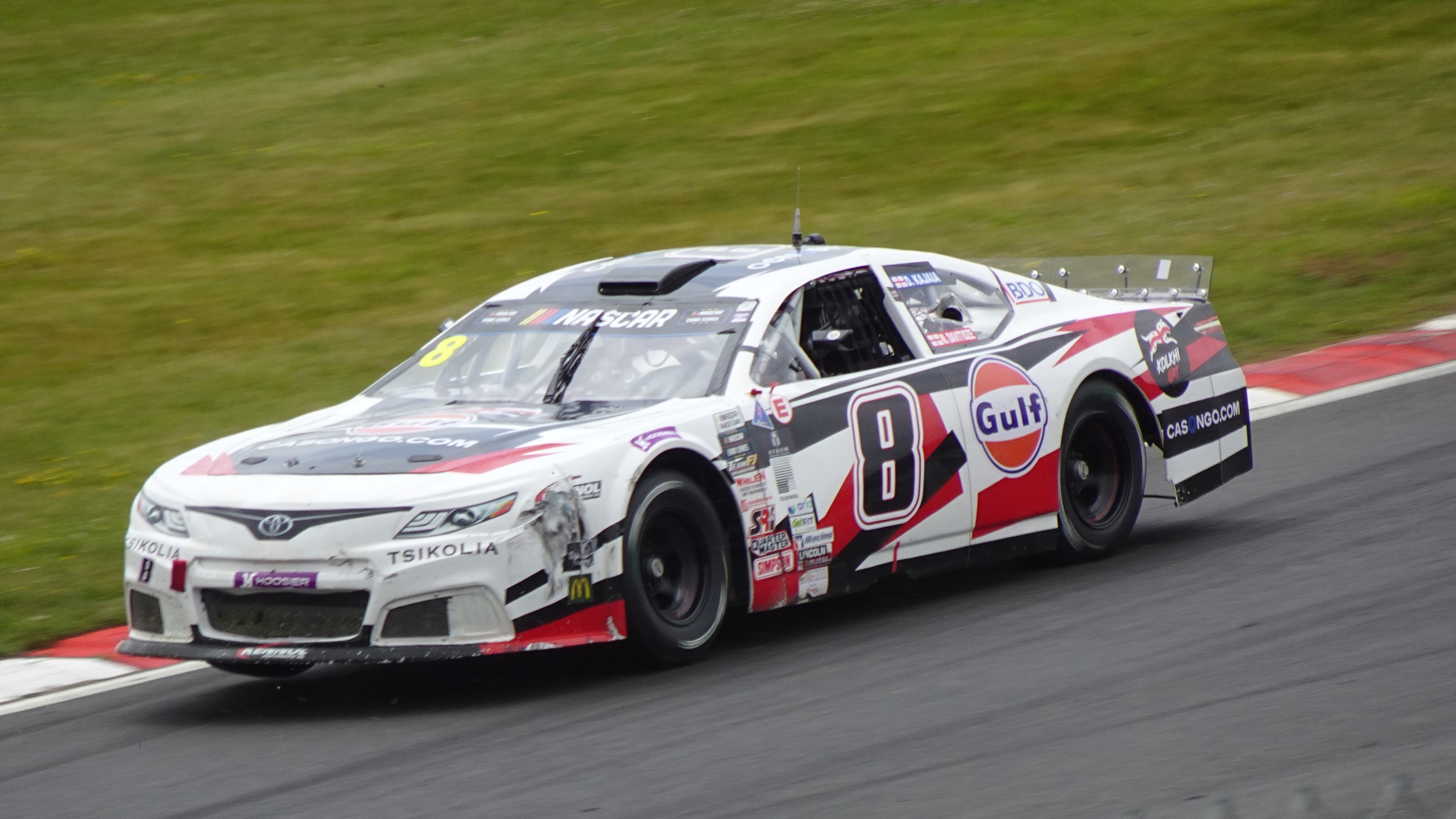
- Kajaia racing at Brands Hatch in 2026
- Nationality: Georgian
- Born: 10 January 1984 (age 42) Tbilisi (Georgia)

Legends Cars career
- Debut season: 2011 Rustavi Pre-Opening Race
- Current team: MIA Force
- Car number: 20

Previous series
- 2005-2011 2006-2011 2007 2007-2008 2011-2013: Georgian Speed Slalom; Georgian Pair Racing; Georgian Rally Championship; Georgian Touring Series; Georgian Legends Championship

Championship titles
- 2012,2013 2013 2014 2014 2015: Legends Euro Nations Cup; Georgian Legends Championship; European Legends SuperCup; Legend SuperCup; European Touring Car Cup

Davit "Data" Kajaia (Georgian: დავით "დათა" ქაჯაია; born 10 January 1984 in Tbilisi) is a Georgian racing driver, best known for winning the Legends Euro Nations Cup in 2012 and 2013. He currently drives for the MIA Force team in the Georgian Circuit Championship.

== Career ==
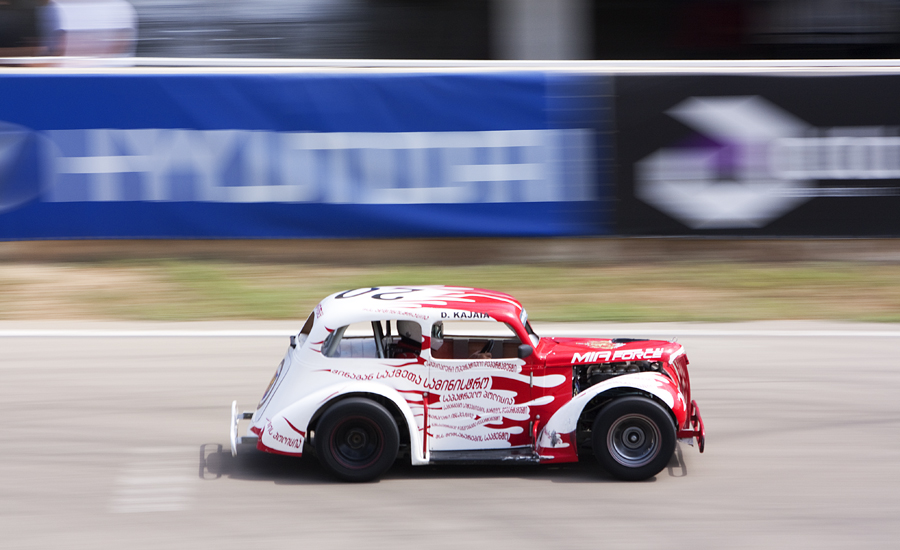
Kajaia competing in Legends racing at the Rustavi International Motorpark

Kajaia started his career in the Georgian Speed Slalom series in 2004. The next season, he achieved third place at the wheel of BMW M3, and won the national title a year later. In 2007, Kajaia entered the national circuit racing series and finished third in the championship, driving a Honda Civic 1600. On the same car, he came third overall in the national rally series. In 2010 and 2011, he dominated in Georgian pair racing championship.

After the reconstruction of the only Georgian race track Rustavi in 2011, Kajaia joined one of a newly established national teams, the MIA Force, sponsored by the national Ministry of Internal Affairs and won his first Legends race after a closely fought battle with more experienced rivals from Russia. In 2012, Kajaia continued driving in the Georgian Legends championship and also contested Europe Nations Cup of the same category. He finished second in the homeland series and won the Europe cup. In 2013, he took the national title, still dominating in Europe, and was awarded by the minister of internal affairs Irakli Garibashvili.

In 2014, Kajaia continued in domestic championship and also won European Legends SuperCup.

In 2015, Kajaia entered the European Touring Car Cup series (ETCC) with the TC2T class BMW 320 Engstler team. During the first race of the opening round on Hungaroring, Kajaia was on his way to a shock win against the dominant Seat Leon Cup class cars in his inferior BMW but a mistake on a last lap relegated him to second overall. Nevertheless, Kajaia won in his TC2T class convincingly in both races.

During the second round on Slovakiaring, Kajaia also won both races in TC2T class and came second overall in a second race, beating all but one Seat Leon Cup cars. Kajaia also scored the fastest lap of the race. Kajaia continued his successful campaign in France and Czech Republic on Paul Ricard and Brno circuits respectively by winning all races in TC2T and being in top-three across the line against dominant Seat Single Make Trophy cars in all races. He led the second race against Seats in Brno but could not hold on to his lead due to power disadvantage of his TC2T class car on uphill sections of the track and had to settle for third across the line (nevertheless he won in the TC2T class dully). Kajaia suggested after the race that he might have won outright had he not left his rain settings on after the early shower.

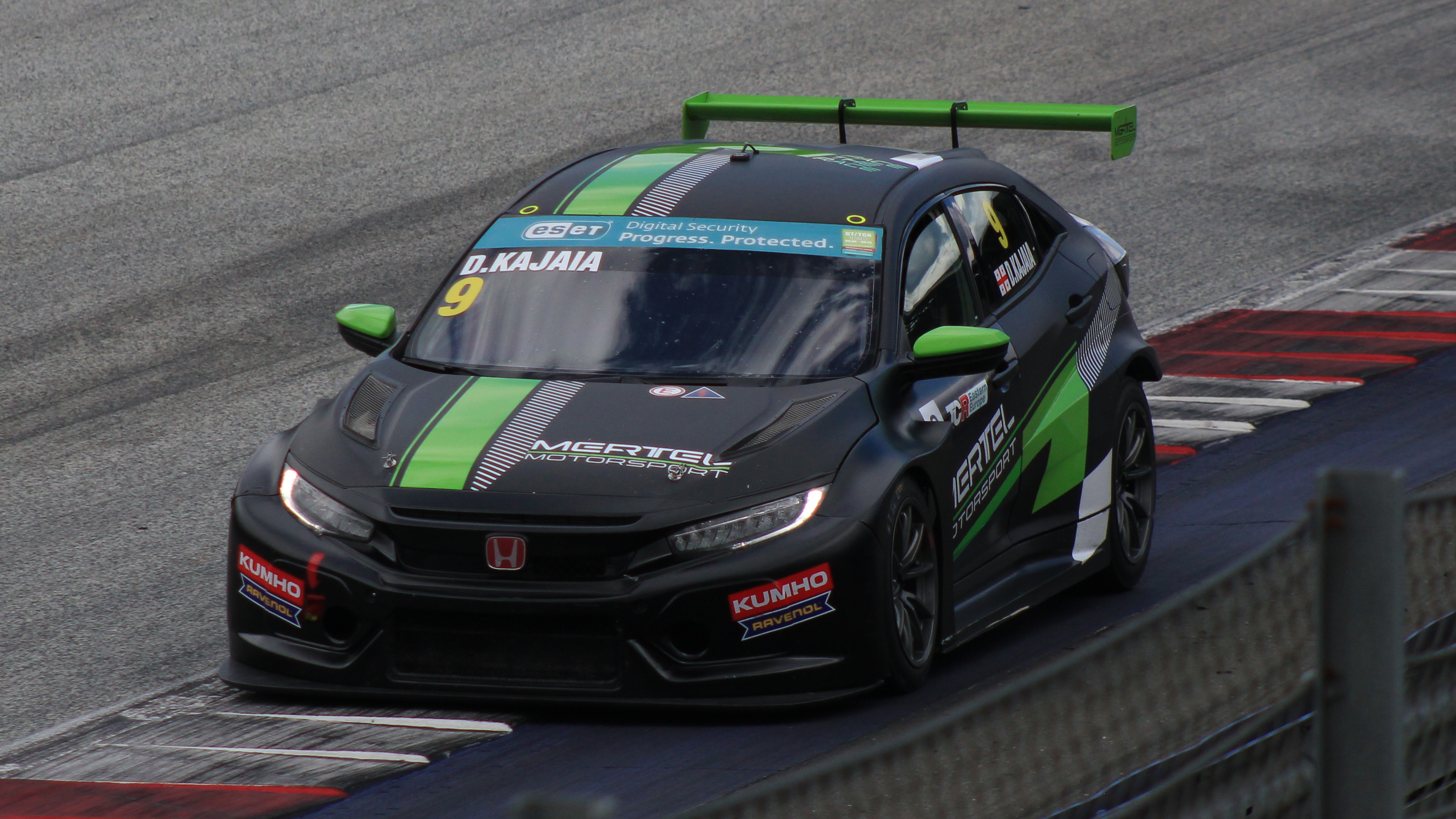
Kajaia at the Red Bull Ring in 2024

Kajaia's winning streak was interrupted on Zolder, in Belgium where he took pole position on the wet track and led the whole race 1 before a mechanical failure denied him the win three laps from the end. During the second race Kajaia went off the track and had to settle for second in TC2T.

For the last round in Pergusa, Italy, he also had to compete against Franz Engstler (owner of his team) in a sister BMW TC2T. During the first race he chased Petr Fulin in a Seat for the win but could not close in sufficiently to attack the Czech driver in a superior single make machinery. His win in TC2T was enough to secure him the 2015 title regardless of the results of the second race. During the second race both Engstler Motorsport cars made an excellent start from a reversed grid. After a couple of overtakes, Kajaia came second overall behind Engstler's leading TC2T BMW. Kajaia pushed his teammate hard, closing down on the German and putting pressure on him for the last several laps but could not find the way past and had to settle for second. Kajaia received his ETCC trophy during the FIA 2015 Motorsport awards held in December 2015.

== Racing record ==
=== Career highlights ===
Season	Series	Car	Position
2005	Speed Slalom Championship of Georgia	BMW M3	3rd
2006	Speed Slalom Championship of Georgia	BMW M3	1st
2006	Pair Racing Series	BMW M3	1st
2007	Speed Slalom Championship of Georgia	BMW M3	1st
2007	Pair Racing Series	BMW M3	2nd
2007	Circuit Racing Championship of Georgia	Honda Civic 1600	3rd
2007	Rally Championship of Georgia	Honda Civic 1600	3rd
2007	Georgian Race of Champions	Honda Civic 1600	2nd
2008	Pair Racing Rompetrol Cup	Honda Civic 1600	3rd
2008	Circuit Racing Championship of Georgia	Honda Civic 1600	3rd
2009	Pair Racing	BMW M3	1st
2009	Speed Slalom	BMW M3	3rd
2010	Pair Racing	BMW M3	1st
2010	Drift King 2010	BMW M3	2nd
2010	Rustavi Pair Racing Super Finals	BMW M3	1st
2011	Pair Racing	BMW M3	1st
2011	Speed Slalom	BMW M3	3rd
2011	Pair Racing Rompetrol Cup	BMW M3	2nd
2011	Pair Racing Gulf Cup	BMW M3	2nd
2011	Rustavi Motorpark Pre-Opening Race	Legends	1st
2012	Hill Climb	BMW M3	3rd
2012	Pair Racing	BMW M3	1st
2012	Bridgestone Black Sea Cup	BMW M3	2nd
2012	Circuit Racing Championship of Georgia	Legends	2nd
2012	Euro Nations Cup	Legends	1st
2013	Circuit Racing Championship of Georgia	Legends	1st
2013	Euro Nations Cup	Legends	1st
2014	Circuit Racing Championship of Georgia	Legends	2nd
2014	European SuperCup	Legends	1st
2015	European Touring Car Cup	BMW 320 TC	1st

=== Racing career summary ===
Season	Series	Team	Races	Wins	Poles	F/Laps	Podiums	Points	Position
2012	Legends Cars Georgia	MIA Force	3	0	?	0	1	22	11th
2013	Legends Cars Georgia	MIA Force	12	7	0	2	10	?	**1st**
2014	Legend SuperCup	Team Georgia	23	11	4	9	20	950	**1st**
2014	MW-V6 Pickup Series	Team Georgia	3	1	0	0	3	50	8th
2015	European Touring Car Cup - TC2T	Liqui Moly Team Engstler	12	5	9	11	12	149	**1st**
2016	TCR International Series	Liqui Moly Team Engstler	22	0	0	0	1	80	10th
2017	TCR International Series	GE-Force	20	1	1	2	1	77	11th
2017	TCR Middle East Series	Mulsanne Racing	3	0	0	1	2	56	4th
2019	TCR Europe Touring Car Series	PCR Sport With Georgia	10	0	0	0	0	52	23rd
2021	BMW M2 Cup Germany	Project 1	?	?	?	?	?	126	4th
2023	TCR Eastern Europe Trophy	Mertel Motorsport	12	1	0	0	5	129	4th
2024	TCR Eastern Europe Trophy	Mertel Motorsport	11	0	0	0	0	64	9th
2024	GT Cup Open Europe	Mertel Motorsport							
2024	TCR Europe Touring Car Series	Mertel Motorsport	2	0	0	0	0	0	NC†
2024	Ferrari Challenge Europe - Trofeo Pirelli (Pro-Am)	Mertel Motorsport	2	0	0	0	0	5	21st
2025	NASCAR Euro Series - PRO	Marko Stipp Motorsport	2	0	0	0	0	366	13th
2025	NASCAR Euro Series - PRO	Team Georgia by RDV	10	0	0	0	0	366	13th
2026	NASCAR Euro Series - V8GP	Kolkhi Georgia Racing Team	12	0	0	0	0	363	15th
2026	GT2 European Series - Masters	RTR Projects							

^{†} As Kajaia was a guest driver, he was ineligible for points.

=== Complete European Touring Car Cup results ===
(key) (Races in bold indicate pole position) (Races in italics indicate the fastest lap)

Year	Team	Car	Class	1	2	3	4	5	6	7	8	9	10	11	12	DC	Points
2015	Liqui Moly Team Engstler	BMW 320 TC	TC2 T	**HUN**; **1**; 2	**HUN**; **1**; 4	**SVK**; **1**; 5	**SVK**; **2**; 2	**LEC**; **1**; 3	**LEC**; **2**; 6	**BRN**; **1**; 3	**BRN**; **2**; 3	**ZOL**; **1**; 10	ZOL; 2; 9	PER; 1; 2	PER; 2; 2	1st	149

=== Complete TCR International Series results ===
(key) (Races in bold indicate pole position) (Races in italics indicate fastest lap)

Year	Team	Car	1	2	3	4	5	6	7	8	9	10	11	12	13	14	15	16	17	18	19	20	21	22	DC	Points
2016	Liqui Moly Team Engstler	Volkswagen Golf GTI TCR	BHR; 1; 6	BHR; 2; 4	EST; 1; 13	EST; 2; 7	SPA; 1; 7	SPA; 2; 14	IMO; 1; 3	IMO; 2; 8	SAL; 1; 7	SAL; 2 Ret	OSC; 1; 8	OSC; 2 Ret	SOC; 1; 7	SOC; 2; 11	CHA; 1; 10	CHA; 2; 5	MRN; 1; 17†	MRN; 2; 8	SEP; 1 Ret	SEP; 2; 10	MAC; 1; 15	MAC; 2; 15	10th	80
2017	GE-Force	Alfa Romeo Giulietta TCR	**RIM**; **1**; 1	RIM; 2; 6	BHR; 1 Ret	BHR; 2; 15†	SPA; 1; 18	SPA; 2; 7	MNZ; 1; 16†	MNZ; 2; 7	SAL; 1; 7	SAL; 2; 11	HUN; 1; 11	HUN; 2 Ret	OSC; 1; 16	OSC; 2; 9	CHA; 1; 8	CHA; 2; 23†	ZHE; 1; 8	ZHE; 2 Ret	DUB; 1; 10	DUB; 2; 10			12th	76

^{†} Driver did not finish the race, but was classified as he completed over 75% of the race distance.

=== Complete TCR Europe Touring Car Series results ===
(key) (Races in bold indicate pole position) (Races in italics indicate fastest lap)

Year	Team	Car	1	2	3	4	5	6	7	8	9	10	11	12	13	14	DC	Points
2019	PCR Sport With Georgia	CUPRA León TCR	HUN; 1; 17	HUN; 2; 10	HOC; 1; 17	HOC; 2; 24	SPA; 1; 6	SPA; 2 Ret	RBR; 1; 7	RBR; 2 Ret	OSC; 1 Ret	OSC; 2; 22†	CAT; 1	CAT; 2	MNZ; 1	MNZ; 2	23rd	52
2024	GOAT Racing	Honda Civic Type R TCR (FL5)	VAL; 1	VAL; 2	ZOL; 1	ZOL; 2	SAL; 1	SAL; 2	SPA; 1	SPA; 2	BRN; 1; 11	BRN; 2; 12	CRT; 1	CRT; 2			NC‡	0‡

^{†} Driver did not finish the race, but was classified as he completed over 90% of the race distance. ^{‡} As Kajaia was a guest driver, he was ineligible for points.

=== Complete NASCAR results ===
==== Euro Series – EuroNASCAR PRO ====
(key) (Bold – Pole position. Italics – Fastest lap. * – Most laps led. ^ – Most positions gained)

NASCAR Euro Series – EuroNASCAR PRO results
Year	Team	No.	Make	1	2	3	4	5	6	7	8	9	10	11	12	NWES	Pts
2025	Marko Stipp Motorsport	48	Chevy	ESP; 13	ESP; 14											13th	366
2025	Team Georgia by RDV	9	Chevy			ITA; 21	ITA; 16	GBR; 12	GBR; 14	CZE; 20	CZE; 18	GER; 10	GER; 22	BEL; 7	BEL; 7	13th	366
