= Danny van Dongen =

Dutch racing driver

- Nationality: (Netherlands) Dutch
- Born: 19 March 1983 (age 43) Zandvoort, Netherlands

MW-V6 Pickup Series career
- Debut season: 2014

Previous series
- 2013 2012 2011 2009-10 2008 2006-07 2004 2002 2001 1999-00: Dutch Supercar Challenge - Superlights PR1; Dutch Supercar Challenge - Super GT; Raceway Venray BRL V6; ADAC GT Masters; Dutch Supercar Challenge - GT; Dutch GT4 Championship; Dutch Supercar Challenge - Supersport 1 GT4 European Cup; Spanish GT - GTA; Dutch Supercar Challenge - GT1; Dutch Renault Clio Cup; Dutch Citroën Saxo Cup

Championship titles
- 2013 2014: Dutch Supercar Challenge - Superlights PR1; MW-V6 Pickup Series

Danny van Dongen (born 1983) is a Dutch racing driver and entrepreneur currently competing in the MW-V6 Pickup Series.

== Racing career ==
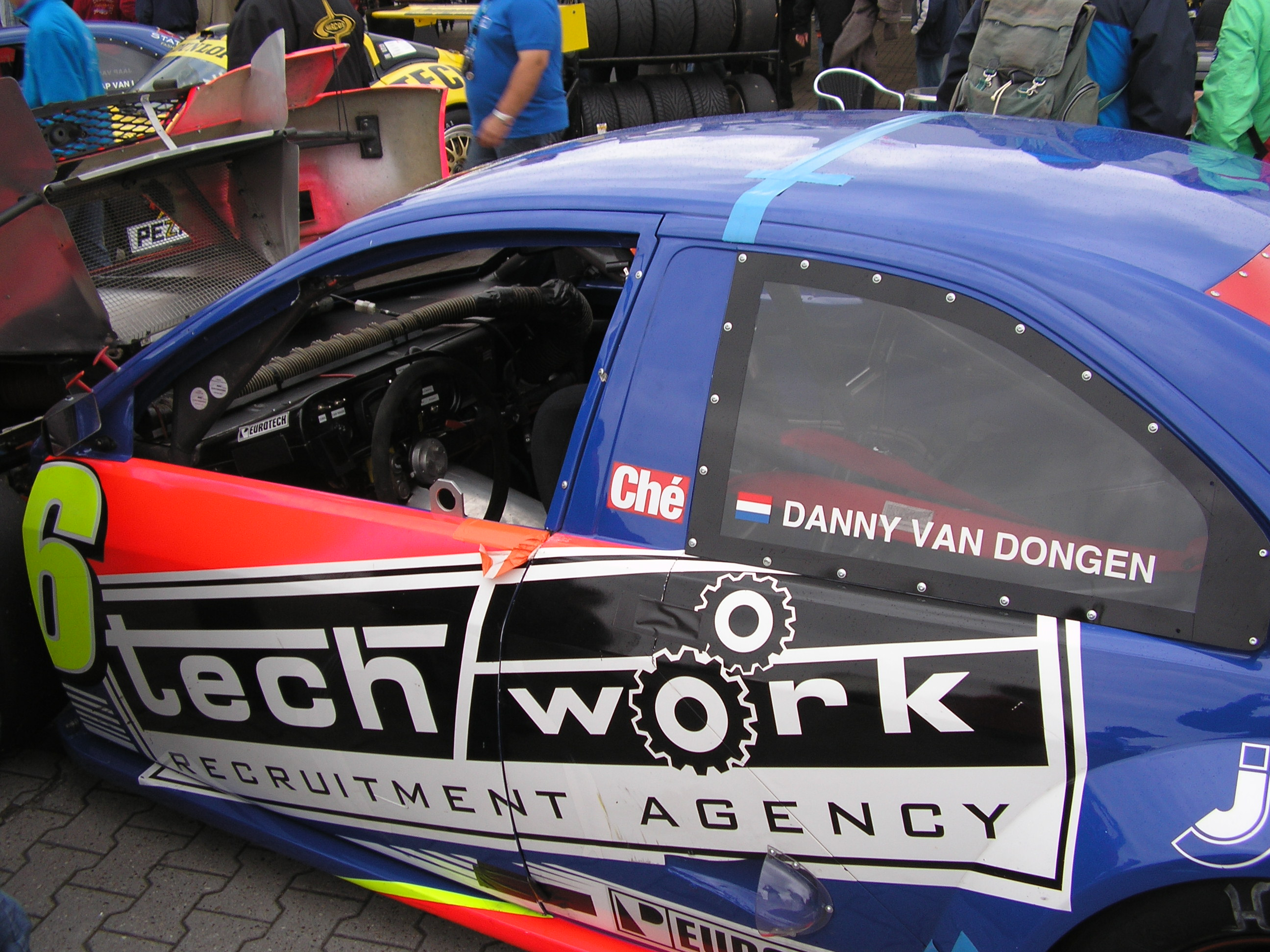
Danny van Dongens BRL V6 car in 2007

Van Dongen started his racing career in the Dutch Citroën Saxo Cup. He scored a third-place finish in the championship in 2000. The following year, he graduated to the Renault Clio Cup finishing seventh. He also raced in the Dutch Formula Arcobaleno and the German Formula König. In 2002, he graduated into GT racing, racing a Marcos Mantis for semi-works team Eurotech. Van Dongen competed in the Dutch Supercar Challenge and the Euro GT Series. He also raced in the Spanish GT Championship for the Marcos works team in a Marcos LM600.

In 2006, van Dongen returned to his native country racing in the BRL V6 silhouette racing series. He achieved several podium finishes in 2006 and 2007. Van Dongen founded the Dutch Race Driver Academy a racing school for aspiring racing drivers. He also continued racing a Chevrolet Corvette C6 in the Dutch Supercar Challenge. The following year, he raced the same car in the Dutch GT4 Championship. In 2009 and 2010, he scored a total of three wins in the championship driving a Corvette. The following year, van Dongen founded the Dutch Racing Driver Organisation. The organisation sanctions auto races in three different classes: BMW M3, Diesel and Specials. In 2011, he graduated from the Johan Cruijff Academy. In the same year, he also ran full-time in the ADAC GT Masters and Dutch Supercar Challenge. Van Dongen won two races, racing an Audi R8 LMS, in the Dutch Supercar Challenge GT class. In 2012, van Dongen was contracted by Praga as a factory driver for the new Praga R1. He raced a limited schedule in the R1 predecessor the Praga R4S. At one of the few ovals in the Netherlands, Raceway Venray, he raced in the BRL V6 series scoring two wins and a second place in the championship. In 2013, he won the Dutch Supercar Challenge Superlights championship in the Praga R1 class. In 2014, van Dongen returned to international racing in the Acceleration 2014 MW-V6 Pickup Series.
