= Jacky van der Ende =

Dutch racing driver

- Nationality: (Netherlands) Dutch
- Born: 20 November 1976 (age 49) Maasdijk (Netherlands)
- Relatives: Ricardo van der Ende (brother)

Championship titles
- 1997 1997 2011 2012 2023: British Formula Ford; Formula Ford Festival; BRL V6; Supercar Challenge (GTB)

Jacky van der Ende (born 20 November 1976 in South Holland, Maasdijk) is a Dutch racing driver. He won both the British Formula Ford Championship and the Formula Ford Festival in 1997. Van der Ende is a two-time Champion of the BRL V6 series winning it in 2011 and 2012. He last competed in the Supercar Challenge in a Cupra Leon TCR. He and Nelson van der Pol won the title in GTB-Division in 2023. As of April 20, 2024, Van der Ende has not competed in any race since the 2023 Supercar Madness at TT Assen.
