= European Stock 600 Series =

- Category: Superstock racing
- Country: Europe
- Inaugural season: 2014
- Folded: 2014
- Tyre suppliers: Michelin
- Official website: http://www.accelerationevents.com/

The European Stock 600 Series was a junior motorcycle racing series held across several European countries over the course of a season that runs from mid-Spring to mid-Autumn. The series runs under technical regulations very similar to the European Superstock 600 Championship that runs on the support program of the Superbike World Championship. The series runs as part of the Dutch-based Acceleration 2014 series and is limited to 15-year-old riders.
