= BRL Light =

Dutch car racing competition

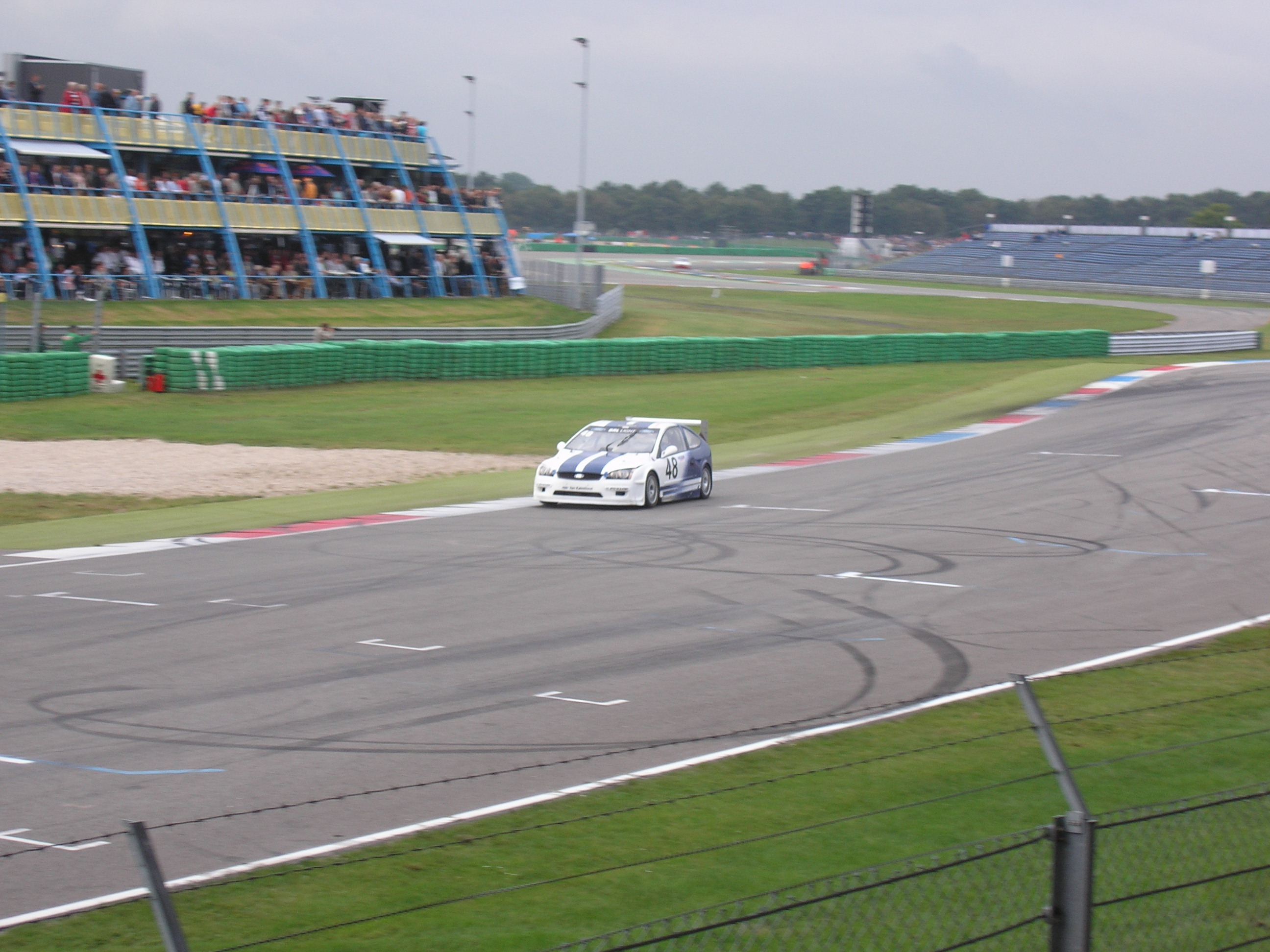

The Benelux Racing League Light was a touring car racing series held in Belgium and the Netherlands from 2005 to 2009. It served as the development series of the BRL V6.

== The car ==
All the cars in the series are identical, with a tubular chassis and a silhouette body of a Ford Focus. The engine was a 240hp, 2.3L Ford Duratec. The cars have rearwheel drive. The weight of the car wass 825kg. The series used Dunlop slick tyres.

== Champions ==
| Season | Driver |
|---|---|
| 2005 | Francesco Pastorelli |
| 2006 | Marijn van Kalmthout |
| 2007 | Henry Zumbrink |
| 2008 | Marijn van Kalmthout |
| 2009 | Chris Maliepaard |
