= European Stock 1000 Series =

- Category: Superstock racing
- Country: Europe
- Inaugural season: 2014
- Folded: 2014
- Tyre suppliers: Michelin
- Official website: http://www.accelerationevents.com/

The European Stock 1000 Series was a junior motorcycle racing series held across several European countries over the course of a season that runs from mid-Spring to mid-Autumn. The series runs under technical regulations very similar to the FIM Stock 1000cc Cup that runs on the support program of the Superbike World Championship. The series runs as part of the Dutch-based Acceleration 2014 series and is limited to 16-year-old riders.
