= BRL V6 =

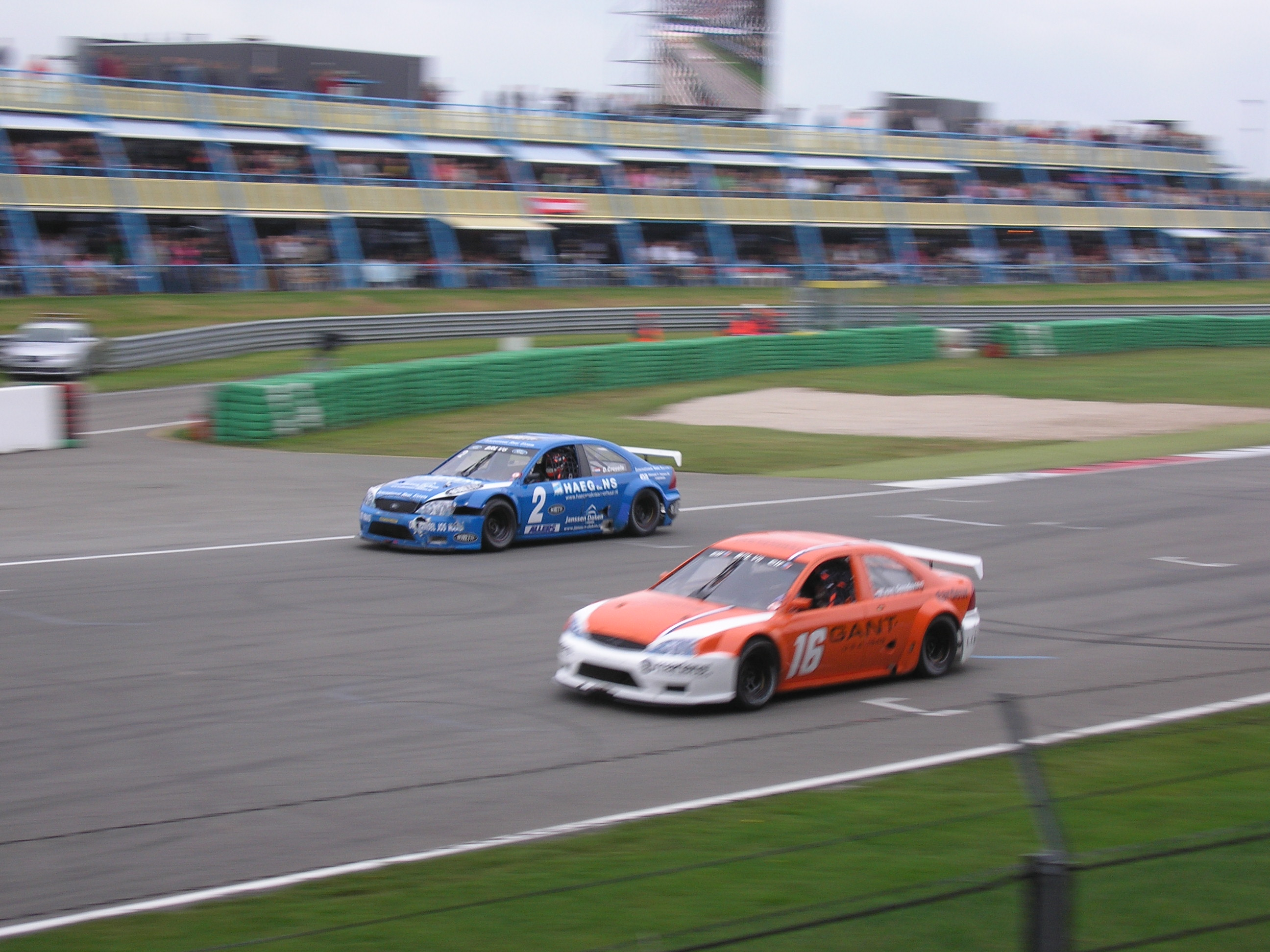
- The BRL V6 at the TT Circuit Assen
- Category: Touring cars
- Country: Netherlands; Belgium; Germany
- Inaugural season: 2004
- Folded: 2009

The Benelux Racing League V6, better known as BRL V6, was a touring car racing series held in the Netherlands and Belgium between 2004 and 2009. For 2010, BRL cars were allowed into the Dutch Supercar Challenge.

== History ==
=== Original series ===
The BRL V6 was first launched, as the V6 Oval Series, in July 2003. Entrepreneur Harry Maessen founded the racing series and a test was conducted at his own racetrack, Circuit de Peel. The car made its competition debut in the Dutch Winter Endurance Series New Years race at Circuit Park Zandvoort 2004. Drivers Jeroen Reijntjes and Sandor van Es placed the car on pole position, but technical difficulties prevented a strong finish.

The inaugural season, 2004, featured four race weekends. The series competed at Spa-Francorchamps, Zolder, Zandvoort and Oschersleben. The initial calendar also featured oval races at Raceway Venray and a new to construct oval in the German Ruhr. These did not take place. Cor Euser, racing a Jeff Gordon resembling paint scheme, won the first pole position. Donny Crevels and Duncan Huisman won the first two races at Spa. Facing heavy competition from Euser and Thomas Mutsch, Crevels went on to win the inaugural season.

The level of competition went up the following year with Kurt Thiim and Jeroen Bleekemolen joining the series and Xavier Maessen and Marc Goossens making guest appearances. The BRL V6 field was joined by the BRL Light development series. It was the successor of the previous VEGE Series (2000-2004) and featured a less powerful 2.3L Ford Duratec engine. For the inaugural BRL Light season the series kept their VEGE Series Ford Sierra bodywork before switching to a Ford Fiesta bodywork in 2006. Bleekemolen joined the US Carworld team as its sole full-time driver. The 2004 Deutsche Tourenwagen Masters driver won eleven out of fifteen races, dominating the championship.

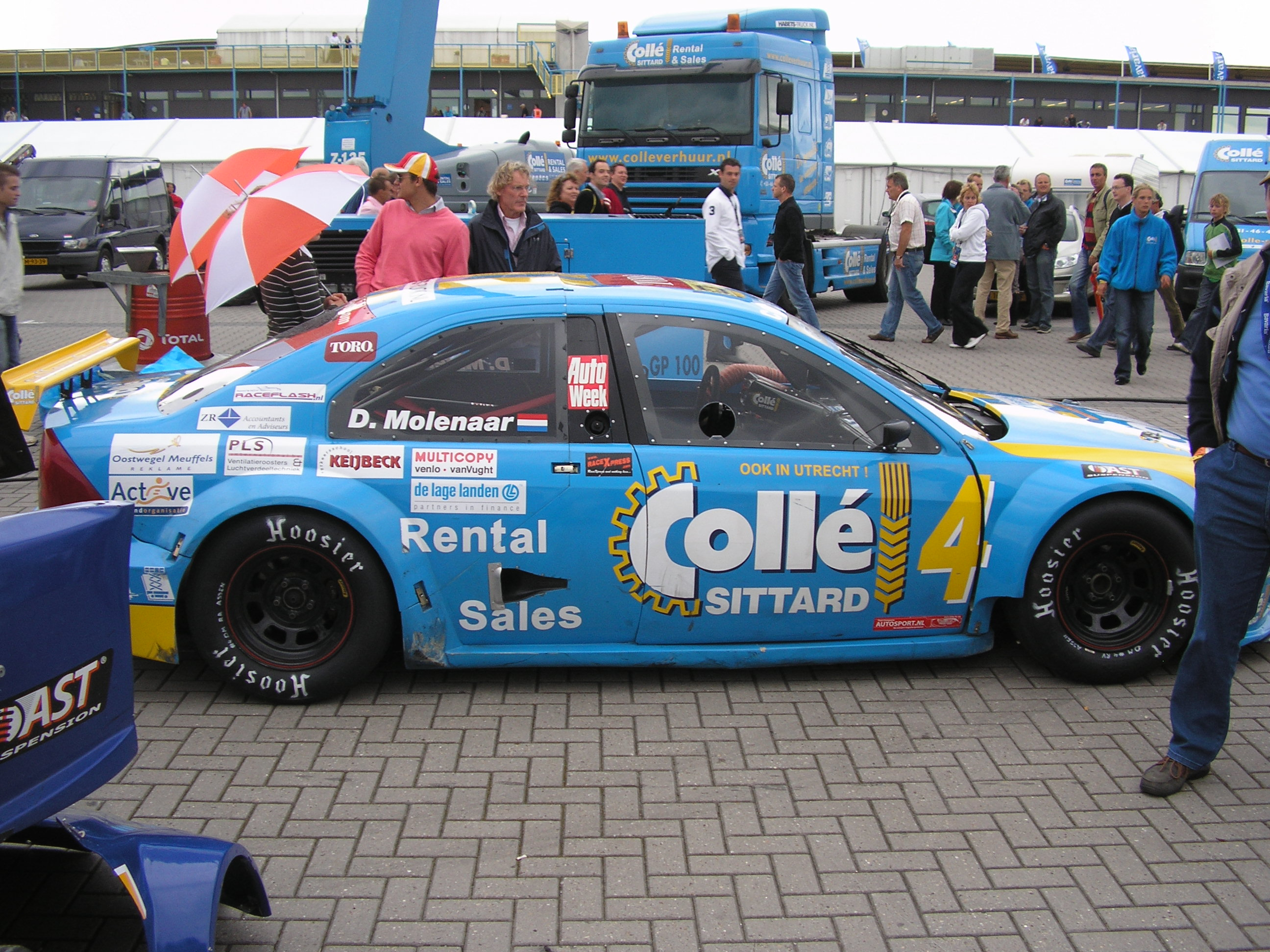
2007, 2008 and 2009 champion Donald Molenaar

For 2006 a number of technical improvements were made to the car. The car received a softer compound of Hoosier slicks. Also cooling to the brakes was improved. The Collé Racing domination started in 2006, lasting until the final season of the original season in 2009. Collé Racing driver Sandor van Es won the championship in 2006 before teammate Donald Molenaar won the series in 2007, 2008 and 2009. Early in the 2006 season Collé Racing faced stiff competition from Eurotech Racing drivers Marc Goossens and Danny van Dongen whom competed for podium finishes. The series also competed during the 2006 A1GP weekend at Zandvoort. Prominent guest drivers joined the series, such as Junior Strous and Jan Lammers. Lammers scored a seventh place in the first race with Crevels winning both races.

The BRL joined the Belgian and Dutch rounds of the 2007 Champ Car season at Zolder and Assen. Collé Racing continued reigning supreme in 2007 with Molenaar winning six races and Sandor van Es winning four races in the fourteen race season. The other four races were won by Bleekemolen (who ran a partial schedule) and Donny Crevels, two each. The final races of the season, at Zandvoort, were marred by an incident involving 2005-2006 BRL Light champion Marijn van Kalmthout. During qualifying Van Kalmthout went off track in a yellow flag zone almost hitting a rescue vehicle and marshal. Van Kalmthout was disqualified for the remainder of the weekend. The disqualification had no effect on the championship standings were Van Kalmthout remained third.

For 2008 the schedule was reduced to twelve races, with Molenaar again winning eight and the championship. In 2009 Donny Crevels beat Collé Racing driver Sandor van Es for the second place in the championship. At first it was announced the series would race at Racepark Meppen, also owned by series founder Harry Maessen, but the track was not built in time for the race weekend.

=== Dutch Supercar Challenge ===
During the 2009 season it was announced that the BRL V6 series would cease to exist an independent racing series. The series joined the Dutch Supercar Challenge roster. The series formed a separate class in the Supersport I and GT field. As the races in the Dutch Supercar Challenge had a semi-endurance set-up the BRL V6 cars were modified. The cars were fitted with more durable brakes and a larger fuel tank. The Hoosier tyres were replaced by Dunlop tyres. Many teams did not remain in the new series and driver numbers dropped. Compared to previous season the championship battle was very tight. Niels Bouwhuis claimed the championship in the final round, beating Nelson van der Pol by seven points.

The following season the BRL V6 was no longer a separate class, but joined the Supersport I class. In the Supersport I class other cars competed such as the Porsche 997 and the Aston Martin Vantage.

=== Raceway Venray ===
For 2011 Harry Maessen transformed the BRL V6 series into an oval racing series at his own Raceway Venray. Raceway Venray includes a half mile oval configuration the series used. The series returned to their soft Hoosier tyres. The series invited many stock car regulars. Donald Molenaar, and Collé Racing, returned to the series. As Jacky van der Ende won eight races, and Molenaar seven, Van der Ende won the championship. Van der Ende repeated the feat in 2012. Renger van der Zande won the final championship series in 2013.

=== MW-V6 Pickup Series ===
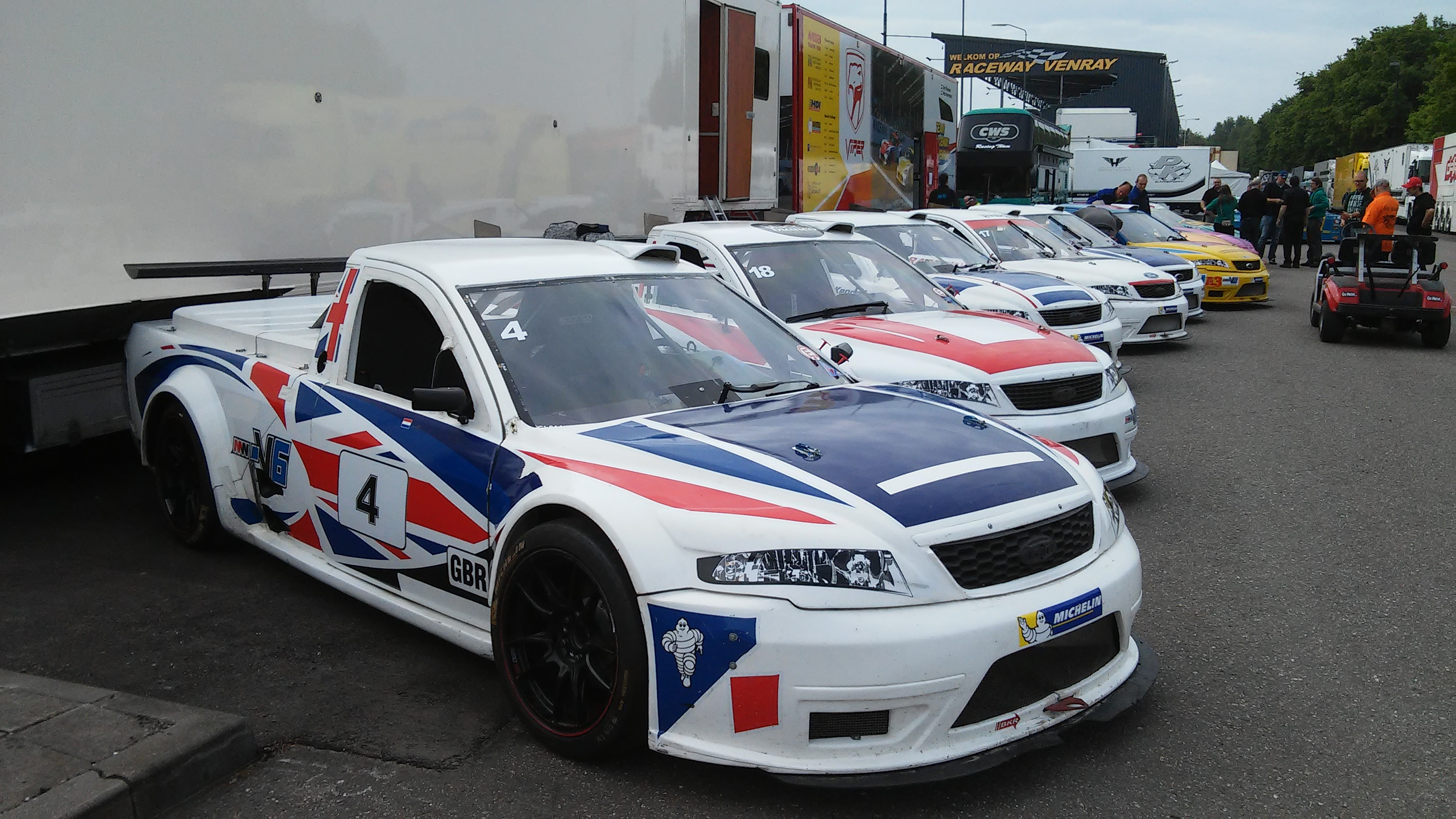
MWV6 Pick Up's on display at Raceway Venray

In 2014 Maessen sold the cars to the Acceleration 2014 organisation. The cars were transformed into pick-up trucks with a rear-wing to provide more downforce. Due to small grids the series folded after one season. Danny van Dongen, the only full-time driver in the series, was crowned champion. The cars were bought again by Harry Maessen and ran a demonstration event at Raceway Venray during the 2015 NASCAR Whelen Euro Series event. A calendar for the pick-up series at Assen and Meppen was announced. However, no races were run.

== The car ==
All the cars in this series were identical, with a tubular chassis developed by Weytech Technical Assistance, and a silhouette body of a Ford Mondeo. The motor was a Ford 4.0 L V6 with 325 hp and a torque of 440 N·m. The car had a weight of 925 kg. The series used Hoosier slicks and Wilwood disk brakes.

== Formula BRL spin-off ==
In 2006, BRL V6 founder founder Harry Maessen purchased twelve Reynard 2KF chassis from the former Formula Chrysler Euroseries. Maessen fitted the cars with Ford engines. In early 2008, the 2001 Formula Chrysler Euroseries, champion, Ricardo van der Ende tested the renewed car at Zolder. The class ran demonstration races at the Rizla Racing Days at the TT Circuit Assen. The field was made up of young talent, such as Thomas Hylkema and Henk Vuik, Jr., and experienced BRL racing names such as Barry Maessen and Henry Zumbrink. Vuik, Jr. won the first race, before Hylkema and Maessen. The second races was a rain spectacle with many drivers, in their first weekend racing the car, struggling in difficult circumstances. The 2003 Dutch Formula Ford Zetec champion Nelson van der Pol won the second race.

Plans to race a full season in 2009, joining other national series, never came to fruition.

== Champions ==
| Season | Driver | Team | Tyre | Points |
BRL V6
| 2004 | (Netherlands) Donny Crevels | Weytech | H | 86 |
| 2005 | (Netherlands) Jeroen Bleekemolen | US Carworld Racing | H | 262 |
| 2006 | (Netherlands) Sandor van Es | Collé Racing | H | 203 |
| 2007 | (Netherlands) Donald Molenaar | Collé Racing | H | 206 |
| 2008 | (Netherlands) Donald Molenaar | Collé Racing | H | 230 |
| 2009 | (Netherlands) Donald Molenaar | Collé Racing | H | 210 |
Dutch Supercar Challenge - BRL V6
| 2010 | (Netherlands) Niels Bouwhuis | BRL Association | D | 210 |
Raceway Venray BRL V6
| 2011 | (Netherlands) Jacky van der Ende | Van Berlo Racing | H | 351 |
| 2012 | (Netherlands) Jacky van der Ende | Van Berlo Racing | H | 254 |
| 2013 | (Netherlands) Renger van der Zande | Teunissen Racing | H | 298 |
MW-V6 Pickup Series
| 2014 | (Netherlands) Danny van Dongen | | M | 282 |

== Point system ==
| Place | Points | Place | Points | Place | Points |
|---|---|---|---|---|---|
| 1. | 20 | 6. | 10 | 11. | 5 |
| 2. | 17 | 7. | 9 | 12. | 4 |
| 3. | 15 | 8. | 8 | 13. | 3 |
| 4. | 13 | 9. | 7 | 14. | 2 |
| 5. | 11 | 10. | 6 | 15+ | 1 |

- Pole position is worth 1 point
- Fastest lap is worth 1 point
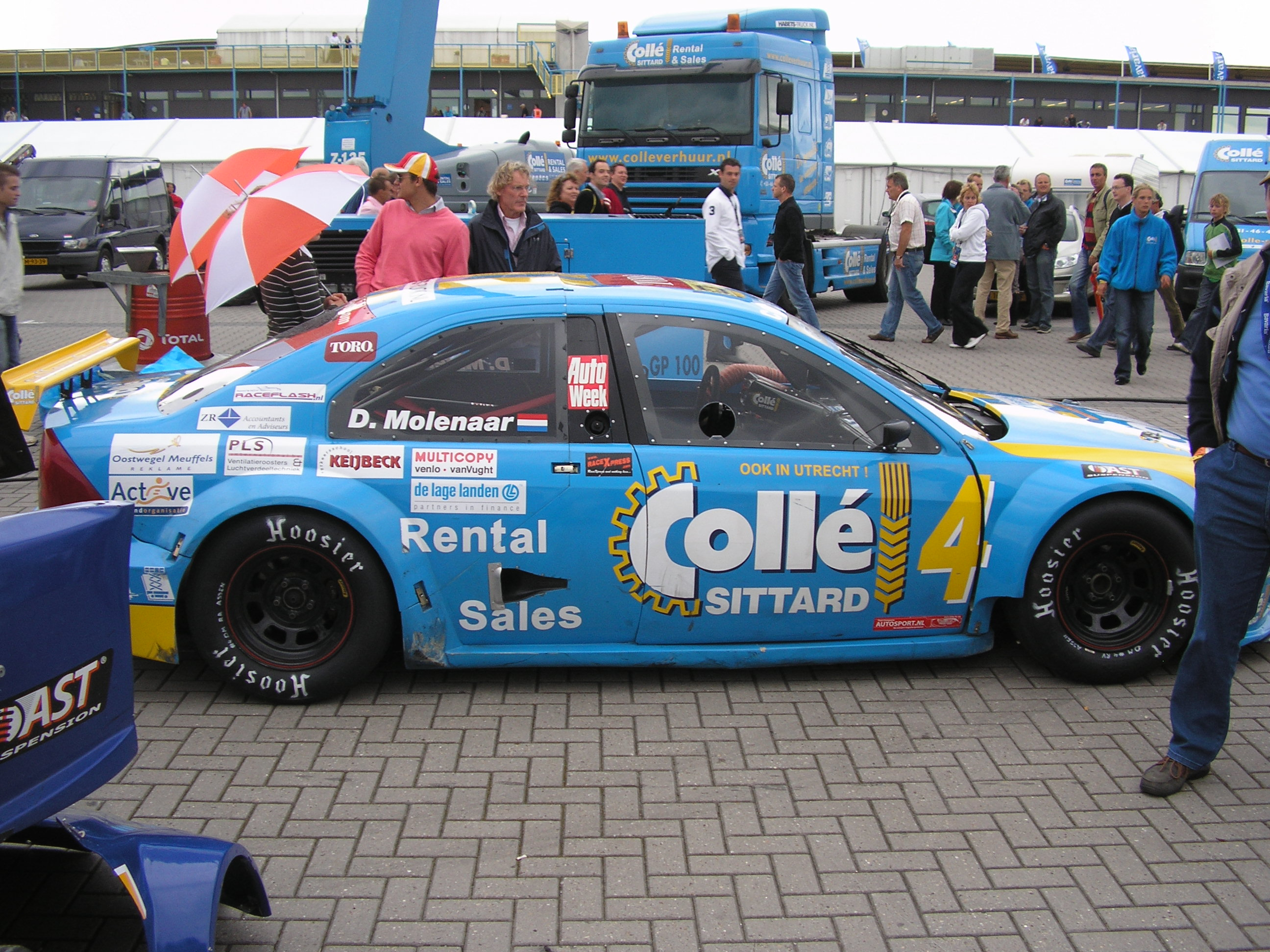
Donald Molenaars car.

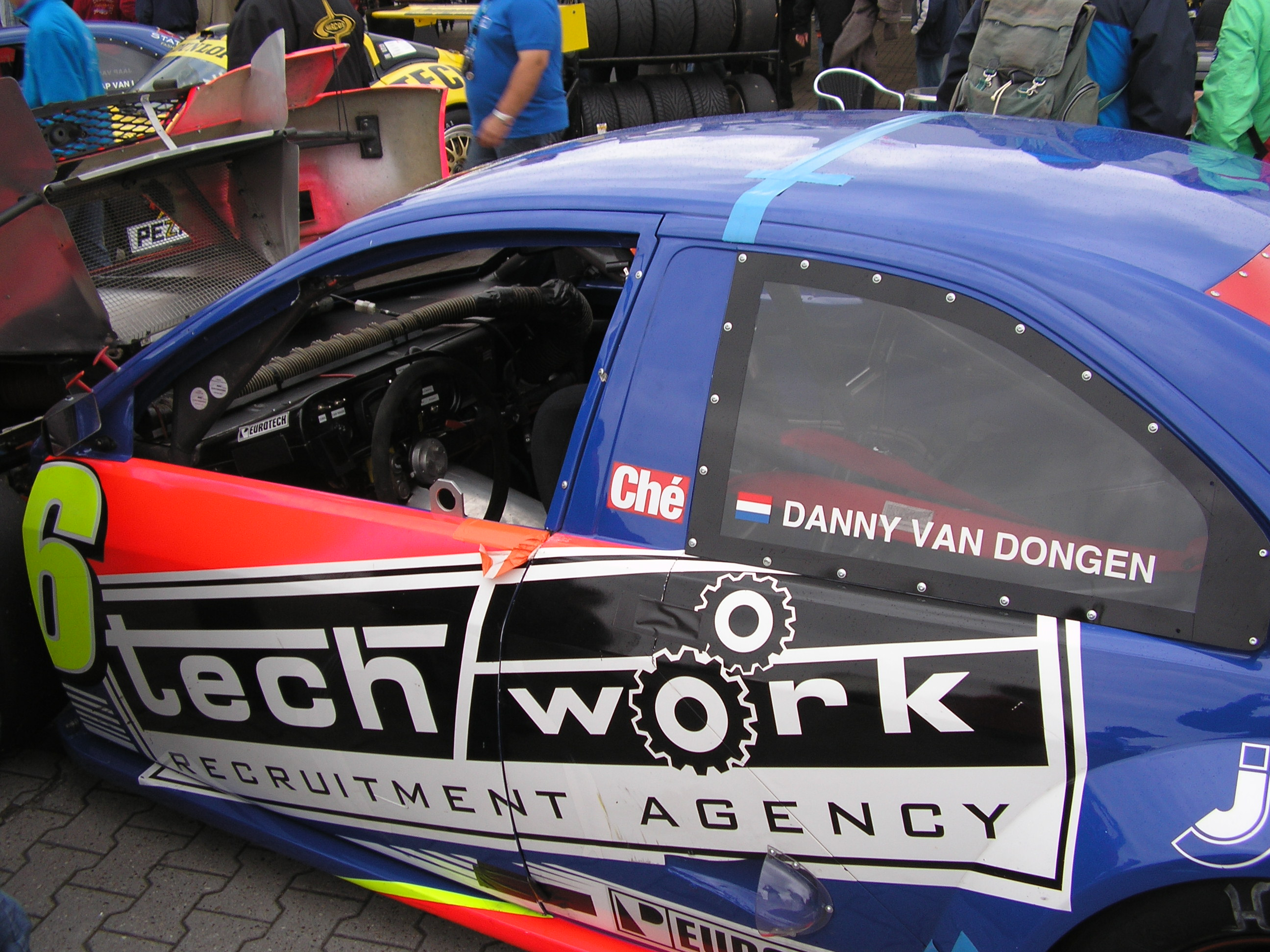
Danny van Dongens car.

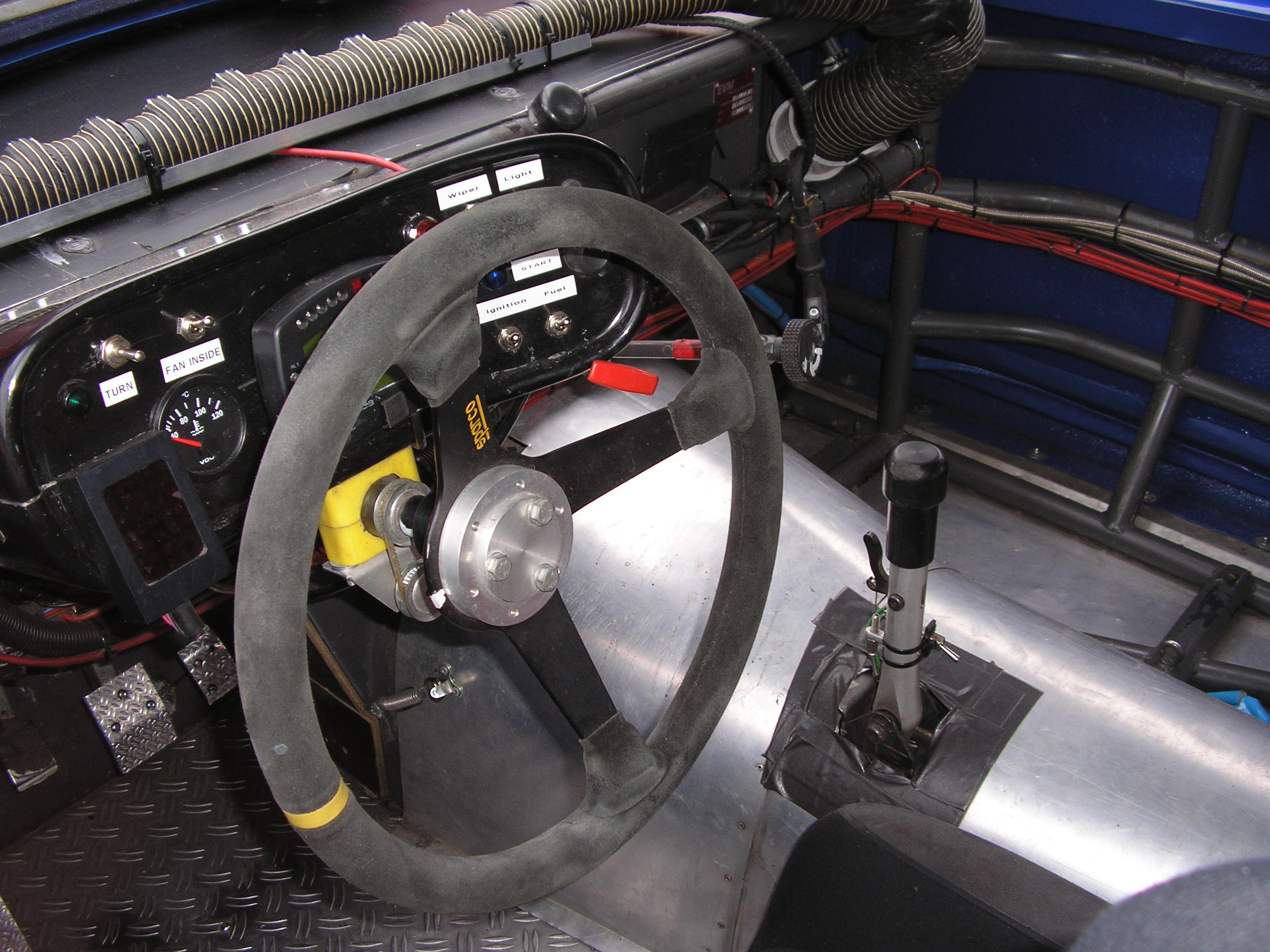
The inside of a BRL V6 car.
