= Formula Acceleration 1 =

Former Single-Seater Racing Championship

- Category: Single seaters
- Country: Europe
- Inaugural season: 2014
- Folded: 2014
- Drivers: 19
- Teams: 11
- Constructors: Lola
- Engine suppliers: Zytek
- Tyre suppliers: Michelin
- Last Drivers' champion: (Netherlands) Nigel Melker
- Last Teams' champion: Netherlands
- Official website: Official website

Formula Acceleration 1 (FA1) was a single make, open wheel auto racing series. It was unusual in its field in that competitors solely represented their nation as opposed to themselves or a team, the usual format in most formula racing series.

FA1 was created in 2014 as the signature category in the Acceleration 2014 series of motorsport festivals. Rather than developing their own car, the series reduced costs substantially by using the Lola B05/52 which was used in the early years of the A1 Grand Prix series. They also continued to use the same 3.4 litre V8 engine built by Zytek Engineering. On 22 December 2014, it was announced that the series would be merged with Auto GP in 2015. This to ensure that at least 18 cars will participate in each race. It was also announced that the 2015 champion will be granted a Formula 1 test. However, the season was halted after two rounds due to the lack of entrants.

== Technical specifications ==
All cars are mechanically identical and were built with reducing costs in mind, which has led to an approximate price for the whole season of €450,000. FA1 intended to use the Lola B05/52, used in the A1 Grand Prix between 2005 and 2008.

- Engine: 3.4 litre Zytek ZA1348 V8
- Horsepower: 550 hp
- Chassis: carbon fibre and aluminium honeycomb
- Wheelbase: 3,000 mm (118.1 in)
- Weight: 698 kg (driver included)
- Suspension: double wishbone suspension with push-rod
- Dampers: Öhlins TT44 3-Way, adjustable
- Gearbox: Xtrac, electronic, six gears
- Brakes: AP calipers with four pistons, steel discs
- Tyres: Michelin

== Champion ==
Season	Champion	Team Champion
2014	(Netherlands) Nigel Melker	Netherlands
