= Acceleration 2014 =

Multi-day festival

Acceleration 2014 was a multi-day festival combining top class car and bike racing with live music and other entertainment. The festival was organised by the International Sport Racing Association (ISRA), based in the Netherlands, and was held six times in 2014, starting 25–27 April in Portimao, Portugal and ending 17–19 October in Assen, Netherlands. The various racing competitions were Formula Acceleration 1 (FA1), the MW-V6 Pickup Series, the Legend SuperCup (LSC), the European Stock 1000 Series (ACC 1000) and the European Stock 600 Series (ACC 600). Competing drivers in one or more classes each drove a vehicle representing their country of origin.

== Calendar ==
Date	Event	Circuit	City	Notes
29–30 Nov 2013	Testing	Circuito de Navarra	Navarra, Spain	
26–27 Mar 2014	Testing	Circuit Ricardo Tormo	Valencia, Spain	
10 Apr 2014	Testing	Circuit Park Zandvoort	Zandvoort, Netherlands	Only MW-V6
22–23 Apr 2014	Testing	Autódromo Internacional do Algarve	Portimao, Portugal	
25–27 Apr 2014	Acceleration at Portimao	Autódromo Internacional do Algarve	Portimao, Portugal	No ACC 1000 and no ACC 600
2–4 May 2014	Acceleration at Navarra	Circuito de Navarra	Navarra, Spain	
23–25 May 2014	Acceleration at Nürburgring	Nürburgring	Nürburg, Germany	No ACC 1000 and no ACC 600
6–8 Jun 2014	Acceleration in Monza	Autodromo Nazionale Monza	Monza, Italy	No ACC 1000 and no ACC 600
4–6 Jul 2014	Acceleration at Slovakia Ring	Automotodróm Slovakia Ring	Orechová Potôň, Slovakia	No FA1
17–19 Oct 2014	Acceleration in Assen	TT Circuit Assen	Assen, Netherlands	No ACC 1000 and no ACC 600

The 2014 calendar consisted of six race weekends. Originally, ten were planned. However, Acceleration in Zolder, Acceleration at Paul Ricard, and Acceleration at Grobnik were cancelled on 27 June 2014 and Acceleration at Hungaroring was cancelled on 21 August 2014.

== Racing competitions ==
=== Formula Acceleration 1 ===
Each FA1 team represented a nation. Their drivers may have been a different nationality, but the car represented the country. The winning driver/team was entitled to the full budget for the 2015 FA1 season and a test day in the GP2 Series car in Abu Dhabi.

==== Race format ====
Day	Duration	Event
Friday	30 min	Free practice 1
Friday	30 min	Free practice 2
Friday	30 min	Qualifying for race 1 (1 point for pole position)
Saturday	30 min	Qualifying for race 2 (1 point for pole position)
Saturday	30 min	Race 1 (1 mandatory pit stop)
Sunday	45 min	Race 2 (2 mandatory pit stops)

==== Technical specifications ====
All cars were mechanically identical and had been built with reducing costs in mind, which led to an approximate price for the whole season of €450,000. FA1 used the Lola B05/52, which had been used in the A1 Grand Prix between 2005 and 2008.

- Engine: 3.4L V8 Zytek ZA1348
- Horsepower: 550 hp
- Weight: 698 kg (driver included)
- Gearbox: electronic, six gears
- Tyres: Michelin

=== MW-V6 Pickup Series ===
==== Race format ====
Day	Duration	Event
Friday	30 min	Free practice 1
Friday	30 min	Free practice 2
Friday	20 min	Qualifying for race 1 (1 point for pole position)
Saturday	20 min	Qualifying for race 2 (1 point for pole position)
Saturday	25 min	Race 1 (Rolling start)
Saturday	25 min	Race 2 (Rolling start)
Sunday	40 min	Race 3 (Rolling start and mandatory pitstop)

The starting order of race 3 was decided by a combined result of Q1 and Q2 with the first 8 reversed. For race 1 and 2, the top 10 finishers scored points in the following order: 20, 15, 12, 10, 8, 6, 4, 3, 2, 1. For race 3, the top 10 finishers scored points in the following order: 25, 18, 15, 12, 10, 8, 6, 4, 2, 1. The drivers' champion was entitled to a test day in the 2015 FA1 car plus either half the budget for the 2015 FA1 season or the full budget for the 2015 MW-V6 season.

==== Technical specifications ====
The cars were based on those used in the Dutch racing series BRL V6 and BRL Light.

- Engine: 4.0L V6 Ford, 325 hp
- Gearbox: Drenth DG 400
- Minimum weight: 950 kg
- Tyres: Michelin

=== Legend SuperCup ===
Each LSC team represented a nation. Their drivers may have been a different nationality, but the car, whose design was derived from legends car racing, represented the country. The winning driver/team was entitled to a test day in the 2015 MW-V6 car and half the budget for the 2015 MW-V6 season.

==== Race format ====
Day	Duration	Event
Friday	30 min	Free practice 1
Friday	30 min	Free practice 2
Saturday	20 min	Race 1 (Rolling start)
Saturday	20 min	Race 2 (Rolling start)
Sunday	20 min	Race 3 (Rolling start)
Sunday	20 min	Race 4 (Rolling start)

Lots were drawn by the drivers during the briefing to determine the starting grid for Sprint Race 1. The starting grid for Sprint Race 2 was the reversed Race 1 starting grid. The starting grid for Sprint Race 3 corresponded to the points scored in Races 1 and 2 (the driver who had scored the highest number of points started on the pole). In the case of even results when adding points of races 1 and 2, the fastest lap of races 1 and 2 was to decide between the drivers.

The top 25 finishers scored points in the following order: 50, 40, 32, 26, 22, 20, 19, 18,..., 3, 2, 1.

==== Technical specifications ====
The cars were based on those used in legends car racing.

- Engine: Fuel-injected Yamaha 1250 cc (with or without carburetor)
- Weight empty: 520 kg
- Power: 136 hp at 10,000 rpm
- Acceleration: 0–100 km/h in 3.7 sec
- Top speed: 200 km/h
- Tyres: Michelin/Falken Tires

=== European Stock 600 and 1000 Series ===
Each ACC 600 and ACC 1000 team represented a nation. Their drivers may have been a different nationality, but the motorcycle represented the country.

The top 15 finishers scored points in the following order: 25, 20, 16, 13, 11, 10, 9, 8, 7, 6, 5, 4, 3, 2, 1.

==== Technical specifications ====
European Stock 1000 Series:

- Engine:
  4-cylinder (600-1000 cc) 4-stroke
  3-cylinder (750-1000 cc) 4-stroke
  2-cylinder (850-1200 cc) 4-stroke
- Minimum weight: 165 kg

European Stock 600 Series:

- Engine:
  4-cylinder (401-600 cc) 4-stroke
  3-cylinder (401-675 cc) 4-stroke
  2-cylinder (401-750 cc) 4-stroke
- Minimum weight: 165 kg
