= Sam Dejonghe =

Belgian racing driver (born 1991)

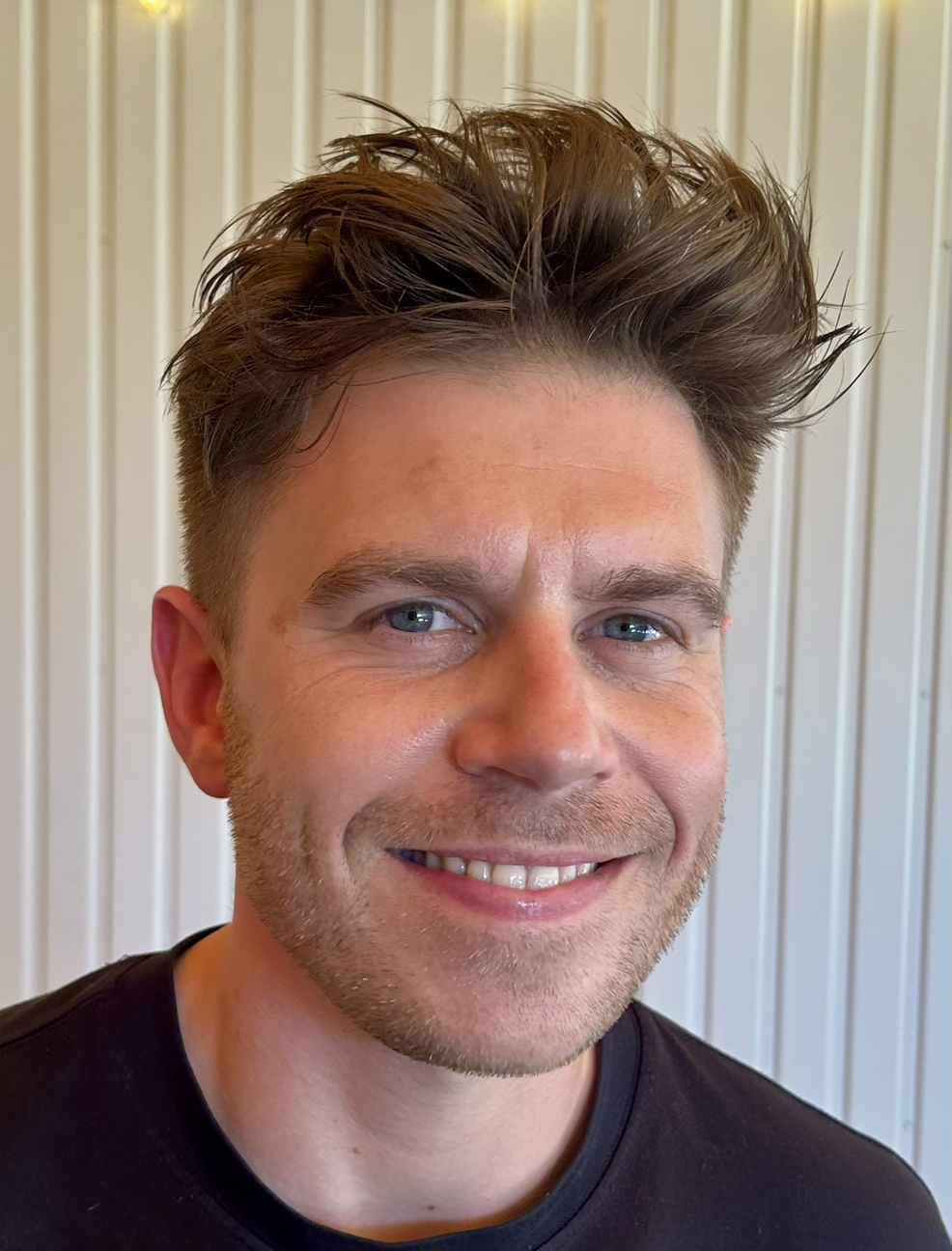
- Dejonghe in 2026 at Nerdland Festival
- Nationality: (Belgium) Belgian
- Born: 2 September 1991 (age 35) Kalmthout, Belgium
- Categorisation: FIA Silver

Championship titles
- 2022 2016 2015: Prototype Challenge – CN; Belcar Endurance Championship; Supercar Challenge – Superlights 1

Sam Dejonghe (born 2 September 1991) is a Belgian racing driver who last raced for Q1-Trackracing at the 24 Hours of Zolder.

== Career ==
Born in Kalmthout, Dejonghe made his single-seater debut in 2010 by joining Team Astromega for the 2010 Formula Renault 2.0 Northern European Cup. After finishing fifth in points, Dejonghe joined Team West-Tec fo step up to the European F3 Open Championship in 2011. Racing in the Copa F306/300 class, Dejonghe took four class wins, which included overall podiums at Algarve and Monza, on his way to runner-up in points to Fabio Gamberini at season's end.

Returning to Team West-Tec for the 2012 season, Dejonghe switched to Class A for his sophomore season in the European F3 Open Championship. Despite his car being delivered three days before the season opener and missing pre-season tests, he finished third in the season-opening race at Algarve. The Belgian then went on to take his only win of the season at the Nürburgring, which helped him to finish fifth in points at season's end despite missing the season-ending round at Barcelona due to budgetary reasons. At the end of the year, Dejonghe competed in the final two rounds of the 2012–13 MRF Challenge Formula 2000 Championship, where he scored two podiums en route to sixth in points at season's end.

After not racing for most of 2013, Dejonghe returned to the 2013–14 MRF Challenge Formula 2000 Championship, where he took his only two wins of the season at the final round at Madras International Circuit as he finished third in points. Dejonghe then joined Virtuosi UK for the 2014 Auto GP Series, where he competed in the first three rounds, scoring his only podium at the Hungaroring before leaving the series.

The following season, Dejonghe made his debut in Supercar Challenge, racing for Deldiche Racing in the Superlights 1 class. Alongside Luc de Cock, the duo won four races on their way to the title at season's end. The following year, Dejonghe transitioned over to the newly-created TCR BeNeLux after being selected as one of two drivers to represent the Royal Automobile Club of Belgium. Dejonghe took won both qualifying races at Zandvoort and Assen as they ended the year third in points. In 2016, Dejonghe also won the overall Belcar Endurance Championship title with Deldiche Racing-

Dejonghe was retained by the RACB for the 2017 TCR BeNeLux season alongside Denis Dupont. After taking his maiden win of the season at Zolder, before winning the back-to-back races at Assen on his way to fifth in points. During 2017, Dejonghe also made a one-off appearance in International GT Open for Aston Martin Brussels Racing and also joined Mahindra Racing as their development driver for the 2017–18 Formula E Championship.

Starting off the 2018 season in with a part-time schedule in the GT4 European Series for Selleslagh Racing Team, Dejonghe then raced in the 24 Hours of Spa for Brussels Racing, before returning to Mahindra Racing as their development driver for the 2018–19 Formula E Championship.

In 2019, Dejonghe joined Inter Europol Competition to race in the LMP3 class of the European Le Mans Series from Monza to Silverstone, before switching to the team's LMP2 program ahead of Spa. At the end of the year, Dejonghe was retained as a test and reserve driver for Mahindra Racing ahead of the 2019–20 Formula E Championship.

After returning to the Supercar Challenge during 2019, Dejonghe remained in the series for the next three seasons, which culminated in him winning the CN title in 2022 alongside Thomas Piessens. Dejonghe also joined RedAnt Racing in 2022 to make his debut in Porsche Carrera Cup Benelux. In his rookie season in the series, Dejonghe took three podiums and finished fourth in points.

Following his Prototype Challenge title, Dejonghe returned to GT3 competition by joining Audi-affiliated Comtoyou Racing for the 2023 GT World Challenge Europe Endurance Cup alongside Loris Hezemans and Finlay Hutchison. Having taken a class win at Monza, the trio scored three more class podiums as they finished runner-up in the Silver Cup at season's end. During 2023, Dejonghe also returned to RedAnt Racing for a second season in Porsche Carrera Cup Benelux. In his sophomore season in the series, Dejonghe took a lone podium at the Hockenheimring and ended the year sixth in points.

Dejonghe returned to Comtoyou Racing for 2024, joining Matisse Lismont and Charles Clark in the team's second Silver Cup lineup as the team switched to Aston Martin. Following a best result of 32nd at the 24 Hours of Spa, Dejonghe was replaced by Job van Uitert as the team shuffled its non-pro lineups after the 3 Hours of Nürburgring. The following year, Dejonghe finished third at the 24 Hours of Zolder for Q1-Trackracing.

== Karting record ==
=== Karting career summary ===
Season	Series	Team	Position
2005	Championnat de Belgique — ICA Junior		14th
2006	WSK International Series — ICA Junior		31st
2006	Championnat de Belgique — ICA Junior		5th
2007	Rotax Euro Challenge — Rotax Junior	DNR	44th
2008	Andrea Margutti Trophy — KF2	Kosmic Kart Racing	NC
2008	WSK International Series — KF2	Kosmic Kart Racing	65th
2008	Karting European Championship — KF2	Kosmic Kart Racing	NC
2008	Karting World Cup — KF2	Kosmic Kart Racing	NC
2008	Championnat de Belgique – KF2		3rd
2008	Benelux Karting Series – KF2		10th
2009	Karting European Championship — KZ2	Pepe Kart Racing	82nd
2012	GK4 Four-Stroke Kart Series – VT250 Senior		18th

== Racing record ==
=== Racing career summary ===
Season	Series	Team	Races	Wins	Poles	F/Laps	Podiums	Points	Position
2010	Formula Renault 2.0 Northern European Cup	Team Astromega	19	0	0	0	0	223	5th
2011	European F3 Open Championship – Copa F306/300	Team West-Tec F3	16	4	0	0	15	118	**2nd**
2012	European F3 Open Championship	Team West-Tec F3	14	1	0	1	4	159	5th
2012–13	MRF Challenge Formula 2000	MRF Racing	8	0	0	1	2	77	6th
2013–14	MRF Challenge Formula 2000	MRF Racing	13	2	0	0	6	142	**3rd**
2014	Auto GP Series	Virtuosi UK	6	0	0	0	1	41	10th
2015	Supercar Challenge – Supersport	Deldiche Racing	2	0	0	0	0	0	NC
2015	Supercar Challenge – Superlights 1	Deldiche Racing	10	4	10	3	7	132	**1st**
2015	BMW M235i Racing Cup Belgium	Tyreset / Peka Racing	2	0	0	0	1	20	32nd
2015	24 Hours of Zolder - Class 1 CN 2000		1	0	0	0	0	—N/a	4th
2015–16	MRF Challenge Formula 2000	MRF Racing	2	0	0	0	0	8	19th
2016	TCR BeNeLux Touring Car Championship	RACB National Team	18	2	1	1	7	314‡	**3rd‡**
2016	Belcar Endurance Championship	Deldiche Racing							**1st**
2016	Supercar Challenge – Superlights 1	Prime Racing	1	0	0	0	0	0	NC
2017	TCR BeNeLux Touring Car Championship	Team WRT	18	3	1	0	8	316‡	5th‡
2017	GT4 European Series Northern Cup – Silver	Allied Racing	2	0	0	0	0	10	30th
2017	International GT Open	Aston Martin Brussels Racing	2	0	0	0	0	0	NC
2017	GT & Prototype Challenge – LMP3	Equipe Verschuur	2	1	1	1	2	49	6th
2017	GT & Prototype Challenge – CN	Deldiche Racing	2	0	0	0	0	0	NC
2017–18	Formula E	Mahindra Racing	Test driver						
2018	GT4 European Series – Silver	Selleslagh Racing Team	4	0	0	0	0	14	23rd
2018	GT4 Belgium Cup	Selleslagh Racing Team	4						
2018	Belgian Endurance	Deldiche Racing by JDC Events	2	0	2	1	0	170.5	5th
2018	25 Hours VW Fun Cup	Clubsport Racing	1	0	0	0	0	—N/a	10th
2018	Blancpain GT Series Endurance Cup – Pro-Am	Brussels Racing	1	0	0	0	0	1	28th
2018–19	Formula E	Mahindra Racing	Test driver						
2019	European Le Mans Series – LMP2	Inter Europol Competition	1	0	0	0	0	0.5	35th
2019	European Le Mans Series – LMP3	Inter Europol Competition	3	0	0	0	0	2	21st
2019	24H TCE Series – TCR	AC Motorsport	1	0	0	0	0	0	NC
2019	GT & Prototype Challenge – CN	Deldiche Racing	2	0	0	0	2	44	6th
2019–20	Formula E	Mahindra Racing	Test and reserve driver						
2020	GT & Prototype Challenge – CN	Deldiche Racing	1	0	0	0	0	0	NC
2021	GT & Prototype Challenge – CN	Deldiche Racing	6	4	2	3	6	134	4th
2022	Porsche Carrera Cup Benelux	TeamPGZ by Red Ant Racing	10	0	0	0	3	112	4th
2022	Prototype Challenge – CN	Deldiche Racing	12	6	5	0	10	223	**1st**
2022	24H GT Series – 992	Red Ant Racing	2	0	0	0	0	0	NC
2022–23	Middle East Trophy – TCR	AC Motorsport	1	1	0	0	1	40	NC
2023	Porsche Sprint Challenge Southern Europe - Pro	Nationale Autoclub Excelsior / Redant Racing	6	0	0	0	1	67	5th
2023	Porsche Carrera Cup Benelux	RedAnt Racing	12	0	0	0	1	107	6th
2023	GT World Challenge Europe Endurance Cup – Silver	Comtoyou Racing	5	1	0	1	4	100	**2nd**
2023	24H GT Series – 992 Am	Red Ant Racing	1	1	0	1	1	0	NC
2024	GT World Challenge Europe Endurance Cup – Silver	Comtoyou Racing	3	0	0	0	0	37	14th
2025	24 Hours of Zolder	Q1-Trackracing	1	0	0	0	1	—N/a	**3rd**

‡ Team standings

=== Complete Formula Renault 2.0 NEC results ===
(key) (Races in bold indicate pole position) (Races in italics indicate fastest lap)

Year	Entrant	1	2	3	4	5	6	7	8	9	10	11	12	13	14	15	16	17	18	19	20	DC	Points
2010	Team Astromega	HOC; 1; 16	HOC; 2 Ret	BRN; 1; 10	BRN; 2; 13	ZAN; 1; 5	ZAN; 2; 12	OSC; 1; 7	OSC; 2; 5	OSC; 3; 7	ASS; 1; 9	ASS; 2; 11	MST; 1; 6	MST; 2; 7	MST; 3; 10	SPA; 1; 6	SPA; 2; 10	SPA; 3 Ret	NÜR; 1; 13	NÜR; 2; 10	NÜR; 3 C	5th	223

=== Complete Auto GP results ===
(key) (Races in bold indicate pole position) (Races in italics indicate fastest lap)

Year	Entrant	1	2	3	4	5	6	7	8	9	10	11	12	13	14	15	16	Pos	Points
2014	Virtuosi UK	MAR; 1; 5	MAR; 2; 8†	LEC; 1 Ret	LEC; 2; 6	HUN; 1; 5	HUN; 2; 3	MNZ; 1	MNZ; 2	IMO; 1	IMO; 2	RBR; 1	RBR; 2	NÜR; 1	NÜR; 2	EST; 1	EST; 2	10th	41

=== Complete GT World Challenge Europe results ===
==== GT World Challenge Europe Endurance Cup ====
Year	Team	Car	Class	1	2	3	4	5	6	7	Pos.	Points
2018	Brussels Racing	Aston Martin V12 Vantage GT3	Pro-Am	MON	SIL	LEC	SPA; 6H; 50	SPA; 12H; 48	SPA; 24H; 45	CAT	28th	1
2023	Comtoyou Racing	Audi R8 LMS Evo II	Silver	MNZ; 16	LEC; 19	SPA; 6H; 33	SPA; 12H; 22	SPA; 24H; 19	NÜR; 27	CAT; 33	2nd	100
2024	Comtoyou Racing	Aston Martin Vantage AMR GT3 Evo	Silver	LEC; 41	SPA; 6H; 8	SPA; 12H; 45	SPA; 24H; 32	NÜR; 45	MNZ	JED	14th	37

=== Complete European Le Mans Series results ===
(key) (Races in bold indicate pole position) (Races in italics indicate fastest lap)

Year	Entrant	Class	Chassis	Engine	1	2	3	4	5	6	Rank	Points
2019	Inter Europol Competition	LMP3	Ligier JS P3	Gibson GK428 4.2 L V8	LEC	MNZ; 9	CAT; Ret	SIL; Ret			21st	2
2019	Inter Europol Competition	LMP2	Ligier JS P217	Gibson GK428 4.2 L V8					SPA; 12	ALG; Ret	35th	0.5

^{*} Season still in progress.
