= 2021 GT & Prototype Challenge =

Car racing competition

The 2021 GT & Prototype Challenge powered by Hankook was the fifth season of the GT & Prototype Challenge. It began at the Hockenheimring on 21 May and ended at TT Circuit Assen on 31 October.

== Calendar ==
Round	Circuit	Date	Event	Notes
1	Hockenheimring, Germany	21–23 May		Supporting 2021 12 Hours of Hockenheimring.
2	Circuit de Spa-Francorchamps, Belgium	4–6 June	Spa Euro Races	
3	Circuit Zolder, Belgium	16–18 July	Supercar Madness	
4	TT Circuit Assen, Netherlands	6–8 August	Gamma Racing Day	VRM BMW M2 Cup competitors contested both races with the SCC and GT&PC cars.
5	TT Circuit Assen, Netherlands	17–19 September		Supporting 2021 Deutsche Tourenwagen Masters, VRM BMW M2 Cup competitors contested both races with the SCC and GT&PC cars.
6	Circuit de Spa-Francorchamps, Belgium	16–17 October	Racing Festival	VRM BMW M2 Cup competitors contested both races with the SCC and GT&PC cars.
7	TT Circuit Assen, Netherlands	29–31 October	Hankook Finale Races	

== Entry list ==
Team	Chassis	Engine	No.	Drivers	Rounds
LMP3
(Germany) EDEKA Aschoff Racing	Ginetta G58	Ginetta Billet Block 6.2 L V8	521	(Germany) Max Aschoff	1, 5–7
(France) Pegasus Racing	Ligier JS P320	Nissan VK56DE 5.6 L V8	529	(France) Julien Schell	1
(Spain) BE Motorsport	Ligier JS P320	Nissan VK56DE 5.6 L V8	593	(Spain) Javier Ibran Pardo	6
Group CN
(Belgium) Deldiche Racing	Norma M20 FC	Honda K20A 2.0 L I4	610	(Belgium) Thomas Piessens	1–4, 6–7
(Belgium) Deldiche Racing	Norma M20 FC	Honda K20A 2.0 L I4	610	(Belgium) Sam Dejonghe	1–4, 7
(Belgium) Deldiche Racing	Norma M20 FC	Honda K20A 2.0 L I4	610	(Belgium) Tim Verbergt	6
(Belgium) Deldiche Racing	Norma M20 FC	Honda K20A 2.0 L I4	610	(Belgium) Luc de Cock	7
(Belgium) Deldiche Racing	Norma M20 FC	Honda K20A 2.0 L I4	611	(Belgium) Tom Boonen	1–4, 6
(Belgium) Deldiche Racing	Norma M20 FC	Honda K20A 2.0 L I4	621	(Belgium) Tim Joosen	1–4
(Belgium) Deldiche Racing	Norma M20 FC	Honda K20A 2.0 L I4	621	(Belgium) Steve van Bellingen	1–2
(Belgium) Deldiche Racing	Norma M20 FC	Honda K20A 2.0 L I4	621	(Belgium) Luc de Cock	3–4
(Belgium) Deldiche Racing	Norma M20 FC	Honda K20A 2.0 L I4	621	(Belgium) Tom Boonen	7
(France) BS Racing by Baticonsult	Norma M20 FC	Honda K20A 2.0 L I4	614	(Luxembourg) Alain Berg	1, 3–7
(France) BS Racing by Baticonsult	Norma M20 FC	Honda K20A 2.0 L I4	614	(Romania) Alex Cascatău	1, 3–5
(France) BS Racing by Baticonsult	Norma M20 FC	Honda K20A 2.0 L I4	614	(United Kingdom) Charlie Martin	6
(Belgium) McDonald's Racing	Norma M20 FC	Honda K20A 2.0 L I4	630	(Belgium) François Bouillon	3
(Belgium) McDonald's Racing	Norma M20 FC	Honda K20A 2.0 L I4	630	(Belgium) Karlo Van Dosselaer	3
(Belgium) ART Racing	Wolf GB08	Honda K20A 2.0 L I4	666	(Germany) Phil Hill	2
(Belgium) ART Racing	Wolf GB08	Honda K20A 2.0 L I4	666	(United Kingdom) Jamie Morrow	2
(Belgium) ART Racing	Wolf GB08	Honda K20A 2.0 L I4	666	(Belgium) Muth O'Neill	2
SR3 - Praga
(Belgium) Domec Racing	Radical SR3	Suzuki RPE 1.5 L I4	703	(Senegal) Nagy Kabaz	3
(Belgium) Domec Racing	Radical SR3	Suzuki RPE 1.5 L I4	750	(Belgium) Martin Lucas	6
(Netherlands) Zoet Racing	Radical SR3	Suzuki RPE 1.5 L I4	704	(Netherlands) Max de Bruijn	4
(Netherlands) Zoet Racing	Radical SR3	Suzuki RPE 1.5 L I4	704	(Netherlands) Melvin van Dam	4
(Belgium) Xwift Racing Events	Radical SR3 RSX	Suzuki RPE 1.5 L I4	777	(Belgium) Pieter Denys	2
(Belgium) Xwift Racing Events	Radical SR3 RSX	Suzuki RPE 1.5 L I4	777	(Belgium) Bart Vingerhoedt	6
(Belgium) Xwift Racing Events	Radical SR3 RSX	Suzuki RPE 1.5 L I4	777	(Belgium) Mathijs Wouters	6
(Belgium) Xwift Racing Events	Radical SR3 RSX	Suzuki RPE 1.5 L I4	778	(Belgium) Frank Wilsens	2
(Belgium) Xwift Racing Events	Praga R1T	Renault F4R 832 2.0 L I4	778	(Belgium) Steven Dewulf	6
(Belgium) Xwift Racing Events	Praga R1T	Renault F4R 832 2.0 L I4	778	(Belgium) Axel Vanoosthuyse	6

== Race results ==
Bold indicates overall winner.

Round		Circuit	LMP3 Winning Car	Group CN Winning Car	SR3 - Praga Winning Car
Round		Circuit	LMP3 Winning Drivers	Group CN Winning Drivers	SR3 - Praga Winning Drivers
1	R1	(Germany) Hockenheimring	(France) No. 529 Pegasus Racing	**(Belgium) No. 611 Deldiche Racing**	No entries
1	R1	(Germany) Hockenheimring	(France) Julien Schell	**(Belgium) Tom Boonen**	No entries
1	R2	(Germany) Hockenheimring	(France) No. 529 Pegasus Racing	**(Belgium) No. 621 Deldiche Racing**	No entries
1	R2	(Germany) Hockenheimring	(France) Julien Schell	**(Belgium) Tim Joosen** **(Belgium) Steve van Bellingen**	No entries
3	R1	(Belgium) Spa-Francorchamps	Races cancelled due to weather and damage to circuit		
3	R2	(Belgium) Spa-Francorchamps	Races cancelled due to weather and damage to circuit		
3	R1	(Belgium) Zolder	No entries	**(Belgium) No. 610 Deldiche Racing**	(Belgium) No. 703 Domec Racing
3	R1	(Belgium) Zolder	No entries	**(Belgium) Sam Dejonghe** **(Belgium) Thomas Piessens**	(Senegal) Nagy Kabaz
3	R2	(Belgium) Zolder	No entries	**(Belgium) No. 611 Deldiche Racing**	(Belgium) No. 703 Domec Racing
3	R2	(Belgium) Zolder	No entries	**(Belgium) Tom Boonen**	(Senegal) Nagy Kabaz
4	R1	(Netherlands) Assen	No entries	**(Belgium) No. 610 Deldiche Racing**	(Netherlands) No. 704 Zoet Racing
4	R1	(Netherlands) Assen	No entries	**(Belgium) Sam Dejonghe** **(Belgium) Thomas Piessens**	(Netherlands) Max de Bruijn (Netherlands) Melvin van Dam
4	R2	(Netherlands) Assen	No entries	**(Belgium) No. 610 Deldiche Racing**	(Netherlands) No. 704 Zoet Racing
4	R2	(Netherlands) Assen	No entries	**(Belgium) Sam Dejonghe** **(Belgium) Thomas Piessens**	(Netherlands) Max de Bruijn (Netherlands) Melvin van Dam
5	R1	(Netherlands) Assen	**(Germany) No. 621 EDEKA Aschoff Racing**	(France) No. 614 BS Racing by Baticonsult	No entries
5	R1	(Netherlands) Assen	**(Germany) Max Aschoff**	(Luxembourg) Alain Berg (Romania) Alex Cascatău	No entries
5	R2	(Netherlands) Assen	**(Germany) No. 621 EDEKA Aschoff Racing**	(France) No. 614 BS Racing by Baticonsult	No entries
5	R2	(Netherlands) Assen	**(Germany) Max Aschoff**	(Luxembourg) Alain Berg (Romania) Alex Cascatău	No entries
6	R1	(Belgium) Spa-Francorchamps	(Germany) No. 621 EDEKA Aschoff Racing	**(Belgium) No. 610 Deldiche Racing**	(Belgium) No. 778 Xwift Racing Events
6	R1	(Belgium) Spa-Francorchamps	(Germany) Max Aschoff	**(Belgium) Thomas Piessens** **(Belgium) Tim Verbergt**	(Belgium) Steven Dewulf (Belgium) Axel Vanoosthuyse
6	R2	(Belgium) Spa-Francorchamps	(Germany) No. 621 EDEKA Aschoff Racing	**(Belgium) No. 610 Deldiche Racing**	(Belgium) No. 778 Xwift Racing Events
6	R2	(Belgium) Spa-Francorchamps	(Germany) Max Aschoff	**(Belgium) Thomas Piessens** **(Belgium) Tim Verbergt**	(Belgium) Steven Dewulf (Belgium) Axel Vanoosthuyse
7	R1	(Netherlands) Assen	(Germany) No. 621 EDEKA Aschoff Racing	**(Belgium) No. 611 Deldiche Racing**	No entries
7	R1	(Netherlands) Assen	(Germany) Max Aschoff	**(Belgium) Tom Boonen**	No entries
7	R2	(Netherlands) Assen	(Germany) No. 621 EDEKA Aschoff Racing	**(Belgium) No. 610 Deldiche Racing**	No entries
7	R2	(Netherlands) Assen	(Germany) Max Aschoff	**(Belgium) Sam Dejonghe** **(Belgium) Luc de Cock** **(Belgium) Thomas Piessens**	No entries

=== Championships standings ===
Position	**1st**	**2nd**	**3rd**	**4th**	**5th**	**6th**	**7th**	**8th**	**9th**	**10th**	**11th**	**Pole**
Points	23	20	17	15	13	11	9	7	5	3	1	1

Pos.	Driver	Team	(Germany) HOC		(Belgium) SPA		(Belgium) ZOL		(Netherlands) ASS		(Netherlands) ASS		(Belgium) SPA		(Netherlands) ASS		Points
LMP3
1	(Germany) Max Aschoff	(Germany) EDEKA Aschoff Racing	**3**	Ret							**1**	1	**48**	2	**23**	2	162
2	(France) Julien Schell	(France) Pegasus Racing	2	3													46
	(Spain) Javier Ibran Pardo	(Spain) BE Motorsport											WD	WD			
Group CN
1	(Belgium) Tom Boonen	(Belgium) Deldiche Racing	1	19	C	C	23	1	2	7			47	9	**4**	3	196
2	(Belgium) Thomas Piessens	(Belgium) Deldiche Racing	DNS	DNS	C	C	**1**	2	**1**	1			**1**	1	5	1	181
3	(Luxembourg) Alain Berg	(France) BS Racing by Baticonsult	21	DNS			2	10	Ret	Ret	**2**	3	4	8	6	5	173
4	(Belgium) Sam Dejonghe	(Belgium) Deldiche Racing	DNS	DNS	C	C	**1**	2	**1**	1					5	1	134
5	(Belgium) Tim Joosen	(Belgium) Deldiche Racing	**4**	1	C	C	3	3	3	2							115
6	(Belgium) Luc de Cock	(Belgium) Deldiche Racing					3	3	3	2					5	1	114
7	(Romania) Alex Cascatău	(France) BS Racing by Baticonsult	21	DNS			2	10	Ret	Ret							99
8	(Belgium) Tim Verbergt	(Belgium) Deldiche Racing											**1**	1			47
9	(Belgium) Steve van Bellingen	(Belgium) Deldiche Racing	**4**	1	C	C											44
10	(United Kingdom) Charlie Martin	(France) BS Racing by Baticonsult											4	8			40
	(Belgium) François Bouillon (Belgium) Karlo Van Dosselaer	(Belgium) McDonald's Racing					Ret	Ret									0
	(Germany) Phil Hill (United Kingdom) Jamie Morrow (Belgium) Muth O'Neill	(Belgium) ART Racing			C	C											
SR3 - Praga
1	(Netherlands) Max de Bruijn (Netherlands) Melvin van Dam	(Netherlands) Zoet Racing							**27**	**12**							47
2	(Senegal) Nagy Kabaz	(Belgium) Domec Racing					**20**	**24**									47
3	(Belgium) Steven Dewulf (Belgium) Axel Vanoosthuyse	(Belgium) Xwift Racing Events											10	6			46
4	(Belgium) Martin Lucas	(Belgium) Domec Racing											**12**	14			41
5	(Belgium) Bart Vingerhoedt (Belgium) Mathijs Wouters	(Belgium) Xwift Racing Events											45	30			36
	(Belgium) Pieter Denys	(Belgium) Xwift Racing Events			C	C											
	(Belgium) Frank Wilsens	(Belgium) Xwift Racing Events			C	C											
Pos.	Driver	Team	(Germany) HOC		(Belgium) SPA		(Belgium) ZOL		(Netherlands) ASS		(Netherlands) ASS		(Belgium) SPA		(Netherlands) ASS		Points

Key
Colour	Result
Gold	Winner
Silver	Second place
Bronze	Third place
Green	Other points position
Blue	Other classified position
Blue	Not classified, finished (NC)
Purple	Not classified, retired (Ret)
Red	Did not qualify (DNQ)
Red	Did not pre-qualify (DNPQ)
Black	Disqualified (DSQ)
White	Did not start (DNS)
White	Race cancelled (C)
Blank	Did not practice (DNP)
Blank	Excluded (EX)
Blank	Did not arrive (DNA)
Blank	Withdrawn (WD)
Blank	Did not enter (cell empty)
Text formatting	Meaning
**Bold**	Pole position
Italics	Fastest lap
