= 2020 GT & Prototype Challenge =

Car racing competition

The 2020 GT & Prototype Challenge was the fourth series of the GT & Prototype Challenge. The GT and Superlights classes of the Supercar Challenge were split from the original series to form the new championship.

== Regulations ==
The series entrants are divided over four classes. The GT class, from the Supercar Challenge Super GT class, forms the highest and fastest division. Cars with a 2,8kg per HP or more ratio are allowed to compete. This includes all Group GT3 class cars and specially built GT's such as the Solution F built Volvo S60 and Renault Sport R.S. 01. LMP3 spec cars first raced in the Supercar Challenge Super GT class in 2016. The class forms a separate class within the series open to all 2016 specification LMP3 machinery.

Two classes from the Supercar Challenge Superlights class are included in the new series. The fastest of the two is the Group CN class. Group CN specification cars built after 2014 are allowed to compete. The fourth, and slowest, class is the Radical SR3 class. Mainly a Radical SR3 spec class, the class is open to cars with comparable lap times. Also allowed are the Praga R1 and pre-2014 Group CN class cars.

== Calendar ==
Round	Circuit	Date	Classes	Event	Notes
1	Circuit Zandvoort, Netherlands	21–23 August	All	Attic Superprix	
2	TT Circuit Assen, Netherlands	4–6 September	All		Supporting 2020 Deutsche Tourenwagen Masters.
3	TT Circuit Assen, Netherlands	25–27 September	All	Gamma Racing Day	
4	Circuit Zandvoort, Netherlands	9–11 October	All	Voorjaars Races	
Cancelled due to the 2019-20 coronavirus pandemic
	Circuit Zolder, Belgium	7–9 August	All	Attic Superprix	
	TT Circuit Assen, Netherlands	30 October–1 November	All	Hankook Finale Races	Supporting 2020 ADAC TCR Germany Touring Car Championship
	Circuit Zolder, Belgium	5 November	All	Hankook Finale Races	

== Entry list ==
Team	Chassis	Engine	No.	Drivers	Rounds
LMP3
(Germany) EDEKA Aschoff Racing	Ginetta G58	Ginetta Billet Block 6.2L V8	503	(Germany) Max Aschoff	2
Group CN
(Belgium) Deldiche Racing	Norma M20 FC	Honda K20A 2.0L I4	611	(Belgium) Tom Boonen	2
(Belgium) Deldiche Racing	Norma M20 FC	Honda K20A 2.0L I4	611	(Belgium) Sam Dejonghe	2
(Belgium) Deldiche Racing	Norma M20 FC	Honda K20A 2.0L I4	621	(Belgium) Tim Joosen	2–3
(Belgium) Deldiche Racing	Norma M20 FC	Honda K20A 2.0L I4	621	(Belgium) Luc de Cock	2
(France) BS Racing by Baticonsult	Norma M20 FC	Honda K20A 2.0L I4	614	(Luxembourg) Alain Berg	2–3
(France) BS Racing by Baticonsult	Norma M20 FC	Honda K20A 2.0L I4	614	(Romania) Alex Cascatău	2–3
(France) BS Racing by Baticonsult	Radical SR3 RSX	Suzuki RPE 1.5L I4	614	(Luxembourg) Alain Berg	4
(France) BS Racing by Baticonsult	Radical SR3 RSX	Suzuki RPE 1.5L I4	614	(Romania) Alex Cascatău	4
SR3 - Praga
(United Kingdom) Revolution Race Cars	Revolution A-One	Ford 3.7L V6	704	(Germany) Dominik Dierkes	3

== Race results ==
Round		Circuit	LMP3 Winning Car	Group CN Winning Car	SR3 - Praga Winning Car
Round		Circuit	LMP3 Winning Drivers	Group CN Winning Drivers	SR3 - Praga Winning Drivers
1	R1	(Netherlands) Zandvoort	No entries	No entries	No entries
1	R1	(Netherlands) Zandvoort	No entries	No entries	No entries
1	R2	(Netherlands) Zandvoort	No entries	No entries	No entries
1	R2	(Netherlands) Zandvoort	No entries	No entries	No entries
2	R1	(Netherlands) Assen	(Germany) No. 503 EDEKA Aschoff Racing	(France) No. 614 BS Racing by Baticonsult	No entries
2	R1	(Netherlands) Assen	(Germany) Max Aschoff	(Luxembourg) Alain Berg (Romania) Alex Cascatău	No entries
2	R2	(Netherlands) Assen	(Germany) No. 503 EDEKA Aschoff Racing	(France) No. 614 BS Racing by Baticonsult	No entries
2	R2	(Netherlands) Assen	(Germany) Max Aschoff	(Luxembourg) Alain Berg (Romania) Alex Cascatău	No entries
3	R1	(Netherlands) Assen	No entries	(France) No. 614 BS Racing by Baticonsult	(United Kingdom) No. 704 Revolution Race Cars
3	R1	(Netherlands) Assen	No entries	(Luxembourg) Alain Berg (Romania) Alex Cascatău	(Germany) Dominik Dierkes
3	R2	(Netherlands) Assen	No entries	(Belgium) No. 621 Deldiche Racing	(United Kingdom) No. 704 Revolution Race Cars
3	R2	(Netherlands) Assen	No entries	(Belgium) Tim Joosen	(Germany) Dominik Dierkes
4	R1	(Netherlands) Zandvoort	No entries	(France) No. 614 BS Racing by Baticonsult	No entries
4	R1	(Netherlands) Zandvoort	No entries	(Luxembourg) Alain Berg (Romania) Alex Cascatău	No entries
4	R2	(Netherlands) Zandvoort	No entries	(France) No. 614 BS Racing by Baticonsult	No entries
4	R2	(Netherlands) Zandvoort	No entries	(Luxembourg) Alain Berg (Romania) Alex Cascatău	No entries

=== Drivers' championships ===
Position	**1st**	**2nd**	**3rd**	**4th**	**5th**	**6th**	**7th**	**8th**	**9th**	**10th**	**11th**	**Pole**
Points	23	20	17	15	13	11	9	7	5	3	1	1

Pos.	Driver	Team	(Netherlands) ZAN1	(Netherlands) ASS1		(Netherlands) ASS2		(Netherlands) ZAN2		Points
LMP3
1	(Germany) Max Aschoff	(Germany) EDEKA Aschoff Racing		**22**	23					47
CN
1	(Luxembourg) Alain Berg (Romania) Alex Cascatău	(France) BS Racing by Baticonsult		**1**	1	**1**	2	**20**	3	91
2	(Belgium) Tim Joosen	(Belgium) Deldiche Racing		9	Ret	2	1			63
3	(Belgium) Luc de Cock	(Belgium) Deldiche Racing		9	Ret					20
	(Belgium) Tom Boonen (Belgium) Sam Dejonghe	(Belgium) Deldiche Racing		DNS	Ret					0
SR3 - Praga
1	(Germany) Dominik Dierkes	(United Kingdom) Revolution Race Cars				**23**	24			47
Pos.	Driver	Team	(Netherlands) ZAN1	(Netherlands) ASS1		(Netherlands) ASS2		(Netherlands) ZAN2		Points

Key
Colour	Result
Gold	Winner
Silver	Second place
Bronze	Third place
Green	Other points position
Blue	Other classified position
Blue	Not classified, finished (NC)
Purple	Not classified, retired (Ret)
Red	Did not qualify (DNQ)
Red	Did not pre-qualify (DNPQ)
Black	Disqualified (DSQ)
White	Did not start (DNS)
White	Race cancelled (C)
Blank	Did not practice (DNP)
Blank	Excluded (EX)
Blank	Did not arrive (DNA)
Blank	Withdrawn (WD)
Blank	Did not enter (cell empty)
Text formatting	Meaning
**Bold**	Pole position
Italics	Fastest lap
