= 2022 Prototype Challenge =

Car racing competition

The 2022 Prototype Challenge powered by Hankook was the sixth season of the Prototype Challenge. It began at Hockenheimring 14 May and ended at TT Circuit Assen on 30 October.

== Calendar ==
Round	Circuit	Date	Event	Notes
NC	Circuit Zandvoort, Netherlands	8–10 April		Only prototypes that contested both races were SPC entries.
1	Hockenheimring, Germany	13–15 May		Supporting 2022 12 Hours of Hockenheimring.
2	Circuit Zolder, Belgium	12–13 June	Supercar Madness	
3	Circuit de Spa-Francorchamps, Belgium	15–17 July	Spa Euro Races	Both races contested with Sports Prototype Cup entries.
4	TT Circuit Assen, Netherlands	5–7 August	JACK'S Racing Day	
5	Circuit de Spa-Francorchamps, Belgium	14–16 October	Racing Festival	Both races contested with Funyo Cup competitors.
6	TT Circuit Assen, Netherlands	28–30 October	Hankook Finale Races	

== Entry list ==
Team	Chassis	Engine	No.	Drivers	Rounds
Non-championship entries
Sports Prototype Cup
(United Kingdom) Revolution Race Cars	Revolution A-One 427SC	Ford 3.7 L V6	1	(United Kingdom) Abbie Eaton	NC
(United Kingdom) Revolution Race Cars	Revolution A-One 427SC	Ford 3.7 L V6	1	(Portugal) Jorge Calado	NC
(United Kingdom) Revolution Race Cars	Revolution A-One 427SC	Ford 3.7 L V6	1	(United Kingdom) Chris Hoy	3
(United Kingdom) Revolution Race Cars	Revolution A-One 427SC	Ford 3.7 L V6	19	(United States) Ron Fletcher	3
(United Kingdom) Revolution Race Cars	Revolution A-One 500SC	Ford 3.7 L V6	24	(United States) Gregg Gorski	NC, 3
(United Kingdom) Revolution Race Cars	Revolution A-One 500SC	Ford 3.7 L V6	74	(United Kingdom) James Abbott	NC
(United Kingdom) Revolution Race Cars	Revolution A-One 500SC	Ford 3.7 L V6	58	(Luxembourg) Pierre Schroeder	3
(United Kingdom) Revolution Race Cars	Revolution A-One 500SC	Ford 3.7 L V6	500	(United Kingdom) Richard Morris	NC, 3
(South Korea) URO Motorsports	Revolution A-One 500SC	Ford 3.7 L V6	5	(Singapore) Tang Tien Foo Roy	3
(South Korea) URO Motorsports	Revolution A-One 500SC	Ford 3.7 L V6	25	(Singapore) Goh Eng Peng	3
(South Korea) URO Motorsports	Revolution A-One 500SC	Ford 3.7 L V6	25	(South Korea) Kim Hyunjun	3
(South Korea) URO Motorsports	Revolution A-One 427SC	Ford 3.7 L V6	55	(South Korea) Rho Seung Min	3
(South Korea) URO Motorsports	Revolution A-One 427SC	Ford 3.7 L V6	55	(South Korea) Yu Changwook	3
(Monaco) Costa Racing	Revolution A-One 500SC	Ford 3.7 L V6	11	(Monaco) Alain Costa	NC, 3
(Switzerland) Race Performance	Revolution A-One 427SC	Ford 3.7 L V6	29	(Italy) Marco Cennetti	3
(Switzerland) Race Performance	Revolution A-One 427SC	Ford 3.7 L V6	29	(Switzerland) Marcello Marrateotto	3
(United Kingdom) Valour Performance Technology	Radical RXC Spyder	Ford 3.7 L V6	31	(United Kingdom) Michael Clark	3
(United Kingdom) Valour Performance Technology	Radical SR10	Ford 2.3 L V6	63	(United States) James Booth	3
(United Kingdom) Valour Performance Technology	Radical SR3	Suzuki RPE 1.5 L I4	77	(United States) David Morales	3
(United Kingdom) Valour Performance Technology	Radical SR3	Suzuki RPE 1.5 L I4	77	(United Kingdom) Matthew Rees	3
(United Kingdom) 360 Racing	Radical SR3	Suzuki RPE 1.5 L I4	49	(United Kingdom) Cian Shields	3
(United Kingdom) Breakell Racing	Radical SR3	Suzuki RPE 1.5 L I4	70	(United Kingdom) Andy Cummings	3
(United Kingdom) Breakell Racing	Radical SR3	Suzuki RPE 1.5 L I4	70	(United Kingdom) Bradley Ellis	3
Funyo Cup
(France) HMC	Funyo SP05 Evo	Peugeot 1.6 L I4	206	(France) Xavier Cousin	5
(France) HMC	Funyo SP05 Evo	Peugeot 1.6 L I4	221	(France) Bruno Fretin	5
(France) HMC	Funyo SP05 Evo	Peugeot 1.6 L I4	224	(France) Franck Artuit	5
(France) HMC	Funyo SP05 Evo	Peugeot 1.6 L I4	224	(France) Julien Charitour	5
(France) HMC	Funyo SP05 Evo	Peugeot 1.6 L I4	225	(France) Eric Mary	5
(France) HMC	Funyo SP05 Evo	Peugeot 1.6 L I4	225	(France) Sebastien Viale	5
(France) HMC	Funyo SP05 Evo	Peugeot 1.6 L I4	228	(France) Jean-Claude Rolland	5
(France) HMC	Funyo SP05 Evo	Peugeot 1.6 L I4	230	(France) Ridel Benoit Stekr	5
(France) HMC	Funyo SP05 Evo	Peugeot 1.6 L I4	230	(France) Guillaume Yaouanc	5
(France) HMC	Funyo SP05 Evo	Peugeot 1.6 L I4	262	(France) Remy Brouard	5
(France) HMC	Funyo SP05 Evo	Peugeot 1.6 L I4	262	(France) Frank Lefevre	5
(France) HMC	Funyo SP05 Evo	Peugeot 1.6 L I4	279	(France) Nicolas Cannard	5
(France) HMC	Funyo SP05 Evo	Peugeot 1.6 L I4	279	(France) Eric Soares	5
(France) HMC	Funyo SP05 Evo	Peugeot 1.6 L I4	290	(France) Nicolas Sturm	5
(France) Belt Racing	Funyo SP05 Evo	Peugeot 1.6 L I4	209	(France) Julien Devaux	5
(France) Belt Racing	Funyo SP05 Evo	Peugeot 1.6 L I4	209	(France) Maximilien Menu	5
(France) Belt Racing	Funyo SP05 Evo	Peugeot 1.6 L I4	286	(France) Ethan Bernard	5
(France) Belt Racing	Funyo SP05 Evo	Peugeot 1.6 L I4	286	(France) Sasha Herbrard	5
(Romania) Borlovan Racing	Funyo SP05 Evo	Peugeot 1.6 L I4	216	(Romania) Leo Borlovan	5
(Romania) Borlovan Racing	Funyo SP05 Evo	Peugeot 1.6 L I4	216	(France) Ewen Hachez	5
(France) Yves Orhant	Funyo SP05 Evo	Peugeot 1.6 L I4	235	(France) Yves Orhant	5
(France) AMGV	Funyo SP05 Evo	Peugeot 1.6 L I4	264	(France) Etienne Champetier	5
(France) AMGV	Funyo SP05 Evo	Peugeot 1.6 L I4	283	(France) Dominique Arnoux	5
(France) Uber-Belt Racing	Funyo SP05 Evo	Peugeot 1.6 L I4	269	(France) Olivier Bec	5
(France) Uber-Belt Racing	Funyo SP05 Evo	Peugeot 1.6 L I4	269	(France) Hugo Fleury	5
(France) DAFA Racing	Funyo SP05 Evo	Peugeot 1.6 L I4	277	(France) Jean Christophe Robin	5
(France) DAFA Racing	Funyo SP05 Evo	Peugeot 1.6 L I4	277	(France) Nicolas Robin	5
(France) Pegasus Racing	Funyo SP05 Evo	Peugeot 1.6 L I4	294	(France) Alain Meyer	5
(France) Pegasus Racing	Funyo SP05 Evo	Peugeot 1.6 L I4	294	(France) Jordan Meyer	5
LMP3
(Belgium) Deldiche Racing	Nova Proto NP02	Ford Coyote 5.0 L V8	502	(Romania) Alex Cascatău	5
(Belgium) Deldiche Racing	Nova Proto NP02	Ford Coyote 5.0 L V8	502	(Belgium) Thomas Piessens	5
(Luxembourg) Racing Experience	Duqueine M30 - D08	Nissan VK56DE 5.6 L V8	512	(Luxembourg) Gary Hauser	1–2, 4–6
(Luxembourg) Racing Experience	Duqueine M30 - D08	Nissan VK56DE 5.6 L V8	512	(Luxembourg) Lea Mauer	1–2, 4–6
(Germany) EDEKA Aschoff Racing	Ginetta G58	Ginetta Billet Block 6.2 L V8	521	(Germany) Max Aschoff	3–6
Group CN
(Belgium) Deldiche Racing	Norma M20 FC	Honda K20A 2.0 L I4	611	(Belgium) Sam Dejonghe	1–4, 6
(Belgium) Deldiche Racing	Norma M20 FC	Honda K20A 2.0 L I4	611	(Belgium) Thomas Piessens	1–4, 6
(Belgium) Deldiche Racing	Norma M20 FC	Honda K20A 2.0 L I4	621	(Belgium) Luc de Cock	1–2, 5–6
(Belgium) Deldiche Racing	Norma M20 FC	Honda K20A 2.0 L I4	621	(Belgium) Thomas Piessens	1 (R1)
(Belgium) Deldiche Racing	Norma M20 FC	Honda K20A 2.0 L I4	621	(Belgium) Sam Dejonghe	5
(Switzerland) Haegeli by T2 Racing	Norma M20 FC	Honda K20A 2.0 L I4	612	(Belgium) Oliver Bertels	2, 5
(Switzerland) Haegeli by T2 Racing	Norma M20 FC	Honda K20A 2.0 L I4	612	(Belgium) Cedric Baeten	2
(Switzerland) Haegeli by T2 Racing	Norma M20 FC	Honda K20A 2.0 L I4	612	(Belgium) Chris Matheus	3
(Switzerland) Haegeli by T2 Racing	Norma M20 FC	Honda K20A 2.0 L I4	612	(Italy) Ivan Ruggiero	5
(Belgium) Verheyen Motorsport by T2 Racing	Norma M20 FC	Honda K20A 2.0 L I4	613	(Belgium) Ian Gepts	1–4
(Belgium) Verheyen Motorsport by T2 Racing	Norma M20 FC	Honda K20A 2.0 L I4	613	(Belgium) Brent Verheyen	1–4
(France) BS Racing by Baticonsult	Norma M20 FC	Honda K20A 2.0 L I4	614	(Luxembourg) Alain Berg	3, 6
Radical
(United Kingdom) Revolution Race Cars	Revolution A-One 500SC	Ford 3.7 L V6	704	(Germany) Dominik Dierkes	4
(United Kingdom) Revolution Race Cars	Revolution A-One 500SC	Ford 3.7 L V6	704	(Italy) Antonio La Rosa	4
(Netherlands) Johan Kraan Motorsport	Radical SR1	Suzuki RPE 1.3 L I4	707	(United Kingdom) Jerome Greenhalgh	All
(Netherlands) Johan Kraan Motorsport	Radical SR1	Suzuki RPE 1.3 L I4	707	(United Kingdom) Robin Greenhalgh	All
(Senegal) Domec Racing	Radical SR3	Suzuki RPE 1.5 L I4	750	(Belgium) Martin Lucas	2–3, 5
(Netherlands) MV Motorsport	Radical SR1	Suzuki RPE 1.3 L I4	776	(Netherlands) Melvin van Dam	All
(Netherlands) MV Motorsport	Radical SR1	Suzuki RPE 1.3 L I4	776	(Netherlands) Eddie van Dam	2–3, 5
(Netherlands) MV Motorsport	Radical SR1	Suzuki RPE 1.3 L I4	777	(Netherlands) Eddie van Dam	1
(Netherlands) MV Motorsport	Radical SR3	Suzuki RPE 1.5 L I4	777	(Netherlands) Eddie van Dam	6
(Netherlands) MV Motorsport	Radical SR3	Suzuki RPE 1.5 L I4	777	(Netherlands) Esmee Kosterman	6
(Netherlands) MV Motorsport	Radical SR3	Suzuki RPE 1.5 L I4	777	(Netherlands) Bastiaan van Loenen	6
(United Kingdom) Tim Gray Motosport	Radical SR3	Suzuki RPE 1.5 L I4	786	(United Kingdom) Stephen Bell	3
(United Kingdom) Tim Gray Motosport	Radical SR3	Suzuki RPE 1.5 L I4	786	(United Kingdom) David Watson	3

== Race results ==
Bold indicates overall winner.

Round		Circuit	NC Winning Car	LMP3 Winning Car	Group CN Winning Car	Radical Winning Car
Round		Circuit	NC Winning Drivers	LMP3 Winning Drivers	Group CN Winning Drivers	Radical Winning Drivers
NC	R1	(Netherlands) Zandvoort	**(Monaco) No. 11 Costa Racing**	Did not participate		
NC	R1	(Netherlands) Zandvoort	**(Monaco) Alain Costa**	Did not participate		
NC	R2	(Netherlands) Zandvoort	**(United Kingdom) No. 500 Revolution Race Cars**	Did not participate		
NC	R2	(Netherlands) Zandvoort	**(United Kingdom) Richard Morris**	Did not participate		
1	R1	(Germany) Hockenheimring	Did not participate	(Luxembourg) No. 512 Racing Experience	**(Belgium) No. 613 Verheyen Motorsport by T2 Racing**	(Netherlands) No. 776 MV Motorsport
1	R1	(Germany) Hockenheimring	Did not participate	(Luxembourg) Gary Hauser (Luxembourg) Lea Mauer	**(Belgium) Ian Gepts** **(Belgium) Brent Verheyen**	(Netherlands) Melvin van Dam
1	R2	(Germany) Hockenheimring	Did not participate	No finishers	**(Belgium) No. 613 Verheyen Motorsport by T2 Racing**	(Netherlands) No. 776 MV Motorsport
1	R2	(Germany) Hockenheimring	Did not participate	No finishers	**(Belgium) Ian Gepts** **(Belgium) Brent Verheyen**	(Netherlands) Melvin van Dam
2	R1	(Belgium) Zolder	Did not participate	(Luxembourg) No. 512 Racing Experience	**(Belgium) No. 611 Deldiche Racing**	(Senegal) No. 750 Domec Racing
2	R1	(Belgium) Zolder	Did not participate	(Luxembourg) Gary Hauser (Luxembourg) Lea Mauer	**(Belgium) Sam Dejonghe** **(Belgium) Thomas Piessens**	(Belgium) Martin Lucas
2	R2	(Belgium) Zolder	Did not participate	(Luxembourg) No. 512 Racing Experience	**(Belgium) No. 611 Deldiche Racing**	(Senegal) No. 750 Domec Racing
2	R2	(Belgium) Zolder	Did not participate	(Luxembourg) Gary Hauser (Luxembourg) Lea Mauer	**(Belgium) Sam Dejonghe** **(Belgium) Thomas Piessens**	(Belgium) Martin Lucas
3	R1	(Belgium) Spa-Francorchamps	(United Kingdom) No. 49 360 Racing	(Germany) No. 521 EDEKA Aschoff Racing	**(Belgium) No. 611 Deldiche Racing**	(Senegal) No. 750 Domec Racing
3	R1	(Belgium) Spa-Francorchamps	(United Kingdom) Cian Shields	(Germany) Max Aschoff	**(Belgium) Sam Dejonghe** **(Belgium) Thomas Piessens**	(Belgium) Martin Lucas
3	R2	(Belgium) Spa-Francorchamps	(United Kingdom) No. 31 Valour Performance Technology	**(Germany) No. 521 EDEKA Aschoff Racing**	(Belgium) No. 613 Verheyen Motorsport by T2 Racing	(Senegal) No. 750 Domec Racing
3	R2	(Belgium) Spa-Francorchamps	(United Kingdom) Michael Clark	**(Germany) Max Aschoff**	(Belgium) Ian Gepts (Belgium) Brent Verheyen	(Belgium) Martin Lucas
4	R1	(Netherlands) Assen	Did not participate	**(Germany) No. 521 EDEKA Aschoff Racing**	(Belgium) No. 611 Deldiche Racing	(United Kingdom) No. 707 Johan Kraan Motorsport
4	R1	(Netherlands) Assen	Did not participate	**(Germany) Max Aschoff**	(Belgium) Sam Dejonghe (Belgium) Thomas Piessens	(United Kingdom) Robin Greenhalgh (United Kingdom) Jerome Greenhalgh
4	R2	(Netherlands) Assen	Did not participate	**(Germany) No. 521 EDEKA Aschoff Racing**	(Belgium) No. 611 Deldiche Racing	(Netherlands) No. 776 MV Motorsport
4	R2	(Netherlands) Assen	Did not participate	**(Germany) Max Aschoff**	(Belgium) Sam Dejonghe (Belgium) Thomas Piessens	(Netherlands) Melvin van Dam
5	R1	(Belgium) Spa-Francorchamps	(France) No. 294 Pegasus Racing	**(Belgium) No. 502 Deldiche Racing**	(Switzerland) No. 612 Haegeli by T2 Racing	(Senegal) No. 750 Domec Racing
5	R1	(Belgium) Spa-Francorchamps	(France) Alain Meyer (France) Jordan Meyer	**(Romania) Alex Cascatău** **(Belgium) Thomas Piessens**	(Belgium) Olivier Bertels (Italy) Ivan Ruggierio	(Belgium) Martin Lucas
5	R2	(Belgium) Spa-Francorchamps	(France) No. 277 DAFA Racing	**(Luxembourg) No. 511 Racing Experience**	(Switzerland) No. 612 Haegeli by T2 Racing	(Senegal) No. 750 Domec Racing
5	R2	(Belgium) Spa-Francorchamps	(France) Jean-Christophe Robin (France) Nicolas Robin	**(Luxembourg) Gary Hauser** **(Luxembourg) Lea Mauer**	(Belgium) Olivier Bertels (Italy) Ivan Ruggierio	(Belgium) Martin Lucas
6	R1	(Netherlands) Assen	Did not participate	(Luxembourg) No. 512 Racing Experience	**(Belgium) No. 611 Deldiche Racing**	(United Kingdom) No. 707 Johan Kraan Motorsport
6	R1	(Netherlands) Assen	Did not participate	(Luxembourg) Gary Hauser (Luxembourg) Lea Mauer	**(Belgium) Sam Dejonghe** **(Belgium) Thomas Piessens**	(United Kingdom) Robin Greenhalgh (United Kingdom) Jerome Greenhalgh
6	R2	(Netherlands) Assen	Did not participate	(Germany) No. 521 EDEKA Aschoff Racing	**(France) No. 614 BS Racing by Baticonsult**	(Netherlands) No. 777 MV Motorsport
6	R2	(Netherlands) Assen	Did not participate	(Germany) Max Aschoff	**(Luxembourg) Alain Berg**	(Netherlands) Esmee Kosterman (Netherlands) Eddie van Dam (Netherlands) Bastiaan van Loenen

=== Championship standings ===
Position	**1st**	**2nd**	**3rd**	**4th**	**5th**	**6th**	**7th**	**8th**	**9th**	**10th**	**11th**	**Pole**
Points	23	20	17	15	13	11	9	7	5	3	1	1

Pos.	Driver	Team	(Germany) HOC		(Belgium) ZOL		(Belgium) SPA		(Netherlands) ASS		(Belgium) SPA		(Netherlands) ASS		Points
LMP3
1	(Luxembourg) Gary Hauser (Luxembourg) Lea Mauer	(Luxembourg) Racing Experience	**6**	Ret	**4**	12			2	Ret	2	1	2	6	177
2	(Germany) Max Aschoff	(Germany) EDEKA Team Aschoff					**3**	1	**1**	1	3	23	**12**	5	172
3	(Romania) Alex Cascatău (Belgium) Thomas Piessens	(Belgium) Deldiche Racing									**1**	22			44
Group CN
1	(Belgium) Thomas Piessens	(Belgium) Deldiche Racing	**5**	7	**1**	1	**1**	3	**3**	2			**1**	2	223
1	(Belgium) Sam Dejonghe	(Belgium) Deldiche Racing	**DNS**	7	**1**	1	**1**	3	**DNS**	2	**25**	3	**1**	2	223
2	(Belgium) Ian Gepts (Belgium) Brent Verheyen	(Belgium) Verheyen Motorsport by T2 Racing	1	1	2	Ret	2	2	WD	WD					109
3	(Belgium) Luc de Cock	(Belgium) Deldiche Racing	5	8	17	DNS					**25**	3	Ret	Ret	96
4	(Belgium) Oliver Bertels	(Switzerland) Haegeli by T2 Racing			3	5					17	2			83
5	(Italy) Ivan Ruggiero	(Switzerland) Haegeli by T2 Racing									17	2			46
6	(Belgium) Cedric Baeten	(Switzerland) Haegeli by T2 Racing			3	5									37
7	(Luxembourg) Alain Berg	(France) BS Racing by Baticonsult					DNS	DNS					Ret	1	23
	(Belgium) Chris Matheus	(Switzerland) Haegeli by T2 Racing					DNS	DNS							0
Radical
1	(Netherlands) Melvin van Dam	(Netherlands) MV Motorsport	**11**	10	15	16	30	Ret	**Ret**	9	23	12	**16**	Ret	183
2	(United Kingdom) Robin Greenhalgh (United Kingdom) Jerome Greenhalgh	(Netherlands) Johan Kraan Motorsport	12	Ret	Ret	10	DNS	30	15	Ret	19	18	15	22	163
3	(Belgium) Martin Lucas	(Senegal) Domec Racing			**10**	8	**15**	17			**10**	8			141
4	(Netherlands) Eddie van Dam	(Netherlands) MV Motorsport	Ret	Ret	15	16	30	Ret			23	12	19	18	131
5	(Netherlands) Esmee Kosterman (Netherlands) Bastiaan van Loenen	(Netherlands) MV Motorsport											19	18	40
6	(United Kingdom) Stephen Bell (United Kingdom) David Watson	(United Kingdom) Tim Gray Motorsport					19	40							37
	(Germany) Dominik Dierkes (Italy) Antonio La Rosa	(United Kingdom) Revolution Race Cars							Ret	DNS					0
Non-championship entries
	(France) Jean Christophe Robin (France) Nicolas Robin	(France) DAFA Racing									5	4			
	(United Kingdom) Michael Clark	(United Kingdom) Valour Performance Technology					**7**	4							
	(France) Alain Meyer (France) Jordan Meyer	(France) Pegasus Racing									4	Ret			
	(France) Olivier Bec (France) Hugo Fluery	(France) Uber-Belt Racing									7	5			
	(Italy) Marco Cenetti (Switzerland) Marcello Marrateotto	(Switzerland) Race Performance					10	5							
	(United Kingdom) Cian Shields	(United Kingdom) 360 Racing					6	8							
	(France) Nicolas Cannard (France) Eric Soares	(France) HMC									16	6			
	(Romania) Leo Borlovan (France) Ewen Hachez	(Romania) Borlovan Racing									6	20			
	(France) Ethan Bernard (France) Sasha Herbrard	(France) Belt Racing									**13**	7			
	(United States) James Booth	(United Kingdom) Valour Performance Technology					17	7							
	(France) Yves Orhant	(France) Yves Orhant									8	16			
	(France) Remy Brouard (France) Frank Lefevre	(France) HMC									12	9			
	(France) Julien Devaux (France) Maximilien Menu	(France) Belt Racing									9	17			
	(France) Etienne Champetier	(France) AMGV									18	10			
	(United States) David Morales (United Kingdom) Matthew Rees	(United Kingdom) Valour Performance Technology					42	10							
	(France) Jean-Claude Rolland	(France) HMC									15	11			
	(France) Nicolas Sturm	(France) HMC									11	Ret			
	(United Kingdom) Andy Cummings (United Kingdom) Bradley Ellis	(United Kingdom) Breakell Racing					16	12							
	(United States) Ron Fletcher	(United Kingdom) Revolution Race Cars					13	18							
	(France) Eric Mary (France) Sebastien Viale	(France) HMC									21	13			
	(Singapore) Tang Tien Foo Roy	(South Korea) URO Motorsports					18	14							
	(France) Xavier Cousin	(France) HMC									20	14			
	(France) Bruno Fretin	(France) HMC									14	DNS			
	(United Kingdom) Chris Hoy	(United Kingdom) Revolution Race Cars					14	Ret							
	(France) Ridel Benoit Stekr (France) Guillaume Yaouanc	(France) HMC									26	15			
	(Monaco) Alain Costa	(Monaco) Costa Racing					Ret	16							
	(France) Franck Artuit (France) Julien Charitour	(France) HMC									24	19			
	(Luxembourg) Pierre Schroeder	(United Kingdom) Revolution Race Cars					20	23							
	(France) Dominique Arnoux	(France) AMGV									22	21			
	(Singapore) Goh Eng Peng (South Korea) Kim Hyunjun	(South Korea) URO Motorsports					Ret	34							
	(South Korea) Rho Seung Min (South Korea) Yu Changwook	(South Korea) URO Motorsports					Ret	Ret							
	(United States) Gregg Gorski	(United Kingdom) Revolution Race Cars					Ret	DNS							
	(United Kingdom) Richard Morris	(United Kingdom) Revolution Race Cars					DNS	DNS							
Pos.	Driver	Team	(Germany) HOC		(Belgium) ZOL		(Belgium) SPA		(Netherlands) ASS		(Belgium) SPA		(Netherlands) ASS		Points

Key
Colour	Result
Gold	Winner
Silver	Second place
Bronze	Third place
Green	Other points position
Blue	Other classified position
Blue	Not classified, finished (NC)
Purple	Not classified, retired (Ret)
Red	Did not qualify (DNQ)
Red	Did not pre-qualify (DNPQ)
Black	Disqualified (DSQ)
White	Did not start (DNS)
White	Race cancelled (C)
Blank	Did not practice (DNP)
Blank	Excluded (EX)
Blank	Did not arrive (DNA)
Blank	Withdrawn (WD)
Blank	Did not enter (cell empty)
Text formatting	Meaning
**Bold**	Pole position
Italics	Fastest lap
