= 2015 Supercar Challenge =

Car racing competition

Seasons
- ← 2014 2016 →

The 2015 Supercar Challenge powered by Pirelli was the fifteenth Supercar Challenge season since it replaced the Supercar Cup in 2001. It began at Circuit Park Zandvoort on April 3 and ended at TT Circuit Assen on October 18. Roger Grouwels, Arjan van der Zwaan and Robert de Graaff entered the season as the defending Drivers' Champions in the highest class, the Super GT.

== Calendar ==
Round	Circuit	Date	Classes	Event	Notes
1	Circuit Park Zandvoort, Netherlands	3–4 and 6 April	Supersport / Sport; Superlights 1 / 2	Paasraces	The Sport and Superlights classes have separate races.
2	Circuit Zolder, Belgium	9–10 May	All	New Race Festival	The GT classes, the Sport and Superlights classes have separate races.
3	Circuit de Spa-Francorchamps, Belgium	5–7 June	Super GT / GTB; Supersport / Sport	Spa Euro Races	All of the present classes race combined.
4	Circuit Zolder, Belgium	19–21 June	All	Syntix Superprix	The GT classes, the Sport and Superlights classes have separate races.
5	Circuit Park Zandvoort, Netherlands	10–12 July	Super GT / GTB	Deutsche Tourenwagen Masters	Only the GT classes are present in this weekend.
6	TT Circuit Assen, Netherlands	31 July–2 August	Super GT / GTB; Supersport / Sport	Gamma Racing Day	The GT and Sport classes have separate races.
7	(United Kingdom) Brands Hatch, Great Britain	11–13 September	Super GT / GTB; Supersport / Sport	Supercar Challenge on Tour	The GT and Sport classes have separate races.
8	Circuit de Spa-Francorchamps, Belgium	2–4 October	All	Racing Festival Spa	The GT and Sport classes race combined, but the Superlights classes have separate races.
9	TT Circuit Assen, Netherlands	16–18 October	All	Formido Finaleraces	The GT, Sport and Superlights classes have separate races.

== Entry list ==
=== Super GT/GTB ===
Team	Car	No.	Drivers	Class	Rounds
(Netherlands) Team RaceArt	Dodge Viper GT3-R	101	(Netherlands) Roger Grouwels	SGT	All
(Netherlands) Team RaceArt	Dodge Viper GT3-R	101	(Netherlands) Kelvin Snoeks	SGT	3, 5, 7–9
(Netherlands) Day-V-Tec (Note: Car No. 102 entered as Volvo Reede Racing by Day-V-Tec.)	Volvo S60 V8	102	(Netherlands) Henry Zumbrink	SGT	All
(Netherlands) Day-V-Tec	Volvo S60 V8	106	(Netherlands) Max Koebolt	SGT	2–3, 5–9 (Note: Wesley Caransa crashed in FP1 during the Formido Finaleraces (Round 9), which caused the team to withdraw their No. 106 Volvo S60 V8. Caransa did not drive that weekend, but teammate Max Koebolt drove as a guest driver in a spare Corvette Z06 GT4 in the GTB class.)
(Netherlands) Day-V-Tec	Volvo S60 V8	106	(Netherlands) Pol Stoffel	SGT	3–6
(Netherlands) Day-V-Tec	Volvo S60 V8	106	(Netherlands) Wesley Caransa	SGT	7–9
(Netherlands) Day-V-Tec	Corvette Z06 GT4	305	(Netherlands) Milan Dontje	GTB	All
(Netherlands) Day-V-Tec	Corvette Z06 GT4	305	(Netherlands) Ferdinand Kool	GTB	All
(Netherlands) Day-V-Tec	Corvette Z06 GT4	306	(Netherlands) Max Koebolt	GTB	9
(Italy) Martino Rosso Racing (Note: Car No. 158 entered as Curbstone Events.)	Ferrari 458 Italia GT2	108	(Netherlands) Martin Lanting	SGT	3
(Italy) Martino Rosso Racing	Ferrari 458 Italia GT3	158	(Belgium) Patrick Van Glabeke	SGT	3
(Italy) Martino Rosso Racing	Ferrari 458 Italia GT3	178	(Belgium) Louis-Philippe Soenen	SGT	3
(Belgium) Shipex SRT Racing	Corvette ZR1 GT2	110	(Belgium) Nicolas Vandierendonck	SGT	All
(Belgium) Shipex SRT Racing	Corvette ZR1 GT2	110	(Belgium) Jeffrey van Hooydonk	SGT	2–6, 8–9
(Belgium) Shipex SRT Racing	Corvette ZR1 GT2	110	(United Kingdom) Archie Hamilton	SGT	7
(Belgium) Radical Benelux	Radical RXC 2.7 V8	111	(Netherlands) Henk Thuis	SGT	2–3, 5–7
(Belgium) Radical Benelux	Vicora V8	111	(Netherlands) Henk Thuis	SGT	9
(Belgium) Radical Benelux	Radical RXC Turbo	324	(Netherlands) Roelant de Waard	GTB	2–3
(Netherlands) Cor Euser Racing	Marcos MarcoRelly GT	112	(Netherlands) Cor Euser	SGT	9
(Netherlands) Cor Euser Racing	Marcos MarcoRelly GTS	322	(Netherlands) Cor Euser	GTB	2
(Netherlands) Divitec Racing	Phantom SF11	121	(Netherlands) Nol Köhler	SGT	2–3, 5–6, 8–9
(Netherlands) Divitec Racing	Phantom SF11	121	(Netherlands) Carlo Kuijer	SGT	2–3, 5–6, 8–9
(Netherlands) Divitec Racing	Praga R1	170	(Netherlands) Niels Bouwhuis	SGT	5
(Netherlands) Storm-Tag Point Motorsport	BMW Z4 GT3	131	(Netherlands) Niels Bouwhuis	SGT	3, 8
(Netherlands) Storm-Tag Point Motorsport	BMW Z4 GT3	131	(Netherlands) Jan Storm	SGT	3, 8
(Netherlands) V8 Racing	Mercedes-Benz SLS AMG GT3	133	(Netherlands) Bob Sijthoff	SGT	2
(Netherlands) V8 Racing	Mercedes-Benz SLS AMG GT3	133	(Netherlands) Diederik Sijthoff	SGT	2
(United Kingdom) ING Sport	BMW Z4 GT3	134	(United Kingdom) Kevin Clarke	SGT	7
(United Kingdom) Radical UK	Radical RXC V6 Turbo	141	(United Kingdom) James Abbott	SGT	7
(Netherlands) Kox Racing	McLaren 650S GT3	161	(Netherlands) Peter Kox	SGT	9
(Netherlands) Kox Racing	McLaren 650S GT3	161	(Netherlands) Nico Pronk	SGT	9
(United Kingdom) KRM Staffs Racing	Mosler MT900R GT3	170	(United Kingdom) Kevin Riley	SGT	7
(Luxembourg) Prime Racing	Ginetta-Juno LMP3	171	(Luxembourg) Jerome Naveaux	SGT	4, 6, 8
(Luxembourg) Prime Racing	Ginetta-Juno LMP3	171	(Luxembourg) Jean-Pierre Lequeux	SGT	4, 8
(Luxembourg) Prime Racing	Ginetta-Juno LMP3	171	(Luxembourg) Jean-Marc Ueberecken	SGT	4, 8
(Netherlands) BlueBerry Racing	Mosler MT900R GT3	173	(Netherlands) Berry van Elk	SGT	All
(Netherlands) BlueBerry Racing	BMW M3 E46	344	(Netherlands) Ronald van Loon	GTB	5
(Spain) Neil Garner Motorsport	Mosler MT900R GT3	174	(Spain) Manuel Cintrano	SGT	2–3, 5, 8
(Spain) Neil Garner Motorsport	Mosler MT900R GT3	174	(Spain) Javier Morcillo	SGT	2–3, 5, 8
(Belgium) Prospeed Competition	Porsche 996 GT3 RS	176	(Belgium) Marc Goossens	SGT	2
(Belgium) Prospeed Competition	Porsche 996 GT3 RS	176	(Belgium) Rudi Penders	SGT	2
(Austria) Reiter Engineering	Lamborghini Gallardo R-EX	181	(Czech Republic) Tomáš Enge	SGT	8
(Austria) Reiter Engineering	Lamborghini Gallardo R-EX	181	(Australia) Yasser Shahin	SGT	8
(Spain) Monlau Competicion	Renault R.S. 01 GT3	190	(Spain) Jurgen Smet	SGT	3, 6
(Spain) Monlau Competicion	Renault R.S. 01 GT3	190	(Spain) José Manuel Pérez-Aicart	SGT	3
No team name	TVR Sagaris	191	(United Kingdom) Dean Cook	SGT	7
No team name	TVR Sagaris	191	(United Kingdom) Darren Dowling	SGT	7
(United Kingdom) Colin White	Ginetta G55 GT3	192	(United Kingdom) Colin White	SGT	7
(Germany) Georg Nolte Racing	Matech Ford GT GT3	195	(Germany) Georg Nolte	SGT	6
(Netherlands) Van Berlo Racing	Porsche 997 GT3 Cup	302	(Netherlands) Marcel van Berlo	GTB	2–3, 5–6, 8
(Netherlands) Lammertink Racing	Porsche 997 GT3 Cup	304	(Netherlands) Erol Ertan	GTB	2
(Netherlands) Lammertink Racing	Porsche 997 GT3 Cup	304	(Netherlands) René Wijnen	GTB	2
(Netherlands) Lammertink Racing	Porsche 997 GT3 Cup	343	(Netherlands) Daan Meijer	GTB	3, 5–6, 8
(Netherlands) Topper Team	Porsche 997 GT3 Cup	309	(Netherlands) Dirk Schulz	GTB	3–8
(Belgium) GHK Racing (Speedlover)	Porsche 911 Cup	312	(Belgium) Hans Verhelst	GTB	2, 4–6, 8
(Belgium) GHK Racing (Speedlover)	Porsche 911 Cup	312	(Belgium) Guy Verheyen	GTB	2, 4–6, 8
(Belgium) Vandereyt Racing	Porsche 997 GT3 Cup	315	(Belgium) Miguel Vandereyt	GTB	2–4
(Netherlands) Rapide Racing	Mercedes C63 AMG	323	(Netherlands) Bob Herber	GTB	2–3, 6
(Netherlands) Rapide Racing	BMW M4 Silhouette	376	(Netherlands) Bob Herber	GTB	5
(France) First Motorsport	Porsche 997 GT3 Cup	328	(France) Pierre-Etienne Bordet	GTB	5
(Netherlands) Backdraft Motorsport	Lamborghini Gallardo GT3	334	(United Kingdom) Simon Atkinson	GTB	2–6
(Netherlands) Backdraft Motorsport	Dodge Viper SRT-10 GT3	336	(United Kingdom) Simon Atkinson	GTB	7–8
(United Kingdom) In2Racing	Porsche 991 Cup	335	(United Kingdom) Nick Staveley	GTB	5
(United Kingdom) In2Racing	Porsche 991 Cup	337	(United Kingdom) Tom Bradshaw	GTB	7
(United Kingdom) In2Racing	Porsche 991 Cup	337	(United Kingdom) Daniel McKay	GTB	7
(United Kingdom) Intersport Racing	Porsche 997 GT3 Cup	350	(United Kingdom) Ian Donaldson	GTB	3, 7, 8
(United Kingdom) Intersport Racing	Porsche 997 GT3 Cup	350	(United Kingdom) Mark Donaldson	GTB	3
(United Kingdom) Intersport Racing	Porsche 997 GT3 Cup	350	(United Kingdom) Kevin Clarke	GTB	8
(United Kingdom) Intersport Racing	Lamborghini Gallardo GT3	351	(United Kingdom) Adam Hayes	GTB	3, 8
(United Kingdom) Intersport Racing	Lamborghini Gallardo GT3	351	(United Kingdom) Fiona James	GTB	3
(United Kingdom) Intersport Racing	Lamborghini Gallardo GT3	351	(United Kingdom) Ryan Lindsay	GTB	8
(Netherlands) ABW Racing	Porsche 997 GT3 Cup	369	(Netherlands) Aart Bosman	GTB	3–4, 7–9
(Netherlands) JR Motorsport	BMW M4 Silhouette	375	(Belgium) Ward Sluys	GTB	All
(Netherlands) JR Motorsport	BMW M4 Silhouette	375	(Belgium) Frédérique Jonckheere	GTB	2–6
(Netherlands) JR Motorsport	BMW M4 Silhouette	376	(Netherlands) Bob Herber	GTB	7
(Netherlands) Olij Racing	BMW M3 E92	377	(Netherlands) Ruud Olij	GTB	5
MARC Cars Australia	MARC Mazda 3 GTC	390	(Australia) Jake Camilleri	GTB	3
MARC Cars Australia	MARC Focus GTC	391	(Papua New Guinea) Keith Kassulke	GTB	3
(Belgium) Euroseal/EMG Motorsport	Porsche 997 GT3 Cup	399	(Belgium) Patrick Lamster	GTB	All
(Belgium) Euroseal/EMG Motorsport	Porsche 997 GT3 Cup	399	(Belgium) Kris Cools	GTB	2–4
(Belgium) Euroseal/EMG Motorsport	Porsche 997 GT3 Cup	399	(Netherlands) Donald Molenaar	GTB	5–9

Icon	Class
SGT	Super GT
GTB	GTB

=== Supersport/Sport ===
Team	Car	No.	Drivers	Class	Rounds
(Netherlands) JR Motorsport (Note: Car No. 402 entered as European Staffing by JR Motorsport.)	BMW M3 E90 WTCC	402	(Netherlands) Koen Bogaerts	SS	All
(Netherlands) JR Motorsport	BMW M3 E90 WTCC	402	(Netherlands) Mark van der Aa	SS	1–2, 6, 8
(Netherlands) JR Motorsport	BMW M3 E90 WTCC	402	(Netherlands) Pieter van Soelen	SS	3–4, 7, 9
(Netherlands) JR Motorsport	BMW 132 GTR	403	(Netherlands) Marth de Graaf	SS	All
(Netherlands) JR Motorsport	BMW 132 GTR	403	(Netherlands) Dennis de Groot	SS	All
(Netherlands) JR Motorsport	BMW M3 E92	408	(Netherlands) Ted van Vliet	SS	1, 3–4, 7, 9
(Netherlands) JR Motorsport	BMW M3 E46 GTR	416	(Netherlands) Michael Verhagen	SS	6–7
(Netherlands) JR Motorsport	BMW M3 E46 GTR	416	(Netherlands) Fred Cavanagh	SS	7
(Netherlands) JR Motorsport	BMW M3 E46 Coupé	424	(Netherlands) Nico van Vliet	SS	9
(Netherlands) JR Motorsport	BMW M3 E46 GTR	435	(Netherlands) Daan Meijer	SS	1, 6
(Netherlands) JR Motorsport	BMW M3 E46 GTR	438	(Belgium) Rik Renmans	SS	3
(Netherlands) JR Motorsport	BMW 3 Series Compact E46	511	(Netherlands) Laurens Gooshouwer	S	7
(Netherlands) Stichting Euro Autosport	BMW M3 E92	404	(Netherlands) Ruud Olij	SS	1, 6–7, 9
(Belgium) Deldiche Racing	Lotus 2/11 GT4	405	(Belgium) Luc de Cock	SS	8
(Belgium) Deldiche Racing	Lotus 2/11 GT4	405	(Belgium) Sam Dejonghe	SS	8
(Belgium) DVB Racing	KTM X-Bow GT4	409	(Belgium) Xavier Mezquita	SS	2–3, 7
(Belgium) DVB Racing	KTM X-Bow GT4	409	(Belgium) Reiner Weishaupt	SS	2–3, 7
(Netherlands) Munckhof Racing/Van De Pas Racing	BMW Z4 E86	412	(Netherlands) Eric van den Munckhof	SS	All
(Netherlands) IDRT/Bas Koeten Racing	Saker RapX	415	(Netherlands) Rik van Beek	SS	4, 6, 9
(Luxembourg) FEBO Racing Team	SEAT León Cup Racer	420	(Netherlands) Dennis de Borst	SS	All
(Luxembourg) FEBO Racing Team	SEAT León Cup Racer	420	(Netherlands) Martin de Kleijn	SS	All
(Belgium) Comparexracing	BMW M3 E90 WTCC	421	(Belgium) Steve van Bellingen	SS	1–4
(Belgium) Comparexracing	BMW M3 E90 WTCC	421	(Belgium) Eric Qvick	SS	1–2
(Belgium) Comparexracing	BMW M3 E90 WTCC	421	(United Kingdom) J.K. Norris	SS	3–4
(Belgium) EMG Motorsport	BMW M3 E90 WTCC	421	(Belgium) Steve van Bellingen	SS	8
(Belgium) EMG Motorsport	BMW M3 E90 WTCC	421	(Belgium) Tom van Rompuy	SS	8
(Belgium) EMG Motorsport	BMW M3 E92	446	(Belgium) Philippe Bonneel	SS	1–4, 6–7
(Belgium) EMG Motorsport	BMW M3 E92	446	(Belgium) Bart van Haeren	SS	1
(Belgium) EMG Motorsport	BMW M3 E92	446	(Netherlands) Bas Schouten	SS	2–3, 6–7, 9
(Belgium) EMG Motorsport	BMW M3 E92	446	(Belgium) Eric Bruynoghe	SS	4
(Belgium) EMG Motorsport	BMW M3 E92	446	(Netherlands) Huub Delnoij	SS	9
(Belgium) EMG Motorsport	Renault_Clio#Third_generation_(X85;_2005)	546	(Belgium) Wiebe Wijtzes	S	All
(Netherlands) Ferry Monster Autosport	SEAT León Cup Racer	422	(Netherlands) Dennis Houweling	SS	All
(Netherlands) Ferry Monster Autosport	SEAT León Cup Racer	422	(Netherlands) Priscilla Speelman	SS	1–4
(Belgium) Spork Racing	SEAT León Supercopa	423	(Belgium) Jimmy Adriaenssens	SS	7
(Belgium) Spork Racing	SEAT León Supercopa	423	(Belgium) Wim Meulders	SS	7
(Netherlands) Meijers Motorsport	BMW M3 E92	428	(Netherlands) Frank Meijers	SS	4
(Netherlands) Meijers Motorsport	BMW M3 E92	428	(Netherlands) Menno Meijers	SS	4
(United Kingdom) Rollcentre Racing	BMW M3 E46 V8	432	(United Kingdom) Richard Neary	SS	3, 7–8
(United Kingdom) Rollcentre Racing	BMW M3 E46 V8	432	(United Kingdom) Martin Short	SS	3, 7–8
(Netherlands) JW Raceservice	Saker RapX	434	(Netherlands) Dimitri de Vos	SS	3
(United Kingdom) West Suffolk Racing	BMW M3 E36	440	(United Kingdom) Matt Seldon	SS	7
(United Kingdom) West Suffolk Racing	BMW M3 E36	440	(United Kingdom) Peter Seldon	SS	7
(United Kingdom) West Suffolk Racing	BMW M3 E36	525	(Australia) Adam Bressington	S	8
(United Kingdom) West Suffolk Racing	BMW M3 E36	525	(United Kingdom) Dave Griffin	S	8
(Netherlands) BlueBerry Racing	BMW M3 E46	444	(Netherlands) Ronald van Loon	SS	All
(Netherlands) Harders Plaza Racing	BMW 132i	445	(Netherlands) Robert van den Berg	SS	1, 3, 9
(Netherlands) Harders Plaza Racing	BMW 132i	445	(Netherlands) Sandra van der Sloot	SS	1, 3
(Netherlands) Harders Plaza Racing	BMW 132i	445	(Netherlands) Priscilla Speelman	SS	9
(Netherlands) Harders Plaza Racing	BMW 130i	510	(Netherlands) Benjamin van den Berg	S	1, 3, 9
(Netherlands) Harders Plaza Racing	BMW 130i	510	(Netherlands) John van der Voort	S	1, 3, 9
(Netherlands) AT Motorsport	Ford Focus Silhouette	451	(Netherlands) Leo Kurstjens	SS	1
(Netherlands) AT Motorsport	ATR3	451	(Netherlands) Leo Kurstjens	SS	2–4
(Netherlands) AT Motorsport	ATR3	451	(Netherlands) Wim Lemmers	SS	3, 9
(Netherlands) AT Motorsport	ATR3	451	(Netherlands) Danny van Dongen	SS	6
(Netherlands) AT Motorsport	ATR3	451	(Netherlands) Leon Rijnbeek	SS	8
(Netherlands) AT Motorsport	ATR3	451	(Netherlands) Michel Schaap	SS	9
(Netherlands) AT Motorsport	Ford Focus Silhouette	513	(Netherlands) Kim Troeijen	S	1–4, 6, 8–9
(United Kingdom) PDS Racing	SEAT León Supercopa	452	(United Kingdom) Michael Smith	SS	8
(United Kingdom) Moss Motorsport	BMW M3 E46	453	(United Kingdom) Mike Moss	SS	3, 7
(United Kingdom) Moss Motorsport	BMW M3 E46	453	(United Kingdom) Kevin Clarke	SS	3
(Netherlands) BS Racing Team	BMW M3 E46 GTR	459	(Netherlands) Marcel van der Maat	SS	1–4, 6, 9
(Netherlands) BS Racing Team	BMW M3 E46 GTR	459	(Netherlands) Peter Scheurs	SS	1–4, 6, 9
(Netherlands) Ciass Racing	BMW M3 E46 GTR	461	(Netherlands) Hans van Beek	SS	1, 6
(Netherlands) Ciass Racing	BMW M3 E46 GTR	461	(Netherlands) Joey van Beek	SS	1, 6
(Netherlands) Van der Kooi Racing	Lotus Exige 250 Cup	470	(Netherlands) Huub Delnoij	SS	1–2, 4
(Netherlands) Van der Kooi Racing	Lotus Exige 250 Cup	470	(Netherlands) Cor Euser	SS	1
(Netherlands) Van der Kooi Racing	Lotus Exige 250 Cup	471	(Netherlands) Jan van der Kooi	SS	All
(Netherlands) Van der Kooi Racing	Lotus Exige 250 Cup	471	(Netherlands) Luuk van Loon	SS	All
(Netherlands) Van der Kooi Racing	Lotus Exige	555	(Netherlands) Carlijn Bergsma	S	All
(Netherlands) Van der Kooi Racing	Lotus Exige	555	(Netherlands) Pieter de Jong	S	1–4, 6, 8–9
(Netherlands) Rapide Racing	Mercedes C63 AMG	476	(Netherlands) Bob Herber	SS	7
(United Kingdom) Krayem Racing	Ginetta G50 GT4	488	(United Kingdom) David Krayem	SS	1–2
(United Kingdom) Krayem Racing	Ginetta G50 GT4	488	(United Kingdom) Benno Scrivens	SS	1–2
(Belgium) G&A Racing	BMW M3 GT4	489	(Belgium) Guino Kenis	SS	8
(Netherlands) Spirit Racing	Renault Clio RS	504	(Netherlands) Rob Nieman	S	All
(Netherlands) Spirit Racing	Renault Clio RS	506	(Netherlands) Frank Bédorf	S	1
(Netherlands) Spirit Racing	Renault Clio RS	507	(Netherlands) Stan van Oord	S	2, 6–7, 9
(Netherlands) Spirit Racing	Renault Clio RS	507	(Netherlands) Frank Bédorf	S	3
(Netherlands) Spirit Racing	Renault Clio RS	507	(Netherlands) Marco Poland	S	3
(Netherlands) Spirit Racing	Renault Clio RS	508	(Netherlands) Marco Poland	S	1–2, 4, 6–7
(Netherlands) Spirit Racing	Renault Clio RS	508	(Netherlands) Toon Rutgers	S	1–2, 4, 6
(Netherlands) Spirit Racing	Renault Clio RS	599	(Netherlands) Frank Bédorf	S	4
(Netherlands) Spirit Racing	Renault Clio RS	599	(Netherlands) Christiaan Frankenhout	S	4
(Netherlands) Traxx Racing	Peugeot RCZ	505	(Belgium) Bart van den Broeck	S	All
(Netherlands) Traxx Racing	Peugeot RCZ	505	(Belgium) Chris Voet	S	All
(Netherlands) Wilbert van de Burg	Alfa Romeo 147 Cup	528	(Netherlands) Wilbert van de Burg	S	9
(Poland) Dreszer Motorsport	BMW M235i Racing	532	(Poland) Maciej Dreszer	S	9
(Poland) Dreszer Motorsport	BMW M235i Racing	532	(Netherlands) Stephane Kox	S	9
(Netherlands) Team Bleekemolen	Renault Clio	537	(Belgium) Stephan Polderman	S	6
(Netherlands) Team Bleekemolen	Renault Clio	537	(Belgium) René Steenmetz	S	6
Day-V-Tec	Renault Clio	545	(Netherlands) Niels Kool	S	7–9

Icon	Class
SS	Supersport
S	Sport

=== Superlights 1/Superlights 2 ===
Team	Car	No.	Drivers	Class	Rounds
(Belgium) Radical Benelux	Radical RXC Spyder	701	(Netherlands) Henk Thuis	SL1	1–2, 4
(Belgium) Radical Benelux	Radical RXC Spyder	701	(Netherlands) Donald Molenaar	SL1	1–2
(Belgium) Radical Benelux	Radical RXC Spyder	701	(Netherlands) Pim van Riet	SL1	4
(Belgium) Radical Benelux	Radical SR8	701	(Netherlands) Henk Thuis	SL1	8
(Belgium) Radical Benelux	Radical SR8	706	(Netherlands) Rob Kamphues	SL1	1, 9
(Belgium) Radical Benelux	Radical SR8	707	(Netherlands) Pim van Riet	SL1	2, 8
(Belgium) Radical Benelux	Radical SR8	707	(Netherlands) Danny Brand	SL1	2
(Belgium) Radical Benelux	Radical SR3 RSX	756	(Netherlands) Wibo Rademaker	SL2	1–2
(Belgium) Radical Benelux	Radical SR3 RSX	756	(Netherlands) Donald Molenaar	SL2	4
(Belgium) Radical Benelux	Radical SR3 RSX	784	(Netherlands) Ko Koppejan	SL2	1, 4, 8–9
(Belgium) Ichiban Racing	Tatuus PY012	702	(Belgium) Glenn Haverhals	SL1	All
(Belgium) Ichiban Racing	Tatuus PY012	702	(Belgium) Tim Joosen	SL1	All
(Belgium) Ichiban Racing	Radical SR3 RS	708	(Belgium) Jacques Derenne	SL2	2
(Netherlands) Bas Koeten Racing	Wolf GB08	704	(Netherlands) Bob Herber	SL1	1
(Netherlands) Bas Koeten Racing	Wolf GB08	704	(Netherlands) Bas Schouten	SL1	1
(Netherlands) Bas Koeten Racing	Wolf GB08	705	(Germany) Yorck Schumacher	SL1	All
(Netherlands) Bas Koeten Racing	Wolf GB08	705	(Netherlands) Joey van Splunteren	SL1	All
(Luxembourg) Prime Racing	Ginetta-Juno LMP3	711	(Luxembourg) Jean-Pierre Lequeux	SL1	4, 8
(Luxembourg) Prime Racing	Ginetta-Juno LMP3	711	(Luxembourg) Jerome Naveaux	SL1	4, 8
(Luxembourg) Prime Racing	Ginetta-Juno LMP3	711	(Luxembourg) Jean-Marc Ueberecken	SL1	4
(Belgium) Deldiche Racing	Norma 20FC	716	(Belgium) Luc de Cock	SL1	All
(Belgium) Deldiche Racing	Norma 20FC	716	(Belgium) Sam Dejonghe	SL1	All
(Germany) Teichmann Radical DE	Radical RXC Spyder	717	(Germany) Ercan Osman	SL1	1
(Germany) Teichmann Radical DE	Radical RXC Spyder	717	(Germany) Michael Teichmann	SL1	1
(United Kingdom) Radical UK	Radical RXC Spyder	718	(United Kingdom) James Abbott	SL1	2
(Germany) Radical Deutschland	Radical SR8	727	(Belgium) "Decourtis"	SL1	8
(Germany) Radical Deutschland	Radical SR8	727	(Germany) Bernd Rosenschon	SL1	8
No team name	Norma 20FC	747	(Belgium) Christophe Burrick	SL1	4
No team name	Norma 20FC	747	(Belgium) Damian Delafosse	SL1	4
No team name	Norma 20FC	747	(Belgium) Jean-Lou Rihon	SL1	4
(Germany) Heinz Kremer Racing	Osella PR21	754	(Germany) Heinz Kremer	SL2	1, 8–9
(Germany) Heinz Kremer Racing	Norma M20F	754	(Germany) Heinz Kremer	SL2	2
(Germany) Heinz Kremer Racing	Norma M20F	794	(Germany) Heinz Kremer	SL2	4
(Belgium) Glasfolie.be	Norma M20F	755	(Belgium) Filip Declercq	SL2	All
(Belgium) Norma Benelux	Norma M20F	760	(Belgium) David Houthoofd	SL2	All
(Belgium) Norma Benelux	Norma M20F	760	(Belgium) Vincent Desschans	SL2	4
(Belgium) Norma Benelux	Norma M20F	760	(Belgium) Philip Vlieghe	SL2	8
(Belgium) Norma Benelux	Norma 1300 Prosport	762	(Belgium) Kenny Boeykens	SL2	9
(Netherlands) BlueBerry Racing	Praga R1	770	(Netherlands) Carlo Kuijer	SL2	1–2, 4
(Netherlands) BlueBerry Racing	Praga R1	771	(Netherlands) Paul Sieljes	SL2	All
(Netherlands) BlueBerry Racing	Praga R1	772	(Netherlands) Robert de Graaff	SL2	9
(Netherlands) BlueBerry Racing	Praga R1	772	(Netherlands) Phillipe Ribbens	SL2	9
(Belgium) M-Racing	Radical SR3SL	780	(Belgium) Wim Jeuris	SL2	All
(Germany) Ingo Lauscher Racing	Radical SR3	781	(Germany) Ingo Lauscher	SL2	1
(Germany) DD-Compound	Radical SR3 RS	786	(Germany) Dominik Dierkes	SL2	1–2, 8–9
(Germany) DD-Compound	Radical SR3 RS	786	(Germany) Hauke Höschler	SL2	1–2, 8–9
(Netherlands) Freebird Motorsport	Radical SR3 RS	787	(Netherlands) Dick Freebird	SL2	4, 9
(Belgium) Domec Racing	Radical Prosport	788	(Belgium) Phillip Daniels	SL2	4
(Netherlands) B&T Racing	Radical SR3 RS	790	(Netherlands) Leon Rijnbeek	SL2	1–2, 4

Icon	Class
SL1	Superlights 1
SL2	Superlights 2

== Race results ==
Round	Circuit	Race	Super GT Winning Car	GTB Winning Car	Supersport Winning Car	Sport Winning Car	Superlights 1 Winning Car	Superlights 2 Winning Car
Round	Circuit	Race	Super GT Winning Drivers	GTB Winning Drivers	Supersport Winning Drivers	Sport Winning Drivers	Superlights 1 Winning Drivers	Superlights 2 Winning Drivers
1	(Netherlands) Zandvoort	1	Did not participate		No. 402 European Staffing by JR Motorsport	No. 508 Spirit Racing	No. 701 Radical Benelux	No. 755 Glasfolie.be
1	(Netherlands) Zandvoort	1	Did not participate		(Netherlands) Mark van der Aa (Netherlands) Koen Bogaerts	(Netherlands) Marco Poland (Netherlands) Toon Rutgers	(Netherlands) Henk Thuis	(Belgium) Filip Declercq
1	(Netherlands) Zandvoort	2	Did not participate		No. 435 JR Motorsport	No. 504 Spirit Racing	No. 705 Bas Koeten Racing	No. 756 Radical Benelux
1	(Netherlands) Zandvoort	2	Did not participate		(Netherlands) Daan Meijer	(Netherlands) Rob Nieman	(Germany) Yorck Schumacher (Netherlands) Joey van Splunteren	(Netherlands) Wibo Rademaker
2	(Belgium) Zolder	1	No. 101 Team RaceArt	No. 375 JR Motorsport	No. 402 European Staffing by JR Motorsport	No. 507 Spirit Racing	No. 716 Deldiche Racing	No. 755 Glasfolie.be
2	(Belgium) Zolder	1	(Netherlands) Roger Grouwels	(Belgium) Fréderique Jonckheere (Belgium) Ward Sluys	(Netherlands) Mark van der Aa (Netherlands) Koen Bogaerts	(Netherlands) Stan van Oord	(Belgium) Luc de Cock (Belgium) Sam Dejonghe	(Belgium) Filip Declercq
2	(Belgium) Zolder	2	No. 102 Volvo Reede Racing by Day-V-Tec	No. 305 Day-V-Tec	No. 412 Munckhof Racing/Van De Pas Racing	No. 546 EMG Motorsport	No. 716 Deldiche Racing	No. 755 Glasfolie.be
2	(Belgium) Zolder	2	(Netherlands) Henry Zumbrink	(Netherlands) Milan Dontje (Netherlands) Ferdinand Kool	(Netherlands) Eric van den Munckhof	(Belgium) Wiebe Wijtzes	(Belgium) Luc de Cock (Belgium) Sam Dejonghe	(Belgium) Filip Declercq
3	(Belgium) Spa-Francorchamps	1	No. 101 Team RaceArt	No. 390 MARC Cars Australia	No. 446 EMG Motorsport	No. 546 EMG Motorsport	Did not participate	
3	(Belgium) Spa-Francorchamps	1	(Netherlands) Roger Grouwels (Netherlands) Kelvin Snoeks	(Australia) Jake Camilleri	(Belgium) Philippe Bonneel (Netherlands) Bas Schouten	(Belgium) Wiebe Wijtzes	Did not participate	
3	(Belgium) Spa-Francorchamps	2	No. 190 Monlau Competicion	No. 334 Backdraft Motorsport	No. 403 JR Motorsport	No. 505 Traxx Racing	Did not participate	
3	(Belgium) Spa-Francorchamps	2	(Spain) José Manuel Pérez-Aicart (Spain) Jurgen Smet	(United Kingdom) Simon Atkinson	(Netherlands) Marth de Graaf (Netherlands) Dennis de Groot	(Belgium) Bart van den Broeck (Belgium) Chris Voet	Did not participate	
4	(Belgium) Zolder	1	No. 102 Volvo Reede Racing by Day-V-Tec	No. 305 Day-V-Tec	No. 412 Munckhof Racing/Van De Pas Racing	No. 546 EMG Motorsport	No. 701 Radical Benelux	No. 755 Glasfolie.be
4	(Belgium) Zolder	1	(Netherlands) Henry Zumbrink	(Netherlands) Milan Dontje (Netherlands) Ferdinand Kool	(Netherlands) Eric van den Munckhof	(Belgium) Wiebe Wijtzes	(Netherlands) Pim van Riet (Netherlands) Henk Thuis	(Belgium) Filip Declercq
4	(Belgium) Zolder	2	No. 110 Shipex SRT Racing	No. 375 JR Motorsport	No. 412 Munckhof Racing/Van De Pas Racing	No. 546 EMG Motorsport	No. 705 Bas Koeten Racing	No. 760 Norma Benelux
4	(Belgium) Zolder	2	(Belgium) Nicolas Vandierendonck (Belgium) Jeffrey van Hooydonk	(Belgium) Fréderique Jonckheere (Belgium) Ward Sluys	(Netherlands) Eric van den Munckhof	(Belgium) Wiebe Wijtzes	(Germany) Yorck Schumacher (Netherlands) Joey van Splunteren	(Belgium) Vincent Desschans (Belgium) David Houthoofd
5	(Netherlands) Zandvoort	1	No. 102 Volvo Reede Racing by Day-V-Tec	No. 375 JR Motorsport	Did not participate			
5	(Netherlands) Zandvoort	1	(Netherlands) Henry Zumbrink	(Belgium) Fréderique Jonckheere (Belgium) Ward Sluys	Did not participate			
5	(Netherlands) Zandvoort	2	No. 102 Volvo Reede Racing by Day-V-Tec	No. 305 Day-V-Tec	Did not participate			
5	(Netherlands) Zandvoort	2	(Netherlands) Henry Zumbrink	(Netherlands) Milan Dontje (Netherlands) Ferdinand Kool	Did not participate			
6	(Netherlands) Assen	1	No. 102 Volvo Reede Racing by Day-V-Tec	No. 305 Day-V-Tec	No. 446 EMG Motorsport	No. 507 Spirit Racing	Did not participate	
6	(Netherlands) Assen	1	(Netherlands) Henry Zumbrink	(Netherlands) Milan Dontje (Netherlands) Ferdinand Kool	(Belgium) Philippe Bonneel (Netherlands) Bas Schouten	(Netherlands) Stan van Oord	Did not participate	
6	(Netherlands) Assen	2	No. 173 BlueBerry Racing	No. 399 Euroseal/EMG Motorsport	No. 404 Stichting Euro Autosport	No. 555 Van der Kooi Racing	Did not participate	
6	(Netherlands) Assen	2	(Netherlands) Berry van Elk	(Belgium) Patrick Lamster (Netherlands) Donald Molenaar	(Netherlands) Ruud Olij	(Netherlands) Carlijn Bergsma (Netherlands) Pieter de Jong	Did not participate	
7	(United Kingdom) Brands Hatch	1	No. 110 Shipex SRT Racing	No. 337 In2Racing	No. 404 Stichting Euro Autosport	No. 546 EMG Motorsport	Did not participate	
7	(United Kingdom) Brands Hatch	1	(United Kingdom) Archie Hamilton (Belgium) Nicolas Vandierendonck	(United Kingdom) Tom Bradshaw (United Kingdom) Daniel McKay	(Netherlands) Ruud Olij	(Belgium) Wiebe Wijtzes	Did not participate	
7	(United Kingdom) Brands Hatch	2	No. 110 Shipex SRT Racing	No. 399 Euroseal/EMG Motorsport	No. 432 Rollcentre Racing	No. 546 EMG Motorsport	Did not participate	
7	(United Kingdom) Brands Hatch	2	(United Kingdom) Archie Hamilton (Belgium) Nicolas Vandierendonck	(Belgium) Patrick Lamster (Netherlands) Donald Molenaar	(United Kingdom) Richard Neary (United Kingdom) Martin Short	(Belgium) Wiebe Wijtzes	Did not participate	
8	(Belgium) Spa-Francorchamps	1	No. 181 Reiter Engineering	No. 305 Day-V-Tec	No. 402 European Staffing by JR Motorsport	No. 555 Van der Kooi Racing	No. 716 Deldiche Racing	No. 754 Heinz Kremer Racing
8	(Belgium) Spa-Francorchamps	1	(Czech Republic) Tomáš Enge (Australia) Yasser Shahin	(Netherlands) Milan Dontje (Netherlands) Ferdinand Kool	(Netherlands) Mark van der Aa (Netherlands) Koen Bogaerts	(Netherlands) Carlijn Bergsma (Netherlands) Pieter de Jong	(Belgium) Luc de Cock (Belgium) Sam Dejonghe	(Germany) Heinz Kremer
8	(Belgium) Spa-Francorchamps	2	No. 181 Reiter Engineering	No. 302 Van Berlo Racing	No. 402 European Staffing by JR Motorsport	No. 505 Traxx Racing	No. 707 Radical Benelux	No. 755 Glasfolie.be
8	(Belgium) Spa-Francorchamps	2	(Czech Republic) Tomáš Enge (Australia) Yasser Shahin	(Netherlands) Marcel van Berlo	(Netherlands) Mark van der Aa (Netherlands) Koen Bogaerts	(Belgium) Bart van den Broeck (Belgium) Chris Voet	(Netherlands) Pim van Riet	(Belgium) Filip Declercq
9	(Netherlands) Assen	1	No. 102 Volvo Reede Racing by Day-V-Tec	No. 375 JR Motorsport	No. 446 EMG Motorsport	No. 507 Spirit Racing	No. 716 Deldiche Racing	No. 755 Glasfolie.be
9	(Netherlands) Assen	1	(Netherlands) Henry Zumbrink	(Belgium) Ward Sluys	(Netherlands) Huub Delnoij (Netherlands) Bas Schouten	(Netherlands) Stan van Oord	(Belgium) Luc de Cock (Belgium) Sam Dejonghe	(Belgium) Filip Declercq
9	(Netherlands) Assen	2	No. 161 Kox Racing	No. 305 Day-V-Tec	No. 471 Van der Kooi Racing	No. 555 Van der Kooi Racing	No. 702 Ichiban Racing	No. 787 Freebird
9	(Netherlands) Assen	2	(Netherlands) Peter Kox (Netherlands) Nico Pronk	(Netherlands) Milan Dontje (Netherlands) Ferdinand Kool	(Netherlands) Jan van der Kooi (Netherlands) Luuk van Loon	(Netherlands) Carlijn Bergsma (Netherlands) Pieter de Jong	(Belgium) Glenn Haverhals (Belgium) Tim Joosen	(Netherlands) Dick Freebird

== Championship standings ==
=== Scoring system ===
Championship points are awarded for the first ten positions in each race. The pole-sitter in Race 1 and Race 2 and the driver with the fastest lap in Race 1 and Race 2 also receive one point. The grid for Race 1 is decided by a normal qualifying, but the grid for Race 2 is decided by everyone's second best time in qualifying. If a guest driver gets Pole Position, the point will go to the best qualified regular driver. If a guest driver has the fastest lap, the point will go to the regular driver with the fastest lap. Entries are required to complete 75% of the winning car's (per division) race distance in order to be classified and earn points. Participants who join less than 4 events (8 races) will be treated as guest drivers and will not be included in the scoring and will not receive any points. All results shall count towards the year-end standings. There are no scratch results. If there are in a division on average less than 6 participants the overall points standing will be reduced with 75%.

==== Super GT/GTB/Supersport/Sport (Race 1 and Race 2) ====
Position	**1st**	**2nd**	**3rd**	**4th**	**5th**	**6th**	**7th**	**8th**	**9th**	**10th**	**Pole**	**FL**
Points	20	18	16	14	12	10	8	6	4	2	1	1

==== Superlights (Race 1) ====
Position	**1st**	**2nd**	**3rd**	**4th**	**5th**	**6th**	**7th**	**8th**	**9th**	**10th**	**Pole**	**FL**
Points	10	9	8	7	6	5	4	3	2	1	1	1

==== Superlights (Race 2) ====
Position	**1st**	**2nd**	**3rd**	**4th**	**5th**	**6th**	**7th**	**8th**	**9th**	**10th**	**Pole**	**FL**
Points	20	18	16	14	12	10	8	6	4	2	1	1

Notes

- At the Racing Festival Spa the scoring system for the Superlights races was reversed, so for Race 1 a maximum of 22 points was available and for Race 2 a maximum of 12 points was available.

=== Drivers' Championship ===
==== Super GT/GTB ====
Pos.	Driver	Team	ZOL (Belgium)		SPA (Belgium)		ZOL (Belgium)		ZAN (Netherlands)		ASS (Netherlands)		BRH (United Kingdom)		SPA (Belgium)		ASS (Netherlands)		Total
Super GT
1	(Netherlands) Roger Grouwels	Team RaceArt	1	Ret	**1**	2	2	2	2	**2**	4	4	**3**	**13**	**3**	**2**	4	5	277
1	(Netherlands) Kelvin Snoeks	Team RaceArt			**1**	2			2	**2**			**3**	**13**	**3**	**2**	4	5	277
2	(Belgium) Nicolas Vandierendonck	Shipex SRT Racing	2	2	3	**4**	**3**	**1**	**3**	15	**2**	**5**	1	1	Ret	4	**3**	**2**	270
2	(Belgium) Jeffrey van Hooydonk	Shipex SRT Racing	2	2	3	**4**	**3**	**1**	**3**	15	**2**	5			Ret	4	**3**	**2**	270
3	(Netherlands) Henry Zumbrink	Volvo Reede Racing by Day-V-Tec	**7**	**1**	Ret	Ret	1	Ret	1	1	1	2	2	15	30	5	1	4	229
4	(Netherlands) Berry van Elk	BlueBerry Racing	3	8	4	3	4	3	15	DNS	3	1	Ret	DNS	DNS	WD	Ret	6	150
5	(Netherlands) Max Koebolt	Day-V-Tec	4	6	26	11			Ret	16	5	6	5	Ret	Ret	3	WD	WD	138
6	(Netherlands) Henk Thuis	Radical Benelux	6	3	10	10			4	Ret	Ret	3	7	7			6	13	134
7	(Netherlands) Nol Köhler	Divitec Racing	11	Ret	Ret	9			6	3	Ret	8			5	18	2	10	114
7	(Netherlands) Carlo Kuijer	Divitec Racing	11	Ret	Ret	9			6	3	Ret	8			5	18	2	10	114
8	(Netherlands) Pol Stoffel	Day-V-Tec			26	11	8	8	Ret	16	5	6							106
9	(Spain) Manuel Cintrano	Neil Garner Motorsport	15	18	7	14			14	8					4	7			92
9	(Spain) Javier Morcillo	Neil Garner Motorsport	15	18	7	14			14	8					4	7			92
Guest drivers ineligible for Super GT points
	(United Kingdom) Archie Hamilton	Shipex SRT Racing											1	1					
	(Czech Republic) Tomáš Enge	Reiter Engineering													1	1			
	(Australia) Yasser Shahin	Reiter Engineering													1	1			
	(Netherlands) Peter Kox	Kox Racing															5	1	
	(Netherlands) Nico Pronk	Kox Racing															5	1	
	(Spain) Jurgen Smet	Monlau Competicion			9	1					11	9							
	(Spain) José Manuel Pérez-Aicart	Monlau Competicion			9	1													
	(United Kingdom) Kevin Clarke	ING Sport											4	2					
	(Netherlands) Niels Bouwhuis	Storm-Tag Point Motorsport			5	8									2	6			
	(Netherlands) Niels Bouwhuis	Divitec Racing							5	4									
	(Netherlands) Jan Storm	Storm-Tag Point Motorsport			5	8									2	6			
	(Netherlands) Martin Lanting	Martino Rosso Racing			2	5													
	(Netherlands) Wesley Caransa	Day-V-Tec											5	Ret	Ret	3	WD	WD	
	(Netherlands) Cor Euser	Cor Euser Racing															7	3	
	(Belgium) Marc Goossens	Prospeed Competition	5	4															
	(Belgium) Rudi Penders	Prospeed Competition	5	4															
	(Belgium) Patrick Van Glabeke	Curbstone Events			6	6													
	(United Kingdom) Colin White	Colin White											6	8					
	(Luxembourg) Jerome Naveaux	Prime Racing					Ret	DNS			10	Ret			6	9			
	(Luxembourg) Jean-Pierre Lequeux	Prime Racing					Ret	DNS							6	9			
	(Luxembourg) Jean-Marc Ueberecken	Prime Racing					Ret	DNS							6	9			
	(United Kingdom) James Abbott	Radical UK											8	Ret					
	(Belgium) Louis-Philippe Soenen	Martino Rosso Racing			8	34													
	(Netherlands) Bob Sijthoff	V8 Racing	9	14															
	(Netherlands) Dietrich Sijthoff	V8 Racing	9	14															
	(United Kingdom) Dean Cook	No team name											15	Ret					
	(United Kingdom) Darren Dowling	No team name											15	Ret					
	(United Kingdom) Kevin Riley	KRM Staffs Racing											Ret	Ret					
	(Germany) Georg Nolte	Georg Nolte									Ret	DNS							
GTB
1	(Belgium) Patrick Lamster	Euroseal/EMG Motorsport	10	**10**	17	**15**	7	7	10	6	8	**7**	12	3	**9**	**12**	**11**	**12**	268
1	(Belgium) Kris Cools	Euroseal/EMG Motorsport	10	**10**	17	**15**	7	7											268
1	(Netherlands) Donald Molenaar	Euroseal/EMG Motorsport							10	6	8	**7**	12	3	**9**	**12**	**11**	**12**	268
2	(Netherlands) Milan Dontje	Day-V-Tec	14	5	12	Ret	**5**	**5**	**Ret**	**5**	**6**	13	13	4	7	10	10	7	260
2	(Netherlands) Ferdinand Kool	Day-V-Tec	14	5	12	Ret	**5**	**5**	**Ret**	**5**	**6**	13	13	4	7	10	10	7	260
3	(Belgium) Ward Sluys	JR Motorsport	8	15	15	29	Ret	4	7	12	7	10	**10**	**10**	Ret	Ret	8	9	213
4	(United Kingdom) Simon Atkinson	Backdraft Motorsport	13	7	29	7	6	6	Ret	10	Ret	11	11	5	8	Ret			171
5	(Belgium) Frédérique Jonckheere	JR Motorsport	8	15	15	29	Ret	4	7	12	7	10							140
6	(Netherlands) Daan Meijer	Lammertink Racing			13	16			12	9	9	14			21	11			110
7	(Netherlands) Marcel van Berlo	Van Berlo Racing	**12**	11	14	Ret			8	11	Ret	Ret			10	8			107
8	(Netherlands) Bob Herber	Rapide Racing	Ret	9	18	Ret			Ret	7	12	12							92
8	(Netherlands) Bob Herber	JR Motorsport											14	9					92
9	(Netherlands) Aart Bosman	ABW Racing			22	Ret	11	9					Ret	12	11	13	12	11	92
10	(Netherlands) Dirk Schulz	Topper Team			Ret	32	12	10	Ret	18	13	16	16	14	16	25			86
11	(Belgium) Hans Verhelst	GHK Racing (Speedlover)	Ret	17			10	11	13	17	14	15			22	Ret			62
11	(Belgium) Guy Verheyen	GHK Racing (Speedlover)	Ret	17			10	11	13	17	14	15			22	Ret			62
12	(Belgium) Miguel Vandereyt	Vandereyt Racing	16	13	25	31	9	Ret											48
13	(Netherlands) Erol Ertan	Lammertink Racing	17	12															18
13	(Netherlands) René Wijnen	Lammertink Racing	17	12															18
14	(Netherlands) Roelant de Waard	Radical Benelux	Ret	16	**16**	Ret													17
Guest drivers ineligible for GTB points
	(Australia) Jake Camilleri	MARC Cars Australia			11	17													
	(United Kingdom) Tom Bradshaw	In2Racing											9	6					
	(United Kingdom) Daniel McKay	In2Racing											9	6					
	(Netherlands) Max Koebolt	Day-V-Tec															9	8	
	(France) Pierre-Etienne Bordet	First Motorsport							9	13									
	(United Kingdom) Ian Donaldson	Intersport Racing			24	21							Ret	11	31	16			
	(United Kingdom) Mark Donaldson	Intersport Racing			24	21													
	(Netherlands) Ronald van Loon	BlueBerry Racing							11	Ret									
	(United Kingdom) Kevin Clarke	Intersport Racing													31	16			
	(United Kingdom) Adam Hayes	Intersport Racing			34	Ret									14	Ret			
	(United Kingdom) Ryan Lindsay	Intersport Racing													14	Ret			
	(Papua New Guinea) Keith Kassulke	MARC Cars Australia			19	30													
	(Netherlands) Ruud Olij	Olij Racing							Ret	14									
	(United Kingdom) Fiona James	Intersport Racing			34	Ret													
	(Netherlands) Cor Euser	Cor Euser Racing	Ret	Ret															
	(United Kingdom) Nick Staveley	In2Racing							WD	WD									

Key
Colour	Result
Gold	Race winner
Silver	2nd place
Bronze	3rd place
Green	Points finish
Blue	Non-points finish
Blue	Non-classified finish (NC)
Purple	Did not finish (Ret)
Black	Disqualified (DSQ)
Black	Excluded (EX)
White	Did not start (DNS)
White	Race cancelled (C)
White	Withdrew (WD)
Blank	Did not participate

**Bold** – Point for Pole
Italics – Point for Fastest Lap

==== Supersport/Sport ====
Pos.	Driver	Team	ZAN (Netherlands)		ZOL (Belgium)		SPA (Belgium)		ZOL (Belgium)		ASS (Netherlands)		BRH (United Kingdom)		SPA (Belgium)		ASS (Netherlands)		Total
Supersport
1	(Netherlands) Koen Bogaerts	European Staffing by JR Motorsport	1	2	1	2	**27**	25	2	2	**4**	**6**	**5**	**4**	**12**	**14**	5	5	282
1	(Netherlands) Mark van der Aa	European Staffing by JR Motorsport	1	2	1	2					**4**	**6**			**12**	**14**			282
1	(Netherlands) Pieter van Soelen	European Staffing by JR Motorsport					**27**	25	2	2			**5**	**4**			5	5	282
2	(Netherlands) Eric van den Munckhof	Munckhof Racing/Van De Pas Racing	2	4	2	1	32	20	**1**	**1**	9	8	13	2	19	17	6	12	224
3	(Netherlands) Marth de Graaf	JR Motorsport	12	3	3	**5**	28	12	5	3	5	2	21	3	Ret	15	9	4	201
3	(Netherlands) Dennis de Groot	JR Motorsport	12	3	3	**5**	28	12	5	3	5	2	21	3	Ret	15	9	4	201
4	(Netherlands) Jan van der Kooi	Van der Kooi Racing	8	11	15	8	23	22	Ret	DSQ	17	3	6	5	13	20	**3**	**1**	160
4	(Netherlands) Luuk van Loon	Van der Kooi Racing	8	11	15	8	23	22	Ret	DSQ	17	3	6	5	13	20	**3**	**1**	160
5	(Netherlands) Dennis Houweling	Ferry Monster Autosport	10	5	6	9	35	28	8	8	10	11	7	9	17	21	7	8	126
6	(Netherlands) Dennis de Borst	FEBO Racing Team	16	10	7	7	36	13	9	7	11	9	19	8	Ret	19	4	7	125
6	(Netherlands) Martin de Kleijn	FEBO Racing Team	16	10	7	7	36	13	9	7	11	9	19	8	Ret	19	4	7	125
7	(Belgium) Philippe Bonneel	EMG Motorsport	6	8	**Ret**	DNS	20	**24**	17	9	1	4	4	11					113
8	(Belgium) Steve van Bellingen	Comparexracing	5	6	5	3	30	36	4	6									112
8	(Belgium) Steve van Bellingen	EMG Motorsport													15	24			112
9	(Netherlands) Bas Schouten	EMG Motorsport			**Ret**	DNS	20	**24**			1	4	4	11			1	Ret	109
10	(Netherlands) Marcel van der Maat	BS Racing Team	7	7	4	16	Ret	19	3	4	7	Ret					11	19	98
10	(Netherlands) Peter Scheurs	BS Racing Team	7	7	4	16	Ret	19	3	4	7	Ret					11	19	98
11	(Netherlands) Ronald van Loon	BlueBerry Racing	11	Ret	8	6	Ret	27	6	5	8	16	8	10	18	23	Ret	20	94
12	(Netherlands) Ruud Olij	Stichting Euro Autosport	Ret	12							Ret	1	1	6			2	3	89
13	(Netherlands) Priscilla Speelman	Ferry Monster Autosport	10	5	6	9	35	28	8	8									52
13	(Netherlands) Priscilla Speelman	Harders Plaza Racing															8^{2}	9^{2}	52
14	(Netherlands) Huub Delnoij	Van der Kooi Racing	**3**	**22**	Ret	10			Ret	Ret									41
14	(Netherlands) Huub Delnoij	EMG Motorsport															1	Ret	41
15	(Belgium) Xavier Mezquita	DVB Racing			9	4	37	23					9^{1}	16^{1}					30
15	(Belgium) Reiner Weishaupt	DVB Racing			9	4	37	23					9^{1}	16^{1}					30
16	(Netherlands) Robert van den Berg	Harders Plaza Racing	Ret	23			31	26									8	9	28
16	(Netherlands) Sandra van der Sloot	Harders Plaza Racing	Ret	23			31	26											28
17	(Netherlands) Ted van Vliet	JR Motorsport	14	9			38	33	15	18			12	Ret			12	13	22
18	(United Kingdom) David Krayem	Krayem Racing	9	Ret	12	15													8
18	(United Kingdom) Benno Scrivens	Krayem Racing	9	Ret	12	15													8
19	(Netherlands) Leo Kurstjens	AT Motorsport	21	20	17	Ret	44	Ret	Ret	16									2
Guest drivers ineligible for Supersport points
	(United Kingdom) Richard Neary	Rollcontre Racing					21	18					20	1	Ret	22			
	(United Kingdom) Martin Short	Rollcontre Racing					21	18					20	1	Ret	22			
	(Netherlands) Daan Meijer	JR Motorsport	4	1							3	10							
	(Netherlands) Michael Verhagen	JR Motorsport									2	5	3	7					
	(Netherlands) Rik van Beek	IDRT/Bas Koeten Racing							7	10	6	7					Ret	2	
	(Netherlands) Bob Herber	Rapide Racing											2	Ret					
	(Belgium) Eric Qvick	Comparexracing	5	6	5	3													
	(Netherlands) Fred Cavanagh	JR Motorsport											3	7					
	(Belgium) Tom van Rompuy	EMG Motorsport													15	24			
	(Netherlands) Cor Euser	Van der Kooi Racing	3	22															
	(United Kingdom) J.K. Norris	Comparexracing					30	36	4	6									
	(Belgium) Bart van Haeren	EMG Motorsport	6	8															
	(Netherlands) Nico van Vliet	JR Motorsport															Ret	6	
	(United Kingdom) Michael Smith	PDS Racing													20	32			
	(Belgium) Rik Renmans	JR Motorsport					33	35											
	(Belgium) Eric Bruynoghe	EMG Motorsport							17	9									
	(Netherlands) Wim Lemmers	AT Motorsport					44	Ret									10	Ret	
	(Netherlands) Michel Schaap	AT Motorsport															10	Ret	
	(Belgium) Luc de Cock	Deldiche Racing													Ret	26			
	(Belgium) Sam Dejonghe	Deldiche Racing													Ret	26			
	(United Kingdom) Mike Moss	Moss Motorsport					DNS	WD					10	DNS					
	(Belgium) Jimmy Adriaenssens	Spork Racing											11	12					
	(Belgium) Wim Meulders	Spork Racing											11	12					
	(Netherlands) Frank Meijers	Meijers Motorsport							Ret	11									
	(Netherlands) Menno Meijers	Meijers Motorsport							Ret	11									
	(Netherlands) Hans van Beek	Ciass Racing	18	13							Ret	17							
	(Netherlands) Joey van Beek	Ciass Racing	18	13							Ret	17							
	(United Kingdom) Matt Seldon	West Suffolk Racing											Ret	Ret					
	(United Kingdom) Peter Seldon	West Suffolk Racing											Ret	Ret					
	(Belgium) Guino Kenis	G&A Racing													Ret	DNS			
	(United Kingdom) Kevin Clarke	Moss Motorsport					DNS	WD											
	(Netherlands) Leon Rijnbeek	AT Motorsport													DNS	WD			
	(Netherlands) Dimitri de Vos	JW Raceservice					WD	WD											
	(Netherlands) Danny van Dongen	AT Motorsport									WD	WD							
Sport
1	(Belgium) Wiebe Wijtzes	EMG Motorsport	17	17	14	11	39	42	**10**	**12**	16	Ret	14	**13**	29	29	15	17	260
2	(Belgium) Bart van den Broeck	Traxx Racing	19	18	13	12	**41**	37	12	19	18	Ret	22	15	24	27	18	21	232
2	(Belgium) Chris Voet	Traxx Racing	19	18	13	12	**41**	37	12	19	18	Ret	22	15	24	27	18	21	232
3	(Netherlands) Rob Nieman	Spirit Racing	15	**14**	16	14	42	39	11	13	15	15	18	17	27	33	Ret	Ret	217
4	(Netherlands) Carlijn Bergsma	Van der Kooi Racing	Ret	24	**11**	**Ret**	Ret	41	14	17	**Ret**	**12**	**15**	20	**23**	**34**	21	**10**	190
4	(Netherlands) Pieter de Jong	Van der Kooi Racing	Ret	24	**11**	**Ret**	Ret	41	14	17	**Ret**	**12**			**23**	**34**	21	**10**	190
5	(Netherlands) Stan van Oord	Spirit Racing			10	13					12	13	17	14			**13**	15	147
6	(Netherlands) Marco Poland	Spirit Racing	13	21	Ret	Ret	43	38	13	15	14	18	Ret	18					133
6	(Netherlands) Toon Rutgers	Spirit Racing	13	21	Ret	Ret			13	15	14	18							133
7	(Netherlands) Kim Troeijen	AT Motorsport	23	19	Ret	Ret	DNS	DNS	18	20	19	14			25	30	20	22	122
8	(Netherlands) Benjamin van den Berg	Harders Plaza Racing	**22**	16			40	40									17	18	96
8	(Netherlands) John van der Voort	Harders Plaza Racing	**22**	16			40	40									17	18	96
Guest drivers ineligible for Sport points
	(Netherlands) Frank Bédorf	Spirit Racing	20	15			43	38	16	14									
	(Netherlands) Niels Kool	Day-V-Tec											16	19	28	28	16	16	
	(Poland) Maciej Dreszer	Dreszer Motorsport															14	11	
	(Netherlands) Stephane Kox	Dreszer Motorsport															14	11	
	(Belgium) Stephan Polderman	Team Bleekemolen									13	Ret							
	(Belgium) René Steenmetz	Team Bleekemolen									13	Ret							
	(Netherlands) Christiaan Frankenhout	Spirit Racing							16	14									
	(Netherlands) Wilbert van de Burg	Wilbert van de Burg															19	14	
	(Australia) Adam Bressington	West Suffolk Racing													26	31			
	(United Kingdom) Dave Griffin	West Suffolk Racing													26	31			
	(Netherlands) Laurens Gooshouwer	JR Motorsport											WD	WD					

Notes

- ^{1} – Xavier Mezquita and Reiner Weishaupt were guest drivers at Brands Hatch and therefore ineligible to score championship points.
- ^{2} – Priscilla Speelman was a guest driver at Assen (Round 9) and therefore ineligible to score championship points.

==== Superlights 1/Superlights 2 ====
Pos.	Driver	Team	ZAN (Netherlands)		ZOL (Belgium)		ZOL (Belgium)		SPA (Belgium)		ASS (Netherlands)		Total
Superlights 1
1	(Belgium) Luc de Cock	Deldiche Racing	**6**	**9**	**1**	**1**	**2**	**3**	**1**	**Ret**	**1**	**5**	132
1	(Belgium) Sam Dejonghe	Deldiche Racing	**6**	**9**	**1**	**1**	**2**	**3**	**1**	**Ret**	**1**	**5**	132
2	(Germany) Yorck Schumacher	Bas Koeten Racing	2	1	5	3	3	1	Ret	8	10	3	117
2	(Netherlands) Joey van Splunteren	Bas Koeten Racing	2	1	5	3	3	1	Ret	8	10	3	117
3	(Belgium) Tim Joosen	Ichiban Racing	4	4	3	7	DNS	4	3	2	2	2	116
3	(Belgium) Glenn Haverhals	Ichiban Racing	4	4	3	7	DNS	4	3	2	2	2	116
4	(Netherlands) Pim van Riet	Radical Benelux			4	10	1	2	2	1			78
5	(Netherlands) Henk Thuis	Radical Benelux	1	2	Ret	2	1	2	Ret	DNS			75
6	(Netherlands) Donald Molenaar	Radical Benelux	1	2	Ret	2							46
7	(Luxembourg) Jean-Pierre Lequeux	Prime Racing					Ret	14	5	10			33
7	(Luxembourg) Jerome Naveaux	Prime Racing					Ret	14	5	10			33
7	(Luxembourg) Jean-Marc Ueberecken	Prime Racing					Ret	14					33
8	(Netherlands) Rob Kamphues	Radical Benelux	5	5							3	Ret	29
9	(Germany) Ercan Osman	Teichmann Radical DE	12	12									15
9	(Germany) Michael Teichmann	Teichmann Radical DE	12	12									15
Guest drivers ineligible for Superlights 1 points
	(United Kingdom) James Abbott	Radical UK			2	4							
	(Netherlands) Bob Herber	Bas Koeten Racing	3	3									
	(Netherlands) Bas Schouten	Bas Koeten Racing	3	3									
	(Belgium) Christophe Burrick	No team name					4	5					
	(Belgium) Damian Delafosse	No team name					4	5					
	(Belgium) Jean-Lou Rihon	No team name					4	5					
	(Netherlands) Danny Brand	Radical Benelux			4	10							
	(Belgium) "Decourtis"	Radical Deutschland							4	Ret			
	(Germany) Bernd Rosenschon	Radical Deutschland							4	Ret			
Superlights 2
1	(Belgium) Filip Declercq	Glasfolie.be	7	7	**6**	**5**	5	10	**8**	**3**	**4**	**7**	143
2	(Germany) Heinz Kremer	Heinz Kremer Racing	10	14	10	11	11	11	6	7	9	11	97
3	(Netherlands) Paul Sieljes	BlueBerry Racing	13	8	7	6	**9**	**13**	7	Ret	7	DNS	97
4	(Belgium) Wim Jeuris	M-Racing	Ret	13	9	8	10	9	10	6	11	9	96
5	(Belgium) David Houthoofd	Norma Benelux	8	Ret	Ret	15	8	6	Ret	4	6	6	82
6	(Netherlands) Leon Rijnbeek	B&T Racing	11	11	11	12	13	12					49
7	(Netherlands) Wibo Rademaker	Radical Benelux	Ret	6	8	9							42
8	(Netherlands) Ko Koppejan	Radical Benelux	**16**	**DNS**			Ret	DNS	DNS	5	8	4	41
9	(Germany) Dominik Dierkes	DD-Compound	9	10	DNS	DNS			9	9	Ret	Ret	41
9	(Germany) Hauke Höschler	DD-Compound	9	10	DNS	DNS			9	9	Ret	Ret	41
10	(Netherlands) Carlo Kuijer	BlueBerry Racing	15	Ret	Ret	14	12	Ret					14
11	(Belgium) Jacques Derenne	Ichiban Racing			12	13							12
12	(Germany) Ingo Lauscher	Ingo Lauscher	14	15									10
Guest drivers ineligible for Superlights 2 points
	(Netherlands) Dick Freebird	Freebird					7	8			5	1	
	(Belgium) Vincent Desschans	Norma Benelux					8	6					
	(Netherlands) Donald Molenaar	Radical Benelux					6	7					
	(Belgium) Philip Vlieghe	Norma Benelux							Ret	4			
	(Netherlands) Robert de Graaff	BlueBerry Racing									12	8	
	(Netherlands) Phillipe Ribbens	BlueBerry Racing									12	8	
	(Belgium) Kenny Boeykens	Norma Benelux									Ret	10	
	(Belgium) Phillip Daniels	Domec Racing					Ret	15					

== See also ==
- Supercar Challenge (series)
