= Supercar Challenge (series) =

Benelux racing series

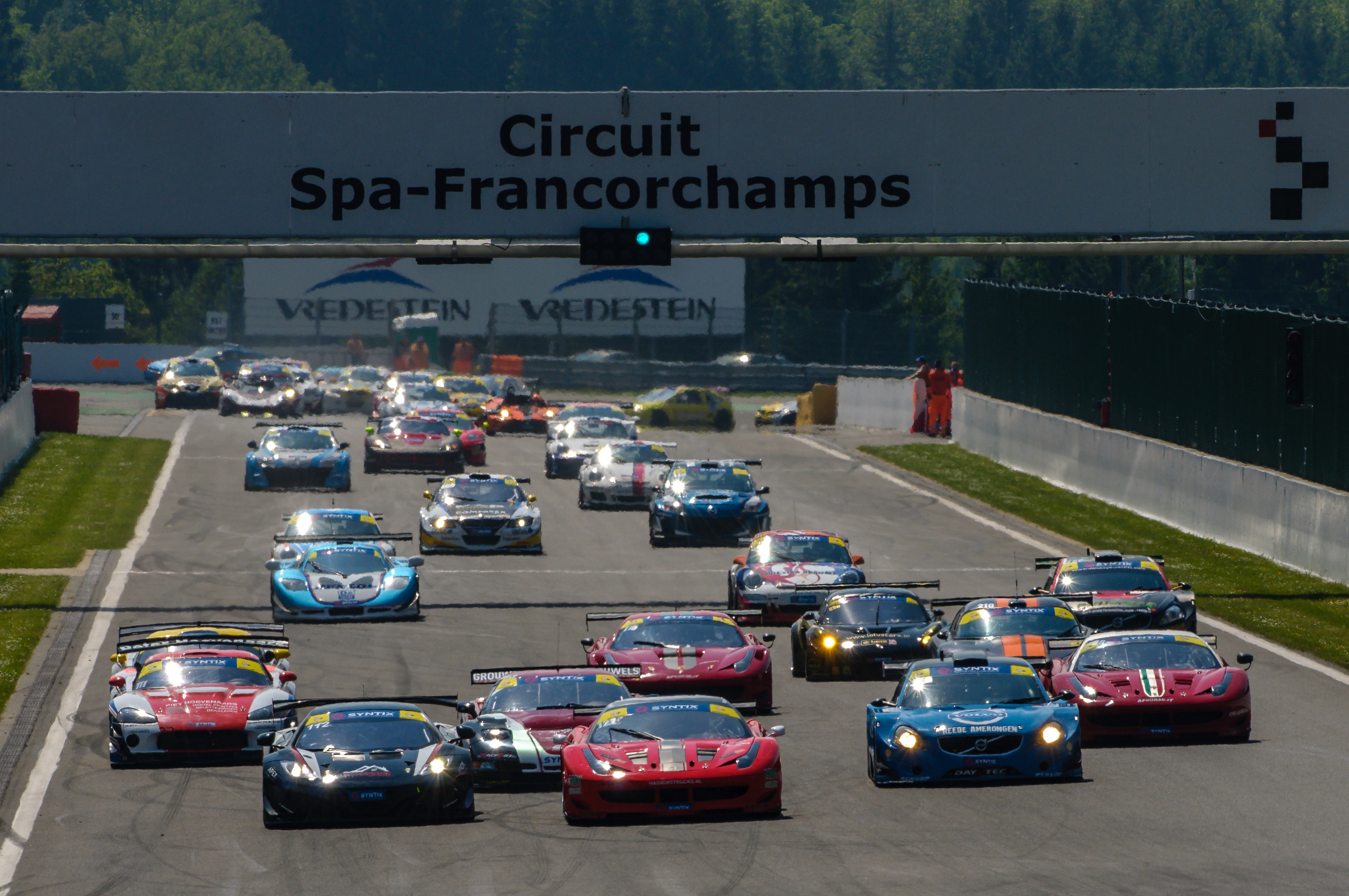
- Category: Touring cars, Sportscars and Sports prototypes
- Country: (Belgium) (Netherlands) (Luxembourg) Benelux
- Inaugural season: 2001
- Drivers: ~80
- Tyre suppliers: Hankook
- Drivers' champion: (Belgium) Wim Meulders (Belgium) Rik Renmans
- Official website: supercarchallenge.nl

The Supercar Challenge is a motor racing series centered on the Benelux. A special feature is that touring cars, GTs and Sportscars can all participate on an equal basis within the same class, enabled by very open regulations. The championship was first held in 2001, after replacing the Supercar Cup. From 2001 to 2011 the championship was called the Dutch Supercar Challenge, but due to interest from drivers, teams and tracks outside the Netherlands the organisers decided to drop 'Dutch' from its name on 11 February 2012.

== Format and regulations ==
A typical race weekend exists of the usual practice on Friday and Saturday, qualifying on Saturday and two races of 45 to 60 minutes with one pit stop of at least 60 seconds. One race is on Saturday and one Sunday. The four classes usually run separate races two classes at a time. The two fastest run together and the two slowest run their race separate. The exception is at Spa-Francorchamps where all four classes can and do run together in two races over the weekend. All races are started from a rolling start though in the past standing starts have been used as well. "Success time" is awarded after every race. The first-place finisher gets 15 seconds, second place gets 10, third place gets 5, fourth place loses 5 seconds, fifth place loses ten and all below fifth place lose 15 seconds. This is added to the time of the minimum pit stop duration. The reason no "success ballast" is used, is the immense variety in vehicles competing. For instance, a 50 kg weight has a much larger effect on a Lotus Elise than it has on a Dodge Viper Competition Coupe even though these can compete in the same class.

=== Classes ===
- Sport 1 : more than 5.0 Kg/HP Max. 3.000cc max 6 cilinders
- Supersport 2 : More than 4.6 Kg/HP
- Supersport : more than 4.3 Kg/HP
- Supersport+ : more than 3.6 Kg/HP
- GT : more than 3.1 Kg/HP

== Single make series ==
During most of its lifetime the Supercar Challenge has served as a host to many single make series. In the first two years the Marcos Mantis Cup ran within the GT class. In 2003 it was fully integrated in the GT class. Starting in 2008 the Mosler Challenge has run within GT. In 2010 three series were added. Those are BRL V6 and the Saker Challenge, not to be confused with the series of the same name the DNRT hosts, both within Supersport I and BRL Light in Supersport II. The BRL series were before separate events and still have a slightly different calendar. The races at Silverstone don't pay them points while the races at the Zolder truck Grand Prix do though to all other classes they don't count.

== Champions ==
=== Supercar Challenge ===
Season	GT	Supersport 1	Supersport 2	Sport 1	Sport 2	Marcos Mantis Cup	Mosler Challenge
2001	(Netherlands) Herman Buurman	(Netherlands) Ruud Olij	(Netherlands) Arjan Vels	(Netherlands) Dirk-Jan Hofmans		(Netherlands) Herman Buurman	
2002	(Netherlands) Cor Euser (Netherlands) Pieter van Soelen	(Netherlands) Rudolf van Soelen	(Netherlands) Arjan Vels			(Netherlands) Peter van der Kolk	
2003	(Netherlands) Rob Knook (Netherlands) Peter van der Kolk	(Netherlands) Hans Ambaum		(Netherlands) Albèrt Priem			
2004	(Netherlands) Cor Euser (Netherlands) Jos Menten	(United Kingdom) Graham Coomes		(Netherlands) Hans Ambaum			
2005	(Netherlands) Pieter Dubois (Netherlands) René Wijnen	(Netherlands) Lex van der Meijden		(Netherlands) Richard van den Berg			
2006	(Netherlands) Hans Ambaum	(Netherlands) Pieter van Soelen		(Netherlands) Eugène Janssen (Netherlands) Rolf van Os			
2007	(Netherlands) Ardi van der Hoek (Netherlands) Arjan van der Zwaan	(Netherlands) Peter van der Kolk	(United Kingdom) Tony Brown (United Kingdom) Ian White	(Netherlands) Kees Kreijne			
2008	(United Kingdom) Martin Short	(Netherlands) Henk Thuis	(Netherlands) Pieter van Soelen	(Belgium) Luc de Cock	(Netherlands) Rob Nieman		(United Kingdom) Martin Short
2009	(Netherlands) Cor Euser	(Belgium) Henk Haane (Netherlands) Nol Köhler	(Netherlands) Bert van der Zweerde	(Netherlands) Koen Bogaerts (Netherlands) Nik de Jong			(United Kingdom) Martin Short
2010	(Netherlands) Alex van 't Hoff	(Netherlands) Charlie Frijns (Netherlands) Rob Frijns	(Netherlands) Pieter van Soelen	(Netherlands) Richard van der Bos (Netherlands) Bert van der Zweerde			
2011	(Netherlands) Diederik Sijthoff	(Netherlands) Jaap van Lagen (Netherlands) Wolf Nathan	(Netherlands) Ferry Monster (Netherlands) Robin Monster	(Netherlands) Aart Bosman			
Season	Super GT	GT	GTB	Supersport	Sport 1	Sport 2	-
2012	(Netherlands) Diederik Sijthoff	(Netherlands) Barry Maessen	(Netherlands) Kees Kreijne	(Netherlands) Koen Bogaerts (Netherlands) Pieter van Soelen	(Netherlands) Priscilla Speelman (Netherlands) John van der Voort	(Netherlands) Rob Nieman	
2013	(United Kingdom) Glynn Geddie (United Kingdom) Jim Geddie	(Belgium) Steve van Bellingen (Belgium) Ward Sluys	(Belgium) Patrick Lamster (Belgium) Marc Neyens	(Netherlands) Ferry Monster (Netherlands) Robin Monster	(Netherlands) Aart Bosman		
Season	Super GT	GT	GTB	Supersport	Sport	Superlights 1	Superlights 2
2014	(Netherlands) Robert de Graaff (Netherlands) Roger Grouwels (Netherlands) Arjan van der Zwaan	(Belgium) Patrick van Glabeke (Belgium) Frédérique Jonckheere	(Netherlands) Max Koebolt	(Netherlands) Cor Euser	(Netherlands) Dennis de Borst (Netherlands) Martin de Kleijn	(Netherlands) Henk Thuis	(Netherlands) Carlo Kuijer
2015	(Netherlands) Roger Grouwels (Netherlands) Kelvin Snoeks		(Belgium) Kris Cools (Belgium) Patrick Lamster (Netherlands) Donald Molenaar	(Netherlands) Mark van der Aa (Netherlands) Koen Bogaerts (Netherlands) Pieter van Soelen	(Belgium) Wiebe Wijtzes	(Belgium) Luc de Cock (Belgium) Sam Dejonghe	(Belgium) Filip Declercq
2016	(Spain) Oliver Campos-Hull (Greece) Kosta Kanaroglou		(Belgium) Chris Mattheus (Belgium) Ward Sluys	(Netherlands) Dennis de Borst (Netherlands) Martin de Kleijn	(Netherlands) Bart Drost (Netherlands) Niels Kool	(Belgium) Luc de Cock (Belgium) Tim Joosen	(Germany) Dominik Dierkes
Season	Overall	GT	Supersport 1	Supersport 2	Sport	-	-
2017	(Belgium) Bart van den Broeck (Belgium) Chris Voet	(Netherlands) Bas Schouten (Belgium) Ward Sluys	(Netherlands) Dennis de Borst (Netherlands) Martin de Kleijn	(United Kingdom) Ollie Taylor	(Belgium) Bart van den Broeck (Belgium) Chris Voet		
2018	(Belgium) Bart van den Broeck (Belgium) Chris Voet	(Netherlands) Willem Meijer (Netherlands) Michael Verhagen	(Netherlands) Dennis de Borst (Netherlands) Stan van Oord	(Netherlands) Rogier de Leeuw (Netherlands) Patrick de Vreede	(Belgium) Bart van den Broeck (Belgium) Chris Voet		
2019	(Netherlands) Maxime Oosten (Netherlands) Milan Teekens	(Belgium) John de Wilde	(Netherlands) Dennis de Borst (Netherlands) Stan van Oord	(Netherlands) Maxime Oosten (Netherlands) Milan Teekens	(Netherlands) Rob Nieman		
2020	(Netherlands) Mark Wieringa	(Belgium) John de Wilde	(Netherlands) Oscar Gräper (Netherlands) Henry Zumbrink	(Netherlands) Berry van Elk	(Netherlands) Mark Wieringa		
2021	(Netherlands) Dennis de Borst (Netherlands) Stan van Oord	(Netherlands) Bob Herber	(Netherlands) Dennis de Borst (Netherlands) Stan van Oord	(United Kingdom) Jerome Greenhalgh (United Kingdom) Robin Greenhalgh	(Netherlands) Pieter de Jong (Netherlands) Jack Hokstra		
2022	(Netherlands) Bart Arendsen	(Netherlands) Bart Arendsen	(Netherlands) Dennis de Borst	(Netherlands) Laurens de Wit	(Netherlands) Mark Jobst		

==== BRL V6 ====
Season	Champion
2010	(Netherlands) Niels Bouwhuis

==== SEAT León Supercopa ====
Season	Champions
2012^{1}	(Netherlands) Ferry Monster (Netherlands) Robin Monster
2013^{1}	(Netherlands) Ferry Monster (Netherlands) Robin Monster
2014^{2}	(Belgium) Jonas de Kimpe

Notes

- ^{1} – The SEAT León Supercopa class was a class for just SEATs within the Supersport class.
- ^{2} – The SEAT León Supercopa class was a class for just SEATs within the Sport class.

==== Other Champions ====
Season	CN	Praga	SR8	SR3
2013	(Belgium) David Houthoofd (Belgium) Jürgen van Hover	(Netherlands) Danny van Dongen	(United Kingdom) Martin Short	(Netherlands) Ko Koppejan

=== Prototype Challenge ===
Season	Super GT	Divisie 2	Divisie 3	Divisie 4
2017	(Netherlands) Daan Meijer	(Luxembourg) David Hauser (Luxembourg) Gary Hauser	(Belgium) Luc de Cock (Belgium) Tim Joosen	(Belgium) Wim Jeuris
2018	(Germany) Oliver Freymuth	(Luxembourg) Jean-Pierre Lequeux (Luxembourg) Jean-Marc Ueberecken	(Luxembourg) Alain Berg (United Kingdom) Tim Gray	(Luxembourg) Alain Berg (United Kingdom) Alistair Boulton
Season	LMP3	CN	Radical/Praga	
2019	(Germany) Max Aschoff	(Belgium) Tom Boonen	(Luxembourg) Alain Berg	
2020	(Germany) Max Aschoff	(Luxembourg) Alain Berg (Romania) Alex Cascatău	(Germany) Dominik Dierkes	
2021	(Germany) Max Aschoff	(Belgium) Tom Boonen	(Netherlands) Max de Bruijn (Netherlands) Melvin van Dam	
2022	(Luxembourg) Gary Hauser (Luxembourg) Lea Mauer	(Belgium) Thomas Piessens	(Netherlands) Melvin van Dam	
