= 2018 GT & Prototype Challenge =

Car racing competition

The 2018 GT & Prototype Challenge was the second season of the GT & Prototype Challenge. It began at Circuit de Spa-Francorchamps 13 April and ended at TT Circuit Assen on 21 October.

== Calendar ==
| Round | Circuit | Date | Event | Notes |
|---|---|---|---|---|
| 1 | Circuit de Spa-Francorchamps, Belgium | 13–15 April | Spa Euro Races | Both races contested with cars from the Supercar Challenge. |
| 2 | Circuit Zolder, Belgium | 29–30 June–1 July | Zolder Superprix | |
| 3 | Circuit Zandvoort, Netherlands | 13–15 July | | Supporting Deutsche Tourenwagen Masters, Both races with GT class cars from the Supercar Challenge. |
| 4 | Circuit de Spa-Francorchamps, Belgium | 28–30 September | Spa Racing Festival | Both races contested with cars from the Supercar Challenge. |
| 5 | TT Circuit Assen, Netherlands | 19–21 October | Hankook Finale Races | Both races with GT class cars from the Supercar Challenge. |

== Regulations ==
The series entrants are divided over four classes. The GT class, from the Supercar Challenge Super GT class, forms the highest and fastest division. Cars with a 2,8kg per HP or more ratio are allowed to compete. This includes all Group GT3 class cars and specially built GT's such as the Solution F built Volvo S60 and Renault Sport R.S. 01. LMP3 spec cars first raced in the Supercar Challenge Super GT class in 2016. The class forms a separate class within the series open to all 2016 specification LMP3 machinery.

Two classes from the Supercar Challenge Superlights class are included in the new series. The fastest of the two is the Group CN class. Group CN specification cars built after 2014 are allowed to compete. The fourth, and slowest, class is the Radical SR3 class. Mainly a Radical SR3 spec class, the class is open to cars with comparable lap times. Also allowed are the Praga R1 and pre-2014 Group CN class cars.

== Entry list ==
| Team | Chassis | Engine | No. | Drivers | Rounds |
Super GT
| (United Arab Emirates) Dragon Racing | Ferrari 458 Italia GT3 | Ferrari 4.5 L V8 | 110 | (United Kingdom) Glynn Geddie | 1 |
| (United Arab Emirates) Dragon Racing | Ferrari 458 Italia GT3 | Ferrari 4.5 L V8 | 110 | (United Kingdom) Jim Geddie | 1 |
| (Germany) Oliver Freymuth | Lamborghini Huracán Super Trofeo Evo | Lamborghini 5.2 L V10 | 124 | (Germany) Oliver Freymuth | 1, 4 |
| (Netherlands) PUMAXS Racing | Pumax RT | Chevrolet LS7 6.7 L V8 | 172 | (Netherlands) Henk Thuis | 2 |
| (Netherlands) BlueBerry Racing | Mosler MT900R GT3 | Chevrolet LS7 7.0 L V8 | 173 | (Netherlands) Berry van Elk | 1–3 |
LMP3
| (Luxembourg) Prime Racing | Ginetta G57 P2 | Chevrolet LS3 6.2 L V8 | 212 | (Luxembourg) Jean-Pierre Lequeux | All |
| (Luxembourg) Prime Racing | Ginetta G57 P2 | Chevrolet LS3 6.2 L V8 | 212 | (Luxembourg) Jean-Marc Ueberecken | All |
| (Germany) EDEKA Aschoff Racing | Ginetta G58 | Ginetta Billet Block 6.2 L V8 | 213 | (Germany) Max Aschoff | 4–5 |
| (France) Pegasus Racing | Ginetta G57 P2 | Chevrolet LS3 6.2 L V8 | 229 | (France) Julien Schell | 4 |
| (Belgium) Powermotorsports | Norma M20 FC | Chevrolet LS3 6.2 L V8 | 265 | (Germany) Siegmar Pfeifer | 4 |
| (Spain) BE Motorsport | Ligier JS P3 | Nissan VK50VE 5.0 L V8 | 293 | (Spain) Javier Ibran Pardo | All |
| (Spain) BE Motorsport | Ligier JS P3 | Nissan VK50VE 5.0 L V8 | 293 | (Netherlands) Mathijs Bakker | All |
Group CN
| (United Kingdom) Tim Gray Motorsport | Norma M20 FC | Honda K20A 2.0 L I4 | 410 | (United Kingdom) Stefano Leaney | 1–2, 4 |
| (United Kingdom) Tim Gray Motorsport | Norma M20 FC | Honda K20A 2.0 L I4 | 410 | (United Kingdom) Neil Primrose | 1–2, 4 |
| (Germany) Deldiche Racing | Norma M20 FC | Honda K20A 2.0 L I4 | 420 | (Belgium) Luc de Cock | 2 |
| (Germany) Deldiche Racing | Norma M20 FC | Honda K20A 2.0 L I4 | 420 | (Belgium) Tim Joosen | 2 |
| (Luxembourg) Alain Berg | Radical SR8 | Suzuki RPE 2.7 L V8 | 473 | (Luxembourg) Alain Berg | 4 |
| (Germany) EDEKA Aschoff Racing | Praga R1R | Renault F4R 832 2.0 L I4 | 476 | (Germany) Max Aschoff | 2 |
| (United Kingdom) VR Motorsport | Praga R1T | Renault F4R 832 2.0 L I4 | 496 | (United Kingdom) Tim Gray | 1–4 |
| (United Kingdom) VR Motorsport | Praga R1T | Renault F4R 832 2.0 L I4 | 496 | (Luxembourg) Alain Berg | 1–3 |
| (United Kingdom) VR Motorsport | Praga R1T | Renault F4R 832 2.0 L I4 | 496 | (United Kingdom) Grant Williams | 4 |
| (United Kingdom) VR Motorsport | Praga R1 | Renault F4R 832 2.0 L I4 | 511 | (United Kingdom) Tim Gray | 4 (R2) |
| (Australia) Jam Motorsport | Wolf GB08 | Honda K20A 2.0 L I4 | 497 | (Australia) Roman Krumins | 2 |
| (Netherlands) Bas Koeten Racing | Wolf GB08 | Honda K20A 2.0 L I4 | 498 | (Netherlands) Rob Kamphues | 3 |
SR3 - Praga
| (United Kingdom) VR Motorsport | Radical SR3L | Suzuki RPE 1.5 L I4 | 501 | (Belgium) Wim Jeuris | 2 |
| (United Kingdom) VR Motorsport | Radical SR3 | Suzuki RPE 1.5 L I4 | 514 | (Luxembourg) Alain Berg | 1, 3–5 |
| (United Kingdom) VR Motorsport | Radical SR3 | Suzuki RPE 1.5 L I4 | 514 | (United Kingdom) Alistair Boulton | 1, 3–4 |
| (Netherlands) V-Max Racing | Praga R1 | Renault F4R 832 2.0 L I4 | 508 | (Netherlands) Dick van Elk | 1–2 |
| (Netherlands) V-Max Racing | Praga R1 | Renault F4R 832 2.0 L I4 | 510 | (Netherlands) Kelvin Snoeks | 3, 5 |
| (Netherlands) BlueBerry Racing | Praga R1 | Renault F4R 832 2.0 L I4 | 509 | (Netherlands) Leon Rijnbeek | 5 |
| (Netherlands) BlueBerry Racing | Praga R1 | Renault F4R 832 2.0 L I4 | 511 | (Netherlands) Danny van Dongen | 4 |
| (United Kingdom) ALP Racing | Saker RAPX | Subaru 2.0 L Flat-6 | 530 | (United Kingdom) David Brise | 4 |
| (United Kingdom) ALP Racing | Saker RAPX | Subaru 2.0 L Flat-6 | 530 | (United Kingdom) Alan Purbrick | 4 |
| | Praga R1 | Renault F4R 832 2.0 L I4 | 555 | (Belgium) Rodrigue Gillion | 2 |
| | Praga R1 | Renault F4R 832 2.0 L I4 | 555 | (Belgium) Bart Ooms | 2 |

== Race results ==
Bold indicates overall winner.

| Round | | Circuit | Super GT Winning Car | LMP3 Winning Car | Group CN Winning Car | SR3 - Praga Winning Car |
| Round | | Circuit | Super GT Winning Drivers | LMP3 Winning Drivers | Group CN Winning Drivers | SR3 - Praga Winning Drivers |
|---|---|---|---|---|---|---|
| 1 | R1 | (Belgium) Spa-Francorchamps | (United Arab Emirates) No. 110 Dragon Racing | (Luxembourg) No. 212 Prime Racing | **(United Kingdom) No. 410 Tim Gray Motorsport** | (United Kingdom) No. 514 VR Motorsport |
| 1 | R1 | (Belgium) Spa-Francorchamps | (United Kingdom) Glynn Geddie (United Kingdom) Jim Geddie | (Luxembourg) Jean-Pierre Lequeux (Luxembourg) Jean-Marc Ueberecken | **(United Kingdom) Stefano Leaney** **(United Kingdom) Neil Primrose** | (Luxembourg) Alain Berg (United Kingdom) Alistair Boulton |
| 1 | R2 | (Belgium) Spa-Francorchamps | **(United Arab Emirates) No. 110 Dragon Racing** | (Luxembourg) No. 212 Prime Racing | (United Kingdom) No. 496 VR Motorsport | (United Kingdom) No. 514 VR Motorsport |
| 1 | R2 | (Belgium) Spa-Francorchamps | **(United Kingdom) Glynn Geddie** **(United Kingdom) Jim Geddie** | (Luxembourg) Jean-Pierre Lequeux (Luxembourg) Jean-Marc Ueberecken | (Luxembourg) Alain Berg (United Kingdom) Tim Gray | (Luxembourg) Alain Berg (United Kingdom) Alistair Boulton |
| 2 | R1 | (Belgium) Zolder | (Netherlands) No. 172 PUMAXS Racing | (Luxembourg) No. 212 Prime Racing | **(Belgium) No. 420 Deldiche Racing** | (United Kingdom) No. 501 VR Motorsport |
| 2 | R1 | (Belgium) Zolder | (Netherlands) Henk Thuis | (Luxembourg) Jean-Pierre Lequeux (Luxembourg) Jean-Marc Ueberecken | **(Belgium) Luc de Cock** **(Belgium) Tim Joosen** | (Belgium) Wim Jeuris |
| 2 | R2 | (Belgium) Zolder | (Netherlands) No. 172 PUMAXS Racing | **(Luxembourg) No. 212 Prime Racing** | (Australia) No. 497 Jam Motorsport | No. 555 |
| 2 | R2 | (Belgium) Zolder | (Netherlands) Henk Thuis | **(Luxembourg) Jean-Pierre Lequeux** **(Luxembourg) Jean-Marc Ueberecken** | (Australia) Roman Krumins | (Belgium) Rodrigue Gillion (Belgium) Bart Ooms |
| 3 | R1 | (Netherlands) Zandvoort | No finishers | (Luxembourg) No. 212 Prime Racing | **(United Kingdom) No. 496 VR Motorsport** | (United Kingdom) No. 514 VR Motorsport |
| 3 | R1 | (Netherlands) Zandvoort | No finishers | (Luxembourg) Jean-Pierre Lequeux (Luxembourg) Jean-Marc Ueberecken | **(Luxembourg) Alain Berg** **(United Kingdom) Tim Gray** | (Luxembourg) Alain Berg (United Kingdom) Alistair Boulton |
| 3 | R2 | (Netherlands) Zandvoort | No starters | (Luxembourg) No. 212 Prime Racing | **(United Kingdom) No. 496 VR Motorsport** | (Netherlands) No. 510 V-Max Racing |
| 3 | R2 | (Netherlands) Zandvoort | No starters | (Luxembourg) Jean-Pierre Lequeux (Luxembourg) Jean-Marc Ueberecken | **(Luxembourg) Alain Berg** **(United Kingdom) Tim Gray** | (Netherlands) Kelvin Snoeks |
| 4 | R1 | (Belgium) Spa-Francorchamps | (Germany) No. 124 Oliver Freymuth | **(Germany) No. 213 EDEKA Aschoff Racing** | (United Kingdom) No. 410 Tim Gray Motorsport | (Netherlands) No. 511 Blueberry Racing |
| 4 | R1 | (Belgium) Spa-Francorchamps | (Germany) Oliver Freymuth | **(Germany) Max Aschoff** | (United Kingdom) Neil Primrose | (Netherlands) Danny van Dongen |
| 4 | R2 | (Belgium) Spa-Francorchamps | (Germany) No. 124 Oliver Freymuth | **(France) No. 229 Pegasus Racing** | (United Kingdom) No. 410 Tim Gray Motorsport | (United Kingdom) No. 514 VR Motorsport |
| 4 | R2 | (Belgium) Spa-Francorchamps | (Germany) Oliver Freymuth | **(France) Julien Schell** | (United Kingdom) Neil Primrose | (Luxembourg) Alain Berg (United Kingdom) Alistair Boulton |
| 5 | R1 | (Netherlands) Assen | No entries | **(Germany) No. 213 EDEKA Aschoff Racing** | No entries | (Netherlands) No. 510 V-Max Racing |
| 5 | R1 | (Netherlands) Assen | No entries | **(Germany) Max Aschoff** | No entries | (Netherlands) Kelvin Snoeks |
| 5 | R2 | (Netherlands) Assen | No entries | **(Spain) No. 293 BE Motorsport** | No entries | (Netherlands) No. 510 V-Max Racing |
| 5 | R2 | (Netherlands) Assen | No entries | **(Spain) Javier Ibran Pardo** **(Netherlands) Mathijs Bakker** | No entries | (Netherlands) Kelvin Snoeks |

== Championship standings ==
| Position | **1st** | **2nd** | **3rd** | **4th** | **5th** | **6th** | **7th** | **8th** | **9th** | **10th** | **11th** | **Pole** |
| Points | 23 | 20 | 17 | 15 | 13 | 11 | 9 | 7 | 5 | 3 | 1 | 1 |

| Pos. | Driver | Team | (Belgium) SPA | | (Belgium) ZOL | | (Netherlands) ZAN | | (Belgium) SPA | | (Netherlands) ASS | | Points |
Super GT
| 1 | (Germany) Oliver Freymuth | (Germany) Oliver Freymuth | 12 | DSQ | | | | | **5** | 5 | | | 64 |
| 2 | (United Kingdom) Glynn Geddie (United Kingdom) Jim Geddie | (United Arab Emirates) Dragon Racing | **3** | 1 | | | | | | | | | 47 |
| 3 | (Netherlands) Henk Thuis | (Netherlands) PUMAXS Racing | | | **5** | 4 | | | | | | | 47 |
| 4 | (Netherlands) Berry van Elk | (Netherlands) BlueBerry Racing | 4 | 17 | Ret | DNS | **Ret** | DNS | | | | | 41 |
LMP3
| 1 | (Luxembourg) Jean-Pierre Lequeux (Luxembourg) Jean-Marc Ueberecken | (Luxembourg) Prime Racing | **2** | 2 | **2** | 1 | **2** | 2 | 2 | 3 | 2 | 10 | 218 |
| 2 | (Spain) Javier Ibran Pardo | (Spain) BE Motorsport | 34 | 4 | 6 | 2 | 3 | 3 | 4 | 9 | Ret | 1 | 175 |
| 2 | (Netherlands) Mathijs Bakker | (Spain) BE Motorsport | 34 | 4 | 6 | 2 | 3 | 3 | WD | WD | Ret | 1 | 175 |
| 3 | (Germany) Max Aschoff | (Germany) EDEKA Aschoff Racing | | | | | | | 1 | 2 | **1** | Ret | 67 |
| 4 | (France) Julien Schell | (France) Pegasus Racing | | | | | | | **24** | 1 | | | 39 |
| 5 | (Germany) Siegmar Pfeifer | (Belgium) Powermotorsports | | | | | | | 33 | DNS | | | 13 |
Group CN
| 1 | (United Kingdom) Tim Gray | (United Kingdom) VR Motorsport | **Ret** | 5 | Ret | 8 | **1** | 1 | DNS | 18 | | | 108 |
| 1 | (Luxembourg) Alain Berg | (United Kingdom) VR Motorsport | **Ret** | 5 | | | **1** | 1 | | | | | 108 |
| 2 | (United Kingdom) Neil Primrose | (United Kingdom) Tim Gray Motorsport | 1 | 7 | DNS | DNS | | | **3** | 4 | | | 70 |
| 2 | (United Kingdom) Stefano Leaney | (United Kingdom) Tim Gray Motorsport | 1 | 7 | DNS | DNS | | | | | | | 70 |
| 3 | (Germany) Max Aschoff | (Germany) EDEKA Aschoff Racing | | | 3 | 7 | | | | | | | 40 |
| 4 | (Australia) Roman Krumins | (Australia) Jam Motorsport | | | 4 | 3 | | | | | | | 40 |
| 5 | (Netherlands) Rob Kamphues | (Netherlands) Bas Koeten Racing | | | | | 4 | 7 | | | | | 40 |
| 6 | (Belgium) Luc de Cock (Belgium) Tim Joosen | (Belgium) Deldiche Racing | | | **1** | DNS | | | | | | | 23 |
| 7 | (Luxembourg) Alain Berg | (Luxembourg) Alain Berg | | | | | | | 7 | DNS | | | 20 |
| | (United Kingdom) Grant Williams | (United Kingdom) VR Motorsport | | | | | | | DNS | | | | 0 |
SR3-Praga
| 1 | (Luxembourg) Alain Berg | (United Kingdom) VR Motorsport | **21** | 29 | | | 11 | 13 | 27 | 27 | 10 | 9 | 108 |
| 1 | (United Kingdom) Alistair Boulton | (United Kingdom) VR Motorsport | **21** | 29 | | | 11 | 13 | 27 | 27 | | | 108 |
| 2 | (Netherlands) Kelvin Snoeks | (Netherlands) V-Max Racing | | | | | **Ret** | 4 | | | **4** | 4 | 71 |
| 3 | (Belgium) Rodrigue Gillion (Belgium) Bart Ooms | | | | **8** | 5 | | | | | | | 44 |
| 4 | (Belgium) Wim Jeuris | (United Kingdom) VR Motorsport | | | 7 | 6 | | | | | | | 43 |
| 5 | (Netherlands) Danny van Dongen | (Netherlands) BlueBerry Racing | | | | | | | **17** | DNS | | | 24 |
| 6 | (Netherlands) Dick van Elk | (Netherlands) V-Max Racing | Ret | 31 | WD | WD | | | | | | | 20 |
| 7 | (United Kingdom) David Brise (United Kingdom) Alan Purbrick | (United Kingdom) ALP Racing | | | | | | | Ret | 31 | | | 20 |
| 8 | (Netherlands) Leon Rijnbeek | (Netherlands) BlueBerry Racing | | | | | | | | | 12 | DNS | 17 |
| Pos. | Driver | Team | (Belgium) SPA | | (Belgium) ZOL | | (Netherlands) ZAN | | (Belgium) SPA | | (Netherlands) ASS | | Points |

Key
| Colour | Result |
|---|---|
| Gold | Winner |
| Silver | Second place |
| Bronze | Third place |
| Green | Other points position |
| Blue | Other classified position |
| Blue | Not classified, finished (NC) |
| Purple | Not classified, retired (Ret) |
| Red | Did not qualify (DNQ) |
| Red | Did not pre-qualify (DNPQ) |
| Black | Disqualified (DSQ) |
| White | Did not start (DNS) |
| White | Race cancelled (C) |
| Blank | Did not practice (DNP) |
| Blank | Excluded (EX) |
| Blank | Did not arrive (DNA) |
| Blank | Withdrawn (WD) |
| Blank | Did not enter (cell empty) |
| Text formatting | Meaning |
| **Bold** | Pole position |
| Italics | Fastest lap |
