= Cor Euser =

Dutch racing driver (born 1957)

- Nationality: (Netherlands) Dutch
- Born: Cornelius Peter Euser; 25 April 1957 (age 69) Oss, Netherlands

Previous series
- 2003 2001-2003 1997–2000 1995–1996 1991 1991 1990–1992 1986–1989 1985 1983–1984 1982–1983: V8Star Series; Grand-Am Sports Car Series; FIA GT Championship; Global GT Championship; Deutsche Tourenwagen Meisterschaft; PPG Indy Car World Series; World Sportscar Championship; International Formula 3000; British Formula 3 German Formula 3 FIA European Formula 3

Championship titles
- 2022 2018 2014 2002, 2004, 2009 2002 1999 1981 1981: Spanish GT Championship C1-GPX; Dutch Race Driver Organisation M3; Supercar Challenge Supersport; Dutch Supercar Challenge GT Euro GT Series; DTCC; Euroseries Formula Ford; Dutch Formula Ford

Cornelius Peter Euser (born April 25, 1957) is a Dutch racing driver from Oss.

== Career ==
After winning several Formula Ford titles in 1980 and 1981, Euser went to the FIA European Formula Three Championship part-time in 1982 and 1983. He expanded his racing in 1984 competing in the British and German Formula Three series. He made his Formula 3000 debut in the final race of the 1986 season at Jarama after failing to qualify for the first race of the season. He made eight Formula 3000 starts the following year but failed to score points. He finally broke into the points in 1988, finishing 19th in the championship with a fifth place at Brands Hatch. During this period, Euser also participated in an episode of Run The Gauntlet, aired on ITV in the UK in 1988.

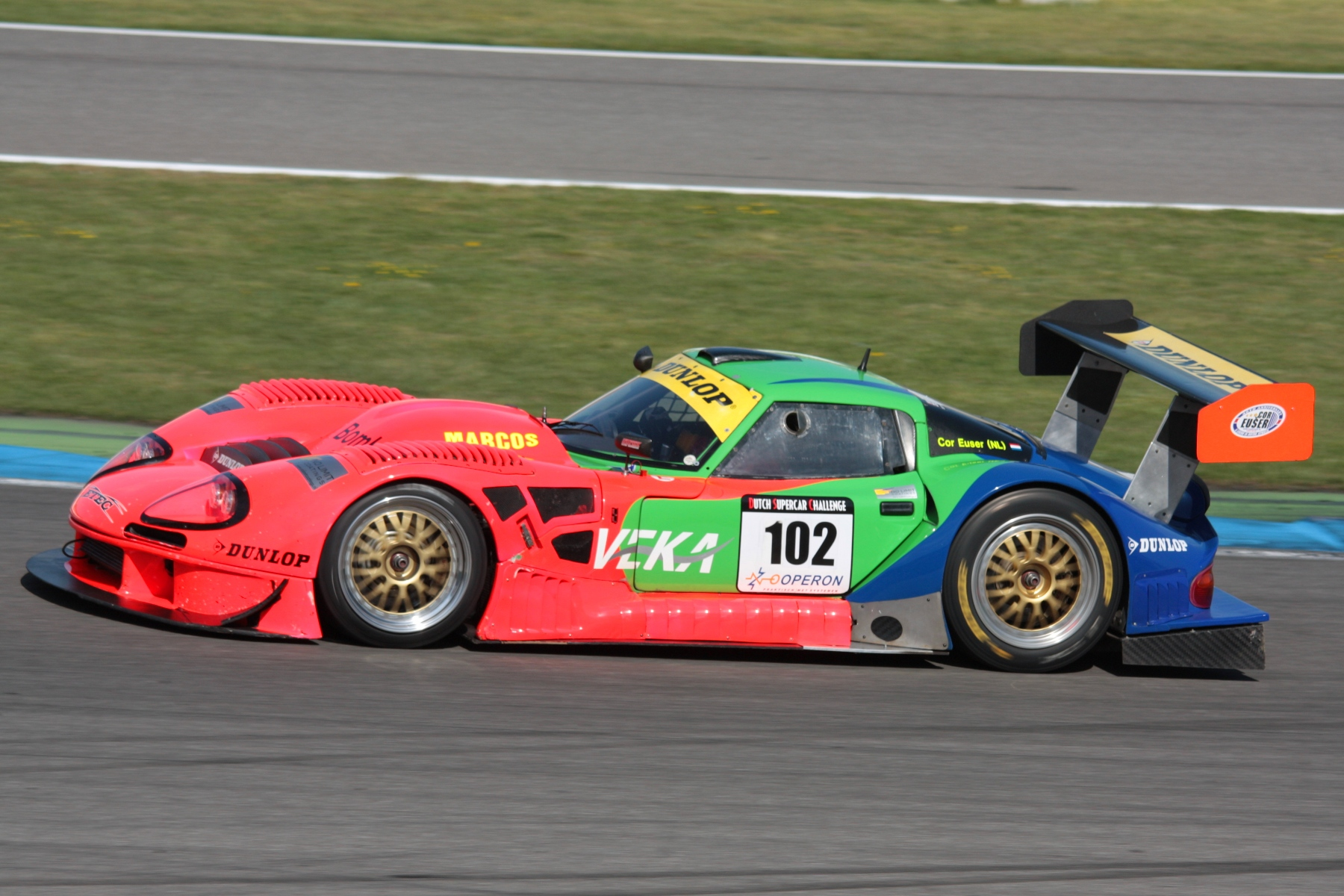
Euser's Marcos Mantara LM600

Euser transitioned to sports car racing in 1990 making 6 starts in the World Sports-Prototype Championship. In 1991, he competed full-time in both the Sportscar World Championship and DTM and made a single start in the CART World Series for Bettenhausen Motorsports at Laguna Seca Raceway. In 1991, he also made his 24 Hours of Le Mans debut driving for Euro Racing. In 1994, he drove at Le Mans in a Konrad Motorsport GT2 Porsche and in 1995 he became a factory driver for the Marcos racing marque.

While driving for Marcos, Euser purchased the rights to manufacture racing cars and entered them as Marcos Racing International. He has made several more Le Mans starts and campaigned their LM600 and Mantis cars in the BPR Global GT Series, FIA GT Championship, the British GT Championship, the Dutch Supercar Challenge, Belcar, the Spanish GT Championship, and numerous other endurance races held around the globe. As of 2016, Euser is still an active driver in various endurance races.

== Racing record ==
=== Racing career summary ===
Season	Series	Team	Races	Wins	Poles	F/Laps	Podiums	Points	Position
1980	Dutch Formula Ford	?	?	?	?	?	?	?	?
1981	Dutch Formula Ford	?	?	?	?	?	?	?	**1st**
1981	Formula Ford Euroseries	?	?	?	?	?	?	?	**1st**
1982	FIA European Formula 3 Championship	Barron Racing	1	0	0	0	0	0	NC
1983	German Formula Three Championship	Josef Kaufmann Racing	1	0	0	0	1	12	18th
1983	FIA European Formula 3 Championship	Josef Kaufmann Racing	2	0	0	0	0	0	NC
1983	Macau Grand Prix	Anson Racing International	0	0	0	0	0	N/A	DNS
1984	British Formula Three Championship - Class A	Magnum Race Cars	7	0	0	0	0	1	17th
1984	British Formula Three Championship - Class A	Cor Euser Racing	1	0	0	0	0	1	17th
1984	German Formula Three Championship	Josef Kaufmann Racing	6	1	1	1	3	57	7th
1984	FIA European Formula 3 Championship	Magnum Race Cars	0	0	0	0	0	0	NC
1985	British Formula Three Championship - Class A	Magnum Race Cars	2	0	1	0	0	3	13th
1986	International Formula 3000 Championship	Roger Cowman Racing	0	0	0	0	0	0	NC
1986	International Formula 3000 Championship	Colin Bennet Racing	1	0	0	0	0	0	NC
1987	International Formula 3000 Championship	Colin Bennet Racing	3	0	0	0	0	0	NC
1987	International Formula 3000 Championship	Bromley Motorsport	5	0	0	0	0	0	NC
1988	International Formula 3000 Championship	Madgwick International	6	0	0	0	0	2	19th
1988	International Formula 3000 Championship	Ralt Racing Ltd.	1	0	0	0	0	2	19th
1989	24 Hours of Spa - Division 5	Ford Nederland	1	0	0	0	0	0	5th
1989	International Formula 3000 Championship	Bromley Motorsport	1	0	0	0	0	0	NC
1989	SAT 1 Supercup - C2	Bross Druck Chemie Racing	0	0	0	0	0	0	NC
1990	World Sportscar Championship	Chamberlain Engineering	3	0	0	0	0	4	16th
1990	World Sportscar Championship	Spice Engineering	3	0	0	0	1	4	16th
1991	World Sportscar Championship	Euro Racing	6	0	0	0	0	54	4th
1991	24 Hours of Le Mans	Euro Racing	1	0	0	0	0	N/A	DNF
1991	IMSA GT Championship - GTP	Euro Racing	1	0	0	0	0	1	40th
1991	Deutsche Tourenwagen Meisterschaft	Marlboro BMW Dealer Team	13	0	0	0	0	0	NC
1991	Jaguar Challenge		3	1	1	0	1	?	?
1991	CART PPG Indy Car World Series	Bettenhausen Motorsports	1	0	0	0	0	3	27th
1992	World Sportscar Championship - Group C1	Euro Racing	5	0	0	0	0	0	NC
1992	24 Hours of Le Mans	Euro Racing	1	0	0	0	0	N/A	DNF
1992	IMSA GT Championship - GTP	Auto Toy Store	1	0	0	0	0	3	31st
1993	Interserie - Division I	Bross RF5 Jeans Team	2	0	0	0	1	?	?
1994	24 Hours of Le Mans - GT2	Konrad Motorsport	1	0	0	0	1	N/A	**3rd**
1994	24 Hours of Daytona - GTU	Konrad Motorsport	1	0	0	0	0	N/A	4th
1994	BPR Global GT Series - GT1	Konrad Motorsport	2	?	?	?	?	N/A	N/A
1994	BPR Global GT Series - GT3	Rosso Competition	0	0	0	0	0	N/A	N/A
1994	24 Hours of Spa - DTT	Fina Tankstellen-Team Schneider	1	0	0	0	1	N/A	**2nd**
1995	24 Hours of Daytona - LM WSC	Konrad Motorsport	1	0	0	0	0	N/A	**2nd**
1995	24 Hours of Le Mans - GT2	Team Marcos	1	0	0	0	0	N/A	DNF
1995	BRDC GT Championship - GT	Marcos Racing International	2	?	?	?	?	?	?
1995	Interserie - Division I	Cor Euser Racing	1	0	0	0	0	0	NC
1995	BPR Global GT Series - GT3	Team Marcos	1	?	?	?	?	?	?
1995	BPR Global GT Series - GT3	Marcos Racing International	2	?	?	?	?	?	?
1996	BRDC GT Championship - GT	Marcos Racing International	2	2	?	?	2	46	12th
1996	BPR Global GT Series - GT3	Marcos Racing International	11	3	0	0	5	?	?
1996	24 Hours of Le Mans - GT2	Team Marcos	1	0	0	0	0	0	DNF
1997	24 Hours of Daytona - GTS-2	Konrad Motorsport	1	0	0	0	0	N/A	DNF
1997	FIA GT Championship - GT2	Marcos Racing International	11	0	1	0	2	13	10th
1997	24 Hours of Le Mans - GT2	Marcos Racing International	1	0	0	0	0	N/A	DNF
1997	Interserie - Division I	Marcos Racing International	1	0	0	0	0	?	?
1998	24 Hours of Daytona - GT2	Prova Motorsports	1	0	0	0	0	N/A	DNF
1998	FIA GT Championship - GT2	Marcos Racing International	10	0	5	0	3	13	13th
1998	IMSA GT Championship - LMGT2	Marcos Racing International	2	0	0	0	1	33	9th
1999	24 Hours of Daytona - GT2	Marcos Racing	1	0	0	0	0	N/A	DNF
1999	Belcar - GT1	Marcos International	6	0	2	0	2	184	11th
1999	24 Hours of Zolder - GT1	Marcos International	1	0	0	0	1	N/A	**2nd**
1999	British GT Championship - GT2	Marcos Racing International	5	0	1	0	1	34	14th
1999	FIA GT Championship - GT	Marcos Racing International	5	0	0	0	0	0	NC
1999	Dutch Touring Car Championship		?	8	?	?	?	188	**1st**
1999	Spanish GT Championship - GT2	Marcos Racing International	4	2	0	0	2	10	17th
2000	FIA GT Championship - GT	Marcos Racing International	4	0	0	0	0	2.5	31st
2000	British GT Championship - GT	Marcos Racing International	10	3	3	4	6	96	**3rd**
2000	Dutch Marcos Mantis Cup	Marcos Racing International	2	1	0	0	2	37	14th
2000	Belcar - GTA	Marcos Racing International	2	0	0	0	1	60	81st
2000	24 Hours of Spa - SP	BPR	1	0	0	0	0	N/A	4th
2000	Spanish GT Championship - GT2	Marcos Racing International	4	2	1	0	3	?	?
2001	24 Hours of Daytona - GTS	Marcos Racing International	1	0	0	0	0	N/A	4th
2001	Grand American Road Racing Championship - GTS	Marcos Racing International	1	0	0	0	0	32	29th
2001	British GT Championship - GT	Marcos Racing International	1	0	0	0	1	10	23rd
2001	Dutch Supercar Challenge - GT1	Marcos Racing International	?	?	?	?	?	?	**3rd**
2001	Dutch Marcos Mantis Cup	Marcos Racing International	?	?	?	?	?	?	**2nd**
2001	Dutch Touring Car Championship	JJ Motorsport	13	2	0	1	7	154	**3rd**
2001	Belcar - GTA	H&P Race & Inc.	1	0	0	0	0	0	166th
2001	Spanish GT Championship - GT2	Marcos Racing International	3	0	0	0	0	?	?
2002	24 Hours of Daytona - GTS	Marcos Racing International	1	0	0	0	0	N/A	DNF
2002	Rolex Sports Car Series - GTS	Marcos Racing International	7	0	0	0	0	143	11th
2002	Dutch Supercar Challenge - GT1	Marcos Racing International	?	?	?	?	?	152	**1st**
2002	Euro GT Series - Class A	Marcos Racing International	12	5	5	0	10	209	**1st**
2002	Spanish GT Championship - GTB	Marcos Racing International	1	1	0	0	0	?	?
2003	24 Hours of Daytona - GT	Marcos USA	1	0	0	0	0	N/A	11th
2003	Rolex Sports Car Series - GT	Marcos USA	1	0	0	0	0	20	80th
2003	Euro GT Series - Class A	Marcos Racing International	5	2	4	0	2	47	4th
2003	Spanish GT Championship - GTA	Marcos Racing International	1	0	0	0	0	?	?
2003	Spanish GT Championship - SGT	Marcos Racing International	4	3	2	2	3	?	?
2003	Dutch Supercar Challenge - GT	Marcos Racing International	11	5	7	4	9	190	**2nd**
2003	1000 km of Spa - Guest	Marcos Racing International	1	0	0	0	0	N/A	DNF
2003	Belcar - GTA	Marcos Racing International	1	0	0	0	0	64	92nd
2003	Belcar - GTA	Eurotech/Hadegro Racing	2	0	0	0	0	64	92nd
2003	V8Star Series	Ryll Racing	2	0	0	0	0	6	20th
2004	Dutch Winter Endurance Series	Marcos Racing International	3	0	0	0	0	20	47th
2004	Spanish GT Championship - GTA	Marcos Racing International	8	1	1	0	3	28	7th
2004	Spanish GT Championship - GTB	Marcos Racing International	1	0	0	0	0	0	NC
2004	Dutch Supercar Challenge - GT	Marcos Racing International	?	?	?	?	?	285	**1st**
2004	Euro GT Series - GT	Marcos Racing International	1	1	1	1	1	?	?
2004	24 Hours of Zolder - TB	Marcos Racing International	1	0	0	0	0	N/A	DNF
2004	Belcar - G	Marcos Racing International	2	0	0	0	0	21	164th
2004	Belcar - TB	Meijers Motorsport	1	0	0	0	0	21	164th
2004	MW V6 Series		?	?	?	?	?	81	**3rd**
2004	Unipart Endurance Cup	DNRT	1	0	0	0	0	40	40th
2005	Dutch Winter Endurance Series	Marcos Racing International	3	0	0	0	0	26	18th
2005	Spanish GT Championship - GTA	Marcos Racing International	6	0	0	0	1	11	15th
2005	Spanish GT Championship - GTC	Marcos Racing International	5	3	0	0	4	38	4th
2005	Unipart Endurance Cup	Swindak Citybox-1	5	0	0	0	0	157	10th
2005	Belcar - GTB	Van Herck Racing	1	0	0	0	0	?	?
2005	Belcar - GTA	Eurotech Racing	1	0	0	0	0	?	?
2005	24 Hours of Zolder - GTA	Eurotech Racing	1	0	0	0	0	N/A	4th
2006	Dubai 24 Hour - A4	Motors Television	1	1	0	0	1	N/A	**1st**
2006	Dutch Winter Endurance Series	Marcos Racing International	1	0	0	0	0	3	190th
2006	International GT Open - GTA	Marcos Racing International	4	0	0	0	0	?	?
2006	Spanish GT Championship - GTA	Marcos Racing International	4	0	0	0	1	6	20th
2006	Euro GT Series - EGT2	Marcos Racing International	2	0	0	0	0	?	?
2006	24 Hours of Zolder - Class 1	Eurotech Racing	1	0	0	0	2	N/A	**2nd**
2006	BMW 130i Cup	Ekris Motorsport	12	0	0	0	3	112	4th
2007	Dubai 24 Hour - A5	Marcos Racing Team 1	1	0	0	0	0	N/A	DNF
2007	Dubai 24 Hour - D1	Marcos Racing Team 2	1	0	0	0	1	N/A	**3rd**
2007	Dutch Winter Endurance Series	Marcos Racing International	2	0	0	0	0	9	98th
2007	International GT Open - GTB	Marcos Racing International	11	0	0	0	0	?	?
2007	Britcar 24 Hour - GTC	Marcos Racing International	1	0	0	0	0	N/A	9th
2007	Spanish GT Championship - GTB	Marcos Racing International	2	0	0	0	0	4	15th
2008	Dubai 24 Hour - A5	Motors Television	1	0	0	0	1	N/A	**2nd**
2008	Dubai 24 Hour - SP2	CR8 Project	1	0	0	0	1	N/A	**2nd**
2008	Dutch Winter Endurance Series	Marcos Racing International	1	0	0	0	0	6	134th
2008	International GT Open - GTB	Marcos Racing International	2	0	0	0	0	0	NC
2008	Spanish GT Championship - GTS	Marcos Racing International	4	0	1	1	2	19	6th
2008	Dutch Supercar Challenge - GT	Marcos Racing International	14	3	?	?	5	134	4th
2008	24H Series - D1	Marcos Racing International	2	0	0	0	1	10	13th
2008	Tourwagen Diesel Cup	Renova Euser Team	6	0	0	0	1	42	19th
2009	Dubai 24 Hour - A5	Motors Television	1	0	0	0	1	N/A	**2nd**
2009	Dutch Supercar Challenge - GT	Marcos Racing International	16	6	4	2	12	255	**1st**
2009	24 Hours of Nürburgring - D1T	Marcos Racing International	1	0	0	0	0	N/A	6th
2009	Spanish GT Championship - GTS	Marcos Racing International	1	0	1	0	0	0	NC
2009	Dutch GT4 Championship	Certainty Racing Team by Day V Tec	2	0	0	1	0	4	29th
2009	Tourwagen Diesel Cup	Sanders Emmen	4	0	0	0	1	26	40th
2009	EuroBOSS	Ryschka Motorsport	2	0	0	0	1	?	?
2009	Volkswagen Endurance Cup Netherlands	Infinity Racing	?	0	0	0	0	257	16th
2010	Dubai 24 Hour - D1	Marcos Racing International	1	0	0	0	1	N/A	**1st**
2010	Dutch Supercar Challenge - GT	Marcos Racing International	16	7	7	5	9	219	**2nd**
2010	Spanish GT Championship - GTS	Marcos Racing International	2	0	0	0	1	8	16th
2010	BOSS GP - Open Class	Ryschka Motorsport	4	0	0	0	0	52	5th
2011	GT4 European Cup	Marcos Racing International	18	0	1	2	?	108	8th
2011	Dutch GT4 Championship	Marcos Racing International	14	1	1	3	8	92	7th
2011	Dutch Supercar Challenge - GT	Marcos Racing International	12	2	0	3	6	228	**3rd**
2011	Dutch Supercar Challenge - GT	Rudolph Racing	1	0	0	1	1	228	**3rd**
2011	Dutch Supercar Challenge - Supersport	Marcos Racing International	2	0	0	1	2	0	NC†
2011	24H Series - D1	Marcos Racing International	1	0	0	0	0	N/A	N/A
2011	Raceway Venray BRL V6	Geva Racing	6	0	0	0	0	67	16th
2011	BOSS GP - Masters	Geva Racing	1	0	0	0	0	0	NC
2012	Dutch Winter Endurance Series	Marcos Racing International	2	0	0	0	0	20	45th
2012	Supercar Challenge - Super GT	Marcos Racing International	2	1	0	1	1	0	NC†
2012	Supercar Challenge - Supersport	Cor Euser Racing	2	0	0	1	1	0	NC†
2012	Dutch GT Championship	Cor Euser Racing	7	1	0	2	3	42	16th
2013	Dutch Winter Endurance Series	Cor Euser Racing	2	0	0	0	0	11	24th
2013	GT4 European Trophy	Cor Euser Racing	8	0	0	0	3	98	**2nd**
2013	British GT Championship - GT4	Cor Euser Racing	1	0	0	0	1	18	12th
2013	Dutch GT Championship	Cor Euser Racing	5	0	0	0	3	48	7th
2013	24H Series - SP3	Cor Euser Racing	1	0	0	0	1	N/A	N/A
2014	GT4 European Series	Cor Euser Racing	2	0	0	0	0	6	10th
2014	Supercar Challenge - Supersport	Cor Euser Racing	13	5	3	2	8	244	**1st**
2014	Maxi Endurance 32 Hours - Touring	Cor Euser Racing	1	0	0	0	1	N/A	**1st**
2015	Dutch Winter Endurance Series	Cor Euser Racing	2	0	0	0	0	10	51st
2015	24H Series - SP3	Cor Euser Racing	5	1	0	1	2	N/A	N/A
2015	24H Series - A2	Cor Euser Racing	2	0	0	0	1	N/A	N/A
2015	24H Series - A5	Cor Euser Racing	1	0	0	0	0	N/A	N/A
2015	Supercar Challenge - Super GT	Cor Euser Racing	2	0	0	0	1	0	NC†
2015	Supercar Challenge - GTB	Cor Euser Racing	2	0	0	0	0	0	NC†
2015	Supercar Challenge - Supersport	Van der Kooi Racing	2	0	0	0	1	0	NC†
2016	24H Series - SP3	Cor Euser Racing	3	0	0	0	0	33	12th
2016	24H Series - A3	Cor Euser Racing	2	0	0	0	0	20	16th
2016	Touring Car Endurance Series - A3	Cor Euser Racing							
2017	24H Series - SP3-GT4	Cor Euser Racing	1	0	0	0	0	0	NC
2017	24H Series - A3	Cor Euser Racing	2	0	0	0	0	0	NC
2017	Supercar Challenge - GT	Cor Euser Racing	6	0	0	0	0	26	14th
2017	Supercar Challenge - Supersport 1	Cor Euser Racing	2	0	0	0	1	15	17th
2017	Dutch Race Driver Organisation	Cor Euser Racing	14	9	?	?	?	108	36th
2017	Touring Car Endurance Series - SP3-GT4	Cor Euser Racing							
2017	Touring Car Endurance Series - A3	Cor Euser Racing							
2017	Touring Car Endurance Series - D1	Cor Euser Racing							
2017	GT & Prototype Challenge - SR3 - Praga	BlueBerry Racing	2	2	1	1	2	52	4th
2017	VLN Series - CUP5	Pixum Team Adrenalin Motorsport	1	0	0	0	0	4	37th
2018	24H TCE Series - Continents Championship - SP3	Cor Euser Racing	3	2	1	0	3	52	**2nd**
2018	24H TCE Series - European Championship - SP3	Cor Euser Racing	1	0	0	0	1	0	NC
2018	Dutch Race Driver Organisation - M3	Cor Euser Racing	14	9	13	?	?	232	**1st**
2018	Supercar Challenge - GT	Cor Euser Racing	2	0	0	0	1	32	14th
2018	Supercar Challenge - Supersport 1	Cor Euser Racing	2	0	0	0	0	22	13th
2018	Supercar Challenge - Supersport 2	Cor Euser Racing	2	0	0	0	1	109	**3rd**
2018	Supercar Challenge - Supersport 2	DRDO	4	0	0	0	4	109	**3rd**
2019	24H GT Series - Continents Championship - SPX	Cor Euser Racing	4	0	0	0	1	34	**2nd**
2019	24H GT Series - European Championship - SPX	Cor Euser Racing	3	0	0	0	0	0	NC
2019	Supercar Challenge - GT	Cor Euser Racing	2	1	1	1	1	33	8th
2020	24H GT Series - Continents Championship - GTX	Cor Euser Racing	1	0	0	0	0	21	4th
2020	Dutch Winter Endurance Series	Kuepper Racing	1	0	0	0	0	6	40th
2020	Supercar Challenge - GT	Cor Euser Racing	2	0	0	0	2	33	6th
2021	Supercar Challenge - GT	Cor Euser Racing	2	0	0	1	1	33	16th
2022	Spanish GT Championship - C1-GPX	Cor Euser Racing	10	9	9	9	9	120	**1st**
2022	Supercar Challenge - GT	Cor Euser Racing	2	0	0	0	1	33	11th
2023	Masters Endurance Legends - GT	Cor Euser Racing	4	2	3	3	3	18	6th
2023	Masters GT Trophy - Invitational	Cor Euser Racing	2	1	0	0	2	0	NC†
2023	Dutch Race Driver Organisation - M3	Cor Euser Racing	1	?	?	?	?	?	?
2024	Supercar Challenge - GT	Boda Racing	8	1	0	?	5	95	**2nd**
2024	Masters Endurance Legends - GT	Cor Euser Racing	4	2	?	?	3	22	**1st**
2024	Endurance Racing Legends - GT1B	Cor Euser Racing	2	0	0	0	2	44	16th
2025	Belcar Endurance Championship - Super Sport	HBR Motorsport Powered by AR Performance							
2025	Supercar Challenge - GT	Cor Euser Racing	3	0	0	?	0	0	16th
2025	Supercar Challenge - Supersport	Cor Euser Racing	3	0	0	?	0	26	17th
2025	Endurance Racing Legends - GT1B	Cor Euser Racing	4	0	0	0	1	73	7th
2026	Supercar Challenge - GT	Cor Euser Racing	3	0	0	0	1	16	9th*
2026	Endurance Racing Legends - GT1B	Cor Euser Racing	2	0	0	0	0	?	?

^{*}Season still in progress. ^{†} As Euser was a guest driver, he was ineligible to score points.

=== Complete International Formula 3000 results ===
(key) (Races in bold indicate pole position; races in italics indicate fastest lap.)

Year	Entrant	Chassis	Engine	1	2	3	4	5	6	7	8	9	10	11	Pos.	Pts
1986	Roger Cowman Racing	March 85B	Cosworth	SIL; DNQ	VAL	PAU	SPA	IMO	MUG	PER	ÖST	BIR	BUG		NC	0
1986	Colin Bennett Opar	March 86B	Cosworth											JAR; Ret	NC	0
1987	Colin Bennett Racing	March 87B	Cosworth	SIL; 17	VAL; 14	SPA; Ret	PAU	DON	PER						NC	0
1987	Bromley Motorsport	Ralt RT21	Cosworth							BRH; Ret	BIR; Ret	IMO; 10	BUG; Ret	JAR; Ret	NC	0
1988	Madgwick International	Reynard 88D	Cosworth	JER; DNQ	VAL; 8	PAU; 9	SIL; DNQ	MNZ; Ret	PER; 7	BRH; 5	BIR; Ret				19th	2
1988	Ralt Racing Ltd.	Ralt RT22	Judd									BUG; 9	ZOL; DNQ	DIJ; DNQ	19th	2
1989	Bromley Motorsport	Reynard 89D	Cosworth	SIL	VAL	PAU	JER	PER	BRH	BIR	SPA; Ret	BUG	DIJ		NC	0

=== Complete Deutsche Tourenwagen Meisterschaft results ===
(key) (Races in bold indicate pole position) (Races in italics indicate fastest lap)

Year	Team	Car	1	2	3	4	5	6	7	8	9	10	11	12	13	14	15	16	17	18	19	20	21	22	23	24	Pos.	Pts
1991	Marlboro BMW Dealer Team	BMW M3 Sport Evo	ZOL; 1; 18	ZOL; 2; 19	HOC; 1	HOC; 2	NÜR; 1; 20	NÜR; 2 Ret	AVU; 1	AVU; 2	WUN; 1 Ret	WUN; 2 DNS	NOR; 1; 21	NOR; 2; 13	DIE; 1; 17	DIE; 2 Ret	NÜR; 1; 22	NÜR; 2; 20	ALE; 1	ALE; 2	HOC; 1; 21	HOC; 2; 14	BRN; 1	BRN; 2	DON; 1	DON; 2	NC	0

=== PPG Indycar Series ===
(key) (Races in bold indicate pole position; races in italics indicate fastest lap.)

Year	Team	Chassis	Engine	1	2	3	4	5	6	7	8	9	10	11	12	13	14	15	16	17	Pos.	Pts	Ref
1991	Bettenhausen Motorsports	Penske PC-19	Chevrolet 265A V8t	SRF	LBH	PHX	INDY	MIL	DET	POR	CLE	MEA	TOR	MCH	DEN	VAN	MDO	ROA	NAZ	LAG; 10	**27th**	**3**	

=== 24 Hours of Le Mans results ===
Year	Team	Co-drivers	Car	Class	Laps	Pos.	Class pos.
1991	(Netherlands) Euro Racing	(Netherlands) Charles Zwolsman (United Kingdom) Tim Harvey	Spice SE90C-Ford Cosworth	C1	72	DNF	DNF
1992	(Netherlands) Euro Racing	(Spain) Jesús Pareja (Netherlands) Charles Zwolsman	Lola T92/10-Judd	C1	50	DNF	DNF
1994	(Germany) Konrad Motorsport	(Netherlands) Patrick Huisman (Slovenia) Matiaz Tomlje	Porsche 911 Carrera RSR	GT2	295	10th	**3rd**
1995	(United Kingdom) Team Marcos	(United Kingdom) Chris Hodgetts (Brazil) Thomas Erdos	Marcos Mantara LM600-Chevrolet	GT2	133	DNF	DNF
1996	(United Kingdom) Team Marcos	(Brazil) Thomas Erdos (France) Pascal Dro	Marcos Mantara LM600-Chevrolet	GT2	40	DNF	DNF
1997	(Netherlands) Marcos Racing International	(Japan) Takaji Suzuki (Germany) Harald Becker	Marcos Mantara LM600-Chevrolet	GT2	15	DNF	DNF

=== Complete FIA GT Championship results ===
(key) (Races in bold indicate pole position) (Races in italics indicate fastest lap)

Year	Team	Car	Class	1	2	3	4	5	6	7	8	9	10	11	Pos.	Pts
1997	Marcos Racing International	Marcos LM600	GT2	HOC; Ret	SIL; Ret	HEL; 2	NÜR; Ret	SPA; 3	A1R; 9	SUZ; 10	DON; Ret	MUG; Ret	SEB; 4	**LAG**; Ret	11th	13
1998	Marcos Racing International	Marcos LM600	GT2	**OSC**; 6	SIL; Ret	HOC; Ret	DIJ; Ret	**HUN**; 3	**SUZ**; 3	**DON**; DSQ	A1R; Ret	**HOM**; 3	LAG; Ret		13th	13
1999	Marcos Racing International	Marcos Mantara LM600	GT	MNZ; 13	SIL	HOC; 10	HUN; 14	ZOL; Ret	OSC	DON	HOM	GLN	ZHU		NC	0
2000	Marcos Racing International	Marcos Mantara LM600	GT	VAL; Ret	EST; 6	MNZ; Ret	SIL; DNS	HUN; 5	ZOL	A1R	LAU	BRN	MAG		31st	2.5

=== Complete British GT Championship results ===
(key) (Races in bold indicate pole position) (Races in italics indicate fastest lap)

Year	Team	Car	Class	1	2	3	4	5	6	7	8	9	10	11	12	Pos	Points
2000	Marcos Racing International	Marcos Mantara LM600	GT	THR; 1	CRO; 1; 1	OUL; 1 WD	**DON**; **1**; 3	SIL; 1; 7	**BRH**; **1**; 2	DON; 1; 4	CRO; 1	SIL; 1; 6	SNE; 1; 1	SPA; 1; 2	**SIL**; **1**; 4	3rd	96

=== Britcar 24 Hour results ===
Year	Team	Co-Drivers	Car	Car No.	Class	Laps	Pos.	Class Pos.
2007	(Netherlands) Marcos Racing International	(Spain) José Luis Bermúdez de Castro (Netherlands) Jan de Wit	Marcos Mantis	27	GTC	467	26th	9th

=== Partial Supercar Challenge results ===
Year	Team	Car	Class	1	2	3	4	5	6	7	8	9	10	11	12	13	14	15	16	17	18	Pos	Pts
2011	Marcos Racing International	Marcos Mantara LM600	GT	HOC; 1; 4	HOC; 2; 8	DON; 1; 2	DON; 2 Ret	ASS; 1	ASS; 2	SPA; 1; 6	SPA; 2; 1	ZOL; 1; 1	ZOL; 2; 2	ASS; 1; 4	ASS; 2; 6				ASS; 1; 15	ASS; 2; 2		3rd	228
2011	Rudolph Racing	Chevrolet Corvette C5-R	GT													ZOL; 2						3rd	228
2011	Cor Euser Racing	Lotus Evora GT4	SS														SPA; 1; 22	SPA; 2; 21				NC†	0†
2012	Marcos Racing International	Marcos Mantara LM600	GT	ZOL; 1	ZOL; 2	ZAN; 1	ZAN; 2	NÜR; 1	NÜR; 2	SPA; 1	SPA; 2	ZOL; 1; 1	ZOL; 2 Ret	ASS; 1	ASS; 2	ZAN; 1	ZAN; 2					NC†	0†
2012	Cor Euser Racing	Lotus Evora GT4	SS															SPA; 1; 22	SPA; 2; 21	ASS; 1	ASS; 2	NC†	0†
2018	Cor Euser Racing	BMW M3 E46	SS1	SPA; 1	SPA; 2	ZAN; 1; 14	ZAN; 2; 16	ZOL; 1	ZOL; 2													13th	22
2018	Cor Euser Racing	Marcos Mantis GT3	GT							ZAN; 1; 8	ZAN; 2; 8											13th	22
2018	Cor Euser Racing	BMW M3 E46 GTR	SS2									ASS; 1; 25	ASS; 2; 12									3rd	109
2018	DRDO	BMW M3 E46	SS2											SPA; 1; 34	SPA; 2; 34	ASS; 1; 16	ASS; 2; 7					3rd	109
2019	Cor Euser Racing	MARC II V8	GT	MAG; 1	MAG; 2	ZOL; 1	ZOL; 2	SPA; 1	SPA; 2	ZAN; 1	ZAN; 2	**ASS**; **1**; 7	ASS; 2; 1	SPA; 1	SPA; 2							8th	33
2019	Cor Euser Racing	Marcos Mantis GT3	GT													ASS; 1 DNS	ASS; 2 DNS					8th	33
2020	Cor Euser Racing	MARC II V8	GT	ZAN; 1	ZAN; 2	ASS; 1	ASS; 2	ASS; 1; 4	ASS; 2; 4	ZAN; 1	ZAN; 2											6th	44
2021	Cor Euser Racing	MARC II V8	GT	ZAN; 1	ZAN; 2	HOC; 1	HOC; 2	SPA; 1	SPA; 2	ZOL; 1	ZOL; 2	ASS; 1; 8	ASS; 2; 4	ASS; 1	ASS; 2	SPA; 1	SPA; 2	ASS; 1	ASS; 2			16th	33
2022	Cor Euser Racing	MARC II V8	GT	ZAN; 1	ZAN; 2	HOC; 1	HOC; 2	ZOL; 1	ZOL; 2	SPA; 1	SPA; 2	ASS; 1; 8	ASS; 2; 4	ZAN; 1	ZAN; 2	SPA; 1	SPA; 2	ASS; 1	ASS; 2			11th	33

^{†} As Euser was a guest driver, he was ineligible to score points.
