= 2000 FIA GT Silverstone 500km =

Motorsport event

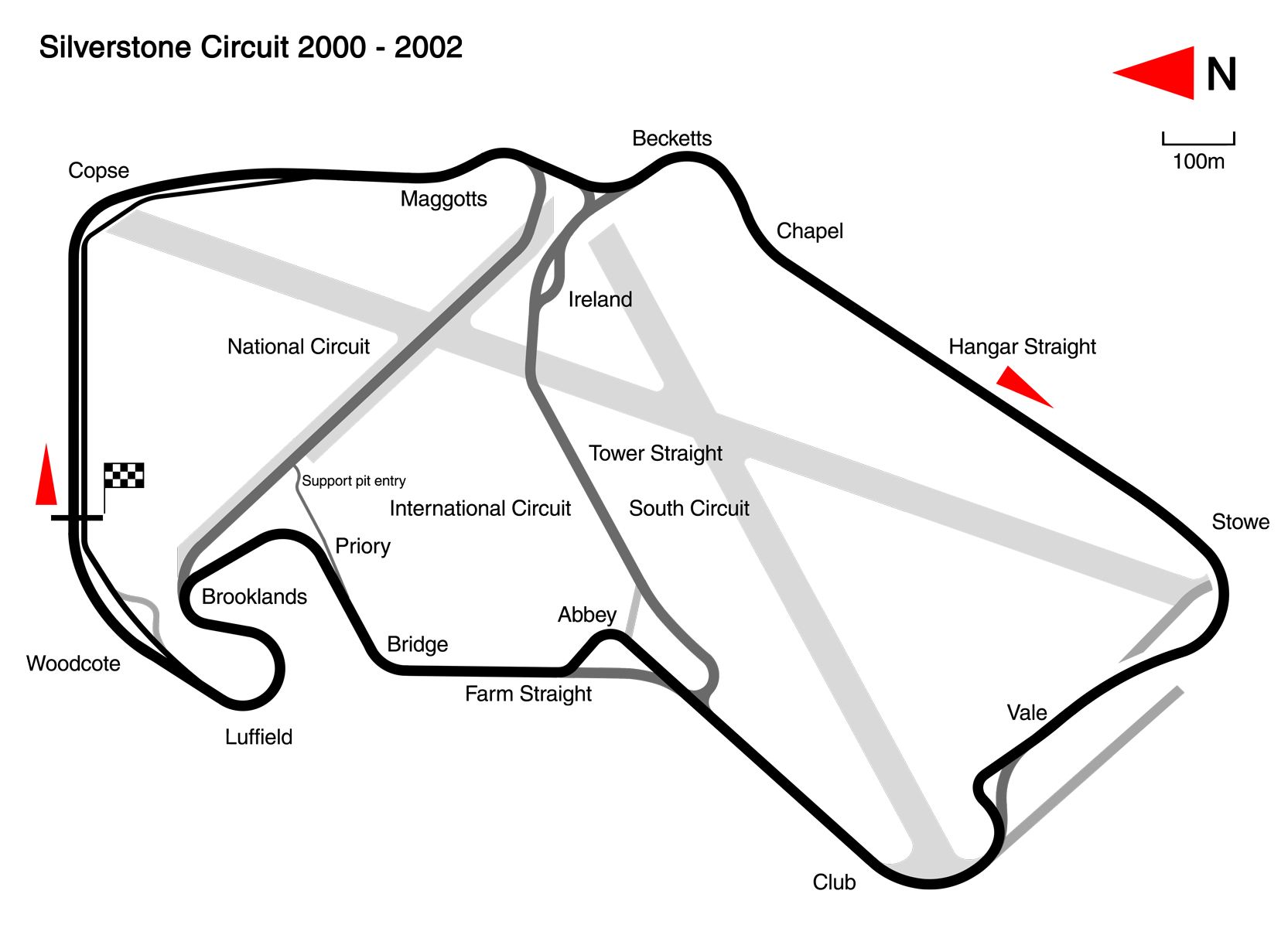
Map of the Silverstone Circuit (2000–2002)

The 2000 FIA GT Silverstone 500 km was the fourth round the 2000 FIA GT Championship season. It took place at the Silverstone Circuit, United Kingdom, on May 14, 2000. This event shared the weekend with the American Le Mans Series' Silverstone 500 USA Challenge, with some teams participating in both events.

== Results ==
Class winners in bold. Cars failing to complete 70% of winner's distance marked as Not Classified (NC).

| Pos | Class | No | Team | Drivers | Chassis | Tyre | Laps |
| Pos | Class | No | Team | Drivers | Engine | Tyre | Laps |
|---|---|---|---|---|---|---|---|
| 1 | **GT** | **14** | **(United Kingdom) Lister Storm Racing** | **(United Kingdom) Jamie Campbell-Walter (United Kingdom) Julian Bailey** | **Lister Storm** | **MI** | **94** |
| 1 | **GT** | **14** | **(United Kingdom) Lister Storm Racing** | **(United Kingdom) Jamie Campbell-Walter (United Kingdom) Julian Bailey** | **Jaguar 7.0L V12** | **MI** | **94** |
| 2 | GT | 25 | (Netherlands) Carsport Holland | (Netherlands) Mike Hezemans (Netherlands) David Hart | Chrysler Viper GTS-R | **MI** | 94 |
| 2 | GT | 25 | (Netherlands) Carsport Holland | (Netherlands) Mike Hezemans (Netherlands) David Hart | Chrysler 8.0L V10 | **MI** | 94 |
| 3 | GT | 11 | (France) Paul Belmondo Racing | (France) Paul Belmondo (France) Claude-Yves Gosselin | Chrysler Viper GTS-R | **D** | 93 |
| 3 | GT | 11 | (France) Paul Belmondo Racing | (France) Paul Belmondo (France) Claude-Yves Gosselin | Chrysler 8.0L V10 | **D** | 93 |
| 4 | GT | 1 | (United Kingdom) Chamberlain Motorsport | (Belgium) Didier Defourny (South Africa) Stephen Watson | Chrysler Viper GTS-R | **MI** | 93 |
| 4 | GT | 1 | (United Kingdom) Chamberlain Motorsport | (Belgium) Didier Defourny (South Africa) Stephen Watson | Chrysler 8.0L V10 | **MI** | 93 |
| 5 | GT | 10 | (France) Paul Belmondo Competition | (France) Jean-Claude Lagniez (France) Guy Martinolle | Chrysler Viper GTS-R | **D** | 93 |
| 5 | GT | 10 | (France) Paul Belmondo Competition | (France) Jean-Claude Lagniez (France) Guy Martinolle | Chrysler 8.0L V10 | **D** | 93 |
| 6 | GT | 5 | (Germany) Konrad Motorsport | (Austria) Franz Konrad (Germany) Jürgen von Gartzen | Porsche 911 GT2 | **D** | 92 |
| 6 | GT | 5 | (Germany) Konrad Motorsport | (Austria) Franz Konrad (Germany) Jürgen von Gartzen | Porsche 3.8L Turbo Flat-6 | **D** | 92 |
| 7 | GT | 2 | (United Kingdom) Chamberlain Motorsport | (Switzerland) Walter Brun (Switzerland) Toni Seiler | Chrysler Viper GTS-R | **MI** | 92 |
| 7 | GT | 2 | (United Kingdom) Chamberlain Motorsport | (Switzerland) Walter Brun (Switzerland) Toni Seiler | Chrysler 8.0L V10 | **MI** | 92 |
| 8 | GT | 15 | (United Kingdom) Lister Storm Racing | (Germany) Nicolaus Springer (Switzerland) Philippe Favre | Lister Storm | **MI** | 92 |
| 8 | GT | 15 | (United Kingdom) Lister Storm Racing | (Germany) Nicolaus Springer (Switzerland) Philippe Favre | Jaguar 7.0L V12 | **MI** | 92 |
| 9 | GT | 29 | (France) Team A.R.T. | (France) Jean-Pierre Jarier (France) François Lafon | Chrysler Viper GTS-R | **MI** | 91 |
| 9 | GT | 29 | (France) Team A.R.T. | (France) Jean-Pierre Jarier (France) François Lafon | Chrysler 8.0L V10 | **MI** | 91 |
| 10 | GT | 45 | (Austria) Team Felbermayr | (Austria) Horst Felbermayr Sr. (Austria) Horst Felbermayr Jr. | Chrysler Viper GTS-R | ? | 91 |
| 10 | GT | 45 | (Austria) Team Felbermayr | (Austria) Horst Felbermayr Sr. (Austria) Horst Felbermayr Jr. | Chrysler 8.0L V10 | ? | 91 |
| 11 | **N-GT** | **52** | **(France) Larbre Compétition Chéreau** | **(France) Christophe Bouchut (France) Patrice Goueslard** | **Porsche 911 GT3-R** | **MI** | **91** |
| 11 | **N-GT** | **52** | **(France) Larbre Compétition Chéreau** | **(France) Christophe Bouchut (France) Patrice Goueslard** | **Porsche 3.6L Flat-6** | **MI** | **91** |
| 12 | N-GT | 77 | (Germany) RWS Red Bull Racing | (Italy) Luca Riccitelli (Belgium) Hans Willems | Porsche 911 GT3-R | **MI** | 90 |
| 12 | N-GT | 77 | (Germany) RWS Red Bull Racing | (Italy) Luca Riccitelli (Belgium) Hans Willems | Porsche 3.6L Flat-6 | **MI** | 90 |
| 13 | N-GT | 51 | (United Kingdom) Pennzoil Quaker State G-Force | (United Kingdom) Nigel Smith (Belgium) Michel Neugarten | Porsche 911 GT3-R | **D** | 90 |
| 13 | N-GT | 51 | (United Kingdom) Pennzoil Quaker State G-Force | (United Kingdom) Nigel Smith (Belgium) Michel Neugarten | Porsche 3.6L Flat-6 | **D** | 90 |
| 14 | N-GT | 50 | (United Kingdom) Pennzoil Quaker State G-Force | (United Kingdom) Robert Nearn (Sweden) Magnus Wallinder | Porsche 911 GT3-R | **D** | 89 |
| 14 | N-GT | 50 | (United Kingdom) Pennzoil Quaker State G-Force | (United Kingdom) Robert Nearn (Sweden) Magnus Wallinder | Porsche 3.6L Flat-6 | **D** | 89 |
| 15 | N-GT | 53 | (France) Larbre Compétition Chéreau | (France) Ferdinand de Lesseps (France) Jean-Luc Chéreau | Porsche 911 GT3-R | **MI** | 88 |
| 15 | N-GT | 53 | (France) Larbre Compétition Chéreau | (France) Ferdinand de Lesseps (France) Jean-Luc Chéreau | Porsche 3.6L Flat-6 | **MI** | 88 |
| 16 | GT | 8 | (Switzerland) Haberthur Racing | (France) Patrick Vuillaume (Austria) Manfred Jurasz | Porsche 911 GT2 | **D** | 87 |
| 16 | GT | 8 | (Switzerland) Haberthur Racing | (France) Patrick Vuillaume (Austria) Manfred Jurasz | Porsche 3.8L Turbo Flat-6 | **D** | 87 |
| 17 | N-GT | 55 | (Italy) ART Engineering | (Italy) Constantino Bertuzzi (Italy) Pierangelo Masselli | Porsche 911 GT3-R | **P** | 87 |
| 17 | N-GT | 55 | (Italy) ART Engineering | (Italy) Constantino Bertuzzi (Italy) Pierangelo Masselli | Porsche 3.6L Flat-6 | **P** | 87 |
| 18 | N-GT | 68 | (Germany) Seikel Motorsport | (Canada) Tony Burgess (Morocco) Max Cohen-Olivar | Porsche 911 GT3-R | **D** | 86 |
| 18 | N-GT | 68 | (Germany) Seikel Motorsport | (Canada) Tony Burgess (Morocco) Max Cohen-Olivar | Porsche 3.6L Flat-6 | **D** | 86 |
| 19 | N-GT | 67 | (Italy) MAC Racing | (Italy) Fabio Mancini (Italy) Gianni Collini | Porsche 911 GT3-R | **D** | 86 |
| 19 | N-GT | 67 | (Italy) MAC Racing | (Italy) Fabio Mancini (Italy) Gianni Collini | Porsche 3.6L Flat-6 | **D** | 86 |
| 20 | N-GT | 78 | (United Kingdom) Cirtek Motorsport | (United Kingdom) Paul Phillips (United Kingdom) Adam Topping (United Kingdom) Robert Schirle | Porsche 911 GT3-R | ? | 85 |
| 20 | N-GT | 78 | (United Kingdom) Cirtek Motorsport | (United Kingdom) Paul Phillips (United Kingdom) Adam Topping (United Kingdom) Robert Schirle | Porsche 3.6L Flat-6 | ? | 85 |
| 21 | N-GT | 70 | (France) JMB Competition | (Italy) Marco Lambertini (Italy) Batti Pregliasco | Ferrari 360 Modena N-GT | **P** | 85 |
| 21 | N-GT | 70 | (France) JMB Competition | (Italy) Marco Lambertini (Italy) Batti Pregliasco | Ferrari 3.6L V8 | **P** | 85 |
| 22 | N-GT | 63 | (Switzerland) Team LR Organisation | (France) Michel Ligonnet (Belgium) Christophe d'Ansembourg (Belgium) Stanislas De Sadeleer | Porsche 911 GT3-R | **P** | 85 |
| 22 | N-GT | 63 | (Switzerland) Team LR Organisation | (France) Michel Ligonnet (Belgium) Christophe d'Ansembourg (Belgium) Stanislas De Sadeleer | Porsche 3.6L Flat-6 | **P** | 85 |
| 23 | N-GT | 56 | (United Kingdom) EMKA GTC | (United Kingdom) Steve O'Rourke (United Kingdom) Tim Sugden | Porsche 911 GT3-R | **P** | 85 |
| 23 | N-GT | 56 | (United Kingdom) EMKA GTC | (United Kingdom) Steve O'Rourke (United Kingdom) Tim Sugden | Porsche 3.6L Flat-6 | **P** | 85 |
| 24 | N-GT | 71 | (France) JMB Competition | (France) Philippe Alliot (Netherlands) Peter Kutemann | Ferrari 360 Modena N-GT | **P** | 80 |
| 24 | N-GT | 71 | (France) JMB Competition | (France) Philippe Alliot (Netherlands) Peter Kutemann | Ferrari 3.6L V8 | **P** | 80 |
| 25 DNF | GT | 7 | (Germany) Proton Competition | (Germany) Gerold Ried (Germany) Christian Ried (Italy) Mauro Casadei | Porsche 911 GT2 | **Y** | 59 |
| 25 DNF | GT | 7 | (Germany) Proton Competition | (Germany) Gerold Ried (Germany) Christian Ried (Italy) Mauro Casadei | Porsche 3.6L Turbo Flat-6 | **Y** | 59 |
| 26 DNF | GT | 12 | (France) Paul Belmondo Racing | (France) Boris Derichebourg (Belgium) Vincent Vosse | Chrysler Viper GTS-R | **D** | 50 |
| 26 DNF | GT | 12 | (France) Paul Belmondo Racing | (France) Boris Derichebourg (Belgium) Vincent Vosse | Chrysler 8.0L V10 | **D** | 50 |
| 27 DNF | GT | 27 | (Italy) Autorlando | (Italy) Marco Spinelli (Italy) Fabio Villa (Italy) Gabriele Sabatini | Porsche 911 GT2 | **P** | 44 |
| 27 DNF | GT | 27 | (Italy) Autorlando | (Italy) Marco Spinelli (Italy) Fabio Villa (Italy) Gabriele Sabatini | Porsche 3.8L Turbo Flat-6 | **P** | 44 |
| 28 DNF | GT | 21 | (Italy) Racing Box | (Italy) Luca Cappellari (Italy) Raffaele Sangiuolo (Italy) Gabriele Matteuzzi | Chrysler Viper GTS-R | **D** | 27 |
| 28 DNF | GT | 21 | (Italy) Racing Box | (Italy) Luca Cappellari (Italy) Raffaele Sangiuolo (Italy) Gabriele Matteuzzi | Chrysler 8.0L V10 | **D** | 27 |
| 29 DNF | GT | 3 | (Germany) Freisinger Motorsport | (France) Stéphane Ortelli (Germany) Wolfgang Kaufmann | Porsche 911 GT2 | **D** | 9 |
| 29 DNF | GT | 3 | (Germany) Freisinger Motorsport | (France) Stéphane Ortelli (Germany) Wolfgang Kaufmann | Porsche 3.8L Turbo Flat-6 | **D** | 9 |
| DNS | GT | 4 | (Germany) Freisinger Motorsport | (Germany) Ernst Palmberger (Japan) Yukihiro Hane | Porsche 911 GT2 | **D** | – |
| DNS | GT | 4 | (Germany) Freisinger Motorsport | (Germany) Ernst Palmberger (Japan) Yukihiro Hane | Porsche 3.8L Turbo Flat-6 | **D** | – |
| DNS | GT | 19 | (Netherlands) Marcos Racing International | (Netherlands) Cor Euser (Germany) Harald Becker | Marcos Mantara LM600 | **D** | – |
| DNS | GT | 19 | (Netherlands) Marcos Racing International | (Netherlands) Cor Euser (Germany) Harald Becker | Chevrolet 5.9L V8 | **D** | – |
| DNS | GT | 23 | (Germany) KRT Lamborghini Racing | (Germany) Günther Kronsender (Germany) Josef Jobst | Lamborghini Diablo GTR | **MI** | – |
| DNS | GT | 23 | (Germany) KRT Lamborghini Racing | (Germany) Günther Kronsender (Germany) Josef Jobst | Lamborghini 6.0L V12 | **MI** | – |
| DNS | GT | 44 | (United Kingdom) BVB Motorsport | (United Kingdom) Geoff Lister (United Kingdom) Max Beeverbroock | Porsche 911 GT2 | **D** | – |
| DNS | GT | 44 | (United Kingdom) BVB Motorsport | (United Kingdom) Geoff Lister (United Kingdom) Max Beeverbroock | Porsche 3.8L Turbo Flat-6 | **D** | – |

== Statistics ==
- Pole position – #14 Lister Storm Racing – 1:48.653
- Fastest lap – #14 Lister Storm Racing – 1:50.233
- Average speed – 159.792 km/h

FIA GT Championship
| Previous race: 2000 FIA GT Monza 500km | 2000 season | Next race: 2000 FIA GT Budapest 500km |
