= 2020 Supercar Challenge =

Car racing competition

The 2020 Supercar Challenge powered by Hankook was the twentieth Supercar Challenge season since it replaced the Supercar Cup in 2001. It began at Circuit Zolder on 7 August and ended at Circuit Zandvoort on 11 October.

== Calendar ==
Round	Circuit	Date	Classes	Event	Notes
1	Circuit Zandvoort, Netherlands	21–23 August	All	Attic Superprix	
2	TT Circuit Assen, Netherlands	4–6 September	All		Supporting 2020 Deutsche Tourenwagen Masters.
3	TT Circuit Assen, Netherlands	25–27 September	All	Gamma Racing Day	
4	Circuit Zandvoort, Netherlands	9–11 October	All	Voorjaars Races	
Cancelled due to the 2019-20 coronavirus pandemic
	Circuit Zolder, Belgium	7–9 August	All	Attic Superprix	
	TT Circuit Assen, Netherlands	30 October–1 November	All	Hankook Finale Races	Supporting 2020 ADAC TCR Germany Touring Car Championship
	Circuit Zolder, Belgium	5 November	All	Hankook Finale Races	

== Entry list ==
Team	Car	No.	Drivers	Class	Rounds
(Netherlands) Cor Euser Racing	MARC II V8	100	(Netherlands) Cor Euser	GT	3
(Belgium) Speedlover	Porsche 991 GT3 Cup II	101	(Belgium) John de Wilde	GT	1–3
(Netherlands) BODA Racing	Lamborghini Huracán Super Trofeo Evo	106	(Netherlands) Bob Herber	GT	1, 4
(Netherlands) BODA Racing	Porsche 991 GT3 Cup II	124	(Netherlands) Daan Meijer	GT	1, 4
(Netherlands) BODA Racing	Porsche 991 GT3 Cup II	124	(Netherlands) Jaap van Lagen	GT	1
(Netherlands) Johan Kraan Motorsport	Lamborghini Huracán Super Trofeo Evo	107	(Netherlands) Max Weering	GT	3
(Belgium) Total Plan Racing Team	Lamborghini Huracán Super Trofeo Evo	120	(Belgium) Kenneth Lenthout	GT	2
(Belgium) Total Plan Racing Team	Lamborghini Huracán Super Trofeo Evo	120	(Belgium) Mario Martlé	GT	2
(Netherlands) JW Race Service	Porsche 991 GT3 Cup II	140	(Netherlands) Huub van Eijndhoven	GT	1–3
(Netherlands) JW Race Service	CUPRA León TCR	322	(Netherlands) Serge Huffmeijer	SS2	4
(Netherlands) JW Race Service	SEAT Ibiza	425	(Netherlands) Estella van der Wiel	Sport	1–2
(Netherlands) JW Race Service	SEAT Ibiza	425	(Netherlands) Tom van der Zwet	Sport	1–2
(Netherlands) JW Race Service	Volkswagen Golf	425	(Netherlands) Jim Ringelberg	Sport	3
(Netherlands) JW Race Service	Volkswagen Golf	425	(Netherlands) Estella van de Wiel	Sport	3
(Netherlands) Koopman Racing	BMW Z4 GT3	190	(Netherlands) Hein Koopman	GT	2–4
(Netherlands) Koopman Racing	BMW 1 Series GTR	206	(Netherlands) Bart Arendsen	SS1	1–4
(Netherlands) FEBO Racing Team	Hyundai i30 N TCR	201	(Netherlands) Dennis de Borst	SS1	All
(Netherlands) FEBO Racing Team	Hyundai i30 N TCR	201	(Netherlands) Lorenzo van Riet	SS1	All
(Netherlands) Ferry Monster Autosport (Note: Cars no. 202 and 266 were entered as Ferry Monster Autosport, car no. 250 was entered as Gräper Racing powered by FMA and car no. 264 was entered as DK-Racing powered by FMA.) (Netherlands) Gräper Racing powered by FMA (Netherlands) DK-Racing powered by FMA	CUPRA León TCR	202	(Netherlands) René Steenmetz	SS1	All
(Netherlands) Ferry Monster Autosport (Netherlands) Gräper Racing powered by FMA (Netherlands) DK-Racing powered by FMA	CUPRA León TCR	250	(Netherlands) Oscar Gräper	SS1	All
(Netherlands) Ferry Monster Autosport (Netherlands) Gräper Racing powered by FMA (Netherlands) DK-Racing powered by FMA	CUPRA León TCR	250	(Netherlands) Henry Zumbrink	SS1	All
(Netherlands) Ferry Monster Autosport (Netherlands) Gräper Racing powered by FMA (Netherlands) DK-Racing powered by FMA	CUPRA León TCR	266	(Netherlands) Max Veels	SS1	4
(Netherlands) Ferry Monster Autosport (Netherlands) Gräper Racing powered by FMA (Netherlands) DK-Racing powered by FMA	Volkswagen Golf GTI TCR	264	(Belgium) Jonas de Kimpe	SS1	2, 4
(Netherlands) Ferry Monster Autosport (Netherlands) Gräper Racing powered by FMA (Netherlands) DK-Racing powered by FMA	Volkswagen Golf GTI TCR	264	(Netherlands) Priscilla Speelman	SS1	2, 4
(Netherlands) JR Motorsport	BMW M3 E92 V8	208	(Netherlands) Ted van Vliet	SS1	1–3
(Netherlands) JR Motorsport	BMW M3 E92 V8	208	(Netherlands) Michael Verhagen	SS1	1
(Netherlands) JR Motorsport	BMW M3 E92 V8	208	(Netherlands) Bert van der Zweerde	SS1	2–3
(Netherlands) Blueberry Raving	BMW M3 E46	222	(Netherlands) Luuk van Loon	SS1	2
(Netherlands) Blueberry Raving	BMW M3 E46	222	(Netherlands) Ronald van Loon	SS1	2
(Netherlands) Blueberry Raving	BMW M2 ClubSport Racing	373	(Netherlands) Berry van Elk	SS2	3
(Netherlands) Kool Racing	Honda Civic Type R TCR (FK2)	232	(Netherlands) Martijn Kool	SS1	1
(Netherlands) MWR Racing	BMW M3 E46	233	(Netherlands) Remco de Beus	SS1	2–4
(Netherlands) Certainty Racing Team	Audi RS3 LMS TCR	244	(Netherlands) Dillon Koster	SS1	4
(Netherlands) Certainty Racing Team	Audi RS3 LMS TCR	244	(Netherlands) Tim Schulte	SS1	4
(Netherlands) Euro Autosport Foundation	BMW M3 E92 V8	246	(Netherlands) Ruud Olij	SS1	All
(Austria) Trencar Racing	KTM X-Bow	247	(Austria) Bob Bau	SS1	2
(Netherlands) BS Racing Team	BMW M3 E46 GTR	259	(Netherlands) Marcel van de Maat	SS1	All
(Netherlands) Vos Racing	KTM X-Bow	283	(Netherlands) Gerrit Vos	SS1	2, 4
(Sweden) S60 Racing	Volvo S60 TSR	306	(Netherlands) Johan Hoogewerff	SS2	3
(Belgium) PK Carsport	BMW M2 ClubSport Racing	324	(Belgium) Peter Guelinckx	SS2	2
(Belgium) PK Carsport	BMW M2 ClubSport Racing	324	(Belgium) Stienes Longin	SS2	2
(Netherlands) Racing Team Tappel	BMW M3 E90	333	(Netherlands) Henk Tappel	SS2	3
(Netherlands) Racing Team Tappel	BMW M3 E90	333	(Netherlands) Harold Wisselink	SS2	3
(Netherlands) Racing Team Tappel	BMW 120d	403	(Netherlands) Henk Tappel	Sport	1
(Netherlands) DayVTec	BMW M2	347	(Netherlands) Jan Jaap van Roon	SS2	4
(Netherlands) DayVTec	BMW M2	348	(Netherlands) Tim Coronel	SS2	4
(Netherlands) DayVTec	BMW M2	348	(Netherlands) Gaby Uljee	SS2	4
(Belgium) Traxx Racing Team	Peugeot RCZ Cup	401	(Belgium) Bart van den Broeck	Sport	All
(Belgium) Traxx Racing Team	Peugeot RCZ Cup	401	(Belgium) Chris Voet	Sport	All
(Netherlands) Zilhouette Cup	BMW Z4 Zilhouette	404	(Netherlands) David Emaar	Sport	3–4
(Netherlands) Zilhouette Cup	BMW Z4 Zilhouette	410	(Netherlands) Mark Wieringa	Sport	All
(Netherlands) Zilhouette Cup	BMW Z4 Zilhouette	410	(Netherlands) Max Tubben	Sport	2
(Netherlands) Zilhouette Cup	BMW Z4 Zilhouette	461	(Netherlands) Max Tubben	Sport	3
(Netherlands) Zilhouette Cup	BMW Z4 Zilhouette	469	(Netherlands) Jan Berry Drenth	Sport	2–3
(Netherlands) Zilhouette Cup	BMW Z4 Zilhouette	469	(Netherlands) Martin West	Sport	2
(Netherlands) Zilhouette Cup	BMW Z4 Zilhouette	481	(Netherlands) Bernard Blaak	Sport	2–3
(Netherlands) Zilhouette Cup	BMW Z4 Zilhouette	481	(Netherlands) Lars Blaak	Sport	2–3
(Netherlands) Zilhouette Cup	BMW Z4 Zilhouette	496	(Netherlands) Marcel van der Lyke	Sport	1, 3
(Netherlands) Zilhouette Cup	BMW Z4 Zilhouette	498	(Netherlands) Jack Hokstra	Sport	2–3
(Netherlands) Zilhouette Cup	BMW Z4 Zilhouette	498	(Netherlands) Pieter de Jong	Sport	2–3
(Netherlands) Wagtmans Racing	Ford Focus Zilhouette	412	(Netherlands) Danny Wagtmans	Sport	1–3
(Ukraine) Protasov Racing	BMW M3 E46 Compact	460	(Ukraine) Volodymyr Drohomyretskyi	Sport	1
(Ukraine) Protasov Racing	BMW M3 E46 Compact	460	(Ukraine) Yevgen Rahkmaylov	Sport	1
(Ukraine) Protasov Racing	BMW M3 E46 Compact	460	(Ukraine) Leonid Protasov	Sport	2, 4
(Ukraine) Protasov Racing	BMW M3 E46 Compact	460	(Belgium) Sergio van Dyck	Sport	4

Icon	Class
GT	GT class
SS1	Supersport 1 class
SS2	Supersport 2 class
Sport	Sport class

== Race results ==
Round		Circuit	GT Winning Car	Supersport 1 Winning Car	Supersport 2 Winning Car	Sport Winning Car
Round		Circuit	GT Winning Drivers	Supersport 1 Winning Drivers	Supersport 2 Winning Drivers	Sport Winning Drivers
1	R1	(Netherlands) Zandvoort	(Netherlands) No. 140 JW Race Service	(Netherlands) No. 206 Koopman Racing	No entries	(Netherlands) No. 410 Zilhouette Cup
1	R1	(Netherlands) Zandvoort	(Netherlands) Huub van Eijndhoven	(Netherlands) Bart Arendsen	No entries	(Netherlands) Mark Wieringa
1	R2	(Netherlands) Zandvoort	(Netherlands) No. 106 BODA Racing	(Netherlands) No. 206 Koopman Racing	No entries	(Netherlands) No. 410 Zilhouette Cup
1	R2	(Netherlands) Zandvoort	(Netherlands) Bob Herber	(Netherlands) Bart Arendsen	No entries	(Netherlands) Mark Wieringa
2	R1	(Netherlands) Assen	(Belgium) No. 101 Speedlover	(Netherlands) No. 201 FEBO Racing Team	(Belgium) No. 324 PK Carsport	(Netherlands) No. 469 Zilhouette Cup
2	R1	(Netherlands) Assen	(Belgium) John de Wilde	(Netherlands) Dennis de Borst (Netherlands) Lorenzo van Riet	(Belgium) Peter Guelinckx (Belgium) Stienes Longin	(Netherlands) Jan Berry Drenth (Netherlands) Martin West
2	R2	(Netherlands) Assen	(Netherlands) No. 140 JW Race Service	(Netherlands) No. 222 Blueberry Racing	(Belgium) No. 324 PK Carsport	(Netherlands) No. 410 Zilhouette Cup
2	R2	(Netherlands) Assen	(Netherlands) Huub van Eijndhoven	(Netherlands) Luuk van Loon (Netherlands) Ronald van Loon	(Belgium) Peter Guelinckx (Belgium) Stienes Longin	(Netherlands) Mark Wieringa (Netherlands) Max Tubben
3	R1	(Netherlands) Assen	(Netherlands) No. 107 Johan Kraan Motorsport	(Netherlands) No. 206 Koopman Racing	(Netherlands) No. 373 Blueberry Racing	(Netherlands) No. 461 Zilhouette Cup
3	R1	(Netherlands) Assen	(Netherlands) Max Weering	(Netherlands) Bart Arendsen	(Netherlands) Berry van Elk	(Netherlands) Max Tubben
3	R2	(Netherlands) Assen	(Netherlands) No. 107 Johan Kraan Motorsport	(Netherlands) No. 250 Gräper Racing powered by FMA	(Netherlands) No. 373 Blueberry Racing	(Netherlands) No. 461 Zilhouette Cup
3	R2	(Netherlands) Assen	(Netherlands) Max Weering	(Netherlands) Oscar Gräper (Netherlands) Henry Zumbrink	(Netherlands) Berry van Elk	(Netherlands) Max Tubben
4	R1	(Netherlands) Zandvoort	(Netherlands) No. 106 BODA Racing	(Netherlands) No. 250 Gräper Racing powered by FMA	(Netherlands) No. 373 Blueberry Racing	(Netherlands) No. 410 Zilhouette Cup
4	R1	(Netherlands) Zandvoort	(Netherlands) Bob Herber	(Netherlands) Oscar Gräper (Netherlands) Henry Zumbrink	(Netherlands) Berry van Elk	(Netherlands) Mark Wieringa
4	R2	(Netherlands) Zandvoort	(Netherlands) No. 106 BODA Racing	(Netherlands) No. 206 Koopman Racing	(Netherlands) No. 348 DayVTec	(Netherlands) No. 410 Zilhouette Cup
4	R2	(Netherlands) Zandvoort	(Netherlands) Bob Herber	(Netherlands) Bart Arendsen	(Netherlands) Tim Coronel (Netherlands) Gaby Uljee	(Netherlands) Mark Wieringa

=== Drivers' championships ===
Position	**1st**	**2nd**	**3rd**	**4th**	**5th**	**6th**	**7th**	**8th**	**9th**	**10th**	**11th**	**Pole**
Points	23	20	17	15	13	11	9	7	5	3	1	1

==== GT ====
Pos.	Driver	Team	(Netherlands) ZAN1		(Netherlands) ASS1		(Netherlands) ASS2		(Netherlands) ZAN2		Points
1	(Belgium) John de Wilde	(Belgium) Speedlover	2	2	2	3	5	5			117
2	(Netherlands) Huub van Eijndhoven	(Netherlands) BODA Racing	1	3	**3**	2	7	7			110
3	(Netherlands) Hein Koopman	(Netherlands) Koopman Racing			4	22	6	6	2	2	104
4	(Netherlands) Bob Herber	(Netherlands) BODA Racing	**9**	1					**1**	1	88
5	(Netherlands) Max Weering	(Netherlands) Johan Kraan Motorsport					**3**	3			47
6	(Netherlands) Cor Euser	(Netherlands) Cor Euser Racing					4	4			40
7	(Netherlands) Daan Meijer	(Netherlands) BODA Racing	DNS	DNS					10	11	34
8	(Belgium) Kenneth Lenthout (Belgium) Mario Martlé	(Belgium) Total Plan Racing Team			12	DNS					15
–	(Netherlands) Jaap van Lagen	(Netherlands) BODA Racing	DNS	DNS							0
Pos.	Driver	Team	(Netherlands) ZAN1		(Netherlands) ASS1		(Netherlands) ASS2		(Netherlands) ZAN2		Points

==== Supersport ====
Pos.	Driver	Team	(Netherlands) ZAN1		(Netherlands) ASS1		(Netherlands) ASS2		(Netherlands) ZAN2		Points
Supersport 1
1	(Netherlands) Oscar Gräper (Netherlands) Henry Zumbrink	(Netherlands) Gräper Racing powered by FMA	6	7	6	9	9	8	3	7	142
2	(Netherlands) Dennis de Borst (Netherlands) Lorenzo van Riet	(Netherlands) FEBO Racing Team	**5**	8	**5**	5	**10**	10	**6**	8	139
3	(Netherlands) Bart Arendsen	(Netherlands) Koopman Racing	3	4	Ret	7	8	9	9	4	136
4	(Netherlands) René Steenmetz	(Netherlands) Ferry Monster Autosport	4	5	7	6	11	11	5	9	132
5	(Netherlands) Marcel van de Maat	(Netherlands) BS Racing Team	8	6	13	19	12	Ret	12	5	80
6	(Belgium) Jonas de Kimpe (Netherlands) Priscilla Speelman	(Netherlands) DK-Racing powered by FMA			8	8			4	10	57
7	(Netherlands) Ruud Olij	(Netherlands) Euro Autosport Foundation	7	16			Ret	Ret	8	12	40
8	(Netherlands) Remco de Beus	(Netherlands) MWR Racing			14	14	13	13	15	19	40
9	(Netherlands) Ted van Vliet	(Netherlands) JR Motorsport	6	7	DNS	11	Ret	12			40
10	(Netherlands) Luuk van Loon	(Netherlands) Blueberry Racing			10	4					36
11	(Netherlands) Max Veels	(Netherlands) Ferry Monster Autosport							7	6	30
12	(Austria) Bob Bau	(Austria) Trencar Racing			11	10					20
13	(Netherlands) Michael Verhagen	(Netherlands) JR Motorsport	6	7							20
14	(Netherlands) Bert van der Zweerde	(Netherlands) JR Motorsport			DNS	11	Ret	12			20
15	(Netherlands) Dillon Koster (Netherlands) Tim Schulte	(Netherlands) Certainty Racing Team							17	15	8
16	(Netherlands) Gerrit Vos	(Netherlands) Vos Racing			Ret	20			18	17	5
–	(Netherlands) Martijn Kool	(Netherlands) Kool Racing	DNS	DNS							0
Supersport 2
1	(Netherlands) Berry van Elk	(Netherlands) Blueberry Racing					18	14	**11**	21	87
2	(Netherlands) Tim Coronel (Netherlands) Gaby Uljee	(Netherlands) DayVTec							16	13	40
3	(Netherlands) Jan Jaap van Roon	(Netherlands) DayVTec							13	14	40
4	(Netherlands) Henk Tappel (Netherlands) Harold Wisselink	(Netherlands) Racing Team Tappel					**21**	Ret			21
5	(Netherlands) Johan Hoogewerff	(Sweden) S60 Racing					Ret	15			20
6	(Netherlands) Serge Huffmeijer	(Netherlands) JW Race Service							21	Ret	15
drivers ineligible to score points
	(Belgium) Peter Guelinckx (Belgium) Stienes Longin	(Belgium) PK Carsport			**15**	18					0
Pos.	Driver	Team	(Netherlands) ZAN1		(Netherlands) ASS1		(Netherlands) ASS2		(Netherlands) ZAN2		Points

Key
Colour	Result
Gold	Winner
Silver	Second place
Bronze	Third place
Green	Other points position
Blue	Other classified position
Blue	Not classified, finished (NC)
Purple	Not classified, retired (Ret)
Red	Did not qualify (DNQ)
Red	Did not pre-qualify (DNPQ)
Black	Disqualified (DSQ)
White	Did not start (DNS)
White	Race cancelled (C)
Blank	Did not practice (DNP)
Blank	Excluded (EX)
Blank	Did not arrive (DNA)
Blank	Withdrawn (WD)
Blank	Did not enter (cell empty)
Text formatting	Meaning
**Bold**	Pole position
Italics	Fastest lap

==== Sport ====
Pos.	Driver	Team	(Netherlands) ZAN1		(Netherlands) ASS1		(Netherlands) ASS2		(Netherlands) ZAN2		Points
1	(Netherlands) Mark Wieringa	(Netherlands) Zilhouette Cup	11	10	19	12	17	21	**14**	16	156
2	(Belgium) Bart van den Broeck (Belgium) Chris Voet	(Belgium) Traxx Racing Team	13	11	Ret	16	Ret	18	19	18	110
3	(Netherlands) Max Tubben	(Netherlands) Zilhouette Cup			19	12	14	16			84
4	(Netherlands) Danny Wagtmans	(Netherlands) Wagtmans Racing	**14**	12	**21**	15	20	22			82
5	(Netherlands) Jan Berry Drenth (Netherlands) Martin West	(Netherlands) Zilhouette Cup			16	13	19	17			76
6	(Netherlands) Jack Hokstra (Netherlands) Pieter de Jong	(Netherlands) Zilhouette Cup			17	17	15	19			68
7	(Netherlands) Bernard Blaak (Netherlands) Lars Blaak	(Netherlands) Zilhouette Cup			18	21	16	20			58
8	(Ukraine) Leonid Protasov	(Ukraine) Protasov Racing			20	DNS			22	22	45
9	(Netherlands) Marcel van der Lyke	(Netherlands) Zilhouette Cup	12	14			Ret	DNS			33
10	(Netherlands) David Emaar	(Netherlands) Zilhouette Cup					22	23	Ret	20	33
11	(Belgium) Sergio van Dyck	(Ukraine) Protasov Racing							22	22	32
12	(Netherlands) Henk Tappel	(Netherlands) Racing Team Tappel	15	13							28
13	(Ukraine) Volodymyr Drohomyretskyi (Ukraine) Yevgen Rahkmaylov	(Ukraine) Protasov Racing	16	15							22
14	(Netherlands) Estella van der Wiel	(Netherlands) Eljax Racing	Ret	Ret	DNS	DNS	**Ret**	Ret			1
15	(Netherlands) Jim Ringelberg	(Netherlands) Eljax Racing					**Ret**	Ret			1
–	(Netherlands) Tom van der Zwet	(Netherlands) Eljax Racing	Ret	Ret	DNS	DNS					0
Pos.	Driver	Team	(Netherlands) ZAN1		(Netherlands) ASS1		(Netherlands) ASS2		(Netherlands) ZAN2		Points

Key
Colour	Result
Gold	Winner
Silver	Second place
Bronze	Third place
Green	Other points position
Blue	Other classified position
Blue	Not classified, finished (NC)
Purple	Not classified, retired (Ret)
Red	Did not qualify (DNQ)
Red	Did not pre-qualify (DNPQ)
Black	Disqualified (DSQ)
White	Did not start (DNS)
White	Race cancelled (C)
Blank	Did not practice (DNP)
Blank	Excluded (EX)
Blank	Did not arrive (DNA)
Blank	Withdrawn (WD)
Blank	Did not enter (cell empty)
Text formatting	Meaning
**Bold**	Pole position
Italics	Fastest lap
