= 2018 Supercar Challenge =

Car racing competition

The 2018 Supercar Challenge powered by Hankook was the eighteenth season of the Supercar Challenge. It began at Circuit de Spa-Francorchamps 13 April and ended at TT Circuit Assen on 21 October.

== Calendar ==
| Round | Circuit | Date | Event | Notes |
|---|---|---|---|---|
| 1 | Circuit de Spa-Francorchamps, Belgium | 13–15 April | Spa Euro Races | Both races contested with cars from the GT & Prototype Challenge. |
| 2 | Circuit Zandvoort, Netherlands | 19–21 May | JUMBO Racing Day | |
| 3 | Circuit Zolder, Belgium | 29–30 June–1 July | Zolder Superprix | |
| 4 | Circuit Zandvoort, Netherlands | 13–15 July | | Supporting Deutsche Tourenwagen Masters, GT class contested both races with cars from the GT & Prototype Challenge. |
| 5 | TT Circuit Assen, Netherlands | 17–19 August | Gamma Racing Day | |
| 6 | Circuit de Spa-Francorchamps, Belgium | 28–30 September | Spa Racing Festival | Both races contested with cars from the GT & Prototype Challenge. |
| 7 | TT Circuit Assen, Netherlands | 19–21 October | Hankook Finale Races | GT class contested both races with cars from the GT & Prototype Challenge. |

== Entry list ==
| Team | Car | No. | Drivers | Class | Rounds |
|---|---|---|---|---|---|
| (Netherlands) Forze Hydrogen Electric Racing | Forze VIII | 8 | (Netherlands) Jan Bot | SP | 5 |
| (Netherlands) Forze Hydrogen Electric Racing | Forze VIII | 8 | (Netherlands) Leo van der Eijk | SP | 5 |
| (Netherlands) Cor Euser Racing | Marcos Mantis GT3 | 100 | (Netherlands) Cor Euser | GT | 4 |
| (Netherlands) Cor Euser Racing | BMW M3 E46 | 218 | (Netherlands) Cor Euser | SS1 | 2 |
| (Netherlands) Cor Euser Racing | BMW M3 E46 GTR | 318 | (Netherlands) Cor Euser | SS2 | 5 |
| (Netherlands) Cor Euser Racing | BMW M3 E46 GTR | 318 | (Netherlands) Cees Lubbers | SS2 | 5 |
| (Netherlands) BODA Racing | Porsche 991 GT3 Cup I 5 Porsche 991 GT3 Cup II 2 | 106 | (Netherlands) Bob Herber | GT | All |
| (Netherlands) BODA Racing | Porsche 991 GT3 Cup I 5 Porsche 991 GT3 Cup II 2 | 106 | (Netherlands) Daan Meijer | GT | 3 (R2) |
| (Netherlands) BODA Racing | Porsche 991 GT3 Cup I 3 Porsche 991 GT3 Cup II 4 | 107 | (Netherlands) Daan Meijer | GT | All |
| (Netherlands) BODA Racing | Porsche 991 GT3 Cup I 3 Porsche 991 GT3 Cup II 4 | 107 | (Netherlands) Jaap van Lagen | GT | 4 |
| (Netherlands) JR Motorsport | BMW M3 GTMR | 108 | (Netherlands) Martin Lanting | GT | 1–6 |
| (Netherlands) JR Motorsport | BMW M4 Silhouette | 111 | (Netherlands) Bas Schouten | GT | All |
| (Netherlands) JR Motorsport | BMW M4 Silhouette | 111 | (Belgium) Ward Sluys | GT | All |
| (Netherlands) JR Motorsport | BMW M4 Silhouette | 199 | (Netherlands) Willem Meijer | GT | All |
| (Netherlands) JR Motorsport | BMW M4 Silhouette | 199 | (Netherlands) Michael Verhagen | GT | All |
| (Netherlands) JR Motorsport | BMW M3 E92 V8 | 208 | (Netherlands) Ted van Vliet | SS1 | All |
| (Netherlands) JR Motorsport | BMW M3 E90 | 210 | (Netherlands) Fred Cavanagh | SS1 | 4 |
| (Netherlands) JR Motorsport | BMW M3 E90 | 210 | (Netherlands) Pieter van Soelen | SS1 | 4 |
| (Netherlands) Topper Team | Porsche 997 GT3 Cup | 109 | (Netherlands) Dirk Schulz | GT | 2, 4, 6 |
| (Netherlands) Topper Team | Porsche 996 GT3 Cup | 209 | (Netherlands) Jan Marc Schulz | SS1 | 2, 4 |
| (Netherlands) Lammertink Racing | Porsche 997 GT3 Cup | 116 | (Netherlands) Paul Sieljes | GT | 1–3 |
| (Netherlands) Certainty Racing Team | Porsche 991 GT3 Cup I | 118 | (Netherlands) Floris Dullaart | GT | 6–7 |
| (Netherlands) Certainty Racing Team | Porsche 991 GT3 Cup I | 118 | (Netherlands) Niels Langeveld | GT | 6 |
| (Netherlands) Certainty Racing Team | Audi RS 3 LMS TCR | 292 | (Netherlands) Dillon Koster | SS1 | 2, 4 |
| (Netherlands) Certainty Racing Team | Audi RS 3 LMS TCR | 292 | (Netherlands) Floris Dullaart | SS1 | 4 |
| (Netherlands) Certainty Racing Team | Renault Clio 1.6 Turbo | 450 | (Belgium) Lucas Groeneveld | SP | 2, 6 |
| (Netherlands) Dick Freebird | Porsche 991 GT3 Cup I | 121 | (Netherlands) Dick Freebird | GT | 2 |
| (Belgium) JJ Racing | Porsche 991 GT3 Cup I | 126 | (Belgium) Jos Jansen | GT | 1–3, 6–7 |
| (Austria) Trencar Racing | KTM X-Bow | 131 | (Austria) Bob Bau | GT | 1 |
| (Belgium) EMG Motorsport | Porsche 991 GT3 Cup II | 151 | (Netherlands) Patrick Lamster | GT | 1–2 |
| (Belgium) EMG Motorsport | Porsche 991 GT3 Cup II | 151 | (Netherlands) Wiebe Wijtzes | GT | 1–2 |
| (Netherlands) / Go Motorsports by DVB (Note: Cars No. 180 and 181 entered as Go Motorsports by DVB and car No. 182 entered as DVB Racing.); (Netherlands) / DVB Racing | Porsche 991 GT3 Cup I | 180 | (Turkey) Cenk Ceyisakar | GT | 1–6 |
| (Netherlands) / Go Motorsports by DVB; (Netherlands) / DVB Racing | Porsche 991 GT3 Cup I | 180 | (Belgium) Jeffrey van Hooydonk | GT | 5 |
| (Netherlands) / Go Motorsports by DVB; (Netherlands) / DVB Racing | Porsche 991 GT3 Cup I | 182 | (Belgium) Kris Wauters | GT | 1–4, 6–7 |
| (Netherlands) / Go Motorsports by DVB; (Netherlands) / DVB Racing | Porsche 991 GT3 Cup I | 182 | (Belgium) Koen Wauters | GT | 1–4, 6 |
| (Netherlands) / Go Motorsports by DVB; (Netherlands) / DVB Racing | Porsche 991 GT3 Cup I | 181 | (Turkey) Cengiz Oguzhan | GT | 1–2, 4–6 |
| (Belgium) Speedlover | Porsche 991 GT3 Cup I | 186 | (Belgium) Willem Meulders | GT | 1–4, 6 |
| (Belgium) Speedlover | Porsche 991 GT3 Cup I | 186 | (Belgium) Rik Renmans | GT | 1–4, 6 |
| (Belgium) Speedlover | Porsche 991 GT3 Cup I | 187 | (Belgium) Vincent Despriet | GT | 1–2, 5–6 |
| (Belgium) Speedlover | Porsche 991 GT3 Cup I 6 Porsche 991 GT3 Cup II 1 | 188 | (Belgium) John de Wilde | GT | All |
| (Belgium) Speedlover | Porsche 991 GT3 Cup II 1 Porsche 991 GT3 Cup I 1 | 189 | (Netherlands) Roger Grouwels | GT | 1–2 |
| (Belgium) Speedlover | Porsche 991 GT3 Cup II 1 Porsche 991 GT3 Cup I 1 | 189 | (Netherlands) Henry Zumbrink | GT | 2 |
| (Netherlands) Team RaceArt | Porsche 991 GT3 Cup II | 189 | (Netherlands) Roger Grouwels | GT | 5–6 |
| (Netherlands) Team RaceArt | Porsche 991 GT3 Cup II | 190 | (Netherlands) Edwards Grouwels | GT | 5–6 |
| (Netherlands) Team RaceArt | Porsche 991 GT3 Cup II | 191 | (Netherlands) Bas Barenbrug | GT | 5 |
| (Netherlands) FEBO Racing Team | Cupra León TCR | 201 | (Netherlands) Dennis de Borst | SS1 | All |
| (Netherlands) FEBO Racing Team | Cupra León TCR | 201 | (Netherlands) Stan van Oord | SS1 | All |
| (Netherlands) / Ferry Monster Autosport (Note: Cars no. 202, 203 and 204 were entered as Ferry Monster Autosport and car no. 264 was entered as DK-Racing powered by FMA.); (Netherlands) / DK-Racing powered by FMA | Cupra León TCR | 202 | (Netherlands) René Steenmetz | SS1 | All |
| (Netherlands) / Ferry Monster Autosport; (Netherlands) / DK-Racing powered by FMA | Cupra León TCR | 203 | (Netherlands) Stephan Polderman | SS1 | 3, 6 |
| (Netherlands) / Ferry Monster Autosport; (Netherlands) / DK-Racing powered by FMA | Cupra León TCR | 204 | (Netherlands) Tony Vijfschaft | SS1 | 5 |
| (Netherlands) / Ferry Monster Autosport; (Netherlands) / DK-Racing powered by FMA | Volkswagen Golf GTI TCR | 264 | (Belgium) Jonas de Kimpe | SS1 | 1–2, 5–7 |
| (Netherlands) / Ferry Monster Autosport; (Netherlands) / DK-Racing powered by FMA | Volkswagen Golf GTI TCR | 264 | (Netherlands) Priscilla Speelman | SS1 | 5–7 |
| (Netherlands) Blueberry Raving | BMW M3 E46 | 222 | (Netherlands) Luuk van Loon | SS1 | All |
| (Netherlands) Blueberry Raving | BMW M3 E46 | 222 | (Netherlands) Ronald van Loon | SS1 | All |
| (United Kingdom) West Suffolk Racing | BMW M3 E36 | 224 | (United Kingdom) Oliver Taylor | SS1 | 1–2 |
| (Netherlands) HBR Motorsport | BMW M3 E90 | 245 | (Netherlands) Benjamin van den Berg | SS1 | All |
| (Netherlands) HBR Motorsport | BMW M3 E90 | 245 | (Netherlands) Robert van den Berg | SS1 | All |
| (Netherlands) Euro Autosport Foundation | BMW M3 E92 V8 | 246 | (Netherlands) Ruud Olij | SS1 | 1–6 |
| (Netherlands) Bas Koeten Racing | Audi RS 3 LMS TCR | 250 | (Netherlands) Oscar Gräper | SS1 | 7 |
| (Netherlands) Bas Koeten Racing | SEAT Ibiza SC Trophy | 445 | (Netherlands) Oscar Gräper | SP | 2 |
| (Netherlands) BS Racing Team | BMW M3 E46 GTR | 259 | (Netherlands) Peter Schreurs | SS1 | All |
| (Netherlands) BS Racing Team | BMW M3 E46 GTR | 259 | (Netherlands) Marcel van de Maat | SS1 | All |
| (Netherlands) Van der Kooi Racing | Lotus Exige S3 | 262 | (Netherlands) Roelant de Waard | SS1 | 1–4 |
| (Netherlands) Van der Kooi Racing | Lotus Exige S2 | 263 | (Netherlands) Jan van der Kooi | SS1 | 1–5 |
| (Netherlands) Van der Kooi Racing | Lotus Exige S2 | 263 | (Netherlands) Priscilla Speelman | SS1 | 1–4 |
| (Netherlands) JW Race Service | SEAT León Cup Racer | 266 | (Netherlands) Max Veels | SS1 | All |
| (Netherlands) JW Race Service | SEAT León Cup Racer | 266 | (Netherlands) Jack van der Ende | SS1 | All |
| (Netherlands) JW Race Service | Volkswagen Golf | 466 | (Netherlands) Dilango de Vos | SP | 2 |
| (Netherlands) JW Race Service | Volkswagen Golf | 466 | (Netherlands) Dmitri de Vos | SP | 2 |
| (Belgium) Why Not Pitstop Racing Events | Peugeot 308 Racing Cup | 281 | (Belgium) Nicolas Delencre | SS1 | 1 |
| (Belgium) Why Not Pitstop Racing Events | Peugeot 308 Racing Cup | 381 | (Belgium) Nicolas Delencre | SS2 | 2–7 |
| (Netherlands) Peter Stox Racing | BMW M3 GT4 | 299 | (Netherlands) Peter Stox | SS1 | 5 |
| (Netherlands) DRDO | BMW M3 E46 | 318 | (Netherlands) Cor Euser | SS2 | 6–7 |
| (Netherlands) DRDO | BMW M3 E46 | 321 | (Netherlands) Rover Dullaart | SS2 | 6 |
| (Netherlands) DRDO | BMW M3 E46 | 322 | (Netherlands) Daan Dullaart | SS2 | 6 |
| (Netherlands) DRDO | BMW M3 E46 | 322 | (Netherlands) Sander Dullaart | SS2 | 6 |
| (Netherlands) DRDO | BMW M3 E46 | 323 | (Netherlands) Emile Drummen | SS2 | 6 |
| (Netherlands) DRDO | BMW M3 E46 | 323 | (Netherlands) Ronald Friederich | SS2 | 6 |
| (Netherlands) DRDO | BMW M3 GTR | 327 | (Netherlands) Peter van der Helm | SS2 | 6 |
| (Netherlands) DRDO | BMW Compact GTR | 324 | (Netherlands) Jaxon Verhoeven | SS2 | 6 |
| (Netherlands) DRDO | BMW Compact GTR | 324 | (Netherlands) Jean-Pierre Verhoeven | SS2 | 6 |
| (Netherlands) DRDO | BMW 130i | 325 | (Netherlands) Jan Willem van Stee | SS2 | 6 |
| (Netherlands) DRDO | BMW 130i | 326 | (Netherlands) André Seinen | SS2 | 6 |
| (Netherlands) DRDO | BMW M3 E36 | 409 | (Netherlands) Hans Creemers | SP | 6 |
| (Netherlands) DRDO | BMW M3 E36 | 409 | (Netherlands) Raimond van Steen | SP | 6 |
| (Netherlands) DRDO | Mazda MX-5 | 411 | (Netherlands) Han Kolenaar | SP | 6 |
| (Netherlands) Koopman Racing | SEAT León Supercopa Mk2 | 341 | (Netherlands) Berry Arendsen | SS2 | 2, 5 |
| (Netherlands) Koopman Racing | BMW 1 Series GTR | 342 | (Netherlands) Bart Arendsen | SS2 | 2, 5 |
| (Netherlands) Koopman Racing | BMW 1 Series GTR | 342 | (Netherlands) Joop Arendsen | SS2 | 2, 5 |
| (Netherlands) Koopman Racing | BMW M3 GTR | 343 | (Netherlands) Marco Dijkhuis | SS2 | 2 |
| (Netherlands) Koopman Racing | BMW Compact GTR | 345 | (Netherlands) Peter Koelewijn | SS2 | 2 |
| (Netherlands) Koopman Racing | BMW M3 | 346 | (Netherlands) René Snel | SS2 | 6 |
| (Netherlands) Koopman Racing | BMW M3 E46 | 347 | (Netherlands) Cees van Duijn | SS2 | 6 |
| (Netherlands) Koopman Racing | BMW M3 E46 | 347 | (Netherlands) Floris van Duijn | SS2 | 6 |
| (Netherlands) Koopman Racing | BMW M3 E46 | 347 | (Netherlands) Tristan van Duijn | SS2 | 6 |
| (Netherlands) Brightfiber Glaszevel Promotion Team | BMW M3 E46 | 355 | (Netherlands) Rogier de Leeuw | SS2 | All |
| (Netherlands) Brightfiber Glaszevel Promotion Team | BMW M3 E46 | 355 | (Netherlands) Patrick de Vreede | SS2 | All |
| (Netherlands) MWR Racing | BMW M3 E36 | 356 | (Netherlands) Remco de Beus | SS2 | 2, 4, 7 |
| (United Kingdom) Ricci Concept | SEAT León Supercopa Mk1 | 373 | (United Kingdom) Nick Sanderson | SS2 | 3–4 |
| (Belgium) Traxx Racing Team | Peugeot RCZ Cup | 401 | (Belgium) Bart van den Broeck | SP | All |
| (Belgium) Traxx Racing Team | Peugeot RCZ Cup | 401 | (Belgium) Chris Voet | SP | All |
| (Netherlands) Spirit Racing | Renault Clio Cup RS | 402 | (Netherlands) Rob Nieman | SP | All |
| (Netherlands) Spirit Racing | Renault Clio Cup RS | 402 | (Netherlands) Joey van Splunteren | SP | 6 (R1) |
| (Netherlands) Spirit Racing | Renault Clio Cup RS | 499 | (Netherlands) Joey van Splunteren | SP | 6–7 |
| (Netherlands) Spirit Racing | Renault Clio 1.6 Turbo | 404 | (Netherlands) Bart Drost | SP | All |
| (Netherlands) Kustlicht | Alfa Romeo 147 | 403 | (Netherlands) Sandra van der Sloot | SP | All |
| (Netherlands) Kustlicht | Alfa Romeo 147 | 403 | (Netherlands) John van der Voort | SP | All |
| (Netherlands) Racing Team Tappel | BMW Z4 Zilhouette | 405 | (Netherlands) Henk Tappel | SP | 1–2, 4–7 |
| (Netherlands) Racing Team Tappel | BMW Z4 Zilhouette | 405 | (Netherlands) Harold Wisselink | SP | 2, 4, 7 |
| (Netherlands) RDS Racing | Renault Clio Cup RS | 444 | (Netherlands) Pascal Ehlert | SP | All |

| Icon | Class |
|---|---|
| GT | GT class |
| SS1 | Supersport 1 class |
| SS2 | Supersport 2 class |
| SP | Sport class |

== Race results ==
Bold indicates overall winner.

| Round | | Circuit | GT Winning Car | Supersport 1 Winning Car | Supersport 2 Winning Car | Sport Winning Car |
| Round | | Circuit | GT Winning Drivers | Supersport 1 Winning Drivers | Supersport 2 Winning Drivers | Sport Winning Drivers |
|---|---|---|---|---|---|---|
| 1 | R1 | (Belgium) Spa-Francorchamps | **(Belgium) No. 188 Speedlover** | (Netherlands) No. 201 FEBO Racing Team | (Netherlands) No. 355 Brightfiber Glaszevel Promotion Team | (Belgium) No. 401 Traxx Racing Team |
| 1 | R1 | (Belgium) Spa-Francorchamps | **(Belgium) John de Wilde** | (Netherlands) Dennis de Borst (Netherlands) Stan van Oord | (Netherlands) Rogier de Leeuw (Netherlands) Patrick de Vreede | (Belgium) Bart van den Broeck (Belgium) Chris Voet |
| 1 | R2 | (Belgium) Spa-Francorchamps | **(Netherlands) No. 111 JR Motorsport** | (Netherlands) No. 202 Ferry Monster Autosport | (Netherlands) No. 355 Brightfiber Glaszevel Promotion Team | (Netherlands) No. 403 Kustlicht |
| 1 | R2 | (Belgium) Spa-Francorchamps | **(Belgium) Ward Sluys** **(Netherlands) Bas Schouten** | (Netherlands) René Steenmetz | (Netherlands) Rogier de Leeuw (Netherlands) Patrick de Vreede | (Netherlands) Sandra van der Sloot (Netherlands) John van der Voort |
| 2 | R1 | (Netherlands) Zandvoort | **(Netherlands) No. 199 JR Motorsport** | (Netherlands) No. 259 BS Racing Team | (Netherlands) No. 342 Koopman Racing | (Netherlands) No. 402 Spirit Racing |
| 2 | R1 | (Netherlands) Zandvoort | **(Netherlands) Willem Meijer** **(Netherlands) Michael Verhagen** | (Netherlands) Peter Schreurs (Netherlands) Marcel van de Maat | (Netherlands) Bart Arendsen (Netherlands) Joop Arendsen | (Netherlands) Rob Nieman |
| 2 | R2 | (Netherlands) Zandvoort | **(Belgium) No. 188 Speedlover** | (Netherlands) No. 202 Ferry Monster Autosport | (Netherlands) No. 343 Koopman Racing | (Belgium) No. 401 Traxx Racing Team |
| 2 | R2 | (Netherlands) Zandvoort | **(Belgium) John de Wilde** | (Netherlands) René Steenmetz | (Netherlands) Marco Dijkhuis | (Belgium) Bart van den Broeck (Belgium) Chris Voet |
| 3 | R1 | (Belgium) Zolder | **(Netherlands) No. 111 JR Motorsport** | (Netherlands) No. 259 BS Racing Team | (Netherlands) No. 355 Brightfiber Glaszevel Promotion Team | (Netherlands) No. 402 Spirit Racing |
| 3 | R1 | (Belgium) Zolder | **(Belgium) Ward Sluys** **(Netherlands) Bas Schouten** | (Netherlands) Peter Schreurs (Netherlands) Marcel van de Maat | (Netherlands) Rogier de Leeuw (Netherlands) Patrick de Vreede | (Netherlands) Rob Nieman |
| 3 | R2 | (Belgium) Zolder | **(Netherlands) No. 111 JR Motorsport** | (Netherlands) No. 222 Blueberry Racing | (Netherlands) No. 355 Brightfiber Glaszevel Promotion Team | (Belgium) No. 401 Traxx Racing Team |
| 3 | R2 | (Belgium) Zolder | **(Belgium) Ward Sluys** **(Netherlands) Bas Schouten** | (Netherlands) Luuk van Loon (Netherlands) Ronald van Loon | (Netherlands) Rogier de Leeuw (Netherlands) Patrick de Vreede | (Belgium) Bart van den Broeck (Belgium) Chris Voet |
| 4 | R1 | (Netherlands) Zandvoort | **(Netherlands) No. 180 Go Motorsports by DVB** | (Netherlands) No. 201 FEBO Racing Team | (Netherlands) No. 355 Brightfiber Glaszevel Promotion Team | (Netherlands) No. 402 Spirit Racing |
| 4 | R1 | (Netherlands) Zandvoort | **(Turkey) Cenk Ceyisakar** | (Netherlands) Dennis de Borst (Netherlands) Stan van Oord | (Netherlands) Rogier de Leeuw (Netherlands) Patrick de Vreede | (Netherlands) Rob Nieman |
| 4 | R2 | (Netherlands) Zandvoort | **(Netherlands) No. 199 JR Motorsport** | (Netherlands) No. 202 Ferry Monster Autosport | (Belgium) No. 381 Why Not Pitstop Racing Events | (Netherlands) No. 402 Spirit Racing |
| 4 | R2 | (Netherlands) Zandvoort | **(Netherlands) Willem Meijer** **(Netherlands) Michael Verhagen** | (Netherlands) René Steenmetz | (Belgium) Nicolas Delencre | (Netherlands) Rob Nieman |
| 5 | R1 | (Netherlands) Assen | **(Netherlands) No. 107 BODA Racing** | (Netherlands) No. 201 FEBO Racing Team | (Netherlands) No. 355 Brightfiber Glaszevel Promotion Team | (Netherlands) No. 405 Racing Team Tappel |
| 5 | R1 | (Netherlands) Assen | **(Netherlands) Daan Meijer** | (Netherlands) Dennis de Borst (Netherlands) Stan van Oord | (Netherlands) Rogier de Leeuw (Netherlands) Patrick de Vreede | (Netherlands) Henk Tappel |
| 5 | R2 | (Netherlands) Assen | **(Belgium) No. 188 Speedlover** | (Netherlands) No. 201 FEBO Racing Team | (Netherlands) No. 342 Koopman Racing | (Netherlands) No. 405 Racing Team Tappel |
| 5 | R2 | (Netherlands) Assen | **(Belgium) John de Wilde** | (Netherlands) Dennis de Borst (Netherlands) Stan van Oord | (Netherlands) Bart Arendsen (Netherlands) Joop Arendsen | (Netherlands) Henk Tappel |
| 6 | R1 | (Belgium) Spa-Francorchamps | **(Netherlands) No. 111 JR Motorsport** | (Netherlands) No. 246 Euro Autosport Foundation | (Netherlands) No. 346 Koopman Racing | (Netherlands) No. 402 Spirit Racing |
| 6 | R1 | (Belgium) Spa-Francorchamps | **(Belgium) Ward Sluys** **(Netherlands) Bas Schouten** | (Netherlands) Ruud Olij | (Netherlands) René Snel | (Netherlands) Rob Nieman (Netherlands) Joey van Splunteren |
| 6 | R2 | (Belgium) Spa-Francorchamps | **(Netherlands) No. 199 JR Motorsport** | (Netherlands) No. 202 Ferry Monster Autosport | (Belgium) No. 381 Why Not Pitstop Racing Events | (Belgium) No. 401 Traxx Racing Team |
| 6 | R2 | (Belgium) Spa-Francorchamps | **(Netherlands) Willem Meijer** **(Netherlands) Michael Verhagen** | (Netherlands) René Steenmetz | (Belgium) Nicolas Delencre | (Belgium) Bart van den Broeck (Belgium) Chris Voet |
| 7 | R1 | (Netherlands) Assen | **(Netherlands) No. 111 JR Motorsport** | (Netherlands) No. 266 JW Race Service | (Netherlands) No. 356 MWR Racing | (Netherlands) No. 405 Racing Team Tappel |
| 7 | R1 | (Netherlands) Assen | **(Belgium) Ward Sluys** **(Netherlands) Bas Schouten** | (Netherlands) Max Veels (Netherlands) Jack van der Ende | (Netherlands) Remco de Beus | (Netherlands) Henk Tappel (Netherlands) Harold Wisselink |
| 7 | R2 | (Netherlands) Assen | **(Belgium) No. 188 Speedlover** | (Netherlands) No. 201 FEBO Racing Team | (Netherlands) No. 355 Brightfiber Glaszevel Promotion Team | (Netherlands) No. 499 Spirit Racing |
| 7 | R2 | (Netherlands) Assen | **(Belgium) John de Wilde** | (Netherlands) Dennis de Borst (Netherlands) Stan van Oord | (Netherlands) Rogier de Leeuw (Netherlands) Patrick de Vreede | (Netherlands) Joey van Splunteren |

== Championship standings ==
| Position | **1st** | **2nd** | **3rd** | **4th** | **5th** | **6th** | **7th** | **8th** | **9th** | **10th** | **11th** | **Pole** |
| Points | 23 | 20 | 17 | 15 | 13 | 11 | 9 | 7 | 5 | 3 | 1 | 1 |

| Pos. | Driver | Team | (Belgium) SPA | | (Netherlands) ZAN | | (Belgium) ZOL | | (Netherlands) ZAN | | (Netherlands) ASS | | (Belgium) SPA | | (Netherlands) ASS | | Points |
GT
| 1 | (Netherlands) Willem Meijer (Netherlands) Michael Verhagen | (Netherlands) JR Motorsport | 10 | 6 | 1 | 2 | 7 | 3 | Ret | 5 | 8 | Ret | **10** | 6 | **6** | 3 | 207 |
| 2 | (Netherlands) Bob Herber | (Netherlands) BODA Racing | 7 | 11 | 7 | 4 | 4 | 7 | 6 | 11 | 2 | 25 | 8 | 16 | 5 | 5 | 196 |
| 3 | (Belgium) John de Wilde | (Belgium) Speedlover | 5 | Ret | 15 | 1 | 3 | 5 | 7 | 9 | 5 | 1 | 15 | 12 | 9 | 2 | 195 |
| 4 | (Belgium) Ward Sluys (Netherlands) Bas Schouten | (Netherlands) JR Motorsport | **11** | 3 | **Ret** | Ret | **1** | 1 | 12 | 6 | **9** | 16 | 6 | 14 | 3 | Ret | 180 |
| 5 | (Turkey) Cenk Ceyisakar | (Netherlands) Go Motorsports by DVB | 9 | 18 | 2 | 3 | 5 | 6 | 5 | 10 | 10 | 3 | 13 | 11 | | | 154 |
| 6 | (Netherlands) Roger Grouwels | (Belgium) Speedlover | 6 | 38 | 4 | 5 | | | | | | | | | | | 111 |
| 6 | (Netherlands) Roger Grouwels | (Netherlands) Team RaceArt | | | | | | | | | 3 | 4 | 12 | 7 | | | 111 |
| 7 | (Netherlands) Daan Meijer | (Netherlands) BODA Racing | 8 | 10 | 8 | 28 | Ret | 7 | **9** | 16 | 1 | Ret | 11 | 15 | WD | WD | 103 |
| 8 | (Netherlands) Martin Lanting | (Netherlands) JR Motorsport | DNS | 14 | 11 | 18 | 8 | 9 | 10 | 12 | 6 | 14 | 14 | 11 | | | 89 |
| 9 | (Belgium) Jos Jansen | (Belgium) JJ Racing | 16 | 13 | 3 | 35 | 6 | 4 | | | | | 49 | 13 | 7 | 8 | 86 |
| 10 | (Belgium) Kris Wauters | (Netherlands) DVB Racing | Ret | 9 | Ret | Ret | 2 | 2 | Ret | Ret | | | 50 | Ret | 11 | 7 | 77 |
| 10 | (Belgium) Koen Wauters | (Netherlands) DVB Racing | Ret | 9 | Ret | Ret | 2 | 2 | Ret | Ret | | | 50 | Ret | | | 77 |
| 11 | (Netherlands) Edward Grouwels | (Netherlands) Team RaceArt | | | | | | | | | 4 | Ret | 9 | 8 | | | 49 |
| 12 | (Belgium) Jeffrey van Hooydonk | (Netherlands) Go Motorsports by DVB | | | | | | | | | 10 | 3 | 13 | 10 | | | 49 |
| 13 | (Netherlands) Patrick Lamster (Netherlands) Wiebe Wijtzes | (Belgium) EMG Motorsport | 13 | 8 | 10 | 7 | | | | | | | | | | | 44 |
| 14 | (Netherlands) Cor Euser | (Netherlands) Cor Euser Racing | | | | | | | 8 | 8 | | | | | | | 32 |
| 15 | (Netherlands) Floris Dullaart | (Netherlands) Certainty Racing Team | | | | | | | | | | | 16 | 17 | 8 | 6 | 32 |
| 16 | (Netherlands) Paul Sieljes | (Netherlands) Lammertink Racing | 19 | 20 | 6 | 14 | 16 | 8 | | | | | | | | | 30 |
| 17 | (Netherlands) Bas Barenbrug | (Netherlands) Team RaceArt | | | | | | | | | 7 | 2 | | | | | 29 |
| 18 | (Netherlands) Henry Zumbrink | (Belgium) Speedlover | | | 4 | 5 | | | | | | | | | | | 28 |
| 19 | (Belgium) Vincent Despriet | (Belgium) Speedlover | 15 | 12 | 19 | 6 | | | | | 11 | Ret | DNS | DNS | | | 24 |
| 20 | (Turkey) Cengiz Oguzhan | (Netherlands) Go Motorsports by DVB | Ret | 15 | DNS | DNS | | | 13 | 14 | 14 | Ret | 18 | 32 | | | 18 |
| 21 | (Netherlands) Jaap van Lagen | (Netherlands) BODA Racing | | | | | | | **9** | 16 | | | | | | | 17 |
| 22 | (Belgium) Willem Meulders (Belgium) Rik Renmans | (Belgium) Speedlover | 14 | 16 | Ret | 17 | 26 | Ret | Ret | Ret | | | 22 | 19 | | | 14 |
| 23 | (Netherlands) Dick Freebird | (Netherlands) Dick Freebird | | | 5 | Ret | | | | | | | | | | | 13 |
| 24 | (Netherlands) Dirk Schulz | (Netherlands) Topper Team | | | Ret | 33 | | | 14 | 15 | | | 31 | Ret | | | 10 |
| 25 | (Netherlands) Niels Langeveld | (Netherlands) Certainty Racing Team | | | | | | | | | | | 16 | 17 | | | 4 |
| 26 | (Austria) Bob Bau | (Austria) Trencar Racing | 27 | 40 | | | | | | | | | | | | | 0 |
Supersport 1
| 1 | (Netherlands) Dennis de Borst (Netherlands) Stan van Oord | (Netherlands) FEBO Racing Team | **17** | 21 | **29** | 12 | **10** | 12 | 1 | 2 | **12** | 5 | **23** | Ret | **6** | 1 | 242 |
| 2 | (Netherlands) René Steenmetz | (Netherlands) Ferry Monster Autosport | 20 | 19 | 16 | 8 | 14 | 13 | **3** | 1 | 21 | Ret | 21 | 20 | 2 | 2 | 228 |
| 3 | (Netherlands) Peter Schreurs (Netherlands) Marcel van de Maat | (Netherlands) BS Racing Team | 22 | 24 | 9 | Ret | 9 | 11 | 4 | 3 | 17 | 7 | 26 | 22 | Ret | 12 | 195 |
| 4 | (Netherlands) Benjamin van den Berg (Netherlands) Robert van den Berg | (Netherlands) HBR Motorsport | 18 | 23 | 13 | 9 | 12 | Ret | 5 | 17 | 15 | 9 | Ret | 23 | 3 | 4 | 178 |
| 5 | (Belgium) Jonas de Kimpe | (Netherlands) DK-Racing powered by FMA | 23 | 25 | 17 | 10 | | | | | 16 | 6 | 20 | 21 | 4 | 3 | 159 |
| 6 | (Netherlands) Max Veels (Netherlands) Jack van der Ende | (Netherlands) JW Race Service | 24 | 30 | 12 | 11 | 19 | 25 | 6 | 4 | 13 | 8 | Ret | 28 | 1 | Ret | 148 |
| 7 | (Netherlands) Priscilla Speelman | (Netherlands) Van der Kooi Racing | Ret | 27 | Ret | 24 | 15 | 16 | Ret | 6 | | | | | | | 146 |
| 7 | (Netherlands) Priscilla Speelman | (Netherlands) DK-Racing powered by FMA | | | | | | | | | 16 | 6 | 20 | 21 | 4 | 3 | 146 |
| 8 | (Netherlands) Luuk van Loon (Netherlands) Ronald van Loon | (Netherlands) Blueberry Racing | Ret | 22 | Ret | 13 | 25 | 10 | 9 | 5 | 18 | 10 | 25 | 26 | 13 | DNS | 123 |
| 9 | (Netherlands) Ruud Olij | (Netherlands) Euro Autosport Foundation | Ret | 32 | Ret | 25 | 11 | 19 | 2 | 12 | 20 | Ret | 19 | 24 | | | 92 |
| 10 | (Netherlands) Ted van Vliet | (Netherlands) JR Motorsport | 25 | 41 | 24 | 21 | 13 | 23 | 12 | 10 | Ret | 13 | 29 | 29 | 7 | 5 | 87 |
| 11 | (Netherlands) Stephan Polderman | (Netherlands) Ferry Monster Autosport | | | | | 17 | 14 | | | | | 28 | | | | 40 |
| 12 | (Netherlands) Jan van der Kooi | (Netherlands) Van der Kooi Racing | Ret | 27 | Ret | 24 | 15 | 16 | Ret | 6 | Ret | Ret | | | | | 39 |
| 13 | (Netherlands) Cor Euser | (Netherlands) Cor Euser Racing | | | 14 | 16 | | | | | | | | | | | 22 |
| 14 | (Netherlands) Dillon Koster | (Netherlands) Certainty Racing Team | | | 20 | 15 | | | 10 | 18 | | | | | | | 21 |
| 15 | (Netherlands) Roelant de Waard | (Netherlands) Van der Kooi Racing | Ret | Ret | Ret | Ret | Ret | 15 | | | | | | | | | 18 |
| 16 | (Netherlands) Fred Cavanagh (Netherlands) Pieter van Soelen | (Netherlands) JR Motorsport | | | | | | | 7 | 7 | | | | | | | 18 |
| 17 | (Belgium) Nicolas Delencre | (Belgium) Why Not Pitstop Racing Events | 26 | 26 | | | | | | | | | | | | | 16 |
| 18 | (Netherlands) Tony Vijfschaft | (Netherlands) Ferry Monster Autosport | | | | | | | | | 19 | 15 | | | | | 16 |
| 19 | (Netherlands) Oscar Gräper | (Netherlands) Bas Koeten Racing | | | | | | | | | | | | | 5 | Ret | 13 |
| 20 | (Netherlands) Jan Marc Schulz | (Netherlands) Topper Team | | | 33 | 27 | | | 11 | 10 | | | | | | | 11 |
| 21 | (United Kingdom) Ollie Taylor | (United Kingdom) West Suffolk Racing | 28 | 28 | Ret | Ret | | | | | | | | | | | 11 |
| 22 | (Netherlands) Peter Stox | (Netherlands) Peter Stox Racing | | | | | | | | | Ret | 17 | | | | | 5 |
| 23 | (Netherlands) Floris Dullaart | (Netherlands) Certainty Racing Team | | | | | | 10 | 18 | | | | | | | | 3 |
Supersport 2
| 1 | (Netherlands) Rogier de Leeuw (Netherlands) Patrick de Vreede | (Netherlands) Brightfiber Glaszevel Promotion Team | **30** | 35 | 22 | 37 | **18** | 17 | 13 | Ret | 22 | 18 | Ret | 23 | **17** | 6 | 244 |
| 2 | (Belgium) Nicolas Delencre | (Belgium) Why Not Pitstop Racing Events | | | 21 | 22 | Ret | 22 | **Ret** | 8 | 24 | Ret | 32 | 30 | Ret | Ret | 141 |
| 3 | (Netherlands) Cor Euser | (Netherlands) Cor Euser Racing | | | | | | | | | 25 | 12 | | | | | 109 |
| 3 | (Netherlands) Cor Euser | (Netherlands) DRDO | | | | | | | | | | | 34 | 34 | 16 | 7 | 109 |
| 4 | (Netherlands) Remco de Beus | (Netherlands) MWR Racing | | | 34 | 23 | | | 14 | 11 | | | | | 15 | Ret | 89 |
| 5 | (Netherlands) Bart Arendsen (Netherlands) Joop Arendsen | (Netherlands) Koopman Racing | | | **18** | 26 | | | | | **23** | 11 | | | | | 81 |
| 6 | (Netherlands) Berry Arendsen | (Netherlands) Koopman Racing | | | 31 | 29 | | | | | 30 | 23 | | | | | 52 |
| 7 | (Netherlands) Marco Dijkhuis | (Netherlands) Koopman Racing | | | 23 | 19 | | | | | | | | | | | 38 |
| 8 | (Netherlands) Cees Lubbers | (Netherlands) Cor Euser Racing | | | | | | | | | 25 | 12 | | | | | 35 |
| 9 | (Netherlands) René Snel | (Netherlands) Koopman Racing | | | | | | | | | | | **30** | 50 | | | 29 |
| 10 | (Netherlands) Rover Dullaart | (Netherlands) DRDO | | | | | | | | | | | 36 | 36 | | | 28 |
| 11 | (Netherlands) Emile Drummen (Netherlands) Ronald Friederich | (Netherlands) DRDO | | | | | | | | | | | 40 | 35 | | | 28 |
| 12 | (Netherlands) Jaxon Verhoeven (Netherlands) Jean-Pierre Verhoeven | (Netherlands) DRDO | | | | | | | | | | | 41 | 41 | | | 22 |
| 13 | (Netherlands) Peter Koelewijn | (Netherlands) Koopman Racing | | | Ret | 20 | | | | | | | | | | | 20 |
| 14 | (Netherlands) Jan Willem van Stee | (Netherlands) DRDO | | | | | | | | | | | 45 | 47 | | | 14 |
| 15 | (Netherlands) André Seinen | (Netherlands) DRDO | | | | | | | | | | | 43 | Ret | | | 9 |
| 16 | (Netherlands) Peter van der Ham | (Netherlands) DRDO | | | | | | | | | | | Ret | 42 | | | 9 |
| 17 | (Netherlands) Cees van Duijn (Netherlands) Floris van Duijn (Netherlands) Tristan van Duijn | (Netherlands) Koopman Racing | | | | | | | | | | | 46 | DNS | | | 5 |
| | (Netherlands) Daan Dullaart (Netherlands) Sander Dullaart | (Netherlands) DRDO | | | | | | | | | | | Ret | Ret | | | 0 |
| | (United Kingdom) Nick Sanderson | (United Kingdom) Ricci Concept | | | | | Ret | Ret | DNS | DNS | | | | | | | 0 |
Sport
| 1 | (Belgium) Bart van den Broeck (Belgium) Chris Voet | (Belgium) Traxx Racing Team | 29 | 36 | 28 | 30 | 22 | 18 | 17 | 19 | 28 | 20 | 37 | 37 | **10** | 9 | 266 |
| 2 | (Netherlands) Rob Nieman | (Netherlands) Spirit Racing | **31** | 34 | **25** | 34 | **20** | Ret | **15** | 13 | 27 | 22 | **35** | 44 | 9 | 10 | 258 |
| 3 | (Netherlands) Henk Tappel | (Netherlands) Racing Team Tappel | 33 | 42 | Ret | 36 | | | 16 | 14 | **26** | 19 | Ret | 40 | 8 | 11 | 179 |
| 3 | (Netherlands) Harold Wisselink | (Netherlands) Racing Team Tappel | | | Ret | 36 | | | 16 | 14 | | | | | 8 | 11 | 179 |
| 4 | (Netherlands) Bart Drost | (Netherlands) Spirit Racing | 36 | 37 | 26 | Ret | 21 | 21 | 18 | 15 | 29 | Ret | 39 | 45 | 11 | Ret | 169 |
| 5 | (Netherlands) Sandra van der Sloot (Netherlands) John van der Voort | (Netherlands) Kustlicht | 32 | 33 | DNS | DNS | 23 | 20 | Ret | 16 | Ret | 21 | 38 | 43 | DNS | Ret | 137 |
| 6 | (Netherlands) Pascal Ehlert | (Netherlands) RDS Racing | 35 | 39 | Ret | Ret | 24 | 24 | Ret | 20 | 31 | 24 | 44 | 46 | 12 | 13 | 135 |
| 7 | (Netherlands) Joey van Splunteren | (Netherlands) Spirit Racing | | | | | | | | | | | **35** | 38 | 14 | 8 | 78 |
| 8 | (Belgium) Lucas Groeneveld | (Netherlands) Certainty Racing Team | | | 27 | Ret | | | | | | | 42 | 39 | | | 47 |
| 9 | (Netherlands) Oscar Gräper | (Netherlands) Bas Koeten Racing | | | 30 | 31 | | | | | | | | | | | 33 |
| 10 | (Netherlands) Dilango de Vos (Netherlands) Dmitri de Vos | (Netherlands) JW Race Service | | | 32 | 32 | | | | | | | | | | | 28 |
| 11 | (Netherlands) Han Kolenaar | (Netherlands) DRDO | | | | | | | | | | | 47 | 48 | | | 14 |
| 12 | (Netherlands) Jan Bot (Netherlands) Leo van der Eijk | (Netherlands) Forze Hydrogen Electric Racing | | | | | | | | | 32 | DNS | | | | | 11 |
| 13 | (Netherlands) Hans Creemers (Netherlands) Raimond van Steen | (Netherlands) DRDO | | | | | | | | | | | 48 | 49 | | | 10 |
| Pos. | Driver | Team | (Belgium) SPA | | (Netherlands) ZAN | | (Belgium) ZOL | | (Netherlands) ZAN | | (Netherlands) ASS | | (Belgium) SPA | | (Netherlands) ASS | | Points |

Key
| Colour | Result |
|---|---|
| Gold | Winner |
| Silver | Second place |
| Bronze | Third place |
| Green | Other points position |
| Blue | Other classified position |
| Blue | Not classified, finished (NC) |
| Purple | Not classified, retired (Ret) |
| Red | Did not qualify (DNQ) |
| Red | Did not pre-qualify (DNPQ) |
| Black | Disqualified (DSQ) |
| White | Did not start (DNS) |
| White | Race cancelled (C) |
| Blank | Did not practice (DNP) |
| Blank | Excluded (EX) |
| Blank | Did not arrive (DNA) |
| Blank | Withdrawn (WD) |
| Blank | Did not enter (cell empty) |
| Text formatting | Meaning |
| **Bold** | Pole position |
| Italics | Fastest lap |
