= 2023 Supercar Challenge =

Twenty-third season of the Supercar Challenge

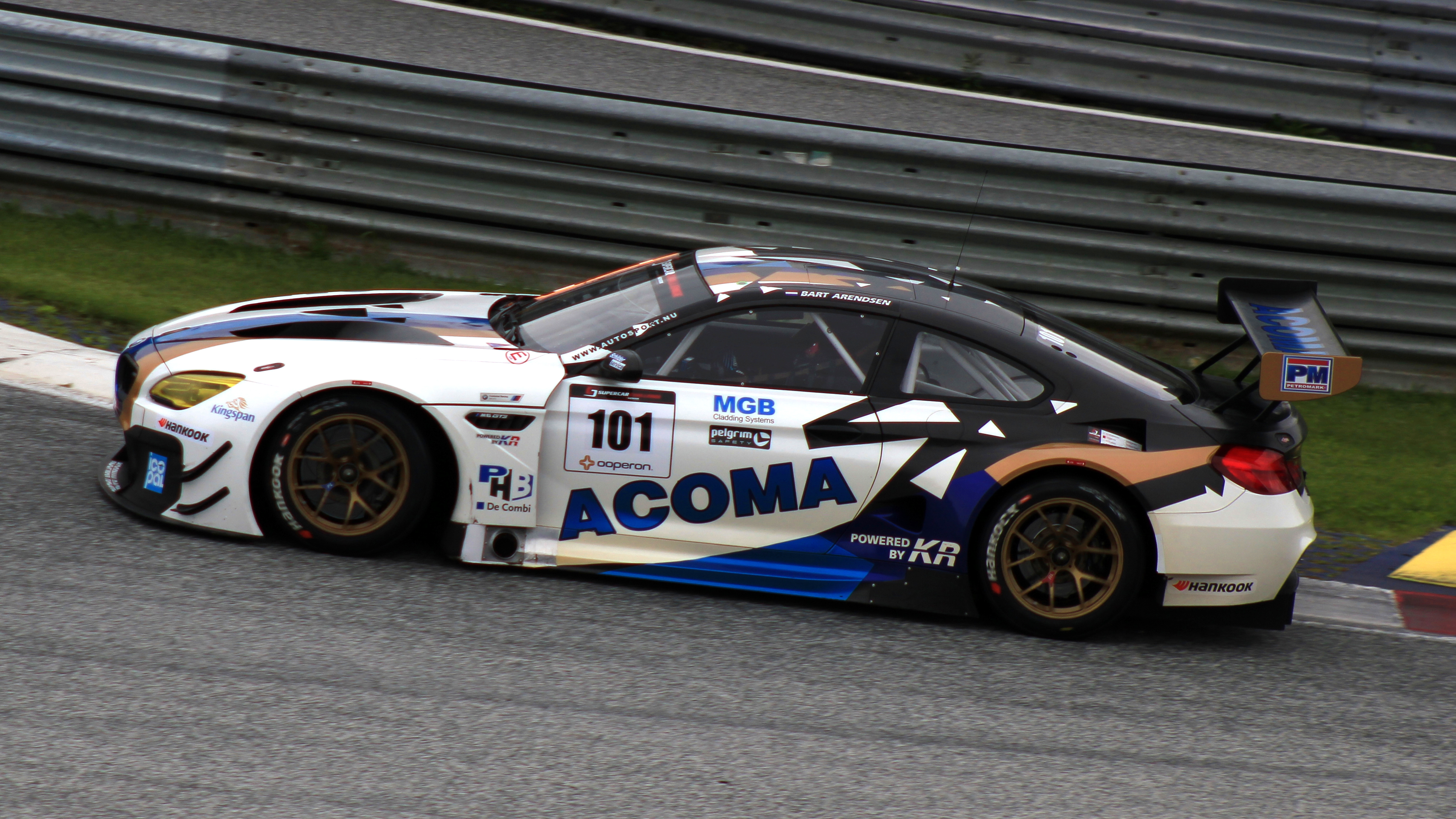
Bart Arendsen, defending overall and GT champion.

The 2023 Supercar Challenge powered by Pirelli was the twenty-third Supercar Challenge season since it replaced the Supercar Cup in 2001. It began at Circuit Zandvoort 14 April and ended at TT Circuit Assen on 29 October.

== Calendar ==
Round	Circuit	Date	Event	Notes
1	Circuit Zandvoort, Netherlands	14–16 April	Spring Races	Races contested with Prototype Challenge entries.
2	Red Bull Ring, Austria	19–21 May	BG Sport Events	Races contested with Prototype Challenge entries.
3	Circuit de Spa-Francorchamps, Belgium	2–4 June	Spa Euro Races	Races contested with Prototype Challenge entries.
4	Circuit Zolder, Belgium	7–9 July	Zolder Superprix	Races contested with Prototype Challenge entries.
5	TT Circuit Assen, Netherlands	11–13 August	JACK'S Racing Day	Races contested with Prototype Challenge entries.
6	Circuit Zandvoort, Netherlands	14–17 September	Trophy of the Dunes	Races contested with Prototype Challenge entries.
7	Circuit de Spa-Francorchamps, Belgium	13–15 October	Racing Festival	Races separate from Prototype Challenge entries. Contested with BMW M2 CS Racing Cup competitors.
8	TT Circuit Assen, Netherlands	27–29 October	Supercar Madness Finale Races	Races contested with Prototype Challenge entries.

== Entries ==
Team	Car	No.	Drivers	Class	Rounds
(Netherlands) / Koopman Racing (Note: Cars no. 101, 103, 105, 148, 149, 196, 197 198, 321, 323, 324, 328, 336, 432 and 433 entered as Koopman Racing and cars no. 351, 352, 353, 373, 451, 452, 453 and 473 entered as Koopman Racing by DRDO.); (Netherlands) / Koopman Racing by DRDO	BMW M6 GT3	101	(Netherlands) Bart Arendsen	GT	2, 5
(Netherlands) / Koopman Racing; (Netherlands) / Koopman Racing by DRDO	BMW M6 GT3	103	(Netherlands) Hein Koopman	GT	2
(Netherlands) / Koopman Racing; (Netherlands) / Koopman Racing by DRDO	BMW M6 GT3	103	(Netherlands) Ronald van Loon	GT	2
(Netherlands) / Koopman Racing; (Netherlands) / Koopman Racing by DRDO	BMW M6 GT3	105	(Netherlands) Mex Jansen	GT	All
(Netherlands) / Koopman Racing; (Netherlands) / Koopman Racing by DRDO	BMW M6 GT3	105	(Netherlands) Jordin Poland	GT	All
(Netherlands) / Koopman Racing; (Netherlands) / Koopman Racing by DRDO	BMW M6 GT3	107	(Netherlands) Daan Meijer	GT	1–3
(Netherlands) / Koopman Racing; (Netherlands) / Koopman Racing by DRDO	BMW M6 GT3	148	(Netherlands) Ivor Moens	GT	TBA
(Netherlands) / Koopman Racing; (Netherlands) / Koopman Racing by DRDO	BMW M6 GT3	149	(Netherlands) Cees Wjisman	GT	1–2, 6–8
(Netherlands) / Koopman Racing; (Netherlands) / Koopman Racing by DRDO	BMW M6 GT3	198	(Netherlands) Axel Jansen	GT	3
(Netherlands) / Koopman Racing; (Netherlands) / Koopman Racing by DRDO	BMW M6 GT3	198	(Netherlands) Ronald van Loon	GT	3
(Netherlands) / Koopman Racing; (Netherlands) / Koopman Racing by DRDO	BMW Z4 GT3	103	(Netherlands) Hein Koopman	GT	1, 3–8
(Netherlands) / Koopman Racing; (Netherlands) / Koopman Racing by DRDO	BMW M4 GT3	149	(Netherlands) Cees Wjisman	GT	3, 5
(Netherlands) / Koopman Racing; (Netherlands) / Koopman Racing by DRDO	BMW M4 GT3	196	(Netherlands) Roger Grouwels	GT	5
(Netherlands) / Koopman Racing; (Netherlands) / Koopman Racing by DRDO	BMW M4 GT4	321	(Netherlands) Frank Broerson	SS2	1–2
(Netherlands) / Koopman Racing; (Netherlands) / Koopman Racing by DRDO	BMW M4 GT4	323	(Netherlands) Maik Broerson	SS2	1–3, 5–8
(Netherlands) / Koopman Racing; (Netherlands) / Koopman Racing by DRDO	BMW M4 GT4	328	(Netherlands) Jos Harper	SS2	1–3, 5–8
(Netherlands) / Koopman Racing; (Netherlands) / Koopman Racing by DRDO	BMW M4 GT4	328	(Netherlands) Frank Broerson	SS2	5
(Netherlands) / Koopman Racing; (Netherlands) / Koopman Racing by DRDO	BMW 1 Series GTR	336	(Netherlands) Berry Arendsen	SS2	2, 5
(Netherlands) / Koopman Racing; (Netherlands) / Koopman Racing by DRDO	BMW 1 Series GTR	336	(Netherlands) Joop Arendsen	SS2	2, 5
(Netherlands) / Koopman Racing; (Netherlands) / Koopman Racing by DRDO	BMW M3 E46 GTR	324	(Netherlands) Gilles van Houten	SS2	1–2, 4
(Netherlands) / Koopman Racing; (Netherlands) / Koopman Racing by DRDO	BMW M3 E46 GTR	324	(Netherlands) Axel Jansen	SS2	1–2
(Netherlands) / Koopman Racing; (Netherlands) / Koopman Racing by DRDO	BMW M3 E46 GTR	373	(Netherlands) Martin Wijsman	SS2	3
(Netherlands) / Koopman Racing; (Netherlands) / Koopman Racing by DRDO	BMW M3 E46 GTR	473	(Netherlands) Martin Wijsman	SP	5
(Netherlands) / Koopman Racing; (Netherlands) / Koopman Racing by DRDO	BMW M3 E46	352	(Netherlands) Han Kirchhoff	SS2	3
(Netherlands) / Koopman Racing; (Netherlands) / Koopman Racing by DRDO	BMW M3 E46	452	(Netherlands) Han Kirchhoff	SP	5
(Netherlands) / Koopman Racing; (Netherlands) / Koopman Racing by DRDO	BMW M3 E46	353	(Netherlands) Han Wannet	SS2	3
(Netherlands) / Koopman Racing; (Netherlands) / Koopman Racing by DRDO	BMW M3 E46	453	(Netherlands) Han Wannet	SP	5
(Netherlands) / Koopman Racing; (Netherlands) / Koopman Racing by DRDO	BMW M3 E46	451	(Netherlands) Peter Koelewijn	SP	5
(Netherlands) / Koopman Racing; (Netherlands) / Koopman Racing by DRDO	BMW M240i Racing	432	(Netherlands) Emile Drummen	SP	1, 3, 5, 7–8
(Netherlands) / Koopman Racing; (Netherlands) / Koopman Racing by DRDO	BMW M240i Racing	432	(Netherlands) Tom Drummen	SP	1, 3, 5, 7–8
(Netherlands) / Koopman Racing; (Netherlands) / Koopman Racing by DRDO	BMW M3 E46 GTR	433	(Netherlands) Mick Schutte	SP	2, 4–5
(Netherlands) BODA Racing	BMW M6 GT3	107	(Netherlands) Daan Meijer	GT	5
(Netherlands) BODA Racing	Bentley Continental GT3	177	(Netherlands) Bob Herber	GT	2–3, 5
(Netherlands) JR Motorsport	BMW M6 GT3	108	(Netherlands) Ted van Vliet	GT	All
(Netherlands) JR Motorsport	BMW M6 GT3	108	(Netherlands) Willem Meijer	GT	5–7
(Netherlands) JR Motorsport	BMW M6 GT3	111	(Netherlands) Max Tubben	GT	All
(Netherlands) JR Motorsport	BMW M6 GT3	111	(Netherlands) Max Weering	GT	All
(Netherlands) JR Motorsport	BMW M3 E46	233	(Netherlands) Remco de Beus	SS1	All
(Netherlands) JR Motorsport	BMW M3 E46	233	(Netherlands) Bas Schouten	SS1	4–5
(Netherlands) JR Motorsport	BMW M3 F80	246	(Netherlands) Ruud Olij	SS1	6–7
(Austria) MZR-Motorsport Zentrum Ried	KTM X-Bow GT2	112	(Switzerland) Martin Koch	GT	1–2
(United Kingdom) ES Motorsport	Lamborghini Huracán Super Trofeo Evo	117	(United Kingdom) Jason McInulty	GT	3
(Belgium) Speedlover	Porsche 992 GT3 Cup	128	(France) Pierre-Etienne Bordet	GT	3, 6
(Sweden) Hans Hjelm Racing	Ferrari 488 GT3 Evo 2020	134	(Sweden) Hans Hjelm	GT	1
(Netherlands) / Ferry Monster Autosport (Note: Cars no. 174 and 207 entered as Ferry Monster Autosport, car no. 201 entered as FEBO Racing Team, car no. 264 entered as DK Racing powered by FMA and car no. 307 entered as Emergo Racing powered by FMA); (Netherlands) / FEBO Racing Team; (Netherlands) / DK Racing powered by FMA; (Netherlands) / Emergo Racing powered by FMA	BMW M6 GT3	174	(Netherlands) Bas Schouten	GT	7
(Netherlands) / Ferry Monster Autosport; (Netherlands) / FEBO Racing Team; (Netherlands) / DK Racing powered by FMA; (Netherlands) / Emergo Racing powered by FMA	BMW M6 GT3	174	(Netherlands) Jayden Post	GT	7
(Netherlands) / Ferry Monster Autosport; (Netherlands) / FEBO Racing Team; (Netherlands) / DK Racing powered by FMA; (Netherlands) / Emergo Racing powered by FMA	Hyundai i30 N TCR	201	(Netherlands) Dennis de Borst	SS1	All
(Netherlands) / Ferry Monster Autosport; (Netherlands) / FEBO Racing Team; (Netherlands) / DK Racing powered by FMA; (Netherlands) / Emergo Racing powered by FMA	Hyundai i30 N TCR	201	(Netherlands) Steff de Borst	SS1	All
(Netherlands) / Ferry Monster Autosport; (Netherlands) / FEBO Racing Team; (Netherlands) / DK Racing powered by FMA; (Netherlands) / Emergo Racing powered by FMA	CUPRA León TCR	206	(Netherlands) Tony Vijfschaft	SS1	5
(Netherlands) / Ferry Monster Autosport; (Netherlands) / FEBO Racing Team; (Netherlands) / DK Racing powered by FMA; (Netherlands) / Emergo Racing powered by FMA	Volkswagen Golf GTI TCR	264	(Belgium) Jonas de Kimpe	SS1	3, 5–7
(Netherlands) / Ferry Monster Autosport; (Netherlands) / FEBO Racing Team; (Netherlands) / DK Racing powered by FMA; (Netherlands) / Emergo Racing powered by FMA	Volkswagen Golf GTI TCR	264	(Belgium) John de Wilde	SS1	5–6
(Netherlands) / Ferry Monster Autosport; (Netherlands) / FEBO Racing Team; (Netherlands) / DK Racing powered by FMA; (Netherlands) / Emergo Racing powered by FMA	Volkswagen Golf GTI TCR	307	(Netherlands) Priscilla Speelman	SS2	2–3, 5–8
(Netherlands) / Ferry Monster Autosport; (Netherlands) / FEBO Racing Team; (Netherlands) / DK Racing powered by FMA; (Netherlands) / Emergo Racing powered by FMA	Volkswagen Golf GTI TCR	307	(Netherlands) Teunis van der Grift	SS2	3, 5–6, 8
(Netherlands) Dams Racing	BMW M4 GT4	209	(Netherlands) Andy Dam	SS1	1
(Netherlands) Dams Racing	BMW M4 GT4	309	(Netherlands) Andy Dam	SS2	2–3
(Netherlands) Racing Team Tappel	BMW Z4 Zilhouette	211	(Netherlands) Henk Tappel	SS1	1–3, 5–6, 8
(Netherlands) Racing Team Tappel	BMW Z4 Zilhouette	211	(Netherlands) Harold Wisselink	SS1	1–3, 5–6, 8
(Netherlands) Bas Koeten Racing	Audi RS 3 LMS TCR (2017)	222	(Netherlands) Laurens de Wit	SS1	All
(Netherlands) Bas Koeten Racing	Audi RS 3 LMS TCR (2017)	222	(Netherlands) Fabian Schoonhoven	SS1	5, 7–8
(Netherlands) Bas Koeten Racing	Porsche 718 Cayman GT4 Clubsport	305	(Netherlands) Bas Barenbrug	SS2	1–3, 6–8
(Netherlands) / Certainty Racing (Note: Car no. 244 entered as Certainty Racing and cars no. 354 and 357 entered as Certainty Racing by DRDO.); (Netherlands) / Certainty Racing by DRDO	Audi RS 3 LMS TCR (2017)	244	(Netherlands) Paul Meijer	SS1	3, 6
(Netherlands) / Certainty Racing; (Netherlands) / Certainty Racing by DRDO	Audi RS 3 LMS TCR (2017)	244	(Netherlands) Tim Schulte	SS1	3, 6
(Netherlands) / Certainty Racing; (Netherlands) / Certainty Racing by DRDO	BMW M3 E46	357	(Netherlands) Dennis van der Linden	SS2	3
(Netherlands) Harders Plaza	BMW M3 E90	245	(Netherlands) Benjamin van den Berg	SS1	5
(Netherlands) Harders Plaza	BMW M3 E90	245	(Netherlands) Robert van den Berg	SS1	5
(Netherlands) Euro Autosport Foundation	BMW M3 F80	246	(Netherlands) Ruud Olij	SS1	1–2
(Belgium) Traxx Racing Team	Alpine A110 Cup	301	(Belgium) Bart van den Broeck	SS2	1–7
(Belgium) Traxx Racing Team	Alpine A110 Cup	301	(Belgium) Chris Voet	SS2	1–7
(Belgium) Traxx Racing Team	Renault Clio IV	802	(Belgium) Leon Iserbyt	SP2	1–7
(Belgium) Traxx Racing Team	Renault Clio IV	802	(Belgium) Ignace van den Broeck	SP2	1–7
(Netherlands) Zilhouette Racing	Zilhouette GTS	310	(Netherlands) Jacob Kuil	SS2	7–8
(Netherlands) Zilhouette Racing	Zilhouette GTS	310	(Netherlands) Mark Wieringa	SS2	7–8
(Netherlands) Zilhouette Racing	Zilhouette Sport	410	(Netherlands) Mark Wieringa	SP	2, 6
(Netherlands) Zilhouette Racing	Zilhouette Sport	420	(Netherlands) Oscar Vianen	SP	1–2
(Netherlands) Zilhouette Racing	Zilhouette Sport	420	(Netherlands) Mark Jobst	SP	1, 3, 5
(Netherlands) Zilhouette Racing	Zilhouette Sport	461	(Netherlands) Tom Vanderheyden	SP	4, 6
(Netherlands) Zilhouette Racing	Zilhouette Sport	461	(Netherlands) Oscar Vianen	SP	4, 6
(Netherlands) Zilhouette Racing	Zilhouette Sport	461	(Netherlands) Mark Jobst	SP	7–8
(Netherlands) Zilhouette Racing	Zilhouette Sport	469	(Netherlands) Jan Berry Drenth	SP	1–2, 4
(Netherlands) Zilhouette Racing	Zilhouette Sport	481	(Netherlands) Bernard Blaak	SP	1–2, 5, 8
(Netherlands) Zilhouette Racing	Zilhouette Sport	481	(Netherlands) Lars Blaak	SP	1–2, 8
(Netherlands) Zilhouette Racing	Zilhouette Sport	489	(Netherlands) Pieter de Jong	SP	1–2, 4, 6–8
(Netherlands) Zilhouette Racing	Zilhouette Sport	489	(Netherlands) Jack Hoekstra	SP	1–2, 4, 6–8
(Netherlands) DayVTec	BMW 240i	311	(Netherlands) Andre Seinen	SS2	7
(Netherlands) DayVTec	BMW 240i	312	(Netherlands) Britt van Osta	SS2	4
(Netherlands) DayVTec	BMW 240i	312	(Belgium) Robin van Osta	SS2	4
(Belgium) Team VDB	CUPRA León TCR	325	(Netherlands) Yardy Hoogwerf	SS2	1, 5
(Belgium) Team VDB	CUPRA León TCR	325	(Belgium) Steven Teirlinck	SS2	1, 5
(Belgium) Verhulst Invest Motorsport	Honda Civic Type R TCR (FK8)	339	(Belgium) Tony Verhulst	SS2	1–5
(Belgium) JJ Motorsport	BMW M2 ClubSport Racing	335	(Netherlands) Patrick de Vreede	SS2	5
(Belgium) JJ Motorsport	BMW M2 ClubSport Racing	335	(Netherlands) Rogier de Leeuw	SS2	5
(Netherlands) CP Motorsport by DRDO	BMW M2 ClubSport Racing	369	(Netherlands) Haso Keric	SS2	3
(Netherlands) CP Motorsport by DRDO	BMW M2 ClubSport Racing	369	(Netherlands) Semo Keric	SS2	3
(Netherlands) CP Motorsport by DRDO	BMW M2 ClubSport Racing	381	(Netherlands) Daaf Steentjes	SS2	5
(Netherlands) CP Motorsport by DRDO	BMW M2 ClubSport Racing	382	(Netherlands) Christian Frankenhout	SS2	5
(Netherlands) CP Motorsport by DRDO	BMW M2 ClubSport Racing	382	(Netherlands) Meindert van Buuren Jr.	SS2	5
(Netherlands) CP Motorsport by DRDO	BMW M2 ClubSport Racing	383	(Netherlands) Patrick Grootscholten	SS2	3
(Netherlands) CP Motorsport by DRDO	BMW M2 ClubSport Racing	383	(Netherlands) Daaf Steentjes	SS2	3
(Netherlands) Spirit Racing	Renault Clio Cup RS	401	(Netherlands) Rob Nieman	SP	1, 3–8
(Netherlands) Spirit Racing	Renault Clio Cup RS	401	(Netherlands) Simon Knap	SP	5
(Netherlands) Spirit Racing	Renault Clio IV	402	(Belgium) Wouter Maderveld	SP	1, 3
(Netherlands) Spirit Racing	Renault Clio IV	402	(Netherlands) Raymond Koper	SP	1, 5
(Netherlands) Spirit Racing	Renault Clio IV	402	(Netherlands) John van der Voort	SP	5
(Netherlands) Spirit Racing	Renault Clio IV	404	(Netherlands) Christian Dijkhof	SP	4
(Netherlands) DRDO	BMW 1 Series 135i	454	(Netherlands) Dirk Dekker	SP	5
(Netherlands) DRDO	BMW 1 Series 135i	454	(Netherlands) Koen de Wit	SP	5
(Belgium) Peter Sterken	BMW 330i	471	(Belgium) Harry Steegmans	SP	4
(Belgium) Peter Sterken	BMW 330i	471	(Belgium) Peter Sterken	SP	4
(Ukraine) Protasov Racing	BMW 325ti Compact	860	(Ukraine) Leonid Protasov	SP2	2–3, 5–6, 8
(Ukraine) Protasov Racing	BMW 325ti Compact	860	(Ukraine) Sergii Pustovoitenko	SP2	2–3, 6
(Ukraine) Protasov Racing	BMW 325ti Compact	860	(Ukraine) Oleksandr Dobik	SP2	8
(Belgium) HD Racing	Renault Clio Cup RS	862	(Belgium) Robin Dries	SP2	3
(Belgium) HD Racing	Renault Clio Cup RS	862	(Belgium) Samuel Hilgers	SP2	3
(Austria) Baron Motorsport	Ferrari 488 GT3 Evo 2020	899	(Austria) Philipp Baron	GT	2
(Austria) Baron Motorsport	Ferrari 488 GT3 Evo 2020	899	(Austria) Ernst Kirchmayr	GT	2

Icon	Class
GT	GT class
SS1	Supersport 1 class
SS2	Supersport 2 class
SP	Sport class
SP2	Sport 2 class

== Race results ==
Bold indicates overall winner.

Round		Circuit	GT Winning Car	Supersport 1 Winning Car	Supersport 2 Winning Car	Sport Winning Car	Sport 2 Winning Car
Round		Circuit	GT Winning Drivers	Supersport 1 Winning Drivers	Supersport 2 Winning Drivers	Sport Winning Drivers	Sport 2 Winning Drivers
1	R1	(Netherlands) Zandvoort	**(Netherlands) No. 105 Koopman Racing**	(Netherlands) No. 246 Euro Autosport Foundation	(Netherlands) No. 323 Koopman Racing	(Netherlands) No. 461 Zilhouette Racing	(Belgium) No. 801 Traxx Racing Team
1	R1	(Netherlands) Zandvoort	**(Netherlands) Mex Jansen** **(Netherlands) Jordin Poland**	(Netherlands) Ruud Olij	(Netherlands) Maik Broerson	(Netherlands) Mark Jobst (Netherlands) Oscar Vianen	(Belgium) Leon Iserbyt (Belgium) Ignace van den Broeck
1	R2	(Netherlands) Zandvoort	**(Netherlands) No. 111 JR Motorsport**	(Netherlands) No. 222 Bas Koeten Racing	(Belgium) No. 339 Verhulst Invest Motorsports	(Netherlands) No. 469 Zilhouette Racing	(Belgium) No. 801 Traxx Racing Team
1	R2	(Netherlands) Zandvoort	**(Netherlands) Max Tubben** **(Netherlands) Max Weering**	(Netherlands) Laurens de Wit	(Belgium) Tony Verhulst	(Netherlands) Jan Berry Drenth	(Belgium) Leon Iserbyt (Belgium) Ignace van den Broeck
2	R1	(Austria) Red Bull Ring	**(Austria) No. 899 Baron Motorsport**	(Netherlands) No. 246 Euro Autosport Foundation	(Netherlands) No. 307 Emergo Racing powered by FMA	(Netherlands) No. 498 Zilhouette Racing	(Belgium) No. 801 Traxx Racing Team
2	R1	(Austria) Red Bull Ring	**(Austria) Philipp Baron** **(Austria) Ernst Kirchmayr**	(Netherlands) Ruud Olij	(Netherlands) Priscilla Speelman	(Netherlands) Pieter de Jong (Netherlands) Jack Hoekstra	(Belgium) Leon Iserbyt (Belgium) Ignace van den Broeck
2	R2	(Austria) Red Bull Ring	**(Netherlands) No. 177 BODA Racing**	(Netherlands) No. 246 Euro Autosport Foundation	(Netherlands) No. 307 Emergo Racing powered by FMA	(Netherlands) No. 498 Zilhouette Racing	(Belgium) No. 801 Traxx Racing Team
2	R2	(Austria) Red Bull Ring	**(Netherlands) Bob Herber**	(Netherlands) Ruud Olij	(Netherlands) Priscilla Speelman	(Netherlands) Pieter de Jong (Netherlands) Jack Hoekstra	(Belgium) Leon Iserbyt (Belgium) Ignace van den Broeck
3	R1	(Belgium) Spa-Francorchamps	**(Netherlands) No. 105 Koopman Racing**	(Netherlands) No. 264 DK Racing powered by FMA	(Netherlands) No. 323 Koopman Racing	(Netherlands) No. 461 Zilhouette Racing	(Belgium) No. 801 Traxx Racing Team
3	R1	(Belgium) Spa-Francorchamps	**(Netherlands) Mex Jansen** **(Netherlands) Jordin Poland**	(Belgium) Jonas de Kimpe	(Netherlands) Maik Broerson	(Netherlands) Mark Jobst	(Belgium) Leon Iserbyt (Belgium) Ignace van den Broeck
3	R2	(Belgium) Spa-Francorchamps	**(Netherlands) No. 111 JR Motorsport**	(Netherlands) No. 264 DK Racing powered by FMA	(Netherlands) No. 309 Dams Racing	(Netherlands) No. 401 Spirit Racing	(Belgium) No. 862 HD Racing
3	R2	(Belgium) Spa-Francorchamps	**(Netherlands) Max Tubben** **(Netherlands) Max Weering**	(Belgium) Jonas de Kimpe	(Netherlands) Andy Dam	(Netherlands) Rob Nieman	(Belgium) Robin Dries (Belgium) Samuel Hilgers
4	R1	(Belgium) Zolder	**(Netherlands) No. 105 Koopman Racing**	(Netherlands) No. 233 JR Motorsport	(Belgium) No. 339 Verhulst Invest Motorsports	(Netherlands) No. 433 Koopman Racing	(Belgium) No. 801 Traxx Racing Team
4	R1	(Belgium) Zolder	**(Netherlands) Mex Jansen** **(Netherlands) Jordin Poland**	(Netherlands) Bas Schouten (Netherlands) Remco de Beus	(Belgium) Tony Verhulst	(Netherlands) Mick Schutte	(Belgium) Leon Iserbyt (Belgium) Ignace van den Broeck
4	R2	(Belgium) Zolder	**(Netherlands) No. 105 Koopman Racing**	(Netherlands) No. 201 FEBO Racing Team	(Netherlands) No. 312 DayVTec	(Netherlands) No. 498 Zilhouette Racing	(Belgium) No. 801 Traxx Racing Team
4	R2	(Belgium) Zolder	**(Netherlands) Mex Jansen** **(Netherlands) Jordin Poland**	(Netherlands) Dennis de Borst (Netherlands) Steff de Borst	(Netherlands) Britt van Osta (Belgium) Robin van Osta	(Netherlands) Pieter de Jong (Netherlands) Jack Hoekstra	(Belgium) Leon Iserbyt (Belgium) Ignace van den Broeck
5	R1	(Netherlands) Assen	**(Netherlands) No. 105 Koopman Racing**	(Netherlands) No. 211 Racing Team Tappel	(Netherlands) No. 307 Emergo Racing powered by FMA	(Netherlands) No. 454 DRDO	(Belgium) No. 801 Traxx Racing Team
5	R1	(Netherlands) Assen	**(Netherlands) Mex Jansen** **(Netherlands) Jordin Poland**	(Netherlands) Henk Tappel (Netherlands) Harold Wisselink	(Netherlands) Priscilla Speelman (Netherlands) Teunis van der Grift	(Netherlands) Dirk Dekker (Netherlands) Koen de Wit	(Belgium) Leon Iserbyt (Belgium) Ignace van den Broeck
5	R2	(Netherlands) Assen	**(Netherlands) No. 111 JR Motorsport**	(Netherlands) No. 206 Ferry Monster Autosport	(Netherlands) No. 323 Koopman Racing	(Netherlands) No. 401 Spirit Racing	(Belgium) No. 801 Traxx Racing Team
5	R2	(Netherlands) Assen	**(Netherlands) Max Tubben** **(Netherlands) Max Weering**	(Netherlands) Tony Vijfschaft	(Netherlands) Maik Broerson	(Netherlands) Simon Knap (Netherlands) Rob Nieman	(Belgium) Leon Iserbyt (Belgium) Ignace van den Broeck
6	R1	(Netherlands) Zandvoort	**(Netherlands) No. 105 Koopman Racing**	(Netherlands) No. 246 Euro Autosport Foundation	(Netherlands) No. 305 Bas Koeten Racing	(Netherlands) No. 410 Zilhouette Racing	(Belgium) No. 801 Traxx Racing Team
6	R1	(Netherlands) Zandvoort	**(Netherlands) Mex Jansen** **(Netherlands) Jordin Poland**	(Netherlands) Ruud Olij	(Netherlands) Bas Barenbrug	(Netherlands) Mark Wieringa	(Belgium) Leon Iserbyt (Belgium) Ignace van den Broeck
6	R2	(Netherlands) Zandvoort	**(Netherlands) No. 111 JR Motorsport**	(Netherlands) No. 201 FEBO Racing Team	(Netherlands) No. 307 Emergo Racing powered by FMA	(Netherlands) No. 410 Zilhouette Racing	(Belgium) No. 801 Traxx Racing Team
6	R2	(Netherlands) Zandvoort	**(Netherlands) Max Tubben** **(Netherlands) Max Weering**	(Netherlands) Dennis de Borst (Netherlands) Steff de Borst	(Netherlands) Priscilla Speelman (Netherlands) Teunis van der Grift	(Netherlands) Mark Wieringa	(Belgium) Leon Iserbyt (Belgium) Ignace van den Broeck
7	R1	(Belgium) Spa-Francorchamps	**(Netherlands) No. 105 Koopman Racing**	(Netherlands) No. 201 FEBO Racing Team	(Netherlands) No. 307 Emergo Racing powered by FMA	(Netherlands) No. 461 Zilhouette Racing	(Belgium) No. 801 Traxx Racing Team
7	R1	(Belgium) Spa-Francorchamps	**(Netherlands) Mex Jansen** **(Netherlands) Jordin Poland**	(Netherlands) Dennis de Borst (Netherlands) Steff de Borst	(Netherlands) Priscilla Speelman	(Netherlands) Mark Jobst	(Belgium) Leon Iserbyt (Belgium) Ignace van den Broeck
7	R2	(Belgium) Spa-Francorchamps	**(Netherlands) No. 108 JR Motorsport**	(Netherlands) No. 264 DK Racing powered by FMA	(Netherlands) No. 307 Emergo Racing powered by FMA	(Netherlands) No. 461 Zilhouette Racing	(Belgium) No. 801 Traxx Racing Team
7	R2	(Belgium) Spa-Francorchamps	**(Netherlands) Willem Meijer** **(Netherlands) Ted van Vliet**	(Belgium) Jonas de Kimpe	(Netherlands) Priscilla Speelman	(Netherlands) Mark Jobst	(Belgium) Leon Iserbyt (Belgium) Ignace van den Broeck
8	R1	(Netherlands) Assen	**(Netherlands) No. 111 JR Motorsport**	(Netherlands) No. 264 DK Racing powered by FMA	(Netherlands) No. 307 Emergo Racing powered by FMA	(Netherlands) No. 498 Zilhouette Racing	(Ukraine) No. 860 Protasov Racing
8	R1	(Netherlands) Assen	**(Netherlands) Max Tubben** **(Netherlands) Max Weering**	(Netherlands) Dennis de Borst (Netherlands) Steff de Borst	(Netherlands) Priscilla Speelman (Netherlands) Teunis van der Grift	(Netherlands) Pieter de Jong (Netherlands) Jack Hoekstra	(Ukraine) Oleksandr Dobik (Ukraine) Leonid Protasov
8	R2	(Netherlands) Assen	**(Netherlands) No. 111 JR Motorsport**	(Netherlands) No. 201 FEBO Racing Team	(Netherlands) No. 307 Emergo Racing powered by FMA	(Netherlands) No. 498 Zilhouette Racing	(Ukraine) No. 860 Protasov Racing
8	R2	(Netherlands) Assen	**(Netherlands) Max Tubben** **(Netherlands) Max Weering**	(Netherlands) Dennis de Borst (Netherlands) Steff de Borst	(Netherlands) Priscilla Speelman	(Netherlands) Pieter de Jong (Netherlands) Jack Hoekstra	(Ukraine) Oleksandr Dobik (Ukraine) Leonid Protasov

=== Championship standings ===
Position	**1st**	**2nd**	**3rd**	**4th**	**5th**	**6th**	**7th**	**8th**	**9th**	**10th**	**11th**	**Pole**
Points	23	20	17	15	13	11	9	7	5	3	1	1

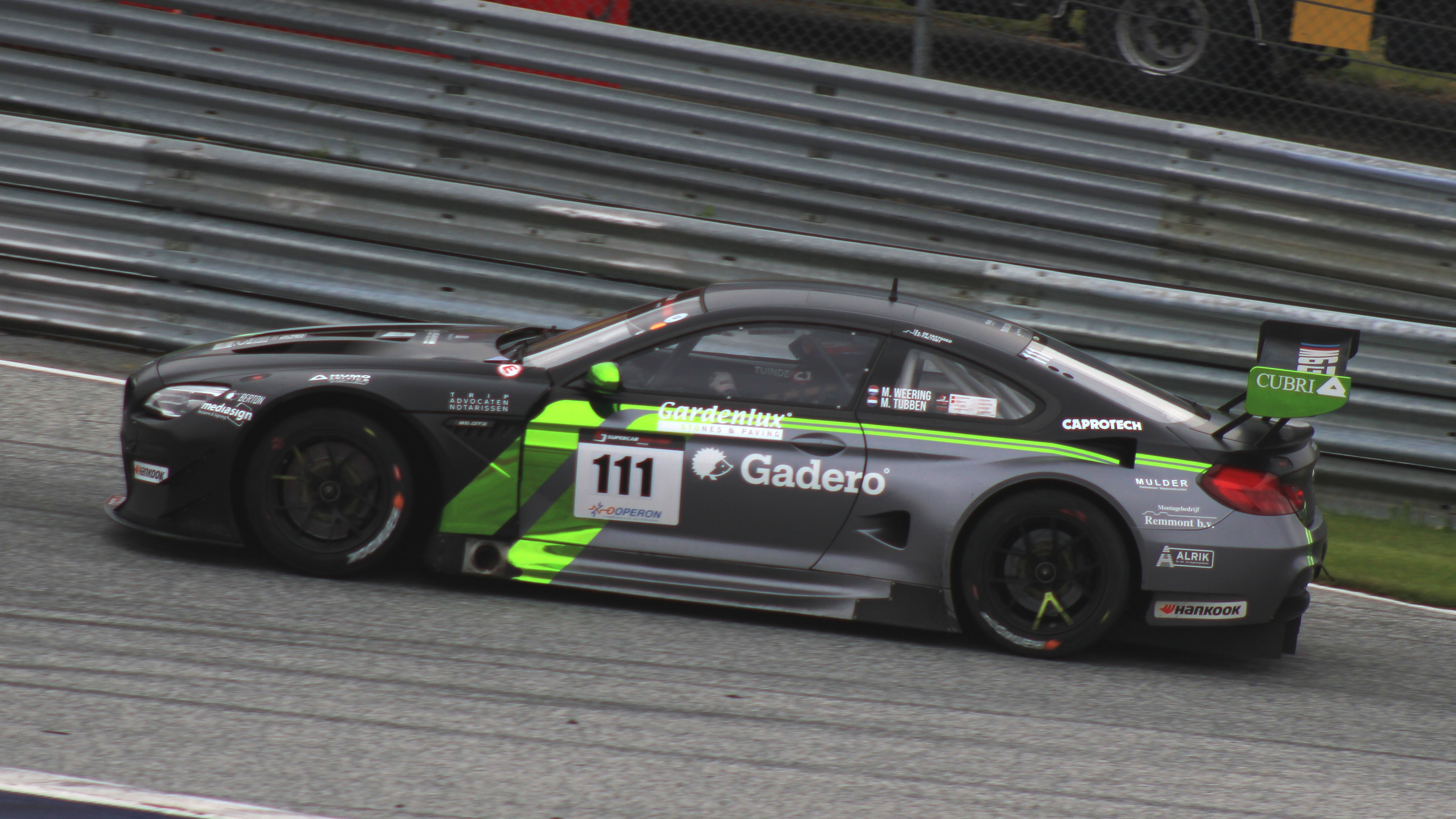
GT championship leaders, Max Tubben and Max Weering.

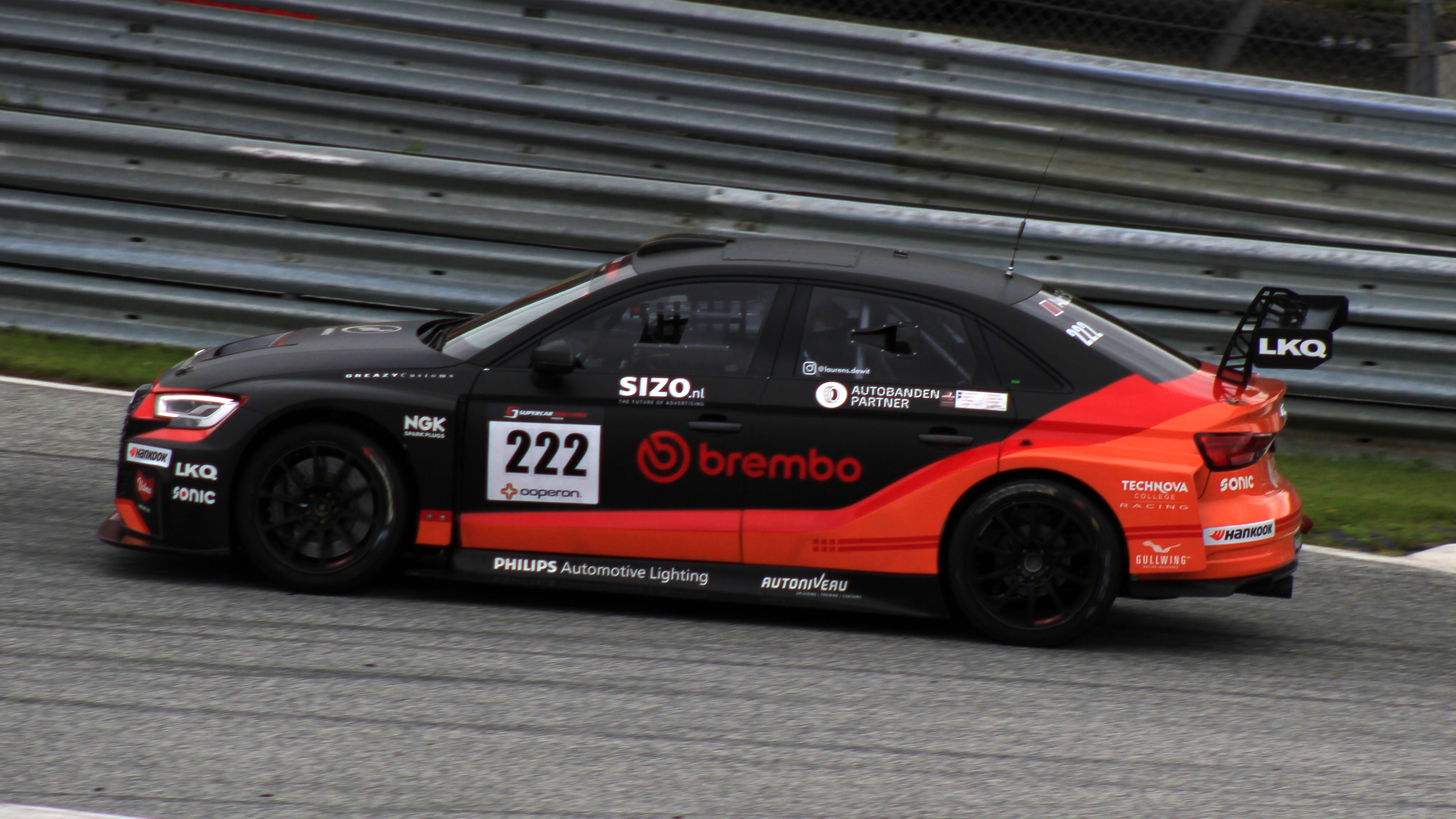
Supersport 1 championship leader, Laurens de Wit.

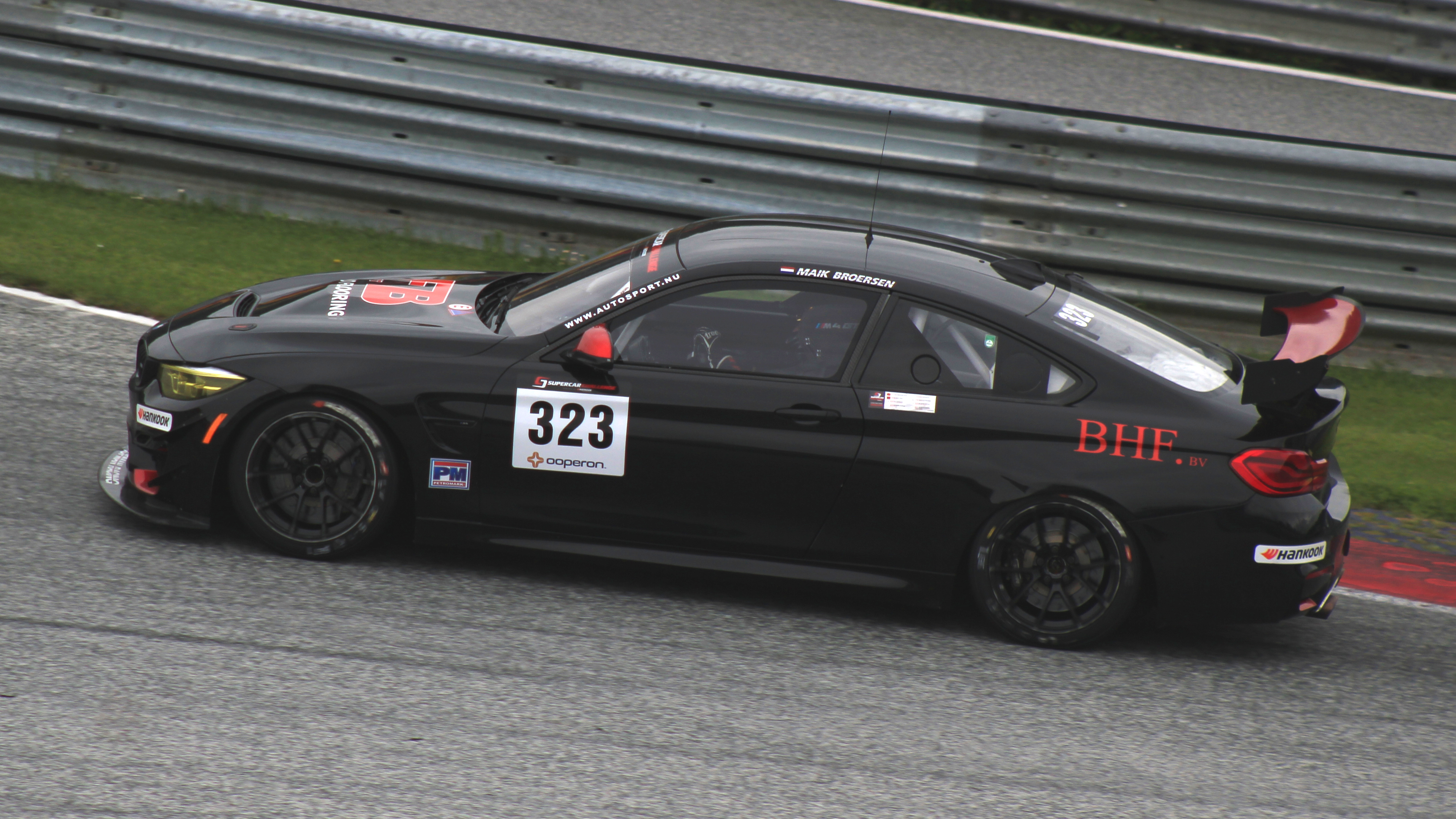
Supersport 2 championship leader, Maik Broersen.

Pos.	Driver	Team	(Netherlands) ZAN		(Austria) RBR		(Belgium) SPA		(Belgium) ZOL		(Netherlands) ASS		(Netherlands) ZAN		(Belgium) SPA		(Netherlands) ASS	Points
GT
1	(Netherlands) Max Tubben (Netherlands) Max Weering	(Netherlands) JR Motorsport	Ret	1	3	3	**3**	2	**3**	2	4	3	**2**	2	3	2		266
2	(Netherlands) Mex Jansen (Netherlands) Jordin Poland	(Netherlands) Koopman Racing	**1**	2	4	4	2	Ret	2	1	**3**	6	1	Ret	**1**	Ret		229
3	(Netherlands) Ted van Vliet	(Netherlands) JR Motorsport	6	4	5	25	6	5	20	18	6	5	4	3	4	1		221
4	(Netherlands) Cees Wijsman	(Netherlands) Koopman Racing	7	5	7	Ret	19	14			14	11	5	5	8	4		133
5	(Netherlands) Hein Koopman	(Netherlands) Koopman Racing	Ret	6	8	6	Ret	20	4	5	8	9	6	Ret	5	5		133
6	(Netherlands) Willem Meijer	(Netherlands) JR Motorsport									6	WD	4	3	4	1		90
7	(Netherlands) Daan Meijer	(Netherlands) Koopman Racing	3	DNS	6	5	5	Ret										86
7	(Netherlands) Daan Meijer	(Netherlands) BODA Racing									5	8						86
8	(Netherlands) Bob Herber	(Netherlands) BODA Racing			**2**	1	Ret	4			Ret	Ret						65
9	(Netherlands) Bart Arendsen	(Netherlands) Koopman Racing			Ret	2					Ret	4						40
10	(France) Pierre-Etienne Bordet	(Belgium) Speedlover					7	7					9	Ret				39
14	(Netherlands) Jayden Post (Netherlands) Bas Schouten	(Netherlands) Ferry Monster Autosport													2	3		37
12	(Switzerland) Martin Koch	(Austria) MZR-Motorsport Zentrum Ried	2	3	DNS	DNS												37
13	(Netherlands) Roger Grouwels	(Netherlands) Koopman Racing									7	7						26
14	(Austria) Philipp Baron (Austria) Ernst Kirchmayr	(Austria) Baron Motorsport			1	DNS												23
15	(Netherlands) Ronald van Loon	(Netherlands) Koopman Racing			8	6	DNS	DNS										18
	(Netherlands) Axel Jansen	(Netherlands) Koopman Racing					DNS	DNS										0
	(United Kingdom) Jason McInulty	(United Kingdom) ES Motorsport					DNS	DNS										0
	(Sweden) Hans Hjelm	(Sweden) Hans Hjelm Racing	WD	WD														0
GT Trophy
1	(Netherlands) Cees Wijsman	(Netherlands) Koopman Racing	7	5	7	Ret	19	14			14	11	**5**	5	8	4		150
2	(Netherlands) Ted van Vliet	(Netherlands) JR Motorsport	6	4	5	25	6	5	20	18		5						132
3	(Netherlands) Daan Meijer	(Netherlands) Koopman Racing	3	DNS	6	5	5	Ret										123
3	(Netherlands) Daan Meijer	(Netherlands) BODA Racing									5	8						123
4	(Netherlands) Hein Koopman	(Netherlands) Koopman Racing	Ret	6	8	6	Ret	20	**4**	5	8	9	6	Ret	**5**	4		110
5	(Netherlands) Bob Herber	(Netherlands) BODA Racing			**2**	1	**Ret**	4			**Ret**	Ret						72
6	(France) Pierre-Etienne Bordet	(Belgium) Speedlover					7	7					9	Ret				51
7	(Switzerland) Martin Koch	(Austria) MZR-Motorsport Zentrum Ried	**2**	3	DNS	DNS												47
8	(Netherlands) Roger Grouwels	(Netherlands) Koopman Racing									7	7						40
9	(Netherlands) Ronald van Loon	(Netherlands) Koopman Racing			8	6	DNS	DNS										30
	(Netherlands) Axel Jansen	(Netherlands) Koopman Racing					DNS	DNS										0
	(United Kingdom) Jason McInulty	(United Kingdom) ES Motorsport					DNS	DNS										0
	(Sweden) Hans Hjelm	(Sweden) Hans Hjelm Racing	WD	WD														0
Supersport 1
1	(Netherlands) Laurens de Wit	(Netherlands) Bas Koeten Racing	11	9	14	11	9	10	9	8	21	17	25	8	7	12		244
2	(Netherlands) Remco de Beus	(Netherlands) JR Motorsport	10	14	19	DNS	12	12	8	10	**17**	15	13	24	14	8		212
3	(Netherlands) Dennis de Borst (Netherlands) Steff de Borst	(Netherlands) FEBO Racing Team	**15**	11	15	10	14	9	Ret	7	19	16	Ret	7	6	28		209
4	(Netherlands) Ruud Olij	(Netherlands) Euro Autosport Foundation	9	10	12	9												150
4	(Netherlands) Ruud Olij	(Netherlands) JR Motorsport											**11**	Ret	9	7		150
5	(Belgium) Jonas de Kimpe	(Netherlands) DK Racing powered by FMA					**8**	8			20	14	12	12	**Ret**	6		134
6	(Netherlands) Bas Schouten	(Netherlands) JR Motorsport							8	10	**17**	15						74
7	(Belgium) John de Wilde	(Netherlands) DK Racing powered by FMA									20	14	12	12				63
8	(Netherlands) Henk Tappel (Netherlands) Harold Wisselink	(Netherlands) Racing Team Tappel	Ret	13	**Ret**	DNS	23	33			15	Ret	Ret	Ret				61
9	(Netherlands) Paul Meijer (Netherlands) Tim Schulte	(Netherlands) Certainty Racing					11	33					DNS	9				49
10	(Netherlands) Benjamin van den Berg (Netherlands) Robert van den Berg	(Netherlands) Harders Plaza									16	13						40
11	(Netherlands) Tony Vijfschaft	(Netherlands) Ferry Monster Autosport									18	12						38
12	(Netherlands) Fabian Schoonhoven	(Netherlands) Bas Koeten Racing									21	17						20
Supersport 2
1	(Netherlands) Maik Broerson	(Netherlands) Koopman Racing	**13**	18	20	15	15	16			24	18	16	15	17	17		228
2	(Netherlands) Priscilla Speelman	(Netherlands) Emergo Racing powered by FMA			16	13	**17**	18			**22**	22	**17**	13	**16**	9		204
2	(Netherlands) Teunis van der Grift	(Netherlands) Emergo Racing powered by FMA					**17**	18			**22**	22	**17**	13				204
3	(Belgium) Bart van den Broeck (Belgium) Chris Voet	(Belgium) Traxx Racing Team	27	27	24	18	21	34	12	20	Ret	30	20	18	23	19		149
4	(Netherlands) Jos Harper	(Netherlands) Koopman Racing	25	25	23	20	20	21			34	29	19	20	22	20		134
5	(Netherlands) Bas Barenbrug	(Netherlands) Bas Koeten Racing	DNS	DNS	21	17	18	19					15	15	19	15		134
6	(Belgium) Tony Verhulst	(Belgium) Verhulst Invest Motorsports	19	16	18	16	16	Ret	**10**	Ret	DNS	DNS						114
7	(Netherlands) Andy Dam (Note: Andy Dam competed in the Supersport 1 class in round 1 but switched to Supersport 2 for round 2, his points scored as a Supersport 1 class competitor were kept upon his switch to SS2.)	(Netherlands) Dams Racing	12	15	17	14	Ret	15										90
8	(Netherlands) Maik Broerson	(Netherlands) Koopman Racing	16	23	Ret	23			34	29								55
9	(Netherlands) Yardy Hoogwerf (Belgium) Steven Teirlinck	(Belgium) Team VDB	24	19							28	21						54
10	(Netherlands) Gilles van Houtum	(Netherlands) Koopman Racing	14	17	22	27			Ret	DNS								54
10	(Netherlands) Axel Jansen	(Netherlands) Koopman Racing	14	17	22	27												54
11	(Netherlands) Christian Frankenhout (Netherlands) Meindert van Buuren Jr.	(Netherlands) CP Motorsport by DRDO									23	19						40
12	(Netherlands) Britt van Osta (Belgium) Robin van Osta	(Netherlands) DayVTec							15	13								40
13	(Netherlands) Berry Arendsen (Netherlands) Joop Arendsen	(Netherlands) Koopman Racing			27	19					27	42						32
14	(Netherlands) Patrick de Vreede (Netherlands) Rogier de Leeuw	(Belgium) JJ Motorsport									25	20						32
15	(Netherlands) Andre Seinen	(Netherlands) DayVTec													20	16		32
15	(Netherlands) Daaf Steentjes	(Netherlands) CP Motorsport by DRDO					28	27			37	32						24
15	(Netherlands) Patrick Grootscholten	(Netherlands) CP Motorsport by DRDO					28	27										24
16	(Netherlands) Haso Keric (Netherlands) Semo Keric	(Netherlands) CP Motorsport by DRDO					32	17										18
18	(Netherlands) Jacob Kuil (Netherlands) Mark Wieringa	(Netherlands) Zilhouette Racing													24	25		18
19	(Netherlands) Dennis van der Linden	(Netherlands) Certainty Racing by DRDO					25	24										16
Sport 1
1	(Netherlands) Oscar Vianen	(Netherlands) Zilhouette Racing	**17**	22	DNS	26			19	14			23	21				237
1	(Netherlands) Mark Jobst	(Netherlands) Zilhouette Racing	**17**	22			22	25			31	27			25	21		237
2	(Netherlands) Rob Nieman	(Netherlands) Spirit Racing	22	26			24	23	17	21	32	24	**21**	19	26	24		207
3	(Netherlands) Pieter de Jong (Netherlands) Jack Hoekstra	(Netherlands) Zilhouette Racing	20	21	25	21			**14**	11			22	17	29	23		196
4	(Netherlands) Emile Drummen (Netherlands) Tom Drummen	(Netherlands) Koopman Racing	26	28			29	28			36	28			**27**	22		110
5	(Netherlands) Mick Schutte	(Netherlands) Koopman Racing			28	22			13	12	33	43						94
6	(Netherlands) Jan Berry Drenth	(Netherlands) Zilhouette Racing	18	20	Ret	DNS			16	15								75
7	(Belgium) Wouter Maderveld	(Netherlands) Spirit Racing	23	24			27	26										74
7	(Netherlands) Raymond Koper	(Netherlands) Spirit Racing	23	24							38	34						74
7	(Netherlands) John van der Voort	(Netherlands) Spirit Racing									38	34						74
8	(Netherlands) Mark Wieringa	(Netherlands) Zilhouette Racing			**26**	Ret							18	16				67
9	(Netherlands) Tom Vanderheyden	(Netherlands) Zilhouette Racing							19	14			23	21				58
10	(Netherlands) Bernard Blaak	(Netherlands) Zilhouette Racing	21	Ret	Ret	DNS					30	25						55
10	(Netherlands) Lars Blaak	(Netherlands) Zilhouette Racing	21	Ret	Ret	DNS												55
11	(Netherlands) Dirk Dekker (Netherlands) Koen de Wit	(Netherlands) DRDO									**29**	26						40
12	(Netherlands) Simon Knap	(Netherlands) Spirit Racing									32	24						39
13	(Netherlands) Han Kirchhoff (Note: Han Kirchhoff competed in the Supersport 2 class in round 3 but switched to Sport 1 for round 5, his points scored as a Supersport 2 class competitor were kept upon his switch to SP1.)	(Netherlands) Koopman Racing by DRDO					26	22			35	36						32
14	(Netherlands) Christian Dijkhof	(Netherlands) Spirit Racing							18	16								26
15	(Netherlands) Han Wannet (Note: Han Wannet competed in the Supersport 2 class in round 3 but switched to Sport 1 for round 5, his points scored as a Supersport 2 class competitor were kept upon his switch to SP1.)	(Netherlands) Koopman Racing by DRDO					30	31			39	33						20
16	(Netherlands) Peter Koelewijn	(Netherlands) Koopman Racing by DRDO									DNS	31						11
17	(Netherlands) Martin Wijsman (Note: Martin Wijsman competed in the Supersport 2 class in round 3 but switched to Sport 1 for round 5, his points scored as a Supersport 2 class competitor were kept upon his switch to SP1.)	(Netherlands) Koopman Racing by DRDO					Ret	Ret			Ret	37						3
	(Belgium) Harry Steegmans (Belgium) Peter Sterken	(Belgium) Peter Sterken							DNS	DNS								0
Sport 2
1	(Belgium) Robin Dries (Belgium) Samuel Hilgers	(Belgium) HD Racing					**33**	30										44
2	(Belgium) Leon Iserbyt (Belgium) Ignace van den Broeck	(Belgium) Traxx Racing Team	**28**	29	**29**	24	31	32	**22**	19	**40**	38	**24**	22	**28**	27		43
	(Ukraine) Leonid Protasov	(Ukraine) Protasov Racing			DNS	Ret	DNS	DNS			Ret	41	26	23				0
	(Ukraine) Sergii Pustovoitenko	(Ukraine) Protasov Racing			DNS	Ret	DNS	DNS					26	23				0
Pos.	Driver	Team	(Netherlands) ZAN		(Austria) RBR		(Belgium) SPA		(Belgium) ZOL		(Netherlands) ASS		(Netherlands) ZAN		(Belgium) SPA		(Netherlands) ASS	Points

Key
Colour	Result
Gold	Winner
Silver	Second place
Bronze	Third place
Green	Other points position
Blue	Other classified position
Blue	Not classified, finished (NC)
Purple	Not classified, retired (Ret)
Red	Did not qualify (DNQ)
Red	Did not pre-qualify (DNPQ)
Black	Disqualified (DSQ)
White	Did not start (DNS)
White	Race cancelled (C)
Blank	Did not practice (DNP)
Blank	Excluded (EX)
Blank	Did not arrive (DNA)
Blank	Withdrawn (WD)
Blank	Did not enter (cell empty)
Text formatting	Meaning
**Bold**	Pole position
Italics	Fastest lap
