= 2024 Supercar Challenge =

Twenty-fourth season of the Supercar Challenge

The 2024 Supercar Challenge powered by Hankook was the twenty-fourth Supercar Challenge season since it replaced the Supercar Cup in 2001. It began at Circuit Zandvoort 14 April and ended at TT Circuit Assen on 29 October.

== Calendar ==
Round	Circuit	Date	Event	Notes
1	Circuit Zandvoort, Netherlands	13–14 April	Spring Races	
2	Motorsport Arena Oschersleben, Germany	10–12 May	ADAC Racing Weekend	
3	Circuit de Spa-Francorchamps, Belgium	31 May–2 June	Spa Euro Races	Races contested with Prototype entries.
4	Circuit Zolder, Belgium	5–7 July	Supercar Madness	Races contested without GT entries.
5	TT Circuit Assen, Netherlands	2–4 August	JACK'S Racing Day	Races contested with Prototype entries.
6	Circuit Zandvoort, Netherlands	14–15 September	Trophy of the Dunes	Races contested with Prototype entries.
7	TT Circuit Assen, Netherlands	26–27 October	Supercar Madness Finale Races	Races contested without GT entries.

== Entries ==
Icon	Class
GT	GT class
SS	Supersport class
SP	Sport class

Team	Car	No.	Drivers	Class	Rounds
(Netherlands) Koopman Racing	BMW M6 GT3	105	(Netherlands) Mex Jansen	GT	1-3, 5-6
(Netherlands) Koopman Racing	BMW M6 GT3	105	(Netherlands) Jordin Poland	GT	1-3, 5-6
(Netherlands) Koopman Racing	BMW M6 GT3	150	(Netherlands) Ivar Moens	GT	3
(Netherlands) Koopman Racing	BMW M6 GT3	101	(Netherlands) Bart Arendsen	GT	5
(Netherlands) Koopman Racing	BMW M6 GT3	101	(Netherlands) Joop Arendsen	GT	5
(Netherlands) Koopman Racing	BMW M6 GT3	174	(Netherlands) Jayden Post	GT	5
(Netherlands) Koopman Racing	BMW M4 GT3	149	(Netherlands) Cees Wijsman	GT	1-3, 5
(Netherlands) Koopman Racing	BMW M4 GT3	175	(Netherlands) Max Koebolt	GT	5
(Netherlands) Koopman Racing	BMW M4	232	(Netherlands) Maik Broersen	SS	All
(Netherlands) Koopman Racing	BMW M240i	432	(Netherlands) Emile Drummen	SP	1, 3-7
(Netherlands) Koopman Racing	BMW M240i	432	(Netherlands) Tom Drummen	SP	1, 3-7
(Netherlands) Koopman Racing	BMW M3 GTR	428	(Netherlands) Jos Harper	SP	All
(Netherlands) Koopman Racing	BMW M3 GTR	428	(Netherlands) Frank Broersen	SP	1
(Netherlands) Koopman Racing	BMW M3 GTR	433	(Netherlands) Mick Schutte	SP	5
(Netherlands) Koopman Racing	BMW E46 GTR	224	(Netherlands) Gilles van Houtum	SS	2-3, 6-7
(Netherlands) Koopman Racing	BMW M4 GT4	251	(Netherlands) Martin Wijsman	SS	3. 6
(Netherlands) Koopman Racing	BMW M4 GT4	205	(Netherlands) Mex Jansen	SS	7
(Netherlands) Koopman Racing	BMW M4 GT4	205	(Netherlands) Jordin Poland	SS	7
(Netherlands) Koopman Racing	BMW M3 E46	416	(Netherlands) Dio Poland	SP	3, 5
(Netherlands) Koopman Racing by DRDO	BMW M3 GTR	485	(Netherlands) Martijn Wijsman	SP	5-6
(Netherlands) Boda Racing	BMW M6 GT3	107	(Netherlands) Daan Meijer	GT	1-2, 5-6
(Netherlands) Boda Racing	BMW M6 GT3	107	(Netherlands) Cor Euser	GT	1-2, 5-6
(Netherlands) DayVTec	Ligier JS P3 LMP3	133	(Netherlands) Dane Arendsen	GT	1
(Netherlands) DWS Racing by FMА	Cupra TCR	201	(Netherlands) Laurens de Wit	SS	All
(Netherlands) DWS Racing by FMА	Cupra TCR	201	(Netherlands) Fabian Schoonhoven	SS	All
(Netherlands) Ferry Monster Autosport	Seat TCR	208	(Netherlands) Emely de Heus	SS	1, 5, 7
(Netherlands) Ferry Monster Autosport	Seat TCR	208	(Netherlands) Bert de Heus	SS	5, 7
(Netherlands) Ferry Monster Autosport	Cupra Leon Competition	223	(Netherlands) Teunis van der Grift	SS	1, 7
(Netherlands) Ferry Monster Autosport	Cupra Leon Competition	223	(Netherlands) Tony Vijfschaft	SS	7
(Netherlands) Ferry Monster Autosport	BMW M2	274	(Netherlands) Jayden Post	SS	1
(Netherlands) Ferry Monster Autosport	SEAT León Supercopa	206	(Netherlands) Tony Vijfschaft	SS	5
(Netherlands) Ferry Monster Autosport	Cupra TCR	242	(Netherlands) Robbin Heijerman	SS	5
(Netherlands) Ferry Monster Autosport	Cupra TCR	242	(Netherlands) Matthijs Terlouw	SS	5
(Belgium) Team VDB	Cupra TCR	225	(Netherlands) Yardy Hoogwerf	SS	1, 3, 5
(Netherlands) AKG Motorsport	BMW M4 GT4	226	(Netherlands) Valentijn Greven	SS	1, 3, 5, 7
(Netherlands) AKG Motorsport	BMW M4 GT4	226	(Netherlands) Maxime Oosten	SS	1, 5
(Netherlands) AKG Motorsport	BMW M4 GT4	226	(Netherlands) Max Tubben	SS	3, 7
(Netherlands) AKG Motorsport	BMW 235i	278	(Netherlands) Henri Greven	SP	1, 3, 5
(Netherlands) AKG Motorsport	BMW 235i	278	(Netherlands) Milan Teekens	SP	1, 3, 5
(Netherlands) AKG Motorsport	BMW 235i	426	(Netherlands) Valentijn Greven	SP	7 (R2)
(Netherlands) AKG Motorsport	BMW 235i	426	(Netherlands) Max Tubben	SP	7 (R2)
(Netherlands) AKG Motorsport	Zilhouette	484	(Netherlands) John den Hollander	SP	5
(Netherlands) Racing Team Tappel	Zilhouette 3.0	211	(Netherlands) Henk Tappel	SS	1, 5-7
(Netherlands) Racing Team Tappel	Zilhouette 3.0	211	(Netherlands) Harold Wisselink	SS	1, 5-7
(Netherlands) Emergo Racing pb JWR	VW Golf GTI TCR Int.	207	(Netherlands) Priscilla Speelman	SS	1-3, 5
(Netherlands) Emergo Racing pb JWR	VW Golf GTI TCR Int.	207	(Belgium) Steven Teirlinck	SS	1-3
(Netherlands) Blueberry Racing	BMW M2	222	(Netherlands) Ronald van Loon	SS	1, 4
(Netherlands) Blueberry Racing	BMW M2	222	(Netherlands) Luuk van Loon	SS	1, 4
(Netherlands) Blueberry Racing	BMW M2	273	(Netherlands) Berry van Elk	SS	1, 3, 6-7
(Netherlands) Spirit Racing Team	Renault Clio Evo	401	(Netherlands) Rob Nieman	SP	All
(Netherlands) Spirit Racing Team	Renault Clio Evo	402	(Netherlands) Richard Meester	SP	All
(Netherlands) Niemann Autosport	Cupra TCR	203	(Netherlands) Stefan Barewijk	SS	1, 5-6
(Netherlands) Niemann Autosport	Cupra TCR	203	(Netherlands) Marcel Schoonhoven	SS	1, 5-6
(Belgium) Traxx Racing	Renault Alpine	404	(Belgium) Chris Voet	SP	1-5, 7
(Belgium) Traxx Racing	Renault Alpine	404	(Belgium) Bart van den Broeck	SP	1-5, 7
(United Kingdom) VR Motorsport	Praga R1	111	(United Kingdom) Jack Fabby	GT	3
(United Kingdom) VR Motorsport	Praga R1	111	(United Kingdom) Shane Kelly	GT	3
(United Kingdom) VR Motorsport	Praga R1	116	(United Kingdom) Edward Bridle	GT	5
(United Kingdom) VR Motorsport	Praga R1	116	(United Kingdom) Christopher Bridle	GT	5
(Ukraine) Protasov	BMW Compact E36	460	(Ukraine) Leonid Protasov	SP	3, 6
(Ukraine) Protasov	BMW Compact E36	460	(Ukraine) Sergii Pustovoitenko	SP	3, 6
(Belgium) LVRT Events	BMW M4 GT4	246	(Netherlands) Danny Luyten	SS	4
(Belgium) LVRT Events	BMW M4 GT4	246	(Belgium) Steven Teirlinck	SS	4
(Netherlands) Harders Plaza	Lamborghini Huracán Super Trofeo Evo	120	(Netherlands) Robert van den Berg	GT	5
(Netherlands) Harders Plaza	Lamborghini Huracán Super Trofeo Evo	120	(Netherlands) Benjamin van den Berg	GT	5
(Netherlands) JW Race Service	Audi RS3 TCR	246	(Netherlands) Bas Visser	SS	5, 7
(Netherlands) JW Race Service	Audi RS3 TCR	246	(Belgium) Steven Teirlinck	SS	5, 7
(Netherlands) JW Race Service	Audi RS3 TCR	246	(Netherlands) Pieter van Noordenne	SS	7
(Netherlands) JW Race Service	Cupra TCR	234	(Netherlands) Hassan Arreffag	SS	4, 7
(Netherlands) JW Race Service	Cupra TCR	234	(Netherlands) Mounir Arreffag	SS	4, 7
(Germany) NFR Motorsports	BMW E46 M3	488	(Germany) Paul Heinisch	SP	5
(Netherlands) Dutch Race Driver Organisation	BMW M2	383	(Netherlands) Johan de Rouw	SS	5
(Netherlands) Dutch Race Driver Organisation	BMW M2	382	(Netherlands) Patrick Grootscholten	SS	5
(Netherlands) Dutch Race Driver Organisation	BMW M2	381	(Netherlands) Daaf Steentjes	SS	5
(Netherlands) Just Racing by DRDO	BMW 320d	415	(Netherlands) Bart Walraven	SP	5
(Netherlands) Zilhouette Racing	Zilhouette Sport	310	(Netherlands) Jacob Kuil	SS	5
(Netherlands) Zilhouette Racing	Zilhouette Sport	310	(Netherlands) Raymond Kuil	SS	5
(Netherlands) Zilhouette Racing	Zilhouette Sport	310	(Netherlands) Mark Wieinga	SS	5
(Netherlands) JR Motorsport	BMW M3 F80	146	(Netherlands) Ruud Olij	GT	5-6
(Netherlands) JR Motorsport	BMW E46 M3	233	(Netherlands) Remco de Beus	SS	5-6
(Netherlands) JR Motorsport	BMW E92	228	(Netherlands) Ted van Vliet	SS	6
(Netherlands) MV Motorsport	Golf 7 RS	365	(Netherlands) Arjan Evers	SS	5
(Netherlands) MV Motorsport by DRDO	BMW 1 serie	486	(Netherlands) Kevin Janssen	SP	5
(Netherlands) MV Motorsport by DRDO	BMW 1 serie	489	(Belgium) Frédéric George	SP	5
(Netherlands) Speedsports	Zilhouette Sport	461	(Netherlands) Mark Jobst	SP	6
(Netherlands) Forze Hydrogen Electric Racing	Forze 8	444	(Netherlands) Leo van der Eijk	SP	7
(Netherlands) Forze Hydrogen Electric Racing	Forze 8	444	(Netherlands) Jan Bot	SP	7

== Race results ==
Bold indicates overall winner.

Round		Circuit	GT Winning Car	Supersport Winning Car	Supersport 1 Winning Car	Supersport 2 Winning Car	Sport Winning Car
Round		Circuit	GT Winning Drivers	Supersport Winning Drivers	Supersport 1 Winning Drivers	Supersport 2 Winning Drivers	Sport Winning Drivers
1	R1	(Netherlands) Zandvoort	**(Netherlands) No. 133 DayVTec**	(Netherlands) No. 201 DWS Racing by FMА			(Netherlands) No. 401 Spirit Racing Team
1	R1	(Netherlands) Zandvoort	**(Netherlands) Dane Arendsen**	(Netherlands) Laurens de Wit (Netherlands) Fabian Schoonhoven			(Netherlands) Rob Nieman
1	R2	(Netherlands) Zandvoort	**(Netherlands) No. 105 Koopman Racing**	(Netherlands) No. 201 DWS Racing by FMА			(Netherlands) No. 401 Spirit Racing Team
1	R2	(Netherlands) Zandvoort	(Netherlands) Mex Jansen (Netherlands) Jordin Poland	(Netherlands) Laurens de Wit (Netherlands) Fabian Schoonhoven			(Netherlands) Rob Nieman
2	R1	(Germany) Oschersleben	**(Netherlands) No. 105 Koopman Racing**	(Netherlands) No. 201 DWS Racing by FMА			(Netherlands) No. 401 Spirit Racing Team
2	R1	(Germany) Oschersleben	(Netherlands) Mex Jansen (Netherlands) Jordin Poland	(Netherlands) Laurens de Wit (Netherlands) Fabian Schoonhoven			(Netherlands) Rob Nieman
2	R2	(Germany) Oschersleben	**(Netherlands) No. 105 Koopman Racing**	(Netherlands) No. 201 DWS Racing by FMА			(Netherlands) No. 401 Spirit Racing Team
2	R2	(Germany) Oschersleben	(Netherlands) Mex Jansen (Netherlands) Jordin Poland	(Netherlands) Laurens de Wit (Netherlands) Fabian Schoonhoven			(Netherlands) Rob Nieman
3	R1	(Belgium) Spa-Francorchamps	**(Netherlands) No. 105 Koopman Racing**	(Netherlands) No. 201 DWS Racing by FMА			(Belgium) No. 404 Traxx Racing
3	R1	(Belgium) Spa-Francorchamps	(Netherlands) Mex Jansen (Netherlands) Jordin Poland	(Netherlands) Laurens de Wit (Netherlands) Fabian Schoonhoven			(Belgium) Chris Voet (Belgium) Bart van den Broeck
3	R2	(Belgium) Spa-Francorchamps	**(Netherlands) No. 105 Koopman Racing**	(Netherlands) No. 201 DWS Racing by FMА			(Belgium) No. 404 Traxx Racing
3	R2	(Belgium) Spa-Francorchamps	(Netherlands) Mex Jansen (Netherlands) Jordin Poland	(Netherlands) Laurens de Wit (Netherlands) Fabian Schoonhoven			(Belgium) Chris Voet (Belgium) Bart van den Broeck
4	R1	(Belgium) Zolder		**(Netherlands) No. 201 DWS Racing by FMА**			(Belgium) No. 404 Traxx Racing
4	R1	(Belgium) Zolder		(Netherlands) Laurens de Wit (Netherlands) Fabian Schoonhoven			(Belgium) Chris Voet (Belgium) Bart van den Broeck
4	R2	(Belgium) Zolder		**(Netherlands) No. 201 DWS Racing by FMА**			(Belgium) No. 404 Traxx Racing
4	R2	(Belgium) Zolder		(Netherlands) Laurens de Wit (Netherlands) Fabian Schoonhoven			(Belgium) Chris Voet (Belgium) Bart van den Broeck
5	R1	(Netherlands) Assen	**(Netherlands) No. 105 Koopman Racing**		(Netherlands) No. 206 Ferry Monster Autosport	(Netherlands) No. 383 Dutch Race Driver Organisation	(Germany) No. 488 NFR Motorsports
5	R1	(Netherlands) Assen	(Netherlands) Mex Jansen (Netherlands) Jordin Poland		(Netherlands) Tony Vijfschaft	(Netherlands) Johan de Rouw	(Germany) Paul Heinisch
5	R2	(Netherlands) Assen	**(United Kingdom) No. 116 VR Motorsport**		(Netherlands) No. 211 Racing Team Tappel	(Netherlands) No. 383 Dutch Race Driver Organisation	(Netherlands) No. 432 Koopman Racing
5	R2	(Netherlands) Assen	(United Kingdom) Edward Bridle (United Kingdom) Christopher Bridle		(Netherlands) Henk Tappel (Netherlands) Harold Wisselink	(Netherlands) Johan de Rouw	(Netherlands) Emile Drummen (Netherlands) Tom Drummen
6	R1	(Netherlands) Zandvoort	**(Netherlands) No. 107 Boda Racing**	(Netherlands) No. 246 JR Motorsport			(Netherlands) No. 461 Speedsports
6	R1	(Netherlands) Zandvoort	(Netherlands) Daan Meijer (Netherlands) Cor Euser	(Netherlands) Ruud Olij			(Netherlands) Mark Jobst
6	R2	(Netherlands) Zandvoort	**(Netherlands) No. 105 Koopman Racing**	(Netherlands) No. 211 Racing Team Tappel			(Netherlands) No. 461 Speedsports
6	R2	(Netherlands) Zandvoort	(Netherlands) Mex Jansen (Netherlands) Jordin Poland	(Netherlands) Henk Tappel (Netherlands) Harold Wisselink			(Netherlands) Mark Jobst
7	R1	(Netherlands) Assen		**(Netherlands) No. 205 Koopman Racing**			(Belgium) No. 404 Traxx Racing
7	R1	(Netherlands) Assen		(Netherlands) Mex Jansen (Netherlands) Jordin Poland			(Belgium) Chris Voet (Belgium) Bart van den Broeck
7	R2	(Netherlands) Assen		**(Netherlands) No. 205 Koopman Racing**			(Netherlands) No. 432 Koopman Racing
7	R2	(Netherlands) Assen		(Netherlands) Mex Jansen (Netherlands) Jordin Poland			(Netherlands) Emile Drummen (Netherlands) Tom Drummen

=== Championship standings ===
Position	**1st**	**2nd**	**3rd**	**4th**	**5th**	**6th**	**7th**	**8th**	**9th**	**10th**	**11th**	**Pole**
Points	23	20	17	15	13	11	9	7	5	3	1	1

Pos.	Driver	Team	(Netherlands) ZAN		(Germany) OSC		(Belgium) SPA		(Belgium) ZOL		(Netherlands) ASS		(Netherlands) ZAN		(Netherlands) ASS		Points
GT
1	(Netherlands) Mex Jansen (Netherlands) Jordin Poland	(Netherlands) Koopman Racing	2	1	**1**	1	**1**	1			1	3	2	1			200
2	(Netherlands) Daan Meijer (Netherlands) Cor Euser	(Netherlands) Boda Racing	3	2	2	RET					9	5	1	2			95
3	(Netherlands) Cees Wijsman	(Netherlands) Koopman Racing	4	3	3	2	RET	DNS			7	RET					78
4	(United Kingdom) Ed Bridle (United Kingdom) Chris Bridle	(United Kingdom) VR Motorsport									**3**	1					41
5	(Netherlands) Max Koebolt	(Netherlands) Koopman Racing									2	2					40
6	(Netherlands) Dane Arendsen	(Netherlands) DayVTec	**1**	4													39
7	(Netherlands) Ivar Moens	(Netherlands) Koopman Racing					3	2									37
8	(Netherlands) Ruud Olij	(Netherlands) JR Motorsport									8	8		3			31
9	(Netherlands) Robert van den Berg (Netherlands) Benjamin van den Berg	(Netherlands) Harders Plaza									4	6					26
10	(Netherlands) Jayden Post	(Netherlands) Koopman Racing									6	4					26
11	(Netherlands) Bart Arendsen (Netherlands) Joop Arendsen	(Netherlands) Koopman Racing									5	7					22
12	(United Kingdom) Jack Fabby (United Kingdom) Shane Kelly	(United Kingdom) VR Motorsport					2	RET									20
Supersport
1	(Netherlands) Laurens de Wit (Netherlands) Fabian Schoonhoven	(Netherlands) DWS Racing by FMА	1	1	**1**	1	1	1	**1**	1	5	4	2	2	4	2	289
2	(Netherlands) Maik Broersen	(Netherlands) Koopman Racing	9	9	2	2	5	6	2	3	6	6	3	4	5	4	193
3	(Belgium) Steven Teirlinck	(Netherlands) Emergo Racing pb JWR (Belgium) LVRT Events (Netherlands) JW Race Service	7	4	3	3	3	RET	5	5	8	11					109
4	(Netherlands) Berry van Elk	(Netherlands) Blueberry Racing	11	10			2	3	4	2			6	RET	7	8	103
5	(Netherlands) Priscilla Speelman	(Netherlands) Emergo Racing pb JWR	7	4	3	3	3	RET			10	3					95
6	(Netherlands) Emely de Heus	(Netherlands) Ferry Monster Autosport	2	5							2	5			2	RET	86
7	(Netherlands) Henk Tappel (Netherlands) Harold Wisselink	(Netherlands) Racing Team Tappel	6	7							RET	1	DNS	1	RET	3	83
8	(Netherlands) Gilles van Houtum	(Netherlands) Koopman Racing			RET	RET	6	4					4	3	6	7	78
9	(Netherlands) Valentijn Greven (Netherlands) Maxime Oosten (Netherlands) Max Tubben	(Netherlands) AKG Motorsport	**5**	2			**4**	RET			11	2			**11**		72
10	(Netherlands) Yardy Hoogwerf	(Belgium) Team VDB	3	6			RET	2			3	12					65
11	(Netherlands) Teunis van der Grift	(Netherlands) Ferry Monster Autosport	4	3					DNS	DNS					3	5	62
12	(Netherlands) Tony Vijfschaft	(Netherlands) Ferry Monster Autosport									1	7			3	5	62
13	(Netherlands) Mex Jansen (Netherlands) Jordin Poland	(Netherlands) Koopman Racing													**1**	1	46
14	(Netherlands) Stefan Barewijk (Netherlands) Marcel Schoonhoven	(Netherlands) Niemann Autosport	12	12							7	4	8	6			42
15	(Netherlands) Ronald van Loon (Netherlands) Luuk van Loon	(Netherlands) Blueberry Racing	10	11					3	4							36
16	(Netherlands) Danny Luyten	(Belgium) LVRT Events							5	5							26
17	(Netherlands) Bas Visser	(Netherlands) JW Race Service									8	11			8	11	26
18	(Netherlands) Remco de Beus	(Netherlands) JR Motorsport									9	7	5	RET			25
19	(Netherlands) Ruud Olij	(Netherlands) JR Motorsport											**1**				24
20	(Netherlands) Martijn Wijsman	(Netherlands) Koopman Racing					7	5									22
21	(Netherlands) Ted van Vliet	(Netherlands) JR Motorsport											7	5			22
22	(Netherlands) Robbin Heijerman (Netherlands) Matthijs Terlouw	(Netherlands) Ferry Monster Autosport									4	9					20
23	(Netherlands) Pieter van Noordenne	(Netherlands) JW Race Service													8	6	18
24	(Netherlands) Jayden Post	(Netherlands) Ferry Monster Autosport	8	8													14
25	(Netherlands) Hassan Arreffag (Netherlands) Mounir Arreffag	(Netherlands) JW Race Service							RET	DNS					RET	DNS	0
Sport
1	(Netherlands) Rob Nieman	(Netherlands) Spirit Racing Team	1	1	**1**	1	2	2	2	2	2	RET	2	2	2	2	273
2	(Belgium) Chris Voet (Belgium) Bart van den Broeck	(Belgium) Traxx Racing	RET	2	2	3	1	1	**1**	1	4	10			1	4	206
3	(Netherlands) Emile Drummen (Netherlands) Tom Drummen	(Netherlands) Koopman Racing	3	4			3	3	4	3	10	1	**6**	4	**3**	1	192
4	(Netherlands) Jos Harper	(Netherlands) Koopman Racing	RET	3	3	2	5	5	DNS	4	5	3	5	3	4	6	181
5	(Netherlands) Richard Meester	(Netherlands) Spirit Racing Team	RET	6	4	4	DNS	DNS	3	5	13	8	4	6	5	5	130
6	(Netherlands) Henri Greven (Netherlands) Milan Teekens	(Netherlands) AKG Motorsport	**2**	5			**6**	4			**7**	7					80
7	(Netherlands) Martijn Wijsman	(Netherlands) Koopman Racing by DRDO									8	2	3	5			57
8	(Netherlands) Mark Jobst	(Netherlands) Speedsports											1	1			46
9	(Netherlands) Mike Schutte	(Netherlands) Koopman Racing									3	4					32
10	(Netherlands) Dio Poland	(Netherlands) Koopman Racing					4	7			9	12					29
11	(Germany) Paul Heinisch	(Germany) NFR Motorsports									1	11					24
12	(Netherlands) John den Hollander	(Netherlands) AKG Motorsport									6	5					24
13	(Netherlands) Valentijn Greven (Netherlands) Max Tubben	(Netherlands) AKG Motorsport														3	17
14	(Netherlands) Bart Walraven	(Netherlands) Just Racing by DRDO									11	6					12
15	(Ukraine) Leonid Protasov (Ukraine) Sergii Pustovoitenko	(Ukraine) Protasov					RET	6					DNS	DNS			11
16	(Netherlands) Kevin Janssen	(Netherlands) MV Motorsport by DRDO									12	9					5
17	(Belgium) Frederic George	(Netherlands) MV Motorsport by DRDO									RET	DNS					0
18	(Netherlands) Leo van der Eijk (Netherlands) Jan Bot	(Netherlands) Forze Hydrogen Electric Racing													DNS	DNS	0
