= 2022 Supercar Challenge =

Car racing competition

The 2022 Supercar Challenge powered by Hankook was the twenty-second Supercar Challenge season since it replaced the Supercar Cup in 2001. It began at Circuit Zandvoort 9 April and ended at TT Circuit Assen on 30 October.

== Calendar ==
Round	Circuit	Date	Event	Notes
1	Circuit Zandvoort, Netherlands	8–10 April	Spring Races	Both races contested with Sports Prototype Cup entries.
2	Hockenheimring, Germany	13–15 May		Supporting 2022 12 Hours of Hockenheimring.
3	Circuit Zolder, Belgium	10–12 June	Supercar Madness	
4	Circuit de Spa-Francorchamps, Belgium	15–17 July	Spa Euro Races	Both races contested with Sports Prototype Cup entries.
5	TT Circuit Assen, Netherlands	5–7 August	JACK'S Racing Day	
6	Circuit Zandvoort, Netherlands	30 September–2 October	Autumn Races	
7	Circuit de Spa-Francorchamps, Belgium	14–16 October	Racing Festival	Both races contested with BMW M2 CS Racing Cup Netherlands and Benelux competitors.
8	TT Circuit Assen, Netherlands	28–30 October	Hankook Finale Races	

== Entry list ==
Team	Car	No.	Drivers	Class	Rounds
(Netherlands) Cor Euser Racing	MARC II V8	100	(Netherlands) Cor Euser	GT	5
(Netherlands) BODA Racing	Bentley Continental GT3	101	(Netherlands) Bob Herber	GT	1–3, 5–6
(Netherlands) BODA Racing	Lamborghini Huracán Super Trofeo Evo	101	(Netherlands) Bob Herber	GT	8
(Netherlands) BODA Racing	BMW M6 GT3	107	(Netherlands) Daan Meijer	GT	1–3
(Netherlands) Zilhouette Racing	BMW Z4 Zilhouette GTR	111	(Netherlands) Max Tubben	GT	1–7
(Netherlands) Zilhouette Racing	Zilhouette Sport	410	(Netherlands) Mark Wieringa	SP	1–2, 4–5, 8
(Netherlands) Zilhouette Racing	Zilhouette Sport	411	(Netherlands) Jacob Kuil	SP	2
(Netherlands) Zilhouette Racing	Zilhouette Sport	420	(Netherlands) David Emaar	SP	6, 8
(Netherlands) Zilhouette Racing	Zilhouette Sport	420	(Netherlands) Oscar Vianen	SP	6, 8
(Netherlands) Zilhouette Racing	Zilhouette Sport	420	(Netherlands) Walter Zijlstra	SP	8
(Netherlands) Zilhouette Racing	Zilhouette Sport	461	(Netherlands) Mark Jobst	SP	All
(Netherlands) Zilhouette Racing	Zilhouette Sport	469	(Netherlands) Jan Berry Drenth	SP	2–3, 5–6, 8
(Netherlands) Zilhouette Racing	Zilhouette Sport	469	(Netherlands) Martin West	SP	8
(Netherlands) Zilhouette Racing	Zilhouette Sport	481	(Netherlands) Bernard Blaak	SP	1–2, 4–6, 8
(Netherlands) Zilhouette Racing	Zilhouette Sport	481	(Netherlands) Lars Blaak	SP	1, 8
(Netherlands) Zilhouette Racing	Zilhouette Sport	496	(Netherlands) Marcel van der Lyke	SP	1, 3–5, 8
(Netherlands) Zilhouette Racing	Zilhouette Sport	498	(Netherlands) Pieter de Jong	SP	2–3, 5–6, 8
(Netherlands) Zilhouette Racing	Zilhouette Sport	498	(Netherlands) Jack Hoekstra	SP	2–3, 6, 8
(Netherlands) JR Motorsport	BMW M6 GT3	108	(Netherlands) Ted van Vliet	GT	6–8
(Netherlands) JR Motorsport	BMW M6 GT3	108	(Netherlands) Bas Schouten	GT	7
(Netherlands) JR Motorsport	BMW M6 GT3	108	(Netherlands) Dirk Schouten	GT	8
(Netherlands) JR Motorsport	BMW M6 GT3	111	(Netherlands) Max Tubben	GT	8
(Netherlands) JR Motorsport	BMW M3 E92 V8	208	(Netherlands) Ted van Vliet	SS1	2
(Netherlands) JR Motorsport	BMW M3 E46	214	(Netherlands) Bas Schouten	SS1	8
(Netherlands) JR Motorsport	BMW M3 E46	214	(Netherlands) Niek Schouten	SS1	8
(Netherlands) JR Motorsport	BMW M3 E46	233	(Netherlands) Remco de Beus	SS1	8
(Austria) MZR Racing	KTM X-Bow GTX	112	(Switzerland) Martin Koch	GT	6
(Austria) MZR Racing	KTM X-Bow GTX	113	(Austria) Bob Bau	GT	6
(Belgium) Speedlover	Porsche 992 GT3 Cup	119	(Netherlands) Jaxon Verhoeven	GT	7
(Belgium) Speedlover	Porsche 992 GT3 Cup	119	(Netherlands) Jean-Pierre Verhoeven	GT	7
(Belgium) Total Plan Racing Team	Lamborghini Huracán Super Trofeo Evo	120	(Belgium) Brent Verheyen	GT	4
(Belgium) Total Plan Racing Team	Lamborghini Huracán Super Trofeo Evo	120	(Belgium) Cédric Wauters	GT	4
(Belgium) Total Plan Racing Team	Lamborghini Huracán Super Trofeo Evo	122	(Belgium) Kenneth Lenthout	GT	4
(Belgium) Total Plan Racing Team	Lamborghini Huracán Super Trofeo Evo	122	(Belgium) Mario Martlé	GT	4
(Senegal) Domec Racing	Radical RXC GT3	121	(France) "Steve Brooks"	GT	1–3, 5–7
(Senegal) Domec Racing	Radical RXC GT3	121	(Netherlands) Patrick Engelen	GT	1–3, 5
(Senegal) Domec Racing	Radical RXC Spyder	202	(Senegal) Nagy Kabaz	SS1	3, 7
(Netherlands) Koopman Racing	BMW M6 GT3	123	(Netherlands) Mex Jansen	GT	5–8
(Netherlands) Koopman Racing	BMW M6 GT3	149	(Netherlands) Cees Wjisman	GT	All
(Netherlands) Koopman Racing	BMW M6 GT3	150	(Netherlands) Ivor Moens	GT	3–5
(Netherlands) Koopman Racing	BMW M6 GT3	193	(Netherlands) Bart Arendsen	GT	All
(Netherlands) Koopman Racing	BMW Z4 GT3	190	(Netherlands) Hein Koopman	GT	All
(Netherlands) Koopman Racing	BMW Z4 GT3	191	(Germany) Peter Posavac	GT	1, 5
(Netherlands) Koopman Racing	BMW M6 GT3	191	(Germany) Peter Posavac	GT	8
(Netherlands) Koopman Racing	BMW M4 GT4	321	(Netherlands) Frank Broerson	SS2	2–7
(Netherlands) Koopman Racing	BMW M4 GT4	323	(Netherlands) Maik Broerson	SS2	1–4, 6–8
(Netherlands) Koopman Racing	BMW M4 GT4	323	(Netherlands) Frank Broerson	SS2	1
(Netherlands) Koopman Racing	BMW M3 E46 GTR V8	324	(Netherlands) Gilles van Houten	SS2	4, 6, 8
(Netherlands) Koopman Racing	BMW 1 Series GTR	336	(Netherlands) Berry Arendsen	SS2	3–6, 8
(Netherlands) Koopman Racing	BMW 1 Series GTR	336	(Netherlands) Joop Arendsen	SS2	3–6, 8
(Netherlands) Koopman Racing	BMW M3 E46 GTR	431	(Netherlands) Jos Harper	SP	3, 5–8
(Netherlands) Koopman Racing	BMW M240i Racing	432	(Netherlands) Axel Jansen	SP	3–5, 8
(Netherlands) Koopman Racing	BMW M240i Racing	432	(Netherlands) Mex Jansen	SP	3–4
(Netherlands) Koopman Racing	BMW M3 E46	433	(Netherlands) Mick Schutte	SP	3–6
(Netherlands) Team RaceArt	Nissan GT-R Nismo GT3	187	(Netherlands) Jules Grouwels	GT	8
(Netherlands) Team RaceArt	Nissan GT-R Nismo GT3	188	(Netherlands) Roger Grouwels	GT	1–6
(Netherlands) Team RaceArt	Bentley Continental GT3	188	(Netherlands) Roger Grouwels	GT	7–8
(Netherlands) FEBO Racing Team	Hyundai i30 N TCR	201	(Netherlands) Dennis de Borst	SS1	All
(Netherlands) FEBO Racing Team	Hyundai i30 N TCR	201	(Netherlands) Oscar Gräper	SS1	1–5
(Netherlands) FEBO Racing Team	Hyundai i30 N TCR	201	(Netherlands) Stan van Oord	SS1	6–8
(Netherlands) Ferry Monster Autosport	CUPRA León TCR	206	(Netherlands) Tony Vijfschaft	SS1	5
(Netherlands) Ferry Monster Autosport	Volkswagen Golf GTI TCR	264	(Belgium) Jonas de Kimpe	SS1	4–6
(Netherlands) Ferry Monster Autosport	Volkswagen Golf GTI TCR	264	(Netherlands) Priscilla Speelman	SS1	4–6
(Netherlands) Ferry Monster Autosport	CUPRA León TCR	320	(Netherlands) Ferry Monster	SS2	1
(Netherlands) Ferry Monster Autosport	CUPRA León TCR	320	(Netherlands) Teunis van der Grift	SS2	1
(Netherlands) Ferry Monster Autosport	Volkswagen Golf GTI TCR	320	(Netherlands) Teunis van der Grift	SS2	8
(Netherlands) Ferry Monster Autosport	BMW M2 ClubSport Racing	374	(Netherlands) Jaydon Post	SS2	4
(Netherlands) Ferry Monster Autosport	Renault Clio IV	421	(Netherlands) Steff de Borst	SP	5
(Netherlands) Ferry Monster Autosport	Renault Clio IV	421	(Netherlands) Lorenzo van Riet	SP	5
(Netherlands) Racing Team Tappel	BMW M3 E90	211	(Netherlands) Henk Tappel	SS1	1, 8
(Netherlands) Racing Team Tappel	BMW M3 E90	211	(Netherlands) Harold Wisselink	SS1	1, 8
(Netherlands) Racing Team Tappel	BMW Z4 Zilhouette	211	(Netherlands) Henk Tappel	SS1	3, 5–6
(Netherlands) Racing Team Tappel	BMW Z4 Zilhouette	211	(Netherlands) Harold Wisselink	SS1	3, 6
(Germany) Pricon Racing	BMW M3 E90	222	(Germany) Marco Petry	SS1	6
(Germany) Pricon Racing	BMW M3 E90	222	(Germany) Jan von Kiedrowski	SS1	6
(Netherlands) MWR Racing	BMW M3 E46	233	(Netherlands) Remco de Beus	SS1	1–2, 4–7
(Netherlands) MWR Racing	BMW M3 E46	233	(Netherlands) Bas Schouten	SS1	5
(Netherlands) MV Motorsport	Radical SR1	234	(Netherlands) Melvin van Dam	SS1	1, 6
(Netherlands) MV Motorsport	Radical SR1	234	(Netherlands) Eddie van Dam	SS1	1
(Netherlands) Certainty Racing Team	Audi RS3 LMS TCR	244	(Netherlands) Dillon Koster	SS1	6–7
(Netherlands) Certainty Racing Team	Audi RS3 LMS TCR	244	(Netherlands) Paul Meijer	SS1	6
(Netherlands) Certainty Racing Team	Audi RS3 LMS TCR	244	(Netherlands) Tim Schulte	SS1	7
(Netherlands) Certainty Racing Team	BMW M3 E46	357	(Netherlands) Dennis van der Linden	SS2	7
(Netherlands) HBR Motorsport	BMW M3 E90	245	(Netherlands) Benjamin van den Berg	SS1	1
(Netherlands) HBR Motorsport	BMW M3 E90	245	(Netherlands) Robert van den Berg	SS1	1
(Netherlands) Euro Autosport Foundation	BMW M3 E92 V8	246	(Netherlands) Ruud Olij	SS1	1
(Netherlands) Bas Koeten Racing (Netherlands) Technova College Racing	Audi RS3 LMS TCR	280	(Belgium) Michaël De Keersmaecker	SS1	3
(Netherlands) Bas Koeten Racing (Netherlands) Technova College Racing	CUPRA León TCR	333	(Netherlands) Laurens de Wit	SS2	1, 3–8
(Netherlands) Bas Koeten Racing (Netherlands) Technova College Racing	BMW M3 E36	490	(Netherlands) Bas Barenbrug	SP	All
(Netherlands) Johan Kraan Motorsport	BMW M240i	305	(United Kingdom) Jerome Greenhalgh	SS2	1
(Netherlands) Johan Kraan Motorsport	BMW M240i	305	(United Kingdom) Robin Greenhalgh	SS2	1
(Netherlands) DayVTec	BMW 240i	309	(Netherlands) André Seinen	SS2	7
(Netherlands) DayVTec	BMW 240i	309	(Netherlands) Mark Seinen	SS2	7
(Netherlands) DayVTec	BMW 240i	310	(Netherlands) Jan-Willem van Stee	SS2	7
(Netherlands) JW Race Service	CUPRA León TCR	320	(Netherlands) Hassan Arreffag	SS2	3, 5
(Netherlands) JW Race Service	CUPRA León TCR	320	(Netherlands) Mounir Arreffag	SS2	3, 5
(Belgium) ProMare Racing	Lotus Exige S2	327	(Belgium) John Engelborghs	SS2	All
(Netherlands) DRDO (Netherlands) DRDO by Koopman Racing (Netherlands) DRDO by RofChade Racing	CUPRA León TCR	343	(Spain) Jacobo Garcia	SS2	7
(Netherlands) DRDO (Netherlands) DRDO by Koopman Racing (Netherlands) DRDO by RofChade Racing	CUPRA León TCR	343	(Netherlands) Ton Janus	SS2	7
(Netherlands) DRDO (Netherlands) DRDO by Koopman Racing (Netherlands) DRDO by RofChade Racing	BMW M3 E46	351	(Netherlands) Peter Koelewijn	SS2	7
(Netherlands) DRDO (Netherlands) DRDO by Koopman Racing (Netherlands) DRDO by RofChade Racing	BMW M3 E46	352	(Netherlands) Han Kirhoff	SS2	7
(Netherlands) DRDO (Netherlands) DRDO by Koopman Racing (Netherlands) DRDO by RofChade Racing	BMW M3 E46	353	(Netherlands) Han Wannet	SS2	7
(Netherlands) DRDO (Netherlands) DRDO by Koopman Racing (Netherlands) DRDO by RofChade Racing	BMW M3 E46	354	(Netherlands) Wessel Sandkuijl	SS2	7
(Netherlands) DRDO (Netherlands) DRDO by Koopman Racing (Netherlands) DRDO by RofChade Racing	BMW M3 E46	355	(Netherlands) Emile Drummen	SS2	7
(Netherlands) DRDO (Netherlands) DRDO by Koopman Racing (Netherlands) DRDO by RofChade Racing	BMW M3 E46	356	(Netherlands) Ronald Freiderich	SS2	7
(Netherlands) DRDO (Netherlands) DRDO by Koopman Racing (Netherlands) DRDO by RofChade Racing	BMW M3 E36	442	(Netherlands) Jaxon Verhoeven	SP	7
(Netherlands) DRDO (Netherlands) DRDO by Koopman Racing (Netherlands) DRDO by RofChade Racing	BMW M3 E36	442	(Netherlands) Jean-Pierre Verhoeven	SP	7
(Netherlands) DRDO (Netherlands) DRDO by Koopman Racing (Netherlands) DRDO by RofChade Racing	Lotus Elise	445	(Netherlands) Theo Visser	SP	7
(Belgium) JJ Motorsport	BMW M2 ClubSport Racing	335	(Netherlands) Patrick de Vreede	SS2	5
(Belgium) JJ Motorsport	BMW M2 ClubSport Racing	335	(Netherlands) Rogier de Leeuw	SS2	5
(Belgium) JJ Motorsport	BMW 330i	434	(Belgium) Tom Werckx	SP	3
(Netherlands) Verhulst Invest Motorsports	Honda Civic Type R TCR (FK2)	339	(Netherlands) Tony Verhulst	SS2	1–4, 6–7
(Belgium) Xwift Racing Events	Ligier JS2 R	366	(Belgium) Tim de Borle	SS2	All
(Belgium) Xwift Racing Events	Ligier JS2 R	366	(Belgium) Pieter Denis	SS2	1–4, 7
(Belgium) Xwift Racing Events	Ligier JS2 R	366	(Belgium) Esteban Muth	SS2	5
(Belgium) Traxx Racing Team	Peugeot RCZ Cup	401	(Belgium) Bart van den Broeck	SP	All
(Belgium) Traxx Racing Team	Peugeot RCZ Cup	401	(Belgium) Chris Voet	SP	All
(Netherlands) AKG Motorsport	Zilhouette Sport	407	(Netherlands) John den Hollander	SP	5
(Italy) Scuderia Tactile	Abarth 500	444	(Italy) Mauro Mercuri	SP	3
(Italy) Scuderia Tactile	Abarth 500	444	(Belgium) Bjorn Vinen	SP	3

Icon	Class
GT	GT class
SS1	Supersport 1 class
SS2	Supersport 2 class
SP	Sport class

== Race results ==
Bold indicates overall winner.

Round		Circuit	GT Winning Car	Supersport 1 Winning Car	Supersport 2 Winning Car	Sport Winning Car
Round		Circuit	GT Winning Drivers	Supersport 1 Winning Drivers	Supersport 2 Winning Drivers	Sport Winning Drivers
1	R1	(Netherlands) Zandvoort	(Netherlands) No. 193 Koopman Racing	(Netherlands) No. 201 FEBO Racing Team	(Netherlands) No. 333 Technova College Racing	(Netherlands) No. 410 Zilhouette Racing
1	R1	(Netherlands) Zandvoort	(Netherlands) Bart Arendsen	(Netherlands) Dennis de Borst (Netherlands) Oscar Gräper	(Netherlands) Laurens de Wit	(Netherlands) Mark Wieringa
1	R2	(Netherlands) Zandvoort	(Netherlands) No. 107 BODA Racing	(Netherlands) No. 201 FEBO Racing Team	(Netherlands) No. 333 Technova College Racing	(Netherlands) No. 461 Zilhouette Racing
1	R2	(Netherlands) Zandvoort	(Netherlands) Daan Meijer	(Netherlands) Dennis de Borst (Netherlands) Oscar Gräper	(Netherlands) Laurens de Wit	(Netherlands) Mark Jobst
2	R1	(Germany) Hockenheimring	(Netherlands) No. 107 BODA Racing	(Netherlands) No. 208 JR Motorsport	(Netherlands) No. 339 Verhulst Invest Motorsports	(Netherlands) No. 481 Zilhouette Racing
2	R1	(Germany) Hockenheimring	(Netherlands) Daan Meijer	(Netherlands) Ted van Vliet	(Netherlands) Tony Verhulst	(Netherlands) Bernard Blaak
2	R2	(Germany) Hockenheimring	(Netherlands) No. 101 BODA Racing	(Netherlands) No. 208 JR Motorsport	(Netherlands) No. 339 Verhulst Invest Motorsports	(Netherlands) No. 410 Zilhouette Racing
2	R2	(Germany) Hockenheimring	(Netherlands) Bob Herber	(Netherlands) Ted van Vliet	(Netherlands) Tony Verhulst	(Netherlands) Mark Wieringa
3	R1	(Belgium) Zolder	(Netherlands) No. 188 Team RaceArt	(Netherlands) No. 280 Bas Koeten Racing	(Netherlands) No. 333 Technova College Racing	(Netherlands) No. 461 Zilhouette Racing
3	R1	(Belgium) Zolder	(Netherlands) Roger Grouwels	(Belgium) Michaël De Keersmaecker	(Netherlands) Laurens de Wit	(Netherlands) Mark Jobst
3	R2	(Belgium) Zolder	(Netherlands) No. 188 Team RaceArt	(Netherlands) No. 201 FEBO Racing Team	(Belgium) No. 366 Xwift Racing Events	(Belgium) No. 401 Traxx Racing Team
3	R2	(Belgium) Zolder	(Netherlands) Roger Grouwels	(Netherlands) Dennis de Borst	(Belgium) Pieter Denis (Belgium) Tim de Borle	(Belgium) Bart van den Broeck (Belgium) Chris Voet
4	R1	(Belgium) Spa-Francorchamps	(Netherlands) No. 193 Koopman Racing	(Netherlands) No. 201 FEBO Racing Team	(Netherlands) No. 374 Ferry Monster Autosport	(Netherlands) No. 481 Zilhouette Racing
4	R1	(Belgium) Spa-Francorchamps	(Netherlands) Bart Arendsen	(Netherlands) Dennis de Borst (Netherlands) Oscar Gräper	(Netherlands) Jaydon Post	(Netherlands) Bernard Blaak
4	R2	(Belgium) Spa-Francorchamps	(Netherlands) No. 193 Koopman Racing	(Netherlands) No. 201 FEBO Racing Team	(Netherlands) No. 374 Ferry Monster Autosport	(Netherlands) No. 490 Bas Koeten Racing
4	R2	(Belgium) Spa-Francorchamps	(Netherlands) Bart Arendsen	(Netherlands) Dennis de Borst (Netherlands) Oscar Gräper	(Netherlands) Jaydon Post	(Netherlands) Bas Barenbrug
5	R1	(Netherlands) Assen	(Netherlands) No. 123 Koopman Racing	(Netherlands) No. 206 Ferry Monster Autosport	(Belgium) No. 366 Xwift Racing Events	(Netherlands) No. 461 Zilhouette Racing
5	R1	(Netherlands) Assen	(Netherlands) Mex Jansen	(Netherlands) Tony Vijfschaft	(Belgium) Tim de Borle (Belgium) Esteban Muth	(Netherlands) Mark Jobst
5	R2	(Netherlands) Assen	(Netherlands) No. 193 Koopman Racing	(Netherlands) No. 206 Ferry Monster Autosport	(Netherlands) No. 333 Technova College Racing	(Netherlands) No. 481 Zilhouette Racing
5	R2	(Netherlands) Assen	(Netherlands) Bart Arendsen	(Netherlands) Tony Vijfschaft	(Netherlands) Laurens de Wit	(Netherlands) Bernard Blaak
6	R1	(Netherlands) Zandvoort	(Netherlands) No. 123 Koopman Racing	(Netherlands) No. 234 MV Motorsport	(Netherlands) No. 324 Koopman Racing	(Netherlands) No. 461 Zilhouette Racing
6	R1	(Netherlands) Zandvoort	(Netherlands) Mex Jansen	(Netherlands) Melvin van Dam	(Netherlands) Gilles van Houten	(Netherlands) Mark Jobst
6	R2	(Netherlands) Zandvoort	(Netherlands) No. 123 Koopman Racing	(Netherlands) No. 201 FEBO Racing Team	(Netherlands) No. 333 Technova College Racing	(Netherlands) No. 469 Zilhouette Racing
6	R2	(Netherlands) Zandvoort	(Netherlands) Mex Jansen	(Netherlands) Dennis de Borst (Netherlands) Stan van Oord	(Netherlands) Laurens de Wit	(Netherlands) Jan Berry Drenth
7	R1	(Belgium) Spa-Francorchamps	(Netherlands) No. 193 Koopman Racing	(Netherlands) No. 201 FEBO Racing Team	(Netherlands) No. 333 Technova College Racing	(Netherlands) No. 461 Zilhouette Racing
7	R1	(Belgium) Spa-Francorchamps	(Netherlands) Bart Arendsen	(Netherlands) Dennis de Borst (Netherlands) Stan van Oord	(Netherlands) Laurens de Wit	(Netherlands) Mark Jobst
7	R2	(Belgium) Spa-Francorchamps	(Netherlands) No. 193 Koopman Racing	(Netherlands) No. 201 FEBO Racing Team	(Netherlands) No. 333 Technova College Racing	(Belgium) No. 401 Traxx Racing Team
7	R2	(Belgium) Spa-Francorchamps	(Netherlands) Bart Arendsen	(Netherlands) Dennis de Borst (Netherlands) Stan van Oord	(Netherlands) Laurens de Wit	(Belgium) Bart van den Broeck (Belgium) Chris Voet
8	R1	(Netherlands) Assen	(Netherlands) No. 111 JR Motorsport	(Netherlands) No. 233 JR Motorsport	(Netherlands) No. 320 Ferry Monster Autosport	(Netherlands) No. 498 Zilhouette Racing
8	R1	(Netherlands) Assen	(Netherlands) Max Tubben	(Netherlands) Remco de Beus	(Netherlands) Teunis van der Grift	(Netherlands) Pieter de Jong (Netherlands) Jack Hoekstra
8	R2	(Netherlands) Assen	(Netherlands) No. 123 Koopman Racing	(Netherlands) No. 201 FEBO Racing Team	(Netherlands) No. 324 Koopman Racing	(Netherlands) No. 481 Zilhouette Racing
8	R2	(Netherlands) Assen	(Netherlands) Mex Jansen	(Netherlands) Dennis de Borst (Netherlands) Stan van Oord	(Netherlands) Gilles van Houten	(Netherlands) Bernard Blaak (Netherlands) Lars Blaak

=== Championship standings ===
Position	**1st**	**2nd**	**3rd**	**4th**	**5th**	**6th**	**7th**	**8th**	**9th**	**10th**	**11th**	**Pole**
Points	23	20	17	15	13	11	9	7	5	3	1	1

Pos.	Driver	Team	(Netherlands) ZAN		(Germany) HOC		(Belgium) ZOL		(Belgium) SPA		(Netherlands) ASS		(Netherlands) ZAN		(Belgium) SPA		(Netherlands) ASS		Points
GT
1	(Netherlands) Bart Arendsen	(Netherlands) Koopman Racing	**1**	3	**4**	3	**6**	4	**4**	6	7	3	2	2	**1**	1	**4**	Ret	313
2	(Netherlands) Roger Grouwels	(Netherlands) Team RaceArt	2	6	8	4	5	2	5	9	**6**	5	WD	WD	Ret	2	6	9	232
3	(Netherlands) Hein Koopman	(Netherlands) Koopman Racing	11	7	9	6	9	6	11	15	10	6	4	6	4	6	8	10	202
4	(Netherlands) Max Tubben	(Netherlands) Zilhouette Racing	3	20	3	Ret	22	Ret	9	11	9	7	32	3	33	3	3	4	198
5	(Netherlands) Bob Herber	(Netherlands) BODA Racing	24	4	7	2	7	3			5	30	3	4			10	7	180
6	(Netherlands) Mex Jansen	(Netherlands) Koopman Racing									4	14	**1**	1	2	4	6	3	152
7	(Netherlands) Cees Wjisman	(Netherlands) Koopman Racing	20	14	10	9	16	9	22	Ret	24	8	6	7	WD	WD	11	12	117
8	(Netherlands) Ted van Vliet	(Netherlands) JR Motorsport											7	8	3	5	5	8	78
9	(France) "Steve Brooks"	(Senegal) Domec Racing	23	12	DNS	DNS	8	7			Ret	Ret	8	18	6	9			76
9	(Netherlands) Patrick Englen	(Senegal) Domec Racing	23	12	DNS	DNS	8	7			Ret	Ret							76
10	(Netherlands) Daan Meijer	(Netherlands) BODA Racing	4	2	2	5	DNS	DNS											76
11	(Netherlands) Cor Euser	(Netherlands) Cor Euser Racing									8	4							33
12	(Netherlands) Dirk Schouten	(Netherlands) JR Motorsport															5	8	32
13	(Netherlands) Ivar Moens	(Netherlands) Koopman Racing					Ret	DNS	32	20	20	22							30
14	(Netherlands) Bas Schouten	(Netherlands) JR Motorsport													3	5			30
15	(Belgium) Kenneth Lenthout (Belgium) Mario Martlé	(Belgium) Total Plan Racing Team							12	13									26
16	(Switzerland) Martin Koch	(Austria) MZR Racing											5	5					26
17	(Germany) Peter Posavac	(Netherlands) Koopman Racing	WD	WD							11	Ret					9	11	25
18	(Netherlands) Jaxon Verhoeven (Netherlands) Jean-Pierre Verhoeven	(Belgium) Speedlover													12	13			22
19	(Belgium) Brent Verheyen (Belgium) Cédric Wauters	(Belgium) Total Plan Racing Team							8	DNS									17
20	(Austria) Bob Bau	(Austria) MZR Racing											24	9					10
-	(Netherlands) Jules Grouwels	(Netherlands) Team RaceArt															WD	WD	0
Supersport 1
1	(Netherlands) Dennis de Borst	(Netherlands) FEBO Racing Team	**6**	8	**20**	13	12	11	21	19	13	11	**12**	10	**7**	8	14	13	343
2	(Netherlands) Remco de Beus	(Netherlands) MWR Racing	8	15	17	21			28	24	**22**	12	33	22	17	22			236
2	(Netherlands) Remco de Beus	(Netherlands) JR Motorsport															13	15	236
3	(Netherlands) Oscar Gräper	(Netherlands) FEBO Racing Team	**6**	8	**20**	13	12	11	21	19	13	11							133
4	(Netherlands) Stan van Oord	(Netherlands) FEBO Racing Team											**12**	10	**7**	8	14	13	129
5	(Belgium) Jonas de Kimpe (Netherlands) Priscilla Speelman	(Netherlands) DK-Racing by Ferry Monster Autosport							**27**	25	19	15	14	12					100
6	(Netherlands) Henk Tappel	(Netherlands) Racing Team Tappel	13	24			Ret	15			25	Ret	11	Ret			31	Ret	93
6	(Netherlands) Harold Wisselink	(Netherlands) Racing Team Tappel	13	24			Ret	15					11	Ret			31	Ret	93
7	(Netherlands) Paul Meijer	(Netherlands) Certainty Racing Team											10	11	8	31			77
8	(Netherlands) Melvin van Dam	(Netherlands) MV Motorsport	12	13									9	13					73
9	(Netherlands) Bas Schouten	(Netherlands) MWR Racing									**22**	12							71
9	(Netherlands) Bas Schouten	(Netherlands) JR Motorsport															**24**	14	71
9	(Netherlands) Niek Schouten	(Netherlands) JR Motorsport															**24**	14	71
10	(Senegal) Nagy Kabaz	(Senegal) Domec Racing					**13**	18							9	DNS			52
11	(Netherlands) Ted van Vliet	(Netherlands) JR Motorsport			15	12													46
12	(Netherlands) Tony Vijfschaft	(Netherlands) Ferry Monster Autosport									12	10							46
13	(Netherlands) Dillon Koster	(Netherlands) Certainty Racing Team											10	11					40
14	(Belgium) Michaël De Keersmaecker	(Netherlands) Bas Koeten Racing					11	30											38
15	(Netherlands) Tim Schulte	(Netherlands) Certainty Racing Team													8	31			37
16	(Netherlands) Eddie van Dam	(Netherlands) MV Motorsport	12	13									DNS	DNS					35
17	(Germany) Marco Petry (Germany) Jan von Kiedrowski	(Germany) Pricon Racing											16	17					24
18	(Netherlands) Benjamin van den Berg (Netherlands) Robert van den Berg	(Netherlands) HBR Motorsport	7	Ret															20
19	(Netherlands) Ruud Olij	(Netherlands) Euro Autosport Foundation	14	Ret															11
Supersport 2
1	(Netherlands) Laurens de Wit	(Netherlands) Technova College Racing	**9**	9			**14**	14	**24**	22	16	13	**21**	14	**10**	10	18	17	297
2	(Belgium) Tim de Borle	(Belgium) Xwift Racing Events	15	Ret	**14**	14	21	13	43	26	**14**	17	17	20	15	12	**20**	21	249
3	(Netherlands) Maik Broerson	(Netherlands) Koopman Racing	17	16	16	14	20	19	28	27			15	21	13	16	22	19	221
4	(Netherlands) Tony Verhulst	(Netherlands) Verhulst Invest Motorsports	30	23	13	11	18	17	26	Ret			18	19	12	17	21	33	206
5	(Netherlands) Frank Broerson	(Netherlands) Koopman Racing	17	16	18	16	19	Ret	31	29	21	19	19	15	16	48			169
6	(Netherlands) Berry Arendsen (Netherlands) Joop Arendsen	(Netherlands) Koopman Racing					27	28	38	38	18	16	23	16			26	Ret	110
7	(Belgium) John Engelborghs	(Belgium) ProMare Racing	29	25	25	DNS	29	Ret	41	37	34	Ret	30	27	28	32	Ret	27	99
8	(Belgium) Pieter Denis	(Belgium) Xwift Racing Events	15	Ret	**14**	14	21	13	43	26									94
9	(Netherlands) Gilles van Houten	(Netherlands) Koopman Racing							29	28			13	Ret			33	16	81
10	(Netherlands) Teunis van der Grift	(Netherlands) Ferry Monster Autosport	10	10													17	20	78
11	(Netherlands) Jaydon Post	(Netherlands) Ferry Monster Autosport							23	21									46
12	(Belgium) Esteban Muth	(Belgium) Xwift Racing Events									**14**	17							41
13	(Netherlands) Ferry Monster	(Netherlands) Ferry Monster Autosport	10	10															40
14	(Netherlands) Hassan Arreffag (Netherlands) Mounir Arreffag	(Netherlands) JW Race Service					Ret	24			23	21							35
15	(Netherlands) Andre Seinen (Netherlands) Mark Seinen	(Netherlands) DayVTec													11	24			33
16	(Netherlands) Patrick de Vreede (Netherlands) Rogier de Leeuw	(Belgium) JJ Motorsport									17	18							32
17	(United Kingdom) Robin Greenhalgh (United Kingdom) Jerome Greenhalgh	(Netherlands) Johan Kraan Motorsport	19	18															28
18	(Netherlands) Peter Koelewijn	(Netherlands) DRDO by Koopman Racing													19	27			16
19	(Netherlands) Jan Willem van Stee	(Netherlands) DayVTec													14	33			14
20	(Netherlands) Han Kirchhoff	(Netherlands) DRDO by Koopman Racing													18	30			12
21	(Netherlands) Wessel Sandkuijl	(Netherlands) DRDO by Koopman Racing													20	29			10
22	(Netherlands) Dennis van der Linden	(Netherlands) Certainty Racing Team													22	28			9
23	(Spain) Jacobo Garcia (Netherlands) Ton Janus	(Netherlands) DRDO													21	44			1
24	(Netherlands) Ronald Freiderich	(Netherlands) DRDO by RofChade Racing													23	38			0
25	(Netherlands) Emile Drummen	(Netherlands) DRDO by Koopman Racing													32	43			0
26	(Netherlands) Han Wannet	(Netherlands) DRDO by Koopman Racing													26	39			0
Sport
1	(Netherlands) Mark Jobst	(Netherlands) Zilhouette Racing	22	17	26	Ret	23	22	37	Ret	26	Ret	20	24	**24**	35	**29**	31	240
2	(Belgium) Bart van den Broeck (Belgium) Chris Voet	(Belgium) Traxx Racing Team	21	22	23	Ret	Ret	20	40	36	31	26	31	30	29	34	28	28	201
3	(Netherlands) Bas Barenbrug	(Netherlands) Bas Koeten Racing	27	21	21	19	Ret	Ret	36	31	30	Ret	25	Ret	27	36	Ret	30	180
4	(Netherlands) Bernard Blaak	(Netherlands) Zilhouette Racing	31	Ret	19	Ret			33	33	28	20	27	26			Ret	23	167
5	(Netherlands) Axel Jansen	(Netherlands) Koopman Racing					**25**	21	**34**	35	29	24					27	25	140
6	(Netherlands) Pieter de Jong	(Netherlands) Zilhouette Racing			**22**	18	26	Ret			**Ret**	23	**22**	29			23	32	134
7	(Netherlands) Mark Wieringa	(Netherlands) Zilhouette Racing	**18**	19	Ret	17			35	32	DNS	27					Ret	Ret	115
8	(Netherlands) Jack Hoekstra	(Netherlands) Zilhouette Racing			**22**	18	26	Ret					**22**	29			23	32	114
9	(Netherlands) Jos Harper	(Netherlands) Koopman Racing					30	27					28	25	25	40	32	28	101
10	(Netherlands) Jan Berry Drenth	(Netherlands) Zilhouette Racing			Ret	Ret	24	Ret					Ret	23			25	24	83
11	(Netherlands) Marcel van der Lyke	(Netherlands) Zilhouette Racing	Ret	DNS			Ret	25	39	39	32	23					30	DNS	75
12	(Netherlands) Mex Jansen	(Netherlands) Koopman Racing					**25**	21	**34**	35									74
13	(Netherlands) Mick Schutte	(Netherlands) Koopman Racing					28	23	Ret	Ret	35	29	26	DNS					55
14	(Netherlands) David Emaar (Netherlands) Oscar Vianen	(Netherlands) Zilhouette Racing											29	28			Ret	26	37
15	(Netherlands) Lars Blaak	(Netherlands) Zilhouette Racing	31	Ret													Ret	23	36
16	(Netherlands) John den Hollander	(Netherlands) AKG Motorsport									27	25							35
17	(Netherlands) Jaxon Verhoeven (Netherlands) Jean-Pierre Verhoeven	(Netherlands) DRDO													30	37			28
18	(Netherlands) Jacob Kuil	(Netherlands) Zilhouette Racing			24	20													28
19	(Netherlands) Theo Visser	(Netherlands) DRDO													31	46			22
20	(Belgium) Tom Werckx	(Belgium) JJ Motorsport					31	23											20
21	(Netherlands) Steff de Borst (Netherlands) Lorenzo van Riet	(Netherlands) FEBO Racing Team									33	28							16
22	(Netherlands) Walter Zijlstra	(Netherlands) Zilhouette Racing															Ret	26	15
23	(Italy) Mauro Mercuri (Belgium) Bjorn Vinen	(Italy) Scuderia Tactile					32	29											14
Pos.	Driver	Team	(Netherlands) ZAN		(Germany) HOC		(Belgium) ZOL		(Belgium) SPA		(Netherlands) ASS		(Netherlands) ZAN		(Belgium) SPA		(Netherlands) ASS		Points

Key
Colour	Result
Gold	Winner
Silver	Second place
Bronze	Third place
Green	Other points position
Blue	Other classified position
Blue	Not classified, finished (NC)
Purple	Not classified, retired (Ret)
Red	Did not qualify (DNQ)
Red	Did not pre-qualify (DNPQ)
Black	Disqualified (DSQ)
White	Did not start (DNS)
White	Race cancelled (C)
Blank	Did not practice (DNP)
Blank	Excluded (EX)
Blank	Did not arrive (DNA)
Blank	Withdrawn (WD)
Blank	Did not enter (cell empty)
Text formatting	Meaning
**Bold**	Pole position
Italics	Fastest lap
