= Mex Jansen =

Dutch racing driver (born 2006)

- Jansen at Spa-Francorchamps in 2026
- Nationality: (Netherlands) Dutch
- Born: 10 May 2006 (age 20) Zevenaar, Netherlands
- Categorisation: FIA Silver

Championship titles
- 2025 2024: GT World Challenge Europe Endurance Cup – Silver; Super Car Challenge – GT

Mex Jansen (born 10 May 2006 in Zevenaar) is a Dutch racing driver.

== Career ==
Jansen participated in swimming competitions at an early age, winning silver medals in the 100-meter Butterfly and the 200-meter Medley along with a bronze medal in the 100-meter Breaststroke at the 2019 Gelderland Long Course Championships.

Two years later, Jansen obtained his racing licence and half a year later, made his car racing debut in the 2022 Supercar Challenge for Koopman Racing. After four races in the Sport class, Jansen stepped up to the GT class, winning on debut at Assen. In the last three rounds of the season, Jansen won both races at Zandvoort and ended the season with another win at Assen to finish sixth in the GT points.

Returning to the GT class of Supercar Challenge for 2023, Jansen won seven races on his way to runner-up in points to Max Tubben and Max Weering. Alongside his commitments in the Supercar Challenge series, Jansen joined Walkenhorst Motorsport for his maiden season in ADAC GT4 Germany. Jansen started the season with two third place-finishes in the season-opening round at Oschersleben. After scoring podiums at Zandvoort, Lausitzring, and Sachsenring, Jansen finished the season fifth in the standings on 116 points. At the end of the year, Jansen joined the AMR academy ahead of his step up to GT World Challenge Europe.

Stepping up from ADAC GT4 Germany, Jansen remained with Walkenhorst Motorsport to compete in the GT World Challenge Europe Endurance Cup alongside Tim Creswick and Ben Green in the Bronze Cup. The Dutch driver scored points at the six and 12 hour mark of the 24 Hours of Spa but wouldn't make it to the end as he crashed at the 14th hour at Eau Rouge. He finished the season 32nd in the Bronze Cup standings, on nine points.

In 2025, Jansen joined Paradine Competition and Century Motorsport to compete in the GT World Challenge Europe Sprint Cup and the GT World Challenge Europe Endurance Cup, respectively. In the former, Jansen scored four Silver Cup podiums to end the season fourth in points, whereas in the latter, Jansen scored a class win at Monza and scored two more podiums to secure the Silver Cup title.

The following year, Jansen joined GR Racing to make his European Le Mans Series debut in LMGT3. In his rookie season in ELMS, Jansen took his maiden podium at Le Castellet, before winning at Spa en route to seventh in points. During 2026, Jansen also raced at the 24 Hours of Spa for Porsche-fielding Ziggo Sport – Tempesta Racing after winning the team's shootout for the fourth driver role in June.

== Personal life ==
Jansen is the son of Axel Jansen, a multiple Dutch karting champion, with whom he raced in the Sport class of the 2022 Supercar Challenge. He is managed by two-time 24 Hours of Le Mans class winner Nicky Catsburg.

== Racing record ==
=== Racing career summary ===
Season	Series	Team	Races	Wins	Poles	F/Laps	Podiums	Points	Position
2022	Supercar Challenge - Sport	Koopman Racing	4	0	2	3	3	74	12th
2022	Supercar Challenge - GT	Koopman Racing	8	4	1	2	5	152	6th
2023	Supercar Challenge - GT	Koopman Racing	16	7	3	8	10	269	**2nd**
2023	ADAC GT4 Germany	Walkenhorst Motorsport	12	0	0	0	5	116	5th
2024	Nürburgring Langstrecken-Serie - VT2-FWD	Walkenhorst Racing	1	0	0	0	0	0	NC
2024	Nürburgring Langstrecken-Serie - VT2-R+4WD	Walkenhorst Racing	1	0	0	0	0	0	NC
2024	GT World Challenge Europe Endurance Cup	Walkenhorst Racing	4	0	0	0	0	0	NC
2024	GT World Challenge Europe Endurance Cup - Bronze	Walkenhorst Racing	4	0	0	0	0	9	32nd
2024	Supercar Challenge - GT	Koopman Racing	10	7	2	?	10	200	**1st**
2024	Supercar Challenge - Supersport	Koopman Racing	2	2	1	?	2	46	13th
2025	Middle East Trophy - GT3	Comtoyou Racing	1	0	0	0	0	0	NC
2025	GT World Challenge Europe Endurance Cup	Century Motorsport	5	0	0	0	0	6	23rd
2025	GT World Challenge Europe Endurance Cup - Silver	Century Motorsport	5	1	0	1	3	90	**1st**
2025	GT World Challenge Europe Sprint Cup	Paradine Competition	10	0	0	0	0	6	21st
2025	GT World Challenge Europe Sprint Cup - Silver	Paradine Competition	10	0	0	1	4	76	4th
2025	Supercar Challenge - GT	Koopman Racing	2	2	1	?	2	49	10th
2026	European Le Mans Series – LMGT3	GR Racing	6	1	0	0	2	52	7th
2026	Nürburgring Langstrecken-Serie – SP9 Pro-Am	Walkenhorst Motorsport	0	0	0	0	0	0	NC
2026	24 Hours of Nürburgring – SP9 Pro-Am	Walkenhorst Motorsport	1	0	0	0	0	—N/a	DNF
2026	GT World Challenge Europe Endurance Cup	Ziggo Sport – Tempesta Racing	1	0	0	0	0	0	NC
2026	GT World Challenge Europe Endurance Cup – Bronze	Ziggo Sport – Tempesta Racing	1	0	0	0	0	7	33rd
2026	Intercontinental GT Challenge	Ziggo Sport – Tempesta Racing	1	0	0	0	0	0	NC
2026	Supercar Challenge – GT	Koopman Racing	2	2	2	0	2	0	NC†
2026	24 Hours of Zolder – GTS	Koopman Racing	1	0	0	0	1	—N/a	**3rd**

=== Complete ADAC GT4 Germany results ===
(key) (Races in bold indicate pole position) (Races in italics indicate fastest lap)

Year	Team	Car	1	2	3	4	5	6	7	8	9	10	11	12	DC	Points
2023	Walkenhorst Motorsport	BMW M4 GT4	OSC; 1; 3	OSC; 2; 3	ZAN; 1; 5	ZAN; 2; 2	NÜR; 1; 21	NÜR; 2 Ret	LAU; 1; 3	LAU; 2 Ret	SAC; 1; 25	SAC; 2; 2	HOC; 1; 7	HOC; 2; 9	5th	116

=== Complete GT World Challenge Europe results ===
==== GT World Challenge Europe Endurance Cup ====
(key) (Races in bold indicate pole position) (Races in italics indicate fastest lap)

Year	Team	Car	Class	1	2	3	4	5	6	7	Pos.	Points
2024	Walkenhorst Racing	Aston Martin Vantage AMR GT3 Evo	Bronze	LEC; 36	SPA; 6H; 23	SPA; 12H; 31	SPA; 24H; Ret	NÜR; 42	MNZ; Ret	JED; WD	32nd	9
2025	Century Motorsport	BMW M4 GT3 Evo	Silver	LEC; 24	MNZ; 7	SPA; 6H; 30	SPA; 12H; 20	SPA; 24H; 23	NÜR; 19	BAR; 23	1st	90
2026	Ziggo Sport – Tempesta Racing	Porsche 911 GT3 R (992.2)	Bronze	LEC	MNZ	SPA; 6H; 20	SPA; 12H; 57†	SPA; 24H; Ret	NÜR	ALG	33rd	7

==== GT World Challenge Europe Sprint Cup ====
Year	Team	Car	Class	1	2	3	4	5	6	7	8	9	10	Pos.	Points
2025	Paradine Competition	BMW M4 GT3 Evo	Silver	BRH; 1; 12	BRH; 2; 17	ZAN; 1; 22	ZAN; 2; 7	MIS; 1; 24	MIS; 2; 18	MAG; 1; 17	MAG; 2; 19	VAL; 1; 13	VAL; 2; 7	4th	76

=== Complete European Le Mans Series results ===
(key) (Races in bold indicate pole position) (Races in italics indicate fastest lap)

Year	Entrant	Class	Chassis	Engine	1	2	3	4	5	6	Rank	Points
2026	GR Racing	LMGT3	Ferrari 296 GT3 Evo	Ferrari F163CE 3.0 L Turbo V6	CAT; Ret	LEC; 3	IMO; 7	SPA; 1	SIL; 8	ALG; 9	7th	52
