= Ferry Monster Autosport =

Dutch auto racing team

(Netherlands) Ferry Monster Autosport
- Founded: 2011
- Team principal(s): Ferry Monster
- Current series: Supercar Challenge
- Former series: TCR International Series
- Noted drivers: TCR; 49. (Belgium) Pierre-Yves Corthals; 50. (Netherlands) Loris Hezemans; DSC; 420. (Netherlands) Dennis de Borst; 420. (Netherlands) Martin de Kleijn
- Website: www.ferrymonsterautosport.nl

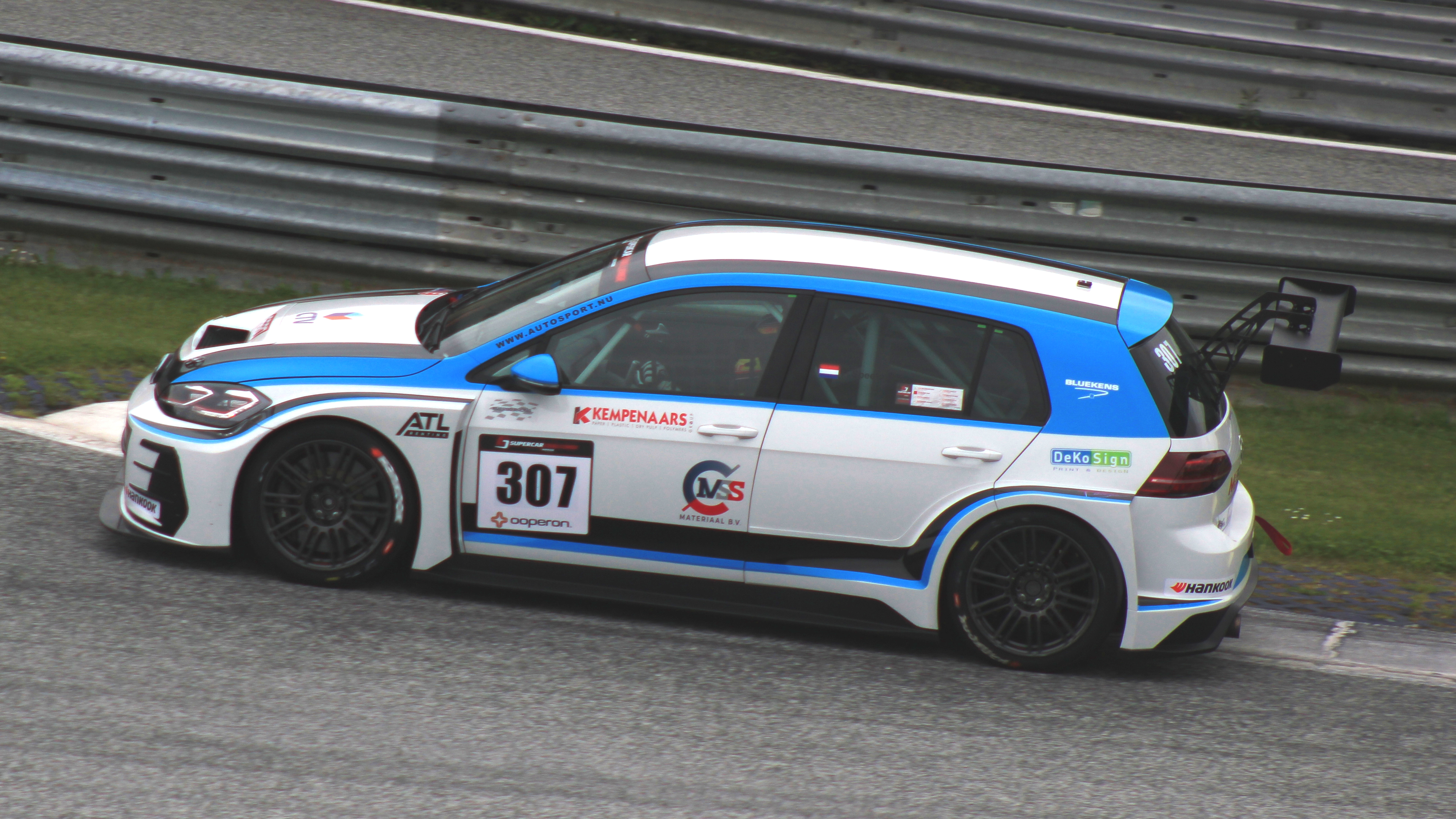
Volkswagen Golf GTI TCR of Ferry Monster Autosport

Ferry Monster Autosport is a Dutch auto racing team based in Numansdorp, Netherlands. The team has raced in the TCR International Series, since 2016. Having previously raced in the Dutch Supercar Challenge and the Legend SuperCup amongst others.

== Dutch Supercar Challenge ==
Having raced in the 2014 Legend SuperCup, the team switched to the 2015 Dutch Supercar Challenge entering a SEAT León Cup Racer for Dutch drivers Dennis Houweling & Priscilla Speelman. Houweling finished 5th in the Supersport/Sport standings after doing a full season, while Speelman finished 13th after only a partial season.

For 2016 the team entered Dutch drivers Dennis de Borst & Martin de Kleijn for the season, still using a SEAT León Cup Racer.

== TCR International Series ==
=== SEAT León Cup Racer and TCR ===
After having raced in the Dutch Supercar Challenge in 2015, the team entered the 2016 TCR International Series with Pierre-Yves Corthals driving a 2015-spec SEAT León Cup Racer and Loris Hezemans driving a newer 2016-spec SEAT León TCR.
