= 1998 British GT Championship =

Sports car racing season

Seasons
- ← 1997 1999 →

The 1998 Privilege Insurance GT Championship was the sixth season of the British GT Championship, an auto racing series organized by the British Racing Drivers Club (BRDC) and sponsored by Privilege Insurance. The races featured grand touring cars conforming to two categories of regulations known as GT1 and GT2, and awarded an overall driver championship from the combined categories. The season began on 5 April 1998 and ended on 4 October 1998 after nine events, one of which was held outside Great Britain for the first time in the championship's history.

Kurt Luby and Richard Dean won the overall championship for Oftedahl Motorsport ahead of the GT1 class-leading pair of Steve O'Rourke and Tim Sugden of O'Rourke's own EMKA Racing team.

== Calendar ==
All races were 50 minutes in duration.

Rnd	Circuit	Date
1	Silverstone International Circuit, Northamptonshire	5 April
2	Oulton Park, Cheshire	4 May
3	Croft Circuit, North Yorkshire	24 May
4	Snetterton Circuit, Norfolk	31 May
5	Silverstone Grand Prix Circuit, Northamptonshire	12 July
6	Donington Park National Circuit, Leicestershire	2 August
7	Silverstone International Circuit, Northamptonshire	23 August
8	Circuit de Spa-Francorchamps, Stavelot, Belgium	27 September
9	Silverstone International Circuit, Northamptonshire	4 October

== Entries ==
=== GT1 ===
Entrant	Car	Engine	Tyre	No.	Drivers	Rounds
(United Kingdom) Blue Coral/Slick 50 Racing	Porsche 911 GT1	Porsche 3.2 L Turbo Flat-6	D	0	(Sweden) Magnus Wallinder	All
(United Kingdom) Blue Coral/Slick 50 Racing	Porsche 911 GT1	Porsche 3.2 L Turbo Flat-6	D	0	(United Kingdom) John Greasley	1–8
(United Kingdom) Blue Coral/Slick 50 Racing	Porsche 911 GT1	Porsche 3.2 L Turbo Flat-6	D	0	(Germany) Wolfgang Kaufmann	9
(United Kingdom) EMKA Racing	McLaren F1 GTR	BMW S70/2 6.0 L V12	P	1	(United Kingdom) Steve O'Rourke	All
(United Kingdom) EMKA Racing	McLaren F1 GTR	BMW S70/2 6.0 L V12	P	1	(United Kingdom) Tim Sugden	All
(United Kingdom) Harrier Cars Racing with Evesham Micros	Harrier GT1-98	Ford Cosworth 2.0 L Turbo I4	D	2	(United Kingdom) Jamie Campbell-Walter	All
(United Kingdom) Harrier Cars Racing with Evesham Micros	Harrier GT1-98	Ford Cosworth 2.0 L Turbo I4	D	2	(United Kingdom) David Goode	1–3
(United Kingdom) Harrier Cars Racing with Evesham Micros	Harrier GT1-98	Ford Cosworth 2.0 L Turbo I4	D	2	(United Kingdom) Nigel Greensall	4
(United Kingdom) Harrier Cars Racing with Evesham Micros	Harrier GT1-98	Ford Cosworth 2.0 L Turbo I4	D	2	(United Kingdom) Alex Portman	5–9
(United Kingdom) Team V12 Harrier Racing	Harrier GT1-98	Ford Cosworth 2.0 L Turbo I4	D	5	(United Kingdom) Valentine Lindsay	1–2, 5
(United Kingdom) Team V12 Harrier Racing	Harrier GT1-98	Ford Cosworth 2.0 L Turbo I4	D	5	(United Kingdom) John Burton	1–2
(United Kingdom) Team V12 Harrier Racing	Harrier GT1-98	Ford Cosworth 2.0 L Turbo I4	D	5	(United Kingdom) Chris Ward	5–7
(United Kingdom) Team V12 Harrier Racing	Harrier GT1-98	Ford Cosworth 2.0 L Turbo I4	D	5	(United Kingdom) Phillip Walker	8
(United Kingdom) Team Carl Racing	McLaren F1 GTR	BMW S70/2 6.0 L V12	P	3	(United Kingdom) Gregor Fisken	5
(United Kingdom) Team Carl Racing	McLaren F1 GTR	BMW S70/2 6.0 L V12	P	3	(United Kingdom) Peter Hardman	5
(United Kingdom) Quaife Developments	Quaife R4 GTS	Ford 6.0 L V8	D	4	(United Kingdom) Mike Quaife	1–2, 4–9
(United Kingdom) Quaife Developments	Quaife R4 GTS	Ford 6.0 L V8	D	4	(United Kingdom) Paul Lee	1–2, 4
(United Kingdom) Quaife Developments	Quaife R4 GTS	Ford 6.0 L V8	D	4	(United Kingdom) Graham Hathaway	5–9
(United Kingdom) RGS Motorsport	Mirage GT1	Chevrolet 6.0 L V8		6	(United Kingdom) Gary Ward	1, 4, 7, 9
(United Kingdom) Newcastle United Lister Storm	Lister Storm GTL	Jaguar 7.0 L V12	M	7	(United Kingdom) Julian Bailey	All
(United Kingdom) Newcastle United Lister Storm	Lister Storm GTL	Jaguar 7.0 L V12	M	7	(United Kingdom) Tiff Needell	2, 4–7, 9
(United Kingdom) Newcastle United Lister Storm	Lister Storm GTL	Jaguar 7.0 L V12	M	7	(United Kingdom) Anthony Reid	8
(United Kingdom) Lister Storm	Lister Storm GTL	Jaguar 7.0 L V12	M	8	(United Kingdom) Ian Flux	1–2, 4–9
(United Kingdom) Lister Storm	Lister Storm GTL	Jaguar 7.0 L V12	M	8	(United States) Jake Ulrich	1–2, 4–7, 9
(United Kingdom) Lister Storm	Lister Storm GTL	Jaguar 7.0 L V12	M	8	(United Kingdom) Ian McKellar	8
(United Kingdom) RMA Driving Sensations	Porsche 993 GT1	Porsche 3.6 L Turbo Flat-6	D	9	(United Kingdom) Jamie Masarati	1–2, 4–7, 9
(United Kingdom) RMA Driving Sensations	Porsche 993 GT1	Porsche 3.6 L Turbo Flat-6	D	9	(United Kingdom) Gavin Mortimer	1–2, 4–7, 9
(United Kingdom) Team HEM Lister	Lister Storm GTL	Jaguar 7.0 L V12	D	10	(United Kingdom) William Hewland	All
(United Kingdom) Team HEM Lister	Lister Storm GTL	Jaguar 7.0 L V12	D	10	(United Kingdom) Paul Evans	All
(United Kingdom) Millennium Motorsport (United Kingdom) Team NCK (Note: Millennium Motorsport entered Rounds 1–4, while the team was renamed Team NCK from Round 5 onward.)	Porsche 911 GT1	Porsche 3.2 L Turbo Flat-6	G D	11	(Denmark) Thorkild Thyrring	1–3
(United Kingdom) Millennium Motorsport (United Kingdom) Team NCK	Porsche 911 GT1	Porsche 3.2 L Turbo Flat-6	G D	11	(Denmark) John Nielsen	1–3
(United Kingdom) Millennium Motorsport (United Kingdom) Team NCK	Porsche 911 GT1	Porsche 3.2 L Turbo Flat-6	G D	11	(United Kingdom) Matt Neal	5
(United Kingdom) Millennium Motorsport (United Kingdom) Team NCK	Porsche 911 GT1	Porsche 3.2 L Turbo Flat-6	G D	11	(United Kingdom) David Leslie	5
(United Kingdom) TVR Engineering	TVR Cerbera Speed 12	TVR 7.7 L V12	D	12	(United Kingdom) Bobby Verdon-Roe	2, 4–7
(United Kingdom) TVR Engineering	TVR Cerbera Speed 12	TVR 7.7 L V12	D	12	(United Kingdom) John Kent	2, 5–7
(United Kingdom) TVR Engineering	TVR Cerbera Speed 12	TVR 7.7 L V12	D	12	(United Kingdom) Martin Short	4
(United Kingdom) SRS Motorsport	Harrier LR9C	Ford Cosworth 2.0 L I4		15	(United Kingdom) Simon Stebbings	5–7, 9
(United Kingdom) SRS Motorsport	Harrier LR9C	Ford Cosworth 2.0 L I4		15	(United Kingdom) Dave Percival	5–7, 9
(United Kingdom) BVB Motorsport	Porsche 911 GT2 Evo	Porsche 3.6 L Turbo Flat-6	D	16	(United Kingdom) Max Beaverbroock	7–8
(United Kingdom) BVB Motorsport	Porsche 911 GT2 Evo	Porsche 3.6 L Turbo Flat-6	D	16	(United Kingdom) Barrie Williams	7
(United Kingdom) BVB Motorsport	Porsche 911 GT2 Evo	Porsche 3.6 L Turbo Flat-6	D	16	(United Kingdom) John Greasley	8
(United Kingdom) Score Magazine Natty Racing	Harrier LR9C	Ford Cosworth 2.0 L Turbo Flat-6	Y	18	(United Kingdom) Tony Soper	7, 9
(United Kingdom) Score Magazine Natty Racing	Harrier LR9C	Ford Cosworth 2.0 L Turbo Flat-6	Y	18	(United Kingdom) Roberto Giordanelli	7, 9
(United Kingdom) Allen Lloyd	Jaguar XJ220C	Jaguar JV6 3.5 L Turbo V6		20	(United Kingdom) Allen Lloyd	9
(United Kingdom) Rotor Motive	Venturi 600LM	Renault PRV 3.0 L Turbo V6		21	(United Kingdom) Sandy McEwen	2–3, 5, 9
(United Kingdom) Rotor Motive	Venturi 600LM	Renault PRV 3.0 L Turbo V6		21	(United Kingdom) Bryce Wilson	2, 5
(United Kingdom) Rotor Motive	Venturi 600LM	Renault PRV 3.0 L Turbo V6		21	(United Kingdom) Ken Thomson	3, 9

=== GT2 ===
Entrant	Car	Engine	Tyre	No.	Drivers	Rounds
(United Kingdom) Gérard MacQuillan	Porsche 911 GT2	Porsche 3.6 L Turbo Flat-6		32	(United Kingdom) Gérard MacQuillan	5, 7, 9
(United Kingdom) Gérard MacQuillan	Porsche 911 GT2	Porsche 3.6 L Turbo Flat-6		32	(Brazil) Thomas Erdos	5
(United Kingdom) Gérard MacQuillan	Porsche 911 GT2	Porsche 3.6 L Turbo Flat-6		32	(United Kingdom) Allen Lloyd	7
(United Kingdom) Gérard MacQuillan	Porsche 911 GT2	Porsche 3.6 L Turbo Flat-6		32	(United Kingdom) Alec Hammond	9
(United Kingdom) Gaumont/Parr Motorsport	Porsche 911 GT2	Porsche 3.6 L Flat-6	P	33	(United Kingdom) David Saunders	All
(United Kingdom) Gaumont/Parr Motorsport	Porsche 911 GT2	Porsche 3.6 L Flat-6	P	33	(United Kingdom) Jason Saunders	1–7, 9
(United Kingdom) Gaumont/Parr Motorsport	Porsche 911 GT2	Porsche 3.6 L Flat-6	P	33	(United Kingdom) Richard Nearn	8
(United Kingdom) DRP/G-Tech Motorsport	Lotus Esprit	Lotus Type-918 3.5 L Turbo V8	A	34	(United Kingdom) Graham Morris	1–5
(United Kingdom) DRP/G-Tech Motorsport	Lotus Esprit	Lotus Type-918 3.5 L Turbo V8	A	34	(Netherlands) Allard Kalff	1–2
(United Kingdom) DRP/G-Tech Motorsport	Lotus Esprit	Lotus Type-918 3.5 L Turbo V8	A	34	(Netherlands) Jacky van der Ende	3, 9
(United Kingdom) DRP/G-Tech Motorsport	Lotus Esprit	Lotus Type-918 3.5 L Turbo V8	A	34	(United Kingdom) Ian Astley	4–9
(United Kingdom) DRP/G-Tech Motorsport	Lotus Esprit	Lotus Type-918 3.5 L Turbo V8	A	34	(Netherlands) Martijn Koene	6–8
(United Kingdom) G-Force Motorsport	Porsche 911 GT2	Porsche 3.6 L Turbo Flat-6	D	35	(United Kingdom) Calum Lockie	5–9
(United Kingdom) G-Force Motorsport	Porsche 911 GT2	Porsche 3.6 L Turbo Flat-6	D	35	(United Kingdom) Nigel Barrett	5–9
(United Kingdom) Blue Coral/Slick 50 Racing	Porsche 911 GT2	Porsche 3.6 L Turbo Flat-6	D	50	(United Kingdom) Geoff Lister	All
(United Kingdom) Blue Coral/Slick 50 Racing	Porsche 911 GT2	Porsche 3.6 L Turbo Flat-6	D	50	(United Kingdom) John Morrison	1–7, 9
(United Kingdom) Blue Coral/Slick 50 Racing	Porsche 911 GT2	Porsche 3.6 L Turbo Flat-6	D	50	(Sweden) Magnus Wallinder	8
(United Kingdom) Keith McKenzie	Marcos LM600	Chevrolet 6.0 L V8		36	(United Kingdom) Keith McKenzie	2–5
(United Kingdom) Keith McKenzie	Marcos LM600	Chevrolet 6.0 L V8		36	(United Kingdom) Paul Phillips	2
(United Kingdom) Keith McKenzie	Marcos LM600	Chevrolet 6.0 L V8		36	(United Kingdom) Simon Phillips	3
(United Kingdom) Keith McKenzie	Marcos LM600	Chevrolet 6.0 L V8		36	(United Kingdom) Robert Schirle	4
(United Kingdom) Premium Team-Carmichaels Motorsport	Porsche 911 Carrera RSR; Porsche 911 GT2	Porsche 3.8 L Flat-6; Porsche 3.6 L Turbo Flat-6	D	38; 37	(United Kingdom) Calum Lockie	1–3
(United Kingdom) Premium Team-Carmichaels Motorsport	Porsche 911 Carrera RSR; Porsche 911 GT2	Porsche 3.8 L Flat-6; Porsche 3.6 L Turbo Flat-6	D	38; 37	(United Kingdom) Nigel Barrett	1–3
(United Kingdom) CPi Racing	Venturi 400 GT	Renault PRV 3.0 L V6		39	(United Kingdom) Nigel Rata	1, 3, 6
(United Kingdom) PK Sport	Porsche 911 GT2	Porsche 3.6 L Turbo Flat-6	P	40	(United Kingdom) Stephen Day	1–8
(United Kingdom) PK Sport	Porsche 911 GT2	Porsche 3.6 L Turbo Flat-6	P	40	(United Kingdom) Ian Astley	1, 3
(United Kingdom) PK Sport	Porsche 911 GT2	Porsche 3.6 L Turbo Flat-6	P	40	(United Kingdom) Peter Chambers	2
(United Kingdom) PK Sport	Porsche 911 GT2	Porsche 3.6 L Turbo Flat-6	P	40	(United Kingdom) Michael Pickup	4
(United Kingdom) PK Sport	Porsche 911 GT2	Porsche 3.6 L Turbo Flat-6	P	40	(United Kingdom) Stéphen Gugliemi	6
(United Kingdom) PK Sport	Porsche 911 GT2	Porsche 3.6 L Turbo Flat-6	P	40	(United Kingdom) Mike Jordan	7–8
(United Kingdom) PK Sport	Porsche 911 GT2	Porsche 3.6 L Turbo Flat-6	P	42	(United Kingdom) Martyn Konig	3–9
(United Kingdom) PK Sport	Porsche 911 GT2	Porsche 3.6 L Turbo Flat-6	P	42	(United Kingdom) Gregor Fisken	3–4
(United Kingdom) PK Sport	Porsche 911 GT2	Porsche 3.6 L Turbo Flat-6	P	42	(United Kingdom) Paul Phillips	5–9
(United Kingdom) PK Sport	Porsche 911 Carrera RSR	Porsche 3.8 L Flat-6	P	46	(United Kingdom) Caroline Lucas	1–2, 4–9
(United Kingdom) PK Sport	Porsche 911 Carrera RSR	Porsche 3.8 L Flat-6	P	46	(United Kingdom) Diane Osborne	1–2, 4–5, 7–9
(United Kingdom) Ciceley Race Team	Marcos Mantis	Ford 4.6 L V8		41	(United Kingdom) Russell Morgan	1–2, 5–6
(United Kingdom) Ciceley Race Team	Marcos Mantis	Ford 4.6 L V8		41	(United Kingdom) Chris Marsh	1
(United Kingdom) Ciceley Race Team	Marcos Mantis	Ford 4.6 L V8		41	(United Kingdom) Simon Duerden	2
(United Kingdom) Ciceley Race Team	Marcos Mantis	Ford 4.6 L V8		41	(United Kingdom) Simon Jackson	5
(United Kingdom) Chas Berger Motorsport	Ultima Mk4	Ford Cosworth 2.0 L Turbo I4	A	43	(United Kingdom) Robin Rex	1–2, 5–9
(United Kingdom) Chas Berger Motorsport	Ultima Mk4	Ford Cosworth 2.0 L Turbo I4	A	43	(United Kingdom) Mark James	1–5
(United Kingdom) Chas Berger Motorsport	Ultima Mk4	Ford Cosworth 2.0 L Turbo I4	A	43	(United Kingdom) Mark Pashley	5, 8–9
(United Kingdom) Chas Berger Motorsport	Ultima Mk4	Ford Cosworth 2.0 L Turbo I4	A	43	(United Kingdom) Mike Millard	7
(United Kingdom) Forward GT Racing	Marcos LM500	Rover 5.0 L V8	D	44	(United Kingdom) Jeff Wyatt	1–3, 5–7, 9
(United Kingdom) Forward GT Racing	Marcos LM500	Rover 5.0 L V8	D	44	(United Kingdom) Colin Ward	1–2, 4
(United Kingdom) Forward GT Racing	Marcos LM500	Rover 5.0 L V8	D	44	(United Kingdom) Rupert Beckwith-Smith	3–4
(United Kingdom) Orion Motorsport (United Kingdom) Oftedahl Motorsport (Note: Orion Motorsport entered Round 1, while the team was renamed Oftedahl Motorsport from Round 2 onward.)	Chrysler Viper GTS-R	Chrysler 356-T6 8.0 L V10	D	51	(United Kingdom) Kurt Luby	All
(United Kingdom) Orion Motorsport (United Kingdom) Oftedahl Motorsport	Chrysler Viper GTS-R	Chrysler 356-T6 8.0 L V10	D	51	(United Kingdom) Richard Dean	All
(United Kingdom) Orion Motorsport (United Kingdom) Oftedahl Motorsport	Chrysler Viper GTS-R	Chrysler 356-T6 8.0 L V10	D	52	(United Kingdom) Julian Westwood	1
(United Kingdom) Orion Motorsport (United Kingdom) Oftedahl Motorsport	Chrysler Viper GTS-R	Chrysler 356-T6 8.0 L V10	D	52	(Netherlands) Michael Vergers	1
(United Kingdom) Dave Welz Racing	Porsche 930	Porsche 3.6 L Turbo Flat-6		53	(United Kingdom) Dave Welz	4–5, 8
(United Kingdom) Score Magazine Natty Racing	Maserati Ghibli	Maserati 2.0 L Turbo V6	Y	54	(United Kingdom) Tony Soper	3–4
(United Kingdom) Score Magazine Natty Racing	Maserati Ghibli	Maserati 2.0 L Turbo V6	Y	54	(United Kingdom) Roberto Giordanelli	3–4
(United Kingdom) Harrogate Horseless Carriage	TVR Cerbera	TVR 5.0 L V8	D	55	(United Kingdom) Colin Blower	1–6
(United Kingdom) Harrogate Horseless Carriage	TVR Cerbera	TVR 5.0 L V8	D	55	(United Kingdom) Tiff Needell	1
(United Kingdom) Harrogate Horseless Carriage	TVR Cerbera	TVR 5.0 L V8	D	55	(Brazil) Thomas Erdos	2, 4
(United Kingdom) Harrogate Horseless Carriage	TVR Cerbera	TVR 5.0 L V8	D	55	(United Kingdom) Nigel Greensall	3, 5–6
(United Kingdom) Hopkins Motorsport	Ultima Mk4	Chevrolet 6.0 L V8	A	56	(United Kingdom) Philip Hopkins	1, 3–7
(United Kingdom) Hopkins Motorsport	Ultima Mk4	Chevrolet 6.0 L V8	A	56	(United Kingdom) Geoff Kimber-Smith	1, 3–5, 7
(United Kingdom) Hopkins Motorsport	Ultima Mk4	Chevrolet 6.0 L V8	A	56	(United Kingdom) Geoff Janes	6
(United Kingdom) Screwfix Direct	Marcos Mantis	Ford 4.6 L V8		57	(United Kingdom) Richard Hann	9
(United Kingdom) Screwfix Direct	Marcos Mantis	Ford 4.6 L V8		57	(United Kingdom) Steve Hall	9
(United Kingdom) Wellings/Guest	Porsche 911 GT2	Porsche 3.6 L Turbo Flat-6		58	(United Kingdom) Ian Guest	1, 4–7
(United Kingdom) Wellings/Guest	Porsche 911 GT2	Porsche 3.6 L Turbo Flat-6		58	(United Kingdom) Steve Wellings	1, 4–7
(United Kingdom) Riverside Motorsports	Venturi 400 GTR	Renault PRV 3.0 L Turbo V6		60	(United Kingdom) Glenn Dudley	4–6, 9
(United Kingdom) Riverside Motorsports	Venturi 400 GTR	Renault PRV 3.0 L Turbo V6		60	(United Kingdom) Paul Cope	4–6, 9
(Germany) Konrad Motorsport	Porsche 911 GT2	Porsche 3.6 L Turbo Flat-6	D	66	(Austria) Franz Konrad	8
(United Kingdom) Millennium Motorsport (United Kingdom) Team NCK	Marcos LM600	Chevrolet 6.0 L V8	D	77	(United Kingdom) Andy Purvis	All
(United Kingdom) Millennium Motorsport (United Kingdom) Team NCK	Marcos LM600	Chevrolet 6.0 L V8	D	77	(United Kingdom) Bob Sands	1–5
(United Kingdom) Millennium Motorsport (United Kingdom) Team NCK	Marcos LM600	Chevrolet 6.0 L V8	D	77	(Brazil) Thomas Erdos	6–9
(United Kingdom) GP Motorsport	Saleen Mustang	Ford 5.9 L V8		80	(Australia) Charlie Cox	8–9
(United Kingdom) GP Motorsport	Saleen Mustang	Ford 5.9 L V8		80	(United Kingdom) Patrick Watts	8
(United Kingdom) GP Motorsport	Saleen Mustang	Ford 5.9 L V8		80	(United Kingdom) Suzi Hart-Banks	9
(United Kingdom) Swansea Institute Team Darrian	Darrian T90	Ford 2.0 L Turbo I4		90	(United Kingdom) Ken Thomson	7
(United Kingdom) Swansea Institute Team Darrian	Darrian T90	Ford 2.0 L Turbo I4		90	(United Kingdom) Simon Duerdon	7
(United Kingdom) Swansea Institute Team Darrian	Darrian T90	Ford 2.0 L Turbo I4		90	(United Kingdom) Frank Bradley	9
(United Kingdom) Swansea Institute Team Darrian	Darrian T90	Ford 2.0 L Turbo I4		90	(United Kingdom) Del Delaronde	9
(United Kingdom) Brookspeed Racing	Chrysler Viper GTS-R	Chrysler 356-T6 8.0 L V10		96	(New Zealand) Neil Cunningham	5
(United Kingdom) Brookspeed Racing	Chrysler Viper GTS-R	Chrysler 356-T6 8.0 L V10		96	(United Kingdom) Kilian Konig	5
(United Kingdom) Cirtek Motorsport	Saleen Mustang; Porsche 911 GT2	Ford 5.9 L V8; Porsche 3.6 L Turbo Flat-6	D	98	(United Kingdom) David Warnock	1, 3, 5–9
(United Kingdom) Cirtek Motorsport	Saleen Mustang; Porsche 911 GT2	Ford 5.9 L V8; Porsche 3.6 L Turbo Flat-6	D	98	(United Kingdom) Robert Schirle	1, 5–6, 8–8
(United Kingdom) Cirtek Motorsport	Saleen Mustang; Porsche 911 GT2	Ford 5.9 L V8; Porsche 3.6 L Turbo Flat-6	D	98	(Australia) Charlie Cox	3, 7
(United Kingdom) Cirtek Motorsport	Saleen Mustang; Porsche 911 GT2	Ford 5.9 L V8; Porsche 3.6 L Turbo Flat-6	D	99	(Australia) Charlie Cox	5
(United Kingdom) Cirtek Motorsport	Saleen Mustang; Porsche 911 GT2	Ford 5.9 L V8; Porsche 3.6 L Turbo Flat-6	D	99	(United Kingdom) Patrick Watts	5

== Race results ==
Rnd	Circuit	GT1 Winning Team	GT2 Winning Team
Rnd	Circuit	GT1 Winning Drivers	GT2 Winning Drivers
1	Silverstone	(United Kingdom) No. 0 Blue Coral/Slick 50 Racing	(United Kingdom) No. 34 DRP/G-Tech Motorsport
1	Silverstone	(United Kingdom) John Greasley (Sweden) Magnus Wallinder	(Netherlands) Allard Kalff (United Kingdom) Graham Morris
2	Oulton Park	(United Kingdom) No. 1 EMKA Racing	(United Kingdom) No. 51 Oftedahl Motorsport
2	Oulton Park	(United Kingdom) Tim Sugden (United Kingdom) Steve O'Rourke	(United Kingdom) Kurt Luby (United Kingdom) Richard Dean
3	Croft	(United Kingdom) No. 11 Millennium Motorsport	(United Kingdom) No. 51 Oftedahl Motorsport
3	Croft	(Denmark) Thorkild Thyrring (Denmark) John Nielsen	(United Kingdom) Kurt Luby (United Kingdom) Richard Dean
4	Snetterton	(United Kingdom) No. 7 Newcastle United Lister Storm	(United Kingdom) No. 51 Oftedahl Motorsport
4	Snetterton	(United Kingdom) Julian Bailey (United Kingdom) Tiff Needell	(United Kingdom) Kurt Luby (United Kingdom) Richard Dean
5	Silverstone	(United Kingdom) No. 0 Blue Coral/Slick 50 Racing	(United Kingdom) No. 51 Oftedahl Motorsport
5	Silverstone	(United Kingdom) John Greasley (Sweden) Magnus Wallinder	(United Kingdom) Kurt Luby (United Kingdom) Richard Dean
6	Donington	(United Kingdom) No. 0 Blue Coral/Slick 50 Racing	(United Kingdom) No. 51 Oftedahl Motorsport
6	Donington	(United Kingdom) John Greasley (Sweden) Magnus Wallinder	(United Kingdom) Kurt Luby (United Kingdom) Richard Dean
7	Silverstone	(United Kingdom) No. 7 Newcastle United Lister Storm	(United Kingdom) No. 51 Oftedahl Motorsport
7	Silverstone	(United Kingdom) Julian Bailey (United Kingdom) Tiff Needell	(United Kingdom) Kurt Luby (United Kingdom) Richard Dean
8	Spa-Francorchamps	(United Kingdom) No. 1 EMKA Racing	(United Kingdom) No. 77 NCK Racing
8	Spa-Francorchamps	(United Kingdom) Tim Sugden (United Kingdom) Steve O'Rourke	(United Kingdom) Andy Purvis (Brazil) Thomas Erdos
9	Silverstone	(United Kingdom) No. 7 Newcastle United Lister Storm	(United Kingdom) No. 34 DRP/G-Tech Motorsport
9	Silverstone	(United Kingdom) Julian Bailey (United Kingdom) Tiff Needell	(Netherlands) Jacky van der Ende (United Kingdom) Ian Astley
