= 1999 British GT Championship =

Sports car racing season

Seasons
- ← 1998 2000 →

The 1999 Privilege Insurance British GT Championship was the seventh season of the British GT Championship, an auto racing series organised by the British Racing Drivers Club (BRDC) and sponsored by Privilege. The races featured grand touring cars conforming to two categories of regulations known as GT1 and GT2, and awarded a driver championship in each category. This was the final season that the GT1 class competed in the series. The season began on 28 March 1999 and ended on 10 October 1999 after eleven events, all held in Great Britain with one race in Belgium. The series was joined by the BRDC Marcos Mantis Challenge Cup for several events.

Jamie Campbell-Walter and Julian Bailey won the GT1 championship for Lister Storm Racing, while David Warnock won the GT2 category for Cirtek Motorsport.

== Calendar ==
All races were 50 minutes in duration.

Rnd	Circuit	Date
1	Silverstone International Circuit, Northamptonshire	28 March
2	Oulton Park, Cheshire	3 May
3	Snetterton Circuit, Norfolk	31 May
4	Brands Hatch, Kent	20 June
5	Silverstone Grand Prix Circuit, Northamptonshire	11 July
6	Donington Park National Circuit, Leicestershire	7 August
7	Donington Park National Circuit, Leicestershire	8 August
8	Silverstone International Circuit, Northamptonshire	22 August
9	Croft Circuit, North Yorkshire	5 September
10	Circuit de Spa-Francorchamps, Stavelot, Belgium	26 September
11	Silverstone International Circuit, Northamptonshire	10 October

== Entries ==
=== GT1 ===
Entrant	Car	Engine	Tyre	No.	Drivers	Rounds
(United Kingdom) Sintura Racing with Evesham Micros	Sintura S99	Judd GV4 4.0 L V10	D	0	(United Kingdom) Richard Dean	4–10
(United Kingdom) Sintura Racing with Evesham Micros	Sintura S99	Judd GV4 4.0 L V10	D	0	(United Kingdom) Kurt Luby	4–10
(United Kingdom) EMKA Racing Ltd.	McLaren F1 GTR	BMW S70/2 6.0 L V12	P	1	(United Kingdom) Tim Sugden	All
(United Kingdom) EMKA Racing Ltd.	McLaren F1 GTR	BMW S70/2 6.0 L V12	P	1	(United Kingdom) Steve O'Rourke	1–2, 4–11
(United Kingdom) AM Racing	McLaren F1 GTR	BMW S70/2 6.0 L V12	D	2	(United Kingdom) Chris Goodwin	1–5
(United Kingdom) AM Racing	McLaren F1 GTR	BMW S70/2 6.0 L V12	D	2	(United Kingdom) James Munroe	1, 3–5
(United Kingdom) Quaife Engineering	Quaife R4 GTS	Ford 6.0 L V8	D	4	(United Kingdom) Mike Quaife	6–8, 10–11
(United Kingdom) Quaife Engineering	Quaife R4 GTS	Ford 6.0 L V8	D	4	(United Kingdom) Simon Duerden	6–8, 10–11
(United Kingdom) Blue Coral Slick 50 Racing	Porsche 911 GT1	Porsche 3.2 L Turbo Flat-6	D	5	(Sweden) Magnus Wallinder	All
(United Kingdom) Blue Coral Slick 50 Racing	Porsche 911 GT1	Porsche 3.2 L Turbo Flat-6	D	5	(United Kingdom) Geoff Lister	All
(United Kingdom) G-Force Motorsport Ltd.	Porsche 911 GT1	Porsche 3.2 L Turbo Flat-6	D	6	(United Kingdom) John Greasley	1–2, 4–7
(United Kingdom) G-Force Motorsport Ltd.	Porsche 911 GT1	Porsche 3.2 L Turbo Flat-6	D	6	(Denmark) Thorkild Thyrring	1–2
(United Kingdom) G-Force Motorsport Ltd.	Porsche 911 GT1	Porsche 3.2 L Turbo Flat-6	D	6	(United Kingdom) John Morrison	4–7, 10–11
(United Kingdom) G-Force Motorsport Ltd.	Porsche 911 GT1	Porsche 3.2 L Turbo Flat-6	D	6	(United Kingdom) Nigel Barrett	10
(United Kingdom) G-Force Motorsport Ltd.	Porsche 911 GT1	Porsche 3.2 L Turbo Flat-6	D	6	(United Kingdom) Sean Walker	11
(United Kingdom) Gaumont/Parr Motorsport	Porsche 911 GT1 Evo	Porsche 3.2 L Turbo Flat-6	P	7	(United Kingdom) David Saunders	1
(United Kingdom) Gaumont/Parr Motorsport	Porsche 911 GT1 Evo	Porsche 3.2 L Turbo Flat-6	P	7	(Monaco) Stéphane Ortelli	1
(United Kingdom) RMA Driving Sensations	Porsche 993 GT1	Porsche 3.6 L Turbo Flat-6	D	9	(United Kingdom) Jamie Masarati	5–7, 11
(United Kingdom) RMA Driving Sensations	Porsche 993 GT1	Porsche 3.6 L Turbo Flat-6	D	9	(United Kingdom) Gavin Mortimer	5–7, 11
(United Kingdom) Newcastle United Lister Storm	Lister Storm GTL	Jaguar 7.0 L V12	M	14	(United Kingdom) Jamie Campbell-Walter	All
(United Kingdom) Newcastle United Lister Storm	Lister Storm GTL	Jaguar 7.0 L V12	M	14	(United Kingdom) Julian Bailey	All
(Germany) Klaus Abbelen	Porsche 911 GT2 Evo	Porsche 3.6 L Turbo Flat-6	K	16	(Germany) Klaus Abbelen	10

=== GT2 ===
Entrant	Car	Engine	Tyre	No.	Drivers	Rounds
(United Kingdom) Cirtek Motorsport	Porsche 911 GT2; Lister Storm GT2 (Note: Cirtek Motorsport entered the first two races and final race with a Porsche 911 GT2 for their No. 32 entry. From rounds 3–8 the team used a Lister Storm GT2.)	Porsche 3.6 L Turbo Flat-6; Jaguar 7.0 L V12	M	32	(United Kingdom) David Warnock	1–8, 11
(United Kingdom) Cirtek Motorsport	Porsche 911 GT2; Lister Storm GT2	Porsche 3.6 L Turbo Flat-6; Jaguar 7.0 L V12	M	32	(Germany) Claudia Hürtgen	1
(United Kingdom) Cirtek Motorsport	Porsche 911 GT2; Lister Storm GT2	Porsche 3.6 L Turbo Flat-6; Jaguar 7.0 L V12	M	32	(United Kingdom) Robert Schirle	2–8, 11
(United Kingdom) Cirtek Motorsport	Porsche 911 GT2	Porsche 3.6 L Turbo Flat-6	D	34	(Australia) Charlie Cox	5–8, 10
(United Kingdom) Cirtek Motorsport	Porsche 911 GT2	Porsche 3.6 L Turbo Flat-6	D	34	(United Kingdom) Jonathan Baker	5–8, 10
(United Kingdom) Gaumont/Parr Motorsport	Porsche 911 GT2	Porsche 3.6 L Turbo Flat-6	P	33	(United Kingdom) Jason Saunders	1
(United Kingdom) Gaumont/Parr Motorsport	Porsche 911 GT2	Porsche 3.6 L Turbo Flat-6	P	33	(United Kingdom) Stephen Day	1
(United Kingdom) HKM/Parr Motorsport	Chrysler Viper GTS-R	Chrysler 356-T6 8.0 L V10	D	70	(New Zealand) Neil Cunningham	4–7, 9–10
(United Kingdom) HKM/Parr Motorsport	Chrysler Viper GTS-R	Chrysler 356-T6 8.0 L V10	D	70	(United Kingdom) Kilian Konig	4–5, 9
(United Kingdom) HKM/Parr Motorsport	Chrysler Viper GTS-R	Chrysler 356-T6 8.0 L V10	D	70	(United Kingdom) Curtis Hayles	6–7
(United Kingdom) HKM/Parr Motorsport	Chrysler Viper GTS-R	Chrysler 356-T6 8.0 L V10	D	70	(Denmark) John Nielsen	10
(United Kingdom) Lister Storm Racing	Lister Storm GT2	Jaguar 7.0 L V12	M	35	(Denmark) Thorkild Thyrring	11
(United Kingdom) Lister Storm Racing	Lister Storm GT2	Jaguar 7.0 L V12	M	35	(United Kingdom) William Hewland	11
(United Kingdom) Lister Storm Racing	Lister Storm GT2	Jaguar 7.0 L V12	M	41	(Denmark) Thorkild Thyrring	4–5
(United Kingdom) Lister Storm Racing	Lister Storm GT2	Jaguar 7.0 L V12	M	41	(United Kingdom) William Hewland	4–5
(United Kingdom) Lister Storm Racing	Lister Storm GT2	Jaguar 7.0 L V12	M	41	(United Kingdom) Peter Hardman	10–11
(United Kingdom) Lister Storm Racing	Lister Storm GT2	Jaguar 7.0 L V12	M	41	(Germany) Nicolaus Springer	10–11
(United Kingdom) BVB Motorsport	Porsche 911 GT2	Porsche 3.6 L Turbo Flat-6	D	36	(United Kingdom) Martin Stretton	6
(United Kingdom) BVB Motorsport	Porsche 911 GT2	Porsche 3.6 L Turbo Flat-6	D	36	(United Kingdom) Max Beaverbroock	6
(United Kingdom) Mike Haines Racing with Triplex Components	Venturi 400LM	Renault PRV 3.0 L Turbo V6	D	38	(United Kingdom) Chris Ellis	1, 3–5, 8, 11
(United Kingdom) Mike Haines Racing with Triplex Components	Venturi 400LM	Renault PRV 3.0 L Turbo V6	D	38	(Netherlands) Michael Vergers	1, 3–5, 8
(United Kingdom) Mike Haines Racing with Triplex Components	Venturi 400LM	Renault PRV 3.0 L Turbo V6	D	38	(United Kingdom) Marco Attard	11
(United Kingdom) GW Racing	Marcos LM500	Rover 5.0 L V8		39	(United Kingdom) Jeff Wyatt	5, 11
(United Kingdom) GW Racing	Marcos LM500	Rover 5.0 L V8		39	(United Kingdom) Gerry Webb	5
(United Kingdom) GW Racing	Marcos LM500	Rover 5.0 L V8		39	(United Kingdom) Mark Newman	11
(United Kingdom) Point Preparations	Porsche 911 GT2	Porsche 3.6 L Turbo Flat-6	D	40	(United Kingdom) Peter Cook	1–5
(United Kingdom) Point Preparations	Porsche 911 GT2	Porsche 3.6 L Turbo Flat-6	D	40	(United Kingdom) Brian Robinson	1
(United Kingdom) Point Preparations	Porsche 911 GT2	Porsche 3.6 L Turbo Flat-6	D	40	(United Kingdom) Calum Lockie	2–5
(United Kingdom) Chas Berger Motorsport	Ultima GTR	Ford Cosworth YBT 2.0 L Turbo I4	D	42	(United Kingdom) Robin Rex	2–4, 8
(United Kingdom) Chas Berger Motorsport	Ultima GTR	Ford Cosworth YBT 2.0 L Turbo I4	D	42	(United Kingdom) Terry Pudwell	2, 8
(United Kingdom) Chas Berger Motorsport	Ultima GTR	Ford Cosworth YBT 2.0 L Turbo I4	D	42	(United Kingdom) Ian Astley	3–4
(United Kingdom) Sail/Deloitte & Touche	Lotus Esprit V8	Lotus Type-918 3.5 L Turbo V8	D	43	(United Kingdom) Ian Astley	5–11
(United Kingdom) Sail/Deloitte & Touche	Lotus Esprit V8	Lotus Type-918 3.5 L Turbo V8	D	43	(United Kingdom) Mike Youles	5–9, 11
(United Kingdom) Sail/Deloitte & Touche	Lotus Esprit V8	Lotus Type-918 3.5 L Turbo V8	D	43	(United Kingdom) Chris Ellis	10
(United Kingdom) PK Sport	Porsche 911 GT2	Porsche 3.6 L Turbo Flat-6	D	44	(United Kingdom) Marcus Fothergill	All
(United Kingdom) PK Sport	Porsche 911 GT2	Porsche 3.6 L Turbo Flat-6	D	44	(United Kingdom) Paul Fuller	All
(United Kingdom) PK Sport	Porsche 911 GT2	Porsche 3.6 L Turbo Flat-6	D	88	(United Kingdom) Paul Phillips	2–3, 5–10
(United Kingdom) PK Sport	Porsche 911 GT2	Porsche 3.6 L Turbo Flat-6	D	88	(United Kingdom) Mike Youles	2–3
(United Kingdom) PK Sport	Porsche 911 GT2	Porsche 3.6 L Turbo Flat-6	D	88	(United Kingdom) Nigel Barrett	5
(United Kingdom) PK Sport	Porsche 911 GT2	Porsche 3.6 L Turbo Flat-6	D	88	(United Kingdom) Caroline Lucas	6–7
(United Kingdom) PK Sport	Porsche 911 GT2	Porsche 3.6 L Turbo Flat-6	D	88	(United Kingdom) Robin Liddell	8, 10–11
(United Kingdom) PK Sport	Porsche 911 GT2	Porsche 3.6 L Turbo Flat-6	D	88	(United Kingdom) Stephen Day	9
(United Kingdom) PK Sport	Porsche 911 GT2	Porsche 3.6 L Turbo Flat-6	D	88	(United Kingdom) Stephen Radcliffe	11
(Netherlands) Marcos Racing International	Marcos LM600	Chevrolet 5.9 L V8	D	46	(United Kingdom) Calum Lockie	8–11
(Netherlands) Marcos Racing International	Marcos LM600	Chevrolet 5.9 L V8	D	46	(Netherlands) Cor Euser	8, 10–11
(Netherlands) Marcos Racing International	Marcos LM600	Chevrolet 5.9 L V8	D	46	(United Kingdom) Chris Ward	9
(United Kingdom) Anglo American Autocare	Darrian T90	Ford 2.0 L Turbo I4	A	50	(United Kingdom) Steve Griffiths	5, 8, 10
(United Kingdom) Anglo American Autocare	Darrian T90	Ford 2.0 L Turbo I4	A	50	(United Kingdom) Alvin Powell	5
(United Kingdom) Anglo American Autocare	Darrian T90	Ford 2.0 L Turbo I4	A	50	(United Kingdom) Michael Nippers	8, 10
(United Kingdom) Gérard MacQuillan	Porsche 911 Carrera RSR	Porsche 3.8 L Flat-6		51	(United Kingdom) Gérard MacQuillan	5
(United Kingdom) Gérard MacQuillan	Porsche 911 Carrera RSR	Porsche 3.8 L Flat-6		51	(United Kingdom) Alec Hammond	5
(United Kingdom) Gérard MacQuillan	Porsche 911 GT2	Porsche 3.6 L Turbo Flat-6		52	(United Kingdom) Gary Ayles	5
(United Kingdom) Gérard MacQuillan	Porsche 911 GT2	Porsche 3.6 L Turbo Flat-6		52	(United Kingdom) Julian Westwood	5
(United Kingdom) David Welz Racing	Porsche 911 GT	Porsche	D	53	(United Kingdom) David Welz	1, 4, 10–11
(United Kingdom) David Welz Racing	Porsche 911 GT	Porsche	D	53	(United Kingdom) Calum Lockie	1
(Sweden) Henrik Roos Viper Team	Chrysler Viper GTS-R	Chrysler 356-T6 8.0 L V10	P	54	(Sweden) Henrik Roos	10
(United Kingdom) Tomb Raider with Ian Jacobs Racing	Venturi 400GTR	Renault PRV 3.0 L Turbo V6		55	(United Kingdom) Ian Jacobs	3–5
(United Kingdom) Tomb Raider with Ian Jacobs Racing	Venturi 400GTR	Renault PRV 3.0 L Turbo V6		55	(United Kingdom) David Smith	3–5
(United Kingdom) VPM Racing	Porsche 911 Carrera RSR	Porsche 3.8 L Flat-6		65	(United Kingdom) Graham Reeder	1, 5
(United Kingdom) VPM Racing	Porsche 911 Carrera RSR	Porsche 3.8 L Flat-6		65	(Portugal) Nuno Brito Cunha	1, 5
(United Kingdom) Riverside Motorsport	Venturi 400GTR	Renault PRV 3.0 L Turbo V6	D	66	(United Kingdom) Paul Cope	1–2, 4–8, 10–11
(United Kingdom) Riverside Motorsport	Venturi 400GTR	Renault PRV 3.0 L Turbo V6	D	66	(United Kingdom) Glenn Dudley	1–2, 5
(United Kingdom) Riverside Motorsport	Venturi 400GTR	Renault PRV 3.0 L Turbo V6	D	66	(United Kingdom) David Smith	6–8, 10–11
(United Kingdom) Brookspeed Racing Ltd.	Marcos Mantis	Ford 5.0 L V8		69	(United Kingdom) Curtis Hayles	1
(United Kingdom) Brookspeed Racing Ltd.	Marcos Mantis	Ford 5.0 L V8		69	(United Kingdom) Kilian Konig	1
(United Kingdom) Brookspeed Racing Ltd.	Chrysler Viper GTS-R	Chrysler 356-T6 8.0 L V10		69	(United Kingdom) Curtis Hayles	2–3
(United Kingdom) Brookspeed Racing Ltd.	Chrysler Viper GTS-R	Chrysler 356-T6 8.0 L V10		69	(United Kingdom) Kilian Konig	2–3
(United Kingdom) Brookspeed Racing Ltd.	Chrysler Viper GTS-R	Chrysler 356-T6 8.0 L V10		99	(United Kingdom) Dave Clark	1–2, 5
(United Kingdom) Brookspeed Racing Ltd.	Chrysler Viper GTS-R	Chrysler 356-T6 8.0 L V10		99	(New Zealand) Neil Cunningham	1–2
(United Kingdom) Brookspeed Racing Ltd.	Chrysler Viper GTS-R	Chrysler 356-T6 8.0 L V10		99	(United Kingdom) Ian Flux	5
(United Kingdom) Marcos Cars/NCK Motorsport	Marcos LM600	Chevrolet 5.9 L V8	D	77	(United Kingdom) Andy Purvis	All
(United Kingdom) Marcos Cars/NCK Motorsport	Marcos LM600	Chevrolet 5.9 L V8	D	77	(Brazil) Thomas Erdos	All
(United Kingdom) Marcos Cars/NCK Motorsport	Marcos LM500	Rover 5.0 L V8	D	78	(United Kingdom) Graham Millward	5, 11
(United Kingdom) Marcos Cars/NCK Motorsport	Marcos LM500	Rover 5.0 L V8	D	78	(United Kingdom) Bob Sands	5
(United Kingdom) Marcos Cars/NCK Motorsport	Marcos LM500	Rover 5.0 L V8	D	78	(United Kingdom) Calum Lockie	6–7
(United Kingdom) Marcos Cars/NCK Motorsport	Marcos LM500	Rover 5.0 L V8	D	78	(United Kingdom) Chris Marsh	6–7
(United Kingdom) Marcos Cars/NCK Motorsport	Marcos LM500	Rover 5.0 L V8	D	78	(United Kingdom) Martin Byford	11
(United Kingdom) Swansea Institute Team Darrian	Darrian T90	Ford 2.0 L Turbo I4	A	90	(United Kingdom) Matthew Manderson	4–5
(United Kingdom) Swansea Institute Team Darrian	Darrian T90	Ford 2.0 L Turbo I4	A	90	(United Kingdom) Frank Bradley	4–5

== Race results ==
Rnd	Circuit	GT1 Winning Team	GT2 Winning Team
Rnd	Circuit	GT1 Winning Drivers	GT2 Winning Drivers
1	Silverstone	(United Kingdom) No. 1 EMKA Racing Ltd.	(United Kingdom) No. 33 Gaumont/Parr Motorsport
1	Silverstone	(United Kingdom) Steve O'Rourke (United Kingdom) Tim Sugden	(United Kingdom) Jason Saunders (United Kingdom) Stephen Day
2	Oulton Park	(United Kingdom) No. 14 Newcastle United Lister Storm	(United Kingdom) No. 40 Point Preparations
2	Oulton Park	(United Kingdom) Jamie Campbell-Walter (United Kingdom) Julian Bailey	(United Kingdom) Peter Cook (United Kingdom) Calum Lockie
3	Snetterton	(United Kingdom) No. 14 Newcastle United Lister Storm	(United Kingdom) No. 32 Cirtek Motorsport
3	Snetterton	(United Kingdom) Jamie Campbell-Walter (United Kingdom) Julian Bailey	(United Kingdom) David Warnock (United Kingdom) Robert Schirle
4	Brands Hatch	(United Kingdom) No. 14 Newcastle United Lister Storm	(United Kingdom) No. 32 Cirtek Motorsport
4	Brands Hatch	(United Kingdom) Jamie Campbell-Walter (United Kingdom) Julian Bailey	(United Kingdom) David Warnock (United Kingdom) Robert Schirle
5	Silverstone	(United Kingdom) No. 5 Blue Coral Slick 50 Racing	(United Kingdom) No. 32 Cirtek Motorsport
5	Silverstone	(Sweden) Magnus Wallinder (United Kingdom) Geoff Lister	(United Kingdom) David Warnock (United Kingdom) Robert Schirle
6	Donington Park	(United Kingdom) No. 14 Newcastle United Lister Storm	(United Kingdom) No. 32 Cirtek Motorsport
6	Donington Park	(United Kingdom) Jamie Campbell-Walter (United Kingdom) Julian Bailey	(United Kingdom) David Warnock (United Kingdom) Robert Schirle
7	Donington Park	(United Kingdom) No. 14 Newcastle United Lister Storm	(United Kingdom) No. 32 Cirtek Motorsport
7	Donington Park	(United Kingdom) Jamie Campbell-Walter (United Kingdom) Julian Bailey	(United Kingdom) David Warnock (United Kingdom) Robert Schirle
8	Silverstone	(United Kingdom) No. 0 Sintura Racing with Eversham Micros	(United Kingdom) No. 32 Cirtek Motorsport
8	Silverstone	(United Kingdom) Kurt Luby (United Kingdom) Richard Dean	(United Kingdom) David Warnock (United Kingdom) Robert Schirle
9	Croft	(United Kingdom) No. 14 Newcastle United Lister Storm	(United Kingdom) No. 43 Sail/Deloitte & Touche
9	Croft	(United Kingdom) Jamie Campbell-Walter (United Kingdom) Julian Bailey	(United Kingdom) Ian Astley (United Kingdom) Mike Youles
10	Spa-Francorchamps	(United Kingdom) No. 14 Newcastle United Lister Storm	(Netherlands) No. 46 Marcos Racing International
10	Spa-Francorchamps	(United Kingdom) Jamie Campbell-Walter (United Kingdom) Julian Bailey	(Netherlands) Cor Euser (United Kingdom) Calum Lockie
11	Silverstone	(United Kingdom) No. 5 Blue Coral Slick 50 Racing	(United Kingdom) No. 35 Lister Storm Racing
11	Silverstone	(Sweden) Magnus Wallinder (United Kingdom) Geoff Lister	(Denmark) Thorkild Thyrring (United Kingdom) William Hewland

== GT1 Championship Standings ==
Points are awarded as follows:

1st	2nd	3rd	4th	5th	6th	7th	8th	9th	10th
20	15	12	10	8	6	4	3	2	1

(key)

Pos.	Drivers	Team	SIL (United Kingdom)	OUL (United Kingdom)	SNE (United Kingdom)	BRH (United Kingdom)	SIL (United Kingdom)	DON (United Kingdom)	DON (United Kingdom)	SIL (United Kingdom)	CRO (United Kingdom)	SPA (Belgium)	SIL (United Kingdom)	Pts.
1	(United Kingdom) Jamie Campbell-Walter (United Kingdom) Julian Bailey	(United Kingdom) Newcastle United Lister Storm	3	1	1	1	2	1	1	4	1	1	Ret	177
3	(Sweden) Magnus Wallinder (United Kingdom) Geoff Lister	(United Kingdom) Blue Coral Slick 50 Racing	2	2	(3)	2	1	2	2	2	2	3	1	157 (169)
5	(United Kingdom) Tim Sugden	(United Kingdom) EMKA Racing	1	4	Ret	3	Ret	4	3	3	3	4	Ret	98
5	(United Kingdom) Steve O'Rourke	(United Kingdom) EMKA Racing	1	4	WD	3	Ret	4	3	3	3	4	Ret	98
7	(United Kingdom) Kurt Luby (United Kingdom) Richard Dean	(United Kingdom) Sintura Racing				Ret	3	3	Ret	1	Ret	2		59
9	(United Kingdom) Chris Goodwin	(United Kingdom) AM Racing	5	3	2	4	4							55
10	(United Kingdom) James Munroe	(United Kingdom) AM Racing	5	DNP	2	4	4							43
11	(United Kingdom) John Morrison	(United Kingdom) G-Force Motorsport Ltd.				5	Ret	DNS	DNS			5	2	31
12	(United Kingdom) Mike Quaife (United Kingdom) Simon Duerden	(United Kingdom) Quaife Engineering					DNP	Ret	Ret	5	DNP	6	3	26
14	(United Kingdom) John Greasley	(United Kingdom) G-Force Motorsport Ltd.	6	5		5	Ret	DNS	DNS					22
15	(United Kingdom) Jamie Masarati (United Kingdom) Gavin Mortimer	(United Kingdom) RMA Driving Sensations	DNP		DNP		5	NC	NC				4	18
17	(United Kingdom) Sean Walker	(United Kingdom) G-Force Motorsport Ltd.											2	15
18	(Denmark) Thorkild Thyrring	(United Kingdom) G-Force Motorsport Ltd.	6	5										14
19	(Monaco) Stéphane Ortelli (United Kingdom) David Saunders	(United Kingdom) Gaumont/Parr Motorsport	4											10
21	(United Kingdom) Nigel Barrett	(United Kingdom) G-Force Motorsport Ltd.										5		10
-	(Germany) Klaus Abbelen	(Germany) Klaus Abbelen										Ret		0
Pos.	Drivers	Team	SIL (United Kingdom)	OUL (United Kingdom)	SNE (United Kingdom)	BRH (United Kingdom)	SIL (United Kingdom)	DON (United Kingdom)	DON (United Kingdom)	SIL (United Kingdom)	CRO (United Kingdom)	SPA (Belgium)	SIL (United Kingdom)	Pts.

Key
Colour	Result
Gold	Winner
Silver	Second place
Bronze	Third place
Green	Other points position
Blue	Other classified position
Blue	Not classified, finished (NC)
Purple	Not classified, retired (Ret)
Red	Did not qualify (DNQ)
Red	Did not pre-qualify (DNPQ)
Black	Disqualified (DSQ)
White	Did not start (DNS)
White	Race cancelled (C)
Blank	Did not practice (DNP)
Blank	Excluded (EX)
Blank	Did not arrive (DNA)
Blank	Withdrawn (WD)
Blank	Did not enter (cell empty)
Text formatting	Meaning
**Bold**	Pole position
Italics	Fastest lap

† – Drivers did not finish the race, but were classified as they completed a sufficient number of laps. ^{*} Marcos Mantis challenge competitors

== GT2 Championship Standings ==
Points are awarded as follows:

1st	2nd	3rd	4th	5th	6th	7th	8th	9th	10th
20	15	12	10	8	6	4	3	2	1

(key)

Pos.	Drivers	Team	SIL (United Kingdom)	OUL (United Kingdom)	SNE (United Kingdom)	BRH (United Kingdom)	SIL (United Kingdom)	DON (United Kingdom)	DON (United Kingdom)	SIL (United Kingdom)	CRO (United Kingdom)	SPA (Belgium)	SIL (United Kingdom)	Pts.
1	(United Kingdom) David Warnock	(United Kingdom) Cirtek Motorsport	2	5	1	1	1	1	1	1		DNP	7	147
2	(United Kingdom) Robert Schirle	(United Kingdom) Cirtek Motorsport		5	1	1	1	1	1	1		DNP	7	132
3	(United Kingdom) Mike Youles	(United Kingdom) PK Sport		4	3									109
3	(United Kingdom) Mike Youles	(United Kingdom) Sail/Deloitte & Touche					4	2	2	2	1		3	109
4	(United Kingdom) Marcus Fothergill (United Kingdom) Paul Fuller	(United Kingdom) PK Sport	4	2	4	Ret	5	4	5	5	2	5	6	102
4	(United Kingdom) Ian Astley	(United Kingdom) Chas Berger Motorsport			Ret	Ret								102
4	(United Kingdom) Ian Astley	(United Kingdom) Sail/Deloitte & Touche					4	2	2	2	1	3	3	102
7	(United Kingdom) Calum Lockie	(United Kingdom) David Welz Racing	5											95
7	(United Kingdom) Calum Lockie	(United Kingdom) Point Preparations		1	2	3	6							95
7	(United Kingdom) Calum Lockie	(United Kingdom) Marcos Cars/NCK Motorsport						Ret	NC					95
7	(United Kingdom) Calum Lockie	(Netherlands) Marcos Racing International								4	DNS	1	9	95
8	(Brazil) Thomas Erdos (United Kingdom) Andy Purvis	(United Kingdom) Marcos Cars/NCK Motorsport	3	3	Ret	2	3	Ret	3	Ret	Ret	Ret	2	78
10	(United Kingdom) Peter Cook	(United Kingdom) Point Preparations	6	1	2	3	6							59
12	(United Kingdom) Paul Phillips	(United Kingdom) PK Sport		4	3		7	Ret	6	4	DNS	Ret		42
13	(Denmark) Thorkild Thyrring (United Kingdom) William Hewland	(United Kingdom) Lister Storm Racing				Ret	2						1	35
14	(Netherlands) Cor Euser	(Netherlands) Marcos Racing International								3		1	9	39
14	(United Kingdom) Chris Ellis	(United Kingdom) Mike Haines Racing	Ret	DNS	5	Ret	9			6			8	34
14	(United Kingdom) Chris Ellis	(United Kingdom) Sail/Deloitte & Touche										3		34
16	(United Kingdom) Paul Cope	(United Kingdom) Riverside Motorsport	Ret	Ret	DNP	5	11	6	8	8		DNS	Ret	33
16	(Germany) Nicolaus Springer (United Kingdom) Peter Hardman	(United Kingdom) Lister Storm Racing										4	4	22
19	(United Kingdom) Jason Saunders	(United Kingdom) Gaumont/Parr Motorsport	1	DNP										20
19	(United Kingdom) Stephen Day	(United Kingdom) Gaumont/Parr Motorsport	1	DNP										20
19	(United Kingdom) Stephen Day	(United Kingdom) PK Sport									DNS			20
19	(Australia) Charlie Cox (United Kingdom) Jonathan Baker	(United Kingdom) Cirtek Motorsport					Ret	5	4	Ret		Ret		20
23	(United Kingdom) Robin Liddell	(United Kingdom) PK Sport								4		Ret	5	18
24	(United Kingdom) David Smith	(United Kingdom) Tomb Raider with Ian Jacobs Racing			Ret	Ret	NC							16
24	(United Kingdom) David Smith	(United Kingdom) Riverside Motorsport						6	7	7		DNS	Ret	16
24	(Netherlands) Michael Vergers	(United Kingdom) Mike Haines Racing	Ret	DNP	5	Ret	9			6		DNP		16
26	(Germany) Claudia Hürtgen	(United Kingdom) Cirtek Motorsport	2											15
26	(United Kingdom) Curtis Hayles	(United Kingdom) Brookspeed Racing Ltd.	NC	DNP	DNP									15
26	(United Kingdom) Curtis Hayles	(United Kingdom) HKM/Parr Motorsport						Ret	8		3			15
28	(New Zealand) Neil Cunningham	(United Kingdom) Brookspeed Racing Ltd.	Ret	Ret	DNP									13
28	(New Zealand) Neil Cunningham	(United Kingdom) HKM/Parr Motorsport				4	Ret	Ret	8		Ret	DNS		13
13	(United Kingdom) David Welz	(United Kingdom) David Welz Racing	DNS			7						6	Ret	12
30	(United Kingdom) Kilian Konig	(United Kingdom) Brookspeed Racing Ltd.	DNS	DNP	DNP									15
30	(United Kingdom) Kilian Konig	(United Kingdom) HKM/Parr Motorsport				4	Ret	NC			Ret			15
31	(United Kingdom) Stephen Radcliffe	(United Kingdom) PK Sport											5	8
32	(United Kingdom) Michael Nippers (United Kingdom) Steve Griffiths	(United Kingdom) Anglo American Autocare								NC		7		11
32	(United Kingdom) Michael Nippers (United Kingdom) Steve Griffiths	(United Kingdom) Anglo American Autocare					Ret			NC		7		11
32	(United Kingdom) Robin Rex	(United Kingdom) Chas Berger Motorsport	DNP	6	Ret	Ret	DNP			Ret				6
32	(United Kingdom) Caroline Lucas	(United Kingdom) PK Sport						Ret	6					6
32	(United Kingdom) Frank Bradley (United Kingdom) Matthew Manderson	(United Kingdom) Swansea Institute Team Darrian				6	Ret							6
32	(United Kingdom) Brian Robinson	(United Kingdom) Point Preparations	6											6
32	(United Kingdom) Terry Pudwell	(United Kingdom) Chas Berger Motorsport		6						Ret				6
40	(United Kingdom) Nigel Barrett	(United Kingdom) PK Sport					7							4
40	(United Kingdom) Graham Reeder (Portugal) Nuno Brito Cunha	(United Kingdom) VPM Racing	7				12							4
43	(United Kingdom) Gary Ayles (United Kingdom) Julian Westwood	(United Kingdom) Gérard MacQuillan					8							3
43	(United Kingdom) Marco Attard	(United Kingdom) Mike Haines Racing											8	3
46	(United Kingdom) Dave Clark	(United Kingdom) Brookspeed Racing Ltd.	Ret	Ret	DNP		10							1
46	(United Kingdom) Ian Flux	(United Kingdom) Brookspeed Racing Ltd.					10							1
	(United Kingdom) Glenn Dudley	(United Kingdom) Riverside Motorsport	Ret	Ret			11							0
	(United Kingdom) Graham Millward	(United Kingdom) Marcos Cars/NCK Motorsport					13						Ret	0
	(United Kingdom) Bob Sands	(United Kingdom) Marcos Cars/NCK Motorsport					13							0
	(United Kingdom) Jem Marsh	(United Kingdom) Marcos Cars/NCK Motorsport						Ret	NC					0
	(United Kingdom) Alec Hammond (United Kingdom) Gérard MacQuillan	(United Kingdom) Gérard MacQuillan					NC							0
	(United Kingdom) Alvin Powell	(United Kingdom) Anglo American Autocare						Ret						0
	(United Kingdom) Jeff Wyatt	(United Kingdom) GW Racing					DNP						Ret	0
	(United Kingdom) Mark Newman	(United Kingdom) GW Racing											Ret	0
	(United Kingdom) Martin Byford	(United Kingdom) Marcos Cars/NCK Motorsport											Ret	0
	(Denmark) John Nielsen	(United Kingdom) HKM/Parr Motorsport										DNS		0
	(United Kingdom) Gerry Webb	(United Kingdom) GW Racing					DNP							0
Drivers ineligible to score points
	(Sweden) Henrik Roos	(Sweden) Henrik Roos Viper Team										2		0
	(United Kingdom) Max Beaverbrook (United Kingdom) Martin Stretton	(United Kingdom) BVB Motorsport						3						0
Pos.	Drivers	Team	SIL (United Kingdom)	OUL (United Kingdom)	SNE (United Kingdom)	BRH (United Kingdom)	SIL (United Kingdom)	DON (United Kingdom)	DON (United Kingdom)	SIL (United Kingdom)	CRO (United Kingdom)	SPA (Belgium)	SIL (United Kingdom)	Pts.

Key
Colour	Result
Gold	Winner
Silver	Second place
Bronze	Third place
Green	Other points position
Blue	Other classified position
Blue	Not classified, finished (NC)
Purple	Not classified, retired (Ret)
Red	Did not qualify (DNQ)
Red	Did not pre-qualify (DNPQ)
Black	Disqualified (DSQ)
White	Did not start (DNS)
White	Race cancelled (C)
Blank	Did not practice (DNP)
Blank	Excluded (EX)
Blank	Did not arrive (DNA)
Blank	Withdrawn (WD)
Blank	Did not enter (cell empty)
Text formatting	Meaning
**Bold**	Pole position
Italics	Fastest lap

† – Drivers did not finish the race, but were classified as they completed a sufficient number of laps.
