= Quaife R4 GTS =

British race car

- Category: GT1
- Designer: RT Quaife Engineering Ltd
- Production: 1998

Technical specifications
- Chassis: Steel tube frame
- Suspension: Double wishbone push-rod activated coil springs over anti-shock absorbers, anti-roll bar
- Engine: Ford V8 naturally aspirated, rear mid-mounted
- Transmission: Quaife 6-speed sequential manual
- Tyres: Dunlop

Competition history
- Notable drivers: (United Kingdom) Mike Quaife
- Debut: Silverstone 1998
Races	Wins	Podiums	Poles
14	0	0	0

The Quaife R4 GTS is a grand tourer-style race car designed and built by Quaife Engineering. Built to GT1 regulations, it contested select rounds of the British GT Championship in 1998, 1999, and 2001 as a technology demonstrator for the company's drivetrain products. The R4 GTS is significant for being one of three four-wheel drive GT1 race cars ever produced, the others being its immediate predecessor and the Bugatti EB 110.

== History ==
Beginning in 1996, Quaife Engineering entered the British GT Championship with a heavily modified Ford Escort Cosworth in the GT1 class. Fitted with Quaife's proprietary drivetrain technology, the four-wheel drive Escort contested the championship as a promotional exercise and as an engineering testbed for Quaife's racing products. From 1998 onwards, Quaife retired the Escort and announced a custom GT1 machine designed completely in-house. In order to comply with GT1 homologation requirements, which mandated the production of at least one road legal chassis, Quaife built a single road car in addition to the race car.

Driven by company owner Mike Quaife at all rounds, the R4 GTS achieved a best result of 7th overall on one occasion but struggled to compete against factory machinery including the McLaren F1 GTR, the Porsche 911 GT1, and the Lister Storm GTL. After attempting a majority of races in 1998 and 1999, the R4 GTS made three appearances in 2001 before being quietly retired.
