= Julian Bailey (racing driver) =

British racing driver (born 1961)

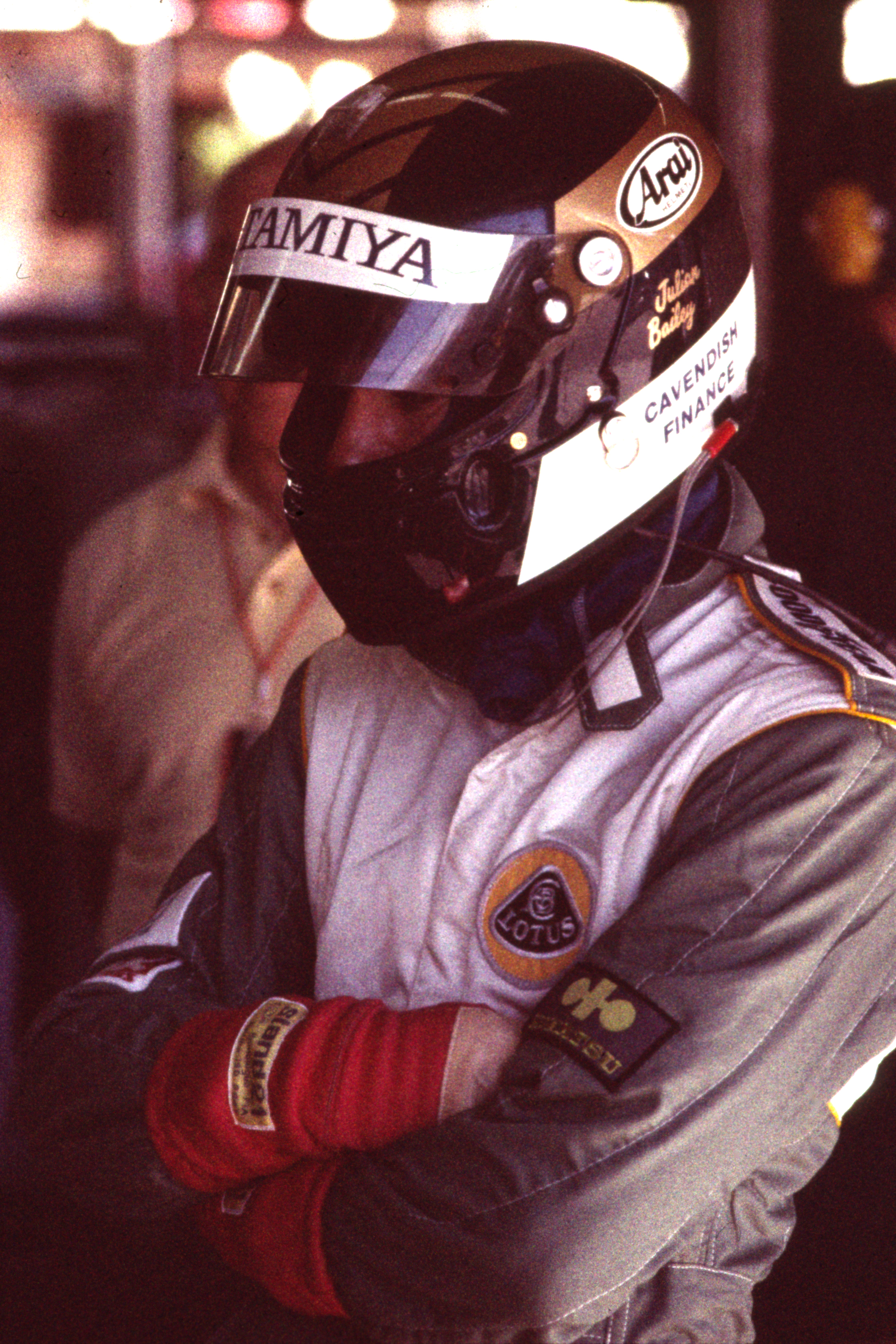
- Bailey at the 1991 United States Grand Prix
- Born: Julian Terence Bailey; 9 October 1961 (age 65); Woolwich, London, England, UK

Formula One World Championship career
- Nationality: (United Kingdom) British
- Active years: 1988, 1991
- Team(s): Tyrrell, Lotus
- Entries: 20 (7 starts)
- Championships: 0
- Wins: 0
- Podiums: 0
- Career points: 1
- Pole positions: 0
- Fastest laps: 0
- First entry: 1988 Brazilian Grand Prix
- Last entry: 1991 Monaco Grand Prix

BTCC career
- Championships: 0
- Wins: 1
- Podiums: 3
- Poles: 1
- Fastest laps: 2
- Best finish: 5th in 1993

Championship titles
- 2000 1999 1999 1982: FIA GT Championship; British GT Championship; Oulton Park International Gold Cup; Formula Ford Festival

Julian Terence Bailey (born 9 October 1961) is a British former Formula One driver from England, who raced for the Tyrrell and Lotus teams.

== Racing career ==
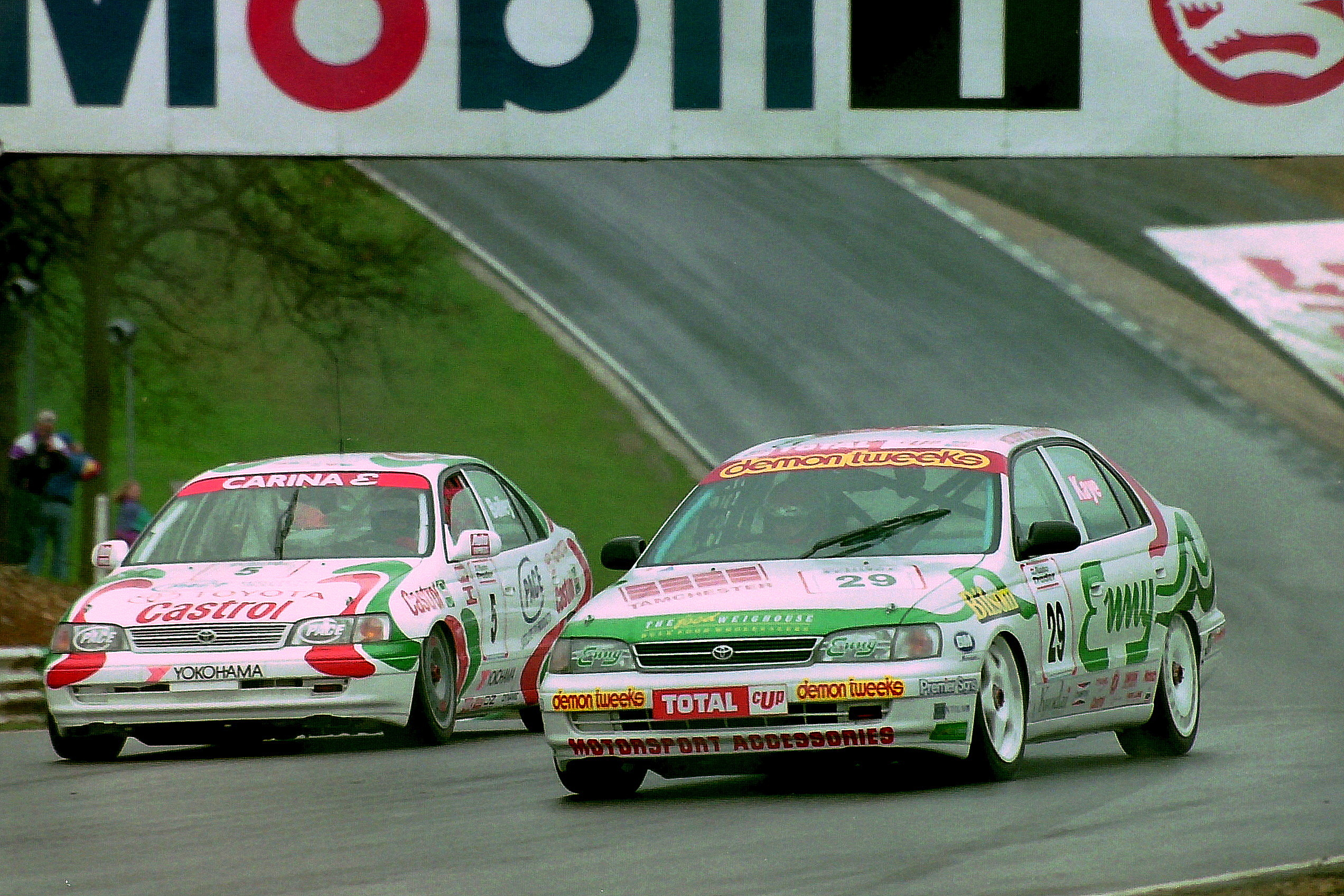
Bailey attempting to overtake James Kaye at Brands Hatch in 1994

Although born in the United Kingdom, Bailey was raised in Menorca, Spain. He became an accomplished Formula Ford 1600 racer in Britain, winning the important Formula Ford Festival at Brands Hatch. In 1987 he got his chance to race in Formula 3000, in a GA Motorsport Lola, in which he won in only his third Formula 3000 race, becoming the first British driver to win a race in the formula. This attracted the attention of Ken Tyrrell, and Bailey was recruited to drive for the Formula One team the following year. The car was very uncompetitive and he did not score a single point, while his teammate Jonathan Palmer scored five. In 1989, he joined the Nissan sports car factory team, and tried to get back into Formula One in 1991 with Lotus. He finished sixth in the San Marino Grand Prix but didn’t retain his drive after Monaco. During his Formula One career, he was entered in 20 Grands Prix, qualifying for seven at a time when the grids were over-subscribed, and scored a total of one championship point.

Bailey's Team Securicor Toyota car from the 1993 British Touring Car Championship

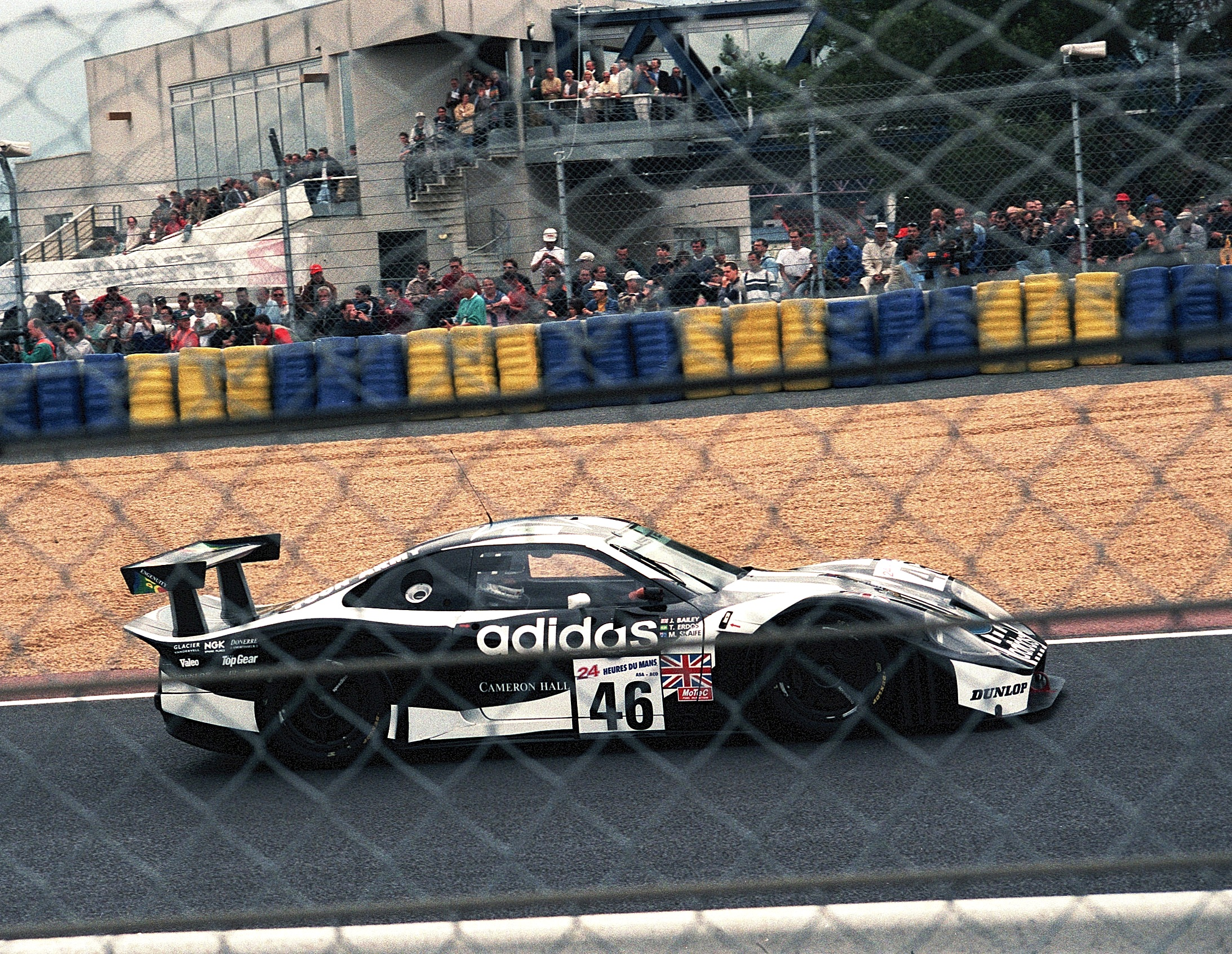
Bailey competing at the 1997 24 Hours of Le Mans

In 1992, Bailey joined the Toyota BTCC team, and the following season, he finished fifth in the championship, although his season is best remembered for his collision with teammate Will Hoy at Silverstone, which flipped Hoy’s car onto its roof leading BBC commentator Murray Walker to quip “The car upside down is a Toyota!” (a play on the company’s UK advertising slogan “The car in front is a Toyota”). In the following round at Knockhill, he took his one and only BTCC win. The next two seasons were less successful, although he outscored 1991 champion Hoy in both their seasons as teammates. Toyota withdrew from the BTCC as a works team at the end of 1995, but Bailey was still contracted to them. For 1996, Bailey competed in the South African Touring Car Championship (SATCC) for Minolta Toyota. He has raced primarily in sports cars since. For 1997, Bailey joined Lister, eventually winning the British GT Championship in 1999 and the FIA GT Championship in 2000 in a Lister Storm.

== Personal life ==
Bailey’s stepson, Jack Clarke, is also a racing driver with experience in Formula BMW and Formula Palmer Audi. In 2009, he graduated to the FIA Formula Two Championship, and in 2014 moved to the British Touring Car Championship.

=== Post-racing career ===
In 2008, Bailey joined with ESPN STAR Sports as a guest commentator for a number of Formula One races.

=== Top Gear ===
On the television programme, Top Gear, he was one of several drivers to appear as The Stig.

== Racing record ==
=== Complete International Formula 3000 results ===
(key) (Races in ‘’’bold’’’ indicate pole position; races in ‘’italics’’ indicate fastest lap.)

Year	Entrant	1	2	3	4	5	6	7	8	9	10	11	DC	Points
1987	GA Motorsports	SIL	VAL	SPA	PAU	DON; Ret	PER; 4	BRH; 1	BIR; Ret	IMO; NC	BUG; 6	JAR; Ret	7th	13

=== Complete Formula One World Championship results ===
(key)

Year	Entrant	Chassis	Engine	1	2	3	4	5	6	7	8	9	10	11	12	13	14	15	16	WDC	Points
1988	Tyrrell Racing Organisation	Tyrrell 017	Cosworth V8	BRA; DNQ	SMR; Ret	MON; DNQ	MEX; DNQ	CAN; Ret	DET; 9	FRA; DNQ	GBR; 16	GER; DNQ	HUN; DNQ	BEL; DNQ	ITA; 12	POR; DNQ	ESP; DNQ	JPN; 14	AUS; DNQ	NC	0
1991	Team Lotus	Lotus 102B	Judd V8	USA; DNQ	BRA; DNQ	SMR; 6	MON; DNQ	CAN	MEX	FRA	GBR	GER	HUN	BEL	ITA	POR	ESP	JPN	AUS	18th	1

=== Complete 24 Hours of Le Mans results ===
Year	Team	Co-Drivers	Car	Class	Laps	Pos.	Class Pos.
1989	(Japan) Nissan Motorsports	(United Kingdom) Mark Blundell (United Kingdom) Martin Donnelly	Nissan R89C	C1	5	DNF	DNF
1990	(Japan) Nissan Motorsports International	(United Kingdom) Mark Blundell (Italy) Gianfranco Brancatelli	Nissan R90CK	C1	142	DNF	DNF
1997	(United Kingdom) Newcastle United Lister	(Brazil) Thomas Erdos (Australia) Mark Skaife	Lister Storm GTL	GT1	77	DNF	DNF
2001	(United Kingdom) MG Sport & Racing Ltd.	(United Kingdom) Mark Blundell (United Kingdom) Kevin McGarrity	MG-Lola EX257	LMP675	92	DNF	DNF
2002	(United Kingdom) MG Sport & Racing Ltd.	(United Kingdom) Mark Blundell (United Kingdom) Kevin McGarrity	MG-Lola EX257	LMP675	219	DNF	DNF

=== Complete British Touring Car Championship results ===
(key) (Races in bold indicate pole position) (Races in italics indicate fastest lap)

Year	Team	Car	1	2	3	4	5	6	7	8	9	10	11	12	13	14	15	16	17	18	19	20	21	22	23	24	25	Pos	Pts
1991	Nissan Janspeed Racing	Nissan Primera eGT	SIL	SNE	DON	THR	SIL	BRH	SIL	DON; 1	DON; 2	OUL	BRH; 1	BRH; 2	DON; Ret	THR; Ret	SIL; 12											NC	0
1992	Team Securicor ICS Toyota	Toyota Carina	SIL	THR	OUL	SNE	BRH	DON; 1	DON; 2	SIL	KNO; 1	KNO; 2	PEM	BRH; 1; 16	BRH; 2 Ret	DON; 9	SIL; 13											23rd	2
1993	Team Securicor Toyota	Toyota Carina E	SIL; Ret	DON; 7	SNE; 2	DON; 5	OUL; 15	BRH; 1; 6	BRH; 2; 9	PEM; 4	SIL; Ret	**KNO**; **1**; 2	KNO; 2; 1	OUL; 5	BRH; 7	THR; 7	DON; 1; 7	DON; 2; 17	SIL; 6									5th	88
1994	Toyota Castrol Racing	Toyota Carina E	THR; 20	BRH; 1; 19	BRH; 2; 10	SNE; Ret	SIL; 1; 10	SIL; 2; 5	OUL; 10	DON; 1; 8	DON; 2; 5	BRH; 1; 11	BRH; 2; 9	SIL; DNS	KNO; 1; 8	KNO; 2; 7	OUL; 9	BRH; 1; 10	BRH; 2; 6	SIL; 1; 5	SIL; 2; 6	DON; 1; 6	DON; 2; 6					12th	66
1995	Team Toyota GB	Toyota Carina E	DON; 1 Ret	DON; 2 Ret	BRH; 1; 6	BRH; 2; 8	THR; 1; 7	THR; 2; 8	SIL; 1 Ret	SIL; 2 DNS	OUL; 1; 4	OUL; 2; 9	BRH; 1; 6	BRH; 2; 6	DON; 1; 6	DON; 2; 7	SIL; 4	KNO; 1; 6	KNO; 2; 9	BRH; 1; 9	BRH; 2 Ret	SNE; 1; 11	SNE; 2; 6	OUL; 1 Ret	OUL; 2; 4	SIL; 1 Ret	SIL; 2; 5	9th	94

=== Complete Bathurst 1000 results ===
Year	Team	Co-driver	Car	Laps	Pos.
1997*	(Australia) FAI Insurance	(Australia) Warren Luff	Honda Accord	138	10th

* Super Touring race

=== Complete FIA GT Championship results ===
(key) (Races in bold indicate pole position) (Races in italics indicate fastest lap)

Year	Team	Class	Car	Engine	1	2	3	4	5	6	7	8	9	10	11	Pos.	Points
1997	Newcastle United Lister Storm	GT1	Lister Storm	Jaguar 7.0 L V12	HOC	SIL	HEL	NÜR	SPA	A1R	SUZ	DON	MUG	SEB; Ret	LAG; Ret	NC	0
1999	Lister Storm Racing	GT	Lister Storm GT2	Jaguar 7.0 L V12	MNZ; Ret	SIL; Ret	HOC; 4	HUN	**ZOL**; 12	OSC	**DON**; 2	HOM	GLN	ZHU		17th	9
2000	Lister Storm Racing	GT	Lister Storm GTM	Jaguar 7.0 L V12	**VAL**; 1	**EST**; 1	MNZ; 3	**SIL**; 1	HUN; Ret	**ZOL**; 1	A1R; Ret	LAU; 3	**BRN**; 2	MAG; 1		1st	59
2001	Lister Storm Racing	GT	Lister Storm GTM	Jaguar 7.0 L V12	MNZ; Ret	BRN; 9	MAG; 5	SIL; Ret	ZOL; Ret	HUN; 4	SPA	A1R; 4	NÜR; 6	JAR; 5	EST; 7	16th	11

=== Partial British GT Championship results ===
(key) (Races in bold indicate pole position) (Races in italics indicate fastest lap)

Year	Team	Car	Class	1	2	3	4	5	6	7	8	9	10	11	12	Pos	Points
1998	Newcastle United Lister Storm	Lister Storm	GT1	SIL; 1 ?	OUL; 1 ?	CRO; 1 ?	SNE; 1; 1	SIL; 2 ?	DON; 1 ?	SIL; 2; 1	SPA; 1 ?	SIL; 3; 1				3rd	112
1999	Newcastle United Lister Storm	Lister Storm	GT1	SIL; 1; 3	OUL; 1; 1	SNE; 1; 1	BRH; 1; 1	SIL; 2; 2	DON; 1; 1	**DON**; **2**; 1	SIL; 2; 4	CRO; 1; 1	SPA; 1; 1	SPA; 1 Ret	**SIL**; **1** Ret	1st	177
2000	Cirtek Motorsport	Lister Storm	GT	THR; 1	CRO; 1	OUL; 1	DON; 1	SIL; 1	BRH; 1	DON; 1	CRO; 1	SIL; 1	SNE; 1	SPA; 1	SIL; 1; 2	25th	15

Sporting positions
Preceded by Tommy Byrne	Formula Ford Festival; Winner; 1982	Succeeded by Andrew Gilbert Scott
Preceded by Steve O'Rourke; Tim Sugden	British GT Championship; Champion; 1999; With: Jamie Campbell-Walter	Succeeded by Calum Lockie
Preceded by Olivier Beretta; Karl Wendlinger	FIA GT Championship; Champion; 2000; With: Jamie Campbell-Walter	Succeeded by Christophe Bouchut; Jean-Philippe Belloc
