= Jonathan Baker (racing driver) =

British racing driver

Jonathan Baker (born 20 December 1959) is a British former racing driver.

== See also ==
- Motorsport in the United Kingdom
