= Lister Storm =

British racing car

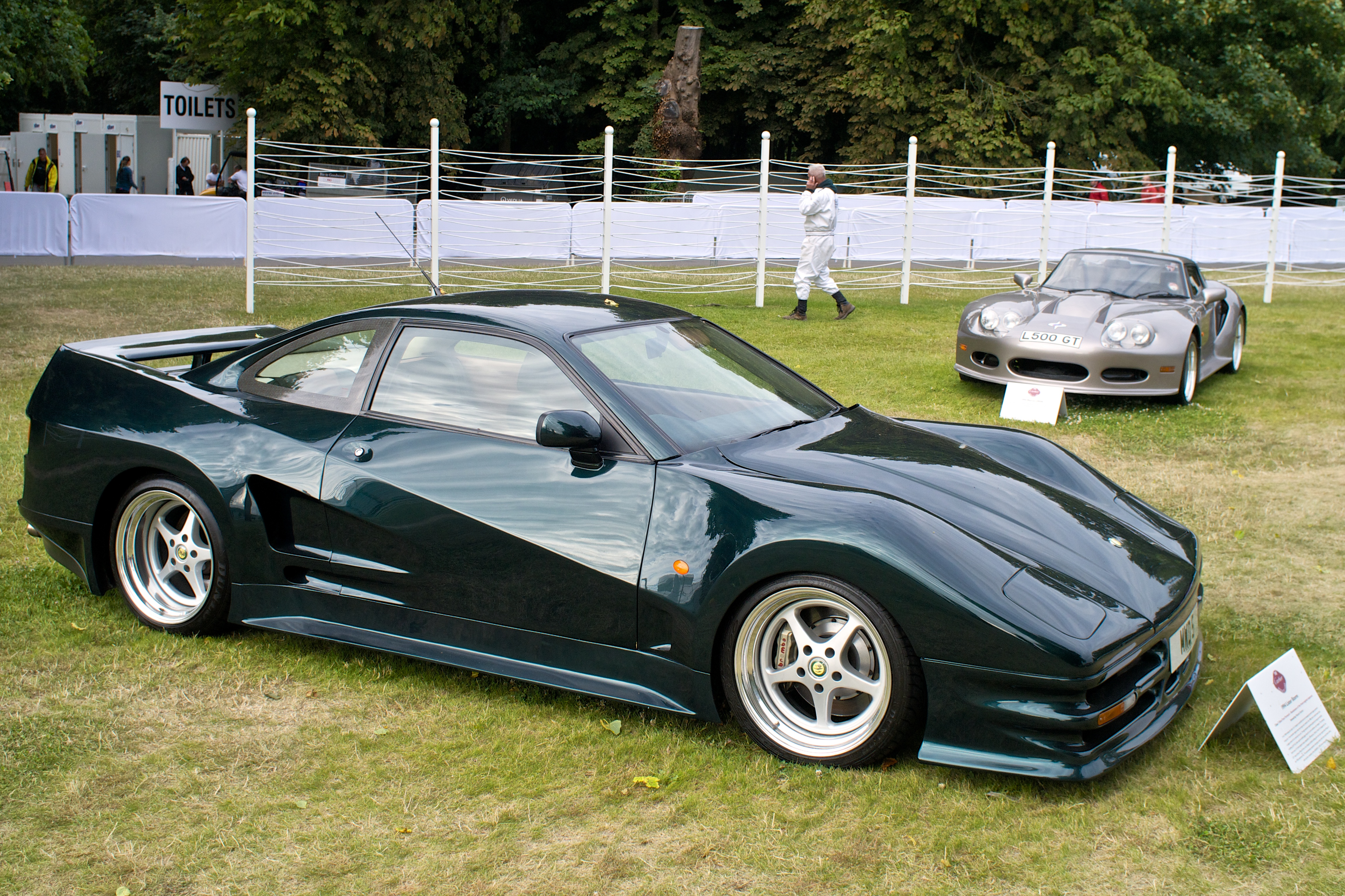

Overview
- Manufacturer: Lister Cars
- Production: 1993–1994 (road car)
- Assembly: Cambridge, United Kingdom
- Designer: Mike Hughes

Body and chassis
- Class: Grand tourer (S); Racing Car
- Body style: 2-door 2+2 coupé 2-door coupé
- Layout: Front-engine, rear-wheel-drive
- Related: Jaguar XJR-9

Powertrain
- Engine: 6,996 cc (7.0 L) Jaguar V12
- Transmission: 6-speed Getrag manual

Dimensions
- Wheelbase: 2,590 mm (102.0 in)
- Length: 4,547 mm (179.0 in)
- Width: 1,981 mm (78.0 in)
- Height: 1,320 mm (52.0 in)
- Kerb weight: 1,664 kg (3,668 lb)

The Lister Storm is a homologated GT racing car manufactured by British low-volume automobile manufacturer Lister Cars with production beginning in 1993.

== Road car ==
The Storm used the largest V12 engine fitted to a production road car since the Second World War, a 7.0 L (6,996 cc (7.0 L) Jaguar unit based on the one used in the Jaguar XJR-9 that competed at the 24 Hours of Le Mans.

Due to the high price of the vehicle at £220,000, only four examples were produced before production of the road-going Storm ceased. For several years, the Storm was considered the fastest four-seat grand tourer on sale.

The Storm featured Kevlar and aluminium panels over aluminium honeycomb monocoque. The doors and greenhouse were borrowed from the Volkswagen Corrado. Its design resulted in a drag coefficient of Cd=0.35.

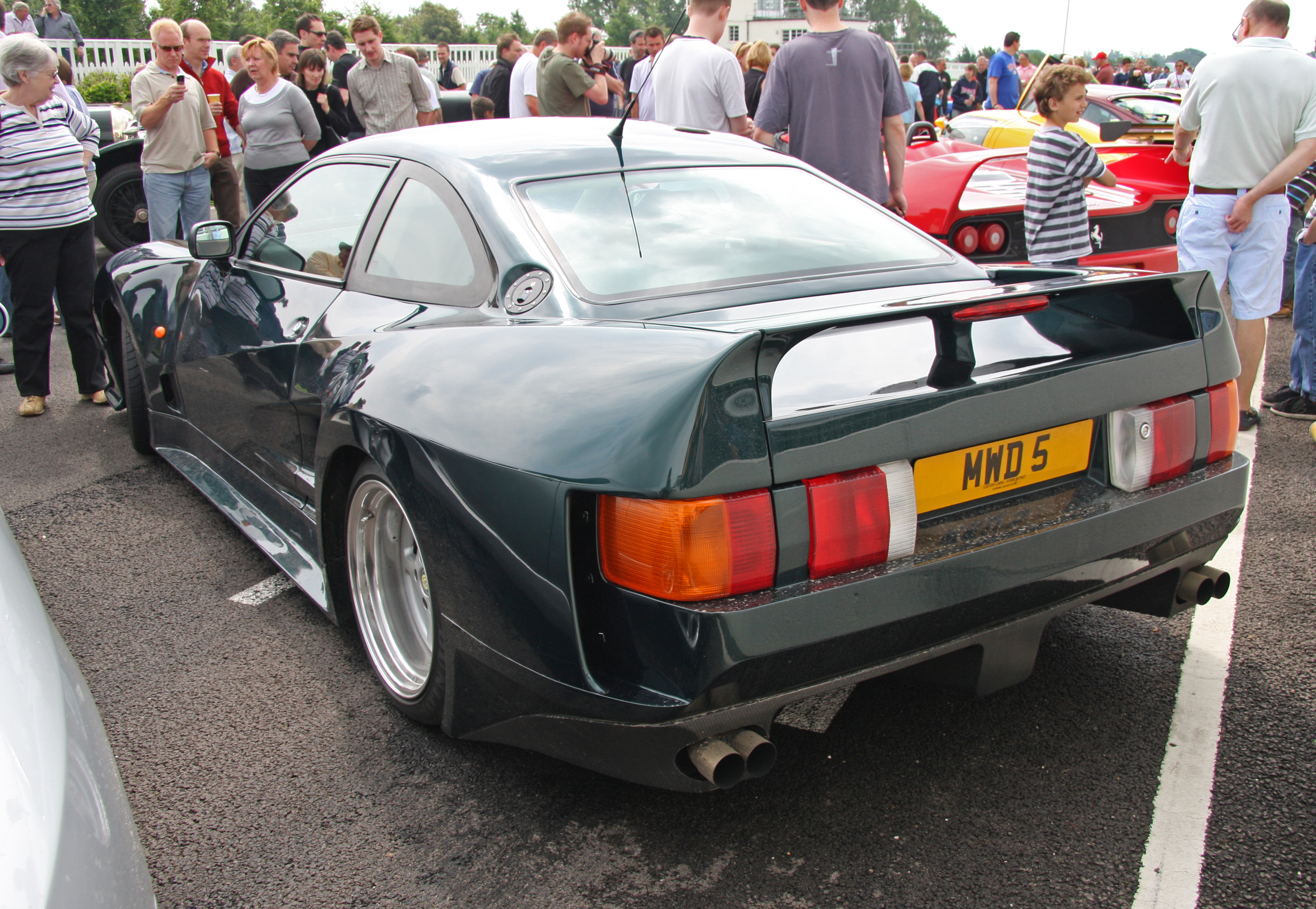
Rear three-quarters view

The bored and stroked twenty-four-valve V12 engine generated a maximum power output of 554 PS (407 kW; 546 hp) at 6,100 rpm and 790 N⋅m (582.7 lb⋅ft) of torque at 3,450 rpm with a compression of 10.5:1. The car weighed 1,664 kg (3,668.5 lb), accelerated from 0–97 km/h (60 mph) in 4.1 seconds, and a claimed a top speed of 335 km/h (208 mph).

== Storm GTS ==
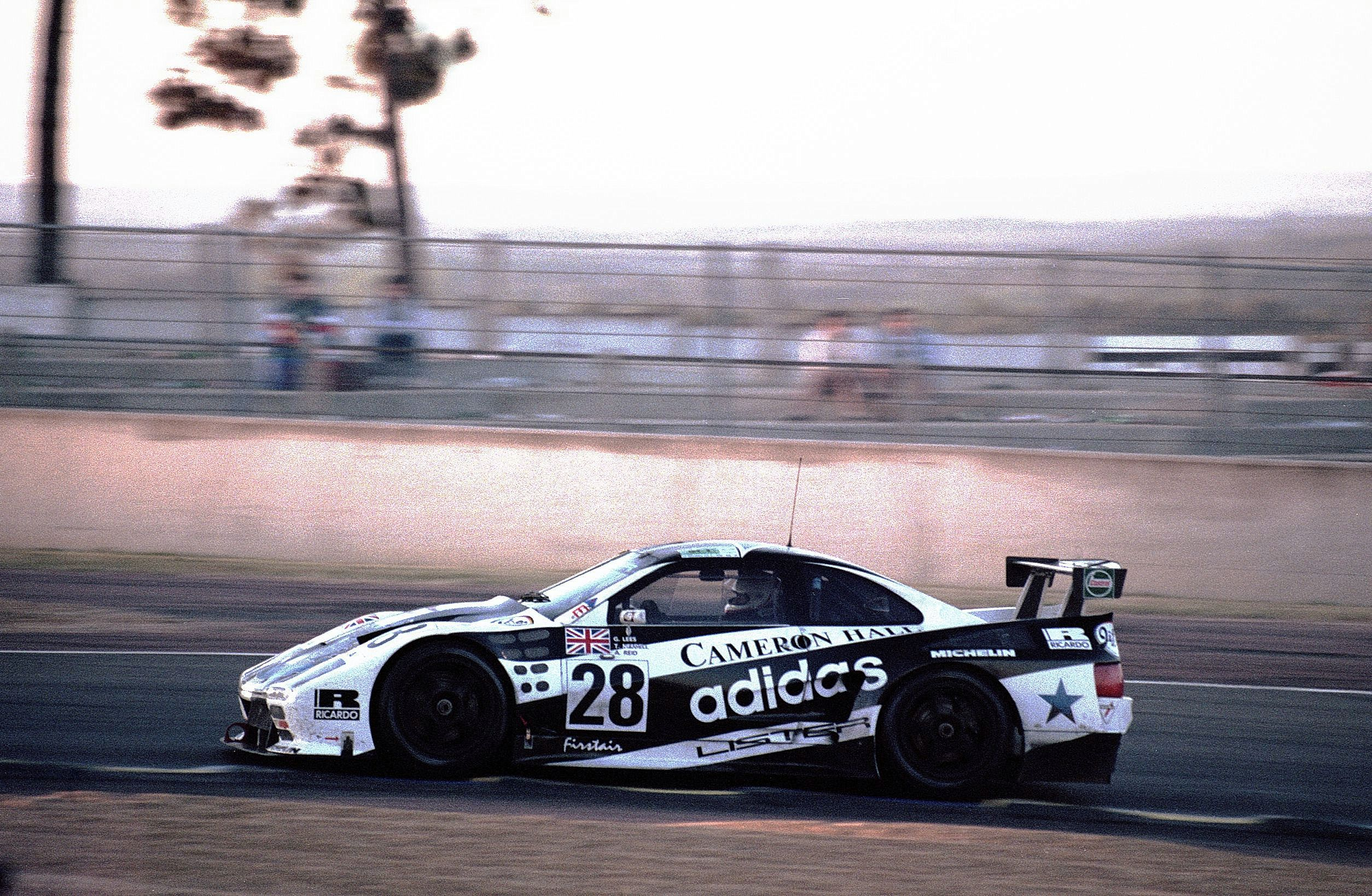
A Lister Storm GTS driven at the 1996 24 Hours of Le Mans

The Lister Storm GTS debuted at the 1995 24 Hours of Le Mans as a competitor in the GT1 class, going up against cars such as the McLaren F1 GTR, Ferrari F40 LM, Jaguar XJ220S, and the Porsche 911 GT2. The car, driven by Geoff Lees, Rupert Keegan, and Dominic Chappell, did not perform well, failing to finish due to gearbox failure after 40 laps.

In 1996, the team signed a sponsorship deal with football club Newcastle United and hired engineer Geoff Kingston. Changes included bodywork, brakes, and moving the engine 5 inches (13 cm) back to improve weight distribution, which put the driver next to the last three cylinders. The Hewland gearbox was relocated to the rear, replacing the 5-speed unit with a transverse 6-speed sequential. To further compensate for the heavy engine, they put the wide rear tires on the front, allowing them to stiffen up the front suspension while still getting compliance from the thicker sidewalls.

The team decided to give the updated Storm an early test for Le Mans by entering a lone car in the 24 Hours of Daytona, driven by ex-F1 drivers Geoff Lees, Tiff Needell, and Kenny Acheson. It failed to finish due to a high-speed crash while Acheson was behind the wheel. The car was destroyed and according to an interview in Octane in November 2020, Kenny suffered from temporary vision loss in his right eye, chest injuries, a broken rib, and still suffers from a reduced lung capacity on the left side.

Even with this letdown, the team pushed on towards Le Mans with the Storm GTS. A new car had to be built by G-Force due to the timescales involved. Lees and Needell were joined by Anthony Reid. The car was able to improve on its disappointing start by finishing the race in 1996, although it was classified in 19th place, 59 laps behind the winner. Lister decided after Le Mans that they would enter the Storm GTS into the BPR Global GT Series, debuting in the fifth round at the Nürburgring but retired while in third place. The car was then entered at the Suzuka 1000km with Christophe Bouchut this time joining Lees and Needell. It was running in third, before retiring thanks to gearbox troubles.

The car once again proved its speed during round eight of the 1996 BPR Global GT Series at Brands Hatch, qualifying third overall. It sadly retired, this time with an engine issue, while still in that third position.

== Storm GTL ==
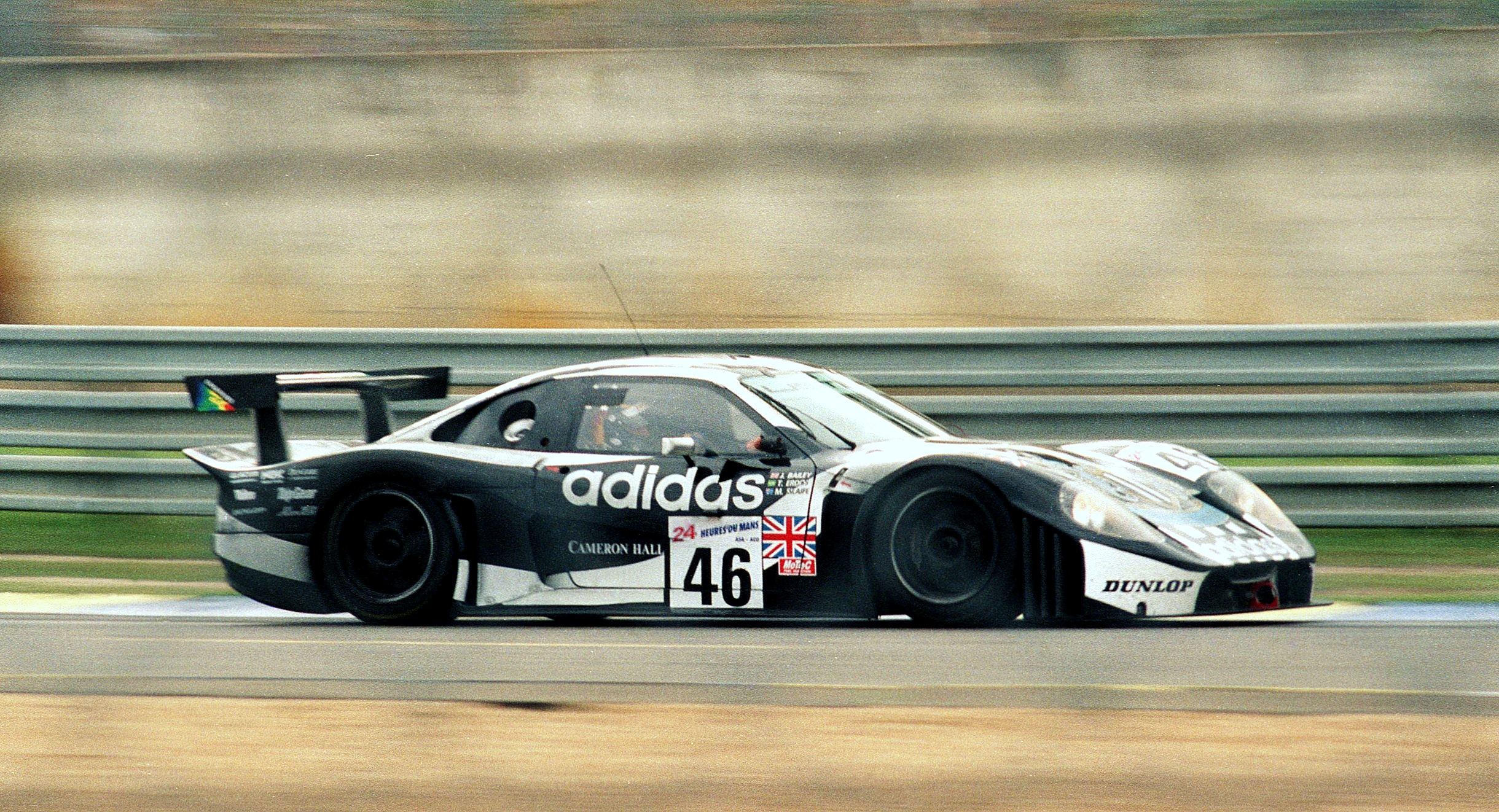
A Lister Storm GTL driven at the 1997 24 Hours of Le Mans

For 1997, Lister realized that the Storm GTS was too slow in comparison to some of the newer GT1 class competitors, such as the Mercedes-Benz CLK GTR and Porsche 911 GT1. The Storm was therefore redesigned, with a longer and more aerodynamic front end added to the existing car. This car was referred to as the Storm GTL and also used a carbon fibre structure and body panels. The car debuted at the 24 Hours of Daytona, where it managed to take 19th place overall and fourth in its class. Later that year, for Le Mans, two new Storm GTLs were entered, but neither of them was able to finish, with both cars out of the race by lap 77. Later in the year, a Storm GTL would travel to the United States to participate in the final two rounds of the FIA GT Championship at Sebring and Laguna Seca. The car failed to finish both races. It did take one race win and one second place, both results at Donington Park, in the 1997 British GT Championship, however.

1998 saw the team again attempt Daytona, but again they suffered problems early on, and did not finish. Updates to the car meant that it failed scrutineering and was not allowed to take part in the 1998 24 Hours of Le Mans despite the team entering the event and turning up to pre-qualify. One bone of contention was the lack of a rear window in the refreshed design.

Also in 1998, the Lister Storm GTL finished fifth overall in the British GT Championship in the hands of Tiff Needell and Julian Bailey (with Anthony Reid subbing for Tiff at the Circuit de Spa-Francorchamps round). There were three Storm GTLs entered this season and between them they achieved two victories and seven podiums including winning the Silverstone Golden Jubilee Trophy race.

An updated version of the car – featuring a longer nose design – won the overall 1999 British GT Championship driven by Jamie Campbell-Walter and Julian Bailey, winning seven races that season. The championship result was contentious, with a furore surrounding changes to the rear aerodynamics of the Storm GTL. Multiple protests were launched against the car by the rival Blue Coral Porsche team and the championship results remained provisional until after the season had ended. This was futile, and the Lister was victorious.

Meanwhile, the Storm GT also won the GT2 category of the championship that same year. It became apparent that the GT1 rules were going to disappear and that Lister was very competitive in GT2, which was to become the leading class in 2000. Thus, the end of the GTL.

== Storm GT ==
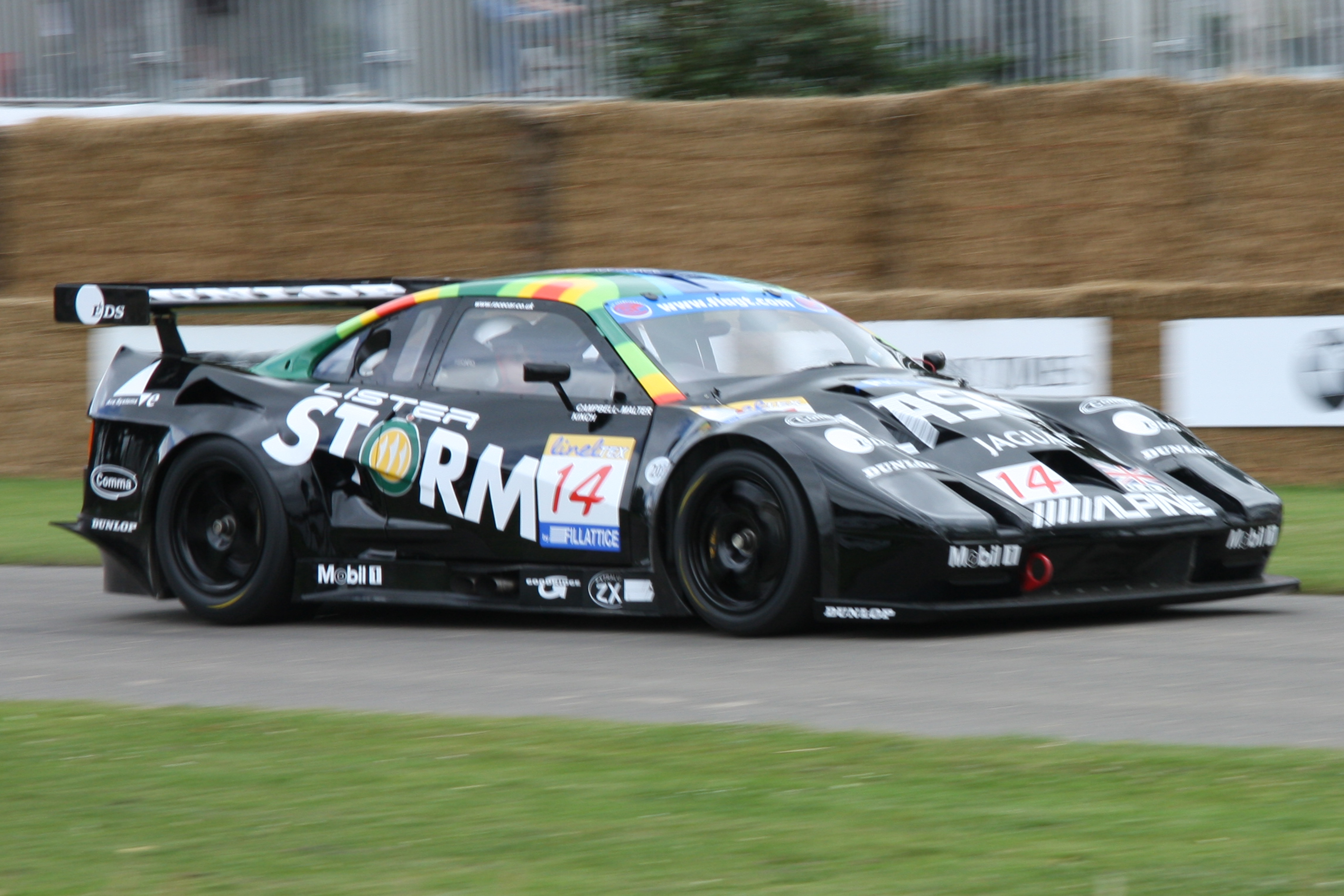
A Lister Storm GT, as driven by Jamie Campbell-Walter and Nathan Kinch in the 2003 FIA GT Championship

For 1999, the Storm reappeared, a reworked version of the earlier GTS. The car had lost the aerodynamic bodywork seen on the GTL, instead using a more stock front and rear ends. According to Malcolm Cracknell's book Taking the World by Storm, there was a shortage of new suitable GT machines at the time, so Lister was allowed to use the Storm despite road car production long since ceasing.

The team announced they would participate in the full FIA GT Championship season under the new GT2 class rules. After a poor start – retiring from fourth place in Monza and retiring from second place at Silverstone – the team managed to take fourth place at Hockenheimring, a mere two laps behind the winning pair of Chrysler Viper GTS-Rs. This was followed by pole position and third place at Zolder, and finally, a second place at Donington, with the Lister finishing 26 seconds behind the winning Viper. These successes brought Lister into a tie for fifth place overall in the teams championship at the season's end, despite only entering half the races. In the 1999 British GT Championship, David Warnock won the GT2 category for Cirtek Motorsport in a Lister Storm GT.

Going into 2000, Lister was more upbeat about their possibilities. Chrysler-Oreca had officially left the championship, eliminating a challenge from a factory team. Thus, Lister would face competition only from privateers. With this, Lister proved its capabilities by winning the first race of the season at Valencia. Lister would follow this up with four more wins during the season, all claimed by drivers Julian Bailey and Jamie Campbell-Walter. By round seven at the A1 Ring, the team was saddled with a new inlet restrictor to try to slow them down relative to its on-track rivals. With these victories, Lister claimed the team's and driver's championships with chassis number SA9STRM1BYB053119 GTM002 .

At the same time, Lister competed in the British GT championship both as a factory team, as well as with a customer car for Cirtek Motorsport. The two teams were able to take nine victories. David Warnock finished second overall in the championship using a Storm GT while Tiff Needell won the races at Circuit de Spa-Francorchamps and Silverstone in the Cirtek (CSi branded) Lister.

Returning as champions to FIA GT, Lister continued into 2001 with two factory cars. Although the Storm GT was very rapid and able to take four victories over the year, the team had to settle for third in the team's championship – beaten by Larbre Competition and Carsport Holland's Vipers. Jamie Campbell-Walter lead the charge, with Tom Coronel as teammate initially. Tom only did a part-season, however, and drivers Mike Jordan, Bobby Verdon-Roe and Richard Dean took it in turns to partner Campbell-Walter's championship efforts. The second car featured Julian Bailey alongside German businessman Nicolaus Springer. This was the last season Julian drove the Lister.

In terms of the 2001 British GT season, Lister won the championship with David Warnock and Mike Jordan at the wheel of a Storm GT, taking victory in no less than seven races. Lister also won the one and only ever race in the Interactive Sportscar Championship 2001 at Donington Park in the hands of James Pickford and David Warnock.

A similar situation occurred in 2002, with Lister managing three victories but only able to take second in the team's championship, again beaten by Larbre. The main challenge this season was relying on a Pro-Am driver strategy across the two cars, as opposed to a Pro-Pro driver line-up by most other teams. The cars were shared by Jamie Campbell-Walter alongside German businessman Nicolaus Springer in car 14 and Bobby Verdon-Roe and British businessman Paul Knapfield in car 15. At times, the amateur drivers would lose one minute to the leaders during their stints. Despite this, Campbell-Walter and Springer finished third overall in the driver's championship. From a British GT point of view, the Storm GT was once again driven by David Warnock and Mike Jordan. This combination delivered 3 race wins and 4 podiums, finishing second in the championship. A great season, but the writing was on the wall for the Lister as the new Saleen S7-R proved to be the dominant vehicle in its first season.

In 2003, Lister was joined in FIA GT with a customer Storm, run by Creation Autosportif. The Lister factory team managed only a single win, yet were still able to take second place in the teams' championship. Creation was not far behind, with a fourth-place finish in the championship, after gaining a second customer Storm. The outfit's season was blighted by bad luck and unfortunate incidents, as despite generally being outclassed by the Prodrive-made Ferrari 550s (a Ferrari would win every single race but one this season), an updated aerodynamic package would keep the Storm competitive and ahead of the Saleens and Vipers.

At the first race in Barcelona, Jamie Campbell-Walter claimed pole position, led the early stages, but then, when in second, a car in front drove over the front splitter from Force One Racing Festina's Viper, which was lying on the track. The part flew into the air, landing on the Lister, smashing its windscreen and roof. Campbell-Walter later said that he was nearly hit inside the cockpit by the debris. The car tried to continue without part of its roof, but was shown the black and orange flag and retired.

At the second round, Magny Cours, once again, Campbell-Walter and Nathan Kinch led, this time until four laps from the end, when a technical issue meant retirement. They were classified in 10th, four laps behind the winner, as it sat in pitlane. The second Storm of Andrea Piccini and Jean-Denis Délétraz finished third, despite suffering a puncture. That duo would claim a second at Brno, while Campbell-Walter and Kinch claimed second at Enna Pergusa.

That season's win at Anderstorp by Campbell-Walter and Kinch, with the second factory lister of Piccini and David Sterckx in third, was the last FIA win for the Storm. At Oschersleben, Campbell-Walter and Kinch would win again, only to be disqualified by dint of a late-race accident, where Campbell-Walter and Philippe Alliot, driving for Force One Racing Festina and one lap behind the leading Lister, collided on the start/finish straight, sending the Viper into the barriers. Bobby Verdon-Roe and Marco Zadra finished second, however, in the Creation Autosportif Storm. Campbell-Walter and Kinch would finish third at the Monza season finale, the final FIA GT podium for a Storm. The team also led that year's Spa 24 hours before retiring after a crash.

Meanwhile, in British GT 2003, a rule change for the season outlawed cars of the Storm's ilk and thus the team did not enter. At the same time, Lister began work on a new project, the Storm LMP which would bring the marque back to Le Mans.

For 2004, with the focus on the LMP project, Creation Autosportif would take over as the main competitor in FIA GT with an older specification Storm for a part-season. Jamie Campbell-Walter was paired with amateur Jamie Derbyshire, scoring three top-five finishes. Creation managed to take only eighth in the teams championship after the team decided to move to Le Mans Prototypes as well.

The factory squad only appeared at four races, scoring a single point all season. In the hands of Tom Coronel, the Storm GT could still fight up front. At the first round, Monza, the Dutch driver, qualified fifth, and in the race, moved up to fourth. It was challenging for third when a water hose disconnected, retiring the Storm. This was likely a legacy of an overnight rebuild, following a crash in free practice by Patrick Pearce. Sadly, at Valencia, ameatuer Paul Knapfield spun the Lister into retirement, at the Hockenheim ring it set on fire and at the Spa 24, the team entered an all-ameauter line-up, only to retire due the drivers' being exhausted.

Lister would continue to campaign the car into 2005, but was only able to gather enough points for 10th place in the team's championship. In the 2005 FFSA GT Championship, it remained competitive, entered by Red Racing. At the historic Pau circuit, drivers David Alexander and Gael Lesoudier qualified in second and won the opening race. It would also secure pole position at Dijon and a third place at that round's second race. Despite these promising results in the opening events, Red Racing was absent for the second half of the year. Creation Autosportif entered a Strorm into the season-ending Magny-Cours round.

Following 2005, the factory officially retired the cars to concentrate on the Storm LMP.

In 2006, both Red Racing and Creation Autosportif entered Storms in the FFSA GT Championship, but, collectively, they would only manage a handful of race entries. A high point, Création claimed a sixth-place finish during the Dijon round's second race. Also that year, Capuava Racing Team entered a Storm into the Mil Milhas endurance race at the Interlagos Circuit. Pedro Lamy qualified the car in ninth place, but the car did not start the race, with Lamy instead driving the team's Mercedes-Benz CLK DTM instead.

Red Racing, meanwhile, would make one attempt at the FIA GT Championship, but failed to make it beyond seven laps in the race at Paul Ricard.
