= Privilege (insurance company) =

UK insurance company

- Company type: Wholly owned subsidiary
- Industry: Financial services
- Founded: 1994
- Headquarters: Croydon, UK
- Products: Insurance
- Parent: Direct Line Group
- Website: www.privilege.com

Privilege is a division of the Direct Line Group founded in 1994 that specialises in selling insurance over the phone and internet.

Privilege insurance, based in Bromley, is underwritten by UK Insurance Limited and currently sells home insurance, car insurance and car breakdown cover.

Joanna Lumley, Ian Wright and Nigel Havers are celebrities who have all appeared in Privilege advertising campaigns, featuring the 'You don't have to be posh to be Privileged' slogan.
