= Jamie Campbell-Walter =

British racing driver (born 1972)

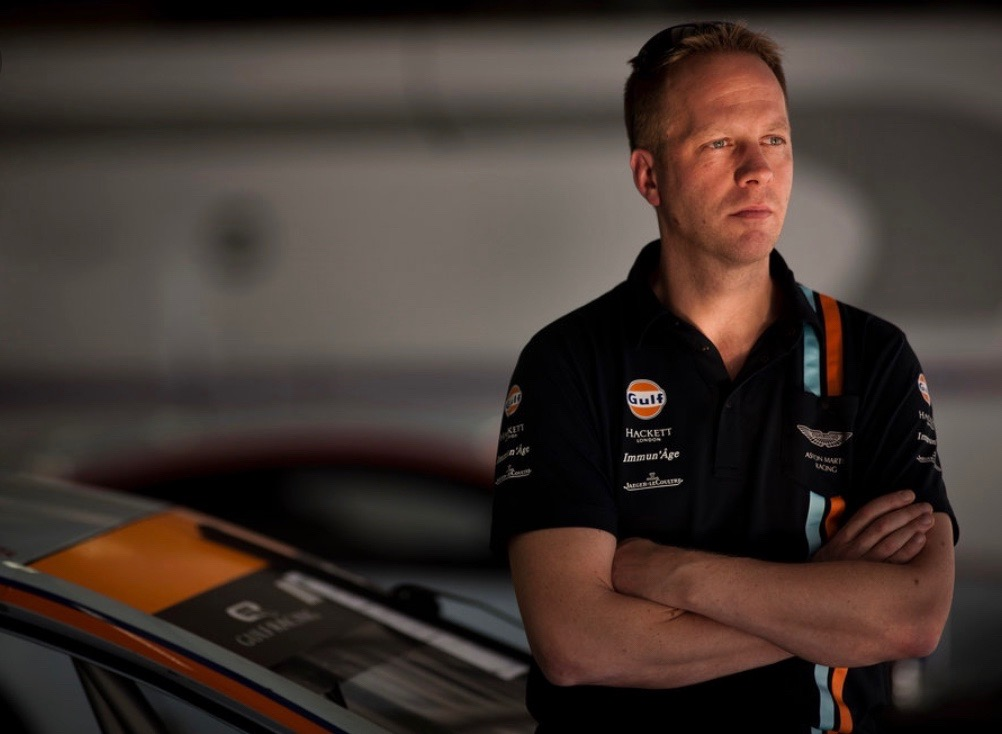
- Nationality: (United Kingdom) British
- Born: Jamie Oliver Campbell-Walter; 16 December 1972 (age 53) Oban, Scotland
- Categorisation: FIA Platinum (until 2018); FIA Gold (2019–2022); FIA Silver (2023–)

Championship titles
- 1999 2000 2013: British GT Championship; FIA GT Championship; FIA World Endurance Championship LMGTE Am

24 Hours of Le Mans career
- Years: 2005 – 2007, 2009, 2013
- Teams: Creation Autosportif, Aston Martin Racing
- Best finish: 14th (2005)
- Class wins: 0

Jamie Oliver Campbell-Walter (born 16 December 1972) is a British professional racing driver from Oban, Scotland. He won the FIA GT Championship in 2000 and took a World Endurance Championship title in 2013 as an Aston Martin Racing factory driver. He now owns and runs Bullet Sports Management with business partner and former team-mate Nicolas Minassian and María Catarineu.

== Family ==
Jamie Campbell-Walter is the son of Richard and Annie Campbell-Walter. His father, Richard, is the brother of famous model Fiona Campbell-Walter. He is the grandson of Rear Admiral Keith McNeil Campbell-Walter. Campbell-Walter is the cousin of art collector and philanthropist Francesca Thyssen-Bornemisza through his aunt. Campbell-Walter is the cousin once removed of Austrian racing driver Ferdinand Habsburg who is the son of Thyssen-Bornemisza.

== Early career ==
Like many young drivers, Campbell-Walter started racing in single seaters. He made his debut in the Formula Vauxhall Junior Winter Series in 1993, taking second place in the championship, followed by a third place in the British national championship in 1994. Campbell-Walter moved to the higher Formula Vauxhall series in 1995 where he was fifth in the championship, which he hoped would propel him into the British Formula 3 Championship the following year. However, even though he did perform one test in a British Formula 3 car, he was unable to find the funding necessary and did only five races for James Crofts Racing in the 1996 TVR Tuscan Challenge.

== National and international GT racing ==
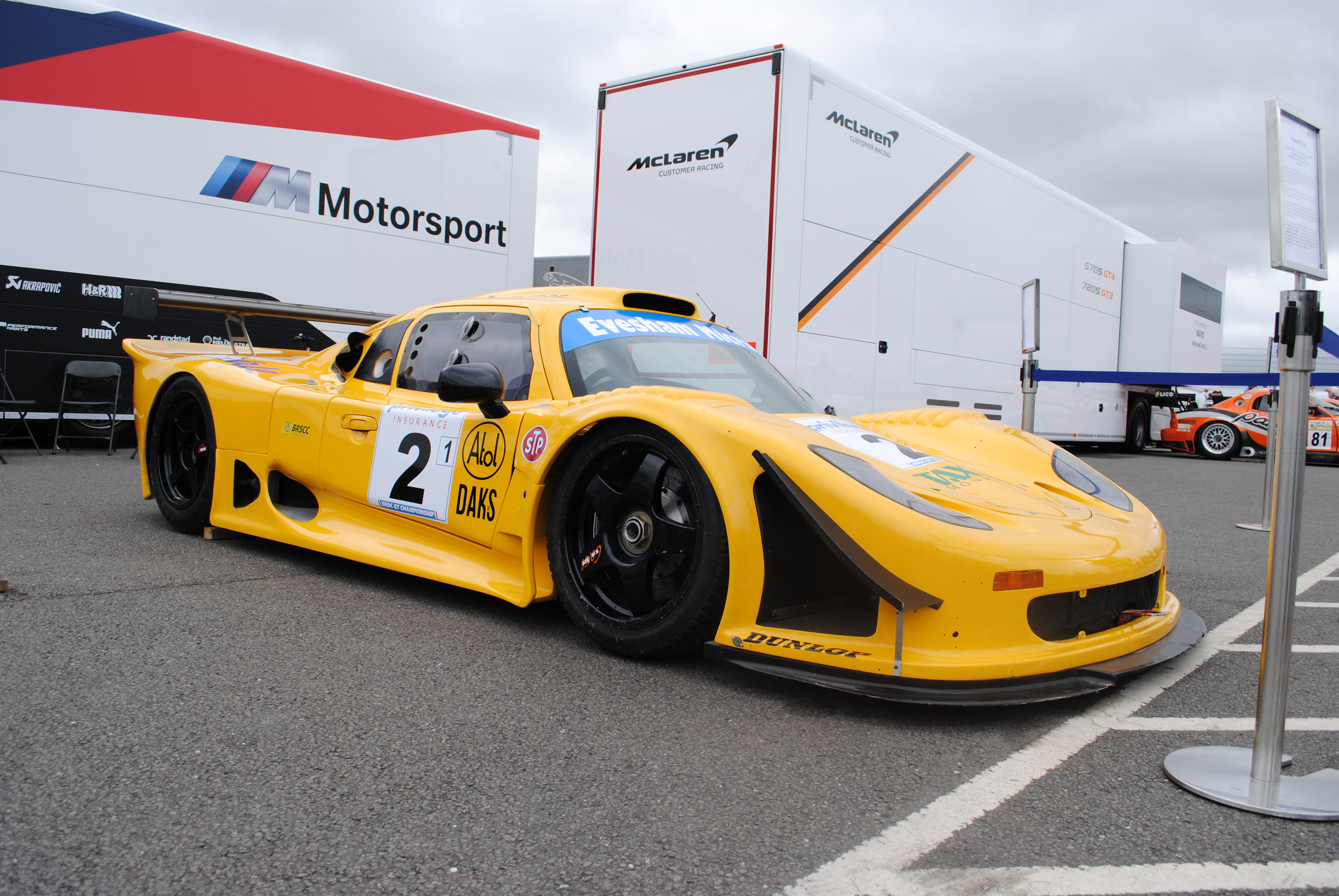
Campbell-Walter's Harrier from the 1998 British GT Championship.

In 1997, Campbell-Walter returned to racing, taking a drive in the TVR Tuscan Challenge, a one-make trophy organised by the British manufacturer. He took fourth place in the series championship after winning two rounds for Colin Blower Motorsport. Blower, who was in charge of development for the TVR Cerbera's motorsport program, invited Campbell-Walter to co-drive with him in the racing Cerbera in selected rounds of the British GT Championship. The pair won the Donington Park round before the both of them made their debut in the FIA GT Championship at the 4 Hours of Donington Park, retiring after 38 minutes.

The following year, Campbell-Walter stayed with Colin Blower for the TVR Tuscan Challenge, where he took five wins but was only able to finish fourth in the drivers championship once more. In the British GT Championship, he moved to the Harrier team, finishing 21st in the overall classification and tenth in the GT1 class.

A move to Lister Racing in 1999 saw Campbell-Walter take his first ever drivers championship, winning the British GT title driving alongside Julian Bailey in the Lister Storm GT1. The pair took seven wins in eleven rounds, including the Oulton Park Gold Cup, and lead the Blue Coral G-Force Porsche 911 GT1 driving line-up of Magnus Wallinder and Geoff Lister by 20 points, securing the championship before the season was even over.

Having taken part in selected rounds of the FIA GT Championship in the previous season, Lister Racing made a full force assault on the international series in 2000, retaining the line-up of Campbell-Walter and Bailey. The duo were once again successful, taking the GT1 title with 59 points after five wins in ten races. Campbell-Walter also won the two rounds of the British Championship he took part in, alongside David Warnock, and won six events with a partial season in the TVR Tuscan Challenge. At the end of the season, Campbell-Walter was awarded the John Cobb Memorial Trophy for most outstanding performance by a British driver in international competition.

For the following three seasons, Campbell-Walter remained at Lister Racing, taking another seven wins, and finishing fifth (2001), third (2002) and sixth (2003) in the drivers championship. Over those years, he was partnered by Tom Coronel, Nicolaus Springer and Nathan Kinch. In 2002, it was awarded by Autosport Magazine Best international GT driver.

In 2004, Lister reduced its commitments to GT racing and Campbell-Walter moved to privateer Creation Autosportif. However, Creation's Lister was not as competitive as the works car had been on previous years, and Campbell-Walter, driving alongside partner Jamie Derbyshire scored no podium position and finished the championship in 13th place. In 2005, he made a lone appearance in FIA GT to drive in the Spa 24 Hours for Russian Age Racing, taking the wheel of a Ferrari 550 Maranello.

In 2006, Campbell-Walter also drove for the Red Bull BMW team in the Silverstone 24 hours race and won the race, his first 24-hour victory.

In 2007, Campbell-Walter once again won the Silverstone 24-hour race in the Red Bull BMW team and also won the Dubai 24 hours race with the same team and car.

For 2010 & 2011, Campbell-Walter joined the Sumo Power GT Team driving the infamous Nissan GTR in the FIA GT1 World Championship. The first was a huge success for such a new car and Campbell-Walter was teamed up with Warren Hughes. For 2011, Campbell-Walter stayed with the team and was joined by David Brabham, the youngest son of three-time Formula One World Champion Sir Jack Brabham.

For 2012, Campbell-Walter drove for Gulf Racing in a Mclaren MP4-12C with Stuart Hall and Roald Goethe. They contested the Blancpain Endurance series including the famous Spa 24 hour race.

For 2013, Campbell-Walter was signed up by Aston Martin as a factory driver. He contested the FIA World Endurance Championship in an Aston Martin V8 Vantage GTE. He won two races and finished on the podium four times going on to win the championship. This included a fourth-place finish at Le Mans 24hrs.

== Le Mans and prototype racing ==
Following their years in FIA GT, Creation Autosportif bought its own prototype program, having acquired the Reynard-built DBA 03S from RN Motorsport, later becoming known as the Creation CA06/H. Campbell-Walter was partnered with Nicolas Minassian for the 2004 Le Mans Endurance Series, taking two pole-positions and podium positions at Nurburgring and Spa.

In 2005, the team's fortunes improved and Campbell-Walter and Minassian (occasionally partnered also by Jean-Denis Délétraz) achieved a second place at Silverstone, a third place at Spa, and another third at Istanbul. Campbell-Walter also made his competition debut at the 24 Hours of Le Mans, following a failed attempt in 2003, where his Lister Storm LMP was crashed in qualifying. The Creation team took fourteenth place overall and seventh in class, with Campbell-Walter driving alongside Minassian and Andy Wallace.

For the 2006 season, while Creation expanded to two cars later in the season, Campbell-Walter was forced to drive an Aston Martin DBR9 on occasion for Cirtek Motorsport. Once reunited with Creation, he drove alongside Felipe Ortiz and Beppe Gabbiani to take third place at Donington. He also ran at Le Mans with Ortiz and Gabbiani, but retired three hours before the finish with engine failure.

For 2007, he was once more a driver for Creation Autosportif, driving alongside Shinji Nakano and Felipe Ortiz, taking the first points for the Creation CA07 at Nurburgring. Campbell-Walter achieved one podium in Interlagos, Brazil. Then contributed to getting the team's second and third podiums of the year at Laguna Seca and Petit Le Mans.(USA)

In 2008, Campbell-Walter suffered an accident at Monza, breaking four vertebra in his back, he escaped death after having a wishbone fail at 195 mph. Campbell-Walter returned to a race car within 7 months.

In 2009, Campbell-Walter competed at Le Mans 24hrs and finished 14th in class with Vanina Ickx.

In 2013, Campbell-Walter competed at Le Mans 24hrs and finished fourth in class at the wheel of a factory Aston Martin V8 Vantage.

== Outside racing ==
In 2010, Campbell-Walter was the official Formula One driver for the Yas Marina Circuit in Abu Dhabi. He drove the ex Minardi two-seater Formula One car for promotional purposes and for paying clients.

In 2019, Campbell-Walter founded a management company together with his former team-mate Nicolas Minassian and María Catarineu, Bullet Sports Management, which represents drivers including FIA WEC and ELMS driver Ferdinand Habsburg, Alpine F1 Team driver Franco Colapinto and FIA F3 driver Oliver Goethe, GT World Challenge Europe drivers Benjamin Goethe and FIA WEC driver Rui Andrade.

== Racing record ==
Season	Series	Team	Races	Wins	Poles	F/laps	Podiums	Points	Position
1993	Formula Vauxhall Junior Winter Series								1st
1994	Formula Vauxhall Junior Series	David Leslie Racing	9	1	1		3	77	3rd
1994	Formula Vauxhall Lotus Winter Series								
1995	Formula Vauxhall Lotus	PTM Motorsport		1			1	48	5th
1996	TVR Tuscan Championship								
1997	TVR Tuscan Championship	Colin Blower Motorsport		3				564	4th
1997	British GT Championship	Harrogate Horseless Carriages	3	1	2	1	1		NC
1998	British GT Championship	Harrier Cars with Evesham Micros	9				1	40	9th
1998	TVR Tuscan Championship	Colin Blower Motorsport	15	5	2	2	8		4th
1999	British GT Championship	Newcastle United Lister Storm	11	7	2	1	9	177	1st
1999	TVR Tuscan Championship	Colin Blower Motorsport		6	4				
1999	FIA GT Championship	Lister Storm Racing	2						NC
2000	FIA GT Championship	Lister Storm Racing	10	5	6		8	59	1st
2000	British GT Championship	Cirtek Motorsport	4	2	3				2nd
2000	TVR Tuscan Championship	Colin Blower Motorsport	9	7	5	8			
2000	1000 km Suzuka	Lister Storm Racing	1		1				
2001	FIA GT Championship	Lister Storm Racing	10	3	1	5	4	39	3rd
2002	FIA GT Championship	Lister Storm Racing	10	3	7	4	5	46.5	3rd
2002	Mil Milhas Brasil	Lister Storm Racing	1		1	1			
2003	FIA GT Championship	Lister Storm Racing	10	1	1	1	3	32	6th
2003	American Le Mans Series	Lister Storm Racing	1						NC
2003	24 Hours of Le Mans	Lister Storm Racing	1						DNS
2003	Le Mans 1000 Kilometres	Lister Storm Racing	1						6th
2004	Le Mans Endurance Series	Creation Autosportif	4		2		2	12	4th
2004	FIA GT Championship	Lister Storm Racing							
2004	American Le Mans Series	Creation Autosportif							
2005	Le Mans Endurance Series	Creation Autosportif	5					24	5th
2005	24 Hours of Le Mans	Creation Autosportif	1						7th
2006	Le Mans Endurance Series	Cirtek Motorsport	1						8th
2006	Le Mans Endurance Series	Creation Autosportif	1				1		7th
2006	24 Hours of Le Mans	Creation Autosportif	1						DNF
2006	American Le Mans Series	Creation Autosportif	2		1		1	38	NC
2006	Silverstone 24H	Duller Motorsport	1	1	1	1	1		1st
2007	24 Hours of Le Mans	Creation Autosportif	1						DNF
2008									
2009	24 Hours of Le Mans	Creation Autosportif	1						15th
2010	FIA GT1 World Championship	Sumo Power GT	20	1			3	52	16th
2011	FIA GT1 World Championship	Sumo Power GT	20				4	75	10th
2012	Blancpain Endurance Series	Gulf Racing							
2012	Australian V8 SuperCars	Brad Jones Racing	2						NC
2013	FIA World Endurance Championship	Aston Martin Racing	8	2	1	1	4	129	1st
2013	Blancpain Endurance Series	Aston Martin Racing	1						NC
2013	24 Hours of Le Mans	Aston Martin Racing	1						6th
2014	Classic Endurance Championship	Knapfield Racing	4		1	2	3	42	4th
2015	24H Series	Gulf Racing	1						NC
2016	24H Series	RAM Racing	1				1		NC
2017	24H Series	Rofgo Racing	2						NC
2018	International GT Open	Drivex	2						NC

=== Complete British GT Championship results ===
(key) (Races in bold indicate pole position) (Races in italics indicate fastest lap)

Year	Team	Car	Class	1	2	3	4	5	6	7	8	9	10	11	12	Pos	Points
1998	Harrier Cars with Evesham Micros	Harrier GT1-98	GT1	SIL; 1; 12	OUL; 1 Ret	CRO; 1; 5	SNE; 1; 9	SIL; 2 Ret	DON; 1; 5	SIL; 2; 5	SPA; 1 DNS	SIL; 3 Ret				9th	40
1999	Newcastle United Lister Storm	Lister Storm	GT	SIL; 1; 3	OUL; 1; 1	SNE; 1; 1	BRH; 1; 1	SIL; 2; 2	DON; 1; 1	**DON**; **2**; 1	SIL; 2; 4	CRO; 1; 1	SPA; 1; 1	SPA; 1 Ret	**SIL**; **1** Ret	1st	177
2000	Cirtek Motorsport	Lister Storm	GT	THR; 1	CRO; 1	OUL; 1	DON; 1	**SIL**; **1**; 11†	BRH; 1; 1	DON; 1	CRO; 1	**SIL**; **1**; 1	SNE; 1	SPA; 1 Ret	SIL; 1	16th	33

=== Complete FIA GT results ===
Year	Entrant	Car	1	2	3	4	5	6	7	8	9	10	11	DC	Points
1999	Lister Racing	Lister Storm GT2	MON	SIL	HOC; 4	HUN	ZOL; 12	OSC	DON	HOM	WAT	ZHU		26th	3
2000	Lister Racing	Lister Storm GTM	**VAL**; 1	**EST**; 1	MON; 3	**SIL**; 1	HUN; Ret	ZOL; 1	A1R; Ret	LAU; 3	**BRN**; 2	MAG; 1		**1st**	**59**
2001	Lister Racing	Lister Storm GTM	MON; 1	BRN; 4	MAG; 1	SIL; Ret	ZOL; DSQ	HUN; Ret	SPA	A1R; Ret	NÜR; 1	JAR; Ret	EST; 2	3rd	39
2002	Lister Racing	Lister Storm GTM	**MAG**; 1	**SIL**; 4	BRN; 1	JAR; 6	**AND**; Ret	**OSC**; 2	SPA; DSQ	PER; 1	DON; 7	EST; 3		3rd	46.5
2003	Lister Racing	Lister Storm GTM	**CAT**; Ret	MAG; 6	PER; 2	BRN; 4	DON; Ret	**SPA**; Ret	AND; 1	OSC; DSQ	EST; Ret	MON; 3		6th	32

=== Complete FIA World Endurance Championship results ===
Year	Entrant	Class	Car	Engine	1	2	3	4	5	6	7	8	Rank	Points
2013	Aston Martin Racing	LMGTE Am	Aston Martin Vantage GTE	Aston Martin 4.5 L V8	**SIL**; 4	SPA; 4	LMS; 5	SÃO; 1	COA; 1	FUJ; 2	SHA; 3	BHR; 5	1st	129

=== Complete Le Mans Endurance Series results ===
Year	Entrant	Class	Car	Engine	1	2	3	4	5	Rank	Points
2004	Creation Autosportif	LMP1	DBA 03S	Zytek ZG348 3.4L V8	MON ovr:Ret cls:Ret	**NÜR** **ovr:3** **cls:3**	SIL ovr:Ret cls:Ret	**SPA** **ovr:3** **cls:3**		4th	12
2005	Creation Autosportif	LMP1	DBA 03S	Judd GV5 5.0L V10	SPA ovr:Ret cls:Ret	MON ovr:7 cls:5	**SIL** **ovr:2** **cls:2**	**NÜR** **ovr:3** **cls:3**	IST ovr:3 cls:3	5th	25
2006	Cirtek Motorsport	GT1	Aston Martin DBR9	**Aston Martin 6.0L V12**	IST	SPA	NÜR	DON	JAR ovr:4 cls:4	8th	9
2006	Creation Autosportif	LMP1	Creation CA06/H Judd	**Judd GV5 5.0L V10**	IST	SPA	NÜR	DON ovr:2 cls:2	JAR	7th	8
2007											

=== 24 Hours of Le Mans results ===
Year	Team	Co-drivers	Car	Class	Laps	Pos.	Class pos.
2005	(United Kingdom) Creation Autosportif Ltd.	(France) Nicolas Minassian (United Kingdom) Andy Wallace	DBA 03S-Judd	LMP1	322	14th	7th
2006	(United Kingdom) Creation Autosportif Ltd.	(Switzerland) Felipe Ortiz (Italy) Giuseppe Gabbiani	Creation CA06/H-Judd	LMP1	240	DNF	DNF
2007	(United Kingdom) Creation Autosportif Ltd.	(Japan) Shinji Nakano (Switzerland) Felipe Ortiz	Creation CA07-Judd	LMP1	55	DNF	DNF
2009	(United Kingdom) Creation Autosportif	(Belgium) Vanina Ickx (France) Romain Ianetta	Creation CA07-Judd	LMP1	319	24th	15th
2013	(United Kingdom) Aston Martin Racing	(Germany) Roald Goethe (United Kingdom) Stuart Hall	Aston Martin Vantage GTE	LMGTE Am	301	30th	6th

=== Britcar 24 Hour results ===
Year	Team	Co-drivers	Car	Car No.	Class	Laps	Pos.	Class pos.	Ref
2007	(Austria) Duller Motorsport	(Austria) Dieter Quester (Austria) Johannes Stuck (Germany) Dirk Werner	BMW Z4 M Coupé	1	GT3	596	**1st**	**1st**	

=== Complete GT1 World Championship results ===
Year	Team	Car	1	2	3	4	5	6	7	8	9	10	11	12	13	14	15	16	17	18	19	20	Pos	Points	Ref
2010	Sumo Power GT	Nissan	ABU; QR; 13	ABU; CR; 12	SIL; QR; 5	SIL; CR; 1	BRN; QR; 21	BRN; CR; 17	PRI; QR; 3	PRI; CR; 8	SPA; QR; 19	SPA; CR; 11	NÜR; QR; 16	NÜR; CR; 8	ALG; QR; 9	ALG; CR; Ret	NAV; QR; 5	NAV; CR; 3	INT; QR; 14	INT; CR; Ret	SAN; QR; 13	SAN; CR; 16	16th	52	
2011	Sumo Power GT	Nissan	ABU; QR; 8	ABU; CR; 9	ZOL; QR; 11	ZOL; CR; Ret	ALG; QR; 3	ALG; CR; 3	SAC; QR; 8	SAC; CR; 5	SIL; QR; Ret	SIL; CR; Ret	NAV; QR; 4	NAV; CR; 3	PRI; QR; 9	PRI; CR; 4	ORD; QR; 3	ORD; CR; 7	BEI; QR; 11	BEI; CR; 8	SAN; QR; 7	SAN; CR; Ret	10th	75	

=== Touring Car racing ===
==== V8 Supercar results ====
Year	Team	Car	1	2	3	4	5	6	7	8	9	10	11	12	13	14	15	16	17	18	19	20	21	22	23	24	25	26	27	28	29	30	31	Final pos	Points	Ref
2012	Britek Motorsport	Holden Commodore (VE)	ADE; R1	ADE; R2	SYM; R3	SYM; R4	HAM; R5	HAM; R6	PER; R7	PER; R8	PER; R9	PHI R10	PHI; R11	HDV R12	HDV; R13	TOW; R14	TOW; R15	QLD; R16	QLD; R17	SMP; R18	SMP; R19	SAN; Q	SAN; R20	BAT; R21	SUR; R22; 15	SUR; R23; 15	YMC; R24	YMC; R25	YMC; R26	WIN; R27	WIN; R28	SYD; R29	SYD; R30	NC	0 †	

† Not Eligible for points

Sporting positions
Preceded by Steve O'Rourke; Tim Sugden	British GT Champion; 1999 with: Julian Bailey	Succeeded by Calum Lockie
Preceded by Karl Wendlinger; Olivier Beretta	FIA GT Champion; 2000 with: Julian Bailey	Succeeded by Christophe Bouchut; Jean-Philippe Belloc
Preceded by none	FIA Endurance Trophy for LMGTE Drivers; 2013 with: Stuart Hall	Succeeded by Kristian Poulsen; David Heinemeier Hansson
