= Quaife =

British manufacturing company

- Industry: Automotive Powertrain Manufacturing
- Founded: 1965; 61 years ago
- Founder: Rod Quaife
- Headquarters: Sevenoaks, Kent, United Kingdom
- Website: www.quaife.co.uk

R.T. Quaife Engineering, Ltd. is a British manufacturer of automotive drivetrain products. It designs and manufactures motorsport and performance orientated gearboxes, gearkits, differentials, steering racks and axle kits, along with many other associated drivetrain products.

The company was founded in 1965, by Rod Quaife and is now run and owned by Sharon Quaife-Hobbs. Sharon's son Adrian Quaife-Hobbs is the owner of Pro-Sim and is a professional racing driver.

The early days at Quaife were spent manufacturing performance motorcycle gearkits, most notably close ratio 5-speed units for Triumph, BSA and Norton. Quaife also took on subcontracted work from AMC; the makers of Matchless and AJS motorcycles. Quaife gearkits were used to achieve victories in the Daytona Speedway and Isle of Man TT.

Based near Sevenoaks, Kent they have two sites, one in Sevenoaks and the other, their OEM production facility, in Gillingham.

Quaife's signature product is its line of automatic torque biasing differentials, a form of limited-slip differential that employ helical gears rather than clutch mechanisms that are controlled mechanically. These differentials are usually available as aftermarket items, but for some models are specified by automobile manufacturers as OEM equipment. Quaife's ATB differential is now available in over 300 different applications, covering everything from Alfa Romeo to Volvo. Originally developed in the 1980s, the ATB differential appeals to many performance and racing car enthusiasts for its mix of traction-enhancing abilities, reliability, smooth operation and its 'fit and forget' installation. Within many markets, the Quaife ATB differential also comes with a lifetime warranty; applicable to both road and race environments.

In addition to manufacturing engineered differentials, Quaife produces sequential gearboxes for motorsport and other automotive applications. Its QBE60G and QBE69G are six-speed sequential gearboxes available with different bell housings for various racing applications. The company also produces sequential transmissions for vehicles and applications including the Ford GT40, Land Rover V8, Mitsubishi Lancer Evolution IV–IX, Nissan Skyline GT-R R32–R34, and Porsche 996 and 997. Quaife also manufactures transmissions using synchromesh and dog-engagement mechanisms.

Quaife's range of motorsport gearkits replace the standard internals of many popular transmissions found in both classic and contemporary vehicles. Initially the company focused on classic British cars as well as those manufactured by Ford Motor Company. Over recent years, the company has expanded its gearkit offering by catering for many front-wheel drive vehicles including Honda K-Series, Volkswagen 02M/02Q and a number of Ford applications.

Elsewhere, Quaife driveline components can be found in a wide range of vehicles, including those from Radical Sportscars, Caterham, Ginetta, Morgan Motor Company and Donkervoort. Quaife sequential transmissions help to power Mini JCW Challenge race cars, while the Ligier JS P4 manufactured by Onroak Automotive uses Quaife sequential technology.

Quaife has also briefly built complete road cars, with the R4 GTS in 1999 which also competed in the British GT Championship. The company has also produced a roadster which was known as the R40.

Quaife continues to manufacture and supply ATB differentials for Ford Motor Company, for the Fiesta ST, Puma ST and Transit Custom, and Lotus Cars, for the Evora.

With electric vehicles becoming more and more prominent, Quaife has developed ATB differentials for the Tesla Model S and Model 3, and is looking to further expand the range of EV drivetrain products as the move to electric propulsion progresses.

== Applications ==
- The 1988 - 1992 Maserati Biturbo / Racing (Tipo 331) used a Quaife designed differential, commonly referred to as the 'Ranger' differential.
- The 1992 - 1998 Maserati Ghibli (AM336) followed its predecessor by using the Quaife 'Ranger' differential.
- The 2002 Ford Focus RS was fitted as standard with a Quaife automatic torque biasing (ATB) helical-gear limited-slip differential (LSD).
- The 2004-2007 Saturn Ion Redline features an optional Quaife ATB limited-slip differential.
- The 2004 Dodge SRT-4 was updated with a torque-sensing Quaife limited-slip differential.
- The 2006-2010 Chevrolet Cobalt SS w/G85 option features an optional Quaife ATB limited-slip differential and revised suspension geometry to reduce torque steer.
- In 2008 Ford announced that the Mk2 Ford Focus RS would include a Quaife ATB LSD.
- In 2012 the Dodge Caliber SRT4 was offered an aftermarket Quaife ATB helical gear limited-slip differential upgrade via RealTune.
- Starting in 2015, the Lotus Evora 400 was fitted with the Quaife ATB differential.
- The 2016 limited-run Mini John Cooper Works Challenge was equipped with a Quaife ATB Differential.
- From 2017, versions of the Mk3 Ford Focus RS featured the Quaife ATB differential, including RS, Race Red and Heritage Editions.
- The 2018 Ford Fiesta ST was available with a Quaife ATB limited-slip differential as a factory fit option, as part of the Performance Pack.
