= 2000 FIA GT A1-Ring 500km =

Motor race

Layout of the A1-Ring (1996-2003)

The 2000 FIA GT A1-Ring 500 km was the seventh round the 2000 FIA GT Championship season. It took place at the A1-Ring, Austria, on August 6, 2000.

== Official results ==
Class winners in bold. Cars failing to complete 70% of winner's distance marked as Not Classified (NC).

Pos	Class	No	Team	Drivers	Chassis	Tyre	Laps
Pos	Class	No	Team	Drivers	Engine	Tyre	Laps
1	**GT**	**25**	**(Netherlands) Carsport Holland**	**(Netherlands) Mike Hezemans (Netherlands) Tom Coronel**	**Chrysler Viper GTS-R**	**MI**	**113**
1	**GT**	**25**	**(Netherlands) Carsport Holland**	**(Netherlands) Mike Hezemans (Netherlands) Tom Coronel**	**Chrysler 8.0L V10**	**MI**	**113**
2	GT	12	(France) Paul Belmondo Racing	(France) Boris Derichebourg (France) Emmanuel Clérico	Chrysler Viper GTS-R	**D**	113
2	GT	12	(France) Paul Belmondo Racing	(France) Boris Derichebourg (France) Emmanuel Clérico	Chrysler 8.0L V10	**D**	113
3	GT	3	(Germany) Freisinger Motorsport	(Austria) Gottfried Armin Grasser (Germany) Wolfgang Kaufmann	Porsche 911 GT2	**D**	112
3	GT	3	(Germany) Freisinger Motorsport	(Austria) Gottfried Armin Grasser (Germany) Wolfgang Kaufmann	Porsche 3.8L Turbo Flat-6	**D**	112
4	GT	11	(France) Paul Belmondo Racing	(France) Paul Belmondo (France) Claude-Yves Gosselin	Chrysler Viper GTS-R	**D**	112
4	GT	11	(France) Paul Belmondo Racing	(France) Paul Belmondo (France) Claude-Yves Gosselin	Chrysler 8.0L V10	**D**	112
5	GT	5	(Germany) Konrad Motorsport	(Austria) Franz Konrad (Germany) Jürgen von Gartzen	Porsche 911 GT2	**D**	112
5	GT	5	(Germany) Konrad Motorsport	(Austria) Franz Konrad (Germany) Jürgen von Gartzen	Porsche 3.8L Turbo Flat-6	**D**	112
6	GT	22	(Germany) Wieth Racing	(Germany) Niko Wieth (Germany) Franz Wieth	Porsche 911 GT2	**D**	109
6	GT	22	(Germany) Wieth Racing	(Germany) Niko Wieth (Germany) Franz Wieth	Porsche 3.8L Turbo Flat-6	**D**	109
7	GT	1	(United Kingdom) Chamberlain Motorsport	(Austria) Horst Felbermayr, Sr. (Austria) Horst Felbermayr, Jr.	Chrysler Viper GTS-R	**MI**	109
7	GT	1	(United Kingdom) Chamberlain Motorsport	(Austria) Horst Felbermayr, Sr. (Austria) Horst Felbermayr, Jr.	Chrysler 8.0L V10	**MI**	109
8	**N-GT**	**57**	**(Italy) ART Engineering**	**(Italy) Fabio Mancini (Italy) Gianni Collini**	**Porsche 911 GT3-R**	**P**	**107**
8	**N-GT**	**57**	**(Italy) ART Engineering**	**(Italy) Fabio Mancini (Italy) Gianni Collini**	**Porsche 3.6L Flat-6**	**P**	**107**
9	N-GT	56	(United Kingdom) EMKA GTC	(United Kingdom) Steve O'Rourke (United Kingdom) Tim Sugden	Porsche 911 GT3-R	**P**	107
9	N-GT	56	(United Kingdom) EMKA GTC	(United Kingdom) Steve O'Rourke (United Kingdom) Tim Sugden	Porsche 3.6L Flat-6	**P**	107
10	GT	27	(Italy) Autorlando	(Italy) Marco Spinelli (Italy) Gabriele Sabatini (Austria) Manfred Jurasz	Porsche 911 GT2	**P**	105
10	GT	27	(Italy) Autorlando	(Italy) Marco Spinelli (Italy) Gabriele Sabatini (Austria) Manfred Jurasz	Porsche 3.8L Turbo Flat-6	**P**	105
11	N-GT	79	(Germany) RWS Red Bull Racing	(Germany) Günther Blieninger (Austria) Hans-Jörg Hofer (Belgium) Hans Willems	Porsche 911 GT3-R	**MI**	104
11	N-GT	79	(Germany) RWS Red Bull Racing	(Germany) Günther Blieninger (Austria) Hans-Jörg Hofer (Belgium) Hans Willems	Porsche 3.6L Flat-6	**MI**	104
12	N-GT	53	(France) Larbre Compétition Chéreau	(France) Ferdinand de Lesseps (Germany) André Ahrlé	Porsche 911 GT3-R	**MI**	103
12	N-GT	53	(France) Larbre Compétition Chéreau	(France) Ferdinand de Lesseps (Germany) André Ahrlé	Porsche 3.6L Flat-6	**MI**	103
13	N-GT	66	(Italy) MAC Racing	(Switzerland) Renato Bicciato (Italy) Massimo Frigerio (Belgium) Michel Neugarten	Porsche 911 GT3-R	**D**	102
13	N-GT	66	(Italy) MAC Racing	(Switzerland) Renato Bicciato (Italy) Massimo Frigerio (Belgium) Michel Neugarten	Porsche 3.6L Flat-6	**D**	102
14	N-GT	52	(France) Larbre Compétition Chéreau	(France) Christophe Bouchut (France) Patrice Goueslard	Porsche 911 GT3-R	**MI**	98
14	N-GT	52	(France) Larbre Compétition Chéreau	(France) Christophe Bouchut (France) Patrice Goueslard	Porsche 3.6L Flat-6	**MI**	98
15 DNF	N-GT	77	(Germany) RWS Red Bull Racing	(Italy) Luca Riccitelli (Austria) Dieter Quester	Porsche 911 GT3-R	**MI**	90
15 DNF	N-GT	77	(Germany) RWS Red Bull Racing	(Italy) Luca Riccitelli (Austria) Dieter Quester	Porsche 3.6L Flat-6	**MI**	90
16 DNF	N-GT	55	(Italy) ART Engineering	(Italy) Constantino Bertuzzi (Italy) Pierangelo Masselli	Porsche 911 GT3-R	**P**	78
16 DNF	N-GT	55	(Italy) ART Engineering	(Italy) Constantino Bertuzzi (Italy) Pierangelo Masselli	Porsche 3.6L Flat-6	**P**	78
17 DNF	GT	7	(Germany) Proton Competition	(Germany) Gerold Ried (Germany) Christian Ried	Porsche 911 GT2	**Y**	68
17 DNF	GT	7	(Germany) Proton Competition	(Germany) Gerold Ried (Germany) Christian Ried	Porsche 3.6L Turbo Flat-6	**Y**	68
18 DNF	GT	14	(United Kingdom) Lister Storm Racing	(United Kingdom) Jamie Campbell-Walter (United Kingdom) Julian Bailey	Lister Storm	**MI**	62
18 DNF	GT	14	(United Kingdom) Lister Storm Racing	(United Kingdom) Jamie Campbell-Walter (United Kingdom) Julian Bailey	Jaguar 7.0L V12	**MI**	62
19 DNF	GT	15	(United Kingdom) Lister Storm Racing	(Germany) Nicolaus Springer (Switzerland) Philippe Favre	Lister Storm	**MI**	58
19 DNF	GT	15	(United Kingdom) Lister Storm Racing	(Germany) Nicolaus Springer (Switzerland) Philippe Favre	Jaguar 7.0L V12	**MI**	58
20 DNF	GT	4	(Germany) Freisinger Motorsport	(Germany) Ernst Palmberger (Japan) Yukihiro Hane	Porsche 911 GT2	**D**	51
20 DNF	GT	4	(Germany) Freisinger Motorsport	(Germany) Ernst Palmberger (Japan) Yukihiro Hane	Porsche 3.8L Turbo Flat-6	**D**	51
21 DNF	GT	29	(France) MMI	(France) Jean-Pierre Jarier (France) François Lafon	Chrysler Viper GTS-R	?	47
21 DNF	GT	29	(France) MMI	(France) Jean-Pierre Jarier (France) François Lafon	Chrysler 8.0L V10	?	47
22 DNF	N-GT	50	(United Kingdom) Pennzoil Quaker State G-Force	(United Kingdom) Nigel Smith (Sweden) Magnus Wallinder	Porsche 911 GT3-R	**D**	36
22 DNF	N-GT	50	(United Kingdom) Pennzoil Quaker State G-Force	(United Kingdom) Nigel Smith (Sweden) Magnus Wallinder	Porsche 3.6L Flat-6	**D**	36
23 DNF	N-GT	51	(United Kingdom) Pennzoil Quaker State G-Force	(United Kingdom) Richard Nearn (France) Stéphane Ortelli	Porsche 911 GT3-R	**D**	32
23 DNF	N-GT	51	(United Kingdom) Pennzoil Quaker State G-Force	(United Kingdom) Richard Nearn (France) Stéphane Ortelli	Porsche 3.6L Flat-6	**D**	32
24 DNF	GT	24	(Germany) MRT Lamborghini	(Germany) Michael Trunk (Germany) Bernhard Müller	Lamborghini Diablo GTR	**MI**	15
24 DNF	GT	24	(Germany) MRT Lamborghini	(Germany) Michael Trunk (Germany) Bernhard Müller	Lamborghini 6.0L V12	**MI**	15
25 DNF	GT	23	(Germany) KRT Lamborghini	(Germany) Josef Jobst (Germany) Günther Kronseder	Lamborghini Diablo GTR	**MI**	11
25 DNF	GT	23	(Germany) KRT Lamborghini	(Germany) Josef Jobst (Germany) Günther Kronseder	Lamborghini 6.0L V12	**MI**	11
26 DNF	GT	21	(Italy) Racing Box	(Italy) Luca Cappellari (Italy) Raffaele Sangiuolo (Italy) Gabriele Matteuzzi	Chrysler Viper GTS-R	**D**	104
26 DNF	GT	21	(Italy) Racing Box	(Italy) Luca Cappellari (Italy) Raffaele Sangiuolo (Italy) Gabriele Matteuzzi	Chrysler 8.0L V10	**D**	104

== Statistics ==
- Pole position – #25 Carsport Holland – 1:42.707
- Fastest lap – #25 Carsport Holland – 1:31.586
- Average speed – 162.910 km/h

FIA GT Championship
Previous race: 2000 FIA GT Zolder 500km	2000 season	Next race: 2000 FIA GT Lausitzring 500km
