= 2000 FIA GT Monza 500km =

Layout of the Autodromo Nazionale Monza

The 2000 FIA GT Monza 500 km was the third round the 2000 FIA GT Championship season. It took place at the Autodromo Nazionale Monza, Italy, on April 16, 2000.

== Official results ==
Class winners in bold. Cars failing to complete 70% of winner's distance marked as Not Classified (NC).

Pos	Class	No	Team	Drivers	Chassis	Tyre	Laps
Pos	Class	No	Team	Drivers	Engine	Tyre	Laps
1	**GT**	**25**	**(Netherlands) Carsport Holland**	**(Netherlands) Mike Hezemans (Netherlands) David Hart**	**Chrysler Viper GTS-R**	**MI**	**87**
1	**GT**	**25**	**(Netherlands) Carsport Holland**	**(Netherlands) Mike Hezemans (Netherlands) David Hart**	**Chrysler 8.0L V10**	**MI**	**87**
2	GT	3	(Germany) Freisinger Motorsport	(France) Bob Wollek (Germany) Wolfgang Kaufmann	Porsche 911 GT2	**D**	87
2	GT	3	(Germany) Freisinger Motorsport	(France) Bob Wollek (Germany) Wolfgang Kaufmann	Porsche 3.8L Turbo Flat-6	**D**	87
3	GT	14	(United Kingdom) Lister Storm Racing	(United Kingdom) Jamie Campbell-Walter (United Kingdom) Julian Bailey	Lister Storm	**MI**	86
3	GT	14	(United Kingdom) Lister Storm Racing	(United Kingdom) Jamie Campbell-Walter (United Kingdom) Julian Bailey	Jaguar 7.0L V12	**MI**	86
4	GT	2	(United Kingdom) Chamberlain Motorsport	(Switzerland) Walter Brun (Switzerland) Toni Seiler	Chrysler Viper GTS-R	**MI**	86
4	GT	2	(United Kingdom) Chamberlain Motorsport	(Switzerland) Walter Brun (Switzerland) Toni Seiler	Chrysler 8.0L V10	**MI**	86
5	GT	29	(France) Team A.R.T.	(France) Jean-Pierre Jarier (France) François Lafon	Chrysler Viper GTS-R	**MI**	85
5	GT	29	(France) Team A.R.T.	(France) Jean-Pierre Jarier (France) François Lafon	Chrysler 8.0L V10	**MI**	85
6	GT	10	(France) Paul Belmondo Competition	(France) Jean-Claude Lagniez (France) Guy Martinolle	Chrysler Viper GTS-R	**D**	85
6	GT	10	(France) Paul Belmondo Competition	(France) Jean-Claude Lagniez (France) Guy Martinolle	Chrysler 8.0L V10	**D**	85
7	GT	27	(Italy) Autorlando	(Italy) Marco Spinelli (Italy) Fabio Villa (Italy) Gabriele Sabatini	Porsche 911 GT2	**P**	84
7	GT	27	(Italy) Autorlando	(Italy) Marco Spinelli (Italy) Fabio Villa (Italy) Gabriele Sabatini	Porsche 3.8L Turbo Flat-6	**P**	84
8	**N-GT**	**51**	**(United Kingdom) Pennzoil Quaker State G-Force**	**(United Kingdom) Nigel Smith (Belgium) Michel Neugarten**	**Porsche 911 GT3-R**	**D**	**84**
8	**N-GT**	**51**	**(United Kingdom) Pennzoil Quaker State G-Force**	**(United Kingdom) Nigel Smith (Belgium) Michel Neugarten**	**Porsche 3.6L Flat-6**	**D**	**84**
9	N-GT	56	(United Kingdom) EMKA GTC	(United Kingdom) Steve O'Rourke (United Kingdom) Tim Sugden	Porsche 911 GT3-R	**P**	83
9	N-GT	56	(United Kingdom) EMKA GTC	(United Kingdom) Steve O'Rourke (United Kingdom) Tim Sugden	Porsche 3.6L Flat-6	**P**	83
10	N-GT	52	(France) Larbre Compétition Chéreau	(France) Christophe Bouchut (France) Patrice Goueslard	Porsche 911 GT3-R	**MI**	83
10	N-GT	52	(France) Larbre Compétition Chéreau	(France) Christophe Bouchut (France) Patrice Goueslard	Porsche 3.6L Flat-6	**MI**	83
11	N-GT	55	(Italy) ART Engineering	(Italy) Constantino Bertuzzi (Italy) Pierangelo Masselli	Porsche 911 GT3-R	**P**	83
11	N-GT	55	(Italy) ART Engineering	(Italy) Constantino Bertuzzi (Italy) Pierangelo Masselli	Porsche 3.6L Flat-6	**P**	83
12	N-GT	53	(France) Larbre Compétition Chéreau	(France) Ferdinand de Lesseps (France) Jean-Luc Chéreau (Germany) André Ahrlé	Porsche 911 GT3-R	**MI**	81
12	N-GT	53	(France) Larbre Compétition Chéreau	(France) Ferdinand de Lesseps (France) Jean-Luc Chéreau (Germany) André Ahrlé	Porsche 3.6L Flat-6	**MI**	81
13	GT	7	(Germany) Proton Competition	(Germany) Gerold Ried (Germany) Christian Ried (Italy) Renato Mastropietro	Porsche 911 GT2	**Y**	80
13	GT	7	(Germany) Proton Competition	(Germany) Gerold Ried (Germany) Christian Ried (Italy) Renato Mastropietro	Porsche 3.6L Turbo Flat-6	**Y**	80
14	N-GT	66	(Italy) MAC Racing	(Italy) Massimo Frigerio (Italy) Paolo Rapetti	Porsche 911 GT3-R	**D**	80
14	N-GT	66	(Italy) MAC Racing	(Italy) Massimo Frigerio (Italy) Paolo Rapetti	Porsche 3.6L Flat-6	**D**	80
15	N-GT	75	(Switzerland) Kessel Racing	(Switzerland) Loris Kessel (Italy) Andrea Garbagnati (Italy) Paolo Ligresti	Ferrari 360 Modena	**P**	79
15	N-GT	75	(Switzerland) Kessel Racing	(Switzerland) Loris Kessel (Italy) Andrea Garbagnati (Italy) Paolo Ligresti	Ferrari 3.6L V8	**P**	79
16	N-GT	67	(Italy) MAC Racing	(Italy) Roberto Orlandi (Italy) Renato Biciato	Porsche 911 GT3-R	**D**	79
16	N-GT	67	(Italy) MAC Racing	(Italy) Roberto Orlandi (Italy) Renato Biciato	Porsche 3.6L Flat-6	**D**	79
17	N-GT	70	(France) JMB Competition	(Italy) Marco Lambertini (Italy) Batti Pregliasco	Ferrari 360 Modena N-GT	**P**	79
17	N-GT	70	(France) JMB Competition	(Italy) Marco Lambertini (Italy) Batti Pregliasco	Ferrari 3.6L V8	**P**	79
18	N-GT	61	(Italy) Supertech erg	(Italy) Erich Prinoth (Italy) Ivan Capelli	Ferrari 360 Modena	**P**	78
18	N-GT	61	(Italy) Supertech erg	(Italy) Erich Prinoth (Italy) Ivan Capelli	Ferrari 3.6L V8	**P**	78
19	GT	36	(France) Estoril Racing	(Italy) Oscar Rovelli (Portugal) Michel Monteiro	Porsche 911 GT2	**D**	78
19	GT	36	(France) Estoril Racing	(Italy) Oscar Rovelli (Portugal) Michel Monteiro	Porsche 3.6L Turbo Flat-6	**D**	78
20	N-GT	63	(Switzerland) Team LR Organisation	(Italy) Franco Bugané (France) François Migault (Canada) "Raël"	Porsche 911 GT3-R	**P**	77
20	N-GT	63	(Switzerland) Team LR Organisation	(Italy) Franco Bugané (France) François Migault (Canada) "Raël"	Porsche 3.6L Flat-6	**P**	77
21	GT	9	(Switzerland) Haberthur Racing	(Italy) Luca Cattaneo (Italy) Renato Premoli (Italy) Antonio De Castro	Porsche 911 GT2	**D**	67
21	GT	9	(Switzerland) Haberthur Racing	(Italy) Luca Cattaneo (Italy) Renato Premoli (Italy) Antonio De Castro	Porsche 3.8L Turbo Flat-6	**D**	67
22 DNF	N-GT	50	(United Kingdom) Pennzoil Quaker State G-Force	(United Kingdom) Robert Nearn (Sweden) Magnus Wallinder	Porsche 911 GT3-R	**D**	59
22 DNF	N-GT	50	(United Kingdom) Pennzoil Quaker State G-Force	(United Kingdom) Robert Nearn (Sweden) Magnus Wallinder	Porsche 3.6L Flat-6	**D**	59
23 DNF	GT	12	(France) Paul Belmondo Racing	(France) Paul Belmondo (Belgium) Vincent Vosse	Chrysler Viper GTS-R	**D**	52
23 DNF	GT	12	(France) Paul Belmondo Racing	(France) Paul Belmondo (Belgium) Vincent Vosse	Chrysler 8.0L V10	**D**	52
24 DNF	N-GT	77	(Germany) RWS Red Bull Racing	(Italy) Luca Riccitelli (Austria) Hans-Jörg Hofer (Belgium) Hans Willems	Porsche 911 GT3-R	**MI**	51
24 DNF	N-GT	77	(Germany) RWS Red Bull Racing	(Italy) Luca Riccitelli (Austria) Hans-Jörg Hofer (Belgium) Hans Willems	Porsche 3.6L Flat-6	**MI**	51
25 DNF	N-GT	54	(France) Noël del Bello Racing	(France) Jean-Luc Maury-Laribiére (France) Patrick Caternet (France) Jacques Corbet	Porsche 911 GT3-R	**D**	44
25 DNF	N-GT	54	(France) Noël del Bello Racing	(France) Jean-Luc Maury-Laribiére (France) Patrick Caternet (France) Jacques Corbet	Porsche 3.6L Flat-6	**D**	44
26 DNF	GT	5	(Germany) Konrad Motorsport	(Austria) Franz Konrad (Germany) Jürgen von Gartzen	Porsche 911 GT2	**D**	41
26 DNF	GT	5	(Germany) Konrad Motorsport	(Austria) Franz Konrad (Germany) Jürgen von Gartzen	Porsche 3.8L Turbo Flat-6	**D**	41
27 DNF	GT	15	(United Kingdom) Lister Storm Racing	(United Kingdom) Peter Hardman (Germany) Nicolaus Springer (Switzerland) Philippe Favre	Lister Storm	**MI**	26
27 DNF	GT	15	(United Kingdom) Lister Storm Racing	(United Kingdom) Peter Hardman (Germany) Nicolaus Springer (Switzerland) Philippe Favre	Jaguar 7.0L V12	**MI**	26
28 DNF	GT	22	(Germany) Wieth Racing	(Germany) Niko Wieth (Germany) Franz Wieth	Porsche 911 GT2	**D**	22
28 DNF	GT	22	(Germany) Wieth Racing	(Germany) Niko Wieth (Germany) Franz Wieth	Porsche 3.8L Turbo Flat-6	**D**	22
29 DNF	GT	8	(Switzerland) Haberthur Racing	(France) Patrick Vuillaume (Italy) Mauro Casadei (Switzerland) Riccardo Schmid	Porsche 911 GT2	**D**	19
29 DNF	GT	8	(Switzerland) Haberthur Racing	(France) Patrick Vuillaume (Italy) Mauro Casadei (Switzerland) Riccardo Schmid	Porsche 3.8L Turbo Flat-6	**D**	19
30 DNF	GT	16	(Switzerland) First Racing	(France) Fabien Giroix (Switzerland) Jean-Denis Délétraz	Ferrari 550 Maranello	**D**	9
30 DNF	GT	16	(Switzerland) First Racing	(France) Fabien Giroix (Switzerland) Jean-Denis Délétraz	Ferrari 6.0L V12	**D**	9
31 DNF	N-GT	60	(Switzerland) Haberthur Racing	(Italy) Fabio Rosa (Italy) Fabio Babini	Porsche 911 GT3-R	?	8
31 DNF	N-GT	60	(Switzerland) Haberthur Racing	(Italy) Fabio Rosa (Italy) Fabio Babini	Porsche 3.6L Flat-6	?	8
32 DNF	GT	4	(Germany) Freisinger Motorsport	(Germany) Ernst Palmberger (Japan) Yukihiro Hane	Porsche 911 GT2	**D**	2
32 DNF	GT	4	(Germany) Freisinger Motorsport	(Germany) Ernst Palmberger (Japan) Yukihiro Hane	Porsche 3.8L Turbo Flat-6	**D**	2
33 DNF	GT	11	(France) Paul Belmondo Racing	(France) Boris Derichebourg (France) Claude-Yves Gosselin	Chrysler Viper GTS-R	**D**	2
33 DNF	GT	11	(France) Paul Belmondo Racing	(France) Boris Derichebourg (France) Claude-Yves Gosselin	Chrysler 8.0L V10	**D**	2
34 DNF	GT	19	(Netherlands) Marcos Racing International	(Netherlands) Cor Euser (Netherlands) Herman Buurman (Germany) Harald Becker	Marcos Mantara LM600	**D**	1
34 DNF	GT	19	(Netherlands) Marcos Racing International	(Netherlands) Cor Euser (Netherlands) Herman Buurman (Germany) Harald Becker	Chevrolet 5.9L V8	**D**	1
35 DNF	GT	21	(Italy) Racing Box	(Italy) Luca Cappellari (Italy) Raffaele Sangiuolo (Italy) Gabriele Matteuzzi	Chrysler Viper GTS-R	**D**	1
35 DNF	GT	21	(Italy) Racing Box	(Italy) Luca Cappellari (Italy) Raffaele Sangiuolo (Italy) Gabriele Matteuzzi	Chrysler 8.0L V10	**D**	1
36 DNF	GT	28	(Germany) RWS	(Austria) Horst Felbermayr, Sr. (Austria) Horst Felbermayr, Jr.	Porsche 911 GT2	?	0
36 DNF	GT	28	(Germany) RWS	(Austria) Horst Felbermayr, Sr. (Austria) Horst Felbermayr, Jr.	Porsche 3.8L Turbo Flat-6	?	0
DNS	GT	1	(United Kingdom) Chamberlain Motorsport	(France) Xavier Pompidou (South Africa) Stephen Watson	Chrysler Viper GTS-R	**MI**	–
DNS	GT	1	(United Kingdom) Chamberlain Motorsport	(France) Xavier Pompidou (South Africa) Stephen Watson	Chrysler 8.0L V10	**MI**	–

== Statistics ==
- Pole position – #25 Carsport Holland – 1:58.250
- Fastest lap – #14 Lister Storm Racing – 1:46.665
- Average speed – 184.284 km/h

FIA GT Championship
Previous race: 2000 FIA GT Estoril 500km	2000 season	Next race: 2000 FIA GT Silverstone 500km
