= 2000 FIA GT Zolder 500km =

Layout of the Circuit Zolder (1986-2001)

The 2000 FIA GT Zolder 500 km was the sixth round the 2000 FIA GT Championship season. It took place at the Circuit Zolder, Belgium, on July 23, 2000.

== Official results ==
Class winners in bold. Cars failing to complete 70% of winner's distance marked as Not Classified (NC).

Pos	Class	No	Team	Drivers	Chassis	Tyre	Laps
Pos	Class	No	Team	Drivers	Engine	Tyre	Laps
1	**GT**	**14**	**(United Kingdom) Lister Storm Racing**	**(United Kingdom) Jamie Campbell-Walter (United Kingdom) Julian Bailey**	**Lister Storm**	**MI**	**108**
1	**GT**	**14**	**(United Kingdom) Lister Storm Racing**	**(United Kingdom) Jamie Campbell-Walter (United Kingdom) Julian Bailey**	**Jaguar 7.0L V12**	**MI**	**108**
2	GT	12	(France) Paul Belmondo Racing	(France) Boris Derichebourg (Belgium) Vincent Vosse	Chrysler Viper GTS-R	**D**	108
2	GT	12	(France) Paul Belmondo Racing	(France) Boris Derichebourg (Belgium) Vincent Vosse	Chrysler 8.0L V10	**D**	108
3	GT	11	(France) Paul Belmondo Racing	(France) Paul Belmondo (Belgium) Marc Duez	Chrysler Viper GTS-R	**D**	107
3	GT	11	(France) Paul Belmondo Racing	(France) Paul Belmondo (Belgium) Marc Duez	Chrysler 8.0L V10	**D**	107
4	GT	3	(Germany) Freisinger Motorsport	(Belgium) Bert Longin (Germany) Wolfgang Kaufmann	Porsche 911 GT2	**D**	106
4	GT	3	(Germany) Freisinger Motorsport	(Belgium) Bert Longin (Germany) Wolfgang Kaufmann	Porsche 3.8L Turbo Flat-6	**D**	106
5	GT	19	(Netherlands) Marcos Racing International	(Netherlands) Cor Euser (Germany) Harald Becker	Marcos Mantara LM600	**D**	105
5	GT	19	(Netherlands) Marcos Racing International	(Netherlands) Cor Euser (Germany) Harald Becker	Chevrolet 5.9L V8	**D**	105
6	GT	4	(Germany) Freisinger Motorsport	(Germany) Ernst Palmberger (Japan) Yukihiro Hane	Porsche 911 GT2	**D**	104
6	GT	4	(Germany) Freisinger Motorsport	(Germany) Ernst Palmberger (Japan) Yukihiro Hane	Porsche 3.8L Turbo Flat-6	**D**	104
7	GT	21	(Italy) Racing Box	(Italy) Luca Cappellari (Italy) Raffaele Sangiuolo (Italy) Gabriele Matteuzzi	Chrysler Viper GTS-R	**D**	104
7	GT	21	(Italy) Racing Box	(Italy) Luca Cappellari (Italy) Raffaele Sangiuolo (Italy) Gabriele Matteuzzi	Chrysler 8.0L V10	**D**	104
8	**N-GT**	**77**	**(Germany) RWS Red Bull Racing**	**(Italy) Luca Riccitelli (Belgium) Hans Willems**	**Porsche 911 GT3-R**	**MI**	**104**
8	**N-GT**	**77**	**(Germany) RWS Red Bull Racing**	**(Italy) Luca Riccitelli (Belgium) Hans Willems**	**Porsche 3.6L Flat-6**	**MI**	**104**
9	N-GT	52	(France) Larbre Compétition Chéreau	(France) Christophe Bouchut (France) Patrice Goueslard	Porsche 911 GT3-R	**MI**	104
9	N-GT	52	(France) Larbre Compétition Chéreau	(France) Christophe Bouchut (France) Patrice Goueslard	Porsche 3.6L Flat-6	**MI**	104
10	N-GT	51	(United Kingdom) Pennzoil Quaker State G-Force	(United Kingdom) Richard Nearn (Belgium) Michel Neugarten	Porsche 911 GT3-R	**D**	102
10	N-GT	51	(United Kingdom) Pennzoil Quaker State G-Force	(United Kingdom) Richard Nearn (Belgium) Michel Neugarten	Porsche 3.6L Flat-6	**D**	102
11	GT	27	(Italy) Autorlando	(Italy) Marco Spinelli (Italy) Fabio Villa (Italy) Gabriele Sabatini	Porsche 911 GT2	**P**	102
11	GT	27	(Italy) Autorlando	(Italy) Marco Spinelli (Italy) Fabio Villa (Italy) Gabriele Sabatini	Porsche 3.8L Turbo Flat-6	**P**	102
12	GT	8	(Switzerland) Haberthur Racing	(France) Patrick Vuillaume (Belgium) Erik Bruynoghe (Italy) Mauro Casadei	Porsche 911 GT2	**D**	102
12	GT	8	(Switzerland) Haberthur Racing	(France) Patrick Vuillaume (Belgium) Erik Bruynoghe (Italy) Mauro Casadei	Porsche 3.8L Turbo Flat-6	**D**	102
13	N-GT	50	(United Kingdom) Pennzoil Quaker State G-Force	(United Kingdom) Nigel Smith (Sweden) Magnus Wallinder	Porsche 911 GT3-R	**D**	102
13	N-GT	50	(United Kingdom) Pennzoil Quaker State G-Force	(United Kingdom) Nigel Smith (Sweden) Magnus Wallinder	Porsche 3.6L Flat-6	**D**	102
14	N-GT	53	(France) Larbre Compétition Chéreau	(France) Ferdinand de Lesseps (France) Jean-Luc Chéreau (Germany) André Ahrlé	Porsche 911 GT3-R	**MI**	102
14	N-GT	53	(France) Larbre Compétition Chéreau	(France) Ferdinand de Lesseps (France) Jean-Luc Chéreau (Germany) André Ahrlé	Porsche 3.6L Flat-6	**MI**	102
15	N-GT	67	(Italy) MAC Racing	(Italy) Fabio Mancini (Italy) Gianni Collini	Porsche 911 GT3-R	**D**	100
15	N-GT	67	(Italy) MAC Racing	(Italy) Fabio Mancini (Italy) Gianni Collini	Porsche 3.6L Flat-6	**D**	100
16	GT	7	(Germany) Proton Competition	(Germany) Gerold Ried (Germany) Christian Ried	Porsche 911 GT2	**Y**	100
16	GT	7	(Germany) Proton Competition	(Germany) Gerold Ried (Germany) Christian Ried	Porsche 3.6L Turbo Flat-6	**Y**	100
17	GT	5	(Germany) Konrad Motorsport	(Austria) Franz Konrad (Germany) Jürgen von Gartzen	Porsche 911 GT2	**D**	99
17	GT	5	(Germany) Konrad Motorsport	(Austria) Franz Konrad (Germany) Jürgen von Gartzen	Porsche 3.8L Turbo Flat-6	**D**	99
18	N-GT	78	(United Kingdom) Cirtek Motorsport	(United Kingdom) Adam Simmons (United Kingdom) Ian Gibbons (Germany) Jürgen Lorenz	Porsche 911 GT3-R	?	98
18	N-GT	78	(United Kingdom) Cirtek Motorsport	(United Kingdom) Adam Simmons (United Kingdom) Ian Gibbons (Germany) Jürgen Lorenz	Porsche 3.6L Flat-6	?	98
19	N-GT	70	(France) JMB Competition	(Italy) Batti Pregliasco (Italy) Christian Pescatori (Italy) Marco Lambertini	Ferrari 360 Modena N-GT	**P**	97
19	N-GT	70	(France) JMB Competition	(Italy) Batti Pregliasco (Italy) Christian Pescatori (Italy) Marco Lambertini	Ferrari 3.6L V8	**P**	97
20	N-GT	71	(France) JMB Competition	(France) Philippe Alliot (Netherlands) Peter Kutemann	Ferrari 360 Modena N-GT	**P**	96
20	N-GT	71	(France) JMB Competition	(France) Philippe Alliot (Netherlands) Peter Kutemann	Ferrari 3.6L V8	**P**	96
21	GT	33	(United Kingdom) Cirtek Motorsport	(United Kingdom) Jonathan Baker (Australia) Charlie Cox	Porsche 911 GT2	?	90
21	GT	33	(United Kingdom) Cirtek Motorsport	(United Kingdom) Jonathan Baker (Australia) Charlie Cox	Porsche 3.8L Turbo Flat-6	?	90
22 NC	N-GT	56	(United Kingdom) EMKA GTC	(United Kingdom) Steve O'Rourke (United Kingdom) Tim Sugden	Porsche 911 GT3-R	**P**	67
22 NC	N-GT	56	(United Kingdom) EMKA GTC	(United Kingdom) Steve O'Rourke (United Kingdom) Tim Sugden	Porsche 3.6L Flat-6	**P**	67
23 DNF	N-GT	79	(Germany) RWS Red Bull Racing	(Italy) Giorgio Tibaldo (Austria) Hans-Jörg Hofer	Porsche 911 GT3-R	**MI**	98
23 DNF	N-GT	79	(Germany) RWS Red Bull Racing	(Italy) Giorgio Tibaldo (Austria) Hans-Jörg Hofer	Porsche 3.6L Flat-6	**MI**	98
24 DNF	N-GT	66	(Italy) MAC Racing	(Switzerland) Massimo Cattori (Italy) Paolo Rapetti	Porsche 911 GT3-R	**D**	52
24 DNF	N-GT	66	(Italy) MAC Racing	(Switzerland) Massimo Cattori (Italy) Paolo Rapetti	Porsche 3.6L Flat-6	**D**	52
25 DNF	GT	25	(Netherlands) Carsport Holland	(Netherlands) Mike Hezemans (Netherlands) David Hart	Chrysler Viper GTS-R	**MI**	48
25 DNF	GT	25	(Netherlands) Carsport Holland	(Netherlands) Mike Hezemans (Netherlands) David Hart	Chrysler 8.0L V10	**MI**	48
26 DNF	GT	15	(United Kingdom) Lister Storm Racing	(Germany) Nicolaus Springer (United Kingdom) Tiff Needell	Lister Storm	**MI**	46
26 DNF	GT	15	(United Kingdom) Lister Storm Racing	(Germany) Nicolaus Springer (United Kingdom) Tiff Needell	Jaguar 7.0L V12	**MI**	46
27 DNF	N-GT	55	(Italy) ART Engineering	(Italy) Constantino Bertuzzi (Italy) Pierangelo Masselli	Porsche 911 GT3-R	**P**	43
27 DNF	N-GT	55	(Italy) ART Engineering	(Italy) Constantino Bertuzzi (Italy) Pierangelo Masselli	Porsche 3.6L Flat-6	**P**	43
28 DNF	GT	22	(Germany) Wieth Racing	(Germany) Niko Wieth (Germany) Franz Wieth	Porsche 911 GT2	**D**	5
28 DNF	GT	22	(Germany) Wieth Racing	(Germany) Niko Wieth (Germany) Franz Wieth	Porsche 3.8L Turbo Flat-6	**D**	5
29 DNF	GT	3	(Switzerland) First Racing	(France) Fabien Giroix (Switzerland) Jean-Denis Délétraz	Ferrari 550 Maranello	**D**	3
29 DNF	GT	3	(Switzerland) First Racing	(France) Fabien Giroix (Switzerland) Jean-Denis Délétraz	Ferrari 6.0L V12	**D**	3

== Statistics ==
- Pole position - #14 Lister Storm Racing - 1:34.527
- Fastest lap - #25 Carsport Holland - 1:36.032
- Average speed - 149.510 km/h

FIA GT Championship
Previous race: 2000 FIA GT Budapest 500km	2000 season	Next race: 2000 FIA GT A1-Ring 500km
