= 2000 FIA GT Brno 500km =

Layout of the Brno Circuit

The 2000 FIA GT Brno 500 km was the ninth round the 2000 FIA GT Championship season. It took place at the Masaryk Circuit, Czech Republic, on September 17, 2000.

== Official results ==
Class winners in bold. Cars failing to complete 70% of winner's distance marked as Not Classified (NC).

Pos	Class	No	Team	Drivers	Chassis	Tyre	Laps
Pos	Class	No	Team	Drivers	Engine	Tyre	Laps
1	**GT**	**25**	**(Netherlands) Carsport Holland**	**(Netherlands) Mike Hezemans (Netherlands) David Hart**	**Chrysler Viper GTS-R**	MI	**73**
1	**GT**	**25**	**(Netherlands) Carsport Holland**	**(Netherlands) Mike Hezemans (Netherlands) David Hart**	**Chrysler 8.0L V10**	MI	**73**
2	GT	14	(United Kingdom) Lister Storm Racing	(United Kingdom) Jamie Campbell-Walter (United Kingdom) Julian Bailey	Lister Storm	MI	73
2	GT	14	(United Kingdom) Lister Storm Racing	(United Kingdom) Jamie Campbell-Walter (United Kingdom) Julian Bailey	Jaguar 7.0L V12	MI	73
3	GT	15	(United Kingdom) Lister Storm Racing	(Germany) Nicolaus Springer (Switzerland) Philippe Favre	Lister Storm	MI	73
3	GT	15	(United Kingdom) Lister Storm Racing	(Germany) Nicolaus Springer (Switzerland) Philippe Favre	Jaguar 7.0L V12	MI	73
4	GT	12	(France) Paul Belmondo Racing	(France) Boris Derichebourg (Belgium) Vincent Vosse	Chrysler Viper GTS-R	D	73
4	GT	12	(France) Paul Belmondo Racing	(France) Boris Derichebourg (Belgium) Vincent Vosse	Chrysler 8.0L V10	D	73
5	GT	3	(Germany) Freisinger Motorsport	(Germany) Hubert Haupt (Germany) Wolfgang Kaufmann	Porsche 911 GT2	D	72
5	GT	3	(Germany) Freisinger Motorsport	(Germany) Hubert Haupt (Germany) Wolfgang Kaufmann	Porsche 3.8L Turbo Flat-6	D	72
6	GT	11	(France) Paul Belmondo Racing	(France) Paul Belmondo (France) Claude-Yves Gosselin	Chrysler Viper GTS-R	D	72
6	GT	11	(France) Paul Belmondo Racing	(France) Paul Belmondo (France) Claude-Yves Gosselin	Chrysler 8.0L V10	D	72
7	**N-GT**	**52**	**(France) Larbre Compétition Chéreau**	**(France) Christophe Bouchut (France) Patrice Goueslard**	**Porsche 911 GT3-R**	MI	**71**
7	**N-GT**	**52**	**(France) Larbre Compétition Chéreau**	**(France) Christophe Bouchut (France) Patrice Goueslard**	**Porsche 3.6L Flat-6**	MI	**71**
8	N-GT	77	(Germany) RWS Red Bull Racing	(Italy) Luca Riccitelli (Austria) Dieter Quester	Porsche 911 GT3-R	MI	71
8	N-GT	77	(Germany) RWS Red Bull Racing	(Italy) Luca Riccitelli (Austria) Dieter Quester	Porsche 3.6L Flat-6	MI	71
9	N-GT	53	(France) Larbre Compétition Chéreau	(France) Ferdinand de Lesseps (Germany) André Ahrlé	Porsche 911 GT3-R	MI	70
9	N-GT	53	(France) Larbre Compétition Chéreau	(France) Ferdinand de Lesseps (Germany) André Ahrlé	Porsche 3.6L Flat-6	MI	70
10	GT	4	(Germany) Freisinger Motorsport	(Germany) Ernst Palmberger (France) Cyril Chateau	Porsche 911 GT2	D	70
10	GT	4	(Germany) Freisinger Motorsport	(Germany) Ernst Palmberger (France) Cyril Chateau	Porsche 3.8L Turbo Flat-6	D	70
11	N-GT	79	(Germany) RWS Red Bull Racing	(France) Bob Wollek (Austria) Hans-Jörg Hofer	Porsche 911 GT3-R	MI	70
11	N-GT	79	(Germany) RWS Red Bull Racing	(France) Bob Wollek (Austria) Hans-Jörg Hofer	Porsche 3.6L Flat-6	MI	70
12	N-GT	60	(Switzerland) Haberthur Racing	(France) Michel Ligonnet (Belgium) Michael Neugarten	Porsche 911 GT3-R	D	70
12	N-GT	60	(Switzerland) Haberthur Racing	(France) Michel Ligonnet (Belgium) Michael Neugarten	Porsche 3.6L Flat-6	D	70
13	N-GT	55	(Italy) ART Engineering	(Italy) Constantino Bertuzzi (Italy) Pierangelo Masselli	Porsche 911 GT3-R	P	70
13	N-GT	55	(Italy) ART Engineering	(Italy) Constantino Bertuzzi (Italy) Pierangelo Masselli	Porsche 3.6L Flat-6	P	70
14	GT	22	(Germany) Wieth Racing	(Germany) Niko Wieth (Germany) Franz Wieth	Porsche 911 GT2	D	70
14	GT	22	(Germany) Wieth Racing	(Germany) Niko Wieth (Germany) Franz Wieth	Porsche 3.8L Turbo Flat-6	D	70
15	GT	27	(Italy) Autorlando	(Italy) Marco Spinelli (Italy) Gabriele Sabatini (Italy) Fabio Villa	Porsche 911 GT2	P	68
15	GT	27	(Italy) Autorlando	(Italy) Marco Spinelli (Italy) Gabriele Sabatini (Italy) Fabio Villa	Porsche 3.8L Turbo Flat-6	P	68
16	GT	8	(Switzerland) Haberthur Racing	(Italy) Roberto Orlandi (Italy) Mauro Casadei (Austria) Manfred Jurasz	Porsche 911 GT2	D	68
16	GT	8	(Switzerland) Haberthur Racing	(Italy) Roberto Orlandi (Italy) Mauro Casadei (Austria) Manfred Jurasz	Porsche 3.8L Turbo Flat-6	D	68
17	GT	7	(Germany) Proton Competition	(Germany) Gerold Ried (Germany) Christian Ried	Porsche 911 GT2	Y	68
17	GT	7	(Germany) Proton Competition	(Germany) Gerold Ried (Germany) Christian Ried	Porsche 3.6L Turbo Flat-6	Y	68
18	N-GT	57	(Italy) ART Engineering	(Italy) Paolo Rapetti (Italy) Franco Bertoli	Porsche 911 GT3-R	P	67
18	N-GT	57	(Italy) ART Engineering	(Italy) Paolo Rapetti (Italy) Franco Bertoli	Porsche 3.6L Flat-6	P	67
19	GT	21	(Italy) Racing Box	(Italy) Luca Cappellari (Italy) Raffaele Sangiuolo (Italy) Gabriele Matteuzzi	Chrysler Viper GTS-R	D	66
19	GT	21	(Italy) Racing Box	(Italy) Luca Cappellari (Italy) Raffaele Sangiuolo (Italy) Gabriele Matteuzzi	Chrysler 8.0L V10	D	66
20 DNF	N-GT	51	(United Kingdom) Pennzoil Quaker State G-Force	(United Kingdom) Richard Nearn (United Kingdom) Geoff Lister	Porsche 911 GT3-R	D	53
20 DNF	N-GT	51	(United Kingdom) Pennzoil Quaker State G-Force	(United Kingdom) Richard Nearn (United Kingdom) Geoff Lister	Porsche 3.6L Flat-6	D	53
21 DNF	GT	24	(Germany) Reiter Engineering	(Germany) Michael Trunk (Germany) Bernhard Müller	Lamborghini Diablo GT	MI	28
21 DNF	GT	24	(Germany) Reiter Engineering	(Germany) Michael Trunk (Germany) Bernhard Müller	Lamborghini 6.0L V12	MI	28
22 DNF	N-GT	50	(United Kingdom) Pennzoil Quaker State G-Force	(United Kingdom) Nigel Smith (Sweden) Magnus Wallinder	Porsche 911 GT3-R	D	19
22 DNF	N-GT	50	(United Kingdom) Pennzoil Quaker State G-Force	(United Kingdom) Nigel Smith (Sweden) Magnus Wallinder	Porsche 3.6L Flat-6	D	19
23 DNF	GT	16	(Switzerland) First Racing	(France) Fabien Giroix (Switzerland) Jean-Denis Délétraz	Ferrari 550 Maranello	D	12
23 DNF	GT	16	(Switzerland) First Racing	(France) Fabien Giroix (Switzerland) Jean-Denis Délétraz	Ferrari 6.0L V12	D	12
24 DNF	GT	23	(Germany) KRT Lamborghini Racing	(Germany) Josef Jobst (Germany) Günther Kronseder	Lamborghini Diablo GT	MI	8
24 DNF	GT	23	(Germany) KRT Lamborghini Racing	(Germany) Josef Jobst (Germany) Günther Kronseder	Lamborghini 6.0L V12	MI	8

== Statistics ==
- Pole position – #14 Lister Storm Racing – 2:00.157
- Fastest lap – #14 Lister Storm Racing – 2:14.128
- Average speed – 133.240 km/h

FIA GT Championship
Previous race: 2000 FIA GT Lausitzring 500km	2000 season	Next race: 2000 FIA GT Magny-Cours 500km
