= 2000 FIA GT Valencia 500km =

Layout of the Circuit Ricardo Tormo

The 2000 FIA GT Valencia 500 km was the first round the 2000 FIA GT Championship season. It took place at the Circuit Ricardo Tormo, Spain, on March 26, 2000.

== Official results ==
Class winners in bold. Cars failing to complete 70% of winner's distance marked as Not Classified (NC).

Pos	Class	No	Team	Drivers	Chassis	Tyre	Laps
Pos	Class	No	Team	Drivers	Engine	Tyre	Laps
1	**GT**	**14**	**(United Kingdom) Lister Storm Racing**	**(United Kingdom) Jamie Campbell-Walter (United Kingdom) Julian Bailey**	**Lister Storm**	**MI**	**109**
1	**GT**	**14**	**(United Kingdom) Lister Storm Racing**	**(United Kingdom) Jamie Campbell-Walter (United Kingdom) Julian Bailey**	**Jaguar 7.0L V12**	**MI**	**109**
2	GT	12	(France) Paul Belmondo Racing	(France) Paul Belmondo (Belgium) Vincent Vosse	Chrysler Viper GTS-R	**D**	108
2	GT	12	(France) Paul Belmondo Racing	(France) Paul Belmondo (Belgium) Vincent Vosse	Chrysler 8.0L V10	**D**	108
3	GT	11	(France) Paul Belmondo Racing	(France) Boris Derichebourg (France) Claude-Yves Gosselin	Chrysler Viper GTS-R	**D**	108
3	GT	11	(France) Paul Belmondo Racing	(France) Boris Derichebourg (France) Claude-Yves Gosselin	Chrysler 8.0L V10	**D**	108
4	GT	25	(Netherlands) Carsport Holland	(Netherlands) Mike Hezemans (Netherlands) David Hart	Chrysler Viper GTS-R	**MI**	108
4	GT	25	(Netherlands) Carsport Holland	(Netherlands) Mike Hezemans (Netherlands) David Hart	Chrysler 8.0L V10	**MI**	108
5	GT	4	(Germany) Freisinger Motorsport	(Germany) Ernst Palmberger (Japan) Yukihiro Hane	Porsche 911 GT2	**D**	106
5	GT	4	(Germany) Freisinger Motorsport	(Germany) Ernst Palmberger (Japan) Yukihiro Hane	Porsche 3.8L Turbo Flat-6	**D**	106
6	GT	2	(United Kingdom) Chamberlain Motorsport	(Switzerland) Walter Brun (Switzerland) Toni Seiler	Chrysler Viper GTS-R	**MI**	105
6	GT	2	(United Kingdom) Chamberlain Motorsport	(Switzerland) Walter Brun (Switzerland) Toni Seiler	Chrysler 8.0L V10	**MI**	105
7	GT	10	(France) Paul Belmondo Competition	(France) Jean-Claude Lagniez (France) Guy Martinolle	Chrysler Viper GTS-R	**D**	105
7	GT	10	(France) Paul Belmondo Competition	(France) Jean-Claude Lagniez (France) Guy Martinolle	Chrysler 8.0L V10	**D**	105
8	**N-GT**	**52**	**(France) Larbre Compétition Chéreau**	**(France) Christophe Bouchut (France) Patrice Goueslard**	**Porsche 911 GT3-R**	**MI**	**105**
8	**N-GT**	**52**	**(France) Larbre Compétition Chéreau**	**(France) Christophe Bouchut (France) Patrice Goueslard**	**Porsche 3.6L Flat-6**	**MI**	**105**
9	GT	5	(Germany) Konrad Motorsport	(Austria) Franz Konrad (Germany) Jürgen von Gartzen	Porsche 911 GT2	**D**	105
9	GT	5	(Germany) Konrad Motorsport	(Austria) Franz Konrad (Germany) Jürgen von Gartzen	Porsche 3.8L Turbo Flat-6	**D**	105
10	N-GT	50	(United Kingdom) Pennzoil Quaker State G-Force	(United Kingdom) Robert Nearn (Sweden) Magnus Wallinder	Porsche 911 GT3-R	**D**	104
10	N-GT	50	(United Kingdom) Pennzoil Quaker State G-Force	(United Kingdom) Robert Nearn (Sweden) Magnus Wallinder	Porsche 3.6L Flat-6	**D**	104
11	GT	8	(Switzerland) Haberthur Racing	(France) Michel Ligonnet (Italy) Mauro Casadei (Spain) Alberto Castello	Porsche 911 GT2	**D**	103
11	GT	8	(Switzerland) Haberthur Racing	(France) Michel Ligonnet (Italy) Mauro Casadei (Spain) Alberto Castello	Porsche 3.8L Turbo Flat-6	**D**	103
12	N-GT	56	(United Kingdom) EMKA GTC	(United Kingdom) Steve O'Rourke (United Kingdom) Tim Sugden	Porsche 911 GT3-R	**P**	103
12	N-GT	56	(United Kingdom) EMKA GTC	(United Kingdom) Steve O'Rourke (United Kingdom) Tim Sugden	Porsche 3.6L Flat-6	**P**	103
13	GT	28	(Germany) RWS	(Austria) Horst Felbermayr, Sr. (Austria) Horst Felbermayr, Jr.	Porsche 911 GT2	?	103
13	GT	28	(Germany) RWS	(Austria) Horst Felbermayr, Sr. (Austria) Horst Felbermayr, Jr.	Porsche 3.8L Turbo Flat-6	?	103
14	N-GT	53	(France) Larbre Compétition Chéreau	(France) Ferdinand de Lesseps (France) Jean-Luc Chéreau	Porsche 911 GT3-R	**MI**	103
14	N-GT	53	(France) Larbre Compétition Chéreau	(France) Ferdinand de Lesseps (France) Jean-Luc Chéreau	Porsche 3.6L Flat-6	**MI**	103
15	N-GT	77	(Germany) RWS Red Bull Racing	(Italy) Luca Riccitelli (Austria) Hans-Jörg Hofer (Belgium) Hans Willems	Porsche 911 GT3-R	**MI**	103
15	N-GT	77	(Germany) RWS Red Bull Racing	(Italy) Luca Riccitelli (Austria) Hans-Jörg Hofer (Belgium) Hans Willems	Porsche 3.6L Flat-6	**MI**	103
16	N-GT	64	(France) Perspective Racing	(France) Thierry Perrier (France) Jean-Paul Richard (France) Gérard Larrousse	Porsche 911 GT3-R	**P**	102
16	N-GT	64	(France) Perspective Racing	(France) Thierry Perrier (France) Jean-Paul Richard (France) Gérard Larrousse	Porsche 3.6L Flat-6	**P**	102
17	GT	7	(Germany) Proton Competition	(Germany) Gerold Ried (Germany) Christian Ried	Porsche 911 GT2	**Y**	101
17	GT	7	(Germany) Proton Competition	(Germany) Gerold Ried (Germany) Christian Ried	Porsche 3.6L Turbo Flat-6	**Y**	101
18	GT	27	(Italy) Autorlando	(Italy) Marco Spinelli (Italy) Fabio Villa (Italy) Gabriele Sabatini	Porsche 911 GT2	**P**	100
18	GT	27	(Italy) Autorlando	(Italy) Marco Spinelli (Italy) Fabio Villa (Italy) Gabriele Sabatini	Porsche 3.8L Turbo Flat-6	**P**	100
19	GT	21	(Italy) Racing Box	(Italy) Luca Cappellari (Italy) Raffaele Sangiuolo (Italy) Gabriele Matteuzzi	Chrysler Viper GTS-R	**D**	100
19	GT	21	(Italy) Racing Box	(Italy) Luca Cappellari (Italy) Raffaele Sangiuolo (Italy) Gabriele Matteuzzi	Chrysler 8.0L V10	**D**	100
20	N-GT	66	(Italy) MAC Racing	(Italy) Massimo Frigerio (Italy) Paolo Rapetti	Porsche 911 GT3-R	**D**	98
20	N-GT	66	(Italy) MAC Racing	(Italy) Massimo Frigerio (Italy) Paolo Rapetti	Porsche 3.6L Flat-6	**D**	98
21	GT	32	(Germany) Seikel Motorsport	(France) Francis Werner (France) Jacques Piattier	Porsche 911 GT2	**D**	97
21	GT	32	(Germany) Seikel Motorsport	(France) Francis Werner (France) Jacques Piattier	Porsche 3.8L Turbo Flat-6	**D**	97
22	N-GT	51	(United Kingdom) Pennzoil Quaker State G-Force	(United Kingdom) Nigel Smith (Belgium) Michel Neugarten	Porsche 911 GT3-R	**D**	96
22	N-GT	51	(United Kingdom) Pennzoil Quaker State G-Force	(United Kingdom) Nigel Smith (Belgium) Michel Neugarten	Porsche 3.6L Flat-6	**D**	96
23	N-GT	54	(France) Noël del Bello Racing	(France) Jean-Luc Maury-Laribiére (France) Marc Sourd (France) Bernard Chauvin	Porsche 911 GT3-R	**D**	95
23	N-GT	54	(France) Noël del Bello Racing	(France) Jean-Luc Maury-Laribiére (France) Marc Sourd (France) Bernard Chauvin	Porsche 3.6L Flat-6	**D**	95
24	GT	22	(Germany) Wieth Racing	(Germany) Niko Wieth (Germany) Franz Wieth	Porsche 911 GT2	**D**	85
24	GT	22	(Germany) Wieth Racing	(Germany) Niko Wieth (Germany) Franz Wieth	Porsche 3.8L Turbo Flat-6	**D**	85
25 DNF	GT	3	(Germany) Freisinger Motorsport	(France) Bob Wollek (Germany) Wolfgang Kaufmann	Porsche 911 GT2	**D**	73
25 DNF	GT	3	(Germany) Freisinger Motorsport	(France) Bob Wollek (Germany) Wolfgang Kaufmann	Porsche 3.8L Turbo Flat-6	**D**	73
26 DNF	GT	9	(Switzerland) Haberthur Racing	(France) Jacques Corbet (France) Patrick Vuillaume (Spain) Paco Orti	Porsche 911 GT2	**D**	69
26 DNF	GT	9	(Switzerland) Haberthur Racing	(France) Jacques Corbet (France) Patrick Vuillaume (Spain) Paco Orti	Porsche 3.8L Turbo Flat-6	**D**	69
27 DNF	GT	15	(United Kingdom) Lister Storm Racing	(United Kingdom) Peter Hardman (Germany) Nicolaus Springer (Spain) Carlos Palau	Lister Storm	**MI**	48
27 DNF	GT	15	(United Kingdom) Lister Storm Racing	(United Kingdom) Peter Hardman (Germany) Nicolaus Springer (Spain) Carlos Palau	Jaguar 7.0L V12	**MI**	48
28 DNF	GT	19	(Netherlands) Marcos Racing International	(Netherlands) Cor Euser (United Kingdom) Christian Vann	Marcos Mantara LM600	**D**	43
28 DNF	GT	19	(Netherlands) Marcos Racing International	(Netherlands) Cor Euser (United Kingdom) Christian Vann	Chevrolet 5.9L V8	**D**	43
29 DNF	GT	1	(United Kingdom) Chamberlain Motorsport	(Portugal) Ni Amorim (South Africa) Stephen Watson	Chrysler Viper GTS-R	**MI**	38
29 DNF	GT	1	(United Kingdom) Chamberlain Motorsport	(Portugal) Ni Amorim (South Africa) Stephen Watson	Chrysler 8.0L V10	**MI**	38
30 DNF	GT	16	(Switzerland) First Racing	(Switzerland) Jean-Denis Délétraz (France) Fabien Giroix	Ferrari 550 Maranello	**D**	14
30 DNF	GT	16	(Switzerland) First Racing	(Switzerland) Jean-Denis Délétraz (France) Fabien Giroix	Ferrari 6.0L V12	**D**	14

== Statistics ==
- Pole position – #14 Lister Storm Racing – 1:33.635
- Fastest lap – #14 Lister Storm Racing – 1:33.951
- Average speed – 143.350 km/h

FIA GT Championship
Previous race: None	2000 season	Next race: 2000 FIA GT Estoril 500km
