= 2000 FIA GT Estoril 500km =

2000 FIA GT Estoril 500 km, 2nd round, occurred in Portugal

Layout of the Autódromo do Estoril

The 2000 FIA GT Estoril 500 km was the second round the 2000 FIA GT Championship season. It took place at the Autódromo do Estoril, Portugal, on April 2, 2000.

== Race ==
Following an initial start, the race came under a caution period on Lap 13 due to heavy rain. By Lap 23, the decision was made to stop the event due to worsening conditions. The rain did not relent and the race was not restarted.

Due to completing less than half of the planned 120 lap race distance, half-points were awarded in the championships. Also, since most teams did not have time to perform their required driver changes before the race was stopped, all assigned drivers were assigned points even if they never made it into the car.

== Official results ==
Class winners in bold. Cars failing to complete 70% of winner's distance marked as Not Classified (NC).

Pos	Class	No	Team	Drivers	Chassis	Tyre	Laps
Pos	Class	No	Team	Drivers	Engine	Tyre	Laps
1	**GT**	**14**	**(United Kingdom) Lister Storm Racing**	**(United Kingdom) Jamie Campbell-Walter (United Kingdom) Julian Bailey**	**Lister Storm**	**MI**	**23**
1	**GT**	**14**	**(United Kingdom) Lister Storm Racing**	**(United Kingdom) Jamie Campbell-Walter (United Kingdom) Julian Bailey**	**Jaguar 7.0L V12**	**MI**	**23**
2	GT	12	(France) Paul Belmondo Racing	(France) Paul Belmondo (Belgium) Vincent Vosse	Chrysler Viper GTS-R	**D**	23
2	GT	12	(France) Paul Belmondo Racing	(France) Paul Belmondo (Belgium) Vincent Vosse	Chrysler 8.0L V10	**D**	23
3	GT	11	(France) Paul Belmondo Racing	(France) Boris Derichebourg (France) Claude-Yves Gosselin	Chrysler Viper GTS-R	**D**	23
3	GT	11	(France) Paul Belmondo Racing	(France) Boris Derichebourg (France) Claude-Yves Gosselin	Chrysler 8.0L V10	**D**	23
4	GT	25	(Netherlands) Carsport Holland	(Netherlands) Mike Hezemans (Netherlands) David Hart	Chrysler Viper GTS-R	**MI**	23
4	GT	25	(Netherlands) Carsport Holland	(Netherlands) Mike Hezemans (Netherlands) David Hart	Chrysler 8.0L V10	**MI**	23
5	GT	1	(United Kingdom) Chamberlain Motorsport	(Portugal) Ni Amorim (South Africa) Stephen Watson	Chrysler Viper GTS-R	**MI**	23
5	GT	1	(United Kingdom) Chamberlain Motorsport	(Portugal) Ni Amorim (South Africa) Stephen Watson	Chrysler 8.0L V10	**MI**	23
6	GT	19	(Netherlands) Marcos Racing International	(Netherlands) Cor Euser (United Kingdom) Christian Vann	Marcos Mantara LM600	**D**	23
6	GT	19	(Netherlands) Marcos Racing International	(Netherlands) Cor Euser (United Kingdom) Christian Vann	Chevrolet 5.9L V8	**D**	23
7	GT	3	(Germany) Freisinger Motorsport	(France) Stéphane Ortelli (Germany) Wolfgang Kaufmann	Porsche 911 GT2	**D**	23
7	GT	3	(Germany) Freisinger Motorsport	(France) Stéphane Ortelli (Germany) Wolfgang Kaufmann	Porsche 3.8L Turbo Flat-6	**D**	23
8	**N-GT**	**52**	**(France) Larbre Compétition Chéreau**	**(France) Christophe Bouchut (France) Patrice Goueslard**	**Porsche 911 GT3-R**	**MI**	**23**
8	**N-GT**	**52**	**(France) Larbre Compétition Chéreau**	**(France) Christophe Bouchut (France) Patrice Goueslard**	**Porsche 3.6L Flat-6**	**MI**	**23**
9	GT	15	(United Kingdom) Lister Storm Racing	(United Kingdom) Peter Hardman (Germany) Nicolaus Springer (Switzerland) Philippe Favre	Lister Storm	**MI**	23
9	GT	15	(United Kingdom) Lister Storm Racing	(United Kingdom) Peter Hardman (Germany) Nicolaus Springer (Switzerland) Philippe Favre	Jaguar 7.0L V12	**MI**	23
10	N-GT	77	(Germany) RWS Red Bull Racing	(Italy) Luca Riccitelli (Austria) Hans-Jörg Hofer	Porsche 911 GT3-R	**MI**	23
10	N-GT	77	(Germany) RWS Red Bull Racing	(Italy) Luca Riccitelli (Austria) Hans-Jörg Hofer	Porsche 3.6L Flat-6	**MI**	23
11	N-GT	51	(United Kingdom) Pennzoil Quaker State G-Force	(United Kingdom) Nigel Smith (Belgium) Michel Neugarten	Porsche 911 GT3-R	**D**	23
11	N-GT	51	(United Kingdom) Pennzoil Quaker State G-Force	(United Kingdom) Nigel Smith (Belgium) Michel Neugarten	Porsche 3.6L Flat-6	**D**	23
12	N-GT	56	(United Kingdom) EMKA GTC	(United Kingdom) Steve O'Rourke (United Kingdom) Tim Sugden (United Kingdom) Stephen Day	Porsche 911 GT3-R	**P**	23
12	N-GT	56	(United Kingdom) EMKA GTC	(United Kingdom) Steve O'Rourke (United Kingdom) Tim Sugden (United Kingdom) Stephen Day	Porsche 3.6L Flat-6	**P**	23
13	GT	10	(France) Paul Belmondo Competition	(France) Jean-Claude Lagniez (France) Guy Martinolle	Chrysler Viper GTS-R	**D**	23
13	GT	10	(France) Paul Belmondo Competition	(France) Jean-Claude Lagniez (France) Guy Martinolle	Chrysler 8.0L V10	**D**	23
14	N-GT	50	(United Kingdom) Pennzoil Quaker State G-Force	(United Kingdom) Robert Nearn (Sweden) Magnus Wallinder	Porsche 911 GT3-R	**D**	23
14	N-GT	50	(United Kingdom) Pennzoil Quaker State G-Force	(United Kingdom) Robert Nearn (Sweden) Magnus Wallinder	Porsche 3.6L Flat-6	**D**	23
15	GT	2	(United Kingdom) Chamberlain Motorsport	(Switzerland) Walter Brun (Switzerland) Toni Seiler	Chrysler Viper GTS-R	**MI**	23
15	GT	2	(United Kingdom) Chamberlain Motorsport	(Switzerland) Walter Brun (Switzerland) Toni Seiler	Chrysler 8.0L V10	**MI**	23
16	N-GT	67	(Italy) MAC Racing	(Spain) Paco Orti (Spain) Luis Villamil	Porsche 911 GT3-R	**D**	23
16	N-GT	67	(Italy) MAC Racing	(Spain) Paco Orti (Spain) Luis Villamil	Porsche 3.6L Flat-6	**D**	23
17	GT	21	(Italy) Racing Box	(Italy) Luca Cappellari (Italy) Angelo Zadra (Italy) Gabriele Matteuzzi	Chrysler Viper GTS-R	**D**	23
17	GT	21	(Italy) Racing Box	(Italy) Luca Cappellari (Italy) Angelo Zadra (Italy) Gabriele Matteuzzi	Chrysler 8.0L V10	**D**	23
18	GT	4	(Germany) Freisinger Motorsport	(Germany) Ernst Palmberger (Japan) Yukihiro Hane	Porsche 911 GT2	**D**	23
18	GT	4	(Germany) Freisinger Motorsport	(Germany) Ernst Palmberger (Japan) Yukihiro Hane	Porsche 3.8L Turbo Flat-6	**D**	23
19	N-GT	53	(France) Larbre Compétition Chéreau	(France) Ferdinand de Lesseps (Germany) André Ahrlé	Porsche 911 GT3-R	**MI**	22
19	N-GT	53	(France) Larbre Compétition Chéreau	(France) Ferdinand de Lesseps (Germany) André Ahrlé	Porsche 3.6L Flat-6	**MI**	22
20	GT	28	(Germany) RWS	(Austria) Horst Felbermayr, Sr. (Austria) Horst Felbermayr, Jr.	Porsche 911 GT2	?	22
20	GT	28	(Germany) RWS	(Austria) Horst Felbermayr, Sr. (Austria) Horst Felbermayr, Jr.	Porsche 3.8L Turbo Flat-6	?	22
21	GT	36	(France) Estoril Racing	(Portugal) Manuel Monteiro (Portugal) Michel Monteiro	Porsche 911 GT2	**D**	22
21	GT	36	(France) Estoril Racing	(Portugal) Manuel Monteiro (Portugal) Michel Monteiro	Porsche 3.6L Turbo Flat-6	**D**	22
22	N-GT	66	(Italy) MAC Racing	(Italy) Massimo Frigerio (Italy) Paolo Rapetti	Porsche 911 GT3-R	**D**	22
22	N-GT	66	(Italy) MAC Racing	(Italy) Massimo Frigerio (Italy) Paolo Rapetti	Porsche 3.6L Flat-6	**D**	22
23	GT	32	(Germany) Seikel Motorsport	(France) Francis Werner (France) Jacques Piattier	Porsche 911 GT2	**D**	22
23	GT	32	(Germany) Seikel Motorsport	(France) Francis Werner (France) Jacques Piattier	Porsche 3.8L Turbo Flat-6	**D**	22
24	GT	27	(Italy) Autorlando	(Italy) Marco Spinelli (Italy) Fabio Villa	Porsche 911 GT2	**P**	22
24	GT	27	(Italy) Autorlando	(Italy) Marco Spinelli (Italy) Fabio Villa	Porsche 3.8L Turbo Flat-6	**P**	22
25	GT	8	(Switzerland) Haberthur Racing	(France) Patrick Vuillaume (Italy) Walter Meloni (Portugal) Nuno Mousinho Esteves	Porsche 911 GT2	**D**	22
25	GT	8	(Switzerland) Haberthur Racing	(France) Patrick Vuillaume (Italy) Walter Meloni (Portugal) Nuno Mousinho Esteves	Porsche 3.8L Turbo Flat-6	**D**	22
26	GT	7	(Germany) Proton Competition	(Germany) Gerold Ried (Germany) Christian Ried (Italy) Mauro Casadei	Porsche 911 GT2	**Y**	20
26	GT	7	(Germany) Proton Competition	(Germany) Gerold Ried (Germany) Christian Ried (Italy) Mauro Casadei	Porsche 3.6L Turbo Flat-6	**Y**	20
27	GT	5	(Germany) Konrad Motorsport	(Austria) Franz Konrad (Germany) Jürgen von Gartzen	Porsche 911 GT2	**D**	11
27	GT	5	(Germany) Konrad Motorsport	(Austria) Franz Konrad (Germany) Jürgen von Gartzen	Porsche 3.8L Turbo Flat-6	**D**	11
28	GT	22	(Germany) Wieth Racing	(Germany) Niko Wieth (Germany) Franz Wieth	Porsche 911 GT2	**D**	1
28	GT	22	(Germany) Wieth Racing	(Germany) Niko Wieth (Germany) Franz Wieth	Porsche 3.8L Turbo Flat-6	**D**	1

== Statistics ==
- Pole position – #14 Lister Storm Racing – 1:38.427
- Fastest lap – #12 Paul Belmondo Racing – 1:51.370
- Average speed – 105.880 km/h

FIA GT Championship
Previous race: 2000 FIA GT Valencia 500km	2000 season	Next race: 2000 FIA GT Monza 500km
