= 2000 FIA GT Championship =

Motor racing season

Seasons
- ← 1999 2001 →

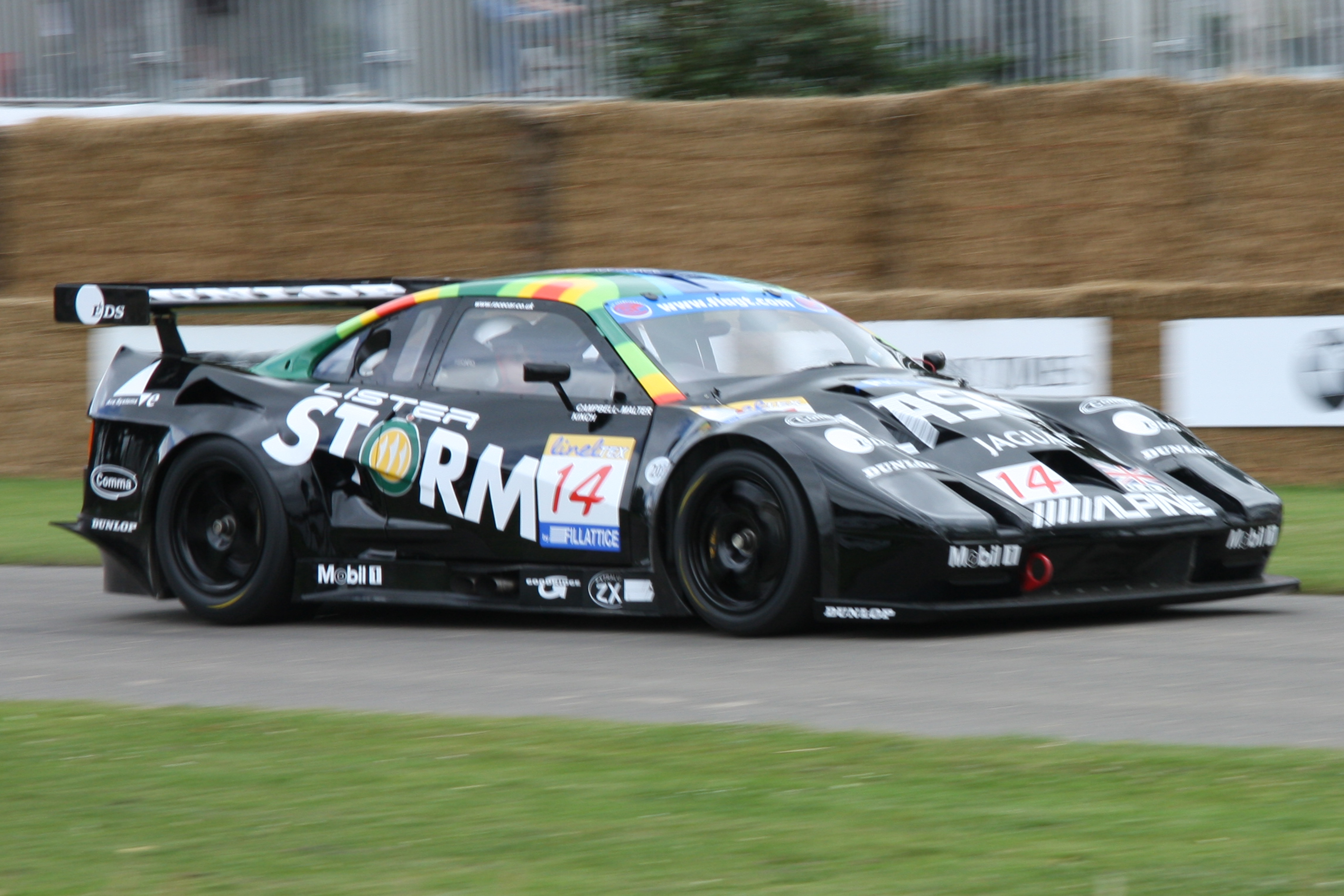
Lister won their only FIA GT Championship with the Lister Storm GTM (2003 version pictured)

The 2000 FIA GT Championship was the fourth FIA GT Championship, an auto racing series endorsed by the Fédération Internationale de l'Automobile (FIA) and organized by the Stéphane Ratel Organisation (SRO). The races featured grand touring cars divided into two categories, GT and N GT, with drivers and teams titles awarded for each category. The championship began on 26 March 2000 and ended 22 October 2000 after ten races, all held in Europe.

After the 1999 season featured just a single category of cars competing, the FIA GT Championship once again became a two-class series for 2000 with the introduction of the Group N-GT cars by the FIA. The new category was positioned below the former GT2 class of cars from 1997 to 1999, now renamed to just GT, and was awarded an FIA Cup instead of a full FIA Championship. Britons Julian Bailey and Jamie Campbell-Walter won the GT Drivers' Championship with five victories, in chassis number GTM 002 driving for the GT team champions Lister Storm Racing in their first full season of FIA GT competition. Christophe Bouchut and Patrice Goueslard were the inaugural N-GT Cup winners, driving for Teams title winners Larbre Compétition Chereau.

== Schedule ==
The FIA GT Championship became a European-only series for 2000, dropping all fly-away races in North America and Asia. The two German rounds at Hockenheimring and Oschersleben were replaced by a single race at EuroSpeedway Lausitz, while the A1-Ring returned to the series after a one-year absence. Valencia, Estoril, Brno, and Magny-Cours were all new events for the series. Donington Park was the only other European event not kept for 2000.

All events were held over a distance of 500 km (310 mi).

Rnd	Race	Circuit	Date
1	Valencia 500 km	Circuit de Valencia, Cheste, Spain	26 March
2	Estoril 500 km	Autódromo do Estoril, Estoril, Portugal	2 April
3	Monza 500 km	Autodromo Nazionale Monza, Monza, Italy	16 April
4	P&O Stena Line Silverstone 500x2	Silverstone Circuit, Silverstone, United Kingdom	14 May
5	MOL FIA GT Hungaroring	Hungaroring, Mogyoród, Hungary	2 July
6	Zolder 500 km	Zolder Circuit, Zolder, Belgium	23 July
7	500 km A1-Ring	A1-Ring, Spielberg, Austria	6 August
8	Lausitz 200	EuroSpeedway Lausitz, Klettwitz, Germany	2 September
9	Česká pojišťovna Racing Weekend	Autodrom Brno Masaryk, Brno, Czech Republic	17 September
10	Trophee Ecospace d'Automne	Circuit de Nevers Magny-Cours, Magny-Cours, France	22 October

== Entries ==
=== GT ===
Entrant	Car	Engine	Tyre	No.	Drivers	Rounds
(United Kingdom) Chamberlain Motorsport	Chrysler Viper GTS-R	Chrysler 356-T6 8.0 L V10	M	1	(South Africa) Stephen Watson	1–5
(United Kingdom) Chamberlain Motorsport	Chrysler Viper GTS-R	Chrysler 356-T6 8.0 L V10	M	1	(Portugal) Ni Amorim	1–2
(United Kingdom) Chamberlain Motorsport	Chrysler Viper GTS-R	Chrysler 356-T6 8.0 L V10	M	1	(France) Xavier Pompidou	3
(United Kingdom) Chamberlain Motorsport	Chrysler Viper GTS-R	Chrysler 356-T6 8.0 L V10	M	1	(Belgium) Didier Defourny	4
(United Kingdom) Chamberlain Motorsport	Chrysler Viper GTS-R	Chrysler 356-T6 8.0 L V10	M	1	(Hungary) Tamás Illés	5
(United Kingdom) Chamberlain Motorsport	Chrysler Viper GTS-R	Chrysler 356-T6 8.0 L V10	M	1	(Austria) Horst Felbermayr	7
(United Kingdom) Chamberlain Motorsport	Chrysler Viper GTS-R	Chrysler 356-T6 8.0 L V10	M	1	(Austria) Horst Felbermayr Jr.	7
(United Kingdom) Chamberlain Motorsport	Chrysler Viper GTS-R	Chrysler 356-T6 8.0 L V10	M	2	(Switzerland) Walter Brun	1–4, 8
(United Kingdom) Chamberlain Motorsport	Chrysler Viper GTS-R	Chrysler 356-T6 8.0 L V10	M	2	(Switzerland) Toni Seiler	1–4, 8
(Germany) Freisinger Motorsport	Porsche 911 GT2	Porsche 3.8 L Turbo Flat-6	D	3	(Germany) Wolfgang Kaufmann	All
(Germany) Freisinger Motorsport	Porsche 911 GT2	Porsche 3.8 L Turbo Flat-6	D	3	(France) Bob Wollek	1, 3, 5
(Germany) Freisinger Motorsport	Porsche 911 GT2	Porsche 3.8 L Turbo Flat-6	D	3	(Monaco) Stéphane Ortelli	2, 4
(Germany) Freisinger Motorsport	Porsche 911 GT2	Porsche 3.8 L Turbo Flat-6	D	3	(Belgium) Bert Longin	6
(Germany) Freisinger Motorsport	Porsche 911 GT2	Porsche 3.8 L Turbo Flat-6	D	3	(Austria) Gottfried Grasser	7
(Germany) Freisinger Motorsport	Porsche 911 GT2	Porsche 3.8 L Turbo Flat-6	D	3	(Germany) Hubert Haupt	8–9
(Germany) Freisinger Motorsport	Porsche 911 GT2	Porsche 3.8 L Turbo Flat-6	D	3	(Germany) Michael Trunk	10
(Germany) Freisinger Motorsport	Porsche 911 GT2	Porsche 3.8 L Turbo Flat-6	D	4	(Germany) Ernst Palmberger	All
(Germany) Freisinger Motorsport	Porsche 911 GT2	Porsche 3.8 L Turbo Flat-6	D	4	(Japan) Yukihiro Hane	1–8, 10
(Germany) Freisinger Motorsport	Porsche 911 GT2	Porsche 3.8 L Turbo Flat-6	D	4	(France) Cyril Chateau	9
(Germany) Konrad Motorsport	Porsche 911 GT2	Porsche 3.8 L Turbo Flat-6	D	5	(Austria) Franz Konrad	1–8
(Germany) Konrad Motorsport	Porsche 911 GT2	Porsche 3.8 L Turbo Flat-6	D	5	(Germany) Jürgen von Gartzen	1–8
(Germany) Konrad Motorsport	Porsche 911 GT2	Porsche 3.8 L Turbo Flat-6	D	6	(Austria) Manfred Jurasz	5
(Germany) Konrad Motorsport	Porsche 911 GT2	Porsche 3.8 L Turbo Flat-6	D	6	(Denmark) Kurt Thiel	5
(Germany) Proton Competition	Porsche 911 GT2	Porsche 3.6 L Turbo Flat-6	Y	7	(Germany) Gerold Ried	All
(Germany) Proton Competition	Porsche 911 GT2	Porsche 3.6 L Turbo Flat-6	Y	7	(Germany) Christian Ried	All
(Germany) Proton Competition	Porsche 911 GT2	Porsche 3.6 L Turbo Flat-6	Y	7	(Italy) Mauro Casadei	2, 4
(Germany) Proton Competition	Porsche 911 GT2	Porsche 3.6 L Turbo Flat-6	Y	7	(Italy) Renato Maestropietro	3
(Switzerland) Haberthur Racing	Porsche 911 GT2	Porsche 3.8 L Turbo Flat-6	D	8	(Italy) Mauro Casadei	1, 3, 6, 8–10
(Switzerland) Haberthur Racing	Porsche 911 GT2	Porsche 3.8 L Turbo Flat-6	D	8	(France) Michel Ligonnet	1
(Switzerland) Haberthur Racing	Porsche 911 GT2	Porsche 3.8 L Turbo Flat-6	D	8	(Spain) Alberto Costello	1
(Switzerland) Haberthur Racing	Porsche 911 GT2	Porsche 3.8 L Turbo Flat-6	D	8	(France) Patrick Vuillaume	2–4, 6, 10
(Switzerland) Haberthur Racing	Porsche 911 GT2	Porsche 3.8 L Turbo Flat-6	D	8	(Italy) Walter Meloni	2
(Switzerland) Haberthur Racing	Porsche 911 GT2	Porsche 3.8 L Turbo Flat-6	D	8	(Portugal) Nuno Mousinho Esteves	2
(Switzerland) Haberthur Racing	Porsche 911 GT2	Porsche 3.8 L Turbo Flat-6	D	8	(Switzerland) Riccardo Schmid	3
(Switzerland) Haberthur Racing	Porsche 911 GT2	Porsche 3.8 L Turbo Flat-6	D	8	(Austria) Manfred Jurasz	4, 9
(Switzerland) Haberthur Racing	Porsche 911 GT2	Porsche 3.8 L Turbo Flat-6	D	8	(Belgium) Erik Bruynoghe	6
(Switzerland) Haberthur Racing	Porsche 911 GT2	Porsche 3.8 L Turbo Flat-6	D	8	(Italy) Andrea Garbagnati	8
(Switzerland) Haberthur Racing	Porsche 911 GT2	Porsche 3.8 L Turbo Flat-6	D	8	(Italy) Roberto Orlandi	9
(Switzerland) Haberthur Racing	Porsche 911 GT2	Porsche 3.8 L Turbo Flat-6	D	9	(France) Jacques Corbet	1
(Switzerland) Haberthur Racing	Porsche 911 GT2	Porsche 3.8 L Turbo Flat-6	D	9	(France) Patrick Vuillaume	1
(Switzerland) Haberthur Racing	Porsche 911 GT2	Porsche 3.8 L Turbo Flat-6	D	9	(Spain) Paco Orti	1
(Switzerland) Haberthur Racing	Porsche 911 GT2	Porsche 3.8 L Turbo Flat-6	D	9	(Italy) Luca Cattaneo	3
(Switzerland) Haberthur Racing	Porsche 911 GT2	Porsche 3.8 L Turbo Flat-6	D	9	(Italy) Renato Premoli	3
(Switzerland) Haberthur Racing	Porsche 911 GT2	Porsche 3.8 L Turbo Flat-6	D	9	(Italy) Antonio De Castro	3
(France) Paul Belmondo Competition	Chrysler Viper GTS-R	Chrysler 356-T6 8.0 L V10	D	10	(France) Jean-Claude Lagniez	1–4
(France) Paul Belmondo Competition	Chrysler Viper GTS-R	Chrysler 356-T6 8.0 L V10	D	10	(France) Guy Martinolle	1–4
(France) Paul Belmondo Competition	Chrysler Viper GTS-R	Chrysler 356-T6 8.0 L V10	D	10	(France) Claude-Yves Gosselin	10
(France) Paul Belmondo Competition	Chrysler Viper GTS-R	Chrysler 356-T6 8.0 L V10	D	10	(Belgium) Anthony Kumpen	10
(France) Paul Belmondo Racing	Chrysler Viper GTS-R	Chrysler 356-T6 8.0 L V10	D	11	(France) Claude-Yves Gosselin	1–5, 7–9
(France) Paul Belmondo Racing	Chrysler Viper GTS-R	Chrysler 356-T6 8.0 L V10	D	11	(France) Boris Derichebourg	1–3
(France) Paul Belmondo Racing	Chrysler Viper GTS-R	Chrysler 356-T6 8.0 L V10	D	11	(France) Paul Belmondo	4–10
(France) Paul Belmondo Racing	Chrysler Viper GTS-R	Chrysler 356-T6 8.0 L V10	D	11	(Belgium) Marc Duez	6, 10
(France) Paul Belmondo Racing	Chrysler Viper GTS-R	Chrysler 356-T6 8.0 L V10	D	12	(Belgium) Vincent Vosse	1–6, 8–10
(France) Paul Belmondo Racing	Chrysler Viper GTS-R	Chrysler 356-T6 8.0 L V10	D	12	(France) Paul Belmondo	1–3
(France) Paul Belmondo Racing	Chrysler Viper GTS-R	Chrysler 356-T6 8.0 L V10	D	12	(France) Boris Derichebourg	4–10
(France) Paul Belmondo Racing	Chrysler Viper GTS-R	Chrysler 356-T6 8.0 L V10	D	12	(France) Emmanuel Clérico	7
(United Kingdom) Lister Storm Racing	Lister Storm GTM	Jaguar 7.0 L V12	M	14	(United Kingdom) Jamie Campbell-Walter	All
(United Kingdom) Lister Storm Racing	Lister Storm GTM	Jaguar 7.0 L V12	M	14	(United Kingdom) Julian Bailey	All
(United Kingdom) Lister Storm Racing	Lister Storm GTM	Jaguar 7.0 L V12	M	15	(Germany) Nicolaus Springer	All
(United Kingdom) Lister Storm Racing	Lister Storm GTM	Jaguar 7.0 L V12	M	15	(United Kingdom) Peter Hardman	1–3
(United Kingdom) Lister Storm Racing	Lister Storm GTM	Jaguar 7.0 L V12	M	15	(Spain) Carlos Palau	1
(United Kingdom) Lister Storm Racing	Lister Storm GTM	Jaguar 7.0 L V12	M	15	(Switzerland) Philippe Favre	2–5, 7–10
(United Kingdom) Lister Storm Racing	Lister Storm GTM	Jaguar 7.0 L V12	M	15	(United Kingdom) Tiff Needell	6
(Switzerland) First Racing	Ferrari 550 Millennio	Ferrari F133 6.0 L V12	D	16	(France) Fabien Giroix	1, 3, 6, 9–10
(Switzerland) First Racing	Ferrari 550 Millennio	Ferrari F133 6.0 L V12	D	16	(Switzerland) Jean-Denis Délétraz	1, 3, 6, 9–10
(Netherlands) Marcos Cars International	Marcos Mantara LM600EVO	Chevrolet 5.9 L V8	D	19	(Netherlands) Cor Euser	1–4, 6
(Netherlands) Marcos Cars International	Marcos Mantara LM600EVO	Chevrolet 5.9 L V8	D	19	(United Kingdom) Christian Vann	1–2
(Netherlands) Marcos Cars International	Marcos Mantara LM600EVO	Chevrolet 5.9 L V8	D	19	(Germany) Harald Becker	3–4, 6
(Netherlands) Marcos Cars International	Marcos Mantara LM600EVO	Chevrolet 5.9 L V8	D	19	(Netherlands) Herman Buurman	3
(Italy) Racing Box	Chrysler Viper GTS-R	Chrysler 356-T6 8.0 L V10	D	21	(Italy) Luca Cappellari	All
(Italy) Racing Box	Chrysler Viper GTS-R	Chrysler 356-T6 8.0 L V10	D	21	(Italy) Gabriele Matteuzzi	1–7, 9–10
(Italy) Racing Box	Chrysler Viper GTS-R	Chrysler 356-T6 8.0 L V10	D	21	(Italy) Raffaele Sangiuolo	1, 3–10
(Italy) Racing Box	Chrysler Viper GTS-R	Chrysler 356-T6 8.0 L V10	D	21	(Italy) Angelo Zadra	2
(Italy) Racing Box	Chrysler Viper GTS-R	Chrysler 356-T6 8.0 L V10	D	21	(Italy) Giorgio Tibaldo	8
(Germany) Wieth Racing	Porsche 911 GT2	Porsche 3.8 L Turbo Flat-6	D	22	(Germany) Niko Wieth	1–3, 5–10
(Germany) Wieth Racing	Porsche 911 GT2	Porsche 3.8 L Turbo Flat-6	D	22	(Germany) Franz Wieth	1–3, 5–10
(Germany) KRT Lamborghini Racing	Lamborghini Diablo GTR	Lamborghini 6.0 L V12	M	23	(Germany) Günther Kronsender	4–5, 7, 9
(Germany) KRT Lamborghini Racing	Lamborghini Diablo GTR	Lamborghini 6.0 L V12	M	23	(Germany) Josef Jobst	4–5, 7, 9
(Germany) Reiter Engineering	Lamborghini Diablo GTR	Lamborghini 6.0 L V12	M	24	(Germany) Michael Trunk	7–9
(Germany) Reiter Engineering	Lamborghini Diablo GTR	Lamborghini 6.0 L V12	M	24	(Germany) Bernhard Müller	7–9
(Netherlands) Carsport Holland	Chrysler Viper GTS-R	Chrysler 356-T6 8.0 L V10	M	25	(Netherlands) Mike Hezemans	All
(Netherlands) Carsport Holland	Chrysler Viper GTS-R	Chrysler 356-T6 8.0 L V10	M	25	(Netherlands) David Hart	1–6, 8–9
(Netherlands) Carsport Holland	Chrysler Viper GTS-R	Chrysler 356-T6 8.0 L V10	M	25	(Netherlands) Tom Coronel	7, 10
(Netherlands) Carsport Holland	Chrysler Viper GTS-R	Chrysler 356-T6 8.0 L V10	M	39	(Netherlands) David Hart	10
(Netherlands) Carsport Holland	Chrysler Viper GTS-R	Chrysler 356-T6 8.0 L V10	M	39	(Netherlands) Peter Kox	10
(Italy) Autorlando	Porsche 911 GT2	Porsche 3.8 L Turbo Flat-6	P	27	(Italy) Marco Spinelli	All
(Italy) Autorlando	Porsche 911 GT2	Porsche 3.8 L Turbo Flat-6	P	27	(Italy) Fabio Villa	1–6, 8–10
(Italy) Autorlando	Porsche 911 GT2	Porsche 3.8 L Turbo Flat-6	P	27	(Italy) Gabriele Sabatini	1, 3–10
(Italy) Autorlando	Porsche 911 GT2	Porsche 3.8 L Turbo Flat-6	P	27	(Austria) Manfred Jurasz	7
(Germany) RWS	Porsche 911 GT2	Porsche 3.6 L Turbo Flat-6		28	(Austria) Horst Felbermayr	1–3, 5
(Germany) RWS	Porsche 911 GT2	Porsche 3.6 L Turbo Flat-6		28	(Austria) Horst Felbermayr Jr.	1–3, 5
(France) Team ART	Chrysler Viper GTS-R	Chrysler 356-T6 8.0 L V10	M	29	(France) Jean-Pierre Jarier	3–4, 7
(France) Team ART	Chrysler Viper GTS-R	Chrysler 356-T6 8.0 L V10	M	29	(France) François Lafon	3–4, 7
(Germany) Seikel Motorsport	Porsche 911 GT2	Porsche 3.6 L Turbo Flat-6	D	32	(France) Francis Werner	1–2
(Germany) Seikel Motorsport	Porsche 911 GT2	Porsche 3.6 L Turbo Flat-6	D	32	(France) Jacques Piattier	1–2
(United Kingdom) Cirtek Motorsport	Porsche 911 GT2	Porsche 3.6 L Turbo Flat-6		33	(United Kingdom) Jonathan Baker	6
(United Kingdom) Cirtek Motorsport	Porsche 911 GT2	Porsche 3.6 L Turbo Flat-6		33	(Australia) Charlie Cox	6
(Portugal) Estoril Racing	Porsche 911 GT2	Porsche 3.6 L Turbo Flat-6	D	36	(France) Manuel Monteiro	2, 10
(Portugal) Estoril Racing	Porsche 911 GT2	Porsche 3.6 L Turbo Flat-6	D	36	(France) Michel Monteiro	2, 10
(Hungary) Bovi Motorsport	Porsche 911 GT2	Porsche 3.6 L Turbo Flat-6		37	(Hungary) Kálmán Bódis	5
(Hungary) Bovi Motorsport	Porsche 911 GT2	Porsche 3.6 L Turbo Flat-6		37	(Hungary) Attila Barta	5
(Hungary) Bovi Motorsport	Porsche 911 GT2	Porsche 3.6 L Turbo Flat-6		37	(Hungary) András Bakos	5
(Germany) Rupert Atzberger	Porsche 911 GT2	Porsche 3.6 L Turbo Flat-6		38	(Germany) Rupert Atzberger	10
(Germany) Rupert Atzberger	Porsche 911 GT2	Porsche 3.6 L Turbo Flat-6		38	(Germany) Siegfried Kaser	10
(United Kingdom) BVB Motorsport	Porsche 911 GT2	Porsche 3.8 L Turbo Flat-6	D	44	(United Kingdom) Geoff Lister	4
(United Kingdom) BVB Motorsport	Porsche 911 GT2	Porsche 3.8 L Turbo Flat-6	D	44	(United Kingdom) Max Beeverbroock	4
(Austria) Felbermayr	Chrysler Viper GTS-R	Chrysler 356-T6 8.0 L V10	M	45	(Austria) Horst Felbermayr	4
(Austria) Felbermayr	Chrysler Viper GTS-R	Chrysler 356-T6 8.0 L V10	M	45	(Austria) Horst Felbermayr Jr.	4

=== N-GT ===
Entrant	Car	Engine	Tyre	No.	Drivers	Rounds
(United Kingdom) Pennzoil Quaker State G-Force	Porsche 911 GT3-R	Porsche 3.6 L Flat-6	D	50	(Sweden) Magnus Wallinder	All
(United Kingdom) Pennzoil Quaker State G-Force	Porsche 911 GT3-R	Porsche 3.6 L Flat-6	D	50	(United Kingdom) Robert Nearn	1–4
(United Kingdom) Pennzoil Quaker State G-Force	Porsche 911 GT3-R	Porsche 3.6 L Flat-6	D	50	(United Kingdom) Nigel Smith	5–10
(United Kingdom) Pennzoil Quaker State G-Force	Porsche 911 GT3-R	Porsche 3.6 L Flat-6	D	51	(Belgium) Michel Neugarten	1–6
(United Kingdom) Pennzoil Quaker State G-Force	Porsche 911 GT3-R	Porsche 3.6 L Flat-6	D	51	(United Kingdom) Nigel Smith	1–4
(United Kingdom) Pennzoil Quaker State G-Force	Porsche 911 GT3-R	Porsche 3.6 L Flat-6	D	51	(United Kingdom) Robert Nearn	5–10
(United Kingdom) Pennzoil Quaker State G-Force	Porsche 911 GT3-R	Porsche 3.6 L Flat-6	D	51	(Monaco) Stéphane Ortelli	7
(United Kingdom) Pennzoil Quaker State G-Force	Porsche 911 GT3-R	Porsche 3.6 L Flat-6	D	51	(Belgium) Hans Willems	8
(United Kingdom) Pennzoil Quaker State G-Force	Porsche 911 GT3-R	Porsche 3.6 L Flat-6	D	51	(United Kingdom) Geoff Lister	9–10
(France) Larbre Compétition Chereau	Porsche 911 GT3-R	Porsche 3.6 L Flat-6	M	52	(France) Christophe Bouchut	All
(France) Larbre Compétition Chereau	Porsche 911 GT3-R	Porsche 3.6 L Flat-6	M	52	(France) Patrice Goueslard	All
(France) Larbre Compétition Chereau	Porsche 911 GT3-R	Porsche 3.6 L Flat-6	M	53	(France) Ferdinand de Lesseps	1–4, 6–10
(France) Larbre Compétition Chereau	Porsche 911 GT3-R	Porsche 3.6 L Flat-6	M	53	(France) Jean-Luc Chéreau	1, 3–6, 10
(France) Larbre Compétition Chereau	Porsche 911 GT3-R	Porsche 3.6 L Flat-6	M	53	(Germany) André Ahrlé	2–3, 5–10
(France) Larbre Compétition Chereau	Porsche 911 GT3-R	Porsche 3.6 L Flat-6	M	53	(France) Sébastien Bourdais	5
(France) Noël del Bello Racing	Porsche 911 GT3-R	Porsche 3.6 L Flat-6	D	54	(France) Jean-Luc Maury-Laribiére	1, 3
(France) Noël del Bello Racing	Porsche 911 GT3-R	Porsche 3.6 L Flat-6	D	54	(France) Marc Sourd	1
(France) Noël del Bello Racing	Porsche 911 GT3-R	Porsche 3.6 L Flat-6	D	54	(France) Bernard Chauvin	1
(France) Noël del Bello Racing	Porsche 911 GT3-R	Porsche 3.6 L Flat-6	D	54	(France) Patrick Caternet	3
(France) Noël del Bello Racing	Porsche 911 GT3-R	Porsche 3.6 L Flat-6	D	54	(France) Jacques Corbet	3
(Italy) ART Engineering	Porsche 911 GT3-R	Porsche 3.6 L Flat-6	P	55	(Italy) Constantino Bertuzzi	3–9
(Italy) ART Engineering	Porsche 911 GT3-R	Porsche 3.6 L Flat-6	P	55	(Italy) Pierangelo Masselli	3–9
(Italy) ART Engineering	Porsche 911 GT3-R	Porsche 3.6 L Flat-6	P	55	(Italy) Franco Bertoli	10
(Italy) ART Engineering	Porsche 911 GT3-R	Porsche 3.6 L Flat-6	P	55	(Italy) Paolo Rapetti	10
(Italy) ART Engineering	Porsche 911 GT3-R	Porsche 3.6 L Flat-6	P	57	(Italy) Fabio Mancini	7–8, 10
(Italy) ART Engineering	Porsche 911 GT3-R	Porsche 3.6 L Flat-6	P	57	(Italy) Gianni Collini	7–8, 10
(Italy) ART Engineering	Porsche 911 GT3-R	Porsche 3.6 L Flat-6	P	57	(Italy) Franco Bertoli	9
(Italy) ART Engineering	Porsche 911 GT3-R	Porsche 3.6 L Flat-6	P	57	(Italy) Paolo Rapetti	9
(United Kingdom) EMKA GTC	Porsche 911 GT3-R	Porsche 3.6 L Flat-6	P	56	(United Kingdom) Steve O'Rourke	1–8, 10
(United Kingdom) EMKA GTC	Porsche 911 GT3-R	Porsche 3.6 L Flat-6	P	56	(United Kingdom) Tim Sugden	1–8, 10
(United Kingdom) EMKA GTC	Porsche 911 GT3-R	Porsche 3.6 L Flat-6	P	56	(United Kingdom) Stephen Day	2
(Germany) Freisinger Motorsport	Porsche 911 GT3-R	Porsche 3.6 L Flat-6	D	58	(Russia) Nikolai Fomenko	8, 10
(Germany) Freisinger Motorsport	Porsche 911 GT3-R	Porsche 3.6 L Flat-6	D	58	(Russia) Aleksey Vasilyev	8, 10
(Switzerland) Haberthur Racing	Porsche 911 GT3-R	Porsche 3.6 L Flat-6	P	60	(Italy) Fabio Babini	3
(Switzerland) Haberthur Racing	Porsche 911 GT3-R	Porsche 3.6 L Flat-6	P	60	(Italy) Fabio Rosa	3
(Switzerland) Haberthur Racing	Porsche 911 GT3-R	Porsche 3.6 L Flat-6	P	60	(France) Michel Ligonnet	8–10
(Switzerland) Haberthur Racing	Porsche 911 GT3-R	Porsche 3.6 L Flat-6	P	60	(Belgium) Michel Neugarten	8–9
(Switzerland) Haberthur Racing	Porsche 911 GT3-R	Porsche 3.6 L Flat-6	P	60	(France) Jean-Charles Cartier	10
(Italy) Supertech erg	Ferrari 360 Modena	Ferrari 3.6 L V8	P	61	(Italy) Erich Prinoth	3
(Italy) Supertech erg	Ferrari 360 Modena	Ferrari 3.6 L V8	P	61	(Italy) Ivan Capelli	3
(Switzerland) LRO	Porsche 911 GT3-R	Porsche 3.6 L Flat-6	M	63	(Italy) Franco Bugané	3
(Switzerland) LRO	Porsche 911 GT3-R	Porsche 3.6 L Flat-6	M	63	(France) François Migault	3
(Switzerland) LRO	Porsche 911 GT3-R	Porsche 3.6 L Flat-6	M	63	(Canada) "Raël"	3
(Switzerland) LRO	Porsche 911 GT3-R	Porsche 3.6 L Flat-6	M	63	(France) Michel Ligonnet	4
(Switzerland) LRO	Porsche 911 GT3-R	Porsche 3.6 L Flat-6	M	63	(Belgium) Christophe d'Ansembourg	4
(Switzerland) LRO	Porsche 911 GT3-R	Porsche 3.6 L Flat-6	M	63	(Belgium) Stanislas De Sadeleer	4
(France) Perspective Racing	Porsche 911 GT3-R	Porsche 3.6 L Flat-6	P	64	(France) Thierry Perrier	1, 10
(France) Perspective Racing	Porsche 911 GT3-R	Porsche 3.6 L Flat-6	P	64	(France) Jean-Paul Richard	1, 10
(France) Perspective Racing	Porsche 911 GT3-R	Porsche 3.6 L Flat-6	P	64	(France) Gérard Larrousse	1
(France) Perspective Racing	Porsche 911 GT3-R	Porsche 3.6 L Flat-6	P	64	(Belgium) Michel Neugarten	10
(Italy) MAC Racing	Porsche 911 GT3-R	Porsche 3.6 L Flat-6	D	66	(Italy) Paolo Rapetti	1–3, 5–6
(Italy) MAC Racing	Porsche 911 GT3-R	Porsche 3.6 L Flat-6	D	66	(Italy) Massimo Frigerio	1–3, 5, 7
(Italy) MAC Racing	Porsche 911 GT3-R	Porsche 3.6 L Flat-6	D	66	(Switzerland) Massimo Cattori	6
(Italy) MAC Racing	Porsche 911 GT3-R	Porsche 3.6 L Flat-6	D	66	(Belgium) Michel Neugarten	7
(Italy) MAC Racing	Porsche 911 GT3-R	Porsche 3.6 L Flat-6	D	66	(Italy) Renato Biciato	7
(Italy) MAC Racing	Porsche 911 GT3-R	Porsche 3.6 L Flat-6	D	67	(Spain) Paco Orti	2
(Italy) MAC Racing	Porsche 911 GT3-R	Porsche 3.6 L Flat-6	D	67	(Spain) Luis Villamil	2
(Italy) MAC Racing	Porsche 911 GT3-R	Porsche 3.6 L Flat-6	D	67	(Italy) Roberto Orlandi	3, 8
(Italy) MAC Racing	Porsche 911 GT3-R	Porsche 3.6 L Flat-6	D	67	(Italy) Renato Biciato	3
(Italy) MAC Racing	Porsche 911 GT3-R	Porsche 3.6 L Flat-6	D	67	(Italy) Fabio Mancini	4–6
(Italy) MAC Racing	Porsche 911 GT3-R	Porsche 3.6 L Flat-6	D	67	(Italy) Gianni Collini	4–6
(Italy) MAC Racing	Porsche 911 GT3-R	Porsche 3.6 L Flat-6	D	67	(Italy) Paolo Rapetti	8
(Germany) Seikel Motorsport	Porsche 911 GT3-R	Porsche 3.6 L Flat-6	D	68	(Canada) Tony Burgess	4
(Germany) Seikel Motorsport	Porsche 911 GT3-R	Porsche 3.6 L Flat-6	D	68	(Morocco) Max Cohen-Olivar	4
(France) JMB Competition	Ferrari 360 Modena N-GT	Ferrari 3.6 L V8	P	70	(Italy) Marco Lambertini	3–4, 6, 10
(France) JMB Competition	Ferrari 360 Modena N-GT	Ferrari 3.6 L V8	P	70	(Italy) Batti Pregliasco	3–4, 6, 10
(France) JMB Competition	Ferrari 360 Modena N-GT	Ferrari 3.6 L V8	P	70	(Italy) Christian Pescatori	6, 10
(France) JMB Competition	Ferrari 360 Modena N-GT	Ferrari 3.6 L V8	P	71	(France) Philippe Alliot	4, 6, 10
(France) JMB Competition	Ferrari 360 Modena N-GT	Ferrari 3.6 L V8	P	71	(Netherlands) Peter Kutemann	4, 6, 10
(Switzerland) Loris Kessel Racing	Ferrari 360 Modena N-GT	Ferrari 3.6 L V8	P	75	(Switzerland) Loris Kessel	3
(Switzerland) Loris Kessel Racing	Ferrari 360 Modena N-GT	Ferrari 3.6 L V8	P	75	(Italy) Andrea Garbagnati	3
(Switzerland) Loris Kessel Racing	Ferrari 360 Modena N-GT	Ferrari 3.6 L V8	P	75	(Italy) Paolo Ligresti	3
(Germany) RWS / Red Bull Racing	Porsche 911 GT3-R	Porsche 3.6 L Flat-6	M	77	(Italy) Luca Riccitelli	All
(Germany) RWS / Red Bull Racing	Porsche 911 GT3-R	Porsche 3.6 L Flat-6	M	77	(Austria) Hans-Jörg Hofer	1–3
(Germany) RWS / Red Bull Racing	Porsche 911 GT3-R	Porsche 3.6 L Flat-6	M	77	(Belgium) Hans Willems	1, 3–6
(Germany) RWS / Red Bull Racing	Porsche 911 GT3-R	Porsche 3.6 L Flat-6	M	77	(Austria) Dieter Quester	7–10
(Germany) RWS / Red Bull Racing	Porsche 911 GT3-R	Porsche 3.6 L Flat-6	M	79	(Austria) Hans-Jörg Hofer	5–10
(Germany) RWS / Red Bull Racing	Porsche 911 GT3-R	Porsche 3.6 L Flat-6	M	79	(Austria) Philipp Peter	5
(Germany) RWS / Red Bull Racing	Porsche 911 GT3-R	Porsche 3.6 L Flat-6	M	79	(Austria) Dieter Quester	5
(Germany) RWS / Red Bull Racing	Porsche 911 GT3-R	Porsche 3.6 L Flat-6	M	79	(Italy) Giorgio Tibaldo	6
(Germany) RWS / Red Bull Racing	Porsche 911 GT3-R	Porsche 3.6 L Flat-6	M	79	(Belgium) Hans Willems	7
(Germany) RWS / Red Bull Racing	Porsche 911 GT3-R	Porsche 3.6 L Flat-6	M	79	(Germany) Günther Blieninger	7
(Germany) RWS / Red Bull Racing	Porsche 911 GT3-R	Porsche 3.6 L Flat-6	M	79	(Netherlands) Patrick Huisman	8
(Germany) RWS / Red Bull Racing	Porsche 911 GT3-R	Porsche 3.6 L Flat-6	M	79	(France) Bob Wollek	9–10
(United Kingdom) Cirtek Motorsport	Porsche 911 GT3-R	Porsche 3.6 L Flat-6		78	(United Kingdom) Paul Phillips	4
(United Kingdom) Cirtek Motorsport	Porsche 911 GT3-R	Porsche 3.6 L Flat-6		78	(United Kingdom) Adam Topping	4
(United Kingdom) Cirtek Motorsport	Porsche 911 GT3-R	Porsche 3.6 L Flat-6		78	(United Kingdom) Robert Schirle	4
(United Kingdom) Cirtek Motorsport	Porsche 911 GT3-R	Porsche 3.6 L Flat-6		78	(United Kingdom) Adam Simmons	6
(United Kingdom) Cirtek Motorsport	Porsche 911 GT3-R	Porsche 3.6 L Flat-6		78	(United Kingdom) Ian Gibbons	6
(United Kingdom) Cirtek Motorsport	Porsche 911 GT3-R	Porsche 3.6 L Flat-6		78	(Germany) Jürgen Lorenz	6

== Results and standings ==
=== Race results ===
Rnd	Circuit	GT Winning Team	N-GT Winning Team	Report
Rnd	Circuit	GT Winning Drivers	N-GT Winning Drivers	Report
1	Valencia	(United Kingdom) No. 14 Lister Storm Racing	(France) No. 52 Larbre Compétition Chereau	Report
1	Valencia	(United Kingdom) Julian Bailey (United Kingdom) Jamie Campbell-Walter	(France) Patrice Goueslard (France) Christophe Bouchut	Report
2	Estoril	(United Kingdom) No. 14 Lister Storm Racing	(France) No. 52 Larbre Compétition	Report
2	Estoril	(United Kingdom) Julian Bailey (United Kingdom) Jamie Campbell-Walter	(France) Patrice Goueslard (France) Christophe Bouchut	Report
3	Monza	(Netherlands) No. 25 Carsport Holland	(United Kingdom) No. 51 Pennzoil Quaker State G-Force	Report
3	Monza	(Netherlands) Mike Hezemans (Netherlands) David Hart	(Belgium) Michel Neugarten (United Kingdom) Nigel Smith	Report
4	Silverstone	(United Kingdom) No. 14 Lister Storm Racing	(France) No. 52 Larbre Compétition Chereau	Report
4	Silverstone	(United Kingdom) Julian Bailey (United Kingdom) Jamie Campbell-Walter	(France) Patrice Goueslard (France) Christophe Bouchut	Report
5	Hungaroring	(France) No. 12 Paul Belmondo Racing	(France) No. 52 Larbre Compétition Chereau	Report
5	Hungaroring	(France) Boris Derichebourg (Belgium) Vincent Vosse	(France) Patrice Goueslard (France) Christophe Bouchut	Report
6	Zolder	(United Kingdom) No. 14 Lister Storm Racing	(Germany) No. 77 RWS / Red Bull Racing	Report
6	Zolder	(United Kingdom) Julian Bailey (United Kingdom) Jamie Campbell-Walter	(Italy) Luca Riccitelli (Belgium) Hans Willems	Report
7	A1-Ring	(Netherlands) No. 25 Carsport Holland	(Italy) No. 57 ART Engineering	Report
7	A1-Ring	(Netherlands) Mike Hezemans (Netherlands) Tom Coronel	(Italy) Fabio Macini (Italy) Giovanni Collini	Report
8	Lausitzring	(Germany) No. 3 Freisinger Motorsport	(Germany) No. 77 RWS / Red Bull Racing	Report
8	Lausitzring	(Germany) Wolfgang Kaufmann (Germany) Hubert Haupt	(Italy) Luca Riccitelli (Austria) Dieter Quester	Report
9	Brno	(Netherlands) No. 25 Carsport Holland	(France) No. 52 Larbre Compétition Chereau	Report
9	Brno	(Netherlands) Mike Hezemans (Netherlands) David Hart	(France) Patrice Goueslard (France) Christophe Bouchut	Report
10	Magny-Cours	(United Kingdom) No. 14 Lister Storm Racing	(France) No. 52 Larbre Compétition Chereau	Report
10	Magny-Cours	(United Kingdom) Julian Bailey (United Kingdom) Jamie Campbell-Walter	(France) Patrice Goueslard (France) Christophe Bouchut	Report

Points were awarded to the top six finishers in each category. Cars were required to complete at least 70% of the laps covered by the winning car in order to be classified as a finisher. Drivers were required to complete 20% of the distance covered by their car to earn points. Teams titles were awarded based on all the results obtained by a maximum of two cars per team.

Points system
1st	2nd	3rd	4th	5th	6th
10	6	4	3	2	1

Due to the Estoril round being abandoned before 75% of the race distance was completed, half points were awarded to the top six teams and drivers.

=== Driver championships ===
==== GT Championship ====
Pos.	Driver	Team	VAL (Spain)	EST (Portugal)	MON (Italy)	SIL (United Kingdom)	HUN (Hungary)	ZOL (Belgium)	A1R (Austria)	LAU (Germany)	BRN (Czech Republic)	MAG (France)	Total points
1	(United Kingdom) Julian Bailey	(United Kingdom) Lister Storm Racing	1	1	3	1	Ret	1	Ret	3	2	1	59
1	(United Kingdom) Jamie Campbell-Walter	(United Kingdom) Lister Storm Racing	1	1	3	1	Ret	1	Ret	3	2	1	59
2	(Netherlands) Mike Hezemans	(Netherlands) Carsport Holland	4	4	1	2	6	Ret	1	4	1	2	50.5
3	(France) Boris Derichebourg	(France) Paul Belmondo Racing	3	3	Ret	Ret	1	2	2	2	4	Ret	37
4	(Netherlands) David Hart	(Netherlands) Carsport Holland	4	4	1	2	6	Ret		4	1	Ret	34.5
5	(Belgium) Vincent Vosse	(France) Paul Belmondo Racing	2	2	Ret	Ret	1	2		2	4	Ret	34
6	(Germany) Wolfgang Kaufmann	(Germany) Freisinger Motorsport	Ret	7	2	Ret	7	4	3	1	5	6	26
7	(France) Paul Belmondo	(France) Paul Belmondo Racing	2	2	Ret	3	Ret	3	4	7	6	3	25
8	(France) Claude-Yves Gosselin	(France) Paul Belmondo Racing	3	3	Ret	3	Ret		4	7	6		17
8	(France) Claude-Yves Gosselin	(France) Paul Belmondo Competition										4	17
9	(Netherlands) Tom Coronel	(Netherlands) Carsport Holland							1			2	16
10	(Germany) Nicolaus Springer	(United Kingdom) Lister Storm Racing	Ret	8	Ret	8	2	Ret	Ret	6	3	5	13
10	(Switzerland) Philippe Favre	(United Kingdom) Lister Storm Racing		8	Ret	8	2		Ret	6	3	5	13
11	(Germany) Hubert Haupt	(Germany) Freisinger Motorsport								1	5		12
12	(Belgium) Marc Duez	(France) Paul Belmondo Racing						3				3	8
13	(South Africa) Stephen Watson	(United Kingdom) Chamberlain Motorsport	Ret	5	DNS	4	3						8
14	(Austria) Franz Konrad	(Germany) Konrad Motorsport	8	Ret	Ret	6	5	11	5	5			7
14	(Germany) Jürgen von Gartzen	(Germany) Konrad Motorsport	8	Ret	Ret	6	5	11	5	5			7
15	(France) Bob Wollek	(Germany) Freisinger Motorsport	Ret		2		7						6
16	(France) Emmanuel Clérico	(France) Paul Belmondo Racing							2				6
17	(Germany) Ernst Palmberger	(Germany) Freisinger Motorsport	5	12	Ret	DNS	4	6	Ret	12	7	Ret	6
18	(Japan) Yukihiro Hane	(Germany) Freisinger Motorsport	5	12	Ret	DNS	4	6	Ret	12		Ret	6
19	(Hungary) Tamás Illés	(United Kingdom) Chamberlain Motorsport					3						4
19	(Austria) Gottfried Grasser	(Germany) Freisinger Motorsport							3				4
20	(Switzerland) Walter Brun	(United Kingdom) Chamberlain Motorsport	6	10	4	7				DSQ			4
20	(Switzerland) Toni Seiler	(United Kingdom) Chamberlain Motorsport	6	10	4	7				DSQ			4
21	(Belgium) Didier Defourney	(United Kingdom) Chamberlain Motorsport				4							3
21	(Belgium) Bert Longin	(Germany) Freisinger Motorsport						4					3
21	(Belgium) Anthony Kumpen	(France) Paul Belmondo Competition										4	3
22	(France) Guy Martinolle	(France) Paul Belmondo Competition	7	9	6	5							3
22	(France) Jean-Claude Lagniez	(France) Paul Belmondo Competition	7	9	6	5							3
23	(Netherlands) Cor Euser	(Netherlands) Marcos Racing International	Ret	6	Ret	DNS		5					2.5
24	(France) Jean-Pierre Jarier	(France) Team ART			5	9			Ret				2
24	(France) François Lafon	(France) Team ART			5	9			Ret				2
25	(Germany) Harald Becker	(Netherlands) Marcos Racing International			Ret	DNS		5					2
26	(Portugal) Ni Amorim	(United Kingdom) Chamberlain Motorsport	Ret	5									1
27	(Germany) Niko Wieth	(Germany) Wieth Racing	15	Ret	Ret		10	Ret	6	NC	8	7	1
27	(Germany) Franz Wieth	(Germany) Wieth Racing	15	Ret	Ret		10	Ret	6	NC	8	7	1
28	(Germany) Michael Trunk	(Germany) Reiter Engineering							Ret	9	Ret		1
28	(Germany) Michael Trunk	(Germany) Freisinger Motorsport										6	1
29	(United Kingdom) Christian Vann	(Netherlands) Marcos Racing International	Ret	6									0.5
Pos.	Driver	Team	VAL (Spain)	EST (Portugal)	MON (Italy)	SIL (United Kingdom)	HUN (Hungary)	ZOL (Belgium)	A1R (Austria)	LAU (Germany)	BRN (Czech Republic)	MAG (France)	Total points

Colour	Result
Gold	Winner
Silver	Second place
Bronze	Third place
Green	Points classification
Blue	Non-points classification
Blue	Non-classified finish (NC)
Purple	Retired, not classified (Ret)
Red	Did not qualify (DNQ)
Red	Did not pre-qualify (DNPQ)
Black	Disqualified (DSQ)
White	Did not start (DNS)
White	Withdrew (WD)
White	Race cancelled (C)
Blank	Did not practice (DNP)
Blank	Did not arrive (DNA)
Blank	Excluded (EX)

==== N-GT Cup ====
Pos.	Driver	Team	VAL (Spain)	EST (Portugal)	MON (Italy)	SIL (United Kingdom)	HUN (Hungary)	ZOL (Belgium)	A1R (Austria)	LAU (Germany)	BRN (Czech Republic)	MAG (France)	Total points
1	(France) Christophe Bouchut	(France) Larbre Compétition Chereau	1	1	3	1	1	2	6	2	1	1	72
1	(France) Patrice Goueslard	(France) Larbre Compétition Chereau	1	1	3	1	1	2	6	2	1	1	72
2	(Italy) Luca Riccitelli	(Germany) RWS / Red Bull Racing	5	2	Ret	2	Ret	1	Ret	1	2	2	43
3	(Belgium) Michel Neugarten	(United Kingdom) Pennzoil Quaker State G-Force	8	3	1	3	2	3					33
3	(Belgium) Michel Neugarten	(Italy) MAC Racing							5				33
3	(Belgium) Michel Neugarten	(Switzerland) Haberthur Racing								Ret	5		33
3	(Belgium) Michel Neugarten	(France) Perspective Racing										4	33
4	(United Kingdom) Nigel Smith	(United Kingdom) Pennzoil Quaker State G-Force	8	3	1	3	3	4	Ret	3	Ret	3	31
5	(Austria) Dieter Quester	(Germany) RWS / Red Bull Racing					4		Ret	1	2	2	25
6	(Sweden) Magnus Wallinder	(United Kingdom) Pennzoil Quaker State G-Force	2	5	Ret	4	3	4	Ret	3	Ret	3	25
7	(United Kingdom) Tim Sugden	(United Kingdom) EMKA GTC	3	4	2	12	5	NC	2	4		Ret	22.5
7	(United Kingdom) Steve O'Rourke	(United Kingdom) EMKA GTC	3	4	2	12	5	NC	2	4		Ret	22.5
8	(Belgium) Hans Willems	(Germany) RWS / Red Bull Racing	5		Ret	2	Ret	1	3				22
8	(Belgium) Hans Willems	(United Kingdom) Pennzoil Quaker State G-Force								8			22
9	(United Kingdom) Robert Nearn	(United Kingdom) Pennzoil Quaker State G-Force	2	5	Ret	4	2	3	Ret	8	Ret	Ret	20
10	(Austria) Hans-Jörg Hofer	(Germany) RWS / Red Bull Racing	5	2	Ret		4	Ret	3	5	4	5	19
11	(France) Ferdinand de Lesseps	(France) Larbre Compétition Chereau	4	7	5	5		5	4	6	3	9	17
12	(Italy) Fabio Mancini	(Italy) MAC Racing				8	6	6					12
12	(Italy) Fabio Mancini	(Italy) ART Engineering							1	10		8	12
12	(Italy) Gianni Collini	(Italy) MAC Racing				8	6	6					12
12	(Italy) Gianni Collini	(Italy) ART Engineering							1	10		8	12
13	(Germany) André Ahrlé	(France) Larbre Compétition Chereau		7	5		Ret	5	4	6	3	9	12
14	(France) Jean-Luc Chéreau	(France) Larbre Compétition Chereau	4		5	5	Ret	5				9	9
15	(France) Bob Wollek	(Germany) RWS / Red Bull Racing									4	5	5
16	(Italy) Pierangelo Masselli	(Italy) ART Engineering			4	6	Ret	Ret	Ret	7	6		5
16	(Italy) Constantino Bertuzzi	(Italy) ART Engineering			4	6	Ret	Ret	Ret	7	6		5
17	(Germany) Günther Blieninger	(Germany) RWS / Red Bull Racing							3				4
18	(France) Thierry Perrier	(France) Perspective Racing	6									4	4
18	(France) Jean-Luc Richard	(France) Perspective Racing	6									4	4
19	(Austria) Philipp Peter	(Germany) RWS / Red Bull Racing					4						3
20	(Italy) Massimo Frigerio	(Italy) MAC Racing	7	8	6		7		5				3
21	(France) Michel Ligonnet	(Switzerland) LRO				11							3
21	(France) Michel Ligonnet	(Switzerland) Haberthur Racing								Ret	5	6	3
22	(Italy) Renato Biciato	(Italy) MAC Racing			8				5				2
23	(Netherlands) Patrick Huisman	(Germany) RWS / Red Bull Racing								5			2
24	(Italy) Paolo Rapetti	(Italy) MAC Racing	7	8	6		7	Ret		9			1
24	(Italy) Paolo Rapetti	(Italy) ART Engineering									7	7	1
25	(France) Jean-Charles Cartier	(Switzerland) Haberthur Racing										6	1
26	(Spain) Paco Orti	(Italy) MAC Racing		6									0.5
26	(Spain) Luis Villamil	(Italy) MAC Racing		6									0.5
Pos.	Driver	Team	VAL (Spain)	EST (Portugal)	MON (Italy)	SIL (United Kingdom)	HUN (Hungary)	ZOL (Belgium)	A1R (Austria)	LAU (Germany)	BRN (Czech Republic)	MAG (France)	Total points

=== Team championships ===
==== GT Championship ====
Pos.	Team	VAL (Spain)	EST (Portugal)	MON (Italy)	SIL (United Kingdom)	HUN (Hungary)	ZOL (Belgium)	A1R (Austria)	LAU (Germany)	BRN (Czech Republic)	MAG (France)	Total points
1	(United Kingdom) Lister Storm Racing	1	1	3	1	2	1	Ret	3	2	1	72
1	(United Kingdom) Lister Storm Racing	Ret	8	Ret	8	Ret	Ret	Ret	6	3	5	72
2	(France) Paul Belmondo Racing	2	2	Ret	3	1	2	2	2	4	3	62
2	(France) Paul Belmondo Racing	3	3	Ret	Ret	Ret	3	4	7	6	Ret	62
3	(Netherlands) Carsport Holland	4	4	1	2	6	Ret	1	4	1	2	50.5
3	(Netherlands) Carsport Holland										Ret	50.5
4	(Germany) Freisinger Motorsport	5	8	2	Ret	4	4	3	1	5	6	32
4	(Germany) Freisinger Motorsport	Ret	12	Ret	Ret	7	6	Ret	12	7	Ret	32
5	(United Kingdom) Chamberlain Motorsport	6	5	4	4	3		7	DSQ			12
5	(United Kingdom) Chamberlain Motorsport	Ret	10	DNS	7							12
6	(France) Paul Belmondo Competition	7	9	6	5						4	6
7	(Germany) Konrad Motorsport	8	Ret	Ret	6	5	11	5	5			6
7	(Germany) Konrad Motorsport					9						6
8	(Netherlands) Marcos Racing International	Ret	6	Ret	DNS		5					2.5
9	(France) Team ART			5	9			Ret				2
10	(Germany) Wieth Racing	15	Ret	Ret		10	Ret	6	NC	8	7	1
-	(Italy) Autorlando	12	16	7	Ret	Ret	8	8	8	9	8	0
-	(Italy) Racing Box	13	11	Ret	Ret	Ret	7	Ret	13	12	Ret	0
-	(Germany) Proton Competition	11	18	8	Ret	8	10	Ret	9	11	Ret	0
-	(Switzerland) Haberthur Racing	9	17	10	11		9		11	10	DNS	0
-	(Switzerland) Haberthur Racing	Ret		Ret								0
-	(Portugal) Estoril Racing		14								9	0
-	(Germany) RWS	10	13	Ret		11						0
-	(Germany) Reiter Engineering							Ret	10	Ret		0
-	(United Kingdom) Felbermayr				10							0
-	(United Kingdom) Cirtek Motorsport						12					0
-	(Germany) Seikel Motorsport	14	15									0
-	(Switzerland) First Racing	Ret		Ret			Ret			Ret	Ret	0
-	(Germany) KRT Lamborghini Racing				DNS	DNS		Ret		Ret		0
-	(Germany) Rupert Atzberger										Ret	0
-	(United Kingdom) BVB Motorsport				DNS							0
-	(Hungary) Bovi Motorsport					DNS						0

Colour	Result
Gold	Winner
Silver	Second place
Bronze	Third place
Green	Points classification
Blue	Non-points classification
Blue	Non-classified finish (NC)
Purple	Retired, not classified (Ret)
Red	Did not qualify (DNQ)
Red	Did not pre-qualify (DNPQ)
Black	Disqualified (DSQ)
White	Did not start (DNS)
White	Withdrew (WD)
White	Race cancelled (C)
Blank	Did not practice (DNP)
Blank	Did not arrive (DNA)
Blank	Excluded (EX)

==== N-GT Cup ====
Pos.	Team	VAL (Spain)	EST (Portugal)	MON (Italy)	SIL (United Kingdom)	HUN (Hungary)	ZOL (Belgium)	A1R (Austria)	LAU (Germany)	BRN (Czech Republic)	MAG (France)	Total points
1	(France) Larbre Compétition Chereau	1	1	3	1	1	2	4	2	1	1	89
1	(France) Larbre Compétition Chereau	4	7	5	5	Ret	5	6	6	3	9	89
2	(Germany) RWS / Red Bull Racing	5	2	Ret	2	4	1	3	1	2	2	57
2	(Germany) RWS / Red Bull Racing					Ret	Ret	Ret	5	4	5	57
3	(United Kingdom) Pennzoil Quaker State G-Force	2	3	1	3	2	3	Ret	3	Ret	3	51
3	(United Kingdom) Pennzoil Quaker State G-Force	8	5	Ret	4	3	4	Ret	8	Ret	Ret	51
4	(United Kingdom) EMKA GTC	3	4	2	12	5	NC	2	4		Ret	22.5
5	(Italy) ART Engineering			4	6	Ret	Ret	1	7	6	7	15
5	(Italy) ART Engineering							Ret	10	7	8	15
6	(Italy) MAC Racing	7	6	6	8	6	6	5	9			5.5
6	(Italy) MAC Racing		8	8		7	Ret					5.5
7	(France) Perspective Racing	6									4	4
8	(Switzerland) Haberthur Racing			Ret					Ret	5	6	3
-	(United Kingdom) Cirtek Motorsport				9		7					0
-	(Switzerland) Loris Kessel Racing			7								0
-	(Germany) Seikel Motorsport				7							0
-	(France) JMB Competition			9	10		8				10	0
-	(France) JMB Competition				13		9				11	0
-	(France) Noël del Bello Racing	9		Ret								0
-	(Italy) Supertech erg			10								0
-	(Switzerland) LRO			11	11							0
-	(Germany) Freisinger Motorsport								11		Ret	0

== Bibliography ==
- Asselberghs, Denis; Richardson, Frederic (2000). 2000 FIA GT Championship Annual. Brussels: Apach Media. ISBN 978-2930354040.
