= 2000 FIA GT Lausitzring 500km =

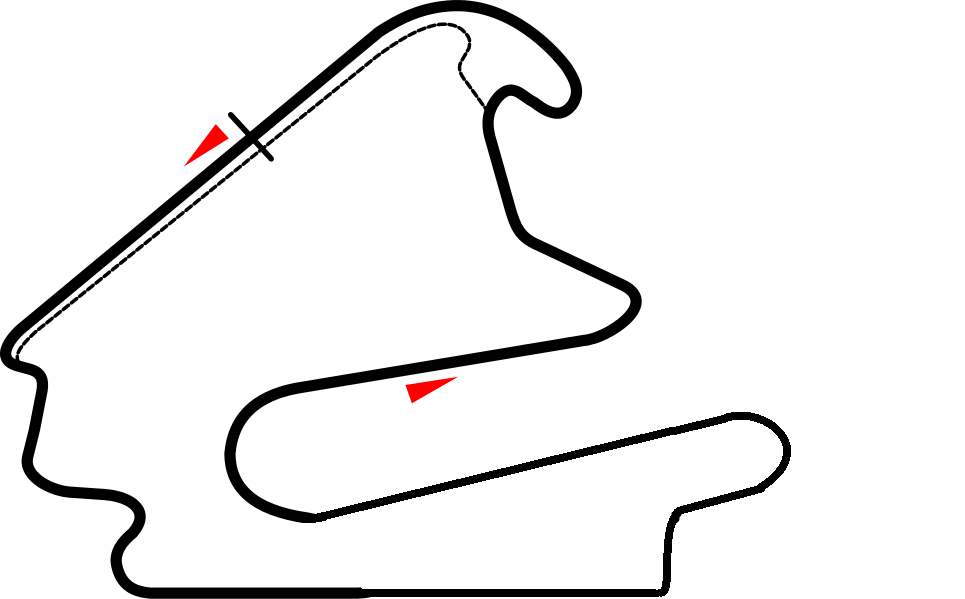
Layout of the EuroSpeedway Lausitz GP circuit

The 2000 FIA GT Lausitzring 500 km was the eighth round the 2000 FIA GT Championship season. It took place at the Lausitzring, Germany, on September 2, 2000. The event was shared with a round of the Deutsche Tourenwagen Masters.

== Official results ==
Class winners in bold. Cars failing to complete 70% of winner's distance marked as Not Classified (NC).

Pos	Class	No	Team	Drivers	Chassis	Tyre	Laps
Pos	Class	No	Team	Drivers	Engine	Tyre	Laps
1	**GT**	**3**	**(Germany) Freisinger Motorsport**	**(Germany) Hubert Haupt (Germany) Wolfgang Kaufmann**	**Porsche 911 GT2**	D	**79**
1	**GT**	**3**	**(Germany) Freisinger Motorsport**	**(Germany) Hubert Haupt (Germany) Wolfgang Kaufmann**	**Porsche 3.8L Turbo Flat-6**	D	**79**
2	GT	12	(France) Paul Belmondo Racing	(France) Boris Derichebourg (Belgium) Vincent Vosse	Chrysler Viper GTS-R	D	79
2	GT	12	(France) Paul Belmondo Racing	(France) Boris Derichebourg (Belgium) Vincent Vosse	Chrysler 8.0L V10	D	79
3	**N-GT**	**77**	**(Germany) RWS Red Bull Racing**	**(Italy) Luca Riccitelli (Austria) Dieter Quester**	**Porsche 911 GT3-R**	MI	**79**
3	**N-GT**	**77**	**(Germany) RWS Red Bull Racing**	**(Italy) Luca Riccitelli (Austria) Dieter Quester**	**Porsche 3.6L Flat-6**	MI	**79**
4	N-GT	52	(France) Larbre Compétition Chéreau	(France) Christophe Bouchut (France) Patrice Goueslard	Porsche 911 GT3-R	MI	78
4	N-GT	52	(France) Larbre Compétition Chéreau	(France) Christophe Bouchut (France) Patrice Goueslard	Porsche 3.6L Flat-6	MI	78
5	GT	14	(United Kingdom) Lister Storm Racing	(United Kingdom) Jamie Campbell-Walter (United Kingdom) Julian Bailey	Lister Storm	MI	78
5	GT	14	(United Kingdom) Lister Storm Racing	(United Kingdom) Jamie Campbell-Walter (United Kingdom) Julian Bailey	Jaguar 7.0L V12	MI	78
6	N-GT	50	(United Kingdom) Pennzoil Quaker State G-Force	(United Kingdom) Nigel Smith (Sweden) Magnus Wallinder	Porsche 911 GT3-R	D	78
6	N-GT	50	(United Kingdom) Pennzoil Quaker State G-Force	(United Kingdom) Nigel Smith (Sweden) Magnus Wallinder	Porsche 3.6L Flat-6	D	78
7	N-GT	56	(United Kingdom) EMKA GTC	(United Kingdom) Steve O'Rourke (United Kingdom) Tim Sugden	Porsche 911 GT3-R	P	77
7	N-GT	56	(United Kingdom) EMKA GTC	(United Kingdom) Steve O'Rourke (United Kingdom) Tim Sugden	Porsche 3.6L Flat-6	P	77
8	N-GT	79	(Germany) RWS Red Bull Racing	(Netherlands) Patrick Huisman (Austria) Hans-Jörg Hofer	Porsche 911 GT3-R	MI	76
8	N-GT	79	(Germany) RWS Red Bull Racing	(Netherlands) Patrick Huisman (Austria) Hans-Jörg Hofer	Porsche 3.6L Flat-6	MI	76
9	GT	25	(Netherlands) Carsport Holland	(Netherlands) Mike Hezemans (Netherlands) David Hart	Chrysler Viper GTS-R	MI	76
9	GT	25	(Netherlands) Carsport Holland	(Netherlands) Mike Hezemans (Netherlands) David Hart	Chrysler 8.0L V10	MI	76
10	N-GT	53	(France) Larbre Compétition Chéreau	(France) Ferdinand de Lesseps (Germany) André Ahrlé	Porsche 911 GT3-R	MI	76
10	N-GT	53	(France) Larbre Compétition Chéreau	(France) Ferdinand de Lesseps (Germany) André Ahrlé	Porsche 3.6L Flat-6	MI	76
11	GT	5	(Germany) Konrad Motorsport	(Austria) Franz Konrad (Germany) Jürgen von Gartzen	Porsche 911 GT2	D	76
11	GT	5	(Germany) Konrad Motorsport	(Austria) Franz Konrad (Germany) Jürgen von Gartzen	Porsche 3.8L Turbo Flat-6	D	76
12	N-GT	55	(Italy) ART Engineering	(Italy) Constantino Bertuzzi (Italy) Pierangelo Masselli	Porsche 911 GT3-R	P	75
12	N-GT	55	(Italy) ART Engineering	(Italy) Constantino Bertuzzi (Italy) Pierangelo Masselli	Porsche 3.6L Flat-6	P	75
13	GT	15	(United Kingdom) Lister Storm Racing	(Germany) Nicolaus Springer (Switzerland) Philippe Favre	Lister Storm	MI	75
13	GT	15	(United Kingdom) Lister Storm Racing	(Germany) Nicolaus Springer (Switzerland) Philippe Favre	Jaguar 7.0L V12	MI	75
14	GT	11	(France) Paul Belmondo Racing	(France) Paul Belmondo (France) Claude-Yves Gosselin	Chrysler Viper GTS-R	D	75
14	GT	11	(France) Paul Belmondo Racing	(France) Paul Belmondo (France) Claude-Yves Gosselin	Chrysler 8.0L V10	D	75
15	N-GT	51	(United Kingdom) Pennzoil Quaker State G-Force	(United Kingdom) Richard Nearn (Belgium) Hans Willems	Porsche 911 GT3-R	D	75
15	N-GT	51	(United Kingdom) Pennzoil Quaker State G-Force	(United Kingdom) Richard Nearn (Belgium) Hans Willems	Porsche 3.6L Flat-6	D	75
16	GT	27	(Italy) Autorlando	(Italy) Marco Spinelli (Italy) Gabriele Sabatini (Italy) Fabio Villa	Porsche 911 GT2	P	74
16	GT	27	(Italy) Autorlando	(Italy) Marco Spinelli (Italy) Gabriele Sabatini (Italy) Fabio Villa	Porsche 3.8L Turbo Flat-6	P	74
17	N-GT	67	(Italy) MAC Racing	(Italy) Paolo Roberti (Italy) Roberto Orlandi	Porsche 911 GT3-R	D	74
17	N-GT	67	(Italy) MAC Racing	(Italy) Paolo Roberti (Italy) Roberto Orlandi	Porsche 3.6L Flat-6	D	74
18	N-GT	57	(Italy) ART Engineering	(Italy) Fabio Mancini (Italy) Gianni Collini	Porsche 911 GT3-R	P	73
18	N-GT	57	(Italy) ART Engineering	(Italy) Fabio Mancini (Italy) Gianni Collini	Porsche 3.6L Flat-6	P	73
19	GT	7	(Germany) Proton Competition	(Germany) Gerold Ried (Germany) Christian Ried	Porsche 911 GT2	Y	73
19	GT	7	(Germany) Proton Competition	(Germany) Gerold Ried (Germany) Christian Ried	Porsche 3.6L Turbo Flat-6	Y	73
20	GT	24	(Germany) Reiter Engineering	(Germany) Michael Trunk (Germany) Bernhard Müller	Lamborghini Diablo GT	MI	72
20	GT	24	(Germany) Reiter Engineering	(Germany) Michael Trunk (Germany) Bernhard Müller	Lamborghini 6.0L V12	MI	72
21	GT	8	(Switzerland) Haberthur Racing	(Italy) Andrea Garbagnati (Italy) Mauro Casadei	Porsche 911 GT2	D	71
21	GT	8	(Switzerland) Haberthur Racing	(Italy) Andrea Garbagnati (Italy) Mauro Casadei	Porsche 3.8L Turbo Flat-6	D	71
22	GT	4	(Germany) Freisinger Motorsport	(Germany) Ernst Palmberger (Japan) Yukihiro Hane	Porsche 911 GT2	D	71
22	GT	4	(Germany) Freisinger Motorsport	(Germany) Ernst Palmberger (Japan) Yukihiro Hane	Porsche 3.8L Turbo Flat-6	D	71
23	N-GT	58	(Germany) Freisinger Motorsport	(Russia) Nikolai Fomenko (Russia) Alexey Vasilyev	Porsche 911 GT3-R	D	67
23	N-GT	58	(Germany) Freisinger Motorsport	(Russia) Nikolai Fomenko (Russia) Alexey Vasilyev	Porsche 3.6L Flat-6	D	67
24	GT	21	(Italy) Racing Box	(Italy) Luca Cappellari (Italy) Raffaele Sangiuolo (Italy) Giorgio Tibaldo	Chrysler Viper GTS-R	D	57
24	GT	21	(Italy) Racing Box	(Italy) Luca Cappellari (Italy) Raffaele Sangiuolo (Italy) Giorgio Tibaldo	Chrysler 8.0L V10	D	57
25 NC	GT	22	(Germany) Wieth Racing	(Germany) Niko Wieth (Germany) Franz Wieth	Porsche 911 GT2	D	48
25 NC	GT	22	(Germany) Wieth Racing	(Germany) Niko Wieth (Germany) Franz Wieth	Porsche 3.8L Turbo Flat-6	D	48
26 DSQ^{†}	GT	2	(United Kingdom) Chamberlain Motorsport	(Switzerland) Walter Brun (Switzerland) Toni Seiler	Chrysler Viper GTS-R	MI	44
26 DSQ^{†}	GT	2	(United Kingdom) Chamberlain Motorsport	(Switzerland) Walter Brun (Switzerland) Toni Seiler	Chrysler 8.0L V10	MI	44
27 DNF	N-GT	60	(Switzerland) Haberthur Racing	(France) Michel Ligonnet (Belgium) Michael Neugarten	Porsche 911 GT3-R	D	22
27 DNF	N-GT	60	(Switzerland) Haberthur Racing	(France) Michel Ligonnet (Belgium) Michael Neugarten	Porsche 3.6L Flat-6	D	22

† – #2 Chamberlain Motorsport was disqualified for unsporting conduct during the race.

== Statistics ==
- Pole position – #25 Carsport Holland – 1:43.854
- Fastest lap – #14 Lister Storm Racing – 1:43.830
- Average speed – 190.897 km/h

FIA GT Championship
Previous race: 2000 FIA GT A1-Ring 500km	2000 season	Next race: 2000 FIA GT Brno 500km
