= 2000 FIA GT Budapest 500km =

Layout of the Hungaroring (1989-2002)

The 2000 FIA GT Budapest 500 km was the fifth round the 2000 FIA GT Championship season. It took place at the Hungaroring, Hungary, on July 2, 2000.

== Official results ==
Class winners in bold. Cars failing to complete 70% of winner's distance marked as Not Classified (NC).

| Pos | Class | No | Team | Drivers | Chassis | Tyre | Laps |
| Pos | Class | No | Team | Drivers | Engine | Tyre | Laps |
|---|---|---|---|---|---|---|---|
| 1 | **GT** | **12** | **(France) Paul Belmondo Racing** | **(France) Boris Derichebourg (Belgium) Vincent Vosse** | **Chrysler Viper GTS-R** | **D** | **104** |
| 1 | **GT** | **12** | **(France) Paul Belmondo Racing** | **(France) Boris Derichebourg (Belgium) Vincent Vosse** | **Chrysler 8.0L V10** | **D** | **104** |
| 2 | GT | 15 | (United Kingdom) Lister Storm Racing | (Germany) Nicolaus Springer (Switzerland) Philippe Favre | Lister Storm | **MI** | 104 |
| 2 | GT | 15 | (United Kingdom) Lister Storm Racing | (Germany) Nicolaus Springer (Switzerland) Philippe Favre | Jaguar 7.0L V12 | **MI** | 104 |
| 3 | GT | 1 | (United Kingdom) Chamberlain Motorsport | (Hungary) Tamás Illés (South Africa) Stephen Watson | Chrysler Viper GTS-R | **MI** | 102 |
| 3 | GT | 1 | (United Kingdom) Chamberlain Motorsport | (Hungary) Tamás Illés (South Africa) Stephen Watson | Chrysler 8.0L V10 | **MI** | 102 |
| 4 | GT | 4 | (Germany) Freisinger Motorsport | (Germany) Ernst Palmberger (Japan) Yukihiro Hane | Porsche 911 GT2 | **D** | 101 |
| 4 | GT | 4 | (Germany) Freisinger Motorsport | (Germany) Ernst Palmberger (Japan) Yukihiro Hane | Porsche 3.8L Turbo Flat-6 | **D** | 101 |
| 5 | GT | 5 | (Germany) Konrad Motorsport | (Austria) Franz Konrad (Germany) Jürgen von Gartzen | Porsche 911 GT2 | **D** | 101 |
| 5 | GT | 5 | (Germany) Konrad Motorsport | (Austria) Franz Konrad (Germany) Jürgen von Gartzen | Porsche 3.8L Turbo Flat-6 | **D** | 101 |
| 6 | GT | 25 | (Netherlands) Carsport Holland | (Netherlands) Mike Hezemans (Netherlands) David Hart | Chrysler Viper GTS-R | **MI** | 101 |
| 6 | GT | 25 | (Netherlands) Carsport Holland | (Netherlands) Mike Hezemans (Netherlands) David Hart | Chrysler 8.0L V10 | **MI** | 101 |
| 7 | GT | 3 | (Germany) Freisinger Motorsport | (France) Bob Wollek (Germany) Wolfgang Kaufmann | Porsche 911 GT2 | **D** | 100 |
| 7 | GT | 3 | (Germany) Freisinger Motorsport | (France) Bob Wollek (Germany) Wolfgang Kaufmann | Porsche 3.8L Turbo Flat-6 | **D** | 100 |
| 8 | **N-GT** | **52** | **(France) Larbre Compétition Chéreau** | **(France) Christophe Bouchut (France) Patrice Goueslard** | **Porsche 911 GT3-R** | **MI** | **100** |
| 8 | **N-GT** | **52** | **(France) Larbre Compétition Chéreau** | **(France) Christophe Bouchut (France) Patrice Goueslard** | **Porsche 3.6L Flat-6** | **MI** | **100** |
| 9 | N-GT | 51 | (United Kingdom) Pennzoil Quaker State G-Force | (United Kingdom) Richard Nearn (Belgium) Michel Neugarten | Porsche 911 GT3-R | **D** | 100 |
| 9 | N-GT | 51 | (United Kingdom) Pennzoil Quaker State G-Force | (United Kingdom) Richard Nearn (Belgium) Michel Neugarten | Porsche 3.6L Flat-6 | **D** | 100 |
| 10 | N-GT | 50 | (United Kingdom) Pennzoil Quaker State G-Force | (United Kingdom) Nigel Smith (Sweden) Magnus Wallinder | Porsche 911 GT3-R | **D** | 100 |
| 10 | N-GT | 50 | (United Kingdom) Pennzoil Quaker State G-Force | (United Kingdom) Nigel Smith (Sweden) Magnus Wallinder | Porsche 3.6L Flat-6 | **D** | 100 |
| 11 | GT | 7 | (Germany) Proton Competition | (Germany) Gerold Ried (Germany) Christian Ried | Porsche 911 GT2 | **Y** | 98 |
| 11 | GT | 7 | (Germany) Proton Competition | (Germany) Gerold Ried (Germany) Christian Ried | Porsche 3.6L Turbo Flat-6 | **Y** | 98 |
| 12 | N-GT | 79 | (Germany) RWS Red Bull Racing | (Austria) Philipp Peter (Austria) Hans-Jörg Hofer (Austria) Dieter Quester | Porsche 911 GT3-R | **MI** | 98 |
| 12 | N-GT | 79 | (Germany) RWS Red Bull Racing | (Austria) Philipp Peter (Austria) Hans-Jörg Hofer (Austria) Dieter Quester | Porsche 3.6L Flat-6 | **MI** | 98 |
| 13 | GT | 6 | (Germany) Konrad Motorsport | (Denmark) Kurt Thiel (Austria) Manfred Jurasz | Porsche 911 GT2 | **D** | 98 |
| 13 | GT | 6 | (Germany) Konrad Motorsport | (Denmark) Kurt Thiel (Austria) Manfred Jurasz | Porsche 3.8L Turbo Flat-6 | **D** | 98 |
| 14 | GT | 22 | (Germany) Wieth Racing | (Germany) Niko Wieth (Germany) Franz Wieth | Porsche 911 GT2 | **D** | 98 |
| 14 | GT | 22 | (Germany) Wieth Racing | (Germany) Niko Wieth (Germany) Franz Wieth | Porsche 3.8L Turbo Flat-6 | **D** | 98 |
| 15 | N-GT | 56 | (United Kingdom) EMKA GTC | (United Kingdom) Steve O'Rourke (United Kingdom) Tim Sugden | Porsche 911 GT3-R | **P** | 98 |
| 15 | N-GT | 56 | (United Kingdom) EMKA GTC | (United Kingdom) Steve O'Rourke (United Kingdom) Tim Sugden | Porsche 3.6L Flat-6 | **P** | 98 |
| 16 | N-GT | 67 | (Italy) MAC Racing | (Italy) Fabio Mancini (Italy) Gianni Collini | Porsche 911 GT3-R | **D** | 97 |
| 16 | N-GT | 67 | (Italy) MAC Racing | (Italy) Fabio Mancini (Italy) Gianni Collini | Porsche 3.6L Flat-6 | **D** | 97 |
| 17 | N-GT | 66 | (Italy) MAC Racing | (Italy) Massimo Frigerio (Italy) Paolo Rapetti | Porsche 911 GT3-R | **D** | 95 |
| 17 | N-GT | 66 | (Italy) MAC Racing | (Italy) Massimo Frigerio (Italy) Paolo Rapetti | Porsche 3.6L Flat-6 | **D** | 95 |
| 18 | GT | 28 | (Germany) RWS | (Austria) Horst Felbermayr, Sr. (Austria) Horst Felbermayr, Jr. | Porsche 911 GT2 | ? | 89 |
| 18 | GT | 28 | (Germany) RWS | (Austria) Horst Felbermayr, Sr. (Austria) Horst Felbermayr, Jr. | Porsche 3.8L Turbo Flat-6 | ? | 89 |
| 19 DNF | N-GT | 55 | (Italy) ART Engineering | (Italy) Constantino Bertuzzi (Italy) Pierangelo Masselli | Porsche 911 GT3-R | **P** | 64 |
| 19 DNF | N-GT | 55 | (Italy) ART Engineering | (Italy) Constantino Bertuzzi (Italy) Pierangelo Masselli | Porsche 3.6L Flat-6 | **P** | 64 |
| 20 DNF | GT | 21 | (Italy) Racing Box | (Italy) Luca Cappellari (Italy) Raffaele Sangiuolo (Italy) Gabriele Matteuzzi | Chrysler Viper GTS-R | **D** | 33 |
| 20 DNF | GT | 21 | (Italy) Racing Box | (Italy) Luca Cappellari (Italy) Raffaele Sangiuolo (Italy) Gabriele Matteuzzi | Chrysler 8.0L V10 | **D** | 33 |
| 21 DNF | N-GT | 53 | (France) Larbre Compétition Chéreau | (France) Sébastien Bourdais (France) Jean-Luc Chéreau (Germany) André Ahrlé | Porsche 911 GT3-R | **MI** | 15 |
| 21 DNF | N-GT | 53 | (France) Larbre Compétition Chéreau | (France) Sébastien Bourdais (France) Jean-Luc Chéreau (Germany) André Ahrlé | Porsche 3.6L Flat-6 | **MI** | 15 |
| 22 DNF | GT | 27 | (Italy) Autorlando | (Italy) Marco Spinelli (Italy) Fabio Villa (Italy) Gabriele Sabatini | Porsche 911 GT2 | **P** | 13 |
| 22 DNF | GT | 27 | (Italy) Autorlando | (Italy) Marco Spinelli (Italy) Fabio Villa (Italy) Gabriele Sabatini | Porsche 3.8L Turbo Flat-6 | **P** | 13 |
| 23 DNF | GT | 14 | (United Kingdom) Lister Storm Racing | (United Kingdom) Jamie Campbell-Walter (United Kingdom) Julian Bailey | Lister Storm | **MI** | 1 |
| 23 DNF | GT | 14 | (United Kingdom) Lister Storm Racing | (United Kingdom) Jamie Campbell-Walter (United Kingdom) Julian Bailey | Jaguar 7.0L V12 | **MI** | 1 |
| 24 DNF | N-GT | 77 | (Germany) RWS Red Bull Racing | (Italy) Luca Riccitelli (Belgium) Hans Willems | Porsche 911 GT3-R | **MI** | 1 |
| 24 DNF | N-GT | 77 | (Germany) RWS Red Bull Racing | (Italy) Luca Riccitelli (Belgium) Hans Willems | Porsche 3.6L Flat-6 | **MI** | 1 |
| 25 DNF | GT | 11 | (France) Paul Belmondo Racing | (France) Paul Belmondo (France) Claude-Yves Gosselin | Chrysler Viper GTS-R | **D** | 0 |
| 25 DNF | GT | 11 | (France) Paul Belmondo Racing | (France) Paul Belmondo (France) Claude-Yves Gosselin | Chrysler 8.0L V10 | **D** | 0 |
| DNS | GT | 23 | (Germany) KRT Lamborghini Racing | (Germany) Günther Kronsender (Germany) Josef Jobst | Lamborghini Diablo GTR | **MI** | – |
| DNS | GT | 23 | (Germany) KRT Lamborghini Racing | (Germany) Günther Kronsender (Germany) Josef Jobst | Lamborghini 6.0L V12 | **MI** | – |
| DNS | GT | 37 | (Hungary) Bovi Motorsport | (Hungary) Kálmán Bódis (Hungary) Atilla Barta (Hungary) Andras Bakos | Porsche 911 GT2 | ? | – |
| DNS | GT | 37 | (Hungary) Bovi Motorsport | (Hungary) Kálmán Bódis (Hungary) Atilla Barta (Hungary) Andras Bakos | Porsche 3.6L Turbo Flat-6 | ? | – |

== Statistics ==
- Pole position – #15 Lister Storm Racing – 1:38.138
- Fastest lap – #15 Lister Storm Racing – 1:39.708
- Average speed – 136.310 km/h

FIA GT Championship
| Previous race: 2000 FIA GT Silverstone 500km | 2000 season | Next race: 2000 FIA GT Zolder 500km |
