= 1999 FIA GT Silverstone 500 miles =

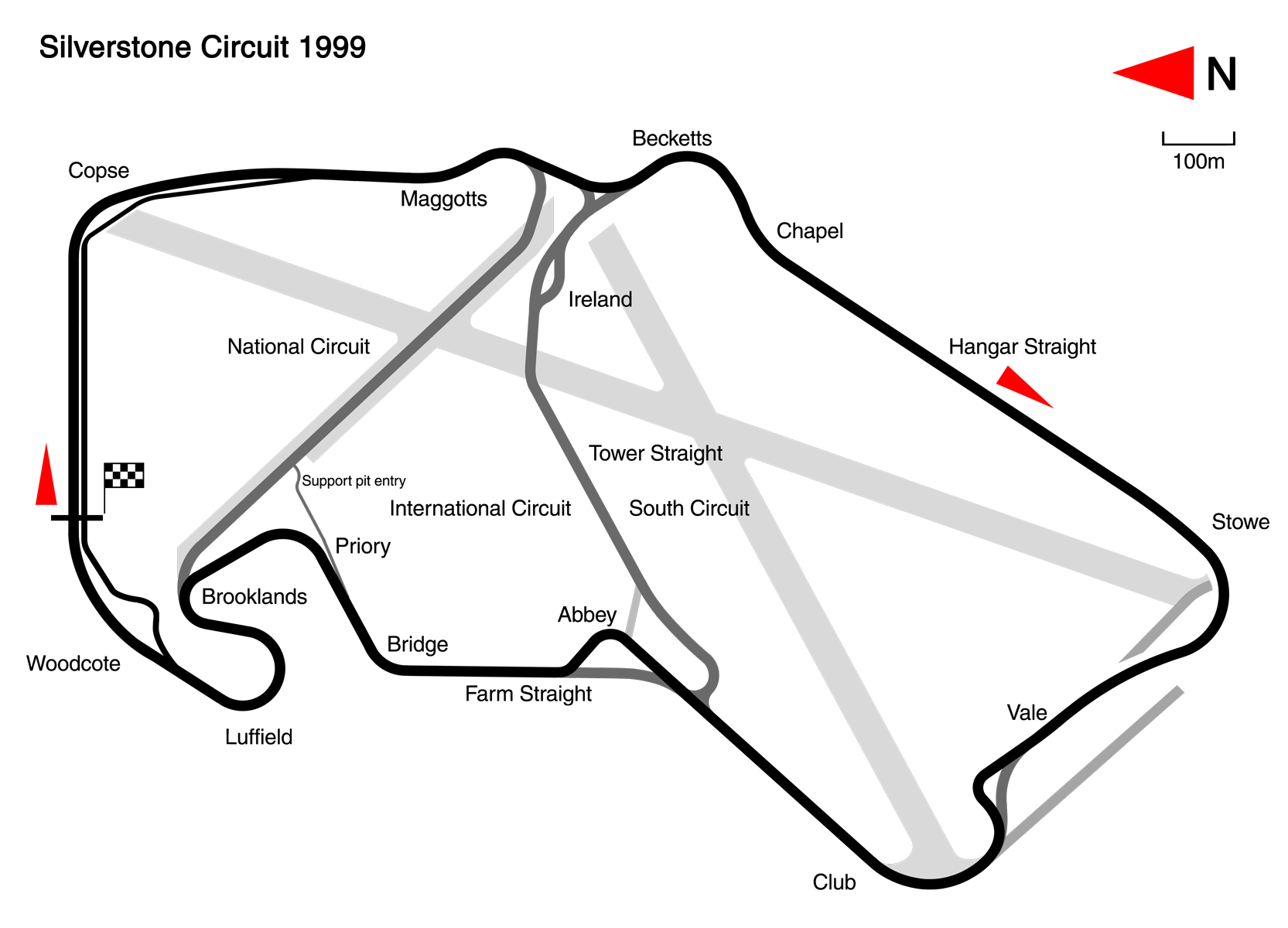
Map of the Silverstone Circuit (1999)

The P&O Stena Line Silverstone 500 miles was the second round of the 1999 FIA GT Championship. It took place at the Silverstone Circuit, United Kingdom, on 9 May 1999. This event was also designated as the British Empire Trophy for the year.

== Official results ==
Cars failing to complete 70% of winner's distance are marked as Not Classified (NC).

Pos	No	Team	Drivers	Chassis	Tyre	Laps
Pos	No	Team	Drivers	Engine	Tyre	Laps
1	1	(France) Chrysler Viper Team Oreca	(Monaco) Olivier Beretta (Austria) Karl Wendlinger	Chrysler Viper GTS-R	MI	157
1	1	(France) Chrysler Viper Team Oreca	(Monaco) Olivier Beretta (Austria) Karl Wendlinger	Chrysler 8.0L V10	MI	157
2	2	(France) Chrysler Viper Team Oreca	(France) Jean-Philippe Belloc (United States) David Donohue (United Kingdom) Justin Bell	Chrysler Viper GTS-R	MI	157
2	2	(France) Chrysler Viper Team Oreca	(France) Jean-Philippe Belloc (United States) David Donohue (United Kingdom) Justin Bell	Chrysler 8.0L V10	MI	157
3	33	(Belgium) GLPK Racing	(Belgium) Vincent Vosse (Belgium) Didier Defourny (Belgium) Marc Duez	Chrysler Viper GTS-R	D	155
3	33	(Belgium) GLPK Racing	(Belgium) Vincent Vosse (Belgium) Didier Defourny (Belgium) Marc Duez	Chrysler 8.0L V10	D	155
4	19	(United Kingdom) Chamberlain Motorsport	(United Kingdom) Christian Vann (Germany) Christian Gläsel (Netherlands) Hans Hugenholtz	Chrysler Viper GTS-R	MI	154
4	19	(United Kingdom) Chamberlain Motorsport	(United Kingdom) Christian Vann (Germany) Christian Gläsel (Netherlands) Hans Hugenholtz	Chrysler 8.0L V10	MI	154
5	3	(Germany) Roock Racing	(Germany) Claudia Hürtgen (France) Stéphane Ortelli	Porsche 911 GT2	Y	154
5	3	(Germany) Roock Racing	(Germany) Claudia Hürtgen (France) Stéphane Ortelli	Porsche 3.6L Turbo Flat-6	Y	154
6	15	(Germany) Freisinger Motorsport	(France) Michel Ligonnet (Germany) Wolfgang Kaufmann	Porsche 911 GT2	D	152
6	15	(Germany) Freisinger Motorsport	(France) Michel Ligonnet (Germany) Wolfgang Kaufmann	Porsche 3.6L Turbo Flat-6	D	152
7	21	(France) Paul Belmondo Racing	(France) Paul Belmondo (France) Claude Yves-Gosselin (France) Marc Rostan	Chrysler Viper GTS-R	D	151
7	21	(France) Paul Belmondo Racing	(France) Paul Belmondo (France) Claude Yves-Gosselin (France) Marc Rostan	Chrysler 8.0L V10	D	151
8	30	(United Kingdom) BVB	(United Kingdom) Geoff Lister (United Kingdom) Max Beeverbroock	Porsche 911 GT2	D	150
8	30	(United Kingdom) BVB	(United Kingdom) Geoff Lister (United Kingdom) Max Beeverbroock	Porsche 3.6L Turbo Flat-6	D	150
9	77	(Germany) Seikel Motorsport	(Germany) Ernst Palmberger (United Kingdom) Nigel Smith (United Kingdom) Richard Nearn	Porsche 911 GT2	D	149
9	77	(Germany) Seikel Motorsport	(Germany) Ernst Palmberger (United Kingdom) Nigel Smith (United Kingdom) Richard Nearn	Porsche 3.6L Turbo Flat-6	D	149
10	69	(Germany) Proton Competition	(Germany) Gerold Ried (Germany) Christian Ried (France) Patrick Vuillaume	Porsche 911 GT2	Y	147
10	69	(Germany) Proton Competition	(Germany) Gerold Ried (Germany) Christian Ried (France) Patrick Vuillaume	Porsche 3.6L Turbo Flat-6	Y	147
11	24	(Germany) RWS Motorsport	(Austria) Horst Felbermayr, Sr. (Austria) Horst Felbermayr, Jr.	Porsche 911 GT2	?	147
11	24	(Germany) RWS Motorsport	(Austria) Horst Felbermayr, Sr. (Austria) Horst Felbermayr, Jr.	Porsche 3.6L Turbo Flat-6	?	147
12	31	(France) Sunauto	(France) Jean-Pierre Jarier (France) François Lafon (Belgium) Michel Neugarten	Porsche 911 GT2	P	145
12	31	(France) Sunauto	(France) Jean-Pierre Jarier (France) François Lafon (Belgium) Michel Neugarten	Porsche 3.6L Turbo Flat-6	P	145
13	6	(Germany) Konrad Motorsport	(Austria) Franz Konrad (Netherlands) Mike Hezemans	Porsche 911 GT2	D	141
13	6	(Germany) Konrad Motorsport	(Austria) Franz Konrad (Netherlands) Mike Hezemans	Porsche 3.6L Turbo Flat-6	D	141
14 DNF	9	(Switzerland) Haberthur Racing	(Italy) Stefano Bucci (Italy) Andrea Garbagnati (Italy) Mauro Casadei	Porsche 911 GT2	D	138
14 DNF	9	(Switzerland) Haberthur Racing	(Italy) Stefano Bucci (Italy) Andrea Garbagnati (Italy) Mauro Casadei	Porsche 3.6L Turbo Flat-6	D	138
15 DNF	18	(United Kingdom) Chamberlain Motorsport	(Portugal) Ni Amorim (United Kingdom) Will Hoy (Switzerland) Toni Seiler	Chrysler Viper GTS-R	MI	123
15 DNF	18	(United Kingdom) Chamberlain Motorsport	(Portugal) Ni Amorim (United Kingdom) Will Hoy (Switzerland) Toni Seiler	Chrysler 8.0L V10	MI	123
16 DNF	8	(Switzerland) Haberthur Racing	(Italy) Luca Cappellari (Italy) Angelo Zadra (France) Patrice Goueslard	Porsche 911 GT2	D	122
16 DNF	8	(Switzerland) Haberthur Racing	(Italy) Luca Cappellari (Italy) Angelo Zadra (France) Patrice Goueslard	Porsche 3.6L Turbo Flat-6	D	122
17 DNF	16	(Germany) Freisinger Motorsport	(Austria) Manfred Jurasz (France) Luis Marques	Porsche 911 GT2	D	94
17 DNF	16	(Germany) Freisinger Motorsport	(Austria) Manfred Jurasz (France) Luis Marques	Porsche 3.6L Turbo Flat-6	D	94
18 DNF	5	(Germany) Roock Sportsystem	(Germany) Michael Eschmann (Germany) Paul Hulverscheid	Porsche 911 GT2	Y	90
18 DNF	5	(Germany) Roock Sportsystem	(Germany) Michael Eschmann (Germany) Paul Hulverscheid	Porsche 3.6L Turbo Flat-6	Y	90
19 DNF	25	(United Kingdom) Lister Cars	(United Kingdom) Julian Bailey (United Kingdom) Tiff Needell (United Kingdom) Bobby Verdon-Roe	Lister Storm	MI	80
19 DNF	25	(United Kingdom) Lister Cars	(United Kingdom) Julian Bailey (United Kingdom) Tiff Needell (United Kingdom) Bobby Verdon-Roe	Jaguar 7.0L V12	MI	80
20 DNF	4	(Germany) Roock Racing	(Germany) André Ahrlé (Germany) Hubert Haupt	Porsche 911 GT2	Y	42
20 DNF	4	(Germany) Roock Racing	(Germany) André Ahrlé (Germany) Hubert Haupt	Porsche 3.6L Turbo Flat-6	Y	42
21 DNF	32	(Germany) Roock Sportsystem	(Italy) Raffaele Sangiuolo (United Kingdom) Hugh Price (United Kingdom) John Robinson	Porsche 911 GT2	Y	41
21 DNF	32	(Germany) Roock Sportsystem	(Italy) Raffaele Sangiuolo (United Kingdom) Hugh Price (United Kingdom) John Robinson	Porsche 3.6L Turbo Flat-6	Y	41
22 DNF	23	(France) Werner (France) Paul Belmondo Racing	(France) Philippe Auvray (France) Francis Werner (France) Jacques Piattier	Porsche 911 GT2	D	13
22 DNF	23	(France) Werner (France) Paul Belmondo Racing	(France) Philippe Auvray (France) Francis Werner (France) Jacques Piattier	Porsche 3.6L Turbo Flat-6	D	13
23 DNF	78	(Germany) Seikel Motorsport	(Italy) Renato Mastropietro (Italy) Paolo Zanichelli (Italy) Claudio Padovani	Porsche 911 GT2	D	0
23 DNF	78	(Germany) Seikel Motorsport	(Italy) Renato Mastropietro (Italy) Paolo Zanichelli (Italy) Claudio Padovani	Porsche 3.6L Turbo Flat-6	D	0

== Statistics ==
- Pole position – #1 Chrysler Viper Team Oreca – 1:49.266
- Fastest lap – #2 Chrysler Viper Team Oreca – 1:50.763
- Average speed – 154.989 km/h

FIA GT Championship
Previous race: 1999 FIA GT Monza 500km	1999 season	Next race: 1999 FIA GT Hockenheim 500km
