= 1999 FIA GT Zhuhai 500km =

The Track map of Zhuhai International Circuit

The 1999 FIA GT Zhuhai 500 km was the tenth and final round the 1999 FIA GT Championship season. It took place at the Zhuhai International Circuit, China, on November 26, 1999.

As with the previous two FIA GT events in the United States, a second class of cars was allowed to compete in order to help fill the field. These cars, designated as National GT (N-GT), were cars from smaller national championships. They were not eligible for points.

== Official results ==
Class winners are in bold. Cars failing to complete 70% of winner's distance are marked as Not Classified (NC).

| Pos | Class | No | Team | Drivers | Chassis | Tyre | Laps |
| Pos | Class | No | Team | Drivers | Engine | Tyre | Laps |
|---|---|---|---|---|---|---|---|
| 1 | **GT** | **1** | **(France) Viper Team Oreca** | **(Monaco) Olivier Beretta (Austria) Karl Wendlinger** | **Chrysler Viper GTS-R** | **MI** | **105** |
| 1 | **GT** | **1** | **(France) Viper Team Oreca** | **(Monaco) Olivier Beretta (Austria) Karl Wendlinger** | **Chrysler 8.0L V10** | **MI** | **105** |
| 2 | GT | 19 | (United Kingdom) Chamberlain Motorsport | (United Kingdom) Christian Vann (Germany) Christian Gläsel | Chrysler Viper GTS-R | **MI** | 105 |
| 2 | GT | 19 | (United Kingdom) Chamberlain Motorsport | (United Kingdom) Christian Vann (Germany) Christian Gläsel | Chrysler 8.0L V10 | **MI** | 105 |
| 3 | GT | 21 | (France) Paul Belmondo Racing | (France) Paul Belmondo (France) Dominique Dupuy | Chrysler Viper GTS-R | **D** | 104 |
| 3 | GT | 21 | (France) Paul Belmondo Racing | (France) Paul Belmondo (France) Dominique Dupuy | Chrysler 8.0L V10 | **D** | 104 |
| 4 | GT | 15 | (Germany) Freisinger Motorsport | (France) Bob Wollek (Germany) Wolfgang Kaufmann | Porsche 911 GT2 | **D** | 103 |
| 4 | GT | 15 | (Germany) Freisinger Motorsport | (France) Bob Wollek (Germany) Wolfgang Kaufmann | Porsche 3.6L Turbo Flat-6 | **D** | 103 |
| 5 | GT | 2 | (France) Viper Team Oreca | (France) Jean-Philippe Belloc (Belgium) Vincent Vosse | Chrysler Viper GTS-R | **MI** | 103 |
| 5 | GT | 2 | (France) Viper Team Oreca | (France) Jean-Philippe Belloc (Belgium) Vincent Vosse | Chrysler 8.0L V10 | **MI** | 103 |
| 6 | GT | 16 | (Germany) Freisinger Motorsport | (Austria) Manfred Jurasz (Japan) Yukihiro Hane | Porsche 911 GT2 | **D** | 101 |
| 6 | GT | 16 | (Germany) Freisinger Motorsport | (Austria) Manfred Jurasz (Japan) Yukihiro Hane | Porsche 3.6L Turbo Flat-6 | **D** | 101 |
| 7 | GT | 9 | (Switzerland) Elf Haberthur Racing | (Italy) Mauro Casadei (Italy) Andrea Garbagnati | Porsche 911 GT2 | **D** | 101 |
| 7 | GT | 9 | (Switzerland) Elf Haberthur Racing | (Italy) Mauro Casadei (Italy) Andrea Garbagnati | Porsche 3.6L Turbo Flat-6 | **D** | 101 |
| 8 | GT | 69 | (Germany) Proton Competition | (Germany) Gerold Ried (Germany) Christian Ried | Porsche 911 GT2 | **Y** | 100 |
| 8 | GT | 69 | (Germany) Proton Competition | (Germany) Gerold Ried (Germany) Christian Ried | Porsche 3.6L Turbo Flat-6 | **Y** | 100 |
| 9 | GT | 3 | (Germany) Roock Racing | (United Kingdom) Adam Topping (United Kingdom) Robert Schirle (United States) Ugo Colombo | Porsche 911 GT2 | **Y** | 97 |
| 9 | GT | 3 | (Germany) Roock Racing | (United Kingdom) Adam Topping (United Kingdom) Robert Schirle (United States) Ugo Colombo | Porsche 3.6L Turbo Flat-6 | **Y** | 97 |
| 10 | **N-GT** | **72** | **(Germany) Eschmann (Germany) Roock Racing** | **(Germany) Michael Eschmann (Germany) Paul Hulverschied (France) Patrick Spadacini** | **Porsche 911 GT3 Cup** | ? | **96** |
| 10 | **N-GT** | **72** | **(Germany) Eschmann (Germany) Roock Racing** | **(Germany) Michael Eschmann (Germany) Paul Hulverschied (France) Patrick Spadacini** | **Porsche 3.6L Flat-6** | ? | **96** |
| 11 | N-GT | 62 | (Germany) Wieth Racing | (Germany) Niko Wieth (Germany) Franz Wieth | Porsche 911 GT2 | ? | 96 |
| 11 | N-GT | 62 | (Germany) Wieth Racing | (Germany) Niko Wieth (Germany) Franz Wieth | Porsche 3.6L Turbo Flat-6 | ? | 96 |
| 12 | GT | 18 | (United Kingdom) Chamberlain Motorsport | (France) Michel Ligonnet (Netherlands) Hans Hugenholtz (Portugal) Ni Amorim | Chrysler Viper GTS-R | **MI** | 92 |
| 12 | GT | 18 | (United Kingdom) Chamberlain Motorsport | (France) Michel Ligonnet (Netherlands) Hans Hugenholtz (Portugal) Ni Amorim | Chrysler 8.0L V10 | **MI** | 92 |
| 13 | N-GT | 63 | (Germany) Jörg Otto Racing | (Germany) Jörg Otto (Germany) Arthur Erkes | Porsche 964 Carrera RS | ? | 91 |
| 13 | N-GT | 63 | (Germany) Jörg Otto Racing | (Germany) Jörg Otto (Germany) Arthur Erkes | Porsche 3.8L Flat-6 | ? | 91 |
| 14 | N-GT | 74 | (France) Riverside | (France) Philippe Charriol (Switzerland) Stéphane Lang-Willar | Lamborghini Diablo SV-R | **P** | 90 |
| 14 | N-GT | 74 | (France) Riverside | (France) Philippe Charriol (Switzerland) Stéphane Lang-Willar | Lamborghini 6.0L V12 | **P** | 90 |
| 15 | N-GT | 64 | (Germany) Albert Porsche Team | (Germany) Martin Eckert (Germany) Thomas Zinnow | Porsche 964 Carrera RS | ? | 89 |
| 15 | N-GT | 64 | (Germany) Albert Porsche Team | (Germany) Martin Eckert (Germany) Thomas Zinnow | Porsche 3.8L Flat-6 | ? | 89 |
| 16 | N-GT | 73 | (Germany) Rössler Rennsport | (Germany) Wido Rössler (Germany) Helmut Reis | Lamborghini Diablo SV-R | ? | 88 |
| 16 | N-GT | 73 | (Germany) Rössler Rennsport | (Germany) Wido Rössler (Germany) Helmut Reis | Lamborghini 6.0L V12 | ? | 88 |
| 17 | N-GT | 60 | (France) Michel Laville Compétition | (France) Michel Laville (France) Olivier Leclére (France) Jacky Fabi | Venturi 400 Trophy | ? | 87 |
| 17 | N-GT | 60 | (France) Michel Laville Compétition | (France) Michel Laville (France) Olivier Leclére (France) Jacky Fabi | Peugeot PRV 3.0L Turbo V6 | ? | 87 |
| 18 | N-GT | 76 | (France) David Smadja | (France) David Smadja (France) Eric Graham | Lamborghini Diablo SV-R | ? | 79 |
| 18 | N-GT | 76 | (France) David Smadja | (France) David Smadja (France) Eric Graham | Lamborghini 6.0L V12 | ? | 79 |
| 19 NC | GT | 7 | (Germany) Konrad Motorsport | (Germany) Peter Worm (Italy) Batti Pregliasco | Porsche 911 GT2 | **D** | 56 |
| 19 NC | GT | 7 | (Germany) Konrad Motorsport | (Germany) Peter Worm (Italy) Batti Pregliasco | Porsche 3.6L Turbo Flat-6 | **D** | 56 |
| 20 NC | N-GT | 75 | (France) Riverside | (France) Georges Cabanne (China) Michael Choi Koon Ming | Lamborghini Diablo SV-R | **P** | 46 |
| 20 NC | N-GT | 75 | (France) Riverside | (France) Georges Cabanne (China) Michael Choi Koon Ming | Lamborghini 6.0L V12 | **P** | 46 |
| 21 DNF | GT | 6 | (Germany) Konrad Motorsport | (Austria) Franz Konrad (Germany) Sascha Maassen | Porsche 911 GT2 | **D** | 47 |
| 21 DNF | GT | 6 | (Germany) Konrad Motorsport | (Austria) Franz Konrad (Germany) Sascha Maassen | Porsche 3.6L Turbo Flat-6 | **D** | 47 |
| 22 DNF | N-GT | 66 | (Germany) Zentrum Rhein Oberberg | (Germany) Ralf Krauss (Germany) George Muller (Germany) Jürgen Alzen | Porsche 911 Carrera RSR | ? | 40 |
| 22 DNF | N-GT | 66 | (Germany) Zentrum Rhein Oberberg | (Germany) Ralf Krauss (Germany) George Muller (Germany) Jürgen Alzen | Porsche 3.8L Flat-6 | ? | 40 |
| 23 DNF | N-GT | 70 | (China) Gammon Repsol Megaspeed | (China) Samson Chan (Hong Kong) Alex Li (Hong Kong) Andrew Lo | Porsche 911 GT2 | ? | 23 |
| 23 DNF | N-GT | 70 | (China) Gammon Repsol Megaspeed | (China) Samson Chan (Hong Kong) Alex Li (Hong Kong) Andrew Lo | Porsche 3.6L Turbo Flat-6 | ? | 23 |
| 24 DNF | GT | 8 | (Switzerland) Elf Haberthur Racing | (Italy) Rino Mastronardi (France) Patrick Vuillaume (France) Jacques Corbet | Porsche 911 GT2 | **D** | 22 |
| 24 DNF | GT | 8 | (Switzerland) Elf Haberthur Racing | (Italy) Rino Mastronardi (France) Patrick Vuillaume (France) Jacques Corbet | Porsche 3.6L Turbo Flat-6 | **D** | 22 |
| 25 DNF | N-GT | 65 | (Germany) Jürgen Albert | (Germany) Jürgen Albert (Germany) Wolfgang Walter (Germany) Werner Prinz | Porsche 911 Carrera RSR | ? | 22 |
| 25 DNF | N-GT | 65 | (Germany) Jürgen Albert | (Germany) Jürgen Albert (Germany) Wolfgang Walter (Germany) Werner Prinz | Porsche 3.8L Flat-6 | ? | 22 |
| 26 DNF | N-GT | 71 | (China) FRD MW Racing Porsche | (China) David Louie (China) Stephen Chau (China) Chin Min Ma | Porsche 911 GT3 Cup | ? | 2 |
| 26 DNF | N-GT | 71 | (China) FRD MW Racing Porsche | (China) David Louie (China) Stephen Chau (China) Chin Min Ma | Porsche 3.6L Flat-6 | ? | 2 |
| DNS | N-GT | 61 | (United Kingdom) Cirtek Motorsport | (Germany) Jürgen Lorenz (United States) Ugo Colombo | Porsche 911 Carrera RSR | ? | – |
| DNS | N-GT | 61 | (United Kingdom) Cirtek Motorsport | (Germany) Jürgen Lorenz (United States) Ugo Colombo | Porsche 3.8L Flat-6 | ? | – |

== Statistics ==
- Pole position – #2 Viper Team Oreca – 1:47.576
- Fastest lap – #2 Viper Team Oreca – 1:47.717
- Average speed – 171.297 km/h

FIA GT Championship
| Previous race: 1999 FIA GT Watkins Glen 3 Hours | 1999 season | Next race: None |
