= 1999 FIA GT Donington 500km =

Layout of the Donington Park

The 1999 FIA GT Donington 500 km was the seventh round the 1999 FIA GT Championship season. It took place at Donington Park, United Kingdom, on 5 September 1999.

== Official results ==
Cars failing to complete 70% of winner's distance are marked as Not Classified (NC).

Pos	No	Team	Drivers	Chassis	Tyre	Laps
Pos	No	Team	Drivers	Engine	Tyre	Laps
1	1	(France) Chrysler Viper Team Oreca	(Monaco) Olivier Beretta (Austria) Karl Wendlinger	Chrysler Viper GTS-R	MI	111
1	1	(France) Chrysler Viper Team Oreca	(Monaco) Olivier Beretta (Austria) Karl Wendlinger	Chrysler 8.0L V10	MI	111
2	25	(United Kingdom) Lister Storm Racing	(United Kingdom) Julian Bailey (United Kingdom) Andy Wallace (United Kingdom) William Hewland	Lister Storm	MI	111
2	25	(United Kingdom) Lister Storm Racing	(United Kingdom) Julian Bailey (United Kingdom) Andy Wallace (United Kingdom) William Hewland	Jaguar 7.0L V12	MI	111
3	6	(Germany) Konrad Motorsport	(Austria) Franz Konrad (Germany) Sascha Maassen	Porsche 911 GT2	D	111
3	6	(Germany) Konrad Motorsport	(Austria) Franz Konrad (Germany) Sascha Maassen	Porsche 3.6L Turbo Flat-6	D	111
4	33	(Belgium) GLPK Racing	(Belgium) Vincent Vosse (Belgium) Didier Defourny	Chrysler Viper GTS-R	D	110
4	33	(Belgium) GLPK Racing	(Belgium) Vincent Vosse (Belgium) Didier Defourny	Chrysler 8.0L V10	D	110
5	19	(United Kingdom) Chamberlain Motorsport	(United Kingdom) Christian Vann (Germany) Christian Gläsel	Chrysler Viper GTS-R	MI	110
5	19	(United Kingdom) Chamberlain Motorsport	(United Kingdom) Christian Vann (Germany) Christian Gläsel	Chrysler 8.0L V10	MI	110
6	18	(United Kingdom) Chamberlain Motorsport	(Portugal) Ni Amorim (Switzerland) Toni Seiler	Chrysler Viper GTS-R	MI	110
6	18	(United Kingdom) Chamberlain Motorsport	(Portugal) Ni Amorim (Switzerland) Toni Seiler	Chrysler 8.0L V10	MI	110
7	21	(France) Paul Belmondo Racing	(France) Paul Belmondo (France) Claude Yves-Gosselin	Chrysler Viper GTS-R	D	108
7	21	(France) Paul Belmondo Racing	(France) Paul Belmondo (France) Claude Yves-Gosselin	Chrysler 8.0L V10	D	108
8	30	(United Kingdom) BVB	(United Kingdom) Martin Stretton (United Kingdom) Max Beaverbroock	Porsche 911 GT2	D	108
8	30	(United Kingdom) BVB	(United Kingdom) Martin Stretton (United Kingdom) Max Beaverbroock	Porsche 3.6L Turbo Flat-6	D	108
9	16	(Germany) Freisinger Motorsport	(Austria) Manfred Jurasz (Japan) Yukihiro Hane	Porsche 911 GT2	D	106
9	16	(Germany) Freisinger Motorsport	(Austria) Manfred Jurasz (Japan) Yukihiro Hane	Porsche 3.6L Turbo Flat-6	D	106
10	69	(Germany) Proton Competition	(Germany) Gerold Ried (Germany) Christian Ried	Porsche 911 GT2	Y	106
10	69	(Germany) Proton Competition	(Germany) Gerold Ried (Germany) Christian Ried	Porsche 3.6L Turbo Flat-6	Y	106
11	29	(Italy) Autorlando Sport	(Italy) Gabriele Sabatini (Italy) Marco Spinelli (Italy) Fabio Villa	Porsche 911 GT2	P	104
11	29	(Italy) Autorlando Sport	(Italy) Gabriele Sabatini (Italy) Marco Spinelli (Italy) Fabio Villa	Porsche 3.6L Turbo Flat-6	P	104
12	78	(Germany) Seikel Motorsport	(France) Xavier Pompidou (Italy) Paolo Rapetti (Morocco) Max Cohen-Olivar	Porsche 911 GT2	D	103
12	78	(Germany) Seikel Motorsport	(France) Xavier Pompidou (Italy) Paolo Rapetti (Morocco) Max Cohen-Olivar	Porsche 3.6L Turbo Flat-6	D	103
13	37	(United Kingdom) Cirtek Motorsport	(United Kingdom) Jonathan Baker (United Kingdom) Robert Schirle (Australia) Charlie Cox	Porsche 911 GT2	?	102
13	37	(United Kingdom) Cirtek Motorsport	(United Kingdom) Jonathan Baker (United Kingdom) Robert Schirle (Australia) Charlie Cox	Porsche 3.6L Turbo Flat-6	?	102
14	9	(Switzerland) Elf Haberthur Racing	(Italy) Mauro Casadei (Italy) Andrea Garbagnati (Switzerland) Massimo Cattori	Porsche 911 GT2	D	99
14	9	(Switzerland) Elf Haberthur Racing	(Italy) Mauro Casadei (Italy) Andrea Garbagnati (Switzerland) Massimo Cattori	Porsche 3.6L Turbo Flat-6	D	99
15	23	(France) Werner (France) Paul Belmondo Racing	(France) Francis Werner (France) Jacques Piattier	Porsche 911 GT2	D	94
15	23	(France) Werner (France) Paul Belmondo Racing	(France) Francis Werner (France) Jacques Piattier	Porsche 3.6L Turbo Flat-6	D	94
16	2	(France) Chrysler Viper Team Oreca	(France) Jean-Philippe Belloc (United Kingdom) Justin Bell	Chrysler Viper GTS-R	MI	79
16	2	(France) Chrysler Viper Team Oreca	(France) Jean-Philippe Belloc (United Kingdom) Justin Bell	Chrysler 8.0L V10	MI	79
17 DNF	15	(Germany) Freisinger Motorsport	(France) Michel Ligonnet (Germany) Wolfgang Kaufmann	Porsche 911 GT2	D	61
17 DNF	15	(Germany) Freisinger Motorsport	(France) Michel Ligonnet (Germany) Wolfgang Kaufmann	Porsche 3.6L Turbo Flat-6	D	61
18 DNF	77	(Germany) Seikel Motorsport	(New Zealand) Rob Wilson (United Kingdom) Richard Nearn	Porsche 911 GT2	D	45
18 DNF	77	(Germany) Seikel Motorsport	(New Zealand) Rob Wilson (United Kingdom) Richard Nearn	Porsche 3.6L Turbo Flat-6	D	45
19 DNF	22	(France) Paul Belmondo Racing	(France) Alain Filhol (Germany) Steffan Widmann (Netherlands) Mike Hezemans	Chrysler Viper GTS-R	D	36
19 DNF	22	(France) Paul Belmondo Racing	(France) Alain Filhol (Germany) Steffan Widmann (Netherlands) Mike Hezemans	Chrysler 8.0L V10	D	36
20 DNF	8	(Switzerland) Elf Haberthur Racing	(Italy) Luca Cappellari (Italy) Raffaele Sangiuolo (France) Patrick Vuillaume	Porsche 911 GT2	D	22
20 DNF	8	(Switzerland) Elf Haberthur Racing	(Italy) Luca Cappellari (Italy) Raffaele Sangiuolo (France) Patrick Vuillaume	Porsche 3.6L Turbo Flat-6	D	22
21 DNF	24	(Germany) RWS Motorsport	(Austria) Horst Felbermayr, Sr. (Austria) Horst Felbermayr, Jr.	Porsche 911 GT2	?	21
21 DNF	24	(Germany) RWS Motorsport	(Austria) Horst Felbermayr, Sr. (Austria) Horst Felbermayr, Jr.	Porsche 3.6L Turbo Flat-6	?	21

== Statistics ==
- Pole position – #25 Lister Storm Racing – 1:31.716
- Fastest lap – #1 Chrysler Viper Team Oreca – 1:33.338
- Average speed – 148.010 km/h

FIA GT Championship
Previous race: 1999 FIA GT Oschersleben 500km	1999 season	Next race: 1999 FIA GT Homestead 3 Hours
