= 1999 FIA GT Hockenheim 500km =

Sports car racing event in Baden-Württemberg, Germany

Layout of the Hockenheimring Short Circuit (1966–2001)

The 1999 FIA GT Hockenheim 500 km was the third round of the 1999 FIA GT Championship season. It took place at the Hockenheimring Short Circuit, Germany, on June 27, 1999.

== Official results ==
Cars failing to complete 70% of winner's distance are marked as Not Classified (NC).

Pos	No	Team	Drivers	Chassis	Tyre	Laps
Pos	No	Team	Drivers	Engine	Tyre	Laps
1	2	(France) Chrysler Viper Team Oreca	(France) Jean-Philippe Belloc (France) Dominique Dupuy	Chrysler Viper GTS-R	M	161
1	2	(France) Chrysler Viper Team Oreca	(France) Jean-Philippe Belloc (France) Dominique Dupuy	Chrysler 8.0L V10	M	161
2	1	(France) Chrysler Viper Team Oreca	(Italy) Luca Drudi (United Kingdom) Justin Bell	Chrysler Viper GTS-R	M	161
2	1	(France) Chrysler Viper Team Oreca	(Italy) Luca Drudi (United Kingdom) Justin Bell	Chrysler 8.0L V10	M	161
3	6	(Germany) Konrad Motorsport	(Austria) Franz Konrad (France) Bob Wollek	Porsche 911 GT2	D	159
3	6	(Germany) Konrad Motorsport	(Austria) Franz Konrad (France) Bob Wollek	Porsche 3.6L Turbo Flat-6	D	159
4	25	(United Kingdom) Lister Cars	(United Kingdom) Julian Bailey (United Kingdom) Tim Sugden (United Kingdom) Jamie Campbell-Walter	Lister Storm	M	159
4	25	(United Kingdom) Lister Cars	(United Kingdom) Julian Bailey (United Kingdom) Tim Sugden (United Kingdom) Jamie Campbell-Walter	Jaguar 7.0L V12	M	159
5	15	(Germany) Freisinger Motorsport	(France) Michel Ligonnet (Germany) Wolfgang Kaufmann	Porsche 911 GT2	D	158
5	15	(Germany) Freisinger Motorsport	(France) Michel Ligonnet (Germany) Wolfgang Kaufmann	Porsche 3.6L Turbo Flat-6	D	158
6	4	(Germany) Roock Racing	(Germany) André Ahrlé (Germany) Hubert Haupt	Porsche 911 GT2	Y	156
6	4	(Germany) Roock Racing	(Germany) André Ahrlé (Germany) Hubert Haupt	Porsche 3.6L Turbo Flat-6	Y	156
7	21	(France) Paul Belmondo Racing	(France) Paul Belmondo (France) Claude Yves-Gosselin	Chrysler Viper GTS-R	D	156
7	21	(France) Paul Belmondo Racing	(France) Paul Belmondo (France) Claude Yves-Gosselin	Chrysler 8.0L V10	D	156
8	8	(Switzerland) Elf Haberthur Racing	(Italy) Luca Cappellari (Belgium) Michel Neugarten (France) Patrice Goueslard	Porsche 911 GT2	D	155
8	8	(Switzerland) Elf Haberthur Racing	(Italy) Luca Cappellari (Belgium) Michel Neugarten (France) Patrice Goueslard	Porsche 3.6L Turbo Flat-6	D	155
9	5	(Germany) Roock Sportsystem	(Germany) Michael Eschmann (Germany) Paul Hulverscheid (Germany) Sascha Maassen	Porsche 911 GT2	Y	155
9	5	(Germany) Roock Sportsystem	(Germany) Michael Eschmann (Germany) Paul Hulverscheid (Germany) Sascha Maassen	Porsche 3.6L Turbo Flat-6	Y	155
10	10	(Netherlands) Marcos Racing International	(Netherlands) Cor Euser (Netherlands) Herman Buurman	Marcos Mantara LM600	D	155
10	10	(Netherlands) Marcos Racing International	(Netherlands) Cor Euser (Netherlands) Herman Buurman	Chevrolet 5.9L V8	D	155
11	9	(Switzerland) Elf Haberthur Racing	(Italy) Stefano Bucci (Italy) Mauro Casadei	Porsche 911 GT2	D	153
11	9	(Switzerland) Elf Haberthur Racing	(Italy) Stefano Bucci (Italy) Mauro Casadei	Porsche 3.6L Turbo Flat-6	D	153
12	19	(United Kingdom) Chamberlain Motorsport	(United Kingdom) Christian Vann (Germany) Christian Gläsel	Chrysler Viper GTS-R	M	153
12	19	(United Kingdom) Chamberlain Motorsport	(United Kingdom) Christian Vann (Germany) Christian Gläsel	Chrysler 8.0L V10	M	153
13	78	(Germany) Seikel Motorsport	(France) Jacques Schwach (France) Bernard Schwach (France) Didier van Straaten	Porsche 911 GT2	D	145
13	78	(Germany) Seikel Motorsport	(France) Jacques Schwach (France) Bernard Schwach (France) Didier van Straaten	Porsche 3.6L Turbo Flat-6	D	145
14	16	(Germany) Freisinger Motorsport	(Austria) Manfred Jurasz (Japan) Yukihiro Hane	Porsche 911 GT2	D	135
14	16	(Germany) Freisinger Motorsport	(Austria) Manfred Jurasz (Japan) Yukihiro Hane	Porsche 3.6L Turbo Flat-6	D	135
15	3	(Germany) Roock Racing	(Germany) Claudia Hürtgen (France) Stéphane Ortelli	Porsche 911 GT2	Y	125
15	3	(Germany) Roock Racing	(Germany) Claudia Hürtgen (France) Stéphane Ortelli	Porsche 3.6L Turbo Flat-6	Y	125
16	77	(Germany) Seikel Motorsport	(Germany) Ernst Palmberger (United Kingdom) Nigel Smith (United Kingdom) Richard Nearn	Porsche 911 GT2	D	114
16	77	(Germany) Seikel Motorsport	(Germany) Ernst Palmberger (United Kingdom) Nigel Smith (United Kingdom) Richard Nearn	Porsche 3.6L Turbo Flat-6	D	114
17 NC	23	(France) Werner (France) Paul Belmondo Racing	(France) Francis Werner (France) Jacques Piattier	Porsche 911 GT2	D	106
17 NC	23	(France) Werner (France) Paul Belmondo Racing	(France) Francis Werner (France) Jacques Piattier	Porsche 3.6L Turbo Flat-6	D	106
18 NC	69	(Germany) Proton Competition	(Germany) Gerold Ried (Germany) Christian Ried (France) Patrick Vuillaume	Porsche 911 GT2	Y	105
18 NC	69	(Germany) Proton Competition	(Germany) Gerold Ried (Germany) Christian Ried (France) Patrick Vuillaume	Porsche 3.6L Turbo Flat-6	Y	105
19 DNF	33	(Belgium) GLPK Racing	(Belgium) Vincent Vosse (Belgium) Didier Defourny	Chrysler Viper GTS-R	D	111
19 DNF	33	(Belgium) GLPK Racing	(Belgium) Vincent Vosse (Belgium) Didier Defourny	Chrysler 8.0L V10	D	111
20 DNF	24	(Germany) RWS Motorsport	(Austria) Horst Felbermayr Sr. (Austria) Horst Felbermayr Jr.	Porsche 911 GT2	?	106
20 DNF	24	(Germany) RWS Motorsport	(Austria) Horst Felbermayr Sr. (Austria) Horst Felbermayr Jr.	Porsche 3.6L Turbo Flat-6	?	106
21 DNF	34	(United Kingdom) Lister Cars	(Netherlands) Mike Hezemans (Netherlands) David Hart	Lister Storm	M	104
21 DNF	34	(United Kingdom) Lister Cars	(Netherlands) Mike Hezemans (Netherlands) David Hart	Jaguar 7.0L V12	M	104
22 DNF	22	(France) Paul Belmondo Racing	(France) Emmanuel Clérico (France) Marc Rostan (Germany) Steffan Widmann	Chrysler Viper GTS-R	D	103
22 DNF	22	(France) Paul Belmondo Racing	(France) Emmanuel Clérico (France) Marc Rostan (Germany) Steffan Widmann	Chrysler 8.0L V10	D	103
23 DNF	18	(United Kingdom) Chamberlain Motorsport	(Portugal) Ni Amorim (Switzerland) Toni Seiler	Chrysler Viper GTS-R	M	19
23 DNF	18	(United Kingdom) Chamberlain Motorsport	(Portugal) Ni Amorim (Switzerland) Toni Seiler	Chrysler 8.0L V10	M	19

== Statistics ==
- Pole position – #2 Chrysler Viper Team Oreca – 1:01.532
- Fastest lap – #2 Chrysler Viper Team Oreca – 1:03.505
- Average speed – 141.169 km/h

FIA GT Championship
Previous race: 1999 FIA GT Silverstone 500 miles	1999 season	Next race: 1999 FIA GT Budapest 500km
