= 1999 FIA GT Budapest 500km =

Fourth round of the 1999 FIA GT Championship season

Layout of the Hungaroring (1989-2002)

The 1999 FIA GT Budapest 500 km was the fourth round the 1999 FIA GT Championship season. It took place at the Hungaroring, Hungary, on 4 July 1999.

== Official results ==
Cars failing to complete 70% of winner's distance are marked as Not Classified (NC).

Pos	No	Team	Drivers	Chassis	Tyre	Laps
Pos	No	Team	Drivers	Engine	Tyre	Laps
1	2	(France) Chrysler Viper Team Oreca	(France) Jean-Philippe Belloc (France) Dominique Dupuy	Chrysler Viper GTS-R	MI	104
1	2	(France) Chrysler Viper Team Oreca	(France) Jean-Philippe Belloc (France) Dominique Dupuy	Chrysler 8.0L V10	MI	104
2	1	(France) Chrysler Viper Team Oreca	(Austria) Karl Wendlinger (Monaco) Olivier Beretta	Chrysler Viper GTS-R	MI	104
2	1	(France) Chrysler Viper Team Oreca	(Austria) Karl Wendlinger (Monaco) Olivier Beretta	Chrysler 8.0L V10	MI	104
3	6	(Germany) Konrad Motorsport	(Austria) Franz Konrad (France) Bob Wollek	Porsche 911 GT2	D	103
3	6	(Germany) Konrad Motorsport	(Austria) Franz Konrad (France) Bob Wollek	Porsche 3.6L Turbo Flat-6	D	103
4	18	(United Kingdom) Chamberlain Motorsport	(Portugal) Ni Amorim (Switzerland) Toni Seiler	Chrysler Viper GTS-R	MI	103
4	18	(United Kingdom) Chamberlain Motorsport	(Portugal) Ni Amorim (Switzerland) Toni Seiler	Chrysler 8.0L V10	MI	103
5	5	(Germany) Roock Sportsystem	(Germany) Michael Eschmann (Germany) Paul Hulverscheid (Germany) Sascha Maassen	Porsche 911 GT2	Y	103
5	5	(Germany) Roock Sportsystem	(Germany) Michael Eschmann (Germany) Paul Hulverscheid (Germany) Sascha Maassen	Porsche 3.6L Turbo Flat-6	Y	103
6	15	(Germany) Freisinger Motorsport	(France) Michel Ligonnet (Germany) Wolfgang Kaufmann	Porsche 911 GT2	D	103
6	15	(Germany) Freisinger Motorsport	(France) Michel Ligonnet (Germany) Wolfgang Kaufmann	Porsche 3.6L Turbo Flat-6	D	103
7	4	(Germany) Roock Racing	(Germany) André Ahrlé (Germany) Hubert Haupt	Porsche 911 GT2	Y	103
7	4	(Germany) Roock Racing	(Germany) André Ahrlé (Germany) Hubert Haupt	Porsche 3.6L Turbo Flat-6	Y	103
8	19	(United Kingdom) Chamberlain Motorsport	(United Kingdom) Christian Vann (Germany) Christian Gläsel	Chrysler Viper GTS-R	MI	102
8	19	(United Kingdom) Chamberlain Motorsport	(United Kingdom) Christian Vann (Germany) Christian Gläsel	Chrysler 8.0L V10	MI	102
9	22	(France) Paul Belmondo Racing	(Netherlands) Mike Hezemans (Germany) Steffan Widmann	Chrysler Viper GTS-R	D	102
9	22	(France) Paul Belmondo Racing	(Netherlands) Mike Hezemans (Germany) Steffan Widmann	Chrysler 8.0L V10	D	102
10	21	(France) Paul Belmondo Racing	(France) Paul Belmondo (France) Claude Yves-Gosselin (France) Emmanuel Clérico	Chrysler Viper GTS-R	D	102
10	21	(France) Paul Belmondo Racing	(France) Paul Belmondo (France) Claude Yves-Gosselin (France) Emmanuel Clérico	Chrysler 8.0L V10	D	102
11	77	(Germany) Seikel Motorsport	(Germany) Ernst Palmberger (United Kingdom) Nigel Smith (United Kingdom) Richard Nearn	Porsche 911 GT2	D	101
11	77	(Germany) Seikel Motorsport	(Germany) Ernst Palmberger (United Kingdom) Nigel Smith (United Kingdom) Richard Nearn	Porsche 3.6L Turbo Flat-6	D	101
12	8	(Switzerland) Elf Haberthur Racing	(Italy) Luca Cappellari (Belgium) Michel Neugarten (France) Patrice Goueslard	Porsche 911 GT2	D	101
12	8	(Switzerland) Elf Haberthur Racing	(Italy) Luca Cappellari (Belgium) Michel Neugarten (France) Patrice Goueslard	Porsche 3.6L Turbo Flat-6	D	101
13	33	(Belgium) GLPK Racing	(Belgium) Anthony Kumpen (Belgium) Jean-François Hemroulle	Chrysler Viper GTS-R	D	101
13	33	(Belgium) GLPK Racing	(Belgium) Anthony Kumpen (Belgium) Jean-François Hemroulle	Chrysler 8.0L V10	D	101
14	10	(Netherlands) Marcos Racing International	(Netherlands) Cor Euser (Netherlands) Herman Buurman	Marcos Mantara LM600	D	100
14	10	(Netherlands) Marcos Racing International	(Netherlands) Cor Euser (Netherlands) Herman Buurman	Chevrolet 5.9L V8	D	100
15	24	(Germany) RWS Motorsport	(Austria) Horst Felbermayr, Sr. (Austria) Horst Felbermayr, Jr.	Porsche 911 GT2	?	106
15	24	(Germany) RWS Motorsport	(Austria) Horst Felbermayr, Sr. (Austria) Horst Felbermayr, Jr.	Porsche 3.6L Turbo Flat-6	?	106
16	3	(Germany) Roock Racing	(Germany) Claudia Hürtgen (France) Stéphane Ortelli	Porsche 911 GT2	Y	99
16	3	(Germany) Roock Racing	(Germany) Claudia Hürtgen (France) Stéphane Ortelli	Porsche 3.6L Turbo Flat-6	Y	99
17	16	(Germany) Freisinger Motorsport	(Austria) Manfred Jurasz (Japan) Yukihiro Hane	Porsche 911 GT2	D	98
17	16	(Germany) Freisinger Motorsport	(Austria) Manfred Jurasz (Japan) Yukihiro Hane	Porsche 3.6L Turbo Flat-6	D	98
18	31	(France) Sonauto Levallois	(France) Jean-Pierre Jarier (France) François Lafon	Porsche 911 GT2	P	97
18	31	(France) Sonauto Levallois	(France) Jean-Pierre Jarier (France) François Lafon	Porsche 3.6L Turbo Flat-6	P	97
19	23	(France) Werner (France) Paul Belmondo Racing	(France) Francis Werner (France) Jacques Piattier (France) Philippe Auvray	Porsche 911 GT2	D	89
19	23	(France) Werner (France) Paul Belmondo Racing	(France) Francis Werner (France) Jacques Piattier (France) Philippe Auvray	Porsche 3.6L Turbo Flat-6	D	89
20	9	(Switzerland) Elf Haberthur Racing	(Italy) Stefano Bucci (Italy) Mauro Casadei (Italy) Andrea Garbagnati	Porsche 911 GT2	D	83
20	9	(Switzerland) Elf Haberthur Racing	(Italy) Stefano Bucci (Italy) Mauro Casadei (Italy) Andrea Garbagnati	Porsche 3.6L Turbo Flat-6	D	83
21 NC	78	(Germany) Seikel Motorsport	(France) Xavier Pompidou (Italy) Raffaele Sangiuolo (Morocco) Max Cohen-Olivar	Porsche 911 GT2	D	57
21 NC	78	(Germany) Seikel Motorsport	(France) Xavier Pompidou (Italy) Raffaele Sangiuolo (Morocco) Max Cohen-Olivar	Porsche 3.6L Turbo Flat-6	D	57
22 DNF	69	(Germany) Proton Competition	(Germany) Gerold Ried (Germany) Christian Ried (France) Patrick Vuillaume	Porsche 911 GT2	Y	24
22 DNF	69	(Germany) Proton Competition	(Germany) Gerold Ried (Germany) Christian Ried (France) Patrick Vuillaume	Porsche 3.6L Turbo Flat-6	Y	24
DNS	20	(Hungary) Bovi Motorsport	(Hungary) Attila Barta (Hungary) Kálmán Bódis (Hungary) Zoltan Zengo	Porsche 911 GT2	?	–
DNS	20	(Hungary) Bovi Motorsport	(Hungary) Attila Barta (Hungary) Kálmán Bódis (Hungary) Zoltan Zengo	Porsche 3.6L Turbo Flat-6	?	–

== Statistics ==
- Pole position – #1 Chrysler Viper Team Oreca – 1:38.862
- Fastest lap – #3 Roock Racing – 1:39.634
- Average speed – 136.357 km/h

FIA GT Championship
Previous race: 1999 FIA GT Hockenheim 500km	1999 season	Next race: 1999 FIA GT Zolder 500km
