= 1999 FIA GT Oschersleben 500km =

Layout of the Motorsport Arena Oschersleben

The 1999 FIA GT Oschersleben 500 km was the sixth round the 1999 FIA GT Championship season. It took place at the Motorsport Arena Oschersleben, Germany, on August 8, 1999.

== Official results ==
Cars failing to complete 70% of winner's distance are marked as Not Classified (NC).

| Pos | No | Team | Drivers | Chassis | Tyre | Laps |
| Pos | No | Team | Drivers | Engine | Tyre | Laps |
|---|---|---|---|---|---|---|
| 1 | 1 | (France) Chrysler Viper Team Oreca | (Monaco) Olivier Beretta (Austria) Karl Wendlinger | Chrysler Viper GTS-R | MI | 117 |
| 1 | 1 | (France) Chrysler Viper Team Oreca | (Monaco) Olivier Beretta (Austria) Karl Wendlinger | Chrysler 8.0L V10 | MI | 117 |
| 2 | 2 | (France) Chrysler Viper Team Oreca | (France) Jean-Philippe Belloc (Belgium) Marc Duez | Chrysler Viper GTS-R | MI | 117 |
| 2 | 2 | (France) Chrysler Viper Team Oreca | (France) Jean-Philippe Belloc (Belgium) Marc Duez | Chrysler 8.0L V10 | MI | 117 |
| 3 | 18 | (United Kingdom) Chamberlain Motorsport | (Portugal) Ni Amorim (Switzerland) Toni Seiler | Chrysler Viper GTS-R | MI | 117 |
| 3 | 18 | (United Kingdom) Chamberlain Motorsport | (Portugal) Ni Amorim (Switzerland) Toni Seiler | Chrysler 8.0L V10 | MI | 117 |
| 4 | 19 | (United Kingdom) Chamberlain Motorsport | (United Kingdom) Christian Vann (Germany) Christian Gläsel | Chrysler Viper GTS-R | MI | 117 |
| 4 | 19 | (United Kingdom) Chamberlain Motorsport | (United Kingdom) Christian Vann (Germany) Christian Gläsel | Chrysler 8.0L V10 | MI | 117 |
| 5 | 15 | (Germany) Freisinger Motorsport | (France) Michel Ligonnet (Germany) Wolfgang Kaufmann | Porsche 911 GT2 | D | 116 |
| 5 | 15 | (Germany) Freisinger Motorsport | (France) Michel Ligonnet (Germany) Wolfgang Kaufmann | Porsche 3.6L Turbo Flat-6 | D | 116 |
| 6 | 21 | (France) Paul Belmondo Racing | (France) Emmanuel Clérico (France) Claude Yves-Gosselin | Chrysler Viper GTS-R | D | 115 |
| 6 | 21 | (France) Paul Belmondo Racing | (France) Emmanuel Clérico (France) Claude Yves-Gosselin | Chrysler 8.0L V10 | D | 115 |
| 7 | 8 | (Switzerland) Elf Haberthur Racing | (Italy) Luca Cappellari (France) Patrick Vuillaume (Germany) Axel Röhr | Porsche 911 GT2 | D | 112 |
| 7 | 8 | (Switzerland) Elf Haberthur Racing | (Italy) Luca Cappellari (France) Patrick Vuillaume (Germany) Axel Röhr | Porsche 3.6L Turbo Flat-6 | D | 112 |
| 8 | 6 | (Germany) Konrad Motorsport | (Austria) Franz Konrad (France) Bob Wollek | Porsche 911 GT2 | D | 112 |
| 8 | 6 | (Germany) Konrad Motorsport | (Austria) Franz Konrad (France) Bob Wollek | Porsche 3.6L Turbo Flat-6 | D | 112 |
| 9 | 77 | (Germany) Seikel Motorsport | (Germany) Ernst Palmberger (United Kingdom) Nigel Smith (United Kingdom) Richard Nearn | Porsche 911 GT2 | D | 112 |
| 9 | 77 | (Germany) Seikel Motorsport | (Germany) Ernst Palmberger (United Kingdom) Nigel Smith (United Kingdom) Richard Nearn | Porsche 3.6L Turbo Flat-6 | D | 112 |
| 10 | 16 | (Germany) Freisinger Motorsport | (Austria) Manfred Jurasz (Japan) Yukihiro Hane | Porsche 911 GT2 | D | 112 |
| 10 | 16 | (Germany) Freisinger Motorsport | (Austria) Manfred Jurasz (Japan) Yukihiro Hane | Porsche 3.6L Turbo Flat-6 | D | 112 |
| 11 | 24 | (Germany) RWS Motorsport | (Austria) Horst Felbermayr, Sr. (Austria) Horst Felbermayr, Jr. | Porsche 911 GT2 | ? | 111 |
| 11 | 24 | (Germany) RWS Motorsport | (Austria) Horst Felbermayr, Sr. (Austria) Horst Felbermayr, Jr. | Porsche 3.6L Turbo Flat-6 | ? | 111 |
| 12 | 78 | (Germany) Seikel Motorsport | (Germany) Christian Vogler (Italy) Ruggero Grassi | Porsche 911 GT2 | D | 109 |
| 12 | 78 | (Germany) Seikel Motorsport | (Germany) Christian Vogler (Italy) Ruggero Grassi | Porsche 3.6L Turbo Flat-6 | D | 109 |
| 13 | 9 | (Switzerland) Elf Haberthur Racing | (Italy) Mauro Casadei (Italy) Roberto Mangifesta (Switzerland) Ivan Jacoma | Porsche 911 GT2 | D | 107 |
| 13 | 9 | (Switzerland) Elf Haberthur Racing | (Italy) Mauro Casadei (Italy) Roberto Mangifesta (Switzerland) Ivan Jacoma | Porsche 3.6L Turbo Flat-6 | D | 107 |
| 14 | 5 | (Germany) Eschmann (Germany) Roock Racing | (Germany) Sascha Maassen (Germany) Paul Hulverscheid (France) Stéphane Ortelli | Porsche 911 GT2 | Y | 102 |
| 14 | 5 | (Germany) Eschmann (Germany) Roock Racing | (Germany) Sascha Maassen (Germany) Paul Hulverscheid (France) Stéphane Ortelli | Porsche 3.6L Turbo Flat-6 | Y | 102 |
| 15 DNF | 35 | (Germany) Porsche Zentrum Regensburg | (Germany) Michael Trunk (Germany) Bernhard Müller | Porsche 911 Turbo | MI | 80 |
| 15 DNF | 35 | (Germany) Porsche Zentrum Regensburg | (Germany) Michael Trunk (Germany) Bernhard Müller | Porsche 3.6L Turbo Flat-6 | MI | 80 |
| 16 DNF | 36 | (Germany) Porsche Zentrum Regensburg | (Germany) Josef Jobst (Germany) Klaus Gebendorfer (Germany) Günther Kronseder | Porsche 911 GT3 Cup | MI | 69 |
| 16 DNF | 36 | (Germany) Porsche Zentrum Regensburg | (Germany) Josef Jobst (Germany) Klaus Gebendorfer (Germany) Günther Kronseder | Porsche 3.8L Flat-6 | MI | 69 |
| 17 DNF | 69 | (Germany) Proton Competition | (Germany) Gerold Ried (Germany) Christian Ried | Porsche 911 GT2 | Y | 58 |
| 17 DNF | 69 | (Germany) Proton Competition | (Germany) Gerold Ried (Germany) Christian Ried | Porsche 3.6L Turbo Flat-6 | Y | 58 |
| 18 DNF | 33 | (Belgium) GLPK Racing | (Belgium) Vincent Vosse (Belgium) Didier Defourny | Chrysler Viper GTS-R | D | 49 |
| 18 DNF | 33 | (Belgium) GLPK Racing | (Belgium) Vincent Vosse (Belgium) Didier Defourny | Chrysler 8.0L V10 | D | 49 |
| 19 DNF | 22 | (France) Paul Belmondo Racing | (France) Jean-Marc Gounon (Germany) Steffan Widmann | Chrysler Viper GTS-R | D | 25 |
| 19 DNF | 22 | (France) Paul Belmondo Racing | (France) Jean-Marc Gounon (Germany) Steffan Widmann | Chrysler 8.0L V10 | D | 25 |
| DNS | 10 | (Netherlands) Marcos Racing International | (Netherlands) Mike Hezemans (Netherlands) Herman Buurman | Marcos Mantara LM600 | D | – |
| DNS | 10 | (Netherlands) Marcos Racing International | (Netherlands) Mike Hezemans (Netherlands) Herman Buurman | Chevrolet 5.9L V8 | D | – |

== Statistics ==
- Pole position – #5 Eschmann – 1:26.457
- Fastest lap – #1 Chrysler Viper Team Oreca – 1:28.243
- Average speed – 142.912 km/h

FIA GT Championship
| Previous race: 1999 FIA GT Zolder 500km | 1999 season | Next race: 1999 FIA GT Donington 500km |
