= 1999 FIA GT Monza 500km =

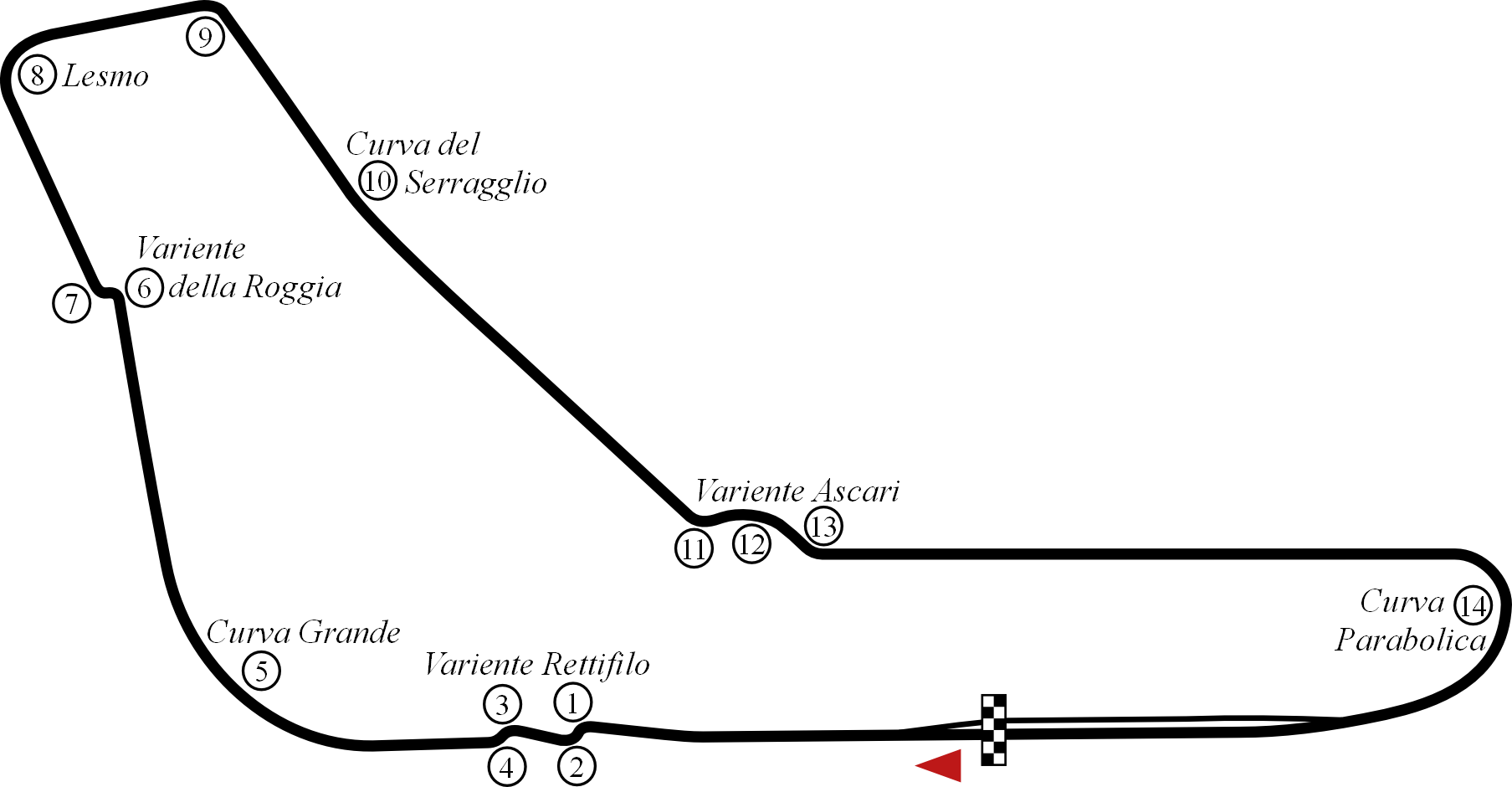
Layout of the Autodromo Nazionale Monza (1995-1999)

The 1999 FIA GT Monza 500 km was the opening round the 1999 FIA GT Championship season. It took place at the Autodromo Nazionale Monza, Italy, on April 11, 1999. This event was shared with a Sports Racing World Cup round.

== Official results ==
Cars failing to complete 70% of winner's distance are marked as Not Classified (NC).

Pos	No	Team	Drivers	Chassis	Tyre	Laps
Pos	No	Team	Drivers	Engine	Tyre	Laps
1	1	(France) Chrysler Viper Team Oreca	(Monaco) Olivier Beretta (Austria) Karl Wendlinger	Chrysler Viper GTS-R	MI	86
1	1	(France) Chrysler Viper Team Oreca	(Monaco) Olivier Beretta (Austria) Karl Wendlinger	Chrysler 8.0L V10	MI	86
2	2	(France) Chrysler Viper Team Oreca	(France) Jean-Philippe Belloc (United States) David Donohue	Chrysler Viper GTS-R	MI	86
2	2	(France) Chrysler Viper Team Oreca	(France) Jean-Philippe Belloc (United States) David Donohue	Chrysler 8.0L V10	MI	86
3	15	(Germany) Freisinger Motorsport	(France) Michel Ligonnet (Germany) Wolfgang Kaufmann	Porsche 911 GT2	D	85
3	15	(Germany) Freisinger Motorsport	(France) Michel Ligonnet (Germany) Wolfgang Kaufmann	Porsche 3.6L Turbo Flat-6	D	85
4	19	(United Kingdom) Chamberlain Motorsport	(United Kingdom) Christian Vann (Germany) Christian Gläsel	Chrysler Viper GTS-R	MI	85
4	19	(United Kingdom) Chamberlain Motorsport	(United Kingdom) Christian Vann (Germany) Christian Gläsel	Chrysler 8.0L V10	MI	85
5	33	(Belgium) GLPK Racing	(Belgium) Vincent Vosse (Belgium) Didier Defourny	Chrysler Viper GTS-R	D	85
5	33	(Belgium) GLPK Racing	(Belgium) Vincent Vosse (Belgium) Didier Defourny	Chrysler 8.0L V10	D	85
6	21	(France) Paul Belmondo Racing	(France) Paul Belmondo (France) Claude Yves-Gosselin	Chrysler Viper GTS-R	D	84
6	21	(France) Paul Belmondo Racing	(France) Paul Belmondo (France) Claude Yves-Gosselin	Chrysler 8.0L V10	D	84
7	8	(Switzerland) Haberthur Racing	(Italy) Luca Cappellari (Italy) Filippo Salvarni (Belgium) Michel Neugarten	Porsche 911 GT2	D	83
7	8	(Switzerland) Haberthur Racing	(Italy) Luca Cappellari (Italy) Filippo Salvarni (Belgium) Michel Neugarten	Porsche 3.6L Turbo Flat-6	D	83
8	3	(Germany) Roock Racing	(Germany) Claudia Hürtgen (France) Stéphane Ortelli	Porsche 911 GT2	Y	83
8	3	(Germany) Roock Racing	(Germany) Claudia Hürtgen (France) Stéphane Ortelli	Porsche 3.6L Turbo Flat-6	Y	83
9	29	(Italy) Autorlando	(Italy) Marco Spinelli (Italy) Fabio Villa (Italy) Gabriele Sabatini	Porsche 911 GT2	P	83
9	29	(Italy) Autorlando	(Italy) Marco Spinelli (Italy) Fabio Villa (Italy) Gabriele Sabatini	Porsche 3.6L Turbo Flat-6	P	83
10	77	(Germany) Seikel Motorsport	(Germany) Ernst Palmberger (United Kingdom) Nigel Smith (United Kingdom) Richard Nearn	Porsche 911 GT2	D	82
10	77	(Germany) Seikel Motorsport	(Germany) Ernst Palmberger (United Kingdom) Nigel Smith (United Kingdom) Richard Nearn	Porsche 3.6L Turbo Flat-6	D	82
11	4	(Germany) Roock Racing	(Germany) André Ahrlé (Germany) Hubert Haupt	Porsche 911 GT2	Y	82
11	4	(Germany) Roock Racing	(Germany) André Ahrlé (Germany) Hubert Haupt	Porsche 3.6L Turbo Flat-6	Y	82
12	24	(Germany) RWS Motorsport	(Austria) Horst Felbermayr, Sr. (Austria) Horst Felbermayr, Jr.	Porsche 911 GT2	?	81
12	24	(Germany) RWS Motorsport	(Austria) Horst Felbermayr, Sr. (Austria) Horst Felbermayr, Jr.	Porsche 3.6L Turbo Flat-6	?	81
13	10	(Netherlands) Marcos Racing International	(Netherlands) Cor Euser (Netherlands) Mike Hezemans	Marcos Mantara LM600	D	80
13	10	(Netherlands) Marcos Racing International	(Netherlands) Cor Euser (Netherlands) Mike Hezemans	Chevrolet 5.9L V8	D	80
14	9	(Switzerland) Haberthur Racing	(Italy) Stefano Bucci (Italy) Andrea Garbagnati (Italy) Mauro Casadei	Porsche 911 GT2	D	80
14	9	(Switzerland) Haberthur Racing	(Italy) Stefano Bucci (Italy) Andrea Garbagnati (Italy) Mauro Casadei	Porsche 3.6L Turbo Flat-6	D	80
15	6	(Germany) Konrad Motorsport	(Austria) Franz Konrad (France) Bob Wollek	Porsche 911 GT2	D	79
15	6	(Germany) Konrad Motorsport	(Austria) Franz Konrad (France) Bob Wollek	Porsche 3.6L Turbo Flat-6	D	79
16	26	(Italy) Grassi	(Italy) Ruggero Grassi (Italy) Anssi Münz	Porsche 911 GT2	?	79
16	26	(Italy) Grassi	(Italy) Ruggero Grassi (Italy) Anssi Münz	Porsche 3.6L Turbo Flat-6	?	79
17	78	(Germany) Seikel Motorsport	(Italy) Renato Mastropietro (Italy) Raffaele Sangiuolo (Italy) Claudio Padovani	Porsche 911 GT2	D	78
17	78	(Germany) Seikel Motorsport	(Italy) Renato Mastropietro (Italy) Raffaele Sangiuolo (Italy) Claudio Padovani	Porsche 3.6L Turbo Flat-6	D	78
18	27	(Italy) MAC Racing	(Italy) Luciano Tamburini (Italy) Ruggero Melgrati	Porsche 911	?	77
18	27	(Italy) MAC Racing	(Italy) Luciano Tamburini (Italy) Ruggero Melgrati	Porsche 3.4L Flat-6	?	77
19	16	(Germany) Freisinger Motorsport	(Austria) Manfred Jurasz (Australia) Ray Lintott	Porsche 911 GT2	D	76
19	16	(Germany) Freisinger Motorsport	(Austria) Manfred Jurasz (Australia) Ray Lintott	Porsche 3.6L Turbo Flat-6	D	76
20	20	(Hungary) Bovi Motorsport	(Hungary) Attila Barta (Hungary) Ferenc Rátkai (Hungary) Kálmán Bódis	Porsche 911 GT2	?	70
20	20	(Hungary) Bovi Motorsport	(Hungary) Attila Barta (Hungary) Ferenc Rátkai (Hungary) Kálmán Bódis	Porsche 3.6L Turbo Flat-6	?	70
21	5	(Germany) Roock Sportsystem	(Germany) Michael Eschmann (United Kingdom) Hugh Price (United Kingdom) John Robinson	Porsche 911 GT2	Y	62
21	5	(Germany) Roock Sportsystem	(Germany) Michael Eschmann (United Kingdom) Hugh Price (United Kingdom) John Robinson	Porsche 3.6L Turbo Flat-6	Y	62
22 DNF	22	(France) Paul Belmondo Racing	(France) Emmanuel Clérico (Switzerland) Christophe Pillon	Chrysler Viper GTS-R	D	52
22 DNF	22	(France) Paul Belmondo Racing	(France) Emmanuel Clérico (Switzerland) Christophe Pillon	Chrysler 8.0L V10	D	52
23 DNF	25	(United Kingdom) Lister Cars	(United Kingdom) Julian Bailey (United Kingdom) Tiff Needell (United Kingdom) Bobby Verdon-Roe	Lister Storm	MI	33
23 DNF	25	(United Kingdom) Lister Cars	(United Kingdom) Julian Bailey (United Kingdom) Tiff Needell (United Kingdom) Bobby Verdon-Roe	Jaguar 7.0L V12	MI	33
24 DNF	28	(Italy) Ebimotors	(Italy) Fabio Babini (Italy) Massimo Frigerio	Porsche 911 GT2	?	27
24 DNF	28	(Italy) Ebimotors	(Italy) Fabio Babini (Italy) Massimo Frigerio	Porsche 3.6L Turbo Flat-6	?	27
25 DNF	69	(Germany) Proton Competition	(Germany) Gerold Ried (Germany) Christian Ried (France) Patrick Vuillaume	Porsche 911 GT2	Y	25
25 DNF	69	(Germany) Proton Competition	(Germany) Gerold Ried (Germany) Christian Ried (France) Patrick Vuillaume	Porsche 3.6L Turbo Flat-6	Y	25
26 DNF	18	(United Kingdom) Chamberlain Motorsport	(Portugal) Ni Amorim (United Kingdom) Will Hoy	Chrysler Viper GTS-R	MI	6
26 DNF	18	(United Kingdom) Chamberlain Motorsport	(Portugal) Ni Amorim (United Kingdom) Will Hoy	Chrysler 8.0L V10	MI	6

== Statistics ==
- Pole position – #1 Chrysler Viper Team Oreca – 1:45.344
- Fastest lap – #1 Chrysler Viper Team Oreca – 1:46.278
- Average speed – 185.704 km/h

FIA GT Championship
Previous race: None	1999 season	Next race: 1999 FIA GT Silverstone 500 miles
