= 1999 FIA GT Championship =

Motor racing championship

Seasons
- ← 1998 2000 →

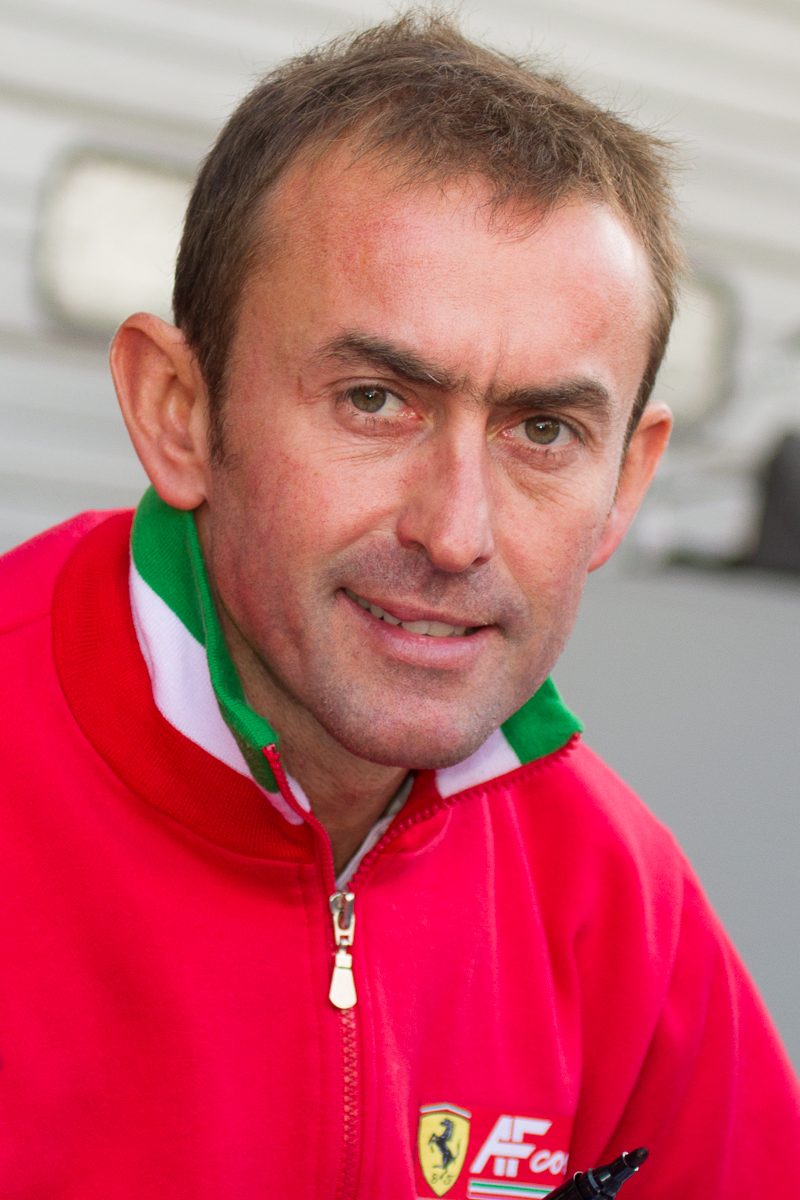
Olivier Beretta of Monaco won his second consecutive FIA GT Drivers' Championship in 1999

The 1999 FIA GT Championship was the third season of FIA GT Championship, an auto racing series endorsed by the Fédération Internationale de l'Automobile (FIA) and organized by the Stéphane Ratel Organisation (SRO). The races featured grand touring cars and awarded a drivers and teams championship. The season began on 11 April 1999 and ended 26 November 1999 after ten races in Europe, the United States, and China.

Following the domination of Mercedes-Benz the previous two seasons, pre-season entries for the GT1 category were so few that the FIA and SRO chose to eliminate the class for 1999. The former GT2 class became the sole category of cars eligible for the championships, although cars from national championships were allowed to participate on an invitational basis at some events. Chrysler Viper Team Oreca dominated the championship for the entire season, winning all but one race en route to the Teams title. Olivier Beretta won his second-consecutive championship, sharing the Drivers title with teammate Karl Wendlinger, earning six of Oreca's nine race victories.

== Schedule ==
For the first time in the history of both the FIA GT Championship and its predecessor series, the BPR Global GT Endurance Championship, a 1,000 km (620 mi) endurance race was not part of the season as the 1000 km Suzuka was dropped from the schedule, instead all races were held to a 500 km (310 mi) distance. The Japanese event was replaced by a race at the Zhuhai International Circuit, which the BPR series had visited in 1996. Dijon-Prenois was also not retained from 1998, replaced by the Zolder and Monza, which started the season. The series initially planned to retain the A1-Ring before the event was replaced by a second American event at Watkins Glen. The two American rounds were intended to be run in conjunction with the United States Road Racing Championship before the series was canceled in the summer of 1999, although American teams were invited to participate as non-scoring entries.

Rnd	Race	Circuit	Date
1	Aprimatic Trophy	Autodromo Nazionale Monza, Monza, Italy	11 April
2	P&O Stena Line Silverstone 500	Silverstone Circuit, Silverstone, United Kingdom	9 May
3	Hockenheim 500	Hockenheimring, Hockenheim, Germany	27 June
4	Hungaroring 500	Hungaroring, Mogyoród, Hungary	4 July
5	Castrol Belcar FIA GT	Zolder Circuit, Heusden-Zolder, Belgium	18 July
6	Oschersleben 500	Motopark Oschersleben, Oschersleben, Germany	8 August
7	International Car Races	Donington Park, Leicestershire, United Kingdom	5 September
8	Miami 500	Homestead-Miami Speedway, Homestead, United States	26 September
9	Bosch Sports Car Oktoberfest	Watkins Glen International, Watkins Glen, United States	3 October
10	Zhuhai 500	Zhuhai International Circuit, Zhuhai, China	28 November

== Entries ==
Entrant	Car	Engine	Tyre	No.	Drivers	Rounds
(France) Chrysler Viper Team Oreca	Chrysler Viper GTS-R	Chrysler 356-T6 8.0 L V10	M	1	(Monaco) Olivier Beretta	1–2, 4–10
(France) Chrysler Viper Team Oreca	Chrysler Viper GTS-R	Chrysler 356-T6 8.0 L V10	M	1	(Austria) Karl Wendlinger	1–2, 4–10
(France) Chrysler Viper Team Oreca	Chrysler Viper GTS-R	Chrysler 356-T6 8.0 L V10	M	1	(Italy) Luca Drudi	3
(France) Chrysler Viper Team Oreca	Chrysler Viper GTS-R	Chrysler 356-T6 8.0 L V10	M	1	(United Kingdom) Justin Bell	3
(France) Chrysler Viper Team Oreca	Chrysler Viper GTS-R	Chrysler 356-T6 8.0 L V10	M	2	(France) Jean-Philippe Belloc	All
(France) Chrysler Viper Team Oreca	Chrysler Viper GTS-R	Chrysler 356-T6 8.0 L V10	M	2	(United States) David Donohue	1–2, 8–9
(France) Chrysler Viper Team Oreca	Chrysler Viper GTS-R	Chrysler 356-T6 8.0 L V10	M	2	(United Kingdom) Justin Bell	2, 7
(France) Chrysler Viper Team Oreca	Chrysler Viper GTS-R	Chrysler 356-T6 8.0 L V10	M	2	(France) Dominique Dupuy	3–4
(France) Chrysler Viper Team Oreca	Chrysler Viper GTS-R	Chrysler 356-T6 8.0 L V10	M	2	(Belgium) Marc Duez	5–6
(France) Chrysler Viper Team Oreca	Chrysler Viper GTS-R	Chrysler 356-T6 8.0 L V10	M	2	(Belgium) Vincent Vosse	10
(Germany) Roock Racing	Porsche 911 GT2	Porsche 3.6 L Turbo Flat-6	Y	3	(Monaco) Stéphane Ortelli	1–4
(Germany) Roock Racing	Porsche 911 GT2	Porsche 3.6 L Turbo Flat-6	Y	3	(Germany) Claudia Hürtgen	1–4
(Germany) Roock Racing	Porsche 911 GT2	Porsche 3.6 L Turbo Flat-6	Y	3	(United Kingdom) Adam Topping	10
(Germany) Roock Racing	Porsche 911 GT2	Porsche 3.6 L Turbo Flat-6	Y	3	(United Kingdom) Robert Schirle	10
(Germany) Roock Racing	Porsche 911 GT2	Porsche 3.6 L Turbo Flat-6	Y	3	(United States) Ugo Colombo	10
(Germany) Roock Racing	Porsche 911 GT2	Porsche 3.6 L Turbo Flat-6	Y	4	(Germany) André Ahrlé	1–5
(Germany) Roock Racing	Porsche 911 GT2	Porsche 3.6 L Turbo Flat-6	Y	4	(Germany) Hubert Haupt	1–5
(Germany) Roock Racing	Porsche 911 GT2	Porsche 3.6 L Turbo Flat-6	Y	4	(Germany) Claudia Hürtgen	5
(Germany) Roock Sportsystem (Germany) Michael Eschmann	Porsche 911 GT2	Porsche 3.6 L Turbo Flat-6	Y	5	(Germany) Michael Eschmann	1–4
(Germany) Roock Sportsystem (Germany) Michael Eschmann	Porsche 911 GT2	Porsche 3.6 L Turbo Flat-6	Y	5	(United Kingdom) Hugh Price	1
(Germany) Roock Sportsystem (Germany) Michael Eschmann	Porsche 911 GT2	Porsche 3.6 L Turbo Flat-6	Y	5	(United Kingdom) John Robinson	1
(Germany) Roock Sportsystem (Germany) Michael Eschmann	Porsche 911 GT2	Porsche 3.6 L Turbo Flat-6	Y	5	(Germany) Paul Hulverscheid	2–4, 6
(Germany) Roock Sportsystem (Germany) Michael Eschmann	Porsche 911 GT2	Porsche 3.6 L Turbo Flat-6	Y	5	(Germany) Sascha Maassen	3–4, 6
(Germany) Roock Sportsystem (Germany) Michael Eschmann	Porsche 911 GT2	Porsche 3.6 L Turbo Flat-6	Y	5	(Belgium) Ben Lievens	5
(Germany) Roock Sportsystem (Germany) Michael Eschmann	Porsche 911 GT2	Porsche 3.6 L Turbo Flat-6	Y	5	(Belgium) Michel Meers	5
(Germany) Roock Sportsystem (Germany) Michael Eschmann	Porsche 911 GT2	Porsche 3.6 L Turbo Flat-6	Y	5	(Monaco) Stéphane Ortelli	6
(Germany) Roock Sportsystem (Germany) Michael Eschmann	Porsche 911 GT2	Porsche 3.6 L Turbo Flat-6	Y	32	(Italy) Raffaele Sangiuolo	2
(Germany) Roock Sportsystem (Germany) Michael Eschmann	Porsche 911 GT2	Porsche 3.6 L Turbo Flat-6	Y	32	(United Kingdom) John Robinson	2
(Germany) Roock Sportsystem (Germany) Michael Eschmann	Porsche 911 GT2	Porsche 3.6 L Turbo Flat-6	Y	32	(United Kingdom) Hugh Price	2
(Germany) Konrad Motorsport	Porsche 911 GT2	Porsche 3.6 L Turbo Flat-6	D	6	(Austria) Franz Konrad	All
(Germany) Konrad Motorsport	Porsche 911 GT2	Porsche 3.6 L Turbo Flat-6	D	6	(France) Bob Wollek	1, 3–4, 6
(Germany) Konrad Motorsport	Porsche 911 GT2	Porsche 3.6 L Turbo Flat-6	D	6	(Netherlands) Mike Hezemans	2, 8–9
(Germany) Konrad Motorsport	Porsche 911 GT2	Porsche 3.6 L Turbo Flat-6	D	6	(Germany) Altfrid Heger	5
(Germany) Konrad Motorsport	Porsche 911 GT2	Porsche 3.6 L Turbo Flat-6	D	6	(Germany) Sascha Maassen	7, 10
(Germany) Konrad Motorsport	Porsche 911 GT2	Porsche 3.6 L Turbo Flat-6	D	7	(United States) Charles Slater	8–9
(Germany) Konrad Motorsport	Porsche 911 GT2	Porsche 3.6 L Turbo Flat-6	D	7	(United States) Ugo Colombo	8
(Germany) Konrad Motorsport	Porsche 911 GT2	Porsche 3.6 L Turbo Flat-6	D	7	(Spain) Jesús Diez de Villarroel	9
(Germany) Konrad Motorsport	Porsche 911 GT2	Porsche 3.6 L Turbo Flat-6	D	7	(Germany) Peter Worm	10
(Germany) Konrad Motorsport	Porsche 911 GT2	Porsche 3.6 L Turbo Flat-6	D	7	(Italy) Batti Pregliasco	10
(Switzerland) Haberthur Racing	Porsche 911 GT2	Porsche 3.6 L Turbo Flat-6	D	8	(Italy) Luca Cappellari	1–9
(Switzerland) Haberthur Racing	Porsche 911 GT2	Porsche 3.6 L Turbo Flat-6	D	8	(Belgium) Michel Neugarten	1, 3–5
(Switzerland) Haberthur Racing	Porsche 911 GT2	Porsche 3.6 L Turbo Flat-6	D	8	(Italy) Filippo Salvarni	1
(Switzerland) Haberthur Racing	Porsche 911 GT2	Porsche 3.6 L Turbo Flat-6	D	8	(Italy) Angelo Zadra	2
(Switzerland) Haberthur Racing	Porsche 911 GT2	Porsche 3.6 L Turbo Flat-6	D	8	(France) Patrice Goueslard	2–4
(Switzerland) Haberthur Racing	Porsche 911 GT2	Porsche 3.6 L Turbo Flat-6	D	8	(Italy) Marco Spinelli	5
(Switzerland) Haberthur Racing	Porsche 911 GT2	Porsche 3.6 L Turbo Flat-6	D	8	(France) Patrick Vuillaume	6–10
(Switzerland) Haberthur Racing	Porsche 911 GT2	Porsche 3.6 L Turbo Flat-6	D	8	(Germany) Axel Röhr	6
(Switzerland) Haberthur Racing	Porsche 911 GT2	Porsche 3.6 L Turbo Flat-6	D	8	(Italy) Raffaele Sangiuolo	7
(Switzerland) Haberthur Racing	Porsche 911 GT2	Porsche 3.6 L Turbo Flat-6	D	8	(Italy) Paolo Rapetti	8
(Switzerland) Haberthur Racing	Porsche 911 GT2	Porsche 3.6 L Turbo Flat-6	D	8	(United States) David Kicak	9
(Switzerland) Haberthur Racing	Porsche 911 GT2	Porsche 3.6 L Turbo Flat-6	D	8	(Italy) Rino Mastronardi	10
(Switzerland) Haberthur Racing	Porsche 911 GT2	Porsche 3.6 L Turbo Flat-6	D	8	(France) Jacques Corbet	10
(Switzerland) Haberthur Racing	Porsche 911 GT2	Porsche 3.6 L Turbo Flat-6	D	9	(Italy) Mauro Casadei	All
(Switzerland) Haberthur Racing	Porsche 911 GT2	Porsche 3.6 L Turbo Flat-6	D	9	(Italy) Stefano Bucci	1–4
(Switzerland) Haberthur Racing	Porsche 911 GT2	Porsche 3.6 L Turbo Flat-6	D	9	(Italy) Andrea Garbagnati	1–2, 4, 7–10
(Switzerland) Haberthur Racing	Porsche 911 GT2	Porsche 3.6 L Turbo Flat-6	D	9	(France) Patrick Vuillaume	5
(Switzerland) Haberthur Racing	Porsche 911 GT2	Porsche 3.6 L Turbo Flat-6	D	9	(Italy) Raffaele Sangiuolo	5
(Switzerland) Haberthur Racing	Porsche 911 GT2	Porsche 3.6 L Turbo Flat-6	D	9	(Italy) Roberto Mangifesta	6
(Switzerland) Haberthur Racing	Porsche 911 GT2	Porsche 3.6 L Turbo Flat-6	D	9	(Switzerland) Ivan Jacoma	6
(Switzerland) Haberthur Racing	Porsche 911 GT2	Porsche 3.6 L Turbo Flat-6	D	9	(Switzerland) Massimo Cattori	7
(Netherlands) Marcos Racing International	Marcos LM600	Chevrolet 5.9 L V8	D	10	(Netherlands) Cor Euser	1, 3–4
(Netherlands) Marcos Racing International	Marcos LM600	Chevrolet 5.9 L V8	D	10	(Netherlands) Mike Hezemans	1, 6
(Netherlands) Marcos Racing International	Marcos LM600	Chevrolet 5.9 L V8	D	10	(Netherlands) Herman Buurman	3–4, 6
(Netherlands) Marcos Racing International	Marcos LM600	Chevrolet 5.9 L V8	D	10	(Belgium) Vincent Dupont	5
(Netherlands) Marcos Racing International	Marcos LM600	Chevrolet 5.9 L V8	D	10	(Belgium) Hans Willems	5
(Netherlands) Marcos Racing International	Marcos LM600	Chevrolet 5.9 L V8	D	11	(Netherlands) Cor Euser	5
(Netherlands) Marcos Racing International	Marcos LM600	Chevrolet 5.9 L V8	D	11	(Netherlands) Herman Buurman	5
(Germany) Freisinger Motorsport	Porsche 911 GT2	Porsche 3.6 L Turbo Flat-6	D	15	(Germany) Wolfgang Kaufmann	All
(Germany) Freisinger Motorsport	Porsche 911 GT2	Porsche 3.6 L Turbo Flat-6	D	15	(France) Michel Ligonnet	1–7
(Germany) Freisinger Motorsport	Porsche 911 GT2	Porsche 3.6 L Turbo Flat-6	D	15	(France) Bob Wollek	8–10
(Germany) Freisinger Motorsport	Porsche 911 GT2	Porsche 3.6 L Turbo Flat-6	D	16	(Austria) Manfred Jurasz	All
(Germany) Freisinger Motorsport	Porsche 911 GT2	Porsche 3.6 L Turbo Flat-6	D	16	(Australia) Ray Lintott	1
(Germany) Freisinger Motorsport	Porsche 911 GT2	Porsche 3.6 L Turbo Flat-6	D	16	(France) Luis Marques	2
(Germany) Freisinger Motorsport	Porsche 911 GT2	Porsche 3.6 L Turbo Flat-6	D	16	(Japan) Yukihiro Hane	3–7, 9–10
(Germany) Freisinger Motorsport	Porsche 911 GT2	Porsche 3.6 L Turbo Flat-6	D	16	(United States) Lance Stewart	8
(United Kingdom) Chamberlain Motorsport	Chrysler Viper GTS-R	Chrysler 356-T6 8.0 L V10	M	18	(Portugal) Ni Amorim	1–7, 10
(United Kingdom) Chamberlain Motorsport	Chrysler Viper GTS-R	Chrysler 356-T6 8.0 L V10	M	18	(United Kingdom) Will Hoy	1–2
(United Kingdom) Chamberlain Motorsport	Chrysler Viper GTS-R	Chrysler 356-T6 8.0 L V10	M	18	(Switzerland) Toni Seiler	2–7
(United Kingdom) Chamberlain Motorsport	Chrysler Viper GTS-R	Chrysler 356-T6 8.0 L V10	M	18	(Belgium) Vincent Vosse	8–9
(United Kingdom) Chamberlain Motorsport	Chrysler Viper GTS-R	Chrysler 356-T6 8.0 L V10	M	18	(France) Xavier Pompidou	8–9
(United Kingdom) Chamberlain Motorsport	Chrysler Viper GTS-R	Chrysler 356-T6 8.0 L V10	M	18	(Netherlands) Hans Hugenholtz Jr.	8, 10
(United Kingdom) Chamberlain Motorsport	Chrysler Viper GTS-R	Chrysler 356-T6 8.0 L V10	M	18	(France) Michel Ligonnet	9–10
(United Kingdom) Chamberlain Motorsport	Chrysler Viper GTS-R	Chrysler 356-T6 8.0 L V10	M	19	(United Kingdom) Christian Vann	All
(United Kingdom) Chamberlain Motorsport	Chrysler Viper GTS-R	Chrysler 356-T6 8.0 L V10	M	19	(Germany) Christian Gläsel	All
(United Kingdom) Chamberlain Motorsport	Chrysler Viper GTS-R	Chrysler 356-T6 8.0 L V10	M	19	(Netherlands) Hans Hugenholtz Jr.	2
(Hungary) Bovi Motorsport	Porsche 911 GT2	Porsche 3.6 L Turbo Flat-6		20	(Hungary) Attila Barta	1, 4
(Hungary) Bovi Motorsport	Porsche 911 GT2	Porsche 3.6 L Turbo Flat-6		20	(Hungary) Kálmán Bódis	1, 4
(Hungary) Bovi Motorsport	Porsche 911 GT2	Porsche 3.6 L Turbo Flat-6		20	(Hungary) Ferenc Rátkai	1
(Hungary) Bovi Motorsport	Porsche 911 GT2	Porsche 3.6 L Turbo Flat-6		20	(Hungary) Zoltán Zengő	4
(France) Paul Belmondo Racing	Chrysler Viper GTS-R	Chrysler 356-T6 8.0 L V10	D	21	(France) Claude-Yves Gosselin	1–7
(France) Paul Belmondo Racing	Chrysler Viper GTS-R	Chrysler 356-T6 8.0 L V10	D	21	(France) Paul Belmondo	1–5, 7–10
(France) Paul Belmondo Racing	Chrysler Viper GTS-R	Chrysler 356-T6 8.0 L V10	D	21	(France) Marc Rostan	2
(France) Paul Belmondo Racing	Chrysler Viper GTS-R	Chrysler 356-T6 8.0 L V10	D	21	(France) Emmanuel Clérico	4, 6, 8
(France) Paul Belmondo Racing	Chrysler Viper GTS-R	Chrysler 356-T6 8.0 L V10	D	21	(Italy) Luca Drudi	9
(France) Paul Belmondo Racing	Chrysler Viper GTS-R	Chrysler 356-T6 8.0 L V10	D	21	(France) Dominique Dupuy	10
(France) Paul Belmondo Racing	Chrysler Viper GTS-R	Chrysler 356-T6 8.0 L V10	D	22	(France) Emmanuel Clérico	1, 3
(France) Paul Belmondo Racing	Chrysler Viper GTS-R	Chrysler 356-T6 8.0 L V10	D	22	(Switzerland) Christophe Pillon	1
(France) Paul Belmondo Racing	Chrysler Viper GTS-R	Chrysler 356-T6 8.0 L V10	D	22	(Germany) Steffan Widmann	3–7
(France) Paul Belmondo Racing	Chrysler Viper GTS-R	Chrysler 356-T6 8.0 L V10	D	22	(France) Marc Rostan	3, 8
(France) Paul Belmondo Racing	Chrysler Viper GTS-R	Chrysler 356-T6 8.0 L V10	D	22	(Netherlands) Mike Hezemans	4, 7
(France) Paul Belmondo Racing	Chrysler Viper GTS-R	Chrysler 356-T6 8.0 L V10	D	22	(United Kingdom) Alex Portman	5
(France) Paul Belmondo Racing	Chrysler Viper GTS-R	Chrysler 356-T6 8.0 L V10	D	22	(France) Jean-Marc Gounon	6
(France) Paul Belmondo Racing	Chrysler Viper GTS-R	Chrysler 356-T6 8.0 L V10	D	22	(France) Alain Filhol	7
(France) Paul Belmondo Racing	Chrysler Viper GTS-R	Chrysler 356-T6 8.0 L V10	D	22	(Canada) "Raël"	8–9
(France) Paul Belmondo Racing	Chrysler Viper GTS-R	Chrysler 356-T6 8.0 L V10	D	22	(United States) Steve Pfeffer	9
(France) Werner	Porsche 911 GT2	Porsche 3.6 L Turbo Flat-6	D	23	(France) Francis Werner	2–5, 7
(France) Werner	Porsche 911 GT2	Porsche 3.6 L Turbo Flat-6	D	23	(France) Jacques Piattier	2–5, 7
(France) Werner	Porsche 911 GT2	Porsche 3.6 L Turbo Flat-6	D	23	(France) Philippe Auvray	2, 4–5
(Germany) RWS	Porsche 911 GT2	Porsche 3.6 L Turbo Flat-6		24	(Austria) Horst Felbermayr	1–7
(Germany) RWS	Porsche 911 GT2	Porsche 3.6 L Turbo Flat-6		24	(Austria) Horst Felbermayr Jr.	1–7
(United Kingdom) Lister Storm Racing	Lister Storm GT2	Jaguar 7.0 L V12	M	25	(United Kingdom) Julian Bailey	1–3, 5, 7
(United Kingdom) Lister Storm Racing	Lister Storm GT2	Jaguar 7.0 L V12	M	25	(United Kingdom) Bobby Verdon-Roe	1–2
(United Kingdom) Lister Storm Racing	Lister Storm GT2	Jaguar 7.0 L V12	M	25	(United Kingdom) Tiff Needell	1–2
(United Kingdom) Lister Storm Racing	Lister Storm GT2	Jaguar 7.0 L V12	M	25	(United Kingdom) Jamie Campbell-Walter	3, 5
(United Kingdom) Lister Storm Racing	Lister Storm GT2	Jaguar 7.0 L V12	M	25	(United Kingdom) Tim Sugden	3
(United Kingdom) Lister Storm Racing	Lister Storm GT2	Jaguar 7.0 L V12	M	25	(United Kingdom) Andy Wallace	5, 7
(United Kingdom) Lister Storm Racing	Lister Storm GT2	Jaguar 7.0 L V12	M	25	(United Kingdom) William Hewland	7
(United Kingdom) Lister Storm Racing	Lister Storm GT2	Jaguar 7.0 L V12	M	34	(Netherlands) Mike Hezemans	3, 5
(United Kingdom) Lister Storm Racing	Lister Storm GT2	Jaguar 7.0 L V12	M	34	(Netherlands) David Hart	3, 5
(Italy) Ruggero Grassi	Porsche 911 GT2	Porsche 3.6 L Turbo Flat-6		26	(Italy) Ruggero Grassi	1
(Italy) Ruggero Grassi	Porsche 911 GT2	Porsche 3.6 L Turbo Flat-6		26	(Italy) Anssi Münz	1
(Italy) MAC Racing	Porsche 911	Porsche 3.4 L Flat-6		27	(Italy) Luciano Tamburini	1
(Italy) MAC Racing	Porsche 911	Porsche 3.4 L Flat-6		27	(Italy) Ruggero Melgrati	1
(Italy) Ebimotors	Porsche 911 GT2	Porsche 3.6 L Turbo Flat-6		28	(Italy) Fabio Babini	1
(Italy) Ebimotors	Porsche 911 GT2	Porsche 3.6 L Turbo Flat-6		28	(Italy) Massimo Frigerio	1
(Italy) Autorlando	Porsche 911 GT2	Porsche 3.6 L Turbo Flat-6	P	29	(Italy) Marco Spinelli	1, 7
(Italy) Autorlando	Porsche 911 GT2	Porsche 3.6 L Turbo Flat-6	P	29	(Italy) Fabio Villa	1, 7
(Italy) Autorlando	Porsche 911 GT2	Porsche 3.6 L Turbo Flat-6	P	29	(Italy) Gabriele Sabatini	1, 7
(United Kingdom) BVB	Porsche 911 GT2	Porsche 3.6 L Turbo Flat-6	D	30	(United Kingdom) Max Beaverbroock	2, 7
(United Kingdom) BVB	Porsche 911 GT2	Porsche 3.6 L Turbo Flat-6	D	30	(United Kingdom) Geoff Lister	2
(United Kingdom) BVB	Porsche 911 GT2	Porsche 3.6 L Turbo Flat-6	D	30	(United Kingdom) Martin Stretton	7
(France) Sunauto	Porsche 911 GT2	Porsche 3.6 L Turbo Flat-6	P	31	(France) Jean-Pierre Jarier	2, 4
(France) Sunauto	Porsche 911 GT2	Porsche 3.6 L Turbo Flat-6	P	31	(France) François Lafon	2, 4
(France) Sunauto	Porsche 911 GT2	Porsche 3.6 L Turbo Flat-6	P	31	(Belgium) Michel Neugarten	2
(Belgium) GLPK Racing	Chrysler Viper GTS-R	Chrysler 8.0 L V10	D	33	(Belgium) Vincent Vosse	1–7
(Belgium) GLPK Racing	Chrysler Viper GTS-R	Chrysler 8.0 L V10	D	33	(Belgium) Didier Defourny	1–7
(Belgium) GLPK Racing	Chrysler Viper GTS-R	Chrysler 8.0 L V10	D	33	(Belgium) Marc Duez	2
(Belgium) GLPK Racing	Chrysler Viper GTS-R	Chrysler 8.0 L V10	D	33	(Belgium) Anthony Kumpen	4
(Belgium) GLPK Racing	Chrysler Viper GTS-R	Chrysler 8.0 L V10	D	33	(Belgium) Jean-François Hemroulle	4
(Germany) Porsche Zentrum Regensburg	Porsche 911 Turbo	Porsche 3.6 L Turbo Flat-6		35	(Germany) Michael Trunk	6
(Germany) Porsche Zentrum Regensburg	Porsche 911 Turbo	Porsche 3.6 L Turbo Flat-6		35	(Germany) Bernhard Müller	6
(Germany) Porsche Zentrum Regensburg	Porsche 911 Cup	Porsche 3.6 L Flat-6		36	(Germany) Josef Jobst	6
(Germany) Porsche Zentrum Regensburg	Porsche 911 Cup	Porsche 3.6 L Flat-6		36	(Germany) Klaus Gebendorfer	6
(Germany) Porsche Zentrum Regensburg	Porsche 911 Cup	Porsche 3.6 L Flat-6		36	(Germany) Günther Kronseder	6
(United Kingdom) Cirtek Motorsport	Porsche 911 GT2	Porsche 3.6 L Turbo Flat-6		37	(United Kingdom) Robert Schirle	7
(United Kingdom) Cirtek Motorsport	Porsche 911 GT2	Porsche 3.6 L Turbo Flat-6		37	(United Kingdom) Jonathan Baker	7
(United Kingdom) Cirtek Motorsport	Porsche 911 GT2	Porsche 3.6 L Turbo Flat-6		37	(Australia) Charlie Cox	7
(Germany) Proton Competition	Porsche 911 GT2	Porsche 3.6 L Turbo Flat-6	Y	69	(Germany) Gerold Ried	1–7, 10
(Germany) Proton Competition	Porsche 911 GT2	Porsche 3.6 L Turbo Flat-6	Y	69	(Germany) Christian Ried	1–7, 10
(Germany) Proton Competition	Porsche 911 GT2	Porsche 3.6 L Turbo Flat-6	Y	69	(France) Patrick Vuillaume	1–4
(Germany) Seikel Motorsport	Porsche 911 GT2	Porsche 3.6 L Turbo Flat-6	D	77	(United Kingdom) Richard Nearn	1–7
(Germany) Seikel Motorsport	Porsche 911 GT2	Porsche 3.6 L Turbo Flat-6	D	77	(Germany) Ernst Palmberger	1–6
(Germany) Seikel Motorsport	Porsche 911 GT2	Porsche 3.6 L Turbo Flat-6	D	77	(United Kingdom) Nigel Smith	1–6
(Germany) Seikel Motorsport	Porsche 911 GT2	Porsche 3.6 L Turbo Flat-6	D	77	(New Zealand) Rob Wilson	7
(Germany) Seikel Motorsport	Porsche 911 GT2	Porsche 3.6 L Turbo Flat-6	D	78	(Italy) Renato Mastropietro	1–2
(Germany) Seikel Motorsport	Porsche 911 GT2	Porsche 3.6 L Turbo Flat-6	D	78	(Italy) Claudio Padovani	1–2
(Germany) Seikel Motorsport	Porsche 911 GT2	Porsche 3.6 L Turbo Flat-6	D	78	(Italy) Raffaele Sangiuolo	1, 4
(Germany) Seikel Motorsport	Porsche 911 GT2	Porsche 3.6 L Turbo Flat-6	D	78	(Italy) Paolo Zanichelli	2
(Germany) Seikel Motorsport	Porsche 911 GT2	Porsche 3.6 L Turbo Flat-6	D	78	(France) Jacques Schwach	3
(Germany) Seikel Motorsport	Porsche 911 GT2	Porsche 3.6 L Turbo Flat-6	D	78	(France) Bernard Schwach	3
(Germany) Seikel Motorsport	Porsche 911 GT2	Porsche 3.6 L Turbo Flat-6	D	78	(France) Didier van Straaten	3
(Germany) Seikel Motorsport	Porsche 911 GT2	Porsche 3.6 L Turbo Flat-6	D	78	(France) Xavier Pompidou	4, 7
(Germany) Seikel Motorsport	Porsche 911 GT2	Porsche 3.6 L Turbo Flat-6	D	78	(Morocco) Max Cohen-Olivar	4, 7
(Germany) Seikel Motorsport	Porsche 911 GT2	Porsche 3.6 L Turbo Flat-6	D	78	(Italy) Ruggero Grassi	6
(Germany) Seikel Motorsport	Porsche 911 GT2	Porsche 3.6 L Turbo Flat-6	D	78	(Germany) Christian Vogler	6
(Germany) Seikel Motorsport	Porsche 911 GT2	Porsche 3.6 L Turbo Flat-6	D	78	(Italy) Paolo Rapetti	7

== Results and standings ==
=== Race results ===
Rnd	Circuit	Overall Winning Team	Report
Rnd	Circuit	Overall Winning Drivers	Report
1	Monza	(France) No. 1 Chrysler Viper Team Oreca	Report
1	Monza	(Monaco) Olivier Beretta (Austria) Karl Wendlinger	Report
2	Silverstone	(France) No. 1 Chrysler Viper Team Oreca	Report
2	Silverstone	(Monaco) Olivier Beretta (Austria) Karl Wendlinger	Report
3	Hockenheimring	(France) No. 2 Chrysler Viper Team Oreca	Report
3	Hockenheimring	(France) Jean-Philippe Belloc (France) Dominique Dupuy	Report
4	Hungaroring	(France) No. 2 Chrysler Viper Team Oreca	Report
4	Hungaroring	(France) Jean-Philippe Belloc (France) Dominique Dupuy	Report
5	Zolder	(France) No. 1 Chrysler Viper Team Oreca	Report
5	Zolder	(Monaco) Olivier Beretta (Austria) Karl Wendlinger	Report
6	Oschersleben	(France) No. 1 Chrysler Viper Team Oreca	Report
6	Oschersleben	(Monaco) Olivier Beretta (Austria) Karl Wendlinger	Report
7	Donington	(France) No. 1 Chrysler Viper Team Oreca	Report
7	Donington	(Monaco) Olivier Beretta (Austria) Karl Wendlinger	Report
8	Homestead	(France) No. 21 Paul Belmondo Racing	Report
8	Homestead	(France) Paul Belmondo (France) Emmanuel Clérico	Report
9	Watkins Glen	(France) No. 2 Chrysler Viper Team Oreca	Report
9	Watkins Glen	(France) Jean-Philippe Belloc (United States) David Donohue	Report
10	Zhuhai	(France) No. 1 Chrysler Viper Team Oreca	Report
10	Zhuhai	(Monaco) Olivier Beretta (Austria) Karl Wendlinger	Report

Points were awarded to the top six finishers in each race. Entries were required to complete 75% of the race distance in order to be classified as a finisher. Drivers were required to complete 20% of the total race distance for their car to earn points. Teams scored points for each of its cars which finished a race in a top six placing.

Points system
1st	2nd	3rd	4th	5th	6th
10	6	4	3	2	1

=== Drivers championship ===
Pos.	Driver	Car	Team	MON (Italy)	SIL (United Kingdom)	HOC (Germany)	HUN (Hungary)	ZOL (Belgium)	OSC (Germany)	DON (United Kingdom)	HOM (United States)	WAT (United States)	ZHU (China)	Total points
1	(Monaco) Olivier Beretta	Chrysler Viper GTS-R	(France) Chrysler Viper Team Oreca	1	1		2	1	1	1	2	2	1	78
1	(Austria) Karl Wendlinger	Chrysler Viper GTS-R	(France) Chrysler Viper Team Oreca	1	1		2	1	1	1	2	2	1	78
2	(France) Jean-Philippe Belloc	Chrysler Viper GTS-R	(France) Chrysler Viper Team Oreca	2	2	1	1	Ret	2	16	4	1	5	53
3	(United States) David Donohue	Chrysler Viper GTS-R	(France) Chrysler Viper Team Oreca	2	2						4	1		25
4	(France) Dominique Dupuy	Chrysler Viper GTS-R	(France) Chrysler Viper Team Oreca			1	1							24
4	(France) Dominique Dupuy	Chrysler Viper GTS-R	(France) Paul Belmondo Racing										3	24
5	(Germany) Christian Gläsel	Chrysler Viper GTS-R	(United Kingdom) Chamberlain Motorsport	4	4	12	8	Ret	4	5	7	3	2	21
5	(United Kingdom) Christian Vann	Chrysler Viper GTS-R	(United Kingdom) Chamberlain Motorsport	4	4	12	8	Ret	4	5	7	3	2	21
6	(Germany) Wolfgang Kaufmann	Porsche 911 GT2	(Germany) Freisinger Motorsport	3	6	5	6	4	5	Ret	5	4	4	21
7	(France) Paul Belmondo	Chrysler Viper GTS-R	(France) Paul Belmondo Racing	6	7	7	10	5		7	1	5	3	19
8	(France) Bob Wollek	Porsche 911 GT2	(Germany) Konrad Motorsport	15		3	3		8					16
8	(France) Bob Wollek	Porsche 911 GT2	(Germany) Freisinger Motorsport								5	4	4	16
9	(Belgium) Vincent Vosse	Chrysler Viper GTS-R	(Belgium) GLPK Racing	5	3	Ret	13	14	Ret	4				16
9	(Belgium) Vincent Vosse	Chrysler Viper GTS-R	(United Kingdom) Chamberlain Motorsport								3	6		16
9	(Belgium) Vincent Vosse	Chrysler Viper GTS-R	(France) Chrysler Viper Team Oreca										5	16
10	(Portugal) Ni Amorim	Chrysler Viper GTS-R	(United Kingdom) Chamberlain Motorsport	Ret	Ret	Ret	4	2	3	6			10	14
11	(Switzerland) Toni Seiler	Chrysler Viper GTS-R	(United Kingdom) Chamberlain Motorsport		Ret	Ret	4	2	3	6				14
12	(France) Michel Ligonnet	Porsche 911 GT2	(Germany) Freisinger Motorsport	3	6	5	6	4	5	Ret				14
12	(France) Michel Ligonnet	Chrysler Viper GTS-R	(United Kingdom) Chamberlain Motorsport									6	10	14
13	(Austria) Franz Konrad	Porsche 911 GT2	(Germany) Konrad Motorsport	15	13	3	3	6	8	3	Ret	11	Ret	13
14	(United Kingdom) Justin Bell	Chrysler Viper GTS-R	(France) Chrysler Viper Team Oreca		2	2				16				12
15	(France) Emmanuel Clérico	Chrysler Viper GTS-R	(France) Paul Belmondo Racing	Ret		Ret	10		6		1			11
16	(Belgium) Marc Duez	Chrysler Viper GTS-R	(Belgium) GLPK Racing		3									10
16	(Belgium) Marc Duez	Chrysler Viper GTS-R	(France) Chrysler Viper Team Oreca					Ret	2					10
17	(United Kingdom) Julian Bailey	Lister Storm GT2	(United Kingdom) Lister Storm Racing	Ret	Ret	4		12		2				9
18	(Belgium) Didier Defourny	Chrysler Viper GTS-R	(Belgium) GLPK Racing	5	3	Ret	13	14	Ret	4				9
19	(Italy) Luca Drudi	Chrysler Viper GTS-R	(France) Chrysler Viper Team Oreca			2								8
19	(Italy) Luca Drudi	Chrysler Viper GTS-R	(France) Paul Belmondo Racing									5		8
20	(Netherlands) Hans Hugenholtz Jr.	Chrysler Viper GTS-R	(United Kingdom) Chamberlain Motorsport		4						3		10	7
21	(Germany) Sascha Maassen	Porsche 911 GT2	(Germany) Roock Sportsystem			9	5		14					6
21	(Germany) Sascha Maassen	Porsche 911 GT2	(Germany) Konrad Motorsport							3			Ret	6
22	(France) Xavier Pompidou	Porsche 911 GT2	(Germany) Seikel Motorsport				NC			12				5
22	(France) Xavier Pompidou	Chrysler Viper GTS-R	(United Kingdom) Chamberlain Motorsport								3	6		5
23	(Netherlands) Mike Hezemans	Marcos LM600	(Netherlands) Marcos Racing International	13					DNS					4
23	(Netherlands) Mike Hezemans	Porsche 911 GT2	(Germany) Konrad Motorsport		13						Ret	11		4
23	(Netherlands) Mike Hezemans	Lister Storm GT2	(United Kingdom) Lister Storm Racing			Ret		3						4
23	(Netherlands) Mike Hezemans	Chrysler Viper GTS-R	(France) Paul Belmondo Racing				9			Ret				4
24	(Netherlands) David Hart	Lister Storm GT2	(United Kingdom) Lister Storm Racing			Ret		3						4
25	(France) Claude-Yves Gosselin	Chrysler Viper GTS-R	(France) Paul Belmondo Racing	6	7	7	10	5	6	7				4
26	(United Kingdom) Jamie Campbell-Walter	Lister Storm GT2	(United Kingdom) Lister Storm Racing			4		12						3
27	(United Kingdom) Tim Sugden	Lister Storm GT2	(United Kingdom) Lister Storm Racing			4								3
28	(Monaco) Stéphane Ortelli	Porsche 911 GT2	(Germany) Roock Racing	8	5	15	16							2
28	(Monaco) Stéphane Ortelli	Porsche 911 GT2	(Germany) Roock Sportsystem						14					2
29	(Germany) Claudia Hürtgen	Porsche 911 GT2	(Germany) Roock Racing	8	5	15	16	15						2
30	(Germany) Paul Hulverscheid	Porsche 911 GT2	(Germany) Roock Sportsystem		Ret	9	5		14					2
31	(Germany) Michael Eschmann	Porsche 911 GT2	(Germany) Roock Sportsystem	21	Ret	9	5							2
32	(Austria) Manfred Jurasz	Porsche 911 GT2	(Germany) Freisinger Motorsport	19	Ret	14	17	7	10	9	6	8	6	2
33	(Japan) Yukihiro Hane	Porsche 911 GT2	(Germany) Freisinger Motorsport			14	17	7	10	9		9	6	1
34	(Germany) André Ahrlé	Porsche 911 GT2	(Germany) Roock Racing	11	Ret	6	7	15						1
34	(Germany) Hubert Haupt	Porsche 911 GT2	(Germany) Roock Racing	11	Ret	6	7	15						1
35	(Germany) Altfrid Heger	Porsche 911 GT2	(Germany) Konrad Motorsport					6						1
35	(United States) Lance Stewart	Porsche 911 GT2	(Germany) Freisinger Motorsport								6			1
Pos.	Driver	Car	Team	MON (Italy)	SIL (United Kingdom)	HOC (Germany)	HUN (Hungary)	ZOL (Belgium)	OSC (Germany)	DON (United Kingdom)	HOM (United States)	WAT (United States)	ZHU (China)	Total points

Colour	Result
Gold	Winner
Silver	Second place
Bronze	Third place
Green	Points classification
Blue	Non-points classification
Blue	Non-classified finish (NC)
Purple	Retired, not classified (Ret)
Red	Did not qualify (DNQ)
Red	Did not pre-qualify (DNPQ)
Black	Disqualified (DSQ)
White	Did not start (DNS)
White	Withdrew (WD)
White	Race cancelled (C)
Blank	Did not practice (DNP)
Blank	Did not arrive (DNA)
Blank	Excluded (EX)

=== Teams championship ===
Pos.	Team	Car	MON (Italy)	SIL (United Kingdom)	HOC (Germany)	HUN (Hungary)	ZOL (Belgium)	OSC (Germany)	DON (United Kingdom)	HOM (United States)	WAT (United States)	ZHU (China)	Total points
1	(France) Chrysler Viper Team Oreca	Chrysler Viper GTS-R	1	1	1	1	1	1	1	2	1	1	137
1	(France) Chrysler Viper Team Oreca	Chrysler Viper GTS-R	2	2	2	2	Ret	2	16	4	2	5	137
2	(United Kingdom) Chamberlain Motorsport	Chrysler Viper GTS-R	4	4	12	4	2	3	5	3	3	2	40
2	(United Kingdom) Chamberlain Motorsport	Chrysler Viper GTS-R	Ret	Ret	Ret	8	Ret	4	6	7	6	10	40
3	(Germany) Freisinger Motorsport	Porsche 911 GT2	3	6	5	6	4	5	9	5	4	4	23
3	(Germany) Freisinger Motorsport	Porsche 911 GT2	19	Ret	14	17	7	10	Ret	6	8	6	23
4	(France) Paul Belmondo Racing	Chrysler Viper GTS-R	6	7	7	9	5	6	7	1	5	3	20
4	(France) Paul Belmondo Racing	Chrysler Viper GTS-R	Ret		Ret	10	Ret	Ret	Ret	Ret	7		20
5	(United Kingdom) Lister Storm Racing	Lister Storm GT2	Ret	Ret	4		3		2				13
5	(United Kingdom) Lister Storm Racing	Lister Storm GT2			Ret		12						13
6	(Germany) Konrad Motorsport	Porsche 911 GT2	15	13	3	3	6	8	3	9	11	NC	13
6	(Germany) Konrad Motorsport	Porsche 911 GT2								Ret	12	Ret	13
7	(Belgium) GLPK Racing	Chrysler Viper GTS-R	5	3	Ret	13	14	Ret	4				9
8	(Germany) Roock Racing	Porsche 911 GT2	8	5	6	7	15					9	3
8	(Germany) Roock Racing	Porsche 911 GT2	11	Ret	15	16							3
9	(Germany) Roock Sportsystem	Porsche 911 GT2	21	Ret	9	5	10	14					2
9	(Germany) Roock Sportsystem	Porsche 911 GT2		Ret									2
-	(Switzerland) Haberthur Racing	Porsche 911 GT2	7	Ret	8	12	9	7	14	8	9	7	0
-	(Switzerland) Haberthur Racing	Porsche 911 GT2	14	Ret	11	20	Ret	13	Ret	Ret	10	Ret	0
-	(United Kingdom) BVB	Porsche 911 GT2		8					8				0
-	(Germany) Proton Competition	Porsche 911 GT2	Ret	10	NC	Ret	8	Ret	10			8	0
-	(Germany) Seikel Motorsport	Porsche 911 GT2	10	9	13	11	11	9	12				0
-	(Germany) Seikel Motorsport	Porsche 911 GT2	17	Ret	16	NC		12	Ret				0
-	(Italy) Autorlando	Porsche 911 GT2	9						11				0
-	(Netherlands) Marcos Racing International	Marcos LM600	13		10	14	Ret	DNS					0
-	(Netherlands) Marcos Racing International	Marcos LM600					Ret						0
-	(Germany) RWS	Porsche 911 GT2	12	11	Ret	15	Ret	11	Ret				0
-	(France) Werner	Porsche 911 GT2		Ret	NC	19	13		15				0
-	(France) Sunauto	Porsche 911 GT2		12		18							0
-	(United Kingdom) Cirtek Motorsport	Porsche 911 GT2							13				0
-	(Italy) Ruggero Grassi	Porsche 911 GT2	16										0
-	(Italy) MAC Racing	Porsche 911	18										0
-	(Hungary) Bovi Motorsport	Porsche 911 GT2	20			DNS							0
-	(Italy) Ebimotors	Porsche 911 GT2	Ret										0
-	(Germany) Porsche Zentrum Regensburg	Porsche 911 GT2						Ret					0
-	(Germany) Porsche Zentrum Regensburg	Porsche 911 GT2						Ret					0

== Bibliography ==
- SRO Motorsports Group (1999). Official FIA GT Championship Media Guide and Review 1999. Paris: Stéphane Ratel Organisation. pp. 1–80.
