= 1999 FIA GT Zolder 500km =

Layout of the Circuit Zolder (1986-2001)

The 1999 FIA GT Zolder 500 km was the fifth round the 1999 FIA GT Championship season. It took place at the Circuit Zolder, Belgium, on July 18, 1999.

== Official results ==
Cars failing to complete 70% of winner's distance are marked as Not Classified (NC).

Pos	No	Team	Drivers	Chassis	Tyre	Laps
Pos	No	Team	Drivers	Engine	Tyre	Laps
1	1	(France) Chrysler Viper Team Oreca	(Monaco) Olivier Beretta (Austria) Karl Wendlinger	Chrysler Viper GTS-R	M	106
1	1	(France) Chrysler Viper Team Oreca	(Monaco) Olivier Beretta (Austria) Karl Wendlinger	Chrysler 8.0L V10	M	106
2	18	(United Kingdom) Chamberlain Motorsport	(Portugal) Ni Amorim (Switzerland) Toni Seiler	Chrysler Viper GTS-R	M	106
2	18	(United Kingdom) Chamberlain Motorsport	(Portugal) Ni Amorim (Switzerland) Toni Seiler	Chrysler 8.0L V10	M	106
3	34	(United Kingdom) Lister Storm Racing	(Netherlands) Mike Hezemans (Netherlands) David Hart	Lister Storm	M	105
3	34	(United Kingdom) Lister Storm Racing	(Netherlands) Mike Hezemans (Netherlands) David Hart	Jaguar 7.0L V12	M	105
4	15	(Germany) Freisinger Motorsport	(France) Michel Ligonnet (Germany) Wolfgang Kaufmann	Porsche 911 GT2	D	105
4	15	(Germany) Freisinger Motorsport	(France) Michel Ligonnet (Germany) Wolfgang Kaufmann	Porsche 3.6L Turbo Flat-6	D	105
5	21	(France) Paul Belmondo Racing	(France) Paul Belmondo (France) Claude Yves-Gosselin	Chrysler Viper GTS-R	D	104
5	21	(France) Paul Belmondo Racing	(France) Paul Belmondo (France) Claude Yves-Gosselin	Chrysler 8.0L V10	D	104
6	6	(Germany) Konrad Motorsport	(Austria) Franz Konrad (Germany) Altfrid Heger	Porsche 911 GT2	D	101
6	6	(Germany) Konrad Motorsport	(Austria) Franz Konrad (Germany) Altfrid Heger	Porsche 3.6L Turbo Flat-6	D	101
7	16	(Germany) Freisinger Motorsport	(Austria) Manfred Jurasz (Japan) Yukihiro Hane	Porsche 911 GT2	D	100
7	16	(Germany) Freisinger Motorsport	(Austria) Manfred Jurasz (Japan) Yukihiro Hane	Porsche 3.6L Turbo Flat-6	D	100
8	69	(Germany) Proton Competition	(Germany) Gerold Ried (Germany) Christian Ried	Porsche 911 GT2	Y	99
8	69	(Germany) Proton Competition	(Germany) Gerold Ried (Germany) Christian Ried	Porsche 3.6L Turbo Flat-6	Y	99
9	9	(Switzerland) Elf Haberthur Racing	(Italy) Raffaele Sangiuolo (Italy) Mauro Casadei (France) Patrick Vuillaume	Porsche 911 GT2	D	97
9	9	(Switzerland) Elf Haberthur Racing	(Italy) Raffaele Sangiuolo (Italy) Mauro Casadei (France) Patrick Vuillaume	Porsche 3.6L Turbo Flat-6	D	97
10	5	(Germany) Roock Sportsystem	(Belgium) Ben Lievens (Belgium) Michel Meers	Porsche 911	Y	97
10	5	(Germany) Roock Sportsystem	(Belgium) Ben Lievens (Belgium) Michel Meers	Porsche 3.6L Flat-6	Y	97
11	77	(Germany) Seikel Motorsport	(Germany) Ernst Palmberger (United Kingdom) Nigel Smith (United Kingdom) Richard Nearn	Porsche 911 GT2	D	96
11	77	(Germany) Seikel Motorsport	(Germany) Ernst Palmberger (United Kingdom) Nigel Smith (United Kingdom) Richard Nearn	Porsche 3.6L Turbo Flat-6	D	96
12	25	(United Kingdom) Lister Storm Racing	(United Kingdom) Julian Bailey (United Kingdom) Andy Wallace (United Kingdom) Jamie Campbell-Walter	Lister Storm	M	95
12	25	(United Kingdom) Lister Storm Racing	(United Kingdom) Julian Bailey (United Kingdom) Andy Wallace (United Kingdom) Jamie Campbell-Walter	Jaguar 7.0L V12	M	95
13	23	(France) Werner (France) Paul Belmondo Racing	(France) Francis Werner (France) Jacques Piattier (France) Philippe Auvray	Porsche 911 GT2	D	94
13	23	(France) Werner (France) Paul Belmondo Racing	(France) Francis Werner (France) Jacques Piattier (France) Philippe Auvray	Porsche 3.6L Turbo Flat-6	D	94
14	33	(Belgium) GLPK Racing	(Belgium) Vincent Vosse (Belgium) Didier Defourny	Chrysler Viper GTS-R	D	83
14	33	(Belgium) GLPK Racing	(Belgium) Vincent Vosse (Belgium) Didier Defourny	Chrysler 8.0L V10	D	83
15	4	(Germany) Roock Racing	(Germany) André Ahrlé (Germany) Hubert Haupt (Germany) Claudia Hürtgen	Porsche 911 GT2	Y	79
15	4	(Germany) Roock Racing	(Germany) André Ahrlé (Germany) Hubert Haupt (Germany) Claudia Hürtgen	Porsche 3.6L Turbo Flat-6	Y	79
16 DNF	19	(United Kingdom) Chamberlain Motorsport	(United Kingdom) Christian Vann (Germany) Christian Gläsel	Chrysler Viper GTS-R	M	46
16 DNF	19	(United Kingdom) Chamberlain Motorsport	(United Kingdom) Christian Vann (Germany) Christian Gläsel	Chrysler 8.0L V10	M	46
17 DNF	22	(France) Paul Belmondo Racing	(United Kingdom) Alex Portman (Germany) Steffan Widmann	Chrysler Viper GTS-R	D	45
17 DNF	22	(France) Paul Belmondo Racing	(United Kingdom) Alex Portman (Germany) Steffan Widmann	Chrysler 8.0L V10	D	45
18 DNF	11	(Netherlands) Marcos Racing International	(Netherlands) Cor Euser (Netherlands) Herman Buurman	Marcos Mantara LM600	D	41
18 DNF	11	(Netherlands) Marcos Racing International	(Netherlands) Cor Euser (Netherlands) Herman Buurman	Chevrolet 5.9L V8	D	41
19 DNF	2	(France) Chrysler Viper Team Oreca	(France) Jean-Philippe Belloc (Belgium) Marc Duez	Chrysler Viper GTS-R	M	29
19 DNF	2	(France) Chrysler Viper Team Oreca	(France) Jean-Philippe Belloc (Belgium) Marc Duez	Chrysler 8.0L V10	M	29
20 DNF	10	(Netherlands) Marcos Racing International	(Belgium) Hans Willems (Belgium) Vincent Dupont	Marcos Mantara LM600	D	18
20 DNF	10	(Netherlands) Marcos Racing International	(Belgium) Hans Willems (Belgium) Vincent Dupont	Chevrolet 5.9L V8	D	18
21 DNF	24	(Germany) RWS Motorsport	(Austria) Horst Felbermayr, Sr. (Austria) Horst Felbermayr, Jr.	Porsche 911 GT2	?	8
21 DNF	24	(Germany) RWS Motorsport	(Austria) Horst Felbermayr, Sr. (Austria) Horst Felbermayr, Jr.	Porsche 3.6L Turbo Flat-6	?	8
22 DNF	8	(Switzerland) Elf Haberthur Racing	(Italy) Luca Cappellari (Italy) Marco Spinelli (Belgium) Michel Neugarten	Porsche 911 GT2	D	4
22 DNF	8	(Switzerland) Elf Haberthur Racing	(Italy) Luca Cappellari (Italy) Marco Spinelli (Belgium) Michel Neugarten	Porsche 3.6L Turbo Flat-6	D	4

== Statistics ==
- Pole position – #25 Julian Bailey – 1:34.314
- Fastest lap – #25 Julian Bailey – 1:35.636
- Average speed – 147.598 km/h

FIA GT Championship
Previous race: 1999 FIA GT Budapest 500km	1999 season	Next race: 1999 FIA GT Oschersleben 500km
