= 1999 FIA GT Watkins Glen 3 Hours =

Motor race held in New York City, USA

Track Map of Watkins Glen International.

The Bosch Sports Car Oktoberfest was the ninth round of the 1999 FIA GT Championship season. It took place at Watkins Glen International, New York, United States, on October 3, 1999.

As with the previous FIA GT event, this race was originally intended to share the weekend with a United States Road Racing Championship event. However, the USRRC championship was cancelled midway through the season, leaving the FIA GT Championship to run on their own. In order to increase the number of participants for the FIA GT event, as well as to allow USRRC teams to compete, a National GT (N-GT) designation was used for cars which had run in the USRRC's GT2 and GT3 classes. Cars running in the N-GT class would not be eligible for points in the FIA GT Championship.

This race would also be the last time that the FIA GT Championship would run in North America.

== Official results ==
Class winners are in bold. Cars failing to complete 70% of winner's distance are marked as Not Classified (NC).

Pos	Class	No	Team	Drivers	Chassis	Tyre	Laps
Pos	Class	No	Team	Drivers	Engine	Tyre	Laps
1	**GT**	**2**	**(France) Viper Team Oreca**	**(France) Jean-Philippe Belloc (United States) David Donohue**	**Chrysler Viper GTS-R**	**MI**	**93**
1	**GT**	**2**	**(France) Viper Team Oreca**	**(France) Jean-Philippe Belloc (United States) David Donohue**	**Chrysler 8.0L V10**	**MI**	**93**
2	GT	1	(France) Viper Team Oreca	(Monaco) Olivier Beretta (Austria) Karl Wendlinger	Chrysler Viper GTS-R	**MI**	93
2	GT	1	(France) Viper Team Oreca	(Monaco) Olivier Beretta (Austria) Karl Wendlinger	Chrysler 8.0L V10	**MI**	93
3	GT	19	(United Kingdom) Chamberlain Motorsport	(United Kingdom) Christian Vann (Germany) Christian Gläsel	Chrysler Viper GTS-R	**MI**	92
3	GT	19	(United Kingdom) Chamberlain Motorsport	(United Kingdom) Christian Vann (Germany) Christian Gläsel	Chrysler 8.0L V10	**MI**	92
4	GT	15	(Germany) Freisinger Motorsport	(France) Bob Wollek (Germany) Wolfgang Kaufmann	Porsche 911 GT2	**D**	91
4	GT	15	(Germany) Freisinger Motorsport	(France) Bob Wollek (Germany) Wolfgang Kaufmann	Porsche 3.6L Turbo Flat-6	**D**	91
5	GT	21	(France) Paul Belmondo Racing	(France) Paul Belmondo (Italy) Luca Drudi	Chrysler Viper GTS-R	**D**	91
5	GT	21	(France) Paul Belmondo Racing	(France) Paul Belmondo (Italy) Luca Drudi	Chrysler 8.0L V10	**D**	91
6	GT	18	(United Kingdom) Chamberlain Motorsport	(France) Xavier Pompidou (France) Michel Ligonnet (Belgium) Vincent Vosse	Chrysler Viper GTS-R	**MI**	91
6	GT	18	(United Kingdom) Chamberlain Motorsport	(France) Xavier Pompidou (France) Michel Ligonnet (Belgium) Vincent Vosse	Chrysler 8.0L V10	**MI**	91
7	**N-GT**	**17**	**(United States) Schumacher Racing**	**(United States) Larry Schumacher (United States) John O'Steen**	**Porsche 911 GT2**	**MI**	**90**
7	**N-GT**	**17**	**(United States) Schumacher Racing**	**(United States) Larry Schumacher (United States) John O'Steen**	**Porsche 3.6L Turbo Flat-6**	**MI**	**90**
8	GT	22	(France) Paul Belmondo Racing	(United States) Steve Pfeffer (Canada) "Rael"	Chrysler Viper GTS-R	**D**	90
8	GT	22	(France) Paul Belmondo Racing	(United States) Steve Pfeffer (Canada) "Rael"	Chrysler 8.0L V10	**D**	90
9	GT	16	(Germany) Freisinger Motorsport	(Austria) Manfred Jurasz (Japan) Yukihiro Hane	Porsche 911 GT2	**D**	86
9	GT	16	(Germany) Freisinger Motorsport	(Austria) Manfred Jurasz (Japan) Yukihiro Hane	Porsche 3.6L Turbo Flat-6	**D**	86
10	N-GT	46	(United States) Reiser Callas Rennsport	(United States) Joel Reiser (United States) David Murry	Porsche 911 Carrera RSR	?	86
10	N-GT	46	(United States) Reiser Callas Rennsport	(United States) Joel Reiser (United States) David Murry	Porsche 3.8L Flat-6	?	86
11	GT	9	(Switzerland) Elf Haberthur Racing	(Italy) Mauro Casadei (Italy) Andrea Garbagnati	Porsche 911 GT2	**D**	85
11	GT	9	(Switzerland) Elf Haberthur Racing	(Italy) Mauro Casadei (Italy) Andrea Garbagnati	Porsche 3.6L Turbo Flat-6	**D**	85
12	GT	8	(Switzerland) Elf Haberthur Racing	(Italy) Luca Cappellari (France) Patrick Vuillaume (United States) David Kicak	Porsche 911 GT2	**D**	83
12	GT	8	(Switzerland) Elf Haberthur Racing	(Italy) Luca Cappellari (France) Patrick Vuillaume (United States) David Kicak	Porsche 3.6L Turbo Flat-6	**D**	83
13	N-GT	84	(United States) Jeff Nowicki (United States) Specter Werks	(United States) Jeff Nowicki (United States) Andy Pilgrim	Chevrolet Corvette C5	?	83
13	N-GT	84	(United States) Jeff Nowicki (United States) Specter Werks	(United States) Jeff Nowicki (United States) Andy Pilgrim	Chevrolet 5.7L V8	?	83
14	N-GT	44	(United States) John Fergus (United States) Dick Greer Racing	(United States) John Fergus (United States) Dick Greer	Oldsmobile Cutlass Supreme	?	83
14	N-GT	44	(United States) John Fergus (United States) Dick Greer Racing	(United States) John Fergus (United States) Dick Greer	Oldsmobile V8	?	83
15	GT	6	(Germany) Konrad Motorsport	(Austria) Franz Konrad (Netherlands) Mike Hezemans	Porsche 911 GT2	**D**	78
15	GT	6	(Germany) Konrad Motorsport	(Austria) Franz Konrad (Netherlands) Mike Hezemans	Porsche 3.6L Turbo Flat-6	**D**	78
16	N-GT	52	(United States) Glenn Seward (United States) Extreme Motor Racing	(United States) Glenn Seward (United States) David Galpin (United States) James Yeames	Chevrolet Corvette C4	?	72
16	N-GT	52	(United States) Glenn Seward (United States) Extreme Motor Racing	(United States) Glenn Seward (United States) David Galpin (United States) James Yeames	Chevrolet V8	?	72
17	N-GT	53	(United States) Michael Jacobs (United States) Jacobs Motorsports	(United States) Richard Geck (United States) Frank Del Vecchio	Ford Mustang Cobra R	?	62
17	N-GT	53	(United States) Michael Jacobs (United States) Jacobs Motorsports	(United States) Richard Geck (United States) Frank Del Vecchio	Ford 5.8L V8	?	62
18	GT	7	(Germany) Konrad Motorsport	(United States) Charles Slater (Spain) Jesús Diez de Villarroel	Porsche 911 GT2	**D**	48
18	GT	7	(Germany) Konrad Motorsport	(United States) Charles Slater (Spain) Jesús Diez de Villarroel	Porsche 3.6L Turbo Flat-6	**D**	48
19	N-GT	54	(United States) Michael Jacobs (United States) Jacobs Motorsports	(United States) Michael Jacobs (United States) Paul Hacker	Ford Mustang Cobra R	?	20
19	N-GT	54	(United States) Michael Jacobs (United States) Jacobs Motorsports	(United States) Michael Jacobs (United States) Paul Hacker	Ford 5.8L V8	?	20
20 DNF	N-GT	47	(United States) Paragon Motorsports	(United States) Keith Fisher (United States) Scott Brunk	Porsche 964 Carrera Cup	**P**	8
20 DNF	N-GT	47	(United States) Paragon Motorsports	(United States) Keith Fisher (United States) Scott Brunk	Porsche 3.6L Flat-6	**P**	8
21 DNF	N-GT	45	(United States) SSZ Motorcars	(United States) Mark Knepper (United States) William Collins	SSZ Stradale Mk.III	?	4
21 DNF	N-GT	45	(United States) SSZ Motorcars	(United States) Mark Knepper (United States) William Collins	Nissan 3.0L Turbo V6	?	4

== Statistics ==
- Pole position – #2 Viper Team Oreca – 1:47.576
- Fastest lap – #2 Viper Team Oreca – 1:47.717
- Average speed – 171.297 km/h

FIA GT Championship
Previous race: 1999 FIA GT Homestead 3 Hours	1999 season	Next race: 1999 FIA GT Zhuhai 500km
