= 1999 FIA GT Homestead 3 Hours =

Layout of the Homestead-Miami Speedway road course

The 1999 FIA GT Homestead 3 Hours was the eighth round the 1999 FIA GT Championship season. It took place at the Homestead-Miami Speedway, Florida, United States, on September 26, 1999.

This event was originally intended to share the weekend with a United States Road Racing Championship event. However, the USRRC championship was cancelled midway through the season, leaving the FIA GT Championship to run on their own. In order to increase the number of participants for the FIA GT event, as well as to allow USRRC teams to compete, a National GT (N-GT) designation was used for cars which had run in the USRRC's GT2 and GT3 classes. This would be the first time the FIA GT Championship used two classes of cars since the end of the 1998 season, and the cancellation of GT1.

Cars running in the N-GT class would not be eligible for points in the FIA GT Championship.

== Official results ==
Class winners are in bold. Cars failing to complete 70% of winner's distance are marked as Not Classified (NC).

Pos	Class	No	Team	Drivers	Chassis	Tyre	Laps
Pos	Class	No	Team	Drivers	Engine	Tyre	Laps
1	**GT**	**21**	**(France) Paul Belmondo Racing**	**(France) Paul Belmondo (France) Emmanuel Clérico**	**Chrysler Viper GTS-R**	**D**	**122**
1	**GT**	**21**	**(France) Paul Belmondo Racing**	**(France) Paul Belmondo (France) Emmanuel Clérico**	**Chrysler 8.0L V10**	**D**	**122**
2	GT	1	(France) Viper Team Oreca	(Monaco) Olivier Beretta (Austria) Karl Wendlinger	Chrysler Viper GTS-R	**MI**	122
2	GT	1	(France) Viper Team Oreca	(Monaco) Olivier Beretta (Austria) Karl Wendlinger	Chrysler 8.0L V10	**MI**	122
3	GT	18	(United Kingdom) Chamberlain Motorsport	(France) Xavier Pompidou (Netherlands) Hans Hugenholtz (Belgium) Vincent Vosse	Chrysler Viper GTS-R	**MI**	121
3	GT	18	(United Kingdom) Chamberlain Motorsport	(France) Xavier Pompidou (Netherlands) Hans Hugenholtz (Belgium) Vincent Vosse	Chrysler 8.0L V10	**MI**	121
4	GT	2	(France) Viper Team Oreca	(France) Jean-Philippe Belloc (United States) David Donohue	Chrysler Viper GTS-R	**MI**	120
4	GT	2	(France) Viper Team Oreca	(France) Jean-Philippe Belloc (United States) David Donohue	Chrysler 8.0L V10	**MI**	120
5	GT	15	(Germany) Freisinger Motorsport	(France) Bob Wollek (Germany) Wolfgang Kaufmann	Porsche 911 GT2	**D**	119
5	GT	15	(Germany) Freisinger Motorsport	(France) Bob Wollek (Germany) Wolfgang Kaufmann	Porsche 3.6L Turbo Flat-6	**D**	119
6	GT	16	(Germany) Freisinger Motorsport	(Austria) Manfred Jurasz (United States) Lance Stewart	Porsche 911 GT2	**D**	116
6	GT	16	(Germany) Freisinger Motorsport	(Austria) Manfred Jurasz (United States) Lance Stewart	Porsche 3.6L Turbo Flat-6	**D**	116
7	**N-GT**	**17**	**(United States) Schumacher Racing**	**(United States) Larry Schumacher (United States) Cort Wagner (United States) John O'Steen**	**Porsche 911 GT2**	**MI**	**116**
7	**N-GT**	**17**	**(United States) Schumacher Racing**	**(United States) Larry Schumacher (United States) Cort Wagner (United States) John O'Steen**	**Porsche 3.6L Turbo Flat-6**	**MI**	**116**
8	GT	19	(United Kingdom) Chamberlain Motorsport	(United Kingdom) Christian Vann (Germany) Christian Gläsel	Chrysler Viper GTS-R	**MI**	116
8	GT	19	(United Kingdom) Chamberlain Motorsport	(United Kingdom) Christian Vann (Germany) Christian Gläsel	Chrysler 8.0L V10	**MI**	116
9	GT	8	(Switzerland) Elf Haberthur Racing	(Italy) Luca Cappellari (Italy) Paolo Rapetti (France) Patrick Vuillaume	Porsche 911 GT2	**D**	113
9	GT	8	(Switzerland) Elf Haberthur Racing	(Italy) Luca Cappellari (Italy) Paolo Rapetti (France) Patrick Vuillaume	Porsche 3.6L Turbo Flat-6	**D**	113
10	GT	7	(Germany) Konrad Motorsport	(United States) Charles Slater (United States) Ugo Colombo	Porsche 911 GT2	**D**	113
10	GT	7	(Germany) Konrad Motorsport	(United States) Charles Slater (United States) Ugo Colombo	Porsche 3.6L Turbo Flat-6	**D**	113
11	N-GT	12	(United States) Bell Motorsport	(United States) Ron Johnson (United States) Scott Neuman (United States) Andy Pilgrim	BMW M3	?	112
11	N-GT	12	(United States) Bell Motorsport	(United States) Ron Johnson (United States) Scott Neuman (United States) Andy Pilgrim	BMW 3.2L I6	?	112
12	N-GT	40	(United States) Aspen Knolls Racing	(United States) Shane Lewis (United States) Bob Mazzuoccola	BMW M3	**Y**	102
12	N-GT	40	(United States) Aspen Knolls Racing	(United States) Shane Lewis (United States) Bob Mazzuoccola	BMW 3.2L I6	**Y**	102
13 DNF	GT	6	(Germany) Konrad Motorsport	(Austria) Franz Konrad (Netherlands) Mike Hezemans	Porsche 911 GT2	**D**	67
13 DNF	GT	6	(Germany) Konrad Motorsport	(Austria) Franz Konrad (Netherlands) Mike Hezemans	Porsche 3.6L Turbo Flat-6	**D**	67
14 DNF	GT	9	(Switzerland) Elf Haberthur Racing	(Italy) Mauro Casadei (Italy) Andrea Garbagnati	Porsche 911 GT2	**D**	50
14 DNF	GT	9	(Switzerland) Elf Haberthur Racing	(Italy) Mauro Casadei (Italy) Andrea Garbagnati	Porsche 3.6L Turbo Flat-6	**D**	50
15 DNF	GT	22	(France) Paul Belmondo Racing	(France) Marc Rostan (Canada) "Rael"	Chrysler Viper GTS-R	**D**	49
15 DNF	GT	22	(France) Paul Belmondo Racing	(France) Marc Rostan (Canada) "Rael"	Chrysler 8.0L V10	**D**	49
16 DNF	N-GT	39	(United States) Mosler Automotive	(Portugal) João Barbosa (France) James Ruffier (France) Loïc Depailler	Mosler Intruder	?	24
16 DNF	N-GT	39	(United States) Mosler Automotive	(Portugal) João Barbosa (France) James Ruffier (France) Loïc Depailler	Chevrolet 5.7L V8	?	24
17 DNF	N-GT	14	(United States) NP Racing	(United States) Bret Parker (United States) Kevin Allen	Dodge Viper GTS-R	?	4
17 DNF	N-GT	14	(United States) NP Racing	(United States) Bret Parker (United States) Kevin Allen	Dodge 8.0L V10	?	4

== Statistics ==
- Pole position – #1 Viper Team Oreca – 1:34.442
- Fastest lap – #1 Viper Team Oreca – 1:22.597
- Average speed – 143.426 km/h

FIA GT Championship
Previous race: 1999 FIA GT Donington 500km	1999 season	Next race: 1999 FIA GT Watkins Glen 3 Hours
