= Ni Amorim =

Portuguese racing driver (born 1962)

Fernando Manuel Neiva Machado "Ni" Amorim (born 1 March 1962) is a Portuguese motorsport executive and former racing driver.

== National career ==
Amorim started competing in circuit racing and rallying in 1982, but in the mid-1980s he was almost exclusively a touring car racing driver, becoming a mainstay in various one-make cups and the Portuguese Touring Car Championship.

Amorim was Group N Champion in 1987, and later won the Group A Championship in 1989 and 1990 driving the Poligrupo Ford Sierra RS500, and 1993 with the works Opel Astra (Gr. N).

Amorim returned to the Portuguese Touring Car Championship in 2007 in a semi-works BMW 320si, his first full season in Portugal since 1994.

== International career ==
After a few outings as a Mercedes-AMG driver in the Macau Grand Prix's Guia Race, Amorim began an international career in 1995, first in the International Touring Car Championship and in the following year in the Spanish Touring Car Championship.

In 1997, Amorim lost Opel backing and moved to endurance racing, competing on-and-off in the FIA GT Championship and the American Le Mans Series, as well as the 24 Hours of Le Mans. The high point of his career was at the wheel of the Oreca-run works Chrysler team, with the Chrysler Viper GTS-R and the Chrysler LMP, in 1999 and 2000.

Amorim has also driven in the Spanish and British GT Championship, where he was class champion in 2004. For 2005, he moved to the Le Mans Endurance Series, where he drove a Courage C65.

In 2006, Amorim partnered Manuel Gião to second place in the Spanish GT Championship, in a Ferrari 360 Modena. In 2007, while maintaining a full-time national schedule, he drove a Ferrari 430 in the Spanish GT Championship and the International GT Open.

== 24 Hours of Le Mans results ==
Year	Team	Co-Drivers	Car	Class	Laps	Pos.	Class Pos.
1998	(United Kingdom) Chamberlain Engineering	(Portugal) Gonçalo Gomes (Portugal) Manuel Mello-Breyner	Chrysler Viper GTS-R	GT2	265	21st	7th
1999	(United Kingdom) Chamberlain Engineering	(Netherlands) Hans Hugenholtz (Switzerland) Toni Seiler	Chrysler Viper GTS-R	GTS	314	14th	3rd
2000	(France) Viper Team Oreca	(United States) David Donohue (France) Anthony Beltoise	Chrysler Viper GTS-R	GTS	328	9th	2nd
2001	(France) Viper Team Oreca	(Japan) Seiji Ara (Japan) Masahiko Kondo	Chrysler LMP	LMP900	243	DNF	DNF
2005	(France) Noël del Bello Racing	(France) Romain Iannetta (Switzerland) Christophe Pillon	Courage C65-Mecachrome	LMP2	99	DNF	DNF
