= Freisinger Motorsport =

German car tuner and auto racing team

Freisinger Motorsport is a German company which has tuned, restored, and raced Porsches since 1967. Founded by Manfred Freisinger in Karlsruhe, the company now is run by his son Manfred Freisinger Jr.

== History ==
The company was started in 1967, based in a small workshop in Durlach, before moving to a warehouse in Daxlanden.

From 1992, the company has competed internationally, initially running in the Porsche Supercup, before moving into the BPR Global GT Series and 24 Hours of Le Mans. Freisinger's first international victory came at the 1998 Petit Le Mans, winning in the LMGT2 class with a Porsche 911 GT2. By 1999, they were running in the FIA GT Championship and earned third in the teams championship that year. 2000 saw them earn their first FIA GT win at EuroSpeedway Lausitz on way to a fourth place in the championship.

By 2002, Freisinger would move to the small N-GT class of FIA GT, where they would win the teams championship with seven class victories, including at the Spa 24 Hours. Although managing a mere three class wins, including an overall win at Spa 24 Hours, Freisinger would again take the N-GT championship in 2003.

With this success, Freisinger expanded to a three car team for 2004, allowing them to win a combined total of nine races out of the eleven races scheduled, including sweeping the podium in their class at the Spa 24 Hours. This not only earned Freisinger their third straight N-GT championship, but also earned them second place as well due to the teams being scored separately. During 2004, Freisinger also participated in the Le Mans Series, taking two class wins that season.

However, after the success of 2004 and the following loss of Russian sponsor Yukos, the team decided to withdraw from motorsports in order to concentrate on their tuning and restoration divisions.

Drivers for Freisinger Motorsport included: Romain Dumas, Marc Lieb, and Stéphane Ortelli.
