= 2000 British GT Championship =

Sports car racing season

Seasons
- ← 1999 2001 →

The 2000 Privilege Insurance British GT Championship was the eighth season of the British GT Championship, an auto racing series organised by the British Racing Drivers Club (BRDC) and sponsored by Privilege. Roger Etcell formed the PowerTour series, Alan D. Harrison, former Arrows Team Manager, was hired as GT Manager. The races featured grand touring cars conforming to two categories of regulations known as GT and GTO, and awarded a driver championship in each category. The season began on 25 March 2000 and ended on 8 October 2000 after eleven events, eleven held in Great Britain with one race in Belgium. The series was joined by the BRDC Marcos Mantis Challenge Cup for a few rounds.

== Calendar ==
All races were 60 minutes in duration, although the final round at Silverstone ran for 54 minutes before it was red-flagged due to heavy rain.

Rnd	Circuit	Date
1	Thruxton Circuit, Hampshire	25 March
2	Croft Circuit, North Yorkshire	9 April
3	Oulton Park, Cheshire	1 May
4	Donington Park National Circuit, Leicestershire	7 May
5	Silverstone National Circuit, Northamptonshire	21 May
6	Brands Hatch, Kent	4 June
7	Donington Park Grand Prix Circuit, Leicestershire	7 July
8	Croft Circuit, North Yorkshire	30 July
9	Silverstone National Circuit, Northamptonshire	20 August
10	Snetterton Circuit, Norfolk	3 September
11	Circuit de Spa-Francorchamps, Stavelot, Belgium	24 September
12	Silverstone Grand Prix Circuit, Northamptonshire	8 October

== Teams and drivers ==
=== GT ===
Team	Car	Engine	No.	Drivers	Rounds
(United Kingdom) Cirtek Motorsport	Lister Storm	Jaguar 7.0 L V12	1	(United Kingdom) David Warnock	All
(United Kingdom) Cirtek Motorsport	Lister Storm	Jaguar 7.0 L V12	1	(United Kingdom) Robert Shircle	1–4
(United Kingdom) Cirtek Motorsport	Lister Storm	Jaguar 7.0 L V12	1	(United Kingdom) Jamie Campbell-Walter	5–6, 9, 11
(United Kingdom) Cirtek Motorsport	Lister Storm	Jaguar 7.0 L V12	1	(United Kingdom) Tiff Needell	7
(United Kingdom) Cirtek Motorsport	Lister Storm	Jaguar 7.0 L V12	1	(United Kingdom) Richard Dean	8, 10
(United Kingdom) Cirtek Motorsport	Lister Storm	Jaguar 7.0 L V12	1	(United Kingdom) Julian Bailey	12
(United Kingdom) Cirtek Motorsport	Porsche 911 GT2	Porsche 3.6 L Turbo Flat-6	10	(Australia) Charlie Cox	7, 10–12
(United Kingdom) Cirtek Motorsport	Porsche 911 GT2	Porsche 3.6 L Turbo Flat-6	10	(United Kingdom) Jonathan Baker	7, 10–11
(United Kingdom) Cirtek Motorsport	Porsche 911 GT2	Porsche 3.6 L Turbo Flat-6	10	(United Kingdom) Robert Shircle	12
(United Kingdom) Bob Watson Motorsport	Porsche 911 GT2	Porsche 3.6 L Turbo Flat-6	3	(United Kingdom) Mike Youles	3–10, 12
(United Kingdom) Bob Watson Motorsport	Porsche 911 GT2	Porsche 3.6 L Turbo Flat-6	3	(United Kingdom) Tim Harvey	3–8
(United Kingdom) Bob Watson Motorsport	Porsche 911 GT2	Porsche 3.6 L Turbo Flat-6	3	(New Zealand) Neil Cunningham	9–10, 12
(United Kingdom) Point Preparation	Porsche 911 GT2	Porsche 3.6 L Turbo Flat-6	4	(United Kingdom) Peter Cook	3–4, 6
(United Kingdom) Point Preparation	Porsche 911 GT2	Porsche 3.6 L Turbo Flat-6	4	(United Kingdom) Phil Hindley	3–4, 6
(United Kingdom) Mike Haines Racing	Lotus Esprit	Lotus 3.5 L Type 918 V8	6	(United Kingdom) Ian Astley	All
(United Kingdom) Mike Haines Racing	Lotus Esprit	Lotus 3.5 L Type 918 V8	6	(United Kingdom) Chris Ellis	All
(United Kingdom) NCK Motorsport	Marcos LM600	Chevrolet 5.9 L V8	8	(Brazil) Thomas Erdos	All
(United Kingdom) NCK Motorsport	Marcos LM600	Chevrolet 5.9 L V8	8	(United Kingdom) Andy Purvis	All
(United Kingdom) NCK Motorsport	Marcos LM600	Chevrolet 5.9 L V8	9	(United Kingdom) Martin Byford	All
(United Kingdom) NCK Motorsport	Marcos LM600	Chevrolet 5.9 L V8	9	(Netherlands) Michael Vergers	1
(United Kingdom) NCK Motorsport	Marcos LM600	Chevrolet 5.9 L V8	9	(United Kingdom) David Leslie	2, 4–7, 10
(United Kingdom) NCK Motorsport	Marcos LM600	Chevrolet 5.9 L V8	9	(United Kingdom) Calum Lockie	3
(United Kingdom) NCK Motorsport	Marcos LM600	Chevrolet 5.9 L V8	9	(United Kingdom) Justin Keen	8
(United Kingdom) NCK Motorsport	Marcos LM600	Chevrolet 5.9 L V8	9	(United Kingdom) Matt Edwards	9, 11–12
(United Kingdom) Pro-Tran Competition	Venturi 600 LM	Renault PRV 3.0 L V6	11	(United Kingdom) Paul Cope	7, 9, 11–12
(United Kingdom) Pro-Tran Competition	Venturi 600 LM	Renault PRV 3.0 L V6	11	(United Kingdom) David Smith	7, 9, 12
(United Kingdom) Pro-Tran Competition	Venturi 600 LM	Renault PRV 3.0 L V6	11	(United Kingdom) Glenn Dudley	11
(United Kingdom) PK Sport	Porsche 911 GT2	Porsche 3.6 L Turbo Flat-6	12	(United Kingdom) Jamie Masarati	1–10, 12
(United Kingdom) PK Sport	Porsche 911 GT2	Porsche 3.6 L Turbo Flat-6	12	(United Kingdom) Piers Masarati	1–6, 8–10, 12
(United Kingdom) PK Sport	Porsche 911 GT2	Porsche 3.6 L Turbo Flat-6	14	(United Kingdom) Robert Babikan	1–7, 9–11
(United Kingdom) PK Sport	Porsche 911 GT2	Porsche 3.6 L Turbo Flat-6	14	(United Kingdom) Terry Rymer	1–2
(United Kingdom) PK Sport	Porsche 911 GT2	Porsche 3.6 L Turbo Flat-6	14	(United Kingdom) Brian Robinson	3
(United Kingdom) PK Sport	Porsche 911 GT2	Porsche 3.6 L Turbo Flat-6	14	(United Kingdom) Fred Moss	4–7, 9–12
(United Kingdom) PK Sport	Porsche 911 GT2	Porsche 3.6 L Turbo Flat-6	14	(United Kingdom) Andrew Christopher	8
(United Kingdom) PK Sport	Porsche 911 GT2	Porsche 3.6 L Turbo Flat-6	14	(United Kingdom) Stephen Radcliffe	8
(United Kingdom) PK Sport	Porsche 911 GT2	Porsche 3.6 L Turbo Flat-6	14	(United Kingdom) Michael Pickup	12
(United Kingdom) Lister Cars	Lister Storm	Jaguar 7.0 L V12	15	(United Kingdom) Paul Evans	6
(United Kingdom) Lister Cars	Lister Storm	Jaguar 7.0 L V12	15	(United Kingdom) William Hewland	6
(United Kingdom) SCS Motorsport	Ferrari F40	Ferrari 3.5 L V8	16	(United Kingdom) Stuart Bowler	4–7, 9, 11–12
(United Kingdom) SCS Motorsport	Ferrari F40	Ferrari 3.5 L V8	16	(United Kingdom) Ian Hetherington	4–7, 9, 11
(United Kingdom) SCS Motorsport	Ferrari F40	Ferrari 3.5 L V8	16	(United Kingdom) Ian Flux	12
(United Kingdom) Speedworx	Ultima GTR	Chevrolet 6.0 L V8	17	(United Kingdom) Mark Pashley	2–12
(United Kingdom) Speedworx	Ultima GTR	Chevrolet 6.0 L V8	17	(United Kingdom) Terry Pudwell	2–12
(United Kingdom) CSi Brookspeed Racing	Chrysler Viper GTS-R	Chrysler 356-T6 8.0 L V10	20	(United Kingdom) Dave Clark	3–9
(United Kingdom) CSi Brookspeed Racing	Chrysler Viper GTS-R	Chrysler 356-T6 8.0 L V10	20	(United Kingdom) John Cleland	3–8
(United Kingdom) CSi Brookspeed Racing	Chrysler Viper GTS-R	Chrysler 356-T6 8.0 L V10	20	(New Zealand) Neil Cunningham	6
(United Kingdom) CSi Brookspeed Racing	Chrysler Viper GTS-R	Chrysler 356-T6 8.0 L V10	20	(United Kingdom) Mike Wilds	9
(United Kingdom) CSi Brookspeed Racing	Lister Storm	Jaguar 7.0 L V12	20	(United Kingdom) Dave Clark	11–12
(United Kingdom) CSi Brookspeed Racing	Lister Storm	Jaguar 7.0 L V12	20	(United Kingdom) Tiff Needell	11–12
(United Kingdom) AC Automotive	Chevrolet Camaro	Chevrolet 6.0 L V8	26	(United Kingdom) Andrew Chester	1–10, 12
(United Kingdom) AC Automotive	Chevrolet Camaro	Chevrolet 6.0 L V8	26	(United Kingdom) Valentino Musetti	3, 10
(United Kingdom) AC Automotive	Chevrolet Camaro	Chevrolet 6.0 L V8	26	(United Kingdom) Richard Wood	4–9
(United Kingdom) TVR Engineering	TVR Cerbera Speed 12	TVR 7.7 L V12	27	(United Kingdom) Ian McKellar	All
(United Kingdom) TVR Engineering	TVR Cerbera Speed 12	TVR 7.7 L V12	27	(United Kingdom) Bobby Verdon-Roe	All
(United Kingdom) HKM Parr Motorsport	Chrysler Viper GTS-R	Chrysler 356-T6 8.0 L V10	28	(United Kingdom) Stephen Day	1–6, 8–12
(United Kingdom) HKM Parr Motorsport	Chrysler Viper GTS-R	Chrysler 356-T6 8.0 L V10	28	(New Zealand) Neil Cunningham	1–6, 8
(United Kingdom) HKM Parr Motorsport	Chrysler Viper GTS-R	Chrysler 356-T6 8.0 L V10	28	(United Kingdom) Tim Harvey	9–12
(Netherlands) Marcos Racing International	Marcos Mantara LM600EVO	Chevrolet 5.9 L V8	30	(United Kingdom) Calum Lockie	All
(Netherlands) Marcos Racing International	Marcos Mantara LM600EVO	Chevrolet 5.9 L V8	30	(Belgium) Bernard de Dryver	1
(Netherlands) Marcos Racing International	Marcos Mantara LM600EVO	Chevrolet 5.9 L V8	30	(Netherlands) Cor Euser	2, 4–7, 9–12
(Netherlands) Marcos Racing International	Marcos Mantara LM600EVO	Chevrolet 5.9 L V8	30	(United Kingdom) Kurt Luby	3, 8
(United Kingdom) Dave Welz Racing	Porsche 911 GT2	Porsche 3.6 L Turbo Flat-6	33	(United Kingdom) Dave Welz	11–12
(United Kingdom) Mark Miller Racing	Venturi 600 LM	Renault PRV 3.0 L V6	37	(United Kingdom) Mark Miller	11–12
(Sweden) HS Racing	Chrysler Viper GTS-R	Chrysler 356-T6 8.0 L V10	39	(Sweden) Henrik Roos	11
(Sweden) HS Racing	Chrysler Viper GTS-R	Chrysler 356-T6 8.0 L V10	39	(Sweden) Carl Rosenblad	11

=== GTO ===
Team	Car	Engine	No.	Drivers	Rounds
(United Kingdom) Sterling Motorsport	Lotus Elise	Rover 1.8 L K-series I4	41	(United Kingdom) V.J. Angelo	5–10
(United Kingdom) Sterling Motorsport	Lotus Elise	Rover 1.8 L K-series I4	41	(United Kingdom) Nils Baker	5–6, 8–10
(United Kingdom) Sterling Motorsport	Lotus Elise	Rover 1.8 L K-series I4	41	(United Kingdom) Howard Redhouse	7
(United Kingdom) PK Sport	Porsche 911 GT3-R	Porsche 3.6 L Flat-6	42	(United Kingdom) Geoff Lister	All
(United Kingdom) PK Sport	Porsche 911 GT3-R	Porsche 3.6 L Flat-6	42	(United Kingdom) Adam Simmons	1–2
(United Kingdom) PK Sport	Porsche 911 GT3-R	Porsche 3.6 L Flat-6	42	(United Kingdom) Terry Rymer	3–12
(United Kingdom) PK Sport	Porsche 911 GT3-R	Porsche 3.6 L Flat-6	44	(United Kingdom) Marcus Fothergill	1–10, 12
(United Kingdom) PK Sport	Porsche 911 GT3-R	Porsche 3.6 L Flat-6	44	(United Kingdom) Paul Fuller	1–10, 12
(United Kingdom) HKM Parr Motorsport	Chrysler Viper GTS	Chrysler 8.0 L V10	48	(United Kingdom) Curtis Hayles	All
(United Kingdom) HKM Parr Motorsport	Chrysler Viper GTS	Chrysler 8.0 L V10	48	(United Kingdom) Kilian Konig	All
(United Kingdom) G-Force Motorsport	Porsche 911 GT3-R	Porsche 3.6 L Flat-6	50	(United Kingdom) John Greasley	11
(United Kingdom) G-Force Motorsport	Porsche 911 GT3-R	Porsche 3.6 L Flat-6	50	(United Kingdom) John Morrison	11
(United Kingdom) Rollcentre Racing	TVR Cerbera Speed 6	TVR 4.5 L L6	55	(United Kingdom) Rob Barff	2–12
(United Kingdom) Rollcentre Racing	TVR Cerbera Speed 6	TVR 4.5 L L6	55	(United Kingdom) Martin Short	2–12
(United Kingdom) Cirtek Motorsport	Porsche 911 GT3-R	Porsche 3.6 L Flat-6	59	(United Kingdom) Warren Hughes	1, 3
(United Kingdom) Cirtek Motorsport	Porsche 911 GT3-R	Porsche 3.6 L Flat-6	59	(United Kingdom) John Cleland	1
(United Kingdom) Cirtek Motorsport	Porsche 911 GT3-R	Porsche 3.6 L Flat-6	59	(United Kingdom) Ian Gibbons	2
(United Kingdom) Cirtek Motorsport	Porsche 911 GT3-R	Porsche 3.6 L Flat-6	59	(United Kingdom) Paul Phillips	2
(United Kingdom) Cirtek Motorsport	Porsche 911 GT3-R	Porsche 3.6 L Flat-6	59	(United Kingdom) Adam Simmons	3–7, 9–12
(United Kingdom) Cirtek Motorsport	Porsche 911 GT3-R	Porsche 3.6 L Flat-6	59	(United Kingdom) Ian Flux	4–5
(United Kingdom) Cirtek Motorsport	Porsche 911 GT3-R	Porsche 3.6 L Flat-6	59	(United Kingdom) Robert Schirle	6
(United Kingdom) Cirtek Motorsport	Porsche 911 GT3-R	Porsche 3.6 L Flat-6	59	(United Kingdom) Piers Masarati	7
(United Kingdom) Cirtek Motorsport	Porsche 911 GT3-R	Porsche 3.6 L Flat-6	59	(South Africa) Stephen Watson	9–12
(United Kingdom) Zest Performance	Ferrari F355 Challenge	Ferrari 3.5 L V8	60	(United Kingdom) Marco Attard	1–6
(United Kingdom) Zest Performance	Ferrari F355 Challenge	Ferrari 3.5 L V8	60	(United Kingdom) Neil Woodford	1–6
(United Kingdom) Zest Performance	Ferrari 360 Modena	Ferrari 3.6 L V8	60	(United Kingdom) Marco Attard	9–12
(United Kingdom) Zest Performance	Ferrari 360 Modena	Ferrari 3.6 L V8	60	(United Kingdom) Neil Woodford	9–12
(United Kingdom) Zest Performance	Marcos Mantis	Ford 4.6 L V8	80	(United Kingdom) Rory Fordyce	9
(United Kingdom) Zest Performance	Marcos Mantis	Ford 4.6 L V8	80	(United Kingdom) Ben Orza	9
(United Kingdom) CBH Racing	Marcos Mantis	Ford 5.0 L V8	61	(United Kingdom) Charlie Butler-Henderson	All
(United Kingdom) CBH Racing	Marcos Mantis	Ford 5.0 L V8	61	(United Kingdom) Chris Ryan	1–4
(United Kingdom) CBH Racing	Marcos Mantis	Ford 5.0 L V8	61	(United Kingdom) Stephen Stokoe	5–12
(United Kingdom) CBH Racing	Marcos Mantis	Ford 5.0 L V8	84	(United Kingdom) Stephen Stokoe	1–2
(United Kingdom) CBH Racing	Marcos Mantis	Ford 5.0 L V8	84	(United Kingdom) Ben McLoughlin	1–2
(United Kingdom) EMKA Racing	Porsche 911 GT3-R	Porsche 3.6 L Flat-6	66	(United Kingdom) Steve O'Rourke	11
(United Kingdom) EMKA Racing	Porsche 911 GT3-R	Porsche 3.6 L Flat-6	66	(United Kingdom) Tim Sugden	11
(United Kingdom) Team Eurotech	Porsche 911 GT3-R	Porsche 3.6 L Flat-6	67	(United Kingdom) Paul Mace	11–12
(United Kingdom) Team Eurotech	Porsche 911 GT3-R	Porsche 3.6 L Flat-6	67	(United Kingdom) Adrian Slater	11–12
(United Kingdom) Team Eurotech	Porsche 911 GT3-R	Porsche 3.6 L Flat-6	77	(United Kingdom) Mark Sumpter	All
(United Kingdom) Team Eurotech	Porsche 911 GT3-R	Porsche 3.6 L Flat-6	77	(United Kingdom) Mike Jordan	1–2, 4–12
(United Kingdom) Team Eurotech	Porsche 911 GT3-R	Porsche 3.6 L Flat-6	77	(United Kingdom) Chris Goodwin	3
(United Kingdom) Griffiths Motorsport	Marcos Mantis	Ford 5.0 L V8	69	(United Kingdom) John Griffiths	1–11
(United Kingdom) Griffiths Motorsport	Marcos Mantis	Ford 5.0 L V8	69	(United Kingdom) Andrew Delahunty	1–3
(United Kingdom) Griffiths Motorsport	Marcos Mantis	Ford 5.0 L V8	69	(United Kingdom) Shane Bland	4, 6, 12
(United Kingdom) Griffiths Motorsport	Marcos Mantis	Ford 5.0 L V8	69	(United Kingdom) Ben McLoughlin	5–12
(United Kingdom) Griffiths Motorsport	Marcos Mantis	Ford 5.0 L V8	94	(United Kingdom) Shane Bland	9
(United Kingdom) Griffiths Motorsport	Marcos Mantis	Ford 5.0 L V8	94	(United Kingdom) Michael Mallock	9
(United Kingdom) Griffiths Motorsport	Marcos Mantis	Ford 5.0 L V8	96	(United Kingdom) Shane Bland	11
(United Kingdom) Griffiths Motorsport	Marcos Mantis	Ford 5.0 L V8	96	(United Kingdom) Nigel Woollcott	11
(United Kingdom) Henessey Racing	Lancia Stratos Corse	Alfa Romeo 3.0 L V6	70	(United Kingdom) Tony Soper	All
(United Kingdom) Henessey Racing	Lancia Stratos Corse	Alfa Romeo 3.0 L V6	70	(United Kingdom) Martin Parsons	1–8
(United Kingdom) Henessey Racing	Lancia Stratos Corse	Alfa Romeo 3.0 L V6	70	(United Kingdom) Chris Snowdon	9–12
(Sweden) FS Motorsport	Porsche 911 GT3-R	Porsche 3.6 L Flat-6	71	(Sweden) Krister Andersson	11
(Sweden) FS Motorsport	Porsche 911 GT3-R	Porsche 3.6 L Flat-6	71	(Sweden) Fredrik Sundberg	11
(Netherlands) Marcos Racing International	Marcos Mantis	Ford 4.6 L V8	75	(Netherlands) Harry Stoeltie*	6
(Netherlands) Marcos Racing International	Marcos Mantis	Ford 4.6 L V8	90	(Netherlands) Harry Stoeltie*	5
(Netherlands) Marcos Racing International	Marcos Mantis	Ford 4.6 L V8	78	(Netherlands) Rob Knook*	6
(Netherlands) Marcos Racing International	Marcos Mantis	Ford 4.6 L V8	89	(Netherlands) Herman Buurman*	6–7
(Netherlands) Marcos Racing International	Marcos Mantis	Ford 4.6 L V8	96	(Netherlands) Herman Buurman*	3
(Netherlands) Marcos Racing International	Marcos Mantis	Ford 4.6 L V8	95	(Netherlands) Mathew van Diessen*	6
(Netherlands) Marcos Racing International	Marcos Mantis	Ford 4.6 L V8	95	(Netherlands) Harald Roelse*	6
(United Kingdom) Balfe Motorsport	Lotus Esprit	Lotus 3.5 L Type 918 V8	76	(United Kingdom) Shaun Balfe	3–12
(United Kingdom) Balfe Motorsport	Lotus Esprit	Lotus 3.5 L Type 918 V8	76	(United Kingdom) Nigel Taylor	3–12
(Netherlands) PVK Racing	Marcos Mantis	Ford 4.6 L V8	78	(Netherlands) Jurgen van de Goorbergh*	11
(Netherlands) PVK Racing	Marcos Mantis	Ford 4.6 L V8	78	(Netherlands) Toon van de Haterd*	11
(Netherlands) AZ Motorsport	Marcos Mantis	Ford 4.6 L V8	79	(Netherlands) Arjan van der Zwaan*	11
(Netherlands) AZ Motorsport	Marcos Mantis	Ford 4.6 L V8	79	(Netherlands) Rob van der Zwaan*	11
(United Kingdom) Arrowstar Racing	Marcos Mantis	Ford 4.6 L V8	79	(United Kingdom) Andrew Delahunty*	12
(United Kingdom) Arrowstar Racing	Marcos Mantis	Ford 4.6 L V8	79	(United Kingdom) Mark Humphrey*	12
(United Kingdom) MCR	Marcos Mantis	Ford 4.6 L V8	80	(United Kingdom) Fred Moss	1–3
(United Kingdom) MCR	Marcos Mantis	Ford 4.6 L V8	80	(United Kingdom) Ben Orza	1–2, 4–7, 11–12
(United Kingdom) MCR	Marcos Mantis	Ford 4.6 L V8	80	(United Kingdom) Andrew Christopher	4
(United Kingdom) MCR	Marcos Mantis	Ford 4.6 L V8	80	(United Kingdom) Martin Crass	5–6, 12
(United Kingdom) MCR	Marcos Mantis	Ford 4.6 L V8	80	(United Kingdom) Marco Attard	7–8
(United Kingdom) MCR	Marcos Mantis	Ford 4.6 L V8	80	(United Kingdom) Neil Woodford	8
(United Kingdom) MCR	Marcos Mantis	Ford 4.6 L V8	80	(United Kingdom) Rory Fordyce	10–11
(United Kingdom) MCR	Marcos Mantis	Ford 4.6 L V8	80	(United Kingdom) Dave Thomas	10
(Netherlands) GD Motorsport	Marcos Mantis	Ford 4.6 L V8	81	(Netherlands) Harry Stoeltie*	11
(Netherlands) GD Motorsport	Marcos Mantis	Ford 4.6 L V8	81	(Netherlands) Mathew van Diessen*	11
(United Kingdom) CP Motorsport	Marcos Mantis	Ford 4.6 L V8	82	(United Kingdom) Gary Kinchin	10–12
(United Kingdom) CP Motorsport	Marcos Mantis	Ford 4.6 L V8	82	(United Kingdom) Jeff Wyatt	12
(United Kingdom) CP Motorsport	Marcos Mantis	Ford 4.6 L V8	83	(United Kingdom) Jeff Wyatt	1, 3–4, 9, 11
(United Kingdom) CP Motorsport	Marcos Mantis	Ford 4.6 L V8	83	(United Kingdom) Freddy Kinchin	1, 3, 9
(United Kingdom) CP Motorsport	Marcos Mantis	Ford 4.6 L V8	83	(United Kingdom) Andrew Delahunty	4–9, 11
(United Kingdom) CP Motorsport	Marcos Mantis	Ford 4.6 L V8	83	(United Kingdom) Matt Edwards	5–8
(United Kingdom) CP Motorsport	Marcos Mantis	Ford 4.6 L V8	91	(United Kingdom) Jeff Wyatt	7
(United Kingdom) CP Motorsport	Marcos LM500	Rover 5.0 L V8	83	(United Kingdom) Andrew Delahunty	10
(United Kingdom) CP Motorsport	Marcos LM500	Rover 5.0 L V8	83	(United Kingdom) Jeff Wyatt	10
(United Kingdom) Speedworx	Marcos Mantis	Ford 4.6 L V8	83	(United Kingdom) Terry Pudwell	2
(United Kingdom) Classic Racing	Marcos Mantis	Ford 4.6 L V8	85	(United Kingdom) Alun Edwards*	1, 5–7, 9, 11
(United Kingdom) Classic Racing	Marcos Mantis	Ford 4.6 L V8	85	(United Kingdom) John Edwards*	1, 5–7, 9, 11
(Netherlands) Moritz Racing	Marcos Mantis	Ford 4.6 L V8	86	(Belgium) Eugene de la Croix*	6
(Netherlands) Moritz Racing	Marcos Mantis	Ford 4.6 L V8	86	(Netherlands) Bert Moritz*	6
(Netherlands) WR Motorsport	Marcos Mantis	Ford 4.6 L V8	86	(Netherlands) Tom Langeberg*	11
(Netherlands) WR Motorsport	Marcos Mantis	Ford 4.6 L V8	86	(Netherlands) Wout van Reenen*	11
(United Kingdom) CS Racing	Marcos Mantis	Ford 4.6 L V8	86	(United Kingdom) Colin Simpson*	12
(United Kingdom) David Dove Racing	Marcos Mantis	Ford 4.6 L V8	87	(United Kingdom) David Dove*	5, 9, 11–12
(United Kingdom) David Dove Racing	Marcos Mantis	Ford 4.6 L V8	87	(United Kingdom) Bill Tully*	5, 11
(United Kingdom) David Dove Racing	Marcos Mantis	Ford 4.6 L V8	87	(United Kingdom) Jim Beckley*	9, 12
(United Kingdom) David Dove Racing	Marcos Mantis	Ford 4.6 L V8	88	(United Kingdom) Bill Tully*	6, 9, 12
(United Kingdom) David Dove Racing	Marcos Mantis	Ford 4.6 L V8	88	(United Kingdom) David Dove*	6
(United Kingdom) David Dove Racing	Marcos Mantis	Ford 4.6 L V8	88	(United Kingdom) Ian Stinton*	9
(Netherlands) NV Motorsport	Marcos Mantis	Ford 4.6 L V8	88	(Netherlands) Nico Verdoes*	11
(Netherlands) Eurotech Racing	Marcos Mantis	Ford 4.6 L V8	89	(Netherlands) Herman Buurman*	11
(Netherlands) Eurotech Racing	Marcos Mantis	Ford 4.6 L V8	89	(Belgium) Vincent Vosse*	11
(Netherlands) RK Motorsport	Marcos Mantis	Ford 4.6 L V8	90	(Netherlands) Rob Knook*	7, 11
(Netherlands) HK Motorsport	Marcos Mantis	Ford 4.6 L V8	92	(Netherlands) Gerry Deelstra*	11
(Netherlands) PS Motorsport	Marcos Mantis	Ford 4.6 L V8	93	(Netherlands) Pieter van Soelen*	11
(United Kingdom) Eclipse Motorsport	Marcos Mantis	Ford 4.6 L V8	94	(United Kingdom) Shane Bland*	6
(United Kingdom) Eclipse Motorsport	Marcos Mantis	Ford 4.6 L V8	94	(United Kingdom) Chris Pollard*	6
(United Kingdom) Eclipse Motorsport	Marcos Mantis	Ford 4.6 L V8	96	(United Kingdom) Chris Pollard*	7, 12
(United Kingdom) Eclipse Motorsport	Marcos Mantis	Ford 4.6 L V8	96	(United Kingdom) Cork*	7
(United Kingdom) Eclipse Motorsport	Marcos Mantis	Ford 4.6 L V8	96	(United Kingdom) John Griffiths*	12
(Netherlands) VDV Motorsport	Marcos Mantis	Ford 4.6 L V8	95	(Netherlands) Peter Classen*	11
(Netherlands) VDV Motorsport	Marcos Mantis	Ford 4.6 L V8	95	(Netherlands) John van de Voort*	11
(United Kingdom) Promotasport	Marcos Mantis	Ford 4.6 L V8	97	(United Kingdom) Andrew Davies	6–12
(United Kingdom) Promotasport	Marcos Mantis	Ford 4.6 L V8	97	(United Kingdom) Simon Harris	7
(United Kingdom) Promotasport	Marcos Mantis	Ford 4.6 L V8	97	(United Kingdom) Matt Bettley	8, 10, 12
(United Kingdom) Promotasport	Marcos Mantis	Ford 4.6 L V8	97	(United Kingdom) Richard Lyons	9, 11
(United Kingdom) Promotasport	Marcos Mantis	Ford 4.6 L V8	98	(United Kingdom) Grant Tromans*	12
(United Kingdom) Promotasport	Marcos Mantis	Ford 4.6 L V8	98	(United Kingdom) Ashley Ward*	12
(United Kingdom) Roger Heavens Racing	Marcos Mantis	Ford 4.6 L V8	99	(United Kingdom) Jon Holloway*	5–6, 9
(United Kingdom) Roger Heavens Racing	Marcos Mantis	Ford 4.6 L V8	99	(United Kingdom) Nick Staveley*	5–6, 9

^{*} Marcos Mantis challenge competitors, ineligible to score British GT points.

== Race results ==
=== GT ===
Event	Circuit	Pole position	Fastest lap	Winners
1	Thruxton Circuit	(United Kingdom) No. 28 HKM Parr Motorsport	(United Kingdom) No. 28 HKM Parr Motorsport	(United Kingdom) No. 1 Cirtek Motorsport
1	Thruxton Circuit	(New Zealand) Neil Cunningham (United Kingdom) Stephen Day	(New Zealand) Neil Cunningham (United Kingdom) Stephen Day	(United Kingdom) Robert Shircle (United Kingdom) David Warnock
2	Croft Circuit	(United Kingdom) No. 6 Mike Haines Racing	(United Kingdom) No. 6 Mike Haines Racing	(Netherlands) No. 30 Marcos Racing International
2	Croft Circuit	(United Kingdom) Ian Astley (United Kingdom) Chris Ellis	(United Kingdom) Ian Astley (United Kingdom) Chris Ellis	(Netherlands) Cor Euser (United Kingdom) Calum Lockie
3	Oulton Park	(United Kingdom) No. 8 NCK Motorsport	(United Kingdom) No. 3 Bob Waston Motorsport	(United Kingdom) No. 3 Bob Waston Motorsport
3	Oulton Park	(Brazil) Thomas Erdos (United Kingdom) Andy Purvis	(United Kingdom) Tim Harvey (United Kingdom) Mike Youles	(United Kingdom) Tim Harvey (United Kingdom) Mike Youles
4	Donington Park National	(Netherlands) No. 30 Marcos Racing International	(Netherlands) No. 30 Marcos Racing International	(United Kingdom) No. 1 Cirtek Motorsport
4	Donington Park National	(Netherlands) Cor Euser (United Kingdom) Calum Lockie	(Netherlands) Cor Euser (United Kingdom) Calum Lockie	(United Kingdom) Robert Shircle (United Kingdom) David Warnock
5	Silverstone National	(United Kingdom) No. 1 Cirtek Motorsport	(United Kingdom) No. 1 Cirtek Motorsport	(United Kingdom) No. 27 TVR Engineering
5	Silverstone National	(United Kingdom) Jamie Campbell-Walter (United Kingdom) David Warnock	(United Kingdom) Jamie Campbell-Walter (United Kingdom) David Warnock	(United Kingdom) Ian McKellar (United Kingdom) Bobby Verdon-Roe
6	Brands Hatch	(Netherlands) No. 30 Marcos Racing International	(Netherlands) No. 30 Marcos Racing International	(United Kingdom) No. 1 Cirtek Motorsport
6	Brands Hatch	(Netherlands) Cor Euser (United Kingdom) Calum Lockie	(Netherlands) Cor Euser (United Kingdom) Calum Lockie	(United Kingdom) Jamie Campbell-Walter (United Kingdom) David Warnock
7	Donington Park GP	(United Kingdom) No. 6 Mike Haines Racing	(Netherlands) No. 30 Marcos Racing International	(United Kingdom) No. 1 Cirtek Motorsport
7	Donington Park GP	(United Kingdom) Ian Astley (United Kingdom) Chris Ellis	(Netherlands) Cor Euser (United Kingdom) Calum Lockie	(United Kingdom) Tiff Needell (United Kingdom) David Warnock
8	Croft Circuit	(United Kingdom) No. 8 NCK Motorsport	(United Kingdom) No. 8 NCK Motorsport	(United Kingdom) No. 1 Cirtek Motorsport
8	Croft Circuit	(Brazil) Thomas Erdos (United Kingdom) Andy Purvis	(Brazil) Thomas Erdos (United Kingdom) Andy Purvis	(United Kingdom) Richard Dean (United Kingdom) David Warnock
9	Silverstone National	(United Kingdom) No. 1 Cirtek Motorsport	(Netherlands) No. 30 Marcos Racing International	(United Kingdom) No. 1 Cirtek Motorsport
9	Silverstone National	(United Kingdom) Jamie Campbell-Walter (United Kingdom) David Warnock	(Netherlands) Cor Euser (United Kingdom) Calum Lockie	(United Kingdom) Jamie Campbell-Walter (United Kingdom) David Warnock
10	Snetterton Circuit	(United Kingdom) No. 28 HKM Parr Motorsport	(United Kingdom) No. 28 HKM Parr Motorsport	(Netherlands) No. 30 Marcos Racing International
10	Snetterton Circuit	(United Kingdom) Stephen Day (United Kingdom) Tim Harvey	(United Kingdom) Stephen Day (United Kingdom) Tim Harvey	(Netherlands) Cor Euser (United Kingdom) Calum Lockie
11	Spa-Francorchamps	(United Kingdom) No. 1 Cirtek Motorsport	(United Kingdom) No. 1 Cirtek Motorsport	(United Kingdom) No. 20 CSi Brookspeed Racing
11	Spa-Francorchamps	(United Kingdom) Jamie Campbell-Walter (United Kingdom) David Warnock	(United Kingdom) Jamie Campbell-Walter (United Kingdom) David Warnock	(United Kingdom) Dave Clark (United Kingdom) Tiff Needell
12	Silverstone GP	(Netherlands) No. 30 Marcos Racing International	(United Kingdom) No. 1 Cirtek Motorsport	(United Kingdom) No. 20 CSi Brookspeed Racing
12	Silverstone GP	(Netherlands) Cor Euser (United Kingdom) Calum Lockie	(United Kingdom) Julian Bailey (United Kingdom) David Warnock	(United Kingdom) Dave Clark (United Kingdom) Tiff Needell

=== GTO ===
Event	Circuit	Pole position	Fastest lap	Winners
1	Thruxton Circuit	(United Kingdom) No. 77 Team Eurotech	(United Kingdom) No. 77 Team Eurotech	(United Kingdom) No. 77 Team Eurotech
1	Thruxton Circuit	(United Kingdom) Mike Jordan (United Kingdom) Mark Sumpter	(United Kingdom) Mike Jordan (United Kingdom) Mark Sumpter	(United Kingdom) Mike Jordan (United Kingdom) Mark Sumpter
2	Croft Circuit	(United Kingdom) No. 42 PK Sport	(United Kingdom) No. 42 PK Sport	(United Kingdom) No. 77 Team Eurotech
2	Croft Circuit	(United Kingdom) Geoff Lister (United Kingdom) Adam Simmons	(United Kingdom) Geoff Lister (United Kingdom) Adam Simmons	(United Kingdom) Mike Jordan (United Kingdom) Mark Sumpter
3	Oulton Park	(United Kingdom) No. 77 Team Eurotech	(United Kingdom) No. 55 Rollcentre Racing	(United Kingdom) No. 77 Team Eurotech
3	Oulton Park	(United Kingdom) Chris Goodwin (United Kingdom) Mark Sumpter	(United Kingdom) Rob Barff (United Kingdom) Martin Short	(United Kingdom) Chris Goodwin (United Kingdom) Mark Sumpter
4	Donington Park National	(United Kingdom) No. 77 Team Eurotech	(United Kingdom) No. 77 Team Eurotech	(United Kingdom) No. 44 PK Sport
4	Donington Park National	(United Kingdom) Mike Jordan (United Kingdom) Mark Sumpter	(United Kingdom) Mike Jordan (United Kingdom) Mark Sumpter	(United Kingdom) Marcus Fothergill (United Kingdom) Paul Fuller
5	Silverstone National	(United Kingdom) No. 55 Rollcentre Racing	(United Kingdom) No. 77 Team Eurotech	(United Kingdom) No. 77 Team Eurotech
5	Silverstone National	(United Kingdom) Rob Barff (United Kingdom) Martin Short	(United Kingdom) Mike Jordan (United Kingdom) Mark Sumpter	(United Kingdom) Mike Jordan (United Kingdom) Mark Sumpter
6	Brands Hatch	(United Kingdom) No. 77 Team Eurotech	(United Kingdom) No. 77 Team Eurotech	(United Kingdom) No. 77 Team Eurotech
6	Brands Hatch	(United Kingdom) Mike Jordan (United Kingdom) Mark Sumpter	(United Kingdom) Mike Jordan (United Kingdom) Mark Sumpter	(United Kingdom) Mike Jordan (United Kingdom) Mark Sumpter
7	Donington Park GP	(United Kingdom) No. 42 PK Sport	(United Kingdom) No. 42 PK Sport	(United Kingdom) No. 77 Team Eurotech
7	Donington Park GP	(United Kingdom) Geoff Lister (United Kingdom) Terry Rymer	(United Kingdom) Geoff Lister (United Kingdom) Terry Rymer	(United Kingdom) Mike Jordan (United Kingdom) Mark Sumpter
8	Croft Circuit	(United Kingdom) No. 42 PK Sport	(United Kingdom) No. 77 Team Eurotech	(United Kingdom) No. 77 Team Eurotech
8	Croft Circuit	(United Kingdom) Geoff Lister (United Kingdom) Terry Rymer	(United Kingdom) Mike Jordan (United Kingdom) Mark Sumpter	(United Kingdom) Mike Jordan (United Kingdom) Mark Sumpter
9	Silverstone National	(United Kingdom) No. 42 PK Sport	(United Kingdom) No. 42 PK Sport	(United Kingdom) No. 42 PK Sport
9	Silverstone National	(United Kingdom) Geoff Lister (United Kingdom) Terry Rymer	(United Kingdom) Geoff Lister (United Kingdom) Terry Rymer	(United Kingdom) Geoff Lister (United Kingdom) Terry Rymer
10	Snetterton Circuit	(United Kingdom) No. 59 Cirtek Motorsport	(United Kingdom) No. 55 Rollcentre Racing	(United Kingdom) No. 42 PK Sport
10	Snetterton Circuit	(United Kingdom) Adam Simmons (South Africa) Stephen Watson	(United Kingdom) Rob Barff (United Kingdom) Martin Short	(United Kingdom) Geoff Lister (United Kingdom) Terry Rymer
11	Spa-Francorchamps	(United Kingdom) No. 42 PK Sport	(United Kingdom) No. 42 PK Sport	(United Kingdom) No. 55 Rollcentre Racing
11	Spa-Francorchamps	(United Kingdom) Geoff Lister (United Kingdom) Terry Rymer	(United Kingdom) Geoff Lister (United Kingdom) Terry Rymer	(United Kingdom) Rob Barff (United Kingdom) Martin Short
12	Silverstone GP	(United Kingdom) No. 42 PK Sport	(United Kingdom) No. 42 PK Sport	(United Kingdom) No. 42 PK Sport
12	Silverstone GP	(United Kingdom) Geoff Lister (United Kingdom) Terry Rymer	(United Kingdom) Geoff Lister (United Kingdom) Terry Rymer	(United Kingdom) Geoff Lister (United Kingdom) Terry Rymer

== Championship Standings ==
Points are awarded as follows:

1st	2nd	3rd	4th	5th	6th	7th	8th	9th	10th
15	12	10	8	6	5	4	3	2	1

(key)

Pos.	Drivers	Team	THR	CRO	OUL	DON	SIL	BRH	DON	CRO	SIL	SNE	SPA	SIL	Points
GT
1	(United Kingdom) Calum Lockie	(Netherlands) Marcos Racing International	12	1		**3**	7	**2**	4	DNS	6	1	2	**4**	114
1	(United Kingdom) Calum Lockie	(United Kingdom) NCK Motorsport			2										114
2	(United Kingdom) David Warnock	(United Kingdom) Cirtek Motorsport	1	Ret	Ret	1	**11**†	1	1	1	**1**	Ret	Ret	2	108
3	(Netherlands) Cor Euser	(Netherlands) Marcos Racing International		1	WD	**3**	7	**2**	4		6	1	2	**4**	96
4	(United Kingdom) Ian Astley (United Kingdom) Chris Ellis	(United Kingdom) Mike Haines Racing	3	**Ret**	Ret	2	2	5	**2**	Ret	2	Ret	3	6	84
6	(United Kingdom) Ian McKellar (United Kingdom) Bobby Verdon-Roe	(United Kingdom) TVR Engineering	Ret	Ret	7†	Ret	1	3	Ret	4	9	Ret	4	3	60
8	(United Kingdom) Stephen Day	(United Kingdom) HKM Parr Motorsport	**2**	2	Ret	15	4	DNS		Ret	5	**2**	DNS	5	59
9	(United Kingdom) Tim Harvey	(United Kingdom) Bob Watson Motorsport			1	8†	Ret	WD	Ret	2					56
9	(United Kingdom) Tim Harvey	(United Kingdom) HKM Parr Motorsport									5	**2**	DNS	5	56
10	(United Kingdom) Martin Byford	(United Kingdom) NCK Motorsport	15	3	2	7	Ret	Ret	7	Ret	13	8	10	15	55
11	(New Zealand) Neil Cunningham	(United Kingdom) HKM Parr Motorsport	**2**	2	Ret	15	4	DNS		Ret					52
11	(New Zealand) Neil Cunningham	(United Kingdom) CSi Brookspeed Racing						7							52
11	(New Zealand) Neil Cunningham	(United Kingdom) Bob Watson Motorsport									7	3		7	52
12	(United Kingdom) Mike Youles	(United Kingdom) Bob Watson Motorsport			1	8†	Ret	WD	Ret	2	7	3		7	49
13	(United Kingdom) Dave Clark	(United Kingdom) CSi Brookspeed Racing			Ret	4	3	7	3	WD	3		1	1	43
14	(United Kingdom) Jamie Masarati	(United Kingdom) PK Sport	8	7	8	Ret	10	11	14	WD	12	9		18	39
15	(United Kingdom) Piers Masarati	(United Kingdom) PK Sport	8	7	8	Ret	10	11		WD	12	9		18	36
16	(United Kingdom) Robert Schirle	(United Kingdom) Cirtek Motorsport	1	Ret	Ret	1								11	33
16	(United Kingdom) Jamie Campbell-Walter	(United Kingdom) Cirtek Motorsport					**11**†	1			**1**		Ret		33
16	(Brazil) Thomas Erdos (United Kingdom) Andy Purvis	(United Kingdom) NCK Motorsport	DNS	Ret	**Ret**	Ret	8	6	Ret	**3**	4	Ret	Ret	8	33
20	(United Kingdom) John Cleland	(United Kingdom) CSi Brookspeed Racing			Ret	4	3	WD	3	WD	3				28
21	(United Kingdom) David Leslie	(United Kingdom) NCK Motorsport		3		7	Ret	Ret	7			8			27
22	(United Kingdom) Robert Babikan	(United Kingdom) PK Sport	Ret	Ret	6	5	WD	8	5		Ret	WD	Ret		24
23	(Australia) Charlie Cox	(United Kingdom) Cirtek Motorsport							9			Ret	9	11	17
24	(United Kingdom) Fred Moss	(United Kingdom) PK Sport				5	WD	8	5		Ret	WD	Ret	17	16
25	(United Kingdom) Tiff Needell	(United Kingdom) Cirtek Motorsport							1						15
25	(United Kingdom) Tiff Needell	(United Kingdom) CSi Brookspeed Racing											1	1	15
25	(United Kingdom) Richard Dean	(United Kingdom) Cirtek Motorsport								1		Ret			15
25	(United Kingdom) Julian Bailey	(United Kingdom) Cirtek Motorsport												2	15
25	(United Kingdom) Peter Cook (United Kingdom) Phil Hindley	(United Kingdom) Point Preparation			3	6		WD							15
30	(United Kingdom) Jonathan Baker	(United Kingdom) Cirtek Motorsport							9			Ret	9		14
31	(United Kingdom) Andrew Chester	(United Kingdom) AC Automotive	17	NC	DNS	Ret	Ret	21†	18†	Ret	Ret	12		22	12
32	(United Kingdom) Matt Edwards	(United Kingdom) NCK Motorsport									13		10	15	11
33	(United Kingdom) Mike Wilds	(United Kingdom) CSi Brookspeed Racing									3				10
34	(United Kingdom) Brian Robinson	(United Kingdom) PK Sport			6										8
34	(United Kingdom) Mark Pashley (United Kingdom) Terry Pudwell	(United Kingdom) Speedworx		WD	11	14	Ret	Ret	15	Ret	Ret	WD	Ret	Ret	8
37	(Belgium) Bernard de Dryver	(Netherlands) Marcos Racing International	12												6
38	(United Kingdom) Valentino Musetti	(United Kingdom) AC Automotive			DNS							12			5
38	(Netherlands) Michael Vergers	(United Kingdom) NCK Motorsport	15												5
38	(United Kingdom) Paul Cope	(United Kingdom) Pro-Tran Competition							22		DNS		29	21	5
38	(United Kingdom) Glenn Dudley	(United Kingdom) Pro-Tran Competition											29		5
42	(United Kingdom) Stuart Bowler	(United Kingdom) SCS				Ret	Ret	WD	20		WD		DNS	16	1
42	(United Kingdom) Ian Flux	(United Kingdom) SCS												16	1
42	(United Kingdom) Richard Wood	(United Kingdom) AC Automotive				Ret	Ret	DNS	18†	Ret	Ret				1
	(United Kingdom) Michael Pickup	(United Kingdom) PK Sport												17	0
	(United Kingdom) Ian Hetherington	(United Kingdom) SCS				Ret	Ret	WD	20		WD		DNS		0
	(United Kingdom) David Smith	(United Kingdom) Pro-Tran Competition							22		DNS			21	0
	(United Kingdom) Terry Rymer	(United Kingdom) PK Sport	Ret	Ret											0
	(United Kingdom) Justin Keen	(United Kingdom) NCK Motorsport								Ret					0
	(United Kingdom) Andrew Christopher (United Kingdom) Stephen Radcliffe	(United Kingdom) PK Sport								Ret					0
	(United Kingdom) Kurt Luby	(Netherlands) Marcos Racing International			WD					DNS					0
Drivers ineligible to score points
	(United Kingdom) Paul Evans (United Kingdom) William Hewland	(United Kingdom) Lister Cars						4							0
	(Sweden) Henrik Roos (Sweden) Carl Rosenblad	(Sweden) Henrik Roos Viper Team											27		0
	(United Kingdom) Dave Welz	(United Kingdom) Dave Welz Racing											WD	31	0
	(United Kingdom) Mark Miller	(United Kingdom) Mark Miller Racing											Ret	WD	0
GTO
1	(United Kingdom) Mark Sumpter	(United Kingdom) Team Eurotech	**4**	4	**4**	**12**	5	**9**	6	5	10	5	7	19	152
2	(United Kingdom) Mike Jordan	(United Kingdom) Team Eurotech	**4**	4		**12**	5	**9**	6	5	10	5	7	19	137
3	(United Kingdom) Geoff Lister	(United Kingdom) PK Sport	6	**8**	5	Ret	6	DNS	**10**	**DNS**	**8**	4	**6**	**9**	109
4	(United Kingdom) Terry Rymer	(United Kingdom) PK Sport			5	Ret	6	DNS	**10**	**DNS**	**8**	4	**6**	**9**	91
5	(United Kingdom) Adam Simmons	(United Kingdom) PK Sport	6	**8**											78
5	(United Kingdom) Adam Simmons	(United Kingdom) Cirtek Motorsport			Ret	13	WD	12	12		11	**6**	8	12	78
6	(United Kingdom) Rob Barff (United Kingdom) Martin Short	(United Kingdom) Rollcentre Racing		Ret	Ret	Ret	**DNS**	10	8	7	Ret	11†	5	10	66
8	(United Kingdom) Marcus Fothergill (United Kingdom) Paul Fuller	(United Kingdom) PK Sport	9	5	Ret	9	Ret	13	21	6	20†	15†		WD	62
10	(United Kingdom) John Griffiths	(United Kingdom) Griffiths Motorsport	14	12	DNS	DSQ	12	27†	11	Ret	14	7	18		46
10	(United Kingdom) John Griffiths	(United Kingdom) Eclipse Motorsport												27	46
11	(United Kingdom) Ben McLoughlin	(United Kingdom) CBH Racing	7	WD											45
11	(United Kingdom) Ben McLoughlin	(United Kingdom) Griffiths Motorsport					12	27†	11	Ret	14	7	18	14	45
12	(United Kingdom) Charlie Butler-Henderson	(United Kingdom) CBH Racing	13	6	12	10	Ret	Ret	13	Ret	WD	DNS	23	Ret	42
13	(United Kingdom) Curtis Hayles (United Kingdom) Kilian Konig	(United Kingdom) HKM Parr Motorsport	Ret	9	Ret	11	9	Ret	Ret	Ret	Ret	Ret	13	13	40
15	(South Africa) Stephen Watson	(United Kingdom) Cirtek Motorsport									11	**6**	8	12	38
16	(United Kingdom) Chris Ryan	(United Kingdom) CBH Racing	13	6	12	10									35
17	(United Kingdom) Marco Attard	(United Kingdom) Zest Performance	10	11	10	Ret	15	28†		WD	Ret	Ret	Ret	Ret	33
17	(United Kingdom) Marco Attard	(United Kingdom) MCR							27	9					33
17	(United Kingdom) Neil Woodford	(United Kingdom) Zest Performance	10	11	10	Ret	15	28†		WD	Ret	Ret	Ret	Ret	33
17	(United Kingdom) Neil Woodford	(United Kingdom) MCR								9					33
19	(United Kingdom) Tony Soper	(United Kingdom) Henessey Racing	16	14	14	Ret	19	26	24	Ret	19	13	WD	Ret	26
20	(United Kingdom) Andrew Davies	(United Kingdom) Promotasport						24	16	8	16	Ret	20	25	24
21	(United Kingdom) Martin Parsons	(United Kingdom) Henessey Racing	16	14	14	Ret	19	26	24	Ret					18
22	(United Kingdom) Chris Goodwin	(United Kingdom) Team Eurotech			**4**										15
22	(United Kingdom) Andrew Delahunty	(United Kingdom) Griffiths Motorsport	14	12	DNS										15
22	(United Kingdom) Andrew Delahunty	(United Kingdom) CP Motorsport				16	16	22	19	WD	WD	Ret	WD		15
22	(United Kingdom) Andrew Delahunty	(United Kingdom) Arrowstar Racing												26	15
24	(United Kingdom) Gary Kinchin	(United Kingdom) CP Motorsport										10	22	24	14
25	(United Kingdom) Warren Hughes	(United Kingdom) Cirtek Motorsport	5		Ret										12
25	(United Kingdom) John Cleland	(United Kingdom) Cirtek Motorsport	5												12
25	(United Kingdom) Ben Orza	(United Kingdom) MCR	Ret	13		17	20	DNS	27				WD	Ret	12
25	(United Kingdom) Ben Orza	(United Kingdom) Zest Performance									21				12
28	(United Kingdom) Robert Schirle	(United Kingdom) Cirtek Motorsport						12							10
28	(United Kingdom) Matt Bettley	(United Kingdom) Promotasport								8		Ret		25	10
28	(United Kingdom) V.J. Angelo	(United Kingdom) Sterling Motorsport					18	Ret	DNS	10	Ret	Ret			10
28	(United Kingdom) Nils Baker	(United Kingdom) Sterling Motorsport					18	Ret		10	Ret	Ret			10
28	(United Kingdom) Shaun Balfe (United Kingdom) Nigel Taylor	(United Kingdom) Balfe Motorsport			WD	Ret	WD	23	Ret	Ret	15	Ret	Ret	Ret	10
34	(United Kingdom) Martin Crass	(United Kingdom) MCR					20	18						Ret	9
34	(United Kingdom) Richard Lyons	(United Kingdom) Promotasport									16		20		9
36	(United Kingdom) Chris Snowdon	(United Kingdom) Henessey Racing									19	13	WD	Ret	8
36	(United Kingdom) Matt Edwards	(United Kingdom) CP Motorsport					16	22	19	WD					8
38	(United Kingdom) Stephen Stokoe	(United Kingdom) CBH Racing	7	WD			Ret	Ret	13	Ret	WD	DNS	23	Ret	7
39	(United Kingdom) Shane Bland	(United Kingdom) Griffiths Motorsport				DSQ		DNS			Ret		26	14	6
39	(United Kingdom) Shane Bland	(United Kingdom) Eclipse Motorsport						14							6
39	(United Kingdom) Piers Masarati	(United Kingdom) Cirtek Motorsport							12						6
39	(United Kingdom) Ian Flux	(United Kingdom) Cirtek Motorsport				13	WD								6
42	(United Kingdom) Ian Gibbons (United Kingdom) Paul Phillips	(United Kingdom) Cirtek Motorsport		10											5
42	(United Kingdom) Andrew Christopher	(United Kingdom) MCR				17									5
42	(United Kingdom) Jeff Wyatt	(United Kingdom) CP Motorsport	11		13	16			17		22†	Ret	WD	24	5
42	(United Kingdom) Rory Fordyce	(United Kingdom) Zest Performance									21				5
42	(United Kingdom) Rory Fordyce	(United Kingdom) MCR										14	WD		5
47	(United Kingdom) Simon Harris	(United Kingdom) Promotasport							16						4
48	(United Kingdom) Dave Thomas	(United Kingdom) MCR										14			3
49	(United Kingdom) Fred Moss	(United Kingdom) MCR	Ret	13	Ret										2
	(United Kingdom) Howard Redhouse	(United Kingdom) Sterling Motorsport							DNS						0
Drivers ineligible to score points
	(Netherlands) Herman Buurman*	(Netherlands) Marcos Racing International			9			15	26						0
	(Netherlands) Herman Buurman*	(Netherlands) Eurotech Racing											17		0
	(United Kingdom) Freddy Kinchin*	(United Kingdom) CP Motorsport	11		13						22†				0
	(United Kingdom) Steve O'Rourke (United Kingdom) Tim Sugden	(United Kingdom) EMKA Racing											11		0
	(United Kingdom) Paul Mace (United Kingdom) Adrian Slater	(United Kingdom) Team Eurotech											12	20	0
	(Netherlands) Harry Stoeltie*	(Netherlands) Marcos Racing International					13	16							0
	(Netherlands) Harry Stoeltie*	(Netherlands) GD Motorsport											24		0
	(United Kingdom) Chris Pollard*	(United Kingdom) Eclipse Motorsport						14	23					27	0
	(United Kingdom) John Greasley (United Kingdom) John Morrison	(United Kingdom) G-Force Motorsport											14		0
	(United Kingdom) Jon Holloway* (United Kingdom) Nick Staveley*	(United Kingdom) Roger Heavens Racing					14	WD			Ret				0
	(Netherlands) Rob Knook*	(Netherlands) Marcos Racing International						Ret							0
	(Netherlands) Rob Knook*	(Netherlands) RK Motorsport							25				15		0
	(United Kingdom) Terry Pudwell*	(United Kingdom) Speedworx		15											0
	(Sweden) Krister Andersson (Sweden) William Hewland	(Sweden) FS Motorsport											16		0
	(United Kingdom) Bill Tully*	(United Kingdom) David Dove Racing					17	17			17		Ret	28	0
	(United Kingdom) David Dove*	(United Kingdom) David Dove Racing					17	17			18		Ret	29	0
	(United Kingdom) Ian Stinton*	(United Kingdom) David Dove Racing									17				0
	(Belgium) Vincent Vosse*	(Netherlands) Eurotech Racing											17		0
	(United Kingdom) Jim Beckley*	(United Kingdom) David Dove Racing									18				0
	(Netherlands) Matthew van Diessen*	(Netherlands) Marcos Racing International						19							0
	(Netherlands) Matthew van Diessen*	(Netherlands) GD Motorsport											24		0
	(Netherlands) Harald Roelse*	(Netherlands) Marcos Racing International						19							0
	(Netherlands) Peter Classen* (Netherlands) John van de Voort*	(Netherlands) VDV Motorsport											19		0
	(United Kingdom) Alun Edwards* (United Kingdom) John Edwards*	(United Kingdom) Classic Racing	Ret				Ret	20	Ret		Ret		Ret	30	0
	(Netherlands) Tom Langeberg* (Netherlands) Wout van Reenen*	(Netherlands) WR Motorsport											21		0
	(United Kingdom) Cork*	(United Kingdom) Eclipse Motorsport							23						0
	(Netherlands) Pieter van Soelen*	(Netherlands) PS Motorsport											23		0
	(United Kingdom) Grant Tromans* (United Kingdom) Ashley Ward*	(United Kingdom) Promotasport												23	0
	(Belgium) Eugene de la Croix* (Netherlands) Bert Moritz*	(Netherlands) Moritz Racing					25								0
	(Netherlands) Gerry Deelstra*	(Netherlands) HK Motorsport											25		0
	(United Kingdom) Nigel Woolcott*	(United Kingdom) Griffiths Motorsport											26		0
	(United Kingdom) Mark Humphrey*	(United Kingdom) Arrowstar Racing												26	0
	(Netherlands) Nico Verdoes*	(Netherlands) NV Motorsport											30		0
	(Netherlands) Arjan van der Zwaan* (Netherlands) Rob van der Zwaan*	(Netherlands) AZ Motorsport											Ret		0
	(Netherlands) Jurgen van de Goorbergh* (Netherlands) Toon van de Haterd*	(Netherlands) PVK Racing											Ret		0
	(United Kingdom) Colin Simpson*	(United Kingdom) CS Racing												Ret	0
Pos.	Drivers	Team	THR	CRO	OUL	DON	SIL	BRH	DON	CRO	SIL	SNE	SPA	SIL	Points

Key
Colour	Result
Gold	Winner
Silver	Second place
Bronze	Third place
Green	Other points position
Blue	Other classified position
Blue	Not classified, finished (NC)
Purple	Not classified, retired (Ret)
Red	Did not qualify (DNQ)
Red	Did not pre-qualify (DNPQ)
Black	Disqualified (DSQ)
White	Did not start (DNS)
White	Race cancelled (C)
Blank	Did not practice (DNP)
Blank	Excluded (EX)
Blank	Did not arrive (DNA)
Blank	Withdrawn (WD)
Blank	Did not enter (cell empty)
Text formatting	Meaning
**Bold**	Pole position
Italics	Fastest lap

† – Drivers did not finish the race, but were classified as they completed a sufficient number of laps. ^{*} Marcos Mantis challenge competitors
