= Robert Babikan =

British racing driver

- Nationality: British

British GT Championship
- Years active: 2000-2001
- Teams: PK Motorsport, Harlow Motorsport
- Starts: 10
- Wins: 0
- Poles: 0
- Best finish: 22nd in 2000

Previous series
- 2001 1996-2001: European Le Mans Series; Porsche Cup GB

Championship titles
- 1996: Porsche Cup GB

Robert Babikan was a British racing driver. He was most notable for competing in the British GT Championship in 2000 and 2001, and racing in a single round of the European Le Mans Series in 2001. He won the Porsche Cup GB in 1996._

== Career ==
=== Early career ===
In 1996, Babikan entered the Porsche Cup GB, and took both the Class 2 title, and the overall title, whilst driving a Porsche 911 Carrera. He moved into the Class 1 of the Porsche Cup GB in 1997, driving a Porsche 911 Carrera 2. He finished fifth in class, with 196 points. In 1998, Babikan remained in the Porsche Cup GB, driving a Porsche 911 Carrera 2. He finished in second in round five, held at Oulton Park, round nine, held at Castle Combe. and in round 12, held at Donington Park.

=== 2000 ===
Babikan made his first appearance in a major series in 2000, driving a PK Motorsport-entered Porsche 911 GT2 in the British GT Championship. He made his debut in the series in the opening round at Thruxton, partnering Terry Rymer, but retired from the race without completing a lap. The following round, held at Croft, saw the pair last ten laps before retiring once more. He was partnered by Brian Robinson at Oulton Park, and finished for the first time, taking sixth place overall, and fourth in the GT category. At Donington Park, he partnered Fred Moss, and finished fifth. Having missed the next race, held at Silverstone, he and Moss took eighth at Brands Hatch, and another fifth at Donington Park. The team retired after 17 laps in the second Silverstone race of the season, missed the Snetterton round, and retired once more from the Spa-Francorchamps round, having completed six laps. Although initially listed as entering the season finale, held at Silverstone, he did not compete, and was replaced by Michael Pickup. He finished 22nd in the GT category Driver's Championship, with 24 points; three behind David Leslie in 21st, and seven ahead of Charlie Cox in 23rd.

=== 2001 ===
For 2001, Babikan returned to the Porsche Cup GB. At the opening race of the season, held at Silverstone, he finished sixth in the sprint race, driving a Class 1 Porsche 911 GT3 Supercup, and fifth in the feature race. In the second round, held at Snetterton, he took sixth in both races, which was followed by a fifth and a third in the next round, held at Donington Park. He followed this with a third-place position in the next race at Oulton Park. At Croft, he was replaced by Paul Mace, and he did not enter the sixth round of the season, held at Rockingham. He returned for round 7, held at Brands Hatch, now driving a Class 2 Porsche 911 Carrera (993); he finished tenth overall, and third in class in the sprint race, before finishing twelfth overall, and third in class, in the feature race. Round eight, held at Donington Park, yielded two tenth places in the overall standings, with a fifth and third in class, before he made his first appearance in the European Le Mans Series in 2001 at Most, driving for PK Motorsport in a Porsche 996 GT3-R alongside Piers Masarati and Milan Maderyč; the team were disqualified, having finished eighth, for dangerous driving. Although the team entered Babikan in the following round at Vallelunga, he did not actually drive. Following this, he competed in the Brands Hatch round of the British GT Championship, driving a Porsche 911 GT3-R for Harlow Motorsport alongside Neil Cunningham; the pair finished eighth overall, and fourth in the GTO category. Babikan was classified joint-33rd in the GTO category of the British GT Championship, with eight points; level with Cunningham and Ben McLoughlin.
