= Marcos Mantis =

Range of sports cars

The Marcos Mantis is the name of a run of sportscars introduced in 1968 by Marcos Engineering.

== Racing model ==
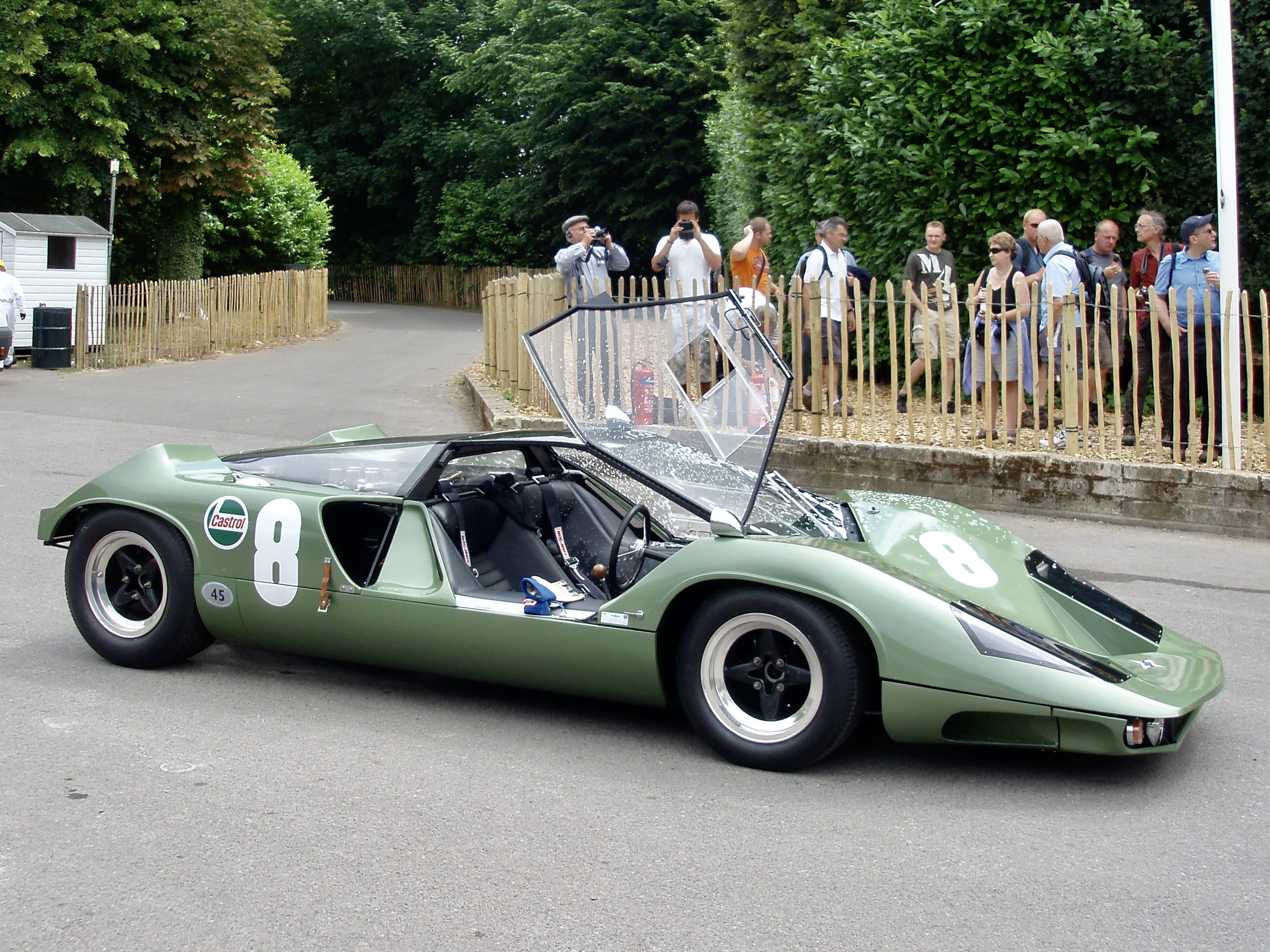
Marcos Mantis XP, Goodwood Festival of Speed 2010

The first Mantis was the Mantis XP, a racing car designed for the Group 6 Prototype category. It was powered by a mid-mounted Repco V8 engine. Like earlier Marcos cars it used a plywood monocoque chassis, albeit different from that of the GT. Only one car was made, and its only race was the 1968 1,000 km event at Spa, where it retired with electrical problems in heavy rain. Originally Marcos intended to race it in the 1968 Le Mans, but that was postponed from June to September, and by then the car was in America, fitted with a Buick V8 engine (from which the Rover V8 engine was derived).

== Road cars ==
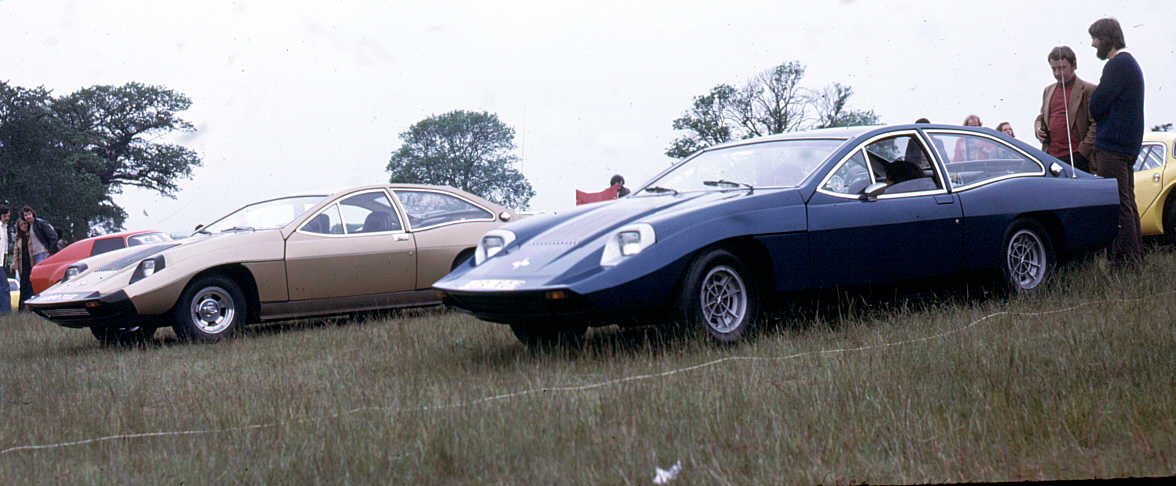
Marcos Mantis M70 (1970 Model)

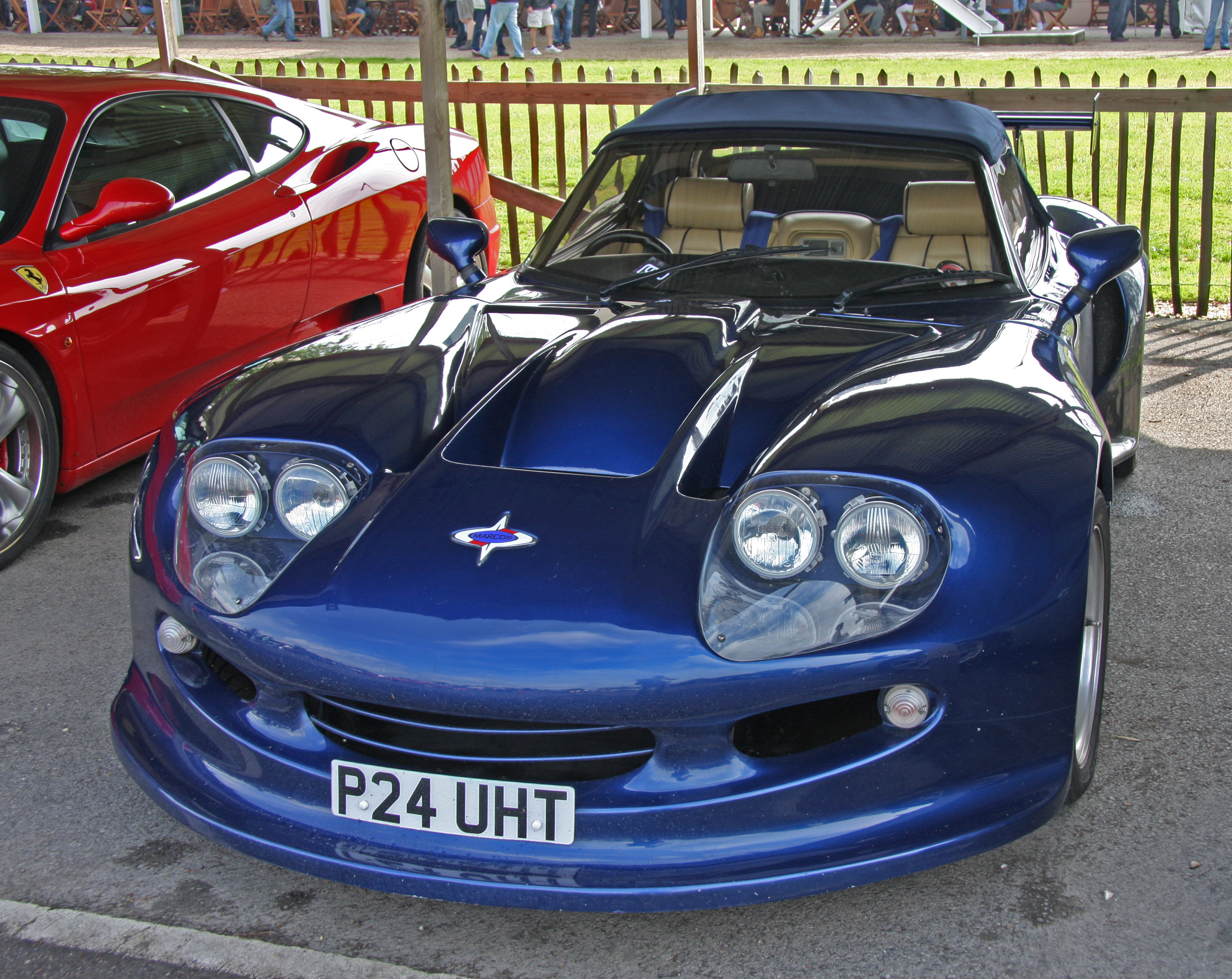
Marcos Mantis GT

The road cars, which followed in 1970, were powered by the same Triumph 2.5 litre 6-cylinder engine used in the Triumph TR6 and by TVR. In February 1971, Marcos announced that the car could also be purchased in component form, at a domestic market price of £425, compared to the recommended retail price of £3,185 for the factory-built version. For comparison, a sporty luxury saloon such as the V8 Rover 3500 would have cost £2,150 including sales taxes. With Marcos encountering financial problems and closing down later in 1971, only 32 examples of the Mantis were produced, although Motor magazine reported that there were another 35 unsold cars in the United States, and possibly other unsold vehicles elsewhere.

== Later history ==
Marcos Mantis Marcorelly race cars, built by Cor Euser Racing. Prescott Hill Climb, 2009

Following the closure of Marcos, Autotune UK acquired the moulds and produced a few more car kits in the mid-1980s, marketing them as "Autotune Mirages".

The Marcos brand was resurrected in 1981, but the Mantis name only appeared again much later in 1997, as a totally new 2-seater vehicle with a 4.6 litre engine. Boasting exceptional performance figures, this was further boosted in 1998 with the Mantis GT adding a supercharger, bringing power output beyond 500bhp. Production of this new version of the Mantis was 51 road-legal cars, with 16 being the supercharged GT version. There were also an additional 38 Mantis Challenge race cars.

In 1995 Dutch racing driver Cor Euser became the factory driver for Marcos, and in 2000, the Marcos racing business was sold to long time GT sponsor Eurotech, a Dutch engineering firm. By that time, all Marcos racing cars and road car chassis were built in the Netherlands. Cor Euser competed as Marcos Racing International, racing various Marcos derived models including a GT-3 spec Mantis, and a further development of the Mantis, the Marcos Mantis Marcorelly.

== Technical details ==
Announced as being officially released for sale in the United Kingdom during October 1970, as a luxurious 2+2, the Mantis M70 boasted a top speed of 120 mph (190 km/h). The suspension consisted of coil springs on all of the four wheel assemblies, as well as a live rear axle suspension with trailing links and an “A” bracket. The Mantis was expected to be marketed to the “younger English executive market”.

With a length of 15 ft 6 in (4.72 m) and a height of 3 ft 10 in (1.17 m), these dimensions made it a lengthy car but also one of the lowest coupes on the market at that time.

The Mantis /ˈmæn.tɪs/ name has been used subsequently for models bearing little similarity to the original model. Introduced in 1997, the Mantis GT is a higher performance version of the Mantis, due to progression in technology. The name Mantis is taken from the mantis insect and is intended to signify the performance of the Mantis' engine, a supercharged 4.6 litre Ford Modular V8, producing 506 hp (377 kW), and 452 lb⋅ft (613 N⋅m) of torque. This allows the Mantis to accelerate from 0–60 mph (0–97 km/h) in 3.7 seconds and to reach a top speed of 179 mph (288 km/h). The car features power-assisted rack and pinion steering. It is equipped with AP vented disc brakes with a diameter of 284 mm (11.2 in) at the front and 240 mm (9.4 in) at the rear.

=== Surviving examples ===
Mantis M70 - There are around 6-7 examples still appearing at various events worldwide; one is Canadian-registered, four or five UK-registered, plus one AutoTune Mirage (last seen in lilac/silver). It is impossible to say exactly how many of these are in full on-the-road running order, and how many arrive on the back of a low-loader.
