= 2006 FIA GT Dijon 500km =

Layout of the Dijon circuit

The 2006 FIA GT Dijon 500 km was the sixth race for the 2006 FIA GT Championship season. It took place on September 3, 2006.

== Official results ==
Class winners in bold. Cars failing to complete 70% of winner's distance marked as Not Classified (NC).

Pos	Class	No	Team	Drivers	Chassis	Tyre	Laps
Pos	Class	No	Team	Drivers	Engine	Tyre	Laps
1	**GT1**	**2**	**(Germany) Vitaphone Racing Team**	**(Italy) Thomas Biagi (United Kingdom) Jamie Davies**	**Maserati MC12 GT1**	P	**132**
1	**GT1**	**2**	**(Germany) Vitaphone Racing Team**	**(Italy) Thomas Biagi (United Kingdom) Jamie Davies**	**Maserati 6.0L V12**	P	**132**
2	GT1	33	(Austria) Race Alliance	(Austria) Karl Wendlinger (Austria) Philipp Peter	Aston Martin DBR9	D	132
2	GT1	33	(Austria) Race Alliance	(Austria) Karl Wendlinger (Austria) Philipp Peter	Aston Martin 6.0L V12	D	132
3	GT1	5	(Germany) Phoenix Racing	(Switzerland) Jean-Denis Délétraz (Italy) Andrea Piccini	Aston Martin DBR9	MI	132
3	GT1	5	(Germany) Phoenix Racing	(Switzerland) Jean-Denis Délétraz (Italy) Andrea Piccini	Aston Martin 6.0L V12	MI	132
4	GT1	9	(Germany) Zakspeed Racing	(Czech Republic) Jaroslav Janiš (Germany) Sascha Bert	Saleen S7-R	MI	132
4	GT1	9	(Germany) Zakspeed Racing	(Czech Republic) Jaroslav Janiš (Germany) Sascha Bert	Ford 7.0L V8	MI	132
5	GT1	1	(Germany) Vitaphone Racing Team	(Germany) Michael Bartels (Italy) Andrea Bertolini	Maserati MC12 GT1	P	132
5	GT1	1	(Germany) Vitaphone Racing Team	(Germany) Michael Bartels (Italy) Andrea Bertolini	Maserati 6.0L V12	P	132
6	GT1	23	(Italy) Aston Martin Racing BMS	(Italy) Christian Pescatori (Italy) Fabio Babini	Aston Martin DBR9	P	132
6	GT1	23	(Italy) Aston Martin Racing BMS	(Italy) Christian Pescatori (Italy) Fabio Babini	Aston Martin 6.0L V12	P	132
7	GT1	24	(Italy) Aston Martin Racing BMS	(Italy) Fabrizio Gollin (Portugal) Miguel Ramos	Aston Martin DBR9	P	131
7	GT1	24	(Italy) Aston Martin Racing BMS	(Italy) Fabrizio Gollin (Portugal) Miguel Ramos	Aston Martin 6.0L V12	P	131
8	GT1	38	(Germany) All-Inkl.com Racing	(France) Christophe Bouchut (Switzerland) Benjamin Leuenberger	Lamborghini Murcielago R-GT	D	127
8	GT1	38	(Germany) All-Inkl.com Racing	(France) Christophe Bouchut (Switzerland) Benjamin Leuenberger	Lamborghini 6.0L V12	D	127
9	**GT2**	**58**	**(Italy) AF Corse**	**(Brazil) Jaime Melo (Italy) Matteo Bobbi**	**Ferrari F430 GT2**	P	**127**
9	**GT2**	**58**	**(Italy) AF Corse**	**(Brazil) Jaime Melo (Italy) Matteo Bobbi**	**Ferrari 4.0L V8**	P	**127**
10	GT2	63	(United Kingdom) Scuderia Ecosse	(United Kingdom) Tim Mullen (Canada) Chris Niarchos	Ferrari F430 GT2	MI	127
10	GT2	63	(United Kingdom) Scuderia Ecosse	(United Kingdom) Tim Mullen (Canada) Chris Niarchos	Ferrari 4.0L V8	MI	127
11	GT2	59	(Italy) AF Corse	(Finland) Mika Salo (Portugal) Rui Águas	Ferrari F430 GT2	P	125
11	GT2	59	(Italy) AF Corse	(Finland) Mika Salo (Portugal) Rui Águas	Ferrari 4.0L V8	P	125
12	GT2	66	(Germany) Team Felbermayr-Proton	(Germany) Christian Reid (Austria) Horst Felbermayr Jr.	Porsche 911 GT3-RSR	MI	123
12	GT2	66	(Germany) Team Felbermayr-Proton	(Germany) Christian Reid (Austria) Horst Felbermayr Jr.	Porsche 3.6L Flat-6	MI	123
13	GT2	74	(Italy) Ebimotors	(Italy) Luigi Moccia (Italy) Emanuele Busnelli	Porsche 911 GT3-RSR	P	123
13	GT2	74	(Italy) Ebimotors	(Italy) Luigi Moccia (Italy) Emanuele Busnelli	Porsche 3.6L Flat-6	P	123
14	GT2	62	(United Kingdom) Scuderia Ecosse	(United Kingdom) Nathan Kinch (United Kingdom) Andrew Kirkaldy	Ferrari F430 GT2	MI	122
14	GT2	62	(United Kingdom) Scuderia Ecosse	(United Kingdom) Nathan Kinch (United Kingdom) Andrew Kirkaldy	Ferrari 4.0L V8	MI	122
15	GT2	77	(Slovakia) Autoracing Club Bratislava	(Slovakia) Miro Konopka (Slovakia) Štefan Rosina	Porsche 911 GT3-RS	D	118
15	GT2	77	(Slovakia) Autoracing Club Bratislava	(Slovakia) Miro Konopka (Slovakia) Štefan Rosina	Porsche 3.6L Flat-6	D	118
16	GT2	69	(Germany) Team Felbermayr-Proton	(Germany) Gerold Reid (Austria) Horst Felbermayr Sr.	Porsche 911 GT3-RS	MI	118
16	GT2	69	(Germany) Team Felbermayr-Proton	(Germany) Gerold Reid (Austria) Horst Felbermayr Sr.	Porsche 3.6L Flat-6	MI	118
17	GT2	56	(Monaco) JMB Racing	(Netherlands) Peter Kutemann (France) Antoine Gosse	Ferrari F430 GT2	P	116
17	GT2	56	(Monaco) JMB Racing	(Netherlands) Peter Kutemann (France) Antoine Gosse	Ferrari 4.0L V8	P	116
18 DNF	G2	101	(Belgium) Belgian Racing	(Belgium) Bas Leinders (Belgium) Renaud Kuppens	Gillet Vertigo Streiff	D	78
18 DNF	G2	101	(Belgium) Belgian Racing	(Belgium) Bas Leinders (Belgium) Renaud Kuppens	Alfa Romeo 3.6L V6	D	78
19 DNF	GT2	75	(Italy) Ebimotors	(France) Emmanuel Collard (Italy) Luca Riccitelli	Porsche 911 GT3-RSR	P	28
19 DNF	GT2	75	(Italy) Ebimotors	(France) Emmanuel Collard (Italy) Luca Riccitelli	Porsche 3.6L Flat-6	P	28
20 DNF	GT2	55	(Monaco) JMB Racing	(United Kingdom) Tim Sugden (Switzerland) Iradj Alexander	Ferrari F430 GT2	P	19
20 DNF	GT2	55	(Monaco) JMB Racing	(United Kingdom) Tim Sugden (Switzerland) Iradj Alexander	Ferrari 4.0L V8	P	19
21 DNF	GT1	4	(Belgium) GLPK-Carsport	(Netherlands) Mike Hezemans (Belgium) Bert Longin (Belgium) Anthony Kumpen	Chevrolet Corvette C6.R	MI	13
21 DNF	GT1	4	(Belgium) GLPK-Carsport	(Netherlands) Mike Hezemans (Belgium) Bert Longin (Belgium) Anthony Kumpen	Chevrolet 7.0L V8	MI	13
22 DNF	GT1	11	(United Kingdom) Balfe Motorsport	(United Kingdom) Shaun Balfe (United Kingdom) Nigel Taylor	Saleen S7-R	D	11
22 DNF	GT1	11	(United Kingdom) Balfe Motorsport	(United Kingdom) Shaun Balfe (United Kingdom) Nigel Taylor	Ford 7.0L V8	D	11

== Statistics ==
- Pole Position – #9 Zakspeed Racing – 1:14.623
- Average Speed – 171.80 km/h

FIA GT Championship
Previous race: 2006 FIA GT Paul Ricard 500km	2006 season	Next race: 2006 FIA GT Mugello 500km
