= 2006 FIA GT Budapest 500km =

Layout of the Hungaroring

The 2006 FIA GT Budapest 500 km was the eighth race for the 2006 FIA GT Championship season. It took place on September 30, 2006, being run at the Hungaroring.

== Official results ==
Class winners in bold. Cars failing to complete 70% of winner's distance marked as Not Classified (NC).

Pos	Class	No	Team	Drivers	Chassis	Tyre	Laps
Pos	Class	No	Team	Drivers	Engine	Tyre	Laps
1	**GT1**	**9**	**(Germany) Zakspeed Racing**	**(Czech Republic) Jaroslav Janiš (Germany) Sascha Bert (Italy) Andrea Montermini**	**Saleen S7-R**	MI	**102**
1	**GT1**	**9**	**(Germany) Zakspeed Racing**	**(Czech Republic) Jaroslav Janiš (Germany) Sascha Bert (Italy) Andrea Montermini**	**Ford 7.0L V8**	MI	**102**
2	GT1	4	(Belgium) GLPK-Carsport	(Netherlands) Mike Hezemans (Belgium) Bert Longin (Belgium) Anthony Kumpen	Chevrolet Corvette C6.R	MI	102
2	GT1	4	(Belgium) GLPK-Carsport	(Netherlands) Mike Hezemans (Belgium) Bert Longin (Belgium) Anthony Kumpen	Chevrolet 7.0L V8	MI	102
3	GT1	23	(Italy) Aston Martin Racing BMS	(Italy) Fabio Babini (Italy) Matteo Malucelli	Aston Martin DBR9	P	102
3	GT1	23	(Italy) Aston Martin Racing BMS	(Italy) Fabio Babini (Italy) Matteo Malucelli	Aston Martin 6.0L V12	P	102
4	GT1	5	(Germany) Phoenix Racing	(Switzerland) Jean-Denis Délétraz (Italy) Andrea Piccini	Aston Martin DBR9	MI	102
4	GT1	5	(Germany) Phoenix Racing	(Switzerland) Jean-Denis Délétraz (Italy) Andrea Piccini	Aston Martin 6.0L V12	MI	102
5	GT1	1	(Germany) Vitaphone Racing Team	(Germany) Michael Bartels (Italy) Andrea Bertolini	Maserati MC12 GT1	P	102
5	GT1	1	(Germany) Vitaphone Racing Team	(Germany) Michael Bartels (Italy) Andrea Bertolini	Maserati 6.0L V12	P	102
6	GT1	24	(Italy) Aston Martin Racing BMS	(Italy) Fabrizio Gollin (Portugal) Miguel Ramos	Aston Martin DBR9	P	102
6	GT1	24	(Italy) Aston Martin Racing BMS	(Italy) Fabrizio Gollin (Portugal) Miguel Ramos	Aston Martin 6.0L V12	P	102
7	GT1	2	(Germany) Vitaphone Racing Team	(Italy) Thomas Biagi (United Kingdom) Jamie Davies	Maserati MC12 GT1	P	101
7	GT1	2	(Germany) Vitaphone Racing Team	(Italy) Thomas Biagi (United Kingdom) Jamie Davies	Maserati 6.0L V12	P	101
8	GT1	38	(Germany) All-Inkl.com Racing	(France) Christophe Bouchut (Switzerland) Benjamin Leuenberger (Netherlands) Peter Kox	Lamborghini Murcielago R-GT	D	100
8	GT1	38	(Germany) All-Inkl.com Racing	(France) Christophe Bouchut (Switzerland) Benjamin Leuenberger (Netherlands) Peter Kox	Lamborghini 6.0L V12	D	100
9	GT1	11	(United Kingdom) Balfe Motorsport	(United Kingdom) Shaun Balfe (Portugal) João Barbosa	Saleen S7-R	D	99
9	GT1	11	(United Kingdom) Balfe Motorsport	(United Kingdom) Shaun Balfe (Portugal) João Barbosa	Ford 7.0L V8	D	99
10	**GT2**	**62**	**(United Kingdom) Scuderia Ecosse**	**(United Kingdom) Nathan Kinch (United Kingdom) Andrew Kirkaldy**	**Ferrari F430 GT2**	MI	**98**
10	**GT2**	**62**	**(United Kingdom) Scuderia Ecosse**	**(United Kingdom) Nathan Kinch (United Kingdom) Andrew Kirkaldy**	**Ferrari 4.0L V8**	MI	**98**
11	GT2	58	(Italy) AF Corse	(Brazil) Jaime Melo (Italy) Matteo Bobbi	Ferrari F430 GT2	P	97
11	GT2	58	(Italy) AF Corse	(Brazil) Jaime Melo (Italy) Matteo Bobbi	Ferrari 4.0L V8	P	97
12	GT2	63	(United Kingdom) Scuderia Ecosse	(United Kingdom) Tim Mullen (Canada) Chris Niarchos	Ferrari F430 GT2	MI	97
12	GT2	63	(United Kingdom) Scuderia Ecosse	(United Kingdom) Tim Mullen (Canada) Chris Niarchos	Ferrari 4.0L V8	MI	97
13	GT2	55	(Monaco) JMB Racing	(United Kingdom) Tim Sugden (Switzerland) Iradj Alexander	Ferrari F430 GT2	P	97
13	GT2	55	(Monaco) JMB Racing	(United Kingdom) Tim Sugden (Switzerland) Iradj Alexander	Ferrari 4.0L V8	P	97
14	GT2	59	(Italy) AF Corse	(Finland) Mika Salo (Portugal) Rui Águas	Ferrari F430 GT2	P	96
14	GT2	59	(Italy) AF Corse	(Finland) Mika Salo (Portugal) Rui Águas	Ferrari 4.0L V8	P	96
15	GT2	66	(Germany) Team Felbermayr-Proton	(Germany) Christian Ried (Austria) Horst Felbermayr Jr.	Porsche 911 GT3-RS	MI	95
15	GT2	66	(Germany) Team Felbermayr-Proton	(Germany) Christian Ried (Austria) Horst Felbermayr Jr.	Porsche 3.6L Flat-6	MI	95
16	GT2	75	(Italy) Ebimotors	(Italy) Luca Riccitelli (Germany) Uwe Alzen	Porsche 911 GT3-RSR	P	94
16	GT2	75	(Italy) Ebimotors	(Italy) Luca Riccitelli (Germany) Uwe Alzen	Porsche 3.6L Flat-6	P	94
17	GT2	74	(Italy) Ebimotors	(Italy) Luigi Moccia (Italy) Emanuele Busnelli	Porsche 911 GT3-RSR	P	94
17	GT2	74	(Italy) Ebimotors	(Italy) Luigi Moccia (Italy) Emanuele Busnelli	Porsche 3.6L Flat-6	P	94
18	GT2	56	(Monaco) JMB Racing	(Netherlands) Peter Kutemann (France) Stéphane Daoudi	Ferrari F430 GT2	P	94
18	GT2	56	(Monaco) JMB Racing	(Netherlands) Peter Kutemann (France) Stéphane Daoudi	Ferrari 4.0L V8	P	94
19	**G3**	**133**	**(Italy) BMS Scuderia Italia**	**(Italy) Franco Groppi (Switzerland) Toni Seiler**	**Aston Martin DBRS9**	MI	**92**
19	**G3**	**133**	**(Italy) BMS Scuderia Italia**	**(Italy) Franco Groppi (Switzerland) Toni Seiler**	**Aston Martin 6.0L V12**	MI	**92**
20	G3	115	(Italy) BMS Scuderia Italia	(Russia) Sergei Zlobin (Italy) Davide Stancheris	Aston Martin DBRS9	MI	92
20	G3	115	(Italy) BMS Scuderia Italia	(Russia) Sergei Zlobin (Italy) Davide Stancheris	Aston Martin 6.0L V12	MI	92
21	GT2	99	(Austria) Race Alliance	(Austria) Thomas Gruber (Austria) Lukas Lichtner-Hoyer	Porsche 911 GT3-RSR	D	92
21	GT2	99	(Austria) Race Alliance	(Austria) Thomas Gruber (Austria) Lukas Lichtner-Hoyer	Porsche 3.6L Flat-6	D	92
22	GT2	69	(Germany) Team Felbermayr-Proton	(Germany) Gerold Ried (Austria) Horst Felbermayr Sr.	Porsche 911 GT3-RS	MI	91
22	GT2	69	(Germany) Team Felbermayr-Proton	(Germany) Gerold Ried (Austria) Horst Felbermayr Sr.	Porsche 3.6L Flat-6	MI	91
23	GT2	52	(Austria) Renauer Motorsport Team	(Hungary) László Palik (Hungary) Zoltán Zengő	Porsche 911 GT3-RSR	D	89
23	GT2	52	(Austria) Renauer Motorsport Team	(Hungary) László Palik (Hungary) Zoltán Zengő	Porsche 3.6L Flat-6	D	89
24 DNF	GT2	77	(Slovakia) Autoracing Club Bratislava	(Slovakia) Miro Konopka (Slovakia) Štefan Rosina	Porsche 911 GT3-RS	D	65
24 DNF	GT2	77	(Slovakia) Autoracing Club Bratislava	(Slovakia) Miro Konopka (Slovakia) Štefan Rosina	Porsche 3.6L Flat-6	D	65
25 DNF	GT1	33	(Austria) Race Alliance	(Austria) Karl Wendlinger (Austria) Philipp Peter	Aston Martin DBR9	D	63
25 DNF	GT1	33	(Austria) Race Alliance	(Austria) Karl Wendlinger (Austria) Philipp Peter	Aston Martin 6.0L V12	D	63

== Statistics ==
- Pole Position – #9 Zakspeed Racing – 1:42.034
- Average Speed – 147.6 km/h

FIA GT Championship
Previous race: 2006 FIA GT Mugello 500km	2006 season	Next race: 2006 FIA GT Adria 500km
