= 2006 FIA GT Adria 500km =

Layout of the Adria International Raceway

The 2006 FIA GT Adria Supercar 500 was the penultimate race for the 2006 FIA GT Championship season. It took place on October 15, 2006.

== Official results ==
Class winners in bold. Cars failing to complete 70% of winner's distance marked as Not Classified (NC).

| Pos | Class | No | Team | Drivers | Chassis | Tyre | Laps |
| Pos | Class | No | Team | Drivers | Engine | Tyre | Laps |
|---|---|---|---|---|---|---|---|
| 1 | **GT1** | **2** | **(Germany) Vitaphone Racing Team** | **(Italy) Thomas Biagi (United Kingdom) Jamie Davies** | **Maserati MC12 GT1** | P | **144** |
| 1 | **GT1** | **2** | **(Germany) Vitaphone Racing Team** | **(Italy) Thomas Biagi (United Kingdom) Jamie Davies** | **Maserati 6.0L V12** | P | **144** |
| 2 | GT1 | 1 | (Germany) Vitaphone Racing Team | (Germany) Michael Bartels (Italy) Andrea Bertolini | Maserati MC12 | P | 144 |
| 2 | GT1 | 1 | (Germany) Vitaphone Racing Team | (Germany) Michael Bartels (Italy) Andrea Bertolini | Maserati 6.0L V12 | P | 144 |
| 3 | GT1 | 4 | (Belgium) GLPK-Carsport | (Netherlands) Mike Hezemans (Belgium) Bert Longin (Belgium) Anthony Kumpen | Chevrolet Corvette C6.R | MI | 144 |
| 3 | GT1 | 4 | (Belgium) GLPK-Carsport | (Netherlands) Mike Hezemans (Belgium) Bert Longin (Belgium) Anthony Kumpen | Chevrolet 7.0L V8 | MI | 144 |
| 4 | GT1 | 23 | (Italy) Aston Martin Racing BMS | (Italy) Fabio Babini (Italy) Christian Pescatori | Aston Martin DBR9 | P | 144 |
| 4 | GT1 | 23 | (Italy) Aston Martin Racing BMS | (Italy) Fabio Babini (Italy) Christian Pescatori | Aston Martin 6.0L V12 | P | 144 |
| 5 | GT1 | 24 | (Italy) Aston Martin Racing BMS | (Italy) Fabrizio Gollin (Portugal) Miguel Ramos | Aston Martin DBR9 | P | 143 |
| 5 | GT1 | 24 | (Italy) Aston Martin Racing BMS | (Italy) Fabrizio Gollin (Portugal) Miguel Ramos | Aston Martin 6.0L V12 | P | 143 |
| 6 | **GT2** | **63** | **(United Kingdom) Scuderia Ecosse** | **(United Kingdom) Tim Mullen (United Kingdom) Marino Franchitti** | **Ferrari F430 GT2** | MI | **139** |
| 6 | **GT2** | **63** | **(United Kingdom) Scuderia Ecosse** | **(United Kingdom) Tim Mullen (United Kingdom) Marino Franchitti** | **Ferrari 4.0L V8** | MI | **139** |
| 7 | GT2 | 82 | (Italy) Edil Cris Racing Team | (Italy) Paolo Ruberti (Italy) Raffaele Giammaria | Ferrari F430 GT2 | MI | 139 |
| 7 | GT2 | 82 | (Italy) Edil Cris Racing Team | (Italy) Paolo Ruberti (Italy) Raffaele Giammaria | Ferrari 4.0L V8 | MI | 139 |
| 8 | GT2 | 55 | (Monaco) JMB Racing | (United Kingdom) Tim Sugden (Switzerland) Iradj Alexander | Ferrari F430 GT2 | P | 139 |
| 8 | GT2 | 55 | (Monaco) JMB Racing | (United Kingdom) Tim Sugden (Switzerland) Iradj Alexander | Ferrari 4.0L V8 | P | 139 |
| 9 | GT2 | 74 | (Italy) Ebimotors | (Italy) Luigi Moccia (Italy) Emuanuele Busnelli | Porsche 911 GT3-RSR | P | 136 |
| 9 | GT2 | 74 | (Italy) Ebimotors | (Italy) Luigi Moccia (Italy) Emuanuele Busnelli | Porsche 3.6L Flat-6 | P | 136 |
| 10 | **G2** | **101** | **(Belgium) Belgian Racing** | **(Belgium) Bas Leinders (Belgium) Renaud Kuppens** | **Gillet Vertigo Streiff** | D | **128** |
| 10 | **G2** | **101** | **(Belgium) Belgian Racing** | **(Belgium) Bas Leinders (Belgium) Renaud Kuppens** | **Alfa Romeo 3.6L V6** | D | **128** |
| 11 | GT1 | 9 | (Germany) Zakspeed Racing | (Czech Republic) Jaroslav Janiš (Germany) Sascha Bert (Italy) Andrea Montermini | Saleen S7-R | MI | 128 |
| 11 | GT1 | 9 | (Germany) Zakspeed Racing | (Czech Republic) Jaroslav Janiš (Germany) Sascha Bert (Italy) Andrea Montermini | Ford 7.0L V8 | MI | 128 |
| 12 | GT2 | 58 | (Italy) AF Corse | (Brazil) Jaime Melo (Italy) Matteo Bobbi | Ferrari F430 GT2 | P | 118 |
| 12 | GT2 | 58 | (Italy) AF Corse | (Brazil) Jaime Melo (Italy) Matteo Bobbi | Ferrari 4.0L V8 | P | 118 |
| 13 DSQ^{†} | GT2 | 59 | (Italy) AF Corse | (Finland) Mika Salo (Portugal) Rui Águas | Ferrari F430 GT2 | P | 136 |
| 13 DSQ^{†} | GT2 | 59 | (Italy) AF Corse | (Finland) Mika Salo (Portugal) Rui Águas | Ferrari 4.0L V8 | P | 136 |
| 14 DNF | GT2 | 69 | (Germany) Team Felbermayr-Proton | (Germany) Gerold Ried (Austria) Horst Felbermayr Sr. | Porsche 911 GT3-RS | MI | 65 |
| 14 DNF | GT2 | 69 | (Germany) Team Felbermayr-Proton | (Germany) Gerold Ried (Austria) Horst Felbermayr Sr. | Porsche 3.6L Flat-6 | MI | 65 |
| 15 DNF | GT1 | 33 | (Austria) Race Alliance | (Austria) Karl Wendlinger (Austria) Philipp Peter | Aston Martin DBR9 | D | 61 |
| 15 DNF | GT1 | 33 | (Austria) Race Alliance | (Austria) Karl Wendlinger (Austria) Philipp Peter | Aston Martin 6.0L V12 | D | 61 |
| 16 DNF | GT1 | 38 | (Germany) All-Inkl.com Racing | (France) Christophe Bouchut (Netherlands) Peter Kox | Lamborghini Murcielago R-GT | D | 46 |
| 16 DNF | GT1 | 38 | (Germany) All-Inkl.com Racing | (France) Christophe Bouchut (Netherlands) Peter Kox | Lamborghini 6.0L V12 | D | 46 |
| 17 DNF | GT1 | 5 | (Germany) Phoenix Racing | (Italy) Andrea Piccini (Switzerland) Jean-Denis Délétraz | Aston Martin DBR9 | MI | 35 |
| 17 DNF | GT1 | 5 | (Germany) Phoenix Racing | (Italy) Andrea Piccini (Switzerland) Jean-Denis Délétraz | Aston Martin 6.0L V12 | MI | 35 |
| 18 DNF | GT2 | 66 | (Germany) Team Felbermayr-Proton | (Germany) Christian Ried (Austria) Horst Felbermayr Jr. | Porsche 911 GT3-RSR | MI | 31 |
| 18 DNF | GT2 | 66 | (Germany) Team Felbermayr-Proton | (Germany) Christian Ried (Austria) Horst Felbermayr Jr. | Porsche 3.6L Flat-6 | MI | 31 |
| 19 DNF | GT2 | 62 | (United Kingdom) Scuderia Ecosse | (United Kingdom) Nathan Kinch (United Kingdom) Andrew Kirkaldy | Ferrari F430 GT2 | MI | 30 |
| 19 DNF | GT2 | 62 | (United Kingdom) Scuderia Ecosse | (United Kingdom) Nathan Kinch (United Kingdom) Andrew Kirkaldy | Ferrari 4.0L V8 | MI | 30 |
| 20 DNF | GT2 | 75 | (Italy) Ebimotors | (France) Emmanuel Collard (Italy) Luca Riccitelli | Porsche 911 GT3-RSR | P | 24 |
| 20 DNF | GT2 | 75 | (Italy) Ebimotors | (France) Emmanuel Collard (Italy) Luca Riccitelli | Porsche 3.6L Flat-6 | P | 24 |

† – Car #59 was disqualified for an illegal ride height in post-race inspection.

== Statistics ==
- Pole Position – #9 Zakspeed Racing – 1:11.304
- Average Speed – 128.93 km/h

FIA GT Championship
| Previous race: 2006 FIA GT Budapest 500km | 2006 season | Next race: 2006 FIA GT Dubai 500km |
