= 2006 FIA GT Tourist Trophy =

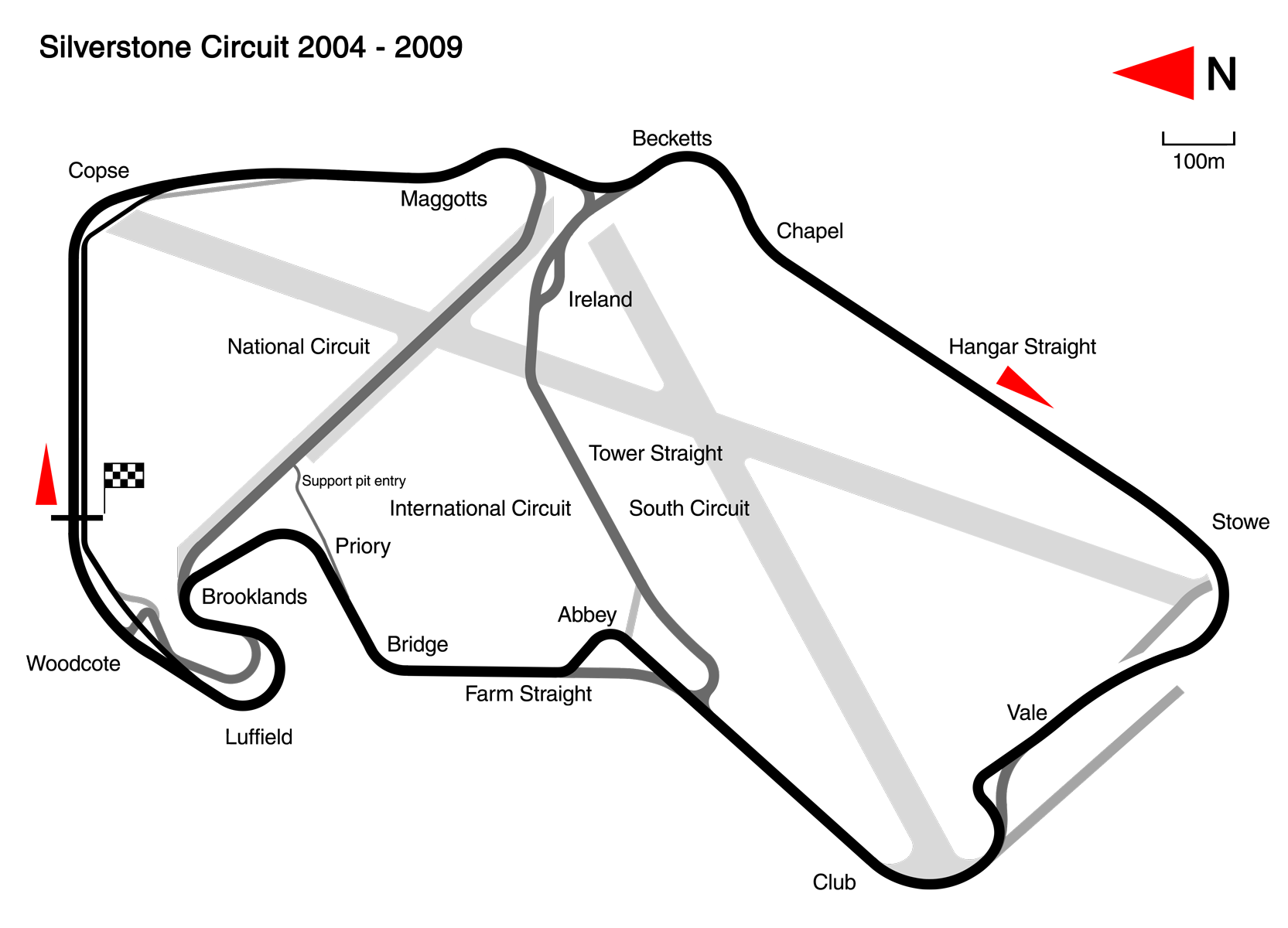
Map of the Silverstone Circuit (2004–2009)

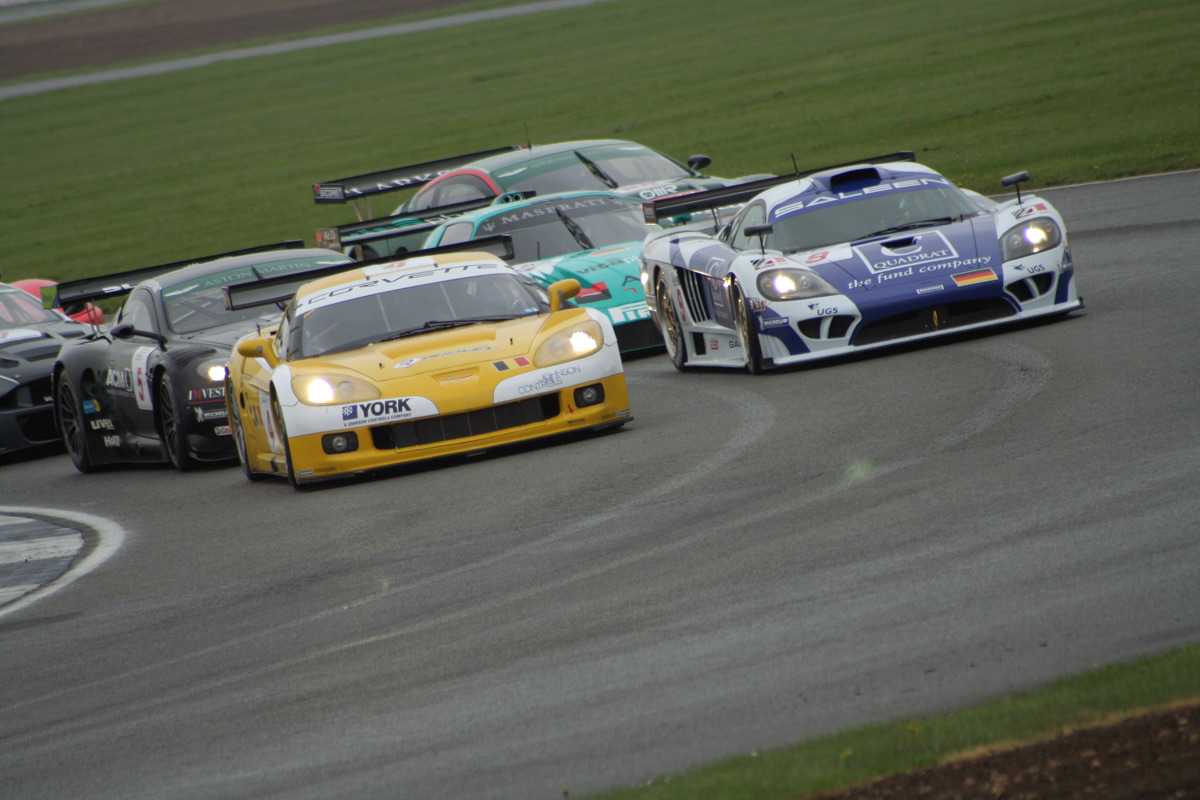
The field just prior to the start.

The 2006 FIA GT RAC Tourist Trophy was the first race for the 2006 FIA GT Championship season. It took place on May 7, 2006, at Silverstone Circuit. It was the second time the RAC Tourist Trophy was held as a round of the FIA GT Championship.

== Official results ==
Class winners in bold. Cars failing to complete 70% of winner's distance marked as Not Classified (NC).

Pos	Class	No	Team	Drivers	Chassis	Tyre	Laps
Pos	Class	No	Team	Drivers	Engine	Tyre	Laps
1	**GT1**	**1**	**(Germany) Vitaphone Racing Team**	**(Italy) Andrea Bertolini (Germany) Michael Bartels**	**Maserati MC12 GT1**	P	**95**
1	**GT1**	**1**	**(Germany) Vitaphone Racing Team**	**(Italy) Andrea Bertolini (Germany) Michael Bartels**	**Maserati 6.0L V12**	P	**95**
2	GT1	9	(Germany) Zakspeed Racing	(Czech Republic) Jaroslav Janiš (Germany) Sascha Bert	Saleen S7-R	MI	95
2	GT1	9	(Germany) Zakspeed Racing	(Czech Republic) Jaroslav Janiš (Germany) Sascha Bert	Ford 7.0L V8	MI	95
3	GT1	23	(Italy) Aston Martin Racing BMS	(Italy) Fabio Babini (Italy) Fabrizio Gollin	Aston Martin DBR9	P	95
3	GT1	23	(Italy) Aston Martin Racing BMS	(Italy) Fabio Babini (Italy) Fabrizio Gollin	Aston Martin 6.0L V12	P	95
4	GT1	7	(United Kingdom) Cirtek Motorsport (United Kingdom) Team Modena	(France) Christophe Bouchut (Australia) David Brabham	Aston Martin DBR9	MI	95
4	GT1	7	(United Kingdom) Cirtek Motorsport (United Kingdom) Team Modena	(France) Christophe Bouchut (Australia) David Brabham	Aston Martin 6.0L V12	MI	95
5	GT1	2	(Germany) Vitaphone Racing Team	(Italy) Thomas Biagi (United Kingdom) Jamie Davies	Maserati MC12 GT1	P	95
5	GT1	2	(Germany) Vitaphone Racing Team	(Italy) Thomas Biagi (United Kingdom) Jamie Davies	Maserati 6.0L V12	P	95
6	GT1	5	(Germany) Phoenix Racing	(Italy) Andrea Piccini (Switzerland) Jean-Denis Délétraz	Aston Martin DBR9	MI	94
6	GT1	5	(Germany) Phoenix Racing	(Italy) Andrea Piccini (Switzerland) Jean-Denis Délétraz	Aston Martin 6.0L V12	MI	94
7	GT1	24	(Italy) Aston Martin Racing BMS	(Italy) Christian Pescatori (Portugal) Miguel Ramos	Aston Martin DBR9	P	94
7	GT1	24	(Italy) Aston Martin Racing BMS	(Italy) Christian Pescatori (Portugal) Miguel Ramos	Aston Martin 6.0L V12	P	94
8	GT1	4	(Belgium) GLPK-Carsport	(Netherlands) Mike Hezemans (Belgium) Bert Longin (Belgium) Anthony Kumpen	Chevrolet Corvette C6.R	MI	94
8	GT1	4	(Belgium) GLPK-Carsport	(Netherlands) Mike Hezemans (Belgium) Bert Longin (Belgium) Anthony Kumpen	Chevrolet 7.0L V8	MI	94
9	**GT2**	**58**	**(Italy) AF Corse**	**(Brazil) Jaime Melo (Italy) Matteo Bobbi**	**Ferrari F430 GT2**	P	**91**
9	**GT2**	**58**	**(Italy) AF Corse**	**(Brazil) Jaime Melo (Italy) Matteo Bobbi**	**Ferrari 4.0L V8**	P	**91**
10	GT2	75	(Italy) Ebimotors	(France) Emmanuel Collard (Italy) Luca Riccitelli	Porsche 911 GT3-RSR	P	91
10	GT2	75	(Italy) Ebimotors	(France) Emmanuel Collard (Italy) Luca Riccitelli	Porsche 3.6L Flat-6	P	91
11	GT2	59	(Italy) AF Corse	(Finland) Mika Salo (Portugal) Rui Águas	Ferrari F430 GT2	P	91
11	GT2	59	(Italy) AF Corse	(Finland) Mika Salo (Portugal) Rui Águas	Ferrari 4.0L V8	P	91
12	GT1	11	(United Kingdom) Balfe Motorsport	(United Kingdom) Jamie Derbyshire (United Kingdom) Shaun Balfe (New Zealand) Neil Cunningham	Saleen S7-R	D	89
12	GT1	11	(United Kingdom) Balfe Motorsport	(United Kingdom) Jamie Derbyshire (United Kingdom) Shaun Balfe (New Zealand) Neil Cunningham	Ford 7.0L V8	D	89
13	GT2	66	(Germany) Team Felbermayr-Proton	(Germany) Christian Ried (Austria) Horst Felbermayr Jr.	Porsche 911 GT3-RSR	MI	89
13	GT2	66	(Germany) Team Felbermayr-Proton	(Germany) Christian Ried (Austria) Horst Felbermayr Jr.	Porsche 3.6L Flat-6	MI	89
14	GT2	57	(United Kingdom) Team LNT	(United Kingdom) Lawrence Tomlinson (United Kingdom) Richard Dean	Panoz Esperante GT-LM	P	88
14	GT2	57	(United Kingdom) Team LNT	(United Kingdom) Lawrence Tomlinson (United Kingdom) Richard Dean	Ford (Elan) 5.0L V8	P	88
15	GT2	74	(Italy) Ebimotors	(Italy) Luigi Moccia (Italy) Emanuele Busnelli	Porsche 911 GT3-RSR	P	87
15	GT2	74	(Italy) Ebimotors	(Italy) Luigi Moccia (Italy) Emanuele Busnelli	Porsche 3.6L Flat-6	P	87
16	GT2	52	(Austria) Renauer Motorsport Team	(Germany) Wolfgang Kaufmann (Italy) Luca Moro	Porsche 911 GT3-RSR	D	85
16	GT2	52	(Austria) Renauer Motorsport Team	(Germany) Wolfgang Kaufmann (Italy) Luca Moro	Porsche 3.6L Flat-6	D	85
17	GT2	69	(Germany) Team Felbermayr-Proton	(Germany) Gerold Ried (Austria) Horst Felbermayr Sr.	Porsche 911 GT3-RSR	MI	85
17	GT2	69	(Germany) Team Felbermayr-Proton	(Germany) Gerold Ried (Austria) Horst Felbermayr Sr.	Porsche 3.6L Flat-6	MI	85
18	GT2	99	(Austria) Race Alliance	(Austria) Lukas Lichtner-Hoyer (Austria) Thomas Gruber	Porsche 911 GT3-RSR	D	84
18	GT2	99	(Austria) Race Alliance	(Austria) Lukas Lichtner-Hoyer (Austria) Thomas Gruber	Porsche 3.6L Flat-6	D	84
19	GT2	77	(Slovakia) Autoracing Club Bratislava	(Slovakia) Miro Konôpka (Slovakia) Štefan Rosina	Porsche 911 GT3-RS	D	83
19	GT2	77	(Slovakia) Autoracing Club Bratislava	(Slovakia) Miro Konôpka (Slovakia) Štefan Rosina	Porsche 3.6L Flat-6	D	83
20	GT2	56	(Monaco) JMB Racing	(Netherlands) Peter Kutemann (France) Antoine Gosse	Ferrari F430 GT2	P	83
20	GT2	56	(Monaco) JMB Racing	(Netherlands) Peter Kutemann (France) Antoine Gosse	Ferrari 4.0L V8	P	83
21	GT2	53	(Austria) Renauer Motorsport Team	(Austria) Manfred Jurasz (Austria) Hans Knauss (Switzerland) Theo Heutschi	Porsche 911 GT3-RSR	D	82
21	GT2	53	(Austria) Renauer Motorsport Team	(Austria) Manfred Jurasz (Austria) Hans Knauss (Switzerland) Theo Heutschi	Porsche 3.6L Flat-6	D	82
22	GT2	55	(Monaco) JMB Racing	(United Kingdom) Tim Sugden (Switzerland) Iradj Alexander	Ferrari F430 GT2	P	82
22	GT2	55	(Monaco) JMB Racing	(United Kingdom) Tim Sugden (Switzerland) Iradj Alexander	Ferrari 4.0L V8	P	82
23 DNF	GT1	33	(Austria) Race Alliance	(Austria) Karl Wendlinger (Austria) Philipp Peter	Aston Martin DBR9	D	54
23 DNF	GT1	33	(Austria) Race Alliance	(Austria) Karl Wendlinger (Austria) Philipp Peter	Aston Martin 6.0L V12	D	54
24 DNF	GT1	13	(Germany) B-Racing RS Line Team	(Switzerland) Benjamin Leuenberger (Austria) Norbert Walchhofer (United Kingdom) Marino Franchitti	Lamborghini Murcielago R-GT	D	39
24 DNF	GT1	13	(Germany) B-Racing RS Line Team	(Switzerland) Benjamin Leuenberger (Austria) Norbert Walchhofer (United Kingdom) Marino Franchitti	Lamborghini 6.0L V12	D	39
25 DNF	G2	101	(Belgium) Belgian Racing	(Belgium) Bas Leinders (Belgium) Renaud Kuppens	Gillet Vertigo Streiff	D	30
25 DNF	G2	101	(Belgium) Belgian Racing	(Belgium) Bas Leinders (Belgium) Renaud Kuppens	Alfa Romeo 3.6L V6	D	30
26 DNF	GT2	63	(United Kingdom) Scuderia Ecosse	(United Kingdom) Tim Mullen (Canada) Chris Niarchos	Ferrari F430 GT2	MI	26
26 DNF	GT2	63	(United Kingdom) Scuderia Ecosse	(United Kingdom) Tim Mullen (Canada) Chris Niarchos	Ferrari 4.0L V8	MI	26
27 DNF	GT2	60	(United Kingdom) RJN Motorsport	(United Kingdom) Darren Manning (United Kingdom) Joe Turkey	Nissan 350Z GT2	D	23
27 DNF	GT2	60	(United Kingdom) RJN Motorsport	(United Kingdom) Darren Manning (United Kingdom) Joe Turkey	Nissan VQ35 3.5L V6	D	23
28 DNF	GT2	62	(United Kingdom) Scuderia Ecosse	(United Kingdom) Nathan Kinch (United Kingdom) Andrew Kirkaldy	Ferrari F430 GT2	MI	8
28 DNF	GT2	62	(United Kingdom) Scuderia Ecosse	(United Kingdom) Nathan Kinch (United Kingdom) Andrew Kirkaldy	Ferrari 4.0L V8	MI	8
29 DNF	GT1	32	(Austria) Race Alliance	(Austria) Robert Lechner (Germany) Frank Diefenbacher	Aston Martin DBR9	D	0
29 DNF	GT1	32	(Austria) Race Alliance	(Austria) Robert Lechner (Germany) Frank Diefenbacher	Aston Martin 6.0L V12	D	0

== Statistics ==
- Pole Position – #4 GLPK-Carsport – 1:58.288
- Average Speed – 162.23 km/h

FIA GT Championship
Previous race: None	2006 season	Next race: 2006 FIA GT Brno 500km
