= 2006 FIA GT Championship =

Motor racing season

Seasons
- ← 2005 2007 →

The 2006 FIA GT Championship season is the 10th season of FIA GT Championship. It is a series for Grand Touring style cars broken into two classes based on power and manufacturer involvement, called GT1 and GT2. Invitational G2 and G3 classes are also allowed to participate, but do not count towards the championships. It began on 7 May 2006 and ended on the 18 November 2006 after 10 races.

== Schedule ==
Rnd	Race	Circuit	Date
1	(United Kingdom) RAC Tourist Trophy	Silverstone Circuit	7 May
2	(Czech Republic) Brno Supercar 500	Autodrom Brno Masaryk	28 May
3	(Germany) Oschersleben Supercar 500	Motorsport Arena Oschersleben	2 July
4	(Belgium) Proximus Spa 24 Hours	Circuit de Spa-Francorchamps	29 July; 30 July
5	(France) Paul Ricard Supercar 500	Paul Ricard HTTT	20 August
6	(France) Dijon Supercar 500	Dijon-Prenois	3 September
7	(Italy) Mugello Supercar 500	Mugello Circuit	17 September
8	(Hungary) Budapest Supercar 500	Hungaroring	30 September
9	(Italy) Adria Supercar 500	Adria International Raceway	15 October
10	(United Arab Emirates) Motorcity GT 500	Dubai Autodrome	18 November

== Entries ==
=== GT1 ===
Entrant	Car	Engine	Tyre	No.	Drivers	Rounds
(Germany) Vitaphone Racing Team	Maserati MC12 GT1	Maserati 6.0 L V12	P	1	(Germany) Michael Bartels	All
(Germany) Vitaphone Racing Team	Maserati MC12 GT1	Maserati 6.0 L V12	P	1	(Italy) Andrea Bertolini	All
(Germany) Vitaphone Racing Team	Maserati MC12 GT1	Maserati 6.0 L V12	P	1	(Belgium) Eric van de Poele	4, 10
(Germany) Vitaphone Racing Team	Maserati MC12 GT1	Maserati 6.0 L V12	P	2	(Italy) Thomas Biagi	All
(Germany) Vitaphone Racing Team	Maserati MC12 GT1	Maserati 6.0 L V12	P	2	(United Kingdom) Jamie Davies	All
(Germany) Vitaphone Racing Team	Maserati MC12 GT1	Maserati 6.0 L V12	P	2	(Belgium) Vincent Vosse	4, 10
(Belgium) GLPK-Carsport	Chevrolet Corvette C6.R	Chevrolet LS7.R 7.0 L V8	M	4	(Belgium) Anthony Kumpen	All
(Belgium) GLPK-Carsport	Chevrolet Corvette C6.R	Chevrolet LS7.R 7.0 L V8	M	4	(Belgium) Bert Longin	All
(Belgium) GLPK-Carsport	Chevrolet Corvette C6.R	Chevrolet LS7.R 7.0 L V8	M	4	(Netherlands) Mike Hezemans	All
(Belgium) GLPK-Carsport	Chevrolet Corvette C6.R	Chevrolet LS7.R 7.0 L V8	M	4	(Belgium) Kurt Mollekens	4
(Germany) Phoenix Racing	Aston Martin DBR9	Aston Martin 6.0 L V12	M	5	(Italy) Andrea Piccini	All
(Germany) Phoenix Racing	Aston Martin DBR9	Aston Martin 6.0 L V12	M	5	(Switzerland) Jean-Denis Délétraz	All
(Germany) Phoenix Racing	Aston Martin DBR9	Aston Martin 6.0 L V12	M	5	(Switzerland) Marcel Fässler	4
(Germany) Phoenix Racing	Aston Martin DBR9	Aston Martin 6.0 L V12	M	5	(Belgium) Stéphane Lémeret	4
(United Kingdom) Cirtek Motorsport	Aston Martin DBR9	Aston Martin 6.0 L V12	M	7	(Australia) David Brabham	1
(United Kingdom) Cirtek Motorsport	Aston Martin DBR9	Aston Martin 6.0 L V12	M	7	(France) Christophe Bouchut	1
(Germany) Zakspeed Racing	Saleen S7-R	Ford 6.9 L V8	M	9	(Germany) Sascha Bert	All
(Germany) Zakspeed Racing	Saleen S7-R	Ford 6.9 L V8	M	9	(Czech Republic) Jaroslav Janiš	1–4, 6–9
(Germany) Zakspeed Racing	Saleen S7-R	Ford 6.9 L V8	M	9	(Italy) Andrea Montermini	4–5, 7–8
(Germany) Zakspeed Racing	Saleen S7-R	Ford 6.9 L V8	M	9	(Czech Republic) Jan Charouz	4
(Germany) Zakspeed Racing	Saleen S7-R	Ford 6.9 L V8	M	9	(Netherlands) Jos Menten	10
(United Kingdom) Balfe Motorsport	Saleen S7-R	Ford 6.9 L V8	D	11	(United Kingdom) Shaun Balfe	1–3, 5–8
(United Kingdom) Balfe Motorsport	Saleen S7-R	Ford 6.9 L V8	D	11	(United Kingdom) Jamie Derbyshire	1–3
(United Kingdom) Balfe Motorsport	Saleen S7-R	Ford 6.9 L V8	D	11	(New Zealand) Neil Cunningham	1
(United Kingdom) Balfe Motorsport	Saleen S7-R	Ford 6.9 L V8	D	11	(United Kingdom) Nigel Taylor	5–7
(United Kingdom) Balfe Motorsport	Saleen S7-R	Ford 6.9 L V8	D	11	(Portugal) João Barbosa	8
(Germany) B-Racing RS Line Team	Lamborghini Murciélago R-GT	Lamborghini 6.0 L V12	D	13	(United Kingdom) Marino Franchitti	1
(Germany) B-Racing RS Line Team	Lamborghini Murciélago R-GT	Lamborghini 6.0 L V12	D	13	(Switzerland) Benjamin Leuenberger	1
(Germany) B-Racing RS Line Team	Lamborghini Murciélago R-GT	Lamborghini 6.0 L V12	D	13	(Austria) Norbert Walchhofer	1
(Germany) B-Racing RS Line Team	Lamborghini Murciélago R-GT	Lamborghini 6.0 L V12	D	13	(France) Christophe Bouchut	2–3
(Germany) B-Racing RS Line Team	Lamborghini Murciélago R-GT	Lamborghini 6.0 L V12	D	13	(Netherlands) Peter Kox	2
(Germany) B-Racing RS Line Team	Lamborghini Murciélago R-GT	Lamborghini 6.0 L V12	D	13	(Italy) Michele Bartyan	3
(Germany) All-Inkl.com Racing	Lamborghini Murciélago R-GT	Lamborghini 6.0 L V12	D	38	(France) Christophe Bouchut	6–9
(Germany) All-Inkl.com Racing	Lamborghini Murciélago R-GT	Lamborghini 6.0 L V12	D	38	(Switzerland) Benjamin Leuenberger	6–7
(Germany) All-Inkl.com Racing	Lamborghini Murciélago R-GT	Lamborghini 6.0 L V12	D	38	(Netherlands) Peter Kox	8–9
(France) Red Racing	Lister Storm GTM	Jaguar 7.0 L V12	D	19	(France) Romain Yvon	5–6
(France) Red Racing	Lister Storm GTM	Jaguar 7.0 L V12	D	19	(France) Olivier Porta	5
(France) Red Racing	Lister Storm GTM	Jaguar 7.0 L V12	D	19	(France) Romain Brandela	6
(Italy) Aston Martin Racing BMS	Aston Martin DBR9	Aston Martin 6.0 L V12	P	23	(Italy) Fabio Babini	All
(Italy) Aston Martin Racing BMS	Aston Martin DBR9	Aston Martin 6.0 L V12	P	23	(Italy) Fabrizio Gollin	1–3, 5
(Italy) Aston Martin Racing BMS	Aston Martin DBR9	Aston Martin 6.0 L V12	P	23	(Italy) Christian Pescatori	4, 6–7, 9
(Italy) Aston Martin Racing BMS	Aston Martin DBR9	Aston Martin 6.0 L V12	P	23	(Netherlands) Peter Kox	4
(Italy) Aston Martin Racing BMS	Aston Martin DBR9	Aston Martin 6.0 L V12	P	23	(Czech Republic) Tomáš Enge	4
(Italy) Aston Martin Racing BMS	Aston Martin DBR9	Aston Martin 6.0 L V12	P	23	(Italy) Matteo Malucelli	8, 10
(Italy) Aston Martin Racing BMS	Aston Martin DBR9	Aston Martin 6.0 L V12	P	24	(Portugal) Miguel Ramos	All
(Italy) Aston Martin Racing BMS	Aston Martin DBR9	Aston Martin 6.0 L V12	P	24	(Italy) Christian Pescatori	1–3, 5
(Italy) Aston Martin Racing BMS	Aston Martin DBR9	Aston Martin 6.0 L V12	P	24	(Italy) Matteo Malucelli	4–5
(Italy) Aston Martin Racing BMS	Aston Martin DBR9	Aston Martin 6.0 L V12	P	24	(Italy) Fabrizio Gollin	4, 6–10
(Italy) Aston Martin Racing BMS	Aston Martin DBR9	Aston Martin 6.0 L V12	P	24	(Italy) Gabriele Lancieri	4
(Austria) Race Alliance Motorsport	Aston Martin DBR9	Aston Martin 6.0 L V12	D M	32	(Austria) Robert Lechner	1
(Austria) Race Alliance Motorsport	Aston Martin DBR9	Aston Martin 6.0 L V12	D M	32	(Germany) Frank Diefenbacher	1
(Austria) Race Alliance Motorsport	Aston Martin DBR9	Aston Martin 6.0 L V12	D M	33	(Austria) Karl Wendlinger	All
(Austria) Race Alliance Motorsport	Aston Martin DBR9	Aston Martin 6.0 L V12	D M	33	(Austria) Philipp Peter	All
(Austria) Race Alliance Motorsport	Aston Martin DBR9	Aston Martin 6.0 L V12	D M	33	(Austria) Robert Lechner	4
(Austria) Race Alliance Motorsport	Aston Martin DBR9	Aston Martin 6.0 L V12	D M	33	(France) Christophe Bouchut	4
(Austria) Race Alliance Motorsport	Aston Martin DBR9	Aston Martin 6.0 L V12	D M	33	(Czech Republic) Jaroslav Janiš	10
(Belgium) PSI Experience	Chevrolet Corvette C6.R	Chevrolet LS7.R 7.0 L V8	D M	34	(Netherlands) Jos Menten	4–5
(Belgium) PSI Experience	Chevrolet Corvette C6.R	Chevrolet LS7.R 7.0 L V8	D M	34	(France) Jean-Philippe Belloc	4–5
(Belgium) PSI Experience	Chevrolet Corvette C6.R	Chevrolet LS7.R 7.0 L V8	D M	34	(France) Patrick Bornhauser	4
(Belgium) PSI Experience	Chevrolet Corvette C6.R	Chevrolet LS7.R 7.0 L V8	D M	34	(Belgium) Fréderic Bouvy	4
(Belgium) PSI Experience	Chevrolet Corvette C5-R	Chevrolet LS7.R 7.0 L V8	D M	36	(Finland) Markus Palttala	4
(Belgium) PSI Experience	Chevrolet Corvette C5-R	Chevrolet LS7.R 7.0 L V8	D M	36	(Finland) Pertti Kuismanen	4
(Belgium) PSI Experience	Chevrolet Corvette C5-R	Chevrolet LS7.R 7.0 L V8	D M	36	(Belgium) Bernard Dehez	4
(Belgium) PSI Experience	Chevrolet Corvette C5-R	Chevrolet LS7.R 7.0 L V8	D M	36	(Belgium) Vincent Radermecker	4
(Belgium) Renstal Excelsior	Chevrolet Corvette C5-R	Chevrolet LS7.R 7.0 L V8	M	35	(Belgium) Maxime Soulet	4
(Belgium) Renstal Excelsior	Chevrolet Corvette C5-R	Chevrolet LS7.R 7.0 L V8	M	35	(Netherlands) David Hart	4
(Belgium) Renstal Excelsior	Chevrolet Corvette C5-R	Chevrolet LS7.R 7.0 L V8	M	35	(Monaco) Geoffroy Horion	4
(Belgium) Renstal Excelsior	Chevrolet Corvette C5-R	Chevrolet LS7.R 7.0 L V8	M	35	(United Kingdom) Chris Buncombe	4
(Italy) Scuderia Playteam	Maserati MC12 GT1	Maserati 6.0 L V12	P	40	(Italy) Giambattista Giannoccaro	7
(Italy) Scuderia Playteam	Maserati MC12 GT1	Maserati 6.0 L V12	P	40	(Italy) Alessandro Pier Guidi	7
(Italy) Scuderia Playteam	Maserati MC12 GT1	Maserati 6.0 L V12	P	40	(Finland) Toni Vilander	7

=== GT2 ===
Entrant	Car	Engine	Tyre	No.	Drivers	Rounds
(Austria) Renauer Motorsport Team	Porsche 911 GT3-RSR	Porsche 3.6 L Flat-6	D	52	(Germany) Wolfgang Kaufmann	1–5
(Austria) Renauer Motorsport Team	Porsche 911 GT3-RSR	Porsche 3.6 L Flat-6	D	52	(Italy) Luca Moro	1–5
(Austria) Renauer Motorsport Team	Porsche 911 GT3-RSR	Porsche 3.6 L Flat-6	D	52	(Austria) Manfred Jurasz	4
(Austria) Renauer Motorsport Team	Porsche 911 GT3-RSR	Porsche 3.6 L Flat-6	D	52	(Hong Kong) Darryl O'Young	4
(Austria) Renauer Motorsport Team	Porsche 911 GT3-RSR	Porsche 3.6 L Flat-6	D	52	(Hungary) László Palik	8
(Austria) Renauer Motorsport Team	Porsche 911 GT3-RSR	Porsche 3.6 L Flat-6	D	52	(Hungary) Zoltán Zengő	8
(Austria) Renauer Motorsport Team	Porsche 911 GT3-RSR	Porsche 3.6 L Flat-6	D	53	(Austria) Manfred Jurasz	1–2
(Austria) Renauer Motorsport Team	Porsche 911 GT3-RSR	Porsche 3.6 L Flat-6	D	53	(Austria) Hans Knauss	1–2
(Austria) Renauer Motorsport Team	Porsche 911 GT3-RSR	Porsche 3.6 L Flat-6	D	53	(Switzerland) Theo Heutschi	1
(Austria) Renauer Motorsport Team	Porsche 911 GT3-RSR	Porsche 3.6 L Flat-6	D	53	(Czech Republic) Pétr Valek	2
(Czech Republic) Vonka Racing	Porsche 911 GT3-R	Porsche 3.6 L Flat-6	P	54	(Czech Republic) Jan Vonka	2
(Czech Republic) Vonka Racing	Porsche 911 GT3-R	Porsche 3.6 L Flat-6	P	54	(Switzerland) Daniel Model	2
(Monaco) JMB Racing	Ferrari F430 GTC	Ferrari 4.3 L V8	P	55	(United Kingdom) Tim Sugden	All
(Monaco) JMB Racing	Ferrari F430 GTC	Ferrari 4.3 L V8	P	55	(Switzerland) Iradj Alexander	All
(Monaco) JMB Racing	Ferrari F430 GTC	Ferrari 4.3 L V8	P	55	(Belgium) Jean-Michel Martin	4
(Monaco) JMB Racing	Ferrari F430 GTC	Ferrari 4.3 L V8	P	55	(France) Stéphane Daoudi	4
(Monaco) JMB Racing	Ferrari F430 GTC	Ferrari 4.3 L V8	P	56	(Netherlands) Peter Kutemann	1–8, 10
(Monaco) JMB Racing	Ferrari F430 GTC	Ferrari 4.3 L V8	P	56	(France) Antoine Gosse	1–7
(Monaco) JMB Racing	Ferrari F430 GTC	Ferrari 4.3 L V8	P	56	(France) Jean-Pierre Malcher	4
(Monaco) JMB Racing	Ferrari F430 GTC	Ferrari 4.3 L V8	P	56	(France) Stéphane Daoudi	8
(Monaco) JMB Racing	Ferrari F430 GTC	Ferrari 4.3 L V8	P	56	(Italy) Andrea Garbagnati	10
(United Kingdom) Team LNT	Panoz Esperante GTLM	Ford 5.0 L V8		57	(United Kingdom) Lawrence Tomlinson	1
(United Kingdom) Team LNT	Panoz Esperante GTLM	Ford 5.0 L V8		57	(United Kingdom) Richard Dean	1
(Italy) AF Corse	Ferrari F430 GTC	Ferrari 4.3 L V8	P	58	(Brazil) Jaime Melo	All
(Italy) AF Corse	Ferrari F430 GTC	Ferrari 4.3 L V8	P	58	(Italy) Matteo Bobbi	1–9
(Italy) AF Corse	Ferrari F430 GTC	Ferrari 4.3 L V8	P	58	(Monaco) Stéphane Ortelli	4
(Italy) AF Corse	Ferrari F430 GTC	Ferrari 4.3 L V8	P	58	(Finland) Toni Vilander	10
(Italy) AF Corse	Ferrari F430 GTC	Ferrari 4.3 L V8	P	59	(Portugal) Rui Águas	All
(Italy) AF Corse	Ferrari F430 GTC	Ferrari 4.3 L V8	P	59	(Finland) Mika Salo	All
(Italy) AF Corse	Ferrari F430 GTC	Ferrari 4.3 L V8	P	59	(Germany) Timo Scheider	4
(United Kingdom) RJN Motorsport	Nissan 350Z	Nissan 3.5 L V6		60	(United Kingdom) Darren Manning	1
(United Kingdom) RJN Motorsport	Nissan 350Z	Nissan 3.5 L V6		60	(United Kingdom) Joe Tuckey	1
(United Kingdom) Scuderia Ecosse	Ferrari F430 GTC	Ferrari 4.3 L V8	M	62	(United Kingdom) Nathan Kinch	All
(United Kingdom) Scuderia Ecosse	Ferrari F430 GTC	Ferrari 4.3 L V8	M	62	(United Kingdom) Andrew Kirkaldy	1–9
(United Kingdom) Scuderia Ecosse	Ferrari F430 GTC	Ferrari 4.3 L V8	M	62	(United Kingdom) Marino Franchitti	4, 10
(United Kingdom) Scuderia Ecosse	Ferrari F430 GTC	Ferrari 4.3 L V8	M	63	(United Kingdom) Tim Mullen	All
(United Kingdom) Scuderia Ecosse	Ferrari F430 GTC	Ferrari 4.3 L V8	M	63	(Canada) Chris Niarchos	1, 3–4, 6–8, 10
(United Kingdom) Scuderia Ecosse	Ferrari F430 GTC	Ferrari 4.3 L V8	M	63	(United Kingdom) Phil Bennett	2
(United Kingdom) Scuderia Ecosse	Ferrari F430 GTC	Ferrari 4.3 L V8	M	63	(Denmark) Allan Simonsen	4
(United Kingdom) Scuderia Ecosse	Ferrari F430 GTC	Ferrari 4.3 L V8	M	63	(United Kingdom) Marino Franchitti	5, 9
(Germany) Team Felbermayr-Proton	Porsche 911 GT3-RS; Porsche 911 GT3-RSR	Porsche 3.6 L Flat-6	M	66	(Germany) Christian Ried	All
(Germany) Team Felbermayr-Proton	Porsche 911 GT3-RS; Porsche 911 GT3-RSR	Porsche 3.6 L Flat-6	M	66	(Austria) Horst Felbermayr Jr.	All
(Germany) Team Felbermayr-Proton	Porsche 911 GT3-RS; Porsche 911 GT3-RSR	Porsche 3.6 L Flat-6	M	66	(Germany) Gerold Ried	4
(Germany) Team Felbermayr-Proton	Porsche 911 GT3-RS; Porsche 911 GT3-RSR	Porsche 3.6 L Flat-6	M	66	(Austria) Horst Felbermayr	4
(Germany) Team Felbermayr-Proton	Porsche 911 GT3-RS; Porsche 911 GT3-RSR	Porsche 3.6 L Flat-6	M	69	(Germany) Gerold Ried	1–3, 5–10
(Germany) Team Felbermayr-Proton	Porsche 911 GT3-RS; Porsche 911 GT3-RSR	Porsche 3.6 L Flat-6	M	69	(Austria) Horst Felbermayr	1–3, 5–10
(Italy) GPC Sport	Ferrari F430 GTC	Ferrari 4.3 L V8	P	70	(Switzerland) Gabriele Gardel	4
(Italy) GPC Sport	Ferrari F430 GTC	Ferrari 4.3 L V8	P	70	(Italy) Marco Cioci	4
(Italy) GPC Sport	Ferrari F430 GTC	Ferrari 4.3 L V8	P	70	(Italy) Luca Drudi	4
(Italy) GPC Sport	Ferrari F430 GTC	Ferrari 4.3 L V8	P	70	(Italy) Fabrizio de Simone	4
(Spain) RSV Motorsport	Ferrari F430 GTC	Ferrari 4.3 L V8	M	71	(Germany) Ronald Severin	4–5
(Spain) RSV Motorsport	Ferrari F430 GTC	Ferrari 4.3 L V8	M	71	(France) Michel Ligonnet	4–5
(Spain) RSV Motorsport	Ferrari F430 GTC	Ferrari 4.3 L V8	M	71	(Spain) Domingo Romero	4
(Spain) RSV Motorsport	Ferrari F430 GTC	Ferrari 4.3 L V8	M	71	(Sweden) Peter Sundberg	4
(Spain) RSV Motorsport	Ferrari F430 GTC	Ferrari 4.3 L V8	M	81	(Spain) Domino Romero	5
(Spain) RSV Motorsport	Ferrari F430 GTC	Ferrari 4.3 L V8	M	81	(Sweden) Peter Sundberg	5
(Italy) AB Motorsport	Porsche 911 GT3-RS	Porsche 3.6 L Flat-6	D	72	(Italy) Antonio De Castro	4
(Italy) AB Motorsport	Porsche 911 GT3-RS	Porsche 3.6 L Flat-6	D	72	(Italy) Bruno Barbaro	4
(Italy) AB Motorsport	Porsche 911 GT3-RS	Porsche 3.6 L Flat-6	D	72	(Italy) Renato Premoli	4
(Italy) Ebimotors	Porsche 911 GT3-RSR	Porsche 3.6 L Flat-6	P	74	(Italy) Luigi Moccia	All
(Italy) Ebimotors	Porsche 911 GT3-RSR	Porsche 3.6 L Flat-6	P	74	(Italy) Emanuele Busnelli	All
(Italy) Ebimotors	Porsche 911 GT3-RSR	Porsche 3.6 L Flat-6	P	74	(United Kingdom) Johnny Mowlem	4
(Italy) Ebimotors	Porsche 911 GT3-RSR	Porsche 3.6 L Flat-6	P	75	(Italy) Luca Riccitelli	1–9
(Italy) Ebimotors	Porsche 911 GT3-RSR	Porsche 3.6 L Flat-6	P	75	(France) Emmanuel Collard	1–7, 9–10
(Italy) Ebimotors	Porsche 911 GT3-RSR	Porsche 3.6 L Flat-6	P	75	(France) Romain Dumas	4
(Italy) Ebimotors	Porsche 911 GT3-RSR	Porsche 3.6 L Flat-6	P	75	(Germany) Uwe Alzen	8
(Italy) Ebimotors	Porsche 911 GT3-RSR	Porsche 3.6 L Flat-6	P	75	(Germany) Mike Rockenfeller	10
(Slovakia) Autoracing Club Bratislava	Porsche 911 GT3-R; Porsche 911 GT3-RS	Porsche 3.6 L Flat-6	D	77	(Slovakia) Štefan Rosina	1–8, 10
(Slovakia) Autoracing Club Bratislava	Porsche 911 GT3-R; Porsche 911 GT3-RS	Porsche 3.6 L Flat-6	D	77	(Slovakia) Miroslav Konôpka	1–8, 10
(Slovakia) Autoracing Club Bratislava	Porsche 911 GT3-R; Porsche 911 GT3-RS	Porsche 3.6 L Flat-6	D	77	(Belgium) Damien Coens	4
(Slovakia) Autoracing Club Bratislava	Porsche 911 GT3-R; Porsche 911 GT3-RS	Porsche 3.6 L Flat-6	D	77	(Belgium) Steve Van Bellingen	4
(Belgium) Ice Pol Racing Team	Porsche 911 GT3-RSR	Porsche 3.6 L Flat-6	D	78	(Belgium) Marc Goossens	4
(Belgium) Ice Pol Racing Team	Porsche 911 GT3-RSR	Porsche 3.6 L Flat-6	D	78	(Belgium) Marc Duez	4
(Belgium) Ice Pol Racing Team	Porsche 911 GT3-RSR	Porsche 3.6 L Flat-6	D	78	(Belgium) Christian Lefort	4
(Belgium) Ice Pol Racing Team	Porsche 911 GT3-RSR	Porsche 3.6 L Flat-6	D	78	(Belgium) Yves Lambert	4
(Netherlands) Spyker Squadron	Spyker C8 Spyder GT2R	Audi 3.8 L V8	D	79	(Netherlands) Jeroen Bleekemolen	10
(Netherlands) Spyker Squadron	Spyker C8 Spyder GT2R	Audi 3.8 L V8	D	79	(United Kingdom) Jonny Kane	10
(Netherlands) Spyker Squadron	Spyker C8 Spyder GT2R	Audi 3.8 L V8	D	80	(Netherlands) Jeroen Bleekemolen	4
(Netherlands) Spyker Squadron	Spyker C8 Spyder GT2R	Audi 3.8 L V8	D	80	(Netherlands) Donny Crevels	4
(Netherlands) Spyker Squadron	Spyker C8 Spyder GT2R	Audi 3.8 L V8	D	80	(United Kingdom) Jonny Kane	4
(Netherlands) Spyker Squadron	Spyker C8 Spyder GT2R	Audi 3.8 L V8	D	80	(Netherlands) Peter Kox	10
(Netherlands) Spyker Squadron	Spyker C8 Spyder GT2R	Audi 3.8 L V8	D	80	(United Kingdom) Peter Dumbreck	10
(Italy) Edil Cris Racing Team	Ferrari F430 GTC	Ferrari 4.3 L V8	M	82	(Italy) Paolo Ruberti	9
(Italy) Edil Cris Racing Team	Ferrari F430 GTC	Ferrari 4.3 L V8	M	82	(Italy) Raffaele Gianmaria	9
(Austria) Race Alliance Motorsport	Porsche 911 GT3-RSR	Porsche 3.6 L Flat-6	D M	99	(Austria) Thomas Grüber	1–3, 7–8, 10
(Austria) Race Alliance Motorsport	Porsche 911 GT3-RSR	Porsche 3.6 L Flat-6	D M	99	(Austria) Lukas Lichtner-Hoyer	1–3, 7–8, 10

== Season results ==
Overall winners in bold.

Rnd	Circuit	GT1 Winning Team	GT2 Winning Team	Results
Rnd	Circuit	GT1 Winning Drivers	GT2 Winning Drivers	Results
1	Silverstone	**(Germany) #1 Vitaphone Racing Team**	(Italy) #58 AF Corse	Results
1	Silverstone	(Italy) **Andrea Bertolini** (Germany) **Michael Bartels**	(Brazil) Jaime Melo (Italy) Matteo Bobbi	Results
2	Brno	**(Germany) #9 Zakspeed Racing**	(Monaco) #55 JMB Racing	Results
2	Brno	(Czech Republic) **Jaroslav Janiš** (Germany) **Sascha Bert**	(United Kingdom) Tim Sugden (Switzerland) Iradj Alexander	Results
3	Oschersleben	**(Germany) #1 Vitaphone Racing Team**	(United Kingdom) #62 Scuderia Ecosse	Results
3	Oschersleben	(Italy) **Andrea Bertolini** (Germany) **Michael Bartels**	(United Kingdom) Nathan Kinch (United Kingdom) Andrew Kirkaldy	Results
4	Spa	**(Germany) #1 Vitaphone Racing Team**	(Italy) #59 AF Corse	Results
4	Spa	(Italy) **Andrea Bertolini** (Germany) **Michael Bartels** (Belgium) **Eric van de Poele**	(Finland) Mika Salo (Portugal) Rui Águas (Germany) Timo Scheider	Results
5	Paul Ricard	**(Belgium) #4 GLPK-Carsport**	(United Kingdom) #62 Scuderia Ecosse	Results
5	Paul Ricard	(Netherlands) **Mike Hezemans** (Belgium) **Bert Longin** (Belgium) **Anthony Kumpen**	(United Kingdom) Nathan Kinch (United Kingdom) Andrew Kirkaldy	Results
6	Dijon	**(Germany) #2 Vitaphone Racing Team**	(Italy) #58 AF Corse	Results
6	Dijon	(Italy) **Thomas Biagi** (United Kingdom) **Jamie Davies**	(Brazil) Jaime Melo (Italy) Matteo Bobbi	Results
7	Mugello	**(Austria) #33 Race Alliance**	(Italy) #75 Ebimotors	Results
7	Mugello	(Austria) **Karl Wendlinger** (Austria) **Philipp Peter**	(France) Emmanuel Collard (Italy) Luca Riccitelli	Results
8	Hungaroring	**(Germany) #9 Zakspeed Racing**	(United Kingdom) #62 Scuderia Ecosse	Results
8	Hungaroring	(Czech Republic) **Jaroslav Janiš** (Germany) **Sascha Bert** (Italy) **Andrea Montermini**	(United Kingdom) Nathan Kinch (United Kingdom) Andrew Kirkaldy	Results
9	Adria	**(Germany) #2 Vitaphone Racing Team**	(United Kingdom) #63 Scuderia Ecosse	Results
9	Adria	(Italy) **Thomas Biagi** (United Kingdom) **Jamie Davies**	(United Kingdom) Tim Mullen (United Kingdom) Marino Franchitti	Results
10	Dubai	**(Germany) #5 Phoenix Racing**	(United Kingdom) #63 Scuderia Ecosse	Results
10	Dubai	(Italy) **Andrea Piccini** (Switzerland) **Jean-Denis Délétraz**	(United Kingdom) Tim Mullen (Canada) Chris Niarchos	Results

== Drivers Championship ==
Points are awarded to the top 8 finishers in the order of 10–8–6–5–4–3–2–1 except at the Spa 24 Hours. Drivers who do not drive the car for a minimum distance do not score points.

=== GT1 Standings ===
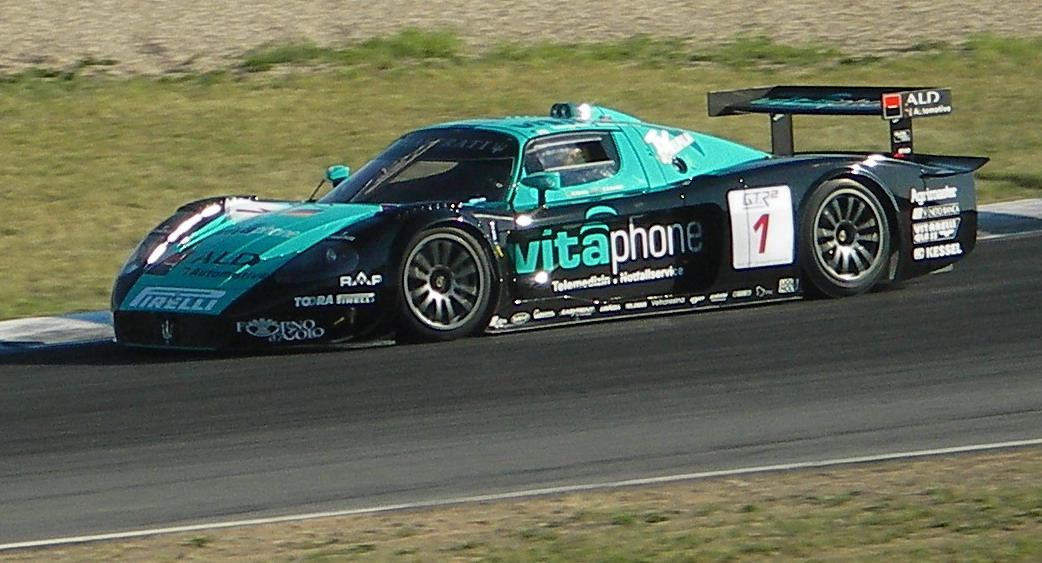
Michael Bartels and Andrea Bertolini won the GT1 title at the wheel of a Maserati MC12.

Pos.	Driver	Team	SIL (United Kingdom)	BRN (Czech Republic)	OSC (Germany)	SPA (Belgium)			PRI (France)	DIJ (France)	MUG (Italy)	BUD (Hungary)	ADR (Italy)	DUB (United Arab Emirates)	Total points
Pos.	Driver	Team	SIL (United Kingdom)	BRN (Czech Republic)	OSC (Germany)	6H	12H	24H	PRI (France)	DIJ (France)	MUG (Italy)	BUD (Hungary)	ADR (Italy)	DUB (United Arab Emirates)	Total points
1	(Germany) Michael Bartels	(Germany) Vitaphone Racing Team	1	4	1	2	2	1	7	5	2	5	2	7	71
1	(Italy) Andrea Bertolini	(Germany) Vitaphone Racing Team	1	4	1	2	2	1	7	5	2	5	2	7	71
2	(Switzerland) Jean-Denis Délétraz	(Germany) Phoenix Racing	6	2	3	1	1	2	6	3	6	4	Ret	1	62
2	(Italy) Andrea Piccini	(Germany) Phoenix Racing	6	2	3	1	1	2	6	3	6	4	Ret	1	62
3	(Czech Republic) Jaroslav Janiš	(Germany) Zakspeed Racing	2	1	4	4	4	6		4	4	1	6		58
3	(Czech Republic) Jaroslav Janiš	(Austria) Race Alliance Motorsport												5	58
4	(Germany) Sascha Bert	(Germany) Zakspeed Racing	2	1	4	4	4	6	8	4	4	1	6	8	56
5	(United Kingdom) Jamie Davies	(Germany) Vitaphone Racing Team	5	7	2	Ret	Ret	Ret	3	1	3	7	1	3	54
5	(Italy) Thomas Biagi	(Germany) Vitaphone Racing Team	5	7	2	Ret	Ret	Ret	3	1	3	7	1	3	54
6	(Italy) Fabio Babini	(Italy) Aston Martin Racing BMS	3	3	5	7	5	4	5	6	5	3	4	4	51
7	(Belgium) Bert Longin	(Belgium) GLPK-Carsport	8	8	Ret	3	3	3	1	Ret	7	2	3	2	48
7	(Belgium) Anthony Kumpen	(Belgium) GLPK-Carsport	8	8	Ret	3	3	3	1	Ret	7	2	3	2	48
7	(Netherlands) Mike Hezemans	(Belgium) GLPK-Carsport	8	8	Ret	3	3	3	1	Ret	7	2	3	2	48
8	(Italy) Fabrizio Gollin	(Italy) Aston Martin Racing BMS	3	3	5	6	Ret	Ret	5	7	Ret	6	5	6	33.5
9	(Austria) Karl Wendlinger	(Austria) Race Alliance Motorsport	Ret	Ret	7	5	8	8	4	2	1	Ret	Ret	5	32.5
9	(Austria) Philipp Peter	(Austria) Race Alliance Motorsport	Ret	Ret	7	5	8	8	4	2	1	Ret	Ret	5	32.5
10	(Italy) Christian Pescatori	(Italy) Aston Martin Racing BMS	7	5	6	7	5	4	9	6	5		4		29
11	(Italy) Andrea Montermini	(Germany) Zakspeed Racing				4	4	6	8		4	1			24
12	(Portugal) Miguel Ramos	(Italy) Aston Martin Racing BMS	7	5	6	6	Ret	Ret	9	7	Ret	6	5	6	22.5
13	(Belgium) Eric van de Poele	(Germany) Vitaphone Racing Team				2	2	1						7	20
14	(Belgium) Stéphane Lémeret	(Germany) Phoenix Racing				1	1	2							18
14	(Switzerland) Marcel Fässler	(Germany) Phoenix Racing				1	1	2							18
15	(Netherlands) Jos Menten	(Belgium) PSI Experience				9	6	5	2						14.5
15	(Netherlands) Jos Menten	(Germany) Zakspeed Racing												8	14.5
16	(France) Jean-Philippe Belloc	(Belgium) PSI Experience				9	6	5	2						13.5
17	(France) Christophe Bouchut	(United Kingdom) Cirtek Motorsport	4												13.5
17	(France) Christophe Bouchut	(Germany) B-Racing RS Line Team		6	9										13.5
17	(France) Christophe Bouchut	(Austria) Race Alliance Motorsport				5	8	8							13.5
17	(France) Christophe Bouchut	(Germany) All-Inkl.com Racing								8	Ret	8	Ret		13.5
18	(Italy) Matteo Malucelli	(Italy) Aston Martin Racing BMS				6	Ret	Ret	9			3		4	12.5
19	(Belgium) Kurt Mollekens	(Belgium) GLPK-Carsport				3	3	3							12
20	(Netherlands) Peter Kox	(Germany) B-Racing RS Line Team		6											12
20	(Netherlands) Peter Kox	(Italy) Aston Martin Racing BMS				7	5	4							12
20	(Netherlands) Peter Kox	(Germany) All-Inkl.com Racing										8	Ret		12
21	(Czech Republic) Tomáš Enge	(Italy) Aston Martin Racing BMS				7	5	4							8
22	(Czech Republic) Jan Charouz	(Germany) Zakspeed Racing				4	4	6							8
23	(Belgium) Vincent Vosse	(Germany) Vitaphone Racing Team				Ret	Ret	Ret						3	6
24	(France) Patrick Bornhauser	(Belgium) PSI Experience				9	6	5							5.5
24	(Belgium) Frédéric Bouvy	(Belgium) PSI Experience				9	6	5							5.5
25	(Australia) David Brabham	(United Kingdom) Cirtek Motorsport	4												5
26	(Finland) Pertti Kuismanen	(Belgium) PSI Experience				8	7	7							3.5
26	(Finland) Markus Palttala	(Belgium) PSI Experience				8	7	7							3.5
26	(Belgium) Bernard Dehez	(Belgium) PSI Experience				8	7	7							3.5
26	(Belgium) Vincent Radermecker	(Belgium) PSI Experience				8	7	7							3.5
27	(Austria) Robert Lechner	(Austria) Race Alliance Motorsport	Ret			5	8	8							3.5
28	(United Kingdom) Shaun Balfe	(United Kingdom) Balfe Motorsport	9	Ret	8				Ret	Ret	8	9			2
29	(Italy) Gabriele Lancieri	(Italy) Aston Martin Racing BMS				6	Ret	Ret							1.5
30	(United Kingdom) Jamie Derbyshire	(United Kingdom) Balfe Motorsport	9	Ret	8										1
31	(Switzerland) Benjamin Leuenberger	(Germany) All-Inkl.com Racing								8	Ret				1
31	(United Kingdom) Nigel Taylor	(United Kingdom) Balfe Motorsport							Ret	Ret	8				1
Pos.	Driver	Team	SIL (United Kingdom)	BRN (Czech Republic)	OSC (Germany)	6H	12H	24H	PRI (France)	DIJ (France)	MUG (Italy)	BUD (Hungary)	ADR (Italy)	DUB (United Arab Emirates)	Total points
Pos.	Driver	Team	SIL (United Kingdom)	BRN (Czech Republic)	OSC (Germany)	SPA (Belgium)			PRI (France)	DIJ (France)	MUG (Italy)	BUD (Hungary)	ADR (Italy)	DUB (United Arab Emirates)	Total points

Colour	Result
Gold	Winner
Silver	Second place
Bronze	Third place
Green	Points classification
Blue	Non-points classification
Blue	Non-classified finish (NC)
Purple	Retired, not classified (Ret)
Red	Did not qualify (DNQ)
Red	Did not pre-qualify (DNPQ)
Black	Disqualified (DSQ)
White	Did not start (DNS)
White	Withdrew (WD)
White	Race cancelled (C)
Blank	Did not practice (DNP)
Blank	Did not arrive (DNA)
Blank	Excluded (EX)

=== GT2 Standings ===
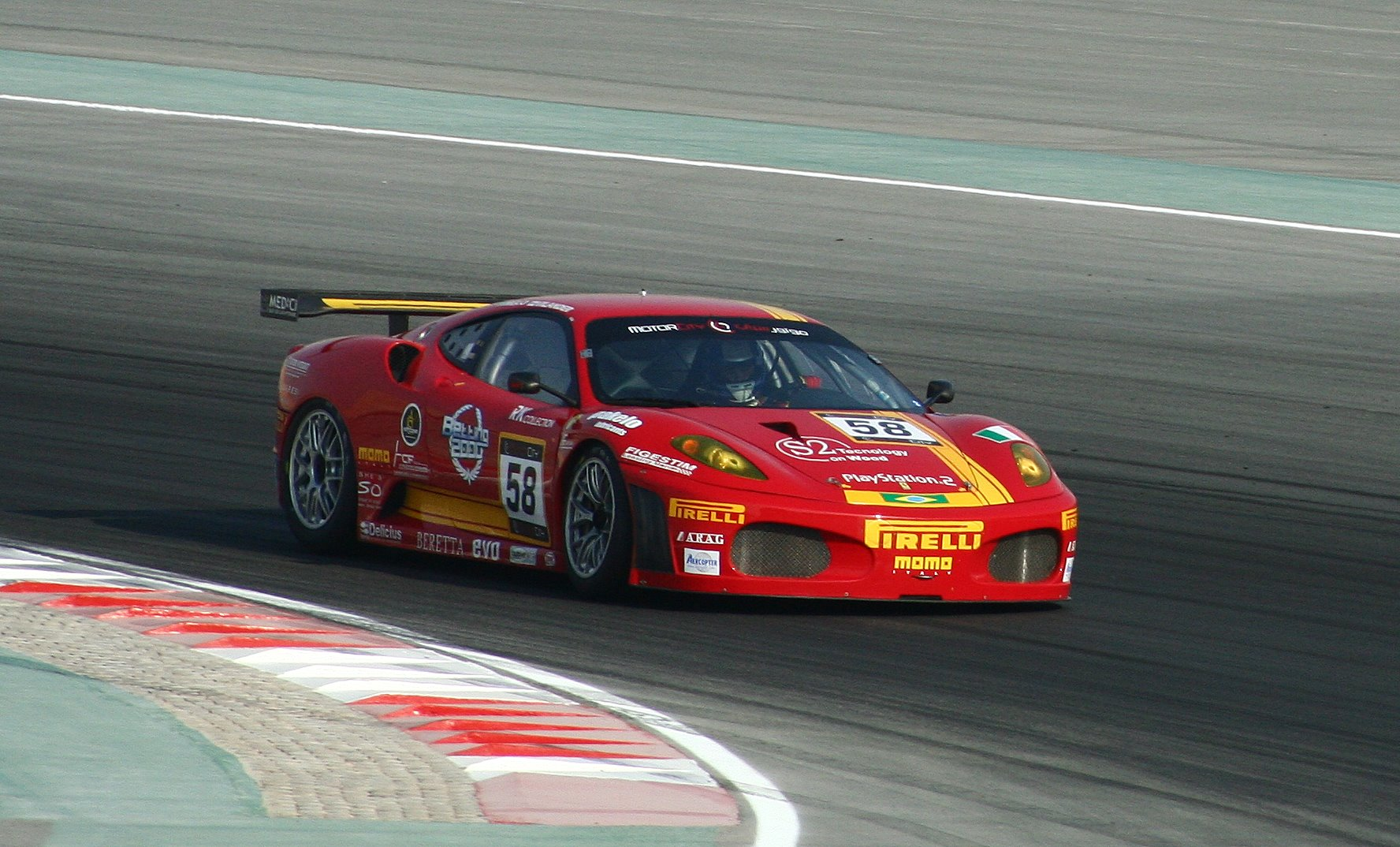
AF Corse drivers finished in the top four positions, with Jaime Melo winning the championship.

Pos.	Driver	Team	SIL (United Kingdom)	BRN (Czech Republic)	OSC (Germany)	SPA (Belgium)			PRI (France)	DIJ (France)	MUG (Italy)	BUD (Hungary)	ADR (Italy)	DUB (United Arab Emirates)	Total points
Pos.	Driver	Team	SIL (United Kingdom)	BRN (Czech Republic)	OSC (Germany)	6H	12H	24H	PRI (France)	DIJ (France)	MUG (Italy)	BUD (Hungary)	ADR (Italy)	DUB (United Arab Emirates)	Total points
1	(Brazil) Jaime Melo	(Italy) AF Corse	1	3	6	2	1	2	4	1	2	2	5	2	79
2	(Italy) Matteo Bobbi	(Italy) AF Corse	1	3	6	2	1	2	4	1	2	2	5		71
3	(Finland) Mika Salo	(Italy) AF Corse	3	6	2	1	2	1	5	3	4	5	DSQ	3	61
3	(Portugal) Rui Águas	(Italy) AF Corse	3	6	2	1	2	1	5	3	4	5	DSQ	3	61
4	(United Kingdom) Tim Mullen	(United Kingdom) Scuderia Ecosse	Ret	4	3	8	9	6	2	2	5	3	1	1	60.5
5	(United Kingdom) Nathan Kinch	(United Kingdom) Scuderia Ecosse	Ret	12	1	5	5	3	1	6	Ret	1	Ret	9	43
5	(United Kingdom) Andrew Kirkaldy	(United Kingdom) Scuderia Ecosse	Ret	12	1	5	5	3	1	6	Ret	1	Ret		43
6	(United Kingdom) Tim Sugden	(Monaco) JMB Racing	12	1	4	14	Ret	Ret	3	Ret	3	4	3	5	42
6	(Switzerland) Iradj Alexander	(Monaco) JMB Racing	12	1	4	14	Ret	Ret	3	Ret	3	4	3	5	42
7	(France) Emmanuel Collard	(Italy) Ebimotors	2	2	5	13	Ret	Ret	8	Ret	1		Ret	6	34
8	(Italy) Luca Riccitelli	(Italy) Ebimotors	2	2	5	13	Ret	Ret	8	Ret	1	7	Ret		33
9	(Canada) Chris Niarchos	(United Kingdom) Scuderia Ecosse	Ret		3	8	9	6		2	5	3		1	31.5
10	(United Kingdom) Marino Franchitti	(United Kingdom) Scuderia Ecosse				5	5	3	2				1	9	28
11	(Germany) Christian Ried	(Germany) Team Felbermayr-Proton	4	7	7	9	8	5	Ret	4	6	6	Ret	8	25.5
11	(Austria) Horst Felbermayr Jr.	(Germany) Team Felbermayr-Proton	4	7	7	9	8	5	Ret	4	6	6	Ret	8	25.5
12	(Italy) Luigi Moccia	(Italy) Ebimotors	6	5	8	11	7	10	Ret	5	7	8	4	7	23
12	(Italy) Emanuele Busnelli	(Italy) Ebimotors	6	5	8	11	7	10	Ret	5	7	8	4	7	23
13	(Germany) Timo Scheider	(Italy) AF Corse				1	2	1							19
14	(Monaco) Stéphane Ortelli	(Italy) AF Corse				2	1	2							17
15	(Netherlands) Jeroen Bleekemolen	(Netherlands) Spyker Squadron				4	4	4						4	15
15	(United Kingdom) Jonny Kane	(Netherlands) Spyker Squadron				4	4	4						4	15
16	(Netherlands) Donny Crevels	(Netherlands) Spyker Squadron				4	4	4							10
17	(Italy) Paolo Ruberti	(Italy) Edil Cris Racing Team											2		8
17	(Italy) Raffaele Giammaria	(Italy) Edil Cris Racing Team											2		8
17	(Finland) Toni Vilander	(Italy) AF Corse												2	8
18	(Germany) Wolfgang Kaufmann	(Austria) Renauer Motorsport Team	7	13	Ret	6	6	Ret	7						7
18	(Italy) Luca Moro	(Austria) Renauer Motorsport Team	7	13	Ret	6	6	Ret	7						7
19	(Germany) Gerold Ried	(Germany) Team Felbermayr-Proton	8	10	9	9	8	5	Ret	8	Ret	11	Ret	12	6.5
19	(Austria) Horst Felbermayr	(Germany) Team Felbermayr-Proton	8	10	9	9	8	5	Ret	8	Ret	11	Ret	12	6.5
20	(Switzerland) Gabriele Gardel	(Italy) GPC Sport				3	3	Ret							6
20	(Italy) Fabrizio De Simone	(Italy) GPC Sport				3	3	Ret							6
20	(Italy) Luca Drudi	(Italy) GPC Sport				3	3	Ret							6
20	(Italy) Marco Cioci	(Italy) GPC Sport				3	3	Ret							6
21	(United Kingdom) Phil Bennett	(United Kingdom) Scuderia Ecosse		4											5
22	(United Kingdom) Lawrence Tomlinson	(United Kingdom) Team LNT	5												4
22	(United Kingdom) Richard Dean	(United Kingdom) Team LNT	5												4
23	(Spain) Domingo Romero	(Spain) RSV Motorsport				15	12	8	6						4
23	(Sweden) Peter Sundberg	(Spain) RSV Motorsport				15	12	8	6						4
24	(Denmark) Allan Simonsen	(United Kingdom) Scuderia Ecosse				8	9	6							3.5
25	(Germany) Mike Rockenfeller	(Italy) Ebimotors												6	3
26	(Belgium) Yves Lambert	(Belgium) Ice Pol Racing Team				7	10	7							3
26	(Belgium) Christian Lefort	(Belgium) Ice Pol Racing Team				7	10	7							3
26	(Belgium) Marc Goossens	(Belgium) Ice Pol Racing Team				7	10	7							3
26	(Belgium) Marc Duez	(Belgium) Ice Pol Racing Team				7	10	7							3
27	(Slovakia) Miroslav Konôpka	(Slovakia) Autoracing Club Bratislava	10	11	Ret	DNS	DNS	DNS	9	7	8	Ret		Ret	3
27	(Slovakia) Štefan Rosina	(Slovakia) Autoracing Club Bratislava	10	11	Ret	DNS	DNS	DNS	9	7	8	Ret		Ret	3
28	(Austria) Manfred Jurasz	(Austria) Renauer Motorsport Team				6	6	Ret							3
28	(Hong Kong) Darryl O'Young	(Austria) Renauer Motorsport Team				6	6	Ret							3
29	(Germany) Uwe Alzen	(Italy) Ebimotors										7			2
30	(Netherlands) Peter Kutemann	(Monaco) JMB Racing	11	8	10	10	Ret	Ret	10	9	9	9		10	1
31	(France) Antoine Gosse	(Monaco) JMB Racing	11	8	10	10	Ret	Ret	10	9	9				1
32	(Germany) Roland Severin	(Spain) RSV Motorsport				15	12	8	11						1
32	(France) Michel Ligonnet	(Spain) RSV Motorsport				15	12	8	11						1
33	(United Kingdom) Johnny Mowlem	(Italy) Ebimotors				11	7	10							1
Pos.	Driver	Team	SIL (United Kingdom)	BRN (Czech Republic)	OSC (Germany)	6H	12H	24H	PRI (France)	DIJ (France)	MUG (Italy)	BUD (Hungary)	ADR (Italy)	DUB (United Arab Emirates)	Total points
Pos.	Driver	Team	SIL (United Kingdom)	BRN (Czech Republic)	OSC (Germany)	SPA (Belgium)			PRI (France)	DIJ (France)	MUG (Italy)	BUD (Hungary)	ADR (Italy)	DUB (United Arab Emirates)	Total points

== Teams Championship ==
Points are awarded to the top 8 finishers in the order of 10–8–6–5–4–3–2–1 except at the Spa 24 Hours, where half points are also granted for the leaders after 6 and 12 hours. Both cars score points towards the championship regardless of finishing position.

=== GT1 Standings ===
Pos.	Team	SIL (United Kingdom)	BRN (Czech Republic)	OSC (Germany)	SPA (Belgium)			PRI (France)	DIJ (France)	MUG (Italy)	BUD (Hungary)	ADR (Italy)	DUB (United Arab Emirates)	Total points
Pos.	Team	SIL (United Kingdom)	BRN (Czech Republic)	OSC (Germany)	6H	12H	24H	PRI (France)	DIJ (France)	MUG (Italy)	BUD (Hungary)	ADR (Italy)	DUB (United Arab Emirates)	Total points
1	(Germany) Vitaphone Racing Team	1	4	1	2	2	1	3	1	2	5	1	3	125
1	(Germany) Vitaphone Racing Team	5	7	2	Ret	Ret	Ret	7	5	3	7	2	7	125
2	(Italy) Aston Martin Racing BMS	3	3	5	7	5	4	5	6	5	3	4	4	73.5
2	(Italy) Aston Martin Racing BMS	7	5	6	6	Ret	Ret	9	7	Ret	6	5	6	73.5
3	(Germany) Phoenix Racing	6	2	3	1	1	2	6	3	6	4	Ret	1	62
4	(Germany) Zakspeed Racing	2	1	4	4	4	6	8	4	4	1	6	8	56
5	(Belgium) GLPK-Carsport	8	8	Ret	3	3	3	1	Ret	7	2	3	2	48
6	(Austria) Race Alliance Motorsport	Ret	Ret	7	5	8	8	4	2	1	Ret	Ret	5	32.5
6	(Austria) Race Alliance Motorsport	Ret												32.5
7	(Belgium) PSI Experience				9	6	5	2						17
7	(Belgium) PSI Experience				8	7	7							17
8	(United Kingdom) Cirtek Motorsport	4												5
9	(Germany) B-Racing RS Line Team	Ret	6	9										3
10	(United Kingdom) Balfe Motorsport	9	Ret	8				Ret	Ret	8	9			2
11	(Germany) All-Inkl.com Racing								8	Ret	8	Ret		2
-	(Belgium) Renstal Excelsior				Ret	Ret	Ret							0
-	(France) Red Racing							Ret	DNS					0
-	(Italy) Scuderia Playteam									Ret				0

Colour	Result
Gold	Winner
Silver	Second place
Bronze	Third place
Green	Points classification
Blue	Non-points classification
Blue	Non-classified finish (NC)
Purple	Retired, not classified (Ret)
Red	Did not qualify (DNQ)
Red	Did not pre-qualify (DNPQ)
Black	Disqualified (DSQ)
White	Did not start (DNS)
White	Withdrew (WD)
White	Race cancelled (C)
Blank	Did not practice (DNP)
Blank	Did not arrive (DNA)
Blank	Excluded (EX)

=== GT2 Standings ===
Pos.	Team	SIL (United Kingdom)	BRN (Czech Republic)	OSC (Germany)	SPA (Belgium)			PRI (France)	DIJ (France)	MUG (Italy)	BUD (Hungary)	ADR (Italy)	DUB (United Arab Emirates)	Total points
Pos.	Team	SIL (United Kingdom)	BRN (Czech Republic)	OSC (Germany)	6H	12H	24H	PRI (France)	DIJ (France)	MUG (Italy)	BUD (Hungary)	ADR (Italy)	DUB (United Arab Emirates)	Total points
1	(Italy) AF Corse	1	3	2	1	2	1	4	1	2	2	5	2	140
1	(Italy) AF Corse	3	6	6	2	1	2	5	3	4	5	DSQ	3	140
2	(United Kingdom) Scuderia Ecosse	Ret	4	1	5	5	3	1	2	5	1	1	1	103.5
2	(United Kingdom) Scuderia Ecosse	Ret	12	3	8	9	6	2	6	Ret	3	Ret	9	103.5
3	(Italy) Ebimotors	2	2	5	11	7	10	8	5	1	7	4	6	59
3	(Italy) Ebimotors	6	5	8	13	Ret	Ret	Ret	Ret	7	8	Ret	7	59
4	(Monaco) JMB Racing	11	1	4	10	Ret	Ret	3	9	3	4	3	5	43
4	(Monaco) JMB Racing	13	8	10	14	Ret	Ret	10	Ret	9	9		10	43
5	(Germany) Team Felbermayr-Proton	4	7	7	9	8	5	Ret	4	6	6	Ret	8	27.5
5	(Germany) Team Felbermayr-Proton	8	10	9				Ret	8	Ret	11	Ret	12	27.5
6	(Netherlands) Spyker Squadron				4	4	4						4	15
6	(Netherlands) Spyker Squadron												Ret	15
7	(Italy) Edil Cris Racing Team											2		8
8	(Austria) Renauer Motorsport Team	7	13	Ret	6	6	Ret	7			12			7
8	(Austria) Renauer Motorsport Team	12	14											7
9	(Italy) GPC Sport				3	3	Ret							6
10	(United Kingdom) Team LNT	5												4
11	(Spain) RSV Motorsport				15	12	8	6						4
11	(Spain) RSV Motorsport							11						4
12	(Slovakia) Autoracing Club Bratislava	10	11	Ret	DNS	DNS	DNS	9	7	8	Ret		Ret	3
13	(Belgium) Ice Pol Racing Team				7	10	7							3
-	(Austria) Race Alliance Motorsport	9	9	Ret						Ret	10		11	0
-	(Italy) AB Motorsport				12	11	9							0
-	(United Kingdom) RJN Motorsport	Ret												0

== Manufacturers Cup ==
Points are awarded to the top 8 finishers in the order of 10–8–6–5–4–3–2–1 except at the Spa 24 Hours. All cars score points towards the championship regardless of finishing position.

=== GT1 Standings ===
Pos	Manufacturer	Rd 1	Rd 2	Rd 3	Rd 4	Rd 5	Rd 6	Rd 7	Rd 8	Rd 9	Rd 10	Total
1	(United Kingdom) Aston Martin	16	18	15	31	12	19	17	14	9	22	173
2	(Italy) Maserati	14	7	18	18	8	14	14		18	8	119
3	(United States) Corvette	1	1		21	18		2	8	6	8	65
4	(United States) Saleen	8	10	6	8	1	5	6	10	3	1	58
5	(Italy) Lamborghini		3				1		1			5

=== GT2 Standings ===
Pos	Manufacturer	Rd 1	Rd 2	Rd 3	Rd 4	Rd 5	Rd 6	Rd 7	Rd 8	Rd 9	Rd 10	Total
1	(Italy) Ferrari	16	24	29	55	29	27	23	29	28	28	288
2	(Germany) Porsche	18	14	7	11.5	3	12	16		5	6	98.5
3	(Netherlands) Spyker				10						5	15
4	(United States) Panoz	4										4

== Bibliography ==
- Loisy, Olivier (2006). FIA GT & GT3 European Championship 2006 Yearbook. Paris: Apollo Publishing. ISBN 978-2952104449.
