= 2006 FIA GT Paul Ricard 500km =

Circuit Paul Ricard 1A-V2 (pit road was different before 2019

The 2006 FIA GT Paul Ricard 500 km was the fifth race for the 2006 FIA GT Championship season. Back of racing after summer break It took place on August 20, 2006.

== Official results ==
Class winners in bold. Cars failing to complete 70% of winner's distance marked as Not Classified (NC).

Pos	Class	No	Team	Drivers	Chassis	Tyre	Laps
Pos	Class	No	Team	Drivers	Engine	Tyre	Laps
1	**GT1**	**4**	**(Belgium) GLPK-Carsport**	**(Netherlands) Mike Hezemans (Belgium) Bert Longin (Belgium) Anthony Kumpen**	**Chevrolet Corvette C6.R**	MI	**87**
1	**GT1**	**4**	**(Belgium) GLPK-Carsport**	**(Netherlands) Mike Hezemans (Belgium) Bert Longin (Belgium) Anthony Kumpen**	**Chevrolet 7.0L V8**	MI	**87**
2	GT1	34	(Belgium) PSI Experience	(Netherlands) Jos Menten (France) Jean-Philippe Belloc	Chevrolet Corvette C6.R	D	87
2	GT1	34	(Belgium) PSI Experience	(Netherlands) Jos Menten (France) Jean-Philippe Belloc	Chevrolet 7.0L V8	D	87
3	GT1	2	(Germany) Vitaphone Racing Team	(Italy) Thomas Biagi (United Kingdom) Jamie Davies	Maserati MC12 GT1	P	87
3	GT1	2	(Germany) Vitaphone Racing Team	(Italy) Thomas Biagi (United Kingdom) Jamie Davies	Maserati 6.0L V12	P	87
4	GT1	33	(Austria) Race Alliance	(Austria) Karl Wendlinger (Austria) Philipp Peter	Aston Martin DBR9	D	87
4	GT1	33	(Austria) Race Alliance	(Austria) Karl Wendlinger (Austria) Philipp Peter	Aston Martin 6.0L V12	D	87
5	GT1	23	(Italy) Aston Martin Racing BMS	(Italy) Fabrizio Gollin (Italy) Fabio Babini	Aston Martin DBR9	P	86
5	GT1	23	(Italy) Aston Martin Racing BMS	(Italy) Fabrizio Gollin (Italy) Fabio Babini	Aston Martin 6.0L V12	P	86
6	GT1	5	(Germany) Phoenix Racing	(Switzerland) Jean-Denis Délétraz (Italy) Andrea Piccini	Aston Martin DBR9	MI	86
6	GT1	5	(Germany) Phoenix Racing	(Switzerland) Jean-Denis Délétraz (Italy) Andrea Piccini	Aston Martin 6.0L V12	MI	86
7	GT1	1	(Germany) Vitaphone Racing Team	(Italy) Andrea Bertolini (Germany) Michael Bartels	Maserati MC12 GT1	P	86
7	GT1	1	(Germany) Vitaphone Racing Team	(Italy) Andrea Bertolini (Germany) Michael Bartels	Maserati 6.0L V12	P	86
8	GT1	9	(Germany) Zakspeed Racing	(Czech Republic) Jaroslav Janiš (Germany) Sascha Bert	Saleen S7-R	MI	86
8	GT1	9	(Germany) Zakspeed Racing	(Czech Republic) Jaroslav Janiš (Germany) Sascha Bert	Ford 7.0L V8	MI	86
9	**GT2**	**62**	**(United Kingdom) Scuderia Ecosse**	**(United Kingdom) Nathan Kinch (United Kingdom) Andrew Kirkaldy**	**Ferrari F430 GT2**	MI	**83**
9	**GT2**	**62**	**(United Kingdom) Scuderia Ecosse**	**(United Kingdom) Nathan Kinch (United Kingdom) Andrew Kirkaldy**	**Ferrari 4.0L V8**	MI	**83**
10	GT2	63	(United Kingdom) Scuderia Ecosse	(United Kingdom) Marino Franchitti (United Kingdom) Tim Mullen	Ferrari F430 GT2	MI	83
10	GT2	63	(United Kingdom) Scuderia Ecosse	(United Kingdom) Marino Franchitti (United Kingdom) Tim Mullen	Ferrari 4.0L V8	MI	83
11	GT2	55	(Monaco) JMB Racing	(United Kingdom) Tim Sugden (Switzerland) Iradj Alexander	Ferrari F430 GT2	P	82
11	GT2	55	(Monaco) JMB Racing	(United Kingdom) Tim Sugden (Switzerland) Iradj Alexander	Ferrari 4.0L V8	P	82
12	GT2	58	(Italy) AF Corse	(Brazil) Jaime Melo (Italy) Matteo Bobbi	Ferrari F430 GT2	P	82
12	GT2	58	(Italy) AF Corse	(Brazil) Jaime Melo (Italy) Matteo Bobbi	Ferrari 4.0L V8	P	82
13	GT2	59	(Italy) AF Corse	(Finland) Mika Salo (Portugal) Rui Águas	Ferrari F430 GT2	P	82
13	GT2	59	(Italy) AF Corse	(Finland) Mika Salo (Portugal) Rui Águas	Ferrari 4.0L V8	P	82
14	GT2	81	(Spain) RSV Motorsport	(Sweden) Peter Sundberg (Spain) Domingo Romero	Ferrari F430 GT2	MI	80
14	GT2	81	(Spain) RSV Motorsport	(Sweden) Peter Sundberg (Spain) Domingo Romero	Ferrari 4.0L V8	MI	80
15	GT2	52	(Austria) Renauer Motorsport Team	(Germany) Wolfgang Kaufmann (Italy) Luca Moro	Porsche 911 GT3-RSR	D	80
15	GT2	52	(Austria) Renauer Motorsport Team	(Germany) Wolfgang Kaufmann (Italy) Luca Moro	Porsche 3.6L Flat-6	D	80
16	GT1	24	(Italy) Aston Martin Racing BMS	(Italy) Christian Pescatori (Portugal) Miguel Ramos (Italy) Matteo Malucelli	Aston Martin DBR9	P	79
16	GT1	24	(Italy) Aston Martin Racing BMS	(Italy) Christian Pescatori (Portugal) Miguel Ramos (Italy) Matteo Malucelli	Aston Martin 6.0L V12	P	79
17	GT2	75	(Italy) Ebimotors	(France) Emmanuel Collard (Italy) Luca Riccitelli	Porsche 911 GT3-RSR	P	78
17	GT2	75	(Italy) Ebimotors	(France) Emmanuel Collard (Italy) Luca Riccitelli	Porsche 3.6L Flat-6	P	78
18	GT2	77	(Slovakia) Autoracing Club Bratislava	(Slovakia) Miro Konôpka (Slovakia) Štefan Rosina	Porsche 911 GT3-RS	D	78
18	GT2	77	(Slovakia) Autoracing Club Bratislava	(Slovakia) Miro Konôpka (Slovakia) Štefan Rosina	Porsche 3.6L Flat-6	D	78
19	GT2	56	(Monaco) JMB Racing	(Netherlands) Peter Kutemann (France) Antoine Gosse	Ferrari F430 GT2	P	78
19	GT2	56	(Monaco) JMB Racing	(Netherlands) Peter Kutemann (France) Antoine Gosse	Ferrari 4.0L V8	P	78
20	GT2	71	(Spain) RSV Motorsport	(France) Michel Ligonnet (Germany) Roland Severin	Ferrari F430 GT2	MI	77
20	GT2	71	(Spain) RSV Motorsport	(France) Michel Ligonnet (Germany) Roland Severin	Ferrari 4.0L V8	MI	77
21	**G3**	**124**	**(France) Riverside**	**(France) Benjamin Dessange (France) Christian Demigneux (France) Christopher Campbell**	**Chevrolet Corvette Z06-R**	MI	**76**
21	**G3**	**124**	**(France) Riverside**	**(France) Benjamin Dessange (France) Christian Demigneux (France) Christopher Campbell**	**Chevrolet 7.0L V8**	MI	**76**
22	G3	125	(France) Riverside	(France) Stéphane Lacroix Wasover (France) Didier van Straaten (France) Franck Mechaly	Chevrolet Corvette Z06-R	MI	75
22	G3	125	(France) Riverside	(France) Stéphane Lacroix Wasover (France) Didier van Straaten (France) Franck Mechaly	Chevrolet 7.0L V8	MI	75
23 DNF	GT2	66	(Germany) Team Felbermayr-Proton	(Germany) Christian Ried (Austria) Horst Felbermayr Jr.	Porsche 911 GT3-RSR	MI	59
23 DNF	GT2	66	(Germany) Team Felbermayr-Proton	(Germany) Christian Ried (Austria) Horst Felbermayr Jr.	Porsche 3.6L Flat-6	MI	59
24 DNF	GT1	11	(United Kingdom) Balfe Motorsport	(United Kingdom) Shaun Balfe (United Kingdom) Nigel Taylor	Saleen S7-R	D	53
24 DNF	GT1	11	(United Kingdom) Balfe Motorsport	(United Kingdom) Shaun Balfe (United Kingdom) Nigel Taylor	Ford 7.0L V8	D	53
25 NC	G2	101	(Belgium) Belgian Racing	(Belgium) Bas Leinders (Belgium) Renaud Kuppens	Gillet Vertigo Streiff	D	45
25 NC	G2	101	(Belgium) Belgian Racing	(Belgium) Bas Leinders (Belgium) Renaud Kuppens	Alfa Romeo 3.6L V6	D	45
26 DNF	GT2	69	(Germany) Team Felbermayr-Proton	(Germany) Gerold Ried (Austria) Horst Felbermayr Sr.	Porsche 911 GT3-RSR	MI	44
26 DNF	GT2	69	(Germany) Team Felbermayr-Proton	(Germany) Gerold Ried (Austria) Horst Felbermayr Sr.	Porsche 3.6L Flat-6	MI	44
27 DNF	GT2	74	(Italy) Ebimotors	(Italy) Luigi Moccia (Italy) Emanuelle Busnelli	Porsche 911 GT3-RSR	P	36
27 DNF	GT2	74	(Italy) Ebimotors	(Italy) Luigi Moccia (Italy) Emanuelle Busnelli	Porsche 3.6L Flat-6	P	36
28 DNF	G3	122	(Monaco) JMB Racing	(France) Nicolas Comar (France) Philippe Rambeaud (France) Michel Mhitarian	Ferrari F430 Challenge	MI	23
28 DNF	G3	122	(Monaco) JMB Racing	(France) Nicolas Comar (France) Philippe Rambeaud (France) Michel Mhitarian	Ferrari 4.3L V8	MI	23
29 DNF	G3	123	(Monaco) JMB Racing	(Italy) Andrea Garbagnati (Argentina) Miguel Iacovacci	Ferrari F430 Challenge	MI	17
29 DNF	G3	123	(Monaco) JMB Racing	(Italy) Andrea Garbagnati (Argentina) Miguel Iacovacci	Ferrari 4.3L V8	MI	17
30 DNF	GT1	19	(France) Red Racing	(France) Olivier Porta (France) Romain Yvon	Lister Storm	D	7
30 DNF	GT1	19	(France) Red Racing	(France) Olivier Porta (France) Romain Yvon	Jaguar 7.0L V12	D	7

== Statistics ==
- Pole Position – #34 PSI Experience – 1:52.841
- Average Speed – 177.74 km/h

FIA GT Championship
Previous race: 2006 Spa 24 Hours	2006 season	Next race: 2006 FIA GT Dijon 500km
