= 2006 FIA GT Oschersleben 500km =

Layout of the Motorsport Arena Oschersleben

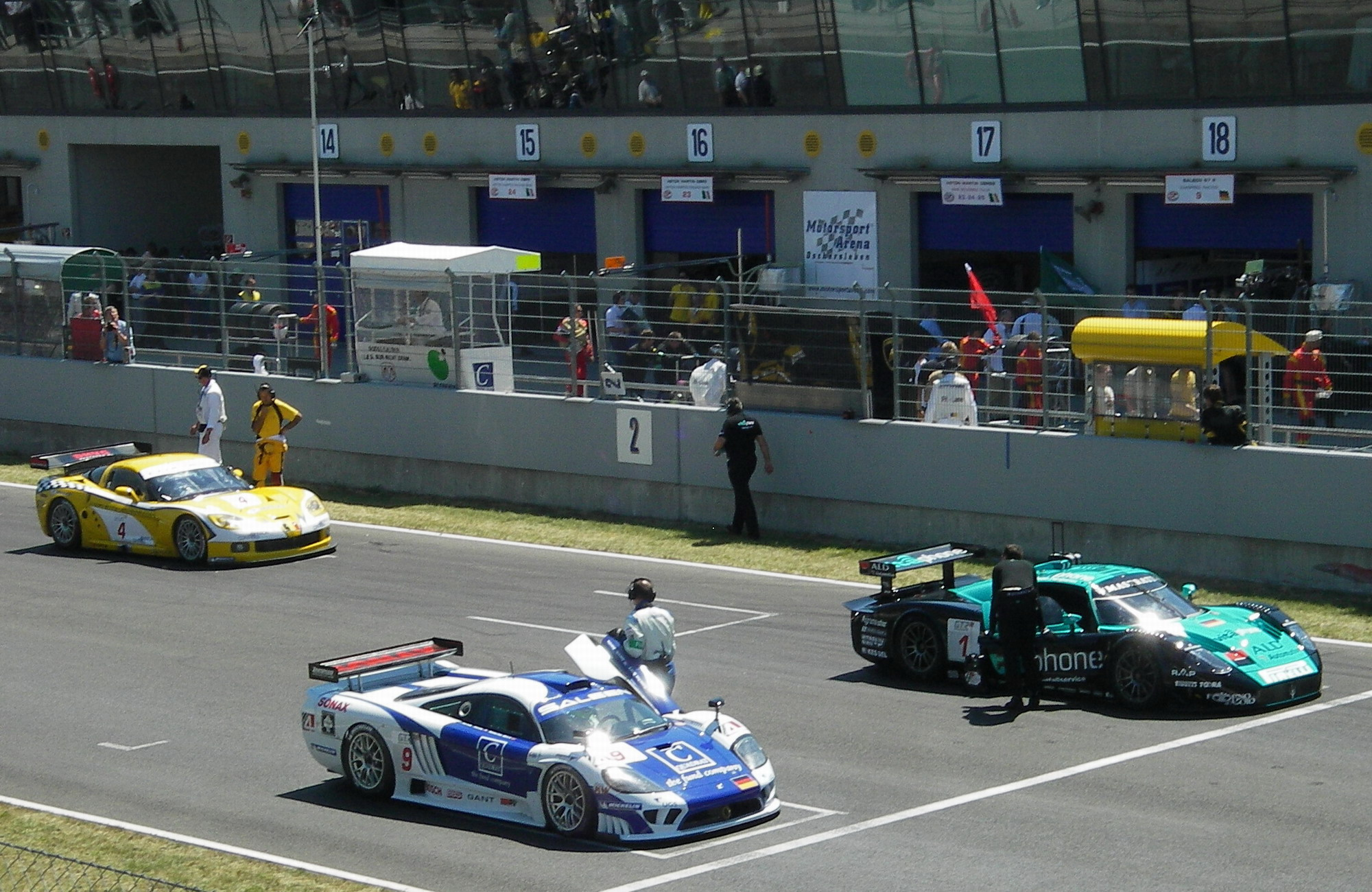
Vitaphone Racing's Maserati, Zakspeed's Saleen, and GLPK-Carsport's Corvette on the starting grid.

The 2006 FIA GT Oschersleben 500 km was the third race for the 2006 FIA GT Championship season. It took place on July 2, 2006.

== Official results ==
Class winners in bold. Cars failing to complete 70% of winner's distance marked as Not Classified (NC).

| Pos | Class | No | Team | Drivers | Chassis | Tyre | Laps |
| Pos | Class | No | Team | Drivers | Engine | Tyre | Laps |
|---|---|---|---|---|---|---|---|
| 1 | **GT1** | **1** | **(Germany) Vitaphone Racing Team** | **(Italy) Andrea Bertolini (Germany) Michael Bartels** | **Maserati MC12 GT1** | P | **125** |
| 1 | **GT1** | **1** | **(Germany) Vitaphone Racing Team** | **(Italy) Andrea Bertolini (Germany) Michael Bartels** | **Maserati 6.0L V12** | P | **125** |
| 2 | GT1 | 2 | (Germany) Vitaphone Racing Team | (Italy) Thomas Biagi (United Kingdom) Jamie Davies | Maserati MC12 GT1 | P | 125 |
| 2 | GT1 | 2 | (Germany) Vitaphone Racing Team | (Italy) Thomas Biagi (United Kingdom) Jamie Davies | Maserati 6.0L V12 | P | 125 |
| 3 | GT1 | 5 | (Germany) Phoenix Racing | (Italy) Andrea Piccini (Switzerland) Jean-Denis Délétraz | Aston Martin DBR9 | MI | 125 |
| 3 | GT1 | 5 | (Germany) Phoenix Racing | (Italy) Andrea Piccini (Switzerland) Jean-Denis Délétraz | Aston Martin 6.0L V12 | MI | 125 |
| 4 | GT1 | 9 | (Germany) Zakspeed Racing | (Czech Republic) Jaroslav Janiš (Germany) Sascha Bert | Saleen S7-R | MI | 125 |
| 4 | GT1 | 9 | (Germany) Zakspeed Racing | (Czech Republic) Jaroslav Janiš (Germany) Sascha Bert | Ford 7.0L V8 | MI | 125 |
| 5 | GT1 | 23 | (Italy) Aston Martin Racing BMS | (Italy) Fabrizio Gollin (Italy) Fabio Babini | Aston Martin DBR9 | P | 125 |
| 5 | GT1 | 23 | (Italy) Aston Martin Racing BMS | (Italy) Fabrizio Gollin (Italy) Fabio Babini | Aston Martin 6.0L V12 | P | 125 |
| 6 | GT1 | 24 | (Italy) Aston Martin Racing BMS | (Italy) Christian Pescatori (Portugal) Miguel Ramos | Aston Martin DBR9 | P | 124 |
| 6 | GT1 | 24 | (Italy) Aston Martin Racing BMS | (Italy) Christian Pescatori (Portugal) Miguel Ramos | Aston Martin 6.0L V12 | P | 124 |
| 7 | GT1 | 33 | (Austria) Race Alliance | (Austria) Karl Wendlinger (Austria) Philipp Peter | Aston Martin DBR9 | D | 124 |
| 7 | GT1 | 33 | (Austria) Race Alliance | (Austria) Karl Wendlinger (Austria) Philipp Peter | Aston Martin 6.0L V12 | D | 124 |
| 8 | GT1 | 11 | (United Kingdom) Balfe Motorsport | (United Kingdom) Jamie Derbyshire (United Kingdom) Shaun Balfe | Saleen S7-R | D | 122 |
| 8 | GT1 | 11 | (United Kingdom) Balfe Motorsport | (United Kingdom) Jamie Derbyshire (United Kingdom) Shaun Balfe | Ford 7.0L V8 | D | 122 |
| 9 | **GT2** | **62** | **(United Kingdom) Scuderia Ecosse** | **(United Kingdom) Nathan Kinch (United Kingdom) Andrew Kirkaldy** | **Ferrari F430 GT2** | MI | **121** |
| 9 | **GT2** | **62** | **(United Kingdom) Scuderia Ecosse** | **(United Kingdom) Nathan Kinch (United Kingdom) Andrew Kirkaldy** | **Ferrari 4.0L V8** | MI | **121** |
| 10 | GT2 | 59 | (Italy) AF Corse | (Finland) Mika Salo (Portugal) Rui Águas | Ferrari F430 GT2 | P | 120 |
| 10 | GT2 | 59 | (Italy) AF Corse | (Finland) Mika Salo (Portugal) Rui Águas | Ferrari 4.0L V8 | P | 120 |
| 11 | GT2 | 63 | (United Kingdom) Scuderia Ecosse | (United Kingdom) Tim Mullen (Canada) Chris Niarchos | Ferrari F430 GT2 | MI | 119 |
| 11 | GT2 | 63 | (United Kingdom) Scuderia Ecosse | (United Kingdom) Tim Mullen (Canada) Chris Niarchos | Ferrari 4.0L V8 | MI | 119 |
| 12 | GT2 | 55 | (Monaco) JMB Racing | (United Kingdom) Tim Sugden (Switzerland) Iradj Alexander | Ferrari F430 GT | P | 119 |
| 12 | GT2 | 55 | (Monaco) JMB Racing | (United Kingdom) Tim Sugden (Switzerland) Iradj Alexander | Ferrari 4.0L V8 | P | 119 |
| 13 | GT2 | 75 | (Italy) Ebimotors | (France) Emmanuel Collard (Italy) Luca Riccitelli | Porsche 911 GT3-RSR | P | 119 |
| 13 | GT2 | 75 | (Italy) Ebimotors | (France) Emmanuel Collard (Italy) Luca Riccitelli | Porsche 3.6L Flat-6 | P | 119 |
| 14 | GT2 | 58 | (Italy) AF Corse | (Brazil) Jaime Melo (Italy) Matteo Bobbi | Ferrari F430 GT2 | P | 118 |
| 14 | GT2 | 58 | (Italy) AF Corse | (Brazil) Jaime Melo (Italy) Matteo Bobbi | Porsche 3.6L Flat-6 | P | 118 |
| 15 | GT2 | 66 | (Germany) Team Felbermayr-Proton | (Germany) Christian Reid (Austria) Horst Felbermayr Jr. | Porsche 911 GT3-RSR | MI | 118 |
| 15 | GT2 | 66 | (Germany) Team Felbermayr-Proton | (Germany) Christian Reid (Austria) Horst Felbermayr Jr. | Porsche 3.6L Flat-6 | MI | 118 |
| 16 | GT2 | 74 | (Italy) Ebimotors | (Italy) Luigi Moccia (Italy) Emanuele Busnelli | Porsche 911 GT3 | P | 116 |
| 16 | GT2 | 74 | (Italy) Ebimotors | (Italy) Luigi Moccia (Italy) Emanuele Busnelli | Porsche 3.6L Flat-6 | P | 116 |
| 17 | GT2 | 69 | (Germany) Team Felbermayr-Proton | (Germany) Gerold Reid (Austria) Horst Felbermayr Sr. | Porsche 911 GT3-RSR | MI | 113 |
| 17 | GT2 | 69 | (Germany) Team Felbermayr-Proton | (Germany) Gerold Reid (Austria) Horst Felbermayr Sr. | Porsche 3.6L Flat-6 | MI | 113 |
| 18 | GT2 | 56 | (Monaco) JMB Racing | (Netherlands) Peter Kutemann (France) Antoine Gosse | Ferrari F430 GT2 | P | 111 |
| 18 | GT2 | 56 | (Monaco) JMB Racing | (Netherlands) Peter Kutemann (France) Antoine Gosse | Ferrari 4.0L V8 | P | 111 |
| 19 | GT1 | 13 | (Germany) B-Racing RS Line Team | (France) Christophe Bouchut (Italy) Michele Bartyan | Lamborghini Murciélago R-GT | D | 88 |
| 19 | GT1 | 13 | (Germany) B-Racing RS Line Team | (France) Christophe Bouchut (Italy) Michele Bartyan | Lamborghini 6.0L V12 | D | 88 |
| 20 DNF | GT2 | 77 | (Slovakia) Autoracing Club Bratislava | (Slovakia) Miro Konopka (Slovakia) Štefan Rosina | Porsche 911 GT3-RS | D | 85 |
| 20 DNF | GT2 | 77 | (Slovakia) Autoracing Club Bratislava | (Slovakia) Miro Konopka (Slovakia) Štefan Rosina | Porsche 3.6L Flat-6 | D | 85 |
| 21 DNF | GT2 | 99 | (Austria) Race Alliance | (Austria) Lukas Lichtner-Hoyer (Austria) Thomas Gruber | Porsche 911 GT3-RSR | D | 79 |
| 21 DNF | GT2 | 99 | (Austria) Race Alliance | (Austria) Lukas Lichtner-Hoyer (Austria) Thomas Gruber | Porsche 3.6L Flat-6 | D | 79 |
| 22 DNF | GT2 | 52 | (Austria) Renauer Motorsport Team | (Germany) Wolfgang Kaufmann (Italy) Luca Moro | Porsche 911 GT3-RSR | D | 64 |
| 22 DNF | GT2 | 52 | (Austria) Renauer Motorsport Team | (Germany) Wolfgang Kaufmann (Italy) Luca Moro | Porsche 3.6L Flat-6 | D | 64 |
| 23 DNF | GT1 | 4 | (Belgium) GLPK-Carsport | (Netherlands) Mike Hezemans (Belgium) Bert Longin (Belgium) Anthony Kumpen | Chevrolet Corvette C6.R | MI | 29 |
| 23 DNF | GT1 | 4 | (Belgium) GLPK-Carsport | (Netherlands) Mike Hezemans (Belgium) Bert Longin (Belgium) Anthony Kumpen | Chevrolet 7.0L V8 | MI | 29 |
| 24 DNF | G2 | 101 | (Belgium) Belgian Racing | (Belgium) Bas Leinders (Belgium) Renaud Kuppens | Gillet Vertigo Streiff | D | 24 |
| 24 DNF | G2 | 101 | (Belgium) Belgian Racing | (Belgium) Bas Leinders (Belgium) Renaud Kuppens | Alfa Romeo 3.6L V6 | D | 24 |

== Statistics ==
- Pole Position – #1 Vitaphone Racing Team – 1:21.520
- Average Speed – 151.72 km/h

FIA GT Championship
| Previous race: 2006 FIA GT Brno 500km | 2006 season | Next race: 2006 Spa 24 Hours |
