= 2006 FIA GT Mugello 500km =

Layout of the Mugello Circuit

The 2006 FIA GT Mugello 500 km was the seventh race for the 2006 FIA GT Championship season. It took place on September 17, 2006.

== Official results ==
Class winners in bold. Cars failing to complete 70% of winner's distance marked as Not Classified (NC).

Pos	Class	No	Team	Drivers	Chassis	Tyre	Laps
Pos	Class	No	Team	Drivers	Engine	Tyre	Laps
1	**GT1**	**33**	**(Austria) Race Alliance**	**(Austria) Karl Wendlinger (Austria) Philipp Peter**	**Aston Martin DBR9**	D	**86**
1	**GT1**	**33**	**(Austria) Race Alliance**	**(Austria) Karl Wendlinger (Austria) Philipp Peter**	**Aston Martin 6.0L V12**	D	**86**
2	GT1	1	(Germany) Vitaphone Racing Team	(Germany) Michael Bartels (Italy) Andrea Bertolini	Maserati MC12 GT1	P	86
2	GT1	1	(Germany) Vitaphone Racing Team	(Germany) Michael Bartels (Italy) Andrea Bertolini	Maserati 6.0L V12	P	86
3	GT1	2	(Germany) Vitaphone Racing Team	(Italy) Thomas Biagi (United Kingdom) Jamie Davies	Maserati MC12 GT1	P	86
3	GT1	2	(Germany) Vitaphone Racing Team	(Italy) Thomas Biagi (United Kingdom) Jamie Davies	Maserati 6.0L V12	P	86
4	GT1	9	(Germany) Zakspeed Racing	(Czech Republic) Jaroslav Janiš (Germany) Sascha Bert (Italy) Andrea Montermini	Saleen S7-R	MI	86
4	GT1	9	(Germany) Zakspeed Racing	(Czech Republic) Jaroslav Janiš (Germany) Sascha Bert (Italy) Andrea Montermini	Ford 7.0L V8	MI	86
5	GT1	23	(Italy) Aston Martin Racing BMS	(Italy) Christian Pescatori (Italy) Fabio Babini	Aston Martin DBR9	P	86
5	GT1	23	(Italy) Aston Martin Racing BMS	(Italy) Christian Pescatori (Italy) Fabio Babini	Aston Martin 6.0L V12	P	86
6	GT1	5	(Germany) Phoenix Racing	(Switzerland) Jean-Denis Délétraz (Italy) Andrea Piccini	Aston Martin DBR9	MI	86
6	GT1	5	(Germany) Phoenix Racing	(Switzerland) Jean-Denis Délétraz (Italy) Andrea Piccini	Aston Martin 6.0L V12	MI	86
7	GT1	4	(Belgium) GLPK-Carsport	(Netherlands) Mike Hezemans (Belgium) Bert Longin (Belgium) Anthony Kumpen	Chevrolet Corvette C6.R	MI	86
7	GT1	4	(Belgium) GLPK-Carsport	(Netherlands) Mike Hezemans (Belgium) Bert Longin (Belgium) Anthony Kumpen	Chevrolet 7.0L V8	MI	86
8	**GT2**	**75**	**(Italy) Ebimotors**	**(France) Emmanuel Collard (Italy) Luca Riccitelli**	**Porsche 911 GT3-RSR**	P	**83**
8	**GT2**	**75**	**(Italy) Ebimotors**	**(France) Emmanuel Collard (Italy) Luca Riccitelli**	**Porsche 3.6L Flat-6**	P	**83**
9	GT2	58	(Italy) AF Corse	(Brazil) Jaime Melo (Italy) Matteo Bobbi	Ferrari F430 GT2	P	83
9	GT2	58	(Italy) AF Corse	(Brazil) Jaime Melo (Italy) Matteo Bobbi	Ferrari 4.0L V8	P	83
10	GT2	55	(Monaco) JMB Racing	(United Kingdom) Tim Sugden (Switzerland) Iradj Alexander	Ferrari F430 GT2	P	82
10	GT2	55	(Monaco) JMB Racing	(United Kingdom) Tim Sugden (Switzerland) Iradj Alexander	Ferrari 4.0L V8	P	82
11	GT2	59	(Italy) AF Corse	(Finland) Mika Salo (Portugal) Rui Águas	Ferrari F430 GT2	P	82
11	GT2	59	(Italy) AF Corse	(Finland) Mika Salo (Portugal) Rui Águas	Ferrari 4.0L V8	P	82
12	GT2	63	(United Kingdom) Scuderia Ecosse	(United Kingdom) Tim Mullen (Canada) Chris Niarchos	Ferrari F430 GT2	MI	81
12	GT2	63	(United Kingdom) Scuderia Ecosse	(United Kingdom) Tim Mullen (Canada) Chris Niarchos	Ferrari 4.0L V8	MI	81
13	GT1	11	(United Kingdom) Balfe Motorsport	(United Kingdom) Shaun Balfe (United Kingdom) Nigel Taylor	Saleen S7-R	D	81
13	GT1	11	(United Kingdom) Balfe Motorsport	(United Kingdom) Shaun Balfe (United Kingdom) Nigel Taylor	Ford 7.0L V8	D	81
14	GT2	66	(Germany) Team Felbermayr-Proton	(Germany) Christian Reid (Austria) Horst Felbermayr Jr.	Porsche 911 GT3-RSR	MI	80
14	GT2	66	(Germany) Team Felbermayr-Proton	(Germany) Christian Reid (Austria) Horst Felbermayr Jr.	Porsche 3.6L Flat-6	MI	80
15	GT2	74	(Italy) Ebimotors	(Italy) Luigi Moccia (Italy) Emanuele Busnelli	Porsche 911 GT3-RSR	P	79
15	GT2	74	(Italy) Ebimotors	(Italy) Luigi Moccia (Italy) Emanuele Busnelli	Porsche 3.6L Flat-6	P	79
16	**G2**	**101**	**(Belgium) Belgian Racing**	**(Belgium) Bas Leinders (Belgium) Renaud Kuppens**	**Gillet Vertigo Streiff**	D	**78**
16	**G2**	**101**	**(Belgium) Belgian Racing**	**(Belgium) Bas Leinders (Belgium) Renaud Kuppens**	**Alfa Romeo 3.6L V6**	D	**78**
17	GT2	77	(Slovakia) Autoracing Club Bratislava	(Slovakia) Miro Konopka (Slovakia) Štefan Rosina	Porsche 911 GT3-RS	D	77
17	GT2	77	(Slovakia) Autoracing Club Bratislava	(Slovakia) Miro Konopka (Slovakia) Štefan Rosina	Porsche 3.6L Flat-6	D	77
18	GT2	56	(Monaco) JMB Racing	(Netherlands) Peter Kutemann (France) Antoine Gosse	Ferrari F430 GT2	P	77
18	GT2	56	(Monaco) JMB Racing	(Netherlands) Peter Kutemann (France) Antoine Gosse	Ferrari 4.0L V8	P	77
19 DNF	GT1	38	(Germany) All-Inkl.com Racing	(France) Christophe Bouchut (Switzerland) Benjamin Leuenberger	Lamborghini Murciélago R-GT	D	49
19 DNF	GT1	38	(Germany) All-Inkl.com Racing	(France) Christophe Bouchut (Switzerland) Benjamin Leuenberger	Lamborghini 6.0L V12	D	49
20 DNF	GT1	40	(Italy) Scuderia Playteam	(Italy) Giambattista Giannoccaro (Italy) Alessandro Pier Guidi (Finland) Toni Vilander	Maserati MC12 GT1	P	35
20 DNF	GT1	40	(Italy) Scuderia Playteam	(Italy) Giambattista Giannoccaro (Italy) Alessandro Pier Guidi (Finland) Toni Vilander	Maserati 6.0L V12	P	35
21 DNF	GT2	69	(Germany) Team Felbermayr-Proton	(Germany) Gerold Reid (Austria) Horst Felbermayr sr.	Porsche 911 GT3-RS	MI	32
21 DNF	GT2	69	(Germany) Team Felbermayr-Proton	(Germany) Gerold Reid (Austria) Horst Felbermayr sr.	Porsche 3.6L Flat-6	MI	32
22 DNF	GT1	24	(Italy) Aston Martin Racing BMS	(Italy) Fabrizio Gollin (Portugal) Miguel Ramos	Aston Martin DBR9	P	4
22 DNF	GT1	24	(Italy) Aston Martin Racing BMS	(Italy) Fabrizio Gollin (Portugal) Miguel Ramos	Aston Martin 6.0L V12	P	4
23 DNF	GT2	99	(Austria) Race Alliance	(Austria) Thomas Gruber (Austria) Lukas Lichtner-Hoyer	Porsche 911 GT3-RSR	D	1
23 DNF	GT2	99	(Austria) Race Alliance	(Austria) Thomas Gruber (Austria) Lukas Lichtner-Hoyer	Porsche 3.6L Flat-6	D	1
24 DNF	GT2	62	(United Kingdom) Scuderia Ecosse	(United Kingdom) Nathan Kinch (United Kingdom) Andrew Kirkaldy	Ferrari F430 GT2	MI	0
24 DNF	GT2	62	(United Kingdom) Scuderia Ecosse	(United Kingdom) Nathan Kinch (United Kingdom) Andrew Kirkaldy	Ferrari 4.0L V8	MI	0

== Statistics ==
- Pole Position – #1 Vitaphone Racing Team – 1:48.436
- Average Speed – 149.74 km/h

FIA GT Championship
Previous race: 2006 FIA GT Dijon 500km	2006 season	Next race: 2006 FIA GT Budapest 500km
