= 2006 FIA GT Brno 500km =

Layout of the Brno Circuit

The 2006 FIA GT Brno 500 km was the second race for the 2006 FIA GT Championship season. It took place on May 28, 2006.

== Official results ==
Class winners in bold. Cars failing to complete 70% of winner's distance marked as Not Classified (NC).

Pos	Class	No	Team	Drivers	Chassis	Tyre	Laps
Pos	Class	No	Team	Drivers	Engine	Tyre	Laps
1	**GT1**	**9**	**(Germany) Zakspeed Racing**	**(Czech Republic) Jaroslav Janiš (Germany) Sascha Bert**	**Saleen S7-R**	MI	**88**
1	**GT1**	**9**	**(Germany) Zakspeed Racing**	**(Czech Republic) Jaroslav Janiš (Germany) Sascha Bert**	**Ford 7.0L V8**	MI	**88**
2	GT1	5	(Germany) Phoenix Racing	(Italy) Andrea Piccini (Switzerland) Jean-Denis Délétraz	Aston Martin DBR9	MI	88
2	GT1	5	(Germany) Phoenix Racing	(Italy) Andrea Piccini (Switzerland) Jean-Denis Délétraz	Aston Martin 6.0L V12	MI	88
3	GT1	23	(Italy) Aston Martin Racing BMS	(Italy) Fabrizio Gollin (Italy) Fabio Babini	Aston Martin DBR9	P	88
3	GT1	23	(Italy) Aston Martin Racing BMS	(Italy) Fabrizio Gollin (Italy) Fabio Babini	Aston Martin 6.0L V12	P	88
4	GT1	1	(Germany) Vitaphone Racing Team	(Italy) Andrea Bertolini (Germany) Michael Bartels	Maserati MC12 GT1	P	88
4	GT1	1	(Germany) Vitaphone Racing Team	(Italy) Andrea Bertolini (Germany) Michael Bartels	Maserati 6.0L V12	P	88
5	GT1	24	(Italy) Aston Martin Racing BMS	(Italy) Christian Pescatori (Portugal) Miguel Ramos	Aston Martin DBR9	P	88
5	GT1	24	(Italy) Aston Martin Racing BMS	(Italy) Christian Pescatori (Portugal) Miguel Ramos	Aston Martin 6.0L V12	P	88
6	GT1	13	(Germany) B-Racing RS Line Team	(France) Christophe Bouchut (Netherlands) Peter Kox	Lamborghini Murcielago R-GT	D	87
6	GT1	13	(Germany) B-Racing RS Line Team	(France) Christophe Bouchut (Netherlands) Peter Kox	Lamborghini 6.0L V12	D	87
7	GT1	2	(Germany) Vitaphone Racing Team	(Italy) Thomas Biagi (United Kingdom) Jamie Davies	Maserati MC12 GT1	P	87
7	GT1	2	(Germany) Vitaphone Racing Team	(Italy) Thomas Biagi (United Kingdom) Jamie Davies	Maserati 6.0L V12	P	87
8	**GT2**	**55**	**(Monaco) JMB Racing**	**(United Kingdom) Tim Sugden (Switzerland) Iradj Alexander**	**Ferrari F430 GT2**	P	**84**
8	**GT2**	**55**	**(Monaco) JMB Racing**	**(United Kingdom) Tim Sugden (Switzerland) Iradj Alexander**	**Ferrari 4.0L V8**	P	**84**
9	GT2	75	(Italy) Ebimotors	(France) Emmanuel Collard (Italy) Luca Riccitelli	Porsche 911 GT3-RSR	P	84
9	GT2	75	(Italy) Ebimotors	(France) Emmanuel Collard (Italy) Luca Riccitelli	Porsche 3.6L Flat-6	P	84
10	GT2	58	(Italy) AF Corse	(Brazil) Jaime Melo (Italy) Matteo Bobbi	Ferrari F430 GT2	P	84
10	GT2	58	(Italy) AF Corse	(Brazil) Jaime Melo (Italy) Matteo Bobbi	Ferrari 4.0L V8	P	84
11	GT2	63	(United Kingdom) Scuderia Ecosse	(United Kingdom) Tim Mullen (United Kingdom) Phil Bennett	Ferrari F430 GT2	MI	84
11	GT2	63	(United Kingdom) Scuderia Ecosse	(United Kingdom) Tim Mullen (United Kingdom) Phil Bennett	Ferrari 4.0L V8	MI	84
12	GT2	74	(Italy) Ebimotors	(Italy) Luigi Moccia (Italy) Emanuele Busnelli	Porsche 911 GT3-RSR	P	83
12	GT2	74	(Italy) Ebimotors	(Italy) Luigi Moccia (Italy) Emanuele Busnelli	Porsche 3.6L Flat-6	P	83
13	GT2	59	(Italy) AF Corse	(Finland) Mika Salo (Portugal) Rui Águas	Ferrari F430 GT2	P	83
13	GT2	59	(Italy) AF Corse	(Finland) Mika Salo (Portugal) Rui Águas	Ferrari 4.0L V8	P	83
14	GT1	4	(Belgium) GLPK-Carsport	(Netherlands) Mike Hezemans (Belgium) Bert Longin (Belgium) Anthony Kumpen	Chevrolet Corvette C6.R	MI	81
14	GT1	4	(Belgium) GLPK-Carsport	(Netherlands) Mike Hezemans (Belgium) Bert Longin (Belgium) Anthony Kumpen	Chevrolet 7.0L V8	MI	81
15	GT2	66	(Germany) Team Felbermayr-Proton	(Germany) Christian Reid (Austria) Horst Felbermayr Jr.	Porsche 911 GT3-RSR	MI	81
15	GT2	66	(Germany) Team Felbermayr-Proton	(Germany) Christian Reid (Austria) Horst Felbermayr Jr.	Porsche 3.6L Flat-6	MI	81
16	GT2	56	(Monaco) JMB Racing	(Netherlands) Peter Kutemann (France) Antoine Gosse	Ferrari F430 GT2	P	81
16	GT2	56	(Monaco) JMB Racing	(Netherlands) Peter Kutemann (France) Antoine Gosse	Ferrari 4.0L V8	P	81
17	GT2	99	(Austria) Race Alliance	(Austria) Lukas Lichtner-Hoyer (Austria) Thomas Gruber	Porsche 911 GT3-RSR	D	81
17	GT2	99	(Austria) Race Alliance	(Austria) Lukas Lichtner-Hoyer (Austria) Thomas Gruber	Porsche 3.6L Flat-6	D	81
18	GT2	69	(Germany) Team Felbermayr-Proton	(Germany) Gerold Reid (Austria) Horst Felbermayr Sr.	Porsche 911 GT3-RSR	MI	80
18	GT2	69	(Germany) Team Felbermayr-Proton	(Germany) Gerold Reid (Austria) Horst Felbermayr Sr.	Porsche 3.6L Flat-6	MI	80
19	GT2	77	(Slovakia) Autoracing Club Bratislava	(Slovakia) Miro Konopka (Slovakia) Štefan Rosina	Porsche 911 GT3-RS	D	80
19	GT2	77	(Slovakia) Autoracing Club Bratislava	(Slovakia) Miro Konopka (Slovakia) Štefan Rosina	Porsche 3.6L Flat-6	D	80
20	GT2	62	(United Kingdom) Scuderia Ecosse	(United Kingdom) Nathan Kinch (United Kingdom) Andrew Kirkaldy	Ferrari F430 GT2	MI	79
20	GT2	62	(United Kingdom) Scuderia Ecosse	(United Kingdom) Nathan Kinch (United Kingdom) Andrew Kirkaldy	Ferrari 4.0L V8	MI	79
21	GT2	52	(Austria) Renauer Motorsport Team	(Germany) Wolfgang Kaufmann (Italy) Luca Moro	Porsche 911 GT3-RSR	D	79
21	GT2	52	(Austria) Renauer Motorsport Team	(Germany) Wolfgang Kaufmann (Italy) Luca Moro	Ferrari 4.0L V8	D	79
22	GT2	53	(Austria) Renauer Motorsport Team	(Austria) Manfred Jurasz (Austria) Hans Knauss (Czech Republic) Pétr Valek	Porsche 911 GT3-RSR	D	67
22	GT2	53	(Austria) Renauer Motorsport Team	(Austria) Manfred Jurasz (Austria) Hans Knauss (Czech Republic) Pétr Valek	Porsche 3.6L Flat-6	D	67
23 NC	G2	101	(Belgium) Belgian Racing	(Belgium) Bas Leinders (Belgium) Renaud Kuppens	Gillet Vertigo Streiff	D	41
23 NC	G2	101	(Belgium) Belgian Racing	(Belgium) Bas Leinders (Belgium) Renaud Kuppens	Alfa Romeo 3.6L V6	D	41
24 DNF	GT1	11	(United Kingdom) Balfe Motorsport	(United Kingdom) Jamie Derbyshire (United Kingdom) Shaun Balfe	Saleen S7-R	D	53
24 DNF	GT1	11	(United Kingdom) Balfe Motorsport	(United Kingdom) Jamie Derbyshire (United Kingdom) Shaun Balfe	Ford 7.0L V8	D	53
25 DNF	GT1	33	(Austria) Race Alliance	(Austria) Karl Wendlinger (Austria) Philipp Peter	Aston Martin DBR9	D	41
25 DNF	GT1	33	(Austria) Race Alliance	(Austria) Karl Wendlinger (Austria) Philipp Peter	Aston Martin 6.0L V12	D	41
26 DNS	GT2	54	(Czech Republic) Vonka Racing	(Czech Republic) Jan Vonka (Switzerland) Daniel Model	Porsche 911 GT3-R	MI	0
26 DNS	GT2	54	(Czech Republic) Vonka Racing	(Czech Republic) Jan Vonka (Switzerland) Daniel Model	Porsche 3.6L Flat-6	MI	0

== Statistics ==
- Pole Position – #9 Zakspeed Racing – 1:55.660
- Average Speed – 158.15 km/h

FIA GT Championship
Previous race: 2006 FIA GT Tourist Trophy	2006 season	Next race: 2006 FIA GT Oschersleben 500km
