= Iradj Alexander =

Swiss racing driver (born 1975)

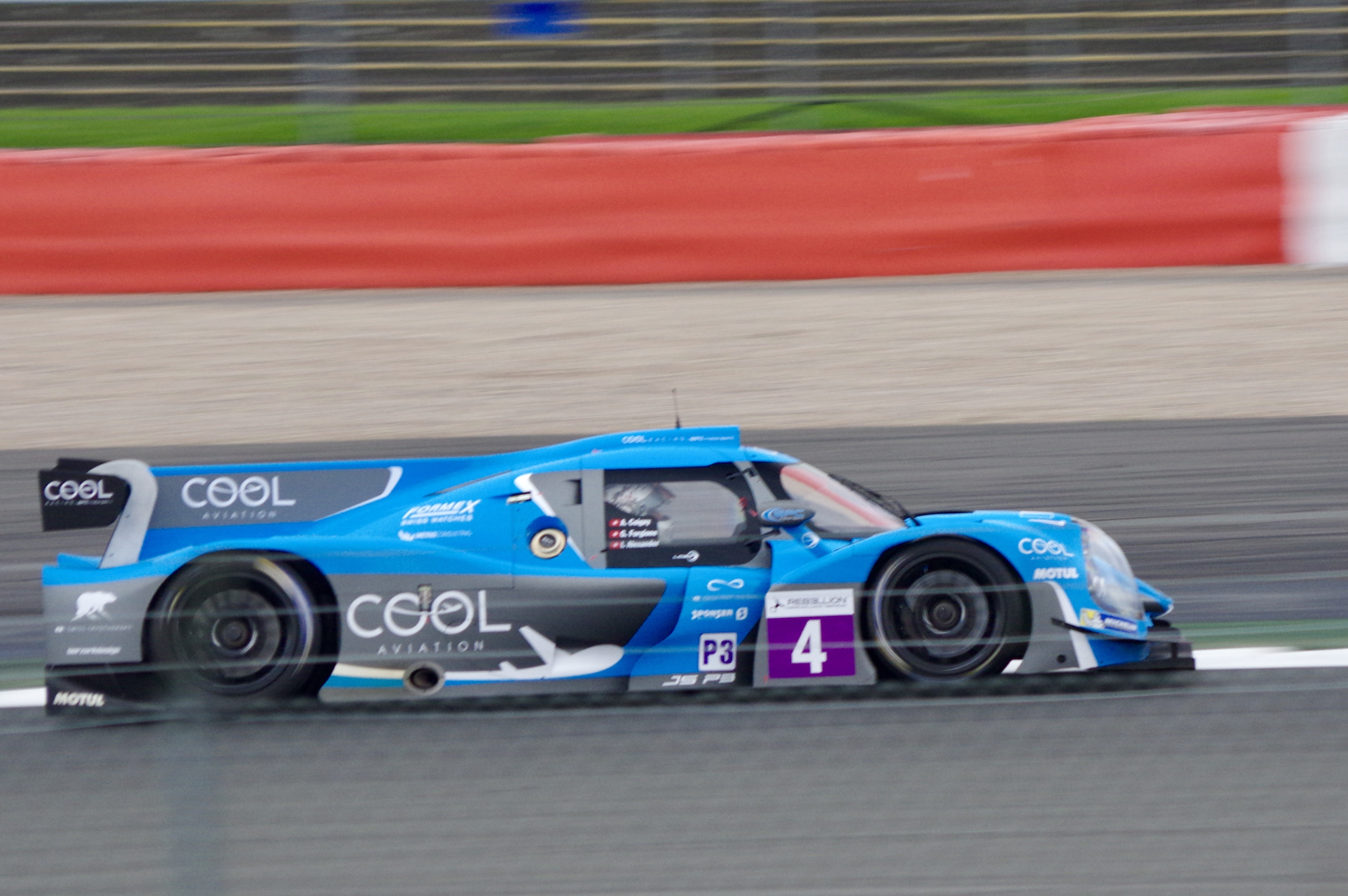
- Alexander racing a Cool Racing LMP3 in 2017
- Nationality: (Switzerland) Swiss
- Born: Iradj Alexander-David; 17 September 1975 (age 51) Locarno, Switzerland
- Categorisation: FIA Silver (until 2019); FIA Bronze (2024–)

Iradj Alexander-David (born September 17, 1975 in Locarno) is a Swiss racing driver.

From 2001 until 2004, Alexander competed in the FIA GT Championship for JMB Ferrari, although 2002 was his only full season. He also competed in the American Le Mans Series (2003), French GT Championship (2001) and Barber Dodge Pro Series (1999). In 1996, he won his only championship, coming out on top in Swiss Formula Ford.

In 2007 Alexander raced in the Le Mans Series, engaged by the new team Swiss Spirit. Alexander joined Jean-Denis Delétraz and Marcel Fässler in Monza.

Alexander fulfills Lola B07 Audi's search to represent each linguistic area of Switzerland.

== Complete motorsports results ==
=== American Open-Wheel racing results ===
(key) (Races in bold indicate pole position, races in italics indicate fastest race lap)

==== Barber Dodge Pro Series ====
Year	1	2	3	4	5	6	7	8	9	10	11	12	Rank	Points
1998	SEB	LRP	DET	WGI	CLE	GRA	MOH	ROA	LS1	ATL; 7	HMS; 21	LS2; 19	**30th**	**9**
1999	SEB; 27	NAZ; 12	LRP; 17	POR; 20	CLE; 2	ROA; 19	DET; 2	MOH; 6	GRA; 18	LS; 4	HMS; 5	WGI	**11th**	**69**

=== 24 Hours of Le Mans results ===
Year	Team	Co-Drivers	Car	Class	Laps	Pos.	Class Pos.
2007	(Switzerland) Swiss Spirit	(Switzerland) Marcel Fässler (Switzerland) Jean-Denis Delétraz	Lola B07/18-Audi	LMP1	62	DNF	DNF
2008	(Switzerland) Speedy Racing Team	(Switzerland) Andrea Chiesa (Switzerland) Benjamin Leuenberger	Spyker C8 Laviolette GT2-R	GT2	72	DNF	DNF
