= 2005 FIA GT Championship =

European motor racing season

Seasons
- ← 2004 2006 →

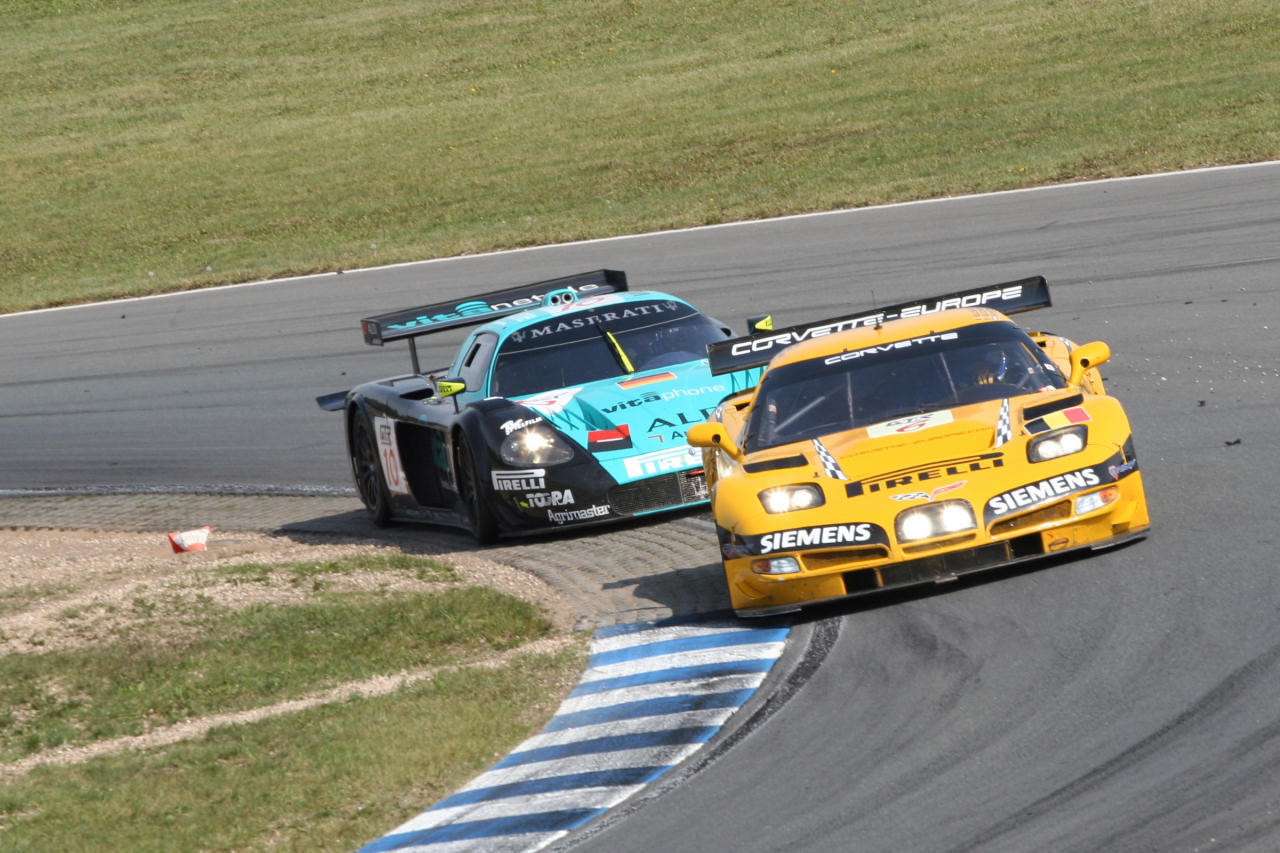
A GLPK-Carsport Corvette C5-R leads a Vitaphone Racing Team Maserati MC12 at the Oschersleben round of the 2005 FIA GT Championship

The 2005 FIA GT Championship season was the 9th season of FIA GT Championship motor racing. It featured a series of races for GT1 Grand Touring and GT2 Series Grand Touring cars, the former more powerful and highly developed and the latter remaining closer to the production models on which they were based. Additionally cars from National Championships (Group 2) and from Single-make Cups (Group 3) were permitted to participate in championship races but could not score points towards the various awards. The championship itself consisted of a GT1 Championship for Drivers, a GT1 Championship for Teams, a GT2 Cup for Drivers and a GT2 Cup for Teams. A Manufacturers Cup was also awarded in both classes. The championship season began on 10 April 2005 and ended on 25 November 2005 after 11 races.

== Schedule ==
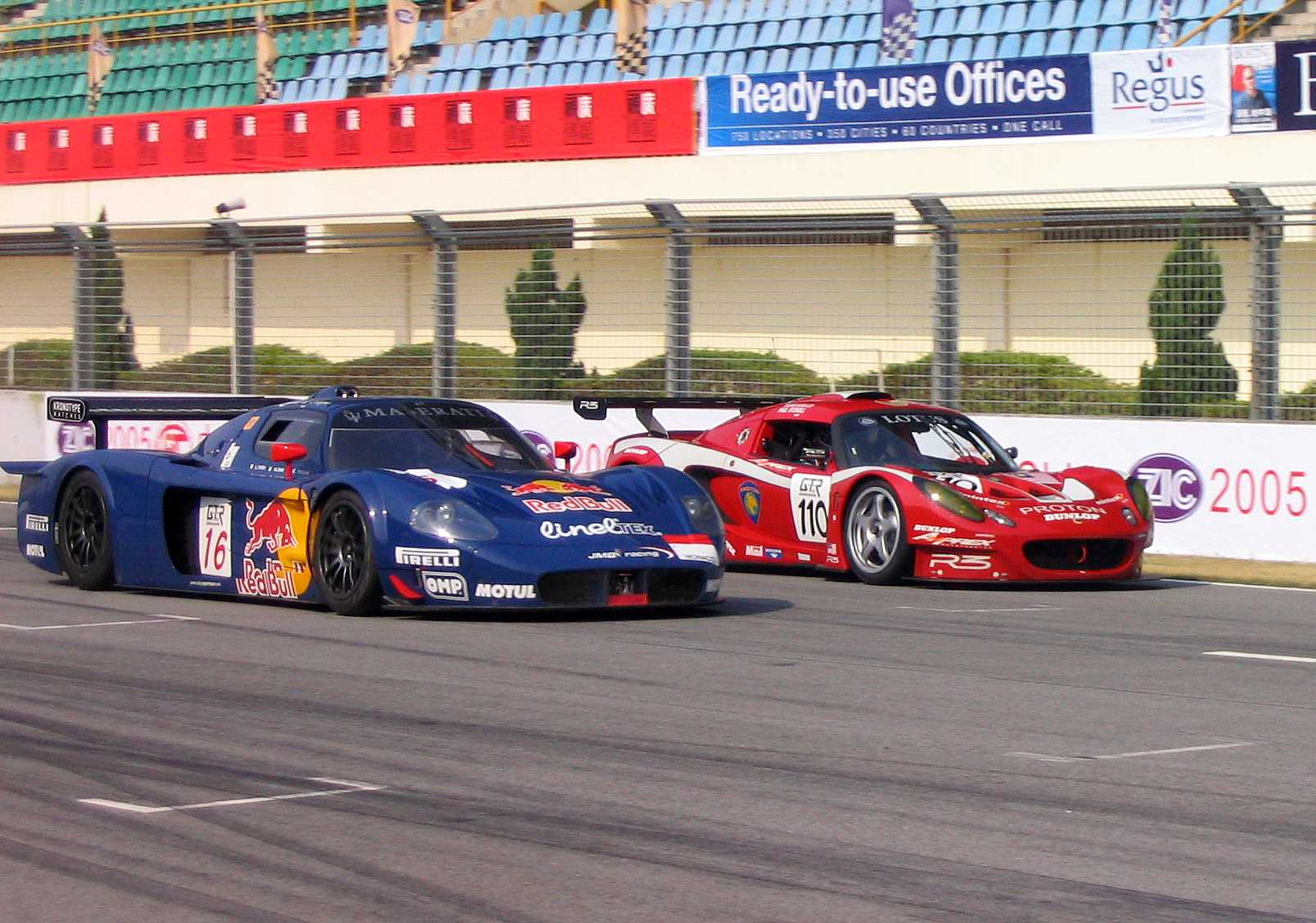
A JMB Racing Maserati MC12 and an Amprez Motorsports Lotus Exige at the Zhuhai round of the 2005 FIA GT Championship

Rnd	Race	Circuit	Date
1	(Italy) Monza Supercar 500	Autodromo Nazionale Monza	10 April
2	(France) Magny-Cours Supercar 500	Circuit de Nevers Magny-Cours	1 May
3	(United Kingdom) RAC Tourist Trophy	Silverstone Circuit	15 May
4	(Italy) Imola Supercar 500	Autodromo Enzo e Dino Ferrari	29 May
5	(Czech Republic) Brno Supercar 500	Autodrom Brno Masaryk	26 June
6	(Belgium) Proximus Spa 24 Hours	Circuit de Spa-Francorchamps	30 July; 31 July
7	(Germany) Oschersleben Supercar 500	Motorsport Arena Oschersleben	28 August
8	(Turkey) Istanbul 2 Hours	Istanbul Racing Circuit	18 September
9	(China) Zhuhai Supercar 500	Zhuhai International Circuit	23 October
10	(United Arab Emirates) Motorcity GT 500	Dubai Autodrome	18 November
11	Bahrain Supercar 500	Bahrain International Circuit	25 November

== Entries ==
=== GT1 ===
Entrant	Car	Engine	Tyre	No.	Drivers	Rounds
(Italy) GPC Sport	Ferrari 575 GTC Evo 2005	Ferrari F133 GT 6.0 L V12	P	2	(Italy) Andrea Piccini	All
(Italy) GPC Sport	Ferrari 575 GTC Evo 2005	Ferrari F133 GT 6.0 L V12	P	2	(Switzerland) Jean-Denis Délétraz	All
(Italy) GPC Sport	Ferrari 575 GTC Evo 2005	Ferrari F133 GT 6.0 L V12	P	2	(Brazil) Jaime Melo	6
(Italy) GPC Sport	Ferrari 575 GTC Evo 2005	Ferrari F133 GT 6.0 L V12	P	2	(Italy) Gianni Morbidelli	6
(Italy) GPC Sport	Ferrari 575 GTC Evo 2005	Ferrari F133 GT 6.0 L V12	P	2	(Belgium) Stéphane Lémeret	10
(Italy) GPC Sport	Ferrari 575 GTC Evo 2005	Ferrari F133 GT 6.0 L V12	P	3	(France) Jean-Philippe Belloc	1, 3–7
(Italy) GPC Sport	Ferrari 575 GTC Evo 2005	Ferrari F133 GT 6.0 L V12	P	3	(Brazil) Jaime Melo	1, 3–5, 7
(Italy) GPC Sport	Ferrari 575 GTC Evo 2005	Ferrari F133 GT 6.0 L V12	P	3	(Belgium) Stéphane Lémeret	6
(Italy) GPC Sport	Ferrari 575 GTC Evo 2005	Ferrari F133 GT 6.0 L V12	P	3	(Belgium) Loïc Deman	6
(Italy) GPC Sport	Ferrari 575 GTC Evo 2005	Ferrari F133 GT 6.0 L V12	P	3	(Italy) Stefano Livio	6
(Italy) GPC Sport	Ferrari 575 GTC Evo 2005	Ferrari F133 GT 6.0 L V12	P	3	(Italy) Marco Cioci	10–11
(Italy) GPC Sport	Ferrari 575 GTC Evo 2005	Ferrari F133 GT 6.0 L V12	P	3	(Italy) Andrea Montermini	10–11
(Germany) Konrad Motorsport	Saleen S7-R	Ford 6.9 L V8	P	4	(Germany) Harald Becker	1–2, 4
(Germany) Konrad Motorsport	Saleen S7-R	Ford 6.9 L V8	P	4	(United Kingdom) Bobby Verdon-Roe	1
(Germany) Konrad Motorsport	Saleen S7-R	Ford 6.9 L V8	P	4	(Austria) Franz Konrad	2, 7–8, 10–11
(Germany) Konrad Motorsport	Saleen S7-R	Ford 6.9 L V8	P	4	(Brazil) Antônio Hermann	4, 7, 9
(Germany) Konrad Motorsport	Saleen S7-R	Ford 6.9 L V8	P	4	(Germany) Sebastian Stahl	7
(Germany) Konrad Motorsport	Saleen S7-R	Ford 6.9 L V8	P	4	(Poland) Maciej Marcinkiewicz	8
(Germany) Konrad Motorsport	Saleen S7-R	Ford 6.9 L V8	P	4	(Italy) Marco Saviozzi	8
(Germany) Konrad Motorsport	Saleen S7-R	Ford 6.9 L V8	P	4	(Czech Republic) Adam Lacko	9–11
(Germany) Konrad Motorsport	Saleen S7-R	Ford 6.9 L V8	P	4	(Poland) Max Stanco	9
(Germany) Konrad Motorsport	Saleen S7-R	Ford 6.9 L V8	P	5	(Austria) Robert Lechner	1–2, 4, 7–11
(Germany) Konrad Motorsport	Saleen S7-R	Ford 6.9 L V8	P	5	(Austria) Franz Konrad	1, 9
(Germany) Konrad Motorsport	Saleen S7-R	Ford 6.9 L V8	P	5	(Germany) Uwe Alzen	2
(Germany) Konrad Motorsport	Saleen S7-R	Ford 6.9 L V8	P	5	(Italy) Matteo Bobbi	4
(Germany) Konrad Motorsport	Saleen S7-R	Ford 6.9 L V8	P	5	(France) Jean-Marc Gounon	7
(Germany) Konrad Motorsport	Saleen S7-R	Ford 6.9 L V8	P	5	(Italy) Paolo Ruberti	8–11
(Belgium) GLPK-Carsport	Chevrolet Corvette C5-R	Chevrolet LS7-R 7.0 L V8	P	6	(Belgium) Anthony Kumpen	All
(Belgium) GLPK-Carsport	Chevrolet Corvette C5-R	Chevrolet LS7-R 7.0 L V8	P	6	(Belgium) Bert Longin	All
(Belgium) GLPK-Carsport	Chevrolet Corvette C5-R	Chevrolet LS7-R 7.0 L V8	P	6	(Netherlands) Mike Hezemans	All
(Belgium) GLPK-Carsport	Chevrolet Corvette C5-R	Chevrolet LS7-R 7.0 L V8	P	6	(Netherlands) Jeroen Bleekemolen	6
(United Kingdom) Graham Nash Motorsport	Saleen S7-R	Ford 6.9 L V8	P	7	(Italy) Paolo Ruberti	1–5
(United Kingdom) Graham Nash Motorsport	Saleen S7-R	Ford 6.9 L V8	P	7	(Switzerland) Joël Camathias	1–4
(United Kingdom) Graham Nash Motorsport	Saleen S7-R	Ford 6.9 L V8	P	7	(Czech Republic) Jaroslav Janis	5
(United Kingdom) Graham Nash Motorsport	Saleen S7-R	Ford 6.9 L V8	P	8	(United Kingdom) Gavin Pickering	1
(United Kingdom) Graham Nash Motorsport	Saleen S7-R	Ford 6.9 L V8	P	8	(Germany) Hubert Haupt	1
(United Kingdom) Graham Nash Motorsport	Saleen S7-R	Ford 6.9 L V8	P	8	(Italy) Enea Casoni	2, 4
(United Kingdom) Graham Nash Motorsport	Saleen S7-R	Ford 6.9 L V8	P	8	(France) Philippe Almèras	2
(United Kingdom) Graham Nash Motorsport	Saleen S7-R	Ford 6.9 L V8	P	8	(France) Roland Bervillé	2
(United Kingdom) Graham Nash Motorsport	Saleen S7-R	Ford 6.9 L V8	P	8	(Italy) Marco Panzavuota	3–4
(United Kingdom) Graham Nash Motorsport	Saleen S7-R	Ford 6.9 L V8	P	8	(Italy) Luca Pirri	3, 5
(United Kingdom) Graham Nash Motorsport	Saleen S7-R	Ford 6.9 L V8	P	8	(United Kingdom) Ryan Hooker	3, 5
(United Kingdom) Graham Nash Motorsport	Saleen S7-R	Ford 6.9 L V8	P	8	(Italy) Edo Varini	4
(United Kingdom) Graham Nash Motorsport	Saleen S7-R	Ford 6.9 L V8	P	8	(Czech Republic) Robert Šenkýř	5
(United Kingdom) Graham Nash Motorsport	Saleen S7-R	Ford 6.9 L V8	P	8	(United Kingdom) Mike Newton	6
(United Kingdom) Graham Nash Motorsport	Saleen S7-R	Ford 6.9 L V8	P	8	(United Kingdom) Michael Mallock	6
(United Kingdom) Graham Nash Motorsport	Saleen S7-R	Ford 6.9 L V8	P	8	(United Kingdom) Phil Bennett	6
(United Kingdom) Graham Nash Motorsport	Saleen S7-R	Ford 6.9 L V8	P	8	(Brazil) Thomas Erdos	6
(Germany) Vitaphone Racing Team	Maserati MC12 GT1	Maserati 6.0 L V12	P	9	(Germany) Michael Bartels	All
(Germany) Vitaphone Racing Team	Maserati MC12 GT1	Maserati 6.0 L V12	P	9	(Germany) Timo Scheider	All
(Germany) Vitaphone Racing Team	Maserati MC12 GT1	Maserati 6.0 L V12	P	9	(Belgium) Eric van de Poele	6
(Germany) Vitaphone Racing Team	Maserati MC12 GT1	Maserati 6.0 L V12	P	10	(Italy) Fabio Babini	All
(Germany) Vitaphone Racing Team	Maserati MC12 GT1	Maserati 6.0 L V12	P	10	(Italy) Thomas Biagi	All
(Germany) Vitaphone Racing Team	Maserati MC12 GT1	Maserati 6.0 L V12	P	10	(United Kingdom) Jamie Davies	6
(France) Larbre Compétition	Ferrari 550-GTS Maranello	Ferrari F133 5.9 L V12	M	11	(Switzerland) Gabriele Gardel	All
(France) Larbre Compétition	Ferrari 550-GTS Maranello	Ferrari F133 5.9 L V12	M	11	(Portugal) Pedro Lamy	1–2, 4–5, 7–11
(France) Larbre Compétition	Ferrari 550-GTS Maranello	Ferrari F133 5.9 L V12	M	11	(Italy) Fabrizio Gollin	3
(France) Larbre Compétition	Ferrari 550-GTS Maranello	Ferrari F133 5.9 L V12	M	11	(France) Christophe Bouchut	6
(France) Larbre Compétition	Ferrari 550-GTS Maranello	Ferrari F133 5.9 L V12	M	11	(Belgium) Kurt Mollekens	6
(France) Larbre Compétition	Ferrari 550-GTS Maranello	Ferrari F133 5.9 L V12	M	11	(Belgium) Vincent Vosse	6
(France) Larbre Compétition	Ferrari 550-GTS Maranello	Ferrari F133 5.9 L V12	M	12	(Switzerland) Steve Zacchia	1–2, 6, 10–11
(France) Larbre Compétition	Ferrari 550-GTS Maranello	Ferrari F133 5.9 L V12	M	12	(Switzerland) Lilian Bryner	1–2, 6
(France) Larbre Compétition	Ferrari 550-GTS Maranello	Ferrari F133 5.9 L V12	M	12	(Switzerland) Enzo Calderari	1–2, 6
(France) Larbre Compétition	Ferrari 550-GTS Maranello	Ferrari F133 5.9 L V12	M	12	(Belgium) Frédéric Bouvy	6
(France) Larbre Compétition	Ferrari 550-GTS Maranello	Ferrari F133 5.9 L V12	M	12	(France) Jean-Luc Blanchemain	10
(France) Larbre Compétition	Ferrari 550-GTS Maranello	Ferrari F133 5.9 L V12	M	12	(Belgium) Vincent Vosse	10
(France) Larbre Compétition	Ferrari 550-GTS Maranello	Ferrari F133 5.9 L V12	M	12	(France) Roland Bervillé	11
(France) Larbre Compétition	Ferrari 550-GTS Maranello	Ferrari F133 5.9 L V12	M	12	(France) Raymond Narac	11
(Germany) Reiter Engineering	Lamborghini Murcielago R-GT	Lamborghini 6.0 L V12	M	13	(Netherlands) Peter Kox	1–2, 5, 7
(Germany) Reiter Engineering	Lamborghini Murcielago R-GT	Lamborghini 6.0 L V12	M	13	(Germany) Norman Simon	1–2, 7
(Germany) Reiter Engineering	Lamborghini Murcielago R-GT	Lamborghini 6.0 L V12	M	13	(Italy) Gianni Morbidelli	5
(United Kingdom) Lister Racing	Lister Storm GTM	Jaguar 7.0 L V12	D	14	(United Kingdom) Justin Keen	All
(United Kingdom) Lister Racing	Lister Storm GTM	Jaguar 7.0 L V12	D	14	(United States) Liz Halliday	All
(United Kingdom) Lister Racing	Lister Storm GTM	Jaguar 7.0 L V12	D	14	(Denmark) Jens Møller	6
(United Kingdom) Lister Racing	Lister Storm GTM	Jaguar 7.0 L V12	D	14	(United Kingdom) Bobby Verdon-Roe	6
(Monaco) JMB Racing	Maserati MC12 GT1	Maserati 6.0 L V12	P	15	(Italy) Andrea Bertolini	All
(Monaco) JMB Racing	Maserati MC12 GT1	Maserati 6.0 L V12	P	15	(Austria) Karl Wendlinger	All
(Monaco) JMB Racing	Maserati MC12 GT1	Maserati 6.0 L V12	P	15	(Austria) Philipp Peter	6
(Monaco) JMB Racing	Maserati MC12 GT1	Maserati 6.0 L V12	P	16	(Austria) Philipp Peter	1–5, 7–11
(Monaco) JMB Racing	Maserati MC12 GT1	Maserati 6.0 L V12	P	16	(United Kingdom) Chris Buncombe	1–5
(Monaco) JMB Racing	Maserati MC12 GT1	Maserati 6.0 L V12	P	16	(Russia) Roman Rusinov	1–5
(Monaco) JMB Racing	Maserati MC12 GT1	Maserati 6.0 L V12	P	16	(Netherlands) Arjan van der Zwaan	6–7
(Monaco) JMB Racing	Maserati MC12 GT1	Maserati 6.0 L V12	P	16	(Netherlands) Peter Kutemann	6, 10
(Monaco) JMB Racing	Maserati MC12 GT1	Maserati 6.0 L V12	P	16	(Netherlands) Rob van der Zwaan	6
(Monaco) JMB Racing	Maserati MC12 GT1	Maserati 6.0 L V12	P	16	(Italy) Marcello Zani	7, 9
(Monaco) JMB Racing	Maserati MC12 GT1	Maserati 6.0 L V12	P	16	(Switzerland) Christophe Pillon	8–9
(Monaco) JMB Racing	Maserati MC12 GT1	Maserati 6.0 L V12	P	16	(Turkey) Can Artam	8
(Monaco) JMB Racing	Maserati MC12 GT1	Maserati 6.0 L V12	P	16	(Italy) Luca Pirri	9
(Monaco) JMB Racing	Maserati MC12 GT1	Maserati 6.0 L V12	P	16	(Netherlands) Dick Waaijenberg	10
(Monaco) JMB Racing	Maserati MC12 GT1	Maserati 6.0 L V12	P	16	(United Kingdom) Jamie Davies	11
(Russia) Russian Age Racing	Ferrari 550-GTS Maranello; Aston Martin DBR9 (Note: Russian Age's No. 17 entry switched from a Ferrari 550 to an Aston Martin DBR9 from Round 9 onward. The team's No. 18 entry remained a Ferrari 550.)	Ferrari F133 5.9 L V12; Aston Martin 6.0 L V12	M	17	(Russia) Nikolai Fomenko	1–9
(Russia) Russian Age Racing	Ferrari 550-GTS Maranello; Aston Martin DBR9	Ferrari F133 5.9 L V12; Aston Martin 6.0 L V12	M	17	(Russia) Aleksey Vasilyev	1–9
(Russia) Russian Age Racing	Ferrari 550-GTS Maranello; Aston Martin DBR9	Ferrari F133 5.9 L V12; Aston Martin 6.0 L V12	M	17	(France) Christophe Bouchut	1–5, 7–11
(Russia) Russian Age Racing	Ferrari 550-GTS Maranello; Aston Martin DBR9	Ferrari F133 5.9 L V12; Aston Martin 6.0 L V12	M	17	(France) Nicolas Minassian	6
(Russia) Russian Age Racing	Ferrari 550-GTS Maranello; Aston Martin DBR9	Ferrari F133 5.9 L V12; Aston Martin 6.0 L V12	M	17	(United Kingdom) Jamie Campbell-Walter	6
(Russia) Russian Age Racing	Ferrari 550-GTS Maranello; Aston Martin DBR9	Ferrari F133 5.9 L V12; Aston Martin 6.0 L V12	M	17	(Monaco) Stéphane Ortelli	10
(Russia) Russian Age Racing	Ferrari 550-GTS Maranello; Aston Martin DBR9	Ferrari F133 5.9 L V12; Aston Martin 6.0 L V12	M	17	(Spain) Antonio García	11
(Russia) Russian Age Racing	Ferrari 550-GTS Maranello; Aston Martin DBR9	Ferrari F133 5.9 L V12; Aston Martin 6.0 L V12	M	18	(Russia) Nikolai Fomenko	10–11
(Russia) Russian Age Racing	Ferrari 550-GTS Maranello; Aston Martin DBR9	Ferrari F133 5.9 L V12; Aston Martin 6.0 L V12	M	18	(Russia) Aleksey Vasilyev	10–11
(Poland) RAM Racing	Saleen S7-R	Ford 6.9 L V8	P	20	(Poland) Max Stanco	1–2, 4–5, 7
(Poland) RAM Racing	Saleen S7-R	Ford 6.9 L V8	P	20	(Poland) Rafal Janus	1–2, 4–5, 7
(Poland) RAM Racing	Saleen S7-R	Ford 6.9 L V8	P	20	(Poland) Maciej Marcinkiewicz	5
(Poland) RAM Racing	Saleen S7-R	Ford 6.9 L V8	P	20	(Czech Republic) Adam Lacko	7
(Belgium) Renstal Excelsior	Chevrolet Corvette C5-R	Chevrolet LS7-R 7.0 L V8	M	22	(Belgium) Marc Duez	6
(Belgium) Renstal Excelsior	Chevrolet Corvette C5-R	Chevrolet LS7-R 7.0 L V8	M	22	(Netherlands) Jos Menten	6
(Belgium) Renstal Excelsior	Chevrolet Corvette C5-R	Chevrolet LS7-R 7.0 L V8	M	22	(France) Bruno Hernandez	6
(Belgium) Renstal Excelsior	Chevrolet Corvette C5-R	Chevrolet LS7-R 7.0 L V8	M	22	(France) Éric Cayrolle	6
(Germany) Wieth Racing	Ferrari 550 GTS	Ferrari F133 6.0 L V12	D	23	(Germany) Hubert Haupt	7
(Germany) Wieth Racing	Ferrari 550 GTS	Ferrari F133 6.0 L V12	D	23	(Denmark) Thomas Serwin	7
(Czech Republic) Rock Media Motors	Ferrari 575 GTC Evo 2005	Ferrari F133 GT 6.0 L V12	P	24	(Czech Republic) Antonín Herbeck	5
(Czech Republic) Rock Media Motors	Ferrari 575 GTC Evo 2005	Ferrari F133 GT 6.0 L V12	P	24	(Italy) Andrea Montermini	5
(Czech Republic) MenX	Ferrari 550-GTS Maranello	Ferrari F133 5.9 L V12	M	25	(Netherlands) Peter Kox	8
(Czech Republic) MenX	Ferrari 550-GTS Maranello	Ferrari F133 5.9 L V12	M	25	(Czech Republic) Robert Pergl	8
(United Kingdom) Aston Martin Racing (Note: As Aston Martin Racing were considered to be a factory team, they and their drivers were ineligible to score championship points.)	Aston Martin DBR9	Aston Martin 6.0 L V12	M	28	(United Kingdom) Darren Turner	3, 6
(United Kingdom) Aston Martin Racing	Aston Martin DBR9	Aston Martin 6.0 L V12	M	28	(Australia) David Brabham	3, 6
(United Kingdom) Aston Martin Racing	Aston Martin DBR9	Aston Martin 6.0 L V12	M	28	(France) Stéphane Sarrazin	6
(United Kingdom) Aston Martin Racing	Aston Martin DBR9	Aston Martin 6.0 L V12	M	29	(Netherlands) Peter Kox	3, 6
(United Kingdom) Aston Martin Racing	Aston Martin DBR9	Aston Martin 6.0 L V12	M	29	(Portugal) Pedro Lamy	3, 6
(United Kingdom) Aston Martin Racing	Aston Martin DBR9	Aston Martin 6.0 L V12	M	29	(Belgium) Marc Goossens	6

=== GT2 ===
Entrant	Car	Engine	Tyre	No.	Drivers	Rounds
(United Kingdom) Embassy Racing	Porsche 911 GT3-RSR	Porsche 3.6 L Flat-6	D	55	(New Zealand) Neil Cunningham	2–3, 6
(United Kingdom) Embassy Racing	Porsche 911 GT3-RSR	Porsche 3.6 L Flat-6	D	55	(United Kingdom) Ben Collins	2–3, 6
(United Kingdom) Embassy Racing	Porsche 911 GT3-RSR	Porsche 3.6 L Flat-6	D	55	(Germany) Sascha Maassen	6
(Czech Republic) Czech National Team	Porsche 911 GT3-R	Porsche 3.6 L Flat-6	P	56	(Czech Republic) Jan Vonka	All
(Czech Republic) Czech National Team	Porsche 911 GT3-R	Porsche 3.6 L Flat-6	P	56	(Italy) Daniele Amaduzzi	1, 4
(Czech Republic) Czech National Team	Porsche 911 GT3-R	Porsche 3.6 L Flat-6	P	56	(Italy) Mauro Casadei	2–3, 5, 7–9, 11
(Czech Republic) Czech National Team	Porsche 911 GT3-R	Porsche 3.6 L Flat-6	P	56	(Italy) Antonio De Castro	4, 6
(Czech Republic) Czech National Team	Porsche 911 GT3-R	Porsche 3.6 L Flat-6	P	56	(Slovakia) Miro Konopka	6
(Czech Republic) Czech National Team	Porsche 911 GT3-R	Porsche 3.6 L Flat-6	P	56	(Finland) Jari Nurminen	7
(Czech Republic) Czech National Team	Porsche 911 GT3-R	Porsche 3.6 L Flat-6	P	56	(France) Nicolas Armindo	8
(Czech Republic) Czech National Team	Porsche 911 GT3-R	Porsche 3.6 L Flat-6	P	56	(Austria) Manfred Jurasz	9–10
(Czech Republic) Czech National Team	Porsche 911 GT3-R	Porsche 3.6 L Flat-6	P	56	(Belgium) Armand Fumal	10
(Slovakia) Autoracing Club Bratislava	Porsche 911 GT3-R	Porsche 3.6 L Flat-6	M	57	(Slovakia) Miro Konopka	5, 8–11
(Slovakia) Autoracing Club Bratislava	Porsche 911 GT3-R	Porsche 3.6 L Flat-6	M	57	(Slovakia) Andřej Studenič	5
(Slovakia) Autoracing Club Bratislava	Porsche 911 GT3-R	Porsche 3.6 L Flat-6	M	57	(Italy) Luigi Emiliani	8
(Slovakia) Autoracing Club Bratislava	Porsche 911 GT3-R	Porsche 3.6 L Flat-6	M	57	(Slovakia) Štefan Rosina	9–11
(Italy) AB Motorsport	Porsche 911 GT3-RS	Porsche 3.6 L Flat-6	D	58	(Italy) Antonio De Castro	1
(Italy) AB Motorsport	Porsche 911 GT3-RS	Porsche 3.6 L Flat-6	D	58	(Italy) Renato Premoli	1
(Italy) AB Motorsport	Porsche 911 GT3-RS	Porsche 3.6 L Flat-6	D	58	(Italy) Bruno Barbaro	1
(Austria) Renauer Motorsport Team	Porsche 911 GT3-RS	Porsche 3.6 L Flat-6	D	63	(Austria) Manfred Jurasz	1, 5
(Austria) Renauer Motorsport Team	Porsche 911 GT3-RS	Porsche 3.6 L Flat-6	D	63	(Germany) Wolfgang Kaufmann	1, 5
(Austria) Renauer Motorsport Team	Porsche 911 GT3-RS	Porsche 3.6 L Flat-6	D	63	(Czech Republic) Petr Válek	5
(United Kingdom) GruppeM Racing	Porsche 911 GT3-RSR	Porsche 3.6 L Flat-6	M	66	(Germany) Marc Lieb	All
(United Kingdom) GruppeM Racing	Porsche 911 GT3-RSR	Porsche 3.6 L Flat-6	M	66	(Germany) Mike Rockenfeller	All
(United Kingdom) GruppeM Racing	Porsche 911 GT3-RSR	Porsche 3.6 L Flat-6	M	66	(Germany) Lucas Luhr	6
(United Kingdom) GruppeM Racing	Porsche 911 GT3-RSR	Porsche 3.6 L Flat-6	M	88	(France) Emmanuel Collard	All
(United Kingdom) GruppeM Racing	Porsche 911 GT3-RSR	Porsche 3.6 L Flat-6	M	88	(United Kingdom) Tim Sugden	All
(United Kingdom) GruppeM Racing	Porsche 911 GT3-RSR	Porsche 3.6 L Flat-6	M	88	(Monaco) Stéphane Ortelli	6
(Hong Kong) Noble Group-GruppeM	Porsche 911 GT3-RSR	Porsche 3.6 L Flat-6	M	68	(Hong Kong) Darryl O'Young	9
(Hong Kong) Noble Group-GruppeM	Porsche 911 GT3-RSR	Porsche 3.6 L Flat-6	M	68	(Hong Kong) Matthew Marsh	9
(Italy) Autorlando Sport	Porsche 911 GT3-RSR	Porsche 3.6 L Flat-6	P	67	(Italy) Luigi Moccia	6
(Italy) Autorlando Sport	Porsche 911 GT3-RSR	Porsche 3.6 L Flat-6	P	67	(Italy) Franco Groppi	6
(Italy) Autorlando Sport	Porsche 911 GT3-RSR	Porsche 3.6 L Flat-6	P	67	(Switzerland) Joël Camathias	6
(Germany) Proton Competition	Porsche 911 GT3-RS	Porsche 3.6 L Flat-6	D	69	(Germany) Gerold Ried	All
(Germany) Proton Competition	Porsche 911 GT3-RS	Porsche 3.6 L Flat-6	D	69	(Germany) Christian Ried	1–10
(Germany) Proton Competition	Porsche 911 GT3-RS	Porsche 3.6 L Flat-6	D	69	(Austria) Horst Felbermayr	6
(Germany) Proton Competition	Porsche 911 GT3-RS	Porsche 3.6 L Flat-6	D	69	(Austria) Horst Felbermayr Jr.	6
(Germany) Proton Competition	Porsche 911 GT3-RS	Porsche 3.6 L Flat-6	D	69	(Bahrain) Jaber Bin Ali Al Khalifa	11
(Slovakia) Machánek Racing	Porsche 911 GT3-RS; Porsche 911 GT3-RSR	Porsche 3.6 L Flat-6	P	71	(Slovakia) Rudolf Machánek	1
(Slovakia) Machánek Racing	Porsche 911 GT3-RS; Porsche 911 GT3-RSR	Porsche 3.6 L Flat-6	P	71	(Slovakia) Andřej Studenič	1
(Slovakia) Machánek Racing	Porsche 911 GT3-RS; Porsche 911 GT3-RSR	Porsche 3.6 L Flat-6	P	72	(Czech Republic) Josef Venc	1
(Slovakia) Machánek Racing	Porsche 911 GT3-RS; Porsche 911 GT3-RSR	Porsche 3.6 L Flat-6	P	72	(Hungary) Istvan Racz	1
(Italy) Ebimotors	Porsche 911 GT3-RS	Porsche 3.6 L Flat-6	P	74	(Italy) Emanuele Busnelli	1, 4–8, 10
(Italy) Ebimotors	Porsche 911 GT3-RS	Porsche 3.6 L Flat-6	P	74	(Italy) Luigi Moccia	1, 4–5, 7–11
(Italy) Ebimotors	Porsche 911 GT3-RS	Porsche 3.6 L Flat-6	P	74	(Italy) Paolo Rapetti	6, 11
(Italy) Ebimotors	Porsche 911 GT3-RS	Porsche 3.6 L Flat-6	P	74	(Italy) Andrea Sovinco	6
(Italy) Ebimotors	Porsche 911 GT3-RS	Porsche 3.6 L Flat-6	P	74	(Switzerland) Yvan Jacoma	6
(Italy) Ebimotors	Porsche 911 GT3-RS	Porsche 3.6 L Flat-6	P	74	(Italy) Cristian Passutti	9
(United Kingdom) Ian Khan	Porsche 911 GT3-R	Porsche 3.6 L Flat-6	D	75	(United Kingdom) Ian Khan	2, 6
(United Kingdom) Ian Khan	Porsche 911 GT3-R	Porsche 3.6 L Flat-6	D	75	(United Kingdom) Nigel Smith	2
(United Kingdom) Ian Khan	Porsche 911 GT3-R	Porsche 3.6 L Flat-6	D	75	(France) Paul Belmondo	6
(United Kingdom) Ian Khan	Porsche 911 GT3-R	Porsche 3.6 L Flat-6	D	75	(Belgium) Charles de Pauw	6
(United Kingdom) Ian Khan	Porsche 911 GT3-R	Porsche 3.6 L Flat-6	D	75	(Belgium) Alain van den Hove	6
(United Kingdom) Team Eurotech	Porsche 911 GT3-R; Porsche 911 GT3-RS	Porsche 3.6 L Flat-6	D	76	(United Kingdom) Godfrey Jones	2
(United Kingdom) Team Eurotech	Porsche 911 GT3-R; Porsche 911 GT3-RS	Porsche 3.6 L Flat-6	D	76	(United Kingdom) David Jones	2
(United Kingdom) Team Eurotech	Porsche 911 GT3-R; Porsche 911 GT3-RS	Porsche 3.6 L Flat-6	D	77	(United Kingdom) Mike Jordan	2
(United Kingdom) Team Eurotech	Porsche 911 GT3-R; Porsche 911 GT3-RS	Porsche 3.6 L Flat-6	D	77	(United Kingdom) Michael Caine	2
(United Kingdom) Graham Nash Motorsport	Porsche 911 GT3-R	Porsche 3.6 L Flat-6	P	78	(United Kingdom) Nigel Taylor	1
(United Kingdom) Graham Nash Motorsport	Porsche 911 GT3-R	Porsche 3.6 L Flat-6	P	78	(Italy) Marco Panzavuota	1
(United Kingdom) Graham Nash Motorsport	Porsche 911 GT3-R	Porsche 3.6 L Flat-6	P	78	(Canada) Tim Hauraney	1
(United Kingdom) Team LNT	TVR Tuscan T440R	TVR Speed Six 4.0 L I6	D	80	(United Kingdom) Lawrence Tomlinson	2–3
(United Kingdom) Team LNT	TVR Tuscan T440R	TVR Speed Six 4.0 L I6	D	80	(United Kingdom) Jonny Kane	2–3
(United Kingdom) Team LNT	TVR Tuscan T440R	TVR Speed Six 4.0 L I6	D	81	(United Kingdom) Warren Hughes	2
(United Kingdom) Team LNT	TVR Tuscan T440R	TVR Speed Six 4.0 L I6	D	81	(United Kingdom) Patrick Pearce	2
(United Kingdom) Scuderia Ecosse	Ferrari 360 Modena GTC	Ferrari 3.6 L V8	D	82	(United Kingdom) Tim Mullen	2
(United Kingdom) Scuderia Ecosse	Ferrari 360 Modena GTC	Ferrari 3.6 L V8	D	82	(Canada) Chris Niarchos	2
(United Kingdom) Scuderia Ecosse	Ferrari 360 Modena GTC	Ferrari 3.6 L V8	D	83	(United Kingdom) Andrew Kirkaldy	2
(United Kingdom) Scuderia Ecosse	Ferrari 360 Modena GTC	Ferrari 3.6 L V8	D	83	(United Kingdom) Nathan Kinch	2
(United Kingdom) Sebah Automotive	Porsche 911 GT3-R	Porsche 3.6 L Flat-6	P	84	(Germany) Pierre Ehret	3
(United Kingdom) Sebah Automotive	Porsche 911 GT3-R	Porsche 3.6 L Flat-6	P	84	(Denmark) Lars-Erik Nielsen	3
(United Kingdom) Cirtek Motorsport	Ferrari 360 Modena N-GT	Ferrari 3.6 L V8	D	85	(United Kingdom) Joe Macari	3–4
(United Kingdom) Cirtek Motorsport	Ferrari 360 Modena N-GT	Ferrari 3.6 L V8	D	85	(Sweden) Stefan Eriksson	3
(United Kingdom) Cirtek Motorsport	Ferrari 360 Modena N-GT	Ferrari 3.6 L V8	D	85	(United Kingdom) Rob Wilson	4
(Italy) GPC Sport	Ferrari 360 Modena N-GT	Ferrari 3.6 L V8	P	86	(Italy) Luca Drudi	3, 9–11
(Italy) GPC Sport	Ferrari 360 Modena N-GT	Ferrari 3.6 L V8	P	86	(Italy) Gabrio Rosa	3, 10
(Italy) GPC Sport	Ferrari 360 Modena N-GT	Ferrari 3.6 L V8	P	86	(Belgium) Stéphane Lémeret	5, 8
(Italy) GPC Sport	Ferrari 360 Modena N-GT	Ferrari 3.6 L V8	P	86	(Belgium) Loïc Deman	5
(Italy) GPC Sport	Ferrari 360 Modena N-GT	Ferrari 3.6 L V8	P	86	(Switzerland) Tiziano Carugati	7
(Italy) GPC Sport	Ferrari 360 Modena N-GT	Ferrari 3.6 L V8	P	86	(Switzerland) Claude Terrier	7
(Italy) GPC Sport	Ferrari 360 Modena N-GT	Ferrari 3.6 L V8	P	86	(Switzerland) Marco Lambertini	8, 10
(Italy) GPC Sport	Ferrari 360 Modena N-GT	Ferrari 3.6 L V8	P	86	(Italy) Batti Pregliasco	9, 11
(Italy) GPC Sport	Ferrari 360 Modena N-GT	Ferrari 3.6 L V8	P	86	(Hong Kong) Jeffrey Lee	9
(Italy) GPC Sport	Ferrari 360 Modena N-GT	Ferrari 3.6 L V8	P	86	(Italy) Luca Pirri	11
(Netherlands) Lammertink Racing	Porsche 911 GT3-RSR	Porsche 3.6 L Flat-6	D	87; 97 (Note: Lammertink Racing was entered as car No. 87 until Round 10 and 11, when it became No. 97.)	(Italy) Luca Moro	4, 7, 9–11
(Netherlands) Lammertink Racing	Porsche 911 GT3-RSR	Porsche 3.6 L Flat-6	D	87; 97	(Germany) Wolfgang Kaufmann	4, 7, 9–11
(Monaco) JMB Racing	Ferrari 360 Modena GT	Ferrari 3.6 L V8	P	89	(Netherlands) Peter Kutemann	5, 11
(Monaco) JMB Racing	Ferrari 360 Modena GT	Ferrari 3.6 L V8	P	89	(France) Antoine Gosse	5
(Monaco) JMB Racing	Ferrari 360 Modena GT	Ferrari 3.6 L V8	P	89	(Germany) Albert von Thurn und Taxis	10
(Monaco) JMB Racing	Ferrari 360 Modena GT	Ferrari 3.6 L V8	P	89	(United Kingdom) Chris Buncombe	10
(Monaco) JMB Racing	Ferrari 360 Modena GT	Ferrari 3.6 L V8	P	89	(Italy) Mauro Casadei	10
(Monaco) JMB Racing	Ferrari 360 Modena GT	Ferrari 3.6 L V8	P	89	(Netherlands) Dick Waaijenberg	11
(Netherlands) Spyker Squadron	Spyker C8 Spyder GT2R	Audi 3.8 L V8	D	90	(Netherlands) Duncan Huisman	9
(Netherlands) Spyker Squadron	Spyker C8 Spyder GT2R	Audi 3.8 L V8	D	90	(Netherlands) Menno Kuus	9
(Netherlands) Spyker Squadron	Spyker C8 Spyder GT2R	Audi 3.8 L V8	D	90	(Netherlands) Jeroen Bleekemolen	10–11
(Netherlands) Spyker Squadron	Spyker C8 Spyder GT2R	Audi 3.8 L V8	D	90	(Netherlands) Donny Crevels	10–11

== Season results ==
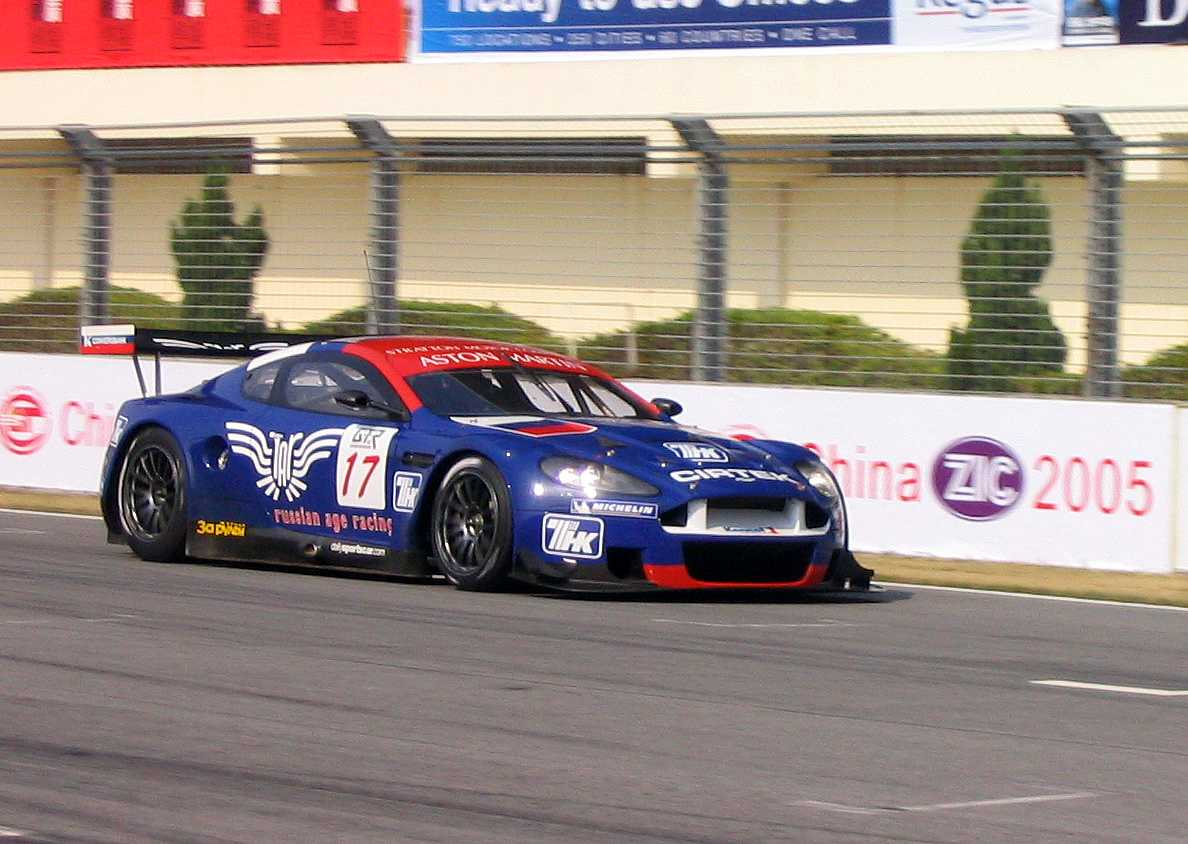
Russian Age Racing's Aston Martin DBR9 during practice at the Zhuhai round of the 2005 FIA GT Championship

Overall winners in bold.

Rnd	Circuit	GT1 Winning Team	GT2 Winning Team	Results
Rnd	Circuit	GT1 Winning Drivers	GT2 Winning Drivers	Results
1	Monza	**(France) #11 Larbre Compétition**	(United Kingdom) #66 Gruppe M Racing	Results
1	Monza	(Portugal) **Pedro Lamy** (Switzerland) **Gabriele Gardel**	(Germany) Marc Lieb (Germany) Mike Rockenfeller	Results
2	Magny-Cours	**(Monaco) #15 JMB Racing**	(United Kingdom) #88 Gruppe M Racing	Results
2	Magny-Cours	(Italy) **Andrea Bertolini** (Austria) **Karl Wendlinger**	(United Kingdom) Tim Sugden (France) Emmanuel Collard	Results
3	Silverstone	**(United Kingdom) #29 Aston Martin Racing**	(United Kingdom) #66 Gruppe M Racing	Results
3	Silverstone	(Portugal) **Pedro Lamy** (Netherlands) **Peter Kox**	(Germany) Marc Lieb (Germany) Mike Rockenfeller	Results
4	Imola	**(Belgium) #6 GLPK-Carsport**	(United Kingdom) #88 Gruppe M Racing	Results
4	Imola	(Belgium) **Bert Longin** (Belgium) **Anthony Kumpen** (Netherlands) **Mike Hezemans**	(Germany) Marc Lieb (Germany) Mike Rockenfeller	Results
5	Brno	**(France) #11 Larbre Compétition**	(United Kingdom) #66 Gruppe M Racing	Results
5	Brno	(Portugal) **Pedro Lamy** (Switzerland) **Gabriele Gardel**	(Germany) Marc Lieb (Germany) Mike Rockenfeller	Results
6	Spa	**(Germany) #9 Vitaphone Racing Team**	(United Kingdom) #66 Gruppe M Racing	Results
6	Spa	(Germany) **Timo Scheider** (Germany) **Michael Bartels** (Belgium) **Eric van de Poele**	(Germany) Marc Lieb (Germany) Mike Rockenfeller (Germany) Lucas Luhr	Results
7	Oschersleben	**(Germany) #10 Vitaphone Racing Team**	(United Kingdom) #88 Gruppe M Racing	Results
7	Oschersleben	(Italy) **Thomas Biagi** (Italy) **Fabio Babini**	(United Kingdom) Tim Sugden (France) Emmanuel Collard	Results
8	Istanbul	**(Germany) #9 Vitaphone Racing Team**	(United Kingdom) #88 Gruppe M Racing	Results
8	Istanbul	(Germany) **Timo Scheider** (Germany) **Michael Bartels**	(United Kingdom) Tim Sugden (France) Emmanuel Collard	Results
9	Zhuhai	**(Belgium) #6 GLPK-Carsport**	(United Kingdom) #66 Gruppe M Racing	Results
9	Zhuhai	(Belgium) **Bert Longin** (Belgium) **Anthony Kumpen** (Netherlands) **Mike Hezemans**	(Germany) Marc Lieb (Germany) Mike Rockenfeller	Results
10	Dubai	**(France) #11 Larbre Compétition**	(United Kingdom) #88 Gruppe M Racing	Results
10	Dubai	(Portugal) **Pedro Lamy** (Switzerland) **Gabriele Gardel**	(United Kingdom) Tim Sugden (France) Emmanuel Collard	Results
11	Bahrain	**(Russia) #17 Russian Age Racing**	(United Kingdom) #66 Gruppe M Racing	Results
11	Bahrain	(France) **Christophe Bouchut** (Spain) **Antonio García**	(Germany) Marc Lieb (Germany) Mike Rockenfeller	Results

== Drivers Championship ==
Points were awarded at each round to the top eight finishers in both the GT1 & GT2 classes on a 10 8 6 5 4 3 2 1 basis except for the Spa 24 Hour event were “double points” were awarded in three parts as follows:

- 5 4 3 2.5 2 1.5 1 0.5 according to the classification after six hours
- 5 4 3 2.5 2 1.5 1 0.5 according to the classification after twelve hours
- 10 8 6 5 4 3 2 1 according to the classification at the end of the race

=== GT1 Standings ===
The GT1 Championship for Drivers was awarded to Gabriele Gardel of Switzerland, who drove a Ferrari 550-GTS Maranello for the Larbre Competition team.

Pos.	Driver	Team	MON (Italy)	MAG (France)	SIL (United Kingdom)	IMO (Italy)	BRN (Czech Republic)	SPA (Belgium)			OSC (Germany)	IST (Turkey)	ZHU (China)	DUB (United Arab Emirates)	BHR (Bahrain)	Total points
Pos.	Driver	Team	MON (Italy)	MAG (France)	SIL (United Kingdom)	IMO (Italy)	BRN (Czech Republic)	6H	12H	24H	OSC (Germany)	IST (Turkey)	ZHU (China)	DUB (United Arab Emirates)	BHR (Bahrain)	Total points
1	(Switzerland) Gabriele Gardel	(France) Larbre Compétition	1	5	4	2	1	5	4	3	7	6	2	1	4	75
2	(Germany) Michael Bartels	(Germany) Vitaphone Racing Team	2	2	3	Ret	5	1	1	1	13	1	3	2	5	74
2	(Germany) Timo Scheider	(Germany) Vitaphone Racing Team	2	2	3	Ret	5	1	1	1	13	1	3	2	5	74
3	(Austria) Karl Wendlinger	(Monaco) JMB Racing	5	1	2	4	2	3	3	2	2	3	6	4	Ret	71
3	(Italy) Andrea Bertolini	(Monaco) JMB Racing	5	1	2	4	2	3	3	2	2	3	6	4	Ret	71
4	(Italy) Fabio Babini	(Germany) Vitaphone Racing Team	3	3	1	3	Ret	2	2	Ret	1	2	4	5	9	63
4	(Italy) Thomas Biagi	(Germany) Vitaphone Racing Team	3	3	1	3	Ret	2	2	Ret	1	2	4	5	9	63
5	(Portugal) Pedro Lamy	(France) Larbre Compétition	1	5		2	1				7	6	2	1	4	60
5	(Portugal) Pedro Lamy	(United Kingdom) Aston Martin Racing			NC			NC	NC	NC						60
6	(Netherlands) Mike Hezemans	(Belgium) GLPK-Carsport	10	4	Ret	1	4	DSQ	DSQ	DSQ	3	5	1	3	3	52
6	(Belgium) Bert Longin	(Belgium) GLPK-Carsport	10	4	Ret	1	4	DSQ	DSQ	DSQ	3	5	1	3	3	52
6	(Belgium) Anthony Kumpen	(Belgium) GLPK-Carsport	10	4	Ret	1	4	DSQ	DSQ	DSQ	3	5	1	3	3	52
7	(Austria) Philipp Peter	(Monaco) JMB Racing	4	7	6	5	6	3	3	2	5	7	Ret	10	2	45
8	(France) Christophe Bouchut	(Russia) Russian Age Racing	Ret	8	8	Ret	8				11	8	Ret	11	1	24
8	(France) Christophe Bouchut	(France) Larbre Compétition						5	4	3						24
9	(Belgium) Eric van de Poele	(Germany) Vitaphone Racing Team						1	1	1						20
10	(Italy) Andrea Piccini	(Italy) GPC Sport	Ret	9	5	Ret	Ret	Ret	Ret	Ret	6	4	5	6	12	19
10	(Switzerland) Jean-Denis Délétraz	(Italy) GPC Sport	Ret	9	5	Ret	Ret	Ret	Ret	Ret	6	4	5	6	12	19
11	(Russia) Roman Rusinov	(Monaco) JMB Racing	4	7	6	5	6									17
11	(United Kingdom) Chris Buncombe	(Monaco) JMB Racing	4	7	6	5	6									17
12	(United Kingdom) Jamie Davies	(Germany) Vitaphone Racing Team						2	2	Ret						16
12	(United Kingdom) Jamie Davies	(Monaco) JMB Racing													2	16
13	(Switzerland) Steve Zacchia	(France) Larbre Compétition	6	6				6	5	4				9	8	16
14	(Switzerland) Enzo Calderari	(France) Larbre Compétition	6	6				6	5	4						15
14	(Switzerland) Lilian Bryner	(France) Larbre Compétition	6	6				6	5	4						15
15	(France) Jean-Philippe Belloc	(Italy) GPC Sport	13		Ret	6	3	9	8	7	12					11.5
16	(Spain) Antonio García	(Russia) Russian Age Racing													1	10
17	(Belgium) Vincent Vosse	(France) Larbre Compétition						5	4	3				9		10
18	(Belgium) Kurt Mollekens	(France) Larbre Compétition						5	4	3						10
19	(Brazil) Jaime Melo	(Italy) GPC Sport	13		Ret	6	3	Ret	Ret	Ret	12					9
20	(Belgium) Frédéric Bouvy	(France) Larbre Compétition						6	5	4						9
21	(Belgium) Marc Duez	(Belgium) Renstal Excelsior						4	6	5						8
21	(Netherlands) Jos Menten	(Belgium) Renstal Excelsior						4	6	5						8
21	(France) Bruno Hernandez	(Belgium) Renstal Excelsior						4	6	5						8
21	(France) Éric Cayrolle	(Belgium) Renstal Excelsior						4	6	5						8
22	(Austria) Robert Lechner	(Germany) Konrad Motorsport	Ret	Ret		Ret					4	Ret	Ret	Ret	7	7
23	(United States) Liz Halliday	(United Kingdom) Lister Racing	7	Ret	NC	Ret	7	10	Ret	Ret	9	9	Ret	7	Ret	6
23	(United Kingdom) Justin Keen	(United Kingdom) Lister Racing	7	Ret	NC	Ret	7	10	Ret	Ret	9	9	Ret	7	Ret	6
24	(Italy) Fabrizio Gollin	(France) Larbre Compétition			4											5
24	(France) Jean-Marc Gounon	(Germany) Konrad Motorsport									4					5
25	(Netherlands) Arjan van der Zwaan	(Monaco) JMB Racing						7	Ret	Ret	5					5
26	(Russia) Nikolai Fomenko	(Russia) Russian Age Racing	Ret	8	8	Ret	8	Ret	Ret	Ret	11	8	Ret	8	10	5
26	(Russia) Aleksey Vasilyev	(Russia) Russian Age Racing	Ret	8	8	Ret	8	Ret	Ret	Ret	11	8	Ret	8	10	5
27	(Belgium) Stéphane Lémeret	(Italy) GPC Sport						9	8	7				6		4.5
28	(United Kingdom) Mike Newton	(United Kingdom) Graham Nash Motorsport						8	7	6						4.5
28	(United Kingdom) Michael Mallock	(United Kingdom) Graham Nash Motorsport						8	7	6						4.5
28	(United Kingdom) Phil Bennett	(United Kingdom) Graham Nash Motorsport						8	7	6						4.5
28	(Brazil) Thomas Erdos	(United Kingdom) Graham Nash Motorsport						8	7	6						4.5
29	(Italy) Marcello Zani	(Monaco) JMB Racing									5		Ret			4
30	(Italy) Marco Panzavuota	(United Kingdom) Graham Nash Motorsport			7	7										4
31	(Italy) Andrea Montermini	(Czech Republic) Rock Media Motors					9									3
31	(Italy) Andrea Montermini	(Italy) GPC Sport												Ret	6	3
32	(Italy) Marco Cioci	(Italy) GPC Sport												Ret	6	3
33	(Italy) Paolo Ruberti	(United Kingdom) Graham Nash Motorsport	8	12	9	Ret	DNS									3
33	(Italy) Paolo Ruberti	(Germany) Konrad Motorsport										Ret	Ret	Ret	7	3
34	(Italy) Stefano Livio	(Italy) GPC Sport						9	8	7						2.5
34	(Belgium) Loïc Deman	(Italy) GPC Sport						9	8	7						2.5
35	(Italy) Enea Casoni	(United Kingdom) Graham Nash Motorsport		10		7										2
35	(Italy) Luca Pirri	(United Kingdom) Graham Nash Motorsport			7		10									2
35	(United Kingdom) Ryan Hooker	(United Kingdom) Graham Nash Motorsport			7		10									2
36	(Italy) Edo Varini	(United Kingdom) Graham Nash Motorsport				7										2
36	(Switzerland) Christophe Pillon	(Monaco) JMB Racing										7	Ret			2
36	(Turkey) Can Artam	(Monaco) JMB Racing										7				2
37	(Switzerland) Joël Camathias	(United Kingdom) Graham Nash Motorsport	8	12	9	Ret										1
38	(Netherlands) Peter Kox	(Germany) Reiter Engineering	Ret	13			Ret				8					1
38	(Netherlands) Peter Kox	(United Kingdom) Aston Martin Racing			NC			NC	NC	NC						1
38	(Netherlands) Peter Kox	(Czech Republic) MenX										10				1
39	(France) Roland Bervillé	(United Kingdom) Graham Nash Motorsport		10												1
39	(France) Roland Bervillé	(France) Larbre Compétition													8	1
40	(Germany) Norman Simon	(Germany) Reiter Engineering	Ret	13							8					1
41	(France) Raymond Narac	(France) Larbre Compétition													8	1
42	(Netherlands) Peter Kutemann	(Monaco) JMB Racing						7	Ret	Ret				10		1
43	(Netherlands) Rob van der Zwaan	(Monaco) JMB Racing						7	Ret	Ret						1
Pos.	Driver	Team	MON (Italy)	MAG (France)	SIL (United Kingdom)	IMO (Italy)	BRN (Czech Republic)	6H	12H	24H	OSC (Germany)	IST (Turkey)	ZHU (China)	DUB (United Arab Emirates)	BHR (Bahrain)	Total points
Pos.	Driver	Team	MON (Italy)	MAG (France)	SIL (United Kingdom)	IMO (Italy)	BRN (Czech Republic)	SPA (Belgium)			OSC (Germany)	IST (Turkey)	ZHU (China)	DUB (United Arab Emirates)	BHR (Bahrain)	Total points

Colour	Result
Gold	Winner
Silver	Second place
Bronze	Third place
Green	Points classification
Blue	Non-points classification
Blue	Non-classified finish (NC)
Purple	Retired, not classified (Ret)
Red	Did not qualify (DNQ)
Red	Did not pre-qualify (DNPQ)
Black	Disqualified (DSQ)
White	Did not start (DNS)
White	Withdrew (WD)
White	Race cancelled (C)
Blank	Did not practice (DNP)
Blank	Did not arrive (DNA)
Blank	Excluded (EX)

=== GT2 Standings ===
The GT2 Cup for Drivers was awarded jointly to German drivers Mike Rockenfeller and Marc Lieb who shared a Porsche 996 GT3 RSR entered by GruppeM Racing.

Pos.	Driver	Team	MON (Italy)	MAG (France)	SIL (United Kingdom)	IMO (Italy)	BRN (Czech Republic)	SPA (Belgium)			OSC (Germany)	IST (Turkey)	ZHU (China)	DUB (United Arab Emirates)	BHR (Bahrain)	Total points
Pos.	Driver	Team	MON (Italy)	MAG (France)	SIL (United Kingdom)	IMO (Italy)	BRN (Czech Republic)	6H	12H	24H	OSC (Germany)	IST (Turkey)	ZHU (China)	DUB (United Arab Emirates)	BHR (Bahrain)	Total points
1	(Germany) Marc Lieb	(United Kingdom) GruppeM Racing	1	2	1	2	1	1	1	1	2	2	1	Ret	1	102
1	(Germany) Mike Rockenfeller	(United Kingdom) GruppeM Racing	1	2	1	2	1	1	1	1	2	2	1	Ret	1	102
2	(France) Emmanuel Collard	(United Kingdom) GruppeM Racing	2	1	6	1	Ret	6	6	4	1	1	2	1	5	78
2	(United Kingdom) Tim Sugden	(United Kingdom) GruppeM Racing	2	1	6	1	Ret	6	6	4	1	1	2	1	5	78
3	(Italy) Luigi Moccia	(Italy) Ebimotors	3			5	6				5	3	3	5	3	55
3	(Italy) Luigi Moccia	(Italy) Autorlando Sport						2	2	2						55
4	(Germany) Gerold Ried	(Germany) Proton Competition	6	9	5	4	4	5	3	3	3	4	Ret	4	8	45
5	(Germany) Christian Ried	(Germany) Proton Competition	6	9	5	4	4	5	3	3	3	4	Ret	4		44
6	(Czech Republic) Jan Vonka	(Czech Republic) Czech National Team	Ret	10	9	6	3	4	5	6	4	5	7	Ret	Ret	27.5
7	(Italy) Emanuele Busnelli	(Italy) Ebimotors	3			5	6	Ret	Ret	Ret	5	3		5		27
8	(Germany) Wolfgang Kaufmann	(Austria) Renauer Motorsport Team	5				2									23
8	(Germany) Wolfgang Kaufmann	(Netherlands) Lammertink Racing				3					Ret		Ret	Ret	4	23
9	(Italy) Mauro Casadei	(Czech Republic) Czech National Team		10	9		3				4	5	7		Ret	23
9	(Italy) Mauro Casadei	(Monaco) JMB Racing												3		23
10	(Germany) Lucas Luhr	(United Kingdom) GruppeM Racing						1	1	1						20
11	(Slovakia) Miro Konopka	(Slovakia) Autoracing Club Bratislava					5					6	6	Ret	7	19.5
11	(Slovakia) Miro Konopka	(Czech Republic) Czech National Team						4	5	6						19.5
12	(New Zealand) Neil Cunningham	(United Kingdom) Embassy Racing		DNS	2			3	4	5						17.5
12	(United Kingdom) Ben Collins	(United Kingdom) Embassy Racing		DNS	2			3	4	5						17.5
13	(Switzerland) Joël Camathias	(Italy) Autorlando Sport						2	2	2						16
13	(Italy) Franco Groppi	(Italy) Autorlando Sport						2	2	2						16
14	(Austria) Manfred Jurasz	(Austria) Renauer Motorsport Team	5				2									14
14	(Austria) Manfred Jurasz	(Czech Republic) Czech National Team												Ret	Ret	14
15	(Italy) Luca Drudi	(Italy) GPC Sport			4								Ret	Ret	2	13
16	(Italy) Luca Moro	(Netherlands) Lammertink Racing				3					Ret		Ret	Ret	4	11
17	(Austria) Horst Felbermayr	(Germany) Proton Competition						5	3	3						11
17	(Austria) Horst Felbermayr Jr.	(Germany) Proton Competition						5	3	3						11
18	(Italy) Antonio De Castro	(Italy) AB Motorsport	Ret													10.5
18	(Italy) Antonio De Castro	(Czech Republic) Czech National Team				6		4	5	6						10.5
19	(Germany) Sascha Maassen	(United Kingdom) Embassy Racing						3	4	5						9.5
20	(United Kingdom) Lawrence Tomlinson	(United Kingdom) Team LNT		6	3											9
20	(United Kingdom) Jonny Kane	(United Kingdom) Team LNT		6	3											9
21	(Czech Republic) Petr Válek	(Austria) Renauer Motorsport Team					2									8
21	(Netherlands) Jeroen Bleekemolen	(Netherlands) Spyker Squadron												2	Ret	8
21	(Netherlands) Donny Crevels	(Netherlands) Spyker Squadron												2	Ret	8
21	(Italy) Luca Pirri	(Italy) GPC Sport													2	8
22	(United Kingdom) Nathan Kinch	(United Kingdom) Scuderia Ecosse		3												6
22	(United Kingdom) Andrew Kirkaldy	(United Kingdom) Scuderia Ecosse		3												6
22	(Italy) Christian Passutti	(Italy) Ebimotors											3			6
22	(United Kingdom) Chris Buncombe	(Monaco) JMB Racing												3		6
22	(Germany) Albert von Thurn und Taxis	(Monaco) JMB Racing												3		6
22	(Italy) Paolo Rapetti	(Italy) Ebimotors						Ret	Ret	Ret					3	6
23	(Hungary) Istvan Racz	(Slovakia) Machánek Racing	4													5
23	(Slovakia) Josef Venč	(Slovakia) Machánek Racing	4													5
23	(United Kingdom) Tim Mullen	(United Kingdom) Scuderia Ecosse		4												5
23	(Canada) Chris Niarchos	(United Kingdom) Scuderia Ecosse		4												5
23	(Italy) Gabrio Rosa	(Italy) GPC Sport			4									Ret		5
23	(Monaco) Stéphane Ortelli	(United Kingdom) GruppeM Racing						6	6	4						5
23	(Finland) Jari Nurminen	(Czech Republic) Czech National Team									4					5
23	(Hong Kong) Matthew Marsh	(Hong Kong) Noble Group-GruppeM											4			5
23	(Hong Kong) Darryl O'Young	(Hong Kong) Noble Group-GruppeM											4			5
24	(Netherlands) Peter Kutemann	(Monaco) JMB Racing					7								6	5
24	(Slovakia) Štefan Rosina	(Slovakia) Autoracing Club Bratislava											6	Ret	7	5
25	(United Kingdom) Mike Jordan	(United Kingdom) Team Eurotech		5												4
25	(United Kingdom) Michael Caine	(United Kingdom) Team Eurotech		5												4
25	(Slovakia) Andřej Studenič	(Slovakia) Machánek Racing	Ret													4
25	(Slovakia) Andřej Studenič	(Slovakia) Autoracing Club Bratislava					5									4
25	(France) Nicholas Armindo	(Czech Republic) Czech National Team										5				4
25	(Netherlands) Duncan Huisman	(Netherlands) Spyker Squadron											5			4
25	(Netherlands) Menno Kuus	(Netherlands) Spyker Squadron											5			4
26	(Italy) Davide Amaduzzi	(Czech Republic) Czech National Team	Ret			6										3
26	(Switzerland) Tiziano Carugati	(Italy) GPC Sport									6					3
26	(Switzerland) Claude Terrier	(Italy) GPC Sport									6					3
26	(Italy) Luigi Emiliani	(Slovakia) Autoracing Club Bratislava										6				3
26	(Netherlands) Dick Waaijenberg	(Monaco) JMB Racing													6	3
27	(United Kingdom) Warren Hughes	(United Kingdom) Team LNT		7												2
27	(United Kingdom) Patrick Pearce	(United Kingdom) Team LNT		7												2
27	(Germany) Pierre Ehret	(United Kingdom) Sebah Automotive			7											2
27	(Denmark) Lars-Erik Nielsen	(United Kingdom) Sebah Automotive			7											2
27	(France) Antoine Gosse	(Monaco) JMB Racing					7									2
27	(Belgium) Stéphane Lémeret	(Italy) GPC Sport					Ret					7				2
27	(Italy) Marco Lambertini	(Italy) GPC Sport										7		Ret		2
28	(United Kingdom) Godfrey Jones	(United Kingdom) Team Eurotech		8												1
28	(United Kingdom) David Jones	(United Kingdom) Team Eurotech		8												1
28	(United Kingdom) Joe Macari	(United Kingdom) Cirtek Motorsport			8	Ret										1
28	(Sweden) Stefan Eriksson	(United Kingdom) Cirtek Motorsport			8											1
28	(Bahrain) Jaber Bin Ali Al Khalifa	(Germany) Proton Competition													8	1
Pos.	Driver	Team	MON (Italy)	MAG (France)	SIL (United Kingdom)	IMO (Italy)	BRN (Czech Republic)	6H	12H	24H	OSC (Germany)	IST (Turkey)	ZHU (China)	DUB (United Arab Emirates)	BHR (Bahrain)	Total points
Pos.	Driver	Team	MON (Italy)	MAG (France)	SIL (United Kingdom)	IMO (Italy)	BRN (Czech Republic)	SPA (Belgium)			OSC (Germany)	IST (Turkey)	ZHU (China)	DUB (United Arab Emirates)	BHR (Bahrain)	Total points

== Teams Championship ==
Points were awarded at each round to the top eight finishers in both the GT1 & GT2 classes on a 10 8 6 5 4 3 2 1 basis except for the Spa 24 Hour event were “double points” were awarded in three parts as follows:

- 5 4 3 2.5 2 1.5 1 0.5 according to the classification after six hours
- 5 4 3 2.5 2 1.5 1 0.5 according to the classification after twelve hours
- 10 8 6 5 4 3 2 1 according to the classification at the end of the race

=== GT1 Standings ===
Pos.	Team	MON (Italy)	MAG (France)	SIL (United Kingdom)	IMO (Italy)	BRN (Czech Republic)	SPA (Belgium)			OSC (Germany)	IST (Turkey)	ZHU (China)	DUB (United Arab Emirates)	BHR (Bahrain)	Total points
Pos.	Team	MON (Italy)	MAG (France)	SIL (United Kingdom)	IMO (Italy)	BRN (Czech Republic)	6H	12H	24H	OSC (Germany)	IST (Turkey)	ZHU (China)	DUB (United Arab Emirates)	BHR (Bahrain)	Total points
1	(Germany) Vitaphone Racing Team	2	2	1	3	5	1	1	1	1	1	3	2	5	137
1	(Germany) Vitaphone Racing Team	3	3	3	Ret	Ret	2	2	Ret	13	2	4	5	9	137
2	(Monaco) JMB Racing	4	1	2	4	2	3	3	2	2	3	6	4	2	103
2	(Monaco) JMB Racing	5	7	6	5	6	7	Ret	Ret	5	7	Ret	10	Ret	103
3	(France) Larbre Compétition	1	5	4	2	1	5	4	3	7	6	2	1	4	91
3	(France) Larbre Compétition	6	6				6	5	4				9	8	91
4	(Belgium) GLPK-Carsport	10	4	Ret	1	4	DSQ	DSQ	DSQ	3	5	1	3	3	52
5	(Italy) GPC Sport	13	9	5	6	3	9	8	7	6	4	5	6	6	33.5
5	(Italy) GPC Sport	Ret		Ret	Ret	Ret	Ret	Ret	Ret	12			Ret	12	33.5
6	(Russia) Russian Age Racing	Ret	8	8	Ret	8	Ret	Ret	Ret	11	8	Ret	8	1	15
6	(Russia) Russian Age Racing												11	10	15
7	(United Kingdom) Graham Nash Motorsport	8	10	7	7	10	8	7	6						9.5
7	(United Kingdom) Graham Nash Motorsport	11	12	9	Ret	DNS									9.5
8	(Belgium) Rennstal Excelsior						4	6	5						8
9	(Germany) Konrad Motorsport	12	11		Ret					4	Ret	Ret	Ret	7	7
9	(Germany) Konrad Motorsport	Ret	Ret		Ret					10	Ret	Ret	Ret	11	7
10	(United Kingdom) Lister Racing	7	Ret	NC	Ret	7	10	Ret	Ret	9	9	Ret	7	Ret	6
11	(Germany) Reiter Engineering	Ret	13			Ret				8					1
-	(Poland) RAM Racing	9	Ret		NC	11				Ret					0
-	(Czech Republic) Rock Media Motors					9									0
-	(Czech Republic) MenX										10				0
-	(Germany) Wieth Racing									Ret					0

Colour	Result
Gold	Winner
Silver	Second place
Bronze	Third place
Green	Points classification
Blue	Non-points classification
Blue	Non-classified finish (NC)
Purple	Retired, not classified (Ret)
Red	Did not qualify (DNQ)
Red	Did not pre-qualify (DNPQ)
Black	Disqualified (DSQ)
White	Did not start (DNS)
White	Withdrew (WD)
White	Race cancelled (C)
Blank	Did not practice (DNP)
Blank	Did not arrive (DNA)
Blank	Excluded (EX)

=== GT2 Standings ===
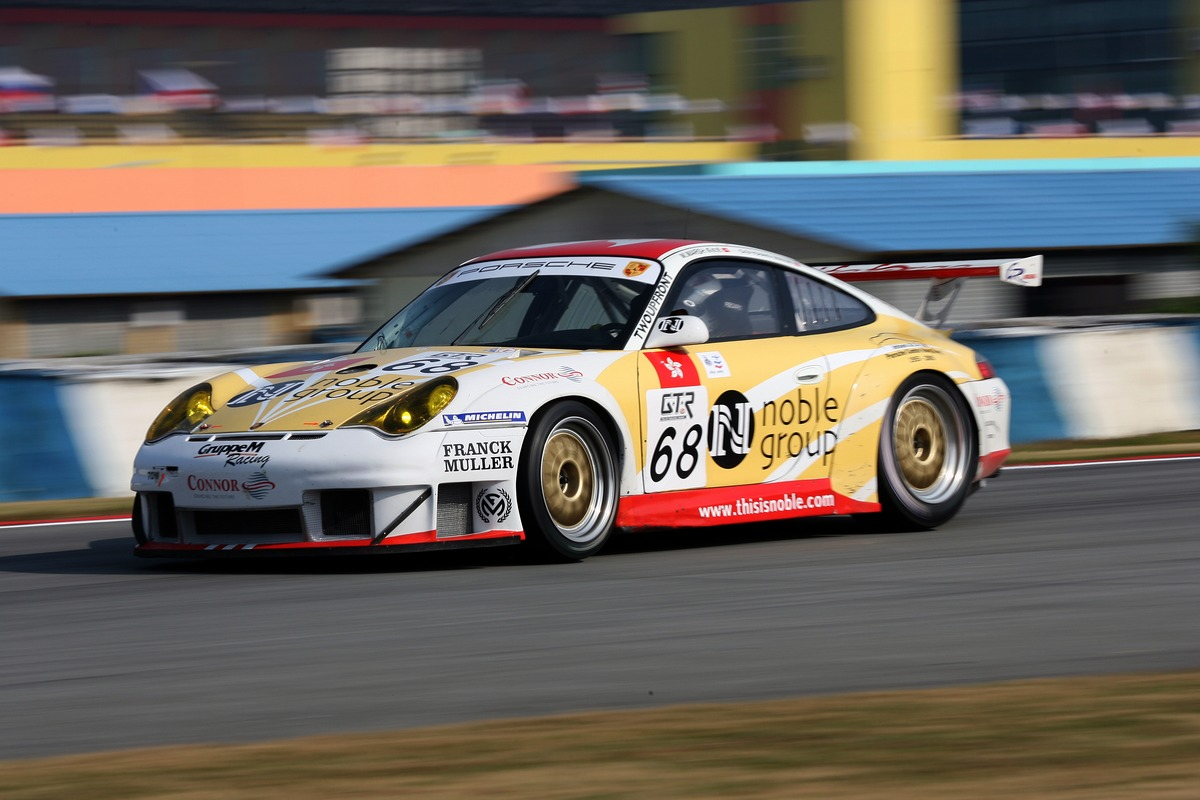
A Noble Group/Gruppe M Porsche 911 GT3-RSR contesting the GT2 division of the 2005 FIA GT Championship

Pos.	Team	MON (Italy)	MAG (France)	SIL (United Kingdom)	IMO (Italy)	BRN (Czech Republic)	SPA (Belgium)			OSC (Germany)	IST (Turkey)	ZHU (China)	DUB (United Arab Emirates)	BHR (Bahrain)	Total points
Pos.	Team	MON (Italy)	MAG (France)	SIL (United Kingdom)	IMO (Italy)	BRN (Czech Republic)	6H	12H	24H	OSC (Germany)	IST (Turkey)	ZHU (China)	DUB (United Arab Emirates)	BHR (Bahrain)	Total points
1	(United Kingdom) GruppeM Racing	1	1	1	1	1	1	1	1	1	1	1	1	1	180
1	(United Kingdom) GruppeM Racing	2	2	6	2	Ret	6	6	4	2	2	2	Ret	5	180
2	(Germany) Proton Competition	6	9	5	4	4	5	3	3	3	4	Ret	4	8	45
3	(Italy) Ebimotors	3			5	6	Ret	Ret	Ret	5	3	3	5	3	39
4	(Czech Republic) Czech National Team	Ret	10	9	6	3	4	5	6	4	5	7	Ret	Ret	27.5
5	(Italy) GPC Sport			4		DNS				6	7	Ret	Ret	2	18
6	(United Kingdom) Embassy Racing		DNS	2			3	4	5						17.5
7	(Italy) Autorlando Sport						2	2	2						16
8	(Austria) Renauer Motorsport Team	5				2									12
8	(Netherlands) Spyker Squadron											5	2	Ret	12
9	(Slovakia) Autoracing Club Bratislava					5						6	6	7	12
10	(United Kingdom) Scuderia Ecosse		3												11
10	(United Kingdom) Scuderia Ecosse		4												11
10	(Netherlands) Lammertink Racing				3					Ret		Ret	Ret	4	11
11	(United Kingdom) Team LNT		6	3											11
11	(United Kingdom) Team LNT		7												11
11	(Monaco) JMB Racing					7							3	6	11
12	(Slovakia) Machánek Racing	4													5
12	(Slovakia) Machánek Racing	Ret													5
12	(Hong Kong) Noble Group-GruppeM											4			5
13	(United Kingdom) Team Eurotech		5												5
13	(United Kingdom) Team Eurotech		8												5
14	(United Kingdom) Sebah Automotive			7											2
15	(United Kingdom) Cirtek Motorsport			8	Ret										1
-	(Italy) AB Motorsport	Ret													0
-	(United Kingdom) Graham Nash Motorsport	Ret													0
-	(United Kingdom) Ian Khan		Ret				Ret	Ret	Ret						0

== Manufacturers Cup ==
Points were awarded at each round to the top eight finishers in both the GT1 & GT2 classes on a 10 8 6 5 4 3 2 1 basis except for the Spa 24 Hour event were “double points” were awarded in three parts as follows:

- 5 4 3 2.5 2 1.5 1 0.5 according to the classification after six hours
- 5 4 3 2.5 2 1.5 1 0.5 according to the classification after twelve hours
- 10 8 6 5 4 3 2 1 according to the classification at the end of the race

=== GT1 Standings ===
Pos	Manufacturer	Rd 1	Rd 2	Rd 3	Rd 4	Rd 5	Rd 6	Rd 7	Rd 8	Rd 9	Rd 10	Rd 11	Total
1	(Italy) Maserati	23	26	27	15	15	42	22	26	14	17	12	239
2	(Italy) Ferrari	13	8	10	11	17	17	5	9	12	14	9	125
3	(United States) Corvette		5		10	5	8	6	4	10	6	6	60
4	(United States) Saleen	1		2	2		3	5				2	15
5	(United Kingdom) Aston Martin											10	10
6	(United Kingdom) Lister	2				2					2		6
7	(Italy) Lamborghini							1					1

=== GT2 Standings ===
Pos	Manufacturer	Rd 1	Rd 2	Rd 3	Rd 4	Rd 5	Rd 6	Rd 7	Rd 8	Rd 9	Rd 10	Rd 11	Total
1	(Germany) Porsche	29	23	25	29	29	58	29	29	29	19	25	324
2	(Italy) Ferrari		11	6		2		3	2		6	11	41
3	(Netherlands) Spyker									4	8		12
4	(United Kingdom) TVR		5	6									11

== Bibliography ==
- Asselberghs, Denis; Richardson, Frederic (2005). 2005 FIA GT Championship Annual. Brussels: Apach Media. ISBN 978-2930354330.
