= 2005 FIA GT Brno Supercar 500 =

Layout of the Brno Circuit

The 2005 FIA GT RAC Brno Supercar 500 was the fifth race for the 2005 FIA GT Championship season. It took place on 29 June 2005 at Brno.

== Official results ==
Class winners in bold. Cars failing to complete 70% of winner's distance marked as Not Classified (NC).

Pos	Class	No	Team	Drivers	Chassis	Tyre	Laps
Pos	Class	No	Team	Drivers	Engine	Tyre	Laps
1	**GT1**	**11**	**(France) Larbre Compétition**	**(Switzerland) Gabriele Gardel (Portugal) Pedro Lamy**	**Ferrari 550-GTS Maranello**	MI	**83**
1	**GT1**	**11**	**(France) Larbre Compétition**	**(Switzerland) Gabriele Gardel (Portugal) Pedro Lamy**	**Ferrari 5.9L V12**	MI	**83**
2	GT1	15	(Monaco) JMB Racing	(Italy) Andrea Bertolini (Austria) Karl Wendlinger	Maserati MC12 GT1	P	83
2	GT1	15	(Monaco) JMB Racing	(Italy) Andrea Bertolini (Austria) Karl Wendlinger	Maserati 6.0L V12	P	83
3	GT1	3	(Italy) GPC Sport	(Brazil) Jaime Melo (France) Jean-Philippe Belloc	Ferrari 575-GTC Maranello	P	83
3	GT1	3	(Italy) GPC Sport	(Brazil) Jaime Melo (France) Jean-Philippe Belloc	Ferrari 6.0L V12	P	83
4	GT1	6	(Belgium) GLPK-Carsport	(Belgium) Bert Longin (Belgium) Anthony Kumpen (Netherlands) Mike Hezemans	Chevrolet Corvette C5-R	MI	82
4	GT1	6	(Belgium) GLPK-Carsport	(Belgium) Bert Longin (Belgium) Anthony Kumpen (Netherlands) Mike Hezemans	Chevrolet LS7r 7.0L V8	MI	82
5	GT1	9	(Germany) Vitaphone Racing Team	(Germany) Michael Bartels (Germany) Timo Scheider	Maserati MC12 GT1	P	82
5	GT1	9	(Germany) Vitaphone Racing Team	(Germany) Michael Bartels (Germany) Timo Scheider	Maserati 6.0L V12	P	82
6	GT1	16	(Monaco) JMB Racing	(Austria) Philipp Peter (United Kingdom) Chris Buncombe (Russia) Roman Rusinov	Maserati MC12 GT1	P	82
6	GT1	16	(Monaco) JMB Racing	(Austria) Philipp Peter (United Kingdom) Chris Buncombe (Russia) Roman Rusinov	Maserati 6.0L V12	P	82
7	GT1	14	(United Kingdom) Lister Storm Racing	(United Kingdom) Justin Keen (United States) Liz Halliday	Lister Storm GT	D	81
7	GT1	14	(United Kingdom) Lister Storm Racing	(United Kingdom) Justin Keen (United States) Liz Halliday	Jaguar 7.0L V12	D	81
8	GT1	17	(Russia) Russian Age Racing	(France) Christophe Bouchut (Russia) Nikolai Fomenko (Russia) Alexey Vasilyev	Ferrari 550-GTS Maranello	MI	81
8	GT1	17	(Russia) Russian Age Racing	(France) Christophe Bouchut (Russia) Nikolai Fomenko (Russia) Alexey Vasilyev	Ferrari 5.9L V12	MI	81
9	**GT2**	**66**	**(United Kingdom) GruppeM Racing**	**(Germany) Marc Lieb (Germany) Mike Rockenfeller**	**Porsche 911 GT3-RSR**	MI	**81**
9	**GT2**	**66**	**(United Kingdom) GruppeM Racing**	**(Germany) Marc Lieb (Germany) Mike Rockenfeller**	**Porsche 3.6L Flat-6**	MI	**81**
10	GT1	24	(Czech Republic) Rock Media Motors	(Italy) Andrea Montermini (Czech Republic) Antonín Herbeck	Ferrari 575-GTC Maranello	P	79
10	GT1	24	(Czech Republic) Rock Media Motors	(Italy) Andrea Montermini (Czech Republic) Antonín Herbeck	Ferrari 6.0L V12	P	79
11	**G2**	**101**	**(United Kingdom) Balfe Motorsport**	**(United Kingdom) Shaun Balfe (United Kingdom) Jamie Derbyshire**	**Mosler MT900R**	D	**79**
11	**G2**	**101**	**(United Kingdom) Balfe Motorsport**	**(United Kingdom) Shaun Balfe (United Kingdom) Jamie Derbyshire**	**Chevrolet LS1 5.7L V8**	D	**79**
12	GT1	8	(United Kingdom) Graham Nash Motorsport	(Italy) Luca Pirri-Ardizzone (Czech Republic) Robert Šenkýř (United Kingdom) Ryan Hooker	Saleen S7-R	P	77
12	GT1	8	(United Kingdom) Graham Nash Motorsport	(Italy) Luca Pirri-Ardizzone (Czech Republic) Robert Šenkýř (United Kingdom) Ryan Hooker	Ford 7.0L V8	P	77
13	GT2	63	(Austria) Renauer Motorsport Team	(Germany) Wolfgang Kaufmann (Austria) Manfred Jurasz (Czech Republic) Petr Válek	Porsche 911 GT3-RS	D	77
13	GT2	63	(Austria) Renauer Motorsport Team	(Germany) Wolfgang Kaufmann (Austria) Manfred Jurasz (Czech Republic) Petr Válek	Porsche 3.6L Flat-6	D	77
14	GT2	56	(Czech Republic) Czech National Team	(Czech Republic) Jan Vonka (Italy) Mauro Casadei	Porsche 911 GT3-RS	D	76
14	GT2	56	(Czech Republic) Czech National Team	(Czech Republic) Jan Vonka (Italy) Mauro Casadei	Porsche 3.6L Flat-6	D	76
15	GT2	69	(Germany) Proton Competition	(Germany) Christian Ried (Germany) Gerold Ried	Porsche 911 GT3-RS	D	76
15	GT2	69	(Germany) Proton Competition	(Germany) Christian Ried (Germany) Gerold Ried	Porsche 3.6L Flat-6	D	76
16	GT2	57	(Slovakia) Autoracing Club Bratislava	(Slovakia) Miro Konopka (Slovakia) Andrej Studenic	Porsche 911 GT3-RSR	D	76
16	GT2	57	(Slovakia) Autoracing Club Bratislava	(Slovakia) Miro Konopka (Slovakia) Andrej Studenic	Porsche 3.6L Flat-6	D	76
17	GT1	20	(Poland) RAM Racing	(Poland) Max Stanco (Poland) Rafal Janus (Poland) Maciej Marcinkiewicz	Saleen S7-R	P	76
17	GT1	20	(Poland) RAM Racing	(Poland) Max Stanco (Poland) Rafal Janus (Poland) Maciej Marcinkiewicz	Ford 7.0L V8	P	76
18	GT2	74	(Italy) Ebimotors	(Italy) Luigi Moccia (Italy) Emanuele Busnelli	Porsche 911 GT3-RSR	D	75
18	GT2	74	(Italy) Ebimotors	(Italy) Luigi Moccia (Italy) Emanuele Busnelli	Porsche 3.6L Flat-6	D	75
19	GT2	89	(Monaco) JMB Racing	(France) Antoine Gosse (Netherlands) Peter Kutemann	Ferrari 360 Modena GTC	P	74
19	GT2	89	(Monaco) JMB Racing	(France) Antoine Gosse (Netherlands) Peter Kutemann	Ferrari 3.6L V8	P	74
20 DNF	GT2	88	(United Kingdom) GruppeM Racing	(France) Emmanuel Collard (United Kingdom) Tim Sugden	Porsche 911 GT3-RSR	MI	37
20 DNF	GT2	88	(United Kingdom) GruppeM Racing	(France) Emmanuel Collard (United Kingdom) Tim Sugden	Porsche 3.6L Flat-6	MI	37
21 DNF	GT1	10	(Germany) Vitaphone Racing Team	(Italy) Fabio Babini (Italy) Thomas Biagi	Maserati MC12 GT1	P	1
21 DNF	GT1	10	(Germany) Vitaphone Racing Team	(Italy) Fabio Babini (Italy) Thomas Biagi	Maserati 6.0L V12	P	1
22 DNF	GT1	13	(Germany) Reiter Engineering	(Netherlands) Peter Kox (Italy) Gianni Morbidelli	Lamborghini Murcielago R-GT	P	0
22 DNF	GT1	13	(Germany) Reiter Engineering	(Netherlands) Peter Kox (Italy) Gianni Morbidelli	Lamborghini 6.0L V12	P	0
23 DNF	GT1	2	(Italy) GPC Sport	(Switzerland) Jean-Denis Délétraz (Italy) Andrea Piccini	Ferrari 575-GTC Maranello	P	0
23 DNF	GT1	2	(Italy) GPC Sport	(Switzerland) Jean-Denis Délétraz (Italy) Andrea Piccini	Ferrari 6.0L V12	P	0
DNS	GT2	86	(Italy) GPC Sport	(Belgium) Stéphane Lemeret (Belgium) Loïc Deman	Ferrari 360 Modena GTC	P	0
DNS	GT2	86	(Italy) GPC Sport	(Belgium) Stéphane Lemeret (Belgium) Loïc Deman	Ferrari 3.6L V8	P	0

== Statistics ==
- Pole Position – #16 JMB Racing – 1:56.322
- Fastest Lap – #66 GruppeM Racing – 2:04.481
- Average Speed – 148.11 km/h

FIA GT Championship
Previous race: 2005 FIA GT Imola Supercar 500	2005 season	Next race: 2005 Spa 24 Hours
