= 2005 FIA GT Monza Supercar 500 =

Layout of the Autodromo Nazionale Monza

The 2005 FIA GT Monza Supercar 500 was the first race for the 2005 FIA GT Championship season. It took place on 10 April 2005 at the Autodromo Nazionale Monza.

== Official results ==
Class winners in bold. Cars failing to complete 70% of winner's distance marked as Not Classified (NC).

Pos	Class	No	Team	Drivers	Chassis	Tyre	Laps
Pos	Class	No	Team	Drivers	Engine	Tyre	Laps
1	**GT1**	**11**	**(France) Larbre Compétition**	**(Portugal) Pedro Lamy (Switzerland) Gabriele Gardel**	**Ferrari 550-GTS Maranello**	MI	**87**
1	**GT1**	**11**	**(France) Larbre Compétition**	**(Portugal) Pedro Lamy (Switzerland) Gabriele Gardel**	**Ferrari 5.9L V12**	MI	**87**
2	GT1	9	(Germany) Vitaphone Racing Team	(Germany) Michael Bartels (Germany) Timo Scheider	Maserati MC12 GT1	P	87
2	GT1	9	(Germany) Vitaphone Racing Team	(Germany) Michael Bartels (Germany) Timo Scheider	Maserati 6.0L V12	P	87
3	GT1	10	(Germany) Vitaphone Racing Team	(Italy) Fabio Babini (Italy) Thomas Biagi	Maserati MC12 GT1	P	87
3	GT1	10	(Germany) Vitaphone Racing Team	(Italy) Fabio Babini (Italy) Thomas Biagi	Maserati 6.0L V12	P	87
4	GT1	16	(Monaco) JMB Racing	(Austria) Philipp Peter (United Kingdom) Chris Buncombe (Russia) Roman Rusinov	Maserati MC12 GT1	P	86
4	GT1	16	(Monaco) JMB Racing	(Austria) Philipp Peter (United Kingdom) Chris Buncombe (Russia) Roman Rusinov	Maserati 6.0L V12	P	86
5	GT1	15	(Monaco) JMB Racing	(Italy) Andrea Bertolini (Austria) Karl Wendlinger	Maserati MC12 GT1	P	84
5	GT1	15	(Monaco) JMB Racing	(Italy) Andrea Bertolini (Austria) Karl Wendlinger	Maserati 6.0L V12	P	84
6	GT1	12	(France) Larbre Compétition	(Switzerland) Lilian Bryner (Switzerland) Enzo Calderari (Switzerland) Steve Zacchia	Ferrari 550-GTS Maranello	MI	84
6	GT1	12	(France) Larbre Compétition	(Switzerland) Lilian Bryner (Switzerland) Enzo Calderari (Switzerland) Steve Zacchia	Ferrari 5.9L V12	MI	84
7	**GT2**	**66**	**(United Kingdom) GruppeM Racing**	**(Germany) Marc Lieb (Germany) Mike Rockenfeller**	**Porsche 911 GT3-RSR**	MI	**84**
7	**GT2**	**66**	**(United Kingdom) GruppeM Racing**	**(Germany) Marc Lieb (Germany) Mike Rockenfeller**	**Porsche 3.6L Flat-6**	MI	**84**
8	GT2	88	(United Kingdom) GruppeM Racing	(France) Emmanuel Collard (United Kingdom) Tim Sugden	Porsche 911 GT3-RSR	MI	84
8	GT2	88	(United Kingdom) GruppeM Racing	(France) Emmanuel Collard (United Kingdom) Tim Sugden	Porsche 3.6L Flat-6	MI	84
9	GT1	14	(United Kingdom) Lister Storm Racing	(United Kingdom) Justin Keen (United States) Liz Halliday	Lister Storm GT	D	83
9	GT1	14	(United Kingdom) Lister Storm Racing	(United Kingdom) Justin Keen (United States) Liz Halliday	Jaguar 7.0L V12	D	83
10	GT1	7	(United Kingdom) Graham Nash Motorsport	(Italy) Paolo Ruberti (Switzerland) Joël Camathias	Saleen S7-R	P	82
10	GT1	7	(United Kingdom) Graham Nash Motorsport	(Italy) Paolo Ruberti (Switzerland) Joël Camathias	Ford 7.0L V8	P	82
11	GT2	74	(Italy) Ebimotors	(Italy) Luigi Moccia (Italy) Emanuele Busnelli	Porsche 911 GT3-RSR	P	82
11	GT2	74	(Italy) Ebimotors	(Italy) Luigi Moccia (Italy) Emanuele Busnelli	Porsche 3.6L Flat-6	P	82
12	GT1	20	(Poland) RAM Racing	(Poland) Max Stanco (Poland) Rafal Janus	Saleen S7-R	P	80
12	GT1	20	(Poland) RAM Racing	(Poland) Max Stanco (Poland) Rafal Janus	Ford 7.0L V8	P	80
13	GT2	72	(Slovakia) Machánek Racing	(Hungary) Istvan Racz (Slovakia) Josef Venč	Porsche 911 GT3-RS	P	78
13	GT2	72	(Slovakia) Machánek Racing	(Hungary) Istvan Racz (Slovakia) Josef Venč	Porsche 3.6L Flat-6	P	78
14	GT1	6	(Belgium) GLPK-Carsport	(Belgium) Bert Longin (Belgium) Anthony Kumpen (Netherlands) Mike Hezemans	Chevrolet Corvette C5-R	P	78
14	GT1	6	(Belgium) GLPK-Carsport	(Belgium) Bert Longin (Belgium) Anthony Kumpen (Netherlands) Mike Hezemans	Chevrolet LS7r 7.0L V8	P	78
15	GT1	8	(United Kingdom) Graham Nash Motorsport	(United Kingdom) Gavin Pickering (Germany) Hubert Haupt	Saleen S7-R	P	78
15	GT1	8	(United Kingdom) Graham Nash Motorsport	(United Kingdom) Gavin Pickering (Germany) Hubert Haupt	Ford 7.0L V8	P	78
16	GT2	63	(Austria) Renauer Motorsport Team	(Germany) Wolfgang Kaufmann (Austria) Manfred Jurasz	Porsche 911 GT3-RS	D	77
16	GT2	63	(Austria) Renauer Motorsport Team	(Germany) Wolfgang Kaufmann (Austria) Manfred Jurasz	Porsche 3.6L Flat-6	D	77
17	GT1	4	(Germany) Konrad Motorsport	(United Kingdom) Bobby Verdon-Roe (Netherlands) Harald Becker	Saleen S7-R	P	70
17	GT1	4	(Germany) Konrad Motorsport	(United Kingdom) Bobby Verdon-Roe (Netherlands) Harald Becker	Ford 7.0L V8	P	70
18	GT2	69	(Germany) Proton Competition	(Germany) Gerold Ried (Germany) Christian Ried	Porsche 911 GT3-RS	D	68
18	GT2	69	(Germany) Proton Competition	(Germany) Gerold Ried (Germany) Christian Ried	Porsche 3.6L Flat-6	D	68
19	GT1	3	(Italy) GPC Sport	(Brazil) Jaime Melo (France) Jean-Philippe Belloc	Ferrari 575-GTC Maranello	P	67
19	GT1	3	(Italy) GPC Sport	(Brazil) Jaime Melo (France) Jean-Philippe Belloc	Ferrari 6.0L V12	P	67
20 DNF	G2	101	(United Kingdom) Balfe Motorsport	(United Kingdom) Shaun Balfe (United Kingdom) Jamie Derbyshire	Mosler MT900R	D	59
20 DNF	G2	101	(United Kingdom) Balfe Motorsport	(United Kingdom) Shaun Balfe (United Kingdom) Jamie Derbyshire	Chevrolet LS1 5.7L V8	D	59
21 DNF	GT2	58	(Italy) AB Motorsport	(Italy) Antonio De Castro (Italy) Renato Premoli (Italy) Bruno Barbaro	Porsche 911 GT3-RSR	D	53
21 DNF	GT2	58	(Italy) AB Motorsport	(Italy) Antonio De Castro (Italy) Renato Premoli (Italy) Bruno Barbaro	Porsche 3.6L Flat-6	D	53
22 DNF	GT2	56	(Czech Republic) Vonka Racing	(Czech Republic) Jan Vonka (Italy) Daniele Amaduzzi	Porsche 911 GT3-RS	D	40
22 DNF	GT2	56	(Czech Republic) Vonka Racing	(Czech Republic) Jan Vonka (Italy) Daniele Amaduzzi	Porsche 3.6L Flat-6	D	40
23 DNF	GT1	17	(Russia) Russian Age Racing	(France) Christophe Bouchut (Russia) Nikolai Fomenko (Russia) Alexey Vasilyev	Ferrari 550-GTS Maranello	MI	37
23 DNF	GT1	17	(Russia) Russian Age Racing	(France) Christophe Bouchut (Russia) Nikolai Fomenko (Russia) Alexey Vasilyev	Ferrari 5.9L V12	MI	37
24 DNF	GT1	2	(Italy) GPC Sport	(Switzerland) Jean-Denis Délétraz (Italy) Andrea Piccini	Ferrari 575-GTC Maranello	P	37
24 DNF	GT1	2	(Italy) GPC Sport	(Switzerland) Jean-Denis Délétraz (Italy) Andrea Piccini	Ferrari 6.0L V12	P	37
25 DNF	GT1	5	(Germany) Konrad Motorsport	(Germany) Walter Lechner Jr. (Austria) Franz Konrad	Saleen S7-R	P	32
25 DNF	GT1	5	(Germany) Konrad Motorsport	(Germany) Walter Lechner Jr. (Austria) Franz Konrad	Ford 7.0L V8	P	32
26 DNF	GT1	13	(Germany) Reiter Engineering	(Netherlands) Peter Kox (Germany) Norman Simon	Lamborghini Murciélago R-GT	P	28
26 DNF	GT1	13	(Germany) Reiter Engineering	(Netherlands) Peter Kox (Germany) Norman Simon	Lamborghini 6.0L V12	P	28
27 DNF	GT2	71	(Slovakia) Machánek Racing	(Slovakia) Rudolf Machánek (Slovakia) Andrej Studenic	Porsche 911 GT3-RSR	P	24
27 DNF	GT2	71	(Slovakia) Machánek Racing	(Slovakia) Rudolf Machánek (Slovakia) Andrej Studenic	Porsche 3.6L Flat-6	P	24
28 DNF	GT2	78	(United Kingdom) Graham Nash Motorsport	(Italy) Marco Panzavuota (United Kingdom) Nigel Taylor (Canada) Tim Hauraney	Porsche 911 GT3-RSR	D	23
28 DNF	GT2	78	(United Kingdom) Graham Nash Motorsport	(Italy) Marco Panzavuota (United Kingdom) Nigel Taylor (Canada) Tim Hauraney	Porsche 3.6L Flat-6	D	23

== Statistics ==
- Pole Position – #16 JMB Racing – 1:45.699
- Fastest Lap – #10 Vitaphone Racing Team – 1:46.077
- Average Speed – 188.27 km/h

FIA GT Championship
Previous race: None	2005 season	Next race: 2005 FIA GT Magny-Cours Supercar 500
