= 2005 FIA GT Bahrain Supercar 500 =

Eleventh and final race for the 2005 FIA GT Championship season

The Grand Prix layout of the Bahrain International Circuit

The 2005 FIA GT Bahrain Supercar 500 was the eleventh and final race for the 2005 FIA GT Championship season. It took place at the Bahrain International Circuit, Bahrain, on November 25, 2005.

== Official results ==
Class winners in bold. Cars failing to complete 70% of winner's distance marked as Not Classified (NC).

Pos	Class	No	Team	Drivers	Chassis	Tyre	Laps
Pos	Class	No	Team	Drivers	Engine	Tyre	Laps
1	**GT1**	**17**	**(Russia) Russian Age Racing**	**(France) Christophe Bouchut (Spain) Antonio García**	**Aston Martin DBR9**	MI	**90**
1	**GT1**	**17**	**(Russia) Russian Age Racing**	**(France) Christophe Bouchut (Spain) Antonio García**	**Aston Martin 6.0L V12**	MI	**90**
2	GT1	16	(Monaco) JMB Racing	(Austria) Philipp Peter (United Kingdom) Jamie Davies	Maserati MC12 GT1	P	90
2	GT1	16	(Monaco) JMB Racing	(Austria) Philipp Peter (United Kingdom) Jamie Davies	Maserati 6.0L V12	P	90
3	GT1	6	(Belgium) GLPK-Carsport	(Belgium) Bert Longin (Belgium) Anthony Kumpen (Netherlands) Mike Hezemans	Chevrolet Corvette C5-R	MI	90
3	GT1	6	(Belgium) GLPK-Carsport	(Belgium) Bert Longin (Belgium) Anthony Kumpen (Netherlands) Mike Hezemans	Chevrolet LS7-R 7.0L V8	MI	90
4	GT1	11	(France) Larbre Compétition	(Switzerland) Gabriele Gardel (Portugal) Pedro Lamy	Ferrari 550-GTS Maranello	MI	90
4	GT1	11	(France) Larbre Compétition	(Switzerland) Gabriele Gardel (Portugal) Pedro Lamy	Ferrari 5.9L V12	MI	90
5	GT1	9	(Germany) Vitaphone Racing Team	(Germany) Michael Bartels (Germany) Timo Scheider	Maserati MC12 GT1	P	89
5	GT1	9	(Germany) Vitaphone Racing Team	(Germany) Michael Bartels (Germany) Timo Scheider	Maserati 6.0L V12	P	89
6	GT1	3	(Italy) GPC Sport	(Italy) Marco Cioci (Italy) Andrea Montermini	Ferrari 575-GTC Maranello	P	89
6	GT1	3	(Italy) GPC Sport	(Italy) Marco Cioci (Italy) Andrea Montermini	Ferrari 6.0L V12	P	89
7	GT1	5	(Germany) Konrad Motorsport	(Austria) Robert Lechner (Italy) Paolo Ruberti	Saleen S7-R	P	88
7	GT1	5	(Germany) Konrad Motorsport	(Austria) Robert Lechner (Italy) Paolo Ruberti	Ford 7.0L V8	P	88
8	GT1	12	(France) Larbre Compétition	(Switzerland) Steve Zacchia (France) Raymond Narac (France) Roland Bervillé	Ferrari 550-GTS Maranello	MI	88
8	GT1	12	(France) Larbre Compétition	(Switzerland) Steve Zacchia (France) Raymond Narac (France) Roland Bervillé	Ferrari 5.9L V12	MI	88
9	GT1	10	(Germany) Vitaphone Racing Team	(Italy) Fabio Babini (Italy) Thomas Biagi	Maserati MC12 GT1	P	87
9	GT1	10	(Germany) Vitaphone Racing Team	(Italy) Fabio Babini (Italy) Thomas Biagi	Maserati 6.0L V12	P	87
10	**GT2**	**66**	**(United Kingdom) GruppeM Racing**	**(Germany) Marc Lieb (Germany) Mike Rockenfeller**	**Porsche 911 GT3-RSR**	MI	**87**
10	**GT2**	**66**	**(United Kingdom) GruppeM Racing**	**(Germany) Marc Lieb (Germany) Mike Rockenfeller**	**Porsche 3.6L Flat-6**	MI	**87**
11	GT1	18	(Russia) Russian Age Racing	(Russia) Alexey Vasilyev (Russia) Nikolai Fomenko	Ferrari 550-GTS Maranello	MI	86
11	GT1	18	(Russia) Russian Age Racing	(Russia) Alexey Vasilyev (Russia) Nikolai Fomenko	Ferrari 5.9L V12	MI	86
12	GT1	4	(Germany) Konrad Motorsport	(Czech Republic) Adam Lacko (Austria) Franz Konrad	Saleen S7-R	P	85
12	GT1	4	(Germany) Konrad Motorsport	(Czech Republic) Adam Lacko (Austria) Franz Konrad	Ford 7.0L V8	P	85
13	GT2	86	(Italy) GPC Sport	(Italy) Luca Drudi (Italy) Luca Pirri-Ardizzone (Italy) Batti Pregliasco	Ferrari 360 Modena GTC	P	84
13	GT2	86	(Italy) GPC Sport	(Italy) Luca Drudi (Italy) Luca Pirri-Ardizzone (Italy) Batti Pregliasco	Ferrari 3.6L V8	P	84
14	GT2	74	(Italy) Ebimotors	(Italy) Luigi Moccia (Italy) Paolo Rapetti	Porsche 911 GT3-RSR	D	84
14	GT2	74	(Italy) Ebimotors	(Italy) Luigi Moccia (Italy) Paolo Rapetti	Porsche 3.6L Flat-6	D	84
15	GT2	97	(Netherlands) Lammertink Racing	(Germany) Wolfgang Kaufmann (Italy) Luca Moro	Porsche 911 GT3-RSR	MI	83
15	GT2	97	(Netherlands) Lammertink Racing	(Germany) Wolfgang Kaufmann (Italy) Luca Moro	Porsche 3.6L Flat-6	MI	83
16	GT2	88	(United Kingdom) GruppeM Racing	(United Kingdom) Tim Sugden (France) Emmanuel Collard	Porsche 911 GT3-RSR	MI	83
16	GT2	88	(United Kingdom) GruppeM Racing	(United Kingdom) Tim Sugden (France) Emmanuel Collard	Porsche 3.6L Flat-6	MI	83
17	GT1	2	(Italy) GPC Sport	(Switzerland) Jean-Denis Délétraz (Italy) Andrea Piccini	Ferrari 575-GTC Maranello	P	82
17	GT1	2	(Italy) GPC Sport	(Switzerland) Jean-Denis Délétraz (Italy) Andrea Piccini	Ferrari 6.0L V12	P	82
18	GT2	89	(Monaco) JMB Racing	(Netherlands) Peter Kutemann (Netherlands) Dick Waaijenberg	Ferrari 360 Modena GTC	P	81
18	GT2	89	(Monaco) JMB Racing	(Netherlands) Peter Kutemann (Netherlands) Dick Waaijenberg	Ferrari 3.6L V8	P	81
19	GT2	57	(Slovakia) Autoracing Club Bratislava	(Slovakia) Miro Konopka (Slovakia) Štefan Rosina	Porsche 911 GT3-RSR	D	81
19	GT2	57	(Slovakia) Autoracing Club Bratislava	(Slovakia) Miro Konopka (Slovakia) Štefan Rosina	Porsche 3.6L Flat-6	D	81
20	**G2**	**105**	**(Belgium) Belgian Racing**	**(Belgium) Vanina Ickx (Belgium) Bas Leinders (Belgium) Renaud Kuppens**	**Gillet Vertigo Streiff**	D	**81**
20	**G2**	**105**	**(Belgium) Belgian Racing**	**(Belgium) Vanina Ickx (Belgium) Bas Leinders (Belgium) Renaud Kuppens**	**Alfa Romeo 3.6L V6**	D	**81**
21	GT2	69	(Germany) Proton Competition	(Bahrain) Sheikh Jaber Bin Ali Al Khalifa (Germany) Gerold Ried	Porsche 911 GT3-RS	D	80
21	GT2	69	(Germany) Proton Competition	(Bahrain) Sheikh Jaber Bin Ali Al Khalifa (Germany) Gerold Ried	Porsche 3.6L Flat-6	D	80
22 DNF	GT1	14	(United Kingdom) Lister Racing	(United Kingdom) Justin Keen (United States) Liz Halliday	Lister Storm GT	D	57
22 DNF	GT1	14	(United Kingdom) Lister Racing	(United Kingdom) Justin Keen (United States) Liz Halliday	Jaguar 7.0L V12	D	57
23 DNF	GT2	56	(Czech Republic) Czech National Team	(Czech Republic) Jan Vonka (Italy) Mauro Casadei	Porsche 911 GT3-R	D	32
23 DNF	GT2	56	(Czech Republic) Czech National Team	(Czech Republic) Jan Vonka (Italy) Mauro Casadei	Porsche 3.6L Flat-6	D	32
24 DNF	GT1	15	(Monaco) JMB Racing	(Italy) Andrea Bertolini (Austria) Karl Wendlinger	Maserati MC12 GT1	P	9
24 DNF	GT1	15	(Monaco) JMB Racing	(Italy) Andrea Bertolini (Austria) Karl Wendlinger	Maserati 6.0L V12	P	9
25 DNF	GT2	90	(Netherlands) Spyker Squadron	(Netherlands) Jeroen Bleekemolen (Netherlands) Donny Crevels	Spyker C8 Spyder GT2-R	D	3
25 DNF	GT2	90	(Netherlands) Spyker Squadron	(Netherlands) Jeroen Bleekemolen (Netherlands) Donny Crevels	Audi 3.8L V8	D	3

== Statistics ==
- Pole Position – #17 Russian Age Racing – 1:54.184
- Fastest Lap – #16 JMB Racing – 1:56.478
- Average Speed – 160.830 km/h

FIA GT Championship
Previous race: 2005 FIA GT Motorcity GT 500	2005 season	Next race: "none"
