= 2005 FIA GT Imola Supercar 500 =

Layout of the Imola Circuit (1995-2006)

The 2005 FIA GT RAC Imola Supercar 500 was the fourth race for the 2005 FIA GT Championship season. It took place on 29 May 2005 at Imola.

== Official results ==
Class winners in bold. Cars failing to complete 70% of winner's distance marked as Not Classified (NC).

Pos	Class	No	Team	Drivers	Chassis	Tyre	Laps
Pos	Class	No	Team	Drivers	Engine	Tyre	Laps
1	**GT1**	**6**	**(Belgium) GLPK-Carsport**	**(Belgium) Bert Longin (Belgium) Anthony Kumpen (Netherlands) Mike Hezemans**	**Chevrolet Corvette C5-R**	MI	**97**
1	**GT1**	**6**	**(Belgium) GLPK-Carsport**	**(Belgium) Bert Longin (Belgium) Anthony Kumpen (Netherlands) Mike Hezemans**	**Chevrolet LS7r 7.0L V8**	MI	**97**
2	GT1	11	(France) Larbre Compétition	(Switzerland) Gabriele Gardel (Portugal) Pedro Lamy	Ferrari 550-GTS Maranello	MI	97
2	GT1	11	(France) Larbre Compétition	(Switzerland) Gabriele Gardel (Portugal) Pedro Lamy	Ferrari 5.9L V12	MI	97
3	GT1	10	(Germany) Vitaphone Racing Team	(Italy) Fabio Babini (Italy) Thomas Biagi	Maserati MC12 GT1	P	97
3	GT1	10	(Germany) Vitaphone Racing Team	(Italy) Fabio Babini (Italy) Thomas Biagi	Maserati 6.0L V12	P	97
4	GT1	15	(Monaco) JMB Racing	(Italy) Andrea Bertolini (Austria) Karl Wendlinger	Maserati MC12 GT1	P	97
4	GT1	15	(Monaco) JMB Racing	(Italy) Andrea Bertolini (Austria) Karl Wendlinger	Maserati 6.0L V12	P	97
5	GT1	16	(Monaco) JMB Racing	(Austria) Philipp Peter (United Kingdom) Chris Buncombe (Russia) Roman Rusinov	Maserati MC12 GT1	P	96
5	GT1	16	(Monaco) JMB Racing	(Austria) Philipp Peter (United Kingdom) Chris Buncombe (Russia) Roman Rusinov	Maserati 6.0L V12	P	96
6	GT1	3	(Italy) GPC Sport	(Brazil) Jaime Melo (France) Jean-Philippe Belloc	Ferrari 575-GTC Maranello	P	94
6	GT1	3	(Italy) GPC Sport	(Brazil) Jaime Melo (France) Jean-Philippe Belloc	Ferrari 6.0L V12	P	94
7	**GT2**	**88**	**(United Kingdom) GruppeM Racing**	**(France) Emmanuel Collard (United Kingdom) Tim Sugden**	**Porsche 911 GT3-RSR**	MI	**94**
7	**GT2**	**88**	**(United Kingdom) GruppeM Racing**	**(France) Emmanuel Collard (United Kingdom) Tim Sugden**	**Porsche 3.6L Flat-6**	MI	**94**
8	GT2	66	(United Kingdom) GruppeM Racing	(Germany) Marc Lieb (Germany) Mike Rockenfeller	Porsche 911 GT3-RSR	MI	94
8	GT2	66	(United Kingdom) GruppeM Racing	(Germany) Marc Lieb (Germany) Mike Rockenfeller	Porsche 3.6L Flat-6	MI	94
9	**G2**	**101**	**(United Kingdom) Balfe Motorsport**	**(United Kingdom) Shaun Balfe (United Kingdom) Jamie Derbyshire**	**Mosler MT900R**	D	**89**
9	**G2**	**101**	**(United Kingdom) Balfe Motorsport**	**(United Kingdom) Shaun Balfe (United Kingdom) Jamie Derbyshire**	**Chevrolet LS1 5.7L V8**	D	**89**
10	GT1	8	(United Kingdom) Graham Nash Motorsport	(Italy) Enea Casoni (Italy) Edo Varini (Italy) Marco Panzavuota	Saleen S7-R	P	88
10	GT1	8	(United Kingdom) Graham Nash Motorsport	(Italy) Enea Casoni (Italy) Edo Varini (Italy) Marco Panzavuota	Ford 7.0L V8	P	88
11	GT2	87	(Netherlands) Lammertink Racing	(Germany) Wolfgang Kaufmann (Italy) Luca Moro	Porsche 911 GT3-RSR	MI	88
11	GT2	87	(Netherlands) Lammertink Racing	(Germany) Wolfgang Kaufmann (Italy) Luca Moro	Porsche 3.6L Flat-6	MI	88
12	GT2	69	(Germany) Proton Competition	(Germany) Christian Ried (Germany) Gerold Ried	Porsche 911 GT3-RS	D	88
12	GT2	69	(Germany) Proton Competition	(Germany) Christian Ried (Germany) Gerold Ried	Porsche 3.6L Flat-6	D	88
13	GT2	74	(Italy) Ebimotors	(Italy) Luigi Moccia (Italy) Emanuele Busnelli	Porsche 911 GT3-RSR	D	87
13	GT2	74	(Italy) Ebimotors	(Italy) Luigi Moccia (Italy) Emanuele Busnelli	Porsche 3.6L Flat-6	D	87
14	GT2	56	(Czech Republic) Czech National Team	(Czech Republic) Jan Vonka (Italy) Davide Amaduzzi (Italy) Antonio De Castro	Porsche 911 GT3-RS	D	86
14	GT2	56	(Czech Republic) Czech National Team	(Czech Republic) Jan Vonka (Italy) Davide Amaduzzi (Italy) Antonio De Castro	Porsche 3.6L Flat-6	D	86
15 NC	GT1	20	(Poland) RAM Racing	(Poland) Max Stanco (Poland) Rafal Janus	Saleen S7-R	P	66
15 NC	GT1	20	(Poland) RAM Racing	(Poland) Max Stanco (Poland) Rafal Janus	Ford 7.0L V8	P	66
16 DNF	GT1	5	(Germany) Konrad Motorsport	(Austria) Robert Lechner (Italy) Matteo Bobbi	Saleen S7-R	P	46
16 DNF	GT1	5	(Germany) Konrad Motorsport	(Austria) Robert Lechner (Italy) Matteo Bobbi	Ford 7.0L V8	P	46
17 DNF	GT1	4	(Germany) Konrad Motorsport	(Germany) Harald Becker (Brazil) Antônio Hermann	Saleen S7-R	P	43
17 DNF	GT1	4	(Germany) Konrad Motorsport	(Germany) Harald Becker (Brazil) Antônio Hermann	Ford 7.0L V8	P	43
18 DNF	GT2	85	(United Kingdom) Cirtek Motorsport	(United Kingdom) Rob Wilson (United Kingdom) Joe Macari	Ferrari 360 Modena GTC	D	38
18 DNF	GT2	85	(United Kingdom) Cirtek Motorsport	(United Kingdom) Rob Wilson (United Kingdom) Joe Macari	Ferrari 3.6L V8	D	38
19 DNF	G2	105	(Belgium) Belgian Racing	(Belgium) Renaud Kuppens (Belgium) Bas Leinders	Gillet Vertigo Streiff	D	30
19 DNF	G2	105	(Belgium) Belgian Racing	(Belgium) Renaud Kuppens (Belgium) Bas Leinders	Alfa Romeo 3.6L V6	D	30
20 DNF	GT1	9	(Germany) Vitaphone Racing Team	(Germany) Michael Bartels (Germany) Timo Scheider	Maserati MC12 GT1	P	27
20 DNF	GT1	9	(Germany) Vitaphone Racing Team	(Germany) Michael Bartels (Germany) Timo Scheider	Maserati 6.0L V12	P	27
21 DNF	GT1	14	(United Kingdom) Lister Storm Racing	(United Kingdom) Justin Keen (United States) Liz Halliday	Lister Storm GT	D	22
21 DNF	GT1	14	(United Kingdom) Lister Storm Racing	(United Kingdom) Justin Keen (United States) Liz Halliday	Jaguar 7.0L V12	D	22
22 DNF	GT1	2	(Italy) GPC Sport	(Switzerland) Jean-Denis Délétraz (Italy) Andrea Piccini	Ferrari 575-GTC Maranello	P	21
22 DNF	GT1	2	(Italy) GPC Sport	(Switzerland) Jean-Denis Délétraz (Italy) Andrea Piccini	Ferrari 6.0L V12	P	21
23 DNF	GT1	7	(United Kingdom) Graham Nash Motorsport	(Italy) Paolo Ruberti (Switzerland) Joël Camathias	Saleen S7-R	P	11
23 DNF	GT1	7	(United Kingdom) Graham Nash Motorsport	(Italy) Paolo Ruberti (Switzerland) Joël Camathias	Ford 7.0L V8	P	11
24 DNF	GT1	17	(Russia) Russian Age Racing	(France) Christophe Bouchut (Russia) Nikolai Fomenko (Russia) Alexey Vasilyev	Ferrari 550-GTS Maranello	MI	3
24 DNF	GT1	17	(Russia) Russian Age Racing	(France) Christophe Bouchut (Russia) Nikolai Fomenko (Russia) Alexey Vasilyev	Ferrari 5.9L V12	MI	3

== Statistics ==
- Pole Position - #6 GLPK-Carsport - 1:45.835
- Fastest Lap - #6 GLPK-Carsport - 1:47.868
- Average Speed - 157.95 km/h

FIA GT Championship
Previous race: 2005 FIA GT Tourist Trophy	2005 season	Next race: 2005 FIA GT Brno Supercar 500
