= 2005 FIA GT Istanbul 2 Hours =

Track map of the Istanbul Park

The 2005 FIA GT Istanbul 2 Hours was the eighth race for the 2005 FIA GT Championship season. It took place on 18 September 2005 at Istanbul Park.

== Official results ==
Class winners in bold. Cars failing to complete 70% of winner's distance marked as Not Classified (NC).

Pos	Class	No	Team	Drivers	Chassis	Tyre	Laps
Pos	Class	No	Team	Drivers	Engine	Tyre	Laps
1	**GT1**	**9**	**(Germany) Vitaphone Racing Team**	**(Germany) Michael Bartels (Germany) Timo Scheider**	**Maserati MC12 GT1**	P	**59**
1	**GT1**	**9**	**(Germany) Vitaphone Racing Team**	**(Germany) Michael Bartels (Germany) Timo Scheider**	**Maserati 6.0L V12**	P	**59**
2	GT1	10	(Germany) Vitaphone Racing Team	(Italy) Fabio Babini (Italy) Thomas Biagi	Maserati MC12 GT1	P	59
2	GT1	10	(Germany) Vitaphone Racing Team	(Italy) Fabio Babini (Italy) Thomas Biagi	Maserati 6.0L V12	P	59
3	GT1	15	(Monaco) JMB Racing	(Italy) Andrea Bertolini (Austria) Karl Wendlinger	Maserati MC12 GT1	P	59
3	GT1	15	(Monaco) JMB Racing	(Italy) Andrea Bertolini (Austria) Karl Wendlinger	Maserati 6.0L V12	P	59
4	GT1	2	(Italy) GPC Sport	(Switzerland) Jean-Denis Délétraz (Italy) Andrea Piccini	Ferrari 575-GTC Maranello	P	59
4	GT1	2	(Italy) GPC Sport	(Switzerland) Jean-Denis Délétraz (Italy) Andrea Piccini	Ferrari 6.0L V12	P	59
5	GT1	6	(Belgium) GLPK-Carsport	(Belgium) Bert Longin (Belgium) Anthony Kumpen (Netherlands) Mike Hezemans	Chevrolet Corvette C5-R	MI	59
5	GT1	6	(Belgium) GLPK-Carsport	(Belgium) Bert Longin (Belgium) Anthony Kumpen (Netherlands) Mike Hezemans	Chevrolet LS7r 7.0L V8	MI	59
6	GT1	11	(France) Larbre Compétition	(Switzerland) Gabriele Gardel (Portugal) Pedro Lamy	Ferrari 550-GTS Maranello	MI	58
6	GT1	11	(France) Larbre Compétition	(Switzerland) Gabriele Gardel (Portugal) Pedro Lamy	Ferrari 5.9L V12	MI	58
7	**GT2**	**88**	**(United Kingdom) GruppeM Racing**	**(United Kingdom) Tim Sugden (France) Emmanuel Collard**	**Porsche 911 GT3-RSR**	MI	**58**
7	**GT2**	**88**	**(United Kingdom) GruppeM Racing**	**(United Kingdom) Tim Sugden (France) Emmanuel Collard**	**Porsche 3.6L Flat-6**	MI	**58**
8	GT2	66	(United Kingdom) GruppeM Racing	(Germany) Marc Lieb (Germany) Mike Rockenfeller	Porsche 911 GT3-RSR	MI	58
8	GT2	66	(United Kingdom) GruppeM Racing	(Germany) Marc Lieb (Germany) Mike Rockenfeller	Porsche 3.6L Flat-6	MI	58
9	GT1	16	(Monaco) JMB Racing	(Austria) Philipp Peter (Turkey) Can Artam (Switzerland) Christophe Pillon	Maserati MC12 GT1	P	58
9	GT1	16	(Monaco) JMB Racing	(Austria) Philipp Peter (Turkey) Can Artam (Switzerland) Christophe Pillon	Maserati 6.0L V12	P	58
10	GT1	17	(Russia) Russian Age Racing	(France) Christophe Bouchut (Russia) Nikolai Fomenko (Russia) Alexey Vasilyev	Ferrari 550-GTS Maranello	MI	57
10	GT1	17	(Russia) Russian Age Racing	(France) Christophe Bouchut (Russia) Nikolai Fomenko (Russia) Alexey Vasilyev	Ferrari 5.9L V12	MI	57
11	GT2	74	(Italy) Ebimotors	(Italy) Luigi Moccia (Italy) Emanuele Busnelli	Porsche 911 GT3-RSR	D	56
11	GT2	74	(Italy) Ebimotors	(Italy) Luigi Moccia (Italy) Emanuele Busnelli	Porsche 3.6L Flat-6	D	56
12	GT2	69	(Germany) Proton Competition	(Germany) Christian Ried (Germany) Gerold Ried	Porsche 911 GT3-RS	D	55
12	GT2	69	(Germany) Proton Competition	(Germany) Christian Ried (Germany) Gerold Ried	Porsche 3.6L Flat-6	D	55
13	GT2	56	(Czech Republic) Czech National Team	(Czech Republic) Jan Vonka (Italy) Mauro Casadei (France) Nicolas Armindo	Porsche 911 GT3-RS	D	54
13	GT2	56	(Czech Republic) Czech National Team	(Czech Republic) Jan Vonka (Italy) Mauro Casadei (France) Nicolas Armindo	Porsche 3.6L Flat-6	D	54
14	GT2	57	(Slovakia) Autoracing Club Bratislava	(Slovakia) Miro Konopka (Italy) Luigi Emiliani	Porsche 911 GT3-RSR	D	54
14	GT2	57	(Slovakia) Autoracing Club Bratislava	(Slovakia) Miro Konopka (Italy) Luigi Emiliani	Porsche 3.6L Flat-6	D	54
15	GT2	86	(Italy) GPC Sport	(Switzerland) Marco Lambertini (Belgium) Stéphane Lemeret	Ferrari 360 Modena GTC	P	45
15	GT2	86	(Italy) GPC Sport	(Switzerland) Marco Lambertini (Belgium) Stéphane Lemeret	Ferrari 3.6L V8	P	45
16	GT1	14	(United Kingdom) Lister Storm Racing	(United Kingdom) Justin Keen (United States) Liz Halliday	Lister Storm GT	D	44
16	GT1	14	(United Kingdom) Lister Storm Racing	(United Kingdom) Justin Keen (United States) Liz Halliday	Jaguar 7.0L V12	D	44
17	GT1	25	(Czech Republic) MenX	(Netherlands) Peter Kox (Czech Republic) Robert Pergl	Ferrari 550-GTS Maranello	MI	43
17	GT1	25	(Czech Republic) MenX	(Netherlands) Peter Kox (Czech Republic) Robert Pergl	Ferrari 5.9L V12	MI	43
18 DNF	GT1	4	(Germany) Konrad Motorsport	(Austria) Franz Konrad (Italy) Marco Saviozzi (Poland) Maciej Marcinkiewicz	Saleen S7-R	P	12
18 DNF	GT1	4	(Germany) Konrad Motorsport	(Austria) Franz Konrad (Italy) Marco Saviozzi (Poland) Maciej Marcinkiewicz	Ford 7.0L V8	P	12
19 DNF	GT1	5	(Germany) Konrad Motorsport	(Italy) Paolo Ruberti (Austria) Robert Lechner	Saleen S7-R	P	9
19 DNF	GT1	5	(Germany) Konrad Motorsport	(Italy) Paolo Ruberti (Austria) Robert Lechner	Ford 7.0L V8	P	9

== Statistics ==
- Pole Position – #2 GPC Sport – 1:49.611
- Fastest Lap – #10 Vitaphone Racing Team – 1:50.949
- Average Speed – 157.30 km/h

FIA GT Championship
Previous race: 2005 FIA GT Oschersleben Supercar 500	2005 season	Next race: 2005 FIA GT Zhuhai Supercar 500
