= 2005 FIA GT Oschersleben Supercar 500 =

Layout of the Motorsport Arena Oschersleben

The 2005 FIA GT RAC Brno Supercar 500 was the seventh race for the 2005 FIA GT Championship season. It took place on 28 August 2005 at the Motorsport Arena Oschersleben.

== Official results ==
Class winners in bold. Cars failing to complete 70% of winner's distance marked as Not Classified (NC).

| Pos | Class | No | Team | Drivers | Chassis | Tyre | Laps |
| Pos | Class | No | Team | Drivers | Engine | Tyre | Laps |
|---|---|---|---|---|---|---|---|
| 1 | **GT1** | **10** | **(Germany) Vitaphone Racing Team** | **(Italy) Fabio Babini (Italy) Thomas Biagi** | **Maserati MC12 GT1** | P | **121** |
| 1 | **GT1** | **10** | **(Germany) Vitaphone Racing Team** | **(Italy) Fabio Babini (Italy) Thomas Biagi** | **Maserati 6.0L V12** | P | **121** |
| 2 | GT1 | 15 | (Monaco) JMB Racing | (Italy) Andrea Bertolini (Austria) Karl Wendlinger | Maserati MC12 GT1 | P | 121 |
| 2 | GT1 | 15 | (Monaco) JMB Racing | (Italy) Andrea Bertolini (Austria) Karl Wendlinger | Maserati 6.0L V12 | P | 121 |
| 3 | GT1 | 6 | (Belgium) GLPK-Carsport | (Belgium) Bert Longin (Belgium) Anthony Kumpen (Netherlands) Mike Hezemans | Chevrolet Corvette C5-R | MI | 121 |
| 3 | GT1 | 6 | (Belgium) GLPK-Carsport | (Belgium) Bert Longin (Belgium) Anthony Kumpen (Netherlands) Mike Hezemans | Chevrolet LS7r 7.0L V8 | MI | 121 |
| 4 | GT1 | 5 | (Germany) Konrad Motorsport | (France) Jean-Marc Gounon (Austria) Robert Lechner | Saleen S7-R | P | 121 |
| 4 | GT1 | 5 | (Germany) Konrad Motorsport | (France) Jean-Marc Gounon (Austria) Robert Lechner | Ford 7.0L V8 | P | 121 |
| 5 | GT1 | 16 | (Monaco) JMB Racing | (Austria) Philipp Peter (Italy) Marcello Zani (Netherlands) Arjan van der Zwaan | Maserati MC12 GT1 | P | 121 |
| 5 | GT1 | 16 | (Monaco) JMB Racing | (Austria) Philipp Peter (Italy) Marcello Zani (Netherlands) Arjan van der Zwaan | Maserati 6.0L V12 | P | 121 |
| 6 | GT1 | 2 | (Italy) GPC Sport | (Switzerland) Jean-Denis Délétraz (Italy) Andrea Piccini | Ferrari 575-GTC Maranello | P | 120 |
| 6 | GT1 | 2 | (Italy) GPC Sport | (Switzerland) Jean-Denis Délétraz (Italy) Andrea Piccini | Ferrari 6.0L V12 | P | 120 |
| 7 | GT1 | 11 | (France) Larbre Compétition | (Switzerland) Gabriele Gardel (Portugal) Pedro Lamy | Ferrari 550-GTS Maranello | MI | 120 |
| 7 | GT1 | 11 | (France) Larbre Compétition | (Switzerland) Gabriele Gardel (Portugal) Pedro Lamy | Ferrari 5.9L V12 | MI | 120 |
| 8 | GT1 | 13 | (Germany) Reiter Engineering | (Netherlands) Peter Kox (Italy) Gianni Morbidelli | Lamborghini Murcielago R-GT | P | 120 |
| 8 | GT1 | 13 | (Germany) Reiter Engineering | (Netherlands) Peter Kox (Italy) Gianni Morbidelli | Lamborghini 6.0L V12 | P | 120 |
| 9 | **GT2** | **88** | **(United Kingdom) GruppeM Racing** | **(United Kingdom) Tim Sugden (France) Emmanuel Collard** | **Porsche 911 GT3-RSR** | MI | **118** |
| 9 | **GT2** | **88** | **(United Kingdom) GruppeM Racing** | **(United Kingdom) Tim Sugden (France) Emmanuel Collard** | **Porsche 3.6L Flat-6** | MI | **118** |
| 10 | GT2 | 66 | (United Kingdom) GruppeM Racing | (Germany) Marc Lieb (Germany) Mike Rockenfeller | Porsche 911 GT3-RSR | MI | 117 |
| 10 | GT2 | 66 | (United Kingdom) GruppeM Racing | (Germany) Marc Lieb (Germany) Mike Rockenfeller | Porsche 3.6L Flat-6 | MI | 117 |
| 11 | GT1 | 14 | (United Kingdom) Lister Storm Racing | (United Kingdom) Justin Keen (United States) Liz Halliday | Lister Storm GT | D | 117 |
| 11 | GT1 | 14 | (United Kingdom) Lister Storm Racing | (United Kingdom) Justin Keen (United States) Liz Halliday | Jaguar 7.0L V12 | D | 117 |
| 12 | GT1 | 4 | (Germany) Konrad Motorsport | (Austria) Franz Konrad (Germany) Sebastian Stahl (Brazil) Antônio Hermann | Saleen S7-R | P | 115 |
| 12 | GT1 | 4 | (Germany) Konrad Motorsport | (Austria) Franz Konrad (Germany) Sebastian Stahl (Brazil) Antônio Hermann | Ford 7.0L V8 | P | 115 |
| 13 | GT1 | 17 | (Russia) Russian Age Racing | (France) Christophe Bouchut (Russia) Nikolai Fomenko (Russia) Alexey Vasilyev | Ferrari 550-GTS Maranello | MI | 114 |
| 13 | GT1 | 17 | (Russia) Russian Age Racing | (France) Christophe Bouchut (Russia) Nikolai Fomenko (Russia) Alexey Vasilyev | Ferrari 5.9L V12 | MI | 114 |
| 14 | **G2** | **101** | **(United Kingdom) Balfe Motorsport** | **(United Kingdom) Shaun Balfe (United Kingdom) Jamie Derbyshire** | **Mosler MT900R** | D | **113** |
| 14 | **G2** | **101** | **(United Kingdom) Balfe Motorsport** | **(United Kingdom) Shaun Balfe (United Kingdom) Jamie Derbyshire** | **Chevrolet LS1 5.7L V8** | D | **113** |
| 15 | GT2 | 69 | (Germany) Proton Competition | (Germany) Christian Ried (Germany) Gerold Ried | Porsche 911 GT3-RS | D | 110 |
| 15 | GT2 | 69 | (Germany) Proton Competition | (Germany) Christian Ried (Germany) Gerold Ried | Porsche 3.6L Flat-6 | D | 110 |
| 16 | GT2 | 56 | (Czech Republic) Czech National Team | (Czech Republic) Jan Vonka (Italy) Mauro Casadei (Finland) Jari Nurminen | Porsche 911 GT3-RS | D | 110 |
| 16 | GT2 | 56 | (Czech Republic) Czech National Team | (Czech Republic) Jan Vonka (Italy) Mauro Casadei (Finland) Jari Nurminen | Porsche 3.6L Flat-6 | D | 110 |
| 17 | GT1 | 3 | (Italy) GPC Sport | (Brazil) Jaime Melo (France) Jean-Philippe Belloc | Ferrari 575-GTC Maranello | P | 107 |
| 17 | GT1 | 3 | (Italy) GPC Sport | (Brazil) Jaime Melo (France) Jean-Philippe Belloc | Ferrari 6.0L V12 | P | 107 |
| 18 | GT2 | 74 | (Italy) Ebimotors | (Italy) Luigi Moccia (Italy) Emanuele Busnelli | Porsche 911 GT3-RSR | D | 106 |
| 18 | GT2 | 74 | (Italy) Ebimotors | (Italy) Luigi Moccia (Italy) Emanuele Busnelli | Porsche 3.6L Flat-6 | D | 106 |
| 19 | GT2 | 86 | (Italy) GPC Sport | (Switzerland) Tiziano Carugati (Switzerland) Claude Terrier | Ferrari 360 Modena GTC | P | 102 |
| 19 | GT2 | 86 | (Italy) GPC Sport | (Switzerland) Tiziano Carugati (Switzerland) Claude Terrier | Ferrari 3.6L V8 | P | 102 |
| 20 | GT1 | 9 | (Germany) Vitaphone Racing Team | (Germany) Michael Bartels (Germany) Timo Scheider | Maserati MC12 GT1 | P | 97 |
| 20 | GT1 | 9 | (Germany) Vitaphone Racing Team | (Germany) Michael Bartels (Germany) Timo Scheider | Maserati 6.0L V12 | P | 97 |
| 21 DNF | GT2 | 87 | (Netherlands) Lammertink Racing | (Germany) Wolfgang Kaufmann (Italy) Luca Moro | Porsche 911 GT3-RSR | MI | 45 |
| 21 DNF | GT2 | 87 | (Netherlands) Lammertink Racing | (Germany) Wolfgang Kaufmann (Italy) Luca Moro | Porsche 3.6L Flat-6 | MI | 45 |
| 22 DNF | GT1 | 23 | (Germany) Wieth Racing | (Denmark) Thomas Serwin (Germany) Hubert Haupt | Ferrari 550 GTS-Maranello | D | 23 |
| 22 DNF | GT1 | 23 | (Germany) Wieth Racing | (Denmark) Thomas Serwin (Germany) Hubert Haupt | Ferrari 6.0L V12 | D | 23 |
| 23 DNF | GT1 | 20 | (Poland) RAM Racing | (Poland) Max Stanco (Poland) Rafal Janus (Czech Republic) Adam Lacko | Saleen S7-R | P | 10 |
| 23 DNF | GT1 | 20 | (Poland) RAM Racing | (Poland) Max Stanco (Poland) Rafal Janus (Czech Republic) Adam Lacko | Ford 7.0L V8 | P | 10 |

== Statistics ==
- Pole Position – #9 Vitaphone Racing Team – 1:22.991
- Fastest Lap – #6 GLPK-Carsport – 1:24.837
- Average Speed – 149.16 km/h

FIA GT Championship
| Previous race: 2005 Spa 24 Hours | 2005 season | Next race: 2005 FIA GT Istanbul 2 Hours |
