= Andřej Studenič =

Slovak race car driver (born 1977)

Andřej Studenič (born 18 June 1977, in Bratislava) is a Slovak racing driver.

== Career ==
Studenič started his hillclimb career in 1993, competing at a professional level until 1998 when he made the move to full-time circuit racing. He joined the Central European Touring Car Championship in 1997 with the Audi team, moving to Super Tourenwagen Cup in 1999.

After a quiet 2000, Studenič returned to drive part of the German V8Star Series season in 2001, competing sparsely in 2002 with one FIA GT Championship race in N-GT class for Machanek Porsche. He won the 2001 ME FIA Trophy series race held in Hungary. He joined the Porsche Supercup for 2003 and 2004, and in 2005, he competed in GT2 of the FIA GT Championship again, with Rudolf Machánek. In 2004, Studenič won the European champion in the FIA-CEZ Trophy series.

== Racing record ==
=== Complete Super Tourenwagen Cup results ===
(key) (Races in bold indicate pole position) (Races in italics indicate fastest lap)

Year	Team	Car	1	2	3	4	5	6	7	8	9	10	11	12	13	14	15	16	17	18	19	20	DC	Pts
1999	National Team Slovakia	Audi A4 Quattro	SAC; 1; 12	SAC; 2 Ret	ZWE; 1; 11	ZWE; 2 Ret	OSC; 1; 12	OSC; 2; 9	NOR; 1; 10	NOR; 2; 10	MIS; 1; 10	MIS; 2; 10	NÜR; 1; 6	NÜR; 2; 9	SAL; 1; 16	SAL; 2; 12	OSC; 1; 16	OSC; 2; 8	HOC; 1; 9	HOC; 2; 8	NÜR; 1; 15	NÜR; 2; 9	12th	277
