= Jan Vonka =

Czech auto racing driver and team owner (born 1963)

Jan Vonka (born May 17, 1963 in Slaný) is a Czech auto racing driver and team owner.

== Career ==
Vonka originally competed in rallying in the early 1980s, before moving on to hillclimbing. In 1999, he won the Czech Circuit Racing Championship with his Vonka Racing team.

Vonka began competing in the N-GT class of the FIA GT Championship in 2002. He began competing more regularly in FIA GT in 2004, when he finished ninth overall in class, improving to finish sixth overall in class in 2005. In 2006, Vonka competed at the 12 Hours of Sebring. He also raced for Wiechers-Sport at the FIA WTCC Race of the Czech Republic.

=== Complete WTCC results ===
(key) (Races in bold indicate pole position) (Races in italics indicate fastest lap)

Year	Team	Car	1	2	3	4	5	6	7		8	9	10	Position	Points
2006	Wiechers-Sport	BMW 320si	MON (Italy)	MGN (France)	BRA (United Kingdom)	OSC (Germany)	CUR (Brazil)	PUE (Mexico)	BRN (Czech Republic)		IST (Turkey)	VAL (Spain)	MAC (Macau)	NC	0
2006	Wiechers-Sport	BMW 320si							Ret	21				NC	0
