= Justin Keen (racing driver) =

British racing driver (born 1972)

Justin Keen (born 4 August 1972 in Epping) is a British auto racing driver.

== Career ==
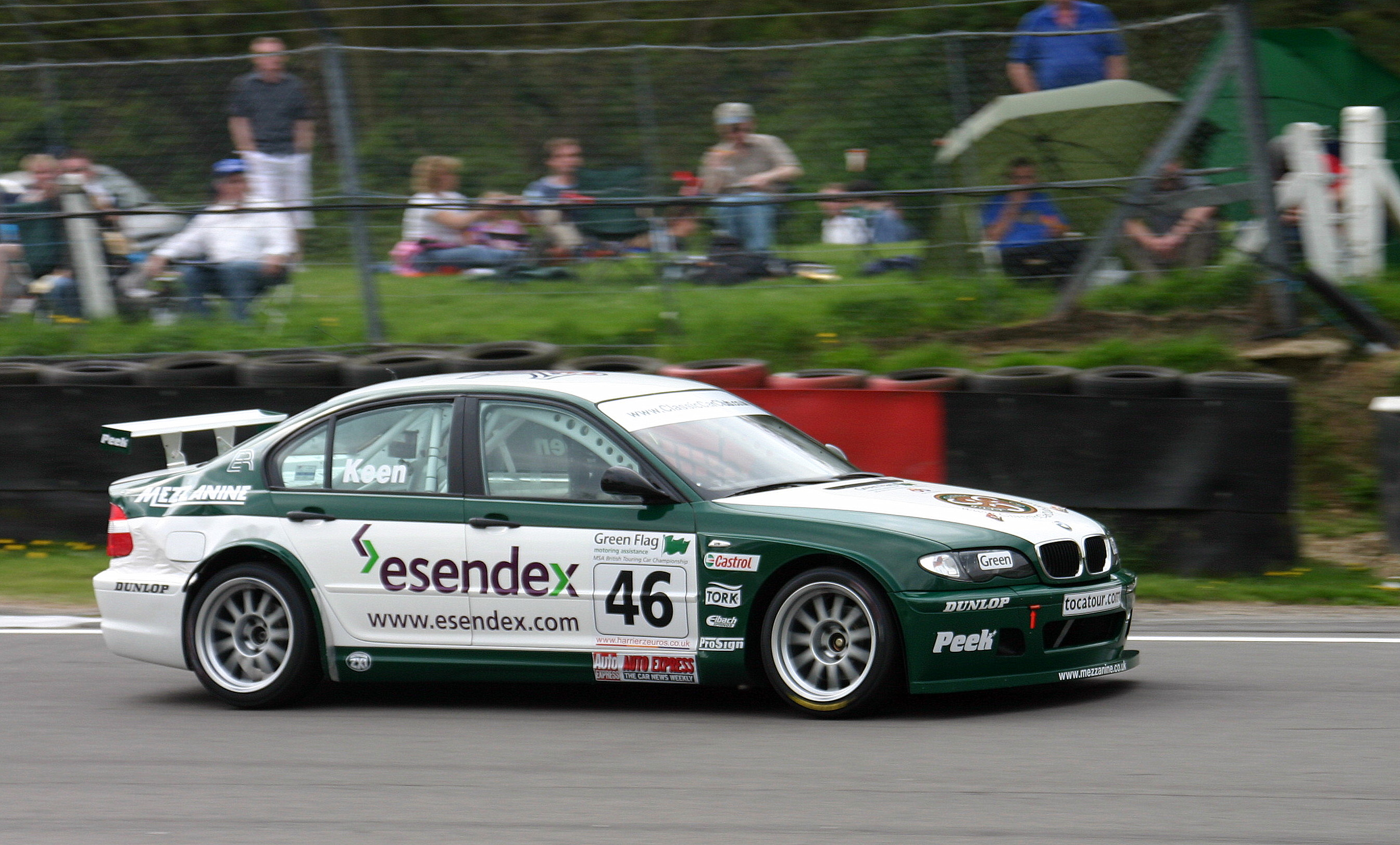
Keen driving the Edenbridge Racing BMW 320i at Brands Hatch during the 2004 British Touring Car Championship season.

Keen first started racing in 1992 with Formula Vauxhall for the Jim Russell racing school. He won the Championship against James Thompson and Jan Magnussen before moving on to the British Formula Ford Championship in 1993. In his second year, in Formula Ford he was appointed the Duckhams Works Van Diemen driver and finished third overall, including five race wins.

Keen spent time racing in the US with the USAC Formula Ford 2000 Championship in 1996 and won his first oval race at the Walt Disney track. Following an injury, he did not return to racing again until 1998 with the Caterham Challenge winning three out four races. He went on to compete in Formula Palmer Audi and finished runner up after missing two races. International Formula 3000 followed and saw Keen driving for the Minardi Junior team scoring their best finishes of the year.

In 2003, Keen switched to racing in sports cars. He competed in events such as the 24 Hours of Daytona, 24 Hours of Le Mans and the 12 Hours of Sebring. The following year saw him enter the British Touring Car Championship for Edenbridge Racing in a BMW 320i, but he pulled out of the season early due to difficulties with development. In 2005, he became a Works Lister Storm driver and credited the team with many top six finishes in the FIA GT1 championship partnering Liz Haliday, he had the fastest lap at the 2005 Spa 24-hour race before the team retired. Driving the LMP1 car, Keen was often credited with running as fast as the Audi in various LMS 1000k races but reliability was not the Lister's strong point.

Keen retired in 2006 from driving and went into driver management.

== Racing record ==
=== Complete International Formula 3000 results ===
(key) (Races in bold indicate pole position) (Races in italics indicate fastest lap)

Year	Entrant	1	2	3	4	5	6	7	8	9	10	11	12	DC	Points
2001	Kid Jensen Racing	INT; 16	IMO; 12	CAT	A1R	MON	NÜR	MAG	SIL	HOC	HUN	SPA	MNZ	NC	0
2002	European Minardi F3000	INT	IMO	CAT	A1R	MON	NUR	SIL	MAG	HOC	HUN; 9	SPA; 9	MNZ; Ret	NC	0

=== Complete British GT Championship results ===
(key) (Races in bold indicate pole position) (Races in italics indicate fastest lap)

Year	Team	Car	Class	1	2	3	4	5	6	7	8	9	10	11	12	Pos	Points
2000	NCK Motorsport	Marcos LM600	GT	THR; 1	CRO; 1	OUL; 1	DON; 1	SIL; 1	BRH; 1	DON; 1	CRO; 1 Ret	SIL; 1	SNE; 1	SPA; 1	SIL; 1	NC	0

=== Complete British Touring Car Championship results ===
(key) (Races in bold indicate pole position - 1 point awarded in first race) (Races in italics indicate fastest lap - 1 point awarded all races) (* signifies that driver lead race for at least one lap - 1 point awarded all races)

Year	Team	Car	1	2	3	4	5	6	7	8	9	10	11	12	13	14	15	16	17	18	19	20	21	22	23	24	25	26	27	28	29	30	DC	Pts
2004	Edenbridge Racing	BMW 320i	THR; 1	THR; 2	THR; 3	BRH; 1; 13	BRH; 2; 9	BRH; 3 Ret	SIL; 1; 14	SIL; 2; 18	SIL; 3; 16	OUL; 1 Ret	OUL; 2; 15	OUL; 3 Ret	MON; 1	MON; 2	MON; 3	CRO; 1	CRO; 2	CRO; 3	KNO; 1	KNO; 2	KNO; 3	BRH; 1	BRH; 2	BRH; 3	SNE; 1	SNE; 2	SNE; 3	DON; 1	DON; 2	DON; 3	**19th**	**2**
