= Gabriele Gardel =

Swiss racing driver (born 1977)

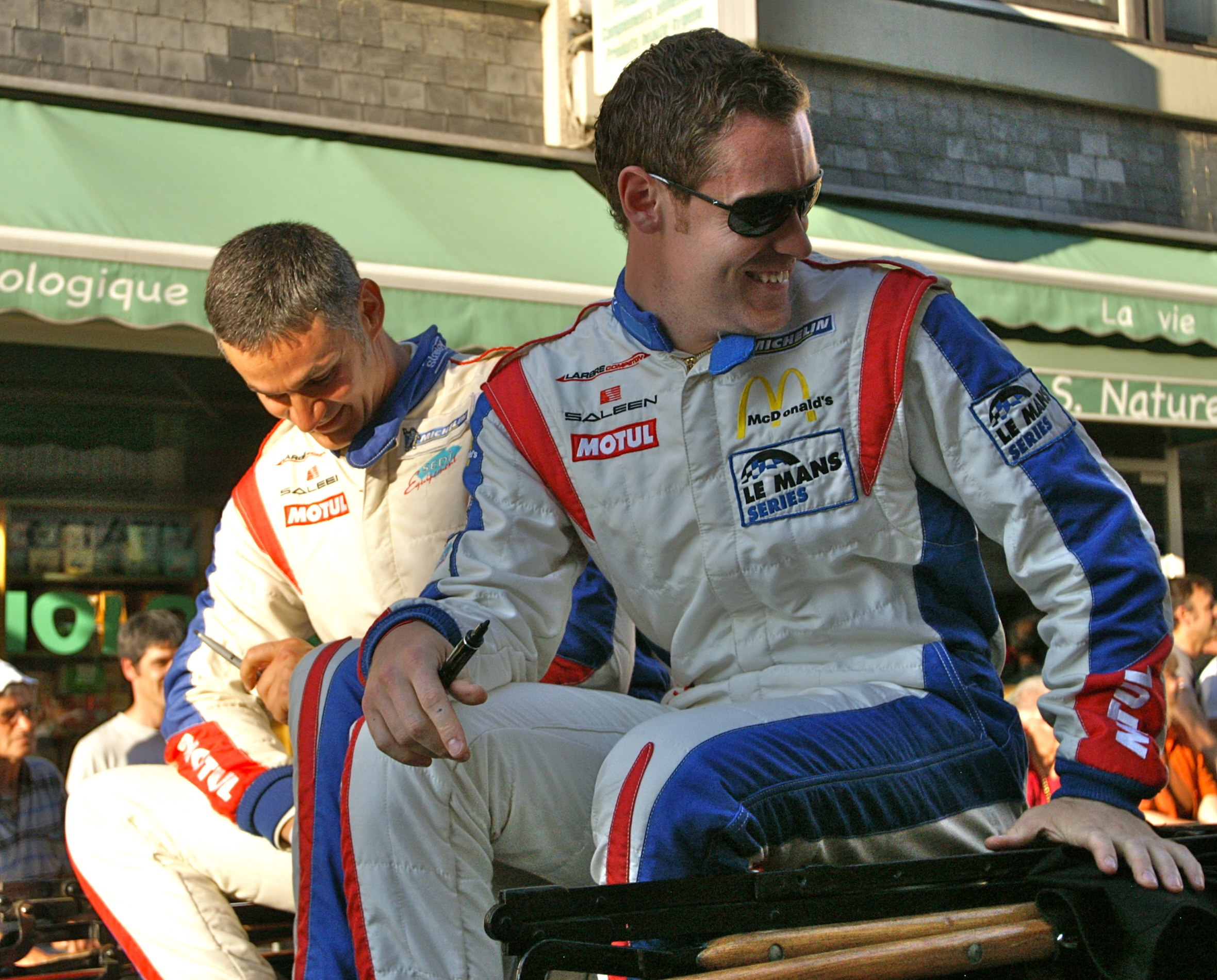
- Gardel (right) and Bervillé in the 2010 24 Hours of Le Mans Driver's Parade
- Nationality: (Switzerland) Swiss
- Born: 22 October 1977 (age 49) Milan, Italy

Blancpain Endurance Series career
- Debut season: 2012
- Categorisation: FIA Gold (until 2013); FIA Silver (2014–2019)

Previous series
- 2003–05 2006–07, 2010: FIA GT Championship; Le Mans Series

Championship titles
- 2005 2006: FIA GT Championship GT1; Le Mans Series GT1

Gabriele Gardel (born 22 October 1977 in Milan, Italy) is a Swiss former racing driver. Having competed in sports cars for most of his career, Gardel won the 2005 FIA GT Championship driver's title, and took home two class victories at the 24 Hours of Le Mans in 2010 and 2011.

== Early career ==
Gardel started in karting, racing between 1990 and 1995. He stepped up to junior formula in 1995, competing in Formula Ford with a best finish of fourth. Between 1996 and 1998, Gardel participated in the Italian Formula Three Championship. In his first season, he was awarded the best driver under 21 years old. In 1999, Gardel moved to the German Formula Three Championship with Junior Team Benetton, where he achieved a best finish of fourth. Gardel competed in the Euroseries 3000 championship from 2000 to 2002, where he would only score three times during that span, with a best finish of ninth in the standings in 2001.

== Sports car career ==
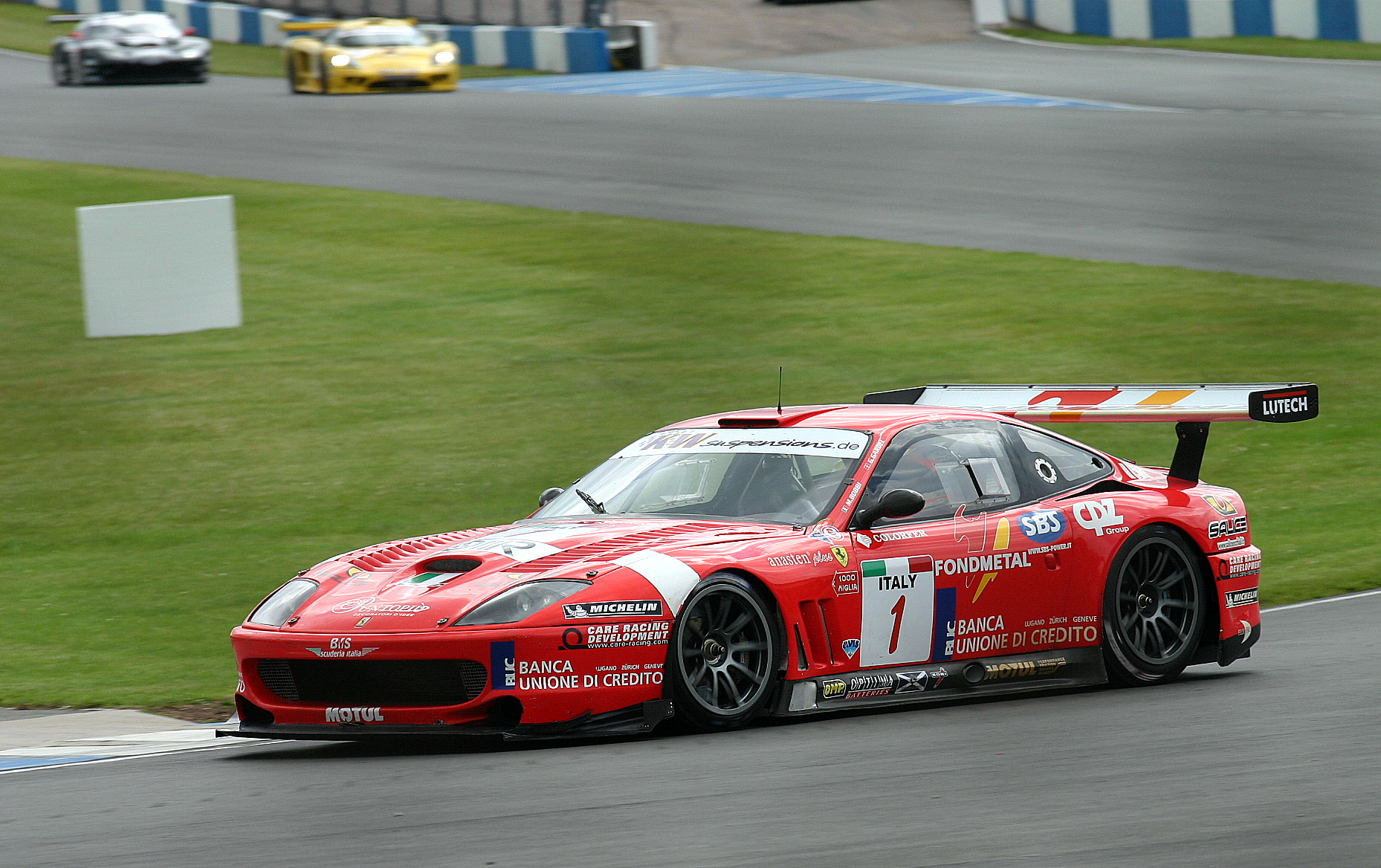
Gardel drove the Ferrari 550-GTS Maranello (pictured in 2004) in the FIA GT Championship for two seasons, winning the driver's title in 2005.

Gardel began his sports car career in the 2003 FIA GT Championship, driving a Porsche 911 GT3-RS in the N-GT class with Freisinger Motorsport. Paired with Bert Longin, and joined by Jeffrey van Hooydonk and Guillaume Gomez at the Spa 24 Hours, they were 12th in the standings, with a podium at Donington Park.

Gardel was promoted to the GT class the following season, joining BMS Scuderia Italia for the 2004 FIA GT Championship driving a Ferrari 550-GTS Maranello with Matteo Bobbi. Together, they earned two wins and a total of seven podiums that year, enough to finish second in the overall standings. For the 2005 FIA GT Championship, Gardel joined Larbre Compétition and raced together with Pedro Lamy. The team's consistency allowed them to lead the points throughout the season, however, Lamy would not be with him at the 2005 FIA GT Tourist Trophy in Silverstone Circuit nor the 2005 Spa 24 Hours as he would race for Aston Martin. Despite Lamy being victorious at Silverstone, the Aston Martins were exempt from scoring points that year, allowing Gardel to become the sole champion.

Gardel moved to the Le Mans Series for 2006, now driving the Aston Martin DBR9 with Lamy and Vincent Vosse. The trio won the GT1 class championship that year with two wins and three total podiums. He would finish in fifth the following season in 2007. For 2008, Gardel raced Daytona Prototypes the Rolex Sports Car Series with Doran Racing. He also raced in the Porsche Carrera Cup Italy in 2009. Gardel returned to Larbre Compétition for 2010, competing in the 2010 Le Mans Series and 2010 Intercontinental Le Mans Cup. Driving a Saleen S7-R, he won the GT1 class titles in both series. That year, he also took home a class victory at the 2010 24 Hours of Le Mans with Larbre and the S7-R alongside Julien Canal and Roland Bervillé. Gardel won another ILMC class title in 2011 and a class win at the 2011 24 Hours of Le Mans with a Chevrolet Corvette C6.R.

Between 2012 and 2015, Gardel would race in the Blancpain Endurance Series with Emil Frey Racing. He would also race in the 2012 International GT Open, 2013 Italian GT Championship, and the 2014 NASCAR Whelen Euro Series.

== Motorsport results ==
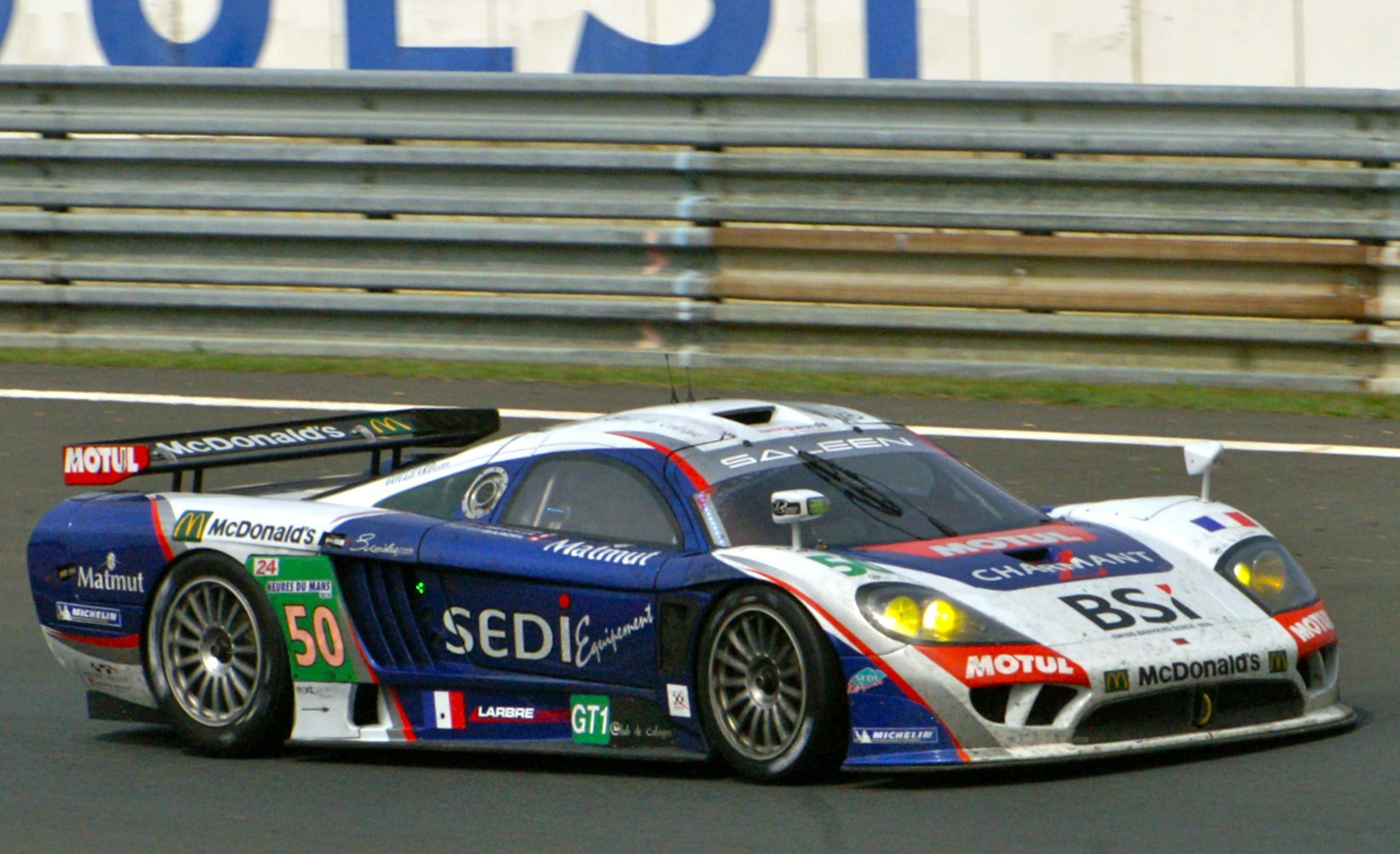
Gardel won the 2010 24 Hours of Le Mans with the Saleen S7-R in the GT1 class, with Julien Canal and Roland Bervillé.

=== Complete FIA GT Championship results ===
(key) (Races in bold indicate pole position) (Races in italics indicate fastest lap)

Year	Team	Car	Class	1	2	3	4	5	6	7	8	9	10	11	Pos.	Pts
2003	Freisinger Motorsport	Porsche 911 GT3-RS	N-GT	BAR; Ret	MAG; 4	PER; Ret	BRN; 6	DON; 3	SPA; Ret	AND; 5	OSC; 8	EST; 12	MON; 10		12th	19
2004	BMS Scuderia Italia	Ferrari 550-GTS Maranello	GT	MON; 2	VAL; 2	MAG; 4	HOC; 1	BRN; 11	DON; 4	SPA; 3	IMO; 4	OSC; 4	DUB; 1	ZHU; 3	2nd	74.5
2005	Larbre Compétition	Ferrari 550-GTS Maranello	GT1	MNZ; 1	MAG; 5	SIL; 4	IMO; 2	BRN; 1	SPA; 3	OSC; 7	IST; 6	ZHU; 2	DUB; 1	BHR; 4	1st	75
2006	GPC Sport	Ferrari F430 GTC	GT2	SIL	BRN	OSC	SPA; Ret	PRI	DIJ	MUG	HUN	ADR	DUB		20th	6

=== 24 Hours of Le Mans results ===
Year	Team	Co-Drivers	Car	Class	Laps	Pos.	Class Pos.
2006	(France) Larbre Compétition	(France) Jean-Luc Blanchemain (France) Patrick Bornhauser	Ferrari 550-GTS Maranello	GT1	222	DNF	DNF
2010	(France) Larbre Compétition	(France) Roland Bervillé (France) Julien Canal	Saleen S7-R	GT1	331	13th	**1st**
2011	(France) Larbre Compétition	(France) Patrick Bornhauser (France) Julien Canal	Chevrolet Corvette C6.R	GTE; Am	302	20th	**1st**

=== NASCAR ===
(key) (Bold – Pole position awarded by qualifying time. Italics – Pole position earned by points standings or practice time. * – Most laps led.)

==== Whelen Euro Series – Elite 2 ====
NASCAR Whelen Euro Series – Elite 2 results
Year	Team	No.	Make	1	2	3	4	5	6	7	8	9	10	11	12	NWES	Pts	Ref
2014	PK Carsport	11	Chevy	VAL	VAL	BRH	BRH	TOU	TOU	NÜR	NÜR	UMB	UMB	BUG; 4	BUG; 1	–	–	
2016	PK Carsport	24	Chevy	VAL; 4	VAL; 23	VEN; 11	VEN; 4	BRH; 23	BRH; 6	TOU; 5	TOU; 5	ADR; 1	ADR; 2	ZOL; 1	ZOL; 5	2nd	604	

Sporting positions
Preceded by Fabrizio Gollin; Luca Cappellari	FIA GT Champion; 2005	Succeeded by Andrea Bertolini; Michael Bartels
