= Larbre Compétition =

Racing team competing in GT championships

(France) Larbre Compétition
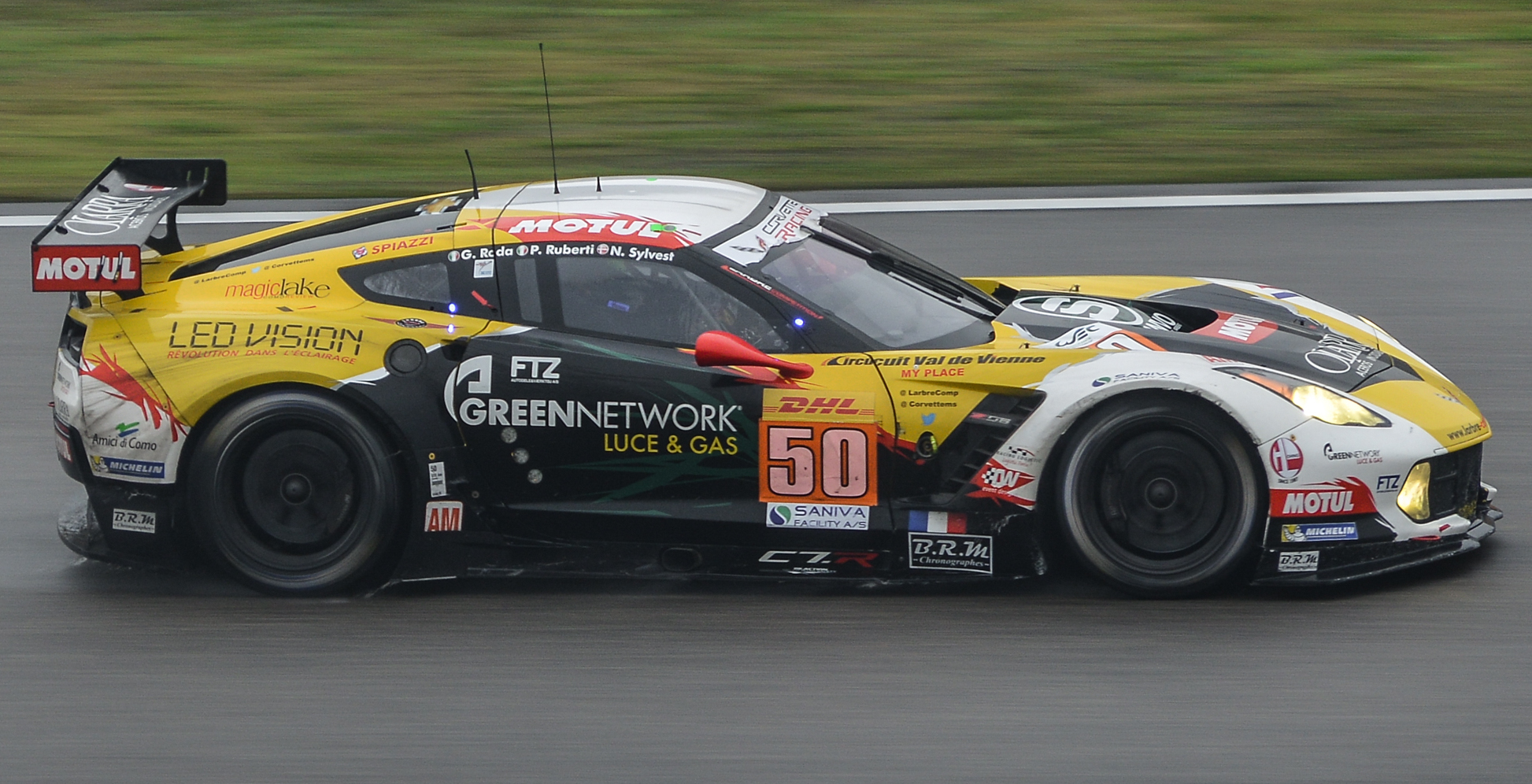
- Founded: 1988
- Base: Le Vigeant, France
- Founder(s): Jack Leconte
- Former series: European Le Mans Series; FFSA GT Championship; FIA GT Championship; FIA World Endurance Championship; Intercontinental Le Mans Cup
- Noted drivers: (France) Jean-Philippe Belloc (France) Patrick Bornhauser (France) Christophe Bouchut (France) Sébastien Bourdais (France) Julien Canal (Switzerland) Gabriele Gardel (France) Patrice Goueslard (Portugal) Pedro Lamy (Brazil) Fernando Rees (Italy) Paolo Ruberti (United States) Ricky Taylor (France) David Terrien
- Teams' Championships: 2000 FIA GT N-GT, 2001, 2002 FIA GT, 2004 LMES LMGTS, 2006, 2010 LMS LMGT1, 2010 ILMC GT1, 2011 ILMC LMGTE Am, 2012 FIA WEC LMGTE Am
- Drivers' Championships: 1997, 2003, 2008, 2010 FFSA GT, 2001, 2000 FIA GT N-GT, 2002, 2005 FIA GT, 2004 LMES LMGTS
- Website: https://www.larbre-competition.com/

Larbre Compétition is a French auto racing team founded in 1988 by racing driver Jack Leconte and based at the Circuit du Val de Vienne in Le Vigeant, France.

The team has had considerable success in a number of sports car racing series and major events, including title wins in the FIA World Endurance Championship, FIA GT Championship, and FFSA GT Championship, as well as multiple GT class wins at the 24 Hours of Le Mans. Larbre has previously competed with Porsche, Chrysler, Ferrari, Aston Martin, and Chevrolet race cars, having won at least one championship with all of them.

== Racing history ==
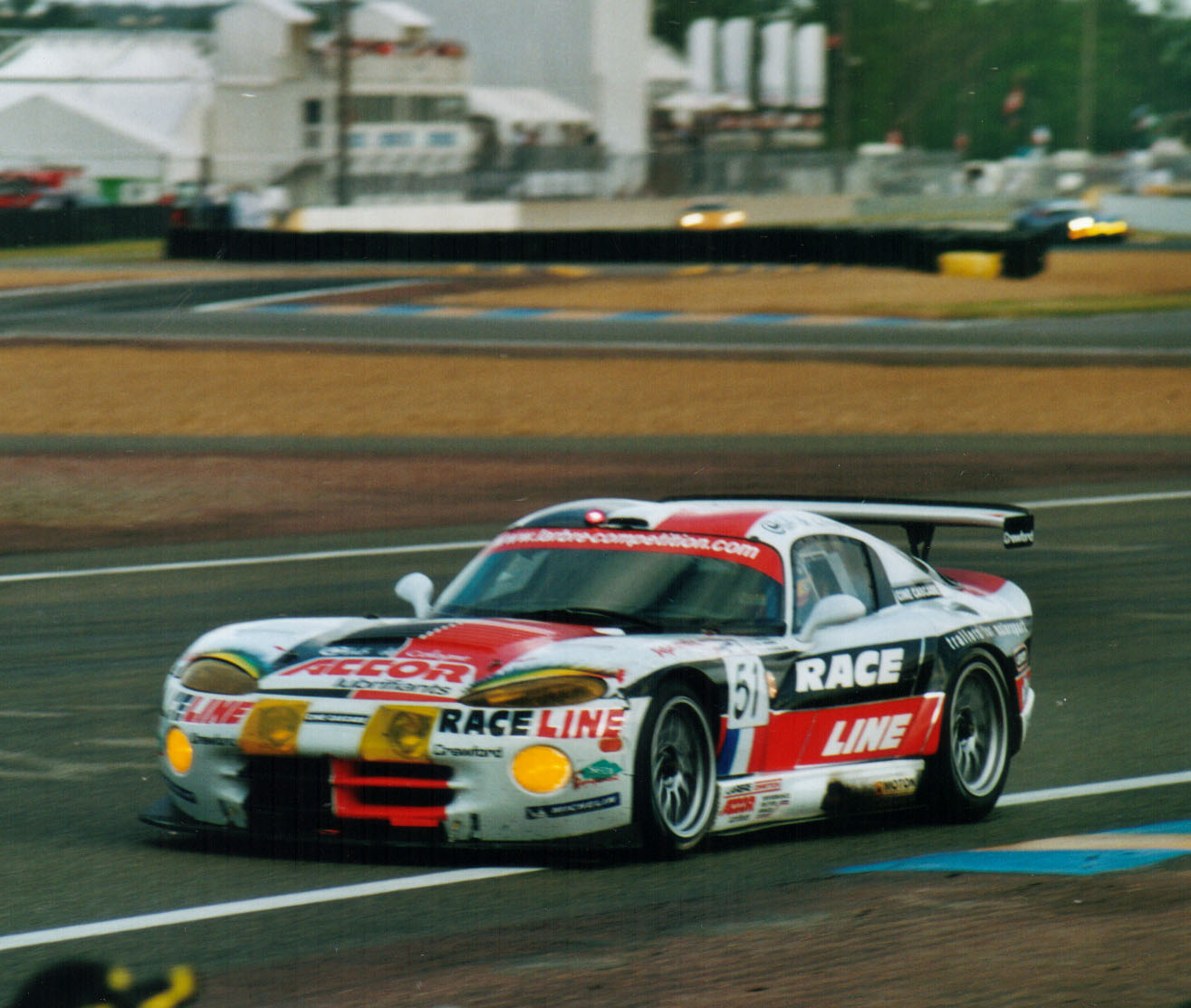
Larbre Compétition's Chrysler Viper GTS-R, which they ran from 2001 to 2003.

For 2008, Larbre chose to enlist Saleen S7-Rs for the Le Mans Series and FFSA GT Championship. The team continued with the GT1 Saleens during the 2009 LMS season, but ACO denied an entry from them for the 2009 24 Hours of Le Mans.

For 2010, Larbre competed once again with the 10-year-old S7-R in the Le Mans Series, with drivers Fernando Rees, Gabriele Gardel and Patrice Goueslard. In 2010 24 Hours of Le Mans the team took the last LMGT1 class win with the aging Saleen S7-R, as well championship victories from both Le Mans Series and Intercontinental Le Mans Cup.

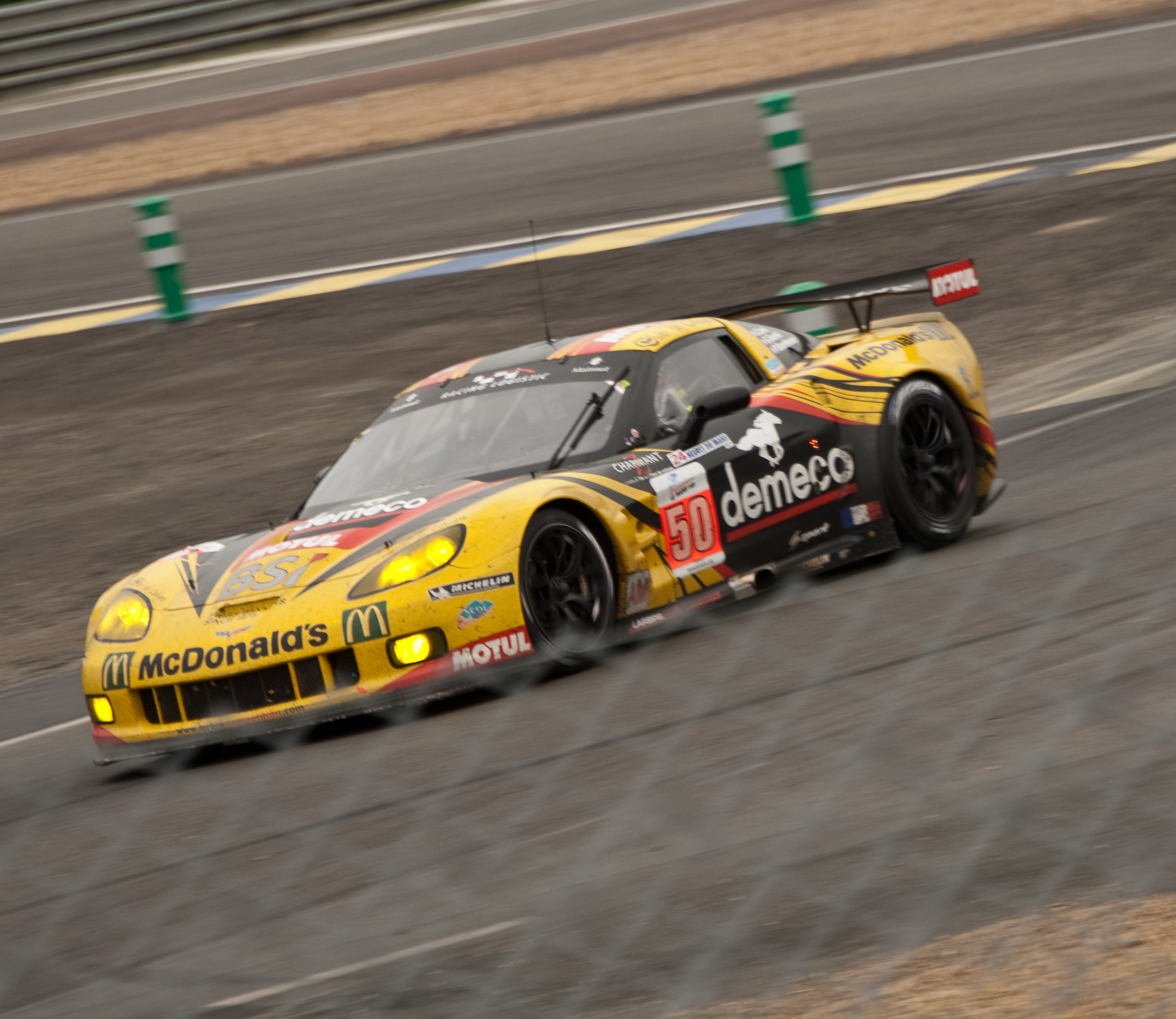
Larbre's GTE-Am class-winning Corvette C6.R at the 2011 24 Hours of Le Mans.

In 2011, the GT1 class got axed from ACO-sanctioned racing, and the old GT2 category (renamed as GTE) became the premier GT class. The team entered a Chevrolet Corvette C6.R into the GTE-Am division of the Le Mans Series and 24 Hours of Le Mans. The team won the GTE-Am category of the 2011 24 Hours of Le Mans with the Corvette and also took the second place with Porsche GT3 RSR. They also won the ILMC GTE-AM championship and thus became the first team to win a professional championship with a GT2-spec Corvette C6.R.

In 2012 and 2013, Larbre competed in the FIA World Endurance Championship with two GTE-Am class Corvette C6.Rs.

For 2014, Larbre competed in the first race of the European Le Mans Series season, the 4 Hours of Silverstone, with Keiko Ihara and Gustavo Yacamán driving a Morgan LMP2. The team also competed in the 24 Hours of Le Mans as an ELMS entry with the addition of Ricky Taylor.

For 2015, Larbre competed with a Chevrolet Corvette C7.R in the GTE-Am class of the FIA World Endurance Championship with drivers Gianluca Roda, Paolo Ruberti, Kristian Poulsen, and Nicolai Sylvest. The team returned in the FIA World Endurance Championship in 2016, again with a Corvette C7.R racing in GTE-Am, consisting of Yatuka Yamagishi, Pierre Ragues, and Paolo Ruberti.

Larbre Compétition's latest ventures would be at the 2019 24 Hours of Le Mans in the LMP2 class, finishing 12th in class, and the 2022 Gulf Historic Dubai GP Revival.

== Race results ==
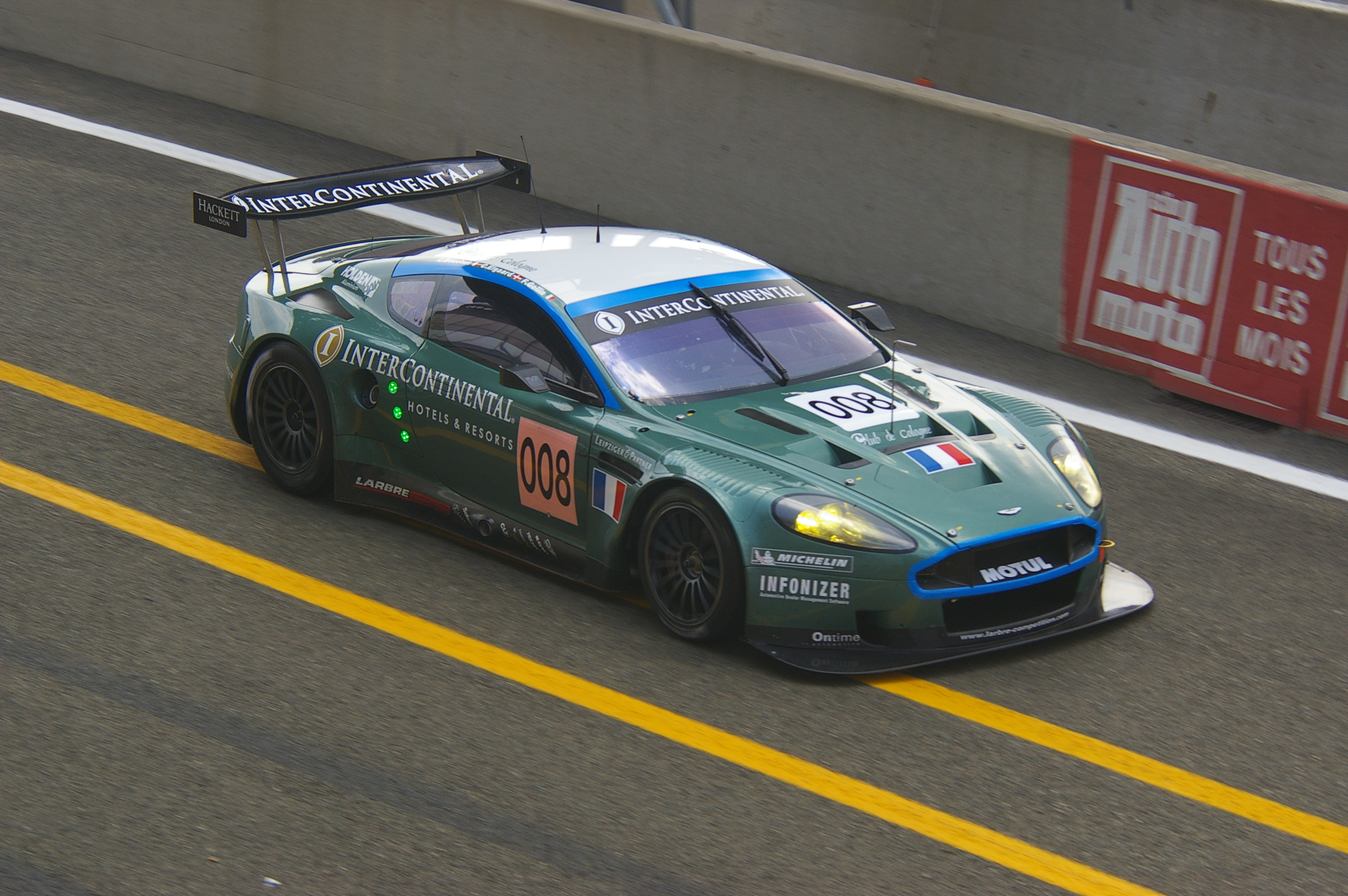
Larbre's Aston Martin DBR9 at the 2007 24 Hours of Le Mans.

=== 24 Hours of Le Mans ===
Year	Entrant	No.	Car	Drivers	Class	Laps	Pos.	Class Pos.
1993	(France) Monaco Média International (France) Société Larbre Compétition	47	Porsche 911 Carrera RSR	(Germany) Jürgen Barth (France) Dominique Dupuy (France) Joël Gouhier	Category 4	304	15th	1st
1993	(France) Société Larbre Compétition	78	Porsche 911 Carrera RSR	(France) Jack Leconte (Spain) Jesús Pareja (France) Pierre de Thoisy	Category 4	301	16th	2nd
1994	(France) Porsche Alméras (France) Société Larbre Compétition	49	Porsche 911 Carrera RSR	(France) Jacques Alméras (France) Jean-Marie Alméras (France) Jacques Laffite	LMGT2	94	DNF	DNF
1994	(France) Société Larbre Compétition	50	Porsche 911 Carrera RSR	(France) Jean-Luc Chéreau (France) Jack Leconte (France) Pierre Yver	LMGT2	62	DNF	DNF
1994	(France) Société Larbre Compétition	52	Porsche 911 Carrera RSR	(France) Dominique Dupuy (Spain) Carlos Palau (Spain) Jesús Pareja	LMGT2	307	8th	1st
1995	(France) Société Larbre Compétition	36	Porsche 911 GT2 Evo	(France) Érik Comas (France) Jean-Pierre Jarier (Spain) Jesús Pareja	LMGT1	64	DNF	DNF
1995	(France) Société Larbre Compétition	37	Porsche 911 GT2 Evo	(France) Emmanuel Collard (France) Dominique Dupuy (Monaco) Stéphane Ortelli	LMGT1	82	DNF	DNF
1995	(France) Société Larbre Compétition (France) Jean-Claude Miloé (private entrant)	55	Porsche 911 GT2 Evo	(France) Jean-Luc Chéreau (France) Jack Leconte (France) Pierre Yver	LMGT1	40	DNF	DNF
1996	(France) Société Chéreau Sports (France) Société Larbre Compétition	27	Porsche 911 GT2 Evo	(France) Jean-Luc Chéreau (France) Jack Leconte (France) Pierre Yver	LMGT1	279	22nd	13th
1996	(France) Société Larbre Compétition	82	Porsche 911 GT2	(Germany) André Ahrlé (France) Patrick Bourdais (France) Patrice Goueslard	LMGT2	284	20th	6th
1997	(France) Société Larbre Compétition	75	Porsche 911 GT2	(France) Patrick Bourdais (United States) Peter Kitchak (Brazil) André Lara-Rezende	LMGT2	205	DNF	DNF
1997	(France) Société Chéreau Sports (France) Société Larbre Compétition	77	Porsche 911 GT2	(France) Jean-Luc Chéreau (France) Jean-Pierre Jarier (France) Jack Leconte	LMGT2	77	DNF	DNF
1998	(France) Chéreau Sports (France) Société Larbre Compétition	60	Porsche 911 GT2	(United Kingdom) Robin Donovan (France) Jean-Pierre Jarier (Sweden) Carl Rosenblad	LMGT2	164	DNF	DNF
1998	(France) Société Larbre Compétition	72	Porsche 911 GT2	(France) Jean-Luc Chéreau (France) Patrice Goueslard (France) Pierre Yver	LMGT2	240	23rd	9th
1999	(France) Chéreau Sports (France) Larbre Compétition	65	Porsche 993 GT2	(France) Jean-Luc Chéreau (France) Patrice Goueslard (France) Pierre Yver	LMGTS	240	NC	NC
1999	(France) Larbre Compétition	67	Porsche 993 GT2	(France) Sébastien Bourdais (France) Jean-Pierre Jarier (France) Pierre de Thoisy	LMGTS	134	DNF	DNF
2000	(France) Larbre Compétition	77	Porsche 911 GT3 R	(France) Christophe Bouchut (France) Jean-Luc Chéreau (France) Patrice Goueslard	LMGT	34	DNF	DNF
2001	(France) Larbre Compétition	58	Chrysler Viper GTS-R	(France) Jean-Philippe Belloc (France) Christophe Bouchut (Portugal) Tiago Monteiro	LMGTS	234	20th	4th
2001	(France) Larbre Compétition	80	Porsche 911 GT3 RS	(France) Jean-Luc Chéreau (France) Sébastien Dumez (France) Patrice Goueslard	LMGT	274	10th	4th
2002	(France) Larbre Compétition-Chéreau	50	Chrysler Viper GTS-R	(France) Christophe Bouchut (France) Patrice Goueslard (Belgium) Vincent Vosse	LMGTS	319	18th	4th
2002	(France) Larbre Compétition-Chéreau	51	Chrysler Viper GTS-R	(France) Jean-Luc Chéreau (France) Jean-Claude Lagniez (Sweden) Carl Rosenblad	LMGTS	278	25th	6th
2003	(France) Larbre Compétition	86	Chrysler Viper GTS-R	(France) Christophe Bouchut (France) Patrice Goueslard (Switzerland) Steve Zacchia	GTS	317	16th	4th
2004	(United States) Panoz Motor Sports (France) Larbre Compétition	11	Panoz GTP	(France) Roland Bervillé (France) Jean-Luc Blanchemain (France) Patrick Bourdais	LMP1	54	DNF	DNF
2004	(France) Larbre Compétition	69	Ferrari 550 GTS Maranello	(France) Christophe Bouchut (France) Olivier Dupard (France) Patrice Goueslard	GTS	317	14th	5th
2005	(France) Larbre Compétition	50	Ferrari 550 GTS Maranello	(France) Olivier Dupard (France) Patrice Goueslard (Belgium) Vincent Vosse	GT1	324	12th	4th
2006	(France) Larbre Compétition	50	Ferrari 550 GTS Maranello	(France) Jean-Luc Blanchemain (France) Patrick Bornhauser (Switzerland) Gabriele Gardel	GT1	222	DNF	DNF
2007	(France) Aston Martin Racing Larbre	006	Aston Martin DBR9	(France) Roland Bervillé (France) Patrick Bornhauser (United Kingdom) Gregor Fisken	GT1	272	29th	13th
2007	(France) Aston Martin Racing Larbre	008	Aston Martin DBR9	(France) Christophe Bouchut (Denmark) Casper Elgaard (Italy) Fabrizio Gollin	GT1	341	7th	3rd
2008	(France) Larbre Compétition	50	Saleen S7-R	(France) Patrick Bornhauser (France) Christophe Bouchut (France) David Smet	GT1	306	28th	7th
2010	(France) Larbre Compétition	50	Saleen S7-R	(France) Roland Bervillé (France) Julien Canal (Switzerland) Gabriele Gardel	LMGT1	331	13th	1st
2011	(France) Larbre Compétition	50	Chevrolet Corvette C6.R	(France) Patrick Bornhauser (France) Julien Canal (Switzerland) Gabriele Gardel	LMGTE Am	302	20th	1st
2011	(France) Larbre Compétition	70	Porsche 997 GT3 RSR	(France) Jean-Philippe Belloc (France) Christophe Bourret (France) Pascal Gibon	LMGTE Am	301	21st	2nd
2012	(France) Larbre Compétition	50	Chevrolet Corvette C6.R	(France) Patrick Bornhauser (France) Julien Canal (Portugal) Pedro Lamy	LMGTE Am	329	20th	1st
2012	(France) Larbre Compétition	70	Chevrolet Corvette C6.R	(France) Jean-Philippe Belloc (France) Christophe Bourret (France) Pascal Gibon	LMGTE Am	309	28th	5th
2013	(France) Larbre Compétition	50	Chevrolet Corvette C6.R	(France) Patrick Bornhauser (France) Julien Canal (United States) Ricky Taylor	LMGTE Am	302	29th	5th
2013	(France) Larbre Compétition	70	Chevrolet Corvette C6.R	(France) Philippe Dumas (United States) Cooper MacNeil (France) Manuel Rodrigues	LMGTE Am	268	41st	11th
2014	(France) Larbre Compétition	50	Morgan LMP2	(Japan) Keiko Ihara (France) Pierre Ragues (United States) Ricky Taylor	LMP2	341	14th	9th
2015	(France) Larbre Compétition	50	Chevrolet Corvette C7.R	(Denmark) Kristian Poulsen (Italy) Gianluca Roda (Italy) Paolo Ruberti	LMGTE Am	94	DNF	DNF
2016	(France) Larbre Compétition	50	Chevrolet Corvette C7.R	(France) Jean-Philippe Belloc (France) Pierre Ragues (Japan) Yutaka Yamagishi	LMGTE Am	316	37th	8th
2017	(France) Larbre Compétition	50	Chevrolet Corvette C7.R	(France) Romain Brandela (France) Christian Philippon (Brazil) Fernando Rees	LMGTE Am	309	48th	15th
2018	(France) Larbre Compétition	50	Ligier JS P217	(France) Erwin Creed (France) Thomas Dagoneau (France) Romano Ricci	LMP2	332	32nd	12th
2019	(France) Larbre Compétition	50	Ligier JS P217	(United States) Nick Boulle (France) Erwin Creed (France) Romano Ricci	LMP2	355	17th	12th

== Achievements ==
- 24 Hours of Le Mans

1993 - LMGT class winner Porsche 911 Carrera RSR
1994 - LMGTS class winner Porsche 911 Carrera RSR
2010 - LMGT1 class winner Saleen S7-R
2011 - LMGTE-AM class winner Chevrolet Corvette C6.R GT2
2012 - LMGTE-AM class winner Chevrolet Corvette C6.R GT2

- FIA GT Championship

2000 - N-GT class team champion Porsche 911 GT3-R
2001 - GT class team champion Chrysler Viper GTS-R
2002 - GT class team champion Chrysler Viper GTS-R

- Spa 24 Hours

2001 - Overall winner Chrysler Viper GTS-R
2002 - Overall winner Chrysler Viper GTS-R

- Le Mans Series

2004 - LMGTS class team champion Ferrari 550-GTS Maranello
2006 - LMGT1 class team champion Aston Martin DBR9
2010 - LMGT1 class team champion Saleen S7-R

- Intercontinental Le Mans Cup

2010 - LMGT1 class team champion Saleen S7-R
2011 - LMGTE-AM class champion Chevrolet Corvette C6.R GT2

- Championat de France FFSA GT

1997 Champion de France FFSA GT Porsche GT2
2003 Champion de France FFSA GT Chrysler Viper
2008 Champion de France FFSA GT Saleen S7-R
2010 Champion de France FFSA GT Porsche 911 GT3
