= Patrick Bornhauser =

French racing driver and businessman

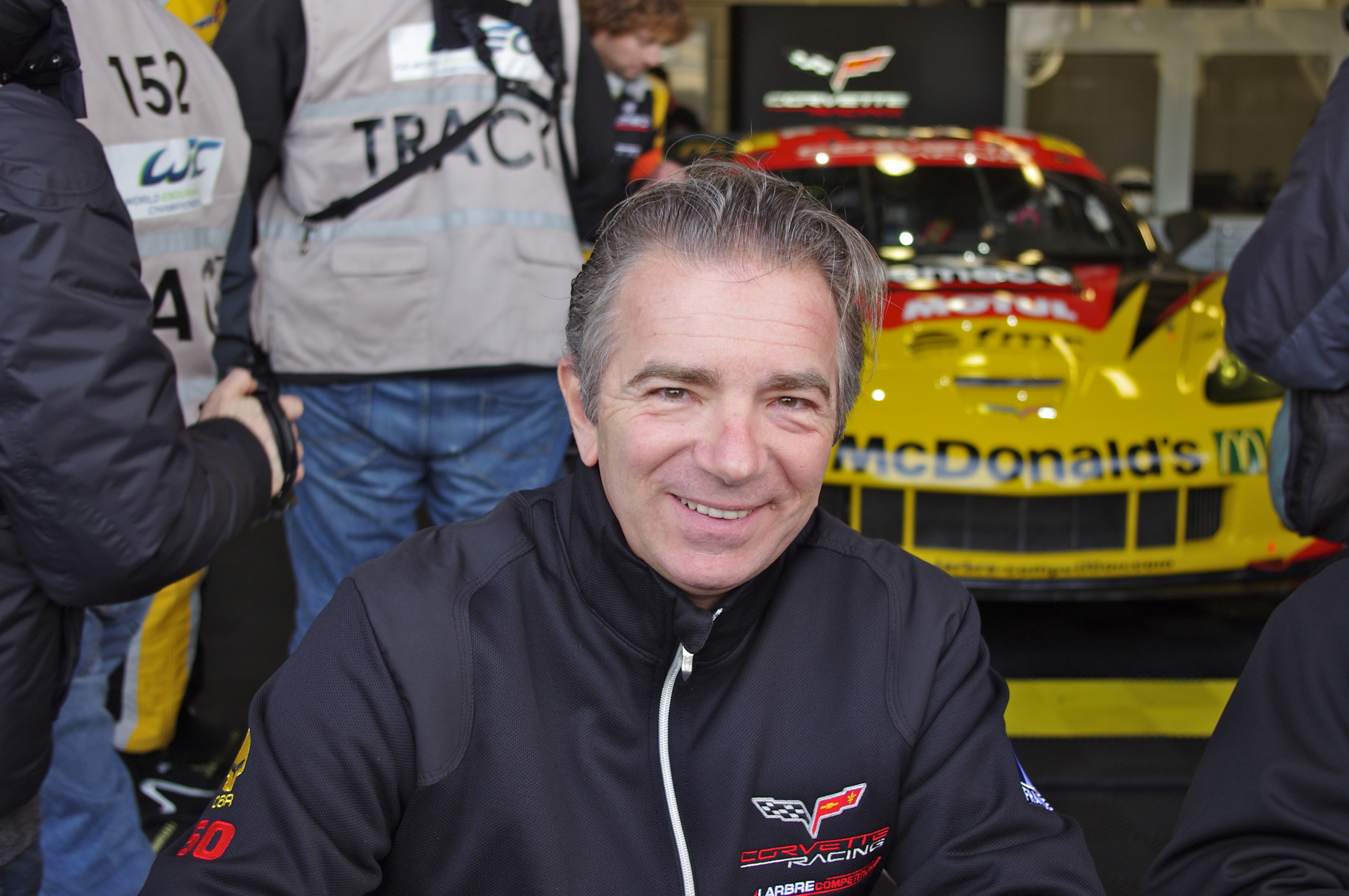
- Patrick Bornhauser, 2013
- Nationality: (France) French
- Born: Patrick Georges Bornhauser; 29 June 1957 (age 69) Orléans, France

FIA World Endurance Championship career
- Debut season: 2012
- Current team: Larbre Compétition
- Categorisation: FIA Silver (until 2013); FIA Bronze (2014–)
- Car number: 50

Previous series
- 2011 2011 2008, 11 2006 2006 1997–99, 2003– 1995–96 1994: Intercontinental Le Mans Cup; American Le Mans Series; Le Mans Series; FIA GT Championship; FIA GT3 European Championship; FFSA GT Championship; Global GT Championship; Peugeot 905 Spider Cup

Championship titles
- 2004–05, 08, 10: FFSA GT Championship
24 Hours of Le Mans career
- Years: 2006–2008, 2011–2013
- Teams: Larbre Competition
- Best finish: 20th (2011, 2012)
- Class wins: 2 (2011, 2012)

Patrick Georges Bornhauser (born 29 June 1957 in Orléans) is a French racing driver and businessman. In 2011 and 2012 he won the GTE-Am class at the 24 Hours of Le Mans.

== Racing career ==
Bornhauser started competing in hillclimbing and then rallying. In 1994, he started circuit racing in the Peugeot 905 Spider Cup, finishing fifth.

From 1995, Bornhauser raced the VBM 400 GTC (VBM stood for Vehicles Bornhauser-Metz, started by Bornhauser and fellow driver Jean-François Metz), in BPR Global GT Series races in 1995–96 and then in French GT until 2001.

Bornhauser switched to a Porsche for 2002, and then to a Chrysler Viper GTS-R in 2004 with which he won his first French GT titles in 2004 and 2005. In 2006, he made his 24 Hours of Le Mans debut in a Larbre Competition Ferrari 550 Maranello. The following year, he raced an Aston Martin DBR9 for Larbre.

In 2008, Bornhauser won the French GT title for a third time after sharing a Larbre-run Saleen S7 with Christophe Bouchut, which they also raced at Le Mans. Bornhauser regained the French GT title in 2010 in a Larbre-run Porsche together with Laurent Groppi.

After two years away, Bornhauser returned to Le Mans in 2011 and won the GTE-Am class in a Chevrolet Corvette C6.R entered by Larbre. He repeated the feat with the same team and car in 2012.

== Business ==
Bornhauser is the Group CEO of French moving company Demeco.

== 24 Hours of Le Mans results ==
Year	Team	Co-Drivers	Car	Class	Laps	Pos.	Class Pos.
2006	(France) Larbre Compétition	(France) Jean-Luc Blanchemain (Switzerland) Gabriele Gardel	Ferrari 550-GTS Maranello	GT1	222	DNF	DNF
2007	(France) Aston Martin Racing Larbre	(France) Roland Bervillé (United Kingdom) Gregor Fisken	Aston Martin DBR9	GT1	272	29th	13th
2008	(France) Larbre Compétition	(France) David Smet (France) Christophe Bouchut	Saleen S7-R	GT1	306	28th	7th
2011	(France) Larbre Compétition	(France) Julien Canal (Switzerland) Gabriele Gardel	Chevrolet Corvette C6.R	GTE; Am	302	20th	1st
2012	(France) Larbre Compétition	(France) Julien Canal (Portugal) Pedro Lamy	Chevrolet Corvette C6.R	GTE; Am	329	20th	1st
2013	(France) Larbre Compétition	(France) Julien Canal (United States) Ricky Taylor	Chevrolet Corvette C6.R	GTE; Am	302	29th	5th
