= Christophe Bouchut =

French racing driver (born 1966)

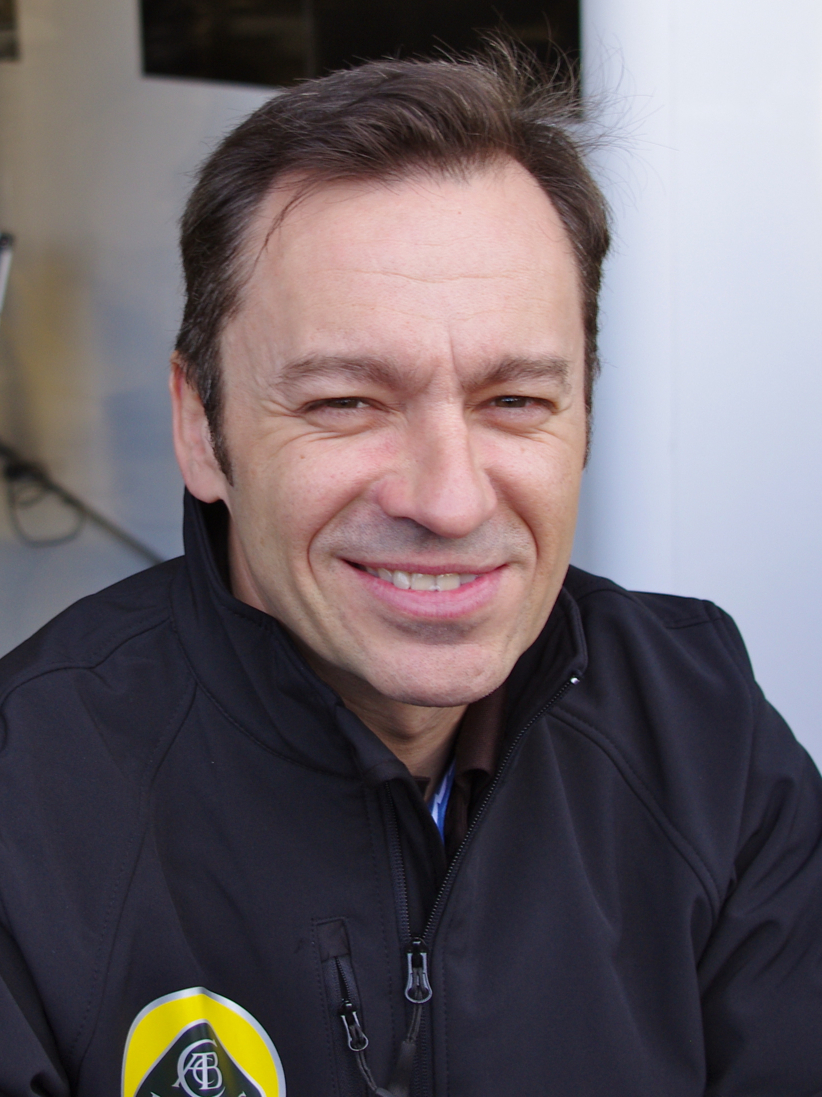
- Bouchut in 2013
- Nationality: (France) French
- Born: Christophe Joseph Marie Bouchut; 24 September 1966 (age 60) Voiron, Isère, France
- Categorisation: FIA Platinum (until 2016); FIA Gold (2017–2021); FIA Silver (2022–)

24 Hours of Le Mans career
- Years: 1993 – 2005, 2007 – 2013
- Best finish: 1st (1993)
- Class wins: 1 (1993)

Christophe Joseph Marie Bouchut (born 24 September 1966 in Voiron, Isère) is a French professional racing driver. He currently competes in the NASCAR Whelen Euro Series, driving for Dexwet-df1 Racing and Alex Caffi Motorsport in a part-time effort. He won the 24 Hours of Le Mans in 1993. He was named as the first driver for the F1 Larrousse team for the 1995 season, but the team withdrew before the first race.

In his 30 years of racing, Bouchut has earned 105 victories, 85 pole positions, four overall wins in 24-hour races (1993 Le Mans, 1995 Daytona, 2001 and 2002 Spa), three FIA GT titles (2000–2002) and the 2011 American Le Mans Series LMP2 championship.

== Racing record ==
=== 24 Hours of Le Mans results ===
Year	Team	Co-Drivers	Car	Class	Laps	Pos.	Class Pos.
1993	(France) Peugeot Talbot Sport	(France) Éric Hélary (Australia) Geoff Brabham	Peugeot 905 Evo 1B	C1	375	**1st**	**1st**
1994	(Germany) Kremer Honda Racing	(Germany) Armin Hahne (Belgium) Bertrand Gachot	Honda NSX	GT2	257	14th	6th
1995	(Germany) Porsche Kremer Racing	(Belgium) Thierry Boutsen (Germany) Hans-Joachim Stuck	Kremer K8 Spyder	WSC	289	6th	**2nd**
1996	(Germany) Kremer Racing	(Germany) Jürgen Lässig (Finland) Harri Toivonen	Kremer K8 Spyder	LMP1	110	DNF	DNF
1997	(Germany) Kremer Racing	(United States) Andy Evans (Belgium) Bertrand Gachot	Porsche 911 GT1	GT1	207	DNF	DNF
1998	(Germany) AMG-Mercedes	(France) Jean-Marc Gounon (Brazil) Ricardo Zonta	Mercedes-Benz CLK LM	GT1	31	DNF	DNF
1999	(Germany) AMG-Mercedes	(Germany) Nick Heidfeld (United Kingdom) Peter Dumbreck	Mercedes-Benz CLR	LMGTP	75	DNF	DNF
2000	(France) Larbre Compétition	(France) Patrice Goueslard (France) Jean-Luc Chéreau	Porsche 911 GT3-R	GT	34	DNF	DNF
2001	(France) Larbre Compétition	(France) Jean-Philippe Belloc (Portugal) Tiago Monteiro	Chrysler Viper GTS-R	GTS	234	20th	4th
2002	(France) Larbre Compétition	(France) Patrice Goueslard (Belgium) Vincent Vosse	Chrysler Viper GTS-R	GTS	319	18th	4th
2003	(France) Larbre Compétition	(France) Patrice Goueslard (Switzerland) Steve Zacchia	Chrysler Viper GTS-R	GTS	317	16th	4th
2004	(France) Larbre Compétition	(France) Patrice Goueslard (France) Olivier Dupard	Ferrari 550-GTS Maranello	GTS	317	14th	5th
2005	(United Kingdom) Cirtek Motorsport (Russia) Russian Age Racing (Russia) Convers Team	(Russia) Nikolai Fomenko (Russia) Alexey Vasilyev	Ferrari 550-GTS Maranello	GT1	315	17th	5th
2007	(France) Aston Martin Racing Larbre	(Italy) Fabrizio Gollin (Denmark) Casper Elgaard	Aston Martin DBR9	GT1	305	7th	**3rd**
2008	(France) Larbre Compétition	(France) David Smet (France) Patrick Bornhauser	Saleen S7-R	GT1	306	28th	7th
2009	(Monaco) JMB Racing	(France) Manuel Rodrigues (France) Yvan Lebon	Ferrari F430 GT2	GT2	304	29th	8th
2010	(Germany) Kolles (United States) Level 5 Motorsports	(United States) Scott Tucker (France) Manuel Rodrigues	Audi R10 TDI	LMP1	182	DNF	DNF
2011	(United States) Level 5 Motorsports	(United States) Scott Tucker (Portugal) João Barbosa	Lola B08/80-HPD	LMP2	319	10th	**3rd**
2012	(United States) Level 5 Motorsports	(United States) Scott Tucker (Mexico) Luis Díaz	HPD ARX-03b	LMP2	240	DNF	DNF
2013	(Czech Republic) Lotus	(United States) Kevin Weeda (United Kingdom) James Rossiter	Lotus T128	LMP2	17	DNF	DNF

=== Complete International Formula 3000 results ===
(key) (Races in bold indicate pole position; races in italics indicate fastest lap.)

Year	Entrant	Chassis	Engine	1	2	3	4	5	6	7	8	Pos.	Pts
1995	Danielson	Reynard 95D	Cosworth	SIL; DSQ	CAT; DSQ							10th	6
1995	Danielson	Lola T95/50	Cosworth			PAU; 8	PER; Ret	HOC; Ret	SPA; 2	EST; 14†	MAG; Ret	10th	6

=== Complete FIA GT Championship results ===
(key) (Races in bold indicate pole position) (Races in italics indicate fastest lap)

Year	Team	Car	Class	1	2	3	4	5	6	7	8	9	10	11	Pos.	Pts
1997	Kremer Racing	Porsche 911 GT1	GT1	HOC; 8	SIL	HEL	NÜR; 9	SPA; Ret	A1R		DON; Ret	MUG; 12	SEB	LAG	NC	0
1997	Roock Racing	Porsche 911 GT1	GT1							SUZ; 13					NC	0
1997	Kremer Racing	Porsche 911 GT2	GT2	HOC	SIL	HEL	NÜR	SPA	A1R; 6	SUZ	DON	MUG	SEB	LAG	68th	1
1998	Team Persson Motorsport	Mercedes-Benz CLK GTR	GT1	OSC; Ret	SIL; 7	HOC; 10	DIJ; 4	HUN; DNS	SUZ; 4	DON; 8	A1R; 10	HOM; Ret	LAG; 6		15th	7
2000	Larbre Compétition Chéreau	Porsche 911 GT3-R	N-GT	VAL; 1	EST; 1	MNZ; 3	SIL; 1	HUN; 1	ZOL; 2	A1R; 6	LAU; 2	BRN; 1	MAG; 1		1st	72
2001	Larbre Compétition Chéreau	Chrysler Viper GTS-R	GT	**MNZ**; 2	BRN; 1	**MAG**; 2	SIL; 1	ZOL; 1	HUN; 2	SPA; 1	A1R; 5	NÜR; 7	**JAR**; 4	EST; 3	1st	77
2002	Larbre Compétition Chéreau	Chrysler Viper GTS-R	GT	MAG; 3	SIL; 3	BRN; 2	JAR; 3	AND; 2	OSC; Ret	SPA; 1	PER; 5	DON; Ret	EST; 4		1st	49
2003	Larbre Compétition	Chrysler Viper GTS-R	GT	CAT; Ret	MAG; Ret	PER	BRN	DON	SPA; 4	AND	OSC	EST	MNZ		16th	17
2004	Zwaans GTR Racing Team	Chrysler Viper GTS-R	GT	MNZ; 6	VAL; 9	MAG; 8	HOC; 7	BRN	DON	SPA	IMO; 15	OSC	DUB		27th	11
2004	Care Racing Developments	Ferrari 550-GTS Maranello	GT											ZHU; 4	27th	11
2005	Russian Age Racing	Ferrari 550-GTS Maranello	GT1	MNZ; Ret	**MAG**; 8	SIL; 10	IMO; Ret	BRN; 8		OSC; 11	IST; 8				13th	24
2005	Larbre Compétition	Ferrari 550-GTS Maranello	GT1						SPA; 3						13th	24
2005	Russian Age Racing	Aston Martin DBR9	GT1									**ZHU**; Ret	**DUB**; 11	**BHR**; 1	13th	24
2006	Cirtek Motorsport	Aston Martin DBR9	GT1	SIL; 4											24th	13.5
2006	B-Racing RS Line Team	Lamborghini Murciélago R-GT	GT1		BRN; 6	OSC; 9									24th	13.5
2006	Race Alliance	Aston Martin DBR9	GT1				SPA; 8	PRI							24th	13.5
2006	All-Inkl.com Racing	Lamborghini Murciélago R-GT	GT1						DIJ; 8	MUG; Ret	HUN; 8	ADR; Ret	DUB		24th	13.5
2007	All-Inkl.com Racing	Lamborghini Murciélago R-GT	GT1	ZHU; 1	SIL	BUC; 2	MNZ; Ret	OSC; DSQ	SPA; Ret	ADR; 9	BRN; 6	NOG; 11	ZOL; 10		18th	21
2008	Selleslagh Racing Team	Chevrolet Corvette C6.R	GT1	SIL; 4	MNZ; 1	ADR; 4	OSC; 7	SPA; Ret	BUC; 5	BUC; 6	BRN; 3	NOG; 8	ZOL; Ret	SAN	13th	32.5

=== Complete Porsche Supercup results ===
(key) (Races in bold indicate pole position) (Races in italics indicate fastest lap)

Year	Team	Car	1	2	3	4	5	6	7	8	9	10	11	12	Pos.	Pts	Ref
2002	Larbre Compétition Chéreau	Porsche 996 GT3	ITA; 2	ESP; Ret	AUT; Ret	MON; 7	GER; 9	GBR; 2	GER; 6	HUN; 10	BEL; 9	ITA; 3	USA; 7	USA; 6	5th	119	

=== Complete GT1 World Championship results ===
(key) (Races in bold indicate pole position) (Races in italics indicate fastest lap)

Year	Team	Car	1	2	3	4	5	6	7	8	9	10	11	12	13	14	15	16	17	18	19	20	Pos.	Pts	Ref
2010	All-Inkl.com Münnich Motorsport	Lamborghini	ABU; QR	ABU; CR	SIL; QR; 17	SIL; CR; Ret	BRN; QR	BRN; CR	PRI; QR; 16	PRI; CR; 17	SPA; QR; 15	SPA; CR; Ret	NÜR; QR	NÜR; CR	ALG; QR; Ret	ALG; CR; 17	NAV; QR; 8	NAV; CR; Ret	INT; QR; EX	INT; CR; EX	SAN; QR	SAN; CR	50th	0	

=== Complete FIA World Endurance Championship results ===
Year	Entrant	Class	Chassis	Engine	1	2	3	4	5	6	7	8	Pos.	Pts
2013	Lotus	LMP2	Lotus T128	Praga (Judd) HK 3.6 L V8	SIL; Ret	SPA	LMS; Ret	SÃO; Ret	COA	FUJ	SHA; Ret	BHR	NC	0
2014	Lotus	LMP1	CLM P1/01	AER P60 2.0 L Turbo V6	SIL	SPA	LMS	COA; 15	FUJ; Ret	SHA	BHR	SÃO	25th	0.5

=== Complete Blancpain Sprint Series results ===
Year	Team	Car	Class	1	2	3	4	5	6	7	8	9	10	11	12	13	14	Pos.	Pts	Ref
2015	GT Russian Team	Mercedes-Benz SLS AMG GT3	Pro-Am	NOG; QR; 14	NOG; CR; 9	BRH; QR	BRH; CR	ZOL; QR	ZOL; CR	MOS; QR; 13	MOS; CR; 12	ALG; QR; 12	ALG; CR; 10	MIS; QR; 14	MIS; CR; 15	ZAN; QR	ZAN; CR	25th	3	

=== NASCAR ===
(key) (Bold – Pole position awarded by qualifying time. Italics – Pole position earned by points standings or practice time. * – Most laps led.)

==== Whelen Euro Series - Elite 1 ====
NASCAR Whelen Euro Series - Elite 1 results
Year	Team	No.	Make	1	2	3	4	5	6	7	8	9	10	11	12	13	NWES	Pts	Ref
2014	DF1 Racing	77	Chevy	VAL; 10	VAL; 7	BRH; 6	BRH; 3	TOU; 22	TOU; 21	NÜR; 10	NÜR; 10	UMB	UMB	BUG	BUG		20th	264	
2015	DF1 Racing	66	Chevy	VAL; 19	VAL; DNS	VEN	VEN	BRH; DNS	BRH; DNS	TOU	TOU	UMB	UMB	ZOL	ZOL		32nd	64	
2017	DF1 Racing	66	Chevy	VAL; 3	VAL; 5	BRH; 8	BRH; 23	VEN	VEN; 17	HOC; 21	HOC; 5	FRA; 16	FRA; 11	ZOL	ZOL		17th	357	
2018	Dexwet-df1 Racing	66	Chevy	VAL; 29	VAL; 26	FRA; 9	FRA; 7	BRH; 6	BRH; 5	TOU	TOU	HOC	HOC	ZOL; 7	ZOL; 7		21st	260	
2019	Dexwet-df1 Racing	66	Chevy	VAL; 9	VAL; DNS	FRA; 11	FRA; DNS										33rd*	56*	
2019	Alex Caffi Motorsport	1	Ford					BRH	BRH	MOS; DNS	MOS; 23	VEN	HOC	HOC	ZOL	ZOL	33rd*	56*	

^{*} Season still in progress.

Sporting positions
Preceded by Éric Hélary	French Formula Three Champion; 1991	Succeeded by Franck Lagorce
Preceded by Derek Warwick; Yannick Dalmas; Mark Blundell	Winner of the 24 Hours of Le Mans; 1993 with: Geoff Brabham; Éric Hélary	Succeeded by Yannick Dalmas; Hurley Haywood; Mauro Baldi
Preceded by Dominique Dupuy	Porsche Carrera Cup France Champion; 1994–1996	Succeeded by Dominique Dupuy
Preceded by Dominique Dupuy	Porsche Carrera Cup France Champion; 2000	Succeeded by Philippe Gache
Preceded by Julian Bailey; Jamie Campbell-Walter	FIA GT Champion; 2001–2002 with: Jean-Philippe Belloc (2001)	Succeeded by Thomas Biagi; Matteo Bobbi
Preceded by Soheil Ayari	French Touring Car Champion; 2003	Succeeded by Soheil Ayari
Preceded by Soheil Ayari; Raymond Narac	FFSA GT Champion; 2008 with: (Patrick Bornhauser)	Succeeded by Eric Débard
