= Julien Canal =

French racing driver

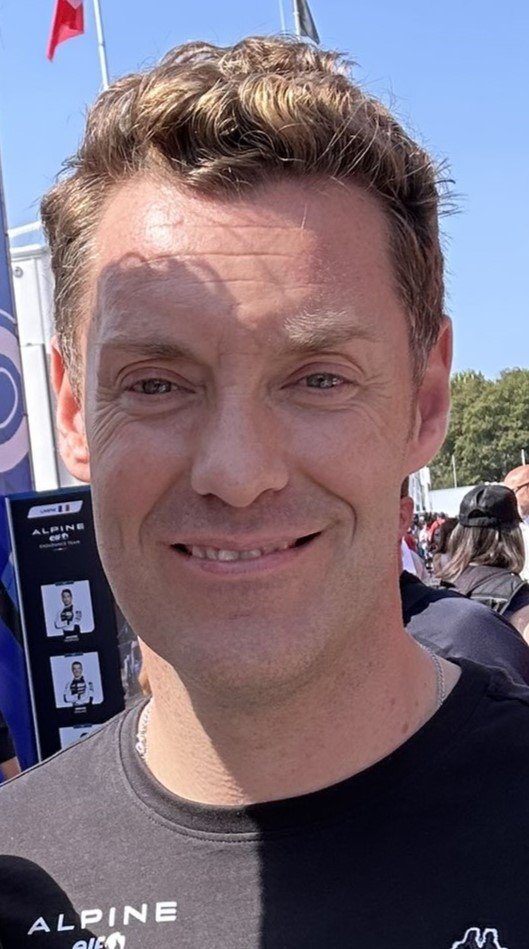
- Canal in 2023
- Nationality: French
- Born: Julien Antoine Jules Canal; 15 July 1982 (age 44) Le Mans, France

FIA World Endurance Championship career
- Debut season: 2012
- Current team: Alpine Elf Team
- Categorisation: FIA Silver
- Car number: 36
- Former teams: G-Drive Racing, Manor, Vaillante Rebellion, Larbre Compétition, Panis Barthez Competition
- Starts: 45 (45 entries)
- Wins: 15
- Podiums: 26
- Poles: 4
- Fastest laps: 0
- Best finish: 1st (LMP2) in 2015, 2017

Previous series
- 2011 2011 2010–11 2009 2008 2008, 10 2007–09 2003–2006 2003–06 2003: Intercontinental Le Mans Cup; American Le Mans Series; Le Mans Series; Formula Le Mans; FIA GT Championship; FFSA GT Championship; Porsche Carrera Cup France; Eurocup Formula Renault; French Formula Renault; Formula Renault 2.0 Germany
24 Hours of Le Mans career
- Years: 2010–
- Teams: Larbre Competition
- Best finish: 13th (2010)
- Class wins: 3 (2010, 2011, 2012)

Julien Antoine Jules Canal (born 15 July 1982 in Le Mans) is a French racing driver. Having won his class at the 24 Hours of Le Mans in 2010, 2011 and 2012 whilst driving GT cars, Canal became a staple of the LMP2 category, winning the WEC class title in 2015 and 2017.

== Early career ==
=== Single-seaters ===
After competing in karting, where he finished third in the French Championship Elite in 2000, Canal stepped up to single-seaters in 2003. He raced in French Formula Renault for four seasons, scoring his first podium in his final season in 2006 and finishing sixth overall. He also raced in the Eurocup Formula Renault 2.0 series in each of those four seasons.

== GT racing ==
Canal switched to GT racing in 2007 when he started racing in the Porsche Carrera Cup France. He finished ninth, tenth and eighth in the three seasons he contested, scoring one podium finish and two pole positions. In 2010, he took part in the FFSA GT Championship.

Canal joined the Larbre Compétition team to race their Saleen S7-R in the opening round of the 2007 Le Mans Series season at Circuit Paul Ricard, where they were the only team entered in the GT1 class. He returned to the team for the 2010 24 Hours of Le Mans, where they won the GT1 class; he later described the victory as unexpected.

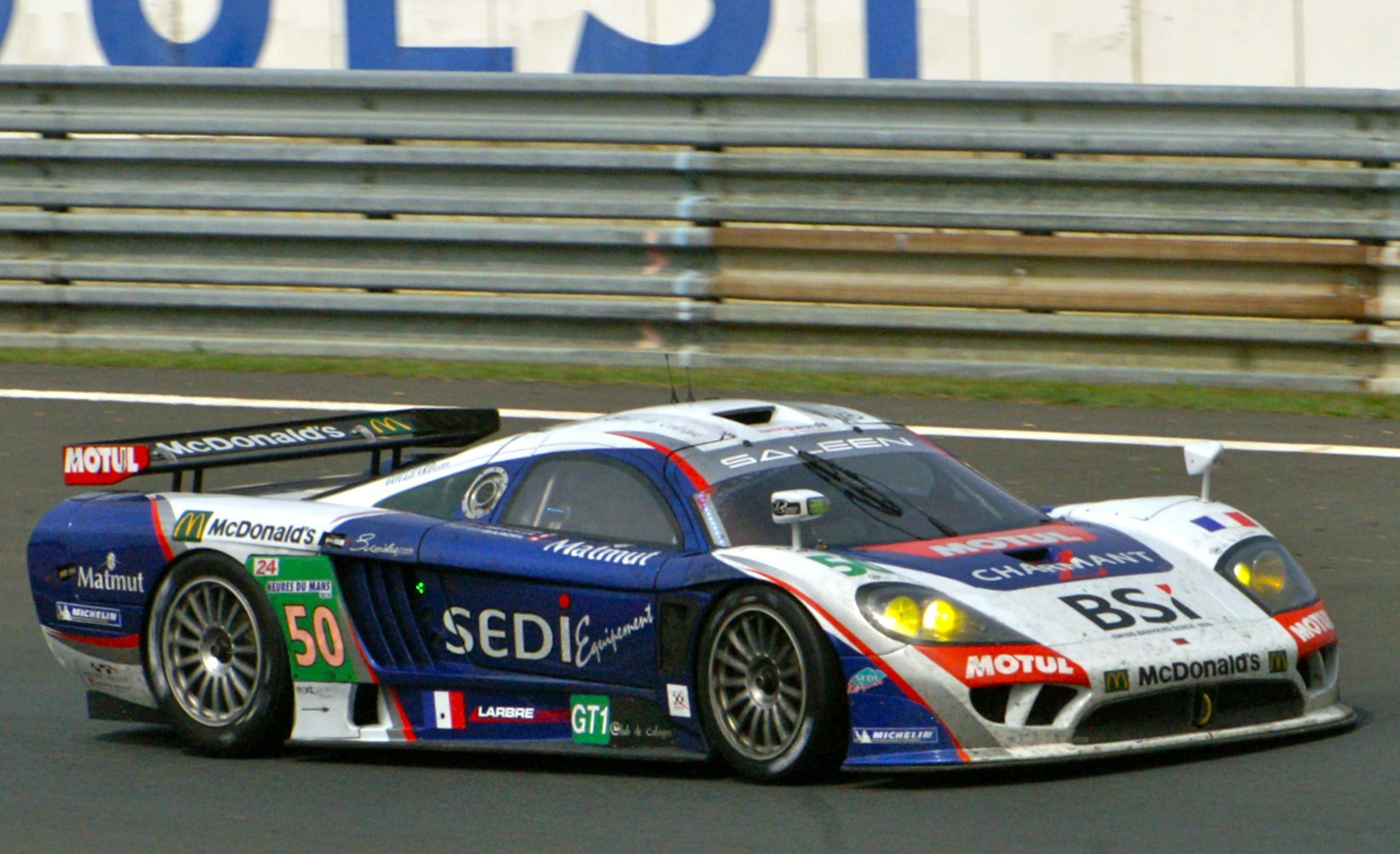
Canal won the 2010 24 Hours of Le Mans with the Saleen S7-R in the GT1 class, with Roland Bervillé and Gabriele Gardel.

Canal remained with the team for the 2011 season, racing in the Intercontinental Le Mans Cup. The team's highlight came at Le Mans once again, as Canal and Gabriele Gardel, as well as new teammate Patrick Bornhauser, repeated their victory, this time triumphing in the LMGTE Am class. Canal and the team returned to the LMGTE Am category in 2012, this time entering the newly-formed FIA World Endurance Championship. The year yielded three wins, which included Canal's third win at Le Mans, with Pedro Lamy making the pass for the class lead during the final hour. In 2013, Canal remained with Larbre for his fourth and final season with the team, getting two podiums and ending up fifth in the LMGTE Am standings of the WEC.

== Prototype career ==
Canal switched to prototype racing for the 2014 season, competing in the LMP2 class with G-Drive Racing. Alongside Olivier Pla and Roman Rusinov, he garnered four victories, although a retirement at Le Mans and a major accident for Pla caused by a brake failure at the season finale in São Paulo eventually consigned them to second in the championship. For 2015, Canal remained with G-Drive, this time being joined by pro driver Sam Bird along with Rusinov. In the burgeoning class, the trio led by Bird dominated, scoring podiums in all but one race and winning the title with four victories.

Canal moved to Greaves Motorsport in 2016, competing in the European Le Mans Series. He and Memo Rojas failed to finish on the podium during the year, ended up sixth at Le Mans, and finished seventh in the ELMS teams' standings. The following season, Canal returned to the WEC, this time partnering Bruno Senna and Nico Prost at Vaillante Rebellion. Their campaign began strongly, as three podiums in the opening four races propelled them into the title battle. After a win in Mexico, however, the floodgates opened, with Rebellion winning the final three races and taking home the LMP2 title — Canal's second in the championship — following a resilient performance by Senna at Bahrain despite a late loss of power steering.

In 2018, Canal returned to the ELMS with Panis Barthez Competition, racing alongside Timothé Buret and Will Stevens. After a number of points finishes, the team concluded the campaign with two podiums to end up sixth overall. Canal came back to drive Panis's Ligier JS P217 in 2019, though he, Stevens, and René Binder struggled to attain top results, leaving them 11th in the standings despite a mid-season switch to the Oreca 07 chassis. For the COVID-affected 2020 season, Canal remained with the rebranded Panis Racing team, this time driving an Oreca 07 for the whole year together with Stevens and Nico Jamin. Despite starting out with a retirement at the opening race, the trio bounced back with a third place at Spa; three further top-five finishes propelled Panis Racing to fourth place overall. Canal's Le Mans 24 Hour venture that year yielded a positive result too, as he scored his first LMP2 podium at the event since 2015 by finishing third alongside Jamin and Matthieu Vaxivière.

Following that clean and successful year, Canal returned for another ELMS campaign with Panis, driving together with Stevens and fifth-year pilot James Allen. A podium at Barcelona started off the year, though it was a victory at Monza, which was the team's first win in the series, that helped Canal and his teammates in the championship. They finished third overall, having scored another podium in Belgium, meanwhile their Le Mans success continued with another third place in class.

In 2022, Canal entered his final ELMS season with Panis, teaming up with Jamin and Job van Uitert. This turned out to be his magnum opus in the championship, as four podiums helped Panis to second place in the standings. After moving back to the WEC in 2023 with Alpine, for whom he scored a podium at Monza and finished seventh in the standings, Canal did not partake in any competitions during 2024.

== Personal life ==
Canal operated a McDonald's restaurant in his hometown Le Mans. As of 2022, Canal has opened three McDonald's restaurants in cities outside Le Mans.

== Racing record ==
=== Racing career summary ===
Season	Series	Team	Races	Wins	Poles	F/Laps	Podiums	Points	Position
2003	French Formula Renault Championship	CD Sport	8	0	0	0	0	0	29th
2003	Formula Renault 2.0 Eurocup	CD Sport	4	0	0	0	0	0	NC†
2003	Formula Renault 2000 Germany	ASM	2	0	0	0	0	0	NC†
2004	Formula Renault 2.0 Eurocup	Graff Racing	17	0	0	0	0	10	24th
2004	France Formula Renault 2.0	Graff Racing	8	0	0	0	0	6	21st
2005	Eurocup Formula Renault 2.0	Graff Racing	16	0	0	0	0	17	16th
2005	France Formula Renault 2.0	Graff Racing	8	0	0	0	0	17	14th
2006	France Formula Renault 2.0	Graff Racing	13	0	1	1	1	61	6th
2006	Eurocup Formula Renault 2.0	Graff Racing	2	0	0	0	0	0	NC†
2007	Porsche Carrera Cup France	Graff Racing	14	0	0	0	0	43	9th
2008	Porsche Carrera Cup France	Graff Racing	14	0	1	0	0	45	10th
2008	French GT Championship	DKR Engineering	4	1	3	0	2	68	13th
2008	FIA GT Championship - GT1	DKR Engineering	1	0	0	0	0	0	NC†
2009	Porsche Carrera Cup France	Graff Racing	14	0	1	1	1	82	8th
2009	Formula Le Mans Cup	Graff Racing	1	0	0	0	0	8	34th
2010	French GT Championship	Graff Racing	11	2	0	1	2	48	7th
2010	Le Mans Series - GT1	Larbre Compétition	1	1	0	1	1	33	**3rd**
2010	24 Hours of Le Mans - GT1	Larbre Compétition	1	1	0	0	1	N/A	**1st**
2011	Intercontinental Le Mans Cup - LMGTE Am	Larbre Compétition	7	1	0	0	5	0	NC†
2011	Le Mans Series - LMGTE Am	Larbre Compétition	3	0	0	0	2	0	NC†
2011	24 Hours of Le Mans - LMGTE Am	Larbre Compétition	1	1	0	0	1	N/A	**1st**
2011	American Le Mans Series - GT	Larbre Compétition	1	0	0	0	0	0	NC†
2012	FIA World Endurance Championship - LMGTE Am	Larbre Compétition	8	3	0	0	4	0	NC†
2012	24 Hours of Le Mans - LMGTE Am	Larbre Compétition	1	1	0	0	1	N/A	**1st**
2013	FIA World Endurance Championship - LMGTE Am	Larbre Compétition	8	0	0	0	2	97	5th
2013	24 Hours of Le Mans - LMGTE Am	Larbre Compétition	1	0	0	0	0	N/A	5th
2014	FIA World Endurance Championship - LMP2	G-Drive Racing	8	4	1	0	4	137	**2nd**
2014	24 Hours of Le Mans - LMP2	G-Drive Racing	1	0	0	0	0	N/A	DNF
2014	Blancpain Endurance Series - Pro-Am	Sofrev ASP	1	0	0	0	0	4	25th
2015	FIA World Endurance Championship - LMP2	G-Drive Racing	8	4	4	0	7	178	**1st**
2015	24 Hours of Le Mans - LMP2	G-Drive Racing	1	0	0	0	0	N/A	**3rd**
2015	European Le Mans Series - LMP2	Krohn Racing	1	0	0	0	0	10	18th
2016	European Le Mans Series - LMP2	Greaves Motorsport	6	0	0	0	0	36	10th
2016	24 Hours of Le Mans - LMP2	Greaves Motorsport	1	0	0	0	0	N/A	6th
2016	FIA World Endurance Championship - LMP2	Manor	1	0	0	0	0	6	46th
2017	FIA World Endurance Championship - LMP2	Vaillante Rebellion	9	4	0	0	8	186	**1st**
2017	24 Hours of Le Mans - LMP2	Vaillante Rebellion	1	0	0	0	0	N/A	14th
2017	IMSA Sportscar Championship - Prototype	PR1/Mathiasen Motorsports	1	0	0	0	0	21	41st
2018	European Le Mans Series - LMP2	Panis Barthez Competition	6	0	0	0	2	45.5	9th
2018	24 Hours of Le Mans - LMP2	Panis Barthez Competition	1	0	0	0	0	N/A	9th
2018–19	FIA World Endurance Championship - LMP2	Larbre Compétition	1	0	0	0	0	8	19th
2019	European Le Mans Series - LMP2	Panis Barthez Competition	6	0	0	0	0	19.5	18th
2019	24 Hours of Le Mans - LMP2	Panis Barthez Competition	1	0	0	0	0	N/A	8th
2020	European Le Mans Series - LMP2	Panis Racing	5	0	0	0	1	47	4th
2020	24 Hours of Le Mans - LMP2	Panis Racing	1	0	0	0	1	N/A	**3rd**
2021	European Le Mans Series - LMP2	Panis Racing	6	1	0	0	3	74.5	**3rd**
2021	24 Hours of Le Mans - LMP2	Panis Racing	1	0	0	0	1	N/A	**3rd**
2022	European Le Mans Series - LMP2	Panis Racing	6	0	0	0	4	94	**2nd**
2022	24 Hours of Le Mans - LMP2	Panis Racing	1	0	0	0	0	N/A	12th
2023	FIA World Endurance Championship - LMP2	Alpine Elf Team	7	0	0	0	1	83	7th
2023	24 Hours of Le Mans - LMP2	Alpine Elf Team	1	0	0	0	0	N/A	4th
2023	IMSA SportsCar Championship - LMP2	AF Corse	1	0	0	0	1	0	NC

† As Canal was a guest driver, he was ineligible to score points.

=== Complete Eurocup Formula Renault 2.0 results ===
(key) (Races in bold indicate pole position) (Races in italics indicate fastest lap)

Year	Team	1	2	3	4	5	6	7	8	9	10	11	12	13	14	15	16	17	Pos	Points
2003	CD Sport	BRN; 1	BRN; 2	ASS; 1 DNQ	ASS; 2; 16	OSC; 1 Ret	OSC; 2; 12	DON; 1 DNQ	DON; 2; 21										30th	0
2004	Graff Racing	MNZ; 1 Ret	MNZ; 2; 10	VAL; 1; 12	VAL; 2; 10	MAG; 1; 24	MAG; 2; 16	HOC; 1; 26	HOC; 2; 11	BRN; 1; 13	BRN; 2; 11	DON; 1 Ret	DON; 2; 19	SPA; 27	IMO; 1; 14	IMO; 2; 10	OSC; 1; 10	OSC; 2 Ret	24th	10
2005	Graff Racing	ZOL; 1 Ret	ZOL; 2; 6	VAL; 1; 22	VAL; 2 Ret	LMS; 1; 10	LMS; 2; 11	BIL; 1; 13	BIL; 2; 16	OSC; 1; 20	OSC; 2; 18	DON; 1; 22	DON; 2; 14	EST; 1; 22	EST; 2 Ret	MNZ; 1; 6	MNZ; 2; 4		16th	17
2006	Graff Racing	ZOL; 1	ZOL; 2	IST; 1	IST; 2	MIS; 1	MIS; 2	NÜR; 1	NÜR; 2	DON; 1	DON; 2	LMS; 1; 15	LMS; 2; 12	CAT; 1	CAT; 2				NC†	0

^{†} As Canal was a guest driver, he was ineligible for points.

=== Complete European Le Mans Series results ===
(key) (Races in bold indicate pole position; results in italics indicate fastest lap)

Year	Entrant	Class	Chassis	Engine	1	2	3	4	5	6	Rank	Points
2010	Larbre Compétition	GT1	Saleen S7-R	Ford 7.0 L V8	**LEC**; 1	SPA	ALG	HUN	SIL		3rd	33
2011	Larbre Compétition	GTE AM	Chevrolet Corvette C6.R	Chevrolet 5.5 L V8	LEC	SPA; 3	IMO; 2	SIL; 4	EST		NC	0
2015	Krohn Racing	LMP2	Ligier JS P2	Judd HK 3.6 L V8	SIL	IMO	RBR; 5	LEC	EST		18th	10
2016	Greaves Motorsport	LMP2	Ligier JS P2	Nissan VK45DE 4.5 L V8	SIL; 8	IMO; 8	RBR; 6	LEC; 6	SPA; 4	EST; Ret	10th	36
2018	Panis Barthez Competition	LMP2	Ligier JS P217	Gibson GK428 4.2 L V8	LEC; 8	MNZ; 7	RBR; 10	**SIL**; 6	SPA; 3‡	ALG; 2	9th	45.5
2019	Panis Barthez Competition	LMP2	Ligier JS P217	Gibson GK428 4.2 L V8	LEC; 10	MNZ; 9	CAT; 15	SIL; 7	SPA; 8	ALG; 7	18th	19.5
2020	Panis Racing	LMP2	Oreca 07	Gibson GK428 4.2 L V8	LEC; Ret	SPA; 3	LEC; 4	MNZ; 5	ALG; 5		4th	47
2021	Panis Racing	LMP2	Oreca 07	Gibson GK428 4.2 L V8	CAT; 2	RBR; 14	LEC; 8	MNZ; 1	SPA; 3	ALG; 4	3rd	74.5
2022	Panis Racing	LMP2	Oreca 07	Gibson GK428 4.2 L V8	LEC; 3	IMO; 4	MNZ; 2	**CAT**; 2	SPA; 4	ALG; 2	2nd	94

=== Complete FIA World Endurance Championship results ===
Year	Entrant	Class	Car	Engine	1	2	3	4	5	6	7	8	9	Rank	Points
2012	Larbre Compétition	LMGTE Am	Chevrolet Corvette C6.R	Chevrolet 5.5 L V8	SEB; Ret	SPA; 4	LMS; 1	SIL; EX	SÃO; EX	BHR; 4	FUJ; 1	SHA; 1		56th†	1.5
2013	Larbre Compétition	LMGTE Am	Chevrolet Corvette C6.R	Chevrolet 5.5 L V8	SIL; 2	SPA; 3	LMS; 4	SÃO; 6	COA; 6	FUJ; 8	SHA; 5	BHR; 4		5th	97
2014	G-Drive Racing	LMP2	Morgan LMP2	Nissan VK45DE 4.5 L V8	**SIL**; 1	SPA; 1	**LMS**; Ret							**2nd**	**137**
2014	G-Drive Racing	LMP2	Ligier JS P2	Nissan VK45DE 4.5 L V8				**COA**; 3	**FUJ**; 1	**SHA**; 1	**BHR**; 3	**SÃO**; Ret		**2nd**	**137**
2015	G-Drive Racing	LMP2	Ligier JS P2	Nissan VK45DE 4.5 L V8	SIL; 1	**SPA**; 9	LMS; 2	NÜR; 2	**COA**; 1	**FUJ**; 1	**SHA**; 2	BHR; 1		1st	178
2016	Manor	LMP2	Oreca 05	Nissan VK45DE 4.5 L V8	SIL	SPA	LMS	NÜR	MEX	COA	FUJ	SHA	BHR; 7	46th	6
2017	Vaillante Rebellion	LMP2	Oreca 07	Gibson GK428 4.2 L V8	SIL; 2	SPA; 2	LMS; 6	NÜR; 2	MEX; 1	COA; 3	FUJ; 1	**SHA**; 1	BHR; 1	1st	186
2018–19	Larbre Compétition	LMP2	Ligier JS P217	Gibson GK428 4.2 L V8	SPA; 6									20th	8
2018–19	Panis Barthez Competition	LMP2	Ligier JS P217	Gibson GK428 4.2 L V8		LMS; 9	SIL	FUJ	SHA	SEB	SPA	LMS; 8		20th	8
2023	Alpine Elf Team	LMP2	Oreca 07	Gibson GK428 4.2 L V8	SEB; 8	PRT; 8	SPA; 7	LMS; 4	MNZ; 2	FUJ; 5	BHR; 7			7th	83

^{†} There was no LMGTE Am drivers championship that year, the result indicates standings in overall standings.
^{*} Season still in progress.

=== Complete 24 Hours of Le Mans results ===
Year	Team	Co-Drivers	Car	Class	Laps	Pos.	Class Pos.
2010	(France) Larbre Compétition	(France) Roland Bervillé (Switzerland) Gabriele Gardel	Saleen S7-R	GT1	331	13th	**1st**
2011	(France) Larbre Compétition	(France) Patrick Bornhauser (Switzerland) Gabriele Gardel	Chevrolet Corvette C6.R	GTE; Am	302	20th	**1st**
2012	(France) Larbre Compétition	(France) Patrick Bornhauser (Portugal) Pedro Lamy	Chevrolet Corvette C6.R	GTE; Am	329	20th	**1st**
2013	(France) Larbre Compétition	(France) Patrick Bornhauser (United States) Ricky Taylor	Chevrolet Corvette C6.R	GTE; Am	302	29th	5th
2014	(Russia) G-Drive Racing	(Russia) Roman Rusinov (France) Olivier Pla	Morgan LMP2-Nissan	LMP2	120	DNF	DNF
2015	(Russia) G-Drive Racing	(Russia) Roman Rusinov (United Kingdom) Sam Bird	Ligier JS P2-Nissan	LMP2	358	11th	**3rd**
2016	(United Kingdom) Greaves Motorsport	(France) Nathanaël Berthon (Mexico) Memo Rojas	Ligier JS P2-Nissan	LMP2	348	10th	6th
2017	(Switzerland) Vaillante Rebellion	(Brazil) Bruno Senna (France) Nicolas Prost	Oreca 07-Gibson	LMP2	340	16th	14th
2018	(France) Panis Barthez Competition	(France) Timothé Buret (United Kingdom) Will Stevens	Ligier JS P217-Gibson	LMP2	352	13th	9th
2019	(France) Panis Barthez Competition	(Austria) René Binder (United Kingdom) Will Stevens	Ligier JS P217-Gibson	LMP2	362	13th	8th
2020	(France) Panis Racing	(France) Nico Jamin (France) Matthieu Vaxivière	Oreca 07-Gibson	LMP2	368	7th	**3rd**
2021	(France) Panis Racing	(Australia) James Allen (United Kingdom) Will Stevens	Oreca 07-Gibson	LMP2	362	8th	**3rd**
2022	(France) Panis Racing	(France) Nico Jamin (Netherlands) Job van Uitert	Oreca 07-Gibson	LMP2	366	16th	12th
2023	(France) Alpine Elf Team	(France) Charles Milesi (France) Matthieu Vaxivière	Oreca 07-Gibson	LMP2	327	12th	4th

=== Complete WeatherTech SportsCar Championship results ===
(key) (Races in bold indicate pole position) (Races in italics indicate fastest lap)

Year	Team	Class	Make	Engine	1	2	3	4	5	6	7	8	9	10	Pos.	Points
2017	PR1/Mathiasen Motorsports	P	Ligier JS P217	Gibson GK428 4.2 L V8	DAY	SEB	LBH	AUS	BEL	WGL	MOS	ELK	LGA	ATL; 10	41st	21
2023	AF Corse	LMP2	Oreca 07	Gibson GK428 4.2 L V8	DAY; 3	SEB	LGA	WGL	ELK	IMS	PET				NC	0

^{*} Season still in progress.

Sporting positions
Preceded by Sergey Zlobin	FIA Endurance Trophy for LMP2 Drivers; 2015; With: Sam Bird & Roman Rusinov	Succeeded by Gustavo Menezes; Nicolas Lapierre; Stephane Richelmi
Preceded by Nicolas Lapierre; Gustavo Menezes; Stephane Richelmi	FIA Endurance Trophy for LMP2 Drivers; 2017; With: Bruno Senna	Succeeded by Nicolas Lapierre; André Negrão; Pierre Thiriet
