= Aston Martin DBR9 =

British racing car

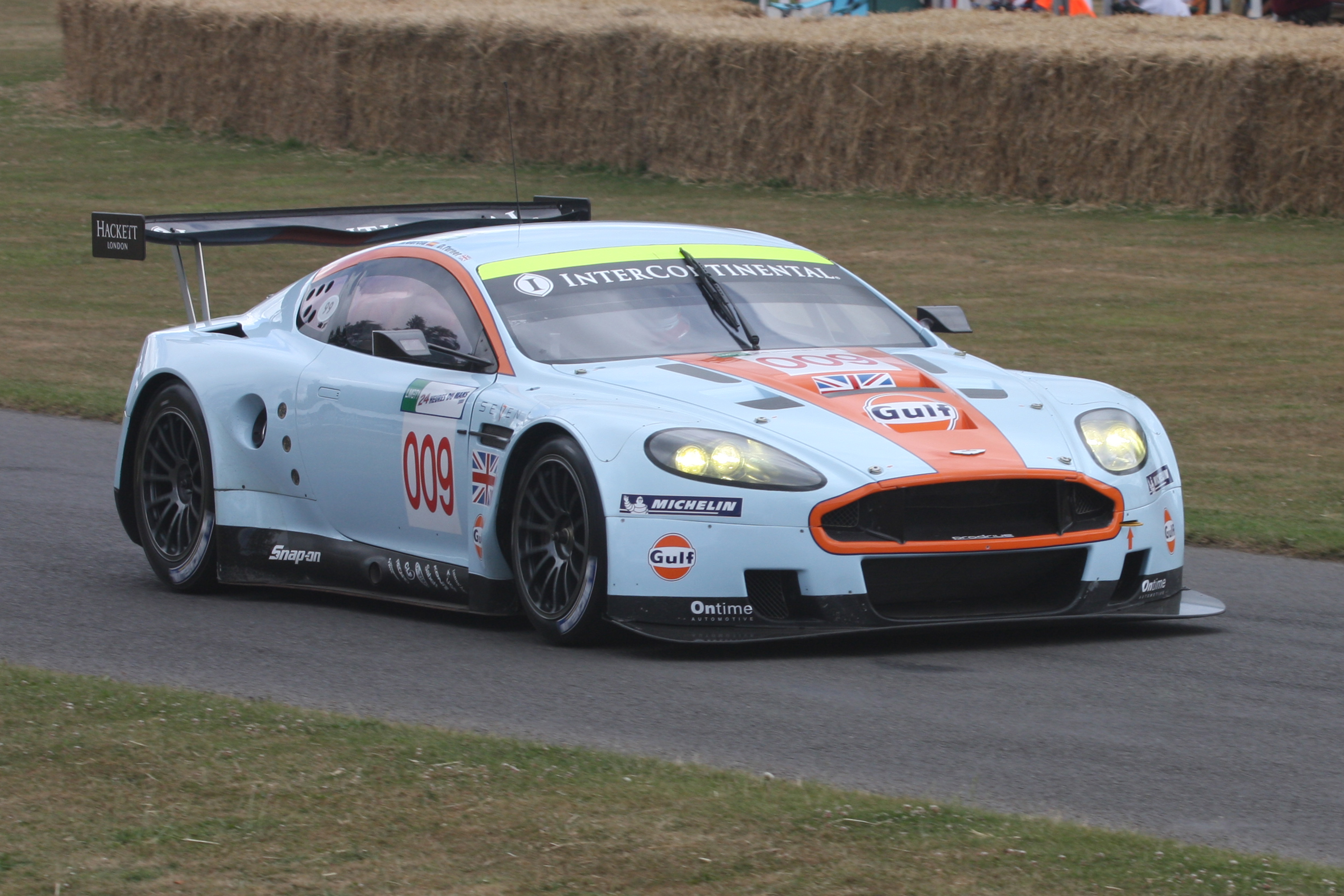
- An Aston Martin DBR9 at the 2008 Goodwood Festival of Speed
- Category: GT1
- Constructor: Aston Martin (Prodrive)
- Designers: Henrik Fisker (chief designer); Graham Humphrys (Chief Engineer for Motorsport, Aston Martin)

Technical specifications
- Chassis: Aluminium frame, with Carbon fibre panels
- Suspension (front): Double wishbone with adjustable Koni dampers
- Suspension (rear): Double wishbone with adjustable Koni dampers
- Length: 4,687 mm (184.5 in)
- Width: 1,978 mm (77.9 in)
- Height: 1,195 mm (47.0 in)
- Wheelbase: 2,741 mm (107.9 in)
- Engine: Aston Martin AM04 6,000 cc (6.0 L; 366.1 cu in), all aluminium, DOHC, 48 valve V12 naturally aspirated, 625 bhp (466 kW; 634 PS), 746 N⋅m (550 lb⋅ft), front-engined, longitudinally mounted
- Transmission: Xtrac 6-speed sequential manual
- Weight: 1,170 kg (2,579 lb)
- Tyres: Michelin

Competition history
- Notable entrants: (United Kingdom) Aston Martin Racing (Italy) Aston Martin Racing BMS (France) Aston Martin Racing Larbre (United Kingdom) Team Modena (Austria) Jetalliance Racing
- Debut: 2005 12 Hours of Sebring
- Teams' Championships: 2 (2006 LMS) (2011 FIA GT1)
- Constructors' Championships: 1 (2006 FIA GT)
- Drivers' Championships: 1 (2006 LMS)

The Aston Martin DBR9 is a racing car built by Aston Martin Racing, debuting in 2005 and racing actively in international sportscar racing until the end of GT1 category in 2011. The name DBR9 is derived from the original 24 Hours of Le Mans-winning DBR1 car, named for then-owner David Brown, which not only won the 24 Hour race in 1959 but also the World Sportscar title. The car is most famous for taking two LMGT1 class wins at Le Mans 24 Hours (2007 and 2008) by the Aston Martin Racing factory team.

== Development ==
Based on the Aston Martin DB9 road car, the DBR9 retains the chassis, engine block, and cylinder heads of the road car's V12 engine. The rest of the car is re-engineered for high performance competition use. The DBR9's bodywork is a blend of optimum aerodynamic performance and the styling of the DB9 road car. All the body panels are constructed from carbon fibre composite (except the roof) to minimize the weight of the car. To complete the aerodynamic body, the bottom of the car is flat all the way from the front to the rear diffuser. To optimise rear downforce a carbon fibre wing has been added. The engine develops 625 bhp (466 kW; 634 PS) and 746 N⋅m (550 lb⋅ft) of torque, using two 31.2 mm (1.2-inch) air restrictors. Completely unrestricted, however, this engine is capable of developing over 750 bhp (559 kW; 760 PS), and over 880 N⋅m (649 lb⋅ft) of torque. The DBR9 goes from 0 to 60 mph (97 km/h) in 3.4 seconds, and 0 to 100 mph (161 km/h) in 6.4 seconds.

For the 2007 24 Hours of Le Mans, Prodrive made modifications to the DBR9 design to not only improve performance, but also to increase driver comfort in the cockpit. Due to new regulations put into place by Le Mans organizers, the DBR9 required the installation of an air conditioning unit, to prevent overstressing drivers. Prodrive went further by putting a heat-resistant white roof on all new cars to assist in keeping cockpit temperatures down. Performance modifications included the removal of two, now immaterial, cooling vents from side mirrors of the car improving the aerodynamics.

== Racing history ==
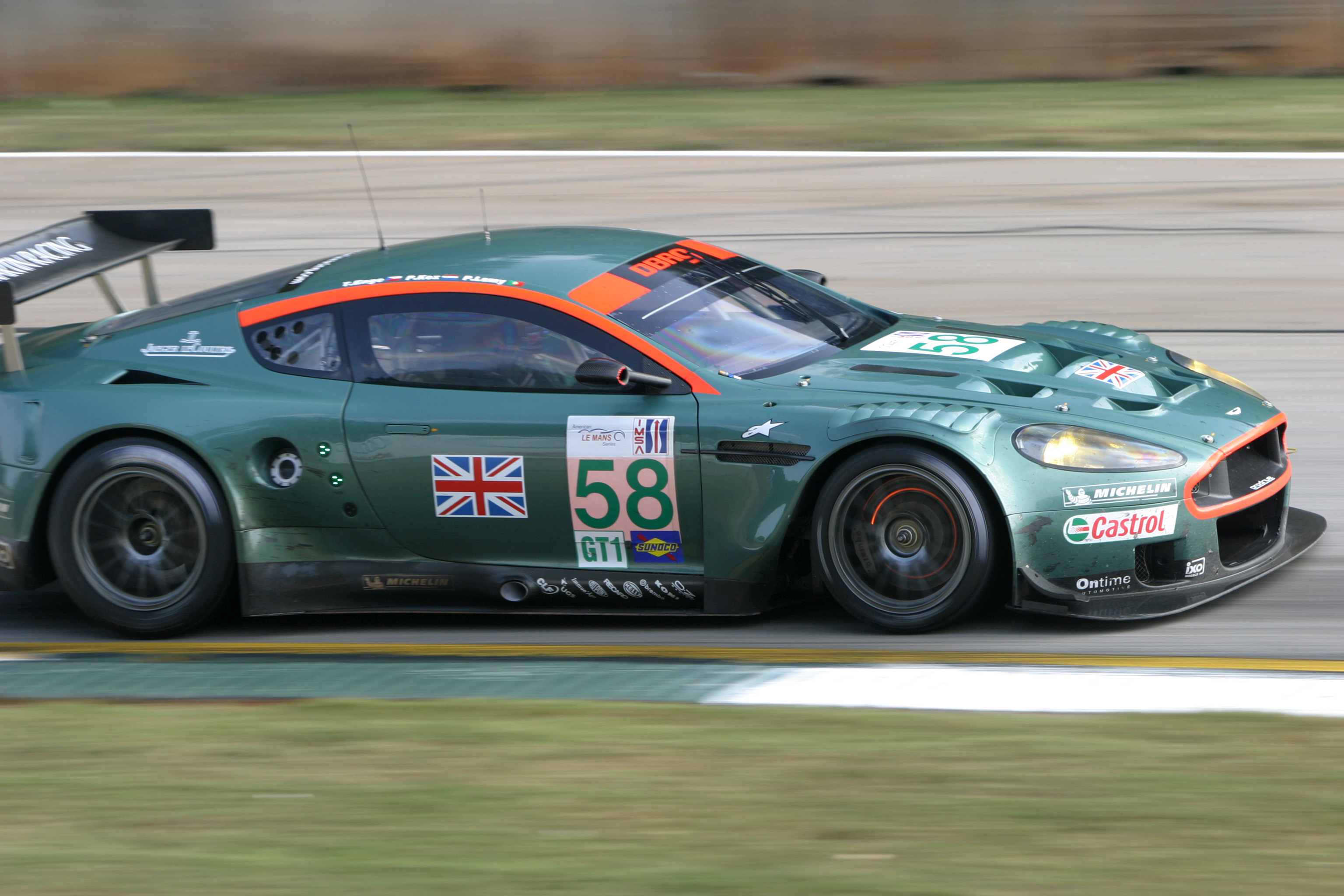
A DBR9 running in the 2005 Petit Le Mans at Road Atlanta.

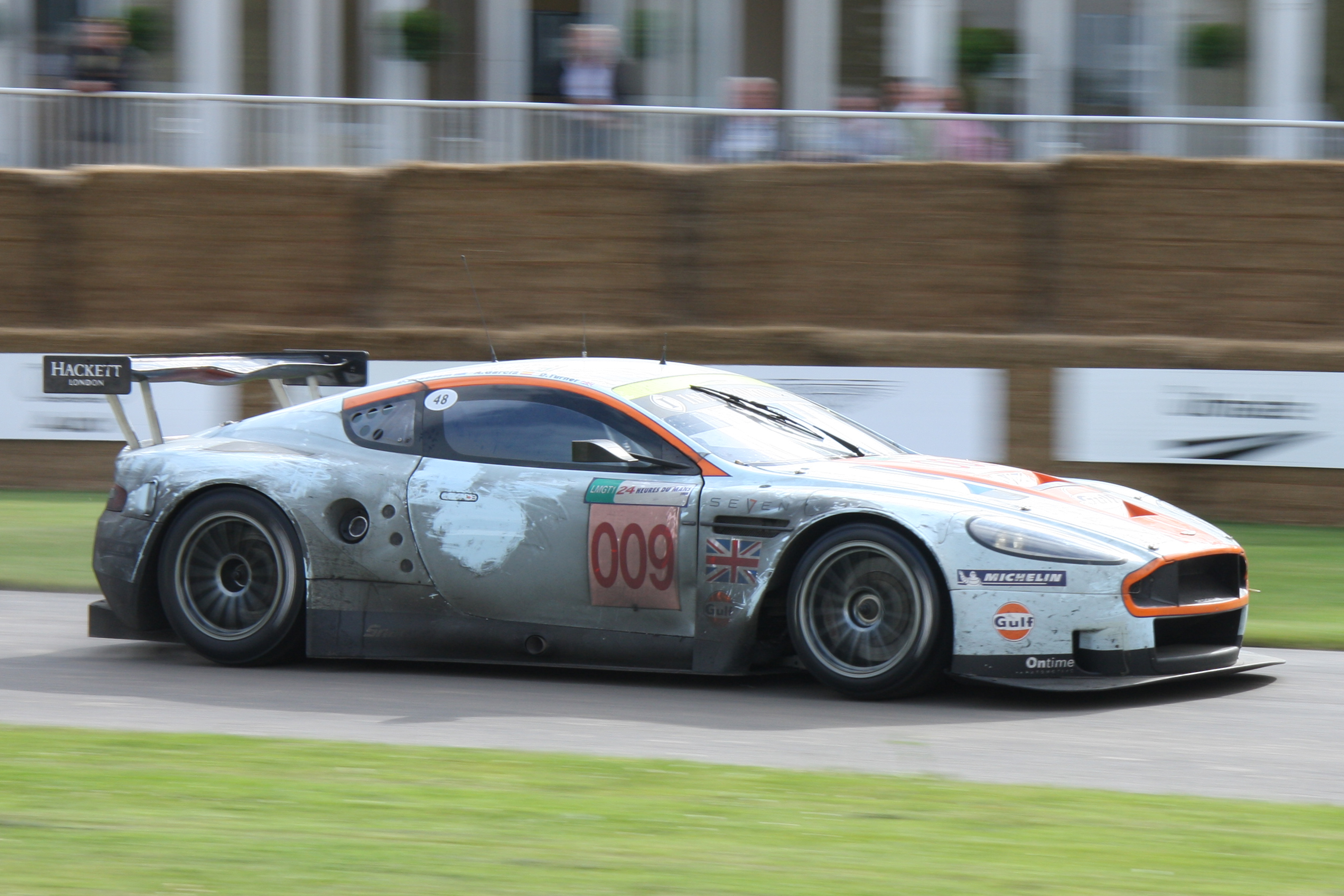
The 2008 Le Mans GT1 class winner at the Goodwood Festival of Speed.

The DBR9 won the Sebring 12 Hours for its LMGT1 category in 2005, but came third in Le Mans 24 Hour behind arch-rivals Corvette Racing due to fuel problems. In 2006, the DBR9 was unable to repeat its success at Sebring, finishing second behind a Corvette. A similar situation occurred at Le Mans as well. Despite not winning Sebring and Le Mans, Aston Martin Racing regularly challenged Corvette Racing for victory in the rest of the American Le Mans Series schedule, with victories at Lime Rock Park, Miller Motorsports Park, Mosport, Petit Le Mans, and Mazda Raceway Laguna Seca. Aston Martin capped their 2006 ALMS season by finishing second in the GT1 Manufacturer's Championship, earning the factory team an automatic entry to the 2007 24 Hours of Le Mans.

In the Le Mans Endurance Series, Larbre Compétition took the Team's Championship, with victories at the 1000 Kilometres of Istanbul and 1000 Kilometres of the Nurburgring, a second-place finish at the 1000 Kilometres of Jarama, and a fifth-place finish at the 1000 Kilometres of Donington.

The DBR9 came into the 2006 FIA GT Championship being title contender favourites, but the season was somewhat lacklustre with only two victories at Mugello and Dubai. The Phoenix Racing Aston Martin DBR9 narrowly missed out on victory at the 24 Hours of Spa-Francorchamps. BMS Scuderia Italia cited a problem with finding the right tyre compound with their Pirellis as the factor for their lack of success.

For 2007, Aston Martin was finally able to overcome their woes at Le Mans, securing the GT1 class victory for the #009 Aston Martin Racing DBR9. Larbre's DBR9 would also manage third place in class. The teams running DBR9s managed to finish every car entered. To celebrate the victory, Aston Martin built a very limited edition of the DB9 called the DB9 LM (Le Mans), which featured a unique colour, called the Sarthe Silver (named to the track where the Le Mans racing is held), also DBS clear taillights, specific wheels, Magnum silver meshes and crossbar, Sport Pack as standard, a specific interior with red stitching and tertre rouge facia trim. All cars were individually numbered.

Later in 2007, Aston Martin launched another limited production, the DBS road car which has many styling cues taken from the DBR9 in conjunction with the James Bond film Casino Royale. Aston Martin Racing's DBR9s raced 2006 and 2007 under the numbers 007 and 009, in honour of James Bond. Unlike the DB9 LM, which was an ultra-exclusive (only 60 built) cosmetic package, the DBS brought many technology from the racing world. A lot of carbon fiber and aluminium used in the body, a serious power upgrade to the engine and a new interior.

In 2008, while Larbre and Scuderia Italia moved on from Aston Martin, Prodrive continued to field a two-car factory team at the 24 Hours of Le Mans. The #009 numbered car, with the new Gulf Oil sponsored paint scheme, driven by Darren Turner, Antonio Garcia and David Brabham, won its class.

A Le Mans-spec DBR9 participated in the 2009 Super GT season, marking Aston Martin's debut in the series.

== Teams ==
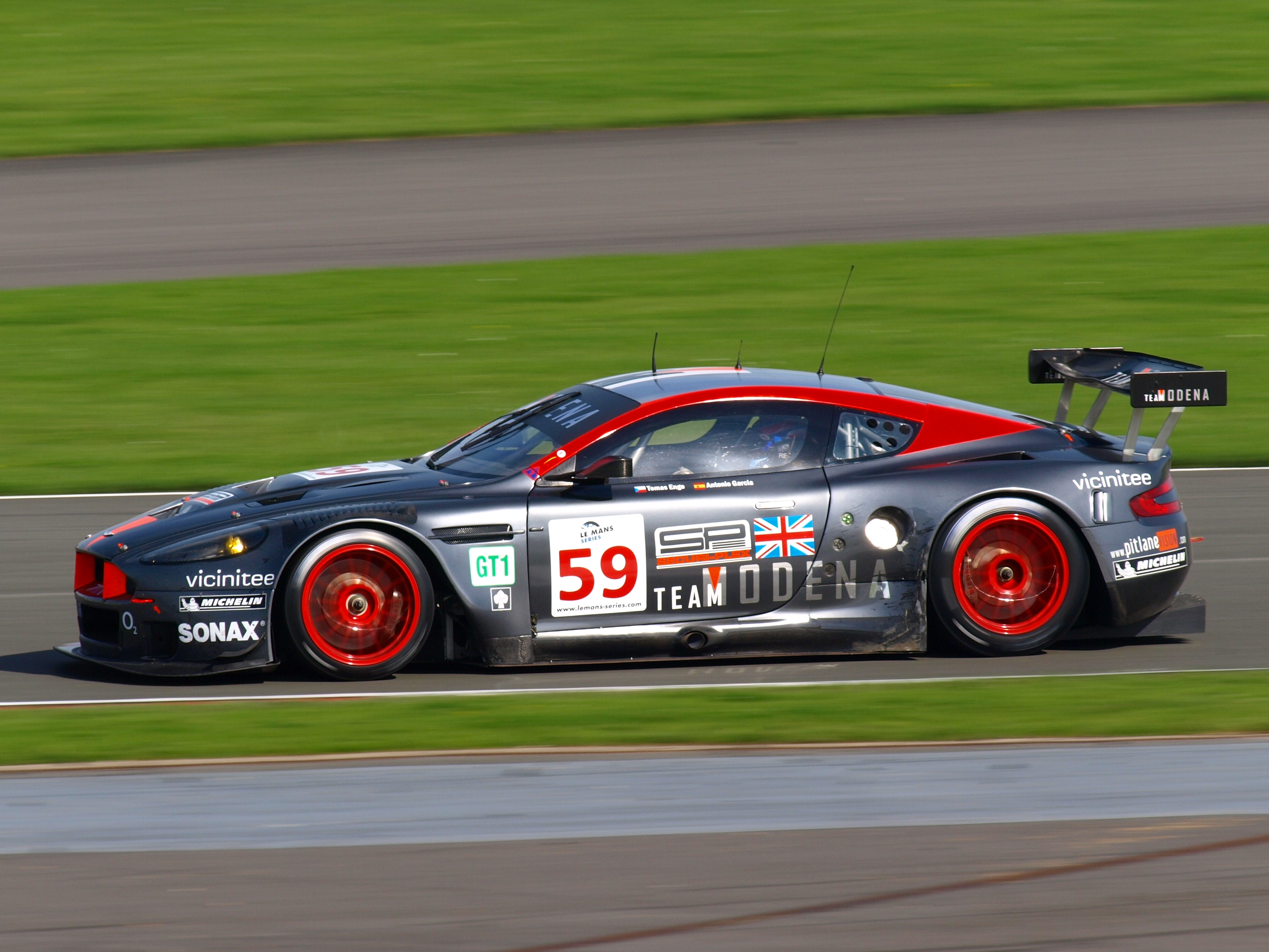
Team Modena's DBR9, the first customer chassis built

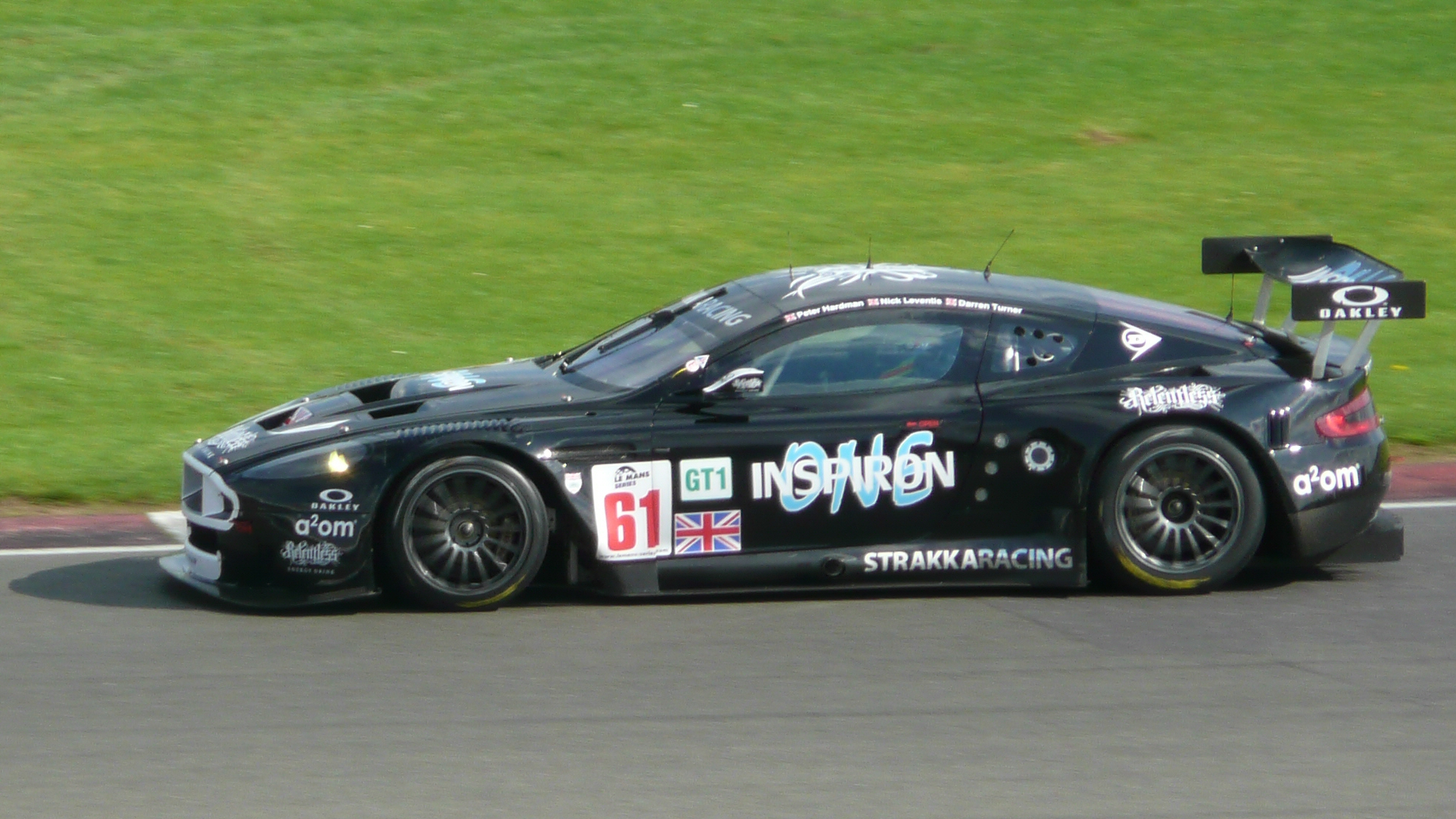
Strakka Racing's DBR9, at Silverstone Circuit in 2008

The Aston Martin DBR9 was last run by two customers team in the FIA GT1 World Championship. In the past, there were up to three factory teams and the car has also been sold to customers for private use in various racing series, such as the American Le Mans Series, Le Mans Series, FIA GT Championship, FFSA GT Championship, and Super GT.

=== Past factory teams ===
- (United Kingdom) Aston Martin Racing, run by Prodrive (2005–2008)
- (France) Aston Martin Racing Larbre, run by Larbre Compétition (2005–2007)
- (Italy) Aston Martin Racing BMS, run by BMS Scuderia Italia (2005–2007)

=== Past customer teams ===
- (United Kingdom) Team Modena, formerly Cirtek Racing (2005–2008)
- (Austria) Jetalliance Racing, formerly RaceAlliance (2006–2009)
- (Germany) Phoenix Racing (2006–2007)
- (United Kingdom) Barwell Motorsports (2007)
- (United Kingdom) Gigawave Motorsport (2007–2009)
- (United States) Bell Motorsports (2008)
- (United Kingdom) Strakka Racing, also under the Vitaphone Racing banner (2008)
- (Japan) Team Nova (2009)
- (France) Hexis AMR (2010–2011)
- (Germany) Young Driver AMR, run by Fischer Racing (2010–2011)

== Chassis ==
A total of 16 DBR9 chassis were made including a few upgraded chassis' over the five years it has raced so far.

=== Chassis history ===
- DBR9/1

The first DBR9 chassis to be built and raced at Le Mans in 2005 under Aston Martin Racing, qualified on pole and finished 3rd in class. In 2005, it also competed in the 12 Hours of Sebring, winning the GT1 class and finishing fourth overall. In 2006, Larbre Compétition only raced this chassis at the Le Mans Series but, in 2007 they raced it in the FFSA GT Championship and the 2007 24 Hours of Le Mans.

This chassis competed in the 2010 FIA GT1 World Championship season and 2011 FIA GT1 World Championship season with the Hexis AMR team, eventually winning the 2011 Team's championship.

- DBR9/2

Another factory Aston Martin Racing DBR9 that only picked up one class win and best overall finish of second. Raced in the 2011 FIA GT1 World Championship season for Hexis AMR as Car number 4.

- DBR9/3

Entered by Aston Martin Racing for the 2006 24 Hours of Le Mans and competing in the full 2006 American Le Mans Series season and got two class wins. Also raced by Larbre Compétition at the 2007 24 Hours of Le Mans.

- DBR9/4

Raced by Team Modena in 2006 and then in 2008 by Strakka Racing who raced at the 2008 24 Hours of Le Mans under the Vitaphone Racing Team banner. Achieved one class win in the LMS in 2006.

- DBR9/5

Raced by Bell Motorsports in the 2008 American Le Mans Series season. No class wins, 4 podiums out of 6 races entered.

- DBR9/6

Raced by BMS Scuderia Italia under the name Aston Martin Racing BMS. Raced a full 2007 FIA GT Championship season.

- DBR9/7

Another Aston Martin Racing BMS car. No podiums or class wins despite entering a full 2006 FIA GT Championship season.

- DBR9/8

Raced by Aston Martin Racing in the 2006 American Le Mans Series season and the 2008 24 Hours of Le Mans where it won in the GT1 class. Also raced by BMS Scuderia Italia in the 2007 FIA GT Championship season.

- DBR9/9

Raced by BMS Scuderia Italia at the 2006 and 2007 FIA GT Championship seasons where it picked no wins. Written off at the 24 Hours of Spa in 2007.

- DBR9/10

Only raced at the 2007 24 Hours of Le Mans where it won in the GT1 class and finished fifth overall.

- DBR9/101

Raced under privateer teams under Russian Age Racing who also raced alongside Cirtek Motorsport in 2005 and 2006 who picked up two wins. It was then owned by Team Modena who raced it in 2007 and 2008 including appearances at Le Mans, and Le Mans Series, gaining 4 victories.

- DBR9/102

Scheduled to race at the 2006 Mil Milhas Brasileiras under Capuava Racing Team but had engine problems in practice.

- DBR9/103

Only raced by Jetalliance Racing from 2006 right up to the 2009 24 Hours of Le Mans. In the three years it picked up 4 wins.

- DBR9/104

Raced by Phoenix racing in a full 2006 FIA GT Championship season and only raced once in 2007. It only achieved one win but seven podiums.

- DBR9/105

Another DBR9 raced by Jetalliance Racing including three wins and four podiums in the 2008 FIA GT Championship season.

- DBR9/106

Raced by Gigawave Motorsport in 2008 and picked up five podiums. It was meant to race at the 2009 24 Hours of Le Mans but Gigawave ditched the DBR9 to focus on the Nissan GT-R GT1 programme. The car was used in Gigawave's first Le Man Series race of 2009, the final round at Silverstone, where it won the GT1 class.

- DBR9/109

Built for the 2010 FIA GT1 World Championship season; it raced in the early part of the season. It was also entered for the 1000 km of Spa, where it was extensively damaged in an accident.

=== 24 Hours of Le Mans results ===
Year	Team	Drivers	Car #	Class	Laps	Pos.	Class Pos.
2005	(United Kingdom) Aston Martin Racing	(Netherlands) Peter Kox (Portugal) Pedro Lamy (Czech Republic) Tomas Enge	58	GT1	327	DNF	DNF
2005	(United Kingdom) Aston Martin Racing	(Australia) David Brabham (France) Stephane Sarrazin (United Kingdom) Darren Turner	59	GT1	333	9th	3rd
2006	(United Kingdom) Aston Martin Racing	(Czech Republic) Tomas Enge (Italy) Andrea Piccini (United Kingdom) Darren Turner	007	GT1	350	6th	2nd
2006	(United Kingdom) Aston Martin Racing	(Portugal) Pedro Lamy (France) Stephane Sarrazin (Monaco) Stephane Ortelli	009	GT1	342	10th	5th
2006	(Russia) Russian Age Racing (United Kingdom) Team Modena	(Spain) Antonio Garcia (Australia) David Brabham (Brazil) Nelson Piquet Jr	62	GT1	343	9th	4th
2006	(Italy) BMS Scuderia Italia	(Italy) Fabrizio Gollin (Italy) Fabio Babini (Italy) Christian Pescatori	69	GT1	3	DNF	DNF
2007	(France) Larbre Compétition	(France) Patrick Bornhauser (France) Roland Bervillé (United Kingdom) Gregor Fisken	006	GT1	272	29th	13th
2007	(United Kingdom) Aston Martin Racing	(Czech Republic) Tomas Enge (United Kingdom) Johnny Herbert (Netherlands) Peter Kox	007	GT1	337	9th	4th
2007	(France) Larbre Compétition	(France) Christophe Bouchut (Italy) Fabrizio Gollin (Denmark) Casper Elgaard	008	GT1	341	7th	3rd
2007	(United Kingdom) Aston Martin Racing	(Australia) David Brabham (Sweden) Rickard Rydell (United Kingdom) Darren Turner	009	GT1	343	5th	1st
2007	(United Kingdom) Team Modena	(Spain) Antonio Garcia (Netherlands) Jos Menten (Brazil) Christian Fittipaldi	59	GT1	318	17th	10th
2007	(Italy) BMS Scuderia Italia	(Italy) Fabio Babini (United Kingdom) Jamie Davies (Italy) Matteo Malucelli	100	GT1	318	11th	6th
2008	(United Kingdom) Aston Martin Racing	(Germany) Heinz-Harald Frentzen (Italy) Andrea Piccini (Austria) Karl Wendlinger	007	GT1	339	16th	4th
2008	(United Kingdom) Aston Martin Racing	(Australia) David Brabham (Spain) Antonio Garcia (United Kingdom) Darren Turner	009	GT1	344	13th	1st
2008	(Germany) Vitaphone Racing Team (United Kingdom) Strakka Racing	(United Kingdom) Peter Hardman (United Kingdom) Nick Leventis (Brazil) Alexadre Negrao	53	GT1	82	DNF	DNF
2008	(United Kingdom) Team Modena	(United States) Terry Borcheller (Netherlands) Jos Menten (Brazil) Christian Fittipaldi	59	GT1	302	30th	11th
2009	(Austria) Jetalliance Racing	(Germany) Thomas Gruber (Germany) Lukas Lichtner-Hoyer (Austria) Alex Müller	66	GT1	294	31st	3rd

=== Gallery ===
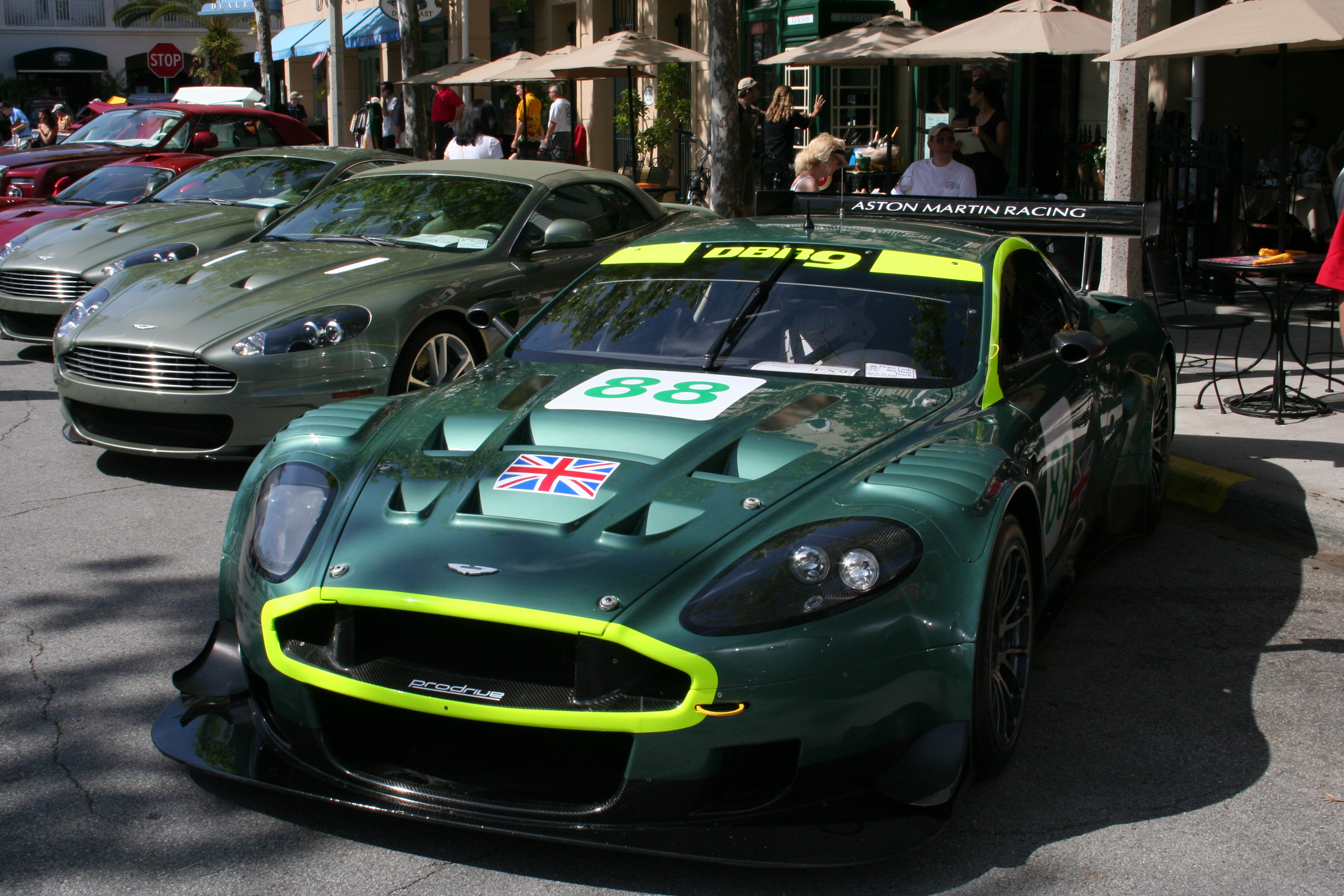
Front quarter

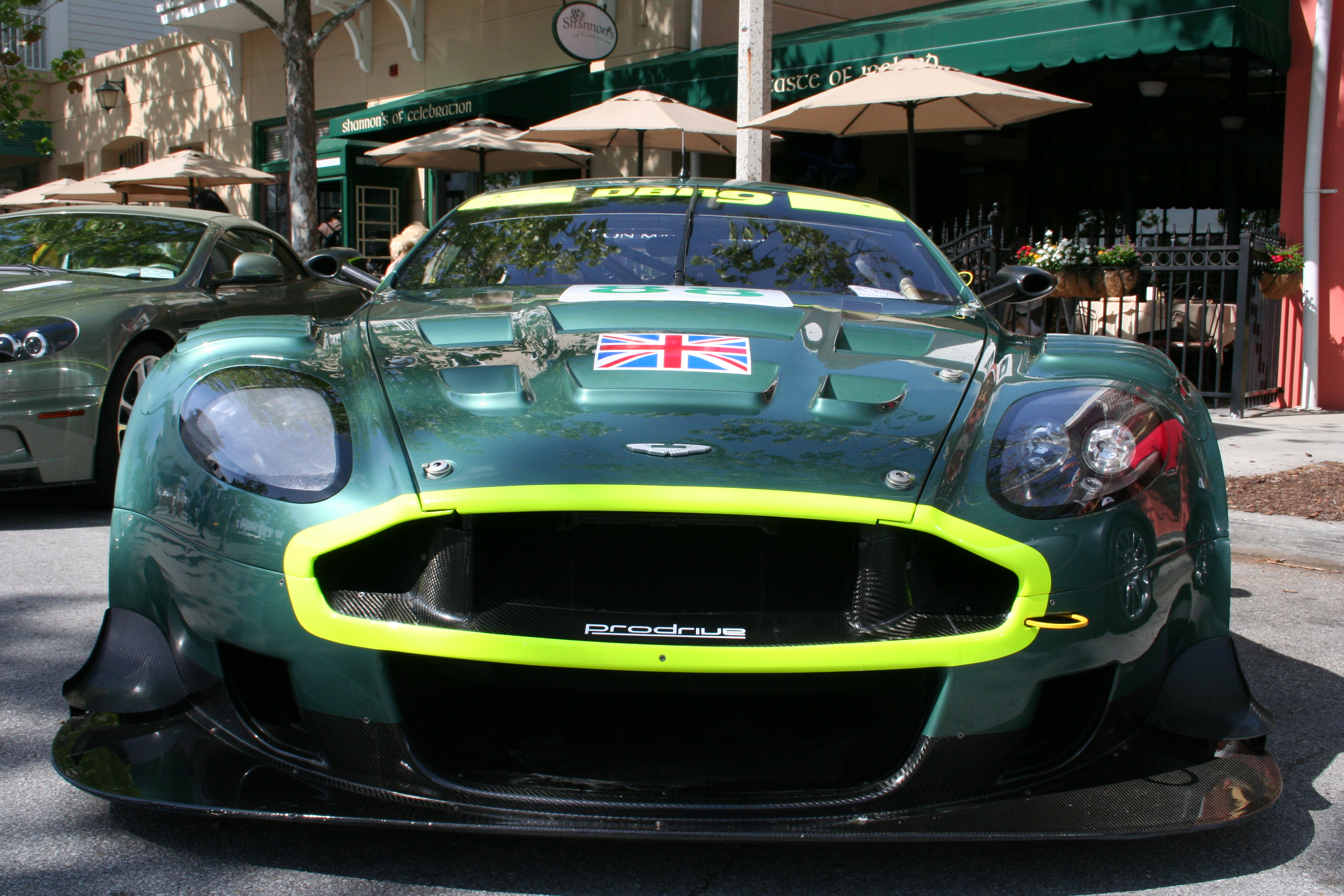
Front

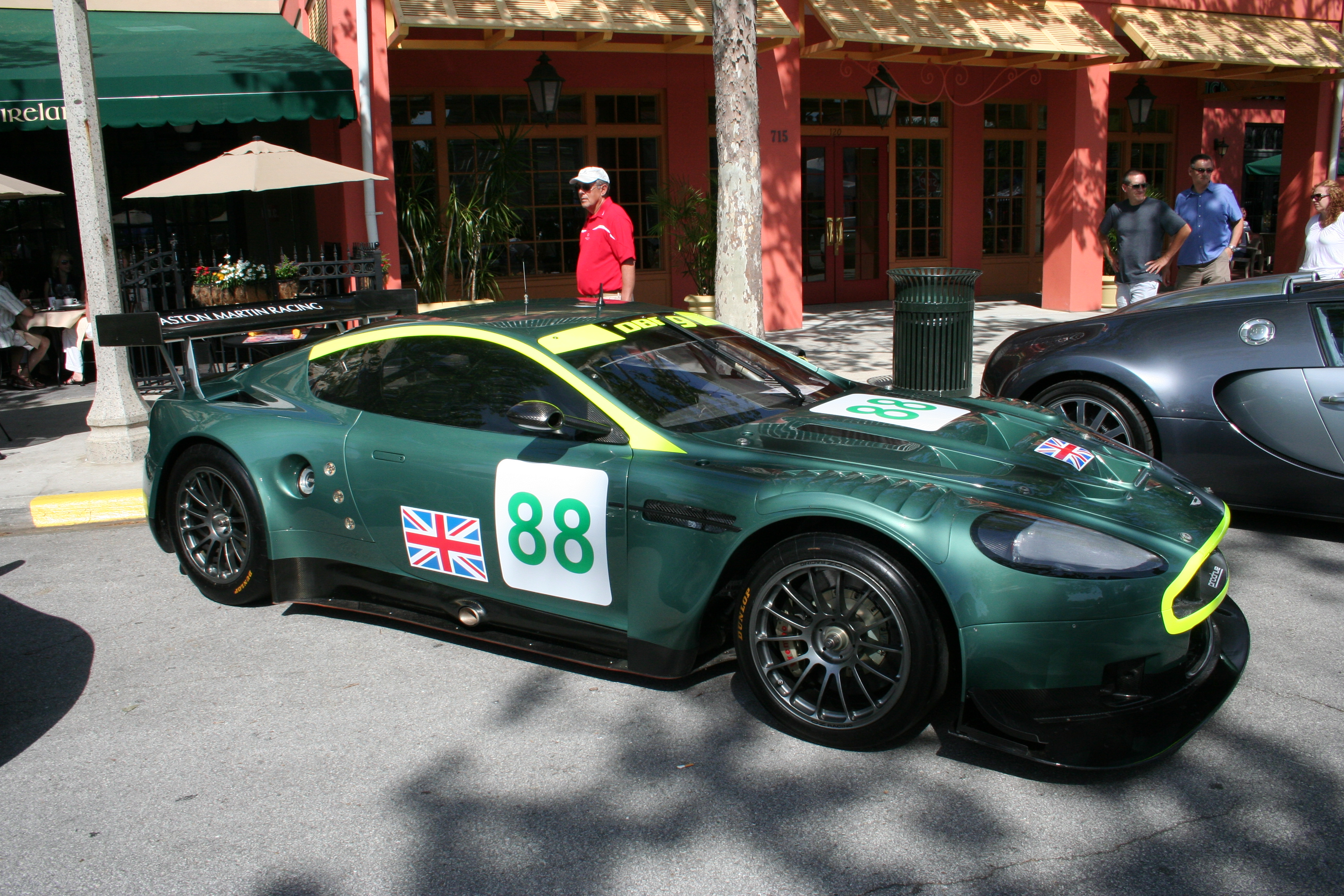
Side

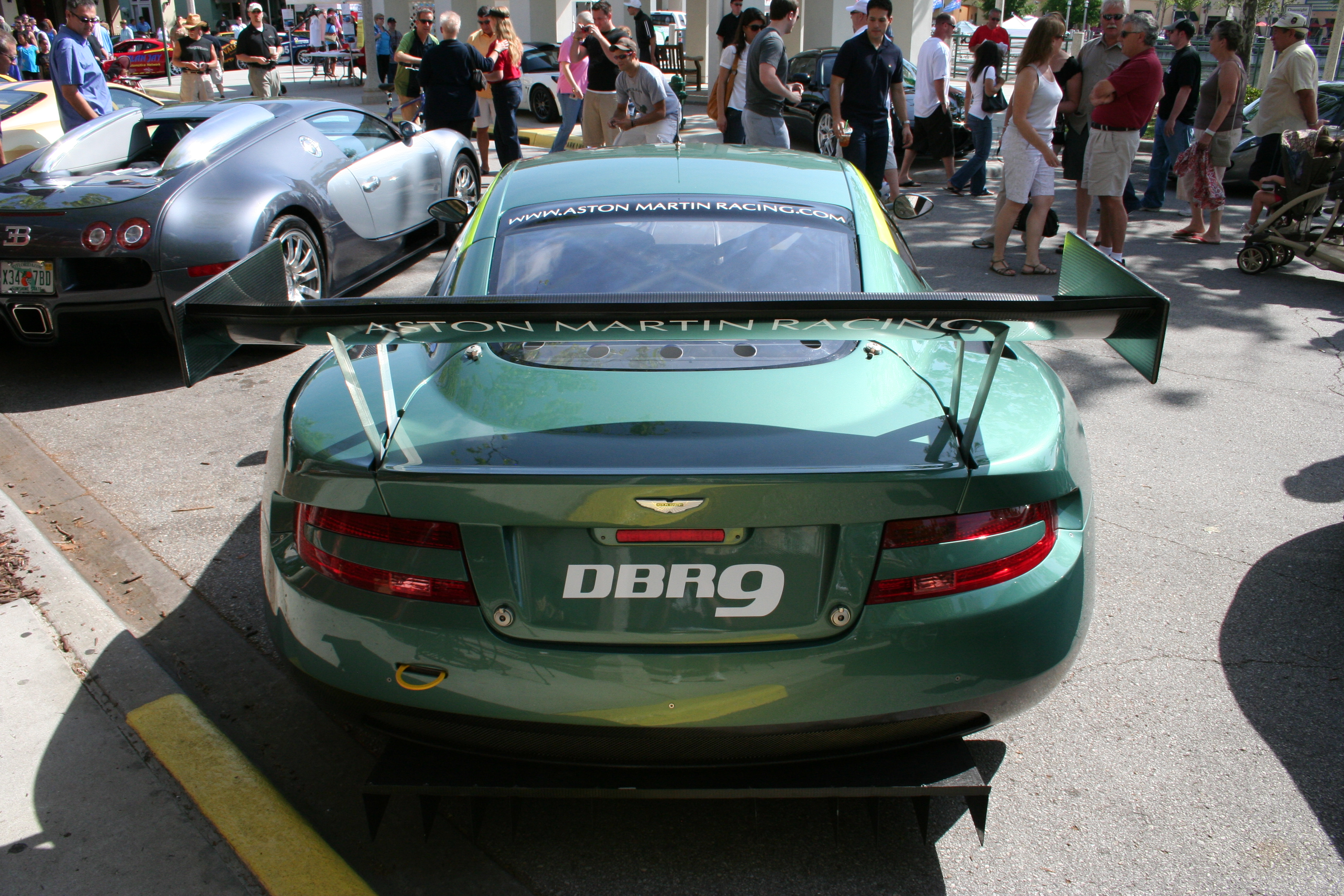
Rear end

=== In fiction ===
In Cars 2, Nigel Gearsley, named after steam locomotive designer, Sir Nigel Gresley, is based on this race car.
