= Le Vigeant =

- Commune
- Coat of arms
- Location of Le Vigeant
- Location within France Location within Nouvelle-Aquitaine
- Coordinates: 46°13′31″N 0°39′01″E
- Country: France
- Region: Nouvelle-Aquitaine
- Department: Vienne
- Arrondissement: Montmorillon
- Canton: Lussac-les-Châteaux

Government
  - Mayor (2020–2026): Pierre Gourmelon
- Area^{1}: 64.36 km^{2} (24.85 sq mi)
- Elevation: 157 m (515 ft)
- Highest elevation: 191 m (627 ft)
- Lowest elevation: 85 m (279 ft)
- Population (2023): 657
  - Density: 10.2/km^{2} (26.4/sq mi)
- Time zone: UTC+01:00 (CET)
  - Summer (DST): UTC+02:00 (CEST)
- INSEE/Postal code: 86289 /86150
- ^{1} French Land Register data, which excludes lakes, ponds, glaciers > 1 km^{2} (0.386 sq mi or 247 acres) and river estuaries.

Le Vigeant (French pronunciation: [lə viʒɑ̃]) is a commune in the Vienne department in the Nouvelle-Aquitaine region in western France.

== See also ==
- Communes of the Vienne department
