= Lifeways Group =

British Care Provider

- Company type: Private limited company
- Industry: Health care
- Founded: 1995
- Founders: Jerry and Susan Bereika
- Headquarters: Lyme Regis, Dorset
- Number of locations: >1,000
- Website: lifeways.co.uk

Lifeways Group is a British social care company founded in 1995, which provides supported living services for some adults. The company has received notable scrutiny, frequently resulting in closures, following a lengthy history of negligence and abuse, as found by Care Quality Commission and local councils.

== History ==
The company was bought for £207m in 2012 by OMERS, which invests Ontario’s municipal employees’ retirement pot. At that time, it had 6,300 staff.

In April 2015 it acquired Autism Care UK which provides supported living, outreach and day services for people with autism in Lincolnshire, Lancashire, Milton Keynes, Northumberland, South Warwickshire and Yorkshire from the Maria Mallaband Care Group.

== Controversies ==
In May 2015 the company bought its learning disability services group from Care UK.

Lifeways hit controversy in recent years for bad quality of care due to some locations having an inadequate Care Quality Commission (CQC) rating, closure of some services by CQC and local councils for abuse and court cases involving staff where they have abused service users in their care.

In 2019, two care workers subjected a disabled woman to abuse at one of their Autism Care facilities in Northumberland.

In 2021, Lifeways were ordered to pay more than £495,000 at Cirencester Magistrates' Court as it failed to protect residents from avoidable harm, although this event was never widely publicised.

In 2023, a deputy manager was charged with stealing £34,000 from a 70-year-old woman with learning difficulties who was under their care.

In 2025, an ITV News investigation published allegations surrounding failures at residential and supported-living homes ran by the care company. Camera footage, obtained from Coventry, showed a young male with significant learning difficulties eating from a bin. In addition, separate revelations indicated that a man with Down's syndrome had required hospital treatment after an infection was left neglected. Lifeways CEO Andrea Kinkade labelled the allegations "appalling" and claimed the staff involved were dismissed.
