= 2015 GT Sports Club =

Seasons
- ← none 2016 →

The 2015 GT Sports Club is the first season of the SRO Group's GT Sports Club, an auto racing series for grand tourer cars. The GT Sports Club is a championship for Bronze and Iron drivers only. Platinum, Gold, Silver and Bronze indicate how professional a driver is. The SRO introduced the new "Iron" categorisation within the Bronze category, for drivers over the age of 60. All drivers must participate with GT3-spec cars, RACB G3 cars or GTE-spec cars. The series maiden race weekend was from 17 to 19 April during the Espíritu de Montjuïc event at Circuit de Barcelona-Catalunya. Max Bianchi won the first overall championship and Martin Lanting won the Iron Cup after the last race of the championship at Misano.

== Calendar ==
| Event | Circuit | Date | Supporting |
|---|---|---|---|
| 1 | Circuit de Barcelona-Catalunya, Montmeló, Spain | 19 April | Espíritu de Montjuïc |
| 2 | Paul Ricard Circuit, Le Castellet, France | 20 June | Blancpain Endurance Series |
| 3 | Algarve International Circuit, Algarve, Portugal | 6 September | Blancpain Sprint Series |
| 4 | Misano World Circuit Marco Simoncelli, Misano, Italy | 4 October | Blancpain Sprint Series |

== Entry list ==
| Team | Car | No. | Driver | Class | Rounds |
|---|---|---|---|---|---|
| (France) SRO Race Centre | Aston Martin DBRS9 GT3 | 6 | (France) Stéphane Ratel | | 1–2 |
| (France) SRO Race Centre | Aston Martin DBRS9 GT3 | 7 | (France) Michel Mhitarian | | 2 |
| (Italy) Scuderia Villorba Corse | Ferrari 458 Italia GT3 | 8 | (France) Cédric Mezard | | All |
| (France) AKKA ASP | Ferrari 458 Italia GT3 | 9 | (France) Gabriel Balthazard | Iron | 2 (QR) |
| (France) AKKA ASP | Ferrari 458 Italia GT3 | 9 | (France) Jean-Luc Beaubelique | | 2 (MR) |
| (France) AKKA ASP | Ferrari 458 Italia GT3 | 10 | (France) Maurice Ricci | | 2 |
| (Belgium) WRT Racing | Audi R8 LMS ultra | 12 | (Belgium) Jean-Michel Baert | | All |
| (France) TDS Racing | BMW Z4 GT3 | 21 | (France) Claude-Yves Gosselin | | 2 |
| (Switzerland) Kessel Racing | Ferrari 458 Italia GT3 | 23 | (Italy) Max Bianchi | | All |
| (Switzerland) Kessel Racing | Ferrari 458 Challenge | 38 | (Hong Kong) Wong Chong Yau Runme | CC | 1 |
| (Switzerland) Kessel Racing | Ferrari 458 Italia GT3 | 111 | (United States) Stephen Earle | Iron | 3 |
| (Germany) Reiter Engineering | Lamborghini Gallardo GT3 | 24 | (South Africa) Naomi Schiff | | 1 |
| (France) Pro GT by Almeras | Porsche 997 GT3-R | 34 | (France) Roland Bervillé | | 2 |
| (Italy) Krypton Motorsport | Porsche 997 GT3-R | 35 | (Italy) Stefano Pezzucchi | | 1–2 |
| (France) Saintéloc Racing | Audi R8 LMS ultra | 36 | (France) Marc Sourd | Iron | 2 |
| (France) Saintéloc Racing | Audi R8 LMS ultra | 37 | (France) Michael Blanchemain | | 2 |
| (Portugal) Sports & You | Mercedes-Benz SLS AMG GT3 | 39 | (Russia) Natalia Freidina | | 3 |
| (Italy) AF Corse | Ferrari 458 Italia GT3 | 42 | (Belgium) Patrick Van Glabeke | | All |
| (Italy) AF Corse | Ferrari 458 Italia GTE | 48 | (Monaco) Martin Lanting | Iron | All |
| (Italy) AF Corse | Ferrari 458 Italia GTE | 51 | (Switzerland) Christoph Ulrich | | 4 |
| (Italy) AF Corse | Ferrari 458 Italia GT3 | 52 | (Italy) Mario Cordoni | | All |
| (Italy) AF Corse | Ferrari 458 Italia GT3 | 53 | (Belgium) Louis-Philippe Soenen | Iron | All |
| (Italy) AF Corse | Ferrari 458 Italia GT3 | 54 | (United States) Michael Luzich | Iron | All |
| (Germany) Attempto Racing | McLaren 650S GT3 | 55 | (Russia) Natalia Freidina | | 2 |
| (Germany) Attempto Racing | Porsche 997 GT3-R | 56 | (Germany) Jürgen Häring | | 2 |
| (Germany) HTP Motorsport | Mercedes-Benz SLS AMG GT3 | 57 | (Netherlands) Wim de Pundert | | 2–4 |
| (Netherlands) Kox Racing | McLaren 650S GT3 | 76 | (Netherlands) Nico Pronk | | 2 |
| (Belgium) NSC Motorsports | Lamborghini Gallardo GT3 | 95 | (Belgium) Thierry Verstraete | | 1–3 |
| (United Kingdom) United Autosports | Audi R8 LMS ultra | 99 | (United Kingdom) Phil Burgan | Iron | 4 |

| Icon | Class |
|---|---|
| Iron | Iron Cup |
| CC | Cup Challenge |

== Race results ==
| Event | Circuit | Pole position | Qualifying Race Winner | Championship Race Winner |
|---|---|---|---|---|
| 1 | (Spain) Catalunya | (Italy) No. 35 Krypton Motorsport | (Italy) No. 35 Krypton Motorsport | (Switzerland) No. 23 Kessel Racing |
| 1 | (Spain) Catalunya | (Italy) Stefano Pezzucchi | (Italy) Stefano Pezzucchi | (Italy) Max Bianchi |
| 2 | (France) Paul Ricard | (Italy) No. 35 Krypton Motorsport | (Italy) No. 35 Krypton Motorsport | (Italy) No. 35 Krypton Motorsport |
| 2 | (France) Paul Ricard | (Italy) Stefano Pezzucchi | (Italy) Stefano Pezzucchi | (Italy) Stefano Pezzucchi |
| 3 | (Portugal) Algarve | (Italy) No. 52 AF Corse | (Italy) No. 52 AF Corse | (Italy) No. 52 AF Corse |
| 3 | (Portugal) Algarve | (Italy) Mario Cordoni | (Italy) Mario Cordoni | (Italy) Mario Cordoni |
| 4 | (Italy) Misano | (Italy) No. 52 AF Corse | (Italy) No. 52 AF Corse | (Italy) No. 52 AF Corse |
| 4 | (Italy) Misano | (Italy) Mario Cordoni | (Italy) Mario Cordoni | (Italy) Mario Cordoni |

== Championship standings ==
Scoring system

Championship points were awarded for the first six positions in each Qualifying Race and for the first ten positions in each Championship Race. Entries were required to complete 75% of the winning driver's race distance in order to be classified and earn points.

Qualifying Race points

| Position | **1st** | **2nd** | **3rd** | **4th** | **5th** | **6th** |
| Points | 8 | 6 | 4 | 3 | 2 | 1 |

Championship Race points

| Position | **1st** | **2nd** | **3rd** | **4th** | **5th** | **6th** | **7th** | **8th** | **9th** | **10th** |
| Points | 25 | 18 | 15 | 12 | 10 | 8 | 6 | 4 | 2 | 1 |

=== Drivers' Championships ===
==== Overall ====
| Pos. | Driver | Team | CAT (Spain) | | LEC (France) | | ALG (Portugal) | | MIS (Italy) | | Total |
| Pos. | Driver | Team | QR | CR | QR | CR | QR | CR | QR | CR | Total |
|---|---|---|---|---|---|---|---|---|---|---|---|
| 1 | (Italy) Max Bianchi | (Switzerland) Kessel Racing | 3 | 1 | 12 | 4 | 3 | 2 | 2 | 2 | 87 |
| 2 | (France) Cédric Mezard | (Italy) Scuderia Villorba Corse | 6 | 2 | 2 | 2 | 4 | 3 | 4 | 3 | 79 |
| 3 | (Italy) Mario Cordoni | (Italy) AF Corse | 2 | 12 | Ret | 8 | **1** | 1 | **1** | 1 | 76 |
| 4 | (Monaco) Martin Lanting | (Italy) AF Corse | 4 | 11 | 4 | 3 | 2 | 4 | 8 | 6 | 47 |
| 5 | (Italy) Stefano Pezzucchi | (Italy) Krypton Motorsport | **1** | Ret | **1** | 1 | | | | | 41 |
| 6 | (Belgium) Patrick Van Glabeke | (Italy) AF Corse | 5 | 3 | 6 | 9 | 8 | 7 | 3 | 8 | 34 |
| 7 | (Belgium) Jean-Michel Baert | (Belgium) WRT Racing | 12 | 6 | 9 | Ret | 6 | 6 | 6 | 4 | 30 |
| 8 | (Belgium) Louis-Philippe Soenen | (Italy) AF Corse | 10 | 8 | 13 | 13 | 10 | 8 | 5 | 5 | 20 |
| 9 | (Belgium) Thierry Verstraete | (Belgium) NSC Motorsports | 8 | 4 | 14 | 18 | 7 | 9 | | | 14 |
| 10 | (France) Maurice Ricci | (France) AKKA ASP | | | 5 | 5 | | | | | 12 |
| 10 | (United States) Stephen Earle | (Switzerland) Kessel Racing | | | | | 5 | 5 | | | 12 |
| 11 | (South Africa) Naomi Schiff | (Germany) Reiter Engineering | 7 | 5 | | | | | | | 10 |
| 11 | (France) Roland Bervillé | (France) Pro GT by Almeras | | | 3 | 7 | | | | | 10 |
| 12 | (Germany) Jürgen Häring | (Germany) Attempto Racing | | | 7 | 6 | | | | | 8 |
| 13 | (United States) Michael Luzich | (Italy) AF Corse | 9 | 7 | 18 | 19 | 9 | 11 | 11 | 10 | 7 |
| 14 | (United Kingdom) Phil Burgan | (United Kingdom) United Autosports | | | | | | | 9 | 7 | 6 |
| 15 | (Netherlands) Wim de Pundert | (Germany) HTP Motorsport | | | 16 | 17 | Ret | 12 | 10 | 9 | 2 |
| 15 | (France) Stéphane Ratel | (France) SRO Race Centre | 11 | 9 | 17 | 20 | | | | | 2 |
| 16 | (Russia) Natalia Freidina | (Germany) Attempto Racing | | | 19 | 15 | | | | | 1 |
| 16 | (Russia) Natalia Freidina | (Portugal) Sports & You | | | | | Ret | 10 | | | 1 |
| 16 | (Hong Kong) Wong Chong Yau Runme | (Switzerland) Kessel Racing | 13 | 10 | | | | | | | 1 |
| 16 | (France) Jean-Luc Beaubelique | (France) AKKA ASP | | | | 10 | | | | | 1 |
| | (Netherlands) Nico Pronk | (Netherlands) Kox Racing | | | 21 | 11 | | | | | 0 |
| | (France) Claude-Yves Gosselin | (France) TDS Racing | | | 8 | 12 | | | | | 0 |
| | (France) Marc Sourd | (France) Saintéloc Racing | | | 10 | 14 | | | | | 0 |
| | (France) Michel Mhitarian | (France) SRO Race Centre | | | 15 | 16 | | | | | 0 |
| | (France) Michael Blanchemain | (France) Saintéloc Racing | | | 20 | Ret | | | | | 0 |
| | (Switzerland) Christoph Ulrich | (Italy) AF Corse | | | | | | | 7 | Ret | 0 |
| | (France) Gabriel Balthazard | (France) AKKA ASP | | | 11 | | | | | | 0 |

Key
| Colour | Result |
|---|---|
| Gold | Race winner |
| Silver | 2nd place |
| Bronze | 3rd place |
| Green | Points finish |
| Blue | Non-points finish |
| Blue | Non-classified finish (NC) |
| Purple | Did not finish (Ret) |
| Black | Disqualified (DSQ) |
| Black | Excluded (EX) |
| White | Did not start (DNS) |
| White | Race cancelled (C) |
| White | Withdrew (WD) |
| Blank | Did not participate |

**Bold** – Pole
Italics – Fastest Lap

==== Iron Cup ====
| Pos. | Driver | Team | CAT (Spain) | | LEC (France) | | ALG (Portugal) | | MIS (Italy) | | Total |
| Pos. | Driver | Team | QR | CR | QR | CR | QR | CR | QR | CR | Total |
|---|---|---|---|---|---|---|---|---|---|---|---|
| 1 | (Monaco) Martin Lanting | (Italy) AF Corse | **4** | 11 | **4** | 3 | **2** | 4 | **8** | 6 | 113 |
| 2 | (Belgium) Louis-Philippe Soenen | (Italy) AF Corse | 10 | 8 | 13 | 13 | 10 | 8 | 5 | 5 | 96 |
| 3 | (United States) Michael Luzich | (Italy) AF Corse | 9 | 7 | 18 | 19 | 9 | 11 | 11 | 10 | 74 |
| 4 | (United States) Stephen Earle | (Switzerland) Kessel Racing | | | | | 5 | 5 | | | 24 |
| 5 | (France) Marc Sourd | (France) Saintéloc Racing | | | 10 | 14 | | | | | 21 |
| 6 | (United Kingdom) Phil Burgan | (United Kingdom) United Autosports | | | | | | | 9 | 7 | 19 |
| 7 | (France) Gabriel Balthazard | (France) AKKA ASP | | | 11 | | | | | | 4 |

==== Cup Challenge ====
| Pos. | Driver | Team | CAT (Spain) | | LEC (France) | | ALG (Portugal) | | MIS (Italy) | | Total |
| Pos. | Driver | Team | QR | CR | QR | CR | QR | CR | QR | CR | Total |
|---|---|---|---|---|---|---|---|---|---|---|---|
| 1 | (Hong Kong) Wong Chong Yau Runme | (Switzerland) Kessel Racing | **13** | 10 | | | | | | | 33 |

== See also ==
- 2015 Blancpain GT Series
