= 2001 Porsche Supercup =

9th Porsche Supercup season

Seasons
- ← 2000 2002 →

The 2001 Porsche Supercup season was the 9th Porsche Supercup season. The races were all supporting races in the 2001 Formula One season. It travelled to 10 circuits across Europe and a double-header at Indianapolis, USA. The 2001 season was the final season that cars ran on Pirelli tyres

== Teams and drivers ==
All teams used the Porsche 911 GT3 Cup (996) and ran on Pirelli tyres.

Team	No.	Drivers	Rounds
(Germany) Porsche AG	1	(Italy) Guido Schittone	1
(Germany) Porsche AG	1	(Spain) Balba González-Camino	2
(Germany) Porsche AG	1	(Austria) Hans Knauss	3
(Germany) Porsche AG	1	(France) Jonathan Cochet	4
(Germany) Porsche AG	1	(Germany) Ralf Waldmann	5
(Germany) Porsche AG	1	(United Kingdom) Kelvin Burt	6
(Germany) Porsche AG	1	(United Kingdom) Marino Franchitti	7
(Germany) Porsche AG	1	(Hungary) Zoltan Zengö	8
(Germany) Porsche AG	1	(Belgium) Vanina Ickx	9
(Germany) Porsche AG	1	(Italy) Prisca Taruffi	10
(Germany) Porsche AG	1	(United States) Sam Hornish Jr.	11
(Germany) Porsche AG	2	(Italy) Alex Caffi	1
(Germany) Porsche AG	2	(Germany) Ralf Waldmann	2
(Germany) Porsche AG	2	(Austria) Harry Raithofer	3
(Germany) Porsche AG	2	(France) Jean-Pierre Richelmi	4
(Germany) Porsche AG	2	(Austria) Peter Oberndorfer	5
(Germany) Porsche AG	2	(United Kingdom) Shane Lynch	6
(Germany) Porsche AG	2	(Germany) Tobias Moretti	7
(Germany) Porsche AG	2	(Germany) Achim Peitzmeier	8
(Germany) Porsche AG	2	(Japan) Akihiko Nakaya	9
(Germany) Porsche AG	2	(Italy) Fabio Babini	10
(Germany) Porsche AG	2	(United States) David Donohue	11
(Germany) Porsche AG	28	(Germany) Timo Bernhard	5–7, 10
(Germany) Porsche AG	29	(Germany) Marc Lieb	5–7, 10
(Germany) Kadach Racing Team	3	(Italy) Alessandro Zampedri	All
(Germany) Kadach Racing Team	10	(Germany) Oliver Mathai	4–10
(Germany) Kadach Racing Team	10	(Canada) Jeff Pabst	11
(Germany) Kadach Racing Team	14	(United States) George Frazier	3–4, 11
(Germany) Kadach Racing Team	14	(United States) Paul Jenkins	2
(Germany) Kadach Racing Team	14	(Germany) Richy Müller	5
(Germany) Kadach Racing Team	14	(Belgium) Erik Groes	9
(Germany) Kadach Racing Team	15	(France) Stéphane Ortelli	All
(Germany) Kadach Racing Team	16	(Hungary) Siniso Koustic	1–8
(Germany) Kadach Racing Team	16	(France) Cyrille Sauvage	10
(Germany) Kadach Racing Team	16	(Belgium) Nicolas Kropp	11
(Germany) Kadach Racing Team	17	(France) Michel Neugarten	1–2, 4–10
(Germany) Kadach Racing Team	17	(Italy) Paolo Rapetti	3
(Germany) Farnbacher Racing	4	(Germany) Marco Werner	All
(Germany) Farnbacher Racing	5	(Germany) Jörg Bergmeister	All
(Germany) Farnbacher Racing	6	(Austria) Philipp Peter	All
(Germany) Farnbacher Racing	xx	(Germany) Marc Gindorf	7
(United Kingdom) Martin Flitton Racing	7	(United Kingdom) Jamie Hunter	1–5
(United Kingdom) Martin Flitton Racing	7	(Netherlands) Jacky van der Ende	6–10
(United Kingdom) Martin Flitton Racing	8	(Denmark) Jesper Carlsen	1–10
(Germany) Manthey Racing	9	(Germany) Wolf Henzler	1–3
(Germany) Manthey Racing	10	(Germany) Oliver Mathai	1–3
(Germany) Jürgen Alzen Motorsport	11	(Portugal) Pedro Couceiro	1–9
(Germany) Jürgen Alzen Motorsport	11	(Germany) Richard Römer	10
(Germany) Jürgen Alzen Motorsport	11	(Germany) Frank Schmickler	11
(Germany) Jürgen Alzen Motorsport	20	(Netherlands) Duncan Huisman	6–7
(Germany) Jürgen Alzen Motorsport	20	(Austria) Alexander Witting	2
(Germany) Jürgen Alzen Motorsport	20	(Netherlands) Roeland Voermann	4
(Germany) Jürgen Alzen Motorsport	20	(United States) Terry Linger	11
(Germany) Jürgen Alzen Motorsport	21	(Germany) Ralf Kelleners	1–4
(Germany) Jürgen Alzen Motorsport	21	(Germany) Wolf Henzler	5–11
(Austria) MAT Racing Team	12	(Germany) Tim Bergmeister	All
(Austria) MAT Racing Team	13	(Germany) Nicole Lüttecke	2, 5, 8–10
(Austria) MAT Racing Team	13	(Austria) Alexander Witting	1
(Austria) MAT Racing Team	13	(Austria) Richard Lietz	3
(Austria) MAT Racing Team	13	(United Kingdom) Ian Khan	4
(Germany) Carsport Racing	18	(Germany) Lucas Luhr	2–3, 5, 7
(Germany) Carsport Racing	18	(Switzerland) Bruno Eichmann	4, 7–10
(Germany) Carsport Racing	18	(Germany) Marc Lieb	11
(Germany) Carsport Racing	19	(Germany) Roland Asch	1, 5
(Germany) Carsport Racing	19	(Germany) Thomas Braumüller	2, 8
(Germany) Carsport Racing	19	(United States) Gunnar Jeannette	9, 11
(Germany) Carsport Racing	19	(Germany) Wolf Henzler	4
(Germany) Carsport Racing	19	(Switzerland) Bruno Staub	10
(United Kingdom) Carlin Motorsport	22	(Germany) Sascha Maassen	2–7, 9–11
(United Kingdom) Carlin Motorsport	22	(Italy) Giovanni Anapoli	1
(United Kingdom) Carlin Motorsport	22	(Australia) Alex Davison	8
(United Kingdom) Carlin Motorsport	23	(Belgium) Vincent Radermecker	1–3, 5–10
(United Kingdom) Carlin Motorsport	23	(Italy) Giovanni Anapoli	4, 11
(Germany) Herberth Motorsport	24	(Germany) Nicole Lüttecke	7
(Germany) Herberth Motorsport	25	(Germany) Frank Stippler	7
(Germany) Herberth Motorsport	26	(Germany) Dominik Neumeyr	7
(Germany) Team Phoenix	24	(Australia) Alex Davison	5
(Germany) Team Phoenix	25	(Germany) Christian Menzel	5
(France) Larbre Compétition	24	(France) Jack Leconte	4
(France) Larbre Compétition	25	(France) Roland Bervillé	4
(Hungary) Bovi Motorsport	24	(Hungary) Ferenc Ratkai	8
(Hungary) Bovi Motorsport	25	(Hungary) Istvan Racz	8
(United Kingdom) Team Eurotech	30	(United Kingdom) Pete Chambers	6
(United Kingdom) Team Eurotech	31	(United Kingdom) Adrian Slater	6
(United Kingdom) Redline Racing	32	(United Kingdom) Nigel Rice	6
(United Kingdom) Redline Racing	33	(United Kingdom) Mike Salmon	6

== Race calendar and results ==
Round		Circuit	Country	Date	Pole position	Winning driver	Winning team
1	R	(Italy) Autodromo Enzo e Dino Ferrari	Italy	15 April	(Germany) Jörg Bergmeister	(Germany) Jörg Bergmeister	(Germany) Farnbacher Racing
2	R	(Spain) Circuit de Catalunya	Spain	29 April	(Germany) Jörg Bergmeister	(Germany) Jörg Bergmeister	(Germany) Farnbacher Racing
3	R	(Austria) A1 Ring	Austria	13 May	(Germany) Jörg Bergmeister	(Germany) Marco Werner	(Germany) Farnbacher Racing
4	R	Circuit de Monaco	Monaco	27 May	(France) Stéphane Ortelli	(France) Stéphane Ortelli	(Germany) Kadach Racing Team
5	R	(Germany) Nürburgring	Germany	24 June	(Germany) Jörg Bergmeister	(Germany) Jörg Bergmeister	(Germany) Farnbacher Racing
6	R	(United Kingdom) Silverstone Circuit	United Kingdom	15 July	(Germany) Jörg Bergmeister	(Germany) Jörg Bergmeister	(Germany) Farnbacher Racing
7	R	(Germany) Hockenheimring	Germany	29 July	(France) Stéphane Ortelli	(Germany) Timo Bernhard	(Germany) Porsche AG
8	R	(Hungary) Hungaroring	Hungary	19 August	(Germany) Jörg Bergmeister	(Germany) Jörg Bergmeister	(Germany) Farnbacher Racing
9	R	(Belgium) Circuit de Spa-Francorchamps	Belgium	2 September	(Germany) Marco Werner	(Germany) Marco Werner	(Germany) Farnbacher Racing
10	R	(Italy) Autodromo Nazionale Monza	Italy	16 September	(Germany) Jörg Bergmeister	(Germany) Jörg Bergmeister	(Germany) Farnbacher Racing
11	R1	(United States) Indianapolis Motor Speedway	United States	29 September	(Germany) Jörg Bergmeister	(Germany) Sascha Maassen	(United Kingdom) Carlin Motorsport
11	R2	(United States) Indianapolis Motor Speedway	United States	30 September	(Germany) Sascha Maassen	(Germany) Jörg Bergmeister	(Germany) Farnbacher Racing

== Championship standings ==
Position	**1st**	**2nd**	**3rd**	**4th**	**5th**	**6th**	**7th**	**8th**	**9th**	**10th**	**11th**	**12th**	**13th**	**14th**	**15th**
Points	20	18	16	14	12	10	9	8	7	6	5	4	3	2	1

Pos	Driver	IMO (Italy)	CAT (Spain)	A1R (Austria)	MON (Monaco)	NÜR (Germany)	SIL (United Kingdom)	HOC (Germany)	HUN (Hungary)	SPA (Belgium)	MNZ (Italy)	IND (United States)		Points
1	(Germany) Jörg Bergmeister	**1**	**1**	**18**	Ret	**1**	**1**	3	**1**	2	**1**	**2**	1	195
2	(Germany) Marco Werner	2	7	1	3	6	Ret	4	10	**1**	8	Ret	6	142
3	(France) Stéphane Ortelli	3	Ret	2	**1**	10	Ret	**2**	Ret	4	5	6	3	139
4	(Germany) Tim Bergmeister	10	Ret	11	7	4	5	5	2	10	7	7	5	126
5	(Germany) Sascha Maassen		3	10	12	14	6	7		6	3	1	**2**	125
6	(Germany) Wolf Henzler	5	6	7	2	7	2	6	8	8	6	Ret	Ret	123
7	(Austria) Philipp Peter	9	5	6	Ret	Ret	7	8	4	3	4	3	7	122
8	(Italy) Alessandro Zampedri	11	Ret	3	16	8	9	14	3	7	Ret	5	4	106
9	(Portugal) Pedro Couceiro	8	Ret	4	Ret	9	8	11	11	12				61
10	(Hungary) Siniso Koustic	13	11	8	5	13	15	10	14					56
11	(Germany) Oliver Mathai	6	9	9	Ret	Ret	11	Ret	18	5	12			55
12	(France) Michel Neugarten	17	Ret		4	12	Ret	12	9	9	9			54
13	(Belgium) Vincent Radermecker	Ret	8	14		17	16	13	Ret	11	14			34
14	(Netherlands) Jacky van der Ende						14	16	7	13	10			31
15	(United Kingdom) Jamie Hunter	12	12	Ret	9	15								24
16	(Denmark) Jesper Carlsen	14	Ret	15	DNS	Ret	12	Ret	Ret	Ret	15			16
guest drivers ineligible for championship points
	(Germany) Timo Bernhard					2	3	1			2			0
	(Germany) Lucas Luhr		2	5		Ret		Ret						0
	(Germany) Marc Lieb					3	4	Ret			Ret	4	Ret	0
	(Germany) Ralf Kelleners	4	4	13	Ret									0
	(Australia) Alex Davison					5			5					0
	(France) Jonathan Cochet				6									0
	(Germany) Thomas Braumüller		DNS						6					0
	(Germany) Roland Asch	7				16								0
	(United States) David Donohue											8	8	0
	(Italy) Giovanni Anapoli	16			8							Ret	9	0
	(Germany) Frank Stippler							9						0
	(United States) Gunnar Jeannette									16		9	Ret	0
	(Germany) Ralf Waldmann		10			11								0
	(United States) George Frazier			Ret	10							11	Ret	
	(United Kingdom) Kelvin Burt						10							0
	(Belgium) Nicolas Kropp											10	13	0
	(United States) Sam Hornish Jr.											Ret	10	0
	(United States) Terry Linger											12	11	0
	(Switzerland) Bruno Staub										11			0
	(Netherlands) Roeland Voermann				11									0
	(Austria) Richard Lietz			12										0
	(Switzerland) Bruno Eichmann				Ret			Ret	12	DNS	Ret			0
	(Canada) Jeff Pabst											Ret	12	0
	(United Kingdom) Ian Khan				13									0
	(Netherlands) Duncan Huisman						13	15						0
	(Hungary) Istvan Racz								13					0
	(France) Cyrille Sauvage										13			0
	(Spain) Balba González-Camino		13											0
	(Belgium) Erik Groes									14				0
	(France) Jack Leconte				14									0
	(Japan) Akihiko Nakaya									15				0
	(France) Roland Bervillé				15									0
	(Germany) Nicole Lüttecke		Ret			19		20	15	18	Ret			0
	(Italy) Alex Caffi	15												0
	(Austria) Harry Raithofer			16										0
	(Hungary) Ferenc Ratkai								16					0
	(Germany) Richard Römer										16			0
	(Austria) Hans Knauss			17										0
	(United Kingdom) Adrian Slater						17							0
	(United Kingdom) Marino Franchitti							17						0
	(Hungary) Zoltan Zengö							17						0
	(Belgium) Vanina Ickx									17				0
	(Italy) Prisca Taruffi										17			0
	(Austria) Alexander Witting	18	Ret											0
	(Austria) Peter Oberndorfer					18								0
	(United Kingdom) Pete Chambers						18							0
	(Germany) Marc Gindorf							18						0
	(Italy) Guido Schittone	19												0
	(Italy) Paolo Rapetti			19										0
	(United Kingdom) Nigel Rice						19							0
	(Germany) Dominik Neumeyr							19						0
	(Germany) Achim Peitzmeier							19						0
	(United Kingdom) Mike Salmon						20							0
	(Germany) Tobias Moretti							21						0
	(United States) Paul Jenkins		Ret											0
	(France) Jean-Pierre Richelmi				Ret									0
	(Germany) Richy Müller					Ret								0
	(Germany) Christian Menzel					Ret								0
	(United Kingdom) Shane Lynch						Ret							0
	(Italy) Fabio Babini										Ret			0
	(Germany) Frank Schmickler											Ret	Ret	0
Pos	Driver	IMO (Italy)	CAT (Spain)	A1R (Austria)	MON (Monaco)	NÜR (Germany)	SIL (United Kingdom)	HOC (Germany)	HUN (Hungary)	SPA (Belgium)	MNZ (Italy)	IND (United States)		Points

Colour	Result
Gold	Winner
Silver	Second place
Bronze	Third place
Green	Points classification
Blue	Non-points classification
Blue	Non-classified finish (NC)
Purple	Retired, not classified (Ret)
Red	Did not qualify (DNQ)
Red	Did not pre-qualify (DNPQ)
Black	Disqualified (DSQ)
White	Did not start (DNS)
White	Withdrew (WD)
White	Race cancelled (C)
Blank	Did not practice (DNP)
Blank	Did not arrive (DNA)
Blank	Excluded (EX)

**Bold** – Pole

== Bibliography ==
- Upietz, Ulrich (2001). Porsche Sport 2001 (in German and English). Duisburg: Gruppe C Motorsport Verlag. ISBN 978-3-928540-30-8.
