= Patrick Bourdais =

French racing driver

Patrick Bourdais (born 16 September 1954) is a retired French racing driver. He is the father of Sébastien Bourdais, who competed in many categories, including Formula One.

== Racing record ==
=== Complete 24 Hours of Le Mans results ===
Year	Team	Co-Drivers	Car	Class	Laps	Pos.	Class Pos.
1993	(France) Roland Bassaler	(France) Roland Bassaler (France) Jean-Louis Capette	Sauber SHS C6-BMW	C2	166	DNF	DNF
1994	(France) Roland Bassaler	(France) Nicolas Minassian (France) Olivier Couvreur	Alpa LM-Ford Cosworth	LMP1; C90	64	DNF	DNF
1995	(United Kingdom) Agusta Racing Team	(Denmark) Thorkild Thyrring (Italy) Almo Coppelli	Callaway Corvette Supernatural	GT2	96	DNF	DNF
1996	(France) Larbre Compétition	(France) Patrice Goueslard (Germany) André Ahrlé	Porsche 911 GT2	GT2	284	20th	6th
1997	(France) Larbre Compétition	(United States) Peter Kitchak (Brazil) André Lara-Rezende	Porsche 911 GT2	GT2	205	DNF	DNF
2003	(Germany) T2M Motorsport	(Belgium) Vanina Ickx (France) Roland Bervillé	Porsche 911 GT3-RS	GT	264	27th	9th
2004	(United States) Panoz Motor Sports (France) Larbre Compétition	(France) Jean-Luc Blanchemain (France) Roland Bervillé	Panoz GTP	LMP1	54	DNF	DNF
2005	(United States) Panoz Motor Sports	(United States) Bryan Sellers (United Kingdom) Marino Franchitti	Panoz Esperante GT-LM	GT2	185	DNF	DNF
2006	(France) Noël del Bello Racing	(United Kingdom) Adam Sharpe (Belgium) Tom Cloet	Porsche 911 GT3-RSR	GT2	115	DNF	DNF
