= Roland Bervillé =

French businessman and racing driver (born 1966)

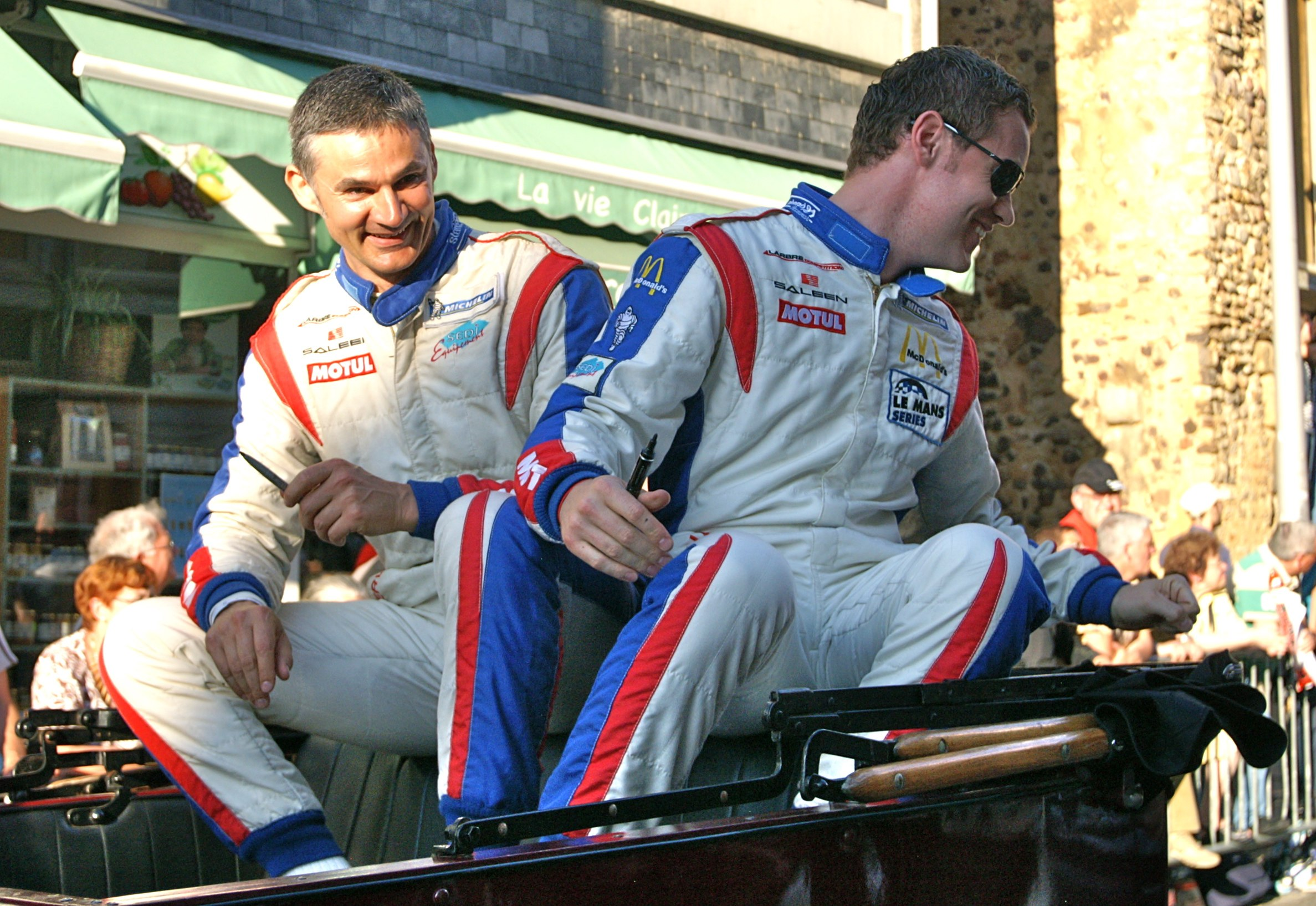
- Bervillé (left) in 2010
- Nationality: (France) French
- Born: 2 July 1966 (age 60) Uzès, France
- Categorisation: FIA Bronze

Championship titles
- 2017: Porsche Supercup – B

Roland Philippe Bervillé (born 2 February 1966) is a French businessman and racing driver who last competed in Porsche Supercup for Martinet by Alméras. He won the 2010 24 Hours of Le Mans in the LMGT1 class, driving a Saleen S7-R for Larbre Compétition.

== Business ventures ==
Alongside his racing career, Bervillé has been working as a business executive for Sedi Group since 1993.

== Career ==
Bervillé began his car racing career in 1996, competing at the BPR 4 Hours of Nogaro for Jacques Alméras in GT2. Following that, Bervillé primarily raced for Alméras' Porsche-affiliated outfit in the French GT Championship until 1999, before switching to Larbre Compétition in 2000, a year in which he also raced at the 24 Hours of Daytona for Brumos Racing in the GTU class.

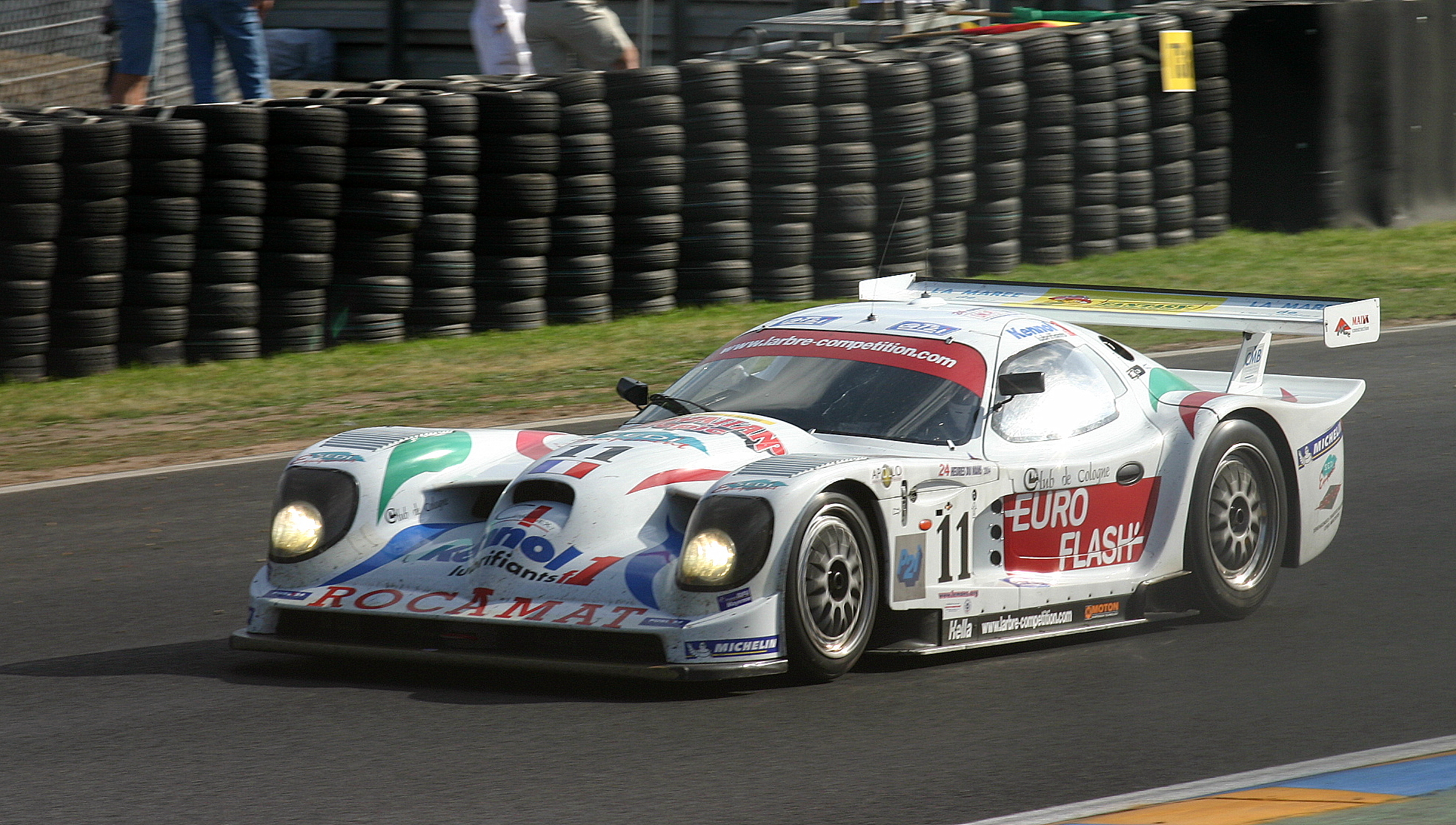
Bervillé made one LMP1 start at the 24 Hours of Le Mans, in a Panoz GTP in 2004.

While continuing to mainly enter national series across the next three seasons, notably winning twice in FFSA GT in 2001 with Christophe Bouchut, Bervillé made his debut at the 24 Hours of Le Mans for T2M Motorsport in 2003, and the 12 Hours of Sebring for Larbre at the start of 2004. Later in the year, Bervillé returned to the 24 Hours of Le Mans in a Larbre-run factory Panoz GTP in LMP1, as well as winning the Bahrain GT Festival in the GT3 class. Bervillé then remained with Larbre as he made select appearances throughout the 2005 FIA GT and 2006 FIA GT3 European Championships. In 2007, Bervillé returned to the 24 Hours of Le Mans in GT1, driving an Aston Martin DBR9 for Aston Martin Racing Larbre, before winning the Mil Milhas Brasil in the same class towards the end of the year.

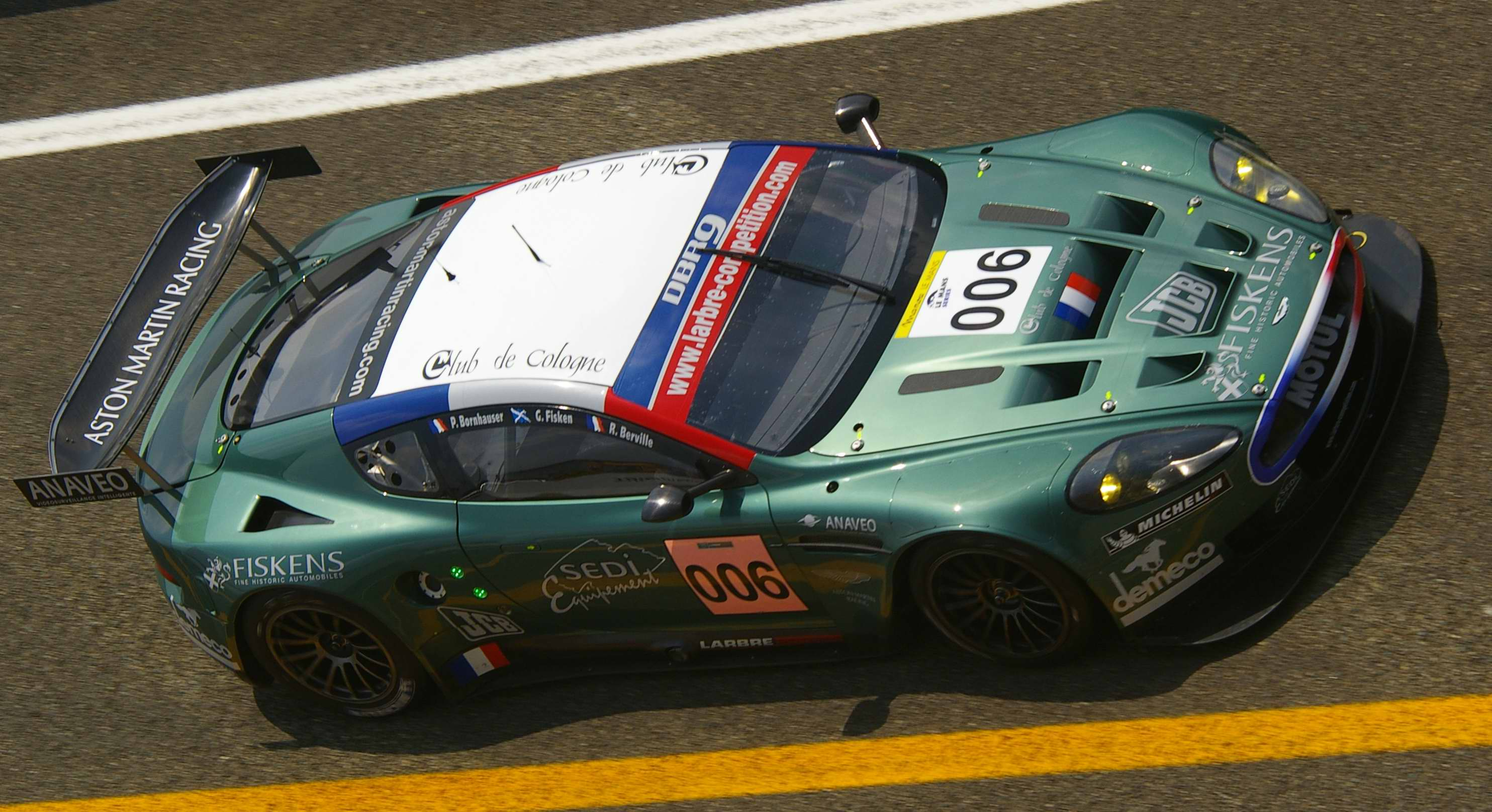
Bervillé's Larbre-run works Aston Martin DBR9 at the 2007 24 Hours of Le Mans.

In 2008, Bervillé competed in the first two races of the Le Mans Series for Corvette-fielding Luc Alphand Aventures, taking a lone GT1 podium at Monza, before reuniting with Larbre to share a Saleen S7-R with Frédéric Makowiecki in the FIA GT Championship at San Luis later that year. Continuing with Saleen-fielding Larbre for the 2009 Le Mans Series season, Bervillé took a lone GT1 win at the Nürburgring and three other podiums en route to runner-up honours in points. During 2009, Bervillé also raced with the team at the 1000 km of Okayama, finishing third in GT1 in race two. The following year, Bervillé mainly raced in Porsche Carrera Cup France for Pro GT by Alméras, but found major success with Larbre at the 24 Hours of Le Mans, winning the LMGT1 class alongside Julien Canal and Gabriele Gardel. Two seasons in Porsche Carrera Cup France for Alméras then ensued, during which Bervillé also contested the majority of the 2012 Blancpain Endurance Series in Pro-Am for the same team.

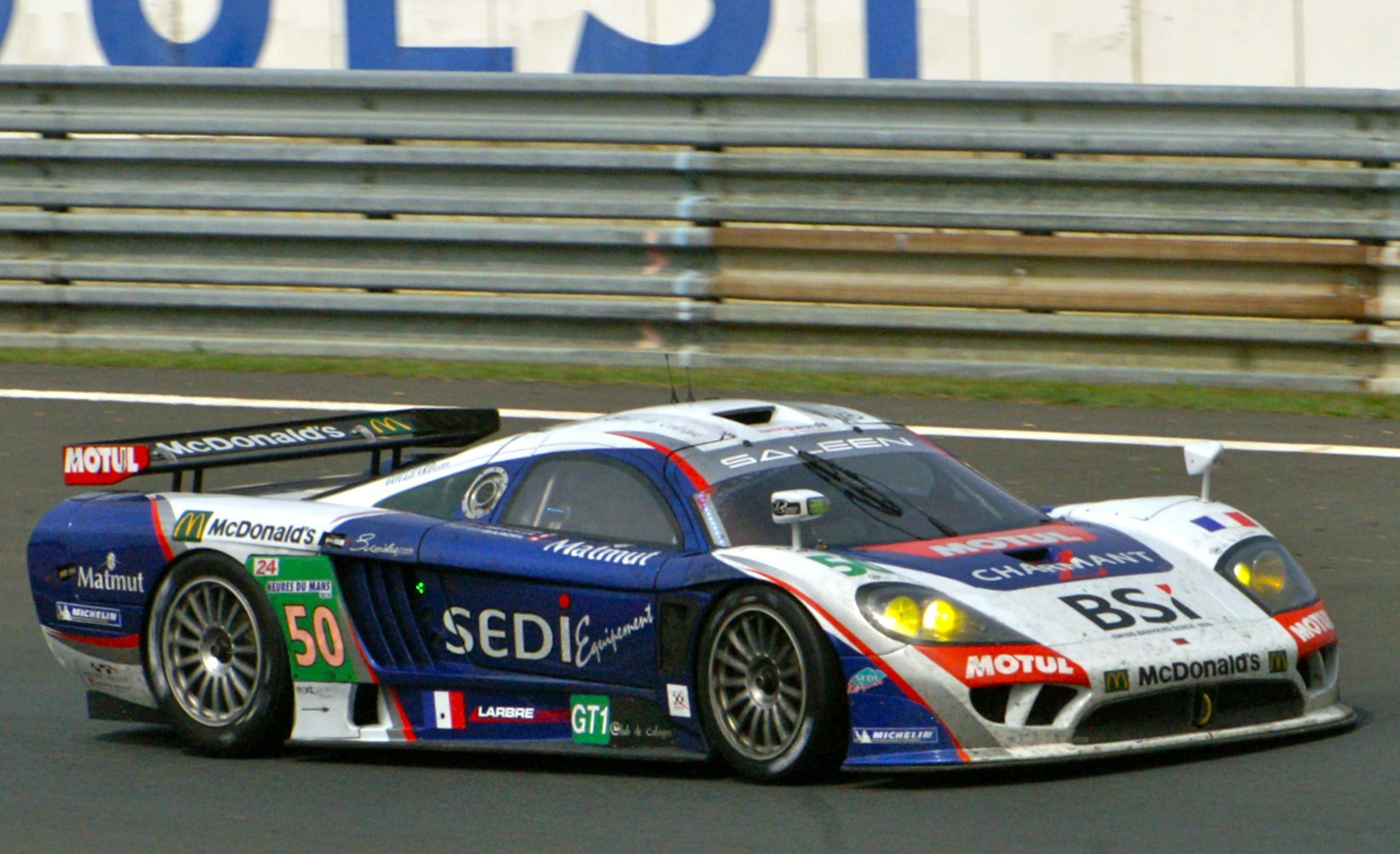
Bervillé won the 2010 24 Hours of Le Mans in LMGT1 at the wheel of a Larbre Compétition Saleen S7-R.

Following a part-time season in V de V–run series in 2013, Bervillé joined Sébastien Loeb Racing to compete in the FFSA GT Championship the following year alongside Anthony Beltoise. Driving an Audi R8 LMS ultra on his full-time return to the series, Bervillé took a lone win at Lédenon and a pair of third-place finishes at Nogaro to take tenth in points. In 2015, Bervillé raced part-time in the series for Duqueine Team, before returning to Alméras to make a one-off appearance in the GT Sports Club. After that, Bervillé only competed in Porsche one-make series until 2021 for Alméras-ran outfits, most notably taking the Porsche Supercup B-class title in 2017 without a class win to his name.

== Racing record ==
=== Racing career summary ===
Season	Series	Team	Races	Wins	Poles	F/Laps	Podiums	Points	Position
1996	BPR Global GT Series – GT2	Jacques Alméras	1	0	0	0	0		
1997	French GT Championship	Equipe Alméras Frères	2	0	0	0	0		
1998	French GT Championship	Equipe Alméras Frères	10	0	0	0	1	93	11th
1999	French GT Championship	Equipe Alméras Frères	11	0	1	1	3	175	14th
1999	FFSA Supertourisme France	Equipe Alméras Frères	2	0	0	0	0	9	26th
2000	Grand American Road Racing Championship – GTU	Brumos Racing	1	0	0	0	0		
2000	French GT Championship	Larbre Compétition	13	0	0	0	0	247	6th
2000	Porsche Carrera Cup France								10th
2000	American Le Mans Series – GT	Noël del Bello Racing	1	0	0	0	0	13	80th
2000	FFSA Supertourisme France	Equipe Alméras Frères	2	0	0	0	1	7	24th
2001	French GT Championship – GT Cup	Larbre Compétition	11	2	1	1	4	236	6th
2001	Porsche Supercup	Larbre Compétition	1	0	0	0	0	0	NC†
2002	Spanish GT Championship – GTB	Equipe Alméras Frères	1	0	0	0	0		
2003	Porsche Carrera Cup France	Larbre Compétition	13	0	0	0	0	4	14th
2003	French GT Championship		1	0	0	0	1		
2003	24 Hours of Le Mans – GT	T2M Motorsport	1	0	0	0	0	—N/a	9th
2004	Porsche Carrera Cup France	Larbre Compétition	8	0	0	0	0	5	16th
2004	American Le Mans Series – LMP1	Larbre Compétition	1	0	0	0	0	10	14th
2004	24 Hours of Le Mans – LMP1	Panoz Motor Sports / Larbre Compétition	1	0	0	0	0	—N/a	DNF
2004	Bahrain GT Festival – GT3	Larbre Compétition	1	1	0	0	1	—N/a	**1st**
2005	Porsche Carrera Cup France	Larbre Compétition	14	0	0	0	0	11	10th
2005	FIA GT Championship – GT1	Graham Nash Motorsport	1	0	0	0	0	11	10th
2005	FIA GT Championship – GT1	Larbre Compétition	1	0	0	0	0	11	10th
2005	French GT Championship	Larbre Compétition	2	0	0	0	0	2	38th
2006	Porsche Carrera Cup France	Larbre Compétition	14	0	0	0	0	1	22nd
2006	FIA GT3 European Championship	Larbre Compétition	6	0	0	0	0	0	NC
2006	French GT Championship	CD Sport	2	0	0	0	0	46	18th
2006	French GT Championship	Euroflash Autovitesse	2	0	0	0	0	46	18th
2006	French GT Championship	SRT	2	0	0	0	2	46	18th
2007	Porsche Carrera Cup France	Larbre Compétition	12	0	0	0	0	0	NC
2007	24 Hours of Le Mans – GT1	Aston Martin Racing Larbre	1	0	0	0	0	—N/a	13th
2007	French GT Championship	PSI Experiences	2	0	0	0	0	18	22nd
2007	French GT Championship	SRT	2	0	0	0	1	18	22nd
2007	Le Mans Series – GT1	Aston Martin Racing Larbre	1	1	0	0	1	5	15th
2008	Le Mans Series – GT1	Luc Alphand Aventures	2	0	0	0	1	6	7th
2008	French GT Championship	Larbre Compétition	2	0	0	0	0		
2008	GT90's Revival Series	Solution F	2	2	0	0	2	20	6th
2008	FIA GT Championship – GT1	Larbre Compétition	1	0	0	0	0	0	NC
2009	Le Mans Series – GT1	Larbre Compétition	4	1	0	0	4	34	**2nd**
2009	French GT Championship	Larbre Compétition	2	0	0	0	1		
2009	Asian Le Mans Series – GT1	Larbre Compétition	2	0	0	0	1	14	**3rd**
2009–10	Sportscar Winter Series – Proto	DAMS	4	0	0	0	1		
2010	Porsche Carrera Cup France	Pro GT by Alméras	7	0	0	0	0	11	13th
2010	V de V Challenge Monoplace	GTRO	3	2	0	2	3	112	14th
2010	24 Hours of Le Mans – LMGT1	Larbre Compétition	1	1	0	0	1	—N/a	**1st**
2011	Porsche Carrera Cup France	Pro GT by Alméras	12	0	0	0	0	35	9th
2011	Porsche Carrera World Cup	Pro GT by Alméras	1	0	0	0	0	—N/a	68th
2011	Porsche Supercup	Pro GT by Alméras	2	0	0	0	0	0	NC†
2011	French GT Championship	Sport Garage	2	0	0	0	0		
2011	French GT Championship	WRT	2	0	0	0	0		
2012	Porsche Carrera Cup France	Pro GT by Alméras	11	0	0	0	0	38	16th
2012	Blancpain Endurance Series – Pro-Am	Pro GT by Alméras	4	0	0	0	0	5	15th
2012	French GT Championship	Pro GT by Alméras	4	0	0	0	1	36	15th
2013	V de V Michelin Endurance Series – GT	Porsche Alméras	1	0	0	0	0		
2013	V de V Challenge Monoplace	GTRO	6	0	0	0	0	141	20th
2014	FFSA GT Championship	Sébastien Loeb Racing	14	1	1	0	3	91	10th
2014	Porsche Supercup	Sébastien Loeb Racing	1	0	0	0	0	0	NC†
2014	Blancpain Endurance Series – Pro-Am	Graff Racing	1	0	0	0	0	0	NC
2014	Porsche Carrera Cup France	Team Martinet – Alméras	1	0	0	0	0	0	NC†
2015	FFSA GT Championship	Duqueine Team	4	0	0	0	0	30	25th
2015	GT Sports Club	Pro GT by Alméras	2	0	0	0	1	37	11th
2016	Porsche Supercup	Martinet by Alméras	6	0	0	0	0	0	NC†
2016	Porsche Supercup	Pierre Martinet by Alméras	1	0	0	0	0	0	NC†
2016	Porsche Carrera Cup France	Martinet by Alméras	2	0	0	0	0		
2017	Porsche Supercup	Martinet by Alméras	11	0	0	0	0	0	30th
2017	Porsche Carrera Cup Germany	Martinet by Alméras	2	0	0	0	0	0	NC†
2018	Porsche Supercup	Pierre Martinet by Alméras	3	0	0	0	0	0	NC†
2020	Porsche Supercup	Pierre Martinet by Alméras	3	0	0	0	0	0	24th
2020	Porsche Supercup – Pro-Am	Pierre Martinet by Alméras	3	0	0	0	1	31	6th
2020	Porsche Carrera Cup France – Pro-Am	Pierre Martinet by Alméras	3	0	0	0	0	12	6th
2021	Porsche Supercup	Martinet by Alméras	4	0	0	0	0	0	NC†

^{†} As Bervillé was a guest driver, he was ineligible for points.

=== Complete American Le Mans Series results ===
(key) Races in bold indicates pole position. Races in italics indicates fastest lap.

Year	Team	Class	Make	Engine	1	2	3	4	5	6	7	8	9	10	11	12	Pos.	Points
2000	Noël del Bello Racing	GT	Porsche 996 GT3-R	Porsche M96/77 3.6 L Flat-6	SEB	CHA	SIL	NÜR; 12	SON	MOS	TEX	ROS	PET	MON	LSV	ADE	80th	13
2004	Larbre Compétition	LMP1	Panoz GTP	Élan 6L8 6.0 L V8	SEB; 7	MOH	LIM	SON	POR	MOS	ELK	PET	LGA				14th	10

=== Complete Porsche Supercup results ===
(key) (Races in bold indicate pole position) (Races in italics indicate fastest lap)

Year	Team	1	2	3	4	5	6	7	8	9	10	11	12	DC	Points
2001	Larbre Compétition	IMO	CAT	A1R	MON; 15	NÜR	SIL	HOC	HUN	SPA	MNZ	IND	IND	NC†	0†
2011	Pro GT	IST	CAT; 18	MON; 20	NNS	SIL	HUN	NÜR	SPA	MNZ	YMC	YMC		NC†	0†
2014	Sébastien Loeb Racing	CAT; 19	MON	RBR	SIL	HOC	HUN	SPA	MNZ	COA	COA			NC†	0†
2016	Martinet by Alméras	CAT; 16	MON; Ret			HUN; Ret	HOC	SPA	MNZ; 17	COA; 21	COA; 22			NC†	0†
2016	Pierre Martinet by Alméras			RBR; 22	SIL									NC†	0†
2017	Martinet by Alméras	CAT; 24	CAT; 20	MON; 18	RBR; 28	SIL; 27	HUN; 20	SPA; 28	SPA; 17	MNZ; 24	MEX; 23	MEX; 18		30th	0
2018	Pierre Martinet by Alméras	CAT	MON	RBR	SIL	HOC	HUN	SPA	MNZ; 20	MEX; 23	MEX; Ret			NC†	0†
2020	Pierre Martinet by Alméras	RBR	RBR; 23	HUN	SIL	SIL	CAT; Ret	SPA	MNZ; 23					24th	0
2021	Martinet by Alméras	MON	RBR; 26	RBR	HUN; 28	SPA	ZND	MNZ; 28	MNZ; 31					NC†	0†

^{†} As Bervillé was a guest driver, he was ineligible for points.

=== Complete 24 Hours of Le Mans results ===
Year	Team	Co-Drivers	Car	Class	Laps	Pos.	Class Pos.
2003	(Germany) T2M Motorsport	(Belgium) Vanina Ickx (France) Patrick Bourdais	Porsche 911 GT3-RS	GT	264	27th	9th
2004	(United States) Panoz Motor Sports (France) Larbre Compétition	(France) Jean-Luc Blanchemain (France) Patrick Bourdais	Panoz GTP	LMP1	54	DNF	DNF
2007	(France) Aston Martin Racing Larbre	(France) Patrick Bornhauser (United Kingdom) Gregor Fisken	Aston Martin DBR9	GT1	272	29th	13th
2010	(France) Larbre Compétition	(France) Julien Canal (Switzerland) Gabriele Gardel	Saleen S7-R	GT1	331	13th	1st

=== Complete FIA GT Championship results ===
(key) (Races in bold indicate pole position) (Races in italics indicate fastest lap)

Year	Team	Car	Class	1	2	3	4	5	6	7	8	9	10	11	12	13	Pos.	Pts
2005	Graham Nash Motorsport	Saleen S7-R	GT1	MNZ	MAG; 10	SIL	IMO	BRN	SPA; 6H	SPA; 12H	SPA; 24H	OSC	IST	ZHU	DUB		39th	1
2005	Larbre Compétition	Ferrari 550-GTS Maranello	GT1													BHR; 8	39th	1
2008	Larbre Compétition	Saleen S7-R	GT1	SIL	MNZ	ADR	OSC	SPA; 6H	SPA; 12H	SPA; 24H	BUC; 1	BUC; 2	BRN	NOG	ZOL	SAN; Ret	NC	0

=== Complete FIA GT3 European Championship results ===
Year	Team	Car	Engine	1	2	3	4	5	6	7	8	9	10	Pos.	Points
2006	Larbre Compétition	Porsche 997 GT3 Cup	Porsche M97/76 3.6 L Flat-6	SIL; 1; 20	SIL; 2 Ret	OSC; 1	OSC; 2	SPA; 1	SPA; 2	DIJ; 1; 15	DIJ; 2; 17	MUG; 1; 25	MUG; 2 Ret	NC	0

=== Complete European Le Mans Series results ===
(key) (Races in bold indicate pole position; results in italics indicate fastest lap)

Year	Entrant	Class	Chassis	Engine	1	2	3	4	5	6	Rank	Points
2007	Aston Martin Racing Larbre	GT1	Aston Martin DBR9	Aston Martin AM04 6.0 L V12	MNZ	VAL	NUR	SPA	SIL	MIL; 1	15th	5
2008	Luc Alphand Aventures	GT1	Chevrolet Corvette C6.R	Chevrolet LS7.R 7.0 L V8	CAT; Ret	MNZ; 3	SPA	NUR	SIL		7th	6
2009	Larbre Compétition	GT1	Saleen S7-R	Ford Windsor 7.0 L V8	CAT; 3	SPA	ALG; 2	**NUR**; 1	**SIL**; 2		2nd	34

=== Complete Asian Le Mans Series results ===
(key) (Races in bold indicate pole position) (Races in italics indicate fastest lap)

Year	Team	Class	Car	Engine	1	2	Pos.	Points
2009	Larbre Compétition	GT	Saleen S7-R	Ford Windsor 7.0 L V8	OKA; 1 Ret	OKA; 2; 3	3rd	14

=== Complete GT World Challenge results ===
==== GT World Challenge Europe Endurance Cup ====
(Races in bold indicate pole position) (Races in italics indicate fastest lap)

Year	Team	Car	Class	1	2	3	4	5	6	7	8	Pos.	Points
2012	Pro GT by Alméras	Porsche 997 GT3-R	Pro-Am	MNZ; 13	SIL; 19	LEC; 12	SPA; 6H ?	SPA; 12H ?	SPA; 24H; 21	NÜR; WD	NAV; 20	15th	5
2014	Graff Racing	Porsche 997 GT3-R	Pro-Am	MNZ	SIL	LEC; Ret	SPA; 6H	SPA; 12H	SPA; 24H	NÜR		NC	0
