= Phil Burgan =

British businessman

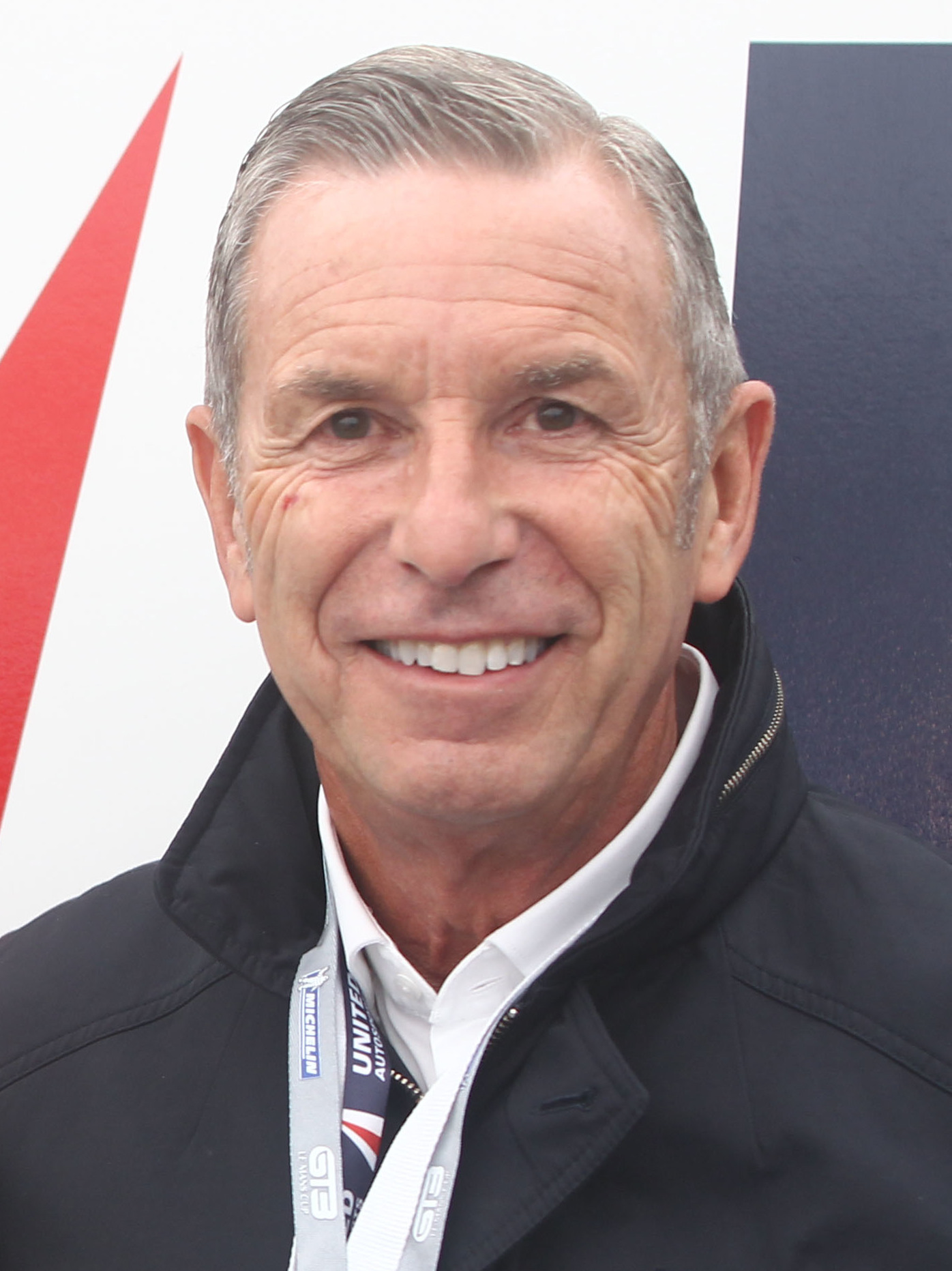
- Burgan at the 2016 24 Hours of Le Mans
- Born: Philip John Burgan; 6 December 1951 (age 74); Sheffield, England
- Education: University of Bradford
- Occupations: Founder and CEO of Maria Mallaband Care Group Ltd
- Years active: 1996–present
- Spouse: Lynne (1979–present)
- Children: James, Rachel, Sarah, Charlotte
- Parent(s): Harry & Lilian
- Website: mmcgcarehomes.co.uk

Phil Burgan (born 6 December 1951) is the founder and CEO of Maria Mallaband Care Group Ltd, a care home company he named after his late grandmother.

== Early life ==
Burgan was born in Sheffield, West Riding of Yorkshire, England to Harry (an engineer) and Lilian (a dress maker). He was educated at Thornbridge Grammar School, leaving with 7 O-levels and 3 A-levels to study pharmacy at the University of Bradford, graduating with a 2:1 in 1973.

== Business career ==
Burgan completed his training to become a pharmacist before becoming a branch manager for a small chain of pharmacies called W. Jamieson Ltd. in 1976. It was here that Burgan developed his management and business skills, gaining experience in accounting, marketing, retailing and finance.

In 1982 he was appointed the managing director of a small company called LICS Ltd. with stores in West Yorkshire, and managed to turn a £25,000 loss-making company into a £200,000 profitable business in just three years. After this Burgan was head-hunted to become the Managing Director of Coopers Chemists in 1985 where head gained experience in raising finance and dealing with merchant bankers.

In 1986 Burgan started his own chemist business; Medimart Ltd. which grew to include 38 branches across Yorkshire by the time Burgan sold the company in 1995.

Burgan funded Maria Mallaband Nursing Homes Ltd. in 1996 and the company has been growing organically and by acquisitions ever since to become one of the biggest care home providers in the UK.

== Other ==
In November 2009, Burgan was banned from driving for two years for causing the death, by careless driving, of a 44-year-old mother when he lost control of his Audi R8.

== Racing ==
Phil Burgan raced in the UK Ferrari Championship in 1996 before going on to compete in the European Ferrari Challenge from 1997 to 1999.

He then competed in the Trofeo Maserati Championship in 2006 before retiring from racing and setting up the Phil Burgan Race Academy to support new generations of British racers including James Toseland, who was supported in his second World Superbike Championship year in 2007, and talented youngster Danny Kent. Burgan's care home company is the title sponsor of the Tech 3 Moto2 team.

In 2013 Burgan came out of retirement to compete in the Peking to Paris Motor Challenge endurance rally event, with the hope of raising £100,000 for the Prince's Trust.

== Charitable activity ==
Phil drove the Peking to Paris Motor Challenge to raise money for the Prince's Trust.

Burgan's company Maria Mallaband Care Group are supporters of the Make a Dream charity for terminally ill children.

MedicX Healthfund have helped Burgan's MMGC to fund new £7m care home.
