= MMCG =

British elderly care provider

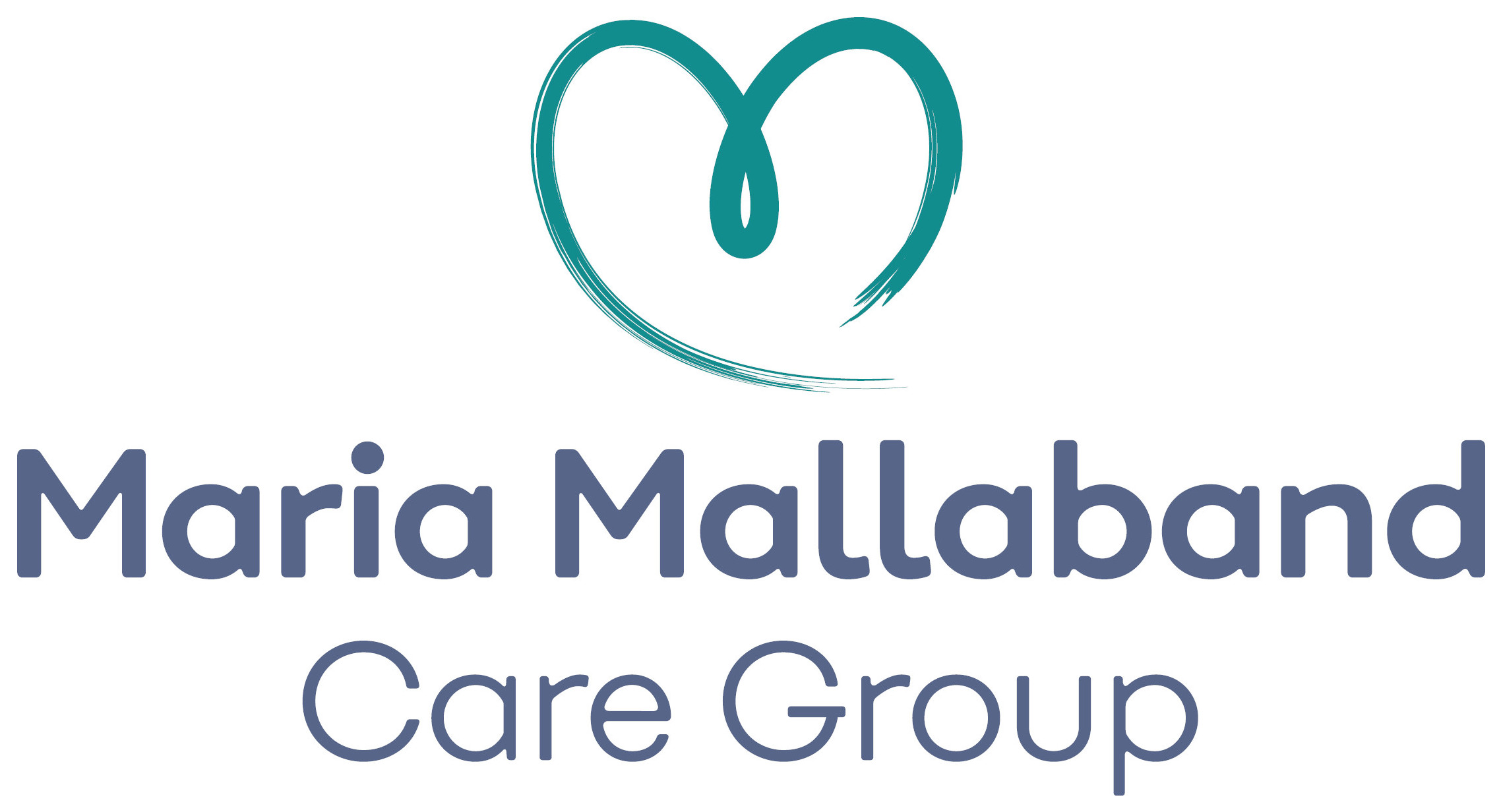
- Industry: Care for elderly and mentally impaired people
- Founded: 1996 in Leeds
- Founder: Phil Burgan
- Headquarters: England
- Website: mmcgcarehomes.co.uk

The Maria Mallaband Care Group (MMCG) is an English company providing care for elderly and mentally impaired people. It was established in Leeds in 1996 by Phil Burgan, a former pharmacist, who remains CEO; it was named after his grandmother. Its services include nursing, day care, respite and palliative care.

The group has 27 care homes located in the United Kingdom and the Channel Islands. The company was ranked 89th in the Sunday Times Fast Track 100 in 2009. and was listed as one of Britain's fastest growing private companies in 2010.

The overall enterprise also includes Countrywide Care Homes, Maria Mallaband Care Solutions, and MMCG Living. Overall, there are 76 care homes, 3,200 residents, more than 4,000 staff, and an annual turnover of £100 million.

Historically, MMCG provided care for adults with autism or challenging behaviour. In August 2014, that business was demerged into Autism UK Holdings.

In 2012, a resident in a MMCG home was kept in a cold room, and was found to have a body core temperature of 25 °C (77 °F) when they died of hypothermia. In 2016, MMCG pleaded guilty to breaking heath and safety rules, and was fined £1.6 million.

== See also ==
- Private healthcare in the United Kingdom
